= Individual dressage at the 2023 European Dressage Championships =

2023 European Dressage Championships

The individual dressage at the 2023 FEI European Dressage Championships in Riesenbeck, Germany was held at Riesenbeck International from 4 to 10 September.

Germany's Jessica von Bredow-Werndl won the gold medal in the Grand Prix Special, repeating her success after the 2021 European Championships. Nanna Skodborg Merrald representing Denmark won a silver medal in the Grand Prix Special. Charlotte Dujardin of Great Britain won a bronze in special.

== Competition format ==
The team and individual dressage competitions used the same results. Dressage had three phases. The first phase was the Grand Prix. Top 30 individuals advanced to the second phase, the Grand Prix Special where the first individual medals were awarded. The last set of medals at the 2023 European Dressage Championships was awarded after the third phase, the Grand Prix Freestyle where top 18 combinations competed. Only three riders per country are allowed to compete in the final Freestyle. If a country has four riders qualified for the Freestyle, only the best three are able to ride the Freestyle, and the remaining place(s) moves to the next combination(s) in line.

== Schedule ==
All times are Central European Summer Time (UTC+2)

Date	Time	Round
Wednesday, 6 September 2023	09:30	Grand Prix (Day 1)
Thursday, 7 September 2023	09:30	Grand Prix (Day 2)
Friday, 8 September 2023	17:00	Grand Prix Special
Sunday, 10 September 2023	13:30	Grand Prix Freestyle

== Results ==
Rider	Nation	Horse	GP score	Rank	GPS score	Rank	GPF score	Rank
Jessica von Bredow-Werndl	Germany	Dalera BB TSF	84.612	1 Q	85.593	(gold) Q	92.818	1st place, gold medalist(s)
Charlotte Dujardin	Great Britain	Imhotep	82.422	2 Q	82.583	(bronze) Q	91.396	3rd place, bronze medalist(s)
Charlotte Fry	Great Britain	Glamourdale	81.258	3 Q	81.763	4 Q	92.379	2nd place, silver medalist(s)
Nanna Skodborg Merrald	Denmark	Zepter	78.556	4 Q	82.796	(silver) Q	89.546	4
Carl Hester	Great Britain	Fame	78.540	5 Q	80.106	5 Q	85.461	7
Frederic Wandres	Germany	Bluetooth OLD	77.888	6 Q	77.052	7 Q	84.568	9
Isabell Werth	Germany	DSP Quantaz	77.174	7 Q	78.252	6 Q	88.407	5
Carina Cassøe Krüth	Denmark	Heiline's Dancera	75.761	8 Q	75.547	10 Q	84.664	8
Therese Nilshagen	Sweden	Dante Weltino OLD	75.621	9 Q	76.140	8 Q	86.132	6
Patrik Kittel	Sweden	Touchdown	75.171	10 Q	74.727	13 Q	81.118	11
Matthias Alexander Rath	Germany	Thiago GS	74.845	11 Q	72.994	19		
Gareth Hughes	Great Britain	Classic Briolinca	74.565	12 Q	74.651	14		
Emmelie Scholtens	Netherlands	Indian Rock	74.457	13 Q	75.957	9 Q	80.936	12
Andreas Helgstrand	Denmark	Jovian	74.410	14 Q	74.757	12		
Daniel Bachmann Andersen	Denmark	Vayron	74.146	15 Q	75.213	11 Q	77.279	17
Isabel Freese	Norway	Total Hope OLD	74.084	16 Q	74.240	15 Q	82.593	10
Victoria Max-Theurer	Austria	Abbeglen FRH	73.230	17 Q	72.158	23		
Larissa Pauluis	Belgium	Flambeau	73.106	18 Q	72.766	20 Q	78.000	16
Morgan Barbançon	France	Habana Libre A	72.997	19 Q	74.210	16 Q	79.521	14
Thamar Zweistra	Netherlands	Ich Weiss	72.562	20 Q	72.432	22		
Nicolas Wagner Ehlinger	Luxembourg	Quarter Back Junior FRH	72.438	21 Q	70.441	27		
João Pedro Moreira	Portugal	Zonik Hit	72.221	22 Q	72.553	21 Q	73.986	18
Pauline Basquin	France	Sertorius de Rima Z Ifce	72.189	23 Q	73.328	18 Q	79.561	13
Florian Bacher	Austria	Fidertraum	71.724	24 Q	71.520	24		
Alexandre Ayache	France	Jolene	71.584	25 Q	70.866	26		
Alejandro Sánchez del Barco	Spain	Quincallo de Indalo	71.584	25 Q	71.109	25		
Marlies van Baalen	Netherlands	Habibi DVB	71.584	25 Q	73.511	17 Q	78.882	15
Arnaud Serre	France	James Bond de Massa	71.444	28 Q	69.605	28		
Fie Christine Skarsoe	Luxembourg	Imperador Dos Cedros	71.273	29 Q	69.590	29		
Devenda Dijkstra	Netherlands	Hero	71.211	30 Q	67.584	30		
Jose Daniel Martin Dockx	Spain	Malagueno LXXXIII	71.196	31				
Stefan Lehfellner	Austria	Roberto Carlos MT	71.165	32				
Charlotte Defalque	Belgium	Botticelli	71.072	33				
Emma Kanerva	Finland	Greek Air	71.040	34				
Severo Jurado Lopez	Spain	Fuerstenglory	70.947	35				
Malin Wahlkamp-Nilsson	Sweden	Bergsjoholms Valbonne	70.730	36				
Flore de Winne	Belgium	Flynn FRH	70.404	37				
Juan Antonio Jimenez Cobo	Spain	Euclides Mor	70.342	38				
Christian Schumach	Austria	Te Quiero SF	70.217	39				
Charlotte Lenherr	Switzerland	Sir Stanley W	70.202	40				
Beata Stremler	Poland	Fairplay	69.643	41				
Maria Pais Do Amaral	Portugal	Hot Hit OLD Campline	69.596	42				
Domien Michiels	Belgium	Intermezzo van het Meerdaalhof	69.068	43				
Charlotta Rogerson	Switzerland	Famora	68.898	44				
Máté Garai	Hungary	Vincent Maranello	68.633	45				
Justina Vanagaite	Lithuania	Nabab	68.634	45				
Maria Caetano	Portugal	Fenix de Tineo	68.432	47				
Estelle Wettstein	Switzerland	Quarterboy	68.059	48				
Anna Merveldt	Ireland	Esporim	67.997	49				
Ville Vaurio	Finland	G-Star	67.981	50				
Anikó Komjáthy-Losonczy	Hungary	Dior S	67.422	51				
Mathilde Merethe Klaesson	Norway	Sandbaeks Rio EL	67.376	52				
Anna Tallberg	Finland	Grevens Zorro	67.220	53				
Grete Ayache	Estonia	Farao Da Raia	67.158	54				
Carrie Schopf	Armenia	Saumur	67.003	55				
Yvonne Österholm	Finland	Ironman H	66.972	56				
Nikolett Szalai	Hungary	Willy The Hit	65.994	57				
Trude Hestengen	Norway	Christianslund Furstino	65.994	57				
Jeannette Jenny	Portugal	Damasco	65.978	59				
Johanna Due Boje	Sweden	Mazy Klovenhoj	65.978	60				
Mathis Goerens	Luxembourg	Raptide NRW	64.689	61				
Michael Bugan	Slovakia	For President AWO	64.646	62				
Abigail Lyle	Ireland	Farrell	64.037	63				
Judy Reynolds	Ireland	Rockman Royal NG	63.401	64				
Delia Eggenberger	Switzerland	Fairtrade	62.888	65				
Gabriele Kiefer	Cyprus	Ophelia	60.000	66				
Benedek Pachl	Hungary	Donna Frederika	EL	-				
Sorrell Klatzko	Ireland	Turbo	WD	-				
Marta Sobierajska	Poland	Ultrablue de Massa	WD	-				

=== Team ranking ===
Country	Total	Rank
Great Britain	242.220	1st place, gold medalist(s)
Germany	239.674	2nd place, silver medalist(s)
Denmark	228.727	3rd place, bronze medalist(s)
Sweden	221.522	4
Netherlands	218.603	5
France	216.770	6
Austria	216.119	7
Belgium	214.582	8
Spain	213.727	9
Portugal	210.249	10
Luxembourg	208.400	11
Norway	207.454	12
Switzerland	207.159	13
Finland	206.241	14
Hungary	202.049	15
Ireland	195.435	16
