= Individual dressage at the 2021 European Dressage Championships =

The individual dressage at the 2021 European Dressage Championships in Hagen, germany was held at Hof Kasselmann from 7 to 12 September.

Germany's Jessica von Bredow-Werndl won the gold medal in both Grand Prix Special and Grand Prix Freestyle, repeating her success after the Olympic Games. Title defender Isabell Werth representing Germany won a silver medal in the Grand Prix Special. Cathrine Dufour of Denmark won a bronze in special.

== Competition format ==
The team and individual dressage competitions used the same results. Dressage had three phases. The first phase was the Grand Prix. Top 30 individuals advanced to the second phase, the Grand Prix Special where the first individual medals were awarded. The last set of medals at the 2021 European Dressage Championships was awarded after the third phase, the Grand Prix Freestyle where top 15 combinations competed.

== Schedule ==
All times are Central European Summer Time (UTC+2)

Date	Time	Round
Tuesday, 7 September 2021	08:30	Grand Prix (Day 1)
Wednesday, 8 September 2021	08:30	Grand Prix (Day 2)
Thursday, 9 September 2021	17:00	Grand Prix Special
Saturday, 11 September 2021	13:15	Grand Prix Freestyle

== Results ==
Rider	Nation	Horse	GP score	Rank	GPS score	Rank	GPF score	Rank
Jessica von Bredow-Werndl	Germany	Dalera BB TSF	84.099	1 Q	84.271	(gold) Q	91.021	1st place, gold medalist(s)
Isabell Werth	Germany	Weihegold OLD	79.860	2 Q	81.702	(silver) Q	84.896	4
Charlotte Dujardin	Great Britain	Gio	79.829	3 Q	79.787	4 Q	87.246	3rd place, bronze medalist(s)
Cathrine Dufour	Denmark	Bohemian	79.721	4 Q	81.079	(bronze) Q	88.436	2nd place, silver medalist(s)
Charlotte Fry	Great Britain	Everdale	77.671	5 Q	78.146	5 Q	84.721	5
Henri Ruoste	Finland	Hawtins Delicato	77.314	6 Q	74.894	13 Q	82.600	6
Therese Nilshagen	Sweden	Dante Weltino OLD	76.941	7 Q	76.869	8 Q	81.325	8
Daniel Bachmann Andersen	Denmark	Marshall-Bell	76.366	8 Q	75.638	10 Q	82.050	7
Juliette Ramel	Sweden	Buriel K.H.	76.196	9 Q	76.900	7 Q	80.175	9
Nanna Skodborg Merrald	Denmark	Orthilia	75.078	10 Q	74.909	12 Q	78.904	12
Dorothee Schneider	Germany	Faustus	74.985	11 Q	74.802	14		
Carl Hester	Great Britain	En Vogue	74.845	12 Q	77.310	6 Q	78.375	13
Hans-Peter Minderhoud	Netherlands	Dream Boy	74.503	13 Q	73.632	16		
Gareth Hughes	Great Britain	Sintano van Hof Olympia	74.394	14 Q	73.723	15		
Dinja van Liere	Netherlands	Haute Couture	74.208	15 Q	75.699	9 Q	79.668	10
Helen Langehanenberg	Germany	Annabelle	73.960	16 Q	75.228	11 Q	77.214	14
Beatriz Ferrer-Salat	Spain	Elegance	73.898	17 Q	71.748	20		
Victoria Max-Theurer	Austria	Abbeglen FRH	73.106	18 Q	71.672	22		
Nicolas Wagner	Luxembourg	Quater Back Junior	73.090	19 Q	70.243	25		
José Antonio Garcia Mena	Spain	Divina Royal	72.671	20 Q	72.842	17 Q	79.361	11
Marlies van Baalen	Netherlands	Go Legend	72.531	21 Q	69.377	26		
Florian Bacher	Austria	Fidertraum OLD	72.516	22 Q	71.687	21		
Adelinde Cornelissen	Netherlands	Governor-STR	72.484	23 Q	72.143	18 Q	ELI	15
Jeanna Hogberg	Sweden	Lorenzo	72.252	24 Q	71.976	19		
Morgan Barbançon	France	Sir Donnerhall II	71.941	25 Q	71.109	23		
Emma Kanerva	Finland	Greek Air	71.304	26 Q	65.319	30		
Estelle Wettstein	Switzerland	Quaterboy	71.087	27 Q	69.027	27		
Charlotte Heering	Denmark	Bufranco	70.699	28 Q	71.018	24		
Anikó Losonczy	Hungary	Dior S	70.046	29 Q	68.343	28		
Mikaela Soratie	Finland	Hot Casanova	70.016	30 Q	66.854	29		
Inessa Merkulova	Russia	Mister X	69.969	31				
Carla Aeberhard	Switzerland	Delioh von Buchmatt CH	69.581	32				
Martim Meneres	Portugal	Equador	69.581	33				
Carlos Pinto	Portugal	La Gesse Sultao Menezes	69.518	34				
Filipe Canelas	Portugal	Fortuna	69.425	35				
Juan Antonio Jimenez Cobo	Spain	Euclides Mor	69.410	36				
Christian Schumach	Austria	Te Quiro SF	69.099	37				
Stella Hagelstam	Finland	Sangraal	69.006	38				
Severo Jurado Lopez	Spain	Fendi T	68.944	39				
Marie Emilie Bretenoux	France	Quartz of Jazz	68.665	40				
Duarte Nogueira	Portugal	Beirao	68.634	41				
Csaba Szokola	Hungary	Enying	68.587	42				
Larissa Pauluis	Belgium	First-Step Valentin	68.509	43				
Jacob Noerby Soerensen	Sweden	Moegelbjergs Romeo	68.431	44				
Alexandre Ayache	France	Zo What	68.354	45				
Anna Merveldt	Ireland	Esporim	68.338	46				
Thibault Vandenberghe	Belgium	Santiago Song	68.168	47				
Maria Shuvalova	Russia	Ilyumzhinov Famous Cross	67.982	48				
Astrid Neumayer	Austria	Zap Zap	67.841	49				
Michael Bugan	Slovakia	For President	67.811	50				
Elena Fernandez	Switzerland	Sueno II	67.671	51				
Jonas Elvebakk	Norway	Citta	67.531	52				
Birgit Wientzek Pläge	Switzerland	Hot Secret	67.205	53				
Marina Aframeeva	Russia	Upgrade	67.127	54				
Katarzyna Milczarek	Poland	Guapo	66.925	55				
Ellen Birgitte Farbrot	Norway	Tailormade Red Rebel	66.724	56				
Alisa Glinka	Moldova	Aachen	66.258	57				
Justina Vanagaite	Lithuania	Nabab	66.227	58				
Maxime Collard	France	Cupido PB	65.326	59				
Zaneta Skowronska	Poland	Romantic P	65.264	60				
Aleksandra Maksakova	Russia	Bojengels	65.202	61				
Alexa Fairchild	Belgium	Dabanos d'O4	65.047	62				
Carolyn Mellor	Ireland	Gouverneur M	64.395	63				
Domien Michiels	Belgium	Intermezzo van het Meerdaalhof	64.115	64				
Valentina Truppa	Italy	Ranieri	62.360	65				
Nikolett Szalay	Hungary	Willy De Hit	62.298	66				
Roberto Brenna	Italy	Diamant	61.522	67				
Sergey Puzko	Ukraine	Ser Diamant	59.984	68				
Tatiana Miloserdova	Italy	Florento Fortuna	59.938	69				
Nausica Maroni	Italy	Embajador SG	WD	-				
Anna Dyachenko	Ukraine	Poseydon	WD	-				

=== Team ranking ===
Country	Total	Rank
Germany	238.944	1st place, gold medalist(s)
Great Britain	232.345	2nd place, silver medalist(s)
Denmark	231.165	3rd place, bronze medalist(s)
Sweden	225.389	4
Netherlands	221.242	5
Finland	218.634	6
Spain	215.979	7
Austria	214.721	8
France	208.960	9
Portugal	208.524	10
Switzerland	208.339	11
Russia	205.078	12
Belgium	201.724	13
Hungary	200.931	14
Italy	183.820	15
