= 2012 FEI Nations Cup Promotional League =

The 2012 FEI Nations Cup Promotional League is the 2012 edition of the secondary international team Grand Prix show jumping competition run by the FEI.

== European Promotional League ==
=== Standings ===
A team of a country that belongs to one of the 2012 FEI Nations Cup teams can not earn points in this league. Teams who are part of one of the other Promotional Leagues also can not earn points in this league.

The second-placed to fourth-placed teams of the European Promotional League have the permission to start in the 2012 Promotional League Final.

	Team	Points					Total
	Team	BEL (Belgium)	AUT (Austria)	DEN (Denmark)	NOR (Norway)	ESP (Spain)	Total
1	Ukraine	—	10	7	10	7	34
2	Denmark	6	3	10	5.5	6	30.5
3	Italy	10	2	3.5	4	10	29.5
4	Spain	7	4	3.5	7	5	26.5
5	Qatar	0	5.5	6	3	—	14.5
6	Brazil	—	7	5	—	—	12
7	Norway	—	—	2	5.5	—	7.5
8	Australia	5	1	0	—	—	6
9	Saudi Arabia	—	5.5	—	—	—	5.5
10	Finland	—	—	1	2	—	3
11	Austria	—	0	0	—	—	0
12	Japan	—	—	0	—	—	0
		BEL (Belgium)	AUT (Austria)	DEN (Denmark)	NOR (Norway)	ESP (Spain)	

=== Results ===
==== FEI Nations Cup of Belgium ====
CSIO 4* – May 2, 2012 to May 6, 2012 – Lummen (Vlaams Feest van de Paardensport), Belgium
Competition: Friday, May 4, 2012 – Start: 2:00 pm, prize money: 40 000 €

	Team	Rider	Horse	Round A	Round B	Total penalties	Jump-off		Prize €	scoring points
	Team	Rider	Horse	Penalties	Penalties	Total penalties	Penalties	Time (s)	Prize €	scoring points
1	Italy	Juan Carlos Garcia	Bonzai van de Warande	8	0					
1	Italy	Francesca Capponi	Stallone	0	0					
1	Italy	Luca Marziani	Wivina	0	5					
1	Italy	Natale Chiaudani	Almero	8	0					
1	Italy			8	0	8			10,000 €	10
2	Belgium	Nicola Philippaerts	Carlos V.H.P.Z.	4	0					
2	Belgium	Donaal Brondeel	Adorado	0	8					
2	Belgium	Olivier Philippaerts	Cabrio van de Heffinck	0	4					
2	Belgium	Niels Bruynseels	Castelino van de Helle	8	4					
2	Belgium			4	8	12			7,000 €	-
2	Canada	Yann Candele	Carlotta Singular	0	8					
2	Canada	Tiffany Foster	Victor	12	4					
2	Canada	Jill Henselwood	George	4	4					
2	Canada	Ian Millar	Star Power	0	0					
2	Canada			4	8	12			7,000 €	-
4	Germany	Hans-Dieter Dreher	Magnus Romeo	4	4					
4	Germany	Thomas Voß	Carinjo	0	4					
4	Germany	Lars Nieberg	Balounito	15	22					
4	Germany	Rene Tebbel	Light On	4	0					
4	Germany			8	8	16			3,334 €	-
4	Mexico	Alberto Michan Halbinger	Rosalia	0	0					
4	Mexico	Federico Fernández	Victoria	4	4					
4	Mexico	Jaime Azcarraga	Gangster	4	4					
4	Mexico	Jaime Guerra Piedra	Omega Star	12	12					
4	Mexico			8	8	16			3,334 €	-
4	Spain	Pilar Lucrecia Cordon	Panama Tame	4	0					
4	Spain	Paola Amilibia	Prunella d'Ariel	4	4					
4	Spain	Carlos Catalan	Carlos	13	5					
4	Spain	Manuel Añon	Rackel Chavannaise	0	4					
4	Spain			8	8	16			3,334 €	7

(Top 6 of 14 Teams)
Grey penalties points do not count for the team result, in the second round only three riders per team are allowed to start.

==== FEI Nations Cup of Austria ====
CSIO 4* – May 10, 2012 to May 13, 2012 – Linz (Linzer Pferdefestival), Austria
Competition: Friday, May 11, 2012; prize money: 30 000 €

	Team	Rider	Horse	Round A	Round B	Total penalties	Jump-off		Prize €	scoring points
	Team	Rider	Horse	Penalties	Penalties	Total penalties	Penalties	Time (s)	Prize €	scoring points
1	Ukraine	Cassio Rivetti	Verdi	0	0					
1	Ukraine	Oleksandr Onyshchenko	Comte d'Arsouilles	5	17					
1	Ukraine	Björn Nagel	Niack de l'Abbaye	0	0					
1	Ukraine	Katharina Offel	Vivant	8	1					
1	Ukraine			5	1	6			9,000 €	10
2	Brazil	Luiz Francisco de Azevedo	Special	8	0					
2	Brazil	Carlos Eduardo Motta Ribas	Show Show	12	12					
2	Brazil	José Roberto Reynoso Fernandez	Maestro St Lois	4	0					
2	Brazil	Pedro Veniss	Cornet d'Amour	0	0					
2	Brazil			12	0	12			6,000 €	7
3	Canada	Yann Candele	Carlotta Singular	4	16					
3	Canada	Tiffany Foster	Victor	4	0					
3	Canada	Jill Henselwood	George	4	0					
3	Canada	Ian Millar	Star Power	8	4					
3	Canada			12	4	16			4,000 €	-
4	Mexico	Enrique Gonzalez	Criptonite	9	4					
4	Mexico	Federico Fernández	Victoria	1	12					
4	Mexico	Nicolas Pizarro	Crossing Jordan	12	0					
4	Mexico	Alberto Michan	Rosalia	0	4					
4	Mexico			10	8	18			3,000 €	-
5	Qatar	Ali Bin Khalid Al Thani	Adolfo FRH	8	0					
5	Qatar	Abdul Rahman Al Marri	Maradonna	17	18					
5	Qatar	Mubarak Yousuf Al Rumaihi	Casanova	4	8					
5	Qatar	Bassem Hassan Mohammed	Kellemoi de Pepita	4	0					
5	Qatar			16	8	24			2,000 €	5.5
5	Saudi Arabia	Kamal Abdullah Bahamdan	Delphi	0	0					
5	Saudi Arabia	Prince Abdullah Al Saud	Davos	9	4					
5	Saudi Arabia	Prince Faisal Al Shalan	Talan	6	5					
5	Saudi Arabia	Ramzy Hamad Al Duhami	Al Capone	9	retired					
5	Saudi Arabia			15	9	24			2,000 €	5.5
5	Germany	Jörg Naeve	Calado	8	8					
5	Germany	David Will	Don CeSar	8	4					
5	Germany	Jan Wernke	Queen Mary	4	0					
5	Germany	Max Kühner	Clintop	0	8					
5	Germany			12	12	24			2,000 €	-

(Top 7 of 15 Teams)
Grey penalties points do not count for the team result, in the second round only three riders per team are allowed to start.

==== FEI Nations Cup of Denmark ====
CSIO 4* – May 17, 2012 to May 20, 2012 – Copenhagen, Denmark
Competition: Friday, May 18, 2012; prize money: 225 000 DKK

	Team	Rider	Horse	Round A	Round B	Total penalties	Jump-off		Prize DKK	scoring points
	Team	Rider	Horse	Penalties	Penalties	Total penalties	Penalties	Time (s)	Prize DKK	scoring points
1	Germany	Tim Rieskamp-Goedeking	Chopin	0	8					
1	Germany	Patrick Stühlmeyer	Lacan		0					
1	Germany	Florian Meyer zu Hartum	Heidegirl Wichenstein CH	0	0					
1	Germany	Rolf Moormann	Acorte	0	0					
1	Germany			0	0	0			60,000 DKK	-
2	Denmark	Andreas Schou	Uno's Safier	0	0					
2	Denmark	Rikke Haastrup	Luganer	4	0					
2	Denmark	Thomas Sandgaard	Amarone	13	0					
2	Denmark	Linnea Ericsson	Damgaardens Extens	0	did not start					
2	Denmark			4	0	4			40,000 DKK	10
3	Ukraine	Cassio Rivetti	Lord if de Chalusse	4	0					
3	Ukraine	Oleg Krasyuk	Caligula	4	8					
3	Ukraine	Oleksandr Onyshchenko	Comte d'Arsouilles	16	8					
3	Ukraine	Björn Nagel	Quickdiamond	0	4					
3	Ukraine			8	12	20			35,000 DKK	7
4	Ireland	Edward Doyle	Samgemjee	8	4					
4	Ireland	Andrew Bourns	Roundthorn Madios	4	4					
4	Ireland	Clement McMahon	Pacino	4	4					
4	Ireland	Trevor Coyle	Jubilee d'Ouilly	4	4					
4	Ireland			12	12	24			25,000 DKK	-
5	Qatar	Ali Bin Khalid Al Thani	Whitaker	8	13					
5	Qatar	Abdul Rahman Al Marri	Sidoline van de Centaur	12	8					
5	Qatar	Mubarak Yousuf Al Rumaihi	Casanova	0	8					
5	Qatar	Bassem Hassan Mohammed	Arizona Pie	4	0					
5	Qatar			12	16	28			16,500 DKK	6
5	Sweden	Niklas Arvidsson	Click and Cash	4	20					
5	Sweden	Douglas Lindelöw	Talina	16	8					
5	Sweden	Frida Berggren	Abeltje Z	4	0					
5	Sweden	Daniel Zetterman	Glory Days	8	4					
5	Sweden			16	12	28			16,500 DKK	-
6	Brazil	José Roberto Reynoso Fernandez	Maestro St Lois	0	0					
6	Brazil	Carlos Ribas	Show Show	6	16					
6	Brazil	Paulo Santana	Taloubet	8	eliminated					
6	Brazil	Rodrigo Pessoa	Winsom	12	0					
6	Brazil			14	16	30			12,000 DKK	5

(Top 7 of 18 Teams)
Grey penalties points do not count for the team result, in the second round only three riders per team are allowed to start.

==== FEI Nations Cup of Norway ====
CSIO 3* – June 21, 2011 to June 24, 2012 – Drammen, Norway
Competition: Saturday, June 23, 2012

	Team	Rider	Horse	Round A	Round B	Total penalties	Jump-off		scoring points
	Team	Rider	Horse	Penalties	Penalties	Total penalties	Penalties	Time (s)	scoring points
1	Ukraine	Björn Nagel	Niak de L`Abbaye	0	4				
1	Ukraine	Katharina Offel	Vivant	0	0				
1	Ukraine	Cassio Rivetti	Temple Road	0	0				
1	Ukraine	Oleksandr Onyshchenko	Comte d'Arsouilles	8	4				
1	Ukraine			0	4	4			10
2	Spain	Paola Amilibia Puig	Prunella D`Ariel	0	0				
2	Spain	Manuel Añón Suárez	Rackel Chavannaise	4	1				
2	Spain	Pilar Lucrecia Cordón Muro	Nuage Bleu	0	0				
2	Spain	Rutherford Latham	Nectar du Plessis	12	5				
2	Spain			4	1	5			7
2	Netherlands	Henk van de Pol	Warrant	0	0				
2	Netherlands	Suzanne Tepper	Wish	0	0				
2	Netherlands	Roelof Bril	Warwick	0	5				
2	Netherlands	Joep Raijmakers	Winston	0	eliminated				
2	Netherlands			0	5	5			-
4	Norway	Line Karlsen Raaholt	Duchesse de la Pomme	8	eliminated				
4	Norway	Stein Endresen	Cabachon	0	0				
4	Norway	Geir Gulliksen	L'Espoir	0	5				
4	Norway	Victoria Gulliksen	Urval	4	1				
4	Norway			4	6	10			5.5
4	Denmark	Søren Pedersen	Esperanza de Rebel	1	1				
4	Denmark	Linnea Ericsson	Extens	0	4				
4	Denmark	Thomas Velin	Chopin van het Moleneind	5	5				
4	Denmark	Rikke Haastrup	Luganer	0	4				
4	Denmark			1	9	10			5.5
6	Ireland	Capt. Shane Carey	Ballymore Eustace	0	0				
6	Ireland	Capt. Michael Kelly	Ringwood Abbey	12	12				
6	Ireland	Thomas Ryan	Cruise On Clover	4	4				
6	Ireland	Joan Greene	Biscaya D`Eversem	0	8				
6	Ireland			4	12	16			-

(Top 6 of 10 Teams)
Grey penalties points do not count for the team result, in the second round only three riders per team are allowed to start.

==== FEI Nations Cup of Spain ====
CSIO 5* Gijón – August 29, 2012 to September 3, 2012 – Gijón, Spain

	Team	Rider	Horse	Round A	Round B	Total penalties	Jump-off		Prize €	scoring points
	Team	Rider	Horse	Penalties	Penalties	Total penalties	Penalties	Time (s)	Prize €	scoring points
1	France	Penelope Leprevost	Mylord Carthago *HN	0	4					
1	France	Kevin Staut	Reveur de Hurtebise *HDC	4	0					
1	France	Marie Hecart	Myself de Breve	1	4					
1	France	Aymeric de Ponnat	Armitages Boy	5	NP					
1	France			5	8	13			20,000 €	-
2	Italy	Lucia Vizzini	Loro Piana Quinta Roo	17	4					
2	Italy	Roberto Arioldi	Loro Piana Lagerfeld 19	1	13					
2	Italy	Luca Marciani	Wivina	1	9					
2	Italy	Natale Chiaudani	Fixdesign Almero 12	0	4					
2	Italy			2	17	19			14,000 €	10
3	United Kingdom	Daniel Neilson	Varo M	0	4					
3	United Kingdom	Joe Clayton	Mr. Darcy	18	4					
3	United Kingdom	Laura Renwick	Roller Coaster	8	8					
3	United Kingdom	John Whitaker	Maximillian IV	5	10					
3	United Kingdom			13	16	29			10,000 €	-
4	Ukraine	Cassio Rivetti	Temple Road	0	4					
4	Ukraine	Ferenc Szentirmai	Nifrane de Kreisker	8	16					
4	Ukraine	Bjorn Nagel	Niak de l'Abbaye	8	13					
4	Ukraine	Katharina Offel	Vivant	4	4					
4	Ukraine			12	21	33			8,000 €	7
5	Denmark	Soren Pedersen	Tailormade Esperanza de Rebel	4	9					
5	Denmark	Emilie Martinsen	Caballero 80	8	4					
5	Denmark	Charlotte von Rönne	Cartani 4	9	1					
5	Denmark	Thomas Sandgaard	Amarone	9	13					
5	Denmark			21	14	35			6,000 €	6
6	Spain	Pilar Lucrecia Cordón Muro	Nuage Bleu	4	8					
6	Spain	Carlos Catalán Casanovas	Carlos	10	E					
6	Spain	Paola Amilibia Puig	Prunella d'Ariel	5	0					
6	Spain	Manuel Añón Suárez	Rackel Chavannaise	4	17					
6	Spain			13	25	38			6,000 €	5
7	Canada	Lisa Carlsen	La Boom	1	4					
7	Canada	Tiffany Foster	Southwind VDL	12	12					
7	Canada	Jonathan Asselin	Showgirl	1	999 E					
7	Canada	Eric Lamaze	Verdi	R	NP					
7	Canada			17	16	30				-
8	United States	Reed Kessler	Mika	4						
8	United States	Katherine Dinan	Nougat du Vallet	E						
8	United States	Jessica Springsteen	Vornado van den Hoendrik	8						
8	United States	Laura Kraut	Belmont	4						
8	United States			16		16				-
9	Belgium	Maurice van Roosbroeck	Calumet	4						
9	Belgium	Rik Hemeryck	Papillon Z	16						
9	Belgium	Donaat Brondeel	Breemeersen Adorado	8						
9	Belgium	Dominique Hendricks	Cor van de Wateringhoeve	8						
9	Belgium			20		20				-
10	Netherlands	Vicent Voorn	Audi's Gestion Priamus Z	8						
10	Netherlands	Aniek Poels	Baggio 11	12						
10	Netherlands	Albert Voorn	Tobalio	8						
10	Netherlands	Wout-Jan van der Schans	Eurocommerce Seoul	16						
10	Netherlands			28		28				-
11	Germany	Holger Wulschner	Cavity G	12						
11	Germany	Marc Bettinger	Quannan-R	E						
11	Germany	Rolf Moormann	Acorte	4						
11	Germany	Lars Nieberg	Casallora	17						
11	Germany			33		33				-
12	Ireland	Billy Twomey	Romanov	15						
12	Ireland	Marion Hughes	Heritage HHS Fortuna	14						
12	Ireland	Trevor Coyle	Jubilee d'Ouilly	23						
12	Ireland	Conor Swail	Lansdowne	R						
12	Ireland			52		52				-
13	Portugal	Mário Wilson Fernandes	Valvarja	13						
13	Portugal	Gonçalo Barradas	Norton du Mancel	20						
13	Portugal	António Matos Almeida	Shining Star	E						
13	Portugal	Alexandre Mascarenhas de Lemos	Chiquitita 4	29						
13	Portugal			62		62				-

Grey penalties points do not count for the team result.

== Challengers League ==
=== Standings ===
A team of a country that belongs to one of the 2012 FEI Nations Cup teams can not earn points in this league. Also teams who are part of one of the other Promotional Leagues also can not earn points in this league.

The best six results will be count for the final ranking. The first-placed to third-placed teams of the 2012 Challengers League will have the permission to start in the 2012 Promotional League Final.

	Team	Points								Total
	Team	BLR (Belarus)	POR (Portugal)	LAT (Latvia)	POL (Poland)	HUN (Hungary)	SVK (Slovakia)	LTU (Lithuania)	RUS (Russia)	Total
1	Poland	7	—	10	10	10	6	10	10	56
2	Russia	10	—	7	—	—	—	6	7	30
3	Belarus	0	—	5	—	5	—	7	6	23
4	Lithuania	6	—	4	—	—	—	4	5	19
5	Estonia	—	—	6	—	—	—	5	4	15
6	Slovakia	—	—	—	—	6	7	—	—	13
7	Hungary	—	—	—	—	7	5	—	—	12
8	Latvia	5	—	3	—	—	—	0	3	11
9	Czech Republic	—	—	—	—	—	10	—	—	10
10	Portugal	—	10	—	—	—	—	—	—	10
11	Romania	—	—	—	—	0	—	—	—	0
		BLR (Belarus)	POR (Portugal)	LAT (Latvia)	POL (Poland)	HUN (Hungary)	SVK (Slovakia)	LTU (Lithuania)	RUS (Russia)	

=== Results ===
==== FEI Nations Cup of Belarus ====
CSIO 2* – May 24, 2012 to May 27, 2012 – Minsk, Belarus

	Team	Rider	Horse	Round A	Round B	Total penalties	Jump-off		Prize money €	scoring points
	Team	Rider	Horse	Penalties	Penalties	Total penalties	Penalties	Time (s)	Prize money €	scoring points
1	Russia	Olga Chechina	Aleqs	12	8					
1	Russia	Anna Gromzina	Pimlico	16	4					
1	Russia	Vadim Konovalov	Lance S	20	8					
1	Russia	Vladimir Beletskiy	Unique Cheval	9	13					
1	Russia			37	20	57			8,500 €	10
2	Poland	Lukasz Wasilewski	Wavantos van de Renvillehoeve	0	8					
2	Poland	Alicja Grygier	Dark Caretino	21	13					
2	Poland	Jaroslaw Skrzyczynski	Balouzino	12	4					
2	Poland			33	25	58			6,500 €	7
3	Lithuania	Nerijus Sipaila	Lady Sieglinn	12	12					
3	Lithuania	Andrius Petrovas	Van Helsing	8	12					
3	Lithuania	Benas Gutkauskas	Carnaval	14	9					
3	Lithuania			34	33	67			4,500 €	6
4	Latvia	Dainis Ozols	Laguna	9	8					
4	Latvia	Guntars Silinsh	Lord Picasso	13	12					
4	Latvia	Aleksandrs Sakurovs	Girs	29	13					
4	Latvia	Andis Varna	Marmors	38	withdrawn					
4	Latvia			51	33	84			3,500 €	5
ELI	Belarus	Yahor Morotski	Wacantos	13						
ELI	Belarus	Maxim Kryna	Challenger	18						
ELI	Belarus	Ibragim Vaskov	Rapide Umorkus	eliminated						
ELI	Belarus	Vasil Ivanou	Aleqs	eliminated						
ELI	Belarus			eliminated						0

Grey penalties points do not count for the team result, in the second round only three riders per team are allowed to start.

==== FEI Nations Cup of Portugal ====
CSIO 4* – May 31, 2012 to June 3, 2012 – Lisbon, Portugal Competition: Friday, June 1, 2012 – Start: 6:00 pm

	Team	Rider	Horse	Round A	Round B	Total penalties	Jump-off		Prize money €	scoring points
	Team	Rider	Horse	Penalties	Penalties	Total penalties	Penalties	Time (s)	Prize money €	scoring points
1	Belgium	Dominique Joassin	Dark de la Hart	4	0					
1	Belgium	Rosella de Simone	Orson des Hayettes	4	4					
1	Belgium	Jody Bosteels	Daytona de Muze	8	0					
1	Belgium	Dominique Hendrickx	Cor van de Wateringhoeve	4	retired					
1	Belgium			12	4	16			7,000 €	-
2	Spain	Juan Antonio de Wit	Vidar	4	4					
2	Spain	Blai Cap de Vila	Ubine Jambo M	8	20					
2	Spain	Santiago Nunez Riva	Quarela de Toscane	4	8					
2	Spain	Inma Roquet Autonell	Uvettas	0	4					
2	Spain			8	16	24			5,000 €	-
2	Ireland	Peter Smyth	Hermoine IV	8	4					
2	Ireland	Marion Hughes	Fortuna	4	4					
2	Ireland	Andrew Bourns	Roundthorn Madios	4	0					
2	Ireland	Edward Doyle	Samgemjee	12	retired					
2	Ireland			16	8	24			5,000 €	-
4	Brazil	Felipe Guinato	Babouche	0	12					
4	Brazil	Felipe di Villarosa do Amaral	Dante	4	14					
4	Brazil	Marlon Zanotelli	Ode des Roches	4	4					
4	Brazil	Camilla Mazza de Benedicto	Kavanagh IV	0	8					
4	Brazil			4	4	8			3,375 €	-
5	Italy	Carola Garre	Ultra Top van het Paradijs	0	4					
5	Italy	Matteo Zamana	Mikado du Murier	9	8					
5	Italy	Ludovica Minoli	Loisir du Bocage	12	16					
5	Italy	Giuseppe d'Onofrio	Warland	9	8					
5	Italy			18	20	38			1,750 €	-
6	Portugal	Francisco Rocha	Nanuk II do Ry	12	16					
6	Portugal	Ivan Camargo	Calimero of Colors	4	16					
6	Portugal	Luis Sabino Gonçalves	Imperio Egipcio Milton	0	4					
6	Portugal	Antonio Vozone	Lacy Woman	12	12					
6	Portugal			16	32	48			1,375 €	10

(Top 6 of 10 Teams)
Grey penalties points do not count for the team result, in the second round only three riders per team are allowed to start.

==== FEI Nations Cup of Latvia ====
CSIO 3* – June 28, 2012 to July 1, 2012 – Riga, Latvia

	Team	Rider	Horse	Round A	Round B	Total penalties	Jump-off		scoring points
	Team	Rider	Horse	Penalties	Penalties	Total penalties	Penalties	Time (s)	scoring points
1	Poland	Piotr Morsztyn	Osadkowski van Halen	0	8				
1	Poland	Piotr Sawicki	Caballus Z	0	5				
1	Poland	Antoni Tomaszewski	Trojka	4	withdrawn				
1	Poland	Lukasz Wasilewski	Wavantos van de Renvillehove	4	4				
1	Poland			4	17	21			10
2	Russia	Olga Chechina	Aleqs	0	4				
2	Russia	Mikhail Safronov	Virones C	4	11				
2	Russia	Anna Gromzina	Pimlico	8	8				
2	Russia	Anatoly Timchenko	CARA	16	0				
2	Russia			12	12	24			7
3	Finland	Mikko Mäentausta	Quenaro	0	4				
3	Finland	Rosa Ruutsalo	Whisper AS	8	0				
3	Finland	Marina Ehrnrooth	Charlet Orchidee	8	16				
3	Finland	Jessica Timgren	Within Temptation	8	8				
3	Finland			16	12	28			-
4	Estonia	Tiit Kivisild	Cinnamon	4	0				
4	Estonia	Rein Pill	Konstantinos KS	4	8				
4	Estonia	Urmas Raag	Axel du Beaumont	12	12				
4	Estonia	Gunnar Klettenberg	Lance S	16	8				
4	Estonia			20	16	36			6

(Top 4 of 7 Teams)
Grey penalties points do not count for the team result, in the second round only three riders per team are allowed to start.

==== FEI Nations Cup of Poland ====
CSIO 3* – July 5, 2012 to July 8, 2012 – Sopot, Poland
Competition: Friday, July 8, 2012 at 4:30 pm

	Team	Rider	Horse	Round A	Round B	Total penalties	Jump-off		Prize money PLN	scoring points
	Team	Rider	Horse	Penalties	Penalties	Total penalties	Penalties	Time (s)	Prize money PLN	scoring points
1	Germany	Thomas Kleis	Questa Vittoria	9	0					
1	Germany	Kathrin Müller	Shakespeare	0	4					
1	Germany	Gerrit Schepers	Caroll	4	0					
1	Germany	Felix Haßmann	Balzaci	0	0					
1	Germany			4	0	4			35,000 PLN	-
2	Italy	Roberto Turchetto	Baretto	0	4					
2	Italy	Eleonora Zorzetto	Villeneuve D.	16	5					
2	Italy	Lucia Vizzini	Lismeen Lancer	0	0					
2	Italy	Giulia Martinengo Marquet	Athletica	0	did not start					
2	Italy			0	9	9			25,000 PLN	-
3	Switzerland	Martin Fuchs	Karin II CH	0	8					
3	Switzerland	Nadine Traber	Ramses de Virton	4	4					
3	Switzerland	Martina Meroni	Rivella Sitte	16	6					
3	Switzerland	Nadja Steiner	Como II	5	1					
3	Switzerland			9	11	20			15,000 PLN	-
4	Belgium	Ann Carton	Dakota	8	0					
4	Belgium	Candice Lauwers	Cibolin Prieure Z	5	5					
4	Belgium	Rosella de Simone	Orson des Hayettes	1	8					
4	Belgium	Lieven Devos	Wimbledon	4	17					
4	Belgium			10	13	23			9,000 PLN	-
4	Denmark	Karina Rie Truelsen	Quite Quick	9	8					
4	Denmark	Charlotte Lund	Cartani	1	1					
4	Denmark	Kim Henriksen	Montana	10	4					
4	Denmark	Søren Pedersen	Esperanza de Rebel	4	4					
4	Denmark			14	9	23			9,000 PLN	-
4	Poland	Piotr Sawicki	Caballus Z	14	9					
4	Poland	Piotr Morsztyn	Osadkowski van Halen	5	5					
4	Poland	Łukasz Wasilewski	Wavantos van de Renvillehoeve	9	9					
4	Poland	Jan Chrzanowski	Newton du Haut Bois	1	retired					
4	Poland			15	23	38			7,000 PLN	10

(Top 6 of 8 Teams)
Grey penalties points do not count for the team result.

==== FEI Nations Cup of Hungary ====
CSIO 3*-W – July 12, 2012 to July 15, 2012 – Budapest, Hungary
Competition: Friday, July 13, 2012, prize money: 26 000 €

	Team	Rider	Horse	Round A	Round B	Total penalties	Jump-off		Prize money €	scoring points
	Team	Rider	Horse	Penalties	Penalties	Total penalties	Penalties	Time (s)	Prize money €	scoring points
1	Germany	Andreas Brenner	Showman	1	4					
1	Germany	Henrik Griese	Caprys	4	8					
1	Germany	Thorsten Wittenberg	Connaught	1	0					
1	Germany	Jan Wernke	Queen Mary	8	0					
1	Germany			6	8	10			8,600 €	-
2	Denmark	Karina Rie Truelsen	Quite Quick	4	4					
2	Denmark	Kim Henriksen	Kamila	9	0					
2	Denmark	Rikke Haastrup	Luganer	5	0					
2	Denmark	Torben Frandsen	Antares	1	eliminated					
2	Denmark			10	4	14			6,000 €	-
3	Austria	Dieter Köfler	Prince de Vaux	4	21					
3	Austria	Anton Martin Bauer	Nausica Tame	12	0					
3	Austria	Gerfried Puck	Usrava	8	4					
3	Austria	Thomas Frühmann	The Sixth Sense	0	0					
3	Austria			12	4	16			4,000 €	-
4	France	Gregory Cottard	Pepyt'des Elfs	0	12					
4	France	Regis Villain	Made in la Chapel	5	9					
4	France	Caroline Nicolas	Mozart de Beny	9	0					
4	France	Aymeric Azzolino	Looping d'Elle	5	4					
4	France			10	13	23			2,200 €	-
4	Ukraine	Ferenc Szentirmai	Nifrane de Kreisker	4	8					
4	Ukraine	Oleksandr Onyshchenko	Comte d'Arsouilles	1	12					
4	Ukraine	Oleg Krasyuk	Caligula	5	0					
4	Ukraine	Cassio Rivetti	Temple Road	12	5					
4	Ukraine			10	13	23			2,200 €	-
6	Netherlands	Peter Bulthuis	Whisper	8	9					
6	Netherlands	Anouk Kort	Wonderland	0	8					
6	Netherlands	Jody van Gerwen	Tantalus	8	8					
6	Netherlands			16	25	41			1,400 €	-

(Top 6 of 12 Teams)
Grey penalties points do not count for the team result.

==== FEI Nations Cup of Slovakia ====
CSIO 3* – July 19, 2012 to July 22, 2012 – Bratislava, Slovakia
Competition: Friday, July 20, 2012, prize money: 24 000 €

	Team	Rider	Horse	Round A	Round B	Total penalties	Jump-off		Prize money €	scoring points
	Team	Rider	Horse	Penalties	Penalties	Total penalties	Penalties	Time (s)	Prize money €	scoring points
1	Germany	Andreas Brenner	Showman	0	4					
1	Germany	Henrik Griese	Caprys	4	0					
1	Germany	Thorsten Wittenberg	Connaught	0	4					
1	Germany	Jan Wernke	Queen Mary	0	0					
1	Germany			0	4	4			7,200 €	-
2	Austria	Dieter Köfler	Prince de Vaux	0	0					
2	Austria	Astrid Kneifel	Duc de Revel	did not start	8					
2	Austria	Stefanie Bistan	Juvina	0	4					
2	Austria	Stefan Eder	Cilly van Dijk	0	0					
2	Austria			0	12	12			4,500 €	-
2	France	Aymeric Azzolino	Looping d'Elle	4	4					
2	France	Caroline Nicolas	Mozart de Beny	0	4					
2	France	Regis Villain	Made in la Chapel	4	0					
2	France	Gregory Cottard	Pepyt'des Elfs	0	eliminated					
2	France			4	8	12			4,500 €	-
4	Italy	Matteo Giunti	Bambino	0	4					
4	Italy	Massimiliano Ferrario	Acamar	1	8					
4	Italy	Marta Bottanelli	Risolde	4	4					
4	Italy	Alessia Maroni	Tantalus	1	5					
4	Italy			2	13	15			2,600 €	-
5	Czech Republic	Jiri Skrivan	Kalisto	5	4					
5	Czech Republic	Zuzana Zelinkova	Lukas Ninja	4	8					
5	Czech Republic	Jiri Luza	Ronaldo S	0	8					
5	Czech Republic	Ales Opatrny	Connycor	4	0					
5	Czech Republic			8	12	20			2,000 €	10
5	Belgium	Valerie van de Pol	Wernsen	8	4					
5	Belgium	Quinten Bradt	Green Sleeps Orage	4	eliminated					
5	Belgium	Gilles Detry	Catwalk Capone	4	0					
5	Belgium	Alexander Kumps	Cru d'Avril Z	4	4					
5	Belgium			12	8	20			2,000 €	-

(Top 6 of 12 Teams)
Grey penalties points do not count for the team result.

==== FEI Nations Cup of Lithuania ====
CSIO 3* – August 10, 2012 to August 12, 2012 – Vazgaikiemis, Lithuania
Competition: Sunday, August 12, 2012 – Start: 3:00 pm, prize money: € 30,000

	Team	Rider	Horse	Round A	Round B	Total penalties	Jump-off		Prize money €	scoring points
	Team	Rider	Horse	Penalties	Penalties	Total penalties	Penalties	Time (s)	Prize money €	scoring points
1	Poland	Łukasz Brzóska	Oceane du Libaire	8	0					
1	Poland	Ewa Mazurowska	Ponita	0	20					
1	Poland	Paulina Wielgorska	Pi Quatorze	5	13					
1	Poland	Radoslaw Zalewski	Wendalineke	5	0					
1	Poland			10	13	23			9,900 €	10
2	Belarus	Vasil Ivanou	Lodonkor	0	8					
2	Belarus	Maxim Kryna	Amantus HB	1	0					
2	Belarus	Ibragim Vaskov	Rapide Umorkus	5	13					
2	Belarus	Yahor Morotski	Wacantos	23	10					
2	Belarus			6	18	24			7,950 €	7
3	Russia	Olga Chechina	Aleqs	9	8					
3	Russia	Alexandr Belekhov	Sancho Pansa	16	16					
3	Russia	Anna Gromzina	Pimlico	4	4					
3	Russia	Vladimir Beletskiy	Littlefoot	5	4					
3	Russia			18	16	34			5,400 €	6
4	Estonia	Gunnar Klettenberg	Lance S	15	5					
4	Estonia	Andrus Kallaste	Ex Calibur	5	8					
4	Estonia	Urmas Raag	Axel du Beaumont	13	5					
4	Estonia	Tiit Kivisild	Calina	eliminated	eliminated					
4	Estonia			33	18	51			3,900 €	5
5	Lithuania	Nerijus Šipaila	Lady Sieglinn	20	9					
5	Lithuania	Kostas Gaigalas	Casmir Hom	12	8					
5	Lithuania	Andrius Petrovas	Van Helsing	24	24					
5	Lithuania	Benas Gutkauskas	Carolien van het Scheefkasteel	0	8					
5	Lithuania			32	25	57			2,850 €	4
—	Latvia	Aleksandrs Šakurovs	Ladiesman	eliminated						
—	Latvia	Kristaps Neretnieks	Ishor II	did not start						
—	Latvia	Andis Varna	Chiara	did not start						
—	Latvia			—						0

Grey penalties points do not count for the team result, in the second round only three riders per team are allowed to start.

==== FEI Nations Cup of Russia ====
CSIO 5* – August 23, 2012 to August 26, 2012 – Moscow, Russia
Competition: Friday, August 23, 2012 – Start: 5:00 pm, prize money: € 80,000

	Team	Rider	Horse	Round A	Round B	Total penalties	Jump-off		Prize money €	scoring points
	Team	Rider	Horse	Penalties	Penalties	Total penalties	Penalties	Time (s)	Prize money €	scoring points
1	Poland	Lukasz Wasilewski	Wavantos van de Renvillehoeve	4	4					
1	Poland	Slawomir Uchwat	Negro	4	8					
1	Poland	Antoni Tomaszewski	Trojka	4	12					
1	Poland	Piotr Morsztyn	Osadkowski van Halen	0	0					
1	Poland			8	12	20			22,500 €	10
2	Russia	Vladimir Tuganov	Amarok	8	0					
2	Russia	Anna Gromzina	Pimlico	4	4					
2	Russia	Vladimir Beletskiy	Littlefoot	4	8					
2	Russia	Natalia Simonia	Gardemarin	8	8					
2	Russia			16	12	28			17,500 €	7
3	Belarus	Vasil Ivanou	Lodonkor	8	4					
3	Belarus	Maxim Kryna	Amantus HB	0	16					
3	Belarus	Yahor Morotski	Wacantos	8	12					
3	Belarus	Ibragim Vaskov	Rapide Umorkus	4	8					
3	Belarus			12	24	36			13,500 €	6
4	Lithuania	Nerijus Sipaila	Lady Sieglinn	28	12					
4	Lithuania	Danielius Gutkauskas	Chromas	16	16					
4	Lithuania	Andrius Petrovas	Van Helsing	8	27					
4	Lithuania	Benas Gutkauskas	Lascar	0	0					
4	Lithuania			24	28	52			10,500 €	5
4	Estonia	Gunnar Klettenberg	Bingo	eliminated	eliminated					
4	Estonia	Rein Pill	Konstantinos KS	8	16					
4	Estonia	Andrus Kallaste	EX Calibur	16	4					
4	Estonia	Urmas Raag	Axel du Beaumont	12	4					
4	Estonia			36	24	60			8,500 €	4
6	Latvia	Dainis Ozols	Alibi	40	retired					
6	Latvia	Kristaps Neretnieks	Ishor II	12	did not start					
6	Latvia	Andis Varna	Bazilio	12	did not start					
6	Latvia			64	—	—			7,500 €	3

Grey penalties points do not count for the team result, in the second round only three riders per team are allowed to start.

==== FEI Nations Cup of Greece ====
CSIO 2* – September 13, 2012 to September 16, 2012 – Markopoulo Olympic Equestrian Centre, Markopoulo Mesogaias, Greece
cancelled

== North and South American League ==
=== Standings ===
The best-placed team of the 2012 North and South American League, Canada, have the permission to start in the 2012 Promotional League Final.

A team of a country that belongs to one of the 2012 FEI Nations Cup teams can not earn points in this league. Teams who are part of one of the other Promotional Leagues also can not earn points in this league.

	Team	Points				Total
	Team	CAN (Canada)	ARG (Argentina)	USA (United States)	BRA (Brazil)	Total
1	Canada	10	10	10	—	30
2	United States	6	5	7	—	18
3	Argentina	—	7	—	10	17
4	Mexico	7	—	6	—	13
5	Uruguay	—	—	—	7	7
6	Chile	—	6	—	—	6
7	Colombia	—	—	5	—	5
8	Venezuela	—	—	4	—	4

=== Results ===
==== FEI Nations Cup of Canada (2011) ====
CSIO 5* – September 7, 2011 to September 11, 2011 – Spruce Meadows, Calgary, Canada
Competition: Saturday, September 10, 2011 at 2:00 pm

	Team	Rider	Horse	Round A	Round B	Total penalties	Jump-off		Prize money Can$	scoring points
	Team	Rider	Horse	Penalties	Penalties	Total penalties	Penalties	Time (s)	Prize money Can$	scoring points
1	France	Jerome Hurel	Ohm de Ponthual	1	5					
1	France	Marc Dilasser	Obiwan de Piliore	8	0					
1	France	Roger-Yves Bost	Ideal de la Loge	0	4					
1	France			9	9	18			Can$115,000	-
2	Canada	Jonathan Asselin	Showgirl	18	8					
2	Canada	Tiffany Foster	Southwind VDL	9	12					
2	Canada	Ian Millar	Star Power	0	4					
2	Canada	Eric Lamaze	Hickstead	0	0					
2	Canada			9	12	21			Can$75,000	10
3	Switzerland	Martin Fuchs	Principal	0	8					
3	Switzerland	Marc Oertly	Tamira IV	12	8					
3	Switzerland	Simone Wettstein	Cash and Go	1	0					
3	Switzerland	Christina Liebherr	Callas Sitte Z	12	4					
3	Switzerland			13	12	25			Can$50,000	-
4	Great Britain	Tim Stockdale	Kalico Bay	8	4					
4	Great Britain	Ellen Whitaker	Locarno	4	13					
4	Great Britain	Gemma Paternoster	Osiris	5	-					
4	Great Britain	Peter Charles	Nevada	1	1					
4	Great Britain			10	18	28			Can$40,000	-
5	Mexico	Santiago Lambre	Wonami van den Aard	8	5					
5	Mexico	Aurora Rangel de Alba	Cargo de L'Obstination	-	-					
5	Mexico	Nicolas Pizarro	Skylubet	4	13					
5	Mexico	Jaime Guerra	Utopias	4	8					
5	Mexico			9	26	35			Can$25,000	7

(Top 5 of 10 Teams)

==== FEI Nations Cup of Argentina (2011) ====
CSIO 2*-W – November 23, 2011 to November 27, 2011 – Haras El Capricho, Capilla del Señor, Argentina
Competition: Friday, November 25, 2011 – Start: 3:30 pm, prize money: US$ 12,000

	Team	Rider	Horse	Round A	Round B	Total penalties	Jump-off		scoring points
	Team	Rider	Horse	Penalties	Penalties	Total penalties	Penalties	Time (s)	scoring points
1	Canada	Tiffany Foster	Victor	4	0				
1	Canada	Emily George	Quidam's Ramiro	0	13				
1	Canada	Angela Lawrence	Utan	1	4				
1	Canada	Jonathan Asselin	Makavoy	8	did not start				
1	Canada			5	17	22			10
2	Argentina I	Matias Albarracin	Bally Cullen Maid	9	5				
2	Argentina I	Bruno Passaro	Silver Patacon Quality	9	0				
2	Argentina I	Ricardo Dircie	Llavaneras H.J. Aries	0	4				
2	Argentina I	Martin Dopazo	Chicago Z	12	4				
2	Argentina I			18	8	26			7
3	Brazil I	Yuri Mansur Gueiros	Chico Z	5	4				
3	Brazil I	Pedro Junqueira Muylaert	Ducati	4	4				
3	Brazil I	José Roberto Reynoso Fernandez	Gina Jmen	5	12				
3	Brazil I	Andre Americo de Miranda	Blaton	5	4				
3	Brazil I			14	12	26			-
4	Chile	Joaquin Larrain	Candidatus	4	12				
4	Chile	Octavio Perez Arce	Royal Berry	4	8				
4	Chile	Carlos Milthaler	As Hyo Altanero	0	0				
4	Chile			8	20	28			6

(Top 4 of 7 Teams)

==== FEI Nations Cup of the United States ====
CSIO 4* – February 29, 2012 to March 4, 2012 – Wellington, Florida, United States
Competition: Friday, March 2, 2012 – Start: 7:00 pm, prize money: US$ 75,000

	Team	Rider	Horse	Round A	Round B	Total penalties	Jump-off		Prize money US$	scoring points
	Team	Rider	Horse	Penalties	Penalties	Total penalties	Penalties	Time (s)	Prize money US$	scoring points
1	Germany	Jörg Oppermann	Che Guevara	0	4					
1	Germany	David Will	Don CeSar	0	0					
1	Germany	Johannes Ehning	Salvador V	4	0					
1	Germany	Meredith Michaels-Beerbaum	Checkmate	0	did not start					
1	Germany			0	4	4			22,500	-
2	Ireland	Shane Sweetnam	Amaretto D'Arco	0	4					
2	Ireland	Richie Moloney	Slieveanorra	4	0					
2	Ireland	Darragh Kerins	Lisona	4	4					
2	Ireland	Cian O'Connor	Blue Loyd	0	0					
2	Ireland			4	4	8			18,000	-
3	Canada	Ian Millar	Star Power	0	0					
3	Canada	Tiffany Foster	Victor	0	8					
3	Canada	Yann Candele	Lansdowne	9	12					
3	Canada	Eric Lamaze	Derly Chin de Muze	0	0					
3	Canada			0	8	8			15,000	10
4	United States	Lauren Hough	Quick Study	0	4					
4	United States	Mario Deslauriers	Cella	8	6					
4	United States	Margie Goldstein-Engle	Indigo	eliminated	8					
4	United States	Beezie Madden	Simon	0	4					
4	United States			8	14	22			6,500	7
4	Great Britain	Nick Skelton	Big Star	0	0					
4	Great Britain	Tina Fletcher	Ursula XII	8	4					
4	Great Britain	Scott Brash	Sanctos van het Gravenhof	12	8					
4	Great Britain	Ben Maher	Tripple X	9	1					
4	Great Britain			17	5	22			6,500	-
6	France	Marie Hecart	Opal du Golfe	8	8					
6	France	Alexandra Paillot	Oceane de Nantuel	8	8					
6	France	Nicolas Paillot	Infine Rivage	12	0					
6	France	Cedric Angot	Olympic de Chamant	12	8					
6	France			28	16	44			6,500	-

(Top 6 of 10 Teams)

==== FEI Nations Cup of Brazil ====
CSIO 4*-W – May 3, 2012 to May 6, 2012 – Porto Alegre, Brazil
Competition: Friday, May 4, 2012 – Start: 3:15 pm

	Team	Rider	Horse	Round A	Round B	Total penalties	Jump-off		scoring points
	Team	Rider	Horse	Penalties	Penalties	Total penalties	Penalties	Time (s)	scoring points
1	France	Aymeric Azzolino	Looping d´Elle	0	0				
1	France	Marie Robert	Pidam de Paban	8	0				
1	France	Oliver Robert	Olala de Buissy	0	1				
1	France			8	1	9			-
2	Brazil	Fabio Leivas	Catija ET Z	8	4				
2	Brazil	Geraldo Gomes de Lemos	Piemonte Assolute RG	eliminated	retired				
2	Brazil	Yuri Mansur Guerios	Vip van de Keersop	4	5				
2	Brazil	Francisco José Mesquita Musa	Premiere Xindoctro Metodo	0	4				
2	Brazil			12	13	25			-
3	Germany	Tim Rieskamp-Goedeking	Corvin	8	4				
3	Germany	Torben Köhlbrandt	Skala	eliminated	4				
3	Germany	Holger Wenz	Galina	4	5				
3	Germany	Hans-Torben Rüder	Orlanda	8	0				
3	Germany			20	8	28			-
4	Belgium	Dominique Joassin	Dark de la Hart	8	1				
4	Belgium	Fabienne Lange Daigneux	Reine-Fee des Hazalles	4	8				
4	Belgium	Jerome Guery	Waldo	8	0				
4	Belgium			20	9	29			-

(Top 4 of 6 Teams)

== 2012 Promotional League Final ==
The 2012 Promotional League Final, the fourth Promotional League Final, was held in Barcelona, Spain, on September 23, 2012 at 3:30 pm. The competition was held during the 2012 CSIO Barcelona, a (CSIO 5* horse show. A purse of € 90,000 was offered at the Promotional League Final, with each of the seven competing teams receiving a share.

The winning team is qualified for the League "Europe I" of the 2013 Furusiyya FEI Nations Cup.

	Team	Rider	Horse	Round A	Round B	Total penalties	Prize money €
	Team	Rider	Horse	Penalties	Penalties	Total penalties	Prize money €
1	Spain	Pilar Lucrecia Cordon	Nuage Bleu	0	0		
1	Spain	Paola Amilibia Puig	Prunella d'Ariel	4	4		
1	Spain	Manuel Añon	Baldo DS	0	4		
1	Spain	Sergio Álvarez Moya	Action-Breaker	4	0		
1	Spain			4	4	8	30,000 €
2	Sweden	Angelica Augustsson	Quickdiamond	8	12		
2	Sweden	Douglas Lindelöw	Udermus	0	4		
2	Sweden	Daniel Zetterman	Glory Days	0	4		
2	Sweden	Peder Fredricson	Cash In	0	4		
2	Sweden			0	12	12	25,000 €
3	Italy	Lucia Vizzini	Quinta Roo	4	4		
3	Italy	Roberto Arioldi	Lagerfeld	8	5		
3	Italy	Luca Marziani	Wivina	0	8		
3	Italy	Juan Carlos García	Bonzai van de Warande	8	0		
3	Italy			12	9	21	15,000 €
4	Canada	Tiffany Foster	Southwind VDL	9	8		
4	Canada	Courtney Vince	Valetto	12	1		
4	Canada	Jonathan Asselin	Showgirl	0	5		
4	Canada	Lisa Carlsen	La Boom	8	24		
4	Canada			17	14	31	5,000 €
5	Poland	Andrzej Lemanski	Bischof L	12	16		
5	Poland	Piotr Morsztyn	Osadkowski van Halen	4	0		
5	Poland	Lukasz Wasilewski	Wavantos van de Renvillehoeve	4	12		
5	Poland	Jan Chrzanowski	Newton du Haut Bois	5	8		
5	Poland			13	20	33	5,000 €
6	Russia	Vladimir Beletsky	Littlefoot	4	20		
6	Russia	Anna Gromzina	Pimlico	8	4		
6	Russia	Olga Chechina	Aleqs	20	17		
6	Russia	Vladimir Tuganov	Amarok	4	8		
6	Russia			16	29	45	5,000 €
5	Denmark	Emilie Martinsen	Caballero	4	12		
5	Denmark	Karina Rie Truelsen	Quite Quick	16	17		
5	Denmark	Linnea Ericsson	Damgaardens Extens	0	did not start		
5	Denmark			20	retired	—	5,000 €
