= Bugan (disambiguation) =

The Bugan language is an Austroasiatic language.

Bugan may also refer to:

- Bugan-myeon, a township in North Gyeongsang Province, South Korea
- Carmen Bugan (born 1970), Romanian-American poet and writer
- Michael Bugan (born 1987), Slovakian equestrian athlete
