= Lisa Carlsen =

Lisa Carlsen may refer to:

- Lisa Carlsen (equestrian)
- Lisa Carlsen (basketball)
