= Uthopia =

Dutch Warmblood stallion (2001–2025)

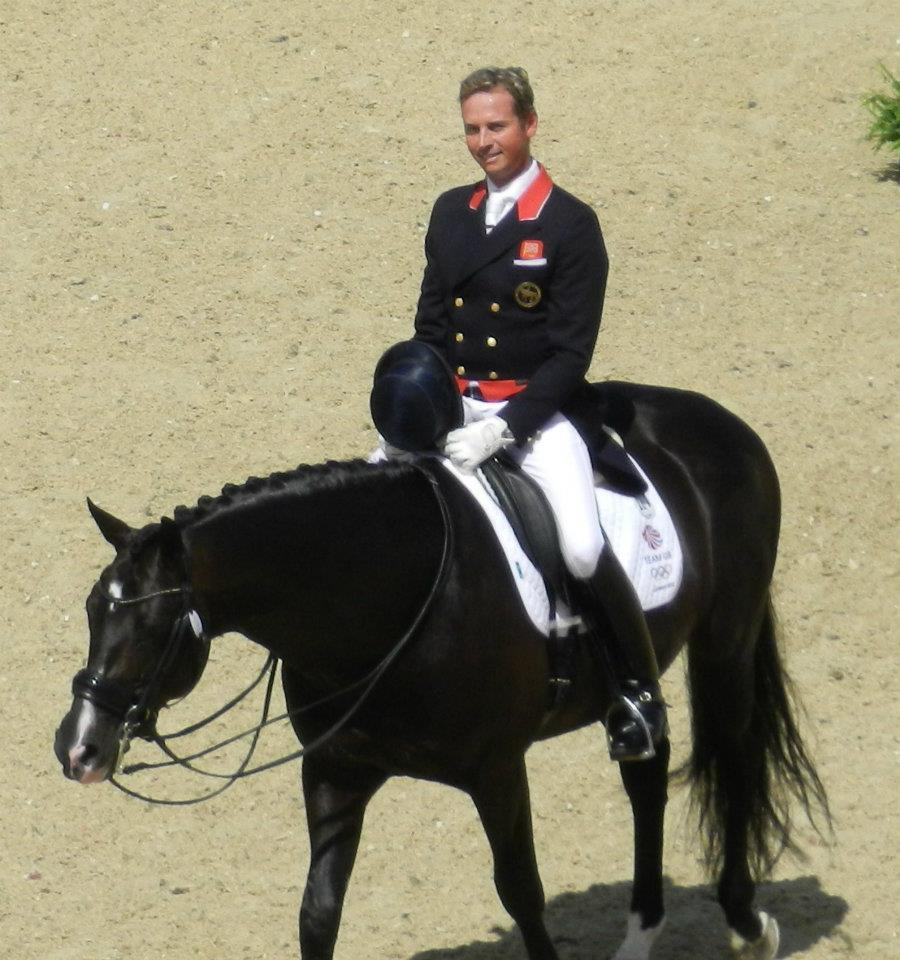
- Uthopia, ridden by Carl Hester at the 2012 Summer Olympics
- Breed: Dutch Warmblood
- Sire: Metall
- Grandsire: Olympic Ferro
- Dam: Odelia
- Maternal grandsire: Inspekteur
- Sex: Stallion
- Foaled: 23 April 2001
- Died: 1 December 2025 (aged 24)
- Country: Netherlands
- Colour: Dark bay
- Trainer: Carl Hester

Medal record

Equestrian

Representing Great Britain

Olympic Games
Gold medal – first place	2012 London	Team dressage

Uthopia (23 April 2001 – 1 December 2025) was a Dutch Warmblood stallion ridden by the British equestrian Carl Hester in the sport of dressage.

Hester and Uthopia were selected to represent Great Britain in the 2012 London Olympics winning gold in the team dressage. Together they won a total of five Championship medals, two individual silvers at the 2011 European Championships in addition to Olympic gold. The horse was also ridden in competition by Hester's protégé Charlotte Dujardin, most recently at the Amsterdam leg of the FEI World Cup series in January 2018.

Uthopia died on 1 December 2025, at the age of 24. The death was announced alongside that of Valegro. Both died by euthanasia.
