= Henri Ruoste =

Finnish dressage rider

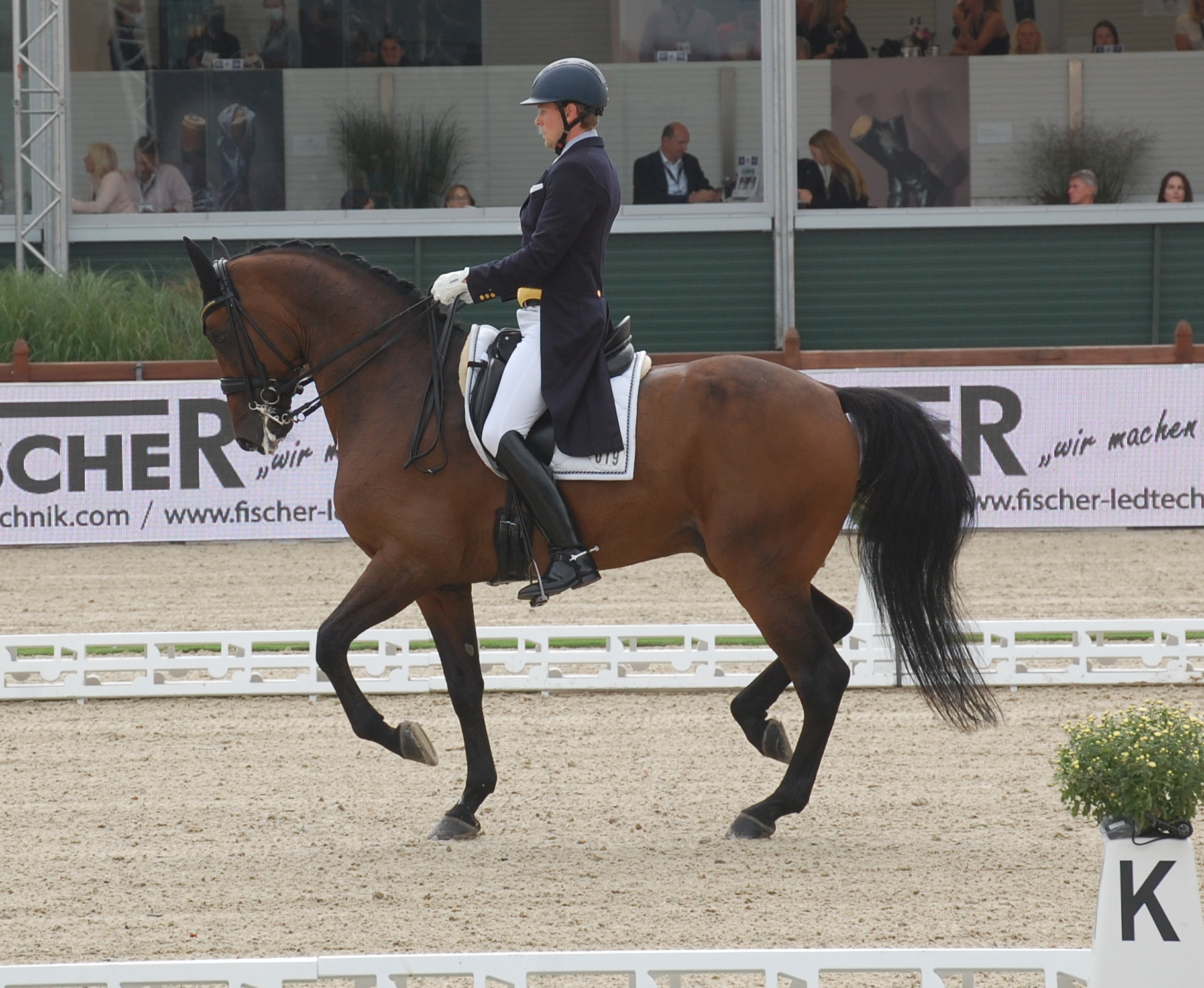
- Henri Ruoste and Kontestro (2021)

Personal information
- Nationality: Finnish
- Born: February 18, 1982 (age 44) Rauma, Finland
- Website: ruoste-dressage.com

Sport
- Country: Finland
- Sport: Equestrian
- Club: Gut Bertingloh (GER); Turun Seudun Ratsastajat (FIN)
- Now coaching: Hiroyuki Kitahara; Christian Zimmermann

Achievements and titles
- Olympic finals: Tokyo 2020; Paris 2024
- Regional finals: Herning 2013; Rotterdam 2019; Hagen 2021
- Personal bests: 77.314% (GP); 76.745% (GPS); 82.600% (GPF)

Henri Ruoste (born 18 February 1982, Rauma, Finland) is a Finnish Olympic dressage rider. He competed at three European Championships (in 2013, 2019 and 2021). He represented the Finnish team at the 2020 Tokyo Olympic Games and the 2024 Paris Olympic Games.

== Career ==
Ruoste started riding as a child following encouragement from his mother. He moved from Finland to Germany in 2001, in order to pursue a career in dressage and horse training. He went to England to study under Kyra Kyrklund in 2006, before returning to Germany in 2011.

He made his international championship debut at the 2013 European Dressage Championships in Herning, where he finished 10th with the Finnish team and 28th individually aboard Hungarian Sport Horse Jojo AZ. Four years later, Ruoste was the reserve rider for the European Championships in Gothenburg.

In 2019, Ruoste made his return to the European Championships in Rotterdam, where he placed 15th in both individual competitions (Special and Freestyle), and 13th in the team competition. He competed aboard Danish Warmblood Rossetti, with whom he went on to qualify for the Tokyo 2020 Olympics that same year.

In 2020, Ruoste started competing aboard Belgian Warmblood Kontestro DB. Following a string of high scores, as well as 4th place achieved at the 2021 Doha CDI5* competition. Ruoste and Kontestro competed at the postponed Tokyo Olympics in 2021, finishing 52nd individually. During the European Championships in Hagen the same year, he achieved his best rank during a major championship; he finished 6th in the individual competition and 6th with the Finnish team. This is the best team result for Finland in history.

== Personal life ==
Ruoste is married to German dressage rider Senta Kirchhoff and has a son. They run a stable in Menden.
