= Stefan Lehfellner =

Austrian equestrian

Personal information
- Born: 16 February 1983 (age 42); Wels, Austria

Sport
- Country: Austria
- Sport: Equestrian

Achievements and titles
- Olympic finals: 2024 Olympic Games
- Regional finals: Riesenbeck 2023

Stefan Lehfellner (born 16 February 1983 in Wels, Austria) is an Austrian equestrian athlete. He represented Austria at the 2023 FEI European Dressage Championships and the 2022 FEI World Championships in Herning, Denmark.

Lehfellner represented the Austrian team at the 2024 Summer Olympics in Paris, which was his first Olympic appearance. His partner Victoria Max-Theurer represented Austria at four Olympics and in Paris they were both part of the Olympic team.
