= Mikaela Soratie =

Finnish equestrian

Personal information
- Nickname: Keela
- Born: 22 November 1982 (age 43) Helsinki, Finland

Sport
- Country: Finland
- Sport: Equestrian

Mikaela Soratie (born 22 November 1982, Helsinki) is a Finnish dressage rider. She competed at the 2019 FEI European Championships and the 2021 European Dressage Championships, she was also part of the Finnish team during the 2022 FEI World Championships.
