= Valegro =

British world champion dressage horse (2002–2025)

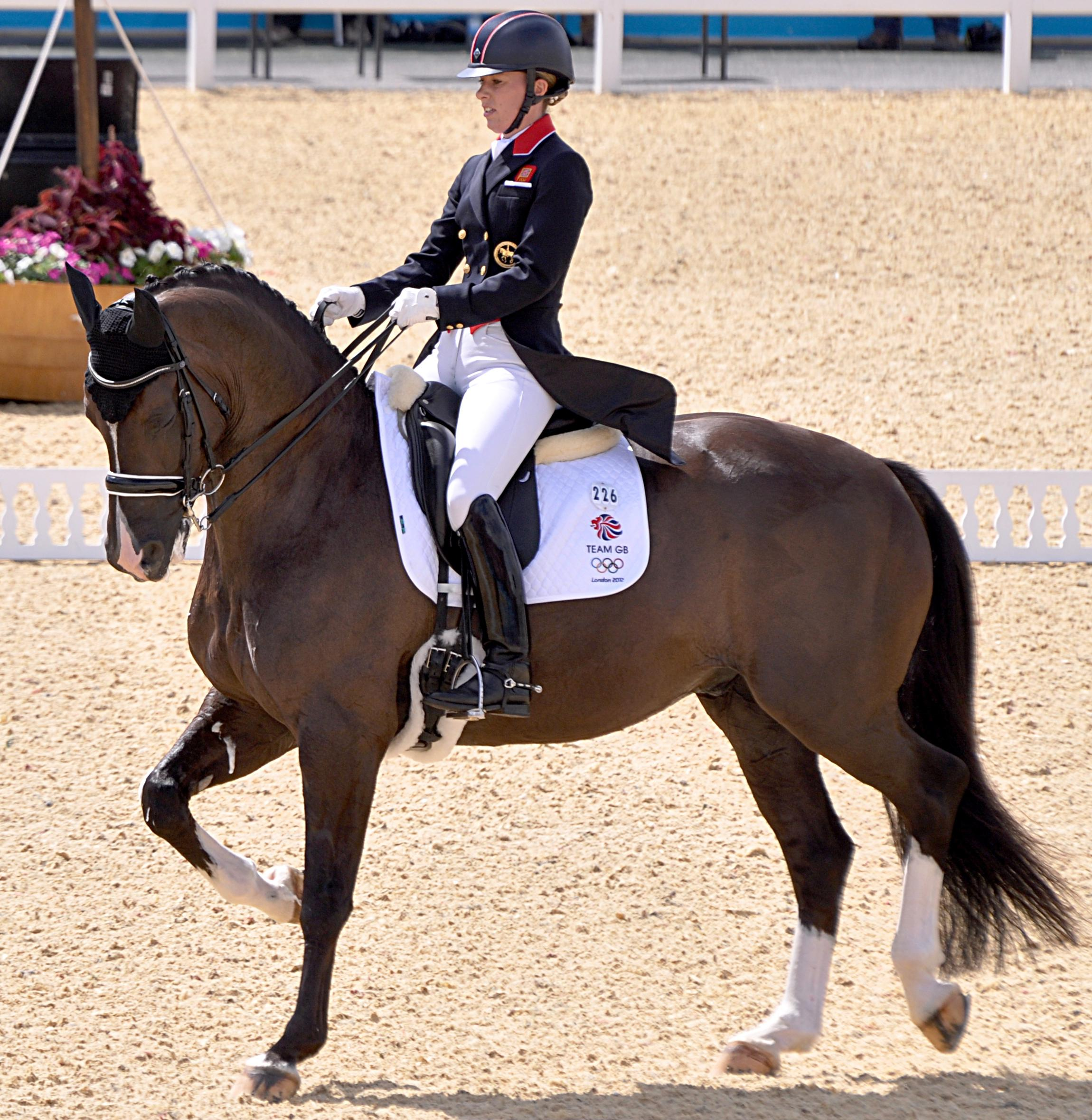
- With Charlotte Dujardin at the 2012 Olympics
- Breed: Dutch Warmblood
- Sire: Negro
- Grandsire: Ferro
- Dam: Maifleur
- Maternal grandsire: Gershwin
- Sex: Gelding
- Foaled: 5 July 2002
- Died: 1 December 2025 (aged 23)
- Country: Netherlands
- Colour: Dark Bay
- Owner: Carl Hester Rowena Luard Anne Barrott
- Trainer: Carl Hester
- Rider: Charlotte Dujardin

Record
- Grand Prix world record, Grand Prix Special world record, Grand Prix Freestyle world record

Major wins
- Olympic Individual Gold Brazil 2016, Olympic Team Gold London 2012; Olympic Individual Gold London 2012; European Team Bronze Herning 2013; European Individual Gold Grand Prix Special Herning 2013; European Individual Gold Grand Prix Freestyle Herning 2013; FEI Reem Acra World Cup Dressage Lyon 2014; Team Silver World Equestrian Games Normandy 2014; Individual Gold Grand Prix Special World Equestrian Games Normandy 2014; Individual Gold Grand Prix Freestyle World Equestrian Games Normandy 2014; Winner of the FEI Reem Acra World Cup Dressage Las Vegas 2015; European Team Silver Aachen 2015; European Individual Gold Grand Prix Special Aachen 2015; European Individual Gold Grand Prix Freestyle Aachen 2015

Olympic medal record

Equestrian
Gold medal – first place	2012 London	Team dressage
Gold medal – first place	2012 London	Individual dressage
Gold medal – first place	2016 Rio de Janeiro	Individual dressage
Silver medal – second place	2016 Rio de Janeiro	Team dressage

Valegro (5 July 2002 – 1 December 2025) was a gelding ridden by the British equestrian Charlotte Dujardin in the sport of dressage. He stood 16.2 hands (66 inches, 168 cm) and had the stable name of Blueberry. He was a double World Champion in Dressage, he won Grand Prix Special and Grand Prix Freestyle at the World.

== Career ==
Having joined Carl Hester's stable in Newent, Gloucestershire as a groom, Dujardin was offered the opportunity to develop the novice Dutch Warmblood gelding by Hester and co-owner Roly Luard, with the later intention of the horse being ridden in competition by Hester.

Valegro remained unbeaten since CDI Kapellen in January 2012.

The combination became part of the team which won gold in a European Dressage Championships event in Rotterdam. They then won the FEI World Cup grand prix at London Olympia in 2011, setting a world record for the Olympic grand prix special discipline scoring 88.022%, in April 2012.

Selected to represent Great Britain in the 2012 Summer Olympics, in the first round they set a new Olympic record of 83.784%. On 7 August 2012 the pair were members of the team which won the gold medal in the team dressage event. Two days later they won the gold in the individual dressage event with a score of 90.089%.

At the 2013 European Championships in Herning, Charlotte and Valegro won both the Grand Prix and the Grand Prix Special with 85.94% and 85.69%.

At Olympia 2013 he beat the Grand Prix Freestyle world record (by around 2%) he set the new record to 93.975% (the record was previously held by Edward Gal and Moorlands Totilas). At Olympia 2014 he improved his own Grand Prix Freestyle world record (94.3%) and his own Grand Prix world record (87.46%).

Valegro also achieved a gold medal in the individual dressage at the Rio de Janeiro 2016 Summer Olympics with a score of 93.857%, and was an integral part of the Silver medal winning Team for Great Britain, at the same event. In 2016 Breyer released a model of Valegro.

== Retirement ==
On 14 December 2016, Valegro and Charlotte Dujardin marked his retirement from competition with a performance given at the London International Horse Show 2016 and televised live by the BBC. It was followed by a farewell ceremony with Valegro's owners, and companions Charlotte Dujardin, Carl Hester and Alan Davies.

== Death ==
Valegro died on 1 December 2025, at the age of 23. The death was announced alongside that of Uthopia. Both died by euthanasia.

== Breeding ==
Valegro was sired by the legendary KWPN stallion Negro, by Olympic Ferro.

== See also ==
- List of historical horses
