= Alejandro Sánchez del Barco =

Spain dressage rider

Alejandro Sánchez Del Barco
Personal information
- Full name: Alejandro Sánchez Del Barco
- Born: 12 June 1993 (age 33) Fuengirola, Spain

Sport
- Country: Spain
- Sport: Equestrian

Alejandro Sánchez Del Barco (born 12 June 1993, Fuengirola) is a dressage rider from Spain. He competed at the 2022 World Championships in Herning, where he made it to the final Freestyle, finishing fourteenth. He also competed at the 2023 European Championships and represented Spain at the World Championships for young dressage horses in 2021, 2022 and 2023.
