= Vazgaikiemis =

- Village
- Location in Lithuania
- Coordinates: 54°34′52″N 23°53′10″E
- Country: Lithuania
- County: Kaunas County
- Municipality: Prienai district municipality
- Eldership: Balbieriškis eldership

Population (2011)
  - Total: 41
- Time zone: UTC+2 (EET)
  - Summer (DST): UTC+3 (EEST)

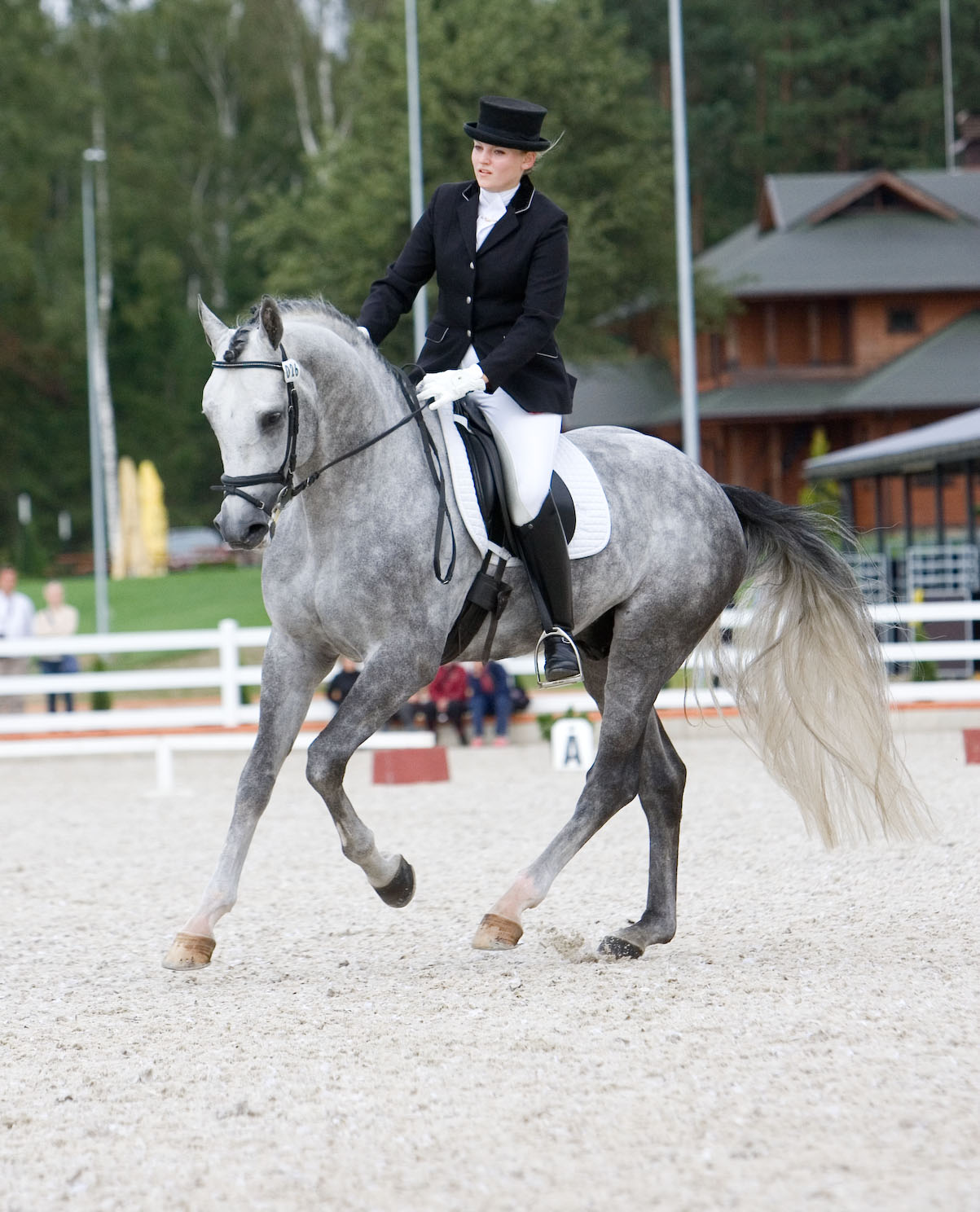
Justina Vanagaitė riding Sir Paul, Vazgaikiemis, 2011

Vazgaikiemis is a village in Prienai district municipality, in Kaunas County, central Lithuania. According to the 2011 census, the town has a population of 41 people.

== Equestrian ==
Village is famous because of its show jumping field. Vaizgaikiemis hosts National Lithuanian Equestrian jumping championships and various international events. In 2010, Vaizgaikiemis hosted FEI World Cup Jumping 2010/2011 North Sub-League 6th stage. In 2012, the Lithuanian Show jumping Nations Cup horse show was held here.
