= Johanna Due Boje =

Sweden dressage rider

Johanna Due-Boje
Personal information
- Full name: Johanna Due-Boje
- Born: 28 March 1989 (age 37)

Sport
- Country: Sweden
- Sport: Equestrian

Johanna Due-Boje (born 28 March 1989) is a dressage rider from Sweden. She competed at the 2023 European Championships in Riesenbeck. Due Boje also competed at the 2023 World Cup Finals in Omaha, Nebraska, finishing on the 8th place.
