= Ferenc Szentirmai =

Hungarian equestrian (born 1983)

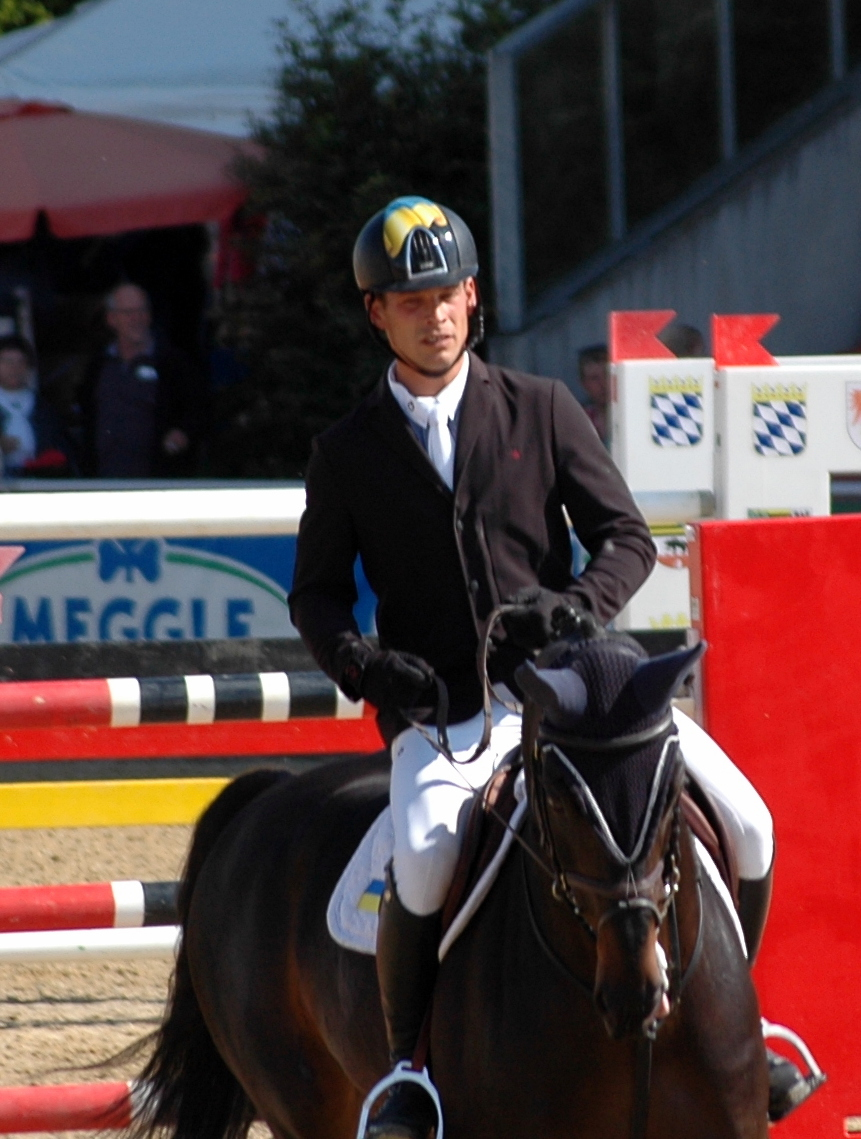
- Szentirmai in 2014

Personal information
- Nationality: Ukrainian
- Born: 29 November 1983 (age 41); Hungary
- Height: 1.80 m (5 ft 11 in)
- Weight: 75 kg (165 lb)

Sport
- Country: Ukraine
- Sport: Jumping

Ferenc Szentirmai (born 29 November 1983) is a Hungarian-born show jumping rider who has been representing Ukraine since 2010. He competed at the 2016 Summer Olympics in Rio de Janeiro, Brazil, where he placed 13th team and was eliminated in the first round of the individual competition.

Szentirmai competed at the 2014 World Equestrian Games and at the 2015 European Championships. His best result is 8th place in the team event from 2014.
