= Gunnar Klettenberg =

Estonian equestrian

Gunnar Klettenberg (born 27 October 1967) is an Estonian equestrian.

He was born in Viljandi. In 1992 he graduated from Estonian Agricultural University in veterinary science.

He began his riding career in 1978. His coaches have been Jaanis Roos, Andrus Mäerand, Aadi Pärtel and Zigmantas Šarka. Since 1998 he is a member of Estonian national riding team. He has competed at 2011 FEI World Cup Finals. He is multiple-times Estonian champion. He is the first Estonian who surpassed 2 m in equestrian high jump (Estonian: ratsutamise kõrgushüpe) (2000).

In 1997–1999, 2001, 2005, 2008, 2011–2012 and 2015 he was named as Best Show Jumper of Estonia.
