= Justina Vanagaitė =

Lithuanian dressage rider (born 1990)

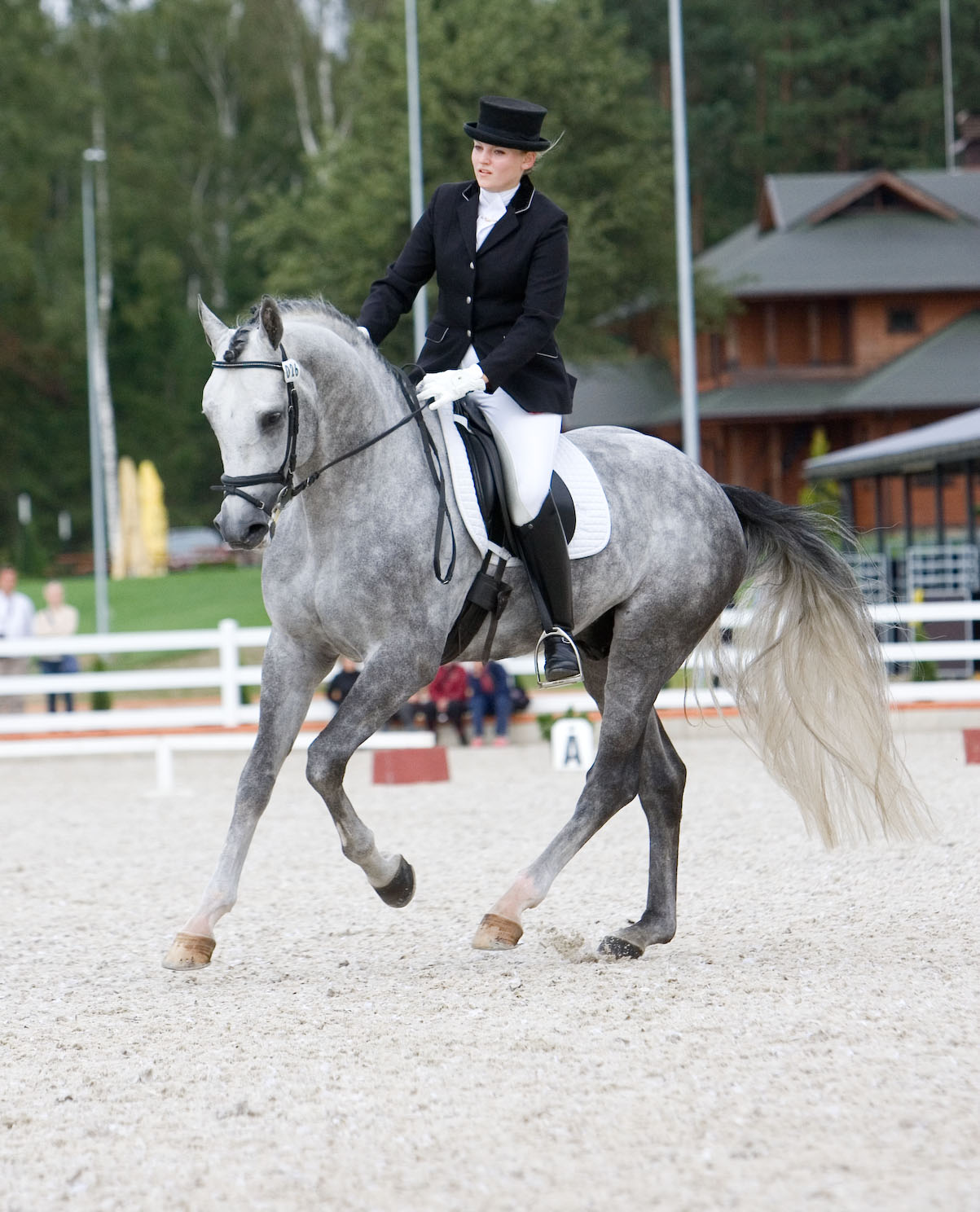
- Vanagaitė in Vazgaikiemis Grand Prix 2011

Personal information
- Full name: Justina Vanagaitė-Samuile
- Born: 3 January 1990 (age 36) Vilnius, Lithuania

Sport
- Country: Lithuania
- Sport: Equestrian
- Event: Dressage

Achievements and titles
- Olympic finals: 2024 Summer Olympics
- World finals: 2022 FEI World Equestrian Games

Justina Vanagaitė-Samuile (born 3 January 1990 in Vilnius, Lithuania) is a Lithuanian dressage rider. Representing Lithuania, she competed at the 2022 World Equestrian Games and at the 2021 European Dressage Championships. She placed 44th place in individual dressage at the 2022 World Equestrian Games with her horse Nabab.

== Personal ==
Justina started riding at the age of 13. She is a founder of Vilnius equestrian club.

== Career ==
In 2021, on her horse Nabab, she became the first representatives of Lithuania to compete in the European Dressage Championship. In June 2022, Vanagaitė won the round of the World Dressage Cup in Slovakia.

In April 2024, she competed at the World Cup Final at Riyadh, Saudi Arabia, on her 11-year-old gelding Nadab. The pair scored 75.1% to finish eighth in the freestyle. She qualified for the 2024 Paris Olympics.

== Personal bests ==
Personal bests as of March 2023
Event	Score	Horse	Venue	Date
Grand Prix	71.261	Nabab	Wierzbna, Poland	3 September 2022
Grand Prix Special	69.957	Nabab	Sankt Margarethen im Burgenland, Austria	3 July 2022
Grand Prix Freestyle	75.465	Nabab	Perila, Estonia	17 July 2022
