= Charlotte Heering =

Danish dressage rider (born 1986)

Personal information
- Full name: Charlotte Heering
- Born: Jan 15, 1986 (age 40)

Sport
- Country: Denmark
- Sport: Equestrian
- Club: Aspegaarden, Tikøb
- Coached by: Nathalie Zu Sayn-Wittgenstein
Medal record
Equestrian
Representing Denmark
European Championships
Bronze medal – third place	2021 Hagen	Team dressage

Charlotte Heering (born 15 January 1986) is a Danish dressage rider. She competed at the 2021 European Championships where she won a bronze team medal. Heering also competed at several European youth Championships from 2004 till 2007.

Heering was selected by the Danish Equestrian Federation as traveling reserve at the Olympic Games in Tokyo, Japan with her horse Bufranco.
