= Carina Cassøe Krüth =

Denmark equestrian (born 1984)

Personal information
- Full name: Carina Cassøe Krüth
- Born: Jul 27, 1984 (age 42) Slagelse, Denmark

Sport
- Country: Denmark
- Sport: Equestrian

Achievements and titles
- Olympic finals: 2020 Olympic Games
Medal record
Equestrian
Representing Denmark
World Championships
| Gold medal – first place | 2022 Herning | Team dressage |
| Bronze medal – third place | 2026 Aachen | Team dressage |
European Championships
| Bronze medal – third place | 2023 Riesenbeck | Team dressage |

Carina Cassøe Krüth (born 27 July 1984) is a Danish equestrian athlete. Cassøe Krüth competed at several World Championships for Young Dressage Horses. In 2018 she became 4th in the seven years old final with Heiline's Danciera. One year later she made her international debut in the international Grand Prix with the black mare, but in 2020 they made their breakthrough in international dressage by scoring over the 80%.

Cassøe Krüth represented Denmark at the Olympic Games in Tokyo, finishing fourth with the team and 7th in the individual final.

Cassøe Krüth won a team gold medal at the 2022 World Championships, which were held in Herning, Denmark.

In 2024, Cassøe Krüth was about to be named a reserve rider for Denmark's 2024 Olympic team, however Cassøe Krüth recused herself after video was leaked to Denmark's national federation showing her participating in horse abuse during a training incident in 2022.
