= European Equestrian Federation =

International sports governing body

European Equestrian Federation EEF
- Sport: Equestrian
- Official website: euroequestrian.eu

History
- Year of formation: September 2009; 17 years ago in Deauville, France

Demographics
- Membership size: 42 members

Affiliations
- International federation: International Federation for Equestrian Sports (FEI)
- FEI member since: 2009
- Other affiliation(s): European Olympic Committees

Governance
- President: (France) Quentin Simonet

Headquarters
- Country: Belgium
- Secretary General: (Bulgaria) Teodor Sheytanov
- Official language(s): English

The European Equestrian Federation is the governing body of equestrian in Europe. It is one of the five continental confederations making up the International Federation for Equestrian Sports. The process of establishment of the European Equestrian Federation started in March 2009 in Deauville, France. In September 2009, EEF was officially formed and headquartered in Zaventem, Belgium. The EEF consists of 40 member federations and represent the interests of European horse sport within the FEI. The EEF is committed to promoting the sport equestrianism and its good practices, developing the sport across Europe, and providing leadership for a collective European voice in the sport.

== Tournaments ==
- European Dressage Championships
- European Show Jumping Championships
- European Eventing Championships

== Members ==
- Albania
- Andorra
- Austria
- Belgium
- Bosnia and Herzegovina
- Bulgaria
- Croatia
- Czech Republic
- Cyprus
- Denmark
- Spain
- Estonia
- Finland
- France
- Great Britain
- Germany
- Greece
- Hungary
- Ireland
- Iceland
- Israel
- Italy
- Latvia
- Liechtenstein
- Lithuania
- Luxembourg
- North Macedonia
- Malta
- Monaco
- Netherlands
- Norway
- Poland
- Portugal
- Romania
- Slovenia
- San Marino
- Serbia
- Switzerland
- Slovakia
- Sweden
- Turkey
- Ukraine
