= 2021 European Dressage Championships =

Equestrian championship

2021 FEI European Dressage Championships
- Host city: Hagen, Germany
- Date(s): 7–12 September 2021
- Level: Senior
- Events: 6

The 2021 FEI European Dressage Championships was held in Hagen, Germany, from 7 to 12 September 2021. Budapest in Hungary was supposed to organise the European Championships but withdrew after the postponement of the 2020 Olympic Games to 2021. First, the FEI announced there will be no European Championships for Dressage, but after several riders, trainers, owners and the European Equestrian Federation (EEF) insisted on a European Championship, Hagen volunteered to organise it. The European Championships for show-jumping will be also held in Germany, at the show location of Olympic gold-medalist Ludger Beerbaum in Riesenbeck.

The FEI decided to allocate the European Championships for Grand Prix riders under the age of 25 as well to Hagen. It is for the first time since the introduction of this European Championship that this championship will be combined with the Championship for the seniors. In 2016, Hagen also organised the first edition of the U25 European Championships.

== Ground Jury ==
The Ground Jury during the 2021 European Dressage Championships is nominated as follows;

- (Germany) Henning Lehrmann (Ground Jury President)
- (Netherlands) Mariëtte Sanders (Ground Jury Member)
- (United Kingdom) Isobel Wessels (Ground Jury Member)
- (Finland) Maria Colliander (Ground Jury Member)
- (Austria) Thomas Lang (Ground Jury Member)
- (France) Isabelle Judet (Ground Jury Member)
- (Denmark) Susanne Baarup (Ground Jury Member)
- (Belgium) Jacques van Daele (FEI Technical Delegate)

Ground jury panel for the U25:

- (Germany) Evi Eisenhardt (Ground Jury President)
- (Denmark) Hans-Christian Matthiesen (Ground Jury Member)
- (Russia) Irina Maknami (Ground Jury Member)
- (United Kingdom) Clive Halsall (Ground Jury Member)
- (Netherlands) Francis Verbeek (Ground Jury Member)

== Medalists ==
=== Dressage seniors ===
Event	Gold	Silver	Bronze
Freestyle dressage Details	Jessica von Bredow-Werndl on Dalera BB TSF; Germany	Cathrine Dufour on Bohemian; Denmark	Charlotte Dujardin on Gio; Great Britain
Special dressage Details	Jessica von Bredow-Werndl on Dalera BB TSF; Germany	Isabell Werth on Weihegold OLD; Germany	Cathrine Dufour on Bohemian; Denmark
Team	Germany; Jessica von Bredow-Werndl on TSF Dalera BB; Dorothee Schneider on Faustus; Helen Langehanenberg on Annabelle; Isabell Werth on Weihegold OLD	(United Kingdom) Great Britain; Charlotte Dujardin on Gio; Charlotte Fry on Everdale; Carl Hester on En Vogue; Gareth Hughes on Sintano van Olympia Hof	Denmark; Cathrine Dufour on Bohemian; Daniel Bachmann Andersen on Marshall-Bell; Nanna Skodborg Merrald on Orthilia; Charlotte Heering on Bufranco

=== Dressage Grand Prix Under 25 ===
Event	Gold	Silver	Bronze
Grand Prix 16-25 dressage	Raphael Netz on Elastico; Germany	Semmieke Rothenberger on Flanell; Germany	Jessica Poelman on Chocolate Cookie RDP; Netherlands
Freestyle 16-25 dressage	Semmieke Rothenberger on Flanell; Germany	Raphael Netz on Elastico; Germany	Jessica Poelman on Chocolate Cookie RDP; Netherlands
Team	Germany; Raphael Netz on Elastico; Semmieke Rothenberger on Flanell; Ann-Kathrin Lindner on FBW Sunfire; Ellen Richter on Vinay NRW	Netherlands; Jessica Poelman on Chocolate Cookie RDP; Febe van Zwambagt on Edson; Jasmien de Koeyer on Esperanza; Devenda Dijkstra on Hero	Sweden; Lina Dolk on Languedoc; Jennifer Lindvall on Midt West Casino; Elin Mattsson on Beckham; Nathalie Wahlund on Cerano Gold

== Medal summary ==
=== Medal table ===
* Host nation (Germany)

Rank	Nation	Gold	Silver	Bronze	Total
1	Germany*	6	3	0	9
2	Denmark	0	1	2	3
2	Netherlands	0	1	2	3
4	Great Britain	0	1	1	2
5	Sweden	0	0	1	1
Totals (5 entries)		6	6	6	18
