= Andrius Petrovas =

Lithuanian equestrian (born 1972)

Personal information
- Nationality: Lithuanian
- Born: 22 November 1972 (age 53) Vilnius, Lithuanian SSR, Soviet Union

Sport
- Sport: Equestrian

Andrius Petrovas (born 22 November 1972 in Vilnius, Lithuania) is a Lithuanian equestrian. Petrovas competed at the 2022 FEI World Championships, at the 2022 FEI World Cup Finals and at the 2023 FEI World Cup Finals. He has been selected by the Lithuanian Equestrian Federation to represent Lithuania as individual at the 2024 Summer Olympics in Paris, which will be his first Olympic appearance.
