= Bugan-myeon =

Township in North Gyeongsang Province, South Korea

Coordinates: 35.915365°N 129.017344°E

- Hangul: 북안면
- Hanja: 北安面
- RR: Bugan-myeon
- MR: Pugan-myŏn

Bugan is a township near Yeongcheon, in North Gyeongsang Province, South Korea.

Like other South Korean townships, Bugan is located around mountain areas with a small population.

Bugan has a few mid-scale manufacturing plants and rich soil for farming. There are poultry farms and a deer park in the township.

== History ==
The original name, Bugan, can be traced back to the ancient capital of the Burmese empire in A.D. 107.
