= Nanna Merrald Rasmussen =

Danish dressage rider (born 1993)

Nanna Merrald
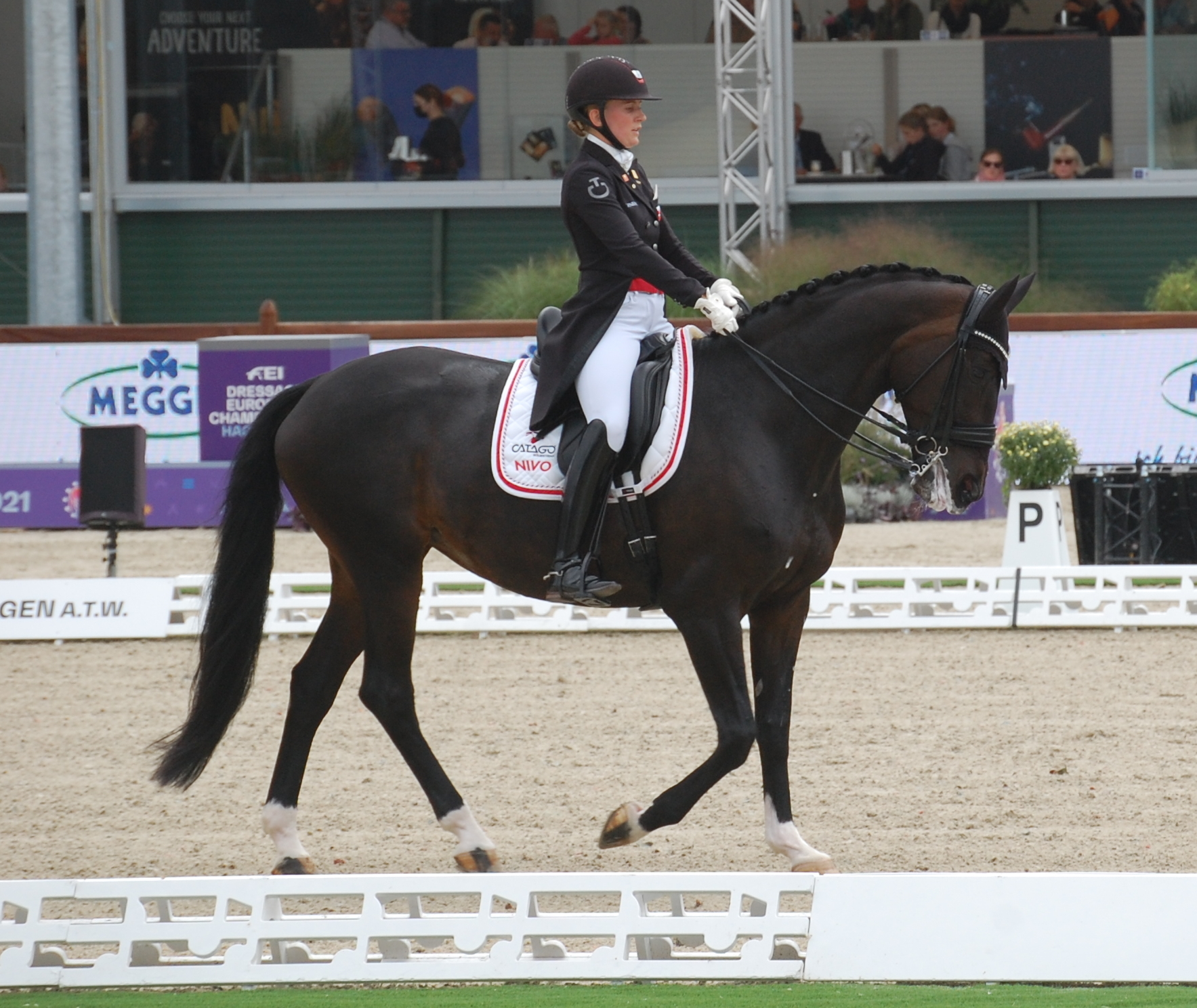
- Merrald riding Atterupgaards Orthilia in 2021

Personal information
- Full name: Nanna Skodborg Merrald
- Born: 8 October 1993 (age 32) Hvalsø, Denmark
- Spouse: Jesper Rasmussen (m. 2022)
- Website: www.nannamerrald.dk

Sport
- Country: Denmark
- Sport: Equestrian
- Club: Merrald Dressage, Hvalsø

Achievements and titles
- Olympic finals: 2020 Olympic Games
Medal record
Equestrian
Representing Denmark
Olympic Games
Silver medal – second place	2024 Paris	Team dressage
World Championships
Gold medal – first place	2022 Herning	Team dressage
European Championships
Bronze medal – third place	2021 Hagen	Team dressage
Bronze medal – third place	2023 Riesenbeck	Team dressage
Silver medal – second place	2023 Riesenbeck	Individual dressage
World Cup
Silver medal – second place	2023 Omaha	Individual dressage
Silver medal – second place	2024 Riyadh	Individual dressage

Nanna Skodborg Merrald (born 8 October 1993) is a Danish dressage rider. She has qualified for the 2014 Dressage World Cup Final in Lyon after finishing 6th in the Western European League rankings. She was forced to withdraw, though, after her horse Millibar failed to pass the veterinary test.

== Career ==
Merrald represented Denmark at the Olympic Games in Tokyo, Japan with the stallion Blue Hors Zack. She finished 4th with the team and 11th in the individual final. She won a team gold medal at the 2022 World Championships.

She also represented Denmark in the 2024 Olympic Games in Paris, where she was riding on the horse Zepter. She won a silver team medal and placed 9th in the individual freestyle.

== Personal life ==
Merrald was married to Jesper Rasmussen on 11 June 2022.
