= Daniel Bachmann Andersen =

Danish equestrian (born 1990)

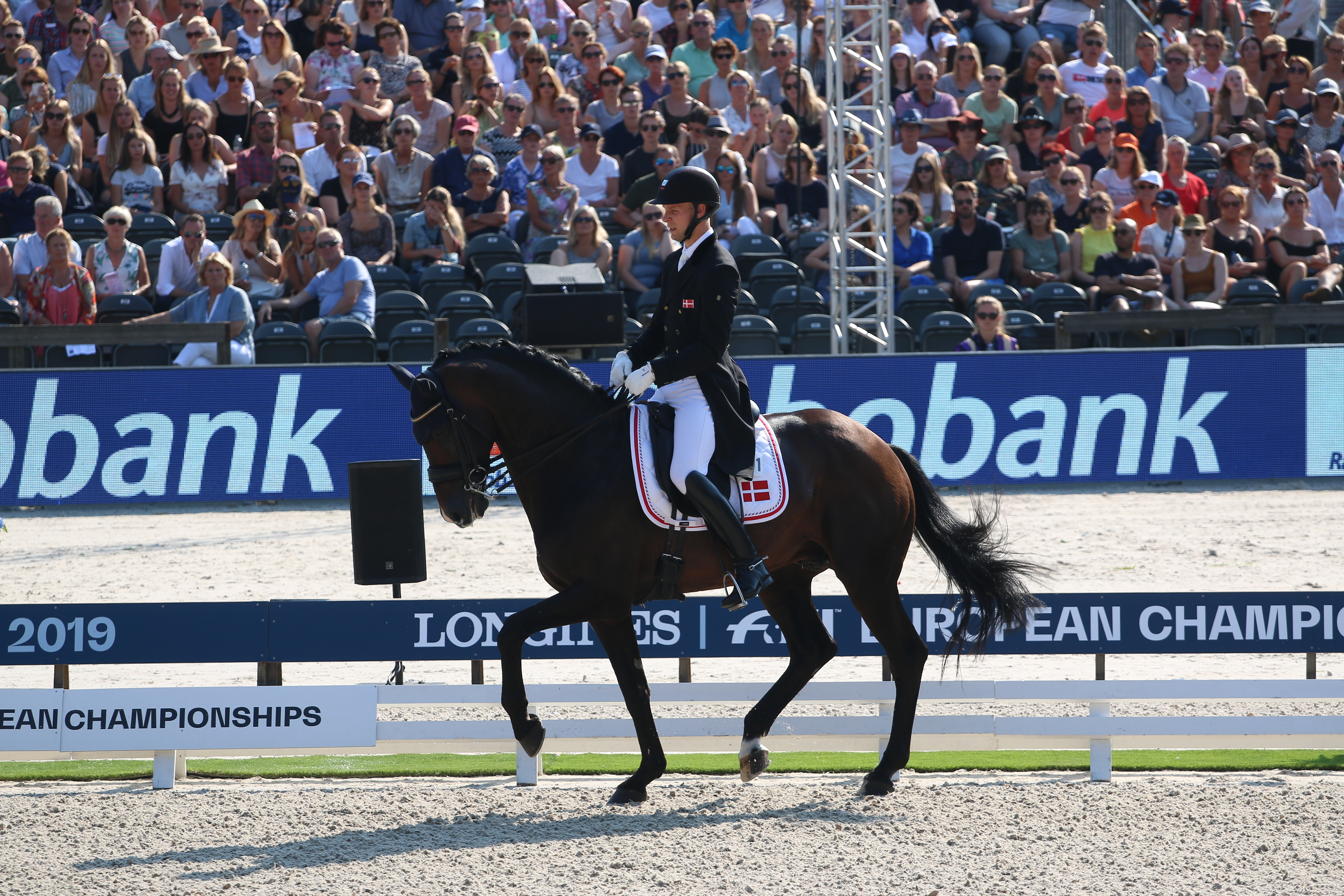
- Andersen in 2019

Personal information
- Full name: Daniel Bachmann Andersen
- Born: Jun 1, 1990 (age 36) Sønderborg, Denmark

Sport
- Country: Denmark
- Sport: Equestrian
- Coached by: Nathalie Zu-Sayn Wittgenstein

Achievements and titles
- World finals: 2018 FEI World Equestrian Games
Medal record
Equestrian
Representing Denmark
Olympic Games
Silver medal – second place	2024 Paris	Team dressage
World Championships
Gold medal – first place	2022 Herning	Team dressage
Bronze medal – third place	2026 Aachen	Team dressage
European Championships
Bronze medal – third place	2021 Hagen	Team dressage
Bronze medal – third place	2023 Riesenbeck	Team dressage

Daniel Bachmann Andersen (born 1 June 1990) is a Danish Olympic equestrian athlete. He competed at the World Equestrian Games in Tryon 2018 and at the European Dressage Championships in 2015 and 2019. He represented the Danish team at the 2024 Olympic Games in Paris, winning a silver medal in the team competition and placed 7th in the individual freestyle.

== Biography ==
Andersen started riding at an age of 10 and became involved in dressage after he met Morten Thomsen, a Danish Olympian, who is from the same village as Daniel. Later he trained horses in Germany. After his riding career in Germany, he started working for Andreas Helgstrand. In 2014 he started for Blue Hors where he became successful with horses such as Zack, Don Olymbrio, Zepter, Loxana and Hotline. He became Danish national champion in 2019, fourth during the World Cup Finals in Göteborg and seventh in the individual freestyle during the European Championships in Rotterdam that same year. He was also 10th in the World Ranking with Zack. In 2020 he decided to go independent and to leave Blue Hors stud.

Andersen won a team gold medal at the 2022 World Championships, which were held in Herning, Denmark.

== Personal life ==
Andersen lives together with his Norwegian wife, Tiril, and their two children.

== Dressage results ==
=== Olympic Games ===
Event	Team	Individual	Horse
(France) 2024 Paris	2nd place, silver medalist(s)	7th	Vayron

=== World Championships ===
Event	Team	Individual	Freestyle	Horse
(United States) 2018 Tryon	10th	17th	—	Blue Hors Zack
(Denmark) 2022 Herning	1st place, gold medalist(s)	8th	8th	Marshall-Bell

=== European Championships ===
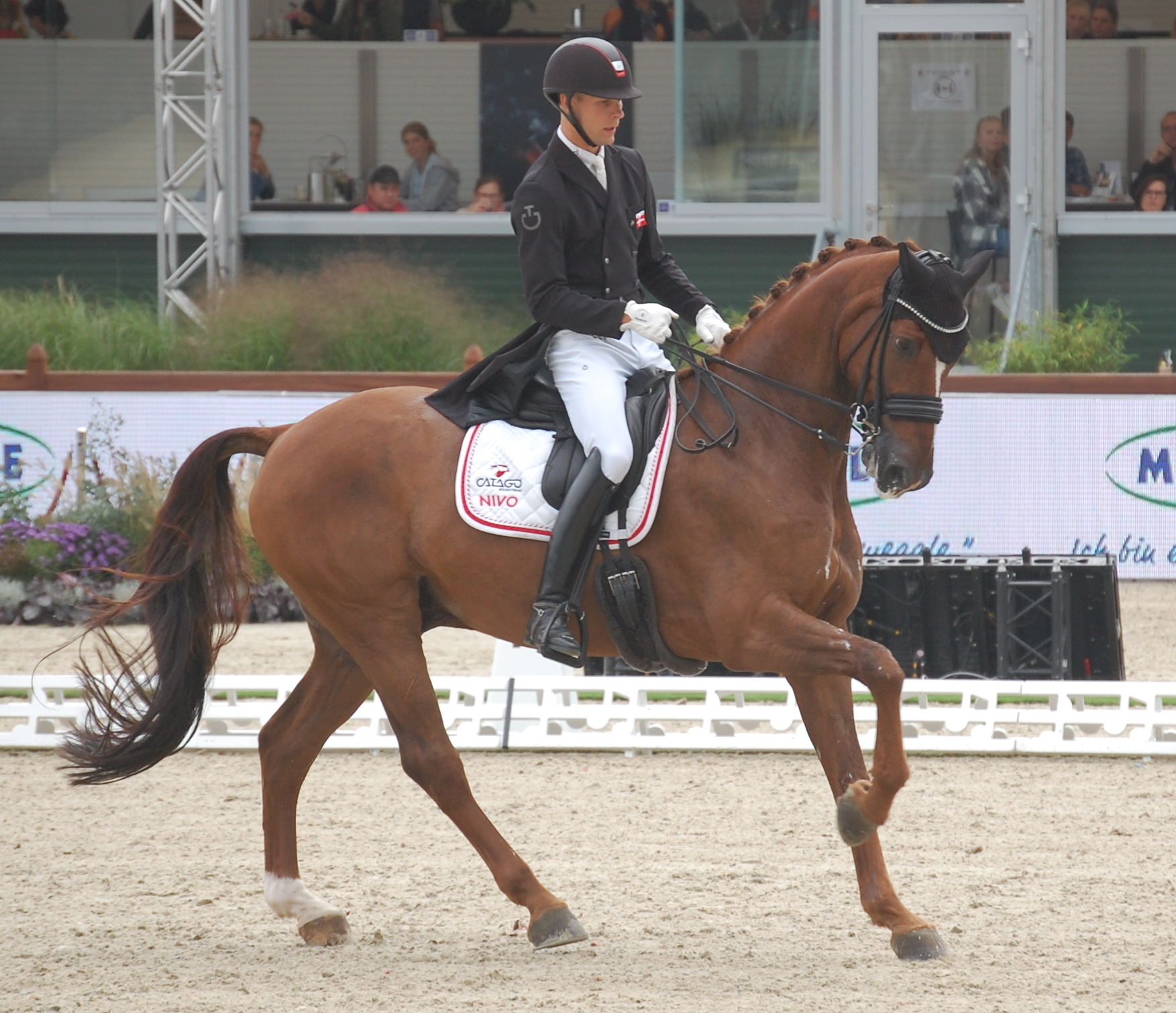
Daniel Bachmann Andersen and Marshall-Bell at 2021 European Championships

Event	Team	Individual	Freestyle	Horse
(Germany) 2015 Aachen	8th	39th	—	Blue Hors Loxana
(Netherlands) 2019 Rotterdam	5th	10th	7th	Blue Hors Zack
(Germany) 2021 Hagen	3rd place, bronze medalist(s)	10th	7th	Marshall-Bell
(Germany) 2023 Riesenbeck	3rd place, bronze medalist(s)	11th	17th	Vayron

=== World Cup ===
==== Final ====
Event	Score	Rank	Horse
(France) 2018 Paris	80.532%	7th	Blue Hors Zack
(Sweden) 2019 Gothenburg	85.468%	4th	Blue Hors Zack
