= Lisa Carlsen (equestrian) =

Canadian equestrian (born 1965)

Personal information
- Born: 17 February 1965 (age 61) Toronto, Ontario, Canada

Sport
- Sport: Equestrian
Medal record
Equestrian
Representing Canada
Pan American Games
Gold medal – first place	1987 Indianapolis	Team jumping

Lisa Carlsen (born 17 February 1965) is a Canadian equestrian. She competed in two events at the 1988 Summer Olympics, with her final standing as ranked 4 in the team results.
