= Gareth Hughes (equestrian) =

British equestrian (born 1971)

Personal information
- Born: 1 April 1971 (age 55)
Medal record
Equestrian
Representing Great Britain
World Championships
Silver medal – second place	2014 Normandy	Team dressage
Silver medal – second place	2022 Herning	Team dressage
European Championships
Gold medal – first place	2023 Riesenbeck	Team dressage
Silver medal – second place	2021 Hagen	Team dressage
Bronze medal – third place	2013 Herning	Team dressage

Gareth Hughes (born 1 April 1971) is a British dressage rider. Representing Great Britain, he competed at the 2014 World Equestrian Gamesat the 2013 European Dressage Championship and at the 2019 European Dressage Championship.

Altogether, Hughes has won three medals at various championships (two silver and one bronze). Meanwhile, his best individual championship result is 15th place from the 2021 European Championships.
