= Michael Bugan =

Slovak equestrian

Personal information
- Born: 28 June 1987 (age 39) Bratislava, Czechoslovakia

Sport
- Country: Slovakia
- Sport: Equestrian
- Coached by: Peter Holler

Michael Bugan (born 28 June 1987) is a Slovak equestrian athlete. He competed at the European Dressage Championships in 2019 in Rotterdam, as first Slovakian dressage rider. In 2017 he competed with two horses at the World Breeding Championships for Young Horses in Ermelo.

Bugan was qualified to participate at the Olympic Games in Tokyo, Japan, but the horse was not registered according the official Olympic rules, whereby the owner of the horse should be the same as the riders nationality.
