= 2023 FEI European Dressage Championships =

Sports season

- Host city: Riesenbeck, Germany
- Date(s): 4–10 September 2023
- Level: Senior
- Events: 18

The 2023 FEI European Dressage Championships will be held in Riesenbeck, Germany, from 4 to 10 September 2023. Other cities who bid to host the Championships were Cascais in Portugal and Vejer de la Frontera in Spain, but both cities withdrew. The FEI allocated the European Championships in Riesenbeck on the 21st of October and will count as qualification event for the Olympic Games. In 2021 the European Championships for show-jumping was also organized in Riesenbeck, at the show location of Olympic gold-medalist Ludger Beerbaum.

== Ground Jury ==
The Ground Jury during the 2023 European Dressage Championships is nominated as follows;

Ground jury panel for the Para-Dressage:

- (Germany) Ulrike Nivelle (Ground Jury President)
- (Denmark) Kurt Christensen (Ground Jury Member)
- (United States) Michael Osinski (Ground Jury Member)
- (Netherlands) Eduard de Wolff van Westerrode (Ground Jury Member)
- (Finland) Maria Colliander (Ground Jury Member)
- (United Kingdom) Isobel Wessels (Ground Jury Member)
- (France) Raphael Saleh (Ground Jury Member)
- (Portugal) Carlos Lopes (Technical Delegate)

Ground jury panel for the Para-Dressage:

- (Germany) Elke Ebert (Ground Jury President)
- (Netherlands) Ineke Jansen (Ground Jury Member)
- (United Kingdom) Sarah Leitch (Ground Jury Member)
- (Sweden) Eva Andersson (Ground Jury Member)
- (France) Anne Prain (Ground Jury Member)
- (United Kingdom) Juliet Whatley (Technical Delegate)

== Medalists ==
=== Medal table ===
* Host nation (Germany)

Rank	Nation	Gold	Silver	Bronze	Total
1	Germany*	4	3	3	10
2	Netherlands	3	4	1	8
3	Denmark	2	1	1	4
4	Belgium	2	0	2	4
5	Great Britain	1	3	5	9
6	Italy	1	0	0	1
6	Latvia	1	0	0	1
8	France	0	2	0	2
9	Ireland	0	1	0	1
10	Norway	0	0	2	2
Totals (10 entries)		14	14	14	42

=== Dressage ===
Event	Gold	Silver	Bronze
Freestyle dressage Details	Jessica von Bredow-Werndl on TSF Dalera BB; Germany	Charlotte Fry on Glamourdale; Great Britain	Charlotte Dujardin on Imhotep; Great Britain
Special dressage Details	Jessica von Bredow-Werndl on TSF Dalera BB; Germany	Nanna Skodborg Merrald on Blue Hors Zepter; Denmark	Charlotte Dujardin on Imhotep; Great Britain
Team	(United Kingdom) Great Britain; Gareth Hughes on Classic Briolinca; Carl Hester on Fame; Charlotte Dujardin on Imhotep; Charlotte Fry on Glamourdale	Germany; Matthias Alexander Rath on Thiago GS; Isabell Werth on DSP Quantaz; Frederic Wandres on Bluetooth OLD; Jessica von Bredow-Werndl on TSF Dalera BB	Denmark; Daniel Bachmann Andersen on Vayron; Andreas Helgstrand on Jovian; Carina Cassøe Krüth on Heiline's Danciera; Nanna Skodborg Merrald on Blue Hors Zepter

=== Para-Dressage ===
Event	Gold	Silver	Bronze
Individual test grade I	Rihards Snikus on King Of The Dance; Latvia	Martina Benzinger on Nautika; Germany	Gabby Blake on HStrong Beau; Great Britain
Individual test grade II	Heidemarie Dresing on Horse24 Dooloop; Germany	Georgia Wilson on Sakura; Great Britain	Ann Cathrin Lübbe on La Costa Majlund; Norway
Individual test grade III	Tobias Jørgensen on Jolene Hill; Denmark	Chiara Zenati on Swing Royal IFCE; France	Melanie Wienand on Lemony's Loverboy; Germany
Individual test grade IV	Demi Haerkens on EHL Daula N.O.P. Netherlands	Sanne Voets on Demantur RS2 N.O.P. Netherlands	Manon Claeys on Katharina Sollenburg; Belgium
Individual test grade V	Michele George on Best of 8 Belgium	Frank Hosmar on Alphaville; Netherlands	Regine Mispelkamp on Highlander's Delight; Germany
Individual test grade I	Sara Morganti on Mariebelle; Italy	Michael Murphy on Cleverboy; Ireland	Martina Benzinger on Nautika; Germany
Individual test grade II	Heidemarie Dresing on Horse24 Dooloop; Germany	Georgia Wilson on Sakura; Great Britain	Ann Cathrin Lübbe on La Costa Majlund; Norway
Individual test grade III	Tobias Jørgensen on Jolene Hill; Denmark	Chiara Zenati on Swing Royal IFCE; France	Lotte Krijnsen on Rosenstolz; Netherlands
Individual test grade IV	Demi Haerkens on EHL Daula N.O.P. Netherlands	Sanne Voets on Demantur RS2 N.O.P. Netherlands	Manon Claeys on Katharina Sollenburg; Belgium
Individual test grade V	Michèle George on Best Of 8 Belgium	Frank Hosmar on Alphaville N.O.P. Netherlands	Sophie Wells on LJT Egebjerggards Samoa; Great Britain
Team para-dressage	Netherlands; Lotte Krijnsen on Rosenstolz N.O.P. Demi Haerkens on EHL Daula N.O.P. Sanne Voets on Demantur RS2 N.O.P. Frank Hosmar on Alphaville N.O.P.	Germany; Melanie Wienand on Lemony's Loverboy; Heidemarie Dresing on Horse24 Dooloop; Martina Benzinger on Nautika; Regine Mispelkamp on Highlander Delight's	(United Kingdom) Great Britain; Georgia Wilson on Sakura; Gabby Blake on Strong Beau; Charlotte Cundall on FJ Veyron; Sophie Wells on LJT Egebjerggards Samoa
