= Charlotte Dujardin =

British equestrian and writer (born 1985)

Charlotte Dujardin CBE
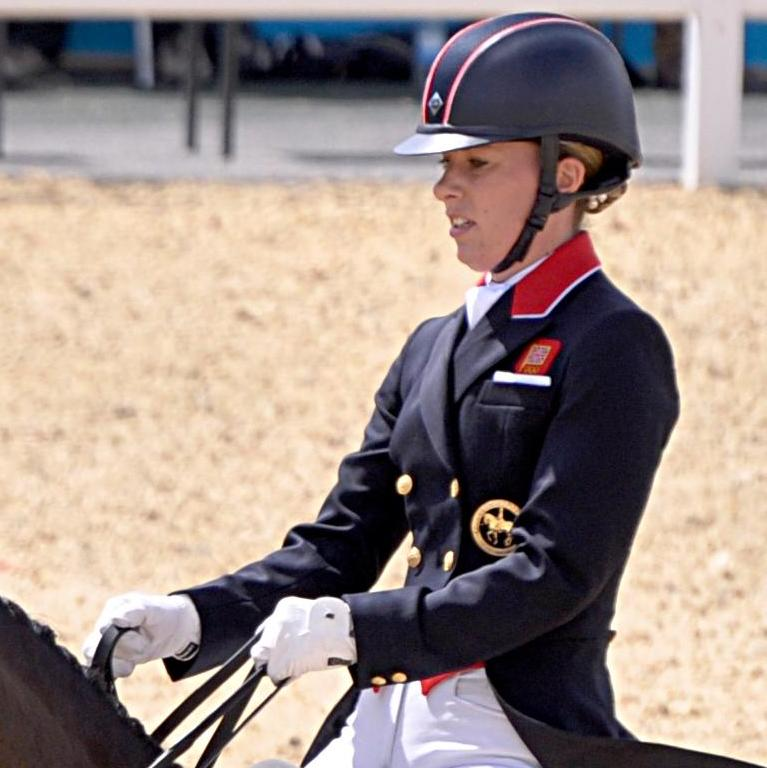
- Dujardin in 2012

Personal information
- Full name: Charlotte Susan Jane Dujardin
- Born: 13 July 1985 (age 41) Enfield, Greater London, England
- Height: 1.70 m (5 ft 7 in)
- Weight: 61 kg (134 lb)
- Children: 2

Sport
- Country: Great Britain
- Sport: Equestrian dressage
- Team: British Dressage Federation
- Turned pro: 2011
- Coached by: Carl Hester, Ian Cast

Achievements and titles
- Highest world ranking: 1
Medal record
Equestrian
Representing Great Britain
Olympic Games
| Gold medal – first place | 2012 London | Team dressage (with Valegro) |
| Gold medal – first place | 2012 London | Individual dressage (with Valegro) |
| Gold medal – first place | 2016 Rio de Janeiro | Individual dressage (with Valegro) |
| Silver medal – second place | 2016 Rio de Janeiro | Team dressage (with Valegro) |
| Bronze medal – third place | 2020 Tokyo | Team dressage (with Gio) |
| Bronze medal – third place | 2020 Tokyo | Individual dressage (with Gio) |
World Equestrian Games
| Gold medal – first place | 2014 Normandy | Spécial dressage (with Valegro) |
| Gold medal – first place | 2014 Normandy | Freestyle dressage (with Valegro) |
| Silver medal – second place | 2014 Normandy | Team dressage (with Valegro) |
| Silver medal – second place | 2022 Herning | Team dressage |
| Bronze medal – third place | 2018 Tryon | Spécial dressage (with Mount St John Freestyle) |
| Bronze medal – third place | 2018 Tryon | Team dressage (with Mount St John Freestyle) |
European Dressage Championships
| Gold medal – first place | 2011 Rotterdam | Team dressage (with Valegro) |
| Gold medal – first place | 2013 Herning | Spécial dressage (with Valegro) |
| Gold medal – first place | 2013 Herning | Freestyle dressage (with Valegro) |
| Gold medal – first place | 2015 Aachen | Spécial dressage (with Valegro) |
| Gold medal – first place | 2015 Aachen | Freestyle dressage (with Valegro) |
| Gold medal – first place | 2023 Riesenbeck | Team dressage (with Imhotep) |
| Silver medal – second place | 2015 Aachen | Team dressage (with Valegro) |
| Silver medal – second place | 2021 Hagen | Team dressage (with Gio) |
| Bronze medal – third place | 2013 Herning | Team dressage (with Valegro) |
| Bronze medal – third place | 2021 Hagen | Individual dressage (with Gio) |
| Bronze medal – third place | 2023 Riesenbeck | Special dressage (with Imhotep) |
| Bronze medal – third place | 2023 Riesenbeck | Freestyle dressage (with Imhotep) |
Dressage World Cup
| Gold medal – first place | 2014 Lyon | Individual dressage (with Valegro) |
| Gold medal – first place | 2015 Las Vegas | Individual dressage (with Valegro) |

Charlotte Susan Jane Dujardin (born 13 July 1985) is a British dressage rider, equestrian, and writer. A multiple World and Olympic champion, Dujardin has been described as the dominant dressage rider of her era. In 2014 she held the complete set of available individual elite dressage titles: the individual Olympic freestyle, World freestyle and Grand Prix Special, World Cup individual dressage and European freestyle, and Grand Prix Special titles. Dujardin was the first rider to hold this complete set of titles at the same time.

Her six Olympic medals are a joint record for a female British Olympian; cyclist Laura Kenny has won more golds.

On 23 July 2024, Dujardin pulled out of the 2024 Summer Olympics after a video surfaced of her excessively whipping a horse during training. She was provisionally handed a one-year suspension, which was upheld by the International Federation for Equestrian Sports in December 2024.

== Early life ==
Born in Enfield, Dujardin was brought up in Leighton Buzzard, Bedfordshire. She started riding as a two-year-old, returning her elder sisters' horses from the show jumping ring to the horse trailer. Aged three, she achieved second place at her first Pony Club show jumping competition. To finance their hobby, their mother Jane Dujardin bought and sold ponies for her daughters.

As a child Dujardin was diagnosed with dyslexia. She attended Vandyke Upper School in Leighton Buzzard, but later commented, "I didn’t really attend school that much". She left school aged 16.

Dujardin won the Horse of the Year Show competition four times and was a winner at All England Jumping Course at Hickstead on three occasions.

== Career ==
After encouragement from her trainer Debbie Thomas, Dujardin took up dressage with a horse bought using an inheritance from her grandmother. In February 2007, after she sought employment with Carl Hester, he gave her some coaching. Spotting her talent, he offered her a job as a groom at his yard in Newent, Gloucestershire, where she has since remained. Dujardin's owned-horse is Fernandez.

In 2011, Dujardin was asked by Hester and co-owner Roly Luard to develop Valegro, a novice Dutch Warmblood gelding, with the intention of that horse being ridden by Hester. However, Dujardin competed on Valegro in their first dressage Grand Prix event in 2011 and the combination became part of the successful team which won gold in a European Dressage Championship event at Rotterdam. The pair then won the FEI World Cup Grand Prix at London Olympia in 2011, setting a new World Record for the Olympic Grand Prix discipline by point-scoring at 88.022%, in April 2012.

In December 2012 Dujardin, again riding Valegro, won the 2012 World Cup freestyle event held at Olympia, with a score of 87.875%. On 19 April 2015 in Las Vegas, Dujardin and Valegro won the FEI World Cup with a score of 94.169% on the final day of competition. This was their fourth consecutive World Title; they are the only competition pair to have ever held four consecutive world titles.

In 2019, Dujardin was eliminated from the Longines FEI European Championships after blood was found on her horse, Mount St John Freestyle, after her test.

=== Olympics ===
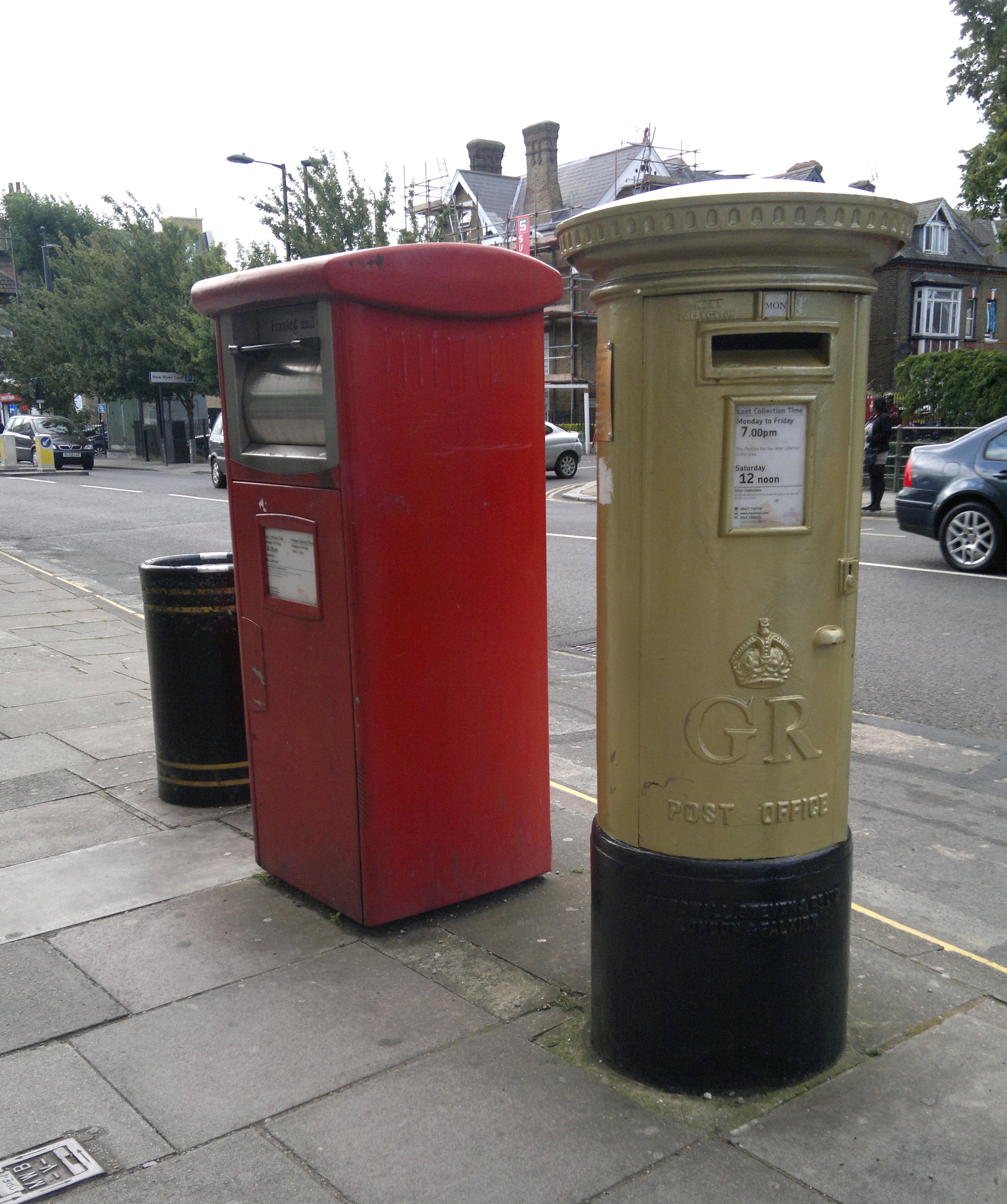
The gold post box for Charlotte Dujardin in Enfield.

Dujardin and Valegro were among the rider/horse pairs selected to represent Great Britain at the 2012 Summer Olympics, In the first round this dressage team set a new Olympic Record of 83.784%. On 7 August 2012 the pair were members of the British team which won the gold medal in the team dressage event. Two days later, in a routine accompanied by music which included Land of Hope and Glory, The Great Escape and the chimes of Big Ben; the pair won the gold medal in the individual dressage event, with a score of 90.089%.

Dujardin and Valegro also won double individual gold medals at the 2016 Rio Olympics, making her the first British woman to retain an individual Olympic title. With three gold medals and a silver, Dujardin was briefly the most successful female British Olympian in the history of the Games before cyclist Laura Trott surpassed her record with a fourth gold. Dujardin and Valegro set a new Olympic dressage score of 93.857 in the Grand Prix Freestyle.

On 14 December 2016, Dujardin retired Valegro at the age of 14 after completing a freestyle test at the Olympia London International Horse Show. The event was televised live on the BBC. Valegro's final performance was followed by tributes from Carl Hester, Valegro's owner and Dujardin's trainer, and Alan Davies, Valegro's groom. Dujardin and Hester decided after the 2016 Summer Olympics that Valegro had done everything that he could have after winning three Olympic gold medals (two individual and one team), one silver, and numerous world titles with Dujardin, and wanted to let him end his career on a high note. "I wanted to retire him on a high note, because he owes me absolutely nothing", Dujardin said after an interview with the BBC.

Dujardin was removed from the 2024 Summer Olympics in Paris after a video emerged of her repeatedly whipping a horse during training. The day after her suspension was announced, Dujardin's UK Sport funding was halted pending the outcome of the FEI investigation. She was also dropped as an ambassador for horse welfare charity Brooke and two of her sponsors terminated their deals with her. In December 2024, the FEI upheld the one-year suspension and fine of 10,000 Swiss Francs (£8,881).

== International Championship results ==
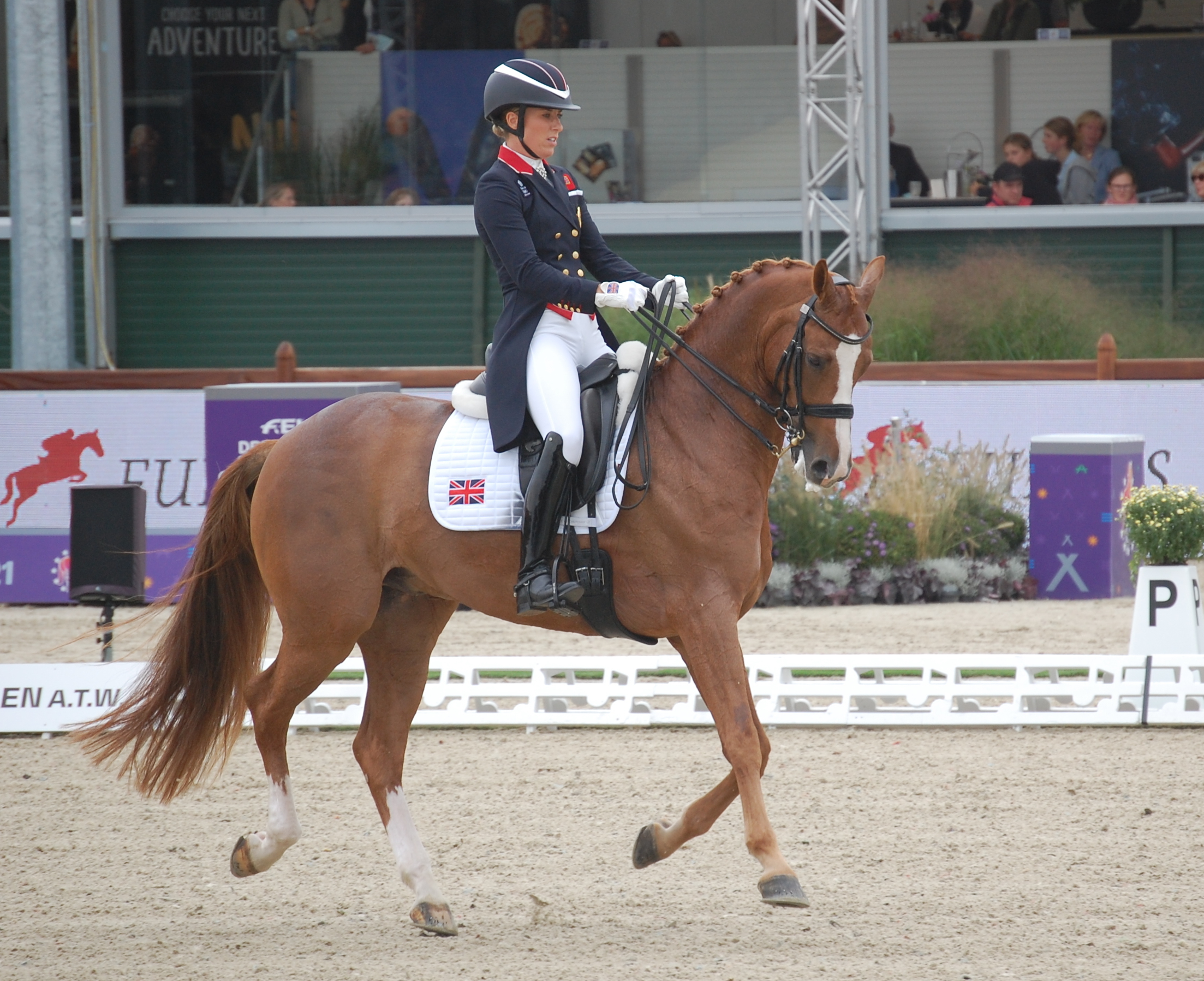
Charlotte Dujardin and Gio at 2021 European Championships.

Results
| Year | Event | Horse | Score | Placing | Notes |
|---|---|---|---|---|---|
| 2011 | European Championships | Valegro | 78.830% | 1st place, gold medalist(s) | Team |
| 2011 | European Championships | Valegro | 76.548% | 6th | Individual Special |
| 2011 | European Championships | Valegro | 79.357% | 9th | Individual Freestyle |
| 2012 | Olympic Games | Valegro | 83.663% | 1st place, gold medalist(s) | Team |
| 2012 | Olympic Games | Valegro | 90.089% | 1st place, gold medalist(s) | Individual |
| 2013 | European Championships | Valegro | 85.942% | 3rd place, bronze medalist(s) | Team |
| 2013 | European Championships | Valegro | 85.699% | 1st place, gold medalist(s) | Individual Special |
| 2013 | European Championships | Valegro | 91.250% | 1st place, gold medalist(s) | Individual Freestyle |
| 2014 | World Cup Final | Valegro | 92.179% | 1st place, gold medalist(s) | |
| 2014 | World Equestrian Games | Valegro | 85.271% | 2nd place, silver medalist(s) | Team |
| 2014 | World Equestrian Games | Valegro | 86.120% | 1st place, gold medalist(s) | Individual Special |
| 2014 | World Equestrian Games | Valegro | 92.161% | 1st place, gold medalist(s) | Individual Freestyle |
| 2015 | World Cup Final | Valegro | 94.196% | 1st place, gold medalist(s) | |
| 2015 | European Championships | Valegro | 83.029% | 2nd place, silver medalist(s) | Team |
| 2015 | European Championships | Valegro | 87.577% | 1st place, gold medalist(s) | Individual Special |
| 2015 | European Championships | Valegro | 89.054% | 1st place, gold medalist(s) | Individual Freestyle |
| 2016 | Olympic Games | Valegro | 85.071% | 2nd place, silver medalist(s) | Team |
| 2016 | Olympic Games | Valegro | 93.857% | 1st place, gold medalist(s) | Individual |
| 2018 | World Equestrian Games | Mount St. John Freestyle | 77.764% | 3rd place, bronze medalist(s) | Team |
| 2018 | World Equestrian Games | Mount St. John Freestyle | 81.489% | 3rd place, bronze medalist(s) | Individual Special |
| 2019 | European Championships | Mount St. John Freestyle | EL | 4th | Team |
| 2019 | European Championships | Mount St. John Freestyle | EL | 66th | Individual |
| 2021 | Olympic Games | Gio | 79.544% | 3rd place, bronze medalist(s) | Team |
| 2021 | Olympic Games | Gio | 88.543% | 3rd place, bronze medalist(s) | Individual |
| 2021 | European Championships | Gio | 79.829% | 2nd place, silver medalist(s) | Team |
| 2021 | European Championships | Gio | 87.246% | 3rd place, bronze medalist(s) | Individual Freestyle |
| 2022 | World Equestrian Games | Imhotep | | 2nd place, silver medalist(s) | Team |
| 2022 | World Equestrian Games | Imhotep | | 6th | Individual Special |
| 2022 | World Equestrian Games | Imhotep | | 10th | Individual Freestyle |
| 2023 | European Championships | Imhotep | | 1st place, gold medalist(s) | Team |
| 2023 | European Championships | Imhotep | | 3rd place, bronze medalist(s) | Individual Special |
| 2023 | European Championships | Imhotep | | 3rd place, bronze medalist(s) | Individual Freestyle |

== Writing and television ==
Dujardin released her autobiography, The Girl on the Dancing Horse: Charlotte Dujardin and Valegro, in 2018. She guest-starred on the Netflix show Free Rein.

== Personal life ==
Her fiancé Dean Golding wore a shirt bearing the proposal "Can we get married now?" after she won the gold medal at the Rio Olympics. On 6 March 2023, Dujardin gave birth to a daughter. Her second child was born in 2025.

== Honours ==
Dujardin was appointed Officer of the Order of the British Empire (OBE) in the 2013 New Year Honours and Commander of the Order of the British Empire (CBE) in the 2017 New Year Honours, both for services to equestrianism.

Dujardin has a modern strip of public housing, Dujardin Mews, named after her in Enfield.

== See also ==
- 2012 Summer Olympics and Paralympics gold post boxes
