= Individual dressage at the 2019 European Dressage Championships =

The individual dressage at the 2019 FEI European Championships in Rotterdam, Netherlands was held at Kralingse Bos from 19 to 25 August.

Germany's Isabell Werth won the gold medal in both Grand Prix Special and Grand Prix Freestyle, repeating her success from 2017 European Dressage Championship held in Gothenburg, Sweden. Dorothee Schneider representing Germany won a silver medal in both Grand Prix Freestyle and Grand Prix Special. Cathrine Dufour of Denmark won a bronze in special, while Germany's Jessica von Bredow-Werndl won a bronze in freestyle, her first individual medal at a major championship.

== Competition format ==
The team and individual dressage competitions used the same results. Dressage had three phases. The first phase was the Grand Prix. Top 30 individuals advanced to the second phase, the Grand Prix Special where the first individual medals were awarded. The last set of medals at the 2019 European Dressage Championships was awarded after the third phase, the Grand Prix Freestyle where top 15 combinations competed.

== Officials ==
The following judges officiate during the European Dressage Championships:

- (Netherlands) Mariëtte Sanders- van Gansewinkel (Ground Jury President)
- (Germany) Evi Eisenhardt (Ground Jury Member)
- (United States) Janet Lee Foy (Ground Jury Member)
- (United Kingdom) Clive Halsall (Ground Jury Member)
- (Denmark) Susanne Baarup (Ground Jury Member)
- (France) Isabelle Judet (Ground Jury Member)
- (Russia) Irina Maknami (Ground Jury Member)
- (Germany) Gotthilf Riexinger (Technical Delegate)

== Schedule ==
All times are Central European Summer Time (UTC+2)

Date	Time	Round
Monday, 19 August 2019	09:00	Grand Prix (Day 1)
Tuesday, 20 August 2019	08:00	Grand Prix (Day 2)
Thursday, 22 August 2019	16:00	Grand Prix Special
Saturday, 24 August 2019	15:00	Grand Prix Freestyle

== Results ==
Rider	Nation	Horse	GP score	Rank	GPS score	Rank	GPF score	Rank
Isabell Werth	Germany	Bella Rose	85.652	1 Q	86.520	(gold) Q	90.875	1st place, gold medalist(s)
Dorothee Schneider	Germany	Showtime FRH	80.233	2 Q	85.465	(silver) Q	90.561	2nd place, silver medalist(s)
Sonke Rothenberger	Germany	Cosmo	79.084	3 Q	78.116	6		
Edward Gal	Netherlands	Glock's Zonik	78.758	4 Q	77.994	8 Q	84.271	6
Daniel Bachmann Andersen	Denmark	Blue Hors Zack	78.665	5 Q	77.234	10 Q	83.711	7
Carl Hester	Great Britain	Hawtins Delicato	78.323	6 Q	77.508	9 Q	70.732	14
Patrik Kittel	Sweden	Well Done de la Rouche CMF	78.261	7 Q	77.052	11 Q	82.296	8
Cathrine Dufour	Denmark	Atterupsgaard Cassidy	77.143	8 Q	81.337	(bronze) Q	87.771	4
Jessica von Bredow-Werndl	Germany	Dalera TSF	76.894	9 Q	78.541	4 Q	89.107	3rd place, bronze medalist(s)
Gareth Hughes	Great Britain	Classic Briolinca	76.351	10 Q	78.085	7 Q	80.125	10
Judy Reynolds	Ireland	Vancouver K	76.351	10 Q	78.252	5 Q	85.589	5
Juliette Ramel	Sweden	Buriel K.H.	76.196	12 Q	76.003	12 Q	74.346	13
Emmelie Scholtens	Netherlands	Desperados	76.087	13 Q	65.365	29		
Therese Nilshagen	Sweden	Dante Weltino OLD	75.466	14 Q	75.365	14 Q	78.946	11
Hans-Peter Minderhoud	Netherlands	Glock's Dream Boy	75.295	15 Q	75.517	13 Q	81.546	9
Beatriz Ferrer-Salat	Spain	Delgado	74.363	16 Q	EL	30		
Charlotte Fry	Great Britain	Dark Legend	74.317	17 Q	73.815	17		
Antonia Ramel	Sweden	Brother de Jeu	74.224	18 Q	73.435	19		
Claudio Castilla Ruiz	Spain	Alcaide	73.214	19 Q	74.407	16 Q	77.861	12
Elena Sidneva	Russia	Fuhur 6	72.950	20 Q	72.568	20		
Anders Dahl	Denmark	Fidelio van het Bloemhof	72.733	21 Q	71.869	22		
Henri Ruoste	Finland	Rossetti	72.686	22 Q	75.228	15 Q	67.982	15
Agnete Kirk Thinggaard	Denmark	Jojo AZ	72.671	23 Q	72.508	21		
Maria Caetano	Portugal	Coroado	72.329	24 Q	71.398	23		
Anne Meulendijks	Netherlands	MDH Avanti	71.801	25 Q	73.663	18		
Rodrigo Torres	Portugal	Fagoso	71.786	26 Q	70.957	24		
Morgan Barbancon	France	Sir Donnerhall II OLD	71.599	27 Q	69.468	27		
Birgit Wientzek Pläge	Switzerland	Robinvale	71.584	28 Q	70.684	26		
Laurence Roos	Belgium	Fil Rouge	70.466	29 Q	70.174	25		
Florian Bacher	Austria	Fidertraum	70.171	30 Q	67.644	28		
Estelle Wettstein	Switzerland	West Side Story OLD	70.047	31				
Juan Antonio Jimenez Cobo	Spain	Euclides Mor	69.969	32				
Tatyana Kosterina	Russia	Diavolessa V.	69.720	33				
Borja Carrascosa	Spain	Ein Traum	69.705	34				
Heike Holstein	Ireland	Sambuca	69.427	35				
Arnaud Serre	France	Ultrablue de Massa	69.425	36				
Karoline Valenta	Austria	Diego	69.397	37				
João Miguel Torrao	Portugal	Equador	68.991	38				
Belinda Weinbauer	Austria	Fustanella OLD	68.882	39				
Sascha Schulz	Luxembourg	Dragao	68.773	40				
Stéphanie Brieussel	France	Amorak	68.758	41				
Astrid Neumayer	Austria	Sir Simon	68.727	42				
Eyal Zlatin	Israel	Bonzanjo	68.463	43				
Fanny Verliefden	Belgium	Indoctro v/h Steenblok	68.137	44				
Libuse Mencke	Czech Republic	Syrio 2	67.873	45				
Anna Merveldt	Ireland	Esporim	67.717	46				
Mikaela Fabricius-Bjerre	Finland	Skovlunds Gamin G	67.702	47				
Michael Bugan	Slovakia	For President	67.593	48				
Duarte Nogueira	Portugal	Beirao	67.531	49				
Simon Missiaen	Belgium	Charlie	67.314	50				
Evgenija Davydova	Russia	Awakening	67.283	51				
Terhi Stegars	Finland	Thai Pee	67.158	52				
Charlotte Lenherr	Switzerland	Darko of de Niro ZC CH	66.957	53				
Dina Ellermann	Estonia	Donna Anna	66.661	54				
Kate Dwyer	Ireland	Snowdon Faberge	66.180	55				
Fie Christine Skarsoe	Luxembourg	So Dark	66.102	56				
Carla Aeberhard	Switzerland	Delioh von Buchmatt CH	65.947	57				
Carrie Schopf	Armenia	Saumur	65.450	58				
Joanne Vaughan	Georgia	Elmegardens Marquis	64.907	59				
Micah Deligdish	Israel	Destiny	64.736	60				
Mikaela Soratie	Finland	Dacor	64.457	61				
Anita Schmidt	Hungary	Limitless	63.012	62				
Yulia Vinnitskaja	Russia	Samba Pa Ti	62.516	63				
Oksana Gusarova	Ukraine	Enrico	62.391	64				
Grete Ayache	Estonia	Farao da Raia	60.683	65				
Charlotte Dujardin	Great Britain	Mount st. John Freestyle	EL	66				
Nicolas Wagner	Luxembourg	Quarter Back Junior	EL	66				
Charlotte Chalvignac	France	Lights of Londonderry	EL	66				
Isabel Cool	Belgium	Aranco V	EL	66				
