= Equestrian at the 2020 Summer Olympics – Individual dressage =

Olympic cycling event

Individual dressage at the Games of the XXXII Olympiad
- Olympic equestrian dressage
- Venue: Baji Koen
- Date: 24–28 July 2021
- Competitors: 60 from 30 nations

Medalists
1st place, gold medalist(s)		Jessica von Bredow-Werndl on Dalera	Germany
2nd place, silver medalist(s)		Isabell Werth on Bella Rose	Germany
3rd place, bronze medalist(s)		Charlotte Dujardin on Gio	Great Britain

The individual dressage event at the 2020 Summer Olympics took place from 24 to 28 July 2021 at the Baji Koen. Like all other equestrian events, the dressage competition is open-gender, with both male and female athletes competing in the same division. 60 riders from 30 nations are expected to compete.

== Background ==
This was the 25th appearance of the event, which has been held at every Summer Olympics since 1912.

The two-time reigning Olympic champion is Charlotte Dujardin of Great Britain (riding Valegro). The reigning (2018) World Champion is Isabell Werth of Germany.

An Olympics.com preview of equestrian (all events) provided the following overview:

Germany has won the most gold medals in Olympic equestrian sports (26 to be exact), reflecting the country's equestrian heritage and passion for the sport. Michael Jung has dominated individual eventing at recent Games, winning gold in both London 2012 and Rio 2016. Jung was destined to carve his name into equestrian history: both his father and grandfather were well-known equestrian athletes. Sweden, France, the USA and Great Britain are among the other leading nations in equestrian sport.

== Qualification ==
A National Olympic Committee (NOC) could enter up to 3 qualified riders in the individual dressage. Quota places are allocated to the NOC, which selects the riders. There were 60 quota places available, allocated as follows:

- Team members (45 places): Each of the 15 NOCs qualified in the team dressage event entered its 3 team members in the individual dressage event.
- Ranking (15 places): The top 2 riders (1 per NOC, and excluding NOCs with qualified teams) in each of the 7 geographic regions were to receive a quota places, with one final quota place based on rankings regardless of geographic region. The two Americas regions were combined. A withdrawal by Norway resulted in one of the Group A places being reallocated to the world ranking.

== Competition format ==
The competition format has changed dramatically from prior Games. The competition has dropped from three rounds to two; moreover, advancement is now determined first by place in group rather than overall place (though there are lucky loser places available). The two rounds of the competition are the Grand Prix and the Grand Prix Freestyle.

- Grand Prix: All 60 riders compete in the Grand Prix. They are divided into 6 groups of 10; 3 groups will go on each day of the round. The top 2 riders in each group, along with the next best 6 overall, advance to the Grand Prix Freestyle. The Grand Prix is also the qualifying round for the team event.
- Grand Prix Freestyle: The 18 riders competing receive a final rank based only on the Grand Prix Freestyle score (the Grand Prix scores do not carry over).

== Schedule ==
The event takes place on three competition days over five days, with two days for the Grand Prix followed by a rest day, the team final day, then the individual Grand Prix Freestyle.

All times are Japan Standard Time (UTC+9).

Day	Date	Start	Finish	Phase
Day 1	Saturday 24 July 2021	17:00	22:00	Grand Prix Day 1
Day 2	Sunday 25 July 2021	17:00	22:00	Grand Prix Day 2
Day 5	Wednesday 28 July 2021	17:30	21:25	Grand Prix Freestyle

== Results ==
=== Grand Prix ===
The top two athletes from each group, and the six athletes with the next best scores (a multi-step tiebreaker would be used for ties, finally broken by random draw) will qualify to the individual final (Grand Prix Freestyle).

Rank	Group	Rider	Nation	Horse	GP score	Notes
1	C	Jessica von Bredow-Werndl	Germany	TSF Dalera	84.379	Q
2	F	Isabell Werth	Germany	Bella Rose 2	82.500	Q
3	B	Cathrine Dufour	Denmark	Bohemian	81.056	Q
4	F	Charlotte Dujardin	Great Britain	Gio	80.963	Q
5	E	Dorothee Schneider	Germany	Showtime FRH	78.820	Q
6	B	Edward Gal	Netherlands	Total Us	78.649	Q
7	C	Sabine Schut-Kery	United States	Sanceo	78.416	Q
8	A	Charlotte Fry	Great Britain	Everdale	77.096	Q
9	C	Hans Peter Minderhoud	Netherlands	Dream Boy	76.817	q
10	D	Carina Cassøe Krüth	Denmark	Heiline's Danciera	76.677	Q
11	F	Steffen Peters	United States	Suppenkasper	76.196	q
12	A	Therese Nilshagen	Sweden	Dante Weltino Old	75.140	Q
13	C	Carl Hester	Great Britain	En Vogue	75.124	q
14	D	Adrienne Lyle	United States	Salvino	74.876	WD
15	E	Juliette Ramel	Sweden	Buriel K.H.	73.369	Q
16	A	Nanna Skodborg Merrald	Denmark	Zack	73.168	q
17	C	Rodrigo Torres	Portugal	Fogoso	72.624	q
18	B	Beatriz Ferrer-Salat	Spain	Elegance	72.096	q
19	F	Brittany Fraser-Beaulieu	Canada	All In	71.677	q
20	E	Marlies van Baalen	Netherlands	Go Legend	71.615	
21	D	Christian Schumach	Austria	Te Quiero SF	70.900	
22	A	Yvonne Losos de Muñiz	Dominican Republic	Aquamarijn	70.869	
23	D	Laurence Roos	Belgium	Fil Rouge	70.699	
24	E	Morgan Barbançon	France	Sir Donnerhall II OLD	70.543	
25	E	Nicolas Wagner	Luxembourg	Quarter Back Junior FHR	70.512	
26	A	João Oliva	Brazil	Escorial	70.419	
27	B	Maria Caetano	Portugal	Fenix de Tineo	70.311	
28	E	Domien Michiels	Belgium	Intermezzo Van Het Meerdaalhof	70.202	
29	F	João Miguel Torrao	Portugal	Equador	70.186	
30	F	Florian Bacher	Austria	Fidertraum	69.813	
31	B	Inessa Merkulova	ROC	Mister X	69.457	
32	C	José Antonio García Mena	Spain	Sorento 15	69.146	
33	F	Maxime Collard	France	Cupido PB	69.068	
34	C	Alexandre Ayache	France	Zo What	68.929	
35	B	Antonia Ramel	Sweden	Brother de Jeu	68.540	
36	D	Simone Pearce	Australia	Destano	68.494	
37	D	Heike Holstein	Ireland	Sambuca	68.432	
38	D	Severo Jurado	Spain	Fendi T	68.370	
39	B	Chris von Martels	Canada	Eclips	68.059	
40	A	Mary Hanna	Australia	Calanta	67.981	
41	E	Estelle Wettstein	Switzerland	West Side Story OLD	67.748	
42	C	Larissa Pauluis	Belgium	Flambeau	67.251	
43	B	Francesco Zaza	Italy	Wispering Romance	66.941	
44	F	Yessin Rahmouni	Morocco	All at Once	66.599	
45	F	Hiroyuki Kitahara	Japan	Huracan 10	66.304	
46	F	Virginia Yarur	Chile	Ronaldo	66.227	
47	A	Inna Logutenkova	Ukraine	Fleraro	66.118	
48	E	Shingo Hayashi	Japan	Scolari 4	65.714	
49	B	Dina Ellermann	Estonia	Donna Anna	65.435	
50	D	Lindsay Kellock	Canada	Sebastien	65.404	
51	E	Martha Del Valle	Mexico	Beduino LAM	64.876	
52	C	Henri Ruoste	Finland	Kontestro DB	64.674	
53	C	Aleksandra Maksakova	ROC	Bojengels	63.898	
54	D	Tatyana Kosterina	ROC	Diavolessa VA	63.866	
55	A	Kim Dong-seon	South Korea	Belstaff	63.447	
56	A	Kazuki Sado	Japan	Ludwig Der Sonnenkoenig 2	62.531	
57	E	Kelly Layne	Australia	Samhitas	58.354	
—	D	Caroline Chew	Singapore	Tribiani	EL	
—	B	Victoria Max-Theurer	Austria	Abegglen NRW	WD	

=== Grand Prix Freestyle ===
The Grand Prix Freestyle was drawn in groups of 6 in reverse order of the results in the Grand Prix. For the first time at the Olympics, the FEI Degree Of Difficulty system was used: each of the riders electronically submitted a floorplan of their movements ahead of the competition and were assigned a maximum difficulty score by computer. The judges then assessed the competitors according to their unique scoresheet.

Rank	Rider	Nation	Horse	GPF score	Notes
1st place, gold medalist(s)	Jessica von Bredow-Werndl	Germany	TSF Dalera	91.732	
2nd place, silver medalist(s)	Isabell Werth	Germany	Bella Rose 2	89.657	
3rd place, bronze medalist(s)	Charlotte Dujardin	Great Britain	Gio	88.543	
4	Cathrine Dufour	Denmark	Bohemian	87.507	
5	Sabine Schut-Kery	United States	Sanceo	84.300	
6	Edward Gal	Netherlands	Total Us	84.157	
7	Carina Cassøe Krüth	Denmark	Heiline's Danciera	83.329	
8	Carl Hester	Great Britain	En Vogue	81.818	
9	Juliette Ramel	Sweden	Buriel K.H.	81.182	
10	Steffen Peters	United States	Suppenkasper	80.968	
11	Nanna Skodborg Merrald	Denmark	Zack	80.893	
12	Hans Peter Minderhoud	Netherlands	Dream Boy	80.682	
13	Charlotte Fry	Great Britain	Everdale	80.614	
14	Therese Nilshagen	Sweden	Dante Weltino Old	79.721	
15	Dorothee Schneider	Germany	Showtime FRH	79.432	
16	Rodrigo Torres	Portugal	Fogoso	78.943	
17	Beatriz Ferrer-Salat	Spain	Elegance	77.532	
18	Brittany Fraser-Beaulieu	Canada	All In	76.404	
