= Equestrian at the 2020 Summer Olympics – Team dressage =

Olympic Equestrian Event

Team dressage at the Games of the XXXII Olympiad
- Olympic equestrian dressage
- Venue: Baji Koen
- Date: 24–27 July 2021
- Competitors: 44 from 15 nations

Medalists
1st place, gold medalist(s)		Jessica von Bredow-Werndl; Dorothee Schneider; Isabell Werth; Germany
2nd place, silver medalist(s)		Sabine Schut-Kery; Adrienne Lyle; Steffen Peters; United States
3rd place, bronze medalist(s)		Charlotte Fry; Carl Hester; Charlotte Dujardin; Great Britain

The team dressage event at the 2020 Summer Olympics is scheduled to take place from 24 to 27 July 2021 at the Baji Koen. Like all other equestrian events, the dressage competition is open-gender, with both male and female athletes competing in the same division. 45 riders (15 teams of 3) from 15 nations are expected to compete.

== Background ==
This will be the 21st appearance of the event. Unlike the rest of the current equestrian programme—five events which have been held continuously since 1912 (with one, individual jumping, also held in 1900)—there was no team dressage event in 1912, 1920, 1924, or 1960.

The two-time and reigning Olympic champions are Sönke Rothenberger, Dorothee Schneider, Kristina Bröring-Sprehe, and Isabell Werth of Germany; Germany has won 6 of the 7 times the event has been held since reunification of the nation (taking silver in the other, 2012), West Germany had won 4 of the 6 between the separation of East and West for Olympic purposes and reunification (boycotting 1980 and taking silver in 1972), and the United Team of Germany winning in 1964. The reigning (2018) World Champion is also Germany, with Rothenberger and Werth on the team along with Jessica von Bredow-Werndl and Dorothee Schneider. Rothenberger, Schneider, and Werth have been named as the Olympic team.

An Olympics.com preview of equestrian (all events) provided the following overview:

Germany has won the most gold medals in Olympic equestrian sports (26 to be exact), reflecting the country's equestrian heritage and passion for the sport. Michael Jung has dominated individual eventing at recent Games, winning gold in both London 2012 and Rio 2016. Jung was destined to carve his name into equestrian history: both his father and grandfather were well-known equestrian athletes. Sweden, France, the USA and Great Britain are among the other leading nations in equestrian sport.

== Qualification ==
A National Olympic Committee (NOC) could enter a team of 3 riders in the team dressage. Quota places are allocated to the NOC, which selects the riders. There were 15 team quota places available, allocated as follows:

- Host nation: Japan was guaranteed a team
- World Games: The top 6 teams at the 2018 FEI World Equestrian Games, excluding Japan
- European Championships: The top 3 teams from the 2019 FEI European Championships, in geographic groups A and B (Northwest and Southwest Europe)
- Group C event: The top team from a group C (Central Europe, Eastern Europe, and Central Asia) qualification event
- Pan American Games: The top 2 teams from the 2019 Pan-American Games, with groups D and E covering North, Central, and South America
- Group F event: The top team from a group F (Africa, Middle East) qualification event
- Group G at the World Games: The top team from group G (Southeast Asia, Oceania) was awarded via place at the World Games rather than a separate qualification event.

Withdrawals resulted in three places being reallocated to composite teams.

== Competition format ==
The competition format has changed from prior Games. There are now only 3 team members instead of 4, with no dropped score. The two rounds of the competition are the Grand Prix and the Grand Prix Special.

- Grand Prix: All 15 teams compete in the Grand Prix. The top 8 teams, based on the aggregate score of the team's 3 riders, advance to the final round. The Grand Prix is also the qualifying round for the individual event.
- Grand Prix Special: The 8 teams competing receive a final rank based only on the Grand Prix Special score, again the aggregate score of the 3 riders (the Grand Prix scores do not carry over). Grand Prix Special routines may be set to music.

== Schedule ==
The event takes place on three competition days over four days, with two days for the Grand Prix followed by a rest day and then the Grand Prix Special.

All times are Japan Standard Time (UTC+9).

Day	Date	Start	Finish	Phase
Day 1	Saturday, 24 July 2021	17:00	22:00	Grand Prix Day 1
Day 2	Sunday, 25 July 2021	17:00	22:00	Grand Prix Day 2
Day 4	Tuesday, 27 July 2021	17:30	22:40	Grand Prix Special

== Results ==
=== Grand Prix ===
Rank	Nation	Riders	Horses	Individual scores	Team score	Notes
1	Germany	Jessica von Bredow-Werndl; Dorothee Schneider; Isabell Werth	TSF Dalera; Showtime FRH; Bella Rose 2	2717.0; 2538.0; 2656.5	7911.5	Q
2	Great Britain	Charlotte Fry; Carl Hester; Charlotte Dujardin	Everdale En Vogue Gio	2482.5; 2419.0; 2617.0	7508.5	Q
3	Denmark	Cathrine Dufour; Nanna Skodborg Merrald; Carina Cassøe Krüth	Bohemian; Zack; Heiline's Danciera	2610.0; 2356.0; 2469.0	7435.0	Q
4	United States	Sabine Schut-Kery; Adrienne Lyle; Steffen Peters	Sanceo; Salvino; Suppenkasper	2525.0; 2411.0; 2453.5	7389.5	Q
5	Netherlands	Edward Gal; Hans Peter Minderhoud; Marlies van Baalen	Total Us; Dream Boy; Go Legend	2532.5; 2473.5; 2306.0	7312.0	Q
6	Sweden	Therese Nilshagen; Antonia Ramel; Juliette Ramel	Dante Weltino Old; Brother de Jeu; Buriel K.H.	2419.5; 2207.0; 2362.5	6969.0	Q
7	Portugal	Rodrigo Torres; Maria Caetano; João Miguel Torrão	Fogoso; Fenix de Tineo; Equador	2338.5; 2264.0; 2260.0	6862.5	Q
8	Spain	Beatriz Ferrer-Salat; José Antonio García Mena; Severo Jurado	Elegance; Sorento 15; Fendi T	2321.5; 2226.5; 2201.5	6749.5	Q
9	France	Alexandre Ayache; Morgan Barbançon; Maxime Collard	Zo What; Sir Donnerhall II OLD; Cupido PB	2219.5; 2271.5; 2224.0	6715.0	
10	Belgium	Larissa Pauluis; Laurence Roos; Domien Michiels	Flambeau; Fil Rouge; Intermezzo Van Het Meerdaalhof	2165.5; 2276.5; 2260.5	6702.5	
11	Canada	Chris von Martels; Lindsay Kellock; Brittany Fraser-Beaulieu	Eclips; Sebastien; All In	2191.5; 2106.0; 2308.0	6605.5	
12	ROC	Inessa Merkulova; Aleksandra Maksakova; Tatyana Kosterina	Mister X; Bojengels; Diavolessa VA	2236.5; 2057.5; 2056.5	6350.5	
13	Australia	Mary Hanna; Simone Pearce; Kelly Layne	Calanta; Destano; Samhitas	2189.0; 2205.5; 1879.0	6273.5	
14	Japan	Kazuki Sado; Shingo Hayashi; Hiroyuki Kitahara	Ludwig Der Sonnenkoenig 2; Scolari 4; Huracan 10	2013.5; 2116.0; 2135.0	6264.5	
—	Austria	Christian Schumach; Florian Bacher; Victoria Max-Theurer	Te Quiero SF; Fidertraum; Abegglen NRW	2283.0; 2248.0; WD	EL	

=== Grand Prix Special ===
Rank	Nation	Riders	Horses	Individual scores	Team score	Notes
1st place, gold medalist(s)	Germany	Jessica von Bredow-Werndl; Dorothee Schneider; Isabell Werth	TSF Dalera; Showtime FRH; Bella Rose 2	2785.5; 2652.0; 2740.5	8178.0	
2nd place, silver medalist(s)	United States	Sabine Schut-Kery; Adrienne Lyle; Steffen Peters	Sanceo; Salvino; Suppenkasper	2684.5; 2504.0; 2558.5	7747.0	
3rd place, bronze medalist(s)	Great Britain	Charlotte Fry; Carl Hester; Charlotte Dujardin	Everdale En Vogue Gio	2617.0; 2528.5; 2577.5	7723.0	
4	Denmark	Cathrine Dufour; Nanna Skodborg Merrald; Carina Cassøe Krüth	Bohemian; Zack; Heiline's Danciera	2557.0; 2441.5; 2541.5	7540.0	
5	Netherlands	Edward Gal; Hans Peter Minderhoud; Marlies van Baalen	Total Us; Dream Boy; Go Legend	2628.5; 2505.5; 2342.5	7479.5	
6	Sweden	Therese Nilshagen; Antonia Ramel; Juliette Ramel	Dante Weltino Old; Brother de Jeu; Buriel K.H.	2500.0; 2219.0; 2491.0	7210.0	
7	Spain	Beatriz Ferrer-Salat; José Antonio García Mena; Severo Jurado	Elegance; Sorento 15; Fendi T	2464.0; 2426.5; 2308.0	7198.5	
8	Portugal	Rodrigo Torres; Maria Caetano; João Miguel Torrão	Fogoso; Fenix de Tineo; Equador	2458.5; 2260.0; 2247.0	6965.5	
