= 2019 in equestrianism =

== 2019 Rolex Grand Slam of Show Jumping ==
- March 14 – 17: The Dutch Masters 2019 (GSSJ #1) in (Netherlands) 's-Hertogenbosch
  - Winner: (Sweden) Henrik von Eckermann (with horse Toveks Mary Lou)
- July 12 – 21: CHIO Aachen 2019 (GSSJ #2) in (Germany) Aachen
  - Winner: (United States) Kent Farrington (with horse Gazelle)
- September 4 – 8: 2019 CSIO Spruce Meadows “Masters” (GSSJ #3) in (Canada) Calgary
  - Winner: (United States) Beezie Madden (with horse Darry Lou)
- December 12 – 15: The CHI Geneva, Switzerland, 2019 (GSSJ #4; final) in Geneva

== 2019 Global Champions Tour ==
- February 28 – March 2: GCT #1 in (Qatar) Doha Winner: (France) Julien Epaillard (with horse Usual Suspect d'Auge)
- April 11 – 13: GCT #2 in Mexico City Winner: (Belgium) Jérôme Guery (with horse Quel Homme de Hus)
- April 18 – 20: GCT #3 in (United States) Miami Beach Winner: (Belgium) Pieter Devos (with horse Claire Z)
- May 3 – 5: GCT #4 in (China) Shanghai Winner: (Israel) Dani G. Waldman (with horse Lizziemary)
- May 17 – 19: GCT #5 in (Spain) Madrid Winner: (Switzerland) Martin Fuchs (with horse Chaplin)
- May 29 – June 1: GCT #6 in (Germany) Hamburg Winner: (Germany) Daniel Deusser (with horse Jasmien V. Bisschop)
- June 6 – 8: GCT #7 in (France) Cannes Winner: (Belgium) Niels Bruynseels (with horse Gancia de Muze)
- June 14 – 16: GCT #8 in (Sweden) Stockholm Winner: (Sweden) Peder Fredricson (with horse H&M All In)
- June 20 – 22: GCT #9 in (Portugal) Cascais-Estoril Winner: (Switzerland) Martin Fuchs (with horse Chaplin)
- June 27 – 29: GCT #10 in Monaco Winner: (Netherlands) Maikel van der Vleuten (with horse Beauville Z)
- July 5 – 7: GCT #11 in (France) Paris Winner: (Germany) Christian Ahlmann (with horse Take A Chance On Me Z)
- July 12 – 14: GCT #12 in (France) Chantilly Winner: (Republic of Ireland) Darragh Kenny (with horse Balou du Reventon)
- July 26 – 28: GCT #13 in (Germany) Berlin Winner: (Israel) Dani G. Waldman (with horse Lizziemary)
- August 2 – 4: GCT #14 in (United Kingdom) London Winner: (United Kingdom) Ben Maher (with horse Explosion W)
- August 9 – 11: GCT #15 in (Netherlands) Valkenswaard Winner: (Netherlands) Maikel van der Vleuten (with horse Dana Blue)
- September 6 – 8: GCT #16 in (Italy) Rome Winner: (United Kingdom) Ben Maher (with horse Explosion W)
- September 12 – 14: GCT #17 in (France) Ramatuelle-Saint-Tropez Winner: (United States) Jessica Springsteen (with horse RMF Zecilie)
- September 27 – 29: GCT #18 in (United States) New York City Winner: (United Kingdom) Ben Maher (with horse Explosion W)
- November 21 – 24: GCT #19 (final) in (Czech Republic) Prague

== 2018–19 FEI World Cup Jumping ==
- April 17, 2018 – November 18, 2018: 2018 FEI World Cup Jumping – South America South League
  - Winner: (Brazil) Luiz Felipe Pimenta Alves (with horse GB Celine)
- April 21, 2018 – December 1, 2018: 2018 FEI World Cup Jumping – Japan League
  - Winner: (Japan) Shino Hirota (with horse Life Is Beautiful)
- April 26, 2018 – May 27, 2018: 2018 FEI World Cup Jumping – Central Asian League (incomplete)
  - Winner: (Kyrgyzstan) Kamil Sabitov (with horse Quintendro)
- April 26, 2018 – October 28, 2018: 2018 FEI World Cup Jumping – (South Africa) South African League
  - Winner: (United States) Marlene Sinclair (with horse Camaro)
- April 28, 2018 – October 7, 2018: 2018 FEI World Cup Jumping – China League
  - Winner: (China) LIU Tongyan (with horses Ku Bu Qi & Yu Long Qi Ji)
- May 10, 2018 – March 10, 2019: 2018–19 FEI World Cup Jumping – Central European League
  - North CEL winner: (Estonia) Kullo Kender (with horse Artas)
  - South CEL winner: (Romania) Andrea Herck (with three different horses)
    - March 7 – 10: 2019 Central European League Final in (Poland) Warsaw
      - Winner: (Poland) Wojciech Wojcianiec (with horse Naccord Melloni)
    - Overall winner: (Poland) Jaroslaw Skrzyczynski
- June 20, 2018 – February 8, 2019: 2018–19 FEI World Cup Jumping – Caucasus-Caspian League
  - Winner: (Iran) Masoud Mokarinezhad (with horse Confident To Fly SB)
- July 28, 2018 – February 3, 2019: 2018–19 FEI World Cup Jumping – (Australia) Australian League
  - Winner: (Australia) Aaron Hadlow (with horse Vahlinvader)
- August 21, 2018 – March 10, 2019: 2018–19 FEI World Cup Jumping – North American League
  - Eastern NAL winner: (United States) Beezie Madden (with 4 different horses)
  - Western NAL winner: (United States) Richard Spooner (with horses Quirado RC & Quitana 11)
- August 30, 2018 – February 2, 2019: 2018–19 FEI World Cup Jumping – Arab League
  - Middle East Sub-League winner: (Saudi Arabia) Ramzy Al-Duhami (with horses Ted & High Quality J)
  - North African Sub-League winner: (Egypt) Abdel Saïd (with horses Venise du Reverdy & Jumpy van de Hermitage)
- October 10, 2018 – February 10, 2019: 2018–19 FEI World Cup Jumping – (European Union) Western European League
  - Winner: (Germany) Daniel Deusser (with three different horses)
- October 19, 2018 – December 16, 2018: 2018 FEI World Cup Jumping – South East Asian League
  - Winner: (Thailand) Siengsaw Lertratanachai (with horse Courville L)
- October 19, 2018 – January 13, 2019: 2018–19 FEI World Cup Jumping – New Zealand League
  - Winner: (New Zealand) Tegan Fitzsimon (with horse Windermere Cappuccino)

== 2018–19 FEI World Cup Dressage ==
- March 22, 2018 – March 23, 2019: 2018–19 FEI World Cup Dressage – (Pacific Community) Pacific League
  - Werribee #1 winner: (Australia) Alexis Hellyer (with horse Bluefields Floreno)
  - Boneo #1 winner: (Australia) Brett Parbery (with horse DP Weltmieser)
  - Boneo #2 winner: (Australia) Matthew Dowsley (with horse AEA Prestige)
  - Melbourne winner: (Australia) Suzanne Hearn (with horse Remmington)
  - Boneo #3 winner: (Australia) Rozzie Ryan (with horse Jarrah R)
  - Werribee #2 winner: (Australia) Katharine Farrell (with horse Luxor 118)
- April 25, 2018 – March 10, 2019: 2018–19 FEI World Cup Dressage – Central European League
  - Note: There was a tie for first place in this overall event.
  - Winner #1: (Russia) Regina Isachkina (with horses Sun of May Life & La Fleur)
  - Winner #2: (Russia) Stanislav Cherednichenko (with horse Arums)
- April 26, 2018 – April 14, 2019: 2018–19 FEI World Cup Dressage – North American League
  - Del Mar Fairgrounds winner: (United States) Steffen Peters (with horse Suppenkasper)
  - Saugerties #1 winner: (United States) Laura Noyes Putnam (with horse Galveston) (default)
  - Saugerties #2 winner: (United States) Jane Karol (with horse Sunshine Tour) (default)
  - Devon winner: (United States) Jessica Jo Tate (with horse Faberge)
  - Wellington #1 winner: (United States) Laura Graves (with horse Verdades)
  - Wellington #2 winner: (United States) Laura Graves (with horse Verdades)
  - Temecula #1 winner: (United States) Nick Wagman (with horse Don John)
  - Wellington #3 winner: (United States) Kasey Perry-Glass (with horse Goerklintgaards Dublet)
  - Wellington #4 winner: (United States) Laura Graves (with horse Verdades)
  - Temecula #2 winner: (United States) Jennifer Schrader-Williams (with horse Millione) (default)
  - Temecula #3 winner: (United States) Steffen Peters (with horse Suppenkasper)
- October 17, 2018 – March 17, 2019: 2018–19 FEI World Cup Dressage – (Europe) Western European League
  - Winner: (Germany) Helen Langehanenberg (with horse Damsey FRH)

== 2019 Show Jumping World Cup and Dressage World Cup Finals ==
- April 3 – 7: 2019 FEI World Cup Show Jumping and Dressage Finals in (Sweden) Gothenburg
  - Jumping winner: (Switzerland) Steve Guerdat (with horse Alamo)
  - Dressage winner: (Germany) Isabell Werth (with horse Weihegold OLD)

== 2019 FEI Nations Cup Jumping ==
- February 13 – 17: NCJ #1 in (United States) Wellington (Deeridge Farms)
  - Individual winners: Three different riders and horses took first place here.
  - Team winners: Mexico (Fernando Martínez Sommer (with horse Cor Bakker), Eugenio Garza Perez (with horse Victer Finn DH Z), Juan Jose Zendejas Salgado (with horse Tino la Chapelle), & Manuel González Dufrane (with horse Hortensia van de Leeuwerk))
- February 20 – 23: NCJ #2 in (United Arab Emirates) Abu Dhabi
  - Individual winner: (Egypt) Abdel Said (with horse Venise du Reverdy)
  - Team winners: Germany (Mario Stevens (with horse Talisman de Mazure), Sven Schlüsselburg (with horse Bud Spencer 7), Miriam Schneider (with horse Fidelius G), & Philipp Weishaupt (with horse Catokia 2))
- May 2 – 5: NCJ #3 in Xalapa (Coapexpan)
  - Individual winner: (Mexico) Lorenza O'Farrill (with horse Queens Darling)
  - Team winners: Mexico (Patricio Pasquel (with horse Babel), Manuel González Dufrane (with horse Hortensia van de Leeuwerk), Lorenza O'Farrill (with horse Queens Darling), & Salvador Oñate (with horse Big Red))
- May 16 – 19: NCJ #4 in (France) La Baule-Escoublac
  - Individual winners: Five different riders and horses took first place here.
  - Team winners: Switzerland (Niklaus Rutschi (with horse Cardano CH), Bryan Balsiger (with horse Clouzot de Lassus), Paul Estermann (with horse Lord Pepsi), & Steve Guerdat (with horse Albfuehren's Bianca))
- May 28 – June 2: NCJ #5 in Langley
  - Individual winners: Six different riders and horses took first place here.
  - Team winners: Canada (Lisa Carlsen (with horse Parette), Nicole Walker (with horse Falco van Spieveld), Tiffany Foster (with horse Figor), & Mario Deslauriers (with horse Bardolina 2))
- May 30 – June 2: NCJ #6 in (Switzerland) St. Gallen
  - Individual winners: Five different riders and horses took first place here.
  - Team winners: France (Pénélope Leprevost (with horse Vancouver de Lanlore), Guillaume Foutrier (with horse Valdocco des Caps), Nicolas Delmotte (with horse Urvoso du Roch), & Kevin Staut (with horse Calevo 2))
- June 13 – 16: NCJ #7 in (Poland) Sopot
  - Individual winners: Four different riders and horses took first place here.
  - Team winners: Belgium (Niels Bruynseels (with horse Delux van T & L), Gudrun Patteet (with horse Sea Coast Valdelamadre Clooney), Yves Vanderhasselt (with horse Jeunesse), & Pieter Devos (with horse Apart))
- June 20 – 23: NCJ #8 in (Netherlands) Geesteren
  - Individual winner: (Brazil) Felipe Amaral (with horse Germanico T)
  - Team winners: Brazil (Marlon Modolo Zanotelli (with horse Sirene de la Motte), Felipe Amaral (with horse Germanico T), Pedro Junqueira Muylaert (with horse C'est Dorijke), & Pedro Veniss (with horse Quabri de L'Isle))
- July 11 – 14: NCJ #9 in Falsterbo
  - Individual winners: Four different riders and horses took first place here.
  - Team winners: Sweden (Malin Baryard-Johnsson (with horse H&M Indiana), Fredrik Jonsson (with horse Cold Play), Stephanie Holmen (with horse Flip's Little Sparrow), & Peder Fredricson (with horse H&M All In))
- July 25 – 28: NCJ #10 in (United Kingdom) Hickstead (West Sussex)
  - Individual winners: Seven different riders and horses took first place here.
  - Team winners: Sweden (Fredrik Jonsson (with horse Cold Play), Angelie von Essen (with horse Luikan Q), Peder Fredricson (with horse Zacramento), & Rolf-Göran Bengtsson (with horse Oak Grove's Carlyle))
- August 7 – 11: NCJ #11 in (Republic of Ireland) Dublin
  - Individual winners: Three different riders and horses took first place here.
  - Team winners: Great Britain (Ben Maher (with horse Concona), Scott Brash (with horse Hello Jefferson), Emily Moffitt (with horse Winning Good), & Holly Smith (with horse Hearts Destiny))
- October 3 – 6: Longines FEI Jumping Nations Cup Final in (Spain) Barcelona
  - Individual winner: (Italy) Massimo Grossato (with horse Lazzaro delle Schiave)
  - Team winners: Ireland (Peter Moloney (with horse Chianti's Champion), Paul O'Shea (with horse Skara Glen's Machu Picchu), Darragh Kenny (with horse Balou du Reventon), & Cian O'Connor (with horse PSG Final))

== 2019 FEI Nations Cup Dressage ==
- March 12 – 17: NCD #1 in Wellington
  - Individual winner: (United States) Shelly Francis (with horse Danilo)
  - Team winners: United States (Ashley Holzer (with horse Valentine), Jennifer Baumert (with horse Handsome), Charlotte Jorst (with horse Kastel's Nintendo), & Shelly Francis (with horse Danilo))
- May 16 – 19: NCD #2 in (France) Compiègne
  - Individual winner: (Netherlands) Emmelie Scholtens (with horse Desperado)
  - Team winners: Great Britain (Richard Davison (with horse Bubblingh), Charlotte Fry (with horse Dark Legend), Carl Hester (with horse Hawtins Delicato), & Gareth Hughes (with horse Classic Briolinca))
- May 23 – 26: NCD #3 in Uggerhalne
  - Individual winner: (Denmark) Agnete Kirk Thinggaard (with horse Jojo AZ)
  - Team winners: Denmark (Agnete Kirk Thinggaard (with horse Jojo AZ), Daniel Bachmann Andersen (with horse Blue Hors Don Olymbrio), Cathrine Dufour (with horse Bohemian), & Carina Cassøe Krüth (with horse May-Day Graftebjerg))
- June 17 – 23: NCD #4 in Geesteren
  - Individual winner: (Netherlands) Edward Gal (with horse Glock's Zonik N.O.P.)
  - Team winners: Netherlands (Edward Gal (with horse Glock's Zonik N.O.P.), Emmelie Scholtens (with horse Desperado), Anne Meulendijks (with horse MDH Avanti N.O.P., & Hans Peter Minderhoud (with horse Glock's Dream Boy N.O.P.))
- July 5 – 7: NCD #5 in (Finland) Järvenpää
  - Individual winner: (Finland) Henri Ruoste (with horse Roble)
  - Team winners: Sweden (Gunilla Byström (with horse Vectra), Märit Olofsson Nääs (with horse Strolchi), Lena Wiman (with horse Donnerstein), & Tinne Vilhelmson-Silfvén (with horse Esperance))
- July 11 – 14: NCD #6 in Falsterbo
  - Individual winner: (Denmark) Daniel Bachmann Andersen (with horse Blue Hors Zack)
  - Team winners: Sweden (Patrik Kittel (with horse Well Done de la Roche CMF), Juliette Ramel (with horse Wall Street JV), Malin Wahlkamp-Nilsson (with horse Eddieni), & Minna Telde (with horse Isac))
- July 17 – 21: NCD #7 in Aachen
  - Individual winner: (Germany) Isabell Werth (with horse Bella Rose 2)
  - Team winners: Germany (Jessica von Bredow-Werndl (with horse TSF Dalera BB), Helen Langehanenberg (with horse Damsey FRH), Isabell Werth (with horse Bella Rose 2), & Dorothee Schneider (with horse Showtime FRH))
- July 25 – 28: NCD #8 (final) in (United Kingdom) Hickstead (West Sussex)
  - Individual winner: (United Kingdom) Lara Butler (with horse Rubin Al-Asad)
  - Team winners: Portugal (Miguel Ralão Duarte (with horse Xenofonte d'Atela), Duarte Nogueira (with horse Beirao), Rodrigo Torres (with horse Fogoso), & João Miguel Torrao (with horse Equador))

== 2019 FEI Nations Cup Eventing ==
- May 23 – 26: NCE #1 in (United Kingdom) Houghton Hall
  - Individual winner: (Germany) Christoph Wahler (with horse Carjatan S)
  - Team winners: Germany (Christoph Wahler (with horse Carjatan S), Jerome Robine (with horse Quaddeldou R Old), Ingrid Klimke (with horse Asha P), & Felix Etzel (with horse Bandit 436))
- June 5 – 9: NCE #2 in (Italy) Pratoni del Vivaro (Olympic Qualifier for 2020)
  - Individual winner: (Sweden) Niklas Lindbäck (with horse Focus Filiocus)
  - Team winners: Switzerland (Tiziana Realini (with horse Toubleu de Rueire), Caroline Gerber (with horse Tresor de Chignan CH), & Patrizia Attinger (with horse Mooney Amach))
- June 26 – 30: NCE #3 in (Poland) Strzegom
  - Individual winner: (Germany) Michael Jung (with horse Fischerchipmunk FRH)
  - Team winners: Germany (Michael Jung (with horse Fischerchipmunk FRH), Andreas Dibowski (with horse FRH Corrida), Josefa Sommer (with horse Hamilton 24), & Miriam Engel (with horse Bonita Bella))
- July 24 – 28: NCE #4 in (Republic of Ireland) Camphire Cappoquin
  - Individual winner: (Republic of Ireland) Sam Watson (with horse Imperial Sky)
  - Team winners: New Zealand (Tim Price (with horse Bango), Mark Todd (with horse Leonidas II), & Jonelle Price (with horse Grappa Nera))
- August 7 – 11: NCE #5 in Le Pin-au-Haras
  - Individual winner: (France) Karim Florent Laghouag (with horse Punch de l'Esques)
  - Team winners: France (Karim Florent Laghouag (with horse Punch de l'Esques), Clara Loiseau (with horse Wont Wait), Jean Teulère (with horse Voila d'Auzay), & Thais Meheust (with horse Quamilha))
- September 19 – 22: NCE #6 in (Belgium) Waregem
  - Individual winner: (Germany) Ingrid Klimke (with horse SAP Asha P)
  - Team winners: Germany (Ingrid Klimke (with horse SAP Asha P), Andreas Dibowski (with horse FRH Butts Avedon), Andreas Ostholt (with horse Corvette 31), & Frank Ostholt (with horse Jum Jum))
- October 10 – 13: NCE #7 (final) in (Netherlands) Boekelo (Olympic Qualifier for 2020)
  - Individual winner: (United Kingdom) Laura Collett (with horse London 52)
  - Team winners: Germany (Sandra Auffarth (with horse Let's Dance 73), Michael Jung (with horse Fischerrocana FRH), Ingrid Klimke (with horse SAP Asha P), & Anna Siemer (with horse Betel's Bella))

== Horse racing ==
=== United States ===
US Triple Crown

- May 4: 2019 Kentucky Derby at Churchill Downs
  - Horse: (United States) Country House; Jockey: (France) Flavien Prat; Trainer: (United States) William I. Mott
- May 18: 2019 Preakness Stakes at (Maryland) Pimlico
  - Horse: (United States) War of Will; Jockey: (United States) Tyler Gaffalione; Trainer: (United States) Mark E. Casse
- June 8: 2019 Belmont Stakes at (New York (state)) Belmont Park
  - Horse: (United States) Sir Winston; Jockey: (Dominican Republic) Joel Rosario; Trainer: (United States) Mark E. Casse

Breeders' Cup

- November 1 & 2: 2019 Breeders' Cup at (Kentucky) Churchill Downs.

Other notable races

- January 26: 2019 Pegasus World Cup at (Florida) Gulfstream Park
  - Horse: (United States) City of Light; Jockey: (Venezuela) Javier Castellano; Trainer: (United States) Michael McCarthy
- June 8: 2019 Metropolitan Handicap at (New York (state)) Belmont Park
  - Horse: (United States) Mitole; Jockey: (Panama) Ricardo Santana Jr.; Trainer: (United States) Steven M. Asmussen
- TBA: 2019 Haskell Invitational Stakes at (New Jersey) Monmouth Park
- TBA: 2019 Arlington Million at (Illinois) Arlington Park
- TBA: 2019 Pacific Classic Stakes at (California) Del Mar Racetrack
- TBA: 2019 Travers Stakes at (New York (state)) Saratoga Race Course
- TBA: 2019 Jockey Club Gold Cup at (New York (state)) Belmont Park

=== United Kingdom ===
British Classic Races

- May 4: 2019 2000 Guineas Stakes at (United Kingdom) Newmarket
  - Winner: (Republic of Ireland) Magna Grecia (Jockey: Donnacha O'Brien, Trainer: Aidan O'Brien)
- May 5: 2019 1000 Guineas Stakes at (United Kingdom) Newmarket
  - Winner: (Republic of Ireland) Hermosa (Jockey: Wayne Lordan, Trainer: Aidan O'Brien)
- May 31: 2019 Epsom Oaks at (United Kingdom) Epsom
  - Winner: (United Kingdom) Anapurna (Jockey: Frankie Dettori, Trainer: John Gosden)
- June 1: 2019 Epsom Derby at (United Kingdom) Epsom
  - Winner: (Republic of Ireland) Anthony Van Dyck (Jockey: Seamie Heffernan, Trainer: Aidan O'Brien)
- TBA: 2019 St Leger Stakes at (United Kingdom) Doncaster

Other notable races

- TBA: 2019 King George VI and Queen Elizabeth Stakes at (United Kingdom) Ascot
- TBA: 2019 International Stakes at (United Kingdom) York
- TBA: 2019 British Champions Day at (United Kingdom) Ascot

=== Ireland ===
Irish Classic Races

- May 25: 2019 Irish 2,000 Guineas at (Republic of Ireland) Curragh
  - Winner: (Republic of Ireland) Phoenix of Spain (Jockey: Jamie Spencer, Trainer: Charles Hills)
- May 26: 2019 Irish 1,000 Guineas at (Republic of Ireland) Curragh
  - Winner: (Republic of Ireland) Hermosa (Jockey: Ryan Moore, Trainer: Aidan O'Brien)
- June 29: 2019 Irish Derby at (Republic of Ireland) Curragh
  - Winner: (Republic of Ireland) Sovereign (Jockey: Padraig Beggy, Trainer: Aidan O'Brien)
- TBA: 2019 Irish Oaks at (Republic of Ireland) Curragh
- TBA: 2019 Irish St. Leger at (Republic of Ireland) Curragh

Other notable races

- TBA: 2019 Irish Champion Stakes at (Republic of Ireland) Leopardstown

=== France ===
French Classic Races

- May 12: 2019 Poule d'Essai des Pouliches (French 1,000 Guineas) at (France) Longchamp
  - Winner: (Republic of Ireland) Castle Lady (Jockey: Mickael Barzalona, Trainer: Henri-Alex Pantell)
- May 12: 2019 Poule d'Essai des Poulains (French 2,000 Guineas) at (France) Longchamp
  - Winner: (Republic of Ireland) Persian King (Jockey: Pierre-Charles Boudot, Trainer: (France) André Fabre)
- June 2: 2019 Prix du Jockey Club (French Derby) at (France) Chantilly
  - Winner: (France) Sottsass (Jockey: Cristian Demuro, Trainer: Jean-Claude Rouget)
- June 16: 2019 Prix de Diane (French Oaks) at (France) Chantilly
  - Winner: (Republic of Ireland) Channel (Jockey: Pierre-Charles Boudot, Trainer: Francis-Henri Graffard)
- TBA: 2019 Grand Prix de Paris at (France) Longchamp
- TBA: 2019 Prix Royal-Oak (French St Leger) at (France) Longchamp

Other notable races

- June 30: 2019 Grand Prix de Saint-Cloud at (France) Saint-Cloud
  - Winner: (United Kingdom) Coronet (Jockey: Frankie Dettori, Trainer: John Gosden)
- TBA: 2019 Prix de l'Arc de Triomphe at (France) Longchamp

=== Australia ===
Australian Triple Crown

- March 9: 2019 Randwick Guineas at (Australia) Randwick
  - Winner: (Australia) The Autumn Sun (Jockey: Kerrin McEvoy, Trainer: Chris Waller)
- March 23: 2019 Rosehill Guineas at (Australia) Rosehill
  - Winner: (Australia) The Autumn Sun (Jockey: Kerrin McEvoy, Trainer: Chris Waller)
- April 6: 2019 Australian Derby at (Australia) Randwick
  - Winner: (Australia) Angel of Truth (Jockey: Corey Brown, Trainer: Gwenda Markwell)

Other notable races

- April 13: 2019 Queen Elizabeth Stakes at (Australia) Randwick
  - Winner: (Australia) Winx (Jockey: Hugh Bowman, Trainer: Chris Waller)
- October 19: 2019 Caulfield Cup at (Australia) Caulfield
- October 26: 2019 W. S. Cox Plate at (Australia) Moonee Valley
- November 5: 2019 Melbourne Cup at (Australia) Flemington

=== Canada ===
Canadian Triple Crown

- June 29: 2019 Queen's Plate at (Ontario) Woodbine
  - Winner: (Canada) One Bad Boy (Jockey: Flavien Prat, Trainer: Richard Baltas)
- July 23: 2019 Prince of Wales Stakes at (Ontario) Fort Erie
- August 17: 2019 Breeders' Stakes at (Ontario) Woodbine

Other notable races

- October 12: 2019 Canadian International Stakes at (Ontario) Woodbine

=== Hong Kong ===
Hong Kong Triple Crown

- January 20: 2019 Hong Kong Stewards' Cup at Sha Tin
  - Winner: (Hong Kong) Beauty Generation (Trainer: John Moore, Jockey: Zac Purton)
- February 17: 2019 Hong Kong Gold Cup at Sha Tin
  - Winner: (Hong Kong) Exultant (Trainer: Anthony S. Cruz, Jockey: Zac Purton)
- May 26: 2019 Hong Kong Champions & Chater Cup at Sha Tin

Other notable races

- April 28: 2019 Queen Elizabeth II Cup at (Hong Kong) Sha Tin
  - Winner: (Japan) Win Bright (Trainer: Yoshihiro Hatakeyama, Jockey: Masami Matsuoka)
- TBA: 2019 Hong Kong Cup at Sha Tin

=== Other international horse racing events ===
- March 30: 2019 Dubai World Cup at (United Arab Emirates) Meydan
  - Winner: (Republic of Ireland) Thunder Snow (Jockey: Christophe Soumillon, Trainer: Saeed bin Suroor)
- March 30: 2019 Dubai Sheema Classic at (United Arab Emirates) Meydan
  - Winner: (United Kingdom) Old Persian (Jockey: William Buick, Trainer: Charlie Appleby)
- TBA: 2019 Japan Cup at Tokyo
