= Austria at the 2020 Summer Olympics =

- IOC code: AUT
- NOC: Austrian Olympic Committee
- Website: www.olympia.at (in German)

in Tokyo, Japan 23 July-8 August
- Competitors: 75 (36 men and 39 women) in 20 sports
- Flag bearers (opening): Tanja Frank; Thomas Zajac
- Flag bearer (closing): Andreas Müller
- Medals Ranked 53rd: Gold 1 Silver 1 Bronze 5 Total 7

Summer Olympics appearances (overview)
- 1896; 1900; ~~1904~~; 1908; 1912; 1920; 1924; 1928; 1932; 1936; 1948; 1952; 1956; 1960; 1964; 1968; 1972; 1976; 1980; 1984; 1988; 1992; 1996; 2000; 2004; 2008; 2012; 2016; 2020; 2024; 2028

Other related appearances
- 1906 Intercalated Games

Austria competed at the 2020 Summer Olympics in Tokyo. Originally scheduled to take place from 24 July to 9 August 2020, the Olympic Games were postponed to 23 July to 8 August 2021, because of the COVID-19 pandemic. It was the nation's twenty-eighth appearance at the Summer Olympics.

Austria won seven medals, a significant improvement on their 2016 result, when the country won only a single bronze medal. In women's road race, Anna Kiesenhofer won Austria's first gold medal at the Summer Olympics since 2004.

Equestrian Victoria Max-Theurer withdrew from the Olympics because her horse had a dental problem.

== Medalists ==
Medal	Name	Sport	Event	Date
Gold	Anna Kiesenhofer	Cycling	Women's individual road race	25 July
Silver	Michaela Polleres	Judo	Women's 70 kg	28 July
Bronze	Shamil Borchashvili	Judo	Men's 81 kg	27 July
Bronze	Magdalena Lobnig	Rowing	Women's single sculls	30 July
Bronze	Lukas Weißhaidinger	Athletics	Men's discus throw	31 July
Bronze	Bettina Plank	Karate	Women's 55 kg	5 August
Bronze	Jakob Schubert	Sport climbing	Men's combined	5 August

== Competitors ==
The following is the list of number of competitors from the Austrian delegation participating in the Games:

Sport	Men	Women	Total
Artistic swimming	—N/a	2	2
Athletics	3	4	7
Badminton	1	0	1
Canoeing	1	5	6
Cycling	6	2	8
Equestrian	2	3	5
Golf	2	1	3
Gymnastics	0	1	1
Judo	2	4	6
Karate	0	1	1
Modern pentathlon	1	0	1
Rowing	0	3	3
Sailing	3	3	6
Shooting	1	1	2
Skateboarding	0	1	1
Sport climbing	1	1	2
Swimming	5	2	7
Table tennis	3	3	6
Tennis	2	0	2
Triathlon	2	2	4
Weightlifting	1	1	2
Total	36	39	75

== Artistic swimming ==
Austria fielded a squad of two artistic swimmers to compete in the women's duet event, who qualified by winning the gold medal at the 2021 FINA Olympic Qualification Tournament in Barcelona, Spain.

Athlete	Event	Technical routine		Free routine (preliminary)			Free routine (final)		
Athlete	Event	Points	Rank	Points	Total (technical + free)	Rank	Points	Total (technical + free)	Rank
Anna-Maria Alexandri; Eirini Alexandri	Duet	90.3773	7	90.5000	180.8773	7 Q	91.8000	182.1773	7

== Athletics ==
Key

- Note–Ranks given for track events are within the athlete's heat only
- Q = Qualified for the next round
- q = Qualified for the next round as a fastest loser or, in field events, by position without achieving the qualifying target
- NR = National record
- N/A = Round not applicable for the event
- Bye = Athlete not required to compete in round

Track & road events

Athlete	Event	Heat		Semifinal		Final	
Athlete	Event	Result	Rank	Result	Rank	Result	Rank
Peter Herzog	Men's marathon	—N/a				2:22:15	61
Lemawork Ketema	Men's marathon	—N/a				DNF	
Susanne Walli	Women's 400 m	52.19	3 Q	51.52 PB	6	Did not advance	

Field events

Athlete	Event	Qualification		Final	
Athlete	Event	Distance	Position	Distance	Position
Lukas Weißhaidinger	Men's discus throw	64.77	5 q	67.07	3rd place, bronze medalist(s)
Victoria Hudson	Women's javelin throw	58.60	21	Did not advance	

Combined events – Women's heptathlon

Athlete	Event	100H	HJ	SP	200 m	LJ	JT	800 m	Total	Rank
Ivona Dadic	Result	13.61	1.83 =PB	14.10 SB	24.33 SB	6.11 SB	48.40 SB	2:15.10 SB	6403 SB	8
Ivona Dadic	Points	1034	1016	801	949	883	829	891	6403 SB	8
Verena Preiner	Result	13.65	1.77 =SB	13.59	24.55 SB	6.12	44.95	2:07.92	6310 SB	11
Verena Preiner	Points	1028	941	767	929	887	763	995	6310 SB	11

== Badminton ==
Austria entered one badminton player into the Olympic tournament. Luka Wraber secured the men's singles spot at the Games based on the BWF Race to Tokyo Rankings.

Athlete	Event	Group stage			Elimination	Quarterfinal	Semifinal	Final / BM	
Athlete	Event	Opposition Score	Opposition Score	Rank	Opposition Score	Opposition Score	Opposition Score	Opposition Score	Rank
Luka Wraber	Men's singles	Axelsen (DEN); L (12–21, 11–21)	Koljonen (FIN); L (13–21, 17–21)	3	Did not advance				

== Canoeing ==
=== Slalom ===
Austrian canoeists qualified one boat for each of the following classes through the 2019 ICF Canoe Slalom World Championships in La Seu d'Urgell, Spain.

Athlete	Event	Preliminary						Semifinal		Final	
Athlete	Event	Run 1	Rank	Run 2	Rank	Best	Rank	Time	Rank	Time	Rank
Felix Oschmautz	Men's K-1	94.10	8	92.18	7	92.18	7 Q	98.42	9 Q	98.79	4
Nadine Weratschnig	Women's C-1	112.47	4	115.56	10	112.47	6	119.69	7	119.41	5
Viktoria Wolffhardt	Women's K-1	114.63	14	112.28	15	112.28	16 Q	112.11	11	Did not advance	

== Cycling ==
=== Road ===
Austria sent a delegation of four riders (three men and one woman) to compete in their respective Olympic road races, by virtue of their top 50 national finish (for men) and her top 100 individual finish (for women) in the UCI World Ranking.

Athlete	Event	Time	Rank
Patrick Konrad	Men's road race	6:09:04	18
Patrick Konrad	Men's time trial	1:02:05.08	31
Gregor Mühlberger	Men's road race	6:21:46	70
Hermann Pernsteiner	Men's road race	6:13:17	30
Anna Kiesenhofer	Women's road race	3:52:45	1st place, gold medalist(s)

=== Track ===
Following the completion of the 2020 UCI Track Cycling World Championships, Austrian riders accumulated spots in the men's omnium and madison based on their country's results in the final UCI Olympic rankings.

Omnium

Athlete	Event	Scratch Race		Tempo Race		Elimination Race		Points Race		Total points	Rank
Athlete	Event	Rank	Points	Rank	Points	Rank	Points	Rank	Points	Total points	Rank
Andreas Müller	Men's omnium	19	4	19	2	20	2	18	0	8	18

Madison

Athlete	Event	Points	Laps	Rank
Andreas Graf; Andreas Müller	Men's madison	DNF	20	=12

=== Mountain biking ===
Austrian mountain bikers qualified for one men's and one women's quota place each into the Olympic cross-country race, as a result of the nation's ninth-place-finish for men and fifteenth for women, respectively, in the UCI Olympic Ranking List of 16 May 2021.

Athlete	Event	Time	Rank
Maximilian Foidl	Men's cross-country	1:28:45	17
Laura Stigger	Women's cross-country	DNF	

== Equestrian ==
Austria entered one eventing rider into the Olympic equestrian competition by securing the last of six available slots, outside the group and continental selection, in the individual FEI Olympic rankings. Meanwhile, a composite squad of three dressage riders was formed and thereby added to the Austrian roster by receiving a spare berth freed up by one of two nations, unable to fulfill the NOC Certificate of Capability, based on their individual results in the FEI Olympic rankings at the end of 2019 season. With Pakistan failing to comply with the minimum eligibility requirements, Austria received an invitation from FEI to send an additional eventing rider to the Games, as the next highest-ranked eligible nation outside of the group and continental selection.

=== Dressage ===
The Austrian dressage team was named on June 11, 2021. The team is led by four-time Olympian Victoria Max-Theurer, who is joined by Florian Bacher and Christian Schumach.

Athlete	Horse	Event	Grand Prix		Grand Prix Special		Grand Prix Freestyle		Overall	
Athlete	Horse	Event	Score	Rank	Score	Rank	Technical	Artistic	Score	Rank
Florian Bacher	Fidertraum	Individual	69.813	30	—N/a		Did not advance			
Victoria Max-Theurer	Abegglen	Individual	Withdrew		—N/a		Did not advance			
Christian Schumach	Te Quiero	Individual	70.900	21	—N/a		Did not advance			
Florian Bacher; Victoria Max-Theurer; Christian Schumach	See above	Team	Eliminated		Did not advance		—N/a		Did not advance	

Qualification Legend: Q = Qualified for the final; q = Qualified for the final as a lucky loser

=== Eventing ===
Katrin Khoddam-Hazrati was forced to withdraw from the Games when her horse Cosma threw a shoe before competing in the dressage.

Athlete	Horse	Event	Dressage		Cross-country			Jumping				Total	
Athlete	Horse	Event	Dressage		Cross-country			Qualifier			Final	Total	
Athlete	Horse	Event	Penalties	Rank	Penalties	Total	Rank	Penalties	Total	Rank	Penalties	Penalties	Rank
Katrin Khoddam-Hazrati	Individual	Cosma	Withdrew										
Lea Siegl	Individual	Fighting Line	32.60	28	2.40	35.00	16	4.00	39.00	17	8.00	47.00	15

== Golf ==
Austria entered two male golfers and one female golfer into the Olympic tournament. Bernd Wiesberger qualified but chose not to play.

Athlete	Event	Round 1	Round 2	Round 3	Round 4	Total		
Athlete	Event	Score	Score	Score	Score	Score	Par	Rank
Matthias Schwab	Men's	69	69	70	67	275	−9	=27
Sepp Straka	Men's	63	71	68	68	270	−14	=10
Christine Wolf	Women's	71	72	81	73	297	+13	56

== Gymnastics ==
=== Artistic ===
Austria entered one artistic gymnast into the Olympic competition. Elisa Hämmerle booked a spot in the women's individual all-around and apparatus events, by finishing eleventh out of the twenty gymnasts eligible for qualification at the 2019 World Championships in Stuttgart, Germany.

Athlete	Event	Qualification						Final					
Athlete	Event	Apparatus				Total	Rank	Apparatus				Total	Rank
Athlete	Event	V	UB	BB	F	Total	Rank	V	UB	BB	F	Total	Rank
Elisa Hämmerle	Women's All-around	12.533	12.600	11.800	12.000	48.933	66	Did not advance					

== Judo ==
Austria entered six judoka (two men and four women) into the Olympic tournament based on the International Judo Federation Olympics Individual Ranking.

Athlete	Event	Round of 64	Round of 32	Round of 16	Quarterfinals	Semifinals	Repechage	Final / BM	
Athlete	Event	Opposition Result	Opposition Result	Opposition Result	Opposition Result	Opposition Result	Opposition Result	Opposition Result	Rank
Shamil Borchashvili	Men's −81 kg	Bye	Egutidze (POR); W 01–00	Muki (ISR); W 01–00	Boltaboev (UZB); W 01–00	Mollaei (MGL); L 00–10	Bye	Ressel (GER); W 10–00	3rd place, bronze medalist(s)
Stephan Hegyi	Men's +100 kg	—N/a	Riner (FRA); L 00–10	Did not advance					
Sabrina Filzmoser	Women's −57 kg	—N/a	Verhagen (NED); L 00–10	Did not advance					
Magdalena Krssakova	Women's −63 kg	—N/a	Yang Jx (CHN); W 10–00	Beauchemin-Pinard (CAN); L 00–10	Did not advance				
Michaela Polleres	Women's −70 kg	—N/a	Fletcher (IRL); W 01–00	Kim S-y (KOR); W 01–00	Matić (CRO); W 01–00	van Dijke (NED); W 01–00	Bye	Arai (JPN); L 00–01	2nd place, silver medalist(s)
Bernadette Graf	Women's −78 kg	—N/a	Ma Zz (CHN); W 10–00	Malonga (FRA); W 00–11	Did not advance				

== Karate ==
Austria entered one karateka into the inaugural Olympic tournament. Bettina Plank competed in the women's kumite 55 kg, qualifying via World Karate Federation continental representation quotas.

Athlete	Event	Group stage					Semifinals	Final	
Athlete	Event	Opposition Result	Opposition Result	Opposition Result	Opposition Result	Rank	Opposition Result	Opposition Result	Rank
Bettina Plank	Women's –55 kg	Miyahara (JPN); L 2–6	Zhangbyrbay (KAZ); W 4–3	Terliuga (UKR); D 0–0	Sayed (EGY); W 3–1	2 Q	Goranova (BUL); L 3–4	Did not advance	3rd place, bronze medalist(s)

== Modern pentathlon ==
Athlete	Event	Fencing (épée one touch)				Swimming (200 m freestyle)			Riding (show jumping)			Combined: shooting/running (10 m air pistol)/(3200 m)			Total points	Final rank
Athlete	Event	RR	BR	Rank	Points	Time	Rank	Points	Time	Rank	Points	Time	Rank	Points	Total points	Final rank
Gustav Gustenau	Men's	18–17	2	14	210	1:56.93	4	317	0	1	300	11:47.97	29	593	1420	16

== Rowing ==
Austria qualified one boat in the women's single sculls for the Games by finishing third in the B-final and securing the last of nine berths available at the 2019 FISA World Championships in Ottensheim, Austria. Meanwhile, the women's lightweight double sculls crew added one boat for the Austrian roster with a third-place finish at the 2021 European Continental Qualification Regatta in Varese, Italy.

Athlete	Event	Heats		Repechage		Quarterfinals		Semifinals		Final	
Athlete	Event	Time	Rank	Time	Rank	Time	Rank	Time	Rank	Time	Rank
Magdalena Lobnig	Women's single sculls	7:37.91	1 QF	Bye		7:58.20	1 SA/B	7:25.59	3 FA	7:19.72	3rd place, bronze medalist(s)
Louisa Altenhuber; Valentina Cavallar	Women's lightweight double sculls	7:26.22	5 R	7:42.31	4 FC	—N/a		Bye		7:15.25	14

Qualification Legend: FA=Final A (medal); FB=Final B (non-medal); FC=Final C (non-medal); FD=Final D (non-medal); FE=Final E (non-medal); FF=Final F (non-medal); SA/B=Semifinals A/B; SC/D=Semifinals C/D; SE/F=Semifinals E/F; QF=Quarterfinals; R=Repechage

== Sailing ==
Austrian sailors qualified one boat in each of the following classes through the 2018 Sailing World Championships, the class-associated Worlds, and the continental regattas.

On March 6, 2020, the Austrian Olympic Committee announced the first set of sailors to compete at the Enoshima regatta, namely Rio 2016 bronze medalist Tanja Frank and her new partner Lorena Abicht in the women's 49erFX class.

Athlete	Event	Race													Net points	Final rank
Athlete	Event	1	2	3	4	5	6	7	8	9	10	11	12	M*	Net points	Final rank
Benjamin Bildstein; David Hussl	Men's 49er	10	~~17~~	6	4	9	9	10	5	16	7	15	13	EL	104	10
Lorena Abicht; Tanja Frank	Women's 49erFX	11	13	9	11	12	~~DNF~~	19	7	9	17	16	20	EL	144	17
Thomas Zajac; Barbara Matz	Mixed Nacra 17	3	10	8	~~14~~	13	5	12	13	9	4	12	11	EL	100	11

M = Medal race; EL = Eliminated – did not advance into the medal race

== Shooting ==
Austrian shooters achieved quota places for the following events by virtue of their best finishes at the 2018 ISSF World Championships, the 2019 ISSF World Cup series, European Championships or Games, and European Qualifying Tournament, as long as they obtained a minimum qualifying score (MQS) by 31 May 2020.

Athlete	Event	Qualification		Final	
Athlete	Event	Points	Rank	Points	Rank
Martin Strempfl	Men's 10 m air rifle	627.0	13	Did not advance	
Sylvia Steiner	Women's 10 m air pistol	573	15	Did not advance	
Sylvia Steiner	Women's 25 m pistol	577	29	Did not advance	

== Skateboarding ==
Austria entered one skateboarder into the Olympic tournament

Athlete	Event	Qualification		Final	
Athlete	Event	Result	Rank	Result	Rank
Julia Brückler	Women's street	5.10	18	Did not advance	

== Sport climbing ==
Austria entered two sport climbers into the Olympic tournament. Jakob Schubert and Jessica Pilz qualified directly each for the men's and women's combined event, by advancing to the final stage and securing one of the seven provisional berths at the 2019 IFSC World Championships in Hachioji, Japan.

Athlete	Event	Qualification									Final								
Athlete	Event	Speed		Boulder		Lead			Total	Rank	Speed		Boulder		Lead			Total	Rank
Athlete	Event	Best	Place	Result	Place	Hold	Time	Place	Total	Rank	Best	Place	Result	Place	Hold	Time	Place	Total	Rank
Jakob Schubert	Men's	6.70	12	1T3z 2 13	7	412+	4:02	1	84.00	4 Q	6.76	7	1T3z 1 7	5	Top	–	1	35	3rd place, bronze medalist(s)
Jessica Pilz	Women's	8.51	11	1T3z 3 5	9	33+	–	2	198.00	6 Q	8.43	6	0T2z 0 10	5	34+	–	3	90	7

== Swimming ==
Austrian swimmers further achieved qualifying standards in the following events (up to a maximum of 2 swimmers in each event at the Olympic Qualifying Time (OQT), and potentially 1 at the Olympic Selection Time (OST)):

Men

Athlete	Event	Heat		Semifinal		Final	
Athlete	Event	Time	Rank	Time	Rank	Time	Rank
Felix Auböck	400 m freestyle	3:43.91	2 Q	—N/a		3:44.07	4
Felix Auböck	800 m freestyle	7:45.73 NR	4 Q	—N/a		7:49.14	7
Felix Auböck	1500 m freestyle	14:51.88	7 Q	—N/a		15:03.47	7
Simon Bucher	100 m butterfly	52.52	=37	Did not advance			
Heiko Gigler	50 m freestyle	22.17	22	Did not advance			
Bernhard Reitshammer	100 m backstroke	55.26	35	Did not advance			
Bernhard Reitshammer	100 m breaststroke	1:00.41	30	Did not advance			
Bernhard Reitshammer	200 m individual medley	1:59.56	32	Did not advance			
Christopher Rothbauer	200 m breaststroke	2:13.19	28	Did not advance			

Women

Athlete	Event	Heat		Semifinal		Final	
Athlete	Event	Time	Rank	Time	Rank	Time	Rank
Lena Grabowski	100 m backstroke	1:01.80	29	Did not advance			
Lena Grabowski	200 m backstroke	2:09.77	10 Q	2:10.10	12	Did not advance	
Marlene Kahler	400 m freestyle	4:08.37	17	—N/a		Did not advance	
Marlene Kahler	800 m freestyle	8:36.16	22	—N/a		Did not advance	
Marlene Kahler	1500 m freestyle	16:20.05	19	—N/a		Did not advance	

== Table tennis ==
Austria entered five athletes into the table tennis competition at the Games. The women's team secured a berth by advancing to the quarterfinal round of the 2020 World Olympic Qualification Event in Gondomar, Portugal, permitting a maximum of two starters to compete in the women's singles tournament. Moreover, an additional place was awarded to the Austrian table tennis players competing in the inaugural mixed doubles by virtue of a top six national finish vying for qualification in the ITTF Olympic Rankings.

Two-time Olympian Robert Gardos and Daniel Habesohn were automatically selected among the top seven eligible players in the men's singles based on the ITTF Olympic Rankings of June 1, 2021.

Athlete	Event	Preliminary	Round 1	Round 2	Round 3	Round of 16	Quarterfinals	Semifinals	Final / BM	
Athlete	Event	Opposition Result	Opposition Result	Opposition Result	Opposition Result	Opposition Result	Opposition Result	Opposition Result	Opposition Result	Rank
Robert Gardos	Men's singles	Bye		Drinkhall (GBR); L 1–4	Did not advance					
Daniel Habesohn	Men's singles	Bye		Chew (SGP); W 4–1	Freitas (POR); L 3–4	Did not advance				
Liu Jia	Women's singles	Zaza (SYR); W 4–0	Gaponova (UKR); W 4–2	Mikhaylova (ROC); W 4–3	Díaz (PUR); W 4–0	Jeon J-h (KOR); L 1–4	Did not advance			
Sofia Polcanova	Women's singles	Bye			Batra (IND); W 4–0	Ishikawa (JPN); L 0–4	Did not advance			
Liu Jia; Liu Yuan; Sofia Polcanova	Women's team	—N/a				China; L 0–3	Did not advance			
Stefan Fegerl; Sofia Polcanova	Mixed doubles	—N/a				Mizutani / Ito (JPN); L 1–4	Did not advance			

== Tennis ==
Athlete	Event	Round of 32	Round of 16	Quarterfinals	Semifinals	Final / BM	
Athlete	Event	Opposition Score	Opposition Score	Opposition Score	Opposition Score	Opposition Score	Rank
Oliver Marach; Philipp Oswald	Men's doubles	Millman / Saville (AUS); W 7–5, 6–2	Cabal / Farah (COL); L 4–6, 1–6	Did not advance			

== Triathlon ==
Individual

Athlete	Event	Time						Rank
Athlete	Event	Swim (1.5 km)	Trans 1	Bike (40 km)	Trans 2	Run (10 km)	Total	Rank
Alois Knabl	Men's	17:55	0:45	Did not finish				
Lukas Hollaus	Men's	18:38	0:40	57:38	0:29	31:34	1:48:59	34
Julia Hauser	Women's	Did not finish						
Lisa Perterer	Women's	20:03	0:42	1:06:14	0:35	35:26	2:03:00	27

== Weightlifting ==
Austrian weightlifters qualified for two quota places at the games, based on the Tokyo 2020 Rankings Qualification List of 11 June 2021.

Athlete	Event	Snatch		Clean & jerk		Total	Rank
Athlete	Event	Result	Rank	Result	Rank	Total	Rank
Sargis Martirosjan	Men's +109 kg	180	6	201	12	381	10
Sarah Fischer	Women's +87 kg	97	9	123	11	220	10

== See also ==
- Austria at the 2020 Summer Paralympics
