= Dressage at the 2020 Summer Olympics =

Dressage at the 2020 Summer Olympics, which took place in 2021, may refer to either of two events:

- Equestrian at the 2020 Summer Olympics – Individual dressage
- Equestrian at the 2020 Summer Olympics – Team dressage
