= Schopf (surname) =

Schopf is a surname. Notable people with the surname include:

- Alessandro Schöpf (born 1994), Austrian footballer
- Andreas Schopf (born 1984), Austrian luger
- Carrie Schopf (born 1957), Armenian horse rider
- Christian Schopf (born 1983), Austrian luger
- Daniel Schöpf (born 1990), Austrian footballer
- Thomas Schopf (born 1989), Austrian luger
- Wolfgang Schopf (born 1988), Austrian luger
- J. William Schopf (born 1941), American paleontologist
