= Table tennis at the 2020 Summer Olympics – Women's team =

Table tennis – women's team at the Games of the XXXII Olympiad
- Venue: Tokyo Metropolitan Gymnasium
- Date: 1–5 August 2021
- Competitors: 48 from 16 nations
- Teams: 16

Medalists
1st place, gold medalist(s)		Chen Meng; Sun Yingsha; Wang Manyu	China
2nd place, silver medalist(s)		Mima Ito; Kasumi Ishikawa; Miu Hirano	Japan
3rd place, bronze medalist(s)		Doo Hoi Kem; Lee Ho Ching; Minnie Soo Wai Yam	Hong Kong

The women's team table tennis event was part of the table tennis programme at the 2020 Summer Olympics in Tokyo. The event took place from 1 August to 5 August 2021 at Tokyo Metropolitan Gymnasium.

== Format ==
Teams were made up of three players. Each team match was made up of five individual matches and ended when either side has won three matches. The order of a team match was changed as follows: a doubles match, two singles matches, and if neither side had won three matches by this point, a maximum of two extra singles matches were played. The new order avoids any players playing two matches in succession, and forces players who play two singles to compete in the second individual match.

Order of a team match
		ABC team	vs	XYZ team
1	Doubles	B + C	vs	Y + Z
2	Singles	A	vs	X
3	Singles	C	vs	Z
4	Singles	A	vs	Y
5	Singles	B	vs	X

== Schedule ==
Legend
P	Preliminary round	¼	Quarter-finals	½	Semi-finals	F	Final

Sun 1	Mon 2		Tue 3		Wed 4	Thu 5
P	P	¼	¼	½	½	F

== Seeds ==
The women’s team Olympic qualification rankings published in July 2021 was used for seeding purposes. The results of the draw are announced on 21 July at the Tokyo Metropolitan Gymnasium. Each team is eligible to nominate one reserve player to the Tokyo Games to replace a team member who is injured or has an illness.

Rank	Team	Athletes (world ranking in July 2021)			Reserve
1	China	Chen Meng (1)	Sun Yingsha (2)	Liu Shiwen (7)	Wang Manyu (4, replaced Liu)
2	Japan	Mima Ito (3)	Kasumi Ishikawa (9)	Miu Hirano (12)	Hina Hayata (25)
3	Germany	Petrissa Solja (19)	Han Ying (21)	Shan Xiaona (32)	Nina Mittelham (44)
4	Hong Kong	Doo Hoi Kem (15)	Minnie Soo Wai Yam (30)	Lee Ho Ching (46)	Zhu Chengzhu (93)
5	Chinese Taipei	Cheng I-ching (8)	Chen Szu-yu (26)	Cheng Hsien-tzu (58)	Liu Hsing-yin (88)
6	Singapore	Feng Tianwei (11)	Yu Mengyu (45)	Lin Ye (60)	
7	South Korea	Jeon Ji-hee (14)	Choi Hyo-joo (64)	Shin Yu-bin (77)	Lee Zi-on (98)
8	Romania	Bernadette Szőcs (27)	Elizabeta Samara (28)	Daniela Dodean (107)	Irina Ciobanu (122)
9	United States	Lily Zhang (31)	Juan Liu (450)	Huijing Wang (892)	Wang Chen (533)
10	Hungary	Georgina Póta (53)	Dóra Madarász (65)	Szandra Pergel (79)	Mária Fazekas (replaced Póta)
11	Poland	Li Qian (50)	Natalia Partyka (83)	Natalia Bajor (96)	
12	Austria	Sofia Polcanova (17)	Liu Jia (140)	Liu Yuan (302)	Karoline Mischek (147)
13	France	Jia Nan Yuan (82)	Stephanie Loeuillette (95)	Prithika Pavade (234)	
14	Egypt	Dina Meshref (34)	Yousra Helmy (96)	Farah Abdelaziz (141)	Hana Goda (910)
15	Brazil	Bruna Takahashi (41)	Jessica Yamada (142)	Caroline Kumahara (145)	Giulia Takahashi (841)
16	Australia	Jian Fang Lay (156)	Melissa Tapper (172)	Michelle Bromley (209)	

== Bracket ==
First round
1	China	3
12	Austria	0
13	France	0
6	Singapore	3
7	South Korea	3
11	Poland	0
16	Australia	0
3	Germany	3
4	Hong Kong	3
15	Brazil	1
14	Egypt	0
8	Romania	3
5	Chinese Taipei	3
9	United States	0
10	Hungary	0
2	Japan	3

Quarterfinals
1	China	3
6	Singapore	0
7	South Korea	2
3	Germany	3
4	Hong Kong	3
8	Romania	1
5	Chinese Taipei	0
2	Japan	3

Semifinals
1	China	3
3	Germany	0
4	Hong Kong	0
2	Japan	3

Gold medal match
1	China	3
2	Japan	0
Bronze medal match
3	Germany	1
4	Hong Kong	3

== Results ==
=== First round ===
1 August; 14:30	China	3–0	Austria	Duration: 59min

	Individual matches
Sun Yingsha / Wang Manyu	3–0	Liu Jia / Liu Yuan	11–4, 11–6, 11–4
Chen Meng	3–0	Sofia Polcanova	11–3, 11–3, 11–6
Wang Manyu	3–0	Liu Yuan	11–2, 11–2, 11–3

2 August; 10:00	France	0–3	Singapore	Duration: 1h 46min

	Individual matches
Stéphanie Loeuillette / Jia Nan Yuan	0–3	Lin Ye / Yu Mengyu	6–11, 5–11, 11–13
Prithika Pavade	2–3	Feng Tianwei	11–8, 11–6, 3–11, 8–11, 3–11
Jia Nan Yuan	1–3	Yu Mengyu	8–11, 11–7, 5–11, 8–11

2 August; 10:00	South Korea	3–0	Poland	Duration: 2h 4min

	Individual matches
Choi Hyo-joo / Shin Yubin	3–2	Natalia Partyka / Natalia Bajor	11–6, 12–10, 11–13, 4–11, 13–11
Jeon Ji-hee	3–0	Li Qian	11–4, 11–8, 11–3
Shin Yubin	3–2	Natalia Bajor	11–4, 11–7, 9–11, 8–11, 11–5

1 August; 14:30	Australia	0–3	Germany	Duration: 1h 25min

	Individual matches
Melissa Tapper / Michelle Bromley	0–3	Petrissa Solja / Shan Xiaona	1–11, 5–11, 4–11
Jian Fang Lay	2–3	Han Ying	11–13, 11–9, 4–11, 11–7, 2–11
Michelle Bromley	0–3	Shan Xiaona	2–11, 3–11, 9–11

1 August; 12:00	Hong Kong	3–1	Brazil	Duration: 2h 29min

	Individual matches
Minnie Soo Wai Yam / Lee Ho Ching	3–0	Jessica Yamada / Caroline Kumahara	11–9, 11–8, 11–9
Doo Hoi Kem	3–0	Bruna Takahashi	11–3, 14–12, 11–7
Lee Ho Ching	2–3	Caroline Kumahara	8–11, 9–11, 11–5, 11–9, 6–11
Doo Hoi Kem	3–1	Jessica Yamada	11–5, 9–11, 11–5, 12–10

1 August; 10:00	Egypt	0–3	Romania	Duration: 1h 39min

	Individual matches
Yousra Abdel Razek / Farah Abdelaziz	0–3	Daniela Dodean / Elizabeta Samara	8–11, 11–13, 6–11
Dina Meshref	2–3	Bernadette Szőcs	12–10, 11–9, 6–11, 7–11, 7–11
Farah Abdelaziz	1–3	Elizabeta Samara	4–11, 11–9, 9–11, 8–11

1 August; 19:40	Chinese Taipei	3–0	United States	Duration: 1h 43min

	Individual matches
Cheng Hsien-tzu / Chen Szu-yu	3–2	Lily Zhang / Juan Liu	11–6, 6–11, 6–11, 12–10, 11–8
Cheng I-ching	3–0	Huijing Wang	11–5, 11–1, 11–4
Chen Szu-yu	3–1	Juan Liu	11–13, 11–4, 16–14, 11–4

1 August; 19:40	Hungary	0–3	Japan	Duration: 1h 13min

	Individual matches
Mária Fazekas / Szandra Pergel	0–3	Kasumi Ishikawa / Miu Hirano	7–11, 7–11, 8–11
Dóra Madarász	0–3	Mima Ito	2–11, 6–11, 6–11
Szandra Pergel	0–3	Miu Hirano	3–11, 5–11, 7–11

=== Quarterfinals ===
3 August; 14:30	China	3–0	Singapore	Duration: 1h 34min

	Individual matches
Chen Meng / Wang Manyu	3–0	Yu Mengyu / Lin Ye	11–5, 11–7, 11–5
Sun Yingsha	3–0	Feng Tianwei	11–8, 11–3, 11–8
Wang Manyu	3–1	Lin Ye	6–11, 11–9, 11–6, 11–5

3 August; 10:00	South Korea	2–3	Germany	Duration: 3h 14min

	Individual matches
Shin Yubin / Jeon Ji-hee	3–2	Shan Xiaona / Petrissa Solja	9–11, 11–8, 6–11, 11–6, 11–3
Choi Hyo-joo	0–3	Han Ying	3–11, 3–11, 8–11
Jeon Ji-hee	3–0	Petrissa Solja	11–6, 13–11, 11–3
Shin Yubin	1–3	Han Ying	6–11, 12–10, 6–11, 9–11
Choi Hyo-joo	0–3	Shan Xiaona	8–11, 6–11, 9–11

2 August; 14:30	Hong Kong	3–1	Romania	Duration: 2h 17min

	Individual matches
Minnie Soo Wai Yam / Lee Ho Ching	2–3	Daniela Dodean / Elizabeta Samara	5–11, 11–5, 7–11, 11–6, 11–13
Doo Hoi Kem	3–0	Bernadette Szőcs	11–5, 11–5, 11–6
Lee Ho Ching	3–0	Elizabeta Samara	11–9, 11–8, 12–10
Doo Hoi Kem	3–0	Daniela Dodean	11–3, 11–2, 14–12

2 August; 19:30	Chinese Taipei	0–3	Japan	Duration: 1h 34min

	Individual matches
Cheng Hsien-tzu / Chen Szu-yu	0–3	Kasumi Ishikawa / Miu Hirano	8–11, 6–11, 5–11
Cheng I-ching	0–3	Mima Ito	2–11, 9–11, 8–11
Chen Szu-yu	1–3	Miu Hirano	9–11, 11–7, 4–11, 4–11

=== Semifinals ===
4 August; 10:00	China	3–0	Germany	Duration: 1h 35min

	Individual matches
Wang Manyu / Chen Meng	3–0	Shan Xiaona / Petrissa Solja	11–9, 11–2, 11–4
Sun Yingsha	3–0	Han Ying	11–6, 11–4, 11–9
Chen Meng	3–1	Petrissa Solja	5–11, 11—4, 11–9, 13–11

3 August; 19:30	Hong Kong	0–3	Japan	Duration: 1h 44min

	Individual matches
Minnie Soo Wai Yam / Lee Ho Ching	0–3	Kasumi Ishikawa / Miu Hirano	7–11, 2–11, 8–11
Doo Hoi Kem	1–3	Mima Ito	9–11, 11–9, 1–11, 7–11
Lee Ho Ching	0–3	Miu Hirano	10–12, 7–11, 3–11

=== Bronze medal match ===
5 August; 11:00	Germany	1–3	Hong Kong	Duration: 2h 30min

	Individual matches
Shan Xiaona / Petrissa Solja	3–1	Lee Ho Ching / Doo Hoi Kem	8–11, 11–5, 11–7, 15–13
Han Ying	1–3	Minnie Soo Wai Yam	10–12, 11–9, 9–11, 7–11
Petrissa Solja	0–3	Doo Hoi Kem	5–11, 6–11, 9–11
Shan Xiaona	0–3	Minnie Soo Wai Yam	10–12, 11–13, 7–11

=== Gold medal match ===
5 August; 19:30	China	3–0	Japan	Duration: 1h 59min

	Individual matches
Chen Meng / Wang Manyu	3–1	Kasumi Ishikawa / Miu Hirano	9–11, 11–6, 11–8, 11–7
Sun Yingsha	3–1	Mima Ito	11–8, 11–5, 3–11, 11–3
Wang Manyu	3–0	Miu Hirano	11–5, 11–9, 11–3
