= Eyal Zlatin =

Israeli dressage rider

Personal information
- Native name: אייל זלטין
- Born: March 17, 1987 (age 38); Ein Harod, Israel

Sport
- Country: Israel
- Sport: Equestrian
- Club: RFV Griedel: Germany
- Coached by: Wolfram Wittig

Achievements and titles
- Regional finals: 2019 FEI European Championships

Eyal Zlatin (Hebrew: אייל זלטין; born 9 March 1987 in Ein Harod, Israel) is an Israeli dressage rider.

Eyal Zlatin competed at the 2019 FEI European Championships representing Israel, finished 43rd. In 2018 he was qualified as individual for the 2018 World Equestrian Games, but did not compete. Zlatin was part of the Israeli team that finished fourth during the Nations Cup in Wellington, Florida. He is based in Germany where he runs his own equestrian business. His trainers include Klaus Balkenhol and Ferdi Eilberg.
