= Oksana Gusarova =

Ukrainian equestrian

Personal information
- Born: June 18, 1970 (age 56) Kiyiv, Soviet Union

Oksana Gusarova (born 18 June 1970 in Kiyiv, Soviet Union) is a Ukrainian dressage rider. Representing Ukraine, she competed at two European Dressage Championships in 2017 and 2019. During the 2019 FEI European Championships, she competed as individual for her country.
