= Liu Yuan (table tennis) =

Austrian table tennis player

Personal information
- Nationality: Austrian
- Born: 7 September 1985 (age 39)

Sport
- Sport: Table tennis

Liu Yuan (born 7 September 1985) is an Austrian table tennis player. She competed in the women's team event at the 2020 Summer Olympics.

She was born in China, emigrated to Italy, and in 2005 she emigrated to Austria.
