= Carrie Schopf =

American-born Armenian dressage rider (born 1957)

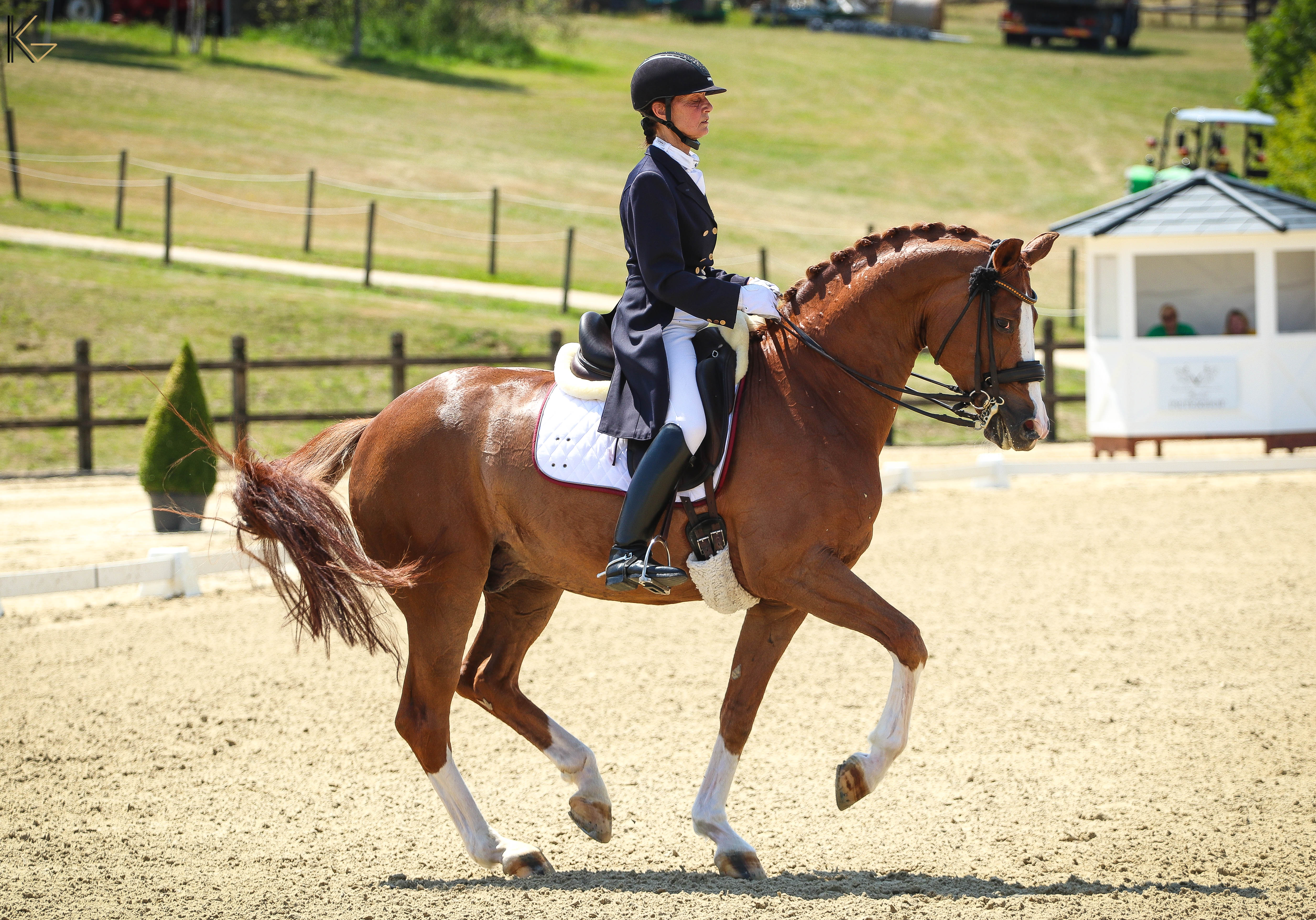
- Carrie Schopf and Saumur in 2019

Personal information
- Full name: Carrie Schopf
- Nationality: Armenian, American
- Born: April 13, 1957 (age 69)

Sport
- Country: Armenia
- Sport: Equestrian
- Coached by: Christoph Koschel

Carrie Schopf (Armenian: Քերի Շոպֆ; born April 13, 1957) is an American-born Armenian dressage rider. She became the first Armenian equestrian ever to compete at an FEI-level championship.

== Biography ==
Schopf was introduced to dressage while studying at the University of Southern California in Los Angeles. Born in the United States, she has competed internationally for her native country, as well as both Germany and Armenia. Both Schopf's maternal and fraternal grandparents fled Armenia during the Armenian genocide of the early twentieth century. Her maternal grandparents sought refuge in Beirut, while her fraternal grandparents sought refuge in the US by way of Azerbaijan and Georgia. She is married to German businessman and dressage rider Bernd Schopf, and divides her time between Bremen and Wellington, Florida.

Schopf competed at the 2019 European Championships in Rotterdam, where she placed 58th in the individual competition aboard her horse Saumur. In doing so, she became the first Armenian representative at any FEI-level equestrian championships.
