= Estelle Wettstein =

Swiss equestrian

Personal information
- Full name: Estelle Wettstein
- Nationality: Switzerland
- Discipline: Dressage
- Born: December 2, 1996 (age 28); Uster, Switzerland
- Home town: Wermatswil, Switzerland
Medal record
Equestrian
Representing Switzerland
European Junior Championships
Gold medal – first place	2013 Vejer de la Frontera	Team jumping

Estelle Wettstein (born December 2, 1996) is a Swiss athlete in dressage and show-jumping. She competed at the 2018 World Equestrian Games and was the youngest rider during the 2019 FEI European Championships in Rotterdam.

Estelle represented her country on the Olympic Games in Tokyo, finishing 41st in the individual competition.
