= Wang Huijing =

American table tennis player

Personal information
- Nationality: American
- Born: April 19, 1980 (age 44); Tianjin, China
- Home town: Sugar Land, Texas, U.S.
- Height: 5 ft 4 in (163 cm)

Sport
- Country: United States
- Sport: Table tennis

Wang Huijing (born April 19, 1980) is an American table tennis player. She qualified to represent Team USA in the 2020 Tokyo Summer Olympics.
