= Morgan Barbançon =

French-Spanish equestrian

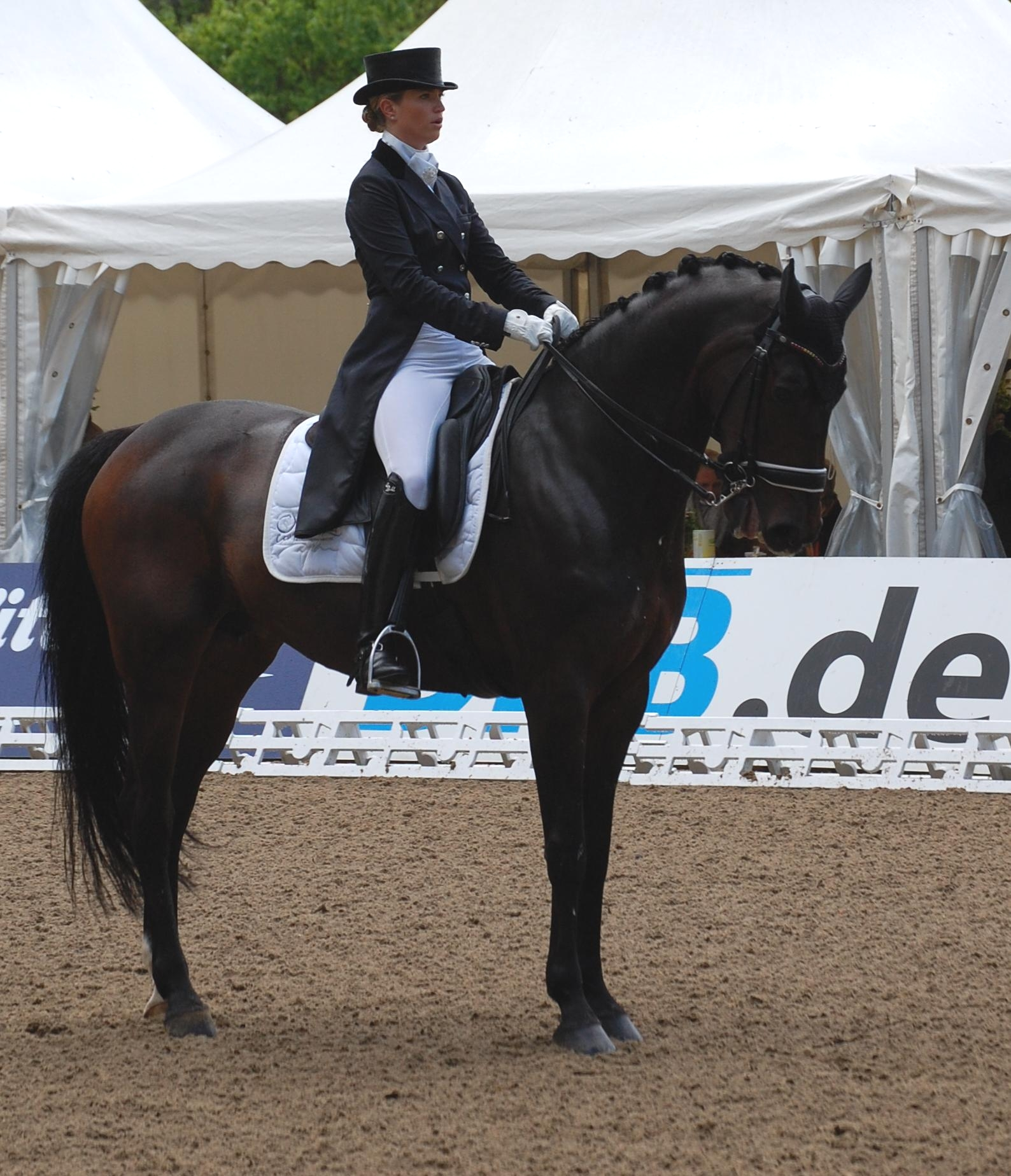
- Barbançon Mestre and Vitana V (2015)

Personal information
- Nickname: Mushu
- Nationality: French, Spanish
- Born: Morgan Barbançon Mestre; 12 August 1992 (age 34) Paris, France

Sport
- Country: France
- Sport: Equestrian
- Coached by: Dorothee Schneider

Morgan Barbançon Mestre (born 12 August 1992 in Paris, France) is a French and Spanish Olympic dressage rider. Representing Spain, she competed at the 2012 Summer Olympics in London where she finished 7th in team competition and 23rd in the individual competition.

Barbançon competed at the 2014 World Equestrian Games in Normandy, France, where she finished 5th in team dressage, 15th in special dressage and 15th in freestyle dressage competition. She also competed at the 2015 FEI World Cup Finals in Las Vegas, Nevada, where she finished 8th.

She competes for France since May 2018.

== Biography ==
Morgan started riding at the age of three in Switzerland and started dressage at the age of 10. Morgan competed successfully in the youth division and competed at several European Championships for Ponies and Juniors. In 2012 she competed at the age of 20 at the Olympic Games in London under the vision of triple Olympic gold-medalist Anky van Grunsven. After eight years living in The Netherlands, she returned to Switzerland in 2018. In recent years she has competed several horses at Grand Prix level, including Painted Black, Sir Donnerhall II OLD, Girasol, Bolero, Vitana V, Heimliche Liebe, Don Lorean and Black Pearl.

=== Suspension ===
In 2024, Barbançon Mestre was shortlisted for the French national team in consideration for the summer Olympic Games. She was later suspended from the team when she failed to comply with France's anti-doping agency to report her whereabouts for out-of-competition drug testing. She claimed the lack of compliance was due to technical issues, but the organization dismissed the appeal and extended her suspension to 18 months.

== Personal life ==
Morgan Barbancon is born to a French father and a Spanish mother. Her younger sister Alexandra Barbancon competes also in international dressage. She is fluent in French, English, Spanish, Catalan, Dutch and German.

== Dressage results ==
=== Olympic Games ===
| Event | Team | Individual | Freestyle | Horse |
|---|---|---|---|---|
| (United Kingdom) London 2012 | 7th | 23rd | — | Painted Black |
| (Japan) Tokyo 2020 | 9th | 24th | — | Sir Donnerhall II |

=== World Championships ===
| Event | Team | Individual | Freestyle | Horse |
|---|---|---|---|---|
| (France) 2014 Caen | 5th | 15th | 15th | Painted Black |
| (Denmark) 2022 Herning | 12th | 32nd | - | Sir Donnerhall II OLD |

=== European Championships ===
| Event | Team | Individual | Freestyle | Horse |
|---|---|---|---|---|
| (Germany) 2015 Aachen | 4th | 14th | 12th | Painted Black |
| (Netherlands) 2019 Rotterdam | 10th | 27th | - | Sir Donnerhall II |
| (Germany) 2021 Hagen | 9th | 23rd | - | Sir Donnerhall II |
| (Germany) 2023 Riesenbeck | 19th | 16th | 14th | Habana Libre A |

=== World Cup ===
==== Final ====
| Event | Score | Rank | Horse |
|---|---|---|---|
| (United States) 2015 Las Vegas | 76.161% | 8th | Painted Black |
| (France) 2018 Paris | 76.4208% | 10th | Sir Donnerhall II |
| (Sweden) 2019 Gothenburg | 74.511% | 14th | Sir Donnerhall II |
| (Germany) 2022 Leipzig | 76.986% | 7th | Sir Donnerhall II OLD |
| (United States) 2023 Omaha | 74.814% | 10th | Sir Donnerhall II OLD |
| (Saudi Arabia) 2024 Riyadh | 75.337% | 7th | Sir Donnerhall II OLD |

=== Youth Dressage European Championship ===
==== Final ====
| Event | Score | Rank | Horse |
|---|---|---|---|
| (Germany) 2007 Freudenberg | 67.350% | 12th | Discus 7 |
| (Netherlands) 2009 Ermelo | - | 52nd | Ahorn |
| (Germany) 2011 Kronberg | - | 7th | Dankeschön |
