= Jessica von Bredow-Werndl =

German dressage rider

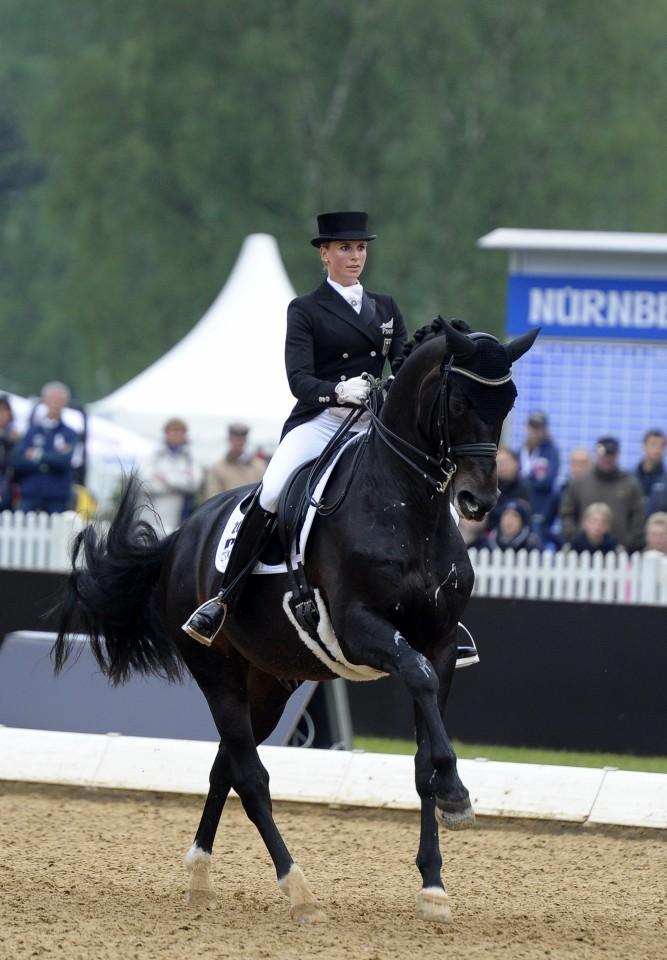
- Von Bredow-Werndl riding Unee BB

Personal information
- Born: 16 February 1986 (age 40) Rosenheim, Germany
Medal record
Equestrian
Representing Germany
Olympic Games
Gold medal – first place	2020 Tokyo	Team dressage
Gold medal – first place	2020 Tokyo	Individual dressage
Gold medal – first place	2024 Paris	Team dressage
Gold medal – first place	2024 Paris	Individual dressage
World Championships
Gold medal – first place	2018 Tryon	Team dressage
European Championships
Gold medal – first place	2019 Rotterdam	Team dressage
Gold medal – first place	2021 Hagen	Team dressage
Gold medal – first place	2021 Hagen	Special dressage
Gold medal – first place	2021 Hagen	Freestyle dressage
Gold medal – first place	2023 Riesenbeck	Special dressage
Gold medal – first place	2023 Riesenbeck	Freestyle dressage
Silver medal – second place	2023 Riesenbeck	Team dressage
Bronze medal – third place	2015 Aachen	Team dressage
Bronze medal – third place	2019 Rotterdam	Freestyle dressage
World Cup
Gold medal – first place	2022 Leipzig	Individual dressage
Gold medal – first place	2023 Omaha	Individual dressage
Bronze medal – third place	2015 Las Vegas	Individual dressage
Bronze medal – third place	2016 Göteborg	Individual dressage
Bronze medal – third place	2018 Paris	Individual dressage
European Young Riders Championships
Gold medal – first place	2004 Aarhus	Individual dressage
Silver medal – second place	2004 Aarhus	Team dressage

Jessica von Bredow-Werndl (born 16 February 1986 in Rosenheim) is a German Olympic dressage rider.

== Career ==
Von Bredow-Werndl began riding at the age of four. Von Bredow-Werndl received her first horse at the age of seven, a Lewitzer pony named Little Girl. Paul Elzenbaumer was the first trainer for Jessica and her brother Benjamin. From 1995 to 2007, Stephan Münch helped them proceed from E level to Grand Prix.

In 1998 and 1999, Von Bredow-Werndl and her horse Nino the Champ qualified for the finals at the German Bundeschampion in Warendorf. At the age of 15, when she transitioned to riding larger horses she qualified for the top three at the Preis der Besten in Waredorf. She competed with a horse named Nokturn.

One year later in 2002, she went to the European championships. The horses Bonito and Duchess helped her achieve six gold and two silver medals in just three years. In that time, she also managed to win three German national titles. By 2006 she had worked her way up to the Grand Prix level.

Jessica and Benjamin decided to establish themselves at the Grand Prix level with the young horses that they trained themselves. They were assisted by Isabell Werth. In the five years that she assisted the siblings, she brought them together with Jonny Hilberath. They began working with him in 2011. They also work with Andreas Hausberger, a head rider of the Spanish riding school in Vienna.

In 2012, Von Bredow-Werndl began working with Unee, a black stallion. They have developed significantly since their first success in regional tournaments. Since then, they have made their way onto the international scene and have begun to gain attention.

Von Bredow-Werndl qualified for the 2014 Dressage World Cup Final in Lyon after finishing fourth in the Western European League rankings. She won the Western European League qualifying stage in Gothenburg during the 2013/2014 season. At the finals held in Lyon's expo center she finished seventh.

Von Bredow-Werndl also competed at the following World Cup finals in 2015 in Las Vegas, Nevada. This time she finished third, getting a podium, scoring above 80%. Von Bredow-Werndl successfully defended her third-place finish at the next edition of the World Cup Final in 2016.

She was selected to be a part of the German team at the 2015 European Dressage Championships where she won a bronze medal in the team competition and finished seventh in the freestyle competition.

Jessica became the individual Olympic Champion during the 2020 Summer Olympics in Tokyo with her mare Dalera, scoring 91.732% in the individual freestyle. She also earned the gold team medal with Isabell Werth and Dorothee Schneider.

She also won Individual gold during the 2024 Summer Olympics in Paris, riding TSF Dalera BB, and Team gold alongside Isabell Werth and Frederic Wandres.

== Personal bests ==
	Score	Horse	Date
Grand Prix	84.612	TSF Dalera BB	07 September 2023
Grand Prix Special	85.593	TSF Dalera BB	08 September 2023
Grand Prix Freestyle	92.818	TSF Dalera BB	10 September 2023

== International championship results ==
Year	Event	Horse	Score	Placing	Notes
2004	European Young Rider Championships	Bonito		2nd place, silver medalist(s)	Team
2004	European Young Rider Championships	Bonito		1st place, gold medalist(s)	Individual
2014	World Cup Final	Unee BB	77.768%	7th	
2015	World Cup Final	Unee BB	80.464%	3rd place, bronze medalist(s)	
2015	European Championships	Unee BB	75.200%	3rd place, bronze medalist(s)	Team
2015	European Championships	Unee BB	74.790%	8th	Individual Special
2015	European Championships	Unee BB	80.214%	7th	Individual Freestyle
2016	World Cup Final	Unee BB	80.464%	3rd place, bronze medalist(s)	
2018	World Cup Final	Unee BB	83.725%	3rd place, bronze medalist(s)	
2018	World Equestrian Games	TSF Dalera BB	76.677%	1st place, gold medalist(s)	Team
2018	World Equestrian Games	TSF Dalera BB	73.875%	16th	Individual Special
2019	European Championships	TSF Dalera BB	76.894%	1st place, gold medalist(s)	Team
2019	European Championships	TSF Dalera BB	78.541%	4th	Individual Special
2019	European Championships	TSF Dalera BB	89.107%	3rd place, bronze medalist(s)	Individual Freestyle
2021	Tokyo 2021 Olympic Games	TSF Dalera BB	84.666%	1st place, gold medalist(s)	Team
2021	Tokyo 2021 Olympic Games	TSF Dalera BB	91.732%	1st place, gold medalist(s)	Individual Freestyle
2021	European Championships	TSF Dalera BB	84.099%	1st place, gold medalist(s)	Team
2021	European Championships	TSF Dalera BB	84.271%	1st place, gold medalist(s)	Individual Special
2021	European Championships	TSF Dalera BB	91.021%	1st place, gold medalist(s)	Individual Freestyle
2022	World Cup Final	TSF Dalera BB	90.836%	1st place, gold medalist(s)	
2023	World Cup Final	TSF Dalera BB	90.482%	1st place, gold medalist(s)	
2023	European Championships	TSF Dalera BB	84.612%	2nd place, silver medalist(s)	Team
2023	European Championships	TSF Dalera BB	85.593%	1st place, gold medalist(s)	Individual Special
2023	European Championships	TSF Dalera BB	92.818%	1st place, gold medalist(s)	Individual Freestyle
2024	Paris 2024 Olympic Games	TSF Dalera BB	79.954%	1st place, gold medalist(s)	Team
2024	Paris 2024 Olympic Games	TSF Dalera BB	90.093%	1st place, gold medalist(s)	Individual Freestyle
