= Anne Meulendijks =

Dutch dressage rider (born 1993)

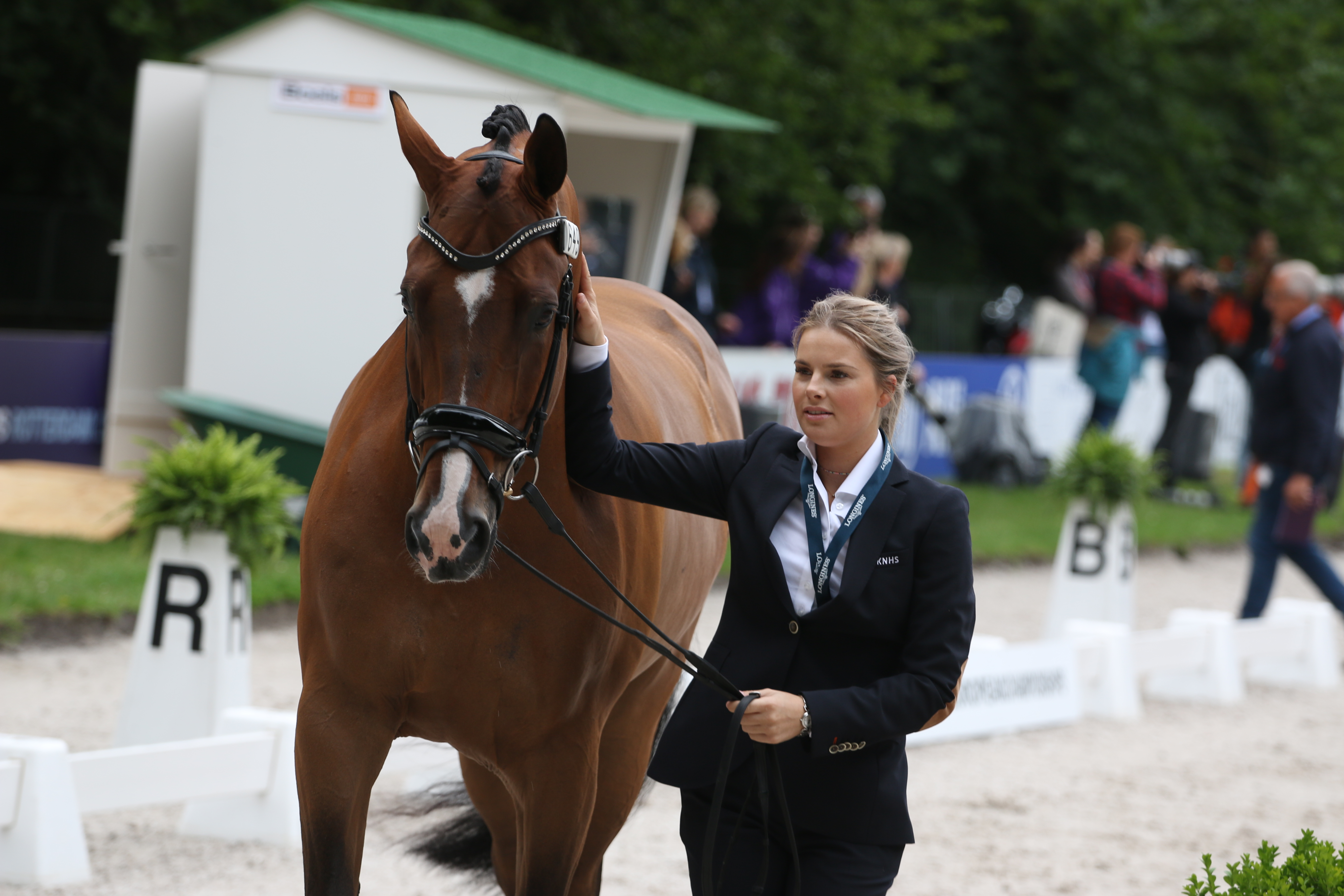

Personal information
- Nationality: Dutch
- Born: 30 July 1993 (age 32) Heeze, Netherlands
- Website: mdhsporthorses.com/en/home-2

Sport
- Country: Netherlands
- Sport: Equestrian
- Coached by: Sjef Janssen
Medal record
Equestrian
Representing the Netherlands
European Championships
Silver medal – second place	2019 Rotterdam	Team dressage

Anne Meulendijks (born 30 July 1993) is a Dutch dressage rider. She won team silver during the 2019 European Championships in Rotterdam with her horse MDH Avanti. She also won several medals at the European Youth Championships in the Ponies, Juniors, Young Riders and U25 division.

== Biography ==
Meulendijks was born in Heeze in the Dutch province North Brabant. Together with her younger sister Lotte Meulendijks they run their own dressage stable in Heeze.
