= Laurence Roos =

Belgian dressage rider (born 1993)

Personal information
- Full name: Laurence Roos
- Nationality: Belgian
- Born: 26 December 1993 (age 32) Lichtaart, Belgium

Sport
- Country: Belgium
- Sport: Equestrian

Achievements and titles
- World finals: 2018 World Equestrian Games
- Regional finals: 2017 European Championships; 2019 European Championships

Laurence Roos (born 26 December 1993) is a Belgian dressage rider. She competed at the 2018 World Equestrian Games, at two European Dressage Championships, and competed at the 2020 Tokyo Olympic Games, finishing 23rd individually and 10th with the Belgian team.

== Career ==
Roos competed at five European Dressage Championships in various youth divisions, with an individual 6th-place finish at the 2016 Under-25 Championships being her career-best result.

She made her senior championship debut at the 2017 European Championships, when she advanced to the Grand Prix Special and eventually placed 21st. Following the successful debut, Roos became a strong presence in the Belgian team and got re-selected to compete at the 2018 World Equestrian Games and the 2019 European Championships. At both occasions she progressed through to the Special, and placed 26th and 25th individually, respectively. At the 2018 World Equestrian Games she helped her team to a 9th-place finish, a career highlight.

During the 2019 competition season, Roos earned an individual quota place for Belgium for the Tokyo Olympics. She got selected to represent her nation at said Olympics in March 2021.

Outside of equestrian, Laurence Roos is a qualified dentist and runs her own practice in Lichtaart.
