= Emmelie Scholtens =

Dutch dressage rider (born 1985)

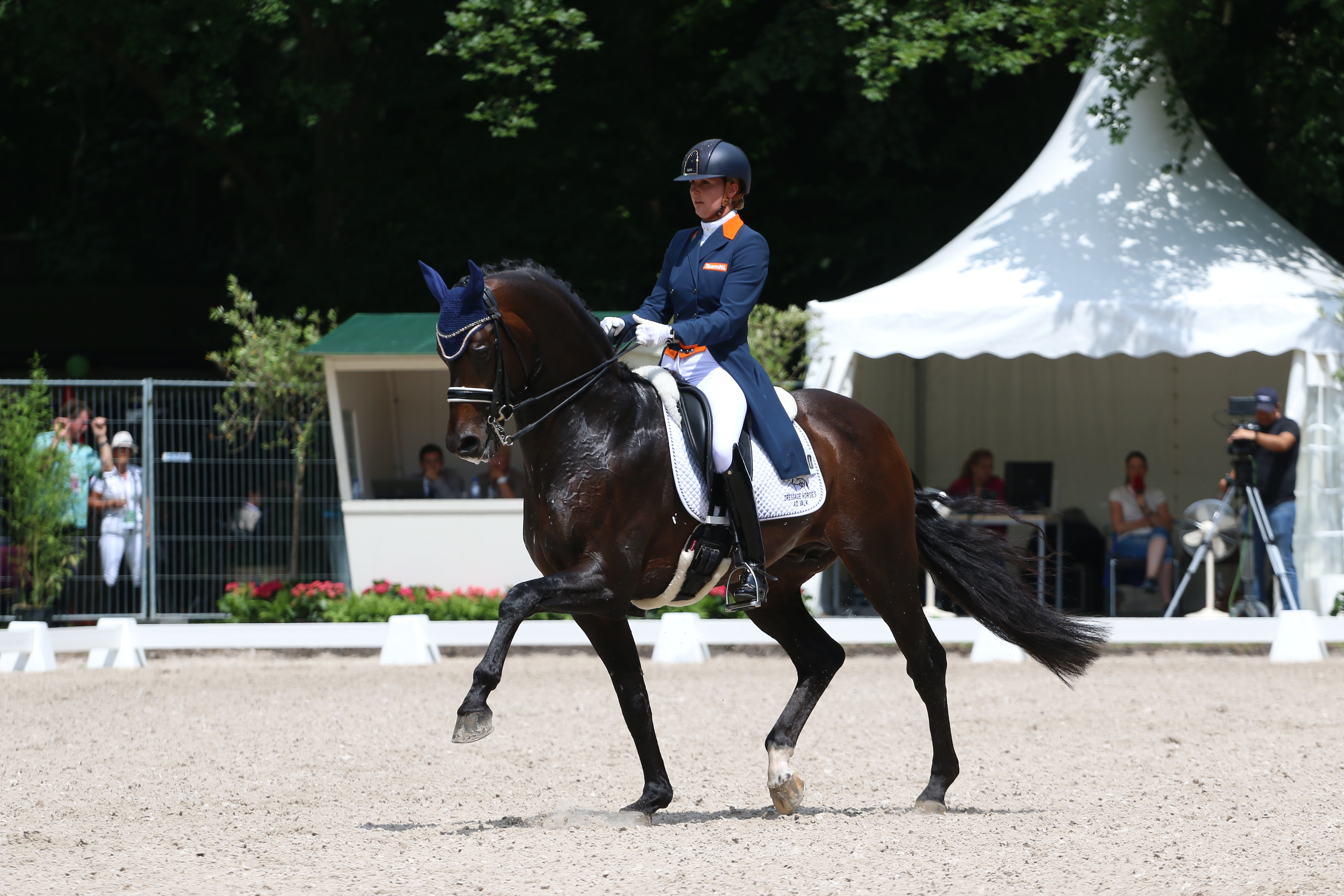
- Scholtens in 2017

Personal information
- Nationality: Dutch
- Born: 27 October 1985 (age 40) Groningen, Netherlands
- Website: www.wittescholtens.nl

Sport
- Country: Netherlands
- Sport: Equestrian
- Coached by: Edward Gal

Achievements and titles
- Olympic finals: 2024 Olympic Games
- World finals: 2018 World Equestrian Games
Medal record
Equestrian
Representing the Netherlands
European Championships
Silver medal – second place	2019 Rotterdam	Team dressage

Emmelie Scholtens (born 27 October 1985) is a Dutch dressage rider. She competed at the 2018 World Equestrian Games in Tryon and at the 2019 European Championships in Rotterdam where she won the silver medal with the Dutch team. She also won several medals at the World Championships for Young Dressage Horses. In 2019 she competed at the World Cup finals in Goteborg, Sweden with Apache.

Scholtens represented the Dutch team at the 2024 Olympic Games in Paris, finishing fourth with the team and eleventh in the individual final with her horse Indian Rock. It was her first appearance in the Olympic Games.

== Biography ==
Emmelie Scholtens is born in Groningen as a daughter of the famous Dutch breeder Thea Moerkert. All that Emmelie could walk she could already ride. She started working professionally in the horses at Stal Laarakkers but moved in 2009 to Stal Witte in Schijndel. Here she met her partner, Jeroen Witte. They have a dressage stable in Gorinchem, The Netherlands.

== Achievements ==
- Gold at the 2009 World Championships for Young Horses in Verden with Westpoint by the six-years-old division
- Gold at the 2010 World Championships for Young Horses in Verden with Astrix by the five-years-old division
- Gold at the 2011 World Championships for Young Horses in Verden with Astrix by the six-years-old division
- Silver at the 2012 World Championships for Young Horses in Verden with Borencio by the six-years-old division
- Bronze at the 2013 World Championships for Young Horses in Verden with Dorado by the five-years-old division
