= Tatyana Kosterina =

Russian equestrian

Personal information
- Full name: Tatyana Vladimirovna Kosterina
- Born: Tatyana Kosterina; 17 July 1977 (age 48) Nizhny Novgorod, Russia

Sport
- Country: Germany
- Sport: Equestrian

Achievements and titles
- World finals: 2018 World Equestrian Games
- Personal best(s): 72.300% (GP); 73.961% (GPS); 73.895% (GPF)

Tatyana Vladimirovna Kosterina (Russian: Татьяна Владимировна Костерина; born 17 July 1977) is a Russian dressage rider. She competed at the 2018 World Equestrian Games, multiple European Dressage Championships, and competed as part of the Russian dressage team at the delayed Tokyo 2020 Olympic Games.

Kosterina made her championships debut at the 2017 European Championships in Gothenburg, Sweden, where she placed 18th individually aboard Diavolessa and was the highest ranked Russian athlete. She went on to compete with Diavolessa at the 2018 World Equestrian Games and the 2019 European Championships, where she finished 35th and 33rd individually, respectively. Her highest team placing came at the 2019 Europeans, when the Russian team finished 9th.

Her best individual placement was at the 2017 CDI Hamburg Dressage Derby Grand Prix, where she won with a score of 72.300% on the Hanoverian mare Diavolessa vA.

Kosterina has been living and training in Germany since 2007. In May 2025, she acquired German citizenship in addition to her Russian citizenship, and as of July 2025, her sporting nationality is also German.
