= Antonia Ramel =

Swedish equestrian

Personal information
- Full name: Antonia Ramel
- Born: Jul 2, 1985 (age 40) Bettna Sweden

Sport
- Country: Sweden
- Sport: Equestrian
- Coached by: Patrik Kittel
Medal record
Equestrian
Representing Sweden
European Championships
Bronze medal – third place	2019 Rotterdam	Team dressage

Antonia Ramel (born 2 July 1985, Bettna) is a Swedish equestrian athlete. She competed at the 2019 European Championships in Rotterdam where she won team bronze with the Swedish dressage team. Her younger sister Juliette Ramel competed at the Rio Olympics in 2016. Together they were in the bronze-winning team in Rotterdam.

Ramel was part of the Swedish team during the 2020 Olympic Games in Tokyo, after Patrik Kittel withdrew from the competition due an injury of his horse Well Done de la Rouche. Ramel finished 35th in the individual competition and 6th with the team.
