= Florian Bacher =

Austrian equestrian (born 1985)

Personal information
- Born: 8 November 1985 (age 40) Vienna, Austria

Sport
- Country: Austria
- Sport: Equestrian

Achievements and titles
- Olympic finals: 2020 Olympic Games
- Regional finals: 2019 FEI European Championships

Florian Bacher (born 8 November 1985) is an Austrian equestrian athlete and former rider at the Spanish Riding School. He represented Austria at the 2019 FEI European Championships and participated at the 2020 Olympic Games in Japan, finishing 30th in the individual competition. He became national champion in 2019 aboard his horse Fidertraum.

Bacher is also former rider at the Spanish Riding School and started at the age of 16 through the SRS process and is one of the few riders that combined his career at the Spanish Riding School together with his sport career. After 18 years working as rider for the Spanish Riding School, he resigned in 2018. He trains with British Olympic gold medalist Carl Hester.
