= Therese Nilshagen =

Swedish dressage rider (born 1983)

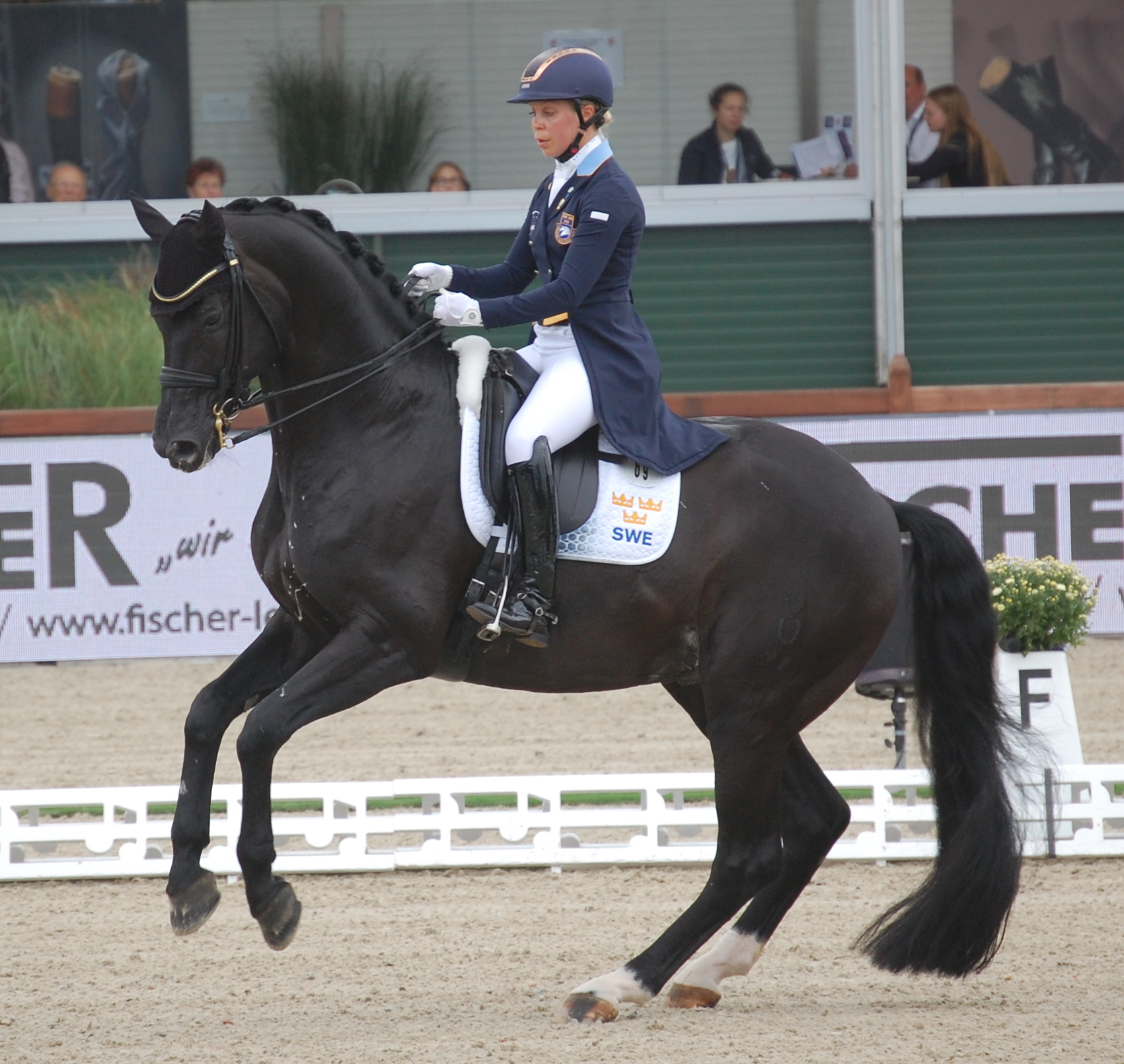
- Nilshagen in 2021

Personal information
- Full name: Marie Therese Nilshagen
- Born: 24 January 1983 (age 43) Stockholm, Sweden

Sport
- Country: Sweden
- Sport: Equestrian

Achievements and titles
- Olympic finals: Tokyo 2020; Paris 2024
- World finals: Tryon 2018; Herning 2022
Medal record
Equestrian
Representing Sweden
European Championships
Silver medal – second place	2017 Gothenburg	Team dressage
Bronze medal – third place	2019 Rotterdam	Team dressage

Marie Therese Nilshagen (born 24 January 1983) is a Swedish dressage rider. At the European Championships in Gothenburg 2017, she won team silver and at the Rotterdam 2019, she won team bronze, both with the black stallion Dante Weltino OLD. In 2016 she was selected for the 2016 Olympic Games in Rio de Janeiro, but during the vet-check, the horse was not fit, so she was replaced by fellow team rider Mads Hendeliowitz.

In 2021, Nilshagen was part of the Swedish Olympic team during the 2020 Summer Olympics in Tokyo, finished 14th in the individual final and 6th with the team. In 2024 she competed at the 2024 Olympic Games in Paris, finishing 6th in the team competition and 18th in the individual freestyle.

== Biography ==
Nilshagen started riding at an age of 8 at the local riding school in Sweden. Her international debut was in 2015 in Cappeln on Small Tour Level. In 2016 she competed for the first time at international Grand Prix level. That same year she was selected for the Swedish Olympic team. She is currently based in Germany. Nilshagen is fluent in Swedish, German, English and Finnish.
