= Juliette Ramel =

Swedish dressage rider

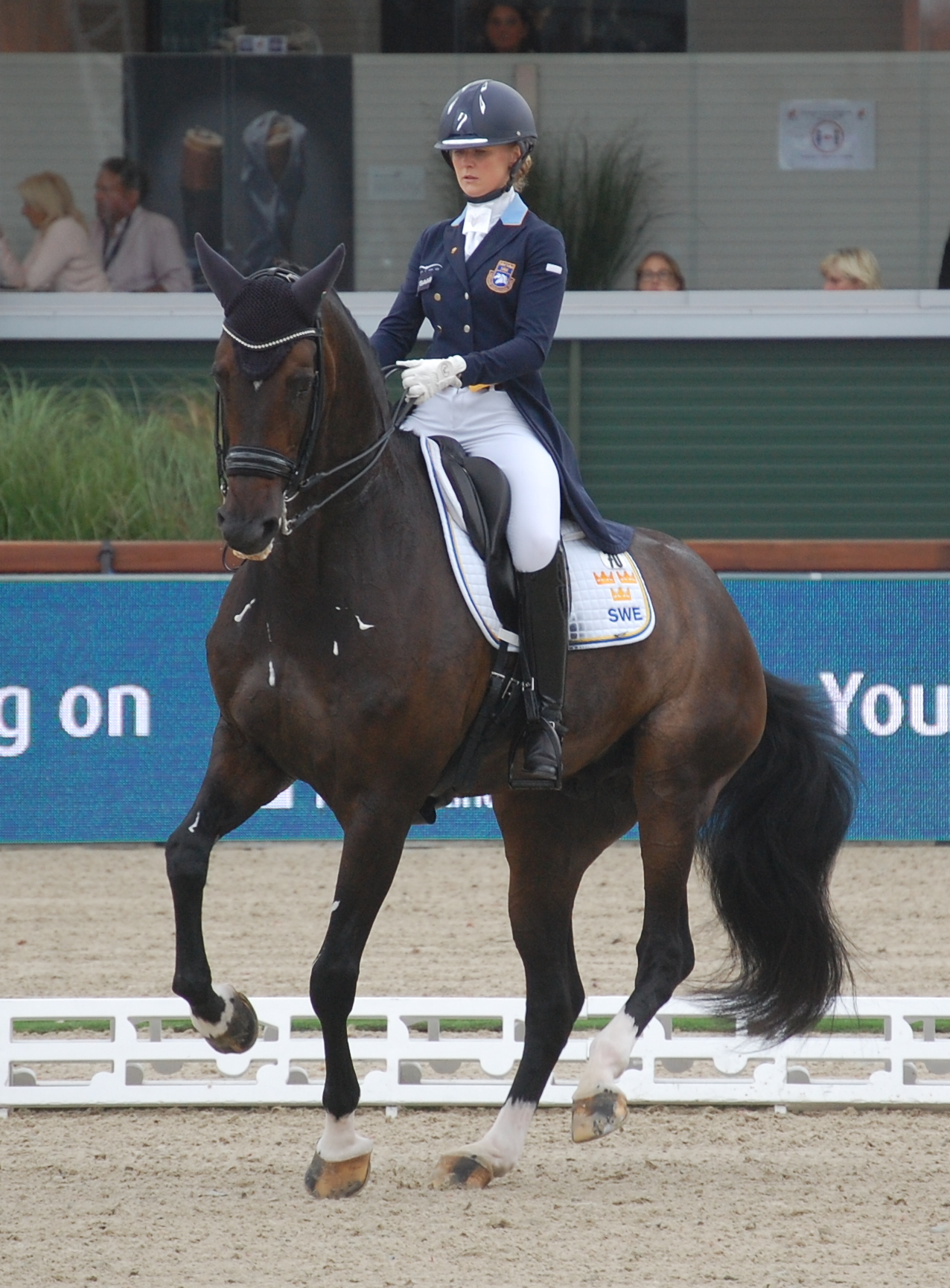
- Juliette Ramel and Buriel in 2021

Personal information
- Full name: Juliette Fanny Henriette Ramel
- Born: 12 April 1987 (age 39) Eslöv, Sweden
- Height: 171 cm (5 ft 7 in)
Medal record
Equestrian
Representing Sweden
European Championships
| Bronze medal – third place | 2019 Rotterdam | Team dressage |

Juliette Fanny Henriette Ramel (born 12 April 1987) is a Swedish Olympic dressage rider. Representing Sweden, she competed at the 2016 Summer Olympics in Rio de Janeiro where she finished 28th in the individual and 5th in the team competition. At the European Championships in Rotterdam 2019 she won team bronze together with her older sister Antonia Ramel.
