= Dorothee Schneider =

German dressage rider

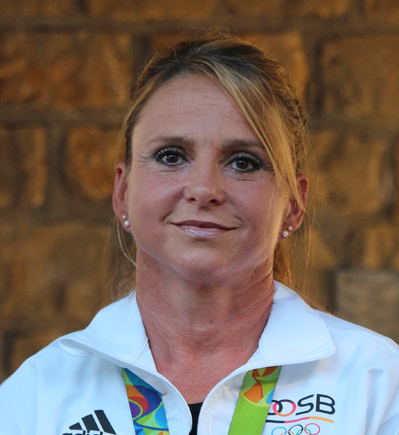
- Schneider in 2016

Personal information
- Nationality: German
- Born: 17 February 1969 (age 57) Mainz, West Germany
- Height: 170 cm (5 ft 7 in)
- Weight: 63 kg (139 lb)

Sport
- Country: Germany
- Sport: Equestrian
Medal record
Equestrian
Representing Germany
Olympic Games
Gold medal – first place	2016 Rio de Janeiro	Team dressage
Gold medal – first place	2020 Tokyo	Team dressage
Silver medal – second place	2012 London	Team dressage
World Championships
Gold medal – first place	2018 Tryon	Team dressage
European Championships
Gold medal – first place	2017 Gothenburg	Team dressage
Gold medal – first place	2019 Rotterdam	Team dressage
Gold medal – first place	2021 Hagen	Team dressage
Silver medal – second place	2019 Rotterdam	Special dressage
Silver medal – second place	2019 Rotterdam	Freestyle dressage

Dorothee Schneider (born 17 February 1969) is a German dressage rider competing at Olympic level. On 7 August 2012 Schneider was a member of the team which won the silver medal in the team dressage event.

On 12 August 2016 she was a member of the team which won the gold medal in the team dressage event at the 2016 Summer Olympics.

== International Championship results ==
Results
Year	Event	Horse	Score	Placing	Notes
2012	Olympic Games	Diva Royal	76.277%	2nd place, silver medalist(s)	Team
2012	Olympic Games	Diva Royal	81.661%	7th	Individual
2016	Olympic Games	Showtime FRH	80.986%	1st place, gold medalist(s)	Team
2016	Olympic Games	Showtime FRH	82.946%	6th	Individual
2017	European Championships	DSP Sammy Davis Jr	74.586%	1st place, gold medalist(s)	Team
2017	European Championships	DSP Sammy Davis Jr	73.249%	12th	Individual Special
2017	European Championships	DSP Sammy Davis Jr	76.289%	11th	Individual Freestyle
2017	World Young Horse Championships	Sisters Act OLD Vom Rosencarree	90.000%	4th	Five Year Old
2018	World Cup Final	DSP Sammy Davis Jr	81.843%	5th	
2018	World Equestrian Games	DSP Sammy Davis Jr	75.062%	1st place, gold medalist(s)	Team
2018	World Equestrian Games	DSP Sammy Davis Jr	75.608%	11th	Individual Special
2018	World Young Horse Championships	Sisters Act OLD Vom Rosencarree	85.400%	6th	Six Year Old
2018	World Young Horse Championships	Flying Dancer OLD	84.200%	7th	Six Year Old
2019	European Championships	Showtime FRH	80.233%	1st place, gold medalist(s)	Team
2019	European Championships	Showtime FRH	85.456%	2nd place, silver medalist(s)	Individual Special
2019	European Championships	Showtime FRH	90.561%	2nd place, silver medalist(s)	Individual Freestyle
2019	World Young Horse Championships	Dante's Hit OLD	86.400%	12th	Five Year Old
2019	World Young Horse Championships	Sisters Act OLD Vom Rosencarree	81.450%	5th	Seven Year Old

== Notable horses ==
- Diva Royal – 2002 Black Hanoverian Mare (Don Frederico x Warkant)
  - 2012 London Olympics – Team Silver Medal, Individual Seventh Place
- Sezuan - 2009 Black Danish Warmblood Stallion (Blue Hors Zack x Don Schufro)
  - 2014, 15 and 16 he won Gold at the World Championships for Young Dressage Horses, as the first stallion ever, three times in a row under Dorothee Schneider
- Showtime FRH – 2006 Dark Bay Hanoverian Gelding (Sandro Hit x Rotspon)
  - 2016 Rio Olympics – Team Gold Medal, Individual Sixth Place
- Sammy Davis Jr. – 2006 Black German Sport Horse Gelding (San Remo x Wenckstern)
  - 2017 European Championships – Team Gold Medal, Individual 11th Place
  - 2018 FEI World Cup Final – Fifth Place
- Sisters Act OLD Vom Rosencarree – 2012 Dark Bay Oldenburg Mare (Sandro Hit x Royal Diamond 5)
  - 2017 FEI Dressage Young Horse World Championships – Fourth Place
