= 2019 FEI European Championships =

2019 FEI European Championship
- Host city: Rotterdam, Netherlands
- Date(s): 19–25 August 2019
- Level: Senior
- Events: 5

The 2019 FEI European Championships was held in Rotterdam, Netherlands, from 19 to 25 August 2019. Competitions was held in three disciplines; jumping, dressage and para-dressage.

== Officials ==
The officials during the 2019 European Championships for Jumping, Dressage and Para-Dressage were nominated as follows;

Ground jury panel for the Show-Jumping;

- (Sweden) Sven Holmberg (Ground Jury President)
- (Germany) Joachim Geilfus (Ground Jury Member)
- (Netherlands) Laura van de Graaf (Ground Jury Member)
- (Spain) Maria Fernanda Cuervo Muniz (Ground Jury Member)
- (Netherlands) Willem Jan Luiten (Ground Jury Member)
- (Netherlands) Netty Thijsse van Zanten (Ground Jury Member)
- (Netherlands) Louis Konickx (Course Designer)
- (Republic of Ireland) Alan Wade (Technical Delegate)

Ground jury panel for the Dressage;

- (Netherlands) Mariëtte Sanders (Ground Jury President)
- (United States) Janet Foy (Ground Jury Member)
- (United Kingdom) Clive Halsall (Ground Jury Member)
- (Germany) Evi Eisenhardt (Ground Jury Member)
- (Russia) Irina Maknami (Ground Jury Member)
- (France) Isabelle Judet (Ground Jury Member)
- (Denmark) Susanne Baarup (Ground Jury Member)
- (Germany) Gotthilf Riexinger (Technical Delegate)

Ground jury panel for the Para-Dressage;

- (Netherlands) Jeannette Wolfs (Ground Jury President)
- (Germany) Elke Ebert (Ground Jury Member)
- (Italy) Katherine Lucheschi (Ground Jury Member)
- (Norway) Kjell Myhre (Ground Jury Member)
- (United Kingdom) Sarah Rodger (Ground Jury Member)
- (Germany) Marco Orsini (Technical Delegate)

== Medalists ==
=== Dressage ===
Event	Gold	Silver	Bronze
Special dressage Details	Isabell Werth on Bella Rose; Germany	Dorothee Schneider on Showtime FRH; Germany	Cathrine Dufour on Atterupgaards Cassidy; Denmark
Freestyle dressage Details	Isabell Werth on Bella Rose; Germany	Dorothee Schneider on Showtime FRH; Germany	Jessica von Bredow-Werndl on TSF Dalera BB; Germany
Team	Germany; Jessica von Bredow-Werndl on TSF Dalera BB; Dorothee Schneider on Showtime FRH; Sönke Rothenberger on Cosmo; Isabell Werth on Bella Rose	Netherlands; Anne Meulendijks on MDH Avanti; Hans Peter Minderhoud on Glock's Dream Boy; Emmelie Scholtens on Desperado; Edward Gal on Glock's Zonik	Sweden; Antonia Ramel on Brother de Jeu; Therese Nilshagen on Dante Weltino Old; Juliette Ramel on Buriel K.H. Patrik Kittel on Well Done de la Roche CMF

=== Jumping ===
Event	Gold	Silver	Bronze
Individual	Martin Fuchs on Clooney 51; Switzerland	Ben Maher on Explosion W Great Britain	Jos Verlooy on Igor; Belgium
Team	Belgium; Pieter Devos on Claire Z Jos Verlooy on Igor; Jérôme Guery on Quel Homme de Hus; Gregory Wathelet on MJT Nevados S	Germany; Simone Blum on DSP Alice; Christian Ahlmann on Clintrexo Z Marcus Ehning on Comme Il Faut; Daniel Deusser on Scuderia 1918 Tobago Z	(United Kingdom) Great Britain; Ben Maher on Explosion W Holly Smith on Hearts Destiny; Amanda Derbyshire on Luibanta BH; Scott Brash on Hello M'Lady

=== Para-Dressage ===
Event	Gold	Silver	Bronze
Individual test grade I	Jens Lasse Dokkan on Aladdin; Norway	Sara Morganti on Royal Delight; Italy	Rihards Snikus on King Of The Dance; Latvia
Individual test grade II	Pepo Puch on Sailor's Blue; Austria	Georgia Wilson on Midnight; Great Britain	Nicole den Dulk on Wallace; Netherlands
Individual test grade III	Tobias Jørgensen on Jolene Hill; Denmark	Rixt van der Horst on Findsley; Netherlands	Barbara Minneci on Stuart; Belgium
Individual test grade IV	Sanne Voets on Demantur; Netherlands	Manon Claeys on San Dior; Belgium	Louise Etzner Jakobsson on Zernard; Sweden
Individual test grade V	Frank Hosmar on Alphaville; Netherlands	Sophie Wells on C Fatal Attraction; Great Britain	Michele George on Best of 8 Belgium
Individual test grade I	Jens Lasse Dokkan on Aladdin; Norway	Sara Morganti on Royal Delight; Italy	Rihards Snikus on King Of The Dance; Latvia
Individual test grade II	Georgia Wilson on Midnight; Great Britain	Pepo Puch on Sailor's Blue; Austria	Nicole den Dulk on Wallace; Netherlands
Individual test grade III	Tobias Jørgensen on Jolene Hill; Denmark	Rixt van der Horst on Findsley; Netherlands	Barbara Minneci on Stuart; Belgium
Individual test grade IV	Sanne Voets on Demantur; Netherlands	Louise Etzner Jakobsson on Zernard; Sweden	Manon Claeys on San Dior; Belgium
Individual test grade V	Frank Hosmar on Alphaville; Netherlands	Sophie Wells on C Fatal Attraction; Great Britain	Michele George on Best of 8 Belgium
Team para-dressage	(Netherlands) Germany; Sanne Voets on Demantur; Frank Hosmar on Alphaville; Rixt van der Horst on Findsley; Nicole den Dulk on Wallace	(United Kingdom) Great Britain; Sophie Wells on C Fatal Attraction; Georgia Wilson on Midnight; Mari Durward Akhurst on Sky O'Hara; Nicky Greenhill on King Edward	Denmark; Tobias Jørgensen on Jolene Hill; Caroline Cecilie Nielsen on Davidoff 188; Camilla Christensen on Obreja's Sly; Line Thorning Jørgensen on Don Alivan

== Medals table ==
Host nation

Rank	Nation	Gold	Silver	Bronze	Total
1	Netherlands (NED)*	5	3	2	10
2	Germany (GER)	3	3	1	7
3	Denmark (DEN)	2	0	3	5
4	Norway (NOR)	2	0	0	2
5	Great Britain (GBR)	1	5	1	7
6	Belgium (BEL)	1	1	6	8
7	Austria (AUT)	1	1	0	2
8	Switzerland (SUI)	1	0	0	1
9	Italy (ITA)	0	2	0	2
10	Sweden (SWE)	0	1	2	3
11	Latvia (LAT)	0	0	2	2
Totals (11 entries)		16	16	17	49
