= 2015 FIBA Europe Under-18 Championship for Women =

2015 FIBA U18 Women's European Championship
32nd FIBA Under-18 Women's European Basketball Championship

Tournament details
- Host country: Slovenia
- Dates: 30 July – 9 August 2015
- Teams: 16
- Venues: 2 (in 1 host city)

Final positions
- Champions: Spain (5th title)

Official website
- FIBA Archive

The 2015 FIBA Europe Under-18 Championship for Women was the 32nd edition of the European Under-18 Women's Basketball Championship. 16 teams participated in the competition, held in Celje, Slovenia, from 30 July to 9 August 2015.

== Participating teams ==
- Belgium
- Croatia
- Czech Republic
- Estonia ▲ (Runners-up, 2014 FIBA Europe Under-18 Championship for Women Division B)
- France
- Hungary ▲ (Winners, 2014 FIBA Europe Under-18 Championship for Women Division B)
- Israel ▲ (3rd place, 2014 FIBA Europe Under-18 Championship for Women Division B)
- Italy
- Lithuania
- Netherlands
- Poland
- Portugal
- Russia
- Serbia
- Slovenia
- Spain

== First round ==
The first-round groups draw took place on 30 November 2014 in Budapest, Hungary. In the first round, the sixteen teams are allocated in four groups of four teams each. The top three teams of each group will qualify to the Second Round. The last team of each group will play in the Classification Group G first, then in the 9th–16th place playoffs.

All times are local – Central European Summer Time (UTC+2).

=== Group A ===
Pos	Team	Pld	W	L	PF	PA	PD	Pts	Qualification
1	France	3	3	0	191	130	+61	6	Advance to second round
2	Italy	3	2	1	226	185	+41	5	Advance to second round
3	Israel	3	1	2	165	204	−39	4	Advance to second round
4	Lithuania	3	0	3	171	234	−63	3	Classification Group G

Source: FIBA Archive

30 July 2015
14:00

Boxscore

Italy	51–65	France
Scoring by quarter: 8–16, 11–14, 19–15, 13–20
Pts: Ciavarella 16; Rebs: Pan 5 Asts: Santucci 2		Pts: Chartereau 15; Rebs: Dorby 8 Asts: Duchet 6

Zlatorog Sport Centre, (Slovenia) Celje
Attendance: 100
Referees:
(Serbia) Jasmina Juras
(Spain) Susana Gómez López
(Estonia) Mart Uuehendrik

30 July 2015
18:30

Boxscore

Lithuania	58–79	Israel
Scoring by quarter: 14–17, 13–14, 14–21, 17–27
Pts: Bobinaite 12; Rebs: Bobinaite, Juskaite 13; Asts: Jurciute, Knyzaite 3		Pts: Galili 23; Rebs: Levy 9 Asts: Danan, Lev 4

Zlatorog Sport Centre, (Slovenia) Celje
Attendance: 50
Referees:
(Slovenia) Milan Nedovic
(Poland) Dariusz Zapolski
(Netherlands) Joske Kuut

31 July 2015
14:00

Boxscore

Israel	55–90	Italy
Scoring by quarter: 20–28, 5–20, 15–25, 15–17
Pts: Danan, Tulman 13; Rebs: Levy 8 Asts: Abramov, Levy, Tulman 2		Pts: Pan 24; Rebs: Togliani, Policari, Pan 6 Asts: Santucci 6

Golovec Sport Centre, (Slovenia) Celje
Attendance: 100
Referees:
(Croatia) Jelena Tomic
(England) Kate Webb
(Russia) Alexey Chudin

31 July 2015
20:45

Boxscore

France	70–48	Lithuania
Scoring by quarter: 15–13, 15–9, 23–17, 17–9
Pts: Berkani 16; Rebs: Chartereau 12; Asts: Duchet 3		Pts: Juskaite 18; Rebs: Juskaite 13; Asts: Juskaite, Gudelionyte 1

Golovec Sport Centre, (Slovenia) Celje
Attendance: 50
Referees:
(Montenegro) Milosav Kaludjerovic
(Hungary) Csaba Cziffra
(Macau) Si-Man Alice Lei

1 August 2015
16:15

Boxscore

Israel	31–56	France
Scoring by quarter: 3–17, 8–12, 10–8, 10–19
Pts: Peleg Pelc 8 Rebs: Danan 7 Asts: Levy 1		Pts: Berkani, Chartereau 13; Rebs: Chartereau 12; Asts: Tadic, Duchet, Chartereau 3

Zlatorog Sport Centre, (Slovenia) Celje
Attendance: 50
Referees:
(Serbia) Jasmina Juras
(Bosnia and Herzegovina) Dragan Kralj
(Bulgaria) Svetlana Stoyanova

1 August 2015
20:45

Boxscore

Italy	85–65	Lithuania
Scoring by quarter: 18–25, 22–12, 16–15, 29–13
Pts: Porcu 21; Rebs: Policari 7 Asts: Santucci 5		Pts: Petrenaite 11; Rebs: Petrenaite 13; Asts: Meskonyté, Zukaité 2

Zlatorog Sport Centre, (Slovenia) Celje
Attendance: 150
Referees:
(Czech Republic) Ilona Kucerova
(Bosnia and Herzegovina) Milan Adamovic
(Portugal) Samira Barrima

=== Group B ===
Pos	Team	Pld	W	L	PF	PA	PD	Pts	Qualification
1	Spain	3	3	0	186	170	+16	6	Advance to second round
2	Russia	3	2	1	231	178	+53	5	Advance to second round
3	Portugal	3	1	2	192	187	+5	4	Advance to second round
4	Poland	3	0	3	121	195	−74	3	Classification Group G

Source: FIBA Archive

30 July 2015
16:15

Boxscore

Portugal	60–38	Poland
Scoring by quarter: 15–11, 15–10, 16–7, 14–10
Pts: Goncalves 30; Rebs: Kostourkova, Jordao 11; Asts: Bernardeco 9		Pts: Puc 12; Rebs: Puc 15; Asts: Niemojewska, Papiernik, Puc 2

Zlatorog Sport Centre, (Slovenia) Celje
Attendance: 100
Referees:
(Hungary) Csaba Cziffra
(Croatia) Jelena Tomic
(Greece) Vasiliki Tsaroucha

30 July 2015
20:45

Boxscore

Spain	70–63	Russia
Scoring by quarter: 6–23, 14–16, 30–10, 20–14
Pts: Salvadores 19; Rebs: López 11; Asts: Salvadores 4		Pts: Musina 21; Rebs: Musina 15; Asts: Musina 6

Zlatorog Sport Centre, (Slovenia) Celje
Attendance: 50
Referees:
(Bosnia and Herzegovina) Dragan Kralj
(Georgia (country)) Maka Kupatadze
(Bulgaria) Martin Horozov

31 July 2015
16:15

Boxscore

Russia	83–71	Portugal
Scoring by quarter: 14–22, 23–18, 14–15, 32–16
Pts: Frolkina 24; Rebs: Musina 15; Asts: Burovaya 10		Pts: Bernardeco 28; Rebs: Jordao 10; Asts: Nunes 3

Golovec Sport Centre, (Slovenia) Celje
Attendance: 100
Referees:
(Czech Republic) Ilona Kucerova
(Netherlands) Joske Kuut
(Latvia) Andris Aunkrogers

31 July 2015
18:30

Boxscore

Poland	46–50 (OT)	Spain
Scoring by quarter: 14–16, 8–13, 12–9, 8–4, Overtime: 4–8
Pts: Niedzwiedzka 12; Rebs: Puc, Darnikowska 8 Asts: Niemojewska 7		Pts: Conde 14; Rebs: Conde 14; Asts: Conde 4

Golovec Sport Centre, (Slovenia) Celje
Attendance: 50
Referees:
(Bosnia and Herzegovina) Milan Adamovic
(Estonia) Mart Uuehendrik
(Turkey) Emin Mogulkoc

1 August 2015
14:00

Boxscore

Spain	66–61 (OT)	Portugal
Scoring by quarter: 12–14, 19–12, 8–8, 13–18, Overtime: 14–9
Pts: Salvadores 22; Rebs: Muhate 10; Asts: Raventós 5		Pts: Umabano 23; Rebs: Kostourkova 14; Asts: Bernardeco 5

Zlatorog Sport Centre, (Slovenia) Celje
Attendance: 30
Referees:
(Slovenia) Milan Nedovic
(Lithuania) Mindaugas Vecerskis
(England) Kate Webb

1 August 2015
18:30

Boxscore

Poland	37–85	Russia
Scoring by quarter: 13–21, 3–24, 14–19, 7–21
Pts: Niedzwiedzka 9 Rebs: Darnikowska 5 Asts: Podkanska, Budkiewicz 2		Pts: Kozik 14; Rebs: Musina, Abaidullina 12; Asts: Kozik, Zavialova 4

Zlatorog Sport Centre, (Slovenia) Celje
Attendance: 100
Referees:
(France) Carole Delauné
(Georgia (country)) Maka Kupatadze
(Macau) Si-Man Alice Lei

=== Group C ===
Pos	Team	Pld	W	L	PF	PA	PD	Pts	Qualification
1	Slovenia	3	3	0	211	165	+46	6	Advance to second round
2	Hungary	3	2	1	184	183	+1	5	Advance to second round
3	Belgium	3	1	2	165	171	−6	4	Advance to second round
4	Serbia	3	0	3	158	199	−41	3	Classification Group G

Source: FIBA Archive

30 July 2015
18:30

Boxscore

Serbia	56–72	Slovenia
Scoring by quarter: 19–19, 17–26, 15–10, 5–17
Pts: Bogičević 22; Rebs: Bogičević 7 Asts: Katanić 4		Pts: Prezelj 26; Rebs: Ocvirk 13; Asts: Senicar 3

Golovec Sport Centre, (Slovenia) Celje
Attendance: 1000
Referees:
(Turkey) Emin Mogulkoc
(Russia) Alexey Chudin
(Bulgaria) Svetlana Stoyanova

30 July 2015
20:45

Boxscore

Hungary	57–56	Belgium
Scoring by quarter: 21–13, 14–20, 10–13, 12–10
Pts: Aho 13; Rebs: Kiss 18; Asts: Aho 3		Pts: Ouahabi, Maesschalck 15; Rebs: Maesschalck, Geldorf 8 Asts: Maesschalck 3

Golovec Sport Centre, (Slovenia) Celje
Attendance: 300
Referees:
(Montenegro) Milosav Kaludjerovic
(Czech Republic) Ilona Kucerova
(England) Kate Webb

31 July 2015
16:15

Boxscore

Belgium	50–46	Serbia
Scoring by quarter: 19–6, 8–14, 9–11, 14–15
Pts: Geldorf 13; Rebs: Ramette 13; Asts: Ramette 3		Pts: Katanić 11; Rebs: Bogičević 9 Asts: Katanić 4

Zlatorog Sport Centre, (Slovenia) Celje
Attendance: 75
Referees:
(Portugal) Samira Barrima
(Poland) Dariusz Zapolski
(Lithuania) Mindaugas Vecerskis

31 July 2015
18:30

Boxscore

Slovenia	71–50	Hungary
Scoring by quarter: 13–17, 18–15, 20–10, 20–8
Pts: Prezelj 25; Rebs: Ocvirk 8 Asts: Senicar 4		Pts: Dubei 12; Rebs: Kiss, Dubei 9 Asts: Studer, Böröndy, Weninger, Aho 2

Zlatorog Sport Centre, (Slovenia) Celje
Attendance: 450
Referees:
(Spain) Susana Gómez López
(France) Carole Delauné
(Bosnia and Herzegovina) Dragan Kralj

1 August 2015
14:00

Boxscore

Hungary	77–56	Serbia
Scoring by quarter: 17–15, 20–12, 24–16, 16–13
Pts: Weninger 17; Rebs: Kuttor 15; Asts: Böröndy 4		Pts: Katanić, Nogić 11; Rebs: Bogičević 7 Asts: Nogić 3

Golovec Sport Centre, (Slovenia) Celje
Attendance: 100
Referees:
(Croatia) Jelena Tomic
(Netherlands) Joske Kuut
(Bulgaria) Martin Horozov

1 August 2015
18:30

Boxscore

Slovenia	68–59	Belgium
Scoring by quarter: 23–10, 14–21, 14–17, 17–11
Pts: Prezelj 22; Rebs: Ocvirk 9 Asts: Potocnik 3		Pts: Maesschalck 13; Rebs: Geldorf 7 Asts: Ramette 5

Golovec Sport Centre, (Slovenia) Celje
Attendance: 1500
Referees:
(Latvia) Andris Aunkrogers
(Estonia) Mart Uuehendrik
(Greece) Vasiliki Tsaroucha

=== Group D ===
Pos	Team	Pld	W	L	PF	PA	PD	Pts	Qualification
1	Croatia	3	2	1	209	184	+25	5	Advance to second round
2	Netherlands	3	2	1	190	164	+26	5	Advance to second round
3	Czech Republic	3	2	1	202	162	+40	5	Advance to second round
4	Estonia	3	0	3	115	206	−91	3	Classification Group G

Source: FIBA Archive

30 July 2015
13:30

Boxscore

Czech Republic	66–78	Croatia
Scoring by quarter: 17–25, 19–12, 12–16, 18–25
Pts: Holesínská 21; Rebs: Reisingerová 13; Asts: Malecková, Soukalová 4		Pts: Slonjšak 29; Rebs: Kelava 9 Asts: Kelava 4

Golovec Sport Centre, (Slovenia) Celje
Attendance: 60
Referees:
Andris Aunkrogers (Latvia)
Mindaugas Vecerskis (Lithuania)
Samira Barrima (Portugal)

30 July 2015
15:45

Boxscore

Netherlands	66–37	Estonia
Scoring by quarter: 18–11, 12–7, 22–7, 14–12
Pts: Kantebeen 14; Rebs: Ndiba Boonstra 12; Asts: van Vlijmen 5		Pts: Adelbert 8 Rebs: Aer 8 Asts: Adelbert, Viirmaa 2

Golovec Sport Centre, (Slovenia) Celje
Attendance: 50
Referees:
Carole Delauné (France)
Milan Adamović (Bosnia and Herzegovina)
Si-Man Alice Lei (Macau)

31 July 2015
14:00

Boxscore

Estonia	29–76	Czech Republic
Scoring by quarter: 9–28, 9–13, 6–19, 5–16
Pts: Uiga 9 Rebs: Uiga 7 Asts: Kalda, Uiga, Reinvald 1		Pts: Krejzová 21; Rebs: Rokosová 8 Asts: Matušková 5

Zlatorog Sport Centre, (Slovenia) Celje
Attendance: 35
Referees:
Maka Kupatadze (Georgia (country))
Milan Nedovič (Slovenia)
Svetlana Sroyanova (Bulgaria)

31 July 2015
20:45

Boxscore

Croatia	67–69 (OT)	Netherlands
Scoring by quarter: 16–10, 14–16, 17–12, 13–22, Overtime: 7–9
Pts: Dojkić 22; Rebs: Kelava 11; Asts: Slonjšak, Dojkić 2		Pts: Westerik 18; Rebs: Ndiba Boonstra 10; Asts: Vlijmen 5

Zlatorog Sport Centre, (Slovenia) Celje
Attendance: 80
Referees:
Martin Horozov (Bulgaria)
Jasmina Juras (Serbia)
Vasiliki Tsaroucha (Greece)

1 August 2015
16:15

Boxscore

Czech Republic	60–55	Netherlands
Scoring by quarter: 26–10, 16–12, 11–15, 7–18
Pts: Reisingerová 17; Rebs: Reisingerová 15; Asts: Soukalová 4		Pts: Westerik 18; Rebs: Ndiba Boonstra 8 Asts: Westerik 4

Golovec Sport Centre, (Slovenia) Celje
Attendance: 150
Referees:
Milosav Kaludjerović (Montenegro)
Susana Gómez López (Spain)
Alexey Chudin (Russia)

1 August 2015
20:45

Boxscore

Estonia	49–64	Croatia
Scoring by quarter: 12–18, 13–17, 13–16, 11–13
Pts: Adelbert 12; Rebs: Adelbert, Aer, Reinvald 8 Asts: Reinvald 5		Pts: Slonjšak, Dojkić 17; Rebs: Kelava 10; Asts: Dojkić 5

Golovec Sport Centre, (Slovenia) Celje
Attendance: 55
Referees:
Csaba Cziffra (Hungary)
Emin Mogulkoc (Turkey)
Dariusz Zapolski (Poland)

== Second round ==
Twelve advancing teams from the First Round will be allocated in two groups of six teams each. The top four teams of each group will advance to the quarterfinals. The last two teams of each group will play in the 9th–16th place playoffs against the teams from the Group G.

=== Group E ===
Pos	Team	Pld	W	L	PF	PA	PD	Pts	Qualification
1	France	5	5	0	285	228	+57	10	Advance to Quarterfinals
2	Spain	5	4	1	341	301	+40	9	Advance to Quarterfinals
3	Russia	5	3	2	337	301	+36	8	Advance to Quarterfinals
4	Italy	5	2	3	314	294	+20	7	Advance to Quarterfinals
5	Portugal	5	1	4	281	295	−14	6	9th – 16th place playoffs
6	Israel	5	0	5	232	371	−139	5	9th – 16th place playoffs

Source: FIBA Archive

3 August 2015
16:15

Boxscore

Spain	83–52	Israel
Scoring by quarter: 18–16, 23–17, 32–13, 10–6
Scoring by half: 41–33
Pts: A. López 19, Raventos 13, I.López 12; Rebs: I. López 7, Conde 6 Asts: Cazorla 5, A. López 4		Pts: Grossman 16, Rotberg 13; Rebs: Levy 11, Rotberg 6 Asts: Rotberg 3

Zlatorog Sport Centre, Celje (SLO)
Attendance: 40
Referees: Ilona Kučerova (CZE), Milan Adamović (BIH), Si-Man Alice Lei (MAC)

3 August 2015
18:30

Boxscore

Portugal	44–50	France
Scoring by quarter: 6–15, 11–16, 16–12, 11–7
Scoring by half: 17–31
Pts: Kostourkova 15; Rebs: Kostourkova 11; Asts: Bernardeco 3		Pts: Djaldi-Tabdi 14; Rebs: Chartereau 11; Asts: Duchet 5

Zlatorog Sport Centre, Celje (SLO)
Attendance: 100
Referees: Maka Kupatadze (GEO), Dragan Kralj (BIH), Mart Uuehendrik (EST)

3 August 2015
20:45

Boxscore

Russia	64–53	Italy
Scoring by quarter: 23–10, 12–12, 12–21, 17–10
Scoring by half: 35–22
Pts: Musina 22; Rebs: Musina 18; Asts: Zavialova 5		Pts: Keys 16; Rebs: Keys 16; Asts: Santucci 2

Zlatorog Sport Centre, Celje (SLO)
Attendance: 100
Referees: Emin Mogulkoc (TUR), Joske Kuut (NED), Milan Nedovič (SLO)

4 August 2015
16:15

Boxscore

France	56–48	Russia
Scoring by quarter: 15–9, 10–15, 16–15, 15–9
Scoring by half: 25–24
Pts: Berkani 23; Rebs: Dorby 12; Asts: Duchet 4		Pts: Burovaya 11; Rebs: Musina 8 Asts: Burovaya, Frolkina 1

Golovec Sport Centre, Celje (SLO)
Attendance: 100
Referees: Ilona Kučerova (CZE), Jelena Tomić (CRO), Dariusz Zapolski (POL)

4 August 2015
18:30

Boxscore

Italy	67–68 (OT)	Spain
Scoring by quarter: 18–13, 9–7, 15–24, 17–15, Overtime: 8–9
Scoring by half: 27–20 Overtime: 8–9
Pts: Pan 20; Rebs: Keys 10; Asts: Pan 3		Pts: Salvadores 31; Rebs: I.López 13; Asts: Cazorla 5

Golovec Sport Centre, Celje (SLO)
Attendance: 100
Referees: Andris Aunkrogers (LAT), Dragan Kralj (BIH), Mindaugas Vecerskis (LTU)

4 August 2015
20:45

Boxscore

Israel	43–63	Portugal
Scoring by quarter: 16–18, 6–15, 11–20, 10–10
Scoring by half: 22–33
Pts: Galili 10; Rebs: Lavy 6 Asts: Lavy, Levy 2		Pts: Kostourkova 15; Rebs: Kostourkova 16; Asts: Bernardeco 4

Golovec Sport Centre, Celje (SLO)
Attendance: 100
Referees: Milan Nedovič (SLO), Csaba Cziffra (HUN), Svetlana Stoyanova (BUL)

5 August 2015
16:15

Boxscore

Portugal	42–53	Italy
Scoring by quarter: 8–9, 8–7, 13–18, 13–19
Scoring by half: 16–16
Pts: Kostourkova 14; Rebs: Kostourkova 12; Asts: 4 players tied 2		Pts: Ciavarella 14; Rebs: Santucci 8 Asts: Santucci 3

Zlatorog Sport Centre, Celje (SLO)
Attendance: 65
Referees: Jasmina Juras (SRB), Jelena Tomić (CRO), Dragan Kralj (BIH)

5 August 2015
18:30

Boxscore

Russia	79–51	Israel
Scoring by quarter: 21–13, 24–7, 18–17, 16–14
Scoring by half: 45–20
Pts: Musina 22; Rebs: Safonova 10; Asts: Safonova 4		Pts: Rotberg, Lavy 10; Rebs: Levy 5 Asts: Lavy, Tulman 2

Zlatorog Sport Centre, Celje (SLO)
Attendance: 100
Referees: Mart Uuehendrik (EST), Joske Kuut (NED), Si-Man Alice Lei (MAC)

5 August 2015
20:45

Boxscore

Spain	54–58	France
Scoring by quarter: 19–6, 12–8, 5–25, 18–19
Scoring by half: 31–14
Pts: Salvadores 16; Rebs: I. López 13; Asts: Salvadores 4		Pts: Duchet, Berkani 10; Rebs: Chartereau 17; Asts: Duchet 5

Zlatorog Sport Centre, Celje (SLO)
Attendance: 150
Referees: Emin Mogulkoc (TUR), Milan Nedovič (SLO), Milan Adamović (BIH)

=== Group F ===
Pos	Team	Pld	W	L	PF	PA	PD	Pts	Qualification
1	Czech Republic	5	4	1	335	293	+42	9 (Note: Czech Republic–Slovenia 62–58)	Advance to Quarterfinals
2	Slovenia	5	4	1	357	298	+59	9	Advance to Quarterfinals
3	Belgium	5	2	3	284	274	+10	7	Advance to Quarterfinals
4	Netherlands	5	2	3	267	307	−40	7	Advance to Quarterfinals
5	Croatia	5	2	3	325	329	−4	7	9th – 16th place playoffs
6	Hungary	5	1	4	254	321	−67	6	9th – 16th place playoffs

Source: FIBA Archive
Notes:

3 August 2015
16:15

Boxscore

Netherlands	53–46	Hungary
Scoring by quarter: 6–14, 13–11, 18–12, 16–9
Scoring by half: 19–25
Pts: Ndiba 22; Rebs: Ndiba 13; Asts: van Vlijmen 6		Pts: Dubei 15; Rebs: Kuttor 11; Asts: Kiss 2

Golovec Sport Centre, Celje (SLO)
Attendance: 150
Referees: Andris Aunkrogers (LAT), Mindaugas Večerskis (LTU), Samira Barrima (POR)

3 August 2015
18:30

Boxscore

Czech Republic	62–58	Slovenia
Scoring by quarter: 21–15, 12–19, 13–9, 16–15
Scoring by half: 33–34
Pts: Holesínská, Reisingerová 13; Rebs: Reisingerová 11; Asts: Malecková, Soukalová 3		Pts: Gwashavanhu 15; Rebs: Ocvirk 10; Asts: Potocnik, Senicar 4

Golovec Sport Centre, Celje (SLO)
Attendance: 1500
Referees: Jasmina Juras (SRB), Dariusz Zapolski (POL), Martin Horozov (BUL)

3 August 2015
20:45

Boxscore

Croatia	51–55	Belgium
Scoring by quarter: 17–13, 10–13, 17–18, 7–11
Scoring by half: 27–26
Pts: Slonjsak 17; Rebs: Kelava 14; Asts: Erjavec, Simunic 2		Pts: Ouahabi 14; Rebs: Geldof 15; Asts: Ramette 5

Golovec Sport Centre, Celje (SLO)
Attendance: 100
Referees: Carole Delauné (FRA), Alexey Chudin (RUS), Svetlana Stoyanova (BUL)

4 August 2015
16:15

Boxscore

Belgium	53–62	Czech Republic
Scoring by quarter: 8–16, 10–16, 13–21, 22–9
Scoring by half: 18–32
Pts: Mense 11; Rebs: Geldof, Henket 6 Asts: Ouahabi 4		Pts: Reisingerová 24; Rebs: Reisingerová 10; Asts: Malecková, Sípová 3

Zlatorog Sport Centre, Celje (SLO)
Attendance: 100
Referees: Emin Mogulkoc (TUR), Mart Uuehendrik (EST), Vasiliki Tsaroucha (GRE)

4 August 2015
18:30

Boxscore

Slovenia	73–54	Netherlands
Scoring by quarter: 18–10, 22–3, 17–17, 16–24
Scoring by half: 40–13
Pts: Prezelj 15; Rebs: Gwashavanhu 9 Asts: Senicar 5		Pts: Dekker 13; Rebs: van Schie 13; Asts: 3 tied with 2

Zlatorog Sport Centre, Celje (SLO)
Attendance: 700
Referees: Maka Kupatadze (GEO), Milosav Kaludjerović (MNE), Kate Webb (ENG)

4 August 2015
20:45

Boxscore

Hungary	52–56	Croatia
Scoring by quarter: 16–17, 14–19, 9–14, 13–6
Scoring by half: 30–36
Pts: Dubei 18; Rebs: Dubei 10; Asts: Aho 4		Pts: Dojkić 27; Rebs: Dojkić 13; Asts: Dojkić 3

Zlatorog Sport Centre, Celje (SLO)
Attendance: 55
Referees: Jasmina Juras (SRB), Susana Gómez López (ESP), Martin Horozov (BUL)

5 August 2015
16:15

Boxscore

Czech Republic	85–49	Hungary
Scoring by quarter: 21–10, 22–10, 24–12, 18–17
Scoring by half: 43–20
Pts: Holesínská 27; Rebs: Reisingerová 14; Asts: Malecková 5		Pts: Török 16; Rebs: Török, Kuttor 8 Asts: 5 tied with 1

Golovec Sport Centre, Celje (SLO)
Attendance: 150
Referees: Maka Kupatadze (GEO), Milosav Kaludjerovic (MNE), Samira Barrima (POR)

5 August 2015
18:30

Boxscore

Croatia	73–87	Slovenia
Scoring by quarter: 18–24, 25–21, 14–24, 16–18
Scoring by half: 43–45
Pts: Slonjsak 20; Rebs: Dojkić 10; Asts: Slonjsak 6		Pts: Ocvirk 21; Rebs: Ocvirk 9 Asts: Jakobcic 7

Golovec Sport Centre, Celje (SLO)
Attendance: 1000
Referees: Andris Aunkrogers (LAT), Carole Delauné (FRA), Mindaugas Večerskis (LTU)

5 August 2015
20:45

Boxscore

Netherlands	36–61	Belgium
Scoring by quarter: 8–9, 13–18, 8–13, 7–21
Scoring by half: 21–27
Pts: Dekker 10; Rebs: Westerik 8 Asts: Westerik 2		Pts: Ouahabi 19; Rebs: Geldof 9 Asts: Ramette 3

Golovec Sport Centre, Celje (SLO)
Attendance: 100
Referees: Alexey Chudin (RUS), Susana Gómez López (ESP), Dariusz Zapolski (POL)

== Classification Group G ==
Last placed team from each group of first round competes in classification round-robin group for lower four seeds in 9th–16th place playoff.

Pos	Team	Pld	W	L	PF	PA	PD	Pts
1	Poland	3	3	0	192	135	+57	6
2	Lithuania	3	2	1	177	163	+14	5
3	Serbia	3	1	2	177	187	−10	4
4	Estonia	3	0	3	136	197	−61	3

Source: FIBA Archive

3 August 2015
14:00

Boxscore

Lithuania	67–44	Estonia
Scoring by quarter: 16–14, 16–9, 17–11, 18–10
Scoring by half: 32–23
Pts: Bobinaite 22, Gudelionyte 14; Rebs: Juškaitė 8, Gudelionyte 5 Asts: Meskonyté 2		Pts: Viirmaa 15; Rebs: Kalda 9, Uiga 6 Asts: Uiga 5

Zlatorog Sport Centre, Celje (Slovenia)
Attendance: 15
Referees: Jelena Tomić (CRO), Milosav Kaludjerović (MNE), Vasiliki Tsaroucha (GRE)

3 August 2015
14:00

Boxscore

Poland	64–56	Serbia
Scoring by quarter: 19–13, 13–15, 21–7, 11–21
Scoring by half: 32–28
Pts: Niemojewska, Puc 13; Rebs: Puc 6, 3 players 5 Asts: Niemojewska, Puc 3		Pts: Nogić 17, Arsenić, Bogičević 10; Rebs: Bogičević 9 Asts: Katanić 5

Golovec Sport Centre, Celje (Slovenia)
Attendance: 50
Referees: Susana Gómez López (ESP), Kate Webb (ENG), Csaba Cziffra (HUN)

4 August 2015
14:00

Boxscore

Serbia	66–70	Lithuania
Scoring by quarter: 15–22, 15–14, 13–18, 23–16
Scoring by half: 30–36
Pts: Nogić 24, Arsenić 16; Rebs: Arsenić 7, Bogičević, Nogić, Vučetić 6 Asts: Nogić 7, Bogičević 3		Pts: Bobinaite 16, Juškaitė, Petrenaite 12; Rebs: Juskaite 9, Meskonyté, Petrenaite 5 Asts: Knyzaite 4, Juskaite, Meskonyté 3

Zlatorog Sport Centre, Celje (Slovenia)
Attendance: 50
Referees: Carole Delauné (FRA), Alexey Chudin (RUS), Si-Man Alice Lei (MAC)

4 August 2015
14:00

Boxscore

Estonia	39–75	Poland
Scoring by quarter: 17–22, 7–13, 7–25, 8–15
Scoring by half: 24–35
Pts: Saar 10; Rebs: Reinvald, Aer 6 Asts: Reinvald 3		Pts: Puc 14, Budkiewicz 11; Rebs: Parzenska, Puc 5 Asts: Niemojewska 4

Golovec Sport Centre, Celje (Slovenia)
Attendance: 50
Referees: Milan Adamović (BIH), Joske Kuut (NED), Samira Barrima (POR)

5 August 2015
14:00

Boxscore

Lithuania	40–53	Poland
Scoring by quarter: 17–18, 5–19, 7–5, 11–11
Scoring by half: 22–37
Pts: Juškaitė, Petrenaite 7 Rebs: Gudelionyte 8, Juškaitė, Petrenaite 6 Asts: Meskonyté 2		Pts: Niedzwiedzka 15, Budkiewicz 12; Rebs: Puc 12, Papiernik 7 Asts: Puc 4

Golovec Sport Centre, Celje (Slovenia)
Attendance: 50
Referees: Martin Horozov (BUL), Kate Webb (ENG), Vasiliki Tsaroucha (GRE)

5 August 2015
14:00

Boxscore

Serbia	55–53	Estonia
Scoring by quarter: 8–17, 19–16, 22–9, 6–11
Scoring by half: 27–33
Pts: Nogić 11, Katanić, Vučković 9 Rebs: Subašić 10, Katanić 7, Arsenić, Nogić 6 Asts: Zec 4, Katanić 3		Pts: Uiga 16, Tael 8 Rebs: Uiga 18, Reinvald 6 Asts: Uiga 5

Zlatorog Sport Centre, Celje (Slovenia)
Attendance: 45
Referees: Ilona Kučerova (CZE), Csaba Cziffra (HUN), Svetlana Stoyanova (BUL)

== Classification playoffs for 9th – 16th place ==
13th place match
G1	Poland	41
F6	Hungary	46
15th place match
G4	Estonia	49
E5	Portugal	60

13th – 16th place playoffs
G4	Estonia	47
G1	Poland	67
E5	Portugal	57
F6	Hungary	58

9th – 16th place playoffs
F5	Croatia	65
G4	Estonia	50
E6	Israel	56
G1	Poland	44
E5	Portugal	50
G3	Serbia	57
F6	Hungary	68
G2	Lithuania	72

9th – 12th place playoffs
F5	Croatia	77
E6	Israel	62
G3	Serbia	43
G2	Lithuania	78

9th place match
F5	Croatia	71
G2	Lithuania	55
11th place match
E6	Israel	45
G3	Serbia	73

=== Classification games for 9th – 16th place ===
7 August 2015
14:00

Boxscore

Portugal	50–57	Serbia
Scoring by quarter: 14–14, 12–16, 14–17, 10–10
Pts: Jordao 10; Rebs: Kostourkova 14; Asts: Bernardeco 5		Pts: Arsenic 14; Rebs: Arsenic 11; Asts: Katanic 5

Golovec Sport Centre, Celje (Slovenia)
Attendance: 60
Referees: Dariusz Zapolski (POL), Vasiliki Tsaroucha (GRE), Kate Webb (ENG)

7 August 2015
16:15

Boxscore

Hungary	68–72	Lithuania
Scoring by quarter: 19–16, 26–16, 11–20, 12–20
Pts: Dubei 28; Rebs: Dubei 14; Asts: Kiss, Aho 5		Pts: Meskonyté 15; Rebs: Juškaitė 8 Asts: Juškaitė, Knyzaite 3

Golovec Sport Centre, Celje (Slovenia)
Attendance: 55
Referees: Jelena Tomic (CRO), Milosav Kaludjerovic (MNE), Svetlana Stoyanova (BUL)

7 August 2015
18:30

Boxscore

Croatia	65–50	Estonia
Scoring by quarter: 22–11, 19–20, 11–10, 13–9
Pts: Dojkić 23; Rebs: Slonjsak 8 Asts: Simunic 5		Pts: Uiga 18; Rebs: Uiga 13; Asts: Aer 3

Golovec Sport Centre, Celje (Slovenia)
Attendance: 100
Referees: Maka Kupatadze (GEO), Mindaugas Vecerskis (LTU), Si-Man Alice Lei (MAC)

7 August 2015
20:45

Boxscore

Israel	56–44	Poland
Scoring by quarter: 14–13, 14–7, 12–14, 16–10
Pts: Rotberg, Galili 14; Rebs: Danan, Rotberg 5 Asts: Rotberg 3		Pts: Szloser 14; Rebs: Szloser 10; Asts: Niemojewska 4

Golovec Sport Centre, Celje (Slovenia)
Attendance: 100
Referees: Jasmina Juras (SRB), Martin Horozov (BUL), Samira Barrima (POR)

=== Classification games for 13th – 16th place ===
8 August 2015
14:00

Boxscore

Portugal	57–58	Hungary
Scoring by quarter: 17–14, 6–15, 22–15, 12–14
Pts: Umabano 14; Rebs: Kostourkova 10; Asts: Bernardeco 10		Pts: Dubei 23; Rebs: Kiss 12; Asts: Aho 4

Golovec Sport Centre, Celje (Slovenia)
Attendance: 80
Referees: Susana Gómez López (ESP), Alexey Chudin (RUS), Milan Adamovic (BIH)

8 August 2015
16:15

Boxscore

Estonia	47–67	Poland
Scoring by quarter: 16–22, 12–17, 7–11, 12–17
Pts: Tael 14; Rebs: Uiga, Reinvald 7 Asts: Viirmaa 4		Pts: Niemojewska 14; Rebs: Papiernik 6 Asts: Niemojewska 4

Golovec Sport Centre, Celje (Slovenia)
Attendance: 50
Referees: Ilona Kucerova (CZE), Milosav Kaludjerovic (MNE), Kate Webb (ENG)

=== Classification games for 9th – 12th place ===
8 August 2015
18:30

Boxscore

Croatia	77–62	Israel
Scoring by quarter: 19–10, 20–20, 23–19, 15–13
Pts: Slonjsak 27; Rebs: Simunic 17; Asts: Simunic 4		Pts: Rotberg 18; Rebs: Galili 6 Asts: Tulman 3

Golovec Sport Centre, Celje (Slovenia)
Attendance: 50
Referees: Mart Uuehendrik (EST), Dariusz Zapolski (POL), Si-Man Alice Lei (MAC)

8 August 2015
20:45

Boxscore

Serbia	43–78	Lithuania
Scoring by quarter: 11–24, 15–18, 8–24, 9–12
Pts: Marinkovic 12; Rebs: Bogicevic, Katanic 7 Asts: Nogić 2		Pts: Meskonyté 25; Rebs: Strimaityte 7 Asts: Zukaité 3

Golovec Sport Centre, Celje (Slovenia)
Attendance: 50
Referees: Alexey Chudin (RUS), Vasiliki Tsaroucha (GRE), Samira Barrima (POR)

== Championship playoffs ==
Fifth place
F2	Slovenia	82
F1	Czech Republic	55
Seventh place
F4	Netherlands	50
F3	Belgium	58

Consolation semifinals
F4	Netherlands	55
F2	Slovenia	66
F1	Czech Republic	68
F3	Belgium	56

Quarterfinals
E1	France	89
F4	Netherlands	32
F2	Slovenia	80
E3	Russia	89
F1	Czech Republic	46
E4	Italy	63
E2	Spain	59
F3	Belgium	53

Semifinals
E1	France	62
E3	Russia	59
E4	Italy	56
E2	Spain	66

Final
E1	France	60
E2	Spain	76
Third place
E3	Russia	71
E4	Italy	52

=== Quarterfinals ===
7 August 2015
14:00

Boxscore

France	89–32	Netherlands
Scoring by quarter: 22–10, 20–9, 26–8, 21–5
Pts: Tadic 16; Rebs: Chartereau 12; Asts: Duchet 9		Pts: Westerik 6 Rebs: van Schie 5 Asts: Westerik 2

Zlatorog Sport Centre, (Slovenia) Celje
Attendance: 150
Referees: Ilona Kucerova (CZE), Milan Adamovic (BIH), Csaba Cziffra (HUN)

7 August 2015
16:15

Boxscore

Spain	59–53	Belgium
Scoring by quarter: 25–15, 18–13, 11–13, 5–12
Pts: Salvadores, Conde 18; Rebs: Conde 17; Asts: Conde 6		Pts: Maesschalck, Geldof 12; Rebs: Geldof, Ramette 7 Asts: Ramette 5

Zlatorog Sport Centre, (Slovenia) Celje
Attendance: 200
Referees: Andris Aunkrogers (LAT), Mart Uuehendrik (EST), Joske Kuut (NED)

7 August 2015
18:30

Boxscore

Slovenia	80–89	Russia
Scoring by quarter: 14–24, 21–16, 12–28, 33–21
Pts: Prezelj 23; Rebs: Gwashavanhu 10; Asts: Prezelj 5		Pts: Musina 25; Rebs: Musina, Safonova 12; Asts: Safonova, Gorshkova 5

Zlatorog Sport Centre, (Slovenia) Celje
Attendance: 1200
Referees: Emin Mogulkoc (TUR), Dragan Kralj (BIH), Susana Gómez López (ESP)

7 August 2015
20:45

Boxscore

Czech Republic	46–63	Italy
Scoring by quarter: 9–23, 15–12, 13–10, 9–18
Pts: Sípová 17; Rebs: Soukalová, Heroschova 8 Asts: Holesínská 2		Pts: Pan 14; Rebs: Ciavarella 6 Asts: 3 tied with 2

Zlatorog Sport Centre, (Slovenia) Celje
Attendance: 100
Referees: Carole Delauné (FRA), Milan Nedovic (SLO), Alexey Chudin (RUS)

=== Classification games for 5th – 8th place ===
8 August 2015
14:00

Boxscore

Netherlands	55–66	Slovenia
Scoring by quarter: 18–21, 13–9, 14–23, 10–13
Pts: den Heeten 11; Rebs: Ndiba 14; Asts: Ndiba 5		Pts: Friskovec 19; Rebs: Gwashavanhu 16; Asts: Potocnik 5

Zlatorog Sport Centre, (Slovenia) Celje
Attendance: 250
Referees: Jasmina Juras (SRB), Carole Delauné (FRA), Csaba Cziffra (HUN)

8 August 2015
16:15

Boxscore

Czech Republic	68–56	Belgium
Scoring by quarter: 20–12, 16–18, 20–12, 12–14
Pts: Sípová 17; Rebs: Reisingerová 9 Asts: Malecková 4		Pts: Maesschalck 12; Rebs: Ramette, Geldof 8 Asts: Ramette 5

Zlatorog Sport Centre, (Slovenia) Celje
Attendance: 140
Referees: Milan Nedovic (SLO), Mindaugas Vecerskis (LTU), Svetlana Stoyanova (BUL)

=== Semifinals ===
Winners of this round moves on to the Final; while the losers contest for the bronze medal.

8 August 2015
18:30

Boxscore

Italy	56–66	Spain
Scoring by quarter: 13–14, 15–18, 10–11, 18–23
Pts: Santucci 15; Rebs: Santucci, Ortolani 7 Asts: Santucci 3		Pts: Conde 20; Rebs: I. López 16; Asts: Cazorla 4

Zlatorog Sport Centre, (Slovenia) Celje
Attendance: 200
Referees: Emin Mogulkoc (TUR), Dragan Kralj (BIH), Jelena Tomic (CRO)

8 August 2015
20:45

Boxscore

France	62–59	Russia
Scoring by quarter: 18–19, 19–12, 15–12, 10–16
Pts: Berkani 23; Rebs: Berkani, Tadic 10; Asts: Duchet 5		Pts: Frolkina 12; Rebs: Musina 17; Asts: Safonova, Frolkina 3

Zlatorog Sport Centre, (Slovenia) Celje
Attendance: 300
Referees: Andris Aunkrogers (LAT), Maka Kupatadze (GEO), Martin Horozov (BUL)

== Final classification games ==
=== Match for 15th place ===
9 August 2015
11:30

Boxscore

Estonia	49–60	Portugal
Scoring by quarter: 9–18, 10–21, 17–6, 13–15
Pts: Tael 12; Rebs: Uiga 15; Asts: Adelbert, Viirmaa 3		Pts: Kostourkova 17; Rebs: Kostourkova 8 Asts: Bernardeco 7

Golovec Sport Centre, Celje (Slovenia)
Attendance: 30
Referees: Milosav Kaludjerovic (MNE), Dariusz Zapolski (POL), Si-Man Alice Lei (MAC)

=== Match for 13th place ===
9 August 2015
16:00

Boxscore

Poland	41–46	Hungary
Scoring by quarter: 9–15, 9–9, 14–8, 9–14
Pts: Budkiewicz 13; Rebs: Puc 12; Asts: 3 tied with 2		Pts: Kiss, Aho 10; Rebs: Kiss, Kuttor 8 Asts: Aho 4

Golovec Sport Centre, Celje (Slovenia)
Attendance: 50
Referees: Emin Mogulkoc (TUR), Maka Kupatadze (GEO), Mindaugas Vecerskis (LTU)

=== Match for 11th place ===
9 August 2015
13:45

Boxscore

Israel	45–73	Serbia
Scoring by quarter: 11–18, 13–19, 13–20, 8–16
Pts: Rotberg 9 Rebs: Levy 8 Asts: Lavy, Grossman 3		Pts: Arsenic 20; Rebs: Nogić 8 Asts: Katanic 4

Golovec Sport Centre, Celje (Slovenia)
Attendance: 50
Referees: Mart Uuehendrik (EST), Milan Adamovic (BIH), Svetlana Stoyanova (BUL)

=== Match for 9th place ===
9 August 2015
18:15

Boxscore

Croatia	71–55	Lithuania
Scoring by quarter: 18–19, 16–10, 21–14, 16–12
Pts: Dojkić 32; Rebs: Stojsavljevic 7 Asts: Slonjsak 6		Pts: Juskaite 15; Rebs: Juskaite, Gudelionyte 6 Asts: Gudelionyte 2

Golovec Sport Centre, Celje (Slovenia)
Attendance: 50
Referees: Csaba Cziffra (HUN), Milosav Kaludjerovic (MNE), Kate Webb (ENG)

=== Match for 7th place ===
9 August 2015
13:30

Boxscore

Netherlands	50–58	Belgium
Scoring by quarter: 11–21, 20–11, 8–16, 11–10
Pts: Westerik 19; Rebs: Ndiba 11; Asts: 3 tied with 2		Pts: Ramette 15; Rebs: Geldof 8 Asts: Maesschalck 5

Zlatorog Sport Centre, Celje (Slovenia)
Attendance: 80
Referees: Dragan Kralj (BIH), Vasiliki Tsaroucha (GRE), Samira Barrima (POR)

=== Match for 5th place ===
9 August 2015
15:45

Boxscore

Slovenia	82–55	Czech Republic
Scoring by quarter: 24–6, 22–16, 14–18, 22–15
Pts: Prezelj 23; Rebs: Gwashavanhu 8 Asts: Potocnik 5		Pts: Krejzová 13; Rebs: Sipová 7 Asts: Soukalová, Reisingerová 3

Zlatorog Sport Centre, Celje (Slovenia)
Attendance: 450
Referees: Andris Aunkrogers (LAT), Jelena Tomic (CRO), Martin Horozov (BUL)

=== Bronze medal match ===
9 August 2015
18:00

Boxscore

Russia	71–52	Italy
Scoring by quarter: 17–7, 24–11, 16–15, 14–19
Pts: Safonova, Burovaya 11; Rebs: Musina 10; Asts: Musina, Burovaya 4		Pts: Pan 25; Rebs: Zecchin, Keys 7 Asts: Porcu 3

Zlatorog Sport Centre, Celje (Slovenia)
Attendance: 200
Referees: Carole Delauné (FRA), Susana Gómez López (ESP), Ilona Kucerova (CZE)

=== Final ===
9 August 2015
20:15

Boxscore

France	60–76	Spain
Scoring by quarter: 16–10, 11–25, 19–20, 14–21
Pts: Chartereau 15; Rebs: Djaldi-Tabdi 12; Asts: Duchet 6		Pts: Salvadores 27; Rebs: Conde 16; Asts: Salvadores 4

Zlatorog Sport Centre, Celje (Slovenia)
Attendance: 700
Referees: Jasmina Juras (SRB), Milan Nedovic (SLO), Alexey Chudin (RUS)

== Final standings ==
Rank	Team	Record
1st place, gold medalist(s) Gold	Spain	8–1
2nd place, silver medalist(s) Silver	France	8–1
3rd place, bronze medalist(s) Bronze	Russia	6–3
4th	Italy	4–5
5th	Slovenia	7–2
6th	Czech Republic	6–3
7th	Belgium	4–5
8th	Netherlands	3–6
9th	Croatia	6–3
10th	Lithuania	4–5
11th	Serbia	3–6
12th	Israel	2–7
13th	Hungary	4–5
14th	Poland	4–5
15th	Portugal	3–6
16th	Estonia	0–9

2015 FIBA Europe Under-18 Championship for Women
Winners

Spain
Fifth title

Team relegated to the 2016 FIBA U18 Women's European Championship Division B

== Awards ==
Most Valuable Player
(Spain) Ángela Salvadores

All-Tournament Team

- (Spain) Ángela Salvadores (MVP)
- (France) Lisa Berkani
- (France) Alexia Chartereau
- (Italy) Francesca Pan
- (Russia) Raisa Musina
