= Belgium at the 2024 Summer Olympics =

- IOC code: BEL
- NOC: Belgian Olympic and Interfederal Committee
- Website: www.teambelgium.be (in Dutch and French)

in Paris, France 26 July 2024 – 11 August 2024
- Competitors: 165 (83 men and 82 women) in 21 sports
- Flag bearers (opening): Jérôme Guéry & Emma Meesseman
- Flag bearer (closing): Nafissatou Thiam
- Medals Ranked 25th: Gold 3 Silver 1 Bronze 6 Total 10

Summer Olympics appearances (overview)
- 1900; 1904; 1908; 1912; 1920; 1924; 1928; 1932; 1936; 1948; 1952; 1956; 1960; 1964; 1968; 1972; 1976; 1980; 1984; 1988; 1992; 1996; 2000; 2004; 2008; 2012; 2016; 2020; 2024; 2028

Other related appearances
- 1906 Intercalated Games

Belgium competed at the 2024 Summer Olympics in Paris from 26 July to 11 August 2024. Since the country's debut in 1900, Belgian athletes have appeared in every edition of the Summer Olympic Games except for the 1904 edition.

== Medalists ==
Medal	Name	Sport	Event	Date
Gold	Remco Evenepoel	Cycling	Men's road time trial	27 July
Gold	Remco Evenepoel	Cycling	Men's road race	3 August
Gold	Nafissatou Thiam	Athletics	Women's heptathlon	9 August
Silver	Bashir Abdi	Athletics	Men's marathon	10 August
Bronze	Wout van Aert	Cycling	Men's road time trial	27 July
Bronze	Gabriella Willems	Judo	Women's 70 kg	31 July
Bronze	Lotte Kopecky	Cycling	Women's road race	4 August
Bronze	Fabio Van den Bossche	Cycling	Men's omnium	8 August
Bronze	Noor Vidts	Athletics	Women's heptathlon	9 August
Bronze	Sarah Chaâri	Taekwondo	Women's 67 kg	9 August

Medals by sport
Sport	1st place, gold medalist(s)	2nd place, silver medalist(s)	3rd place, bronze medalist(s)	Total
Athletics	1	1	1	3
Cycling	2	0	3	5
Judo	0	0	1	1
Taekwando	0	0	1	1
Total	3	1	6	10

Medals by gender
Gender	1st place, gold medalist(s)	2nd place, silver medalist(s)	3rd place, bronze medalist(s)	Total
Male	2	1	2	5
Female	1	0	4	5
Mixed	0	0	0	0
Total	3	1	6	10

Medals by date
Date	1st place, gold medalist(s)	2nd place, silver medalist(s)	3rd place, bronze medalist(s)	Total
27 July	1	0	1	2
31 July	0	0	1	1
3 August	1	0	0	1
4 August	0	0	1	1
8 August	0	0	1	1
9 August	1	0	2	3
10 August	0	1	0	1
Total	3	1	6	10

Multiple medalists
Name	Sport	1st place, gold medalist(s)	2nd place, silver medalist(s)	3rd place, bronze medalist(s)	Total
Remco Evenepoel	Cycling	2	0	0	2

== Competitors ==
On July 6, 2024, Team Belgium announced a 172 strong squad (not including 8 reserves), composed of 87 men and 85 women. The following is the list of number of competitors in the Games.

Sport	Men	Women	Total
Athletics	23	20	43
Badminton	1	1	2
Basketball	0	12	12
Boxing	2	1	3
Canoeing	1	2	3
Cycling	11	10	21
Equestrian	5	5	10
Fencing	1	0	1
Field hockey	19	19	38
Golf	2	1	3
Gymnastics	3	2	5
Judo	3	1	4
Rowing	3	0	3
Sailing	4	4	8
Sport climbing	1	0	1
Swimming	1	3	4
Table tennis	2	0	2
Taekwondo	0	1	1
Tennis	3	0	3
Triathlon	2	2	4
Weightlifting	0	1	1
Total	87	85	172

== Athletics ==
Belgian track and field athletes achieved the entry standards for Paris 2024, either by passing the direct qualifying mark (or time for track and road races) or by world ranking, in the following events (a maximum of 3 athletes each):

Key

- Note–Ranks given for track events are within the athlete's heat only
- Q = Qualified for the next round
- q = Qualified for the next round as a fastest loser or, in field events, by position without achieving the qualifying target
- L = First lane infringement
- NR = National record
- DNS = Did not start
- DNF = Did not finish
- DSQ = Disqualified
- N/A = Round not applicable for the event
- Bye = Athlete not required to compete in round

Track and road events

Athlete	Event	Preliminary		Heat		Repechage		Semifinal		Final	
Athlete	Event	Time	Rank	Time	Rank	Time	Rank	Time	Rank	Time	Rank
Dylan Borlée	Men's 400 m	—N/a		45.36	5	45.51	4	Did not advance			
Alexander Doom	Men's 400 m	—N/a		45.01	2 Q	Bye		DNF		Did not advance	
Jonathan Sacoor	Men's 400 m	—N/a		45.08	4	DNS		Did not advance			
Eliott Crestan	Men's 800 m	—N/a		1:45.51	1 Q	Bye		1:43.72	5	Did not advance	
Tibo De Smet	Men's 800 m	—N/a		1:46.03	7	1:46.59	4	Did not advance			
Pieter Sisk	Men's 800 m	—N/a		1:46.60	6	1:45.49	3	Did not advance			
Ruben Verheyden	Men's 1500 m	—N/a		3:36.62	12	3:36.06	10	Did not advance			
Jochem Vermeulen	Men's 1500 m	—N/a		3:36.66	7	3:36.14	6	Did not advance			
John Heymans	Men's 5000 m	—N/a		14:08.33	3 Q	—N/a				13:19.25	11
Isaac Kimeli	Men's 5000 m	—N/a		13:52.18	3 Q	—N/a				13:18.10	8
Isaac Kimeli	Men's 10000 m	—N/a								27:51.52	19
Michael Obasuyi	110 m hurdles	—N/a		13.41	3 Q	Bye		13.36	5	Did not advance	
Elie Bacari	110 m hurdles	—N/a		13.66	7	14.13	7	Did not advance			
Dylan Borlée; Kevin Borlée; Florent Mabille; Jonathan Sacoor	Men's 4 × 400 m relay	—N/a		2:59.84 =SB	2 Q	—N/a				2:57.75 NR	4
Bashir Abdi	Men's marathon	—N/a								2:06:47 SB	2nd place, silver medalist(s)
Koen Naert	Men's marathon	—N/a								2:16:33 SB	61
Michael Somers	Men's marathon	—N/a								2:10:32	22
Delphine Nkansa	Women's 100 m	Bye		11.20 =PB	3 Q	Bye		11.28	7	Did not advance	
Rani Rosius	Women's 100 m	Bye		11.10 PB	4 q	Bye		11.29	8	Did not advance	
Imke Vervaet	Women's 200 m	—N/a		23.20	7	23.33	3	Did not advance			
Cynthia Bolingo	Women's 400 m	—N/a		52.77 SB	8	DNS		Did not advance			
Helena Ponette	Women's 400 m	—N/a		51.75	6	51.46 PB	5	Did not advance			
Elise Vanderelst	Women's 1500 m	—N/a		4:06.95	9	4:08.86	7	Did not advance			
Lisa Rooms	Women's 5000 m	—N/a		15:37.55	15	—N/a				Did not advance	
Hanne Claes	Women's 400 m hurdles	—N/a		54.80 SB	4q	Bye		55.96	8	Did not advance	
Paulien Couckuyt	Women's 400 m hurdles	—N/a		54.90 SB	4q	Bye		54.64 SB	5	Did not advance	
Naomi Van den Broeck	Women's 400 m hurdles	—N/a		55.51 L	5	55.11	2 Q	54.94	6	Did not advance	
Chloé Herbiet	Women's marathon	—N/a								DNF	
Hanne Verbruggen	Women's marathon	—N/a								2:29:03 SB	19
Elise Mehuys; Delphine Nkansa; Rani Rosius; Rani Vincke	Women's 4 × 100 m relay	—N/a		DSQ		—N/a				Did not advance	
Hanne Claes; Camille Laus; Helena Ponette; Naomi Van den Broeck; Imke Vervaet	Women's 4 × 400 m relay	—N/a		3:24.92	4 q	—N/a				3:22.40 SB	7
Kevin Borlée; Alexander Doom; Jonathan Sacoor; Helena Ponette; Naomi Van den Broeck	Mixed 4 × 400 m relay	—N/a		3:10.74 NR	3 Q	—N/a				3:09.36 NR	4

Field events

Athlete	Event	Qualification		Final	
Athlete	Event	Distance	Position	Distance	Position
Thomas Carmoy	Men's high jump	2.20	19	Did not advance	
Ben Broeders	Men's pole vault	5.60	15	Did not advance	
Philip Milanov	Men's discus throw	62.44	15	Did not advance	
Timothy Herman	Men's javelin throw	79.42	20	Did not advance	
Vanessa Sterckendries	Women's hammer throw	67.67	24	Did not advance	

Combined events – Women's heptathlon

Athlete	Event	100H	HJ	SP	200 m	LJ	JT	800 m	Final	Rank
Nafissatou Thiam	Result	13.56	1.92	15.54 =PB	24.46 SB	6.41	54.04 SB	2:10.62 PB	6880 SB	1st place, gold medalist(s)
Nafissatou Thiam	Points	1041	1132	897	937	978	939	956	6880 SB	1st place, gold medalist(s)
Noor Vidts	Result	13.10 PB	1.83	14.57	23.86	6.40	45.00 PB	2:06.38 PB	6707 PB	3rd place, bronze medalist(s)
Noor Vidts	Points	1109	1016	832	994	975	763	1018	6707 PB	3rd place, bronze medalist(s)

== Badminton ==
Belgium entered two badminton players into the Olympic tournament based on the BWF Race to Paris Rankings.

Athlete	Event	Group stage				Round of 16	Quarter-final	Semi-final	Final / BM	
Athlete	Event	Opposition Score	Opposition Score	Opposition Score	Rank	Opposition Score	Opposition Score	Opposition Score	Opposition Score	Rank
Julien Carraggi	Men's singles	Christie (INA); L (18–21, 21–11, 21–16)	Sen (IND); L (21–19, 21–14)	Cordón (GUA) -	3	Bye	Did not advance			27
Lianne Tan	Women's singles	Tai (TPE); L (21–15, 21–14)	Intanon (THA); L (21–8, 21–8)	—N/a	3	Bye	Did not advance			27

== Basketball ==
=== 5×5 basketball ===
Summary

Team	Event	Group stage				Quarterfinal	Semifinal	Final / BM	
Team	Event	Opposition Score	Opposition Score	Opposition Score	Rank	Opposition Score	Opposition Score	Opposition Score	Rank
Belgium women's	Women's tournament	Germany; L 69–83	United States; L 74–87	Japan; W 85–58	3q	Spain; W 66–79	France; L 81–75 (OT)	Australia; L 81–85	4

==== Women's tournament ====
The Belgium women's national basketball team qualified for the Olympics by finishing in the top two eligible nations at the 2024 Olympic Qualifying Tournaments in Antwerp.

Team roster

A 14-player roster was announced on 24 May 2024. The final roster was revealed on 6 July 2024.

Belgium women's national basketball team – 2024 Summer Olympics roster
Players
Coaches

Pos.	No.	Name	Age – Date of birth	Height	Club	Ctr.
PG	4	Elise Ramette	25 – 3 November 1998	1.77 m (5 ft 10 in)	AE Sedis Bàsquet	(Spain)
SF	6	Antonia Delaere	29 – 1 August 1994	1.82 m (6 ft 0 in)	CB Avenida	(Spain)
SF	10	Laure Résimont	26 – 29 January 1998	1.85 m (6 ft 1 in)	Kangoeroes Basket Mechelen	(Belgium)
PF	11	Emma Meesseman (C)	31 – 13 May 1993	1.93 m (6 ft 4 in)	Fenerbahçe	(Turkey)
C	13	Kyara Linskens	27 – 13 November 1996	1.93 m (6 ft 4 in)	Lattes Montpellier	(France)
PF	15	Nastja Claessens	19 – 2 December 2004	1.84 m (6 ft 0 in)	KBT ION Waregem	(Belgium)
SF	22	Bethy Mununga	27 – 22 July 1997	1.83 m (6 ft 0 in)	ESB Villeneuve-d'Ascq	(France)
C	25	Becky Massey	24 – 21 March 2000	1.86 m (6 ft 1 in)	IDK Euskotren	(Spain)
SF	31	Maxuelle Lisowa-Mbaka	23 – 14 May 2001	1.78 m (5 ft 10 in)	ESB Villeneuve-d'Ascq	(France)
C	34	Billie Massey	24 – 21 March 2000	1.86 m (6 ft 1 in)	CB Estudiantes	(Spain)
PG	35	Julie Vanloo	31 – 10 February 1993	1.68 m (5 ft 6 in)	Washington Mystics	(United States)
F	99	Ine Joris	23 – 25 July 2001	1.83 m (6 ft 0 in)	BC Castors Braine	(Belgium)

Head coach

- (France) Rachid Meziane

Legend

- (C) Team captain
- Club – describes last
  club before the tournament
- Age – describes age
  on 28 July 2024

Group play

Pos	Team	Pld	W	L	PF	PA	PD	Pts	Qualification
1	United States	3	3	0	276	218	+58	6	Quarterfinals
2	Germany	3	2	1	226	220	+6	5	Quarterfinals
3	Belgium	3	1	2	228	228	0	4	Quarterfinals
4	Japan	3	0	3	198	262	−64	3	

Source: FIBA
Rules for classification: 1) classification points; 2) head-to-head results; 3) head-to-head game points difference; 4) head-to-head number of game points scored.

29 July 2024
13:30

Boxscore

Germany	83–69	Belgium
Scoring by quarter: 25–11, 21–14, 14–17, 23–27
Pts: S. Sabally 17; Rebs: Gülich 7 Asts: Peterson 8		Pts: Meesseman 25; Rebs: Linskens 6 Asts: Vanloo 6

Stade Pierre-Mauroy, Lille
Attendance: 20,211
Referees: Martin Vulić (CRO), Carlos Peralta (ECU), Yann Davidson (MAD)

1 August 2024
21:00

Boxscore

Belgium	74–87	United States
Scoring by quarter: 23–23, 15–23, 15–14, 21–27
Pts: Meesseman 24; Rebs: Delaere, Linskens 5 Asts: Delaere 8		Pts: Stewart 26; Rebs: Wilson 13; Asts: Ionescu 5

Stade Pierre-Mauroy, Lille
Attendance: 25,044
Referees: Wojciech Liszka (POL), Luis Castillo (ESP), Ariadna Chueca (ESP)

4 August 2024
11:00

Boxscore

Japan	58–85	Belgium
Scoring by quarter: 7–19, 16–20, 16–22, 19–24
Pts: Hayashi 13; Rebs: Akaho 5 Asts: Machida, Miyazaki 4		Pts: Meesseman 30; Rebs: Meesseman 11; Asts: Massey 7

Stade Pierre-Mauroy, Lille
Attendance: 25,134
Referees: Boris Krejić (SLO), Wojciech Liszka (POL), Péter Praksch (HUN)

Quarterfinal

7 August 2024
14:30

Boxscore

Spain	66–79	Belgium
Scoring by quarter: 26–26, 11–22, 12–19, 17–12
Pts: Gustafson 21; Rebs: Gustafson 7 Asts: Gil, Ortiz 3		Pts: Linskens, Meesseman 19; Rebs: Meesseman 9 Asts: Delaere, Vanloo 7

Accor Arena, Paris
Attendance: 11,852
Referees: Matthew Kallio (CAN), Jenna Reneau (USA), Maripier Malo (CAN)

Semifinal

9 August 2024
21:00

Boxscore

France	81–75 (OT)	Belgium
Scoring by quarter: 14–17, 17–19, 17–15, 18–15, Overtime: 15–9
Pts: Williams 18; Rebs: Badiane, Rupert 7 Asts: Johannès 5		Pts: Meesseman 19; Rebs: Meesseman 14; Asts: three players 6

Accor Arena, Paris
Attendance: 12,389
Referees: Luis Castillo (ESP), Takaki Kato (JPN), Ariadna Chueca (ESP)

Bronze medal game

11 August 2024
11:30

Boxscore

Belgium	81–85	Australia
Scoring by quarter: 19–20, 17–17, 25–23, 20–25
Pts: Vanloo 26; Rebs: Linskens 8 Asts: Vanloo 11		Pts: Magbegor 30; Rebs: Magbegor 13; Asts: Melbourne 7

Accor Arena, Paris
Attendance: 11,968
Referees: Amy Bonner (USA), Blanca Burns (USA), Jenna Reneau (USA)

== Boxing ==
Belgium entered three boxers into the Olympic tournament for the first time since Barcelona 1992. Romanian-born Vasile Usturoi (men's featherweight), with Oshin Derieuw (women's welterweight) slated to become the country's first female boxer in history at the Games, secured the spots on the Belgian squad in their respective weight divisions by advancing to the semifinal match at the 2023 European Games in Nowy Targ, Poland. Victor Schelstraete (men's heavyweight) secured his spot following the triumph in quota bouts round, at the 2024 World Olympic Qualification Tournament 2 in Bangkok, Thailand.

Athlete	Event	Round of 32	Round of 16	Quarterfinals	Semifinals	Final	
Athlete	Event	Opposition Result	Opposition Result	Opposition Result	Opposition Result	Opposition Result	Rank
Vasile Usturoi	Men's 57 kg	Bye	Senior (AUS); L 1–4	Did not advance			9
Victor Schelstraete	Men's 92 kg	—N/a	Plodzicki-Faoagali (SAM); W 5–0	Reyes (ESP); L 0–5	Did not advance		5
Oshin Derieuw	Women's 66 kg	Bye	Romeira (CPV); W 3–2	Yang (CHN); L 0–5	Did not advance		5

== Canoeing ==
=== Sprint ===
Belgium qualified a boat in the Men's K-1 1000 m and the Women's K-2 500 m for the Games by finishing sixth resp. fourth at the 2023 ICF Canoe Sprint World Championships in Duisburg, Germany. Both athletes having secured a quota place in the Women's K-2 500 m are eligible to compete in the Women's K-1 500 m.

Athlete	Event	Heats		Quarterfinals		Semifinals		Final	
Athlete	Event	Time	Rank	Time	Rank	Time	Rank	Time	Rank
Artuur Peters	Men's K-1 1000 m	3:31.55	4 QF	3:51.20	6	3:32.81	6 FB	3:30.29	13
Lize Broekx	Women's K-1 500 m	1:52.32	5 QF	1:49.78	1 SF	1:52.84	4 FB	1:53.67	14
Hermien Peters	Women's K-1 500 m	1:51.46	2 SF	Bye		1:49.87	2 FA	1:52.26	7
Lize Broekx; Hermien Peters	Women's K-2 500 m	1:41.80	2 SF	Bye		1:39.74	2 FA	1:39.84	5

Qualification Legend: QF = Qualify to quarterfinal; SF = Qualify to semifinal; FA = Qualify to final (medal); FB = Qualify to final B (non-medal)
Artuur Peters was impeded by an obstruction on the course during his Quarterfinal. At the time that he was obstructed, he was in first place. Pursuant to rule 7.3.1, the Chief Official has exercised his discretion to include this athlete in a spare lane in the Semifinals.

== Cycling ==
=== Road ===
Belgium entered a full team of eight road cyclists (four per gender). Belgium qualified four male athletes by finishing 1st in the UCI Nation Ranking, while the women qualified four athletes, by finishing 3rd.

Men

Athlete	Event	Time	Rank
Remco Evenepoel	Road race	6:19:34	1st place, gold medalist(s)
Jasper Stuyven	Road race	6:21:54	21
Wout Van Aert	Road race	6:23:21	37
Tiesj Benoot	Road race	6:26:57	48
Remco Evenepoel	Time trial	36:12.16	1st place, gold medalist(s)
Wout Van Aert	Time trial	36:37.79	3rd place, bronze medalist(s)

Women

Athlete	Event	Time	Rank
Justine Ghekiere	Road race	4:04:23	24
Lotte Kopecky	Road race	4:00:21	3rd place, bronze medalist(s)
Julie Van de Velde	Road race	4:07:21	53
Margot Vanpachtenbeke	Road race	4:07:16	43
Lotte Kopecky	Time trial	41:34.82	6

=== Track ===
Results from the final leg of the 2024 UCI Track Cycling Nations Cup events in Milton ensured that the Belgium men's team pursuit team could not finish below tenth overall in the team pursuit world rankings, and were thus guaranteed a quota in all three men's track endurance events in Paris. The Belgium women's madison team secured a quota for the women's madison and omnium by securing a top 5 place in the 2022–2024 UCI Track Olympic Ranking of NOC's not having obtained a quota via the team pursuit world rankings and two quota for the women's sprint and keirin tournaments by a top 7 place in the 2022–2024 UCI Track Olympic Ranking of NOC's not having obtained a quota via the team sprint world rankings.

Sprint

Athlete	Event	Qualification		Round 1	Repechage 1	Round 2	Repechage 2	Round 3	Repechage 3	Quarterfinals	Semifinals	Finals / BM	
Athlete	Event	Time Speed (km/h)	Rank	Opposition Time Speed (km/h)	Opposition Time Speed (km/h)	Opposition Time Speed (km/h)	Opposition Time Speed (km/h)	Opposition Time Speed (km/h)	Opposition Time Speed (km/h)	Opposition Time Speed (km/h)	Opposition Time Speed (km/h)	Opposition Time Speed (km/h)	Rank
Nicky Degrendele	Women's sprint	Did not start											
Julie Nicolaes	Women's sprint	10.809 PB	24 Q	Friedrich (GER); L	Vece (ITA); Gaxiola (MEX); L	Did not advance							

Team Pursuit

Athlete	Event	Qualification		Semifinals		Final	
Athlete	Event	Time	Rank	Opponent Results	Rank	Opponent Results	Rank
Tuur Dens; Lindsay De Vylder; Fabio Van den Bossche; Noah Vandenbranden	Men's team pursuit	3:47.232 NR	7 Q	New Zealand; L 3:45.685 NR	2 Q7-8	Canada; L Overlapped	8

OVL = Overlapped

Keirin

Athlete	Event	Round 1	Repechage	Quarterfinals	Semifinals	Final
Athlete	Event	Rank	Rank	Rank	Rank	Rank
Nicky Degrendele	Women's keirin	1 Q	Bye	3 Q1/2	4 Q7-12	11
Julie Nicolaes	Women's keirin	5	3	Did not advance		

Omnium

Athlete	Event	Scratch race		Tempo race		Elimination race		Points race		Total	
Athlete	Event	Rank	Points	Rank	Points	Rank	Points	Rank	Points	Points	Rank
Fabio Van den Bossche	Men's omnium	3	36	1	40	6	30	25	6	131	3rd place, bronze medalist(s)
Lotte Kopecky	Women's omnium	17	8	6	30	4	34	3	44	116	4

Madison

Athlete	Event	Sprint Points	Lap Points	Total Points	Rank
Lindsay De Vylder; Fabio Van den Bossche	Men's madison	9	(−20)	(−11)	10
Katrijn De Clercq; Hélène Hesters	Women's madison	5	0	5	10

=== Mountain biking ===
Belgian mountain bikers qualified for two men's quota places into the Olympic cross-country race, as a result of the nation's seventh-place-finish for men in the biennial UCI Mountain Bike Olympic Qualification period ranking; and for one women's quota place as a result of the re-allocation of unused quota places.

Athlete	Event	Time	Rank
Jens Schuermans	Men's cross-country	1:33:29	26
Pierre de Froidmont	Men's cross-country	1:30:21	18
Emeline Detilleux	Women's cross-country	-1 LAP	25

=== BMX ===
==== Race ====
Belgium secured two quota places (one men's and one women's) race for Paris 2024 through the allocations of final Olympic BMX ranking.

Athlete	Event	Quarterfinal		Last Chance Race		Semifinal		Final	
Athlete	Event	Points	Rank	Time	Rank	Points	Rank	Result	Rank
Ruben Gommers	Men's	15	13 q	1:36.250	7	Did not advance			19
Aiko Gommers	Women's	19	19 q	37.819	5	Did not advance			17

== Equestrian ==
Belgium entered a full squad of equestrian riders to the dressage competition by finishing 8th at the 2023 FEI European Dressage Championships in Riesenbeck, Germany, picking up one of the three qualifying spots on offer at the event for the Paris 2024 Olympic Games with six of the top 8 teams already qualifying earlier in the 2022 FEI World Championships. Belgium entered a full squad of equestrian riders to the eventing competition by finishing 7th at the 2023 European Eventing Championships in Le Pin-au-Haras, France, picking up one of the two qualifying spots on offer for the Paris 2024 Olympic Games. Belgium entered a full squad of equestrian riders to the jumping competition by winning the gold medal at the 2022 Jumping Nations Cup Final in Barcelona, Spain.

=== Dressage ===
Athlete	Horse	Event	Grand Prix		Grand Prix Special		Grand Prix Freestyle	
Athlete	Horse	Event	Score	Rank	Score	Rank	Score	Rank
Flore de Winne	Flynn FRH	Individual	73.028	19	—N/a		Did not advance	
Domien Michiels	Intermezzo Van Het Meerdaalhof	Individual	72.531	22	—N/a		Did not advance	
Larissa Pauluis	Flambeau	Individual	72.127	23	—N/a		Did not advance	
Flore de Winne; Domien Michiels; Larissa Pauluis	See above	Team	217.686	6 Q	143.33	10	—N/a	

Domien Michiels was disqualified after the event by the International Testing Agency of his individual competition results at the Dressage Team Grand Prix event at the Paris Olympic Games as a consequence for an anti-doping rule violation for the presence of a prohibited substance, dropping the Belgium team from 5th to 10th.

=== Eventing ===
Athlete	Horse	Event	Dressage		Cross-country			Jumping						Total	
Athlete	Horse	Event	Dressage		Cross-country			Qualifier			Final			Total	
Athlete	Horse	Event	Penalties	Rank	Penalties	Total	Rank	Penalties	Total	Rank	Penalties	Total	Rank	Penalties	Rank
Lara de Liedekerke-Meier	Origi	Individual	30.00	23	1.20	31.20	13	4.40	35.60	17 Q	0.00	35.60	13	35.60	13
Karin Donckers	Leipheimer van't Verahof	Individual	26.60	13	7.20	33.80	21	4.00	37.80	18 Q	0.40	38.20	16	38.20	16
Tine Magnus	Dia van het Lichterveld Z	Individual	44.00	61	2.00	46.00	34	4.00	50.00	28	Did not advance				28
Lara de Liedekerke-Meier; Karin Donckers; Tine Magnus	See above	Team	~~100.60~~	~~10~~	~~10.40~~	~~111.00~~	~~5~~	~~12.40~~	~~123.40~~	~~4~~	—N/a			~~123.40~~	~~4~~

The Belgium team was disqualified from the Eventing team competition of the Paris Olympic Games after an adverse analytical finding (AAF) involving an equine prohibited substance was returned for Tine Magnus' horse.

=== Jumping ===
Athlete	Horse	Event	Qualification		Final		
Athlete	Horse	Event	Penalties	Rank	Penalties	Time	Rank
Jérôme Guéry	Quel Homme de Hus	Individual	4	35	Did not advance		
Gilles Thomas	Ermitage Kalone	Individual	0	15 Q	8	83.95	20
Gregory Wathelet	Bond Jamesbond de Hay	Individual	4	23 Q	8	78.76	15
Jérôme Guéry; Gilles Thomas; Wilm Vermeir	Quel Homme de Hus; Ermitage Kalone; IQ van 't Steentje	Team	8	4 Q	20	234.82	8

== Fencing ==
For the first time since the nation's last participation at the 2016 games in Rio, Belgium entered one fencer into the Olympic competition. Neisser Loyola secured his quota place in men's individual épée event as one of two highest ranked individual fencers, eligible for the European zone through the release of the FIE Individual Adjusted Official Ranking for Paris 2024.

Athlete	Event	Round of 64	Round of 32	Round of 16	Quarterfinal	Semifinal	Final / BM	
Athlete	Event	Opposition Score	Opposition Score	Opposition Score	Opposition Score	Opposition Score	Opposition Score	Rank
Neisser Loyola	Men's épée	Bye	Bayard (SUI); W 9–15	Siklósi (HUN); W 13–14	El-Sayed (EGY); L 8–9	Did not advance		8

== Field hockey ==
Summary

Key:

- FT – After full-time.
- P – Match decided by penalty-shootout.

Team	Event	Group stage						Quarterfinal	Semifinal	Final / BM	
Team	Event	Opposition Score	Opposition Score	Opposition Score	Opposition Score	Opposition Score	Rank	Opposition Score	Opposition Score	Opposition Score	Rank
Belgium men's	Men's tournament	Ireland; W 2–0	New Zealand; W 2–1	Australia; W 6–2	India; W 1–2	Argentina; D 3–3	1	Spain; L 2–3	Did not advance		5
Belgium women's	Women's tournament	China; W 2–1	France; W 5–0	Japan; W 3–0	Netherlands; L 3–1	Germany; W 0–2	2	Spain; W 2–0	China; L 2–3^{P} FT: 1–1	Argentina; L 3–1^{P} FT: 2–2	4

=== Men's tournament ===
Belgium men's national field hockey team qualified for the Olympics by reaching the final at the 2024 Men's FIH Hockey Olympic Qualifiers in Valencia, Spain.

Team roster

Belgium announced their squad on 6 July 2024.

Head coach: (Netherlands) Michel van den Heuvel

No.	Pos.	Player	Date of birth (age)	Caps	Club
2	GK	Loic Van Doren	14 September 1996 (aged 27)	58	(Belgium) Dragons
3	FW	Thibeau Stockbroekx	20 July 2000 (aged 24)	39	(Netherlands) Oranje-Rood
4	DF	Arthur Van Doren	1 October 1994 (aged 29)	241	(Netherlands) Bloemendaal
7	MF	John-John Dohmen	24 January 1988 (aged 36)	475	(Belgium) Orée
8	FW	Florent van Aubel	25 October 1991 (aged 32)	295	(Netherlands) Pinoké
10	FW	Cédric Charlier	27 November 1987 (aged 36)	380	(Belgium) Racing
12	DF	Gauthier Boccard	26 August 1991 (aged 32)	298	(Belgium) Léopold
13	FW	Nicolas De Kerpel	23 March 1993 (aged 31)	124	(Belgium) Herakles
16	DF	Alexander Hendrickx	6 August 1993 (aged 30)	192	(Netherlands) Pinoké
19	MF	Félix Denayer (Captain)	31 January 1990 (aged 34)	396	(Belgium) Dragons
21	GK	Vincent Vanasch	21 December 1987 (aged 36)	283	(Belgium) Orée
23	DF	Arthur De Sloover	3 May 1997 (aged 27)	161	(Netherlands) Oranje-Rood
24	MF	Antoine Kina	13 February 1996 (aged 28)	120	(Belgium) Gantoise
25	DF	Loïck Luypaert	19 August 1991 (aged 32)	309	(Belgium) Braxgata
26	MF	Victor Wegnez	25 December 1995 (aged 28)	169	(Belgium) Racing
27	FW	Tom Boon	25 January 1990 (aged 34)	348	(Belgium) Léopold
29	DF	Maxime Van Oost	2 December 1999 (aged 24)	45	(Belgium) Waterloo Ducks
30	FW	Nelson Onana	1 March 2000 (aged 24)	35	(Belgium) Braxgata
31	MF	Arno Van Dessel	3 July 2003 (aged 21)	34	(Belgium) Herakles

Group play

Pos	Team	Pld	W	D	L	GF	GA	GD	Pts	Qualification
1	Belgium	5	4	1	0	15	7	+8	13	Advance to quarter-finals
2	India	5	3	1	1	10	7	+3	10	Advance to quarter-finals
3	Australia	5	3	0	2	12	10	+2	9	Advance to quarter-finals
4	Argentina	5	2	2	1	8	6	+2	8	Advance to quarter-finals
5	Ireland	5	1	0	4	4	9	−5	3	
6	New Zealand	5	0	0	5	4	14	−10	0	

Source: FIH
Rules for classification: 1) points; 2) matches won; 3) goal difference; 4) goals for; 5) head-to-head result; 6) field goals scored.

27 July 2024
10:30
v

Belgium	2–0	Ireland
Boon 25'; Hendrickx 49'	Report

Pitch 2
Umpires:
Sean Rapaport (RSA)
Gabriel Labate (ARG)

28 July 2024
17:30
v

Belgium	2–1	New Zealand
Hendrickx 8'; Van Aubel 44'	Report	Lane 43'

Pitch 2
Umpires:
Steve Rogers (AUS)
Dan Barstow (GBR)

30 July 2024
19:45
v

Australia	2–6	Belgium
Sharp 28'; Govers 44'	Report	Hendrickx 7'; Boon 15', 30', 57'; Van Aubel 35'; Kina 38'

Pitch 1
Umpires:
Marcin Grochal (POL)
Gareth Greenfield (NZL)

1 August 2024
10:00
v

India	1–2	Belgium
Abhishek 18'	Report	Stockbroekx 33'; Dohmen 44'

Pitch 1
Umpires:
Coen van Bunge (NED)
Zeke Newman (AUS)

2 August 2024
17:30
v

Belgium	3–3	Argentina
De Kerpel 34'; Hendrickx 52'; Stockbroekx 60'	Report	Casella 5'; Domene 45'; Rey 53'

Pitch 2
Umpires:
Steve Rogers (AUS)
Martin Madden (GBR)

Quarterfinal

4 August 2024
12:30
v

Belgium	2–3	Spain
De Sloover 41'; Hendrickx 58'	Report	Basterra 40'; Reyné 55'; Miralles 57'

Pitch 1
Umpires:
Gabriel Labate (ARG)
Jonas van 't Hek (NED)

=== Women's tournament ===
Belgium women's national field hockey team qualified for the Olympics by reaching the final at the 2024 Women's FIH Hockey Olympic Qualifiers in Valencia, Spain.

Team roster

The squad was announced on 17 June 2024.

Head coach: (Netherlands) Raoul Ehren

No.	Pos.	Player	Date of birth (age)	Caps	Club
3	FW	Justine Rasir	4 December 2001 (aged 22)	70	(Belgium) Racing
4	FW	Delphine Marien	27 March 2002 (aged 22)	37	(Belgium) Dragons
5		Abigail Raye	17 May 1991 (aged 33)	141	
6	FW	Charlotte Englebert	20 May 2001 (aged 23)	70	(Netherlands) Den Bosch
7	MF	Judith Vandermeiren	10 August 1994 (aged 29)	237	(Belgium) Braxgata
8	DF	Emma Puvrez	25 July 1997 (aged 27)	199	(Netherlands) Tilburg
9	FW	Emily White	20 September 2004 (aged 19)	22	(Belgium) Waterloo Ducks
13	MF	Alix Gerniers (Captain)	29 June 1993 (aged 31)	269	(Belgium) Gantoise
15	DF	Vanessa Blockmans	4 April 2002 (aged 22)	44	(Belgium) Waterloo Ducks
17	MF	Michelle Struijk	24 June 1998 (aged 26)	121	(Belgium) Gantoise
19	MF	Barbara Nelen (Captain)	20 August 1991 (aged 32)	324	(Belgium) Gantoise
21	GK	Aisling D'Hooghe	25 August 1994 (aged 29)	229	(Belgium) Waterloo Ducks
22	DF	Stéphanie Vanden Borre	14 September 1997 (aged 26)	186	(Belgium) Braxgata
26	DF	Lien Hillewaert	27 November 1997 (aged 26)	137	(Belgium) Braxgata
29	GK	Elodie Picard	8 September 1997 (aged 26)	49	(Belgium) Royal Antwerp
30	FW	Ambre Ballenghien	13 December 2000 (aged 23)	83	(Belgium) Gantoise
31	DF	Lucie Breyne	5 October 2000 (aged 23)	64	(Belgium) Waterloo Ducks
36	DF	Hélène Brasseur	4 January 2002 (aged 22)	59	(Belgium) Gantoise
40	MF	Camille Belis	23 October 2004 (aged 19)	33	(Belgium) Braxgata

Group play

Pos	Team	Pld	W	D	L	GF	GA	GD	Pts	Qualification
1	Netherlands	5	5	0	0	19	5	+14	15	Quarter-finals
2	Belgium	5	4	0	1	13	4	+9	12	Quarter-finals
3	Germany	5	3	0	2	12	7	+5	9	Quarter-finals
4	China	5	2	0	3	15	10	+5	6	Quarter-finals
5	Japan	5	1	0	4	2	15	−13	3	
6	France (H)	5	0	0	5	4	24	−20	0	

Source: FIH
Rules for classification: 1) points; 2) matches won; 3) goal difference; 4) goals for; 5) head-to-head result; 6) field goals scored.
(H) Hosts

28 July 2024
10:00
v

Belgium	2–1	China
Ballenghien 23'; Englebert 55'	Report	Chen Ya. 46'

Pitch 1
Umpires:
Hannah Harrison (GBR)
Amber Church (NZL)

29 July 2024
20:15
v

France	0–5	Belgium
	Report	Rasir 7'; Ballenghien 12', 52'; Gerniers 18'; Vanden Borre 37'

Pitch 2
Umpires:
Liu Xiaoying (CHN)
Raghu Prasad (IND)

31 July 2024
17:00
v

Belgium	3–0	Japan
Brasseur 28'; Englebert 29'; Ballenghien 52'	Report

Pitch 1
Umpires:
Gabriel Labate (ARG)
Ayanna McClean (TTO)

2 August 2024
12:45
v

Belgium	1–3	Netherlands
Ballenghien 35'	Report	Sanders 6'; Jansen 13'; Verschoor 30'

Pitch 1
Umpires:
Hannah Harrison (GBR)
Liu Xiaoying (CHN)

3 August 2024
19:45
v

Germany	0–2	Belgium
	Report	Struijk 13'; Ballenghien 17'

Pitch 1
Umpires:
Irene Presenqui (ARG)
Wanri Venter (RSA)

Quarterfinal

5 August 2024
20:00
v

Belgium	2–0	Spain
Marien 46'; Englebert 49'	Report

Pitch 1
Umpires:
Alison Keogh (IRE)
Ayanna McClean (TTO)

Semifinal

7 August 2024
19:00
v

Belgium	1–1	China
Puvrez 59'	Report; Penalty shootout report	Zou 18'
Penalties
Englebert (penalty shoot-out scored); Blockmans (penalty shoot-out scored); Ballenghien (penalty shoot-out missed); Rasir (penalty shoot-out missed); Marien (penalty shoot-out missed)	2–3	(penalty shoot-out missed) Chen Ya. (penalty shoot-out scored) He; (penalty shoot-out scored) Zou; (penalty shoot-out scored) Ma

Pitch 1
Umpires:
Amber Church (NZL)
Aleisha Neumann (AUS)

Bronze medal game

9 August 2024
14:00
v

(bronze) Argentina	2–2	Belgium
Gorzelany 22'; Albertarrio 27'	Report; Penalty shootout report	Puvrez 8'; Rasir 27'
Penalties
Casas (penalty shoot-out scored); Jankunas (penalty shoot-out missed); Díaz (penalty shoot-out scored); Cairo (penalty shoot-out scored)	3–1	(penalty shoot-out missed) Englebert; (penalty shoot-out missed) Blockmans; (penalty shoot-out scored) Rasir; (penalty shoot-out missed) Vanden Borre

Pitch 1
Umpires:
Amber Church (NZL)
Alison Keogh (IRE)

== Golf ==
Belgium entered three golfers into the Olympic tournament. Thomas Detry, Adrien Dumont de Chassart, and Manon De Roey; all qualified for the games, to compete in the individual competitions, based on their own position inside the top 60 eligible players on the IGF World Rankings.

Athlete	Event	Round 1	Round 2	Round 3	Round 4	Total		
Athlete	Event	Score	Score	Score	Score	Score	Par	Rank
Thomas Detry	Men's	71	63	69	69	272	−12	T9
Adrien Dumont de Chassart	Men's	70	70	70	73	283	−1	T40
Manon De Roey	Women's	72	75	71	72	290	+2	T29

== Gymnastics ==
=== Artistic ===
Belgium's men team earned the right to send an individual gymnast to the Games by finishing as one of the three strongest non-qualified nations at the 2023 World Artistic Gymnastics Championships. Luka Van den Keybus also officially booked his Olympic ticket at the same championships as one of the highest-ranked eight All-Around gymnasts who did not have a pathway to Paris as part of a qualified team. Noah Kuavita earned the one available individual Paris 2024 quota spot for the parallel bars at the 2023 World Artistic Gymnastics Championships. Nina Derwael booked her Olympic ticket for the Women's artistic individual all-around competition by winning one of the two 2024 quota places destined for the top two eligible gymnasts on balance beam at the conclusion of the 2024 FIG Apparatus World Cup series. Maellyse Brassart joins the Belgian squads by becoming the highest ranked eligible gymnast, through the 2024 European Women's Artistic Gymnastics Championships in Rimini, Italy.

Men
Individual

Athlete	Event	Qualification								Final							
Athlete	Event	Apparatus						Total	Rank	Apparatus						Total	Rank
Athlete	Event	F	PH	R	V	PB	HB	Total	Rank	F	PH	R	V	PB	HB	Total	Rank
Noah Kuavita	All-around	—N/a				13.700	11.866	—N/a									
Luka van den Keybus	All-around	13.533	12.266	12.700	14.166	13.033	13.400	79.098	37	Did not advance							
Glen Cuyle	All-around	—N/a		14.900 Q	—N/a												

Individual finals

Athlete	Event	Apparatus						Total	Rank
Athlete	Event	F	PH	R	V	PB	HB	Total	Rank
Glen Cuyle	Rings	—N/a		13.833	—N/a			13.833	8

Women
Individual

Athlete	Event	Qualification						Final					
Athlete	Event	Apparatus				Total	Rank	Apparatus				Total	Rank
Athlete	Event	V	UB	BB	F	Total	Rank	V	UB	BB	F	Total	Rank
Maellyse Brassart	All-around	13.300	13.766	11.600	12.533	51.199	37	Did not advance					
Nina Derwael	All-around	—N/a	14.733 Q	12.766	—N/a								

Individual finals

Athlete	Event	Apparatus				Total	Rank
Athlete	Event	V	UB	BB	F	Total	Rank
Nina Derwael	Uneven bars	—N/a	14.766	—N/a		14.766	4

== Judo ==
Belgium qualified four judokas for the following weight classes at the Games. Jorre Verstraeten (men's extra-lightweight, 60 kg), Matthias Casse (men's half-middleweight, 81 kg), Toma Nikiforov (men's heavyweight, 100 kg) and Gabriella Willems (women's middleweight, 70 kg) qualified via quota based on IJF World Ranking List and continental quota based on Olympic point rankings.

Athlete	Event	Round of 64	Round of 32	Round of 16	Quarterfinals	Semifinals	Repechage	Final / BM	
Athlete	Event	Opposition Result	Opposition Result	Opposition Result	Opposition Result	Opposition Result	Opposition Result	Opposition Result	Rank
Jorre Verstraeten	Men's −60 kg	Bye	Moreno (ESA); W 01–00	Garrigos (ESP); L 00–01	Did not advance				9
Matthias Casse	Men's −81 kg	—N/a	Arab (EOR); W 11–01	Ungvári (HUN); W 10–00	Nagase (JPN); L 00–01	Did not advance	Gauthier-Drapeau (CAN); W 01–00	Lee (KOR); L 00–01	5
Toma Nikiforov	Men's −100 kg	—N/a	Sharkhan (KAZ); L 10–00	Did not advance					17
Gabriella Willems	Women's −70 kg	—N/a	Perez (PUR); W 10–00	Teltsidou (GRE); W 10–00	Butkereit (GER); L 00–10	Did not advance	Gahié (FRA); W 10–00	van Dijke (NED); W 01–00	3rd place, bronze medalist(s)

== Rowing ==
Belgium male rowers have qualified a boat in the men's single and lightweight double sculls, through the 2024 World Rowing European Olympic Qualification Regatta in Szeged, Hungary.

Athlete	Event	Heats		Repechage		Quarterfinals		Semifinals		Final	
Athlete	Event	Time	Rank	Time	Rank	Time	Rank	Time	Rank	Time	Rank
Tim Brys	Men's single sculls	6:52.35	3 QF	Bye		6:46.26	2 SA/B	6:45.32	3 FA	6:48.44	4
Niels Van Zandweghe; Tibo Vyvey	Men's lightweight double sculls	6:42.99	3 R	6:45.07	1 SA/B	—N/a		6:30.49	5 FB	6:20.28	9

Qualification Legend: FA=Final A (medal); FB=Final B (non-medal); FC=Final C (non-medal); FD=Final D (non-medal); FE=Final E (non-medal); FF=Final F (non-medal); SA/B=Semifinals A/B; SC/D=Semifinals C/D; SE/F=Semifinals E/F; QF=Quarterfinals; R=Repechage

== Sailing ==
Belgian sailors qualified one boat in the Men's Dinghy, the Women's Dinghy and the 49erFX classes through the 2023 Sailing World Championships in The Hague, Netherlands. Belgian sailors qualified one boat each in the Men's 49er and the mixed Nacra 17 classes through the French Olympic Week Last Chance Regatta in Hyères, France.

Medal race events

Athlete	Event	Race													Net points	Final rank
Athlete	Event	1	2	3	4	5	6	7	8	9	10	11	12	M*	Net points	Final rank
William de Smet	Men's ILCA 7	20	7	34	4	13	35	~~44~~	18	C		—N/a		EL	131	22
Yannick Lefèbvre; Jan Heuninck	Men's 49er	~~20~~	19	5	15	15	7	14	17	19	4	3	9	EL	127	16
Emma Plasschaert	Women's ILCA 6	~~25~~	10	11	6	9	16	8	7	15	C	—N/a		16	99	7
Isaura Maenhaut; Anouk Geurts	Women's 49erFX	17	18	11	5	7	4	4	18	6	7	~~20~~	19	EL	115	14
Lucas Claeyssens; Eline Verstraelen	Mixed Nacra 17	15	15	16	18	19	18	~~20~~	16	18	15	19	17	EL	186	19

M = Medal race; EL = Eliminated – did not advance into the medal race; C = Race cancelled

== Sport climbing ==
Belgium qualified one climber for the olympic games. Hannes Van Duysen qualified for the Boulder & lead combined by finishing in the top 10 of the 2024 Olympic Qualifier Series.

Boulder & lead combined

Athlete	Event	Qualification							Final						
Athlete	Event	Boulder		Lead			Total	Rank	Boulder		Lead			Total	Rank
Athlete	Event	Result	Place	Hold	Score	Place	Total	Rank	Result	Place	Hold	Score	Place	Total	Rank
Hannes Van Duysen	Men's	34.3	7		12.0	17	46.3	14	Did not advance						

== Swimming ==
Belgian swimmers achieved the entry standards in the following events for Paris 2024 (a maximum of two swimmers under the Olympic Qualifying Time (OQT) and potentially at the Olympic Consideration Time (OCT)):

Athlete	Event	Heat		Semifinal		Final	
Athlete	Event	Time	Rank	Time	Rank	Time	Rank
Lucas Henveaux	Men's 200 m freestyle	1:46.04 NR	3 Q	1:46.20	11	Did not advance	
Lucas Henveaux	Men's 400 m freestyle	3:46.76	12	—N/a		Did not advance	
Lucas Henveaux	Men's 800 m freestyle	7:51.51 NR	19	—N/a		Did not advance	
Valentine Dumont	Women's 200 m freestyle	1:57.50	12 Q	1:57.50	13	Did not advance	
Valentine Dumont	Women's 400 m freestyle	4:08.25	12	—N/a		Did not advance	
Florine Gaspard	Women's 50 m freestyle	24.69	14 Q	24.82	15	Did not advance	
Roos Vanotterdijk	Women's 100 m backstroke	59.68	9 Q	59.86	10	Did not advance	
Roos Vanotterdijk	Women's 100 m butterfly	57.54	10 Q	57.25 NR	10	Did not advance	

== Table tennis ==
For the first time since 2012, Belgium entered two table tennis players into Paris 2024. Martin Allegro and Cedric Nuytinck secured a spot through the International Table Tennis Federation World Singles Ranking list of June 18, 2024, both in the men's single classes.

Athlete	Event	Preliminary	Round of 64	Round of 32	Round of 16	Quarterfinals	Semifinals	Final / BM	
Athlete	Event	Opposition Result	Opposition Result	Opposition Result	Opposition Result	Opposition Result	Opposition Result	Opposition Result	Rank
Martin Allegro	Men's singles	Bye	Harimoto (JPN); L 0–4	Did not advance					=33
Cedric Nuytinck	Men's singles	Bye	Möregårdh (SWE); L 0–4	Did not advance					=33

== Taekwondo ==
Belgium qualified one athlete to compete at the games. Sarah Chaâri qualified for Paris 2024 by virtue of finishing within the top five in the Olympic rankings in her division.

Athlete	Event	Qualification	Round of 16	Quarterfinals	Semifinals	Repechage	Final / BM	
Athlete	Event	Opposition Result	Opposition Result	Opposition Result	Opposition Result	Opposition Result	Opposition Result	Rank
Sarah Chaâri	Women's −67 kg	—N/a	Rodríguez (DOM); W 2–0	Shehata (EGY); W 2–0	Márton (HUN); L 0–2	—N/a	Sobirjonova (UZB); W 2–1	3rd place, bronze medalist(s)

== Tennis ==
Belgium entered three tennis players into the Olympic tournament.

Athlete	Event	Round of 64	Round of 32	Round of 16	Quarterfinals	Semifinals	Final / BM	
Athlete	Event	Opposition Score	Opposition Score	Opposition Score	Opposition Score	Opposition Score	Opposition Score	Rank
Zizou Bergs	Men's singles	S. Tsitsipas (GRE); L 6–7^{(6–8)}, 6–1, 1–6	Did not advance					
Sander Gillé; Joran Vliegen	Men's doubles	—N/a	Fils / Humbert (FRA); W 7–5, 6–4	Evans / Murray (GBR); L 3–6, 7–6^{(10–8)}, [9–11]	Did not advance			

== Triathlon ==
Belgium qualified four triathletes (2 men and 2 women) for the following events at the Games, by gaining the necessary slots in the World Triathlon Individual Olympic Qualification Ranking.

Individual

Athlete	Event	Time						Rank
Athlete	Event	Swim (1.5 km)	Trans 1	Bike (40 km)	Trans 2	Run (10 km)	Total	Rank
Jelle Geens	Men's	23:13	0:53	54:16	0:26	31:47	1:50:35	42
Marten Van Riel	Men's	20:34	0:56	51:53	0:26	32:22	1:46:11	22
Claire Michel	Women's	26:05	0:56	59:16	0:28	35:37	2:02:22	38
Jolien Vermeylen	Women's	22:42	0:54	59:16	0:29	36:23	1:59:44	24

Relay

Athlete	Event	Time						Rank
Athlete	Event	Swim (300 m)	Trans 1	Bike (7 km)	Trans 2	Run (2 km)	Total group	Rank
Marten Van Riel	Mixed relay	Did not start						—N/a
Jolien Vermeylen	Mixed relay	Did not start						—N/a
Jelle Geens	Mixed relay	Did not start						—N/a
Claire Michel	Mixed relay	Did not start						—N/a
Total	Mixed relay	—N/a						

== Weightlifting ==
Belgium entered one weightlifter into the Olympic competition. Nina Sterckx secured one of the top ten slots in both the (women's 49 kg) and (women's 59 kg) weight divisions based on the IWF Olympic Qualification Rankings and chose to compete in the former.

Athlete	Event	Snatch		Clean & Jerk		Total	Rank
Athlete	Event	Result	Rank	Result	Rank	Total	Rank
Nina Sterckx	Women's −49 kg	DNF				---	12

== See also ==
- Belgium at the 2024 Winter Youth Olympics
