= KBWB =

KBWB may refer to:

- KOFY-TV, a television station (virtual channel 20 / UHF digital channel 21) licensed to San Francisco, California, United States, which held the call sign KBWB from September 1998 to October 2008
- Royal Belgian Cycling League (Koninklijke Belgische Wielrijdersbond)
