= Cycle racing in Belgium =

Cycle racing is a popular sport in Belgium. It is governed by the Royal Belgian Cycling League since 1882, which became a founding member of the International Cycling Association in 1892 and later of the Union Cycliste Internationale in 1900. Since 2002, the Royal Belgian Cycling League is composed of the Wielerbond Vlaanderen (WBV), which governs the cycle racing in Flanders and of the Fédération Cycliste Wallonie-Bruxelles (FCWB), which governs the cycle racing in Wallonia and Brussels. Belgium has been one of the major countries in different categories of cycle racing over the years, including road cycling and cyclo-cross. The best Belgian cyclist of all times, Eddy Merckx, nicknamed the Cannibal, has won all of the three grand tours (five Tour de France and Giro d'Italia wins as well as one Vuelta a España win) and all of the five monuments of cycling. He also won the UCI Road World Championships three times and set the hour record, among other achievements.

== Road bicycle racing ==
=== Palmares ===
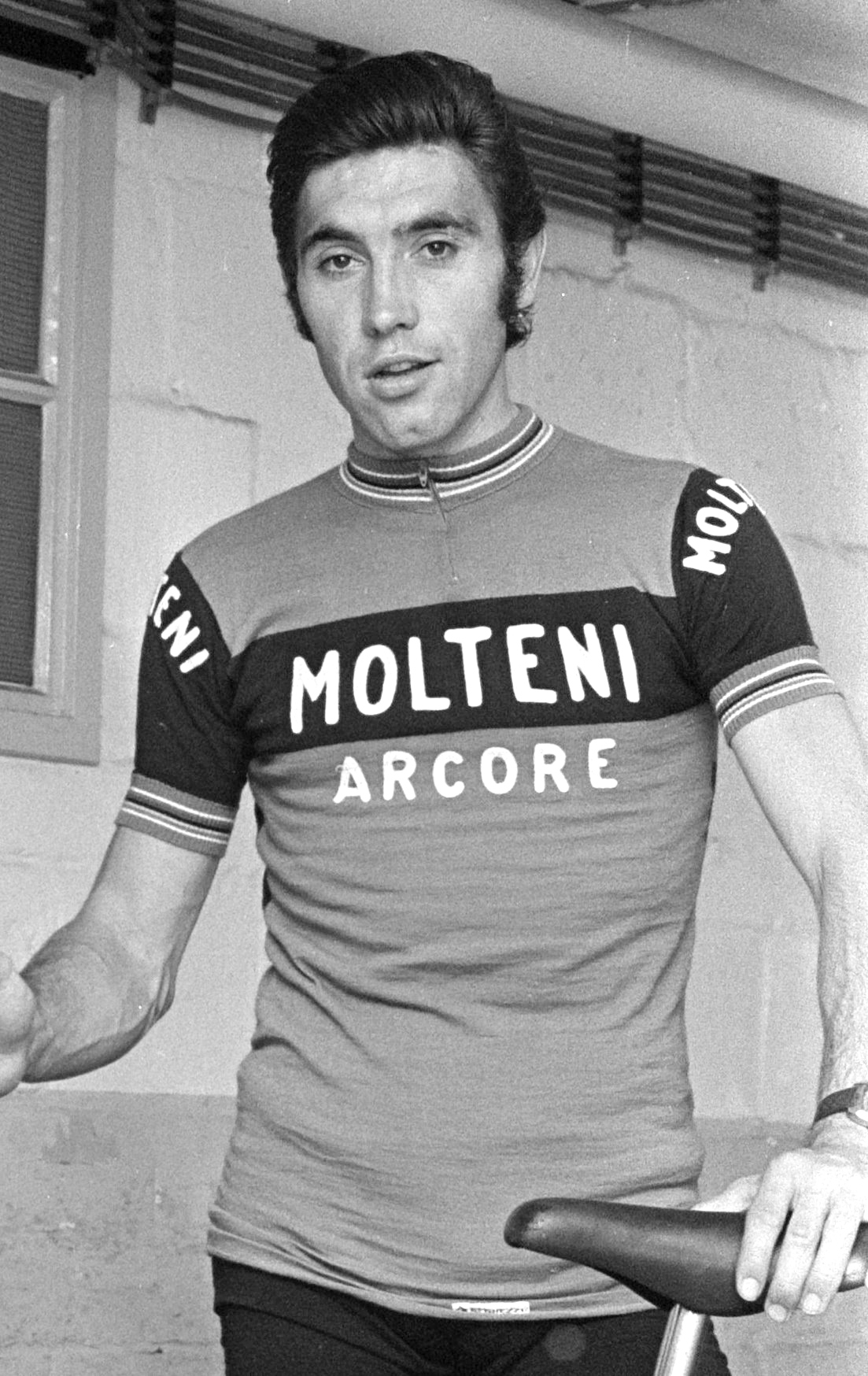
Eddy Merckx in 1973

At the Olympic Games, Belgium has won four gold medals for road cycling, with two victories for the men's team time trial (at the 1948 and 1952 Summer Olympics) and two in the individual race, for André Noyelle in 1952 and Greg Van Avermaet in 2016. The time trial team had previously won the silver medal at the 1924 Summer Olympics and the bronze at the 1936 Summer Olympics. Belgium has also collected the silver medal for the individual race competition in 1924 (Henri Hoevenaers), in 1952 (Robert Grondelaers) and in 2020 (Wout Van Aert) and the bronze in 1948 (Lode Wouters), 1960 (Willy van den Berghen), 1964 (Walter Godefroot) and 2004 (Axel Merckx).

Belgian cyclists have had more UCI Road World Championship gold medals (25) at the men's road race than any other country. Rik Van Steenbergen and Eddy Merckx have both won the title three times, and Georges Ronsse, Briek Schotte, Rik Van Looy and Freddy Maertens have all won twice. Women have won six gold medals at the women's road race event, with four for Yvonne Reynders. Other famous riders who won the title include Stan Ockers, Johan Museeuw, Tom Boonen and the current world champion Remco Evenepoel.

The first season-long competition in road cycling, the Challenge Desgrange-Colombo was introduced in 1948, and first won by Belgian rider Briek Schotte. Later in 1955, Stan Ockers became the second Belgian to win the competition. From 1956 to 1958, Fred de Bruyne won the trophy three times, and so equalled the record of Ferdinand Kübler. The next year, the challenge was replaced by the Super Prestige Pernod International. Starting in 1968, this competition was won by Belgians ten times in a row, first by Herman Van Springel, then seven consecutive times by Eddy Merckx and in 1976 and 1977 by Freddy Maertens. In 1989, the UCI Road World Cup started and was won twice by Johan Museeuw (1995 and 1996) and once by Andreï Tchmil (1999). Since the competition was replaced by the UCI ProTour in 2005 and then by the UCI World Tour in 2009, Tom Boonen has reached the highest ranking with a second place in 2005 and Philippe Gilbert has been ranked third in 2010.

Belgian cyclists have also performed very well in the three big tours. Ten cyclists have won the Tour de France, making of Belgium the second country with the most Tour de France wins (18) behind France. Besides Eddy Merckx (five wins), Philippe Thys won the most prestigious tour three times (1913, 1914 and 1920) while Firmin Lambot (1919 and 1922) and Sylvère Maes (1936 and 1939) both won twice. The latest Belgian winner at the Tour de France however was Lucien Van Impe in 1976. Belgian cyclists have been more successful at winning the maillot vert for best sprinter, with 19 wins. Eddy Merckx and Freddy Maertens (three wins) and Stan Ockers (two wins) are the multiple winners in this classification. Wout Van Aert won the shirt recently in 2022. The maillot à pois for best climber was won six times by Lucien Van Impe, the last time in 1983, equalling the record of Federico Bahamontes, and twice by Félicien Vervaecke and Eddy Merckx. In 2004 however, the record of six maillot à pois wins was beaten by Richard Virenque. At the Giro d'Italia, Belgium has had seven wins, being the second country most successful country after Italy (66 wins). Michel Pollentier and Johan De Muynck (the latest Belgian to have won the Giro in 1978) are with Eddy Merckx (five wins) the three Belgian winners of this tour. Other achievements in this tour include six maglia verde of best climber (including two for Lucien Van Impe) and five maglia ciclamino for best sprinter (three for Roger De Vlaeminck and two for Eddy Merckx). Belgium also has had eight wins at the Vuelta a España, with two wins by Gustaaf Deloor, the first winner of this tour in 1935 and 1936. The latest Belgian winner was Remco Evenepoel in 2022. In the other classifications, Belgian cyclists have won 13 times the points classification, including Greg Van Avermaet in 2008 but never the mountains classification.

Many Belgian cyclists have won one of the five monument cycle races. At the Tour of Flanders, Belgium counts 67 wins in 95 editions with three wins for Achiel Buysse, Eric Leman and Johan Museeuw. Roger De Vlaeminck holds the record of wins at Paris–Roubaix (four), and Belgium is the most successful country in this race with 54 wins in 109 editions. Liège–Bastogne–Liège was won 59 times on 97 by Belgian cyclists. Eddy Merckx holds the record of the most individual wins (five). At the Giro di Lombardia, Belgium counts 12 titles in 104 editions, with only Italy performing better. Milan – San Remo was won seven times by Eddy Merckx, who holds the record of the most wins, and Belgium has won 20 times on 102, being the second most successful country after Italy in this race. In contrast to the big tours, where Belgians did not win between 1978 and 2022, cyclists from Belgium have been more successful in the monument races. At Paris–Roubaix, Johan Museeuw and Tom Boonen have won three times each since 1996, and Peter Van Petegem and Johan Van Summeren have also won the race once each. At the Tour of Flanders, Belgium has 11 wins since 1993, with three by Johan Museeuw, two by Peter Van Petegem, Tom Boonen and Stijn Devolder and one by Andreï Tchmil and Nick Nuyens. In the other three monuments, Belgians has been less successful recently, with Andreï Tchmil being the only Belgian winner of Milan – San Remo in 1999 since Fons De Wolf in 1981. Philippe Gilbert has been the only winner of the Giro di Lombardia since Fons De Wolf in 1980, with wins in 2009 and 2010 and only five Belgians have won Liège–Bastogne–Liège since Joseph Bruyère in 1978: Eric Van Lancker in 1990, Dirk De Wolf in 1992, Frank Vandenbroucke in 1999, Philippe Gilbert in 2011 and Remco Evenepoel in 2022

=== Famous races ===
Among the best-known road races, two out of the five monuments of cycling are held in Belgium: the Tour of Flanders and Liège–Bastogne–Liège. The Tour of Flanders is the final race of the Flemish Cycling Week, held in late March and early April, along with the Classic Bruges–De Panne, E3 Saxo Bank Classic, Gent–Wevelgem, Dwars door Vlaanderen. Meanwhile, the Liège–Bastogne–Liège and La Flèche Wallonne are part of the Ardennes classics, held in mid-April. The Omloop Het Nieuwsblad is the eighth Belgian classic race in the UCI World Tour. Other classic one day races in Belgium are Brussels Cycling Classic, Kuurne–Brussels–Kuurne, Grand Prix de Wallonie. The best-known stage-races in Belgium are the Tour of Benelux, part of the UCI World Tour, and the Tour of Belgium, part of the UCI Europe Tour.

The Belgian National Road Race Championships, Belgian National Time Trial Championships and Belgian National Cyclo-cross Championships determine which rider carries the Belgian flag for 12 months.

=== Professional teams ===
Belgium has currently two professional cycling teams performing in the UCI World Tour: Soudal-Quick-Step and Intermarché-Circus-Gobert.

== Other categories ==
In mountain bike, Filip Meirhaeghe has won the 2002 UCI Mountain Bike World Cup and the 2003 UCI Mountain Bike & Trials World Championships and was silver-medalist at the 2000 Summer Olympics. In mountain bike trials, Kenny Belaey has won the 26-inch wheel trial World Cup in 2002, 2005 and 2006.

In cyclo-cross, Belgian competitors have gained 25 gold medals at the UCI Cyclo-cross Men World Championships since 1950 and 54 medals overall, making it the best country in cyclo-cross, ahead of France with 10 gold medals out of 34 medals. Eric De Vlaeminck has the most world title in cyclo-cross with 7 World Cup wins between 1966 and 1973. Other multiple Belgian world champions are Roland Liboton (4 titles), Mario De Clercq and Erwin Vervecken (3) and Bart Wellens (2).

In track cycling, Matthew Gilmore and Etienne De Wilde won the gold medal of Men's Madison event at the 1998 UCI Track Cycling World Championships and the silver medal of Men's Madison at the 2000 Summer Olympics. Roger Ilegems won the gold medal of the Men's point race at the 1984 Summer Olympics while Patrick Sercu held several world records and won the gold medal of the Men's 1 km time trial at the 1964 Summer Olympics.
