= Lisa Berkani =

French basketball player (born 1997)

No. 10 – USO Mondeville
- Position: Point guard / shooting guard
- League: Ligue Féminine de Basketball

Personal information
- Born: May 19, 1997 (age 29) Beaumont, Puy-de-Dôme, France
- Listed height: 5 ft 9 in (1.75 m)

Career information
- WNBA draft: 2017: 2nd round, 24th overall pick
- Drafted by: Minnesota Lynx
- Playing career: 2014–present

Career history
- 2014–2015: Bourges
- 2015–2016: Montpellier
- 2016–present: USO Mondeville

Career highlights
- 2× LFB champion (2015, 2016)
- Stats at Basketball Reference
Medals
Women's basketball
Representing France
FIBA Europe U18 Championship
Gold medal – first place	2015 Slovenia	National team

Lisa Berkani (born May 19, 1997) is a French professional basketball player for ESB Villeneuve-d'Ascq of the Ligue Féminine de Basketball (LFB). She was drafted by the Minnesota Lynx with the 24th overall pick in the 2017 WNBA draft.

She competes internationally for the France women's national basketball team.

== Early life ==
Berkani was born in Beaumont, Puy-de-Dôme located in Central France. She has competed for France in international play since she was 14, playing in numerous international tournaments all around the world.

== Professional career ==
Berkani began her professional career in 2014 when she signed with CJM Bourges Basket at the age of 17. In her first season as a professional Berkani averaged 1.3 points per game in 3 minutes played. In 2015 Berkani signed with Basket Lattes where she still didn't see much playing time. After the season for the club in which she averaged just under five points per game she left the club.

On January 7, 2016, Berkani Signed with USO Mondeville where she saw significant playing time. In 22 games played Berkani averaged 12.3 points, 5.1 assists and 2.0 rebounds per game during the 2016–17 season.

On April 13, 2017, Berkani was drafted in the 2nd round 24th overall in the 2017 WNBA draft by the Minnesota Lynx she was the only French women select in that years draft and the first since Diandra Tchatchouang in 2013. She continued playing for Mondeville.

== National team career ==
Berkani has represented France internationally ever since she was 14. She has competed in the 2015 and 2016 FIBA Europe Under-18 Championship for Women. She has also competed in the Jeux de la Francophonie and FIBA 3x3 World Cup winning both.

In 2018 it was announced that Berkani had made the roster for the France women's national basketball team. In February 2018 Berkani made her national team debut against Slovenia, she scored 4 points in a French loss.
