= List of Belgian records in track cycling =

The following are the national records in track cycling in Belgium maintained by Royal Belgian Cycling League.

== Men ==
Key to tables: Awaiting ratification Record not kept by Royal Belgian Cycling League Not ratified or later rescinded by the Royal Belgian Cycling League

Event	Record	Athlete	Date	Meet	Place	Ref
Flying 200m time trial	9.529	Lowie Nulens	3 February 2026	European Championships	Konya, Turkey	
250m time trial (standing start)	17.929	Runar De Schrijver	16 July 2025	European U23 Championships	Anadia, Portugal	
1km time trial	1:00.871	Ayrton De Pauw	12 November 2017	World Cup	Manchester, United Kingdom	
1km time trial (sea level)	1:00.871	Ayrton De Pauw	12 November 2017	World Cup	Manchester, United Kingdom	
Team sprint	43.261	Runar De Schrijver; Lowie Nulens; Yeno Vingerhoets	1 February 2026	European Championships	Konya, Turkey	
4000m individual pursuit	4:04.470	Noah Vandenbranden	18 October 2024	World Championships	Ballerup, Denmark	
4000m team pursuit	3:45.685	Lindsay De Vylder; Fabio Van den Bossche; Tuur Dens; Noah Vandenbranden	6 August 2024	Olympic Games	Saint-Quentin-en-Yvelines, France	
Hour record	55.089 km	Victor Campenaerts	16 April 2019		Aguascalientes, Mexico	

== Women ==
Event	Record	Athlete	Date	Meet	Place	Ref
Flying 200m time trial	10.652	Zita Gheysens	2 February 2026	European Championship	Konya, Turkey	
250 m time trial (standing start)	19.599	Elke Vanhoof	14 October 2026	World Championships	Shanghai, China	
500m time trial	34.335	Julie Nicolaes	15 July 2023	European U23 Championships	Anadia, Portugal	
1 km time trial	1:06.906	Zita Gheysens	4 February 2026	European Championship	Konya, Turkey	
Team sprint (500 m)	34.556	Nicky Degrendele; Valerie Jenaer	27 January 2023		Ghent, Belgium	
Team sprint (750 m)	48.376	Elke Vanhoof; Nicky Degrendele; Zita Gheysens	14 October 2026	World Championships	Shanghai, China	
3000m individual pursuit	3:27.932	Lotte Kopecky	2 January 2023		Ghent, Belgium	
4000m individual pursuit	4:29.426	Lotte Kopecky	24 January 2026	Belgian Championships	Heusden-Zolder, Belgium	
3000m team pursuit	3:27.508	Jessie Daams; Jolien D'hoore; Kelly Druyts	16 December 2010	World Cup	Cali, Colombia	
4000m team pursuit	4:12.150	Shari Bossuyt; Katrijn De Clercq; Luca Vierstraete; Hélène Hesters	2 February 2026	European Championships	Konya, Turkey	
