= Elise Ramette =

Belgian basketball player

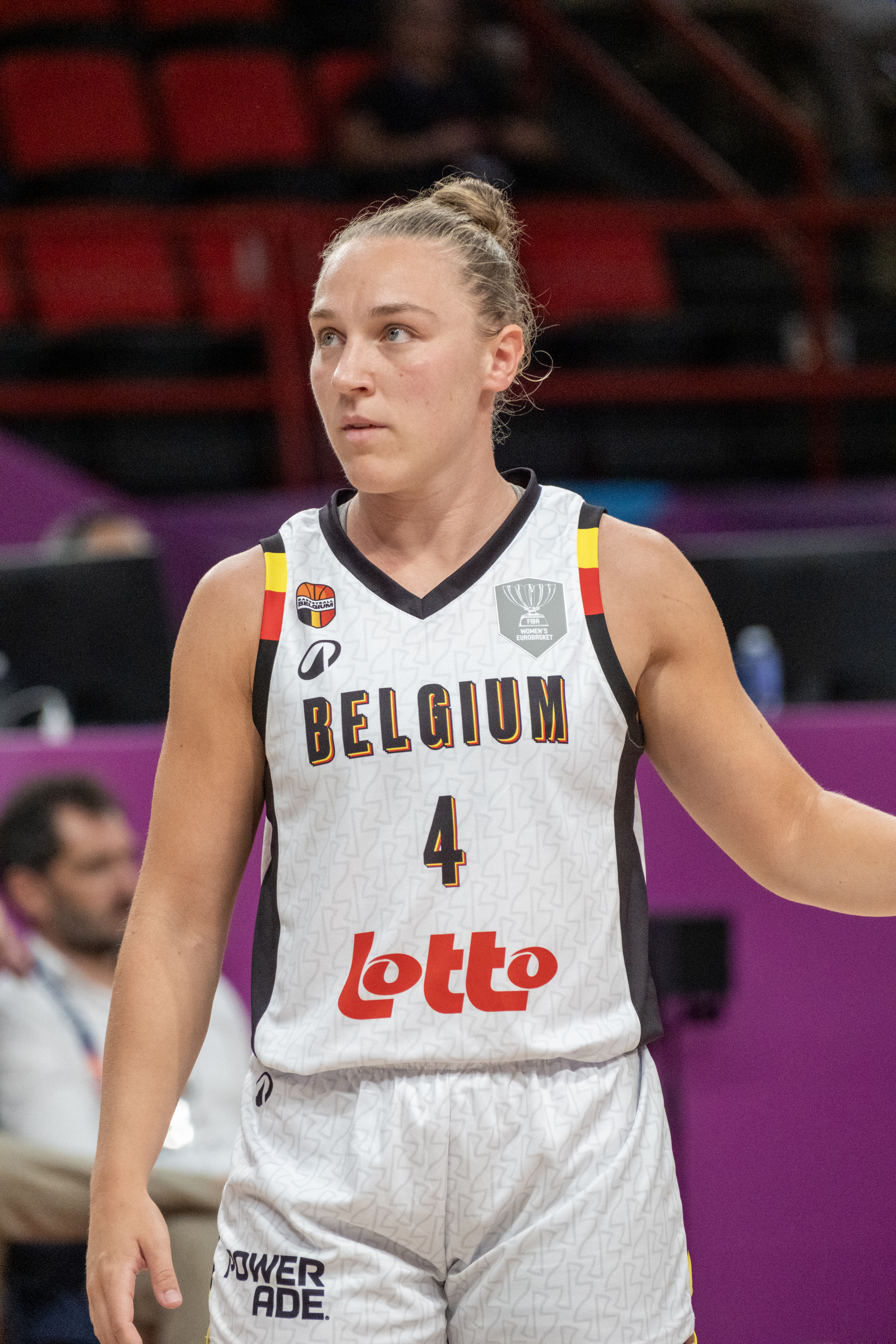
- Ramette with Belgium during 2025 EuroBasket

Personal information
- Born: 3 November 1998 (age 28)
- Listed height: 1.71 m (5 ft 7 in)

Career information
- High school: College Ieper

Career history
- 2017–20: BC Sint-Katelijne-Waver
- 2020–22: Castors Braine
- 2022–24: Cadí la Seu
- 2024–: Joventut Badalona

Career highlights
- FIBA EuroBasket champion (2023, 2025); Spanish league champion (2022–23, 2023–24)

Elise Ramette (born 3 November 1998) is a Belgian basketball player. She represented Belgium at the 2024 Summer Olympics. Ramette was also part of the Belgian squad that won the EuroBasket Women 2023 and EuroBasket Women 2025 championship.

Ramette was also a member of the Belgium women's national 3x3 team during the 2022 FIBA 3x3 World Cup in Antwerp.

== Personal life ==
At EuroBasket 2023, Ramette defended her master's thesis in physiotherapy via video conference to her Ghent supervisor on 24 June 2023 between 6 and 7 a.m., in order to win the semi-final against France later that day at the Arena Stožice in Ljubljana.

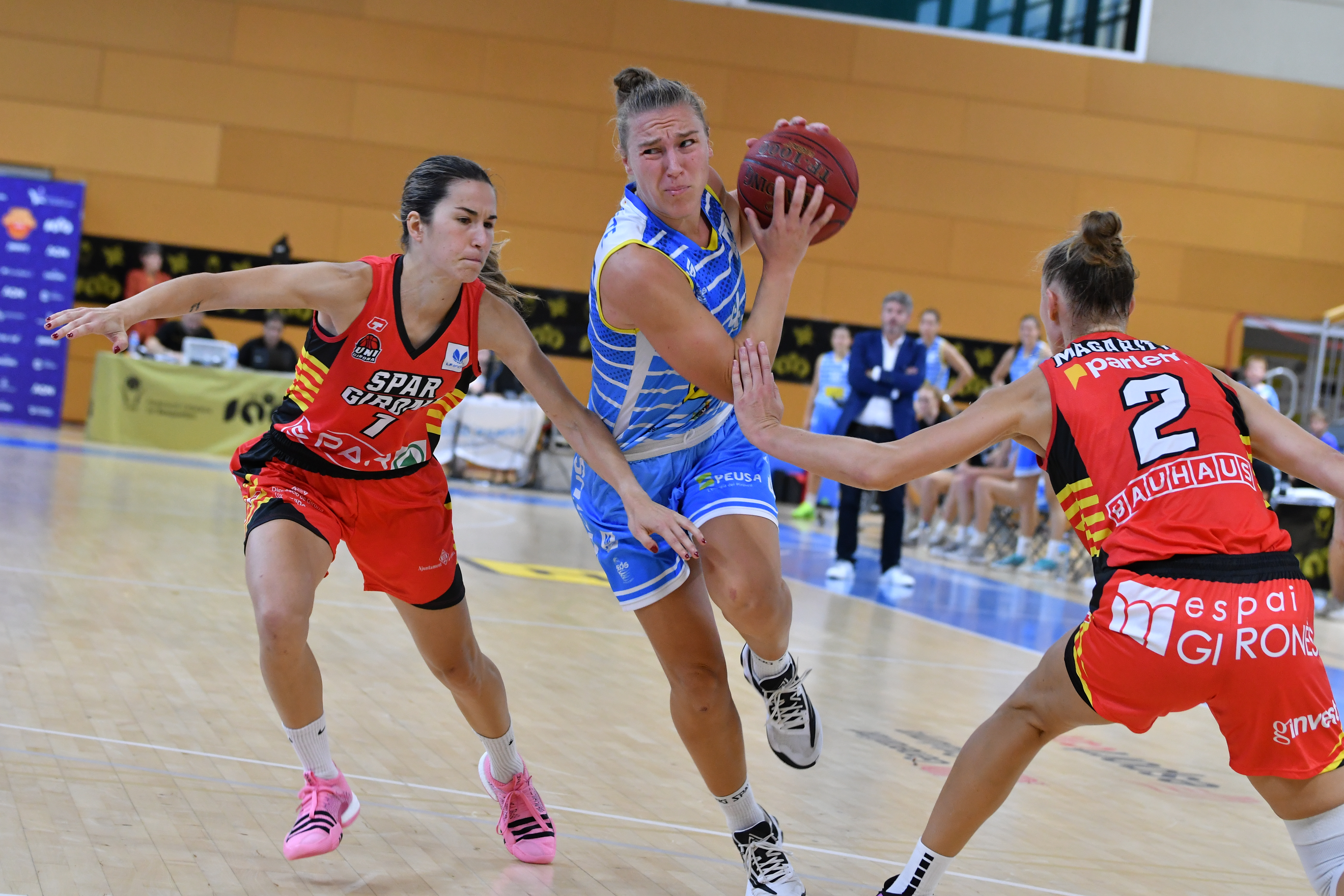
Ramette during the 35th Lliga Catalana final in 2023

== Honours ==
=== Club ===
(Spain) Cardi la Seu

- Liga Femenina de Baloncesto: 2022–23, 2023–24
- Lliga catalana: 2022–23, 2023–24

=== National team ===
- EuroBasket Women: (gold) 2023, 2025
- Belgian Sports team of the Year: 2020, 2023, 2025
