= Alix Duchet =

French basketball player

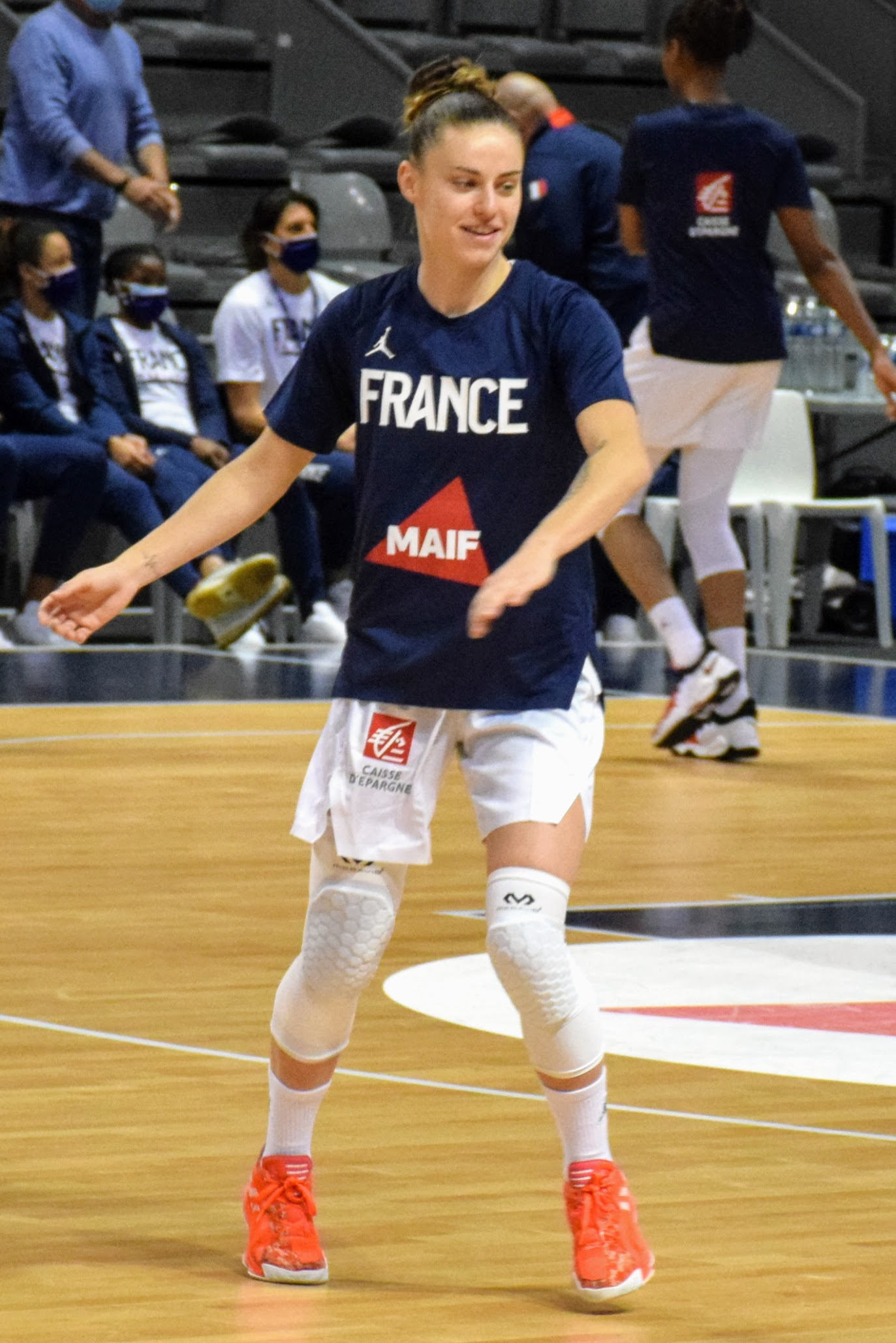
- Duchet in 2021

No. 39 – Tango Bourges Basket
- Position: Point guard
- League: La Boulangère Wonderligue

Personal information
- Born: 30 December 1997 (age 28) Roanne, France
- Listed height: 5 ft 6 in (1.68 m)
- Listed weight: 121 lb (55 kg)

Career information
- Playing career: 2015–present

Career history
- 2015–2016: Arras
- 2016–2018: Nice
- 2018–2020: Lattes Montpellier
- 2020–present: Bourges

Alix Duchet (born 30 December 1997) is a French basketball player for Tango Bourges Basket and the French national team.

== Career ==
She participated at the 2018 FIBA Women's Basketball World Cup and EuroBasket Women 2021.
