= Royal Belgian Cycling League =

National governing body of cycle racing in Belgium

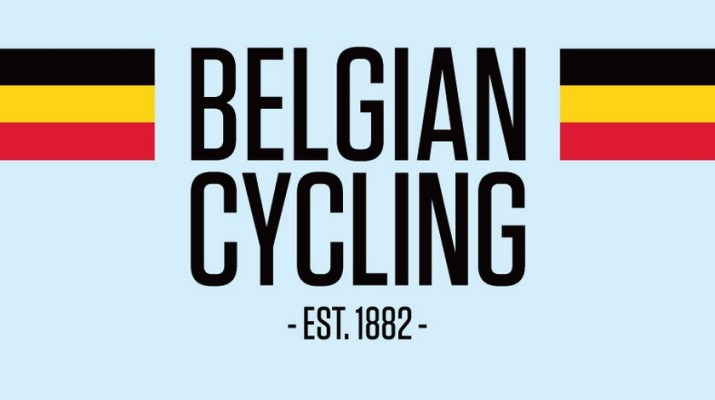
- Sport: Bicycle racing
- Jurisdiction: National
- Abbreviation: KBWB-RLVB
- Founded: 11 November 1882
- Affiliation: UCI
- Headquarters: Tubize, Belgium

Official website
- www.belgiancycling.be
- (Belgium)

The Royal Belgian Cycling League or KBWB/RLVB (in Dutch: Koninklijke Belgische Wielrijdersbond, in French: Royale Ligue vélocipédique belge) is the national governing body of cycle racing in Belgium. It was founded on 11 November 1882.

The KBWB-RLVB is a member of the UCI and the UEC.

In 2019, the headquarters moved from Brussels to Tubize.

Former logo

== Events organized by the KBWB/RLVB ==
- Belgian Cycling Championships
  - Belgian National Road Race Championships
  - Belgian National Time Trial Championships
  - Belgian National Track Championships
  - Belgian National Cyclo-cross Championships
- UCI Road World Championships for professionals in 1930, 1935, 1950, 1957, 1963, 1975, 1988, 2002 and 2021.
- UCI Track World Championships for professionals in 1894, 1905, 1910, 1920, 1930, 1935, 1950, 1957, 1963, 1969, 1975, 1988, and 2001.

== See also ==
- Cycle racing in Belgium
- Belgian records in track cycling
- Belgian Road Cycling Cup
- Ardennes classics
- Flanders Classics
