= Alexia Chartereau =

French basketball player (born 1998)

Alexia Chery (formerly Chartereau)
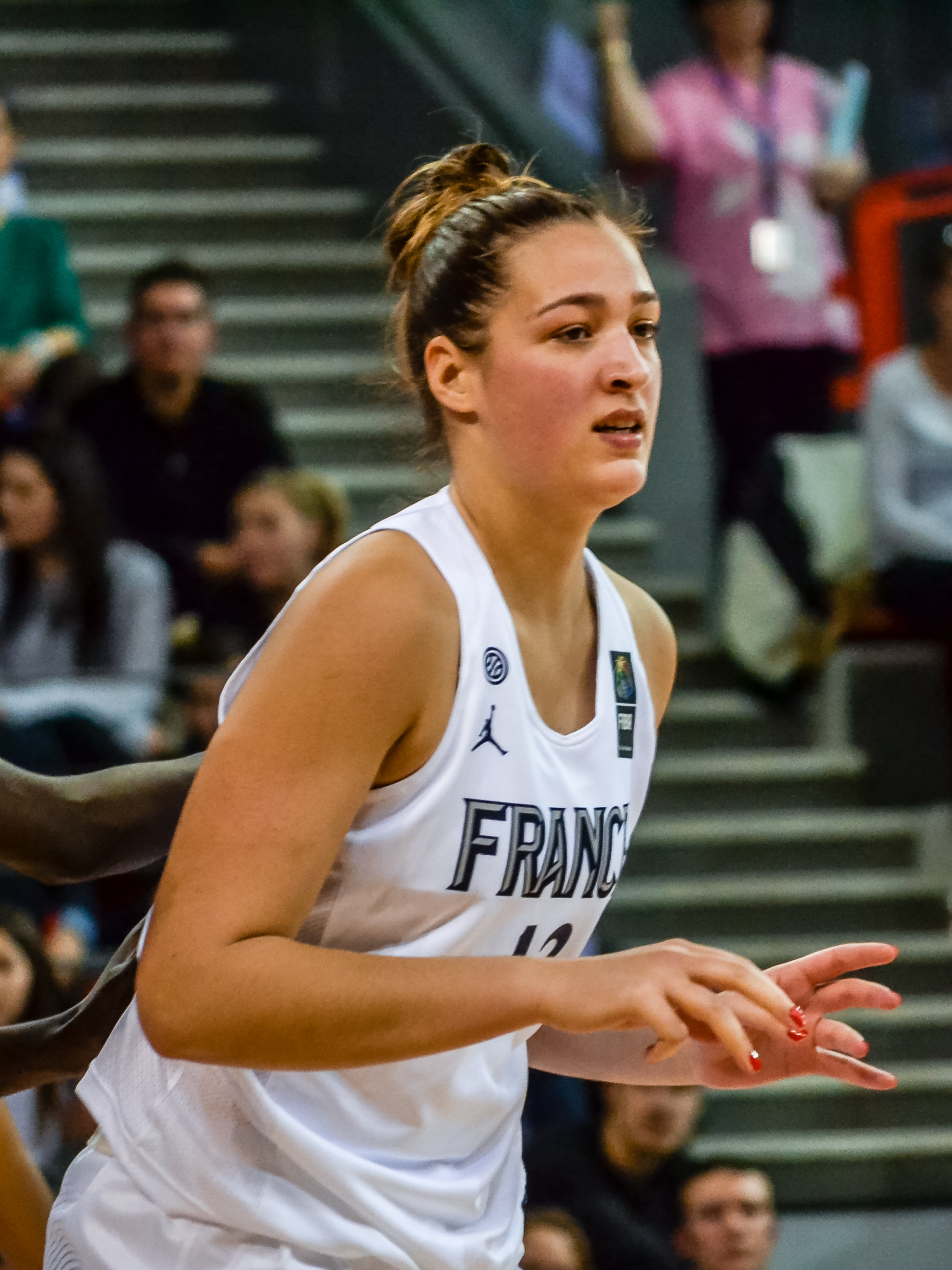
- Chartereau in 2019

No. 11 – CJM Bourges Basket
- Position: Power forward
- League: LFB

Personal information
- Born: 5 September 1998 (age 28) Le Mans, France
- Listed height: 6 ft 3 in (1.91 m)
- Listed weight: 174 lb (79 kg)

Alexia Chery (born 5 September 1998), formerly known as Alexia Chartereau, is a French basketball player for CJM Bourges Basket and the French national team.

== Career ==
With the French women's national basketball team, she won a silver medal at the 2024 Summer Olympics and a bronze medal at the 2020 Summer Olympics. She also earned medals at EuroBasket Women in 2017, 2019, 2021, and 2023.

== Personal life ==
In the summer of 2023, she married French basketball player Valentin Chery.
