= Flore de Winne =

Belgian dressage rider (born 1995)

Personal information
- Full name: Flore de Winne
- Nationality: Belgian
- Born: 5 April 1995 (age 31) Zottegem, Belgium

Sport
- Country: Belgium
- Sport: Dressage
- Club: WinHorses

Achievements and titles
- Olympic finals: 2024 Summer Olympics

Flore De Winne (born 5 April 1995) is a Belgian Olympic dressage rider. She competed at the 2024 Summer Olympic Games in Paris, representing Belgium.

== Equestrian career ==
Flore De Winne's international break-through came in 2023 at the 2023 FEI European Dressage Championships in Riesenbeck, Germany where she helped the Belgian Dressage Team to qualify for the 2024 Summer Olympic Games in Paris, France. In December 2023, she posted the first ever 80 (percent) in the history of Dressage in Belgium at the CDI-W Mechelen. At the beginning of the 2024, she was sixth at the World Cup Final in Riyadh/KSA and later that year won the victory at the Belgian Championships. In November 2024 her career maker and the highest scoring Belgian Olympic team horse at the 2024 Games in Paris, the stallion Flyn FRH, the horse on which all aforementioned results were obtained, was sold to Switzerland.

== Personal life ==
Flore de Winne runs her own training and sales business WinHorses in Zottegem, Belgium. WinHorses specializes in buying and selling the best dressage horses.

== Dressage results ==
=== Olympic Games ===
Event	Team	Individual	Freestyle	Horse
(France) Paris 2024	5th	19th	—	Flynn FRH

=== European Championships ===
Event	Team	Individual	Freestyle	Horse
(Germany) 2023 Riesenbeck	8th	37th	-	Flynn FRH

=== World Cup Final ===
Event	Score	Rank	Horse
(Saudi Arabia) 2024 Riyadh	76.139%	6th	Flynn FRH
