= Individual dressage at the 2026 FEI World Championships =

The individual dressage at the 2026 FEI World Championships in Aachen, Germany was held from 10 to 15 August 2026.

== Competition format ==
The team and individual dressage competitions used the same results. Dressage had three phases. The first phase was the Grand Prix. Top 30 individuals advanced to the second phase, the Grand Prix Special where the first individual medals were awarded. The last set of medals at the 2026 World Dressage Championships was awarded after the third phase, the Grand Prix Freestyle where top 18 combinations competed.

== Results ==
| Rider | Nation | Horse | GP score | Rank | GPS score | Rank | GPF score | Rank |
|---|---|---|---|---|---|---|---|---|
| Cathrine Laudrup-Dufour | Denmark | Mount St.John Freestyle | 82.376 | 1 Q | 80.927 | 2nd place, silver medalist(s) | 91.236 | 2nd place, silver medalist(s) |
| Justin Verboomen | Belgium | Zonik Plus | 80.885 | 2 Q | 79.362 | 5 Q | 88.439 | 4 |
| Charlotte Fry | Great Britain | Glamourdale | 80.311 | 3 Q | 82.295 | 1st place, gold medalist(s) | 91.907 | 1st place, gold medalist(s) |
| Isabell Werth | Germany | Wendy de Fontaine | 79.876 | 4 Q | 79.544 | 4 Q | 88.650 | 3rd place, bronze medalist(s) |
| Katharina Hemmer | Germany | Denoix PCH | 79.224 | 5 Q | 80.866 | 3rd place, bronze medalist(s) | | |
| Marieke van der Putten | Netherlands | Zantana RS2 OLD | 77.764 | 6 Q | 76.246 | 8 Q | 82.693 | 6 |
| Carl Hester | Great Britain | Fame | 77.314 | 7 Q | 78.298 | 6 Q | 82.304 | 7 |
| Isabel Freese | Norway | Total Hope OLD | 76.227 | 8 Q | 74.347 | 13 Q | 78.021 | 13 |
| Frederic Wandres | Germany | Bluetooth OLD | 75.963 | 9 Q | 74.240 | 14 | 76.246 | 15 |
| Daniel Bachmann Andersen | Denmark | Flash Gordon 37 | 74.876 | 10 Q | 74.666 | 11 Q | 80.107 | 10 |
| Dinja van Liere | Netherlands | Mauro Turfhorst | 74.161 | 10 Q | 72.857 | 18 Q | 79.000 | 12 |
| Becky Moody | Great Britain | Jagerbomb | 73.820 | 12 Q | 77.660 | 7 Q | 87.479 | 5 |
| Raphael Netz | Germany | Great Escape Camelot | 73.338 | 13 Q | 75.091 | 10 Q | 80.946 | 8 |
| Sandra Sysojeva | Poland | Maxima Bella | 73.152 | 14 Q | 73.875 | 15 Q | 80.175 | 9 |
| Larissa Pauluis | Belgium | Flambeau | 72.469 | 15 Q | 72.325 | 20 Q | 76.432 | 14 |
| Simone Pearce | Australia | Will Marq | 72.391 | 16 Q | 74.438 | 20 Q | 75.646 | 16 |
| Therese Nilshagen | Sweden | Navarro | 72.376 | 17 Q | 70.167 | 25 | | |
| Carina Cassøe Krüth | Denmark | Heiline's Danciera | 72.174 % | 18 Q | 72.371 | 19 | | |
| Patrik Kittel | Sweden | Touchdown | 72.096 | 19 Q | 73.191 | 17 | | |
| Maria von Essen | Sweden | Invoice | 72.080 | 20 Q | 75.274 | 9 Q | 72.168 | 18 |
| Nadja Aaboe Sloth | Denmark | Favour Gersdorf | 71.956 | 21 Q | 73.723 | 16 Q | 79.386 | 11 |
| Brittany Fraser-Beaulieu | Canada | Jaccardo | 71.926 | 22 Q | 69.271 | 27 | | |
| Henri Ruoste | Finland | Tiffany's Diamond | 71.817 | 23 Q | 72.188 | 21 Q | 75.468 | 17 |
| João Miguel Torrao | Portugal | Lirio MVL | 71.398 | 24 Q | 71.398 | 23 | | |
| Julio Mendoza Loor | Ecuador | Jewel's Goldstrike | 71.304 | 25 Q | 71.505 | 22 | | |
| Christian Simonson | United States of America | Fleau de Baian | 71.304 | 25 Q | 68.456 | 29 | | |
| José Antonio Garcia Mena | Spain | Gladiador Do Lis | 71.134 | 27 Q | 69.043 | 28 | | |
| Maria Caetano | Portugal | Hit Plus | 71.025 | 28 Q | 71.125 | 24 | | |
| Felicita Simoncic | Austria | Four Legends | 70.730 | 29 Q | 70.076 | 26 | | |
| João Victor Marcari Oliva | Brazil | Feel Good VO NRW | 70.714 | 30 Q | 65.349 | 30 | | |
| Kasey Perry-Glass | United States of America | Heartbeat W.P. | 70.606 | 31 | | | | |
| Camille Carier Bergeron | Canada | Finnlanderin | 70.559 | 32 | | | | |
| Diana Porsche | Hungary | Imhotep | 70.264 | 33 | | | | |
| João Pedro Moreira | Portugal | Drosa Fuerst Kennedy OLD | 70.202 | 34 | | | | |
| Jeroen Devroe | Belgium | Lestor | 69.690 | 35 | | | | |
| Rowena Weggelaar | Netherlands | Don Quichot | 69.503 | 36 | | | | |
| Fiona Bigwood | Great Britain | Donna Bella | 69.348 | 37 | | | | |
| Borja Carrascosa | Spain | Frizzantino FRH | 69.332 | 38 | | | | |
| Bettina Kendlbacher | Austria | Broadmoars Don Alfredo AWÖ | 69.084 | 39 | | | | |
| Nicolas Wagner | Luxembourg | Quarter Back Junior FRH | 68.944 | 40 | | | | |
| Severo Jurado Lopez | Spain | Flaconi W | 68.913 | 41 | | | | |
| Delia Eggenberger | Switzerland | Santa Maria | 68.742 | 42 | | | | |
| Rebecca Mauléon | Sweden | Johnnie Walker BCN | 68.711 | 43 | | | | |
| Ashley Holzer | United States of America | Hawtins San Floriana | 68.711 | 43 | | | | |
| Pauline Basquin | France | Sertorius de Rima Z Ifce | 68.696 | 45 | | | | |
| Vasco Mira Godinho | Portugal | Marques Dos Cedros | 68.680 | 46 | | | | |
| Ulrike Prunthaller | Austria | Fleur TSF | 68.665 | 47 | | | | |
| Ville Vaurio | Finland | Dante NL | 68.509 | 48 | | | | |
| Lucia Gallardo | Spain | Hip By Johnson | 68.370 | 49 | | | | |
| James Connor | Ireland | Vanotti | 68.276 | 50 | | | | |
| Charlotte Lenherr | Switzerland | Dettori | 68.261 | 51 | | | | |
| Wim Verwimp | Belgium | Jedai de Massa | 68.121 | 52 | | | | |
| Justina Vanagaitė | Lithuania | Nabab | 68.106 | 53 | | | | |
| Denielle Gallagher | Canada | Come Back de Massa | 68.074 | 54 | | | | |
| Alexandre Ayache | France | Ruling Oliva | 67.950 | 55 | | | | |
| Estelle Wettstein | Switzerland | Quaterboy | 67.795 | 56 | | | | |
| Meagan Davis | United States of America | Toronto Lightfood | 67.624 | 57 | | | | |
| Alizee Roussel | France | Bel Amour | 67.407 | 58 | | | | |
| Roy First | Poland | Infinity Win T | 67.282 | 59 | | | | |
| Mary Hanna | Australia | Ivanhoe | 67.267 | 60 | | | | |
| Yvonne Losos de Muñiz | Dominican Republic | Idwinaretto | 67.158 | 61 | | | | |
| William Matthew | Australia | Faye 43 | 67.019 | 62 | | | | |
| Aleksandra Poplawska-Slazak | Poland | Sambalito | 66.786 | 63 | | | | |
| Hubert Jankowski | Poland | Guaerlain | 66.506 | 64 | | | | |
| Chris von Martels | Canada | Londoncrown | 66.320 | 65 | | | | |
| Kevin Acres | Ireland | Ganesh | 66.289 | 66 | | | | |
| Nuno Chaves De Almeida | Brazil | Noga | 66.273 | 67 | | | | |
| Micah Deligdish | Israel | Carpe Diem de Massa | 65.978 | 68 | | | | |
| Theodora Livanos | Greece | Robinvale | 65.714 | 69 | | | | |
| Caroline Chew | Singapore | Zatchmo | 65.652 | 70 | | | | |
| Bertrand Liegard | France | Ginger | 65.637 | 71 | | | | |
| Anu Sironen | Finland | Ypajan Fioretto | 65.373 | 72 | | | | |
| Yessin Rahmouni | Morocco | Kind of Magic | 65.357 | 73 | | | | |
| Thamar Zweistra | Netherlands | Mr. Magnum | 65.342 | 74 | | | | |
| Murilo Augusto Machado | Brazil | Jorge V.O. | 65.093 | 75 | | | | |
| Suphajit Vuntanadit | Thailand | Wall Street JV | 65.078 | 76 | | | | |
| Warwick McLean | Australia | Le Special | 64.984 | 77 | | | | |
| Alex Baker | Ireland | Top Gear | 64.596 | 78 | | | | |
| Gabriele Kiefer | Cyprus | Ophelia | 63.913 | 78 | | | | |
| Jessica Dunn | Ireland | Dan Its Carston | 63.401 | 80 | | | | |
| Pakjira Thongpakdi | Thailand | Definitely | 63.230 | 81 | | | | |
| Dara Ninggar Prameswari | Indonesia | Miestral d'Ferraria | 63.121 | 82 | | | | |
| Carolina Cordoba Wolf | Mexico | Isabella | 62.702 | 83 | | | | |
| Stella Hagelstam | Finland | Hagels Prince Nassak | 62.516 | 84 | | | | |
| Santiago Ortiz Diez | Mexico | Waitoni | 61.242 | 85 | | | | |
| Manuel Rodrigues Tavares De Almeida Neto | Brazil | Hermes | 60.761 | 86 | | | | |
| Pavlina Révész | Hungary | Jiodinus PP | 59.255 | 87 | | | | |
| Peter Gmoser | Austria | Dante's Daiquiri | 59.037 | 88 | | | | |
| Rotem Jale Ibrahimzadeh | Turkey | Double Dutch | EL | 89 | | | | |
| Wendi Williamson | New Zealand | Don Vito MH | EL | 90 | | | | |
| Suphakamol Vuntanadit | Thailand | Dreamboat BCN | EL | 91 | | | | |
