= Individual dressage at the 2025 European Dressage Championships =

2025 European Dressage Championships

The individual dressage at the 2025 FEI European Dressage Championships in Crozet, France was held at Jiva Hill Stables from 26 to 31 August.

Belgium's Justin Verboomen won the gold medal both in the Grand Prix Special and the Grand Prix Freestyle, becoming the first Belgian rider to win an individual medal in dressage and also the first ever Belgian to win a golden medal in a dressage Championship in general. Cathrine Dufour representing Denmark won a silver medal in the Grand Prix Special and the Grand Prix Freestyle. Isabell Werth of Germany won a bronze in both the Special and Freestyle.

== Competition format ==
The team and individual dressage competitions used the same results. Dressage had three phases. The first phase was the Grand Prix. Top 30 individuals advanced to the second phase, the Grand Prix Special where the first individual medals were awarded. The last set of medals at the 2025 European Dressage Championships was awarded after the third phase, the Grand Prix Freestyle where top 18 combinations competed. Only three riders per country are allowed to compete in the final Freestyle. If a country has four riders qualified for the Freestyle, only the best three are able to ride the Freestyle, and the remaining place(s) moves to the next combination(s) in line.

== Officials ==
The Ground Jury during the 2025 European Dressage Championships was nominated as followed;

- (France) Raphaël Saleh (Ground Jury President)
- (United States) Janet Foy (Ground Jury Member)
- (Germany) Katrina Wüt (Ground Jury Member)
- (Denmark) Hans-Christian Matthiesen (Ground Jury Member)
- (United Kingdom) Peter Storr (Ground Jury Member)
- (Netherlands) Maarten Van Der Heijden (Ground Jury Member)
- (Luxembourg) Christof Umbach (Ground Jury Member)
- (Portugal) Carlos Lopes (Technical Delegate)

== Schedule ==
All times are Central European Summer Time (UTC+2)

Date	Time	Round
Wednesday, 27 August 2025	10:00	Grand Prix (Day 1)
Thursday, 28 August 2025	14:00	Grand Prix (Day 2)
Friday, 29 August 2025	10:00	Grand Prix Special
Sunday, 31 August 2025	11:00	Grand Prix Freestyle

== Results ==
Rider	Nation	Horse	GP score	Rank	GPS score	Rank	GPF score	Rank
Cathrine Laudrup-Dufour	Denmark	Freestyle	80.823	1 Q	81.687	(silver) Q	89.821	2nd place, silver medalist(s)
Isabell Werth	Germany	Wendy de Fontaine	79.224	2 Q	79.027	(bronze) Q	88.046	3rd place, bronze medalist(s)
Justin Verboomen	Belgium	Zonik Plus	79.084	3 Q	82.371	(gold) Q	89.964	1st place, gold medalist(s)
Dinja van Liere	Netherlands	Hermes	76.941	4 Q	75.486	8 Q	77.782	13
Carl Hester	Great Britain	Fame	76.087	5 Q	76.383	6 Q	81.029	7
Charlotte Fry	Great Britain	Glamourdale	75.869	6 Q	75.289	9 Q	79.579	10
Katharina Hemmer	Germany	Denoix PCH	75.699	7 Q	78.678	4 Q	78.882	11
Becky Moody	Great Britain	Jagerbomb	74.829	8 Q	77.796	5 Q	86.982	4
Frederic Wandres	Germany	Bluetooth OLD	74.721	9 Q	75.942	7 Q	81.771	5
Isabel Freese	Norway	Total Hope OLD	74.146	10 Q	74.316	10 Q	80.593	8
Maria von Essen	Sweden	Invoice	73.804	11 Q	72.720	14 Q	80.193	9
Patrik Kittel	Sweden	Touchdown	73.758	12 Q	72.553	15 Q	81.139	6
João Pedro Moreira	Portugal	Drosa Fierst Kennedy OLD	72.578	13 Q	71.277	17 Q	75.521	16
Sandra Sysojeva	Poland	Maxima Bella	72.453	14 Q	72.811	12 Q	77.257	15
Larissa Pauluis	Belgium	Flambeau	72.329	15 Q	73.283	11 Q	77.768	14
Henri Ruoste	Finland	Tiffany's Diamond	72.127	16 Q	69.772	25		
Andreas Helgstrand	Denmark	Jovian	71.335	17 Q	69.666	26		
Nadja Aaboe Sloth	Denmark	Favour Gersdorf	71.227	18 Q	72.811	12 Q	77.829	12
Thamar Zweistra	Netherlands	Luxuriouzz NOPT	70.932	19 Q	70.532	20		
Tinne Vilhelmson-Silfven	Sweden	Hyatt	70.373	20 Q	70.821	18 Q	74.704	17
Marieke van der Putten	Netherlands	Zantana OLD	70.264	21 Q	70.395	21		
Beatriz Ferrer Salat	Spain	Elegance	70.077	22 Q	70.319	22		
Sofie Lexner	Sweden	Inoraline	70.000	23 Q	69.565	27		
Rikke Dupont	Denmark	Grand Galiano	70.000	23 Q	69.787	24		
Maria Caetano	Portugal	Hit Plus	69.985	25 Q	70.167	23		
Fie Christine Skarsoe	Luxembourg	Imperador Dos Cedros	69.922	25 Q	68.982	29		
Borja Carrascosa	Spain	Frizzantino FRH	69.736	25 Q	68.404	30		
Ingrid Klimke	Germany	Vayron NRW	69.348	28 Q	71.389	16		
João Miguel Torrao	Portugal	Lirio MVL	69.053	29 Q	69.073	28		
Nicolas Wagner	Luxembourg	Quater Back Junior FRH	68.882	30 Q	70.562	19 Q	73.839	18
Rowena Weggelaar	Netherlands	Don Quichot	68.835	31				
Katarzyna Milczarek	Poland	Guapo	68.817	32				
Charlotta Rogerson	Switzerland	Bonheur De La Vie	68.680	33				
Domien Michiels	Belgium	Intermezzo Van Het Meerdaalhof	68.649	34				
Pauline Basquin	France	Sertorius de Rima Z IFCE	68.587	35				
Bettina Kendlbacher	Austria	Don Alfredo AWO	68.478	36				
Charlotte Defalque	Belgium	Botticelli	68.478	36				
Stefan Lehfellner	Austria	Roberto Carlos MT	68.385	38				
Máté Garai	Hungary	Vitus 95	68.323	39				
Alexandre Ayache	France	Ruling Olivia	68.152	40				
Nathalie Wahlund	Italy	Gorglintgards Scorpion	67.857	41				
Jessica Neuhauser	Switzerland	Rockson	67.453	42				
Anne-Sophie Serre	France	Jibraltar De Massa	67.407	43				
Maria Klementieva	Cyprus	Gammelengards Zappa	67.267	44				
Delia Eggenberger	Switzerland	Santa Maria	66.351	45				
Bertrand Liegard	France	Ginger	66.227	46				
Teia Hernandez Vila	Spain	Romero De Trujillo	66.196	47				
Ilona Janas	Poland	Dark Knight	65.699	48				
Jenni Matilda Schmechel	Finland	Zagal Azores	65.497	49				
Gabriele H. Kiefer	Cyprus	Ophelia	65.450	50				
Rotem Jale Ibrahimzadeh	Turkey	Double Dutch	65.109	51				
Susanne Krohn	Poland	Titolas	65.078	52				
Grete Ayache	Estonia	Vertigo	64.922	53				
Nuno Palma Santos	Portugal	Fortunity S FRH	64.472	54				
Joanna Robinson	Finland	Glamouraline	64.131	55				
Charlotte Lenherr	Switzerland	Dettori	63.882	56				
Berill Szoke Tóth	Hungary	Velasco 7	63.432	57				
Fransisco Benitez Sanchez	Spain	Lord Platinum	63.276	58				
Dalia Katinaite-Pranckeviciene	Lithuania	Amica	61.988	59				
Andrew Gould	Great Britain	Indigro	EL	-				
Florian Bacher	Austria	Fidertraum OLD	EL	-				
Anikó Komjáthy-Losonczy	Hungary	Dior S	WD	-				

=== Team ranking ===
Country	Total	Rank
Germany	229.644	1st place, gold medalist(s)
Great Britain	226.785	2nd place, silver medalist(s)
Denmark	223.385	3rd place, bronze medalist(s)
Belgium	220.062	4
Netherlands	218.137	5
Sweden	217.935	6
Portugal	211.616	7
Poland	206.969	8
Spain	206.009	9
France	204.146	10
Switzerland	202.484	11
Finland	201.755	12
Hungary	EL	-
Austria	EL	-
