= Equestrian at the 2024 Summer Olympics – Individual dressage =

Individual dressage at the Games of the XXXIII Olympiad
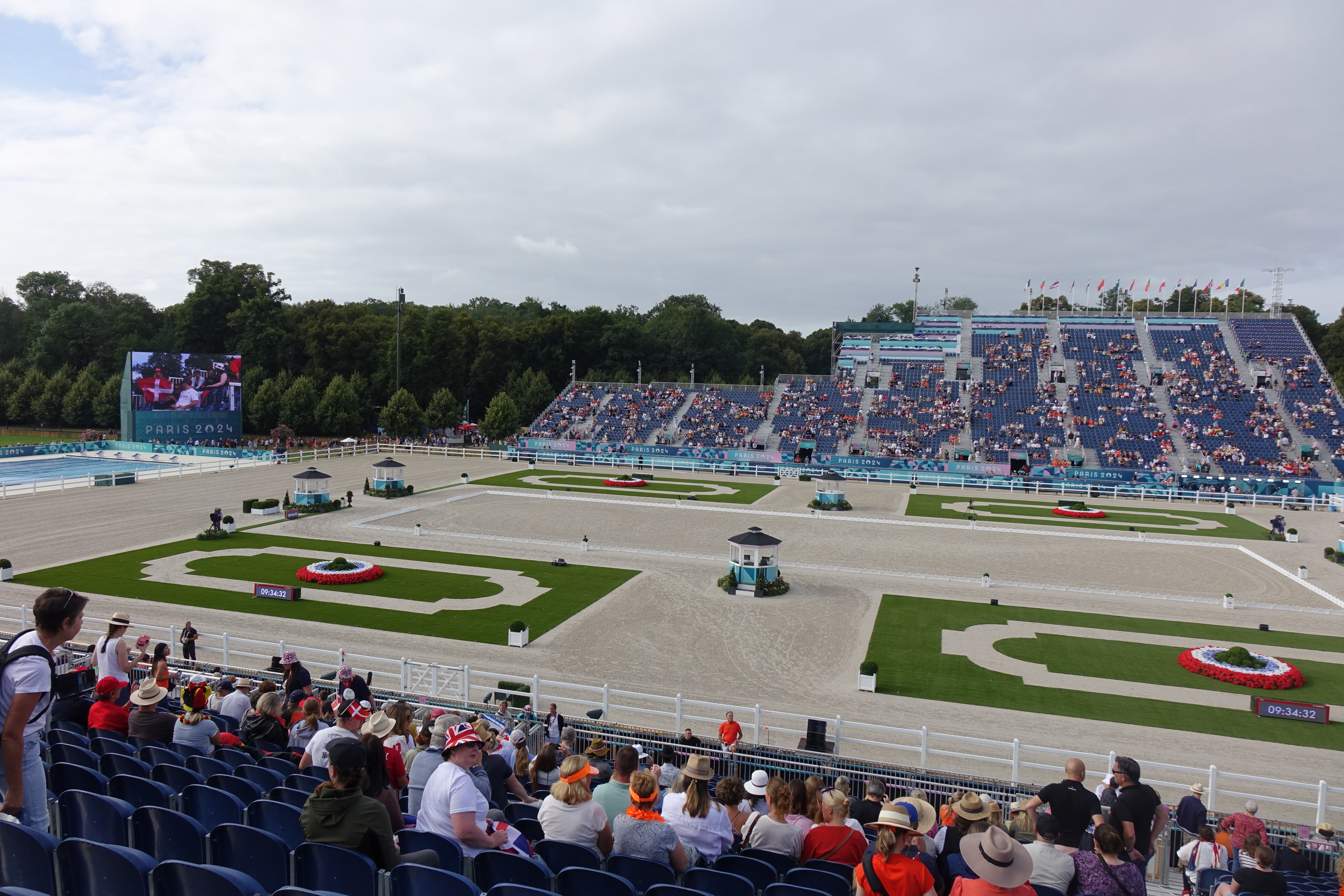
- Olympic equestrian dressage arena
- Venue: Palace of Versailles
- Date: 30 July – 4 August 2024
- Competitors: 60 from 30 nations

Medalists
1st place, gold medalist(s)		Jessica von Bredow-Werndl	Germany
2nd place, silver medalist(s)		Isabell Werth	Germany
3rd place, bronze medalist(s)		Charlotte Fry	Great Britain

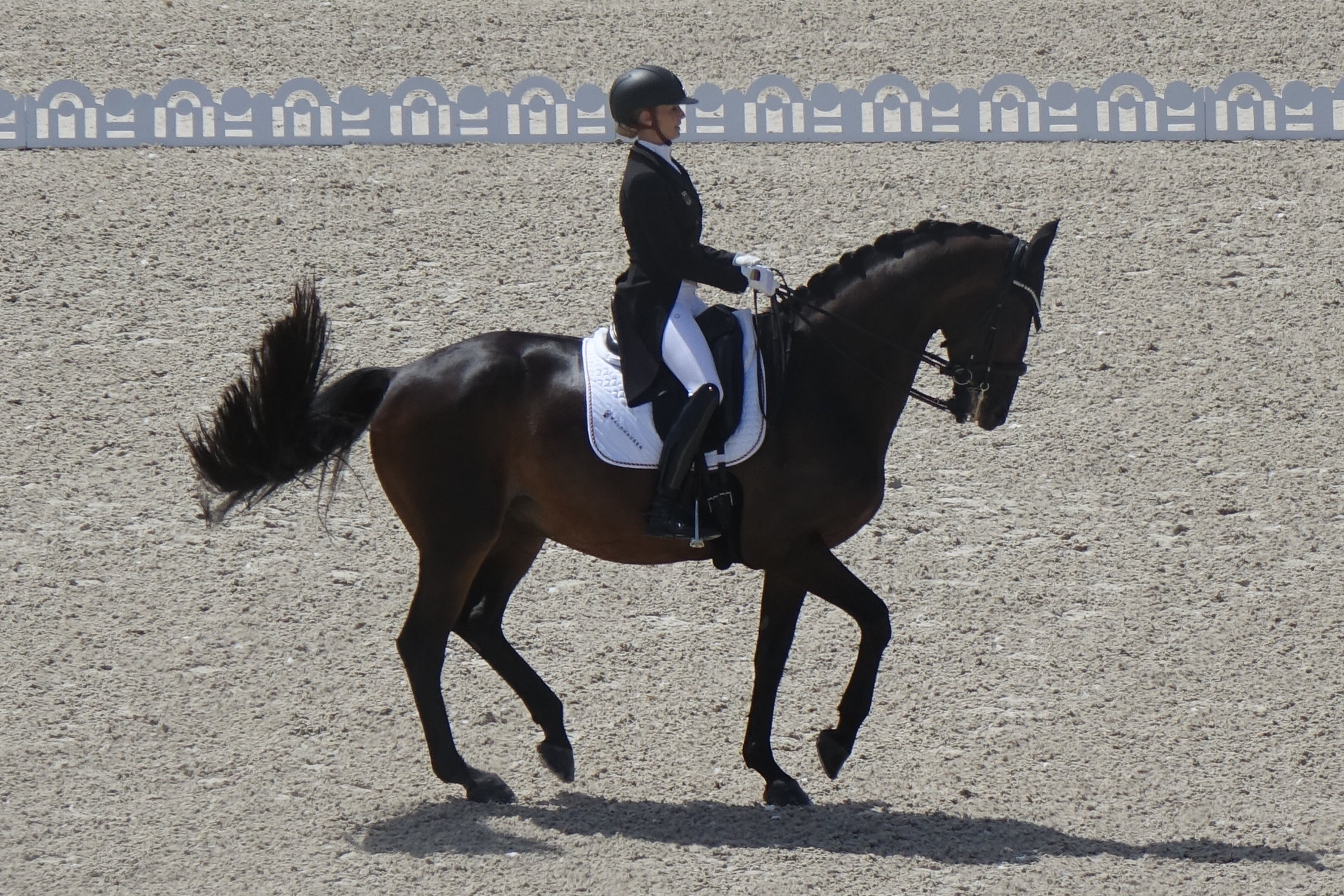
Jessica von Bredow-Werndl of Germany won the Grand Prix and Grand Prix Freestyle

The individual dressage event at the 2024 Summer Olympics took place from 30 July to 4 August 2024 at the Palace of Versailles. Like all other equestrian events, the dressage competition is open-gender, with both male and female athletes competing in the same division. 60 riders from 30 nations are expected to compete.

== Background ==
This was the 26th appearance of the event, which has been held at every Summer Olympics since 1912.

The two-time reigning Olympic champion is Jessica von Bredow-Werndl of Germany (riding Dalera). The reigning (2022) World Champion is Charlotte Fry of Great Britain.

An Olympics.com preview of equestrian (all events) provided the following overview:

Germany has won the most gold medals in Olympic equestrian sports, reflecting the country's equestrian heritage and passion for the sport. Michael Jung has dominated individual eventing at recent Games, winning gold in both London 2012, Rio 2016 and Paris 2024. Jung was destined to carve his name into equestrian history: both his father and grandfather were well-known equestrian athletes. Sweden, France, Netherlands, the USA and Great Britain are among the other leading nations in equestrian sport.

== Qualification ==
A National Olympic Committee (NOC) could enter up to 3 qualified riders in the individual dressage. Quota places are allocated to the NOC, which selects the riders. There were 60 quota places available, allocated as follows:

- Team members (45 places): Each of the 15 NOCs qualified in the team dressage event entered its 3 team members in the individual dressage event.
- Ranking (15 places): The top 2 riders (1 per NOC, and excluding NOCs with qualified teams) in each of the 7 geographic regions were to receive a quota places, with one final quota place based on rankings regardless of geographic region. The two Americas regions were combined.

== Competition format ==
The competition format has changed dramatically since the 2016 format. The competition has dropped from three rounds to two; moreover, advancement is now determined first by place in group rather than overall place (though there are lucky loser places available). The two rounds of the competition are the Grand Prix and the Grand Prix Freestyle.

- Grand Prix: All 60 riders compete in the Grand Prix. They are divided into 6 groups of 10; 3 groups will go on each day of the round. The top 2 riders in each group, along with the next best 6 overall, advance to the Grand Prix Freestyle. The Grand Prix is also the qualifying round for the team event.
- Grand Prix Freestyle: The 18 riders competing receive a final rank based only on the Grand Prix Freestyle score (the Grand Prix scores do not carry over).

== Schedule ==
The event takes place on three competition days over six days, with two days for the Grand Prix followed by two rest days, the team final day, then the individual Grand Prix Freestyle.

All times are European Central Time (UTC+1).

Day	Date	Start	Finish	Phase
Day 1	Tuesday 30 July 2024	11:00	16:30	Grand Prix Day 1
Day 2	Wednesday 31 July 2024	10:00	15:30	Grand Prix Day 2
Day 6	Sunday 4 August 2024	10:00	14:00	Grand Prix Freestyle

== Results ==
=== Grand Prix ===
The top two athletes from each group, and the six athletes with the next best scores (a multi-step tiebreaker would be used for ties, finally broken by random draw will qualify to the individual final (Grand Prix Freestyle).

Rank	Group	Rider	Nation	Horse	GP score	Notes
1	F	Jessica von Bredow-Werndl	Germany	TSF Dalera	82.065	Q
2	D	Cathrine Laudrup-Dufour	Denmark	Freestyle	80.792	Q
3	D	Isabell Werth	Germany	Wendy	78.913	Q
4	A	Charlotte Fry	Great Britain	Glamourdale	78.028	Q
5	A	Nanna Skodborg Merrald	Denmark	Zepter	78.028	Q
6	A	Dinja van Liere	Netherlands	Hermes	77.764	Q
7	A	Carl Hester	Great Britain	Fame	77.345	Q
8	B	Daniel Bachmann Andersen	Denmark	Vayron	76.910	Q
9	D	Isabel Freese	Norway	Total Hope	76.817	Q
10	B	Frederic Wandres	Germany	Bluetooth	76.118	Q
11	C	Becky Moody	Great Britain	Jagerbomb	74.938	Q
12	E	Emmelie Scholtens	Netherlands	Indian Rock	74.581	Q
13	C	Patrik Kittel	Sweden	Touchdown	74.317	Q
14	E	Victoria Max-Theurer	Austria	FH Abbeglen	74.301	Q
15	E	Therese Nilshagen	Sweden	Dante Weltino	73.991	Q
16	F	Pauline Basquin	France	Sertorius de Rima Z	73.711	Q
17	B	Emma Kanerva	Finland	Greek Air	73.680	Q
18	E	Sandra Sysojeva	Poland	Maxima Bella	73.416	Q
19	B	Flore de Winne	Belgium	Flynn FRH	73.028	
20	C	Adrienne Lyle	United States	Helix	72.593	
21	F	Hans Peter Minderhoud	Netherlands	Toto Jr.	72.578	
22	D	Domien Michiels	Belgium	Intermezzo V/H Meerdaalhof	72.531	
23	C	Larissa Pauluis	Belgium	Flambeau	72.127	
24	F	Nicolas Wagner	Luxembourg	Quarter Back Junior FRH	71.988	
25	B	Juliette Ramel	Sweden	Buriël K.H.	71.553	
26	D	Florian Bacher	Austria	Escorial	71.009	
27	E	Julio Mendoza Loor	Ecuador	Goldstrike	70.839	
28	F	Borja Carrascosa	Spain	Frizzantino FRH	70.823	
29	A	Corentin Pottier	France	Gotilas du Feauillard	70.683	
30	D	Henri Ruoste	Finland	Tiffanys Diamond	70.621	
31	E	Alexandre Ayache	France	Jolene	70.279	
32	F	Simone Pearce	Australia	Destano	70.171	
33	A	João Oliva	Brazil	Feel Good VO	70.093	
34	C	Hwang Young-shik	South Korea	Delmonte 7	70.000	
35	E	William Matthew	Australia	Mysterious Star	69.953	
36	C	Claudio Castilla Ruiz	Spain	Hi-Rico Do Sobral	69.829	
37	B	Abigail Lyle	Ireland	Giraldo	69.441	
38	A	Justina Vanagaite	Lithuania	Nabab	69.208	
39	A	Jayden Brown	Australia	Quincy B	68.991	
40	F	Melissa Galloway	New Zealand	Windermere J'Obei W	68.913	
41	A	Naima Moreira Laliberte	Canada	Statesman	68.711	
42	D	Yessin Rahmouni	Morocco	All At Once	68.696	
43	F	Camille Carier Bergeron	Canada	Finnländerin	68.338	
44	E	Rita Ralao Duarte	Portugal	Irao	68.261	
45	A	Stefan Lehfellner	Austria	Roberto Carlos MT	68.183	
46	B	Patricia Ferrando	Venezuela	Honnaisseur	67.143	
47	B	Katarzyna Milczarek	Poland	Guapo	66.910	
48	B	António do Vale	Portugal	Fine Fellow H	66.910	
49	C	Chris von Martels	Canada	Eclips	66.863	
50	C	Maria Caetano	Portugal	Hit Plus	66.630	
51	F	Steffen Peters	United States	Suppenkasper	66.490	
52	D	Anush Agarwalla	India	Sir Caramello OLD	66.444	
53	C	Alisa Glinka	Moldova	Abercrombie	66.056	
54	E	Joanna Robinson	Finland	Glamouraline	65.630	
55	C	Andrina Suter	Switzerland	Fibonacci	65.590	
56	A	Caroline Chew	Singapore	Zatchmo	63.351	
57	E	Yvonne Losos de Muniz	Dominican Republic	Aquamarijn	61.211	
58	D	Juan Antonio Jiménez	Spain	Euclides MOR	60.171	
59	F	Aleksandra Szulc	Poland	Breakdance	60.078	
–	B	Marcus Orlob	United States	Jane	EL	

=== Grand Prix Freestyle ===
The top eighteen riders from the Grand Prix competed in the individual freestyle final in which the individual medals were awarded.

Rank	Rider	Nation	Horse	GPF score	Notes
1st place, gold medalist(s)	Jessica von Bredow-Werndl	Germany	TSF Dalera	90.093	
2nd place, silver medalist(s)	Isabell Werth	Germany	Wendy	89.614	
3rd place, bronze medalist(s)	Charlotte Fry	Great Britain	Glamourdale	88.971	
4	Dinja van Liere	Netherlands	Hermes	88.432	
5	Cathrine Laudrup-Dufour	Denmark	Freestyle	88.093	
6	Carl Hester	Great Britain	Fame	85.161	
7	Daniel Bachmann Andersen	Denmark	Vayron	84.850	
8	Becky Moody	Great Britain	Jagerbomb	84.357	
9	Nanna Skodborg Merrald	Denmark	Zepter	83.293	
10	Isabel Freese	Norway	Total Hope OLD	83.050	
11	Emmelie Scholtens	Netherlands	Indian Rock	81.750	
12	Emma Kanerva	Finland	Greek Air	81.607	
13	Frederic Wandres	Germany	Bluetooth OLD	81.350	
14	Patrik Kittel	Sweden	Touchdown	80.854	
15	Sandra Sysojeva	Poland	Maxima Bella	80.075	
16	Pauline Basquin	France	Sertorius de Rima Z	79.118	
17	Victoria Max-Theurer	Austria	Abbeglen FH NRW	75.375	
18	Therese Nilshagen	Sweden	Dante Welting OLD	74.714	
