= Individual dressage at the 2022 FEI World Championships =

The individual dressage at the 2022 FEI World Championships in Herning, Denmark was held from 6 to 14 August.

Great Britain's Charlotte Fry won the gold medal in both Grand Prix Special and Grand Prix Freestyle. Cathrine Laudrup-Dufour representing Denmark won a silver medal in both the Grand Prix Special and the Grand Prix Freestyle. Dinja van Liere of the Netherlands won a bronze medal in special and the Freestyle.

== Competition format ==
The team and individual dressage competitions used the same results. Dressage had three phases. The first phase was the Grand Prix. Top 30 individuals advanced to the second phase, the Grand Prix Special where the first individual medals were awarded. The last set of medals at the 2022 World Dressage Championships was awarded after the third phase, the Grand Prix Freestyle where top 15 combinations competed.

== Results ==
Rider	Nation	Horse	GP score	Rank	GPS score	Rank	GPF score	Rank
Cathrine Laudrup-Dufour	Denmark	Vamos Amigos	81.864	1 Q	81.322	2nd place, silver medalist(s)	89.411	2nd place, silver medalist(s)
Charlotte Fry	Great Britain	Glamourdale	80.838	2 Q	82.508	1st place, gold medalist(s)	90.654	1st place, gold medalist(s)
Dinja van Liere	Netherlands	Hermes	78.835	3 Q	79.407	3rd place, bronze medalist(s)	86.900	3rd place, bronze medalist(s)
Charlotte Dujardin	Great Britain	Imhotep	77.407	4 Q	77.523	6 Q	83.132	10
Isabell Werth	Germany	DSP Quantaz	77.127	5 Q	79.073	4 Q	83.339	9
Benjamin Werndl	Germany	Famoso OLD	77.003	6 Q	78.237	5 Q	85.893	4
Carina Cassøe Krüth	Denmark	Heiline's Danciera	76.863	7 Q	75.426	12 Q	82.143	12
Nanna Merrald Rasmussen	Denmark	Blue Hors Zack	76.724	8 Q	73.000	22		
Frederic Wandres	Germany	Duke of Britain FRH	76.661	9 Q	WD	30		
Daniel Bachmann Andersen	Denmark	Marshall-Bell	76.584	10 Q	76.520	8 Q	83.464	8
Patrik Kittel	Sweden	Touchdown	76.522	10 Q	75.486	10 Q	83.679	7
Juliette Ramel	Sweden	Buriel K.H.	76.161	12 Q	75.456	11 Q	80.682	13
Gareth Hughes	Great Britain	Classic Briolinca	75.978	13 Q	77.280	7 Q	84.043	5
Ingrid Klimke	Germany	Franziskus	75.683	14 Q	73.526	19		
Steffen Peters	United States of America	Suppenkasper	74.767	15 Q	73.708	17		
Therese Nilshagen	Sweden	Dante Weltino OLD	74.456	16 Q	74.848	13 Q	83.046	11
Emmelie Scholtens	Netherlands	Indian Rock	74.410	17 Q	74.164	14 Q	74.589	15
Adrienne Lyle	United States of America	Salvino	74.394	18 Q	75.699	9 Q	83.704	6
Simone Pearce	Australia	Fiderdance	73.463	19 Q	72.584	25		
Florian Bacher	Austria	Fidertraum OLD	73.447	20 Q	73.571	18		
Nicolas Wagner Ehlinger	Luxembourg	Quater Back Junior FRH	773.438	21 Q	72.705	24		
Emma Kanerva	Finland	Greek Air	73.028	22 Q	72.149	26		
Alejandro Sánchez del Barco	Spain	Quincallo de Indalo	72.842	23 Q	74.073	15 Q	78.386	14
Thamar Zweistra	Netherlands	Ich Weiss	72.376	24 Q	73.359	20		
Lyndal Oatley	Australia	Eros	72.189	25 Q	EL	29		
João Victor Marcari Oliva	Brazil	Escorial Horsecampline	72.112	26 Q	73.313	21		
José Antonio Garcia Mena	Spain	Divina Royal	71.817	27 Q	73.875	16		
João Pedro Moreira	Portugal	Zonik Hit	71.522	28 Q	70.942	28		
Larissa Pauluis	Belgium	First-Step Valentin	71.351	29 Q	71.353	27		
Jose Daniel Martin Dockx	Denmark	Malagueno LXXXIII	71.149	30 Q	72.720	23		
Marieke van der Putten	Netherlands	Torveslettens Titanium RS2	71.118	31				
Morgan Barbançon	France	Sir Donnerhall II OLD	71.009	32				
Melissa Galloway	New Zealand	Windermere J'Obei W	70.978	33				
Katie Duerrhammer	United States of America	Quartett	70.839	34				
Isabel Freese	Norway	Total Hope OLD	70.621	35				
Maria Caetano	Portugal	Fenix de Tineo	70.404	36				
Gretha Ferreira	South Africa	Zidhane	70.000	37				
Pauline Basquin	France	Sertorius de Rima Z IFCE	69.938	38				
Fie Christine Skarsoe	Luxembourg	Imperador Dos Cedros	69.829	39				
Christian Schumach	Austria	Donna Karacho	69.829	39				
Jayden Brown	Australia	Willingapark Sky Diamond	69.674	41				
Stella Hagelstam	Finland	Mount St John Kom Fairy Tale	69.674	41				
Corentin Pottier	France	Gotilas du Feuillard	69.658	43				
Teia Hernandez Vila	Spain	Romero de Trujillo	69.596	44				
Domien Michiels	Belgium	Intermezzo van het Meerdaalhof	69.596	44				
Justina Vanagaitė	Lithuania	Nabab	69.596	44				
Yvonne Losos de Muñiz	Dominican Republic	Aquamarijn	69.379	47				
Mathilde Merethe Klaesson	Norway	Sandbaeks Rio EL	69.317	48				
Gilles Ngovan	Switzerland	Zigzag	69.223	49				
Caroline Chew	Singapore	Tribiani	69.146	50				
Stefan Lehfellner	Austria	Roberto Carlos MT	69.068	51				
Martim Meneres	Portugal	Equador	69.053	52				
Delia Eggenberger	Switzerland	Fairtrade	68.929	53				
Carla Aeberhard	Switzerland	Delioh von Buchmatt CH	68.867	54				
Richard Davison	Great Britain	Bubblingh	68.851	55				
Victoria Max-Theurer	Austria	Birkhof's Topas FBW	68.680	56				
Jeanna Hogberg	Sweden	Astoria	68.664	57				
Anna Merveldt	Ireland	Esporim	68.478	58				
Naima Moreira Laliberte	Canada	Statesman	68.385	59				
Ryan Torkkeli	Canada	Sternenwanderer	68.354	60				
Charlotte Defalque	Belgium	Botticelli	68.354	61				
Alisa Glinka	Moldova	Aachen	68.276	62				
John Thompson	New Zealand	Chemistry	68.059	63				
Mikaela Soratie	Finland	Hot Casanova	67.904	64				
Shingo Hayashi	Japan	Scolari 4	67.873	65				
Anna Tallberg	Finland	Grevens Zorro	67.609	66				
Zaneta Skowronska-Kozubik	Poland	Romantic P	67.547	67				
Alex Baker	Ireland	Dutchman	67.531	68				
Kazuki Sado	Japan	Barolo	67.438	69				
Grete Ayache	Estonia	Farao Da Raia	67.236	70				
Lore Vandeborne	Belgium	Ikke-Pia V/D Bergerhoeve	66.91	71				
Anush Agarwalla	India	Sir Caramello	66.832	72				
Estelle Wettstein	Switzerland	Sir Stanley W	66.553	73				
Kiichi Harada	Japan	Sir Galanto	66.444	74				
Carrie Schopf	Armenia	Saumur	66.289	75				
Abigail Lyle	Ireland	Giraldo	65.714	76				
Anikó Losonczy	Hungary	Dior S	65.481	77				
Yessin Rahmouni	Morocco	All At Once	65.326	78				
Antoine Nowakowski	France	Quarter Girl	65.326	78				
María Aponte	Colombia	Duke de Niro	65.171	80				
Shruti Vora	India	Deninghtron	64.534	81				
Diana Al Shaer	Palestine	Unazalee de Massa	63.836	82				
Vasco Mira Godinho	Portugal	Garrett	63.371	83				
Anna Mierzwinska	Poland	Dean Martin	63.323	84				
Nuno Chaves De Almeida	Brazil	Feel Good VO	62.904	85				
Aleksandra Szulc	Poland	Breakdance	62.717	86				
Trude Hestengen	Norway	Christianslund Furstino	61.773	87				
Ashley Holzer	United States of America	Valentine	61.258	88				
Sorrell Klatzko	Ireland	Turbo	EL	89				
Gaylene Lennard	New Zealand	Jax Johnson	EL	90				
Katarzyna Milczarek	Poland	Guapo	EL	91				
Csaba Szokola	Hungary	Enying	EL	92				
Mary Hanna	Australia	Calanta	WD	93				
