= Equestrian at the 2024 Summer Olympics – Team dressage =

Team dressage at the Games of the XXXIII Olympiad
- Olympic equestrian dressage
- Date: 30 July – 3 August 2024

Medalists
1st place, gold medalist(s)		Jessica von Bredow-Werndl; Frederic Wandres; Isabell Werth; Germany
2nd place, silver medalist(s)		Cathrine Laudrup-Dufour; Daniel Bachmann Andersen; Nanna Skodborg Merrald; Denmark
3rd place, bronze medalist(s)		Charlotte Fry; Carl Hester; Becky Moody; Great Britain

The team dressage event at the 2024 Summer Olympics took place from 30 July to 3 August 2024 at the Palace of Versailles. Like all other equestrian events, the dressage competition is open-gender, with both male and female athletes competing in the same division. 60 riders from 30 nations are expected to compete. In total 15 (fifteen) countries competed in the Grand Prix with a team.

== Competition format ==
The competition format has remained the same as in Tokyo. There are only 3 team members instead of 4, with no dropped score. The two rounds of the competition are the Grand Prix and the Grand Prix Special.

- Grand Prix: All 15 teams compete in the Grand Prix. The top 10 teams, based on the aggregate score of the team's 3 riders, advance to the final round. The Grand Prix is also the qualifying round for the individual event.
- Grand Prix Special: The 10 teams competing receive a final rank based only on the Grand Prix Special score, again the aggregate score of the 3 riders (the Grand Prix scores do not carry over). Grand Prix Special routines may be set to (background) music.

== Schedule ==
The event takes place on three competition days over six days, with two days for the Grand Prix followed by two rest days, the team final day on Saturday with the Grand Prix Special, concluding the individual Grand Prix Freestyle on Sunday.

All times are European Central Time (UTC+1).

Day	Date	Start	Finish	Phase
Day 1	Tuesday 30 July 2024	11:00	16:30	Grand Prix Day 1
Day 2	Wednesday 31 July 2024	10:00	15:30	Grand Prix Day 2
Day 5	Saturday 3 August 2024	10:00	15:30	Grand Prix Special

== Results ==
Grand Prix results
Ranking	Country	Rider	Horse	Individual result	Team result	Note
1	Germany	Frederic Wandres; Isabell Werth; Jessica von Bredow-Werndl	Bluetooth OLD; Wendy; TSF Dalera BB	76.118; 79.363; 82.065	237.546	Q
2	Denmark	Nanna Skodborg Merrald; Daniel Bachmann Andersen; Cathrine Laudrup-Dufour	Zepter; Vayron; Freestyle	78.028; 76.910; 80.792	235.730	Q
3	Great Britain	Carl Hester; Becky Moody; Charlotte Fry	Fame; Jagerbomb; Glamourdale	77.345; 74.938; 78.913	231.196	Q
4	Netherlands	Dinja van Liere; Emmelie Scholtens; Hans Peter Minderhoud	Hermes; Indian Rock; Toto Jr.	77.764; 74.581; 72.578	224.923	Q
5	Sweden	Juliette Ramel; Patrik Kittel; Therese Nilshagen	Buriel K.H. Touchdown; Dante Weltino OLD	71.553; 74.314; 73.991	219.861	Q
6	Belgium	Flore de Winne; Larissa Pauluis; Domien Michiels	Flynn FRH; Flambeau; Intermezzo V/H Meerdaalhof	73.028; 72.127; 72.531	217.686	Q
7	France	Corentin Pottier; Alexandre Ayache; Pauline Basquin	Gotilas du Feuillard; Jolene; Sertorius de Rima Z	70.683; 70.279; 73.711	214.673	Q
8	Austria	Stefan Lehfellner; Florian Bacher; Victoria Max-Theurer	Roberto Carlos MT; Fidertraum OLD; Abegglen FH NRW	68.183; 71.009; 74.301	213.493	Q
9	Finland	Emma Kanerva; Henri Ruoste; Joanna Robinson	Greek Air; Tiffanys Diamond; Glamouraline	73.680; 70.621; 65.637	209.938	Q
10	Australia	Jayden Brown; William Matthew; Simone Pearce	Quincy B Mysterious Star; Destano	68.991; 69.953; 70.171	209.115	Q
11	Canada	Naima Moreira Laliberte; Chris von Martels; Camille Carier Bergeron	Statesman; Eclips; Finnländerin	68.711; 66.863; 68.338	203.912	
12	Portugal	António do Vale; Maria Caetano; Rita Ralao Duarte	Fine Fellow - H Hit Plus; Irao	66.910; 66.630; 68.261	201.801	
13	Spain	Claudio Castilla Ruiz; Juan Antonio Jiménez Cobo; Borja Carrascosa	Hi-Rico do Sobral; Euclides Mor; Frizzantino FRH	69.829; 60.031; 70.823	200.683	
14	Poland	Katarzyna Milczarek; Sandra Sysojeva; Aleksandra Szulc	Guapo; Maxima Bella; Breakdance	66.910; 73.416; 60.078	200.404	
15	United States	Marcus Orlob; Adrienne Lyle; Steffen Peters	Jane; Helix; Suppenkasper	EL. 72.593; 66.491	EL.	

Results Grand Prix Special
Ranking	Country	Rider	Horse	Individual result	Team result
1st place, gold medalist(s)	Germany	Frederic Wandres; Isabell Werth; Jessica von Bredow-Werndl	Bluetooth OLD; Wendy; TSF Dalera BB	75.942; 79.894; 79.954	235.790
2nd place, silver medalist(s)	Denmark	Daniel Bachmann Andersen; Nanna Skodborg Merrald; Cathrine Laudrup-Dufour	Vayron; Zepter; Freestyle	75.973; 78.480; 81.216	235.669
3rd place, bronze medalist(s)	Great Britain	Becky Moody; Carl Hester; Charlotte Fry	Jagerbomb; Fame; Glamourdale	76.489; 76.520; 79.483	232.492
4	Netherlands	Hans Peter Minderhoud; Emmelie Scholtens; Dinja van Liere	Toto Jr. Hermes; Indian Rock	72.644; 70.684; 77.720	221.048
5	Belgium	Domien Michiels; Larissa Pauluis; Flore de Winne	Intermezzo V/H Meerdaalhof; Flambeau; Flynn FRH	72.386; 69.179; 74.149	215.714
6	France	Corentin Pottier; Alexandre Ayache; Pauline Basquin	Gotilas du Feuillard; Jolene; Sertorius de Rima Z	71.748; 70.821; 72.720	215.289
7	Sweden	Juliette Ramel; Therese Nilshagen; Patrik Kittel	Buriel K.H. Dante Weltino OLD; Touchdown	68.830; 69.650; 74.331	212.811
8	Finland	Joanna Robinson; Henri Ruoste; Emma Kanerva	Glamouraline; Tiffanys Diamond; Greek Air	71.322; 66.413; 74.301	212.036
9	Austria	Stefan Lehfellner; Florian Bacher; Victoria Max-Theurer	Roberto Carlos MT; Fidertraum OLD; Abegglen FH NRW	67.143; 70.608; 73.754	211.505
10	Australia	Jayden Brown; William Matthew; Simone Pearce	Quincy B Mysterious Star; Destano	70.152; 69.711; 67.340	207.203
