= 2026 FEI World Cup Finals (show jumping and dressage) =

Dressage event

- Host city: Fort Worth, United States
- Date(s): April 8 – 12, 2026
- Main stadium: Dickies Arena
- Level: Senior
- Type: Indoor
- Events: 2

The 2026 FEI World Cup Finals for dressage and show jumping were held from April 4–8, 2023 in Fort Worth, United States. The event was held in the Dickies Arena and marked the conclusion of the 2025/2026 Dressage and Show jumping World Cup Seasons.

== Overview ==
The 39th edition of the FEI World Cup Finals was back in the US after Omaha, Nebraska hosted the finals in 2023. In Dressage, normally 18 riders qualify for the Finals but some riders troubled with making the trip to the US. Initially, several riders who listed on the top of the FEI World Cup rankings declined to participate at the finals, including Belgium's number one Justin Verboomen and Larissa Pauluis, as well as title defender Charlotte Fry and Isabell Werth. The main reason was the focus on the World Championships in Aachen later in the year, while not making the trip overseas to Texas. Denmark's Carina Cassøe Krüth qualified as well but could not travel because of paperwork issues and Great Britain's Charlotte Dujardin canceled her trip last minute as well, dropping the total number of riders from 18 to 16.

In dressage it was Becky Moody capturing the win both in the Grand Prix as well as the Grand Prix Freestyle with her horse Jägerbomb, winning her first individual medal at a major Championship. In Show-Jumping it was Kent Farrington winning on home soil, also winning his first World Cup title in his career with his horse Toulayna Greya.

== Results ==
=== Dressage Grand Prix Freestyle ===
Rank	Rider	Horse	GPF score
1st place, gold medalist(s)	(United Kingdom) Becky Moody	Jägerbomb	88.330%
2nd place, silver medalist(s)	(United States) Christian Simonson	Indian Rock	83.810%
3rd place, bronze medalist(s)	(Poland) Sandra Sysojeva	Maxima Bella	80.770%
4	(Sweden) Patrik Kittel	Touchdown	80.260%
5	(Germany) Raphael Netz	DSP Dieudonne	79.245%
6	(Ecuador) Julio Mendoza Loor	Jewel's Goldstrike	78.645%
7	(Belgium) Alexa Fairchild	Fairplay	78.005%
8	(Germany) Moritz Treffinger	Fiderdance	77.360%
9	(United States) Kevin Kohmann	Duenensee	76.730%
10	(United States) Ben Ebeling	Bellena	74.965%
11	(Netherlands) Thamar Zweistra	Kingsdale	74.685%
12	(Lithuania) Justina Vanagaitė	Nabab	73.245%
13	(France) Morgan Barbançon	Sir Donnerhall II	72.460%
14	(Austria) Bettina Kendlbacher	Broadmoars Don Alfredo AWO	72.010%
15	(Australia) Serena Ireland	Royalty R	68.545%
16	(Morocco) Yessin Rahmouni	Kind of Magic	64.635%

=== Show jumping top 10 Overall ranking ===
Rank	Rider	Nation
1st place, gold medalist(s)	Kent Farrington	United States
2nd place, silver medalist(s)	Daniel Deusser	Germany
3rd place, bronze medalist(s)	Katherine Dinan	United States
4	Rene Dittmer	Germany
5	Kevin Staut	France
6	Steve Guerdat	Switzerland
7	Aaron Vale	United States
8	Abdel Saïd	Belgium
9	Richard Vogel	Germany
10	Lillie Keenan	United States
