= Andrew Gould =

Andrew Gould may refer to:

- Andrew Gould (businessman) (born 1946), British businessman
- Andrew Gould (judge) (born 1963), American judge
- Andrew Gould (equestrian) (born 1980), British dressage rider
