= Charlotta Rogerson =

Swiss equestrian

Personal information
- Nationality: Switzerland
- Born: March 22, 1998 (age 28) Lucerne, Switzerland
Medal record
Equestrian
Representing Switzerland
World Dressage Breeding Championships
Bronze medal – third place	2024 Ermelo	Individual dressage

Charlotta Rogerson (born March 22, 1998) is a Swiss dressage rider. She competed at two European Dressage Championships, including in 2023 and 2025. Rogerson also competed at several European youth Championships between 2013 and 2022 and World Breeding Championships in 2023 and 2024, where she won a bronze medal. In 2026 she became Swiss national champion in dressage.

Rogerson has been selected to represent the Swiss team at the 2026 FEI World Championships in Aachen.
