= Orlob =

Orlob is a surname. Notable people with the surname include:

- Harold Orlob (1883–1982), American musician
- Marcus Orlob (born 1982), American dressage rider
