= Gabriele Kiefer =

Cypriot equestrian

Gabriele H. Kiefer
Personal information
- Born: May 25, 1967 (age 59) Berlin, Germany

Sport
- Country: Cyprus
- Sport: Equestrian

Achievements and titles
- World finals: Aachen 2026
- Regional finals: Riesenbeck 2023; Crozet 2025

Gabriele Kiefer (born 25 May 1967) is a German-born Cypriot equestrian athlete.

She competed at the European Dressage Championships in 2023 in Riesenbeck, as first Cypriot dressage rider. Also in 2025 she competed at the European Championships, finishing 49th in the individual competition. In 2026 she competed at the 2026 FEI World Championships in Aachen, Germany which was another milestone for the dressage sport in Cyprus. Kiefer competed at all three major Championships with her horse Ophelia.

She began competing internationally for Cyprus in 2018. In 2024 Kiefer was listed on the FEI's Olympic qualification ranking with two horses.
