= Sophie Hinners =

German equestrian

Personal information
- Nationality: German
- Discipline: Show jumping
- Born: 2 December 1997 (age 28)
Medal record
Equestrian
Representing Germany
World Championships
Gold medal – first place	2026 Aachen	Team jumping
European Championships
Bronze medal – third place	2025 La Coruña	Team jumping

Sophie Hinners (born 2 December 1997) is a German equestrian. She was a gold medalist with the German show jumping team at the 2026 FEI World Championships.

== Career ==
Hinners started riding horses in childhood. She had an apprenticeship with Hergen Forkert in Germany. Having been based in the Netherlands in the early part of her career working at Emile Hendrix trading and training stable in Baarlo, she returned to Germany and was based in Pfungstadt. In 2024, she won a 5* Grand Prix for first time in Verona, on Iron Dames My Prins. In doing so, she became the first-ever female winner of the Italian leg of the FEI World Cup series.

Riding Iron Dames My Prins for Germany she was a bronze medalist at the European Show Jumping Championships in 2025 in La Coruña, Spain, in the team jumping competition. Throughout 2025, she had 14 clear rounds in FEI Nations Cup competition, aboard three different horses, earning the title of ‘Ms. Nations Cup 2025’, and finishing the year with two more than Great Britain's Ben Maher with 12 clear rounds and Paris Olympic champion Christian Kukuk in third with nine.

In May 2026, she placed third at CHIO Aachen at the May in the Rolex Grand Prix on Iron Dames Singclair. In August, she was a gold medalist with the German team at the 2026 FEI World Championships in Aachen. 2026.
