= Adrian Whiteway =

British equestrian

Personal information
- Discipline: Show jumping
- Born: 28 June 1990 (age 36)
Medal record
Equestrian
Representing Great Britain
World Championships
Bronze medal – third place	2026 Aachen	Team jumping

Adrian Whiteway (born 28 June 1990) is a British equestrian. He was a medalist with the Great Britain show jumping team at the 2026 FEI World Championships.

== Career ==
Based in Somerset, Whiteway made his debut in a five-star show in Aachen in 2025, and rode the CSI5* classes at Royal Windsor Horse Show in 2026. He competed for Great Britain in the FEI Nations Cup in 2025 and 2026. In August 2026, he was a bronze medalist with the Great Britain showjumping team at the 2026 FEI World Championships in Aachen, riding 13-year old stallion Chacco Volo.

== Personal life ==
Whiteway is from Wraxall, Somerset.
