= Maria von Essen =

Swedish equestrian

Personal information
- Nickname: Mia
- Nationality: Swedish
- Born: July 20, 1980 (age 45)

Sport
- Country: Sweden
- Sport: Equestrian
- Coached by: Kyra Kyrklund

Maria von Essen (born July 20, 1980) is a Swedish dressage rider. She competed at the 2025 FEI European Dressage Championships riding her horse Invoice. Von Essen was also named first reserve for the Swedish team at the 2024 Olympic Games. Von Essen has been selected to represent the Swedish team at the 2026 FEI World Championships in Aachen.

She trains with Finnish former Olympian and trainer Kyra Kyrklund and runs an equestrian business outside Malmo.
