= Rotem Jale Ibrahimzadeh =

Turkish equestrian

Personal information
- Nationality: Turkish
- Born: March 1, 1996 (age 30) Istanbul, Türkiye

Sport
- Country: Turkey
- Sport: Equestrian
- Coached by: Morgan Barbancon
Medal record
Equestrian
Representing Turkey
Balkan Dressage Championships
Gold medal – first place	2013 Yagodovo	Team dressage
Silver medal – second place	2009 Plovdiv	Team dressage
Silver medal – second place	2009 Plovdiv	Individual dressage
Bronze medal – third place	2013 Yagodovo	Individual dressage

Rotem Jale Ibrahimzadeh (born March 1, 1996, Istanbul, Türkiye) is a Turkish dressage rider.

She competed at the 2025 FEI European Dressage Championships riding her horse Hexagon's Double Dutch, writing history for Türkiye for being the first dressage rider at a senior dressage Championship. She also competed at the 2026 FEI World Championships in Aachen, which was another milestone for the rider and Türkiye as dressage country.

Ibrahimzadeh trains with French Olympian Morgan Barbancon.
