= Diana Al Shaer =

Russian-born Palestinian dressage rider

Personal information
- Born: 14 February 1987 (age 39) Moscow, Russia

Sport
- Country: Palestine
- Sport: Equestrian
- Club: KSK Alfares

Achievements and titles
- World finals: 2022 World Equestrian Games

Diana Al Shaer (born 14 February 1987) is a Russian-born Palestinian dressage rider and Cultural diplomat. She represented Palestine at the 2022 World Equestrian Games in Herning where she competed in the individual dressage competition with Unazalee de Massa. By doing so, she became the second Palestinian to compete at the World Equestrian Games after Christian Zimmermann, and the first Arab woman at the Dressage World Championships.

== Life ==
Al Shaer is half Palestinian and half Russian. Al Shaer's father moved to the Russian Federation from Palestine in 1975 and established the Alfares Equestrian Club in Zavidovo, Russia. She lives in The Netherlands where she trains with Danish Olympian Anne van Olst to qualify and prepare for the 2024 Olympic Games in Paris. Al Shaer is cultural diplomat by profession and is currently chair of the Dressage Committee for the FEI Regional Group VII, which covers the Middle East and Northern Africa.

On 7 November 2025, at the FEI General Assembly in Hong Kong, Al Shaer was elected as the Chair of the FEI Dressage Committee. The Dressage Committee is responsible for developing and updating the sport’s regulations, judging standards, and formats for international competitions.
