= Thibeau Spits =

Belgian professional Equestrian

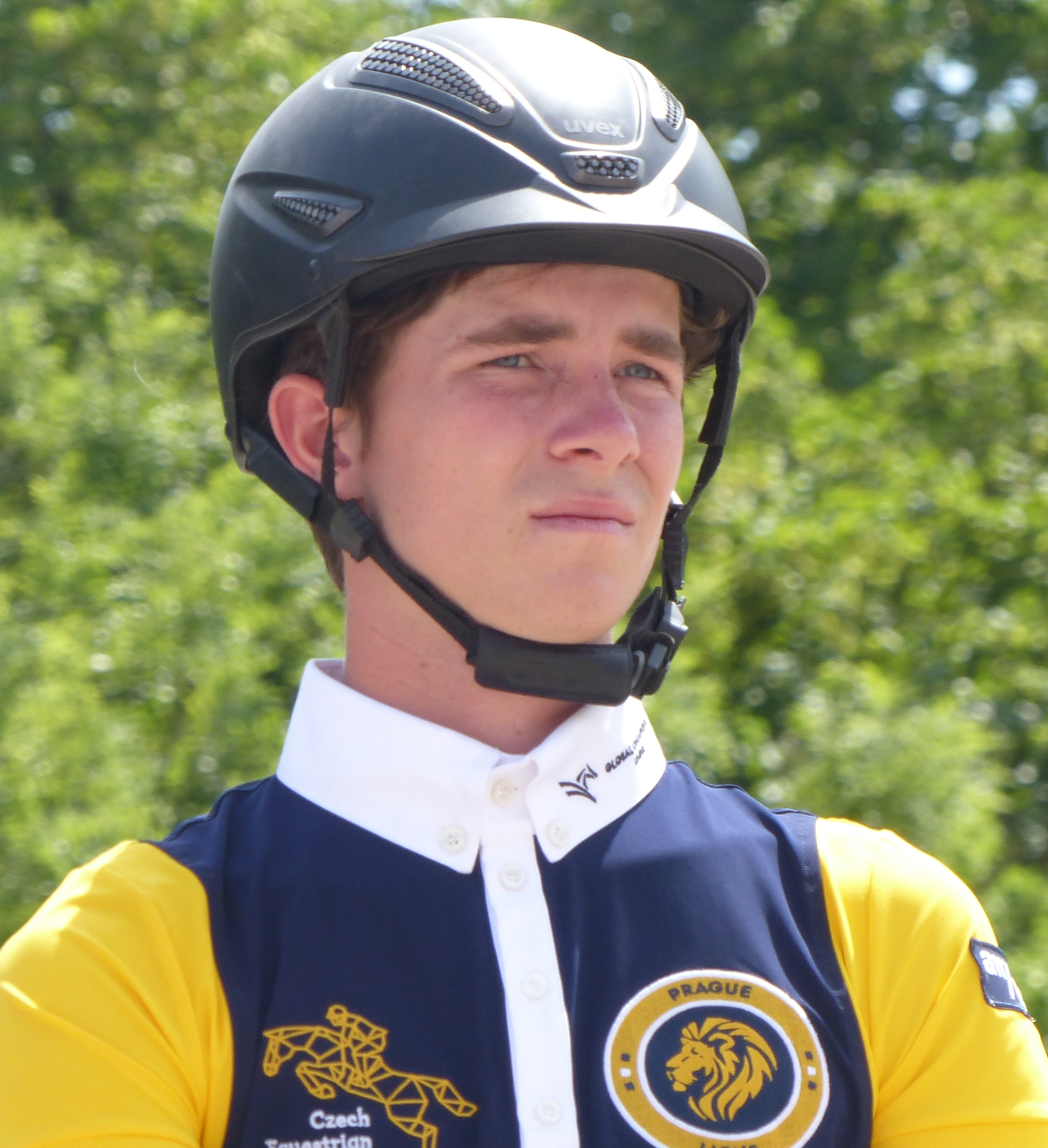
- Spits in 2013

Personal information
- Nationality: Belgian
- Discipline: Show Jumping
- Born: 12 March 2001 (age 25)
Medal record
Representing Belgium
World Championships
Silver medal – second place	2026 Aachen	Jumping
Silver medal – second place	2026 Aachen	Team jumping
European Championships
Gold medal – first place	2025 A Coruña	Team jumping

Thibeau Spits (born March 12, 2001) is a Belgian show jumping rider.

== Career ==
Born into a family of horsemen and enthusiasts, he joined the Belgian team very early on, and represented Belgium in six FEI Jumping European Championships for Young Riders, Juniors and Children winning multiple medals.

In 2025 he won his first international medal at the senior level winning the gold medal in the team jumping event at the FEI European Show Jumping Championships in A Coruña, Spain.

In April 2026, he won his first 5 Star CSI5* Grand Prix, Le Grand Prix du Printemps des Sports équestres de Fontainebleau, France, on Impress-K van’t Kattenheye Z. Riding the same horse in August he won silver medals in both the team and individual jumping events at the 2026 FEI World Championships.

== Personal life ==
Spits hails from a family of horse enthousiasts. His father, Patrick, a former show jumper trains and trades jumping horses at Stal Ceulemans in Sint-Katelijne-Waver, Belgium, which is owned by the family of his mother Kristel Ceulemans.
