= Alexa Fairchild =

Belgian equestrian

Personal information
- Full name: Alexa Fairchild
- Born: Nov 23, 1994 (age 31) New York City, USA
- Website: alexafairchild.com

Sport
- Country: Belgium
- Sport: Equestrian
- Coached by: Anky van Grunsven

Alexa Fairchild (born 23 November 1994, New York) is a Belgian equestrian athlete and fashion designer. Fairchild started riding at a young age and competed in the youth dressage classes, including the European Youth Championships in Compiegne, France where she won a bronze team medal. In 2021 she was named as traveling reserve by the Belgian Equestrian Federation for the 2020 Olympic Games in Tokyo. A month later she competed at the European Dressage Championships in Hagen, Germany.

Besides her equestrian career, Fairchild is also a businesswoman and fashion designer. In 2017 she launched her own clothing brand.
