= Raphael Netz =

German equestrian (born 1999)

Personal information
- Nationality: German
- Born: 24 March 1999 (age 27) Wiesbaden, Germany

Sport
- Country: Germany
- Sport: Equestrian
Medal record
World Championships
Gold medal – first place	2026 Aachen	Team dressage

Raphael Netz (born 24 March 1999) is a German dressage rider. Netz competed at the World Cup Finals in 2024 in Riyadh and at the Finals in 2026 in Forth Worth TX. As young rider he won several medals at the U25 European Championships, including individual gold in 2021 and 2022 as well as team gold in 2019, 2021 and 2022. Netz was the assistant rider of German Olympic champion Jessica von Bredow-Werndl until 2024.

In 2026, Netz was selected to represent Germany at the 2026 FEI World Championships in Aachen.
