= Ryan Torkkeli =

Canadian-Finnish dressage rider

Personal information
- Nationality: Canada, Finland
- Born: 10 November 1981 (age 43) Thunder Bay, Ontario, Canada

Sport
- Country: Canada
- Sport: Equestrian

Achievements and titles
- World finals: Herning 2022

Ryan Torkkeli (born 10 November 1981) is a Canadian-Finnish dressage rider. He competed at the 2022 World Championships in Herning, where he represented the Canadian team. He has won several CDIs in Europe, in Le Mans, Olomouc and Stadl-Paura.

In 2024, Torkkeli was in consideration for team Canada at the 2024 Summer Olympics.

Torkkeli is of Finnish descent and also holds a Finnish passport.
