= Andrina Suter =

Swiss dressage rider

Personal information
- Born: 10 June 1992 (age 34) Schaffhausen, Switzerland

Sport
- Country: Switzerland
- Sport: Equestrian

Achievements and titles
- Olympic finals: 2024 Summer Olympics

Andrina Suter (born 10 June 1992, Schaffhausen, Switzerland) is a Swiss dressage rider. She was very successful a young rider and competed over six European Championships in the Juniors, Young Riders and Under 25 divisions. Suter also represented Switzerland at two World Breeding Championships in 2021 and 2022. Her best result was a fourth place in the six-years old final in 2021.

Suter was nominated by the Swiss Equestrian Federation to represent Switzerland as individual at the 2024 Olympic Games in Paris with her horse Fibonacci. She finished 55th in the Grand Prix competition.
