= Nadja Sloth =

Danish dressage rider (born 1992)

Nadja Aaboe Sloth
Personal information
- Full name: Nadja Aaboe Sloth
- Born: 23 October 1992 (age 33)

Sport
- Country: Denmark
- Sport: Dressage
Medal record
Equestrian
Representing Denmark
World Championships
Bronze medal – third place	2026 Aachen	Team dressage
European Championships
Bronze medal – third place	2025 Crozet	Team dressage

Nadja Aaboe Sloth (born 23 October 1992) is a Danish dressage rider.

She competed at the 2025 European Championships where she won a bronze team medal and became 12th individually. Sloth was named as first traveling reserve for the Danish team at the 2024 Olympic Games in Paris.
