= Abigail Lyle =

Irish equestrian

Personal information
- Nationality: Irish
- Born: 22 April 1985 (age 41) Bangor, County Down, Northern Ireland

Sport
- Country: Ireland
- Sport: Equestrian
- Event: Dressage

Achievements and titles
- Olympicfinals: 2024 Olympic Games
- World finals: 2022 FEI World Equestrian Games

Abigail Lyle (born 22 April 1985 in Bangor, County Down, Northern Ireland) is an Irish dressage rider. She competed at the 2022 FEI World Equestrian Games representing the Irish team with her horse Giraldo. In 2023 she competed at the 2023 European Dressage Championships in Riesenbeck and is currently the highest ranked Irish dressage rider in the FEI World Dressage Ranking. Lyle is based in England, where she runs her stables.

Lyle represented Ireland at the 2024 Summer Olympics in Paris as an individual rider, finishing 37th.
