= Katharina Hemmer =

German dressage rider (born 1994)

Personal information
- Full name: Katharina Hemmer
- Born: 5 August 1994 (age 32) Erwitte, Germany

Sport
- Country: Germany
- Sport: Dressage
- Club: Fleyenhof
- Coached by: Hubertus Schmidt
Medal record
Equestrian
Representing Germany
World Championships
Gold medal – first place	2026 Aachen	Team dressage
Bronze medal – third place	2026 Aachen	Individual dressage
European Championships
Gold medal – first place	2025 Crozet	Team dressage

Katharina Hemmer (born 5 August 1994) is a German dressage rider. She competed at the 2025 European Championships where she won a golden team medal. Hemmer competed successfully from 2021 on international level and was selected to represent Germany at the European Championships after winning international competitions such as Hagen and Lier abroad Denoix PCH.

She is being trained and employed by German Olympian Hubertus Schmidt.
