= Charlotte Lenherr =

Swiss equestrian

Personal information
- Full name: Charlotte Lenherr
- Nationality: Switzerland
- Discipline: Dressage
- Born: December 29, 1970 (age 54)

Charlotte Lenherr (born December 29, 1970) is a Swiss dressage rider. She competed at three European Dressage Championships, including in 2017, 2019 and 2023. Lenherr was also part of the Swiss team during the 2022 FEI World Championships.

In 2021 and 2023 she became Swiss national champion.
