= Melissa Galloway =

New Zealand equestrian

Personal information
- Born: Melissa Parkes; 4 March 1993 Tuamarina, New Zealand
- Height: 165 cm (5 ft 5 in)

Sport
- Country: New Zealand
- Sport: Equestrian
- Event: Dressage

Achievements and titles
- Olympic finals: Paris 2024

Melissa Galloway (born 4 March 1993) is a New Zealand dressage rider. She represented New Zealand at the 2022 FEI World Championships in Herning, finishing 33rd. Galloway is the highest ranked dressage rider from New Zealand and won several Grand Prix Titles at the national championships. In 2022 she moved temporarily to The Netherlands to train with Danish Olympian Anne van Olst.

In 2024 she represented New Zealand at the 2024 Olympic Games in Paris, France, setting a record for New Zealand by achieving a result of 68.913% in the Grand Prix.
