= Becky Moody =

British dressage competitor

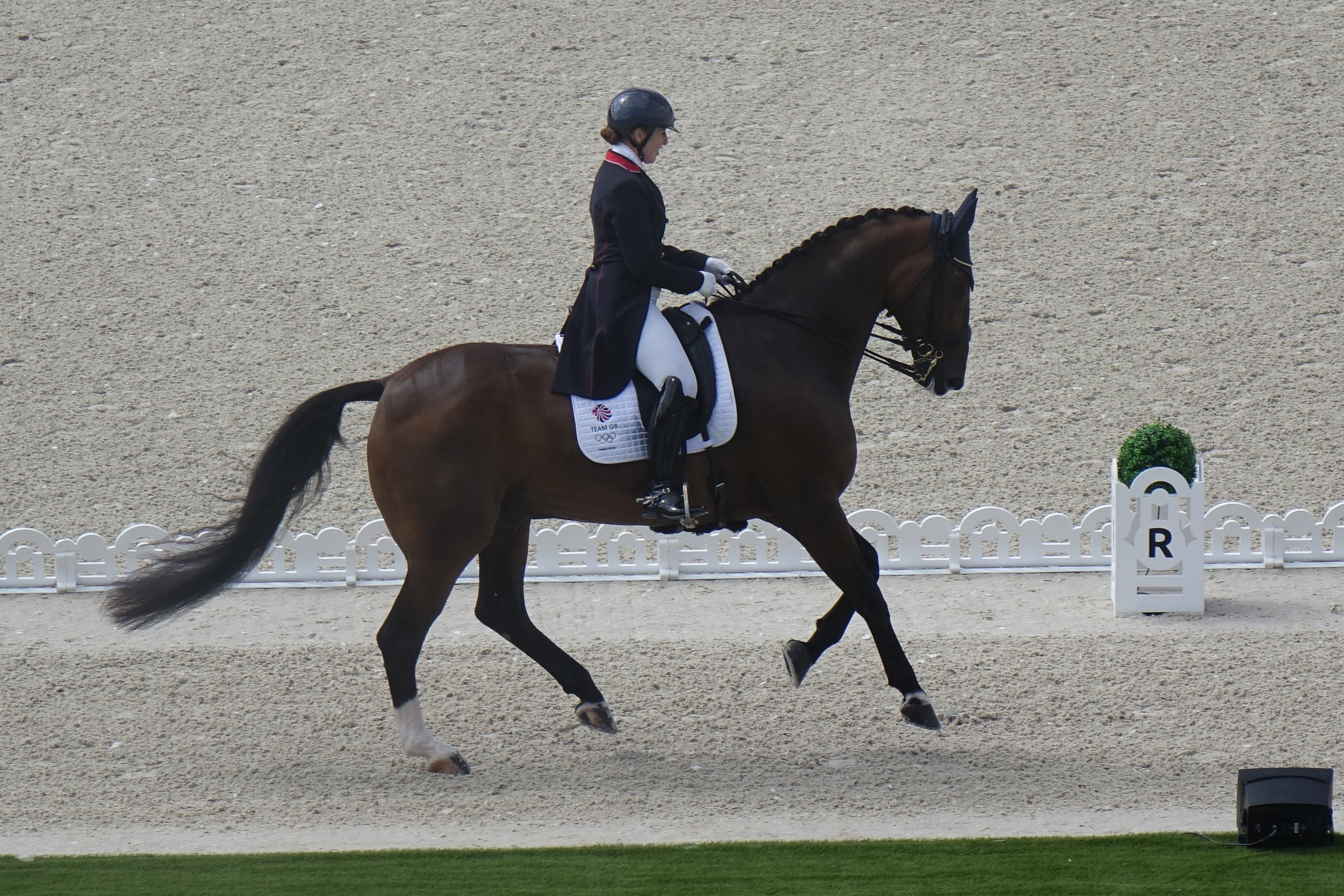
- Moody at the 2024 Olympic Games

Personal information
- Full name: Rebecca Moody
- Born: 16 March 1980 (age 46) Irvine, North Ayrshire, United Kingdom
- Occupations: Horse breeder, trainer and dressage competitor
- Website: moodydressage.co.uk
Medal record
Representing Great Britain
Olympic Games
Bronze medal – third place	2024 Paris	Team dressage
World Championships
Silver medal – second place	2026 Aachen	Team dressage
European Championships
Silver medal – second place	2025 Crozet	Team dressage
Dressage World Cup
Gold medal – first place	2026 Forth Worth	Individual dressage

Rebecca Moody (born 16 March 1980 in Irvine, North Ayrshire, United Kingdom) is a British horse breeder and dressage competitor based in Yorkshire. In 2024 she joined the British dressage team at short notice to win a bronze team medal at the 2024 Paris Olympics. As of January 2026, she is ranked second in the FEI Dressage World Ranking for Athletes CDI3*/CDIO3* and above.

== Early life ==
Becky Moody was born on 16 March 1980 in Irvine, North Ayrshire. She lived in Scotland until the family moved to the small hamlet of Gunthwaite, near Barnsley, when she was six. She has two elder sisters, Hannah and Sarah. When she was fourteen she was a keen member of the Rockwood Harriers which was a branch of the Pony Club. She and her horse Maximillian were identified as the British Pony Team's reserve in 1994. A year later she won the individual and team tests at Hickstead International with Hannah’s 15hh Highland x Thoroughbred, Sir Fred. She then went on to represent Great Britain at four U21 European Championships with Jordas and Kwadraat winning two team bronze medals. In 2000 and 2001, Becky was the highest placed Brit.

== Career ==
In 2015, she came of notice when she won the Dressage Future Elite winners at the Horse of the Year Show. Her eight year old gelding horse was Carinsio who belonged to Julie Lockey and he was the son of Painted Black. Carinsio was creating high scores and with Moody the horse scored over 77% despite some error.

Moody went on to achieve several victories in the grand prix Premier League. Carinsio achieved more despite some injuries before he was retired in 2021.

In March 2024, she and her horse Jagerbomb won the event at Addington organised by the International Federation for Equestrian Sports (FEI). She takes credit for the ten years it took to breed Jagerbomb who is named for the alcoholic drink and because her grandfather was known as "bomb".

In 2024, she went to the Paris Olympics as part of the British team and qualified for the finals. She was intended to the travelling reserve to the British dressage team of Charlotte Dujardin, Lottie Fry and Carl Hester. The team was named on 26 June 2024. Moody replaced Charlotte Dujardin after she pulled out after a video was published showing her whipping a horse during training . Andrew Gould was named as the new alternate. Individually she and Jagerbomb did well in the dressage performing to Tom Jones' You're a Sex Bomb - a tune she had initially rejected as "too cheesy". She came eighth with a personal best score of over 84%. She and the British team scored a combined 232.492% to win a bronze medal behind gold medallists Germany and silver medallists Denmark.

At the 2025 London International Horse Show, she placed 2nd in the FEI Dressage World Cup™ Freestyle to Music, with a high score of 86.41% set to a mix of festive soundtracks.

As of January 2026, she is ranked second in the FEI Dressage World Ranking for Athletes CDI3*/CDIO3* and above.

She and her elder sister Hannah Moody run Moody Dressage in South Yorkshire. She also writes a popular humorous blog for Jaegerbomb, about their mutual adventures.
