= João Pedro Moreira =

Portuguese dressage rider

Personal information
- Born: 4 September 1985 (age 40) Lisbon, Portugal

Sport
- Country: Portugal
- Sport: Equestrian
- Coached by: Kyra Kyrklund

Achievements and titles
- World finals: 2022 FEI World Championships

João Pedro Moreira (born 4 September 1985, Lisbon) is a dressage rider from Portugal. He competed at the 2022 FEI World Championships in Herning and the 2023 European Championships in Riesenbeck, finishing 18th in the individual final Freestyle. Moreira resides in Germany where he runs his equestrian business.
