= Corentin Pottier =

French dressage rider (born 1993)

Personal information
- Born: 22 September 1993 (age 33) Rueil-Malmaison, France

Sport
- Country: France
- Sport: Equestrian
- Club: Pamfou Dressage

Achievements and titles
- Olympic finals: Paris 2024
- World finals: Herning 2022

Corentin Pottier (born 22 September 1993, in Rueil-Malmaison, France) is a French dressage rider.

Pottier was part of the French dressage team at four European Championships from 2013 til 2016 in the Young Riders and U25 division. In 2018 his mount Gotilas Du Feuillard won the French Dressage Championships for 7-year olds in Le Mans, France.

In 2021, he and Gotilas Du Feuillard were named to the long list of prospective riders to represent France at the 2024 Summer Olympic Games in Paris.

In 2023 Pottier was part of the French team which won the Nations Cup Dressage in Rotterdam for the first time in history of French dressage. Later that year, he was left off of the French team for the 2023 European Dressage Championships in Riesenbeck, in a decision that was considered "surprising" considering his scores as a member of the French Nations Cup team. Pottier appealed the decision unsuccessfully twice.

In 2024 Pottier and Gotilas Du Feuillard won the Le Mans CDI4* Grand Prix. Two months later they were named to represent France at the 2024 Summer Olympic Games.

He runs a training and sales stable near Fontainebleau with his partner, dressage rider Camille Judet Cheret.
