= Cathrine Laudrup-Dufour =

Danish dressage rider (born 1992)

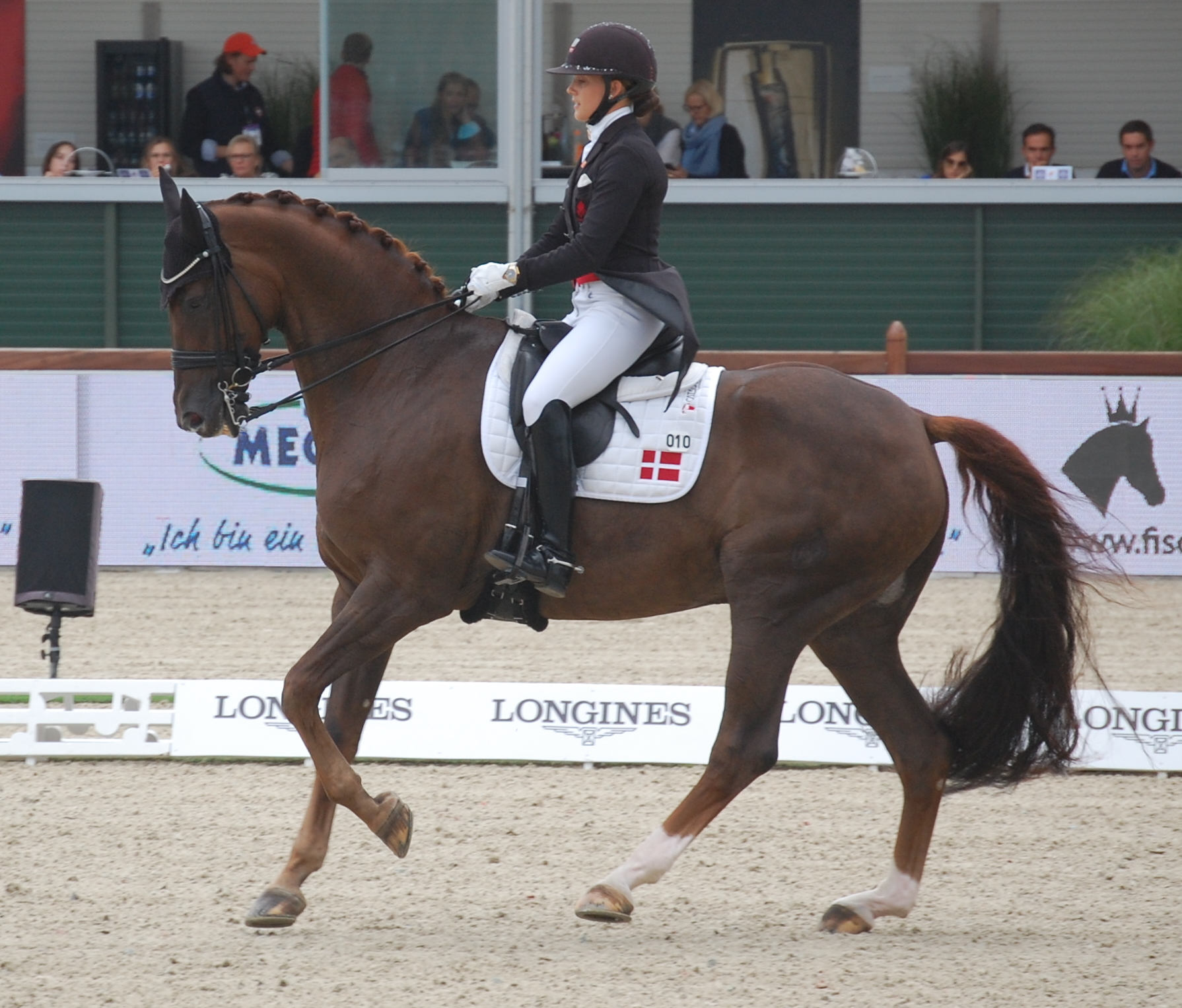
- Dufour and Bohemian (2021)

Personal information
- Nickname: Cat
- Born: 2 January 1992 (age 34) Hvalsø, Denmark
- Spouse: Rasmine Laudrup-Dufour (2023-) Kids: Palma Laudrup-Dufour

Sport
- Country: Denmark
- Sport: Equestrian dressage
- Coached by: Princess Nathalie of Sayn-Wittgenstein-Berleburg, Kyra Kyrklund

Achievements and titles
- Olympic finals: Rio de Janeiro 2016; Tokyo 2020; Paris 2024
- Highest world ranking: 1
Medal record
Equestrian
Representing Denmark
Olympic Games
Silver medal – second place	2024 Paris	Team dressage
World Championships
Gold medal – first place	2022 Herning	Team dressage
Silver medal – second place	2022 Herning	Individual special dressage
Silver medal – second place	2022 Herning	Individual freestyle dressage
Silver medal – second place	2026 Aachen	Individual special dressage
Silver medal – second place	2026 Aachen	Individual freestyle dressage
Bronze medal – third place	2026 Aachen	Team dressage
European Championships
Silver medal – second place	2017 Gothenburg	Team dressage
Silver medal – second place	2021 Hagen	Freestyle dressage
Silver medal – second place	2025 Crozet	Special dressage
Silver medal – second place	2025 Crozet	Freestyle dressage
Bronze medal – third place	2017 Gothenburg	Special dressage
Bronze medal – third place	2017 Gothenburg	Freestyle dressage
Bronze medal – third place	2019 Rotterdam	Special dressage
Bronze medal – third place	2021 Hagen	Team dressage
Bronze medal – third place	2021 Hagen	Special dressage
Bronze medal – third place	2025 Crozet	Team dressage
World Cup
Silver medal – second place	2022 Leipzig	Individual dressage

Cathrine Laudrup-Dufour (born 2 January 1992) is a Danish Olympic dressage horse rider. Representing Denmark, she competed at the 2016 Summer Olympics in Rio de Janeiro where she finished 13th in the individual and 6th in the team competition. At the 2020 Summer Olympics in Tokyo, she finished 4th in both the individual and team dressage events.

She also represented Denmark in the 2024 Olympic Games in Paris, riding the horse Freestyle. She won a silver team medal and placed 5th in the individual freestyle.

In March 2025 she was ranked first in the FEI Dressage World Rankings.

== Sports career ==
Dufour started riding at age 5 and joined the Danish national pony dressage team at age 12. She won several medals at the Danish and European junior and young riders championships.

She studied Leisure and Sports Management for a year at University College Zealand.

Personal Bests
	PB	Date	Horse
Grand Prix	84.174	06 March 2026	Mount St John Freestyle
Grand Prix Special	82.681	05 March 2020	Bohemian
Grand Prix Freestyle	91.140	19 February 2025	Mount St John Freestyle

== Olympics results ==
Year	Event	Result	Rank
2016	Individual dressage	78.143	13
2016	Team dressage	74.311	6
2020	Individual dressage	87.507	4
2020	Team dressage	7540.0	4
2024	Team dressage	235.669	2nd place, silver medalist(s)
2024	Individual dressage	88.093	5

== Business interests ==
While studying, Dufour started Cathrine Dressage, where she trains horses and young riders. She also develops training videos for the platform Cathrine Stream.

Dufour is a brand-ambassador for the Danish bag brand Adax and collaborates with other brands, including Trolle Company, Cavalleria Toscana and Ingdam's.

== Personal life ==
Dufour is married to Rasmine Laudrup, daughter of former professional footballer Brian Laudrup. They live on an equestrian estate in Fredensborg north of Copenhagen. Their daughter Palma Laudrup-Dufour was born on 31 May 2025.

== Horses ==
- Atterupgaards Cassidy
- Eternity
- ADAX'Sauterness
- Perfect Brilliant
- Vamos Amigos
- Bohemian
- Mount St John Freestyle
