= 2025 FEI European Dressage Championships =

Sports season

- Host city: Crozet, France
- Date(s): 26-31 August 2025
- Level: Senior
- Events: 3

The 2025 FEI European Dressage Championships were held in Crozet, France, from 26 to 31 August 2025. The European Championships were initially designated to Šamorín in Slovakia, but in August 2024 the FEI announced that Šamorín withdrew as host. The FEI opened the bidding process again and found a host in Crozet, in which the European Dressage Championships will be held for the first time in France. France hosted the 2014 World Equestrian Games in Caen and the European Championships in Show-Jumping in Paris in 1959, in Dinard in 1985 and in La Baule in 1991. The European Championships were held at the Jiva Hill Stables, which is close to Geneva on the French-Swiss border. The host is also known for their luxury resorts and organizes international dressage. competitions, including a 5* FEI recognized show in 2024.

== Competition format ==
The team and individual dressage competitions used the same results. Dressage had three phases. The first phase was the Grand Prix. Top 30 individuals advanced to the second phase, the Grand Prix Special where the first individual medals were awarded. The last set of medals at the 2025 European Dressage Championships was awarded after the third phase, the Grand Prix Freestyle where top 18 combinations competed. Only three riders per country are allowed to compete in the final Freestyle. If a country has four riders qualified for the Freestyle, only the best three are able to ride the Freestyle, and the remaining place(s) moves to the next combination(s) in line.

== Medals ==
=== Dressage ===
Event	Gold	Silver	Bronze
Freestyle dressage Details	Justin Verboomen on Zonik Plus; Belgium	Cathrine Laudrup-Dufour on Mount St John Freestyle; Denmark	Isabell Werth on Wendy de Fontaine; Germany
Special dressage Details	Justin Verboomen on Zonik Plus; Belgium	Cathrine Laudrup-Dufour on Mount St John Freestyle; Denmark	Isabell Werth on Wendy de Fontaine; Germany
Team	Germany; Ingrid Klimke on Vayron NRW; Katharina Hemmer on Denoix PCH; Frederic Wandres on Bluetooth OLD; Isabell Werth on Wendy de Fontaine	(United Kingdom) Great Britain; Andrew Gould on Indigro; Becky Moody on Jagerbomb; Carl Hester on Fame; Charlotte Fry on Glamourdale	Denmark; Nadja Aaboe Sloth on Favour Gersdorf; Rikke Dupont on Grand Galiano; Andreas Helgstrand on Jovian; Cathrine Laudrup-Dufour on Mount St John Freestyle
