= Marieke van der Putten =

Dutch dressage rider (born 1982)

Personal information
- Full name: Marieke van der Putten
- Nationality: Dutch
- Born: 27 November 1982 (age 43) Heemskerk, Netherlands

Sport
- Country: Netherlands
- Sport: Equestrian

Achievements and titles
- World finals: 2022 FEI World Championships

Marieke van der Putten (born 27 November 1982 in Heemskerk, Netherlands) is a Dutch dressage rider. She competed at the 2022 FEI World Championships in Herning, where she placed 31st in the individual dressage competition, and 5th with the Dutch team. In 2023 Van der Putten competed in the World Cup Finals in Omaha, Nebraska, finishing 8th in the Grand Prix. Van der Putten competed at several World Championships for Young Dressage Horses and World Cup qualifiers.

Van der Putten has been the assistant rider of Dutch Olympians Edward Gal and Hans-Peter Minderhoud at the Glock Horse Performance Center. In 2017, she decided to go independent en started riding at RS2 Dressage in Goesbeek.
