= Andrew Gould (equestrian) =

British dressage rider (born 1980)

Personal information
- Full name: Andrew Gould
- Born: 21 May 1980 (age 46) London, United Kingdom

Sport
- Country: United Kingdom
- Sport: Dressage
Medal record
Equestrian
Representing United Kingdom
European Championships
Silver medal – second place	2025 Crozet	Team dressage

Andrew Gould (born 21 May 1980) is a British dressage rider. He competed at the 2025 European Championships where he won a silver team medal. He was also the first traveling reserve for the British dressage team during the 2024 Olympic Games in Paris.

He runs his own equestrian business in West Sussex, England.
