= Marcus Orlob =

US equestrian

Personal information
- Nationality: American, German
- Born: March 16, 1982 (age 44) Düsseldorf, Germany

Sport
- Country: United States
- Sport: Equestrian
- Event: Dressage

Marcus Orlob (/ˈɔːrlɒb/ OR-lob; born March 16, 1982 in Düsseldorf, Germany) is an American dressage rider. Orlob is a professional rider and trainer and has completed the German Riding School in Warendorf, Germany, where he received the 'Bereiter' title. Later, he moved to the US where he located himself in Florida to run his stable.

The US Equestrian Federation selected Orlob to represent the American team at the 2024 Summer Olympics in Paris. During his Grand Prix test at the Olympics, blood became visible on his horse Jane's leg and he was disqualified.
