= Aleksandra Szulc =

Polish dressage rider (born 1987)

Personal information
- Born: 1 May 1987 (age 39) Łódź, Poland

Sport
- Country: Poland
- Sport: Equestrian
- Event: Dressage

Achievements and titles
- Olympic finals: 2024 Olympic Games

Aleksandra Szulc (born 1 May 1987) is a Polish dressage rider. She represented Poland at the 2017 FEI European Championships and at the 2022 FEI World Championships.

Szulc represented the Polish team at the 2024 Olympic Games in Paris. Initially, she was appointed as first reserve but the horse Love Me of Żaneta Skowrońska was not fit to compete which resulted in a team spot for Szulc.
