= Justin Verboomen =

Belgian equestrian (born 1987)

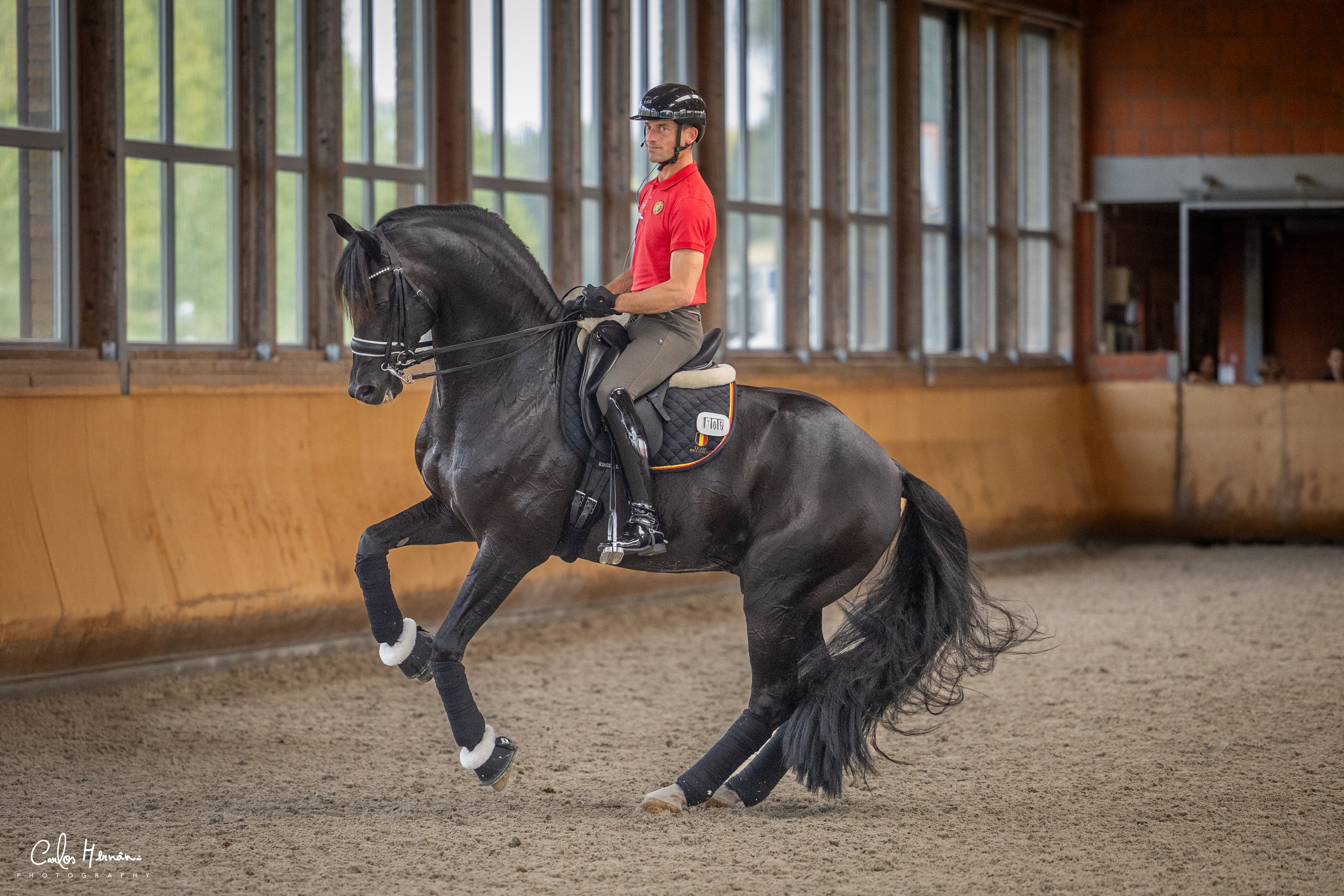
- Verboomen and Zonik Plus in 2025

Personal information
- Born: 24 July 1987 (age 39) Anderlecht, Belgium

Sport
- Country: Belgium
- Sport: Equestrian
Medal record
Equestrian
Representing Belgium
European Championships
Gold medal – first place	2025 Crozet	Special dressage
Gold medal – first place	2025 Crozet	Freestyle dressage

Justin Verboomen (born 24 July 1987) is a Belgian dressage rider. He made history for Belgium by winning the first ever medals for Belgium at a major senior dressage championship, whether in team or individual competition, winning the gold in both the Grand Prix Special and the Freestyle dressage at the 2025 FEI European Dressage Championships in Crozet, France, with his exceptional stallion Zonik Plus.

Verboomen, the son of a horse riding instructor and a general practitioner, worked for around ten years at a stable of Lusitano horses for dressage in Portugal owned by Léopold Gombeer, former director of the “Académie belge d’équitation”. While there, he made his first attempts at competition dressage participating in the “Masters Du Cheval Ibérique”, the only European dressage league and championship specifically for Iberian horses. When the stable ended its activities, Verboomen returned to Belgium and started his own stable, Ecurie B, in Wauthier-Braine.

Verboomen's fortunes changed after acquiring the then two-year old Hanoverian stallion Zonik Plus at the Dressage Plus, a stud farm known for Lusitanos, warmbloods and crossbreeds in Portugal. The two clicked and success came quickly: sixth in the world championship for six-year-old horses and the Belgian champion titles for five-, six- and seven-year-olds between 2021 and 2023. Verboomen showed patience, waiting for the stallion eight birthday before entering the duo at the highest level of modern competition, the Grand Prix.

The duo took the Dressage world by storm: debuted in late November 2024, Verboomen won the Grand Prix at the CDI-W in Malines, Belgium, his first ever appearance on the World Cup circuit. This was quickly followed by wins in both Grand Prix and Freestyle CDI4* in March in Lier, Belgium, and third places in both Grand Prix and Freestyle at the Dutch Masters CDI-W in 's-Hertogenbosch, The Netherlands.

Barely nine months after their debut on the international stage, Justin Verboomen and Zonik Plus ranked inside the top five of the FEI Dressage World Rankings. In July 2025 Verboomen won both Grand Prix Special and Freestyle at the CDI5* event at the prestigious CDIO Aachen.

Verboomen is not just the rider of Zonik Plus but also his owner. Zonik competes in the Grand Prix without horseshoe.

In August 2025, Verboomen crowned his stellar debut season at the highest level by becoming a European Champion for the first time winning the gold in both the Grand Prix Special and Freestyle at the 2025 FEI European Dressage Championships in Crozet, France, with Zonik Plus. Verboomen was the first male rider since 2017 on a senior individual championship podium (Sönke Rothenberger at the 2017 FEI European Championships in Gothenburg) and the first male rider winning an individual gold at such championship since Edward Gal on Totilas won at the 2010 FEI World Equestrian Games.

After the double win at the 2025 FEI European Dressage Championships, Verboomen, not a year after his debut on the highest stage of the competition, rose to become the new world number 1 in the FEI ranking for dressage riders for the first time in his career while his championship hores "Zonik Plus" also rose to the top of the FEI rankings for dressage horses.

Verboomen continued his 2025 winning streak by winning both the Grand Prix, setting a new personal best of 81.195%, and the Free Style competitions at the second leg of the FEI Dressage World Cup™ 2025/2026 Western European League in Lyon, France.

Having delivered a career-defining season, capturing double gold at the FEI Dressage European Championship in Crozet (FRA) and reaching the top of the FEI Dressage World Ranking in 2025, Verboomen was chosen as the 2025 FEI Best Athlete, the first such awarded won by a Belgian rider, male or female.

Verboomen ended 2025 winning both the Grand Prix and Grand Prix Freestyle at the Frankfurt World's Best 12 special CDI5* event, posting his first ever score above 90% in the Freestyle.

== Personal bests ==
Test	Date	Event	Horse	Score
Grand Prix	18 April 2026	2026 CDIO Fontainebleau	Zonik Plus	83.500
Grand Prix Special	26 August 2025	2025 FEI European Dressage Championships	Zonik Plus	82.371
Grand Prix Freestyle	19 April 2026	2026 CDIO Fontainebleau	Zonik Plus	91.855
