= Joanna Robinson =

Finnish dressage rider (born 1989)

Personal information
- Born: 1 April 1989 (age 37) Helsinki, Finland

Sport
- Country: Finland
- Sport: Equestrian
- Event: Dressage

Achievements and titles
- Olympic finals: 2024 Olympic Games

Joanna Robinson (born 1 April 1989 in Helsinki, Finland) is a Finnish Olympic dressage rider.

Robinson represented the Finnish team at the 2024 Olympic Games in Paris. With the Finnish team they finished 7th in the team competition, which is the best team result for the Finnish dressage team in history.

== Personal life ==
As of 2024, Robinson lives in Riel, Netherlands, with her British husband. She has previously also lived in Spain and the United Kingdom.
