= Sandra Sysojeva =

Polish equestrian

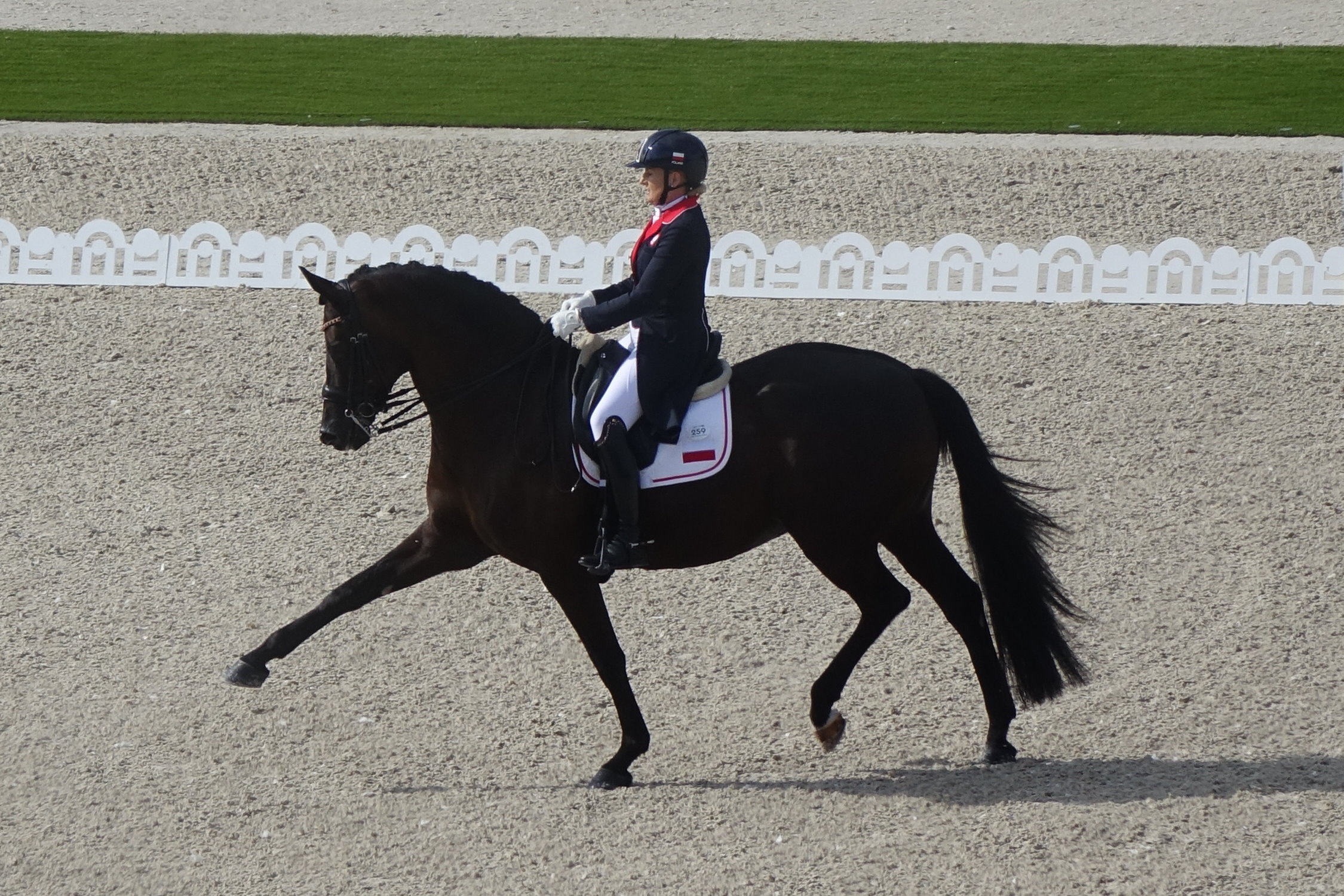
- Sysojeva at the 2024 Olympic Games

Personal information
- Nationality: Polish
- Born: 8 November 1983 (age 42) Vilnius, Lithuania

Sport
- Country: Poland
- Sport: Equestrian
- Event: Dressage

Achievements and titles
- Olympic finals: 2024 Olympic Games
Medal record
Equestrian
Representing Poland
Dressage World Cup
Bronze medal – third place	2026 Fort Worth	Individual dressage

Sandra Sysojeva (born 8 November 1983, in Vilnius, Lithuania) is a Lithuanian-born Polish equestrian. Sysojeva competed under the Lithuanian flag until 2023, and switched nationality in 2024, to be able to compete at the Olympic Games.

Sysojeva represented the Polish dressage team at the 2024 Summer Olympics in Paris, which was her first Olympic appearance. She made it to the individual final, finishing 15th in the Grand Prix Freestyle with the highest result ever for a Polish dressage rider, scoring 80.075%.

Sysojeva was the first Polish dressage rider making it to the podium in the history of the Dressage World Cup Finals, winning bronze at the 2026 World Cup Finals in Fort Worth.
