= Isabel Freese =

Norwegian dressage rider

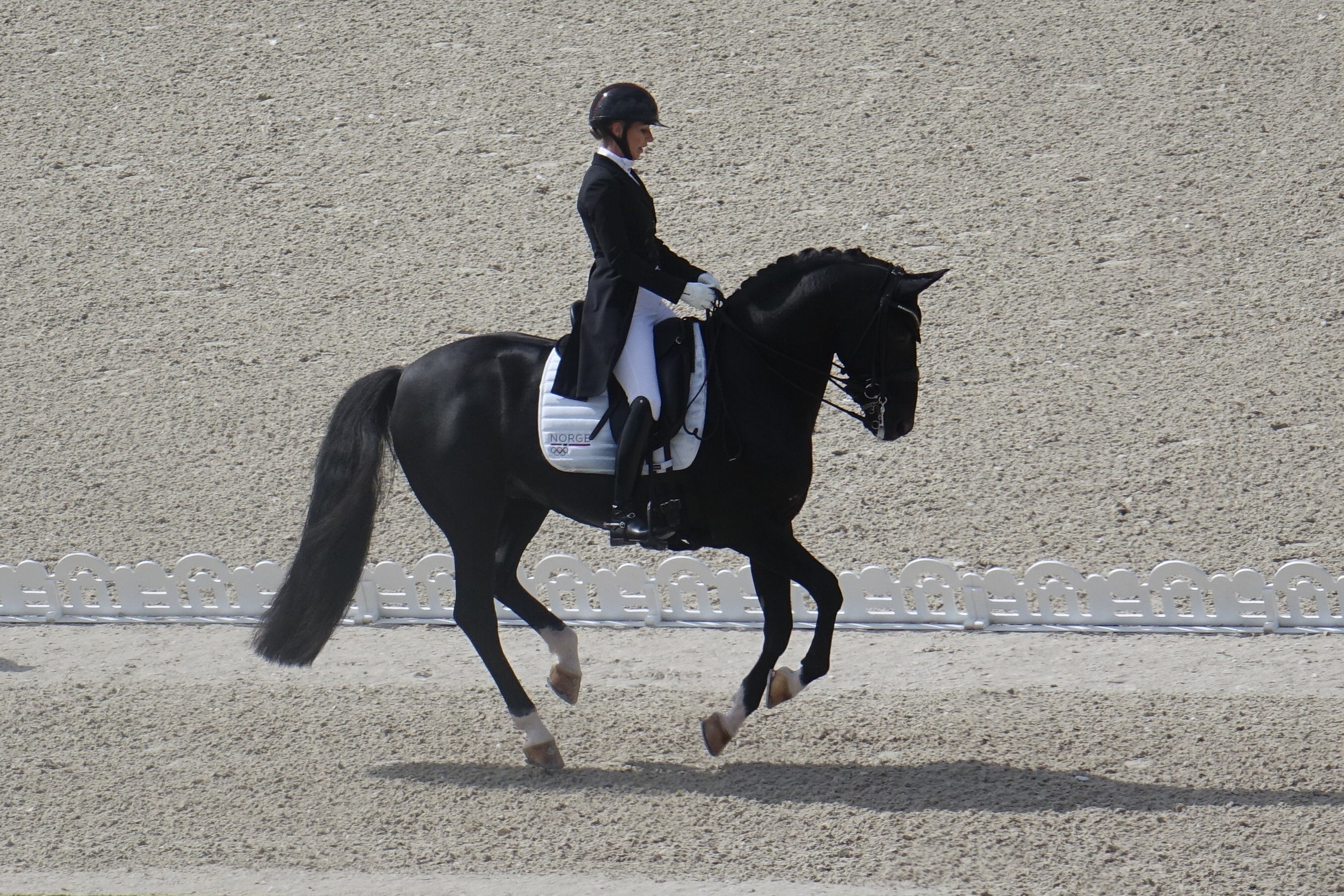
- Freese at the 2024 Olympic Games

Personal information
- Nationality: Norwegian, German
- Born: Isabel Bache; 19 January 1979 (age 47) Oslo, Norway

Sport
- Country: Norway
- Sport: Equestrian
- Coached by: Holga Finken

Achievements and titles
- Olympic finals: 2024 Olympic Games
- World finals: 2022 FEI World Championships
Medal record
Equestrian
Representing Norway
World Cup Finals
Bronze medal – third place	2025 Basel	Individual dressage
World Championships for Young Dressage Horses
Bronze medal – third place	2018 Ermelo	Individual dressage
Bronze medal – third place	2019 Ermelo	Individual dressage

Isabel Freese (born 19 January 1979) is a Norwegian dressage rider. She competed at the 2022 FEI World Championships in Herning as individual and also competed at the 2013 and 2017 European Championships. Freese competed at several World Championships for Young Dressage Horses in which she won a bronze medal in 2018 and 2019.

Freese started riding at the age of six in her hometown Oslo. At the age of 20 she moved to Germany to pursue her equestrian career. Freese was nominated by the Norwegian Equestrian Federation to represent Norway as individual at the 2024 Olympic Games in Paris. She made it to the individual final, finishing 10th in the individual Freestyle with a personal best and Norwegian record of 83.050%, which is also the best result in history for a Norwegian dressage rider at the Olympics.
