= Thamar Zweistra =

Dutch dressage rider (born 1982)

Personal information
- Full name: Thamar Zweistra
- Nationality: Dutch
- Born: 3 December 1982 (age 43) Dordrecht, Netherlands

Sport
- Country: Netherlands
- Sport: Equestrian
- Coached by: Leunus van Lieren

Achievements and titles
- World finals: 2022 FEI World Championships

Thamar Zweistra (born 3 December 1982 in Dordrecht, Netherlands) is a Dutch dressage rider. She competed at the 2022 FEI World Championships in Herning, where she placed 20th in the individual dressage competition, and 5th with the Dutch team. In 2022 Zweistra also competed in the World Cup Finals in Leipzig, finishing 11th in the individual ranking. She was also on the longlist for the 2020 Olympic Games in Tokyo.

Zweistra was very successful as a young rider and represented The Netherlands at both the Junior and Young Riders European championships, where she won several team medals.
