= Frederic Wandres =

German dressage rider

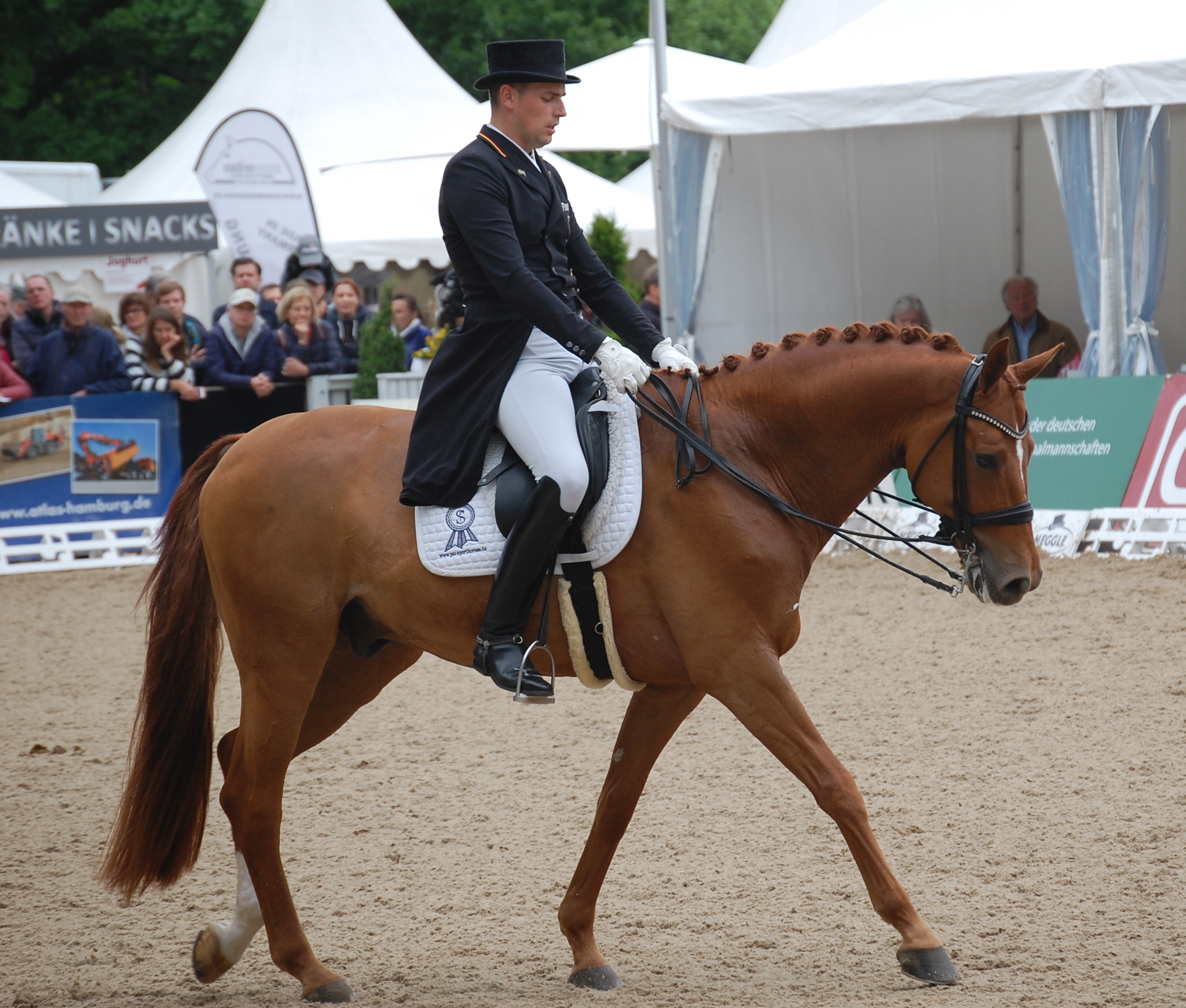
- Wandres in 2019

Personal information
- Full name: Frederic Wandres
- Nationality: German
- Born: 25 March 1987 (age 39) Kehl, Germany

Sport
- Country: Germany
- Sport: Equestrian
- Club: Hof Kasselmann
- Coached by: Jonny Hilberath

Achievements and titles
- World finals: 2022 FEI World Championships
Medal record
Equestrian
Representing Germany
Olympic Games
Gold medal – first place	2024 Paris	Team dressage
World Championships
Gold medal – first place	2026 Aachen	Team dressage
Bronze medal – third place	2022 Herning	Team dressage
European Championships
Silver medal – second place	2023 Riesenbeck	Team dressage

Frederic Wandres (born 25 March 1987 in Kehl, Germany) is a German dressage rider. He competed at the 2022 FEI World Championships in Herning, where he won a Bronze team medal with the German team. Wandres competed at several World Championships for Young Dressage Horses in which he won a gold medal in 2019. He was also on the longlist for the 2020 Olympic Games in Tokyo for the German team.

He started as student rider at Hof Kasselmann in 2007, and became later stable rider. He educated and competed several young horses up to Grand Prix. Wandres is openly gay.

At the 2024 Olympic Games he was part of the German dressage team that won team gold. He finished 13th in the individual final.
