= 2026 FEI World Championships =

Equestrian games

FEI World Championships Aachen 2026
- Host city: Aachen, Germany
- Events: 6 disciplines
- Opening: 11 August
- Closing: 23 August
- Website: Aachen 2026

The FEI World Championships Aachen 2026 was held in Aachen, Germany, from 11 to 23 August 2026. It was the tenth edition of the Games, which are held every four years and run by the International Federation for Equestrian Sports (FEI). For team events in the dressage, show jumping and eventing disciplines, these Games are the first qualifying event for the 2028 Summer Olympics. Aachen previously hosted the 2006 FEI World Equestrian Games.

== Bidding process ==
The FEI opened the bidding process of the 2026 World Championships October 2022 after the completion of the 2022 FEI World Championships in Herning and concluded the process in June 2023. In total there were five candidates interested in hosting the eventing, while only Aachen launched an official bid for six FEI disciplines including Show-Jumping, Dressage and Para-Dressage, Eventing, Driving Four-In-Hand and Vaulting. The other bids came from Boekelo, Netherlands for Eventing, Burghley, United Kingdom for Eventing, al-Ula, Saudi Arabia and Šamorín, Slovakia both for the FEI World Championships Endurance.

During the Board meeting in November 2023 during the FEI General Assembly in Mexico City, the FEI allocated the 2026 FEI World Championships for the six disciplines to Aachen, who hosted the same FEI World Equestrian Games in 2006 as well. The FEI World Championships for Endurance was allocated to al-Ula.

== Venues and disciplines ==
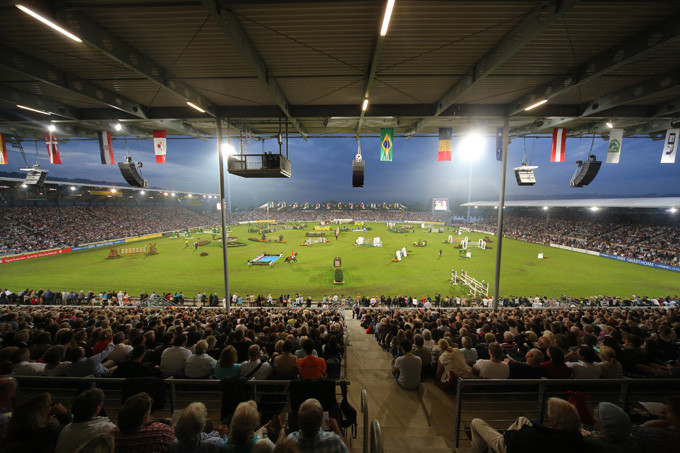
The main stadium

Competition venues at the Soers in Aachen hosted the following disciplines:

- Main Stadium – Jumping, Dressage, Eventing (Jumping Test), Side Events
- Stadium 2 – Driving, Eventing (Dressage Test)
- Stadium 3 – Para-equestrian, Vaulting
- Cross-Country Course Soers – Eventing (Cross-Country Test)

== Participating nations ==
66 nations are scheduled to take part.

- Argentina (11)
- Australia (28)
- Austria (35)
- Belgium (30)
- Brazil (24)
- Canada (21)
- China (1)
- Colombia (4)
- Croatia (1)
- Cyprus (2)
- Czech Republic (12)
- Denmark (23)
- Dominican Republic (2)
- Ecuador (1)
- Egypt (5)
- Finland (16)
- France (33)
- Germany (41)
- (United Kingdom) Great Britain (18)
- Greece (2)
- Hong Kong (4)
- Hungary (22)
- Indonesia (1)
- India (2)
- Iran (1)
- (Republic of Ireland) Ireland (18)
- Israel (6)
- Italy (23)
- Jamaica (1)
- Japan (11)
- Jordan (2)
- Kyrgyzstan (1)
- Kuwait (1)
- Latvia (3)
- Lebanon (1)
- Liechtenstein (1)
- Lithuania (2)
- Luxembourg (2)
- Mexico (7)
- Morocco (4)
- Monaco (2)
- Netherlands (34)
- North Macedonia (1)
- New Zealand (10)
- Norway (10)
- Palestine (2)
- Poland (24)
- Portugal (10)
- Qatar (2)
- Romania (1)
- (Authorised Neutral Athletes) Neutral Individual (3)
- Saudi Arabia (5)
- Singapore (4)
- Slovakia (6)
- Slovenia (1)
- South Africa (6)
- Spain (17)
- Sweden (27)
- Switzerland (35)
- Thailand (5)
- Turkey (6)
- United Arab Emirates (4)
- United States (36)
- Uruguay (3)
- Uzbekistan (2)
- Zimbabwe (1)

== Medal summary ==
=== Medalists ===
Event	Gold	Silver	Bronze
Individual special dressage	Great Britain; Charlotte Fry on Glamourdale	Denmark; Cathrine Laudrup-Dufour on Mount St. John Freestyle	Germany; Katharina Hemmer on Denoix PCH
Individual freestyle dressage	Great Britain; Charlotte Fry on Glamourdale	Denmark; Cathrine Laudrup-Dufour on Mount St. John Freestyle	Germany; Isabell Werth on Wendy de Fontaine
Team dressage	Germany; Isabell Werth on Wendy de Fontaine; Frederic Wandres on Bluetooth OLD; Katharina Hemmer on Denoix PCH; Raphael Netz on Great Escape Camelot	Great Britain; Carl Hester on Fame; Becky Moody on Jägerbomb; Charlotte Fry on Glamourdale; Fiona Bigwood on Donna Bella	Denmark; Cathrine Laudrup-Dufour on Mount St. John Freestyle; Carina Cassøe Krüth on Heiline's Danciera; Nadja Aaboe Sloth on Favour Gersdorf; Daniel Bachmann Andersen on Flash Gordon 37
Individual jumping	Switzerland; Steve Guerdat on Dynamix de Belheme	Belgium; Thibeau Spits on Impress-K van't Kattenheye Z	Great Britain; Harry Charles on LT Holst Freda
Team jumping	Germany; Marcus Ehning on Coolio 42; Sophie Hinners on Iron Dames Singclair; Richard Vogel on United Touch S Daniel Deusser on Otello de Guldenboom	Belgium; Nicola Philippaerts on Katanga v/h Dingeshof; Pieter Devos on Casual DV Z Thibeau Spits on Impress-K van't Kattenheye Z Abdel Saïd on Wathnan Quaker Brimbelles Z	Great Britain; Ben Maher on Point Break; Harry Charles on LT Holst Freda; Adrian Whiteway on Chacco Volo; Scott Brash on Hello Mango
Individual eventing	Germany; Michael Jung on fischerChipmunk FRH	Great Britain; Rosalind Canter on Lordships Graffalo	Great Britain; Laura Collett on London 52
Team eventing	Great Britain; Rosalind Canter on Lordships Graffalo; Laura Collett on London 52; Tom McEwen on JL Dublin; Gemma Stevens on Flash Cooley	Germany; Michael Jung on fischerChipmunk FRH; Libussa Lübbeke on Caramia FRH; Malin Hansen-Hotopp on Carlitos Quidditch K Julia Krajewski on Uelzener's Nickel	United States; William Coleman on Diabolo; Caroline Pamukcu on HSH Blake; Boyd Martin on Cooley Nutcracker; Phillip Dutton on Denim
Individual driving	Australia; Boyd Exell	Belgium; Dries Degrieck	United States; Chester Weber
Team driving	Netherlands; Bram Chardon; Ijsbrand Chardon; Koos de Ronde	Australia; Boyd Exell; Tor van den Berge	Belgium; Dries Degrieck; Glenn Geerts; Tom Stokmans
Men's vaulting	France; Quentin Jabet on Estado Ifce	Netherlands; Sam dos Santos on Hero	Germany; Bela Lehnen on Max
Women's vaulting	Germany; Alice Layher on FBW Candy	Germany; Kathrin Meyer on Capitain Claus Old	Germany; Annemie Szemes on Rubinio 71
Pas de Deux	France; Theo Gardies & Noely Thibaudat on Sir Sensation	Italy; Rebecca Greggio & Davide Zanella on Malleret Romulus TS	Germany; Jannik Heiland & Kimberly Hyks on Crashkurs
Squad vaulting	Germany; Gianna Ronca, Philip Goroncy, Larina Herpertz, Yara Jolie Scheel, Fabio Ring, Bela Lehnen on Ecuador NRW	France; Dorian Terrier, Tom Menand, Jeanne Braun, Ruben Delaunay, Lambert Le Clezio, Quentin Jabet on Furst Fridolin HDC	Austria; Georg Gabl, Lena Bachbauer, Sarah Gollubics, Eva Nagiller, Sophie Pittl, Dominik Eder on Broadway NH
Team vaulting	Germany	France	Italy
Individual para-dressage championship test grade I	United States; Marie Vonderheyden on Fan Tastico H	Great Britain; Mari Durward-Akhurst on Athene Lindebjerg	Italy; Sara Morganti on Bond Girl 18
Individual para-dressage championship test grade II	Germany; Heidemarie Dresing on Poesie 143	Denmark; Katrine Kristensen on Goerklintgaards Quater	Great Britain; Jemima Green on Fantabulous
Individual para-dressage championship test grade III	Netherlands; Rixt van der Horst on Eisma's Royal Fonq N.O.P.	Denmark; Tobias Thorning Jørgensen on Blue Hors Zackorado	Italy; Francesca Salvadè on Escari
Individual para-dressage championship test grade IV	United States; Kate Shoemaker on Vianne	Germany; Anna-Lena Niehues on Vive l'Amour	Great Britain; Nicola Naylor on Humberto L
Individual para-dressage championship test grade V	Great Britain; Sophie Wells on MSJ Gold Standard	Netherlands; Britney de Jong on Caramba N.O.P.	Germany; Regine Mispelkamp on Highlander Delight's
Individual para-dressage freestyle test grade I	United States; Marie Vonderheyden on Fan Tastico H	Italy; Sara Morganti on Bond Girl 18	Latvia; Rihards Snikus on Rise and Shine
Individual para-dressage freestyle test grade II	United States; Fiona Howard on Diamond Dunes	Great Britain; Jemima Green on Fantabulous	Germany; Heidemarie Dresing on Poesie 143
Individual para-dressage freestyle test grade III	Netherlands; Rixt van der Horst on Eisma's Royal Fonq N.O.P.	Denmark; Tobias Thorning Jørgensen on Blue Hors Zackorado	Italy; Francesca Salvadè on Escari
Individual para-dressage freestyle test grade IV	United States; Kate Shoemaker on Vianne	France; Alexia Pittier on Sultan 768	Germany; Helen Brandt on Vulkan Vegas IB
Individual para-dressage freestyle test grade V	Sweden; Lena Malmström on Fabulous Fidelie	Germany; Regine Mispelkamp on Highlander Delight's	Netherlands; Britney de Jong on Caramba N.O.P.
Team para-dressage	United States; Marie Vonderheyden on Fan Tastico H Kate Shoemaker on Vianne; Fiona Howard on Diamond Dunes; Rebecca Hart on Floratina	Germany; Regine Mispelkamp on Highlander Delight's; Anna-Lena Niehues on Vive l'Amour; Heidemarie Dresing on Poesie 143; Helen Brandt on Vulkan Vegas IB	Netherlands; Rixt van der Horst on Eisma's Royal Fonq N.O.P. Britney de Jong on Caramba N.O.P. Tessa Baaijens-Van De Vrie on Happy Grace; Annemarieke Nobel on Doo Schufro

== Medal table ==
* Host nation (Germany)

Rank	Nation	Gold	Silver	Bronze	Total
1	Germany*	7	5	8	20
2	United States	6	0	2	8
3	Great Britain	4	4	5	13
4	Netherlands	3	2	2	7
5	France	2	3	0	5
6	Australia	1	1	0	2
7	Sweden	1	0	0	1
7	Switzerland	1	0	0	1
9	Denmark	0	5	1	6
10	Belgium	0	3	1	4
11	Italy	0	2	4	6
12	Austria	0	0	1	1
12	Latvia	0	0	1	1
Totals (13 entries)		25	25	25	75
