= Pauline Basquin =

French dressage rider

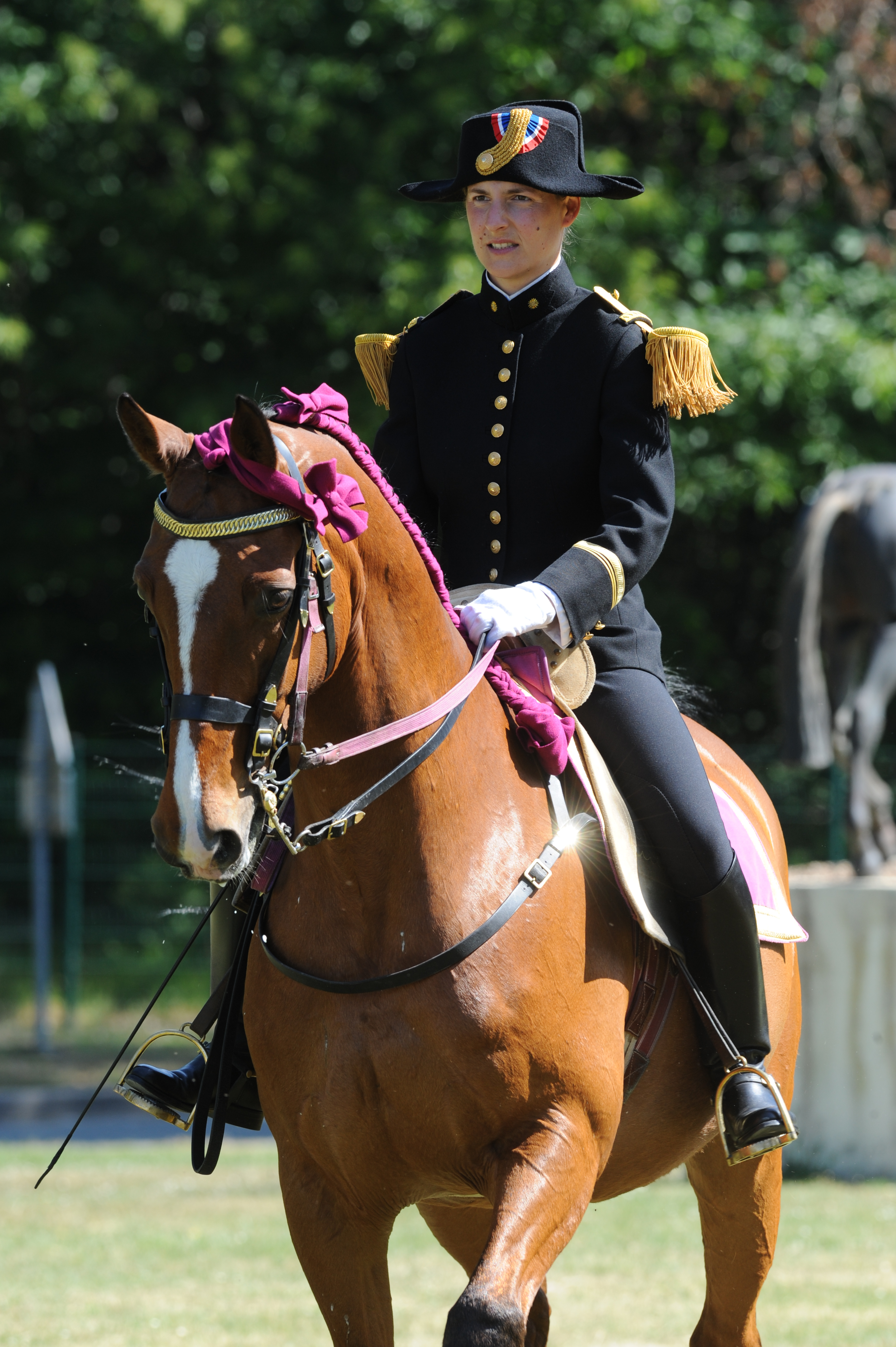
- Basquin at the Cadre Noir in 2011

Personal information
- Born: Pauline Vanlandeghem; 9 December 1978 (age 47) Rennes, France

Sport
- Country: France
- Sport: Equestrian
- Event: Dressage

Achievements and titles
- Olympic finals: Paris 2024
- World finals: 2022 FEI World Championships

Pauline Basquin (born 9 December 1978) is a French Dressage rider. She competed at the 2022 FEI World Championships in Herning and at the 2023 FEI European Dressage Championships, finishing 13th in the finals. Basquin was also part of the winning team at the FEI Nations Cup Dressage in Rotterdam in 2023, which was eventually the first Nations Cup victory in dressage for the French team. She represented the French team at the 2024 Olympic Games, finishing 6th in the team competition and 16th in the individual freestyle.

Pauline Basquin is a rider at the Cadre Noir in Saumur.
