= Larissa Pauluis =

Belgian dressage rider (born 1980)

Personal information
- Full name: Larissa Pauluis
- Nationality: Belgian
- Born: 22 February 1980 (age 46)

Sport
- Country: Belgium
- Sport: Dressage

Achievements and titles
- Olympic finals: 2020 Summer Olympics

Larissa Pauluis (born 22 February 1980) is a Belgian Olympic dressage rider. She competed at two World Championships for Young Dressage Horses and competed at the Olympic Games in Tokyo, representing Belgium.

== Equestrian career ==
Pauluis started riding at a young age and became Belgium National Champion in the pony class in 1996 and in 1997 in the juniors division. In 1998 she competed at the European Championships for Juniors in Hickstead. She trained several horses up to Grand Prix and competed at the World Championships for Young Dressage Horses in 2017 and 2019. Her international break-through came in 2021 by competing two horses on the highest level in Dressage. She competed at the Olympic Games, finished 42nd individually. For the first time since 1928 Belgium was represented by a dressage team at the Olympic Games.
