= Individual dressage at the 2017 European Dressage Championships =

The individual dressage at the 2017 FEI European Championships in Gothenburg, Sweden was held at Ullevi from 19 to 25 August.

Germany's Isabell Werth won the gold medal in both Grand Prix Special and Grand Prix Freestyle. Sönke Rothenberger representing Germany won a silver medal in both Grand Prix Freestyle and Grand Prix Special. Cathrine Dufour of Denmark won a bronze in special and in the Freestyle as well. In the Grand Prix Germany won the golden team medal, while Denmark won the silver medal and Sweden bronze.

== Competition format ==
The team and individual dressage competitions used the same results. Dressage had three phases. The first phase was the Grand Prix. Top 30 individuals advanced to the second phase, the Grand Prix Special where the first individual medals were awarded. The last set of medals at the 2019 European Dressage Championships was awarded after the third phase, the Grand Prix Freestyle where top 15 combinations competed, with a maximum of the three best riders per country. Two riders were ranked in the top 15, but because there were three other riders with a higher rank, they weren't able to compete in the Freestyle.

== Judges ==
The following judges were appointed to officiate during the European Dressage Championships.

- (Sweden) Annette Fransen Iacobaeus (Ground Jury President)
- (Germany) Evi Eisenhardt (Ground Jury Member)
- (United States) Anne Gribbons (Ground Jury Member)
- (United Kingdom) Isobel Wessels (Ground Jury Member)
- (Denmark) Hans-Christian Matthiesen (Ground Jury Member)
- (Netherlands) Francis Verbeek- van Rooy (Ground Jury Member)
- (Australia) Susan Hoevenaars (Ground Jury Member)
- (Belgium) Mariëtte Withages-Dieltjens (Technical Delegate)

== Schedule ==
All times are Central European Summer Time (UTC+2)

Date	Time	Round
Tuesday, 22 August 2017	15:00	Grand Prix (Day 1)
Wednesday, 23 August 2017	15:00	Grand Prix (Day 2)
Friday, 25 August 2017	11:45	Grand Prix Special
Saturday, 26 August 2017	14:30	Grand Prix Freestyle

== Results ==
Rider	Nation	Horse	GP score	Rank	GPS score	Rank	GPF score	Rank
Isabell Werth	Germany	Weihegold OLD	83.743	1 Q	83.613	(gold) Q	90.982	1st place, gold medalist(s)
Sönke Rothenberger	Germany	Cosmo	78.343	2 Q	82.479	(silver) Q	90.614	2nd place, silver medalist(s)
Cathrine Dufour	Denmark	Atterupsgaard Cassidy	78.300	3 Q	79.762	(bronze) Q	84.561	3rd place, bronze medalist(s)
Helen Langehanenberg	Germany	Damsey FRH	74.986	4 Q	70.756	21		
Carl Hester	Great Britain	Nip Tuck	74.900	5 Q	76.723	5 Q	80.614	4
Dorothee Schneider	Germany	Sammy Davis Jr.	74.586	6 Q	73.249	12 Q	76.289	11
Therese Nilshagen	Sweden	Dante Weltino OLD	74.429	7 Q	78.585	4 Q	80.411	5
Patrik Kittel	Sweden	Delaunay	73.857	8 Q	75.490	7 Q	77.350	9
Anna Kasprzak	Denmark	Donnperignon	73.386	9 Q	74.986	8 Q	77.696	7
Anna Zibrandtsen	Denmark	Arlando	72.957	10 Q	73.333	11 Q	77.829	6
Tinne Vilhelmson Silfvén	Sweden	Paridon Magi	72.857	10 Q	74.230	10 Q	76.789	10
Daniel Pinto	Portugal	Santurion de Massa	72.600	12 Q	70.395	23		
Diederik van Silfhout	Netherlands	Four Seasons	72.529	13 Q	72.395	14 Q	72.657	15
Edward Gal	Netherlands	Glock's Voice	72.457	14 Q	69.468	24		
Severo Jurado Lopez	Spain	Deep Impact 3	72.386	15 Q	72.199	16 Q	75.675	12
Emile Faurie	Great Britain	Lollipop 126	72.286	16 Q	70.840	20		
Spencer Wilton	Great Britain	Super Nova II	72.086	17 Q	76.078	6 Q	75.443	13
Madeleine Witte-Vrees	Netherlands	Cennin	71.643	18 Q	74.636	9 Q	77.511	8
Jorinde Verwimp	Belgium	Tiamo	71.286	19 Q	69.412	25		
Patrick van der Meer	Netherlands	Zippo	71.114	20 Q	71.303	19		
Maria Caetano	Portugal	Coroado	70.843	21 Q	70.560	22		
Laurence Roos	Belgium	Fil Rouge	70.843	22 Q	68.487	27		
Tatyana Kosterina	Russia	Diavolessa VA	70.686	23 Q	71.373	18		
Agnete Kirk Thinggaard	Denmark	Jojo AZ	70.629	24 Q	72.941	13		
Belinda Weinbauer	Austria	Söhnlein Brilliant MJ	70.329	25 Q	71.695	17 Q	74.232	14
Rose Mathisen	Sweden	Zuidenwind 1187	69.914	26 Q	72.381	15		
Arnaud Serre	France	Ultrablue de Massa	69.371	27 Q	68.193	28		
Claudio Castilla Ruiz	Spain	Alcaide	69.229	28 Q				
Marcela Krinke-Susmelj	Switzerland	Smeyers Molberg	68.857	29 Q	68.882	26		
Anna-Mengia Aerne	Switzerland	Raffaelo va Bene	68.671	30 Q	EL	30		
Jordi Domingo Coll	Spain	Mango Statesman	68.571	31 Q	67.269	29		
Pierre Volla	France	Badinda Altena	68.371	32				
Antonella Joannou	Switzerland	Dandy de la Rouche CMF CH	67.671	33				
Victoria Max-Theurer	Austria	Blind Date 25	67.543	34				
Boaventura Freire	Portugal	Sai Baba Plus	67.214	35				
Astrid Neumayer	Austria	DSP Rodriguez	67.071	36				
Elisabet Ehrnrooth	Finland	Wizard II	67.014	37				
Christian Schumach	Austria	Auheim's Picardo	66.957	38				
Tatiana Miloserdova	Russia	Awakening	66.886	39				
Ludovic Henry	France	After You	66.386	40				
Vasco Mira Godinho	Portugal	Bariloche	66.357	41				
Katarzyna Milczarek	Poland	Dzeko	66.314	42				
Aleksandra Szulc	Poland	Rumba Hit	66.271	43				
Isabel Freese	Norway	Bordeaux	66.029	44				
Przemyslaw Kozanowski	Poland	Belcanto 34	65.829	45				
Cristobal Belmonte Roldan	Spain	Diavolo Il de Laubry	65.443	46				
Robert Acs	Hungary	Rasputin	65.229	47				
Nikolett Szalai	Hungary	Willy de Hit	65.114	48				
Dina Ellermann	Estonia	Landy's Akvarel	64.943	49				
Marie Emilie Bretenoux	France	Quartz of Jazz	64.714	50				
Anikó Losonczy	Hungary	Mystery	64.671	51				
Volha Ihumentsava	Belarus	Ed Khardy	64.571	52				
Niina Nilosaari	Finland	Kom Ragdoll	64.343	53				
Hanna Karasiova	Belarus	Arlekino	64.314	54				
Terhi Stegars	Finland	Thai Pee	64.157	55				
Maksim Kovshov	Ukraine	Flirt	63.914	56				
Oksana Gusarova	Ukraine	Enrico	63.329	57				
Inna Logutenkova	Ukraine	Fleraro	62.886	58				
Stanislav Cherednichenko	Russia	Vosk	62.614	59				
Grete Ayache	Estonia	Aleandro	62.086	60				
Ala Nikanorava	Belarus	Vatikan	60.329	61				
Katsiaryna Yafremava	Belarus	Latino	57.857	62				
Joanne Vaughan	Georgia	Elmegardens Marquis	EL	63				
Charlotte Lenherr	Switzerland	Darko of de Niro ZC CH	EL	63				
Inessa Merkulova	Russia	Mister X	EL	63				
