= Equestrian at the 2016 Summer Paralympics – Team =

Equestrian – Team competition at the XV Paralympic Games

Medalists
1st place, gold medalist(s)		Great Britain
2nd place, silver medalist(s)		Germany
3rd place, bronze medalist(s)		Netherlands

== Results ==
Rank	Team	Rider	Horse	Grade	Team Test	Champ. test	Ind. Total	Team total
1st place, gold medalist(s)	Great Britain	Sophie Christiansen	on Athene Lindebjerg	Ia	77.522	78.217	155.739	453.306
1st place, gold medalist(s)	Great Britain	Anne Dunham	on LJT Lucas Normark	Ia	73.957	74.348	148.305	453.306
1st place, gold medalist(s)	Great Britain	Natasha Baker	on Cabral	II	71.882	73.4	145.282	453.306
1st place, gold medalist(s)	Great Britain	Sophie Wells	on Valerius	IV	74.405	74.857	149.262	453.306
2nd place, silver medalist(s)	Germany	Elke Philipp	on Regaliz	Ia	73.913	73.696	147.609	433.321
2nd place, silver medalist(s)	Germany	Carolin Schnarre	on Del Rusch	IV	65.833	69.905	135.738	433.321
2nd place, silver medalist(s)	Germany	Steffen Zeibig	on Feel Good 4	II	71.529	70.057	141.586	433.321
2nd place, silver medalist(s)	Germany	Alina Rosenberg	on Nea's Daboun	Ib	73.16	70.966	144.126	433.321
3rd place, bronze medalist(s)	Netherlands	Frank Hosmar	on Alphaville	IV	72.381	72.452	144.833	430.353
3rd place, bronze medalist(s)	Netherlands	Nicole den Dulk	on Wallace	Ib	70.64	71.103	141.743	430.353
3rd place, bronze medalist(s)	Netherlands	Rixt van der Horst	on Caraat	II	71.353	70.743	142.096	430.353
3rd place, bronze medalist(s)	Netherlands	Demi Vermeulen	on Burberry	II	71.824	71.6	143.424	430.353
4	Denmark	Annika LykkeDalskovRisum	on Aros a Fenris	III	70.132	70.122	140.254	428.229
4	Denmark	Stinna Kaastrup	on Smarties	Ib	71.68	73.966	145.646	428.229
4	Denmark	Susanne Sunesen	on Que Faire	III	70.158	72.171	142.329	428.229
4	Denmark	Caroline Nielsen	on Leon	II	68.412	69.057	137.469	428.229
5	Belgium	Barbara Minneci	on Barilla	II	67.471	66.714	134.185	422.834
5	Belgium	Ciska Vermeulen	on Rohmeo	IV	69.476	68	137.476	422.834
5	Belgium	Eveline VanLooveren	on Excellent	Ia	68.174	67.565	135.739	422.834
5	Belgium	Michele George	on FBW Rainman	IV	75.286	74.333	149.619	422.834
6	Norway	Jens Lasse Dokkan	on Cypres	Ia	70.652	70.087	140.739	422.375
6	Norway	Birgitte Reitan	on Steffi Graf	Ia	68.391	68.13	136.521	422.375
6	Norway	Ann Cathrin Lubbe	on Donatello	III	72.237	72.878	145.115	422.375
6	Norway	Heidi Loeken	on Armano	IV	64.238	62.333	126.571	422.375
7	Brazil	Marcos Alves	on Vladimir	Ib	66.84	68.897	135.737	418.693
7	Brazil	Sérgio Fróes Ribeiro de Oliva	on Coco Chanel	Ia	73.087	73.826	146.913	418.693
7	Brazil	Vera Lucia Mazzilli	on Ballantine	Ia	68.913	67.13	136.043	418.693
7	Brazil	Rodolpho Riskalla	on Warenne	III	66.737	68.366	135.103	418.693
8	Austria	Michael Martin Knauder	on Contessa 15	Ia	67.913	68.087	136	418.61
8	Austria	Julia Sciancalepore	on Pommery 4	Ia	67.043	66.304	133.347	418.61
8	Austria	Thomas Haller	on Puschkin 7	II	62.676	WD	62.676	418.61
8	Austria	Pepo Puch	on Fontainenoir	Ib	74.16	75.103	149.263	418.61
9	Australia	Emma Booth	on Zidane	II	65.765	69.914	135.679	415.367
9	Australia	Sharon Jarvis	on Ceasy	III	65.921	68.537	134.458	415.367
9	Australia	Lisa Martin	on First Famous	IV	72.31	71.476	143.786	415.367
9	Australia	Katie-Maree Umback	on Marquis	III	68	67.902	135.902	415.367
10	France	Jose Letartre	on Swing Royal	III	68.053	69.659	137.712	412.154
10	France	Thibault Stoclin	on Uniek	Ia	69.522	68.913	138.435	412.154
10	France	Celine Gerny	on Flint	Ib	68.44	67.552	135.992	412.154
10	France	Louise Studer	on Esmeralda Tanz	III	67.763	68.244	136.007	412.154
