= Equestrian events at the 2016 Summer Paralympics =

Equestrian at the XV Paralympic Games
- Venue: Olympic Equestrian Centre, Rio
- Dates: 11–16 September 2016

Equestrian events at the 2016 Summer Paralympics consist of 11 dressage events, ten for individual riders across five classes, and a single mixed team, mixed category event. The competitions were held in the Olympic Equestrian Centre in Rio, in September 2016.

== Classification ==
Riders are given a classification depending on the type and extent of their disability. The classification system allowed riders to compete against others with a similar level of function.

Athletes are classified according to their functional ability when mounted across four grades and five categories (Ia and Ib, II, III and IV). The grading determines the complexity of the movements riders perform with their horses during their tests, ensuring that the tests are judged on the skill of the rider, regardless of their impairment. Riders may use permitted assistive devices such as dressage whips, connecting rein bars looped reins, and the like. Riders who have visual impairments are permitted to use 'callers' to help them navigate around the arena.

Riders with recovering or deteriorating conditions such as MS are eligible but must have been reclassified within six months of a World Championships or Paralympic Games to ensure their classification is correct.

Specialised equipment including prostheses is only allowed where it has been specifically approved.

Equestrian events at the 2016 Summer Paralympics – Classification of events
Classification		Description
I	a	for riders with impaired limb function, or poor balance and good upper limb function Grade Ia riders are usually wheelchair users with impairment of all four limbs. They may be able to walk, but this is usually with an unsteady gait due to difficulties with balance and trunk stability.
I	b	for riders with impaired limb function, and/or poor balance and good upper limb function Grade Ib riders are similar to Grade Ia in that they are mainly wheelchair users. They must have poor trunk balance and/or impairment of all four limbs. Some riders will have both, but some will have just one of the two listed impairments.
II		for riders with locomotion impairment Grade II riders are often wheelchair users. Riders in this grade can have severe impairment involving the trunk but with good or mild upper limb function, or can have severe arm impairment and slight leg impairment, or can have severe degree of impairment down one side.
III		for blind riders with moderate locomotion impairment Grade III riders are usually able to walk without support but may require a wheelchair for longer distances. Riders can have moderate unilateral impairment, moderate impairment of all four limbs, or severe arm impairment. Blind riders compete in this category but must wear blacked-out glasses or a blindfold.
IV		for riders with some visual impairment or impaired function in one or two limbs Grade IV riders have an impairment of one of two limbs or a visual impairment at B2 level.

== Qualification ==
The following teams and individuals attained quota places for the 2016 Summer Paralympics Equestrian event. On 25 March, FEI announced that France and Russia, having achieved multiple quota places for individuals, would be able to field composite teams in the team competition, bringing the total number of teams in that event to 16.

Equestrian events at the 2016 Summer Paralympics – Qualification
Qualification route	Standard	Qualifiers	Quotas
2014 FEI World Equestrian Games	Top three ranked teams, 4 riders each	Great Britain; Netherlands; Germany	12
FEI World Para-dressage Rankings as of 31 January 2016	Top seven ranked teams, 4 riders each	Italy Belgium; Austria; Norway; United States; Denmark; Australia	28
FEI Regional Para-dressage Allocation	Top ranked remaining team, 4 riders each, from following regions : Africa; Americas; Asia; Oceania	- Canada; Singapore; Russia	12
FEI Para-dressage Individual Ranking as of 31 January 2016	Two qualification slots for NPC(s) not already represented : Africa; Americas; Asia; Europe; Oceania	South Africa – Mexico; Brazil; Hong Kong; Japan; Russia; Sweden – –	10
Bipartite Commission	Three qualification slots	Portugal Slovakia; Uruguay	3
Host Country Allocation	One team of four	Brazil	4
Completion of Quota Procedure	Five highest ranked athletes (regardless of region) on the FEI Paralympic Individual Ranking List plus any unused quota places	Great Britain Finland; Latvia; Netherlands; Ireland Russia; Finland; France; Czech Republic; Switzerland; Russia; Denmark; Switzerland; France; France; France	5+
Total			78

== Officials ==
Appointment of officials is as follows:

Dressage

- (Hong Kong) Alison Pauline King (Ground Jury President)
- (Netherlands) Hanneke Gerritsen (Ground Jury Member)
- (France) Anne Prain (Ground Jury Member)
- (Norway) Kjell Myhre (Ground Jury Member)
- (Belgium) Marc Urban (Ground Jury Member)
- (Germany) Marco Orsini (Ground Jury Member)
- (United Kingdom) Sarah Leitch (Ground Jury Member)

== Events ==
Equestrian events at the 2016 Summer Paralympics – Classification of events
Date	Session	Event	Grade
10 September 2016	10:00:00	Horse Inspection	
11 September 2016	10:00:00	Team Test	Grade III
	14:00:00	Team Test	Grade Ib
12 September 2016	10:00:00	Team Test	Grade IV
	13:00:00	Team Test	Grade Ia
13 September 2016	10:00:00	Team Test	Grade II
	14:00:00	Individual Championship Test	Grade III
14 September 2016	10:00:00	Individual Championship Test	Grade IV
	14:00:00	Individual Championship Test	Grade Ib
15 September 2016	09:00:00	Individual Championship Test	Grade II
	12:45:00	Individual Championship Test	Grade Ia
16 September 2016	09:00:00	Individual Freestyle Test	Grade III
	10:10:00	Individual Freestyle Test	Grade IV
	13:00:00	Individual Freestyle Test	Grade Ib
	14:10:00	Individual Freestyle Test	Grade Ia
	15:30:00	Individual Freestyle Test	Grade II

== Participating nations ==
76 athletes from 29 nations competed.

- Argentina (1)
- Australia (4)
- Austria (4)
- Belgium (4)
- Brazil (4)
- Canada (4)
- Czech Republic (1)
- Denmark (4)
- Finland (1)
- France (4)
- Germany (5)
- Great Britain (5)
- Hong Kong (1)
- Ireland (1)
- Italy (4)
- Japan (1)
- Latvia (1)
- Mexico (1)
- Netherlands (5)
- Norway (4)
- Poland (1)
- Portugal (1)
- Singapore (3)
- Slovakia (1)
- South Africa (1)
- Sweden (2)
- Switzerland (2)
- United States (5)
- Uruguay (1)

== Medal table ==
Rank	Nation	Gold	Silver	Bronze	Total
1	Great Britain (GBR)	7	4	0	11
2	Netherlands (NED)	1	2	4	7
3	Austria (AUT)	1	1	0	2
3	Belgium (BEL)	1	1	0	2
3	Norway (NOR)	1	1	0	2
6	Denmark (DEN)	0	1	2	3
7	Germany (GER)	0	1	1	2
8	Brazil (BRA)	0	0	2	2
8	Sweden (SWE)	0	0	2	2
Totals (9 entries)		11	11	11	33

== Medal summary ==
Event	Class	Gold	Silver	Bronze
Individual championship test	Grade Ia	Sophie Christiansen on Athene Lindebjerg (GBR)	Anne Dunham on LJT Lucas Normark (GBR)	Sérgio Oliva on Coco Chanel M (BRA)
Individual freestyle test	Grade Ia	Sophie Christiansen on Athene Lindebjerg (GBR)	Anne Dunham on LJT Lucas Normark (GBR)	Sérgio Oliva on Coco Chanel M (BRA)
Individual championship test	Grade Ib	Pepo Puch on Fontainenoir (AUT)	Lee Pearson on Zion (GBR)	Stinna Kaastrup on Horsebo Smarties (DEN)
Individual freestyle test	Grade Ib	Lee Pearson on Zion (GBR)	Pepo Puch on Fontainenoir (AUT)	Stinna Kaastrup on Horsebo Smarties (DEN)
Individual championship test	Grade II	Natasha Baker on Cabral (GBR)	Demi Vermeulen on Burberry (NED)	Rixt van der Horst on Jockey Club Caraat (NED)
Individual freestyle test	Grade II	Natasha Baker on Cabral (GBR)	Rixt van der Horst on Jockey Club Caraat (NED)	Steffen Zeibig on Feel Good 4 (GER)
Individual championship test	Grade III	Ann Cathrin Lübbe on Porsborggaardens Donatello (NOR)	Susanne Sunesen on CSK's Que Faire (DEN)	Louise Etzner Jakobsson on Zernard (SWE)
Individual freestyle test	Grade III	Sanne Voets on Demantur RS2 N.O.P (NED)	Ann Cathrin Lübbe on Porsborggaardens Donatello (NOR)	Louise Etzner Jakobsson on Zernard (SWE)
Individual championship test	Grade IV	Sophie Wells on Valerius (GBR)	Michèle George on FBW Rainman (BEL)	Frank Hosmar on Alphaville N.O.P. (NED)
Individual freestyle test	Grade IV	Michèle George on FBW Rainman (BEL)	Sophie Wells on Valerius (GBR)	Frank Hosmar on Alphaville N.O.P. (NED)
Team	Open	Great Britain; Natasha Baker on Cabral; Sophie Wells on Valerius; Anne Dunham on LJT Lucas Normark; Sophie Christiansen on Athene Lindebjerg	Germany; Alina Rosenberg on Nea's Daboun; Carolin Schnarre on Del Rusch; Steffen Zeibig on Feel Good 4 Elke Philipp on Regaliz	Netherlands; Nicole den Dulk on Wallace N.O.P. Frank Hosmar on Alphaville N.O.P. Demi Vermeulen on Burberry; Rixt van der Horst on Jockey Club Caraat
