= 2017 FEI European Championships =

- Host city: Gothenburg, Sweden
- Date(s): 21–27 August 2017
- Level: Senior
- Events: 3 Team, GP Special, GP Freestyle

The 2017 FEI European Championships was held in Gothenburg, Sweden, from 21 to 27 August 2017. Equestrian competitions were held in four disciplines: jumping, dressage, driving and para-dressage. The main venues were Ullevi, Heden and Slottsskogen.

== Medalists ==
=== Dressage ===
Event	Gold	Silver	Bronze
Individual special Details	Isabell Werth on Weihegold OLD; Germany	Sönke Rothenberger on Cosmo; Germany	Cathrine Dufour on Atterupgaards Cassidy; Denmark
Individual freestyle Details	Isabell Werth on Weihegold OLD; Germany	Sönke Rothenberger on Cosmo; Germany	Cathrine Dufour on Atterupgaards Cassidy; Denmark
Team	Helen Langehanenberg on Damsey FRH; Dorothee Schneider on Sammy Davis Jr. Sönke Rothenberger on Cosmo; Isabell Werth on Weihegold OLD; Germany	Agnete Kirk Thinggaard on Jojo AZ; Anna Zibrandtsen on Arlando; Anna Kasprzak on Donnperignon; Cathrine Dufour on Atterupgaards Cassidy; Denmark	Rose Mathisen on Zuidenwind 1187; Tinne Vilhelmson Silfvén on Paridon Magi; Therese Nilshagen on Dante Weltino OLD; Patrik Kittel on Delaunay; Sweden

=== Jumping ===
Event	Gold	Silver	Bronze
Individual	Peder Fredricson on All In; Sweden	Harrie Smolders on Don VHP Z Netherlands	Cian O'Connor on Good Luck; Ireland
Team	Shane Sweetnam on Chaqui Z Bertram Allen on Hector van d'Abdijhoeve; Denis Lynch on All Star; Cian O'Connor on Good Luck; Ireland	Henrik von Eckermann on Mary Lou; Malin Baryard-Johnsson on Cue Channa; Douglas Lindelöw on Zacramento; Peder Fredricson on All In; Sweden	Nadja Peter Steiner on Saura de Fondcombre; Romain Duguet on Twentytwo des Biches; Martin Fuchs on Clooney; Steve Guerdat on Bianca; Switzerland

=== Driving ===
Event	Gold	Silver	Bronze
Individual	Chardon Ijsbrand; Netherlands	Edouard Simonet; Belgium	Christoph Sandmann; Germany
Team	Koos de Ronde; Chardon Ijsbrand; Theo Timmerman; Netherlands	Mareike Harm; Georg von Stein; Christoph Sandmann; Germany	Edouard Simonet; Dries Dagerieck; Glenn Geerts; Belgium

=== Para-dressage ===
Event	Gold	Silver	Bronze
Grade I – Individual Championship Test	Julie Payne on Athene Lindebjerg; Great Britain	Elke Philipp on Regaliz; Germany	Rihards Snikus on King Of The Dance; Latvia
Grade I – Individual Freestyle Test	Julie Payne on Athene Lindebjerg; Great Britain	Rihards Snikus on King Of The Dance; Latvia	Elke Philipp on Regaliz; Germany
Grade II – Individual Championship Test	Pepo Puch on Fontainenoir; Austria	Nicole den Dulk on Wallace N.O.P. Netherlands	Stinna Kaastrup on Horsebo Smarties; Denmark
Grade II – Individual Freestyle Test	Stinna Kaastrup on Horsebo Smarties; Denmark	Nicole den Dulk on Wallace N.O.P. Netherlands	Alina Rosenberg on Nea's Daboun; Germany
Grade III – Individual Championship Test	Suzanna Hext on Abira; Great Britain	Claudia Schmidt on Romeo Royal; Germany	Erin Frances Orford on Dior; Great Britain
Grade III – Individual Freestyle Test	Suzanna Hext on Abira; Great Britain	Steffen Zeibig on Feel Good; Germany	Thobias Thorning Jørgensen on Bruunsholms Caribian; Denmark
Grade IV – Individual Championship Test	Sanne Voets on Demantur; Netherlands	Manon Claeys on San Dior 2 Belgium	Louise Etzner Jakobsson on Zernard; Sweden
Grade IV – Individual Freestyle Test	Susanne Sunesen on CSK's Que Faire; Denmark	Louise Etzner Jakobsson on Zernard; Sweden	Sanne Voets on Demantur; Netherlands
Grade V – Individual Championship Test	Frank Hosmar on Alphaville N.O.P. Netherlands	Sophie Wells on C Fatal Attraction; Great Britain	Nicole Geiger on Phal de Lafayette; Switzerland
Grade V – Individual Freestyle Test	Sophie Wells on C Fatal Attraction; Great Britain	Frank Hosmar on Alphaville N.O.P. Netherlands	Nicole Geiger on Phal de Lafayette; Switzerland
Team	Sophie Wells on C Fatal Attraction; Erin Frances Orford on Dior; Suzanna Hext on Abirrt; Julie Payne on Athene Lindebjerg; Great Britain	Stinna Kaastrup on Horsebo Smarties; Annika Lykke Dalskov Risum on Aros A Fenris; Thobias Thorning Jørgensen on Bruunsholms Caribian; Susanne Sunesen on CSK's Que Faire; Denmark	Frank Hosmar on Alphaville N.O.P. Nicole den Dulk on Wallce N.O.P. Lotte Krijnsen on Rosenstolz; Sanne Voets on Demantur; Netherlands

== Medals table ==
Host nation

Rank	Nation	Gold	Silver	Bronze	Total
1	Great Britain (GBR)	6	1	1	8
2	Netherlands (NED)	4	4	2	10
3	Germany (GER)	3	6	3	12
4	Denmark (DEN)	2	2	4	8
5	Sweden (SWE)*	1	2	2	5
6	Ireland (IRL)	1	0	1	2
7	Austria (AUT)	1	0	0	1
8	Belgium (BEL)	0	2	1	3
9	Latvia (LAT)	0	1	1	2
10	Switzerland (SUI)	0	0	3	3
Totals (10 entries)		18	18	18	54
