= Virgin Islands at the Paralympics =

- Flag of the United States Virgin Islands
- IPC code: ISV
- Medals: Gold 0 Silver 0 Bronze 0 Total 0

Summer appearances
- 2012; 2016; 2020; 2024

The United States Virgin Islands made its Paralympic Games début at the 2012 Summer Paralympics in London, sending a single athlete to compete in two para-equestrian events.

The Virgin Islands has never taken part in the Winter Paralympic Games, and no Virgin Islander athlete has ever won a Paralympic medal.

== Full results for Virgin Islands at the Paralympics ==
Name	Games	Sport	Event	Score	Rank
Lee Frawley	2012 London	Equestrian	Individual Championship IV	60.097	14th
Lee Frawley	2012 London	Equestrian	Individual Freestyle IV	63.750	14th
Ivan Espinosa	2016 Rio	Athletics	Men's 1500 m T37	5:07.00	8th
Isaiah Benjamin	2024 Paris	Athletics	Men's high jump T47	1.70 m	11th

== See also ==
- Virgin Islands at the Olympics
- Virgin Islands at the Pan American Games
