= 2014 FEI World Equestrian Games =

Worldcup of the Ride- and Drivesport

2014 Alltech FEI World Equestrian Games
- Host city: Normandy, France
- Nations: 75
- Athletes: 971
- Events: 8 disciplines
- Opening: 23 August
- Closing: 7 September
- Website: www.normandy2014.com

The 2014 Alltech FEI World Equestrian Games were held in the region of Normandy, France. It was the seventh edition of the Games, which are held every four years and run by the International Federation for Equestrian Sports (FEI). For team events in the dressage, eventing, and show jumping disciplines, these Games were the first qualifying event for the 2016 Summer Olympics.

== Venues and disciplines ==
Competition venues in the Normandy region hosted the following disciplines:

- Caen
  - D'Ornano Stadium – Jumping, Dressage, and Eventing (stadium jumping phase only)
  - Hippodrome de la Prairie (Prairie Racecourse) – Para-equestrian Dressage, and the first venue for Combined driving
  - Zénith Indoor Arena – Vaulting and Reining
  - Valley of the River Orne – second venue for Driving
- Mont Saint-Michel Bay – Endurance
- Le Pin National Stud – Eventing (cross-country and dressage phases)
- Deauville – Polo demonstration
- Saint-Lô – Horseball demonstration

== Schedule ==
All times are Central European Summer Time (UTC+2)

=== Dressage ===
Event date	Starting time	Event details
25 August	09:00	Grand Prix Day 1
26 August	09:00	Grand Prix Day 2
27 August	09:30	Grand Prix Special
29 August	13:30	Grand Prix Freestyle

=== Driving ===
Event date	Starting time	Event details
4 September	09:30	Dressage Day 1
5 September	09:30	Dressage Day 2
6 September	09:30	Marathon
7 September	08:00	Obstacle-Cone Phase

=== Endurance ===
Event date	Starting time	Event details
28 August	07:00	Team and Individual Competition

=== Eventing ===
Event date	Starting time	Event details
28 August	09:30 – 17:00	Dressage Day 1
29 August	09:30 – 17:00	Dressage Day 2
30 August	10:30 – 16:20	Cross Country
31 August	14:30 – 17:00	Jumping

=== Jumping ===
Event date	Starting time	Event details
2 September	10:00	Speed Competition
3 September	10:00	Team Competition Day 1
4 September	16:00	Team Competition Day 2
6 September	13:25	Individual Competition Qualification
7 September	15:00	Final Four

=== Reining ===
Event date	Starting time	Event details
25 August	08:45 – 18:00	Team Competition & 1st Ind. Qual. Round 1
26 August	08:45 – 18:00	Team Competition & 1st Ind. Qual. Round 2
28 August	14:00 – 16:00	2nd Ind. Qual. Competition
30 August	20:00 – 22:00	Individual Final Competition

=== Vaulting ===
Event date	Starting time	Event details
2 September	09:30 – 19:10	Compulsory Competition
3 September	09:30 – 19:10	Freestyle Competition
4 September	14:00 – 21:30	Technical Competition
5 September	10:00 – 22:00	Finals

=== Para-Dressage ===
Event date	Starting time	Event details
25 August	09:00 – 17:00	Team Test Grade II & Ib
26 August	08:30 – 19:40	Team Test Grade IV, III & Ia
27 August	09:00 – 17:00	Ind. Champ. Test Grade II & Ib
28 August	08:30 – 19:40	Ind. Champ. Test Grade IV, III & Ia
29 August	09:00 – 17:00	Ind. Freestyle Test Grade II & Ia, Ib, III, IV

== Officials ==
Appointment of (Olympic disciplines) officials is as follows:

Dressage

- (France) Isabelle Judet (Ground Jury President)
- (Germany) Dietrich Plewa (Ground Jury Member)
- (Netherlands) Francis Verbeek- van Rooij (Ground Jury Member)
- (United Kingdom) Stephen Clarke (Ground Jury Member)
- (United States) Liselotte Fore (Ground Jury Member)
- (Canada) Elizabeth McMullen (Ground Jury Member)
- (Australia) Susan Hoevenaars (Ground Jury Member)
- (Mexico) Maribel Alonso de Quinzanos (FEI Technical Delegate)

Jumping

- (Canada) Kim Morrison (Ground Jury President)
- (United States) David M. Distler (Ground Jury Member)
- (France) Rene Billardon (Ground Jury Member)
- (Portugal) Joao Moura (Ground Jury Member)
- (Switzerland) Bruno Laubscher (Ground Jury Member)
- (Spain) Santiago Varela Ullastres (FEI Technical Delegate)

Eventing

- (Australia) Gillian Rolton (Ground Jury President)
- (France) Alain James (Ground Jury Member)
- (Germany) Ernst Topp (Ground Jury Member)
- (United Kingdom) Alec Lochore (FEI Technical Delegate)

Para-Dressage

- (France) Anne Prain (Ground Jury President)
- (Germany) Marco Orsini (Ground Jury Member)
- (Belgium) Freddy Leyman (Ground Jury Member)
- (Austria) Eva Maria Bachinger (Ground Jury Member)
- (Netherlands) Hanneke Gerritsen (Ground Jury Member)
- (Hong Kong) Alison Pauline King (Ground Jury Member)
- (Norway) Kjell Myhre (Ground Jury Member)
- (United Kingdom) Sarah Leitch (Ground Jury Member)
- (Belgium) Marc Urban (FEI Technical Delegate)

== Medal summary ==
=== Medalists ===
Event	Gold	Silver	Bronze
Individual special dressage	Charlotte Dujardin on Valegro; Great Britain	Helen Langehanenberg on Damon Hill; Germany	Kristina Sprehe on Desperados; Germany
Individual freestyle dressage	Charlotte Dujardin on Valegro; Great Britain	Helen Langehanenberg on Damon Hill; Germany	Adelinde Cornelissen on Parzival; Netherlands
Team dressage	Germany (GER); Isabell Werth on Bella Rose; Helen Langehanenberg on Damon Hill; Kristina Sprehe on Desperados; Fabienne Lütkemeier on D'Agostino	Great Britain (GBR); Charlotte Dujardin on Valegro; Carl Hester on Nip Tuck; Michael Eilberg on Half Moon Delphi; Gareth Hughes on Stenkjers Nadonna	Netherlands (NED); Adelinde Cornelissen on Parzival; Hans Peter Minderhoud on Johnson; Diederik van Silfhout on Arlando; Edward Gal on Voice
Individual driving	Boyd Exell; Australia	Chester Weber; United States	Theo Timmerman; Netherlands
Team driving	Netherlands (NED); IJsbrand Chardon; Koos de Ronde; Theo Timmerman	Germany (GER); Michael Brauchle; Christoph Sandmann; Georg von Stein	Hungary (HUN); Jószef Dobrovitz; Jószef Dobrovitz jr. Zoltán Lázár
Individual endurance	Hamdan bin Mohammed Al Maktoum on Yamamah; United Arab Emirates	Marijke Visser on Laiza de Jalima; Netherlands	Abdulrahman Al Sulaiteen on Koheilan Kincso; Qatar
Team endurance	Spain (ESP); Jaume Punti on Novisaad d'Aqui; Jordi Arboix on Mystair des Aubus; Javier Cervera on Strawblade	France (FRA); Jean-Philippe Frances on Secret de Mon Coeur; Franck Laousse on Niky de la Fontaine; Nicolas Ballarin on Lemir de Gargassan; Denis Le Guillou on Otimmins Armour	Switzerland (SUI); Barbara Lissarrague on Preume de Paute; Sonja Fritshi on Okkarina d'Alsace; Andrea Amacher on Rustik d'Alsace
Individual eventing	Sandra Auffarth on Opgun Louvo; Germany	Michael Jung on Fischerrocana FST; Germany	William Fox-Pitt on Chilli Morning; Great Britain
Team eventing	Germany (GER); Sandra Auffarth on Opgun Louvo Michael Jung on Fischerrocana Fst; Ingrid Klimke on Frh Escada Js; Dirk Schrade on Hop And Skip	Great Britain (GBR); William Fox-Pitt on Chilli Morning Zara Phillips on High Kingdom; Tina Cook on De Novo News; Harry Meade on Wild Lone	Netherlands (NED); Elaine Pen on Vira Tim Lips on Keyflow N.O.P. Merel Blom on Rumour Has It; Andrew Heffernan on Boleybawn Ace
Individual jumping	Jeroen Dubbeldam on Zenith FN; Netherlands	Patrice Delaveau on Orient Express HDC; France	Beezie Madden on Cortes "C"; United States
Team jumping	Netherlands (NED); Jeroen Dubbeldam on Zenith FN; Maikel van der Vleuten on VDL Groep Verdi TN NOP; Jur Vrieling on VDL Bubalu; Gerco Schröder on Glock's London NOP	France (FRA); Simon Delestre on Qlassic Bois Margot; Penelope Leprevost on Flora de Mariposa; Kevin Staut on Reveur de Hurtebise HDC; Patrice Delaveau on Orient Express HDC	United States (USA); McLain Ward on Rothchild; Kent Farrington on Voyeur; Lucy Davis on Barron; Beezie Madden on Cortes "C"
Individual reining	Shawn Flarida on Spooks Gotta Whiz; United States	Andrea Fappani on Custom Cash Advance; United States	Mandy McCutcheon on Yellow Jersey; United States
Team reining	United States (USA); Shawn Flarida on Spooks Gotta Whiz; Mandy McCutcheon on Yellow Jersey; Andrea Fappani on Custom Cash Advance; Jordan Larson on HF Mobster	Belgium (BEL); Ann Poels on Nic Ricochet; Cira Baeck on Colonels Shining Gun; Bernard Fonck on Sail On Top Whizard; Piet Mestdagh on Spat Mano War	Austria (AUT); Martin Mühlstätter on Wimpys Little Buddy; Rudi Kronsteiner on Dr Lee Hook; Tina Künstner-Mantl on Cashn Rooster; Markus Morawitz on Dun It Whiz Jerry
Men's vaulting	Jacques Ferrari on Poivre Vert lunged by François Athimon; France	Nicholas Andreani on Just a Kiss HN lunged by Marina Joosten Dupon; France	Erik Oese on Calvador 5 lunged by Andreas Bassler; Germany
Women's vaulting	Joanne Eccles on WH Bentley lunged by John Eccles; Great Britain	Anna Cavallaro on Harley lunged by Nelson Vidoni; Italy	Simone Jaiser on Luk lunged by Rita Blieske; Switzerland
Squad vaulting	Germany (GER); Paulina Riedel; Mona Pavetic; Janika Derks; Milena Hieman; Julia Dammer; Johannes Kay on Delia 99 lunged by Jessica Schmitz	Switzerland (SUI); Nadia Buttiker; Martina Buttiker; Ramona Naf; Tajiana Prassl; Nathalie Bienz; Sally Stuckl on Will Be Good lunged by Monika Winkler-Bischofberger	France (FRA); Robin Krause; Anthony Presle; Nathalie Bitz; Dlement Taillez; Remy Hombecq; Christine Haennel on Watriano R lunged by Fabrice Holzberger
Pas-de-deux vaulting	Jasmin Lindner and Lukas Wacha on Bram lunged by Klaus Haidacher; Austria	Pia Engelberty and Torben Jacobs on Danny Boy 25 lunged by Patrick Looser; Germany	Hannah Eccles and Joanne Eccles on WH Bentley lunged by John Eccles; Great Britain
Individual para-dressage championship test grade Ia	Sophie Christiansen on Janeiro; Great Britain	Sara Morganti on Royal Delight; Italy	Laurentia Tan on Ruben James 2 Singapore
Individual para-dressage championship test grade Ib	Lee Pearson on Zion; Great Britain	Pepo Puch on Fine Feeling; Austria	Nicole den Dulk on Wallace; Netherlands
Individual para-dressage championship test grade II	Rixt van der Horst on Uniek; Netherlands	Natasha Baker on Cabral; Great Britain	Lauren Barwick on Off to Paris; Canada
Individual para-dressage championship test grade III	Hannelore Brenner on Women of the World; Germany	Sanne Voets on Vedet; Netherlands	Susanne Jensby Sunesen on Thy's Que Faire; Denmark
Individual para-dressage championship test grade IV	Michèle George on FBW Rainman; Belgium	Sophie Wells on Valerius; Great Britain	Frank Hosmar on Alphaville NOP; Netherlands
Individual para-dressage freestyle test grade Ia	Sara Morganti on Royal Delight; Italy	Sophie Christiansen on Janeiro; Great Britain	Elke Philipp on Regaliz; Germany
Individual para-dressage freestyle test grade Ib	Lee Pearson on Zion; Great Britain	Pepo Puch on Fine Feeling; Austria	Nicole den Dulk on Wallace; Netherlands
Individual para-dressage freestyle test grade II	Rixt van der Horst on Uniek; Netherlands	Lauren Barwick on Off to Paris; Canada	Demi Vermeulen on Vaness; Netherlands
Individual para-dressage freestyle test grade III	Sanne Voets on Vedet; Netherlands	Hannelore Brenner on Women of the World; Germany	Annika Lykke Risum on Aros A Ferris; Denmark
Individual para-dressage freestyle test grade IV	Michèle George on FBW Rainman; Belgium	Sophie Wells on Valerius; Great Britain	Frank Hosmar on Alphaville NOP; Netherlands
Team para-dressage	Great Britain (GBR); Sophie Christiansen on Janeiro; Lee Pearson on Zion; Natasha Baker on Cabral; Sophie Wells on Valerius	Netherlands (NED); Frank Hosmar on Alphaville NOP; Sanne Voets on Vedet PB NOP; Rixt van der Horst on Uniek; Demi Vermeulen on Vaness	Germany (GER); Elke Philipp on Regaliz; Hannelore Brenner on Women of the World; Carolin Schnarre on Del Rusch; Britta Napel on Let's Dance 89

== Medals table ==
* Host nation (France)

Rank	Nation	Gold	Silver	Bronze	Total
1	Great Britain (GBR)	7	6	2	15
2	Netherlands (NED)	6	3	9	18
3	Germany (GER)	5	6	4	15
4	United States (USA)	2	2	3	7
5	Belgium (BEL)	2	1	0	3
6	France (FRA)*	1	4	1	6
7	Austria (AUT)	1	2	1	4
8	Italy (ITA)	1	2	0	3
9	Australia (AUS)	1	0	0	1
9	Spain (SPA)	1	0	0	1
9	United Arab Emirates (UAE)	1	0	0	1
12	Switzerland (SUI)	0	1	2	3
13	Canada (CAN)	0	1	1	2
14	Denmark (DEN)	0	0	2	2
15	Hungary (HUN)	0	0	1	1
15	Qatar (QTR)	0	0	1	1
15	Singapore (SIN)	0	0	1	1
Totals (17 entries)		28	28	28	84

== Participating nations ==
74 nations participated at the games.

- Algeria (1)
- Argentina (14)
- Australia (41)
- Austria (36)
- Azerbaijan (1)
- Bahrain (5)
- Belarus (1)
- Belgium (29)
- Bermuda (1)
- Brazil (34)
- Canada (32)
- Chile (9)
- China (3)
- Chinese Taipei (1)
- Colombia (12)
- Costa Rica (5)
- Czech Republic (21)
- Denmark (21)
- Dominican Republic (2)
- Ecuador (3)
- Egypt (4)
- Estonia (3)
- Finland (17)
- France (54)
- (Georgia (country)) Georgia (1)
- Germany (49)
- (United Kingdom) Great Britain (35)
- Greece (2)
- Guatemala (2)
- Hong Kong (9)
- Hungary (16)
- India (1)
- (Republic of Ireland) Ireland (20)
- Israel (3)
- Italy (42)
- Japan (11)
- Jordan (1)
- Kazakhstan (7)
- Latvia (2)
- Lithuania (1)
- Luxembourg (6)
- Malaysia (5)
- Mauritius (1)
- Mexico (8)
- Morocco (6)
- Netherlands (32)
- New Zealand (21)
- Norway (16)
- Oman (5)
- Palestine (1)
- Pakistan (5)
- Peru (1)
- Poland (22)
- Portugal (17)
- Qatar (9)
- Russia (25)
- Saudi Arabia (3)
- Singapore (3)
- Slovakia (13)
- Slovenia (1)
- South Africa (23)
- South Korea (2)
- Spain (20)
- Sweden (36)
- Switzerland (37)
- Syria (3)
- Thailand (2)
- Tunisia (3)
- Turkey (2)
- Ukraine (7)
- United Arab Emirates (6)
- United States (49)
- Uruguay (7)
- Venezuela (4)
- (United States Virgin Islands) Virgin Islands (1)
