= Equestrian at the 2016 Summer Paralympics – Individual championship test grade IV =

Individual Championship Test Grade IV at the XV Paralympic Games
- Paralympic Equestrian
- Venue: Olympic Equestrian Centre
- Dates: 8 September

Medalists
1st place, gold medalist(s)		Sophie Wells	Great Britain
2nd place, silver medalist(s)		Michele George	Belgium
3rd place, bronze medalist(s)		Frank Hosmar	Netherlands

The Equestrian Individual Championship Test Grade IV event at the 2016 Summer Paralympics was held in the Olympic Equestrian Centre on 14 September.

The competition was assessed by a ground jury composed of five judges placed at locations designated E, H, C, M, and B. Each judge rated the competitors' performances with a percentage score. The five scores from the jury were then averaged to determine a rider's total percentage score.

The event was won by Sophie Wells representing the United Kingdom.

== Results ==
Individual championship test - Class III
Rank	Rider	Horse	Team	Scores					Final Total
Rank	Rider	Horse	Team	E	H	C	M	B	Final Total
1st place, gold medalist(s)	Sophie Wells	Valerius	Great Britain	72.143	75.476	75.238	75.119	76.310	74.857
2nd place, silver medalist(s)	Michèle George	Fbw Rainman	Belgium	74.048	73.452	73.095	77.381	73.690	74.333
3rd place, bronze medalist(s)	Frank Hosmar	Alphaville	Netherlands	74.167	70.476	73.452	72.262	71.905	72.452
4	Lisa Martin	First Famous	Australia	71.310	70.357	72.500	72.143	71.071	71.476
5	Carolin Schnarre	Del Rusch	Germany	70.476	69.405	70.714	69.405	69.524	69.905
6	Ciska Vermeulen	Rohmeo	Belgium	68.810	67.381	65.833	69.643	68.333	68.000
7	Heidi Loeken	Armano	Norway	63.333	61.548	63.333	62.857	60.595	62.333
8	Alfonsina Maldonado	Da Vinci	Uruguay	60.238	61.786	58.333	59.762	59.167	59.857
9	Nicole Geiger	Phal De Lafayette	Switzerland						WD
Ground Jury:
E	Anne Prain		France						
H	Sarah Leitch		United Kingdom						
C	Hanneke Gerritsen (President)		Netherlands						
M	Marc Urban		Belgium						
B	Marco Orsini		Germany						
