= Belinda Weinbauer =

Austrian dressage rider

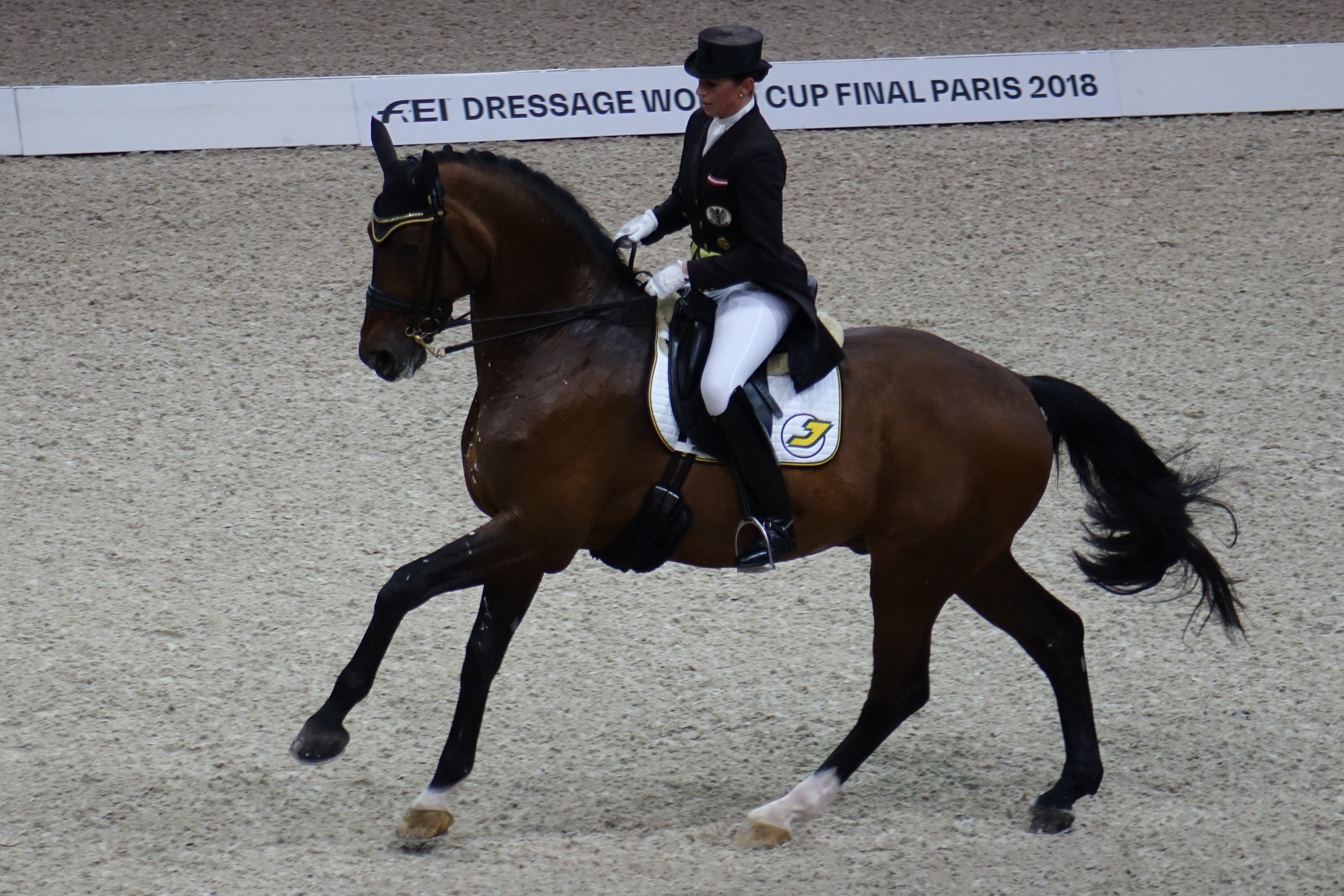
- Belinda Weinbauer during the World Cup Finals in 2018.

Personal information
- Birth name: Belinda Weinbauer
- Nationality: Austrian
- Born: 20 March 1976 (age 49)

Sport
- Country: Austria
- Sport: Dressage
- Team: RSZ Pannonia

Belinda Weinbauer (born 20 March 1976) is an Austrian dressage rider. She represented Austria at the 2017 FEI European Championships in Gothenburg, Sweden, where she finished 9th in team dressage and 14th in the individual dressage competition, finishing as best Austrian combination. In 2018 she competed at the World Cup Final in Paris, where she became 13th. She also represented Austria at the 2019 FEI European Championships in Rotterdam.

In 2021, she was selected as first traveling reserve by the Austrian Equestrian Federation (OEPS) at the Olympic Games in Tokyo.
