= Virgin Islands at the 2012 Summer Paralympics =

- Flag of the United States Virgin Islands
- IPC code: ISV

in London
- Competitors: 1 in 1 sport
- Medals: Gold 0 Silver 0 Bronze 0 Total 0

Summer Paralympics appearances (overview)
- 2012; 2016; 2020; 2024

The United States Virgin Islands made its Paralympic Games début, as the Virgin Islands, at the 2012 Summer Paralympics in London, United Kingdom, from August 29 to September 9.

The islands' sole representative was Lee Frawley, in equestrian events. Frawley was born and raised in the US Virgin Islands, though she now lives in the United Kingdom.

== Equestrian ==
Athlete	Horse	Event	Total	
Athlete	Horse	Event	Score	Rank
Lee Frawley	Rhapsody	Individual Championship IV	60.097	14
Lee Frawley	Rhapsody	Individual Freestyle IV	63.750	14

== See also ==
- Summer Paralympic disability classification
- Virgin Islands at the Paralympics
- Virgin Islands at the 2012 Summer Olympics
