= Sunesen =

Sunesen is a Danish surname. People with the surname include:

- Anders Sunesen (c. 1167 – 1228), Danish archbishop
- Gitte Sunesen (born 1971), Danish handball player
- Susanne Sunesen (born 1977), Danish para-equestrian
