= Equestrian at the 2016 Summer Paralympics – Individual championship test grade II =

Equestrian – Individual championship test, grade II at the XV Paralympic Games
- Venue: Olympic Equestrian Centre
- Date: 15 September 2016
- Competitors: 14 from 12 nations
- Winning score: 71.882

Medalists
1st place, gold medalist(s)		Natasha Baker	Great Britain
2nd place, silver medalist(s)		Demi Vermeulen	Netherlands
3rd place, bronze medalist(s)		Steffen Zeibig	Germany

The Individual Championship Test, grade II, para-equestrian dressage event at the 2016 Summer Paralympics was contested on the afternoon of 15 September 2016 at the Olympic Equestrian Centre in Rio de Janeiro.

== History ==
The competition was assessed by a ground jury composed of five judges placed at locations designated E, H, C, M, and B. Each judge rated the competitors' performances with a percentage score. The five scores from the jury were then averaged to determine a rider's total percentage score.

Natasha Baker of Great Britain defended her title, from Demi Vermeulen and Steffen Zeibig.

== Results ==
Individual championship test - Class II
Rank	Rider	Horse	Team	Scores					Final Total
Rank	Rider	Horse	Team	E	H	C	M	B	Final Total
1st place, gold medalist(s)	Natasha Baker	CABRAL	Great Britain	71.029	68.824	75.441	71.324	72.794	71.882
2nd place, silver medalist(s)	Demi Vermeulen	BURBERRY	Netherlands	69.118	70.441	70.294	75.147	74.118	71.824
3rd place, bronze medalist(s)	Steffen Zeibig	FEEL Good	Germany	69.118	72.941	72.353	71.471	71.765	71.529
4	Rixt Van Der Horst	CARAAT	Netherlands	69.412	71.029	74.265	70.882	71.176	71.353
5	Rebecca Hart	ROMANI	United States	71.324	70.735	67.5	70.441	69.706	69.941
6	Silvia Veratti	ZADOK	Italy	68.676	70.588	70.294	69.412	67.794	69.353
7	Lauren Barwick	ONYX	Canada	69.559	67.794	70	69.118	69.853	69.265
8	Claudia Schmidt	ROMEO Royal	Germany	69.265	71.176	68.971	68.235	68.382	69.206
9	Francesca Salvade	MUGGEL	Italy	68.529	69.559	70	69.118	68.529	69.147
10	Caroline Nielsen	LEON	Denmark	67.5	68.971	68.382	69.118	68.088	68.412
11	Barbara Minneci	BARILLA	Belgium	68.382	68.971	66.912	65.147	67.941	67.471
12	Erika Baitenmann Haakh	LEONORA	Mexico	67.353	65.294	66.618	65.882	66.029	66.235
13	Emma Booth	ZIDANE	Australia	63.235	69.118	65.882	65.588	65	65.765
14	Thomas Haller	PUSCHKIN 7	Austria	62.794	64.412	61.618	62.353	62.206	62.676
Ground Jury:									
E	Sarah Leitch		United Kingdom						
H	Alison King		Hong Kong						
C	Marc Urban (President)		Belgium						
M	Hanneke Gerritsen		Netherlands						
B	Kjell Myhre		Norway						
