= Equestrian at the 2012 Summer Paralympics – Individual championship test grade IV =

Equestrian – Individual championship test, grade IV at the XIV Paralympic Games
- Venue: Greenwich Park
- Date: 2 September 2012
- Competitors: 14 from 12 nations
- Winning score: 77.065

Medalists
1st place, gold medalist(s)		Michèle George	Belgium
2nd place, silver medalist(s)		Sophie Wells	Great Britain
3rd place, bronze medalist(s)		Frank Hosmar	Netherlands

The individual championship test, grade IV, para-equestrian dressage event at the 2012 Summer Paralympics was contested on 2 September at Greenwich Park in London.

The competition was assessed by a ground jury composed of five judges placed at locations designated E, H, C, M, and B. Each judge rated the competitors' performances with a percentage score. The five scores from the jury were then averaged to determine a rider's total percentage score.

== Ground jury ==
Judge at E	Anne Prain ( France)
Judge at H	Gudrun Hofinga ( Germany)
Judge at C	Freddy Leyman ( Belgium), jury president
Judge at M	Lilian Iannone ( Argentina)
Judge at B	Sarah Rodger ( Great Britain)

== Results ==
T = Team Member (see Equestrian at the 2012 Summer Paralympics – Team).

Rank	Rider	Horse	Percentage score (and rank)					Total % score	Note
Rank	Rider	Horse	E	H	C	M	B	Total % score	Note
1st place, gold medalist(s)	Michèle George (BEL)	Rainman	79.194 (1)	76.290 (1)	80.161 (1)	76.935 (2)	72.742 (1)	77.065	T
2nd place, silver medalist(s)	Sophie Wells (GBR)	Pinocchio	75.484 (2)	75.484 (2)	76.935 (2)	81.452 (1)	72.258 (2)	76.323	T
3rd place, bronze medalist(s)	Frank Hosmar (NED)	Alphaville	71.613 (4)	73.710 (4)	74.194 (3)	75.484 (4)	70.484 (3)	73.097	T
4	Ciska Vermeulen (BEL)	Whooney Tunes	72.258 (3)	75.323 (3)	71.290 (4)	71.774 (6)	67.419 (7)	71.613	T
5	Line Thorning Jørgensen (DEN)	Di Caprio	70.161 (5)	68.387 (7)	68.387 (5)	76.935 (2)	67.419 (7)	70.258	T
6	James Dwyer (IRL)	Orlando	67.742 (8)	66.290 (10)	66.452 (8)	71.935 (5)	70.161 (4)	68.516	T
7	Eleonore Elstone (CAN)	Zareno	68.548 (7)	69.355 (6)	66.129 (9)	71.290 (7)	65.806 (9)	68.226	T
8	Ulricke Dekeyzer (BEL)	Cleverboy Van d'Abel	68.871 (6)	67.258 (9)	68.387 (5)	70.161 (10)	65.323 (10)	68.000	T
9	Lena Weifen (GER)	Don Turner	65.806 (11)	68.226 (8)	64.194 (11)	71.129 (8)	68.548 (5)	67.581	
10	Nathalie Bizet (FRA)	Rubica III	67.419 (9)	69.677 (5)	67.581 (7)	69.355 (12)	63.871 (11)	67.581	T
11	Philippa Johnson (RSA)	Lord Louis	61.129 (12)	63.710 (13)	66.129 (9)	70.161 (10)	67.742 (6)	65.774	T
12	Hannah Dodd (AUS)	Waikiwi	67.097 (10)	65.968 (11)	63.871 (12)	67.903 (13)	60.968 (13)	65.161	T
13	Marianne Muri (NOR)	Fantastico	59.516 (14)	64.839 (12)	62.903 (13)	70.323 (9)	62.903 (12)	64.096	T
14	Lee Frawley (ISV)	Rhapsody	60.645 (13)	60.161 (14)	57.419 (14)	63.548 (14)	58.710 (14)	60.097	
