= Equestrian at the 2012 Summer Paralympics – Individual freestyle test grade IV =

Equestrian – Individual freestyle test, grade IV at the XIV Paralympic Games
- Venue: Greenwich Park
- Date: 4 September 2012
- Competitors: 14 from 12 nations
- Winning score: 82.100

Medalists
1st place, gold medalist(s)		Michèle George	Belgium
2nd place, silver medalist(s)		Sophie Wells	Great Britain
3rd place, bronze medalist(s)		Frank Hosmar	Netherlands

The individual freestyle test, grade IV, para-equestrian dressage event at the 2012 Summer Paralympics was contested on 4 September at Greenwich Park in London.

The competition was assessed by a ground jury composed of five judges placed at locations designated E, H, C, M, and B. Each judge rated the competitors' performances with percentage scores for technical difficulty and artistic merit. The ten scores from the jury were then averaged to determine a rider's total percentage score.

== Ground jury ==
Judge at E	Carlos Lopes ( Portugal)
Judge at H	Freddy Leyman ( Belgium)
Judge at C	Kjell Myhre ( Norway), jury president
Judge at M	Gudrun Hofinga ( Germany)
Judge at B	Anne Prain ( France)

== Results ==
Rank	Rider	Horse		Technical/Artistic & (Rank)					Tech/Art % (Rk)	Total % score
Rank	Rider	Horse		E	H	C	M	B	Tech/Art % (Rk)	Total % score
1st place, gold medalist(s)	Michèle George (BEL)	Rainman		85.000 (1)	83.750 (1)	78.000 (3)	83.000 (1)	80.750 (2)		82.100
1st place, gold medalist(s)	Michèle George (BEL)	Rainman	Tech:	82.000 (1)	81.000 (1)	76.000 (1)	78.000 (2)	79.000 (1)	79.200 (1)	
1st place, gold medalist(s)	Michèle George (BEL)	Rainman	Art:	88.000 (1)	86.500 (1)	80.000 (4)	88.000 (1)	82.500 (2)	85.000 (1)	
2nd place, silver medalist(s)	Sophie Wells (GBR)	Pinocchio		81.500 (2)	82.250 (2)	78.250 (1)	80.500 (2)	83.250 (1)		81.150
2nd place, silver medalist(s)	Sophie Wells (GBR)	Pinocchio	Tech:	76.000 (2)	78.000 (2)	75.000 (2)	78.500 (1)	79.000 (1)	77.300 (2)	
2nd place, silver medalist(s)	Sophie Wells (GBR)	Pinocchio	Art:	87.000 (2)	86.500 (1)	81.500 (1)	82.500 (2)	87.500 (1)	85.000 (1)	
3rd place, bronze medalist(s)	Frank Hosmar (NED)	Alphaville		79.250 (4)	80.000 (3)	78.250 (1)	77.250 (4)	78.250 (3)		78.600
3rd place, bronze medalist(s)	Frank Hosmar (NED)	Alphaville	Tech:	76.000 (2)	77.500 (3)	75.000 (2)	76.000 (3)	75.000 (3)	75.900 (3)	
3rd place, bronze medalist(s)	Frank Hosmar (NED)	Alphaville	Art:	82.500 (4)	82.500 (3)	81.500 (1)	78.500 (4)	81.500 (3)	81.300 (3)	
4	Line Thorning Jørgensen (DEN)	Di Caprio		80.000 (3)	77.000 (5)	76.500 (4)	77.500 (3)	73.000 (6)		76.800
4	Line Thorning Jørgensen (DEN)	Di Caprio	Tech:	76.000 (2)	72.000 (6)	71.500 (4)	75.000 (4)	70.000 (7)	72.900 (5)	
4	Line Thorning Jørgensen (DEN)	Di Caprio	Art:	84.000 (3)	82.000 (4)	81.500 (1)	80.000 (3)	76.000 (5)	80.700 (4)	
5	Ciska Vermeulen (BEL)	Whooney Tunes		79.000 (5)	78.000 (4)	71.750 (6)	73.750 (7)	72.500 (7)		75.000
5	Ciska Vermeulen (BEL)	Whooney Tunes	Tech:	76.000 (2)	77.500 (3)	70.000 (6)	72.000 (6)	71.500 (6)	73.400 (4)	
5	Ciska Vermeulen (BEL)	Whooney Tunes	Art:	82.000 (5)	78.500 (7)	73.500 (8)	75.500 (7)	73.500 (7)	76.600 (6)	
6	James Dwyer (IRL)	Orlando		74.250 (7)	76.750 (6)	75.250 (5)	72.000 (8)	73.750 (5)		74.400
6	James Dwyer (IRL)	Orlando	Tech:	72.500 (7)	74.000 (5)	71.500 (4)	70.000 (9)	72.500 (4)	72.100 (6)	
6	James Dwyer (IRL)	Orlando	Art:	76.000 (7)	79.500 (5)	79.000 (5)	74.000 (8)	75.000 (6)	76.700 (5)	
7	Nathalie Bizet (FRA)	Rubica Iii		75.500 (6)	69.750 (9)	71.500 (7)	75.250 (5)	75.500 (4)		73.500
7	Nathalie Bizet (FRA)	Rubica Iii	Tech:	73.000 (6)	67.500 (9)	67.500 (9)	73.000 (5)	72.500 (4)	70.700 (7)	
7	Nathalie Bizet (FRA)	Rubica Iii	Art:	78.000 (6)	72.000 (9)	75.500 (6)	77.500 (5)	78.500 (4)	76.300 (7)	
8	Lena Weifen (GER)	Don Turner		69.750 (8)	75.250 (7)	71.250 (9)	74.250 (6)	70.000 (8)		72.100
8	Lena Weifen (GER)	Don Turner	Tech:	68.500 (8)	71.000 (7)	67.500 (9)	72.000 (6)	67.000 (8)	69.200 (8)	
8	Lena Weifen (GER)	Don Turner	Art:	71.000 (9)	79.500 (5)	75.000 (7)	76.500 (6)	73.000 (8)	75.000 (8)	
9	Ulricke Dekeyzer (BEL)	Cleverboy Van D'Abel		68.250 (11)	69.750 (9)	71.500 (7)	71.000 (9)	67.250 (10)		69.550
9	Ulricke Dekeyzer (BEL)	Cleverboy Van D'Abel	Tech:	68.000 (9)	67.500 (9)	69.500 (7)	71.000 (8)	66.500 (9)	68.500 (9)	
9	Ulricke Dekeyzer (BEL)	Cleverboy Van D'Abel	Art:	68.500 (11)	72.000 (9)	73.500 (8)	71.000 (9)	68.000 (10)	70.600 (10)	
10	Eleonore Elstone (CAN)	Zareno		69.250 (9)	67.250 (11)	69.500 (11)	68.750 (11)	69.000 (9)		68.750
10	Eleonore Elstone (CAN)	Zareno	Tech:	66.000 (11)	66.000 (11)	68.000 (8)	67.500 (11)	66.500 (9)	66.800 (10)	
10	Eleonore Elstone (CAN)	Zareno	Art:	72.500 (8)	68.500 (12)	71.000 (11)	70.000 (10)	71.500 (9)	70.700 (9)	
11	Hannah Dodd (AUS)	Waikiwi		66.500 (12)	67.000 (12)	70.000 (10)	68.000 (12)	67.000 (11)		67.700
11	Hannah Dodd (AUS)	Waikiwi	Tech:	65.000 (12)	64.000 (12)	67.500 (9)	67.500 (11)	66.500 (9)	66.100 (11)	
11	Hannah Dodd (AUS)	Waikiwi	Art:	68.000 (12)	70.000 (11)	72.500 (10)	68.500 (12)	67.500 (11)	69.300 (11)	
12	Philippa Johnson (RSA)	Lord Louis		64.000 (14)	73.000 (8)	66.500 (13)	67.250 (13)	65.250 (12)		67.200
12	Philippa Johnson (RSA)	Lord Louis	Tech:	63.500 (13)	68.000 (8)	64.500 (13)	66.000 (13)	64.000 (12)	65.200 (13)	
12	Philippa Johnson (RSA)	Lord Louis	Art:	64.500 (14)	78.000 (8)	68.500 (12)	68.500 (12)	66.500 (13)	69.200 (12)	
13	Marianne Muri (NOR)	Fantastico		68.750 (10)	65.500 (13)	67.000 (12)	69.250 (10)	64.500 (14)		67.000
13	Marianne Muri (NOR)	Fantastico	Tech:	67.500 (10)	64.000 (12)	66.500 (12)	68.500 (10)	61.500 (14)	65.600 (12)	
13	Marianne Muri (NOR)	Fantastico	Art:	70.000 (10)	67.000 (13)	67.500 (13)	70.000 (10)	67.500 (11)	68.400 (13)	
14	Lee Frawley (ISV)	Rhapsody		64.250 (13)	62.250 (14)	65.500 (14)	62.000 (14)	64.750 (13)		63.750
14	Lee Frawley (ISV)	Rhapsody	Tech:	62.500 (14)	59.500 (14)	64.500 (13)	62.000 (14)	63.500 (13)	62.400 (14)	
14	Lee Frawley (ISV)	Rhapsody	Art:	66.000 (13)	65.000 (14)	66.500 (14)	62.000 (14)	66.000 (14)	65.100 (14)	
