= Equestrian at the 2024 Summer Paralympics – Individual championship test grade V =

Equestrian – Individual championship test, grade V at the XVII Paralympic Games
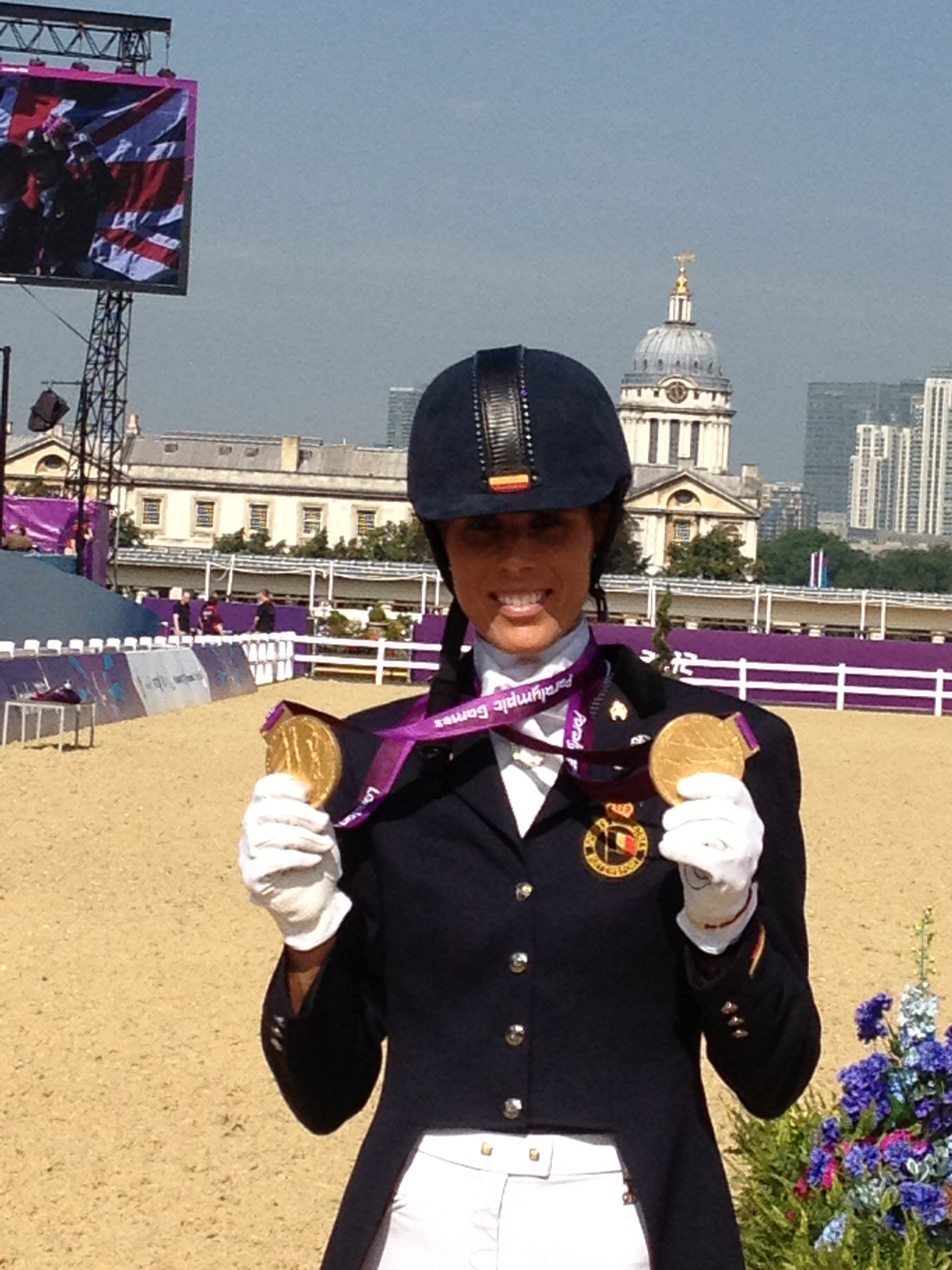
- Michele George.
- Venue: Palace of Versailles
- Date: 4 September 2024
- Competitors: 17 from 14 nations
- Winning score: 76.692

Medalists
1st place, gold medalist(s)		Michele George riding Best Of 8	Belgium
2nd place, silver medalist(s)		Regine Mispelkamp riding Highlander Delight'S	Germany
3rd place, bronze medalist(s)		Sophie Wells riding Ljt Egebjerggards Samoa	Great Britain

The individual championship test, grade , para-equestrian dressage event at the 2024 Summer Paralympics was held on 4 September, 2024 at the Palace of Versailles in Paris.

The competition was assessed by a ground jury composed of five judges placed at locations designated E, H, C, M, and B. Each judge rated the competitors' performances with a percentage score. The five scores from the jury were then averaged to determine a rider's total percentage score.

== Classification ==
Grade V riders are described by the IPC as "athletes have vision impairment, complete blindness, a mildly impaired range of movement or muscle strength, or a deficiency of one limb or mild deficiency of two limbs."

== Results ==
Riders performed one test apiece. In addition to being an event in its own right, the Championship test was the qualification round for the Freestyle event, with the top eight riders progressing to the second final. 27 Riders started the event.

Rank	Rider Horse	Nation	Scores					Total	FSQ
Rank	Rider Horse	Nation	E	H	C	M	B	Total	FSQ
1st place, gold medalist(s)	Michele George riding Best Of 8	Belgium (BEL)	75.000	75.641	77.821	75.641	79.359	76.692	Q
2nd place, silver medalist(s)	Regine Mispelkamp riding Highlander Delight'S	Germany (GER)	69.103	72.821	72.692	74.231	77.308	73.231	Q
3rd place, bronze medalist(s)	Sophie Wells riding Ljt Egebjerggards Samoa	Great Britain (GBR)	70.385	72.692	73.462	71.667	73.077	72.257	Q
4	Isabell Nowak riding Siracusa Old	Germany (GER)	72.179	70.641	73.590	69.359	70.641	71.282	Q
5	Lisa Martin riding Vilaggio	Australia (AUS)	72.436	70.513	70.513	69.487	69.231	70.436	Q
6	Kevin van Ham riding Eros Van Ons Heem	Belgium (BEL)	66.923	71.410	68.974	70.385	70.769	69.692	Q
7	Rodolpho Riskalla riding Denzel	Brazil (BRA)	70.256	69.487	68.077	67.179	73.077	69.615	Q
8	Lotta Wallin riding Questionmark	Sweden (SWE)	70.128	69.615	68.718	69.359	67.308	69.026	Q
9	Sarah Slattery riding Savona	Ireland (IRL)	66.795	69.231	67.564	68.205	70.256	68.410	
10	Federica Sileoni riding Leonardo	Italy (ITA)	66.154	69.359	69.103	68.462	67.949	68.205	
11	Christina Marcussen riding Zorro Hoejris	Norway (NOR)	67.051	67.949	68.718	68.205	67.949	67.974	
11	Jonna Aaltonen riding Laxton For U	Finland (FIN)	67.949	66.667	68.077	66.282	70.897	67.974	
13	Ildiko Fonyodi riding Bojengel	Hungary (HUN)	67.051	68.333	68.974	68.590	65.897	67.769	
14	Nicole Geiger riding Donar Weltino	Switzerland (SUI)	65.256	65.513	67.692	65.128	68.846	66.487	
15	Kirsten Kristine Vik riding Bonfire	Norway (NOR)	65.013	65.910	66.679	64.244	67.064	65.782	
16	Ahmed Al-Sharbatly riding Godiva Dii	Saudi Arabia (KSA)	64.744	66.667	64.103	63.974	67.051	65.308	
17	Lisa Cez riding Stallone De Hus	France (FRA)	61.282	61.795	66.154	65.256	61.923	63.282	
