= Virgin Islands at the 2016 Summer Paralympics =

- Flag of the United States Virgin Islands
- IPC code: ISV

in Rio de Janeiro
- Competitors: 1 in 1 sports
- Flag bearer: Ivan Espinosa
- Medals: Gold 0 Silver 0 Bronze 0 Total 0

Summer Paralympics appearances (overview)
- 2012; 2016; 2020; 2024

The United States Virgin Islands (USVI) sent a delegation to compete at the 2016 Summer Paralympics in Rio de Janeiro, Brazil, from 7–18 September 2016. This was the Virgin Islands' second time competing at a Summer Paralympic Games. They were represented by one athlete, Ivan Espinosa, who contested one event, the men's 1500 meters T37. In that event, he came in 8th place.

== Background ==
The United States Virgin Islands made their second Paralympics appearance in Rio de Janeiro, with their Paralympic Games debut occurring four years prior in the 2012 Summer Paralympics in London. In contrast, the Virgin Islands have been competing at the Olympic Games since the 1968 Summer Olympics. The 2016 Summer Paralympics were held from 7–18 September 2016 with a total of 4,328 athletes representing 159 National Paralympic Committees taking part. The USVI sent one competitor to Rio, in track and field, Ivan Espinosa. He was chosen as the flag bearer for the opening ceremony.

== Disability classifications ==
Every participant at the Paralympics has their disability grouped into one of five disability categories: amputation, which may be congenital or sustained through injury or illness; cerebral palsy; wheelchair athletes, though there is often overlap between this and other categories; visual impairment, including blindness; and Les autres, which is any physical disability that does not fall strictly under one of the other categories, like dwarfism or multiple sclerosis. Each Paralympic sport then has its own classifications, dependent upon the specific physical demands of competition. Events are given a code, made of numbers and letters, describing the type of event and classification of the athletes competing. Some sports, such as athletics, divide athletes by both the category and severity of their disabilities. Other sports, for example swimming, group competitors from different categories together, the only separation being based on the severity of the disability.

== Athletics ==
Espinosa was 34 years old at the time of the Rio Paralympics, and these Paralympics were his second significant international competition, after the 2015 Parapan American Games. He has cerebral palsy and is classified as T37. The International Paralympic Committee describes T37 as athletes that "have moderate hypertonia, ataxia or athetosis in one half of the body. The other side of the body may be minimally affected but always demonstrates good functional ability in running. Arm action is asymmetrical. Some trunk asymmetry is usually evident." On 11 September, Espinosa took part in the men's 1500 meters T37. He finished in a time of 5 minutes and 7 seconds, which put him in 8th and last place. Michael McKillop of Ireland won the gold medal in a time of 4 minutes and 12.11 seconds; the silver medal was won by Liam Stanley of Canada, and the bronze by Madjid Djemai of Algeria.

| Athlete | Events | Final | |
| Athlete | Events | Time | Rank |
|---|---|---|---|
| Ivan Espinosa | Men's 1500 m T37 | 5:07.00 | 8 |

== See also ==
- Virgin Islands at the 2016 Summer Olympics
