= Demi Vermeulen =

Dutch Paralympic equestrian

Personal information
- Nationality: Dutch
- Born: 9 April 1995 (age 31)

Sport
- Country: Netherlands
- Sport: Equestrian

Achievements and titles
- Paralympic finals: 2016
Medal record
Equestrian
Representing Netherlands
Paralympic Games
Silver medal – second place	2016 Rio de Janeiro	Championship Grade II
Bronze medal – third place	2016 Rio de Janeiro	Team

Demi Vermeulen (born 9 April 1995) is a Dutch Paralympic equestrian.

Vermeulen competed at the 2016 Paralympic Games where she won a silver medal in the championship grade II event and a bronze medal in the team event, alongside Nicole den Dulk, Frank Hosmar and Rixt van der Horst.
