= Elke Philipp =

German Paralympic equestrian

Personal information
- Born: 4 February 1964 (age 62) Treuchtlingen, Germany

Sport
- Country: Germany
- Sport: Para-equestrian
Medal record
Paralympic Games
Silver medal – second place	2016 Rio de Janeiro	Team
FEI World Equestrian Games
Bronze medal – third place	2014 Normandy	Individual freestyle
Bronze medal – third place	2018 Tryon	Individual championship
Bronze medal – third place	2018 Tryon	Team para-dressage

Elke Philipp (born 4 February 1964) is a German Paralympic equestrian.

Philipp has had cerebellar ataxia since 1984 when she suffered from a swelling of the brain due to Viral meningitis. This resulted in her staying in hospital for 18 months, the paralysis of the left side of her brain and having to have a permanent tracheotomy.

She won a silver medal at the 2016 Paralympics in the team event alongside Alina Rosenberg, Carolin Schnarre and Steffen Zeibig. She also a bronze medal at the 2014 FEI World Equestrian Games in individual freestyle event and two bronze medals at the 2018 FEI World Equestrian Games in the individual championship and team para-dressage events.

She has also competed in para-skiing events and works as a senior laboratory assistant.
