= Virgin Islands at the 2024 Summer Paralympics =

- Flag of the U.S. Virgin Islands
- IPC code: ISV
- NPC: National Paralympic Committee US Virgin Islands

in Paris, France August 28, 2024 – September 8, 2024
- Competitors: 1 (1 man) in 1 sport
- Flag bearer: Isaiah Benjamin
- Medals: Gold 0 Silver 0 Bronze 0 Total 0

Summer Paralympics appearances (overview)
- 2012; 2016; 2020; 2024

The United States Virgin Islands competed at the 2024 Summer Paralympics in Paris, France, from 28 August to 8 September 2024. This was the nation's fourth time competing at the Summer Paralympic Games after it made its debut at the 2012 Summer Paralympics. The delegation consisted of only one competitor from one sport.

== Competitors ==
The following is the list of number of competitors in the Games.

Sport	Men	Women	Total
Athletics	1	0	1
Total	1	0	1

== Athletics ==
Athlete	Event	Final	
Athlete	Event	Result	Rank
Isaiah Benjamin	Men's high jump T47	1.70	11

== See also ==
- Virgin Islands at the 2024 Summer Olympics
- Virgin Islands at the Paralympics
