= Vasco Mira Godinho =

Portuguese equestrian

Personal information
- Born: Vasco Mira Godinho; Sep 5, 1989 (age 36) Evora, Portugal

Sport
- Country: Portugal
- Sport: Equestrian

Achievements and titles
- World finals: 2018 FEI World Equestrian Games

Vasco Mira Godinho (born 5 September 1989, Evora) is a Portuguese equestrian athlete. He competed at the 2018 FEI World Equestrian Games and at the 2017 FEI European Championships in Gothenburg.
