= Equestrian at the 2024 Summer Paralympics – Individual freestyle test grade V =

Equestrian – Individual freestyle test, grade V at the XVII Paralympic Games
- Venue: Palais de Versailles
- Date: 7 September 2024
- Competitors: 8 from 6 nations
- Winning score: 81.37

Medalists
1st place, gold medalist(s)		Michele George on Best Of 8	Belgium
2nd place, silver medalist(s)		Regine Mispelkamp on Highlander Delight's	Germany
3rd place, bronze medalist(s)		Sophie Wells on Ljt Egebjerggards Samoa	Great Britain

The individual freestyle test, grade V, para-equestrian dressage event at the 2024 Summer Paralympics was contested on the afternoon of 7 September 2024 at the Olympic Equestrian Centre in Rio de Janeiro.

The competition was assessed by a ground jury composed of five judges placed at locations designated E, H, C, M, and B. Each judge rated the competitors' performances with a percentage score across two areas - technique and artistry. The ten scores from the jury were then averaged to determine a rider's total percentage score.

== Ground jury ==
Judge at E	Hanneke Gerritsen ( Netherlands)
Judge at H	Anne Prain ( France)
Judge at C	Sarah Leitch ( Great Britain), jury president
Judge at M	Marc Urban ( Belgium)
Judge at B	Alison King ( Hong Kong)

== Results ==
Rank	Rider Horse	Nationality	Section	E	H	C	M	B	Avg	Result
1st place, gold medalist(s)	Michele George; Best Of 8	Belgium		79.18	85.55	81.08	80.18	81.38		81.47
1st place, gold medalist(s)	Michele George; Best Of 8	Belgium	Tech.	76.75	80.50	78.75	76.75	75.75	77.70	81.47
1st place, gold medalist(s)	Michele George; Best Of 8	Belgium	Art.	81.60	90.60	83.40	83.60	87.00	85.24	81.47
2nd place, silver medalist(s)	Regine Mispelkamp; Highlander Delight's	Germany		83.10	80.10	78.70	75.25	83.35		80.10
2nd place, silver medalist(s)	Regine Mispelkamp; Highlander Delight's	Germany	Tech.	80.00	76.00	76.00	75.50	75.50	76.60	80.10
2nd place, silver medalist(s)	Regine Mispelkamp; Highlander Delight's	Germany	Art.	86.20	84.20	81.40	75.00	91.20	83.60	80.10
3rd place, bronze medalist(s)	Sophie Wells; Ljt Egebjerggards Samoa	Great Britain		76.53	74.15	73.48	74.58	78.50		75.45
3rd place, bronze medalist(s)	Sophie Wells; Ljt Egebjerggards Samoa	Great Britain	Tech.	72.25	69.50	70.75	72.75	73.00	71.65	75.45
3rd place, bronze medalist(s)	Sophie Wells; Ljt Egebjerggards Samoa	Great Britain	Art.	80.80	78.80	76.20	76.40	84.00	79.24	75.45
4	Isabell Nowak; Siracusa Old	Germany		72.68	74.80	71.50	74.43	74.30		73.54
4	Isabell Nowak; Siracusa Old	Germany	Tech.	69.75	72.00	69.00	72.25	68.00	70.20	73.54
4	Isabell Nowak; Siracusa Old	Germany	Art.	75.60	77.60	74.00	76.60	80.60	76.88	73.54
5	Kevin van Ham; Eros Van Ons Heem	Belgium		71.05	72.48	74.75	71.30	75.48		73.01
5	Kevin van Ham; Eros Van Ons Heem	Belgium	Tech.	68.50	68.75	71.50	69.00	69.75	69.50	73.01
5	Kevin van Ham; Eros Van Ons Heem	Belgium	Art.	73.60	76.20	78.00	73.60	81.20	76.52	73.01
6	Lisa Martin; Vilaggio	Australia		68.13	73.33	73.45	70.38	74.25		71.91
6	Lisa Martin; Vilaggio	Australia	Tech.	65.25	70.25	69.50	67.75	68.50	68.25	71.91
6	Lisa Martin; Vilaggio	Australia	Art.	71.00	76.40	77.40	73.00	80.00	75.56	71.91
7	Sarah Slattery; Savona	Ireland		70.55	70.65	74.45	71.75	71.58		71.80
7	Sarah Slattery; Savona	Ireland	Tech.	68.50	68.50	71.50	69.50	67.75	69.15	71.80
7	Sarah Slattery; Savona	Ireland	Art.	72.60	72.80	77.40	74.00	75.40	74.44	71.80
8	Lotta Wallin; Questionmark	Sweden		69.93	66.93	69.70	69.70	76.58		70.57
8	Lotta Wallin; Questionmark	Sweden	Tech.	66.25	64.25	68.00	68.00	69.75	67.25	70.57
8	Lotta Wallin; Questionmark	Sweden	Art.	73.60	69.60	71.40	71.40	83.40	73.88	70.57
