= Nicole den Dulk =

Dutch Paralympic equestrian

Personal information
- Born: 23 April 1980 (age 46) Tegelen, Netherlands

Sport
- Country: Netherlands and Belgium
- Sport: Para-equestrian
Medal record
Paralympic Games
Bronze medal – third place	2016 Rio de Janeiro	Team

Nicole den Dulk (born 23 April 1980) is a Paralympic equestrian.

She became paraplegic in 2013 after a riding accident.

She competed at the 2016 Paralympic Games where she won a bronze medal in the team event alongside Frank Hosmar, Rixt van der Horst and Demi Vermeulen.
