= Antonella Joannou =

Swiss equestrian

Personal information
- Born: Antonella De Rahm; Jan 1, 1967 (age 59) Geneva, Switzerland

Sport
- Country: Switzerland
- Sport: Equestrian

Achievements and titles
- World finals: 2018 FEI World Equestrian Games

Antonella Joannou (born 1 January 1967, Geneva) is a Swiss equestrian athlete. She competed at the 2018 FEI World Equestrian Games and at the 2017 FEI European Championships in Gothenburg.

Antonella was selected as the first reserve rider for the 2021 Olympic Games in Tokyo by the Swiss Equestrian Federation.
