= Joanne Eccles =

British equestrian (born 1989)

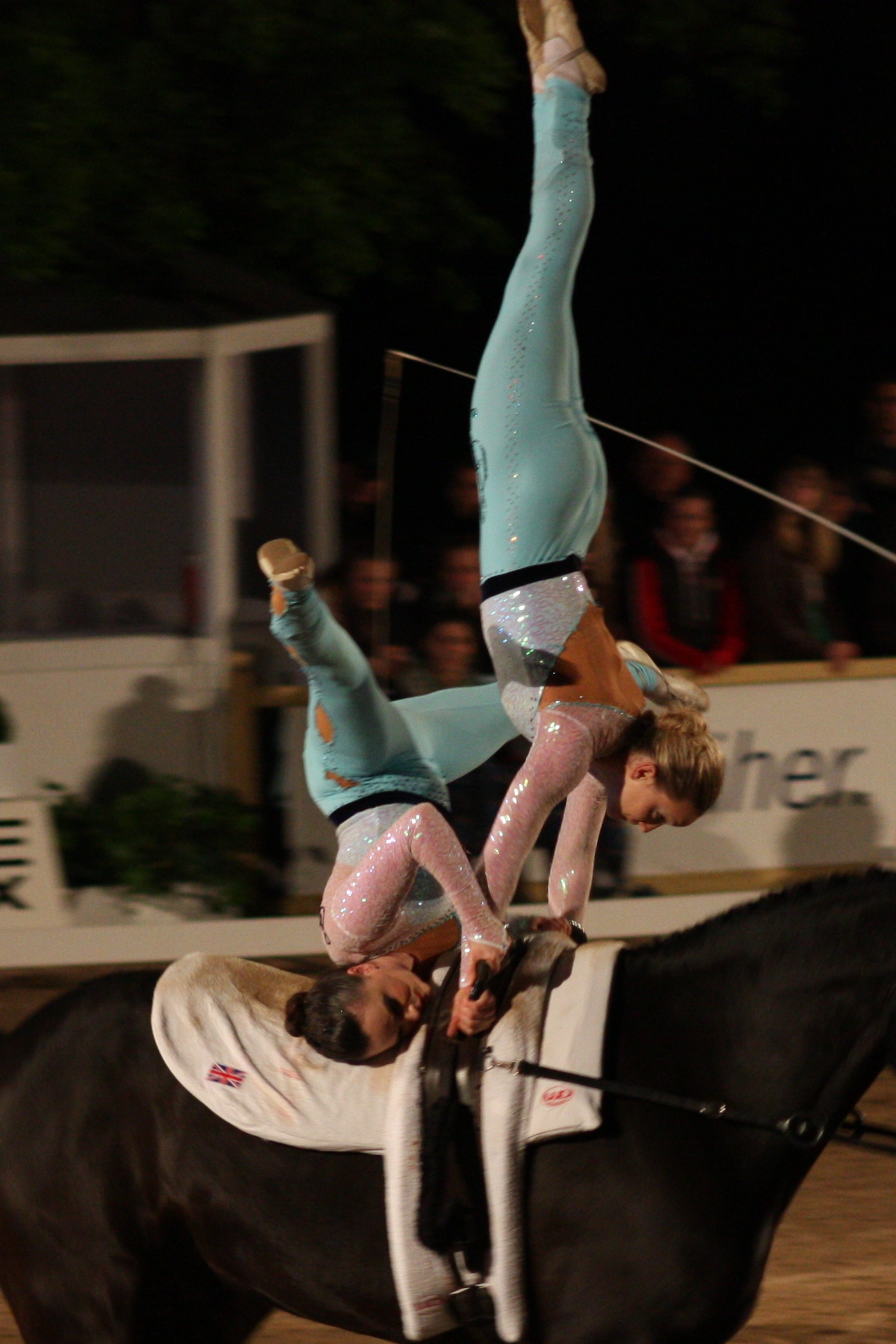
- Joanne Eccles and Hannah Eccles 2013 in Wiesbaden

Personal information
- Born: 16 February 1989 (age 37)
Medal record
Representing Great Britain
Vaulting
World Equestrian Games
| Gold medal – first place | 2010 Lexington | Vaulting – Women's Individual |
| Gold medal – first place | 2014 Normandy | Vaulting - Women's Individual |
| Bronze medal – third place | 2014 Normandy | Vaulting - Pas-de-deux |
World Vaulting Championships
| Gold medal – first place | 2012 Le Mans | Vaulting - Women's Individual |
| Silver medal – second place | 2012 Le Mans | Vaulting - Pas-de-deux |
European Vaulting Championships
| Gold medal – first place | 2009 Malmö | Vaulting – Women's Individual |
| Gold medal – first place | 2011 Le Mans | Vaulting - Women's Individual |
| Silver medal – second place | 2010 Stadl Paura | Vaulting - Pas-de-deux |
| Silver medal – second place | 2011 Le Mans | Vaulting - Pas-de-deux |
| Silver medal – second place | 2013 Ebreichsdorf | Vaulting - Pas-de-deux |
| Bronze medal – third place | 2013 Ebreichsdorf | Vaulting - Women's Individual |

Joanne Idonia Eccles MBE (born 16 February 1989) is a British equestrian who competes in the discipline of vaulting. She won the gold medals in the women's individual events at both the 2009 European Championship and the 2010 FEI World Equestrian Games. Her sister Hannah also represents Great Britain in vaulting.

== Vaulting career ==
=== Team ===
Eccles first began vaulting at the age of eight. Her neighbours were vaulters and invited her to "come and try". At the time she owned one pony which she shared with her brother and sister, and regularly competed in Highland dancing, but once she began vaulting, she pursued it as her main passion. She vaulted with that club for one year and was then invited to join the Scottish Equestrian Vaulting team. Vaulting as a reserve for most of the year, Eccles traveled with the team to the World Equestrian Games (WEG) in Rome in 1998. In 1999, she became a team flyer and was part of the official team chosen to represent Great Britain at the European Championships. As she became older she also became a "prop" or "base", but remained part of the team. As part of the Scottish Equestrian Vaulting Team, she represented Great Britain every year up to and including 2007 (excl. 2001 due to foot and mouth). They placed 4th at the European Championships in 2005, and 5th at WEG in 2006.

=== Individual ===
During her team career Eccles was also competing in Individual events, and in 2004 was selected as one of the Individual females to represent Great Britain. It was her first individual championships and she placed 19th as the youngest in her class. She was again selected for the next three years, placing 13th in Europe in 2005; 10th at WEG in 2006; and 4th in Europe in 2007. After 2007, Joanne was faced with the choice of pursuing either individual or team events, as she was too old to compete in both. She eventually decided to continue in individual events, and came 5th at the World Championships that year. In 2008, she was invited to the Masters in Leipzig, which she won, and placed second in Saumar at Easter. At the CVI */** in Ermelo, Eccles won the Senior class – a first for Great Britain. She then came 5th at the World Championships, granting her the British Female Individual Champion title. She also won many titles in pairs (pas de deux) with her sister Hannah Eccles.

Eccles won the World Equestrian games in Kentucky in 2010. She retained her title at the World Equestrian Games in Caen in 2014.

She won the gold medal at the World Championships 2012 vaulting on WH.Bentley lunged by John Eccles.

Eccles was appointed Member of the Order of the British Empire (MBE) in the 2017 Birthday Honours for services to equestrian vaulting.

=== Wee County Vaulters ===
In 2001, Joanne's father, John Eccles, brought his own horse to train for the art of vaulting, and the Eccles's started their own club, the Wee County Vaulters. It began with only 3 vaulters, one horse, and John both lungeing and coaching the team. In past years, the number has grown to 26 vaulters, two national horses, one international horse and several coaches, including Joanne.
