= Hanna Karasiova (equestrian) =

Belarusian dressage rider (born 1984)

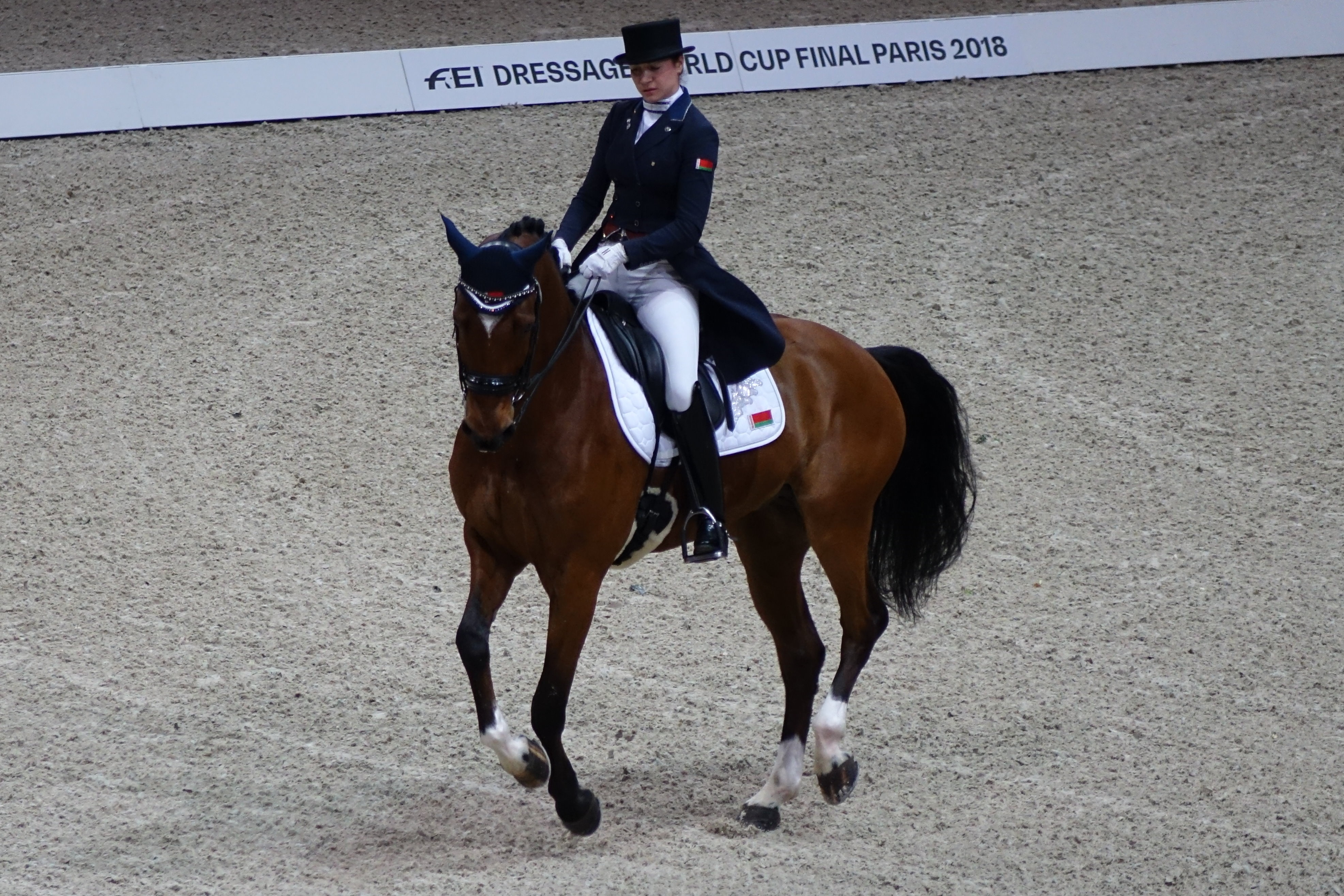
- Hanna Karasiova (2018)

Personal information
- Nickname: Anya
- Nationality: Minsk, Belarus
- Born: February 29, 1984 (age 41); Minsk, Belarus

Sport
- Country: Belarus
- Sport: Equestrian
- Club: KSK Piaffe, Rotamka

Hanna Karasiova (Belarusian: Ганна Карасіява) is a Belarusian rider who competes in dressage. She competed at the 2017 FEI European Championships in Goteborg, Sweden, and at the World Cup Finals in Omaha 2017 and Paris 2018. She has qualified for the Tokyo 2020 Olympics as an individual.
