= Alina Rosenberg =

German Paralympic equestrian

Personal information
- Nationality: German
- Born: 29 April 1992 (age 34) Constance, Germany

Sport
- Country: Germany
- Sport: Para-equestrian
Medal record
Paralympic Games
| Silver medal – second place | 2016 Rio de Janeiro | Team |

Alina Rosenberg (born 29 April 1992) is a German Paralympic equestrian.

Rosenberg has Spastic diplegia, a type of Cerebral palsy. She won a silver medal at the 2016 Paralympic Games in the team event alongside Carolin Schnarre, Elke Philipp and Steffen Zeibig.
