= Equestrian at the 2016 Summer Paralympics – Individual championship test grade III =

Equestrian – Individual championship test, grade III at the XV Paralympic Games
- Venue: Olympic Equestrian Centre, Rio
- Date: 11 September 2016
- Competitors: 16
- Winning score: 72.237

Medalists
1st place, gold medalist(s)		Ann Cathrin Lubbe	Norway
2nd place, silver medalist(s)		Sanne Voets	Netherlands
3rd place, bronze medalist(s)		Susanne Sunesen	Denmark

The individual championship test, grade III, para-equestrian dressage event at the 2016 Summer Paralympics was contested on 11 September at Olympic Equestrian Centre in Rio.

The competition was assessed by a ground jury composed of five judges placed at locations designated E, H, C, M, and B. Each judge rated the competitors' performances with a percentage score. The five scores from the jury were then averaged to determine a rider's total percentage score.

== Results ==
Individual championship test – Class III
Rank	Rider	Horse	Team	Scores					Final Total
Rank	Rider	Horse	Team	E	H	C	M	B	Final Total
1st place, gold medalist(s)	Ann Cathrin Lubbe	Donatello	Norway	72.632	73.158	72.237	68.684	74.474	72.237
2nd place, silver medalist(s)	Sanne Voets	Demantur	Netherlands	67.5	72.763	71.316	69.737	70.263	70.316
3rd place, bronze medalist(s)	Susanne Sunesen	Que Faire	Denmark	71.579	69.079	70	68.553	71.579	70.158
4	Annika Lykke Dalskov Risum	Aros A Fenris	Denmark	70.132	69.211	72.105	68.158	71.053	70.132
5	Philippa Johnson-Dwyer	Lord Louis	South Africa	68.684	69.211	68.816	72.5	70.395	69.921
6	Angela Peavy	Lancelot Warrior	United States	69.079	68.553	69.605	67.763	69.474	68.895
7	Jose Letartre	Swing Royal	France	68.816	68.421	68.684	65.658	68.684	68.053
8	Katie-Maree Umback	Marquis	Australia	68.289	66.579	69.868	66.184	69.079	68
9	Louise Studer	Esmeralda Tanz	France	68.289	67.895	67.5	67.237	67.895	67.763
10	Roberta Sheffield	Double Agent	Canada	67.763	66.447	68.684	66.579	68.158	67.526
11	Louise Etzner Jakobsson	Zernard	Sweden	67.368	65.921	68.158	66.053	69.342	67.368
12	Rodolpho Riskalla	Warenne	Brazil	66.711	65.132	67.237	65.263	69.342	66.737
13	Karolina Karwowska	Emol	Poland	67.368	66.316	65.395	66.447	65.658	66.237
14	Celine van Till	Amanta	Switzerland	66.053	64.079	68.553	65.789	66.711	66.237
15	Sharon Jarvis	Ceasy	Australia	63.816	68.684	63.684	68.158	65.263	65.921
16	Patricio Guglialmelli Lynch	Zizifo Interagro	Argentina	61.053	62.763	61.053	58.947	61.053	60.974
Ground Jury:									
E	Marco Orsini		Germany						
H	Hanneke Gerritsen		Netherlands						
C	Anne Prain		France, President						
M	Sarah Leitch		United Kingdom						
B	Marc Urban		Belgium						
