= Carolin Schnarre =

German Paralympic equestrian

Personal information
- Nationality: German
- Born: 22 July 1992 (age 33) Osnabrück, Germany

Sport
- Country: Germany
- Sport: Para-equestrian
Medal record
Paralympic Games
| Silver medal – second place | 2016 Rio de Janeiro | Team |

Carolin Schnarre (born 22 July 1992) is a German Paralympic equestrian.

Schnarre has a visual impairment. She won a silver medal at the 2016 Paralympic Games in the team event alongside Alina Rosenberg, Elke Philipp and Steffen Zeibig.
