= Madjid Djemai =

Algerian Paralympic athlete

Madjid Djemai (born 1 September 1983) is an Algerian middle-distance runner.

== Career ==
Djemai began training in track and field in 1999 and eventually qualified for the Algerian Paralympic Team. At the 2011 Pan Arab Games, Djemai earned a gold medal and later competed at the 2012 Summer Paralympics.

Djemai competed in the 2013 IPC Athletics World Championships Men's 800 metres where he placed eighth. He later competed in the 2015 IPC Athletics World Championships where he finished fifth in the 800m race. In 2016, Djemai won a bronze medal in men's 1500 metres T37 at the 2016 Summer Paralympics with a time of 4:17.28. The next year, he was selected to compete for Algeria at the 2017 World Para Athletics Championships, where he won a bronze medal in the men's 1500m.

In 2019, Djemai competed for Algeria at the 2019 World Para Athletics Championships in the 800m T38, finishing 10th.
