= Sophie Wells =

British para-equestrian (born 1990)

Sophie Wells OBE
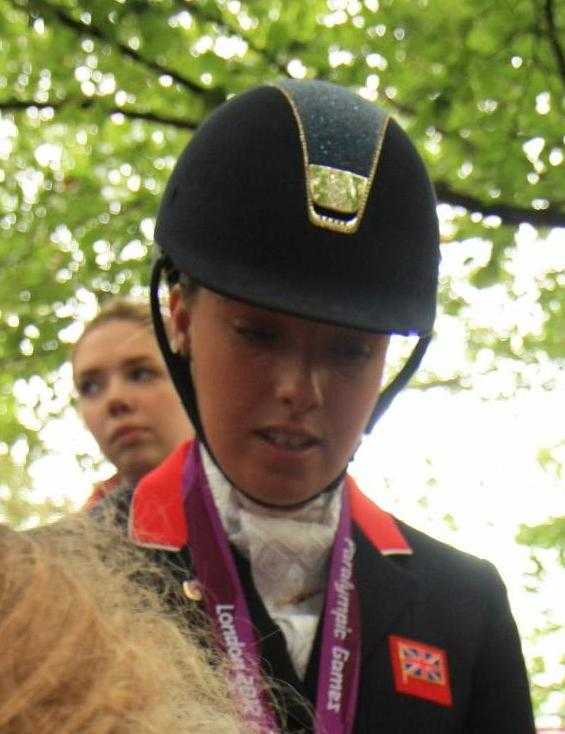
- Sophie Wells

Personal information
- Discipline: Para-dressage
- Born: 5 May 1990 (age 35); Lincoln, Lincolnshire, England
- Horse(s): Touchdown M; Pinocchio; Valerius; C Fatal Attraction; Don Cara M; LJT Egebjerggards Samoa

Website
- sophiewells.com
Medal record
Para equestrian
Representing Great Britain
Event / 1st / 2nd / 3rd; Paralympic Games / 4 / 4 / 2
Paralympic Games
Gold medal – first place	2012 London	Team championship
Gold medal – first place	2016 Rio	Championship test grade IV
Gold medal – first place	2016 Rio	Team open
Gold medal – first place	2020 Tokyo	Team open
Silver medal – second place	2012 London	Championship test grade IV
Silver medal – second place	2012 London	Freestyle test grade IV
Silver medal – second place	2016 Rio	Freestyle test grade IV
Silver medal – second place	2020 Tokyo	Championship test grade V
Bronze medal – third place	2024 Paris	Championship test grade V
Bronze medal – third place	2024 Paris	Freestyle test grade V

Sophie Wells (born 5 May 1990) is an English para-equestrian who won three medals at the 2012 London Paralympics, three at the 2016 Rio Paralympics, two at the 2020 Tokyo Paralympics and two at the 2024 Paris Paralympics.

== Personal life ==
Wells was born on 5 May 1990 in Lincoln, England. She was born with amniotic band syndrome and as a result she has no feeling or little movement in her feet and has lost numerous fingers. Because of her disability she competes in the Grade V Paralympic classification, the classification for riders with the lowest level of physical disability.

Wells completed her GCSEs and 3 A-levels (Biology, Physics & Sport) at Sir Robert Pattinson Academy in 2008, and started at the University of Lincoln doing Sport & Exercise Science, however left when entering into Year 2, to focus on the London 2012 Paralympics.

Wells is currently studying for a Post Graduate Diploma and UKCC Level 4 in Coaching through the University of Gloucestershire.

Despite the fact that she won ten medals in Paralympic Equestrian, Sophie Wells is allergic to horses.

== Equestrianism ==
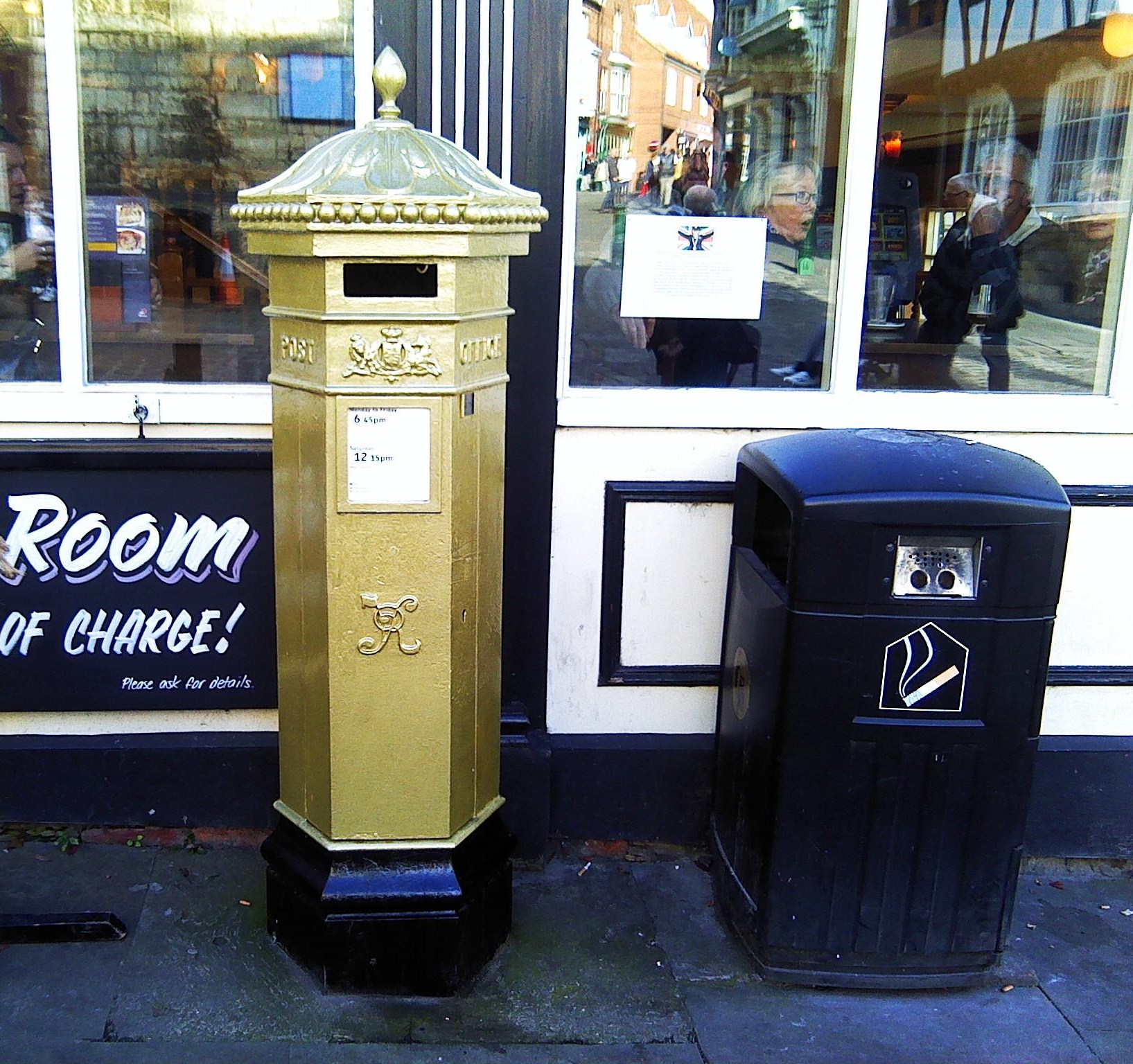
The Victorian Penfold post box in Lincoln painted in recognition of her winning gold medal performance at the 2012 Paralympics in London which is located in the cathedral quarter area of the city.

Wells took up riding at the age of eight and begin competing in dressage at the age of twelve. In 2008, she won the junior international class at Hickstead U21 International, becoming the first disabled rider to win an able-bodied international event. She was named as the first reserve rider for Great Britain at the 2008 Summer Paralympics in Beijing, China, but withdrew when her horse, Touchdown M, was found to have a tumour on his foot. The horse survived.

At the 2009 European Championships in Kristiansand, Norway, she won three gold medals; with her horse Pinocchio she won the individual and team grade IV events and was also part of the British squad that won the team championship. At the 2010 World Equestrian Games held in Lexington, Kentucky, United States, she won gold medals in both the individual and freestyle grade IV events.

She was selected as part of the dressage squad for Great Britain at the 2012 Summer Paralympics in London, United Kingdom. Riding Pinocchio she won a silver medal in the grade IV individual event with a score of 76.323%, finishing behind Belgium's gold medallist Michèle George, who scored 77.065%. Wells's result helped to secure a gold medal for the British squad, which also included Sophie Christiansen, Deborah Criddle and Lee Pearson, in the team championship. She won her second silver medal of the Games in the freestyle grade IV event, where she scored 81.150%, but was again beaten by George of Belgium.

Wells was appointed Member of the British Empire (MBE) in the 2013 New Year Honours for services to equestrianism and Officer of the Order of the British Empire (OBE) in the 2022 New Year Honours, also for services to equestrianism.

Wells has never wanted her disability to define or restrict her, wanting to prove it's about ability – not disability. Wells was the first Para rider to compete in both able bodied and para major championships in the same year (2010 and 2011). She competed at Grand Prix nationally and Internationally in U25 and Senior level on Pinocchio, and nationally on Valerius and Diadem.

=== Medals and major championships ===
2007: World Para Dressage Championships; Hartpury - UK; Non-medallist selection; 6th place Freestyle; Riding Seymours Shadow, owned by Carolyn Alston

2008: Paralympics Games; Beijing - China; 1st Reserve with call up unable to compete due to horse injury; Riding Touchdown M: owned by Nicola and Mervyn Wells

2009: Para European Championships; Kristiansand - Norway; Team Gold, Individual Gold, Freestyle Gold; Riding Pinocchio: owned by Jackie and Neil Walker

2010: World Equestrian Games; Kentucky - USA; Individual Gold, Freestyle Gold; Riding Pinocchio: owned by Jackie and Neil Walker

2010: Young Rider European Championships (able bodied): Kronberg - Germany: 24th Team Test, 18th Individual: Riding Pinocchio owned by Jackie and Neil Walker

2011: Para European Championships; Moorsele - Belgium; Team Gold, Individual Gold, Freestyle Gold; Riding Valerius: owned by Sophie Wells

2011: Young Rider European Championships (able bodied); Broholm - Denmark; 14th Team, 16th Individual: Riding Pinocchio owned by Jackie and Neil Walker

2011: Young Rider World Cup Final (able bodied); Frankfurt - Germany; 6th Freestyle

2012: Paralympic Games; London UK; Team Gold, Individual Silver, Freestyle Silver; Riding Pinocchio: owned by Jackie and Neil Walker

2013: Para European Championships; Herning - Denmark; Team Gold, Individual Gold, Freestyle Gold; Riding Valerius: owned by Sophie Wells

2014: World Equestrian Games; Caen - France; Team Gold, Individual Silver, Freestyle Silver; Riding Valerius: owned by Sophie Wells

2015: Para European Championships; Deauville - France; Team Gold, Individual Silver, Freestyle Silver; Riding C Fatal Attraction: owned by Charlotte Hogg

2016: Paralympic Games; Rio - Brazil; Team Gold, Individual Gold, Freestyle Silver; Riding Valerius: owned by Sophie Wells

2017: Para European Championships; Gothenburg - Sweden; Team Gold, Individual Silver, Freestyle Gold; Riding C Fatal Attraction: owned by Charlotte Hogg

2018: World Equestrian Games; North Carolina - USA; Team Silver, Individual Gold, Freestyle Gold; Riding C Fatal Attraction: owned by Charlotte Hogg

2019: Para European Championships; Rotterdam - The Netherlands; Team Silver, Individual Silver, Freestyle Silver; Riding C Fatal Attraction: owned by Charlotte Hogg

2020: Corona Virus Pandemic - Tokyo 2020 postponed

2021: Paralympic Games; Tokyo - Japan; Team Gold, Individual Silver, Freestyle Silver; Riding Don Cara M: owned by Rowland and Maria Kinch

Totalling 34 medals at 12 consecutive Para Championships.

Wells coaches many para and able-bodied clients, including Georgia Wilson (2019 European Gold and Silver medalist, 2020 Paralympic double Bronze medallist), Erin Orford and Izzy Palmer.

== See also ==
- 2012 Olympics gold post boxes in the United Kingdom
