= Anna Zibrandtsen =

Danish dressage rider (born 1994)

Personal information
- Born: April 24, 1994 (age 32)
Medal record
Equestrian
Representing Denmark
European Championships
Silver medal – second place	2017 Gothenburg	Team dressage
European Dressage Championships for Young Riders
Bronze medal – third place	2014 Arezzo	Team dressage
European Dressage Championships for Juniors
Bronze medal – third place	2012 Bern	Team dressage
Silver medal – second place	2011 Broholm	Team dressage

Anna Zibrandtsen (born 24 April 1994) is a Danish dressage rider. At the European Championships in Gothenburg 2017, she won teamsilver with the stallion Arlando, who was previously competed by Dutch Diederik van Silfhout at the 2016 Olympic Games. She won also several medals with the Danish team at the European Championships for Juniors and Young Riders.
