= Athletics at the 2016 Summer Paralympics – Men's 1500 metres T37 =

Men's 1500 metres T37 at the XV Paralympic Games
- Venue: Estádio Olímpico João Havelange
- Dates: 11 September
- Competitors: 8 from 7 nations
- Winning time: 4:12.11

Medalists
1st place, gold medalist(s)		Michael McKillop	Ireland
2nd place, silver medalist(s)		Liam Stanley	Canada
3rd place, bronze medalist(s)		Madjid Djemai	Algeria

The Men's 1500 metres T37 event at the 2016 Summer Paralympics took place at the Estádio Olímpico João Havelange 11 September.

The T37 category is for ambulant athletes with cerebral palsy. These athletes have movement and coordination problems on one half of their body. They have good ability in their dominant side of their body (ie hemiplegia).

== Results ==
=== T37 ===
Competed 11 September 2016 at 16:59.

Rank	Athlete	Country	Time	Notes
1st place, gold medalist(s)	Michael McKillop	Ireland	4:12.11	
2nd place, silver medalist(s)	Liam Stanley	Canada	4:16.72	
3rd place, bronze medalist(s)	Madjid Djemai	Algeria	4:17.28	
4	Hafid Aharak	Morocco	4:20.43	PB
5	Shayne Dobson	Canada	4:21.06	PB
6	Brad Scott	Australia	4:25.98	
7	Mariano Dominguez	Argentina	4:46.42	PB
8	Ivan Espinosa	Virgin Islands	5:07.00	
