= Rixt van der Horst =

Dutch Paralympic equestrian

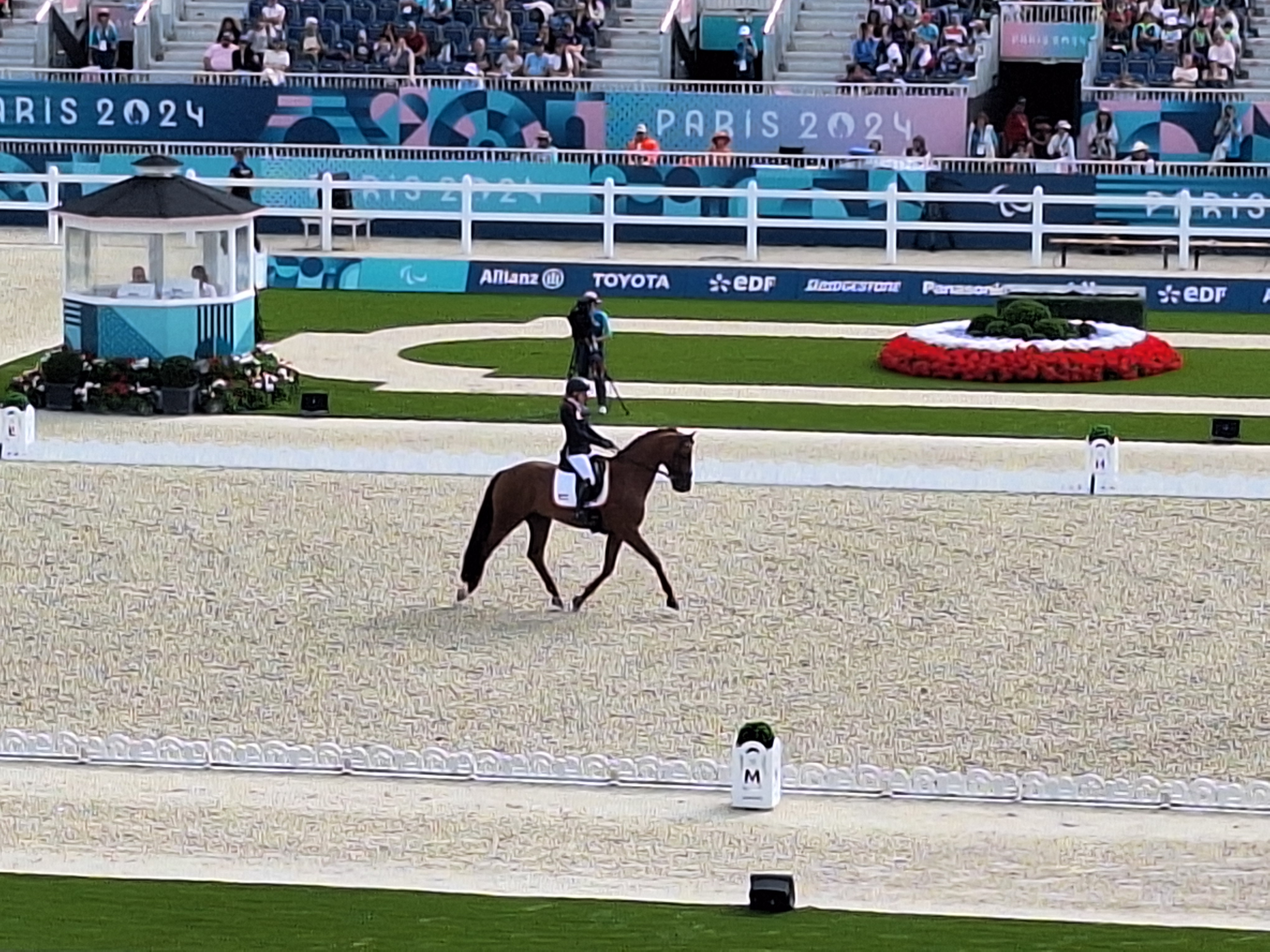
- Van Der Horst at the 2024 Paralympics.

Personal information
- Nationality: Dutch
- Born: 26 January 1992 (age 34) Luxembourg City, Luxembourg
Medal record
Equestrian
Representing Netherlands
Paralympic Games
Silver medal – second place	2016 Rio de Janeiro	Freestyle dressage
Silver medal – second place	2020 Tokyo	Team dressage
Silver medal – second place	2024 Paris	Individual dressage
Silver medal – second place	2024 Paris	Freestyle dressage
Silver medal – second place	2024 Paris	Team
Bronze medal – third place	2016 Rio de Janeiro	Individual dressage
Bronze medal – third place	2016 Rio de Janeiro	Team dressage
Bronze medal – third place	2020 Tokyo	Individual dressage
World Championships
Gold medal – first place	2014 Caen	Individual dressage
Gold medal – first place	2014 Caen	Individual dressage
Gold medal – first place	2018 Tryon	Individual dressage
Gold medal – first place	2018 Tryon	Individual dressage
Gold medal – first place	2018 Tryon	Team dressage
Silver medal – second place	2014 Caen	Team dressage
European Championships
Gold medal – first place	2015 Deauville	Individual dressage
Gold medal – first place	2015 Deauville	Individual dressage
Gold medal – first place	2019 Rotterdam	Team dressage
Silver medal – second place	2015 Deauville	Team dressage
Silver medal – second place	2019 Rotterdam	Individual dressage
Silver medal – second place	2019 Rotterdam	Individual dressage

Rixt van der Horst (born 26 January 1992 in Luxembourg city, Luxembourg) is a Dutch Paralympic equestrian athlete. She won several medals at the Paralympics including at the 2016 Summer Paralympics in Rio de Janeiro, at the 2020 Summer Paralympics in Tokyo and the 2024 Summer Paralympics in Paris. She became also the individual World Champion in 2014 and 2018 and European Champion in 2015 and 2019.
