= Rose Mathisen =

Swedish dressage rider (born 1959)

Personal information
- Born: August 25, 1959 (age 66) Stord Municipality, Norway
Medal record
Equestrian
Representing Sweden
European Championships
Silver medal – second place	2017 Gothenburg	Team dressage

Rose Mathisen (born 25 August 1959 in Stord Municipality, Norway) is a Swedish dressage rider.

== Biography ==
She was a member of the silver winning team during the 2017 FEI European Championships in Gothenburg, Sweden. In 2011, she placed 4th with the Swedish team during the 2011 European Championships in Rotterdam, Netherlands, and was the first reserve for the 2012 Olympic Games in London, United Kingdom. In 2017, she became Swedish National Champion.
