= Michèle George =

Belgian Paralympic equestrian

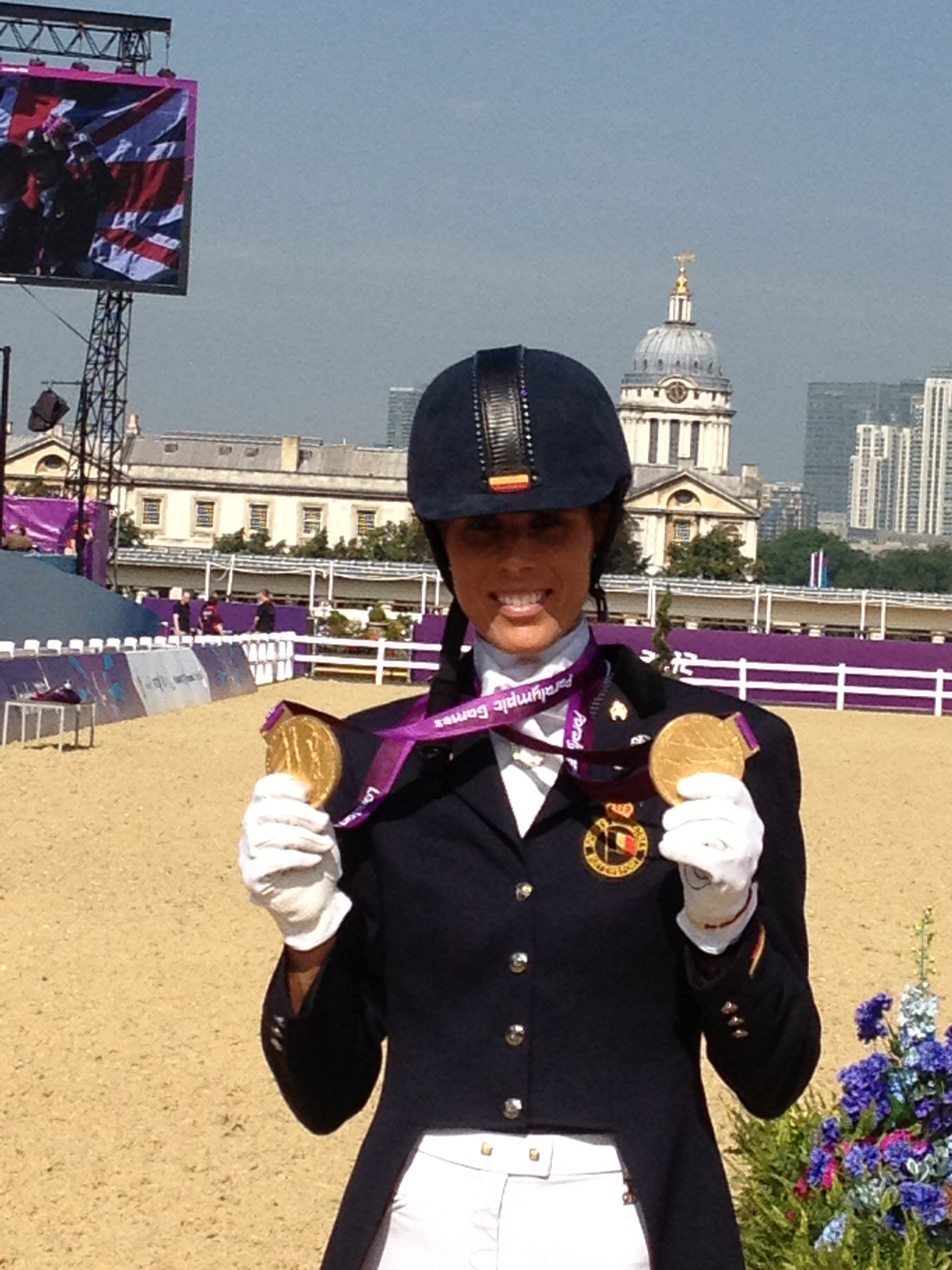
- George at the 2012 Summer Paralympics

Personal information
- Nationality: Belgian
- Discipline: Para-dressage
- Born: 2 January 1974 (age 51); Ostend, Belgium
- Horses: Fbw Rainman; Best of 8
Medal record
Para-equestrian
Representing Belgium
Event	1st	2nd	3rd
Paralympic Games	7	1	0
World Games	4	1	0
Total	11	2	0
Paralympic Games
Gold medal – first place	2012 London	Individual championship test grade IV
Gold medal – first place	2012 London	Individual freestyle test grade IV
Gold medal – first place	2016 Rio	Individual freestyle test grade IV
Gold medal – first place	2020 Tokyo	Individual championship test grade V
Gold medal – first place	2020 Tokyo	Individual freestyle test grade V
Gold medal – first place	2024 Paris	Individual championship test grade V
Gold medal – first place	2024 Paris	Individual freestyle test grade V
Silver medal – second place	2016 Rio	Individual championship test grade IV
World Games
Gold medal – first place	2014 Caen	Individual championship test grade IV
Gold medal – first place	2014 Caen	Individual freestyle test grade IV
Gold medal – first place	2022 Herning	Individual championship test grade V
Gold medal – first place	2022 Herning	Individual freestyle test grade V
Silver medal – second place	2010 Lexington	Individual freestyle test grade IV

Michèle George (born 2 January 1974) is a Paralympic equestrian of Belgium. She won seven gold and one silver medal at the Paralympic Games.

She was named "Belgian Paralympian of the Year" twice: in 2014 and in 2022.

== Early life ==
Michèle George was born on 2 January 1974 in Ostend, West Flanders, Belgium. She began riding horses in 1982, when she was 12 years old, starting on racehorses and then trying show jumping. She eventually met a dressage rider, tried the discipline and "fell in love with it".

== Career ==
After a horse-riding accident happened in 2008 that caused her to have hemiplegia in her left leg, she started competing in grade IV para-dressage.

George competed at the 2009 European Championship, where she finished second. She then competed with her gelding Fbw Rainman at the 2010 World Equestrian Games, finishing second in the individual freestyle para-dressage test.

In 2012, George and Fbw Rainman participated in the London Summer Paralympics, where they won two gold medals in the individual championship and in the individual freestyle test, making her the first winner of a gold medal in para-dressage for Belgium. In the same year, she also became the first Paralympian to win the Equestrala (Belgium's equestrian of the year award).

With the same horse, she competed at the 2014 FEI World Equestrian Games, finishing first in individual para-dressage and in freestyle.

In 2016, she and Fbw Rainman won a gold medal in the individual freestyle and a silver one in the individual championship test at the Rio de Janeiro Paralympic Games.

She then went from grade IV to grade V para-dressage.

In 2021, George and her new mare Best Of 8 went to the Tokyo Paralympic Games, where they won two gold medals in the individual championship and in the freestyle test.

With the same horse, she took part in the 2022 FEI World Equestrian Games, ending up in first place in individual para-dressage and in freestyle. In 2024, they went to the Paris Paralympic Games, winning two more gold medals in the individual championship and freestyle tests.

== Personal life ==
George has two children and she rides horses with one of them.
