= Louise Etzner Jakobsson =

Swedish para-equestrian

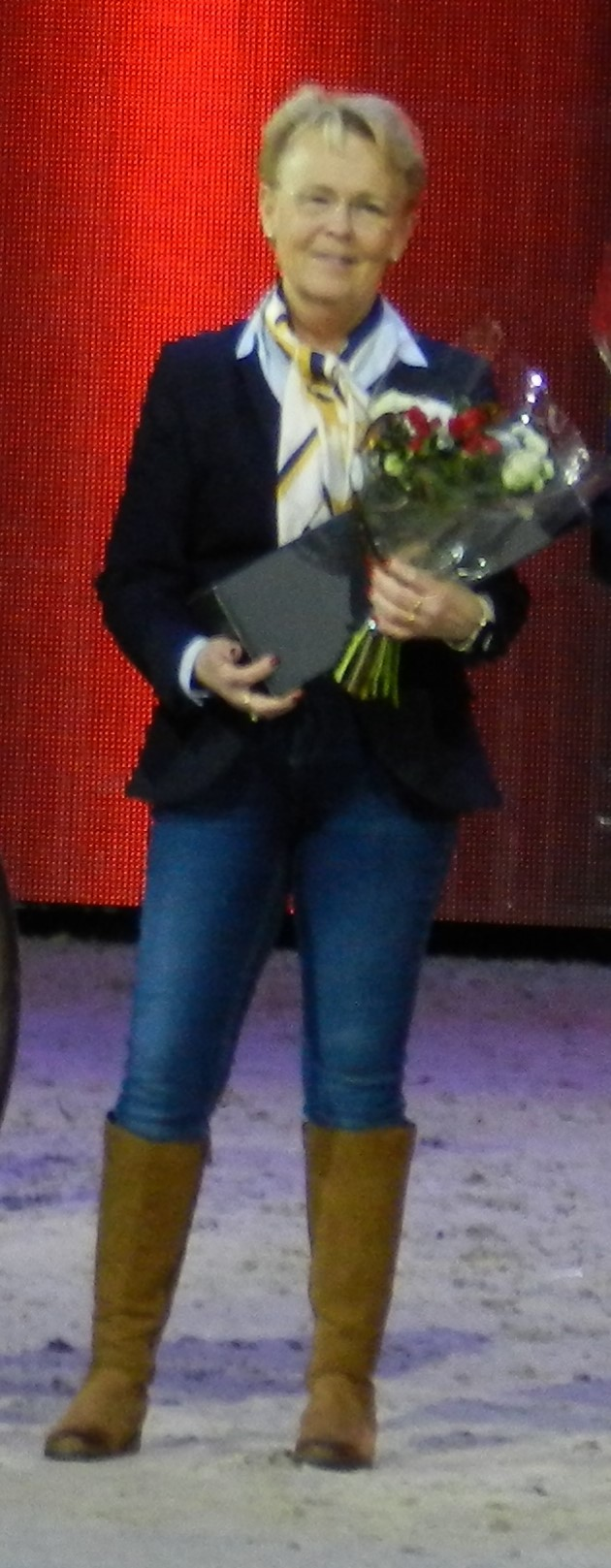

Personal information
- Born: 9 June 1960 (age 66) Eskilstuna, Sweden
- Life partner: Gunnar Jakobsson

Sport
- Country: Sweden
- Sport: Para equestrian
- Disability class: Grade III
- Event: Dressage

Achievements and titles
- Paralympic finals: Rio de Janeiro 2016
Medal record
Representing Sweden
Paralympic Games
Bronze medal – third place	2016 Rio	Ind. championship test grade III
Bronze medal – third place	2016 Rio	Ind. Freestyle test grade III
- Updated on 16 September 2016

Louise Etzner Jakobsson (born 9 June 1960) is a Swedish female para-equestrian competing at Individual Championship test, Individual Freestyle test and Team test — grade III.

At the 2016 Summer Paralympics in Rio de Janeiro, Jakobsson and her horse, the 13 year-old Swedish Warmblood gelding Zernard , won a bronze medal with the score 70.341 percent at the Individual Championship test grade III event, and a bronze medal with the score 73.650 percent at the Individual Freestyle test grade III.
