= Lisa Martin (equestrian) =

Australian para-equestrian (born 1972)

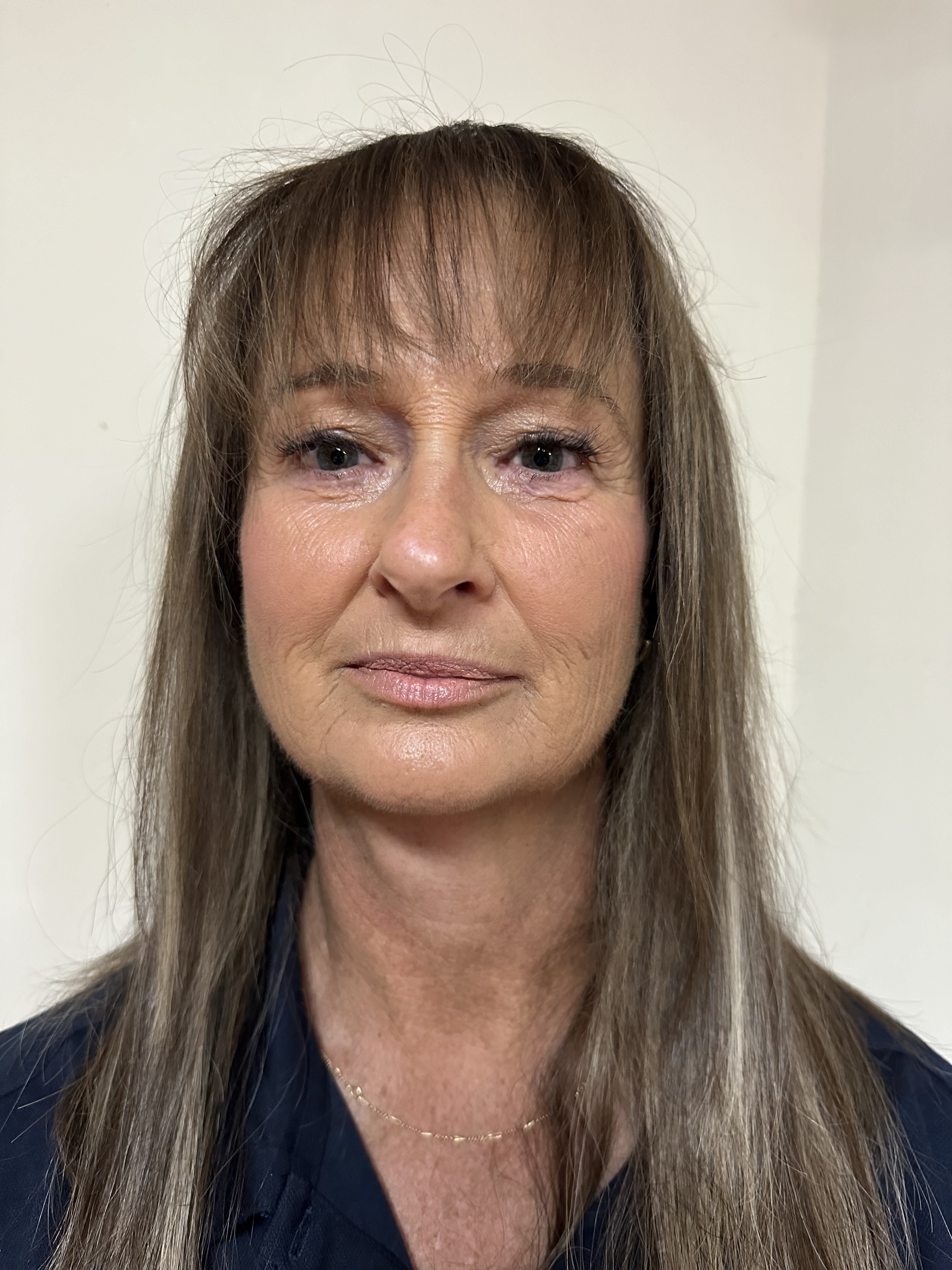
- 2016 Australian Paralympic team portrait

Personal information
- Born: 23 May 1972 (age 54)

Sport
- Country: Australia
- Sport: Para-equestrian

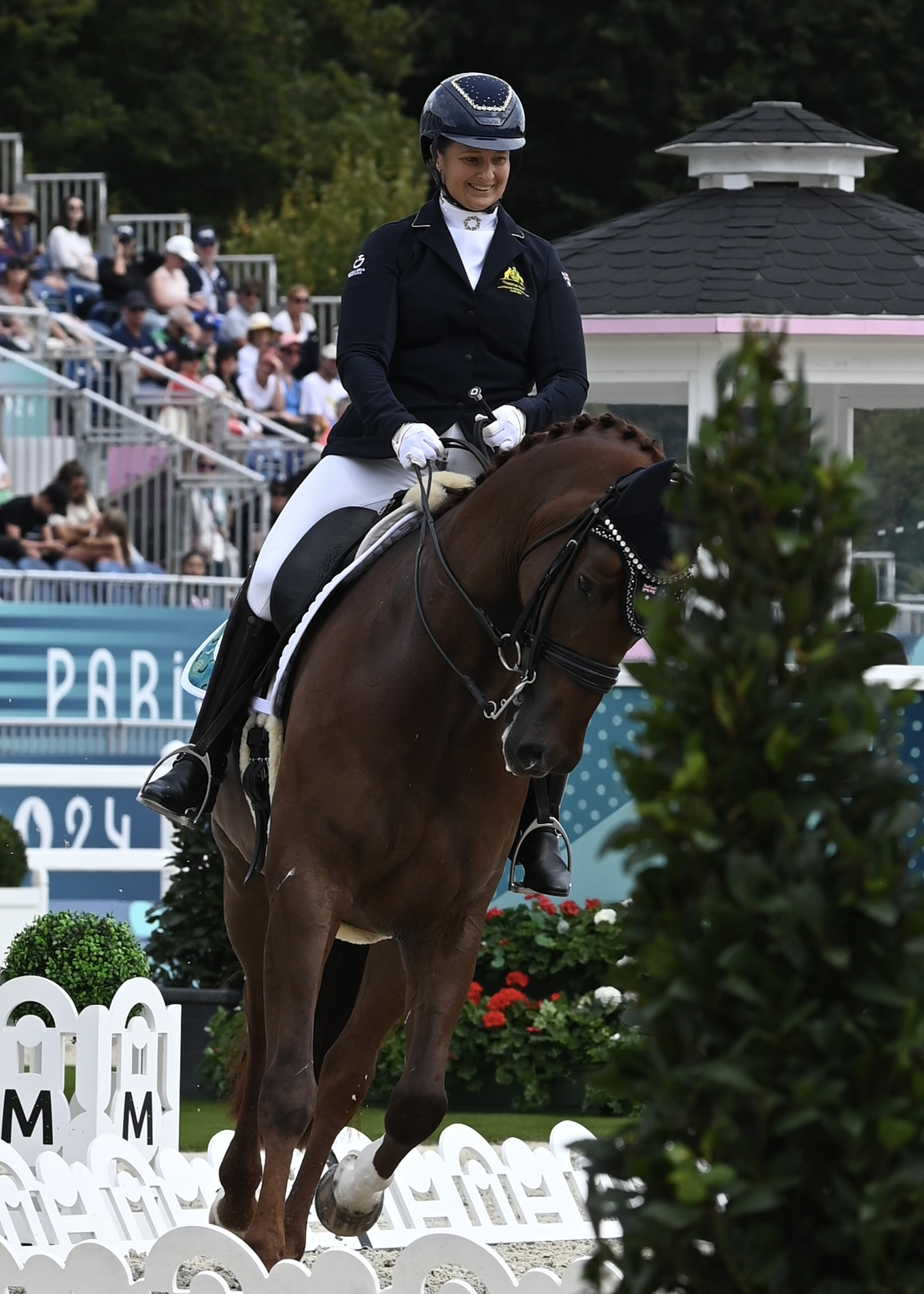
At the 2024 Summer Paralympics in Paris

Lisa Martin (born 23 May 1972) is an Australian para-equestrian. She represented Australia at the 2016 Rio Paralympics and the 2024 Paris Paralympics.

== Personal ==
Martin was born on 23 May 1972. She grew up in Scone, New South Wales. At the age of 28, a horse riding accident led to her fibula splitting and crushing into the bottom of her foot and a fall six weeks later caused further damage to her leg. After 20 operations in two years, her ankle was fused and her achillies tendon cut, she has less than 15 per cent movement in her ankle joint.

Martin in December 2019 was injured when her horse First Famous fell and landed on top of her and this resulted in multiple fractures to her pelvis, pubic bone and spine. She underwent two operations, which included inserting steel plates across her sacrum, spine and pelvis. In February 2022, she experienced heart problems while in Germany and after returning to Australia it was discovered she had sustained a heart attack. and spent time in hospital.

She works as a dressage trainer and instructor. Martin is married to Jason and they have a daughter Jess.

== Equestrian ==
Martin's heritage is in the equestrian world as she grew up in a family of Australian Stock Horse breeders in Scone. In her youth, she competed in eventing, polocrosse, showjumping and dressage and trained under the guidance of Rozzie and Olympian Heath Ryan. Fourteen years after the accident, she was approached to consider riding in para-equestrian events. Initially, Martin declined the offer to compete against people in a wheelchair. Martin was then told that wasn't the way paras worked, and was told the classifications and explained how they did work. Martin is now classified as a Grade V rider. Although she still competes in able bodied events, Martin said para-equestrian has become very professional. She continued on by saying there's a lot of support and the people involved are "incredible to deal with".

At the 2016 Rio Paralympics, she rode First Famous, a German Warmblood mare. She finished fourth in three events - the Individual Championship Test Grade IV, Dressage individual Team Test Grade IV and Individual Freestyle Test Grade IV and was a member of the Australian Team that finished ninth in the Team Competition.

At the 2022 World Championship in Herning, Denmark, she rode Juicy Wiggle and finished 10th in the individual test and 13th in the team test.

At the 2024 Paris Paralympics, she finished 5th in Individual championship test grade V and 6th in the Dressage individual team test grade V. She was a member of the Australian team that finished 12th in the Team event.

In 2024, she is a New South Wales Institute of Sport scholarship athlete.
