= Lee Frawley =

American Paralympic eqhestrian

Personal information
- Full name: Lee Frawley
- Born: 26 August 1954 (age 71) Saint Thomas, US Virgin Islands

Sport
- Country: United States Virgin Islands
- Sport: Equestrian

Achievements and titles
- Paralympic finals: 2012
Medal record
Representing United States Virgin Islands

Lee Frawley (born 26 August 1954) is a US Virgin Islander Paralympic equestrian. She made her debut in the 2012 Summer Paralympics in London. She is the first ever Paralympian to come from the US Virgin Islands.

Lee was born and raised in the US Virgin Islands, though she now lives in the United Kingdom.
