= Susanne Sunesen =

Danish para-equestrian

Susanne Jensby Sunesen (born 19 February 1977) is a Danish female para-equestrian competing at Individual Championship test, Individual Freestyle test and Team test — grade III.

At the 2016 Summer Paralympics in Rio de Janeiro, Sunesen and her horse, the 18 year-old Danish Warmblood mare CSK's Que Faire, won a silver medal with the score 72.171 percent at the Individual Championship test grade III event.
