= Steffen Zeibig =

German equestrian

Steffen Zeibig (born 11 June 1977 in Dresden) is a disabled equestrian from Germany. He has been on three silver medal winning teams and won a bronze at the 2016 Summer Paralympics. He is part of the team that will represent Germany in Equestrian at the 2020 Summer Paralympics
