= Frank Hosmar =

Dutch Paralympic equestrian

Personal information
- Nationality: Dutch
- Born: 20 August 1968 (age 57) Hellendoorn, Netherlands
Medal record
Equestrian
Representing Netherlands
Paralympic Games
Silver medal – second place	2020 Tokyo	Team
Bronze medal – third place	2012 London	Individual freestyle test grade V
Bronze medal – third place	2012 London	Individual test grade V
Bronze medal – third place	2016 Rio de Janeiro	Individual freestyle test grade V
Bronze medal – third place	2016 Rio de Janeiro	Individual test grade V
Bronze medal – third place	2016 Rio de Janeiro	Team test grade V
Bronze medal – third place	2020 Tokyo	Individual test grade V

Frank Hosmar (born 20 August 1968) is a Dutch Paralympic equestrian. He is a bronze medalist at the 2012 Summer Paralympics and the 2016 Summer Paralympics. He won also various medals at the World Equestrian Games and gold medalist at the European Championships in 2015, 2017 and 2019.
