= Chronological summary of the 2024 Summer Paralympics =

This is a chronological summary of the major events of the 2024 Summer Paralympics in Paris and other venues around the host city. The opening ceremony was held on 28 August with competition beginning the following day. The last day of competition and the closing ceremony was held on 8 September.

The games included 549 events in 22 different sports, with no changes to the sports programme from the 2020 Summer Paralympics, however there were expansions for sports such as Badminton and Taekwondo.

== Calendar ==
The International Paralympic Committee approved the final schedule, and dates for the Summer Paralympic Games were released on 2 February 2023.

All times and dates use Central European Summer Time (UTC+2)

OC	Opening ceremony	●	Event competitions	1	Gold medal events	CC	Closing ceremony

August/September 2024		August				September								Events
August/September 2024		28th Wed	29th Thu	30th Fri	31st Sat	1st Sun	2nd Mon	3rd Tue	4th Wed	5th Thu	6th Fri	7th Sat	8th Sun	Events
Ceremonies		OC											CC	—
Boccia			●	●	●	2	6	●	●	3				11
Football 5-a-side						●	●	●		●		1		1
Goalball			●	●	●	●	●	●	●	2				2
Para archery			●	●	2	2	2	1	1	1				9
Para athletics				14	18	19	13	24	15	19	16	22	4	164
Para badminton			●	●	●	2	14							16
Para canoe											●	5	5	10
Para cycling	Road								19	6	4	5		34
Para cycling	Track		4	5	4	4								17
Para equestrian								3	2		1	5		11
Para judo										5	5	6		16
Para powerlifting									4	4	4	4	4	20
Para rowing				●	●	5								5
Para swimming			15	14	15	14	13	15	12	13	15	15		141
Para table tennis			●	2	5	3	●	1	3	5	5	7		31
Para taekwondo			3	4	3									10
Para triathlon							11							11
Shooting para sport				3	2	2	1	2	2	1				13
Sitting volleyball			●	●	●	●	●	●	●	●	1	1		2
Wheelchair basketball			●	●	●	●	●	●	●	●	●	1	1	2
Wheelchair fencing								4	4	2	4	2		16
Wheelchair rugby			●	●	●	●	1							1
Wheelchair tennis				●	●	●	●	●	1	2	2	1		6
Daily medal events		0	22	42	49	53	61	50	63	63	57	75	14	549
Cumulative total		0	22	64	113	166	227	277	340	403	460	535	549	549
August/September 2024		August				September								Events
August/September 2024		28th Wed	29th Thu	30th Fri	31st Sat	1st Sun	2nd Mon	3rd Tue	4th Wed	5th Thu	6th Fri	7th Sat	8th Sun	Events

== Medal table ==
* Host nation (France)

2024 Summer Paralympics medal table (Note: Although the IPC does not include Neutral Paralympic Athletes in the official medal tables, they are listed here for comparison purposes only.)
Rank	NPC	Gold	Silver	Bronze	Total
1	China	94	76	50	220
2	Great Britain	49	44	31	124
3	United States	36	42	27	105
4	Netherlands	27	17	12	56
–	Neutral Paralympic Athletes	26	22	23	71
5	Brazil	25	25	38	88
6	Italy	24	15	33	72
7	Ukraine	22	28	32	82
8	France*	19	28	28	75
9	Australia	18	17	27	62
10	Japan	14	10	17	41
11–85	Remaining NPCs	195	227	289	711
Totals (85 entries)		549	551	607	1,707

== Day-by-day summaries ==
=== Day 0 — Wednesday 28 August ===
28 August 2024 — detailed results

Opening ceremony

- The opening ceremony began at 20:00 CEST (UTC+2) and was held outside a traditional stadium setting for the first time, with the parade of nations conducted along the Champs-Élysées from the Arc de Triomphe to the Place de la Concorde, where the official protocol took place.

=== Day 1 — Thursday 29 August ===
29 August 2024 — summary table

Sport	Event	Gold medalist(s)			Silver medalist(s)		Bronze medalist(s)		Ref
Sport	Event	Competitor(s)	Team	Rec	Competitor(s)	Team	Competitor(s)	Team	Ref
Cycling (track)	Men's pursuit B	Tristan Bangma (Pilot: Patrick Bos)	Netherlands		Stephen Bate (Pilot: Christopher Latham)	Great Britain	Lorenzo Bernard (Pilot: Davide Plebani)	Italy	
Cycling (track)	Men's pursuit C1	Li Zhangyu	China		Liang Weicong	China	Ricardo Ten Argilés	Spain	
Cycling (track)	Women's pursuit C1–2–3	Wang Xiaomei	China	WR	Daphne Schrager	Great Britain	Flurina Rigling	Switzerland	
Cycling (track)	Women's time trial C4–5	Caroline Groot	Netherlands		Marie Patouillet	France	Kate O'Brien	Canada	
Swimming	Men's 50 metre freestyle S10	Thomas Gallagher	Australia		Phelipe Rodrigues	Brazil	Rowan Crothers	Australia	
Swimming	Men's 50 metre breaststroke SB3	Takayuki Suzuki	Japan		Efrem Morelli	Italy	Miguel Luque Ávila	Spain	
Swimming	Women's 50 metre freestyle S6	Jiang Yuyan	China	PR	Elizabeth Marks	United States	Anna Hontar	Ukraine	
Swimming	Women's 50 metre freestyle S10	Chen Yi	China	WR	Christie Raleigh Crossley	United States	Aurélie Rivard	Canada	
Swimming	Men's 100 metre backstroke S1	Kamil Otowski	Poland		Anton Kol	Ukraine	Francesco Bettella	Italy	
Swimming	Men's 100 metre backstroke S2	Gabriel Araújo	Brazil		Vladimir Danilenko	Neutral Paralympic Athletes	Alberto Abarza	Chile	
Swimming	Men's 100 metre butterfly S13	Ihar Boki	Neutral Paralympic Athletes		Alex Portal	France	Enrique José Alhambra Mollar	Spain	
Swimming	Men's 100 metre butterfly S14	Alexander Hillhouse	Denmark	PR	William Ellard	Great Britain	Gabriel Bandeira	Brazil	
Swimming	Women's 100 metre backstroke S2	Yip Pin Xiu	Singapore		Haideé Aceves	Mexico	Angela Procida	Italy	
Swimming	Women's 100 metre butterfly S13	Carlotta Gilli	Italy		Grace Nuhfer	United States	Muslima Odilova	Uzbekistan	
Swimming	Women's 100 metre butterfly S14	Poppy Maskill	Great Britain	WR	Chan Yui-lam	Hong Kong	Valeriia Shabalina	Neutral Paralympic Athletes	
Swimming	Men's 200 metre freestyle S5	Francesco Bocciardo	Italy	PR	Kirill Pulver	Neutral Paralympic Athletes	Oleksandr Komarov	Ukraine	
Swimming	Women's 200 metre freestyle S5	Tully Kearney	Great Britain		Iryna Poida	Ukraine	Monica Boggioni	Italy	
Swimming	Men's 400 metre freestyle S9	Ugo Didier	France		Simone Barlaam	Italy	Brenden Hall	Australia	
Swimming	Women's 400 metre freestyle S9	Zsófia Konkoly	Hungary		Lakeisha Patterson	Australia	Vittoria Bianco	Italy	
Taekwondo	Men's 58 kg	Asaf Yasur	Israel		Alican Özcan	Turkey	Sabir Zeynalov	Azerbaijan	
Taekwondo	Men's 58 kg	Asaf Yasur	Israel		Alican Özcan	Turkey	Xiao Xiang-wen	Chinese Taipei	
Taekwondo	Women's 47 kg	Leonor Espinoza	Peru		Ziyodakhon Isakova	Uzbekistan	Khwansuda Phuangkitcha	Thailand	
Taekwondo	Women's 47 kg	Leonor Espinoza	Peru		Ziyodakhon Isakova	Uzbekistan	Zakia Khudadadi	Refugee Paralympic Team	
Taekwondo	Women's 52 kg	Surenjav Ulambayar	Mongolia		Zahra Rahimi	Iran	Ana Japaridze	Georgia	
Taekwondo	Women's 52 kg	Surenjav Ulambayar	Mongolia		Zahra Rahimi	Iran	Meryem Betül Çavdar	Turkey	

=== Day 2 — Friday 30 August ===
30 August 2024 — summary table

Sport	Event	Gold medalist(s)			Silver medalist(s)		Bronze medalist(s)		Ref
Sport	Event	Competitor(s)	Team	Rec	Competitor(s)	Team	Competitor(s)	Team	Ref
Athletics	Men's 100 metres T37	Ricardo Gomes de Mendonça	Brazil		Saptoyogo Purnomo	Indonesia	Andrey Vdovin	Neutral Paralympic Athletes	
Athletics	Men's 100 metres T47	Petrúcio Ferreira	Brazil		Korban Best	United States	Aymane El Haddaoui	Morocco	
Athletics	Women's 100 metres T35	Zhou Xia	China	WR	Guo Qianqian	China	Preethi Pal	India	
Athletics	Women's 200 metres T37	Wen Xiaoyan	China	PR	Nataliia Kobzar	Ukraine	Jiang Fenfen	China	
Athletics	Men's 400 metres T52	Maxime Carabin	Belgium		Tomoki Sato	Japan	Tomoya Ito	Japan	
Athletics	Men's 5000 metres T11	Júlio Cesar Agripino	Brazil	WR	Kenya Karasawa	Japan	Yeltsin Jacques	Brazil	
Athletics	Men's long jump T11	Di Dongdong	China	WR	Chen Shichang	China	Joan Munar	Spain	
Athletics	Women's long jump T11	Asila Mirzayorova	Uzbekistan	PR	Zhou Guohua	China	Alba García Falagán	Spain	
Athletics	Men's shot put F37	Kudratillokhon Marufkhujaev	Uzbekistan		Ahmed Ben Moslah	Tunisia	Tolibboy Yuldashev	Uzbekistan	
Athletics	Men's shot put F55	Ruzhdi Ruzhdi	Bulgaria		Zafar Zaker	Iran	Lech Stoltman	Poland	
Athletics	Men's shot put F55	Ruzhdi Ruzhdi	Bulgaria		Nebojša Đurić	Serbia	Lech Stoltman	Poland	
Athletics	Women's shot put F41	Raoua Tlili	Tunisia		Kubaro Khakimova	Uzbekistan	Antonella Ruiz Diaz	Argentina	
Athletics	Women's discus throw F55	Érica Castaño	Colombia		Dong Feixia	China	Rosa María Guerrero	Mexico	
Athletics	Men's javelin throw F38	José Lemos	Colombia	WR	Vladyslav Bilyi	Ukraine	An Dongquan	China	
Athletics	Women's club throw F32	Maroua Brahmi	Tunisia	WR	Parastoo Habibi	Iran	Giovanna Boscolo	Brazil	
Cycling (track)	Men's time trial C4–5	Korey Boddington	Australia		Blaine Hunt	Great Britain	Alfonso Cabello	Spain	
Cycling (track)	Men's pursuit C2	Alexandre Léauté	France		Ewoud Vromant	Belgium	Matthew Robertson	Great Britain	
Cycling (track)	Men's pursuit C3	Jaco van Gass	Great Britain		Finlay Graham	Great Britain	Alexandre Hayward	Canada	
Cycling (track)	Women's time trial B	Elizabeth Jordan (Pilot: Dannielle Khan)	Great Britain		Jessica Gallagher (Pilot: Caitlin Ward)	Australia	Sophie Unwin (Pilot: Jenny Holl)	Great Britain	
Cycling (track)	Women's pursuit C4	Emily Petricola	Australia		Anna Taylor	New Zealand	Keely Shaw	Canada	
Shooting	P1 Men's 10 metre air pistol SH1	Jo Jeong-du	South Korea		Manish Narwal	India	Yang Chao	China	
Shooting	R2 Women's 10 metre air rifle standing SH1	Avani Lekhara	India	PR	Lee Yun-ri	South Korea	Mona Agarwal	India	
Shooting	R4 Mixed 10 metre air rifle standing SH2	Franček Gorazd Tiršek	Slovenia	PR	Tanguy de La Forest	France	Seo Hun-tae	South Korea	
Swimming	Men's 100 metre freestyle S4	Ami Omer Dadaon	Israel		Takayuki Suzuki	Japan	Ángel de Jesús Camacho Ramírez	Mexico	
Swimming	Men's 100 metre freestyle S5	Oleksandr Komarov	Ukraine	PR	Guo Jincheng	China	Kirill Pulver	Neutral Paralympic Athletes	
Swimming	Men's 100 metre backstroke S13	Ihar Boki	Neutral Paralympic Athletes		Vladimir Sotnikov	Neutral Paralympic Athletes	Alex Portal	France	
Swimming	Men's 100 metre breaststroke SB8	Andrei Kalina	Neutral Paralympic Athletes		Yang Guanglong	China	Carlos Serrano Zárate	Colombia	
Swimming	Men's 100 metre breaststroke SB9	Stefano Raimondi	Italy		Hector Denayer	France	Maurice Wetekam	Germany	
Swimming	Women's 100 metre freestyle S5	Tully Kearney	Great Britain		Iryna Poida	Ukraine	Monica Boggioni	Italy	
Swimming	Women's 100 metre backstroke S13	Gia Pergolini	United States		Róisín Ní Ríain	Ireland	Carlotta Gilli	Italy	
Swimming	Women's 100 metre breaststroke SB8	Anastasiya Dmytriv	Spain		Brock Whiston	Great Britain	Viktoriia Ishchiulova	Neutral Paralympic Athletes	
Swimming	Women's 100 metre breaststroke SB9	Chantalle Zijderveld	Netherlands		Zhang Meng	China	Lisa Kruger	Netherlands	
Swimming	Men's 200 metre individual medley SM6	Yang Hong	China	WR	Nelson Crispín	Colombia	Talisson Glock	Brazil	
Swimming	Women's 200 metre individual medley SM6	Maisie Summers-Newton	Great Britain		Elizabeth Marks	United States	Liu Daomin	China	
Swimming	Men's 400 metre freestyle S11	David Kratochvíl	Czech Republic		Rogier Dorsman	Netherlands	Uchu Tomita	Japan	
Swimming	Women's 400 metre freestyle S11	Liesette Bruinsma	Netherlands		Zhang Xiaotong	China	Daria Lukianenko	Neutral Paralympic Athletes	
Swimming	Mixed 4 × 50 metre freestyle relay 20pts	Peng Qiuping; Yuan Weiyi; Jiang Yuyan; Guo Jincheng; He Shenggao; Lu Dong; Wang Lichao	China	WR	Leanne Smith; Abbas Karimi; Zachary Shattuck; Elizabeth Marks	United States	Patrícia Pereira; Lídia Vieira da Cruz; Daniel Xavier Mendes; Talisson Glock; Samuel da Silva	Brazil	
Table tennis	Women's doubles WD5	Liu Jing; Xue Juan	China		Seo Su-yeon; Yoon Ji-yu	South Korea	Cátia Oliveira; Joyce Oliveira	Brazil	
Table tennis	Women's doubles WD5	Liu Jing; Xue Juan	China		Seo Su-yeon; Yoon Ji-yu	South Korea	Dararat Asayut; Chilchitparyak Bootwansirina	Thailand	
Table tennis	Women's doubles WD14 (Note: Bronze medalist(s) determined on the previous day.)	Huang Wenjuan; Jin Yucheng	China		Stephanie Grebe; Juliane Wolf	Germany	Aida Dahlen; Merethe Tveiten	Norway	
Table tennis	Women's doubles WD14	Huang Wenjuan; Jin Yucheng	China		Stephanie Grebe; Juliane Wolf	Germany	Felicity Pickard; Bly Twomey	Great Britain	
Taekwondo	Men's 63 kg	Mahmut Bozteke	Turkey		Ganbatyn Bolor-Erdene	Mongolia	Antonino Bossolo	Italy	
Taekwondo	Men's 63 kg	Mahmut Bozteke	Turkey		Ganbatyn Bolor-Erdene	Mongolia	Ayoub Adouich	Morocco	
Taekwondo	Men's 70 kg	Imamaddin Khalilov	Azerbaijan		Fatih Çelik	Turkey	Juan Diego García López	Mexico	
Taekwondo	Men's 70 kg	Imamaddin Khalilov	Azerbaijan		Fatih Çelik	Turkey	Juan Samorano	Argentina	
Taekwondo	Women's 57 kg	Li Yujie	China		Gamze Gürdal	Turkey	Palesha Goverdhan	Nepal	
Taekwondo	Women's 57 kg	Li Yujie	China		Gamze Gürdal	Turkey	Silvana Fernandes	Brazil	
Taekwondo	Women's 65 kg	Ana Carolina Silva de Moura	Brazil		Djélika Diallo	France	Lisa Gjessing	Denmark	
Taekwondo	Women's 65 kg	Ana Carolina Silva de Moura	Brazil		Djélika Diallo	France	Christina Gkentzou	Greece	

=== Day 3 — Saturday 31 August ===
31 August 2024 — summary table

Sport	Event	Gold medalist(s)			Silver medalist(s)		Bronze medalist(s)		Ref
Sport	Event	Competitor(s)	Team	Rec	Competitor(s)	Team	Competitor(s)	Team	Ref
Archery	Women's individual W1	Chen Minyi	China		Šárka Musilová	Czech Republic	Tereza Brandtlová	Czech Republic	
Archery	Women's individual compound open	Öznur Cüre	Turkey		Fatemeh Hemmati	Iran	Jodie Grinham	Great Britain	
Athletics	Men's 100 metres T12	Noah Malone	United States		Joeferson Marinho de Oliveira	Brazil	Zac Shaw	Great Britain	
Athletics	Men's 100 metres T38	Jaydin Blackwell	United States	WR	Ryan Medrano	United States	Juan Campas	Colombia	
Athletics	Women's 100 metres T38	Karen Palomeque	Colombia	WR	Lida-Maria Manthopoulou	Greece	Darian Faisury Jiménez	Colombia	
Athletics	Women's 400 metres T11	Lahja Ishitile	Namibia	PR	Thalita Simplício	Brazil	He Shanshan	China	
Athletics	Women's 400 metres T47	Fernanda Yara da Silva	Brazil		Lisbeli Vera Andrade	Venezuela	Maria Clara Augusto	Brazil	
Athletics	Women's 1500 metres T13	Tigist Mengistu	Ethiopia		Fatima Ezzahra El Idrissi	Morocco	Liza Corso	United States	
Athletics	Men's 1500 metres T46	Aleksandr Iaremchuk	Neutral Paralympic Athletes		Michael Roeger	Australia	Antoine Praud	France	
Athletics	Men's 5000 metres T13	Yassine Ouhdadi	Spain		Aleksandr Kostin	Neutral Paralympic Athletes	Anton Kuliatin	Neutral Paralympic Athletes	
Athletics	Men's 5000 metres T54	Daniel Romanchuk	United States		Marcel Hug	Switzerland	Faisal Alrajehi	Kuwait	
Athletics	Women's 5000 metres T54	Catherine Debrunner	Switzerland	PR	Susannah Scaroni	United States	Madison de Rozario	Australia	
Athletics	Men's long jump T63	Joel de Jong	Netherlands	WR	Daniel Jørgensen	Denmark	Noah Mbuyamba	Netherlands	
Athletics	Women's long jump T64	Fleur Jong	Netherlands	PR	Marlene van Gansewinkel	Netherlands	Beatriz Hatz	United States	
Athletics	Men's shot put F12	Elbek Sultonov	Uzbekistan		Volodymyr Ponomarenko	Ukraine	Roman Danyliuk	Ukraine	
Athletics	Women's shot put F37	Li Yingli	China	PR	Mi Na	China	Irina Vertinskaya	Neutral Paralympic Athletes	
Athletics	Women's discus throw F57	Nassima Saifi	Algeria	PR	Xu Mian	China	Mokhigul Khamdamova	Uzbekistan	
Athletics	Women's javelin throw F13	Zhao Yuping	China	WR	Anna Kulinich-Sorokina	Neutral Paralympic Athletes	Natalija Eder	Austria	
Athletics	Men's javelin throw F57	Yorkinbek Odilov	Uzbekistan		Muhammet Khalvandi	Turkey	Cícero Valdiran Lins Nobre	Brazil	
Athletics	Men's club throw F32	Aleksei Churkin	Neutral Paralympic Athletes		Athanasios Konstantinidis	Greece	Ahmed Mehideb	Algeria	
Cycling (track)	Men's time trial C1–3	Li Zhangyu	China		Liang Weicong	China	Alexandre Léauté	France	
Cycling (track)	Men's pursuit C4	Jozef Metelka	Slovakia		Archie Atkinson	Great Britain	Gatien Le Rousseau	France	
Cycling (track)	Men's pursuit C5	Dorian Foulon	France		Yehor Dementyev	Ukraine	Elouan Gardon	United States	
Cycling (track)	Women's time trial C1–3	Amanda Reid	Australia		Qian Wangwei	China	Maike Hausberger	Germany	
Shooting	R1 Men's 10 metre air rifle standing SH1	Park Jin-ho	South Korea	PR	Yerkin Gabbasov	Kazakhstan	Martin Black Jørgensen	Denmark	
Shooting	P2 Women's 10 metre air pistol SH1	Sareh Javanmardi	Iran		Aysel Özgan	Turkey	Rubina Francis	India	
Swimming	Men's 50 metre freestyle S11	Keiichi Kimura	Japan		Hua Dongdong	China	Not awarded		
Swimming	Men's 50 metre freestyle S11	Keiichi Kimura	Japan		Wendell Belarmino Pereira	Brazil	Not awarded		
Swimming	Men's 50 metre backstroke S1	Kamil Otowski	Poland		Francesco Bettella	Italy	Anton Kol	Ukraine	
Swimming	Men's 50 metre backstroke S2	Gabriel Araújo	Brazil		Vladimir Danilenko	Neutral Paralympic Athletes	Alberto Abarza	Chile	
Swimming	Women's 50 metre freestyle S11	Ma Jia	China	WR	Karolina Pelendritou	Cyprus	Maryna Piddubna	Ukraine	
Swimming	Women's 50 metre backstroke S2	Yip Pin Xiu	Singapore		Haideé Aceves	Mexico	Teresa Perales	Spain	
Swimming	Men's 100 metre backstroke S8	Iñigo Llopis Sanz	Spain		Kota Kubota	Japan	Mark Malyar	Israel	
Swimming	Men's 100 metre backstroke S12	Stephen Clegg	Great Britain	WR	Raman Salei	Azerbaijan	Iaroslav Denysenko	Ukraine	
Swimming	Women's 100 metre backstroke S8	Alice Tai	Great Britain	PR	Viktoriia Ishchiulova	Neutral Paralympic Athletes	Mira Jeanne Maack	Germany	
Swimming	Women's 100 metre backstroke S12	Maria Carolina Gomes Santiago	Brazil		Anna Stetsenko	Ukraine	María Delgado	Spain	
Swimming	Men's 200 metre freestyle S14	William Ellard	Great Britain	WR	Nicholas Bennett	Canada	Jack Ireland	Australia	
Swimming	Men's 200 metre individual medley SM7	Iñaki Basiloff	Argentina		Andrii Trusov	Ukraine	Ievgenii Bogodaiko	Ukraine	
Swimming	Women's 200 metre freestyle S14	Valeriia Shabalina	Neutral Paralympic Athletes		Poppy Maskill	Great Britain	Louise Fiddes	Great Britain	
Swimming	Women's 200 metre individual medley SM7	Mallory Weggemann	United States	PR	Tess Routliffe	Canada	Julia Gaffney	United States	
Swimming	Men's 400 metre freestyle S13	Ihar Boki	Neutral Paralympic Athletes		Alex Portal	France	Kylian Portal	France	
Swimming	Women's 400 metre freestyle S13	Olivia Chambers	United States		Carlotta Gilli	Italy	Anna Stetsenko	Ukraine	
Table tennis	Men's doubles MD4	Peter Lovaš; Ján Riapoš	Slovakia		Jang Yeong-jin; Park Sung-joo	South Korea	Cha Soo-yong; Park Jin-cheol	South Korea	
Table tennis	Men's doubles MD4	Peter Lovaš; Ján Riapoš	Slovakia		Jang Yeong-jin; Park Sung-joo	South Korea	Fabien Lamirault; Julien Michaud	France	
Table tennis	Men's doubles MD8	Cao Ningning; Feng Panfeng	China		Valentin Baus; Thomas Schmidberger	Germany	Abdullah Öztürk; Nesim Turan	Turkey	
Table tennis	Men's doubles MD8	Cao Ningning; Feng Panfeng	China		Valentin Baus; Thomas Schmidberger	Germany	Wanchai Chaiwut; Yuttajak Glinbancheun	Thailand	
Table tennis	Women's doubles WD10	Gu Xiaodan; Pan Jiamin	China		Nada Matić; Borislava Perić	Serbia	Kang Oe-jeong; Lee Mi-gyu	South Korea	
Table tennis	Women's doubles WD10	Gu Xiaodan; Pan Jiamin	China		Nada Matić; Borislava Perić	Serbia	Jung Young-a; Moon Sung-hye	South Korea	
Table tennis	Women's doubles WD20	Lei Lina; Yang Qian	Australia		Lin Tzu-yu; Tien Shiau-wen	Chinese Taipei	Natalia Partyka; Karolina Pęk	Poland	
Table tennis	Women's doubles WD20	Lei Lina; Yang Qian	Australia		Lin Tzu-yu; Tien Shiau-wen	Chinese Taipei	Bruna Alexandre; Danielle Rauen	Brazil	
Table tennis	Mixed doubles XD17	Zhao Shuai; Mao Jingdian	China		Peng Weinan; Xiong Guiyan	China	Piotr Grudzień; Karolina Pęk	Poland	
Table tennis	Mixed doubles XD17	Zhao Shuai; Mao Jingdian	China		Peng Weinan; Xiong Guiyan	China	Viktor Didukh; Iryna Shynkarova	Ukraine	
Taekwondo	Men's 80 kg	Asadbek Toshtemirov	Uzbekistan		Luis Mario Nájera	Mexico	Alireza Bakht	Iran	
Taekwondo	Men's 80 kg	Asadbek Toshtemirov	Uzbekistan		Luis Mario Nájera	Mexico	Joo Jeong-hun	South Korea	
Taekwondo	Men's +80 kg	Matt Bush	Great Britain		Aliaskhab Ramazanov	Neutral Paralympic Athletes	Evan Medell	United States	
Taekwondo	Men's +80 kg	Matt Bush	Great Britain		Aliaskhab Ramazanov	Neutral Paralympic Athletes	Hamed Haghshenas	Iran	
Taekwondo	Women's +65 kg	Amy Truesdale	Great Britain		Guljonoy Naimova	Uzbekistan	Eleni Papastamatopoulou	Greece	
Taekwondo	Women's +65 kg	Amy Truesdale	Great Britain		Guljonoy Naimova	Uzbekistan	Rajae Akermach	Morocco	

=== Day 4 — Sunday 1 September ===
1 September 2024 — summary table

Sport	Event	Gold medalist(s)			Silver medalist(s)		Bronze medalist(s)		Ref
Sport	Event	Competitor(s)	Team	Rec	Competitor(s)	Team	Competitor(s)	Team	Ref
Archery	Men's individual W1	Jason Tabansky	United States		Han Guifei	China	Zhang Tianxin	China	
Archery	Men's individual compound open	Matt Stutzman	United States		Ai Xinliang	China	He Zihao	China	
Athletics	Men's 100 metres T13	Skander Djamil Athmani	Algeria	PR	Salum Ageze Kashafali	Norway	Shuta Kawakami	Japan	
Athletics	Women's 100 metres T34	Hannah Cockroft	Great Britain		Kare Adenegan	Great Britain	Lan Hanyu	China	
Athletics	Men's 100 metres T44	Mpumelelo Mhlongo	South Africa		Yamel Luis Vives Suares	Cuba	Eddy Bernard	Malaysia	
Athletics	Women's 200 metres T35	Zhou Xia	China		Guo Qianqian	China	Preethi Pal	India	
Athletics	Women's 200 metres T36	Shi Yiting	China	PR	Danielle Aitchison	New Zealand	Mali Lovell	Australia	
Athletics	Men's 400 metres T11	Enderson German Santos Gonzalez	Venezuela		Timothée Adolphe	France	Guillaume Junior Atangana	Refugee Paralympic Team	
Athletics	Men's 400 metres T53	Pongsakorn Paeyo	Thailand		Brent Lakatos	Canada	Brian Siemann	United States	
Athletics	Men's 400 metres T54	Dai Yunqiang	China	PR	Athiwat Paeng-nuea	Thailand	Daniel Romanchuk	United States	
Athletics	Women's 800 metres T53	Catherine Debrunner	Switzerland	PR	Sammi Kinghorn	Great Britain	Zhou Hongzhuan	China	
Athletics	Women's 800 metres T54	Manuela Schär	Switzerland	PR	Zhou Zhaoqian	China	Susannah Scaroni	United States	
Athletics	Men's high jump T47	Roderick Townsend-Roberts	United States		Nishad Kumar	India	Georgii Margiev	Neutral Paralympic Athletes	
Athletics	Women's long jump T12	Oksana Zubkovska	Ukraine		Sara Martínez	Spain	Lynda Hamri	Algeria	
Athletics	Women's long jump T37	Wen Xiaoyan	China	PR	Jaleen Roberts	United States	Manon Genest	France	
Athletics	Men's shot put F40	Miguel Monteiro	Portugal	PR	Battulga Tsegmid	Mongolia	Garrah Tnaiash	Iraq	
Athletics	Men's shot put F53	Giga Ochkhikidze	Georgia	WR	Abdelillah Gani	Morocco	Alireza Mokhtari	Iran	
Athletics	Women's shot put F20	Sabrina Fortune	Great Britain	WR	Gloria Agblemagnon	France	Poleth Méndes	Ecuador	
Athletics	Men's discus throw F52	Rigivan Ganeshamoorthy	Italy	WR	Aigars Apinis	Latvia	André Rocha	Brazil	
Athletics	Women's discus throw F64	Yang Yue	China		Yao Juan	China	Osiris Aneth Machado	Mexico	
Athletics	Women's javelin throw F34	Zou Lijuan	China	WR	Zuo Caiyun	China	Dayna Crees	Australia	
Badminton	Men's doubles WH1–WH2	Mai Jianpeng; Qu Zimo	China		Jeong Jae-gun; Yu Soo-young	South Korea	Daiki Kajiwara; Hiroshi Murayama	Japan	
Badminton	Women's doubles WH1–WH2	Liu Yutong; Yin Menglu	China		Sarina Satomi; Yuma Yamazaki	Japan	Sujirat Pookkham; Amnouy Wetwithan	Thailand	
Boccia	Men's individual BC2	Worawut Saengampa	Thailand		Muhammad Bintang Satria Herlangga	Indonesia	Watcharaphon Vongsa	Thailand	
Boccia	Women's individual BC2	Cristina Gonçalves	Portugal		Jeong So-yeong	South Korea	Gischa Zayana	Indonesia	
Cycling (track)	Men's time trial B	James Ball (Pilot: Steffan Lloyd)	Great Britain		Neil Fachie (Pilot: Matt Rotherham)	Great Britain	Thomas Ulbricht (Pilot: Robert Förstemann)	Germany	
Cycling (track)	Women's pursuit B	Sophie Unwin (Pilot: Jenny Holl)	Great Britain		Katie-George Dunlevy (Pilot: Eve McCrystal)	Ireland	Lora Fachie (Pilot: Corrine Hall)	Great Britain	
Cycling (track)	Women's pursuit C5	Marie Patouillet	France		Heïdi Gaugain	France	Nicole Murray	New Zealand	
Cycling (track)	Mixed team sprint C1–5	Kadeena Cox; Jaco van Gass; Jody Cundy	Great Britain		Ricardo Ten Argilés; Pablo Jaramillo Gallardo; Alfonso Cabello	Spain	Gordon Allan; Alistair Donohoe; Korey Boddington	Australia	
Rowing	PR1 men's single sculls	Benjamin Pritchard	Great Britain		Roman Polianskyi	Ukraine	Erik Horrie	Australia	
Rowing	PR1 women's single sculls	Moran Samuel	Israel		Birgit Skarstein	Norway	Nathalie Benoit	France	
Rowing	PR2 mixed double sculls	Lauren Rowles; Gregg Stevenson	Great Britain		Liu Shuang; Jiang Jijian	China	Shahar Milfelder; Saleh Shahin	Israel	
Rowing	PR3 mixed double sculls	Nikki Ayers; Jed Altschwager	Australia		Sam Murray; Annabel Caddick	Great Britain	Jan Helmich; Hermine Krumbein	Germany	
Rowing	PR3 mixed coxed four	Francesca Allen; Giedrė Rakauskaitė; Josh O'Brien; Ed Fuller; Erin Kennedy	Great Britain		Skylar Dahl; Gemma Wollenschlaeger; Alex Flynn; Ben Washburne; Emelie Eldracher	United States	Candyce Chafa; Rémy Taranto; Grégoire Bireau; Margot Boulet; Émilie Acquistapace	France	
Shooting	R3 Mixed 10 metre air rifle prone SH1	Veronika Vadovičová	Slovakia	PR	Radoslav Malenovský	Slovakia	Juan Antonio Saavedra Reinaldo	Spain	
Shooting	R5 Mixed 10 metre air rifle prone SH2	Tanguy de La Forest	France		Alexandre Galgani	Brazil	Mika Mizuta	Japan	
Swimming	Men's 100 metre freestyle S10	Stefano Raimondi	Italy		Rowan Crothers	Australia	Thomas Gallagher	Australia	
Swimming	Men's 100 metre backstroke S11	Mykhailo Serbin	Ukraine	WR	David Kratochvíl	Czech Republic	Danylo Chufarov	Ukraine	
Swimming	Men's 100 metre breaststroke SB5	Leo McCrea	Switzerland		Antoni Ponce Bertran	Spain	Danylo Semenykhin	Ukraine	
Swimming	Men's 100 metre breaststroke SB6	Yang Hong	China	PR	Nelson Crispín	Colombia	Ievgenii Bogodaiko	Ukraine	
Swimming	Women's 100 metre freestyle S10	Emeline Pierre	France		Aurélie Rivard	Canada	Alessia Scortechini	Italy	
Swimming	Women's 100 metre backstroke S11	Cai Liwen	China		Li Guizhi	China	Daria Lukianenko	Neutral Paralympic Athletes	
Swimming	Women's 100 metre breaststroke SB5	Grace Harvey	Great Britain		Zhang Li	China	Anna Hontar	Ukraine	
Swimming	Women's 100 metre breaststroke SB6	Maisie Summers-Newton	Great Britain	PR	Liu Daomin	China	Ng Cheuk-yan	Hong Kong	
Swimming	Men's 150 metre individual medley SM3	Josia Topf	Germany		Ahmed Kelly	Australia	Grant Patterson	Australia	
Swimming	Men's 150 metre individual medley SM4	Roman Zhdanov	Neutral Paralympic Athletes		Ami Omer Dadaon	Israel	Ángel de Jesús Camacho Ramírez	Mexico	
Swimming	Women's 150 metre individual medley SM4	Tanja Scholz	Germany	PR	Nataliia Butkova	Neutral Paralympic Athletes	Lídia Vieira da Cruz	Brazil	
Swimming	Men's 200 metre individual medley SM8	Xu Haijiao	China		Yang Guanglong	China	Diogo Cancela	Portugal	
Swimming	Women's 200 metre individual medley SM8	Brock Whiston	Great Britain		Viktoriia Ishchiulova	Neutral Paralympic Athletes	Alice Tai	Great Britain	
Swimming	Mixed 4 x 100 metre freestyle relay S14	William Ellard; Rhys Darbey; Poppy Maskill; Olivia Newman-Baronius	Great Britain		Jack Ireland; Madeleine McTernan; Ruby Storm; Benjamin Hance	Australia	Arthur Xavier Ribeiro; Gabriel Bandeira; Beatriz Carneiro; Ana Karolina Soares	Brazil	
Table tennis	Men's doubles MD14	Liao Keli; Yan Shuo	China		Rungroj Thainiyom; Phisit Wangphonphathanasiri	Thailand	Paul Karabardak; Billy Shilton	Great Britain	
Table tennis	Men's doubles MD14	Liao Keli; Yan Shuo	China		Rungroj Thainiyom; Phisit Wangphonphathanasiri	Thailand	Clément Berthier; Esteban Herrault	France	
Table tennis	Men's doubles MD18	Patryk Chojnowski; Piotr Grudzień	Poland		Liu Chaodong; Zhao Yiqing	China	Luiz Manara; Claudio Massad	Brazil	
Table tennis	Men's doubles MD18	Patryk Chojnowski; Piotr Grudzień	Poland		Liu Chaodong; Zhao Yiqing	China	Lian Hao; Zhao Shuai	China	
Table tennis	Mixed doubles XD7	Feng Panfeng; Zhou Ying	China		Yuttajak Glinbancheun; Wijittra Jaion	Thailand	Florian Merrien; Flora Vautier	France	
Table tennis	Mixed doubles XD7	Feng Panfeng; Zhou Ying	China		Yuttajak Glinbancheun; Wijittra Jaion	Thailand	Zhai Xiang; Gu Xiaodan	China	

=== Day 5 — Monday 2 September ===
2 September 2024 — summary table

Sport	Event	Gold medalist(s)			Silver medalist(s)		Bronze medalist(s)		Ref
Sport	Event	Competitor(s)	Team	Rec	Competitor(s)	Team	Competitor(s)	Team	Ref
Archery	Mixed team W1	Chen Minyi; Zhang Tianxin	China		Šárka Musilová; David Drahonínský	Czech Republic	Daila Dameno; Paolo Tonon	Italy	
Archery	Mixed team compound	Jodie Grinham; Nathan MacQueen	Great Britain		Fatemeh Hemmati; Hadi Nori	Iran	Sheetal Devi; Rakesh Kumar	India	
Athletics	Men's 100 metres T34	Chaiwat Rattana	Thailand	PR	Walid Ktila	Tunisia	Austin Smeenk	Canada	
Athletics	Men's 100 metres T35	Ihor Tsvietov	Ukraine		Artem Kalashian	Neutral Paralympic Athletes	Dmitrii Safronov	Neutral Paralympic Athletes	
Athletics	Men's 100 metres T63	Ezra Frech	United States		Daniel Jørgensen	Denmark	Vinícius Gonçalves Rodrigues	Brazil	
Athletics	Men's 100 metres T64	Sherman Guity	Costa Rica	PR	Maxcel Amo Manu	Italy	Felix Streng	Germany	
Athletics	Women's 1500 metres T11	Yayesh Gate Tesfaw	Ethiopia	WR	He Shanshan	China	Louzanne Coetzee	South Africa	
Athletics	Men's long jump T12	Said Najafzade	Azerbaijan		Doniyor Saliev	Uzbekistan	Fernando Vázquez	Argentina	
Athletics	Men's long jump T36	Evgenii Torsunov	Neutral Paralympic Athletes	PR	Aser Mateus Almeida	Brazil	Oleksandr Lytvynenko	Ukraine	
Athletics	Men's shot put F11	Amirhossein Alipour Darbeid	Iran		Mahdi Olad	Iran	Álvaro del Amo Cano	Spain	
Athletics	Men's shot put F41	Bobirjon Omonov	Uzbekistan	PR	Niko Kappel	Germany	Huang Jun	China	
Athletics	Women's shot put F54	Gloria Zarza Guadarrama	Mexico		Elizabeth Rodrigues Gomes	Brazil	Nurkhon Kurbanova	Uzbekistan	
Athletics	Men's discus throw F56	Claudiney Batista	Brazil	PR	Yogesh Kathuniya	India	Konstantinos Tzounis	Greece	
Athletics	Women's discus throw F53	Elizabeth Rodrigues Gomes	Brazil	PR	Keiko Onidani	Japan	Zoia Ovsii	Ukraine	
Athletics	Men's javelin throw F64	Sumit Antil	India	PR	Dulan Kodithuwakku	Sri Lanka	Michal Burian	Australia	
Badminton	Men's singles WH1	Qu Zimo	China		Choi Jung-man	South Korea	Thomas Wandschneider	Germany	
Badminton	Men's singles WH2	Daiki Kajiwara	Japan		Chan Ho Yuen	Hong Kong	Kim Jung-jun	South Korea	
Badminton	Men's singles SL3	Kumar Nitesh	India		Daniel Bethell	Great Britain	Mongkhon Bunsun	Thailand	
Badminton	Men's singles SL4	Lucas Mazur	France		Suhas Lalinakere Yathiraj	India	Fredy Setiawan	Indonesia	
Badminton	Men's singles SU5	Cheah Liek Hou	Malaysia		Suryo Nugroho	Indonesia	Dheva Anrimusthi	Indonesia	
Badminton	Men's singles SH6	Charles Noakes	France		Krysten Coombs	Great Britain	Vitor Tavares	Brazil	
Badminton	Women's singles WH1	Sarina Satomi	Japan		Sujirat Pookkham	Thailand	Yin Menglu	China	
Badminton	Women's singles WH2	Liu Yutong	China		Li Hongyan	China	Ilaria Renggli	Switzerland	
Badminton	Women's singles SL3	Xiao Zuxian	China		Qonitah Ikhtiar Syakuroh	Indonesia	Mariam Eniola Bolaji	Nigeria	
Badminton	Women's singles SL4	Cheng Hefang	China		Leani Ratri Oktila	Indonesia	Helle Sofie Sagøy	Norway	
Badminton	Women's singles SU5	Yang Qiuxia	China		Thulasimathi Murugesan	India	Manisha Ramadass	India	
Badminton	Women's singles SH6	Li Fengmei	China		Lin Shuangbao	China	Nithya Sre Sivan	India	
Badminton	Mixed doubles SL3–SU5	Hikmat Ramdani; Leani Ratri Oktila	Indonesia		Fredy Setiawan; Khalimatus Sadiyah	Indonesia	Lucas Mazur; Faustine Noël	France	
Badminton	Mixed doubles SH6	Lin Naili; Li Fengmei	China		Miles Krajewski; Jayci Simon	United States	Subhan; Rina Marlina	Indonesia	
Boccia	Men's individual BC1	John Loung	Hong Kong		Jung Sung-joon	South Korea	Muhamad Syafa	Indonesia	
Boccia	Women's individual BC1	Aurélie Aubert	France		Jeralyn Tan	Singapore	Hiromi Endo	Japan	
Boccia	Men's individual BC3	Jeong Ho-won	South Korea		Daniel Michel	Australia	Grigorios Polychronidis	Greece	
Boccia	Women's individual BC3	Ho Yuen Kei	Hong Kong		Jamieson Leeson	Australia	Kang Sun-hee	South Korea	
Boccia	Men's individual BC4	Stephen McGuire	Great Britain		Edilson Chica	Colombia	Artem Kolinko	Ukraine	
Boccia	Women's individual BC4	Lin Ximei	China		Cheung Yuen	Hong Kong	Leidy Chica	Colombia	
Paratriathlon	Men's PTS2	Jules Ribstein	France		Mohamed Lahna	United States	Mark Barr	United States	
Paratriathlon	Women's PTS2	Hailey Danz	United States		Veronica Yoko Plebani	Italy	Allysa Seely	United States	
Paratriathlon	Men's PTS3	Daniel Molina	Spain		Max Gelhaar	Germany	Nico van der Burgt	Netherlands	
Paratriathlon	Men's PTS4	Alexis Hanquinquant	France		Carson Clough	United States	Nil Riudavets	Spain	
Paratriathlon	Women's PTS4	Megan Richter	Great Britain		Marta Francés Gómez	Spain	Hannah Moore	Great Britain	
Paratriathlon	Men's PTS5	Chris Hammer	United States		Ronan Cordeiro	Brazil	Martin Schulz	Germany	
Paratriathlon	Women's PTS5	Grace Norman	United States		Claire Cashmore	Great Britain	Lauren Steadman	Great Britain	
Paratriathlon	Men's PTWC	Jetze Plat	Netherlands		Florian Brungraber	Austria	Geert Schipper	Netherlands	
Paratriathlon	Women's PTWC	Lauren Parker	Australia		Kendall Gretsch	United States	Leanne Taylor	Canada	
Paratriathlon	Men's PTVI	Dave Ellis	Great Britain		Thibaut Rigaudeau	France	Antoine Perel	France	
Paratriathlon	Women's PTVI	Susana Rodríguez	Spain		Francesca Tarantello	Italy	Anja Renner	Germany	
Shooting	P3 Mixed 25 metre pistol SH1	Yang Chao	China	PR	Yan Xiao Gong	United States	Kim Jung-nam	South Korea	
Swimming	Men's 50 metre freestyle S9	Simone Barlaam	Italy	WR	Denis Tarasov	Neutral Paralympic Athletes	Fredrik Solberg	Norway	
Swimming	Men's 50 metre freestyle S13	Ihar Boki	Neutral Paralympic Athletes		Illia Yaremenko	Ukraine	Oleksii Virchenko	Ukraine	
Swimming	Men's 50 metre backstroke S3	Denys Ostapchenko	Ukraine		Josia Topf	Germany	Serhii Palamarchuk	Ukraine	
Swimming	Women's 50 metre freestyle S13	Maria Carolina Gomes Santiago	Brazil		Gia Pergolini	United States	Carlotta Gilli	Italy	
Swimming	Women's 50 metre backstroke S3	Ellie Challis	Great Britain		Zoia Shchurova	Neutral Paralympic Athletes	Marta Fernández Infante	Spain	
Swimming	Men's 100 metre breaststroke SB4	Dmitrii Cherniaev	Neutral Paralympic Athletes		Antonios Tsapatakis	Greece	Manuel Mateo Bortuzzo	Italy	
Swimming	Men's 100 metre breaststroke SB14	Nicholas Bennett	Canada		Jake Michel	Australia	Naohide Yamaguchi	Japan	
Swimming	Women's 100 metre breaststroke SB4	Giulia Ghiretti	Italy		Fanni Illés	Hungary	Cheng Jiao	China	
Swimming	Women's 100 metre breaststroke SB14	Louise Fiddes	Great Britain		Débora Carneiro	Brazil	Beatriz Carneiro	Brazil	
Swimming	Men's 200 metre freestyle S2	Gabriel Araújo	Brazil		Vladimir Danilenko	Neutral Paralympic Athletes	Alberto Abarza	Chile	
Swimming	Men's 400 metre freestyle S7	Federico Bicelli	Italy		Andrii Trusov	Ukraine	Iñaki Basiloff	Argentina	
Swimming	Women's 400 metre freestyle S7	Morgan Stickney	United States	PR	McKenzie Coan	United States	Giulia Terzi	Italy	
Swimming	Mixed 4 × 100 metre medley relay 34pts	Jesse Aungles; Timothy Hodge; Emily Beecroft; Alexa Leary; Callum Simpson; Keira Stephens	Australia	PR	Olivier van de Voort; Chantalle Zijderveld; Florianne Bultje; Thijs van Hofweegen	Netherlands	Núria Marquès; Oscar Salguero Galisteo; Iñigo Llopis Sanz; Sarai Gascón Moreno; Anastasiya Dmytriv; José Antonio Mari	Spain	
Wheelchair rugby	Mixed open	Daisuke Ikezaki; Ryuji Kusaba; Yukinobu Ike; Hitoshi Ogawa; Hidefumi Wakayama; Yuki Hasegawa; Kae Kurahashi; Masayuki Haga; Shinichi Shimakawa; Shunya Nakamachi; Seiya Norimatsu; Katsuya Hashimoto	Japan		Sarah Adam; Chuck Aoki; Clayton Brackett; Jeff Butler; Lee Fredette; Brad Hudspeth; Chuck Melton; Eric Newby; Josh O'Neill; Zion Redington; Mason Symons; Josh Wheeler	United States	Ryley Batt; Chris Bond; Ben Fawcett; Brayden Foxley-Connolly; Andrew Edmondson; Shae Graham; Jake Howe; Josh Nicholson; James McQuillan; Emilie Miller; Ella Sabljak; Beau Vernon	Australia	

=== Day 6 — Tuesday 3 September ===
3 September 2024 — summary table

Sport	Event	Gold medalist(s)			Silver medalist(s)		Bronze medalist(s)		Ref
Sport	Event	Competitor(s)	Team	Rec	Competitor(s)	Team	Competitor(s)	Team	Ref
Archery	Women's individual recurve open	Wu Chunyan	China		Wu Yang	China	Elisabetta Mijno	Italy	
Athletics	Women's 100 metres T11	Jerusa Geber dos Santos	Brazil		Liu Cuiqing	China	Lorena Salvatini Spoladore	Brazil	
Athletics	Women's 100 metres T13	Lamiya Valiyeva	Azerbaijan	WR	Rayane Soares da Silva	Brazil	Orla Comerford	Ireland	
Athletics	Women's 100 metres T47	Kiara Rodríguez	Ecuador		Brittni Mason	United States	Anna Grimaldi	New Zealand	
Athletics	Men's 200 metres T51	Cody Fournie	Canada		Toni Piispanen	Finland	Peter Genyn	Belgium	
Athletics	Women's 200 metres T64	Kimberly Alkemade	Netherlands	PR	Marlene van Gansewinkel	Netherlands	Irmgard Bensusan	Germany	
Athletics	Men's 400 metres T20	Jhon Obando	Colombia		David José Pineda Mejía	Spain	Yovanni Philippe	Mauritius	
Athletics	Men's 400 metres T36	James Turner	Australia	WR	William Stedman	New Zealand	Alexis Chávez	Argentina	
Athletics	Men's 400 metres T38	Jaydin Blackwell	United States	WR	Ryan Medrano	United States	Juan Campas	Colombia	
Athletics	Women's 400 metres T12	Omara Durand	Cuba		Hajar Safarzadeh	Iran	Oksana Boturchuk	Ukraine	
Athletics	Women's 400 metres T20	Yuliia Shuliar	Ukraine		Aysel Önder	Turkey	Deepthi Jeevanji	India	
Athletics	Women's 400 metres T37	Nataliia Kobzar	Ukraine		Jiang Fenfen	China	Viktoriia Slanova	Neutral Paralympic Athletes	
Athletics	Men's 1500 metres T11	Yeltsin Jacques	Brazil	WR	Yitayal Silesh Yigzaw	Ethiopia	Júlio Cesar Agripino	Brazil	
Athletics	Men's 1500 metres T13	Aleksandr Kostin	Neutral Paralympic Athletes	PR	Rouay Jebabli	Tunisia	Anton Kuliatin	Neutral Paralympic Athletes	
Athletics	Men's 1500 metres T54	Jin Hua	China		Marcel Hug	Switzerland	Dai Yunqiang	China	
Athletics	Women's 1500 metres T54	Catherine Debrunner	Switzerland	PR	Sammi Kinghorn	Great Britain	Susannah Scaroni	United States	
Athletics	Men's high jump T63	Ezra Frech	United States	PR	Sharad Kumar	India	Mariyappan Thangavelu	India	
Athletics	Men's long jump T37	Brian Lionel Impellizzeri	Argentina		Samson Opiyo	Kenya	Mateus Evangelista Cardoso	Brazil	
Athletics	Men's long jump T47	Robiel Yankiel Sol Cervantes	Cuba		Wang Hao	China	Nikita Kotukov	Neutral Paralympic Athletes	
Athletics	Men's shot put F20	Oleksandr Yarovyi	Ukraine	WR	Muhammad Ziyad Zolkefli	Malaysia	Maksym Koval	Ukraine	
Athletics	Men's shot put F32	Athanasios Konstantinidis	Greece		Aleksei Churkin	Neutral Paralympic Athletes	Lazaros Stefanidis	Greece	
Athletics	Women's shot put F34	Zou Lijuan	China		Lucyna Kornobys	Poland	Saida Amoudi	Morocco	
Athletics	Women's discus throw F11	Zhang Liangmin	China		Assunta Legnante	Italy	Xue Enhui	China	
Athletics	Men's javelin throw F46	Guillermo Varona	Cuba		Ajeet Singh Yadav	India	Sundar Singh Gurjar	India	
Athletics	Women's javelin throw F56	Diāna Krumina	Latvia	PR	Raíssa Rocha Machado	Brazil	Lin Sitong	China	
Equestrian	Individual championship test Grade I	Rihards Snikus	Latvia		Roxanne Trunnell	United States	Sara Morganti	Italy	
Equestrian	Individual championship test Grade II	Fiona Howard	United States		Katrine Kristensen	Denmark	Georgia Wilson	Great Britain	
Equestrian	Individual championship test Grade III	Rebecca Hart	United States		Rixt van der Horst	Netherlands	Natasha Baker	Great Britain	
Shooting	R7 Men's 50 metre rifle 3 positions SH1	Park Jin-ho	South Korea	PR	Dong Chao	China	Marek Dobrowolski	Poland	
Shooting	R8 Women's 50 metre rifle 3 positions SH1	Natascha Hiltrop	Germany		Veronika Vadovičová	Slovakia	Zhang Cuiping	China	
Swimming	Men's 50 metre backstroke S5	Yuan Weiyi	China		Guo Jincheng	China	Wang Lichao	China	
Swimming	Men's 50 metre butterfly S6	Wang Jingang	China		Nelson Crispín	Colombia	Laurent Chardard	France	
Swimming	Women's 50 metre backstroke S5	Lu Dong	China		He Shenggao	China	Liu Yu	China	
Swimming	Women's 50 metre butterfly S6	Jiang Yuyan	China		Liu Daomin	China	Mayara Petzold	Brazil	
Swimming	Men's 100 metre backstroke S7	Yurii Shenhur	Ukraine		Andrii Trusov	Ukraine	Federico Bicelli	Italy	
Swimming	Men's 100 metre backstroke S9	Yahor Shchalkanau	Neutral Paralympic Athletes	PR	Ugo Didier	France	Bogdan Mozgovoi	Neutral Paralympic Athletes	
Swimming	Men's 100 metre butterfly S10	Stefano Raimondi	Italy		Ihor Nimchenko	Ukraine	Alex Saffy	Australia	
Swimming	Women's 100 metre freestyle S3	Leanne Smith	United States	PR	Marta Fernández Infante	Spain	Rachael Watson	Australia	
Swimming	Women's 100 metre backstroke S9	Christie Raleigh Crossley	United States	PR	Núria Marquès	Spain	Mariana Ribeiro	Brazil	
Swimming	Women's 100 metre butterfly S10	Faye Rogers	Great Britain		Callie-Ann Warrington	Great Britain	Katie Cosgriffe	Canada	
Swimming	Men's 200 metre freestyle S4	Ami Omer Dadaon	Israel		Roman Zhdanov	Neutral Paralympic Athletes	Takayuki Suzuki	Japan	
Swimming	Men's 200 metre individual medley SM11	Rogier Dorsman	Netherlands	PR	Danylo Chufarov	Ukraine	David Kratochvíl	Czech Republic	
Swimming	Men's 200 metre individual medley SM13	Ihar Boki	Neutral Paralympic Athletes	WR	Alex Portal	France	Vladimir Sotnikov	Neutral Paralympic Athletes	
Swimming	Women's 200 metre individual medley SM11	Daria Lukianenko	Neutral Paralympic Athletes	WR	Ma Jia	China	Cai Liwen	China	
Swimming	Women's 200 metre individual medley SM13	Carlotta Gilli	Italy		Olivia Chambers	United States	Róisín Ní Ríain	Ireland	
Table tennis	Men's individual C5	Tommy Urhaug	Norway		Cheng Ming-chih	Chinese Taipei	Ali Öztürk	Turkey	
Table tennis	Men's individual C5	Tommy Urhaug	Norway		Cheng Ming-chih	Chinese Taipei	Mitar Palikuća	Serbia	
Wheelchair fencing	Men's sabre A	Maurice Schmidt	Germany		Piers Gilliver	Great Britain	Edoardo Giordan	Italy	
Wheelchair fencing	Women's sabre A	Gu Haiyan	China		Kinga Dróżdż	Poland	Nino Tibilashvili	Georgia	
Wheelchair fencing	Men's sabre B	Feng Yanke	China		Michał Dąbrowski	Poland	Zhang Jie	China	
Wheelchair fencing	Women's sabre B	Saysunee Jana	Thailand		Xiao Rong	China	Olena Fedota	Ukraine	

=== Day 7 — Wednesday 4 September ===
4 September 2024 — summary table

Sport	Event	Gold medalist(s)			Silver medalist(s)		Bronze medalist(s)		Ref
Sport	Event	Competitor(s)	Team	Rec	Competitor(s)	Team	Competitor(s)	Team	Ref
Archery	Men's individual recurve open	Harvinder Singh	India		Łukasz Ciszek	Poland	Mohammad Reza Arab Ameri	Iran	
Athletics	Men's 100 metres T53	Abdulrahman Al-Qurashi	Saudi Arabia		Pongsakorn Paeyo	Thailand	Ariosvaldo Fernandes	Brazil	
Athletics	Men's 100 metres T54	Juan Pablo Cervantes García	Mexico		Athiwat Paeng-nuea	Thailand	Leo-Pekka Tähti	Finland	
Athletics	Women's 100 metres T36	Shi Yiting	China	PR	Danielle Aitchison	New Zealand	Verônica Hipólito	Brazil	
Athletics	Women's 100 metres T53	Sammi Kinghorn	Great Britain	PR	Catherine Debrunner	Switzerland	Gao Fang	China	
Athletics	Women's 100 metres T54	Léa Bayekula	Belgium	PR	Tatyana McFadden	United States	Amanda Kotaja	Finland	
Athletics	Men's 400 metres T37	Andrey Vdovin	Neutral Paralympic Athletes		Bartolomeu Chaves	Brazil	Amen Allah Tissaoui	Tunisia	
Athletics	Men's long jump T38	Khetag Khinchagov	Neutral Paralympic Athletes		Zhong Huanghao	China	José Lemos	Colombia	
Athletics	Men's long jump T64	Markus Rehm	Germany		Derek Loccident	United States	Jarryd Wallace	United States	
Athletics	Men's shot put F36	Vladimir Sviridov	Neutral Paralympic Athletes	WR	Alan Kokoity	Neutral Paralympic Athletes	Dastan Mukashbekov	Kazakhstan	
Athletics	Men's shot put F46	Greg Stewart	Canada		Sachin Sarjerao Khilari	India	Luka Baković	Croatia	
Athletics	Women's shot put F32	Anastasiia Moskalenko	Ukraine	WR	Wanna Brito	Brazil	Evgeniia Galaktionova	Neutral Paralympic Athletes	
Athletics	Women's shot put F46	Noelle Malkamaki	United States	WR	Mariia Shpatkivska	Ukraine	Holly Robinson	New Zealand	
Athletics	Women's discus throw F41	Raoua Tlili	Tunisia		Youssra Karim	Morocco	Estefany López	Ecuador	
Athletics	Men's javelin throw F34	Saeid Afrooz	Iran	WR	Mauricio Valencia	Colombia	Diego Meneses	Colombia	
Athletics	Men's club throw F51	Dharambir Nain	India		Pranav Soorma	India	Željko Dimitrijević	Serbia	
Cycling (road)	Men's time trial H1	Fabrizio Cornegliani	Italy		Maxime Hordies	Belgium	Pieter du Preez	South Africa	
Cycling (road)	Men's time trial H2	Sergio Garrote Muñoz	Spain		Luca Mazzone	Italy	Florian Jouanny	France	
Cycling (road)	Men's time trial H3	Mathieu Bosredon	France		Johan Quaile	France	Martino Pini	Italy	
Cycling (road)	Men's time trial H4	Jetze Plat	Netherlands		Thomas Frühwirth	Austria	Jonas van de Steene	Belgium	
Cycling (road)	Men's time trial H5	Mitch Valize	Netherlands		Loïc Vergnaud	France	Luis Costa	Portugal	
Cycling (road)	Men's time trial C1	Ricardo Ten Argilés	Spain		Michael Teuber	Germany	Zbigniew Maciejewski	Poland	
Cycling (road)	Men's time trial C2	Alexandre Léauté	France		Ewoud Vromant	Belgium	Darren Hicks	Australia	
Cycling (road)	Men's time trial C3	Thomas Peyroton-Dartet	France		Eduardo Santas	Spain	Matthias Schindler	Germany	
Cycling (road)	Men's time trial C4	Kévin Le Cunff	France		Gatien Le Rousseau	France	Damián Ramos Sánchez	Spain	
Cycling (road)	Men's time trial C5	Daniel Abraham	Netherlands		Alistair Donohoe	Australia	Dorian Foulon	France	
Cycling (road)	Men's time trial B	Tristan Bangma (Pilot: Patrick Bos)	Netherlands		Elie de Carvalho (Pilot: Mickael Guichard)	France	Vincent ter Schure (Pilot: Timo Fransen)	Netherlands	
Cycling (road)	Men's time trial T1–2	Chen Jianxin	China		Nathan Clement	Canada	Tim Celen	Belgium	
Cycling (road)	Women's time trial H1–3	Katerina Brim	United States		Lauren Parker	Australia	Annika Zeyen	Germany	
Cycling (road)	Women's time trial H4–5	Oksana Masters	United States		Chantal Haenen	Netherlands	Sun Bianbian	China	
Cycling (road)	Women's time trial C1–3	Maike Hausberger	Germany		Fran Brown	Great Britain	Anna Beck	Sweden	
Cycling (road)	Women's time trial C4	Samantha Bosco	United States		Meg Lemon	Australia	Franziska Matile-Dörig	Switzerland	
Cycling (road)	Women's time trial C5	Sarah Storey	Great Britain		Heïdi Gaugain	France	Alana Forster	Australia	
Cycling (road)	Women's time trial B	Katie-George Dunlevy (Pilot: Linda Kelly)	Ireland		Sophie Unwin (Pilot: Jenny Holl)	Great Britain	Lora Fachie (Pilot: Corrine Hall)	Great Britain	
Cycling (road)	Women's time trial T1–2	Marieke van Soest	Netherlands		Celine van Till	Switzerland	Emma Lund	Denmark	
Equestrian	Individual championship test Grade IV	Demi Haerkens	Netherlands		Sanne Voets	Netherlands	Anna-Lena Niehues	Germany	
Equestrian	Individual championship test Grade V	Michèle George	Belgium		Regine Mispelkamp	Germany	Sophie Wells	Great Britain	
Powerlifting	Men's 49 kg	Omar Qarada	Jordan		Abdullah Kayapinar	Turkey	Lê Văn Công	Vietnam	
Powerlifting	Men's 54 kg	David Degtyarev	Kazakhstan		Pablo Ramírez Barrientos	Cuba	Yang Jinglang	China	
Powerlifting	Women's 41 kg	Cui Zhe	China	PR	Esther Nworgu	Nigeria	Lara Aparecida de Lima	Brazil	
Powerlifting	Women's 45 kg	Guo Lingling	China	WR	Zoe Newson	Great Britain	Nazmiye Muslu Muratlı	Turkey	
Shooting	P4 Mixed 50 metre pistol SH1	Yang Chao	China	PR	Server Ibragimov	Uzbekistan	Davide Franceschetti	Italy	
Shooting	R9 Mixed 50 metre rifle prone SH2	Dragan Ristić	Serbia		Vladimer Tchintcharauli	Georgia	Tim Jeffery	Great Britain	
Swimming	Men's 50 metre freestyle S7	Andrii Trusov	Ukraine	WR	Carlos Serrano Zárate	Colombia	Egor Efrosinin	Neutral Paralympic Athletes	
Swimming	Men's 50 metre breaststroke SB2	José Arnulfo Castorena	Mexico		Ismail Barlov	Bosnia and Herzegovina	Grant Patterson	Australia	
Swimming	Women's 50 metre breaststroke SB3	Monica Boggioni	Italy	PR	Patrícia Pereira	Brazil	Marta Fernández Infante	Spain	
Swimming	Men's 100 metre freestyle S12	Iaroslav Denysenko	Ukraine		Maksym Veraksa	Ukraine	Raman Salei	Azerbaijan	
Swimming	Women's 100 metre freestyle S7	Jiang Yuyan	China	WR	Morgan Stickney	United States	Giulia Terzi	Italy	
Swimming	Women's 100 metre freestyle S9	Alexa Leary	Australia	WR	Christie Raleigh Crossley	United States	Mariana Ribeiro	Brazil	
Swimming	Women's 100 metre freestyle S12	Maria Carolina Gomes Santiago	Brazil		Anna Stetsenko	Ukraine	Ayano Tsujiuchi	Japan	
Swimming	Men's 200 metre individual medley SM14	Nicholas Bennett	Canada	PR	Rhys Darbey	Great Britain	Ricky Betar	Australia	
Swimming	Women's 200 metre individual medley SM14	Valeriia Shabalina	Neutral Paralympic Athletes		Poppy Maskill	Great Britain	Aira Kinoshita	Japan	
Swimming	Men's 400 metre freestyle S8	Alberto Amodeo	Italy		Reid Maxwell	Canada	Andrei Nikolaev	Neutral Paralympic Athletes	
Swimming	Women's 400 metre freestyle S8	Jessica Long	United States		Alice Tai	Great Britain	Xenia Palazzo	Italy	
Swimming	Mixed 4 x 100 metre freestyle relay 49pts	Maryna Piddubna; Oleksii Virchenko; Anna Stetsenko; Iaroslav Denysenko	Ukraine		Matheus Rheine; Douglas Matera; Lucilene da Silva Sousa; Carol Santiago	Brazil	José Ramón Cantero Elvira; María Delgado; Emma Feliu Martin; Enrique José Alhambra Mollar	Spain	
Table tennis	Women's individual C5	Zhang Bian	China		Pan Jiamin	China	Moon Sung-hye	South Korea	
Table tennis	Women's individual C5	Zhang Bian	China		Pan Jiamin	China	Jung Young-a	South Korea	
Table tennis	Men's individual C10	Patryk Chojnowski	Poland		Lian Hao	China	Filip Radović	Montenegro	
Table tennis	Men's individual C10	Patryk Chojnowski	Poland		Lian Hao	China	Matéo Bohéas	France	
Table tennis	Women's individual C10	Yang Qian	Australia		Natalia Partyka	Poland	Bruna Alexandre	Brazil	
Table tennis	Women's individual C10	Yang Qian	Australia		Natalia Partyka	Poland	Tien Shiau-wen	Chinese Taipei	
Wheelchair fencing	Men's foil A	Sun Gang	China		Matteo Betti	Italy	Zhong Saichun	China	
Wheelchair fencing	Women's foil A	Zou Xufeng	China		Gu Haiyan	China	Judith Rodríguez Menéndez	Spain	
Wheelchair fencing	Men's foil B	Dimitri Coutya	Great Britain		Feng Yanke	China	Hu Daoliang	China	
Wheelchair fencing	Women's foil B	Saysunee Jana	Thailand		Xiao Rong	China	Beatrice Vio	Italy	
Wheelchair tennis	Quad doubles	Sam Schröder; Niels Vink	Netherlands		Andy Lapthorne; Gregory Slade	Great Britain	Donald Ramphadi; Lucas Sithole	South Africa	

=== Day 8 — Thursday 5 September ===
5 September 2024 — summary table

Sport	Event	Gold medalist(s)			Silver medalist(s)		Bronze medalist(s)		Ref
Sport	Event	Competitor(s)	Team	Rec	Competitor(s)	Team	Competitor(s)	Team	Ref
Archery	Mixed team recurve	Elisabetta Mijno; Stefano Travisani	Italy		Merve Nur Eroğlu; Sadık Savaş	Turkey	Živa Lavrinc; Dejan Fabčič	Slovenia	
Athletics	Men's 100 metres T11	Athanasios Ghavelas	Greece		Timothée Adolphe	France	Di Dongdong	China	
Athletics	Women's 100 metres T12	Omara Durand	Cuba		Oksana Boturchuk	Ukraine	Katrin Mueller-Rottgardt	Germany	
Athletics	Women's 100 metres T37	Wen Xiaoyan	China	PR	Taylor Swanson	United States	Jaleen Roberts	United States	
Athletics	Men's 400 metres T12	Mouncef Bouja	Morocco		Noah Malone	United States	Rouay Jebabli	Tunisia	
Athletics	Men's 400 metres T13	Skander Djamil Athmani	Algeria		Ryota Fukunaga	Japan	Buinder Bermúdez	Colombia	
Athletics	Women's 400 metres T53	Catherine Debrunner	Switzerland	PR	Sammi Kinghorn	Great Britain	Zhou Hongzhuan	China	
Athletics	Women's 400 metres T54	Léa Bayekula	Belgium		Manuela Schär	Switzerland	Zhou Zhaoqian	China	
Athletics	Men's 800 metres T53	Brent Lakatos	Canada		Pongsakorn Paeyo	Thailand	Brian Siemann	United States	
Athletics	Men's 800 metres T54	Jin Hua	China	PR	Dai Yunqiang	China	Marcel Hug	Switzerland	
Athletics	Women's long jump T38	Luca Ekler	Hungary		Nele Moos	Germany	Karen Palomeque	Colombia	
Athletics	Women's long jump T63	Vanessa Low	Australia	WR	Martina Caironi	Italy	Elena Kratter	Switzerland	
Athletics	Men's shot put F35	Khusniddin Norbekov	Uzbekistan	PR	Hernán Emanuel Urra	Argentina	Seyed Aliasghar Javanmardi	Iran	
Athletics	Women's shot put F33	Wu Qing	China	PR	Gilda Guadalupe Cota Vera	Mexico	Svetlana Krivenok	Neutral Paralympic Athletes	
Athletics	Women's shot put F35	Mariia Pomazan	Ukraine		Wang Jun	China	Anna Nicholson	Great Britain	
Athletics	Women's shot put F57	Safia Djelal	Algeria	PR	Xu Mian	China	Nassima Saifi	Algeria	
Athletics	Women's shot put F64	Yao Juan	China		Arelle Middleton	United States	Yang Yue	China	
Athletics	Men's discus throw F11	Oney Tapia	Italy		Hassan Bajoulvand	Iran	Álvaro del Amo Cano	Spain	
Athletics	Men's discus throw F64	Jeremy Campbell	United States	PR	Akeem Stewart	Trinidad and Tobago	David Blair	United States	
Athletics	Men's javelin throw F13	Dan Pembroke	Great Britain	WR	Ali Pirouj	Iran	Ulicer Aguilera Cruz	Cuba	
Boccia	Pairs BC3	Ho Yuen Kei; Tse Tak Wah	Hong Kong		Jeong Ho-won; Kang Sun-hee	South Korea	Stefanía Ferrando; Rodrigo Romero	Argentina	
Boccia	Pairs BC4	Leidy Chica; Edilson Chica	Colombia		Cheung Yuen; Leung Yuk Wing	Hong Kong	Pornchok Larpyen; Nuanchan Phonsila	Thailand	
Boccia	Mixed team BC1–BC2	Lan Zhijian; Yan Zhiqiang; Zhang Qi	China		Muhamad Afrizal Syafa; Felix Ardi Yudha; Gischa Zayana	Indonesia	Hiromi Endo; Takayuki Hirose; Hidetaka Sugimura	Japan	
Cycling (road)	Men's road race H1–2	Florian Jouanny	France		Sergio Garrote Muñoz	Spain	Luca Mazzone	Italy	
Cycling (road)	Men's road race H3	Mathieu Bosredon	France		Johan Quaile	France	Mirko Testa	Italy	
Cycling (road)	Men's road race H4	Jetze Plat	Netherlands		Thomas Frühwirth	Austria	Rafał Wilk	Poland	
Cycling (road)	Men's road race H5	Mitch Valize	Netherlands		Loïc Vergnaud	France	Pavlo Bal	Ukraine	
Cycling (road)	Women's road race H1–4	Lauren Parker	Australia		Jennette Jansen	Netherlands	Annika Zeyen	Germany	
Cycling (road)	Women's road race H5	Oksana Masters	United States		Sun Bianbian	China	Ana Maria Vitelaru	Italy	
Goalball	Men's	Yuto Sano; Haruki Torii; Yuji Taguchi; Naoki Hagiwara; Kazuya Kaneko; Koji Miyajiki	Japan		Vasyl Oliinyk; Anton Strelchyk; Fedir Sydorenko; Yevheniy Tsyhanenko; Rodion Zhyhalin; Oleksandr Toporkov	Ukraine	André Cláudio Botelho Dantas; Emerson Ernesto; Josemárcio Sousa; Leomon Moreno; Paulo Rubens Ferreira Saturnino; Romário Diego Marques	Brazil	
Goalball	Women's	Fatma Gül Güler; Reyhan Yılmaz; Sevda Altunoluk; Şeydanur Kaplan; Sevtap Altunoluk; Berfin Altan	Turkey		Elham Mahamid Ruzin; Noa Malka; Gal Hamrani; Or Mizrahi; Roni Ohayon; Lihi Ben-David	Israel	Zhang Xiling; Cao Zhenhua; Xu Miao; Wang Chunyan; Ke Peiying; Wang Chunhua	China	
Judo	Men's -60 kg J1	Abdelkader Bouamer	Algeria		Meysam Banitaba	Iran	Marcos Blanco	Venezuela	
Judo	Men's -60 kg J1	Abdelkader Bouamer	Algeria		Meysam Banitaba	Iran	Kapil Parmar	India	
Judo	Men's -60 kg J2	Sherzod Namozov	Uzbekistan		Zurab Zurabiani	Georgia	Ishak Ouldkouider	Algeria	
Judo	Men's -60 kg J2	Sherzod Namozov	Uzbekistan		Zurab Zurabiani	Georgia	Davyd Khorava	Ukraine	
Judo	Women's -48 kg J1	Nataliya Nikolaychyk	Ukraine		Shizuka Hangai	Japan	Rosicleide Silva	Brazil	
Judo	Women's -48 kg J1	Nataliya Nikolaychyk	Ukraine		Shizuka Hangai	Japan	Ecem Taşın	Turkey	
Judo	Women's -48 kg J2	Akmaral Nauatbek	Kazakhstan		Sandrine Martinet	France	Li Liqing	China	
Judo	Women's -48 kg J2	Akmaral Nauatbek	Kazakhstan		Sandrine Martinet	France	Cahide Eke	Turkey	
Judo	Women's -57 kg J1	Shi Yijie	China		Maria Liana Mutia	United States	Anzhela Havrysiuk	Ukraine	
Judo	Women's -57 kg J1	Shi Yijie	China		Maria Liana Mutia	United States	Paula Gómez	Argentina	
Powerlifting	Men's 59 kg	Mohamed Elmenyawy	Egypt		Qi Yongkai	China	Mohsen Bakhtiar	Iran	
Powerlifting	Men's 65 kg	Zou Yi	China		Mark Swan	Great Britain	Hocine Bettir	Algeria	
Powerlifting	Women's 50 kg	Clara Fuentes Monasterio	Venezuela	PR	Xiao Jinping	China	Olivia Broome	Great Britain	
Powerlifting	Women's 55 kg	Rehab Ahmed	Egypt		Besra Duman	Turkey	Kamolpan Kraratpet	Thailand	
Shooting	R6 Mixed 50 metre rifle prone SH1	Natascha Hiltrop	Germany	PR	Anna Benson	Sweden	Jean-Louis Michaud	France	
Swimming	Men's 50 metre freestyle S5	Guo Jincheng	China	WR	Yuan Weiyi	China	Wang Lichao	China	
Swimming	Women's 50 metre freestyle S8	Alice Tai	Great Britain		Cecília Jerônimo de Araújo	Brazil	Viktoriia Ishchiulova	Neutral Paralympic Athletes	
Swimming	Men's 100 metre freestyle S6	Antonio Fantin	Italy	PR	Talisson Glock	Brazil	Laurent Chardard	France	
Swimming	Men's 100 metre breaststroke SB11	Rogier Dorsman	Netherlands		Yang Bozun	China	Danylo Chufarov	Ukraine	
Swimming	Men's 100 metre breaststroke SB13	Taliso Engel	Germany		Nurdaulet Zhumagali	Kazakhstan	Vali Israfilov	Azerbaijan	
Swimming	Women's 100 metre breaststroke SB7	Mariia Pavlova	Neutral Paralympic Athletes	WR	Iona Winnifrith	Great Britain	Tess Routliffe	Canada	
Swimming	Women's 100 metre breaststroke SB11	Daria Lukianenko	Neutral Paralympic Athletes	PR	Ma Jia	China	Karolina Pelendritou	Cyprus	
Swimming	Women's 100 metre breaststroke SB12	Elena Krawzow	Germany	WR	Maria Carolina Gomes Santiago	Brazil	Zheng Jietong	China	
Swimming	Women's 100 metre breaststroke SB13	Rebecca Redfern	Great Britain		Olivia Chambers	United States	Colleen Young	United States	
Swimming	Men's 200 metre individual medley SM9	Timothy Hodge	Australia	PR	Ugo Didier	France	Hector Denayer	France	
Swimming	Women's 200 metre individual medley SM9	Zsófia Konkoly	Hungary		Núria Marquès	Spain	Anastasiya Dmytriv	Spain	
Swimming	Women's 400 metre freestyle S10	Aurélie Rivard	Canada		Alexandra Truwit	United States	Bianka Pap	Hungary	
Swimming	Mixed 4 x 50 metre medley relay 20pts	Lu Dong; Zhang Li; Wang Lichao; Guo Jincheng; Jiang Yuyan; Wang Jingang; Yao Cuan; Zou Liankang	China	WR	Elizabeth Marks; Morgan Ray; Abbas Karimi; Leanne Smith	United States	Iaroslav Semenenko; Anna Hontar; Oleksandr Komarov; Iryna Poida; Veronika Korzhova; Denys Ostapchenko	Ukraine	
Table tennis	Men's individual C2	Rafał Czuper	Poland		Jiří Suchánek	Czech Republic	Cha Soo-yong	South Korea	
Table tennis	Men's individual C2	Rafał Czuper	Poland		Jiří Suchánek	Czech Republic	Fabien Lamirault	France	
Table tennis	Men's individual C3	Feng Panfeng	China		Thomas Schmidberger	Germany	Jang Yeong-jin	South Korea	
Table tennis	Men's individual C3	Feng Panfeng	China		Thomas Schmidberger	Germany	Yuttajak Glinbancheun	Thailand	
Table tennis	Men's individual C11	Kim Gi-tae	South Korea		Chen Po-yen	Chinese Taipei	Samuel Von Einem	Australia	
Table tennis	Men's individual C11	Kim Gi-tae	South Korea		Chen Po-yen	Chinese Taipei	Péter Pálos	Hungary	
Table tennis	Women's individual C7	Kelly van Zon	Netherlands		Kübra Öçsoy Korkut	Turkey	Wang Rui	China	
Table tennis	Women's individual C7	Kelly van Zon	Netherlands		Kübra Öçsoy Korkut	Turkey	Bly Twomey	Great Britain	
Table tennis	Women's individual C11	Natsuki Wada	Japan		Elena Prokofeva	Neutral Paralympic Athletes	Ebru Acer	Turkey	
Table tennis	Women's individual C11	Natsuki Wada	Japan		Elena Prokofeva	Neutral Paralympic Athletes	Kanami Furukawa	Japan	
Wheelchair fencing	Men's foil team	Sun Gang; Feng Yanke; Zhong Saichun; Tian Jianquan	China		Oliver Lam-Watson; Piers Gilliver; Dimitri Coutya	Great Britain	Ludovic Lemoine; Damien Tokatlian; Maxime Valet; Yohan Peter	France	
Wheelchair fencing	Women's foil team	Gu Haiyan; Xiao Rong; Zou Xufeng; Chen Yuandong	China		Éva Hajmási; Zsuzsanna Krajnyák; Boglárka Mező; Amarilla Veres	Hungary	Andreea Mogoș; Loredana Trigilia; Beatrice Vio; Rossana Pasquino	Italy	
Wheelchair tennis	Women's doubles	Yui Kamiji; Manami Tanaka	Japan		Diede de Groot; Aniek van Koot	Netherlands	Guo Luoyao; Wang Ziying	China	
Wheelchair tennis	Quad singles	Niels Vink	Netherlands		Sam Schröder	Netherlands	Guy Sasson	Israel	

=== Day 9 — Friday 6 September ===
6 September 2024 — summary table

Sport	Event	Gold medalist(s)			Silver medalist(s)		Bronze medalist(s)		Ref
Sport	Event	Competitor(s)	Team	Rec	Competitor(s)	Team	Competitor(s)	Team	Ref
Athletics	Men's 100 metres T51	Cody Fournie	Canada	PR	Peter Genyn	Belgium	Toni Piispanen	Finland	
Athletics	Men's 100 metres T52	Maxime Carabin	Belgium		Marcus Perrineau-Daley	Great Britain	Tomoki Sato	Japan	
Athletics	Women's 100 metres T64	Fleur Jong	Netherlands		Kimberly Alkemade	Netherlands	Marlene van Gansewinkel	Netherlands	
Athletics	Men's 400 metres T62	Hunter Woodhall	United States		Johannes Floors	Germany	Olivier Hendriks	Netherlands	
Athletics	Men's 1500 metres T20	Ben Sandilands	Great Britain	WR	Sandro Baessa	Portugal	Michael Brannigan	United States	
Athletics	Women's 1500 metres T20	Barbara Bieganowska-Zając	Poland		Liudmyla Danylina	Ukraine	Antônia Keyla	Brazil	
Athletics	Men's high jump T64	Praveen Kumar	India		Derek Loccident	United States	Temurbek Giyazov	Uzbekistan	
Athletics	Men's high jump T64	Praveen Kumar	India		Derek Loccident	United States	Maciej Lepiato	Poland	
Athletics	Women's long jump T20	Karolina Kucharczyk	Poland		Zileide Cassiano da Silva	Brazil	Fatma Damla Altın	Turkey	
Athletics	Women's long jump T47	Kiara Rodríguez	Ecuador	PR	Petra Luterán	Hungary	Bjørk Nørremark	Denmark	
Athletics	Men's shot put F57	Yasin Khosravi	Iran	PR	Thiago Paulino dos Santos	Brazil	Hokato Hotozhe Sema	India	
Athletics	Women's shot put F12	Assunta Legnante	Italy		Safiya Burkhanova	Uzbekistan	Zhao Yuping	China	
Athletics	Men's discus throw F37	Tolibboy Yuldashev	Uzbekistan		Jesse Zesseu	Canada	Haider Ali	Pakistan	
Athletics	Women's discus throw F38	Simoné Kruger	South Africa	PR	Li Yingli	China	Xiomara Saldarriaga	Colombia	
Athletics	Men's javelin throw F54	Ivan Revenko	Neutral Paralympic Athletes		Édgar Ulises Fuentes Yáñez	Mexico	Manolis Stefanoudakis	Greece	
Athletics	Women's javelin throw F46	Naibys Morillo	Venezuela	PR	Shahinakhon Yigitalieva	Uzbekistan	Hollie Arnold	Great Britain	
Athletics	Mixed 4 × 100 metres universal relay	Zhou Guohua; Wang Hao; Wen Xiaoyan; Hu Yang	China	WR	Zac Shaw; Jonnie Peacock; Ali Smith; Sammi Kinghorn	Great Britain	Noah Malone; Hunter Woodhall; Taylor Swanson; Tatyana McFadden; Korban Best	United States	
Cycling (road)	Men's road race C4–5	Yehor Dementyev	Ukraine		Kévin Le Cunff	France	Martin van de Pol	Netherlands	
Cycling (road)	Men's road race B	Tristan Bangma (Pilot: Patrick Bos)	Netherlands		Vincent ter Schure (Pilot: Timo Fransen)	Netherlands	Alexandre Lloveras (Pilot: Yoann Paillot)	France	
Cycling (road)	Women's road race C4–5	Sarah Storey	Great Britain		Heïdi Gaugain	France	Paula Ossa	Colombia	
Cycling (road)	Women's road race B	Sophie Unwin (Pilot: Jenny Holl)	Great Britain		Katie-George Dunlevy (Pilot: Linda Kelly)	Ireland	Lora Fachie (Pilot: Corrine Hall)	Great Britain	
Equestrian	Team open	Roxanne Trunnell; Fiona Howard; Rebecca Hart	United States		Sanne Voets; Demi Haerkens; Rixt van der Horst	Netherlands	Anna-Lena Niehues; Regine Mispelkamp; Heidemarie Dresing	Germany	
Judo	Men's -73 kg J1	Alex Bologa	Romania		Yergali Shamey	Kazakhstan	Lennart Sass	Germany	
Judo	Men's -73 kg J1	Alex Bologa	Romania		Yergali Shamey	Kazakhstan	Djibrilo Iafa	Portugal	
Judo	Men's -73 kg J2	Yujiro Seto	Japan		Giorgi Kaldani	Georgia	Uchkun Kuranbaev	Uzbekistan	
Judo	Men's -73 kg J2	Yujiro Seto	Japan		Giorgi Kaldani	Georgia	Osvaldas Bareikis	Lithuania	
Judo	Women's -57 kg J2	Junko Hirose	Japan		Kumushkhon Khodjaeva	Uzbekistan	Dayana Fedossova	Kazakhstan	
Judo	Women's -57 kg J2	Junko Hirose	Japan		Kumushkhon Khodjaeva	Uzbekistan	Marta Arce Payno	Spain	
Judo	Women's -70 kg J1	Liu Li	China		Brenda Souza	Brazil	Theodora Paschalidou	Greece	
Judo	Women's -70 kg J1	Liu Li	China		Brenda Souza	Brazil	Nicolina Pernheim	Sweden	
Judo	Women's -70 kg J2	Alana Maldonado	Brazil		Wang Yue	China	Kazusa Ogawa	Japan	
Judo	Women's -70 kg J2	Alana Maldonado	Brazil		Wang Yue	China	Ina Kaldani	Georgia	
Powerlifting	Men's 72 kg	Bonnie Bunyau Gustin	Malaysia	WR	Hu Peng	China	Donato Telesca	Italy	
Powerlifting	Men's 80 kg	Rouhollah Rostami	Iran	WR	Gu Xiaofei	China	Rasool Mohsin	Iraq	
Powerlifting	Women's 61 kg	Onyinyechi Mark	Nigeria		Cui Jianjin	China	Amalia Pérez	Mexico	
Powerlifting	Women's 67 kg	Tan Yujiao	China	WR	Fatma Elyan	Egypt	Maria de Fatima Costa de Castro	Brazil	
Sitting volleyball	Men's	Hamidreza Abbasifeshki; Morteza Mehrzad; Meisam Ali Pour; Davoud Alipourian; Meysam Hajibabaei Movahhed; Mohammed Nemati; Sadegh Bigdeli; Majid Lashkarisanami; Hossein Golestani; Isa Zirahi; Ramezan Salehihajikolaei; Mahdi Babadi	Iran		Safet Alibašić; Nizam Čančar; Stevan Crnobrnja; Sabahudin Delalić; Edin Dino; Mirzet Duran; Ismet Godinjak; Dževad Hamzić; Ermin Jusufović; Adnan Manko; Asim Medić; Armin Šehić	Bosnia and Herzegovina	Ashraf Zaghloul Abdelaziz Abdalla; Zakareia Abdo; Metawa Abouelkhir; Mohamed Abouelyazeid; Abdelnaby Hassan Ahmed Abdellatif; Hesham Elshwikh; Mohamed Hamdy Elsoudany; Ahmed Mohammed Fadl; Ahmed Mohammed Soliman Khamis; Hossam Massoud; Elsayed Moussa Saad Moussa; Ahmed Zikry	Egypt	
Swimming	Men's 50 metre freestyle S3	Umut Ünlü	Turkey		Denys Ostapchenko	Ukraine	Josia Topf	Germany	
Swimming	Men's 50 metre freestyle S4	Sebastian Massabie	Canada	WR	Takayuki Suzuki	Japan	Ami Omer Dadaon	Israel	
Swimming	Men's 50 metre butterfly S5	Guo Jincheng	China	WR	Yuan Weiyi	China	Wang Lichao	China	
Swimming	Women's 50 metre freestyle S4	Leanne Smith	United States	WR	Tanja Scholz	Germany	Rachael Watson	Australia	
Swimming	Women's 50 metre butterfly S5	Lu Dong	China	WR	He Shenggao	China	Sevilay Öztürk	Turkey	
Swimming	Men's 100 metre freestyle S8	Callum Simpson	Australia		Noah Jaffe	United States	Alberto Amodeo	Italy	
Swimming	Men's 100 metre backstroke S10	Olivier van de Voort	Netherlands		Stefano Raimondi	Italy	Thomas Gallagher	Australia	
Swimming	Men's 100 metre backstroke S14	Benjamin Hance	Australia		Gabriel Bandeira	Brazil	Mark Tompsett	Great Britain	
Swimming	Men's 100 metre butterfly S9	Simone Barlaam	Italy		Timothy Hodge	Australia	Lewis Bishop	Australia	
Swimming	Men's 100 metre butterfly S11	Keiichi Kimura	Japan	PR	Danylo Chufarov	Ukraine	Uchu Tomita	Japan	
Swimming	Women's 100 metre backstroke S10	Bianka Pap	Hungary		Alexandra Truwit	United States	Emeline Pierre	France	
Swimming	Women's 100 metre backstroke S14	Poppy Maskill	Great Britain		Valeriia Shabalina	Neutral Paralympic Athletes	Olivia Newman-Baronius	Great Britain	
Swimming	Women's 100 metre butterfly S9	Christie Raleigh Crossley	United States	PR	Zsófia Konkoly	Hungary	Emily Beecroft	Australia	
Swimming	Men's 400 metre freestyle S6	Talisson Glock	Brazil		Antonio Fantin	Italy	Jesús Alberto Gutiérrez Bermúdez	Mexico	
Swimming	Women's 400 metre freestyle S6	Jiang Yuyan	China		Nora Meister	Switzerland	Maisie Summers-Newton	Great Britain	
Table tennis	Men's individual C1 (Note: Bronze medalist(s) determined two days earlier. (Men's individual C1 on September 4))	Yunier Fernández	Cuba		Rob Davies	Great Britain	Federico Falco	Italy	
Table tennis	Men's individual C1	Yunier Fernández	Cuba		Rob Davies	Great Britain	Endre Major	Hungary	
Table tennis	Men's individual C6	Matteo Parenzan	Italy		Rungroj Thainiyom	Thailand	Peter Rosenmeier	Denmark	
Table tennis	Men's individual C6	Matteo Parenzan	Italy		Rungroj Thainiyom	Thailand	Ian Seidenfeld	United States	
Table tennis	Men's individual C7	Yan Shuo	China		Will Bayley	Great Britain	Jean Paul Montanus	Netherlands	
Table tennis	Men's individual C7	Yan Shuo	China		Will Bayley	Great Britain	Chalermpong Punpoo	Thailand	
Table tennis	Women's individual C1–2	Giada Rossi	Italy		Liu Jing	China	Seo Su-yeon	South Korea	
Table tennis	Women's individual C1–2	Giada Rossi	Italy		Liu Jing	China	Dorota Bucław	Poland	
Table tennis	Women's individual C3	Anđela Mužinić	Croatia		Yoon Ji-yu	South Korea	Carlotta Ragazzini	Italy	
Table tennis	Women's individual C3	Anđela Mužinić	Croatia		Yoon Ji-yu	South Korea	Xue Juan	China	
Wheelchair fencing	Men's épée A	Sun Gang	China		Piers Gilliver	Great Britain	Hakan Akkaya	Turkey	
Wheelchair fencing	Women's épée A	Chen Yuandong	China		Kwon Hyo-kyeong	South Korea	Gu Haiyan	China	
Wheelchair fencing	Men's épée B	Dimitri Coutya	Great Britain		Visit Kingmanaw	Thailand	Michał Dąbrowski	Poland	
Wheelchair fencing	Women's épée B	Saysunee Jana	Thailand		Kang Su	China	Olena Fedota	Ukraine	
Wheelchair tennis	Men's doubles	Alfie Hewett; Gordon Reid	Great Britain		Takuya Miki; Tokito Oda	Japan	Daniel Caverzaschi; Martín de la Puente	Spain	
Wheelchair tennis	Women's singles	Yui Kamiji	Japan		Diede de Groot	Netherlands	Aniek van Koot	Netherlands	

=== Day 10 — Saturday 7 September ===
7 September 2024 — summary table

Sport	Event	Gold medalist(s)			Silver medalist(s)		Bronze medalist(s)		Ref
Sport	Event	Competitor(s)	Team	Rec	Competitor(s)	Team	Competitor(s)	Team	Ref
Athletics	Men's 100 metres T36	James Turner	Australia	PR	Alexis Chávez	Argentina	Yang Yifei	China	
Athletics	Women's 100 metres T63	Martina Caironi	Italy		Karisma Evi Tiarani	Indonesia	Ndidikama Okoh	Great Britain	
Athletics	Women's 100 metres T63	Martina Caironi	Italy		Karisma Evi Tiarani	Indonesia	Monica Contrafatto	Italy	
Athletics	Men's 200 metres T35	Ihor Tsvietov	Ukraine		Dmitrii Safronov	Neutral Paralympic Athletes	Artem Kalashian	Neutral Paralympic Athletes	
Athletics	Men's 200 metres T37	Andrey Vdovin	Neutral Paralympic Athletes		Ricardo Gomes de Mendonça	Brazil	Christian Gabriel Luiz	Brazil	
Athletics	Men's 200 metres T64	Sherman Guity	Costa Rica	PR	Levi Vloet	Netherlands	Mpumelelo Mhlongo	South Africa	
Athletics	Women's 200 metres T11	Jerusa Geber dos Santos	Brazil	PR	Liu Cuiqing	China	Lahja Ishitile	Namibia	
Athletics	Women's 200 metres T12	Omara Durand	Cuba		Alejandra Paola Pérez López	Venezuela	Simran Sharma	India	
Athletics	Women's 200 metres T47	Anna Grimaldi	New Zealand		Brittni Mason	United States	Sasirawan Inthachot	Thailand	
Athletics	Men's 400 metres T47	Aymane El Haddaoui	Morocco	WR	Ayoub Sadni	Morocco	Thomaz Ruan de Moraes	Brazil	
Athletics	Women's 400 metres T13	Rayane Soares da Silva	Brazil	WR	Lamiya Valiyeva	Azerbaijan	Carolina Duarte	Portugal	
Athletics	Women's 400 metres T38	Karen Palomeque	Colombia	WR	Luca Ekler	Hungary	Lindy Ave	Germany	
Athletics	Men's 800 metres T34	Austin Smeenk	Canada		Chaiwat Rattana	Thailand	Rheed McCracken	Australia	
Athletics	Women's 800 metres T34	Hannah Cockroft	Great Britain		Kare Adenegan	Great Britain	Eva Houston	United States	
Athletics	Men's 1500 metres T38	Amen Allah Tissaoui	Tunisia		Nathan Riech	Canada	Reece Langdon	Australia	
Athletics	Men's long jump T13	Orkhan Aslanov	Azerbaijan		Isaac Jean-Paul	United States	Paulo Henrique Andrade dos Reis	Brazil	
Athletics	Men's long jump T20	Matvei Iakushev	Neutral Paralympic Athletes		Abdul Latif Romly	Malaysia	Jhon Obando	Colombia	
Athletics	Men's shot put F33	Cai Bingchen	China	WR	Deni Černi	Croatia	Zakariae Derhem	Morocco	
Athletics	Men's shot put F34	Mauricio Valencia	Colombia		Azeddine Nouiri	Morocco	Ahmad Hindi	Jordan	
Athletics	Men's shot put F63	Faisal Sorour	Kuwait		Aled Davies	Great Britain	Tom Habscheid	Luxembourg	
Athletics	Women's shot put F40	Lara Baars	Netherlands	PR	Renata Śliwińska	Poland	Raja Jebali	Tunisia	
Athletics	Men's javelin throw F41	Navdeep Singh	India		Sun Pengxiang	China	Wildan Nukhailawi	Iraq	
Athletics	Women's javelin throw F54	Nurkhon Kurbanova	Uzbekistan	WR	Flora Ugwunwa	Nigeria	Elham Salehi	Iran	
Cycling (road)	Men's road race C1–3	Finlay Graham	Great Britain		Thomas Peyroton-Dartet	France	Alexandre Léauté	France	
Cycling (road)	Men's road race T1–2	Chen Jianxin	China		Dennis Connors	United States	Juan José Betancourt Quiroga	Colombia	
Cycling (road)	Women's road race C1–3	Keiko Sugiura	Japan		Flurina Rigling	Switzerland	Clara Brown	United States	
Cycling (road)	Women's road race T1–2	Emma Lund	Denmark		Celine van Till	Switzerland	Marieke van Soest	Netherlands	
Cycling (road)	Mixed team relay H1–5	Mathieu Bosredon; Florian Jouanny; Joseph Fritsch	France		Federico Mestroni; Luca Mazzone; Mirko Testa	Italy	Travis Gaertner; Katerina Brim; Matt Tingley	United States	
Equestrian	Individual freestyle test Grade I	Rihards Snikus	Latvia		Sara Morganti	Italy	Mari Durward-Akhurst	Great Britain	
Equestrian	Individual freestyle test Grade II	Fiona Howard	United States		Georgia Wilson	Great Britain	Heidemarie Dresing	Germany	
Equestrian	Individual freestyle test Grade III	Rebecca Hart	United States		Rixt van der Horst	Netherlands	Natasha Baker	Great Britain	
Equestrian	Individual freestyle test Grade IV	Demi Haerkens	Netherlands		Anna-Lena Niehues	Germany	Kate Shoemaker	United States	
Equestrian	Individual freestyle test Grade V	Michèle George	Belgium		Regine Mispelkamp	Germany	Sophie Wells	Great Britain	
Football 5-a-side	Men's	Alessandro Bartolomucci; Mickael Miguez; Gaël Rivière; Hakim Arezki; Martin Baron; Khalifa Youmé; Frederic Villeroux; Ahmed Tidiane Diakite; Fabrice Morgado; Benoit Chevreau de Montlehu	France		Darío Lencina; Ángel Deldo; Nahuel Heredia; Froilan Padilla; Jesus Merlos; Matias Olivera; Maximiliano Espinillo; Osvaldo Fernández; Mario Ríos; Germán Muleck	Argentina	Luan Gonçalves; Maicon Júnior; Cássio Lopes; Jonatan Borges da Silva; Jardiel Soares; Nonato; Tiago da Silva; Ricardinho; Jefinho; Matheus Bumussa	Brazil	
Judo	Men's -90 kg J1	Arthur Cavalcante da Silva	Brazil		Daniel Powell	Great Britain	Cyril Jonard	France	
Judo	Men's -90 kg J1	Arthur Cavalcante da Silva	Brazil		Daniel Powell	Great Britain	Oleg Crețul	Moldova	
Judo	Men's -90 kg J2	Oleksandr Nazarenko	Ukraine		Hélios Latchoumanaya	France	Davurkhon Karomatov	Uzbekistan	
Judo	Men's -90 kg J2	Oleksandr Nazarenko	Ukraine		Hélios Latchoumanaya	France	Marcelo de Azevedo	Brazil	
Judo	Men's +90 kg J1	Wilians Silva de Araújo	Brazil		Ion Basoc	Moldova	Jason Grandry	France	
Judo	Men's +90 kg J1	Wilians Silva de Araújo	Brazil		Ion Basoc	Moldova	Ilham Zakiyev	Azerbaijan	
Judo	Men's +90 kg J2	İbrahim Bölükbaşı	Turkey		Revaz Chikoidze	Georgia	Zhurkamyrza Shukurbekov	Kazakhstan	
Judo	Men's +90 kg J2	İbrahim Bölükbaşı	Turkey		Revaz Chikoidze	Georgia	Chris Skelley	Great Britain	
Judo	Women's +70 kg J1	Anastasiia Harnyk	Ukraine		Erika Zoaga	Brazil	Nazan Akın	Turkey	
Judo	Women's +70 kg J1	Anastasiia Harnyk	Ukraine		Erika Zoaga	Brazil	Christella Garcia	United States	
Judo	Women's +70 kg J2	Rebeca de Souza	Brazil		Sheyla Hernández Estupiñán	Cuba	Wang Hongyu	China	
Judo	Women's +70 kg J2	Rebeca de Souza	Brazil		Sheyla Hernández Estupiñán	Cuba	Zarina Raifova	Kazakhstan	
Paracanoeing	Men's KL1	Péter Pál Kiss	Hungary		Luis Cardoso da Silva	Brazil	Rémy Boullé	France	
Paracanoeing	Men's KL2	Curtis McGrath	Australia		David Phillipson	Great Britain	Mykola Syniuk	Ukraine	
Paracanoeing	Men's KL3	Brahim Guendouz	Algeria		Dylan Littlehales	Australia	Miquéias Elias Rodrigues	Brazil	
Paracanoeing	Women's VL2	Emma Wiggs	Great Britain		Brianna Hennessy	Canada	Susan Seipel	Australia	
Paracanoeing	Women's VL3	Charlotte Henshaw	Great Britain		Hope Gordon	Great Britain	Zhong Yongyuan	China	
Powerlifting	Men's 88 kg	Yan Panpan	China	PR	Mohamed Elelfat	Egypt	Yurii Babynets	Ukraine	
Powerlifting	Men's 97 kg	Abdelkareem Khattab	Jordan	WR	Ye Jixiong	China	Fabio Torres	Colombia	
Powerlifting	Women's 73 kg	Mariana D'Andrea	Brazil	PR	Ruza Kuzieva	Uzbekistan	Sibel Çam	Turkey	
Powerlifting	Women's 79 kg	Han Miaoyu	China	WR	Bose Omolayo	Nigeria	Safaa Hassan	Egypt	
Sitting volleyball	Women's	Heather Erickson; Monique Burkland; Whitney Dosty; Kaleo Kanahele Maclay; Lora Webster; Nicky Nieves; Tia Edwards; Bethany Zummo; Alexis Shifflett; Sydney Satchell; Katie Holloway Bridge; Emma Schieck	United States		Lyu Hongqin; Zhao Meiling; Qiu Junfei; Zhang Xufei; Li Ting; Huang Lu; Wang Yanan; Zhang Lijun; Su Limei; Tang Xuemei; Xu Yixiao; Hu Huizi	China	Danielle Ellis; Anne Fergusson; Julie Kozun; Allison Lang; Jennifer McCreesh; Sarah Melenka; Jennifer Oakes; Heidi Peters; Felicia Voss-Shafiq; Jolan Wong; Katelyn Wright	Canada	
Swimming	Men's 50 metre backstroke S4	Roman Zhdanov	Neutral Paralympic Athletes		Ángel de Jesús Camacho Ramírez	Mexico	Arnošt Petráček	Czech Republic	
Swimming	Men's 50 metre butterfly S7	Andrii Trusov	Ukraine		Carlos Serrano Zárate	Colombia	Egor Efrosinin	Neutral Paralympic Athletes	
Swimming	Women's 50 metre backstroke S4	Alexandra Stamatopoulou	Greece		Gina Böttcher	Germany	Lídia Vieira da Cruz	Brazil	
Swimming	Women's 50 metre butterfly S7	Danielle Dorris	Canada		Mallory Weggemann	United States	Giulia Terzi	Italy	
Swimming	Men's 100 metre backstroke S6	Yang Hong	China		Wang Jingang	China	Dino Sinovčić	Croatia	
Swimming	Men's 100 metre butterfly S8	Alberto Amodeo	Italy		Wu Hongliang	China	Yang Guanglong	China	
Swimming	Men's 100 metre butterfly S12	Stephen Clegg	Great Britain		Dzmitry Salei	Neutral Paralympic Athletes	Raman Salei	Azerbaijan	
Swimming	Women's 100 metre freestyle S11	Daria Lukianenko	Neutral Paralympic Athletes		Liesette Bruinsma	Netherlands	Zhang Xiaotong	China	
Swimming	Women's 100 metre backstroke S6	Jiang Yuyan	China	WR	Elizabeth Marks	United States	Shelby Newkirk	Canada	
Swimming	Women's 100 metre butterfly S8	Jessica Long	United States		Viktoriia Ishchiulova	Neutral Paralympic Athletes	Alice Tai	Great Britain	
Swimming	Men's 200 metre freestyle S3	Umut Ünlü	Turkey		Denys Ostapchenko	Ukraine	Serhii Palamarchuk	Ukraine	
Swimming	Men's 200 metre individual medley SM10	Stefano Raimondi	Italy		Col Pearse	Australia	Ihor Nimchenko	Ukraine	
Swimming	Women's 200 metre individual medley SM5	He Shenggao	China		Lu Dong	China	Cheng Jiao	China	
Swimming	Women's 200 metre individual medley SM10	Zhang Meng	China		Bianka Pap	Hungary	Lisa Kruger	Netherlands	
Swimming	Mixed 4 x 100 metre freestyle relay 34pts	Stefano Raimondi; Giulia Terzi; Xenia Palazzo; Simone Barlaam	Italy	WR	Alexa Leary; Callum Simpson; Chloe Osborn; Rowan Crothers	Australia	Matthew Torres; Noah Jaffe; Natalie Sims; Christie Raleigh Crossley	United States	
Table tennis	Men's individual C4	Kim Young-gun	South Korea		Wanchai Chaiwut	Thailand	Kim Jung-gil	South Korea	
Table tennis	Men's individual C4	Kim Young-gun	South Korea		Wanchai Chaiwut	Thailand	Isau Ogunkunle	Nigeria	
Table tennis	Men's individual C8	Viktor Didukh	Ukraine		Zhao Shuai	China	Phisit Wangphonphathanasiri	Thailand	
Table tennis	Men's individual C8	Viktor Didukh	Ukraine		Zhao Shuai	China	Maksym Nikolenko	Ukraine	
Table tennis	Men's individual C9	Laurens Devos	Belgium		Lucas Didier	France	Ander Cepas	Spain	
Table tennis	Men's individual C9	Laurens Devos	Belgium		Lucas Didier	France	Ma Lin	Australia	
Table tennis	Women's individual C4	Sandra Mikolaschek	Germany		Borislava Perić	Serbia	Zhou Ying	China	
Table tennis	Women's individual C4	Sandra Mikolaschek	Germany		Borislava Perić	Serbia	Gu Xiaodan	China	
Table tennis	Women's individual C6	Najlah Al-Dayyeni	Iraq		Maryna Lytovchenko	Ukraine	Camelia Ciripan	Romania	
Table tennis	Women's individual C6	Najlah Al-Dayyeni	Iraq		Maryna Lytovchenko	Ukraine	Maliak Alieva	Neutral Paralympic Athletes	
Table tennis	Women's individual C8	Huang Wenjuan	China		Aida Dahlen	Norway	Juliane Wolf	Germany	
Table tennis	Women's individual C8	Huang Wenjuan	China		Aida Dahlen	Norway	Florencia Pérez	Chile	
Table tennis	Women's individual C9	Karolina Pęk	Poland		Xiong Guiyan	China	Lei Lina	Australia	
Table tennis	Women's individual C9	Karolina Pęk	Poland		Xiong Guiyan	China	Alexa Szvitacs	Hungary	
Wheelchair basketball	Men's	Jacob Williams; Talen Jourdan; Brian Bell; Steve Serio; Paul Schulte; Nate Hinze; Trevon Jenifer; AJ Fitzpatrick; Jorge Salazar; Fabian Romo; John Boie; Jeromie Meyer	United States		Abdi Jama; Jim Palmer; Simon Brown; Kyle Marsh; Gregg Warburton; Harry Brown; Phil Pratt; Ben Fox; Peter Cusack; Lee Fryer; Lee Manning; Terry Bywater	Great Britain	Alexander Budde; Aljaksandr Halouski; Julian Lammering; Jan Haller; Jan Sadler; Jens-Eike Albrecht; Lukas Glossner; Matthias Güntner; Nico Dreimüller; Thomas Böhme; Tobias Hell; Thomas Reier	Germany	
Wheelchair fencing	Men's épée team	Tian Jianquan; Sun Gang; Zhang Jie; Zhong Saichun	China		Zainulabdeen Al-Madhkhoori; Ammar Ali; Hayder Al-Ogaili	Iraq	Piers Gilliver; Dimitri Coutya; Oliver Lam-Watson	Great Britain	
Wheelchair fencing	Women's épée team	Gu Haiyan; Zou Xufeng; Kang Su; Chen Yuandong	China		Yevheniia Breus; Nadiia Doloh; Olena Fedota; Nataliia Morkvych	Ukraine	Aphinya Thongdaeng; Duean Nakprasit; Saysunee Jana	Thailand	
Wheelchair tennis	Men's singles	Tokito Oda	Japan		Alfie Hewett	Great Britain	Gustavo Fernández	Argentina	

=== Day 11 — Sunday 8 September ===
8 September 2024 — summary table

Closing ceremony

- The closing ceremony was held at Stade de France at 20:30 CEST (UTC+2). It included the traditional Paralympic flag handover to Los Angeles, United States, the host city of the next Summer Paralympics in 2028.

Sport	Event	Gold medalist(s)			Silver medalist(s)		Bronze medalist(s)		Ref
Sport	Event	Competitor(s)	Team	Rec	Competitor(s)	Team	Competitor(s)	Team	Ref
Athletics	Men's marathon T12	Wajdi Boukhili	Tunisia		Alberto Suárez Laso	Spain	El Amin Chentouf	Morocco	
Athletics	Men's marathon T54	Marcel Hug	Switzerland		Jin Hua	China	Tomoki Suzuki	Japan	
Athletics	Women's marathon T12	Fatima Ezzahra El Idrissi	Morocco	WR	Meryem En-Nourhi	Morocco	Misato Michishita	Japan	
Athletics	Women's marathon T54	Catherine Debrunner	Switzerland		Madison de Rozario	Australia	Susannah Scaroni	United States	
Paracanoeing	Men's VL2	Fernando Rufino de Paulo	Brazil		Igor Alex Tofalini	Brazil	Steven Haxton	United States	
Paracanoeing	Men's VL3	Vladyslav Yepifanov	Ukraine		Jack Eyers	Great Britain	Peter Cowan	New Zealand	
Paracanoeing	Women's KL1	Katherinne Wollermann	Chile		Maryna Mazhula	Ukraine	Edina Müller	Germany	
Paracanoeing	Women's KL2	Charlotte Henshaw	Great Britain		Emma Wiggs	Great Britain	Anja Adler	Germany	
Paracanoeing	Women's KL3	Laura Sugar	Great Britain		Nélia Barbosa	France	Felicia Laberer	Germany	
Powerlifting	Men's 107 kg	Aliakbar Gharibshahi	Iran	PR	Enkhbayaryn Sodnompiljee	Mongolia	José de Jesús Castillo	Mexico	
Powerlifting	Men's +107 kg	Ahmad Aminzadeh	Iran		Anton Kriukov	Ukraine	Akaki Jintcharadze	Georgia	
Powerlifting	Women's 86 kg	Tayana Medeiros	Brazil	PR	Zheng Feifei	China	Marion Serrano	Chile	
Powerlifting	Women's +86 kg	Folashade Oluwafemiayo	Nigeria	WR	Deng Xuemei	China	Nadia Ali	Egypt	
Wheelchair basketball	Women's	Ilse Arts; Sylvana van Hees; Lindsay Frelink; Jitske Visser; Julia van der Sprong; Bo Kramer; Xena Wimmenhoeve; Cher Korver; Saskia Pronk; Carina de Rooij-Versloot; Mariska Beijer; Ylonne Post	Netherlands		Alejandra Ibáñez; Abigail Bauleke; Josie Aslakson; Natalie Schneider; Rebecca Murray; Rose Hollermann; Kaitlyn Eaton; Lindsey Zurbrugg; Emily Oberst; Bailey Moody; Ixhelt González; Courtney Ryan	United States	Xuejing Chen; Xuemei Zhang; Tonglei Zhang; Guidi Lyu; Suiling Lin; Xiaolian Huang; Jingwen Chen; Qiaoling Qiu; Meimei Zhang; Yun Long; Jiameng Dai; Xiang He	China	
