= 2022 FEI World Championships =

Equestrian event in Herning, Denmark

2022 ECCO FEI World Championships
- Host city: Herning, Denmark
- Events: 4 disciplines
- Opening: 6 August
- Closing: 14 August
- Website: Herning 2022

The 2022 ECCO FEI World Championships were held in Herning, Denmark. It was the ninth edition of the Games, which are held every four years and run by the International Federation for Equestrian Sports (FEI). For team events in the dressage and show jumping disciplines, these Games were the first qualifying event for the 2024 Summer Olympics.

== Venues and disciplines ==
Competition venues in at the Messecenter Herning hosted the following disciplines:

- Herning
  - Stutteri Ask Stadium – Jumping, Dressage
  - BB Horse Arena – Para-equestrian Dressage, international youth classes in dressage, show-jumping
  - Jyske Bank Boxen – Vaulting, side-events

== Schedule ==
All times are Central European Summer Time (UTC+2)

=== Dressage ===
Event date	Starting time	Event details
6 August	08:00	Grand Prix Day 1
7 August	08:00	Grand Prix Day 2
8 August	12:00	Grand Prix Special
10 August	19:00	Grand Prix Freestyle

=== Jumping ===
Event date	Starting time	Event details
10 August	08:30	Team Competition Day 1
11 August	08:00	Individual Competition Qualification
12 August	16:00	Team Competition Day 2
14 August	15:00	Individual Competition

=== Vaulting ===
Event date	Starting time	Event details
6 August	08:30 – 19:30	Technical Competition
7 August	08:30 – 20:00	Team Competition
8 August	09:00 – 17:30	Team Competition
10 August	09:00 – 17:00	Finals

=== Para-Dressage ===
Event date	Starting time	Event details
10 August	09:00 – 17:00	Ind. Champ. Test Grade II & IV & V
11 August	09:00 – 16:00	Ind. Test Grade I & III
12 August	09:00 – 17:00	Team Test Grade I, II, III, IV, V
13 August	09:00 – 17:00	Team Test Grade I, II, III, IV, V
14 August	08:00 – 17:00	Ind. Freestyle Test Grade I, II, III, IV, V

== Officials ==
Appointment of (Olympic disciplines) officials is as follows:

Jumping

- (Norway) Carsten Andre Soerlie (Ground Jury President)
- (France) Patrice Alvado (Ground Jury Member)
- (Denmark) Jens Hellmers (Ground Jury Member)
- (United States) David Distler (Ground Jury Member)
- (Sweden) Anna Lindqvist (Ground Jury Member)
- (Switzerland) Bruno Laubscher (Ground Jury Member)
- (United States) Antony D’Ambrosio (FEI Technical Delegate)

Dressage

- (Denmark) Susanne Baarup (Ground Jury President)
- (United Kingdom) Peter Storr (Ground Jury Member)
- (Netherlands) Mariëtte Sanders van Gansewinkel (Ground Jury Member)
- (Germany) Elke Ebert (Ground Jury Member)
- (Luxembourg) Christof Umbach (Ground Jury Member)
- (United States) Anne Gribbons (Ground Jury Member)
- (France) Raphaël Saleh (Ground Jury Member)
- (United States) Janet Foy (FEI Technical Delegate)
- (Sweden) Magnus Ringmark (Reserve member)

Para-Dressage

- (Germany) Marco Orsini (Ground Jury President)
- (Italy) Kathrine Lucheschi (Ground Jury Member)
- (Australia) Sue Cunningham (Ground Jury Member)
- (United Kingdom) John Robinson (Ground Jury Member)
- (Netherlands) Jeannette Wolfs (Ground Jury Member)
- (United States) Kristi Wysocki (Ground Jury Member)
- (Norway) Kjell Myhre (Ground Jury Member)
- (Germany) Jan Holger Holtschmidt (FEI Technical Delegate)
- (Belgium) Marc Urban (Reserve Member)

== Participating nations ==
49 nations are scheduled to take part.

- Argentina (13)
- Armenia (1)
- Australia (20)
- Austria (27)
- Belgium (14)
- Brazil (19)
- Canada (13)
- China (1)
- Colombia (8)
- Czech Republic (4)
- Denmark (23)
- Dominican Republic (1)
- Egypt (2)
- Estonia (1)
- Finland (15)
- France (20)
- Germany (28)
- (United Kingdom) Great Britain (21)
- Greece (3)
- Hungary (5)
- India (2)
- (Republic of Ireland) Ireland (13)
- Israel (3)
- Italy (14)
- Japan (11)
- Jordan (2)
- Latvia (3)
- Lebanon (1)
- Lithuania (2)
- Luxembourg (2)
- Mexico (6)
- Moldova (1)
- Morocco (1)
- Netherlands (25)
- New Zealand (3)
- Norway (12)
- Palestine (1)
- Poland (10)
- Portugal (6)
- Saudi Arabia (1)
- Singapore (2)
- Slovakia (1)
- South Africa (2)
- Spain (20)
- Sweden (21)
- Switzerland (21)
- Turkey (2)
- United States (26)
- (United States Virgin Islands) Virgin Islands (1)

== Medal summary ==
=== Medalists ===
Event	Gold	Silver	Bronze
Individual special dressage	Charlotte Fry on Glamourdale; Great Britain	Cathrine Laudrup-Dufour on Vamos Amigos; Denmark	Dinja van Liere on Hermes; Netherlands
Individual freestyle dressage	Charlotte Fry on Glamourdale; Great Britain	Cathrine Laudrup-Dufour on Vamos Amigos; Denmark	Dinja van Liere on Hermes; Netherlands
Team dressage	Denmark; Nanna Merrald Rasmussen on Blue Hors Zack; Carina Cassøe Krüth on Heiline's Danciera; Daniel Bachmann Andersen on Marshall-Bell; Cathrine Laudrup-Dufour on Vamos Amigos	Great Britain; Richard Davison on Bubblingh; Gareth Hughes on Classic Briolinca; Charlotte Dujardin on Imhotep; Charlotte Fry on Glamourdale	Germany; Ingrid Klimke on Franziskus; Benjamin Werndl on Famoso OLD; Isabell Werth on DSP Quantaz; Frederic Wandres on Duke of Britain FRH
Individual jumping	Henrik von Eckermann on King Edward; Sweden	Jérôme Guery on Quel Homme de Hus; Belgium	Maikel van der Vleuten on Beauville Z N.O.P. Netherlands
Team jumping	Sweden; Henrik von Eckermann on King Edward; Malin Baryard-Johnsson on H&M Indiana; Jens Fredricson on Markan Cosmopolit; Peder Fredricson on H&M All In	Netherlands; Sanne Thijssen on Con Quidam RB; Maikel van der Vleuten on Beauville Z N.O.P. Jur Vrieling on Long John Silver; Harrie Smolders on Monaco N.O.P.	Great Britain; Ben Maher on Faltich HB; Joe Stockdale on Equine America Cacharel; Harry Charles on Romeo 88; Scott Brash on Hello Jefferson
Men's vaulting	Lambert Leclezio on Estado IFCE lunged by Loic Devedu; France	Quentin Jabet on Ronaldo 200 lunged by Andrea Boe; France	Jannik Heiland on Dark Beluga FRH lunged by Barbara Rosiny; Germany
Women's vaulting	Manon Moutinho on Saitiri lunged by Corinne Bosshard; France	Julia Sophie Wagner on Giovanni 185 lunged by Katja Wagner; Germany	Sheena Bendixen on Klintholms Ramstein lunged by Lasse Kristensen; Denmark
Squad vaulting	Germany; Rebecca Verlage; Thomas Brüsewitz; Mona Mertens; Gianna Ronca; Chiara Congia; Justin van Gerven on Calidor 10 lunged by Patric Looser	France; Manon Moutinho; Lambert Leclezio; Jeanne Braun; Louis Dumont; Dorian Terrier; Quentin Jabet on Londontime lunged by Corinne Bosshard	Switzerland; Noemi Licci; Nadja Büttiker; Ilona Hannich; Sina Graf; Stefanie Brändle; Miria Kleger on Rayo de la Luz lunged by Monika Winkler-Bischofberger
Pas-de-deux vaulting	Germany; Chiara Congia; Justin van Gerven on Highlight lunged by Alexandra Knauf	Germany; Diana Harwardt; Peter Künne on DSP Sir Laulau lunged by Hendrik Falk	Italy; Rebecca Greggio; Davide Zanella on Orlando Tancredi lunged by Claudia Petersohn
Team vaulting	France; Manon Moutinho (i) on Saitiri lunged by Corinne Bosshard; Lambert Leclezio (i) on Estado IFCE lunged by Loic Devedu; Manon Moutinho (s); Lambert Leclezio (s); Jeanne Braun (s); Louis Dumont (s); Dorian Terrier (s); Quentin Jabet (s) on Londontime lunged by Corinne Bosshard	Denmark; Iben Dines Pedersen (i) on Tophoejs Geleto Lieto lunged by Hanne Haagen Hansen; Sheena Bendixen (i) on Klintholms Ramstein lunged by Lasse Kristensen; Helena Nagel-Harvig (s); Nanna Trab Christensen (s); Sheena Bendixen (s); Helena Sjøgren (s); Anna Lawaetz (s); Esther Rasmussen (s) on Turbo af Kloster lunged by Maria Rasmussen	Austria; Dominik Eder (i) on Asti Royal XI lunged by Lena Kalcher-Prein; Isabel Fiala (i) on Pink Floyd lunged by Veronika Greisberger; Lena Bachbauer (s); Sarah Gollubics (s); Rebecca Friesser (s); Sophia Wackerle (s); Sophie Pittl (s); Dominik Eder (s) on Don Rudi lunged by Martina Seyrling
Individual para-dressage championship test grade I	Rihards Snikus on King of the Dance; Latvia	Sara Morganti on Royal Delight; Italy	Michael Murphy on Cleverboy; Ireland
Individual para-dressage championship test grade II	Katrine Kristensen on Goerklintgaards Quater; Denmark	Pepo Puch on Sailor's Blue; Austria	Lee Pearson on Breezer; Great Britain
Individual para-dressage championship test grade III	Tobias Jørgensen on Jolene Hill; Denmark	Natasha Baker on Keystone Dawn Chorus; Great Britain	Rebecca Hart on El Corona Texel; United States
Individual para-dressage championship test grade IV	Sanne Voets on Demantur RS2 N.O.P. Netherlands	Demi Haerkens on EHL Daula; Netherlands	Rodolpho Riskalla on Don Henrico; Brazil
Individual para-dressage championship test grade V	Michèle George on Best of 8 Belgium	Sophie Wells on Don Cara M Great Britain	Frank Hosmar on Alphaville N.O.P. Netherlands
Individual para-dressage freestyle test grade I	Sara Morganti on Royal Delight; Italy	Rihards Snikus on King of the Dance; Latvia	Michael Murphy on Cleverboy; Ireland
Individual para-dressage freestyle test grade II	Katrine Kristensen on Goerklintgaards Quater; Denmark	Lee Pearson on Breezer; Great Britain	Georgia Wilson on Sakura; Great Britain
Individual para-dressage freestyle test grade III	Tobias Jørgensen on Jolene Hill; Denmark	Lotte Krijnsen on Rosenstolz; Netherlands	Natasha Baker on Keystone Dawn Chorus; Great Britain
Individual para-dressage freestyle test grade IV	Sanne Voets on Demantur RS2 N.O.P. Netherlands	Kate Shoemaker on Quiana; United States	Rodolpho Riskalla on Don Henrico; Brazil
Individual para-dressage freestyle test grade V	Michèle George on Best of 8 Belgium	Frank Hosmar on Alphaville N.O.P. Netherlands	Sophie Wells on Don Cara M Great Britain
Team para-dressage	Netherlands; Sanne Voets on Demantur RS2 N.O.P. Demi Haerkens on EHL Daula; Lotte Krijnsen on Rosenstolz; Frank Hosmar on Alphaville N.O.P.	Denmark; Katrine Kristensen on Goerklintgaards Quater; Karla Dyhm-Junge on Miss Daisy; Tobias Jørgensen on Jolene Hill; Nicole Johnsen on Moromax	United States; Kate Shoemaker on Quiana; Beatrice de Lavalette on Sixth Sense; Roxanne Trunnell on Fortunato H20; Rebecca Hart on El Corona Texel

== Medal table ==
* Host nation (Denmark)

Rank	Nation	Gold	Silver	Bronze	Total
1	Denmark*	5	4	1	10
2	Netherlands	3	4	4	11
3	France	3	2	0	5
4	Great Britain	2	4	5	11
5	Germany	2	2	2	6
6	Belgium	2	1	0	3
7	Sweden	2	0	0	2
8	Italy	1	1	1	3
9	Latvia	1	1	0	2
10	United States	0	1	2	3
11	Austria	0	1	1	2
12	Brazil	0	0	2	2
12	Ireland	0	0	2	2
14	Switzerland	0	0	1	1
Totals (14 entries)		21	21	21	63
