= Equestrian at the 2024 Summer Paralympics – Individual championship test grade IV =

Equestrian – Individual championship test, grade IV at the XVII Paralympic Games
- Venue: Palace of Versailles
- Date: 4 September 2024
- Competitors: 15
- Winning score: 78.722

Medalists
1st place, gold medalist(s)		Demi Haerkens riding Daula	Netherlands
2nd place, silver medalist(s)		Sanne Voets riding Demantur	Netherlands
3rd place, bronze medalist(s)		Anna-Lena Niehues riding Quimbaya 6	Germany

The individual championship test, grade IV, para-equestrian dressage event at the 2024 Summer Paralympics was held on 4 September, 2024 at the Palace of Versailles in Paris.

The competition was assessed by a ground jury composed of five judges placed at locations designated E, H, C, M, and B. Each judge rated the competitors' performances with a percentage score. The five scores from the jury were then averaged to determine a rider's total percentage score.

== Classification ==
Grade IV riders are described by the IPC as "athletes that have a severe impairment or deficiency of both arms or a moderate impairment of all four limbs or short stature."

== Results ==
Riders performed one test apiece. In addition to being an event in its own right, the Championship test was the qualification round for the Freestyle event, with the top eight riders progressing to the second final. 15 Riders started the event.

Rank	Rider Horse	Nation	Scores					Total	FSQ
Rank	Rider Horse	Nation	E	H	C	M	B	Total	FSQ
1st place, gold medalist(s)	Demi Haerkens riding Daula	Netherlands (NED)	75.000	79.722	78.611	79.722	80.556	78.722	Q
2nd place, silver medalist(s)	Sanne Voets riding Demantur	Netherlands (NED)	77.500	74.722	79.028	75.556	75.833	76.528	Q
3rd place, bronze medalist(s)	Anna-Lena Niehues riding Quimbaya 6	Germany (GER)	71.944	76.111	75.139	75.278	77.639	75.222	Q
4	Vladimir Vinchon riding Pegase Mayenne	France (FRA)	72.639	73.611	71.111	71.528	75.556	72.889	Q
5	Kate Shoemaker riding Vianne	United States (USA)	73.889	72.083	69.028	74.028	72.083	72.222	Q
6	Manon Claeys riding Katharina Sollenburg	Belgium (BEL)	69.583	71.667	70.972	71.667	72.083	71.194	Q
7	Louise Etzner Jakobsson riding Goldstrike B.J.	Sweden (SWE)	70.000	70.694	70.833	71.111	72.639	71.055	Q
8	Alexia Pittier riding Sultan 768	France (FRA)	68.333	71.667	69.583	72.778	71.667	70.806	Q
9	Pia Wulff Jelstrup riding Zafia	Denmark (DEN)	67.361	67.917	68.750	70.000	70.278	68.861	
10	Monika Bartys riding Caspar	Poland (POL)	67.917	69.444	67.222	67.778	65.694	67.611	
11	Anita Hennie Johnsen riding Lindegaard Lucky	Norway (NOR)	68.750	65.417	65.556	66.111	66.528	66.472	
12	Dianne Barnes riding Sorena	Australia (AUS)	64.722	65.972	65.694	65.278	65.556	65.444	
13	Louise Duncan riding Showcase BC	New Zealand (NZL)	65.556	63.472	63.889	65.417	66.389	64.945	
14	Philippa Johnson-Dwyer riding Just In Time	South Africa (RSA)	59.167	65.694	64.167	64.306	66.111	63.889	
15	Laura Kangasniemi riding Goldprins	Finland (FIN)	61.944	66.111	65.139	63.472	61.944	63.722	
