= Benjamin Werndl =

German equestrian (born 1984)

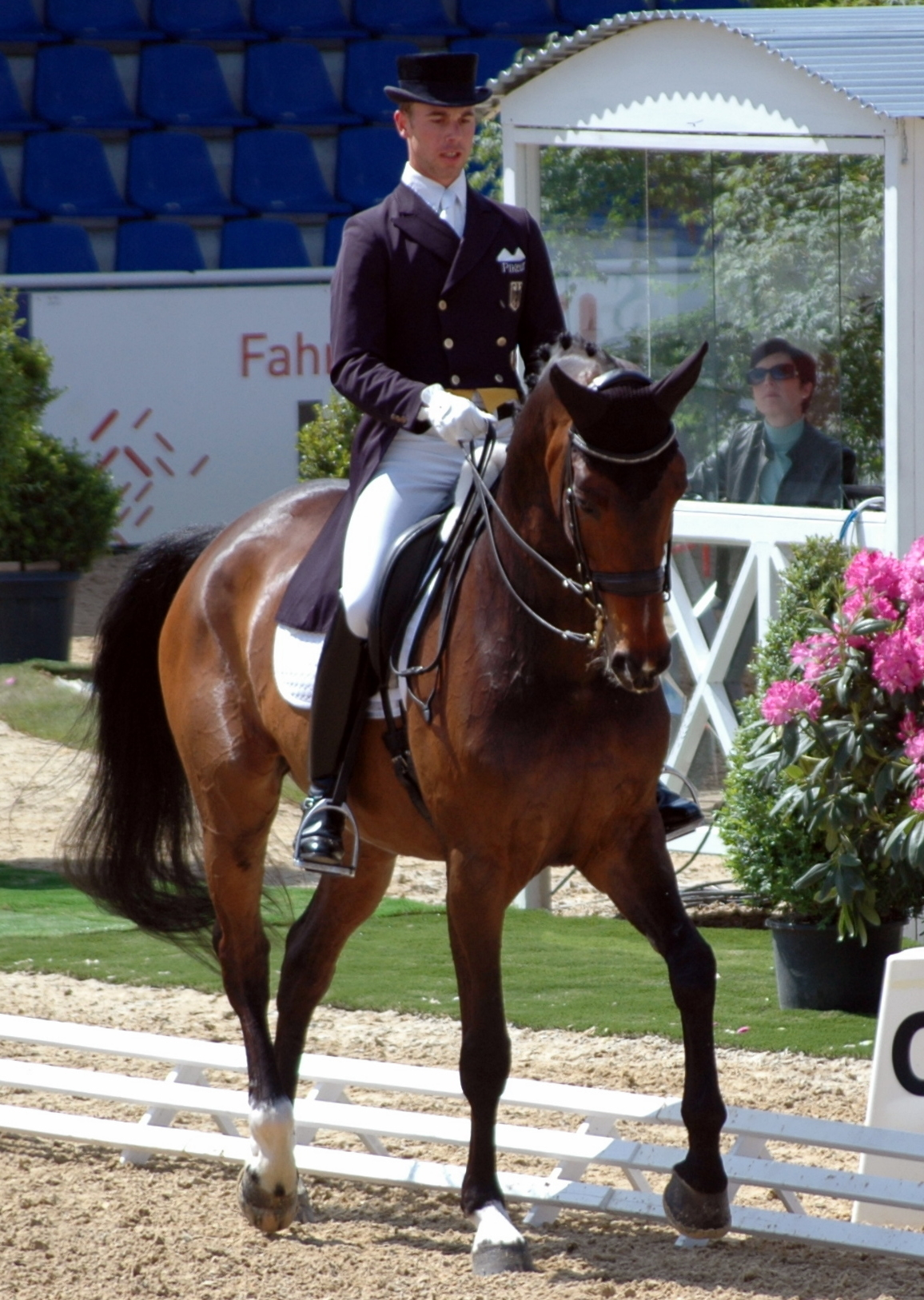
- Benjamin Werndl in 2014

Personal information
- Nationality: German
- Born: 20 July 1984 (age 41)

Sport
- Sport: Equestrian
Medal record
Equestrian
Representing Germany
World Championships
Bronze medal – third place	2022 Herning	Team dressage

Benjamin Werndl (born 20 July 1984) is a German dressage rider. Werndl competed at the 2022 World Championships in Herning, where he won a bronze medal with the German team and came 4th in the individual Freestyle final. Werndl also competed at the 2019 World Cup Finals in Gothenburg, where he finished 12th.

Benjamin Werndl is the brother of Jessica von Bredow-Werndl, who won double gold at the 2020 Olympic Games in Tokyo. Together they run a dressage stable Aubenhausen in Germany.
