= Sanne Thijssen =

Dutch show jumper

Personal information
- Nationality: Dutch
- Born: 9 November 1998 (age 27)

Sport
- Country: Netherlands
- Sport: Equestrian
Medal record
Equestrian
Representing the Netherlands
World Championships
Silver medal – second place	2022 Herning	Team jumping

Sanne Thijssen (born 9 November 1998) is a Dutch show jumper. She was a silver medalist in the team event at the 2022 FEI World Championships.

== Early life ==
The daughter of Leon Thijssen, she grew up in Baarlo and started her international competition career at 15 years-of-age.

== Career ==
In 2021, she was second in a 1.50 ranking class event in Gorla on Con Quidam RB.

She and Con Quidam RB won the individual competition at the May 2022 Global Champions Tour event in Madrid, Spain. She was a silver medalist in the team event at the 2022 FEI World Championships in Herning, Denmark, riding Con Quidam RB in August 2022.

In August 2023, she won the Global Champions Tour Grand Prix of Valkenswaard on Con Quidam RB, winning against eight out of world’s top 10 riders.

In November 2023, she won an CSI4* event Maastricht on Carembar Blue. In March 2024, she won Vejer de la Frontera in the 1.50m Longines Ranking class with the 18-year-old Con Quidam RB.

== Personal life ==
Her sister Mel Thijssen also competes as a show jumper.
