= Dinja van Liere =

Dutch dressage rider (born 1990)

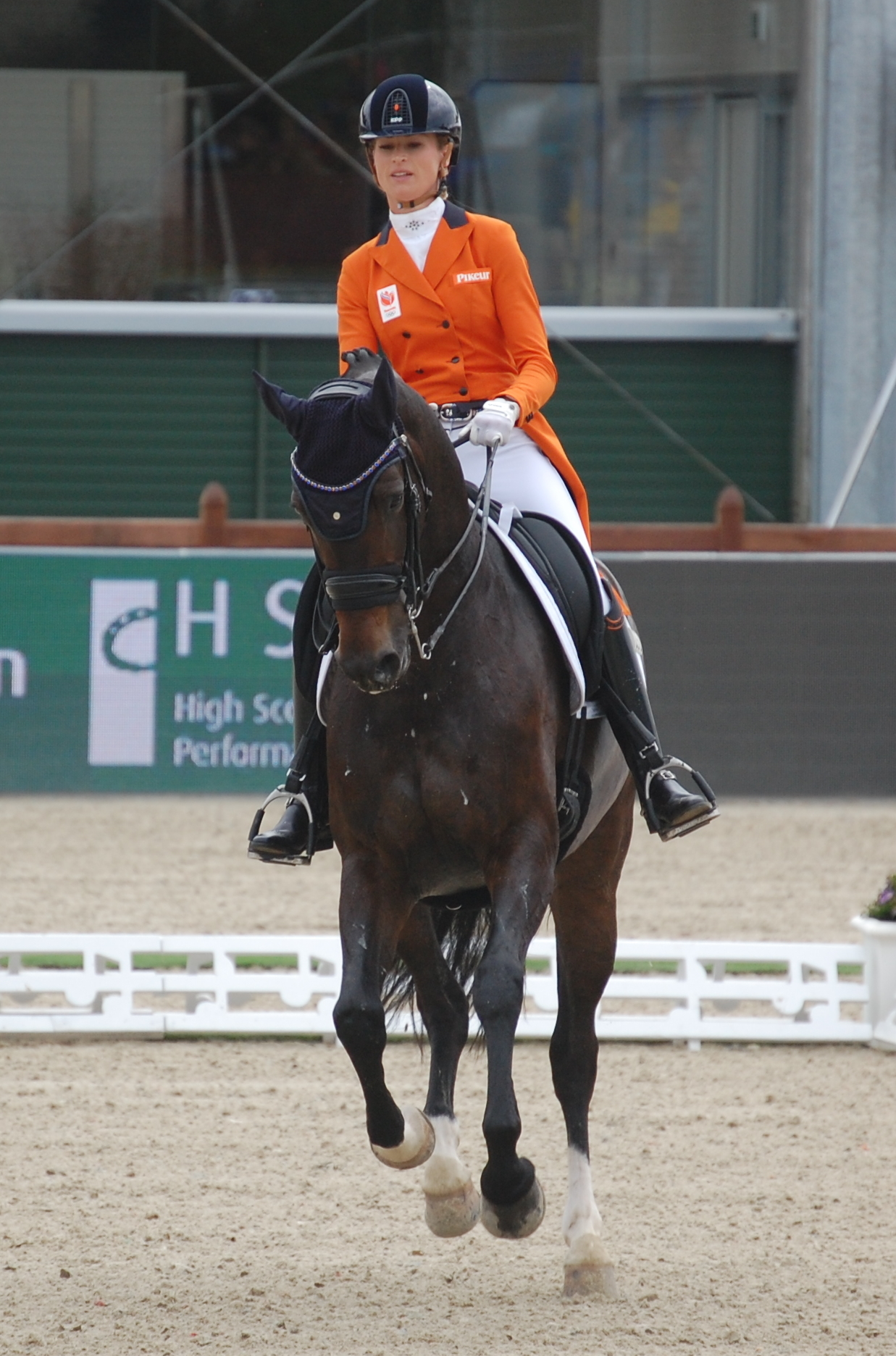
- Dinja van Liere and Haute Couture (2021)

Personal information
- Born: 16 August 1990 (age 35) Goes, Netherlands

Sport
- Country: Netherlands
- Sport: Dressage
- Coached by: Rieky Young
Medal record
Equestrian
Representing the Netherlands
World Equestrian Games
Bronze medal – third place	2022 Herning	Individual special dressage
Bronze medal – third place	2022 Herning	Individual freestyle dressage
World Championships for Young Horses
Bronze medal – third place	2012 Verden	Individual dressage

Dinja van Liere (born 16 August 1990) is a Dutch dressage rider. She competed at the European Dressage Championships in Hagen 2021 and was the traveling reserve for the Dutch team at the Olympic Games in Tokyo.

Van Liere represented the Dutch team at the 2024 Olympic Games in Paris, becoming fourth in the team competition and fourth in the individual competition with her horse Hermes, scoring a personal best of 88.432% in the Grand Prix Freestyle, only half a percentage to the bronze medal.

== Equestrian career ==
Van Liere started riding at a young age and became stable rider at Stal Hexagon. In 2012 she became National Indoor Champion in the M2 level and the same year she won a bronze medal at the World Championships for Young Horses in Verden, Germany. The years after she rode successfully in the Grand Prix under 25, but her breakthrough came in 2021 when she competed two horses Haute Couture and Hermes in the international Grand Prix. She was named to represent The Netherlands at the Olympic Games in Tokyo but after a technical mistake in the owners' registration in the database of the FEI, she was not allowed to compete that horse. With her other horse Haute Couture Van Liere was named as traveling reserve. A month later she was selected by the Dutch Equestrian Federation to compete at the European Championships in Hagen.
