= Anna-Lena Niehues =

German paralympic equestrian (born 1984)

Personal information
- Born: 28 August 1984 (age 41) Gronau, Germany

Sport
- Country: Germany
- Sport: Para-equestrian
Medal record
Para-equestrian
Representing Germany
Paralympic Games
Silver medal – second place	2024 Paris	Individual freestyle test grade IV
Bronze medal – third place	2024 Paris	Individual championship test grade IV
Bronze medal – third place	2024 Paris	Team

Anna-Lena Niehues (born 28 August 1984) is a German paralympic equestrian. She competed at the 2024 Summer Paralympics, winning the bronze medal in the individual championship test grade IV event.
