= Equestrian at the 2024 Summer Paralympics – Individual freestyle test grade IV =

Equestrian – Individual freestyle test, grade IV at the XVII Paralympic Games
- Venue: Palais de Versailles
- Date: 7 September 2024
- Competitors: 8 from 6 nations
- Winning score: 83.840

Medalists
1st place, gold medalist(s)		Demi Haerkens on Daula	Netherlands
2nd place, silver medalist(s)		Anna-Lena Niehues on Quimbaya 6	Germany
3rd place, bronze medalist(s)		Kate Shoemaker on Vianne	United States

The individual freestyle test, grade IV, para-equestrian dressage event at the 2024 Summer Paralympics was contested on the afternoon of 7 September 2024 at the Palace of Versailles, Paris.

The competition was assessed by a ground jury composed of five judges placed at locations designated E, H, C, M, and B. Each judge rated the competitors' performances with a percentage score across two areas - technique and artistry. The ten scores from the jury were then averaged to determine a rider's total percentage score.

== Ground jury ==
Judge at E	Suzanne Cunningham ( Australia)
Judge at H	Katherine Lucheschi ( Italy)
Judge at C	Ineke Jansen ( Netherlands), jury president
Judge at M	Freddy Leyman ( Belgium)
Judge at B	John Robinson ( Great Britain)

== Classification ==
Grade IV riders are described by the IPC as " athletes [that] have a severe impairment or deficiency of both arms or a moderate impairment of all four limbs or short stature."

== Results ==
Riders performed one test apiece. Unlike the Championship test, riders and horses are marked on both technical ('Tech.') and artistic criteria ('Art.'). All five marks in both categories are then averaged for the final score. As with all freestyle finals, 8 Riders started the event.

Rank	Rider Horse	Nationality	Section	E	H	C	M	B	Avg	Result
1st place, gold medalist(s)	Demi Haerkens on Daula	Netherlands		83.03	81.55	85.45	87.63	81.55		83.84
1st place, gold medalist(s)	Demi Haerkens on Daula	Netherlands	Tech.	81.25	79.50	82.50	82.25	79.50	81.00	83.84
1st place, gold medalist(s)	Demi Haerkens on Daula	Netherlands	Art.	84.80	83.60	88.40	93.00	83.60	86.68	83.84
2nd place, silver medalist(s)	Anna-Lena Niehues on Quimbaya 6	Germany		81.25	79.25	80.10	85.50	78.40		80.90
2nd place, silver medalist(s)	Anna-Lena Niehues on Quimbaya 6	Germany	Tech.	78.50	75.50	77.00	80.00	75.00	77.20	80.90
2nd place, silver medalist(s)	Anna-Lena Niehues on Quimbaya 6	Germany	Art.	84.00	83.00	83.20	91.00	81.80	84.60	80.90
3rd place, bronze medalist(s)	Kate Shoemaker on Vianne	United States		80.18	82.13	81.28	79.25	78.03		80.17
3rd place, bronze medalist(s)	Kate Shoemaker on Vianne	United States	Tech.	77.75	79.25	76.75	75.50	74.25	76.70	80.17
3rd place, bronze medalist(s)	Kate Shoemaker on Vianne	United States	Art.	82.60	85.00	85.80	83.00	81.80	83.64	80.17
4	Sanne Voets on Demantur	Netherlands		81.10	82.45	82.58	75.38	77.90		79.88
4	Sanne Voets on Demantur	Netherlands	Tech.	78.00	78.50	77.75	73.75	73.00	76.20	79.88
4	Sanne Voets on Demantur	Netherlands	Art.	84.20	86.40	87.40	77.00	82.80	83.56	79.88
5	Vladimir Vinchon on Pegase Mayenne	France		76.98	76.73	75.13	74.88	77.45		76.23
5	Vladimir Vinchon on Pegase Mayenne	France	Tech.	73.75	73.25	69.25	73.75	72.50	72.50	76.23
5	Vladimir Vinchon on Pegase Mayenne	France	Art.	80.20	80.20	81.00	76.00	82.40	79.96	76.23
6	Manon Claeys on Katharina Sollenburg	Belgium		78.63	75.90	73.73	75.00	76.73		76.00
6	Manon Claeys on Katharina Sollenburg	Belgium	Tech.	78.25	73.00	72.25	72.00	74.25	73.95	76.00
6	Manon Claeys on Katharina Sollenburg	Belgium	Art.	79.00	78.80	75.20	78.00	79.20	78.04	76.00
7	Alexia Pittier on Sultan 768	France		79.18	75.28	73.08	74.88	76.58		75.80
7	Alexia Pittier on Sultan 768	France	Tech.	76.75	71.75	69.75	71.75	72.75	72.55	75.80
7	Alexia Pittier on Sultan 768	France	Art.	81.60	78.80	76.40	78.00	80.40	79.04	75.80
8	Louise Etzner Jakobsson on Goldstrike B.J.	Sweden		73.33	72.08	74.88	73.00	74.58		73.57
8	Louise Etzner Jakobsson on Goldstrike B.J.	Sweden	Tech.	69.25	68.75	70.75	71.00	69.75	69.90	73.57
8	Louise Etzner Jakobsson on Goldstrike B.J.	Sweden	Art.	77.40	75.40	79.00	75.00	79.40	77.24	73.57
