= Paralympic record =

Paralympic records are the best performances in a specific event in that event's history in either the Summer Paralympic Games or the Winter Paralympic Games. As each type of Paralympic Games occur only once every four years many of these records do not correspond with world records, though they are considered important achievements in the careers of the athletes who are able to break or tie them.

The International Paralympic Committee recognizes records only for certain events of certain sports. These include:

- Archery (list)
- Athletics (list)
- Cycling (list)
- Powerlifting (list)
- Rowing (list)
- Swimming (list)
