= Demi Haerkens =

Dutch para-equestrian (born 1998)

Personal information
- Born: 30 May 1998 (age 28)

Sport
- Country: Netherlands
- Sport: Para-equestrian
Medal record
Para-equestrian
Representing Netherlands
Paralympic Games
Gold medal – first place	2024 Paris	Ind. championship test grade IV
Gold medal – first place	2024 Paris	Ind. freestyle test grade IV
Silver medal – second place	2024 Paris	Team

Demi Haerkens (born 30 May 1998) is a Dutch para-equestrian. She competed at the 2024 Summer Paralympics and won a gold medal in the individual championship test grade IV.
