= Kate Shoemaker =

American Paralympic equestrian

Personal information
- National team: United States
- Born: August 25, 1987 (age 38) Eagle, Idaho, U.S.

Sport
- Sport: Para-equestrian
Medal record
Para-equestrian
Representing the United States
Paralympic Games
| Bronze medal – third place | 2020 Tokyo | Team |
| Bronze medal – third place | 2024 Paris | Individual freestyle test grade IV |
World Games
| Gold medal – first place | 2026 Aachen | Individual freestyle test grade IV |
| Silver medal – second place | 2022 Herning | Individual freestyle test grade IV |
| Bronze medal – third place | 2022 Herning | Team |

Kate Shoemaker (born August 25, 1987) is an American Paralympic equestrian. She represented the United States at the 2020 and 2024 Summer Paralympics.

== Career ==
Shoemaker made her World Equestrian Games debut in 2018 and won a bronze medal in the individual para-dressage freestyle grade IV event. She again competed at the World Championships in 2022 where she won a silver medal in the individual para-dressage freestyle grade IV event, and a bronze medal in the team para-dressage event.

Shoemaker represented the United States at the 2020 Summer Paralympics and won a bronze medal in the team event, alongside Rebecca Hart and Roxanne Trunnell. She again represented the United States at the 2024 Summer Paralympics and won a bronze medal in the individual freestyle test grade IV event.

== Personal life ==
Shoemaker suffers from white matter lesions from periventricular ischemia causing motor control dysfunction, muscle weakness, and spasms on the right side of her body.

She is also an equine veterinarian and runs her own practice, Velocity Equine Sports Medicine, in Wellington, Florida.
