= Sanne Voets =

Dutch Paralympic equestrian

Personal information
- Full name: Sanne Voets
- Nationality: Dutch
- Born: 17 September 1986 (age 39) Rosmalen, Netherlands
Medal record
Event	1st	2nd	3rd
Paralympics	3	3	1
World Equestrian Games	4	2	0
European Championships	5	2	2
Total	12	7	3
Representing Netherlands
Paralympic Games
Equestrian
Gold medal – first place	2016 Rio de Janeiro	Individual freestyle test grade III
Gold medal – first place	2020 Tokyo	Individual championship test grade IV
Gold medal – first place	2020 Tokyo	Individual freestyle test grade IV
Silver medal – second place	2020 Tokyo	Team
Silver medal – second place	2024 Paris	Individual championship test grade IV
Silver medal – second place	2024 Paris	Team
Bronze medal – third place	2016 Rio de Janeiro	Team

Sanne Voets (born 17 September 1986) is a Dutch Paralympic equestrian. She is gold medalled at the 2016 Summer Paralympics and at the 2020 Summer Paralympics. Voets became also World Champion and European Champion and several times National Dutch Champion. She is the most successful -para-equestrian rider for The Netherlands in History.

Sanne Voets was the first rider who collaborated with a DJ to make a freestyle to music. On the music of DJ Armin van Buuren Voets won gold at the 2016 Paralympic Games in Rio de Janeiro.

== Para-Dressage results ==
=== Paralympic Games ===
Event	Team	Individual	Freestyle	Horse
(United Kingdom) London 2012	4th	5th	4th	Vedet PB
(Brazil) Rio de Janeiro 2016	2nd place, silver medalist(s)	4th	1st place, gold medalist(s)	Demantur
(Japan) Tokyo 2020	2nd place, silver medalist(s)	1st place, gold medalist(s)	1st place, gold medalist(s)	Demantur

=== World Championships ===
Event	Team	Individual	Freestyle	Horse
(France) 2014 Normandy	2nd place, silver medalist(s)	2nd place, silver medalist(s)	1st place, gold medalist(s)	Vedet PB
(United States) 2018 Tryon	1st place, gold medalist(s)	1st place, gold medalist(s)	1st place, gold medalist(s)	Demantur
(Denmark) 2022 Herning	1st place, gold medalist(s)	1st place, gold medalist(s)	1st place, gold medalist(s)	Demantur

=== European Championships ===
Event	Team	Individual	Freestyle	Horse
(Belgium) 2011 Moorsele	4th	6th	3rd place, bronze medalist(s)	Vedet PB
(Denmark) 2013 Herning	1st place, gold medalist(s)	2nd place, silver medalist(s)	1st place, gold medalist(s)	Vedet PB
(France) 2015 Deauville	2nd place, silver medalist(s)	4th	4th	Vedet PB
(Sweden) 2017 Gothenburg	3rd place, bronze medalist(s)	1st place, gold medalist(s)	3rd place, bronze medalist(s)	Demantur
(Netherlands) 2019 Rotterdam	1st place, gold medalist(s)	1st place, gold medalist(s)	1st place, gold medalist(s)	Demantur
(Germany) 2023 Riesenbeck	1st place, gold medalist(s)	2nd place, silver medalist(s)	2nd place, silver medalist(s)	Demantur
