= Equestrian events at the 2024 Summer Paralympics =

Equestrian at the XVII Paralympic Games
- The pictogram for para-equestrian dressage
- Venue: Château de Versailles
- Dates: 3–7 September 2024
- No. of events: 11
- Competitors: 76 from 30 nations

Equestrian events at the 2024 Summer Paralympics in Paris, France are held at the Château de Versailles. There are eleven gender free events: ten individual events and one mixed team event.

== Competition format ==
Teams are made of three athletes, all of whom are also competing for individual medals. Nations without a team can be represented by one or two individual athlete(s).

The para-dressage competition starts with the Grand Prix Test A, which serves as an individual competition and in which the first individual medals are awarded. The best first 8 (eight) riders from each grade are qualified for the individual Freestyle. The second test, the Grand Prix Test B counts as Team test which serves as team competition where the team medals will be awarded. Only nations with a team can compete in the Grand Prix test B competition. The Freestyle consist of the best 8 (eight) athletes from the Grand Prix Test A competition, where again a string of three medals in each grade will be awarded. Each athlete designs their own test for the Freestyle, which must be set to music and must contain compulsory movements.

== Qualification ==
There are 78 spots for para-equestrian riders at the Paralympic Games. Teams in each discipline consisted of three horse and rider pairs; any NOC that qualified a team (15 in total) also received 3 entries in the individual competition for that discipline. NOCs that did not qualify teams could earn one or two individual spots in dressage. Teams qualify primarily through specific competitions (World Equestrian Games and continental tournaments), while individuals qualified through ranking. The host nation France automatically reserves a team spot.

| Means of qualification | Date | Venue | Berths | Qualified |
Team slots
| 2022 FEI World Championships | 6–14 August 2022 | (Denmark) Herning | 7 highest ranked teams 28 athletes | Netherlands; Denmark; United States; Great Britain; Belgium; Germany; Italy |
| 2023 FEI European Championships | 4–10 September 2023 | (Germany) Riesenbeck | 1 | Sweden |
| FEI Para Equestrian Regional Team Ranking Allocation | 1 January – 31 December 2023 | | Africa ~~(1 team quota)~~ | — |
| FEI Para Equestrian Regional Team Ranking Allocation | 1 January – 31 December 2023 | | Americas (1 team quota) | Canada |
| FEI Para Equestrian Regional Team Ranking Allocation | 1 January – 31 December 2023 | | Asia (1 team quota) | Singapore |
| FEI Para Equestrian Regional Team Ranking Allocation | 1 January – 31 December 2023 | | Oceania (1 team quota) | Australia |
| FEI Para Equestrian Team Ranking List Allocation | 1 January – 31 December 2023 | | 2 highest ranked teams 8 athletes | Austria; Norway |
| Reallocation of African regional quota | 1 January – 31 December 2023 | | | Ireland |
| Host country allocation | 13 September 2017 | (Peru) Lima | 4 | France |
Individual qualification
| Para Equestrian Individual Ranking List | 1 January – 31 December 2023 | — | 15 | Latvia; Brazil; Hong Kong; Poland; Finland; Hungary; Brazil; Czech Republic; Finland; South Africa; Slovakia; Switzerland; Japan; Japan; Poland |
| Bipartite Commission Invitation Allocation | 18 March 2024 | — | 3 | Greece; Finland; Czech Republic |
| Additional spots | 5 August 2024 | — | 3 | Saudi Arabia; New Zealand; Mexico |
| Total | | | 78 | |

== Officials ==
Appointment of officials is as follows:

Dressage

- (France) Anne Prain (Ground Jury President)
- (United States) Kristi Wysocki (Ground Jury Member)
- (Belgium) Freddy Leyman (Ground Jury Member)
- (Netherlands) Ineke Jansen (Ground Jury Member)
- (Australia) Suzanne Cunningham (Ground Jury Member)
- (United Kingdom) John Robinson (Ground Jury Member)
- (Italy) Katherine Lucheschi (Ground Jury Member)
- (Germany) Jan Holger Holtschmit (Technical Delegate)

== Events ==
Equestrian events at the 2024 Summer Paralympics – Classification of events
| DATE | SESSION | EVENT | GRADE |
| 2 September 2024 | 08:00:00 | Horse Inspection | |
| 3 September 2024 | 09:00:00 | Individual Championship Test | Grade III |
| | | Individual Championship Test | Grade II |
| | | Individual Championship Test | Grade I |
| 4 September 2024 | 10:00:00 | Individual Championship Test | Grade IV |
| | | Individual Championship Test | Grade V |
| 6 September 2024 | 09:30:00 | Team Test | Grade IV |
| | | Team Test | Grade V |
| | | Team Test | Grade I |
| | | Team Test | Grade II |
| | | Team Test | Grade III |
| 7 September 2024 | 09:30:00 | Individual Freestyle Test | Grade III |
| | | Individual Freestyle Test | Grade IV |
| | | Individual Freestyle Test | Grade II |
| | | Individual Freestyle Test | Grade I |
| | | Individual Freestyle Test | Grade III |

== Participating nations ==
76 athletes from 30 nations competed.

- Australia (4)
- Austria (4)
- Belgium (4)
- Brazil (2)
- Canada (3)
- Czech Republic (2)
- Denmark (4)
- Finland (3)
- France (4)
- Germany (4)
- Great Britain (4)
- Greece (1)
- Hong Kong (1)
- Hungary (1)
- Ireland (4)
- Italy (4)
- Japan (2)
- Saudi Arabia (1)
- Latvia (1)
- Mexico (1)
- Netherlands (4)
- Norway (4)
- New Zealand (1)
- Poland (1)
- South Africa (1)
- Singapore (3)
- Slovakia (1)
- Sweden (4)
- Switzerland (1)
- United States (4)

== Medal table ==
* Host nation (France)

| Rank | NPC | Gold | Silver | Bronze | Total |
|---|---|---|---|---|---|
| 1 | United States | 5 | 1 | 1 | 7 |
| 2 | Netherlands | 2 | 4 | 0 | 6 |
| 3 | Belgium | 2 | 0 | 0 | 2 |
| 3 | Latvia | 2 | 0 | 0 | 2 |
| 5 | Germany | 0 | 3 | 3 | 6 |
| 6 | Great Britain | 0 | 1 | 6 | 7 |
| 7 | Italy | 0 | 1 | 1 | 2 |
| 8 | Denmark | 0 | 1 | 0 | 1 |
| Totals (8 entries) | | 11 | 11 | 11 | 33 |

== Medalists ==
| Event | Class | Gold | Silver | Bronze |
|---|---|---|---|---|
| Individual championship test | Grade I | Rihards Snikus on King of the Dance (LAT) | Roxanne Trunnell on Fan Tastico H (USA) | Sara Morganti on Mariebelle (ITA) |
| Individual freestyle test | Grade I | Rihards Snikus on King of the Dance (LAT) | Sara Morganti on Mariebelle (ITA) | Mari Durward-Akhurst on Athene Lindebjerg (GBR) |
| Individual championship test | Grade II | Fiona Howard on Diamond Dunes (USA) | Katrine Kristensen on Goerklintgaards Quater (DEN) | Georgina Wilson on Sakura (GBR) |
| Individual freestyle test | Grade II | Fiona Howard on Diamond Dunes (USA) | Georgina Wilson on Sakura (GBR) | Heidemarie Dresing on Dooloop (GER) |
| Individual championship test | Grade III | Rebecca Hart on Floratina (USA) | Rixt van der Horst on Royal Fonq (NED) | Natasha Baker on Dawn Chorus (GBR) |
| Individual freestyle test | Grade III | Rebecca Hart on Floratina (USA) | Rixt van der Horst on Royal Fonq (NED) | Natasha Baker on Dawn Chorus (GBR) |
| Individual championship test | Grade IV | Demi Haerkens on Daula (NED) | Sanne Voets on Demantur (NED) | Anna-Lena Niehues on Quimbaya 6 (GER) |
| Individual freestyle test | Grade IV | Demi Haerkens on Daula (NED) | Anna-Lena Niehues on Quimbaya 6 (GER) | Kate Shoemaker on Vianne (USA) |
| Individual championship test | Grade V | Michèle George on Best of 8 (BEL) | Regine Mispelkamp on Highlander Delight's (GER) | Sophie Wells on LJT Egebjerggards Samoa (GBR) |
| Individual freestyle test | Grade V | Michèle George on Best of 8 (BEL) | Regine Mispelkamp on Highlander Delight's (GER) | Sophie Wells on LJT Egebjerggards Samoa (GBR) |
| Team | Open | United States; Rebecca Hart on Floratina; Fiona Howard on Diamond Dunes; Roxanne Trunnell on Fan Tastico H | Netherlands; Demi Haerkens on Daula; Rixt van der Horst on Royal Fonq; Sanne Voets on Demantur | Germany; Heidemarie Dresing on Dooloop; Regine Mispelkamp on Highlander Delight's; Anna-Lena Niehues on Quimbaya 6 |

== See also ==
- Equestrian events at the 2024 Summer Olympics
