= Equestrian at the 2024 Summer Paralympics – Individual championship test grade II =

Equestrian – Individual championship test, grade II at the XVII Paralympic Games
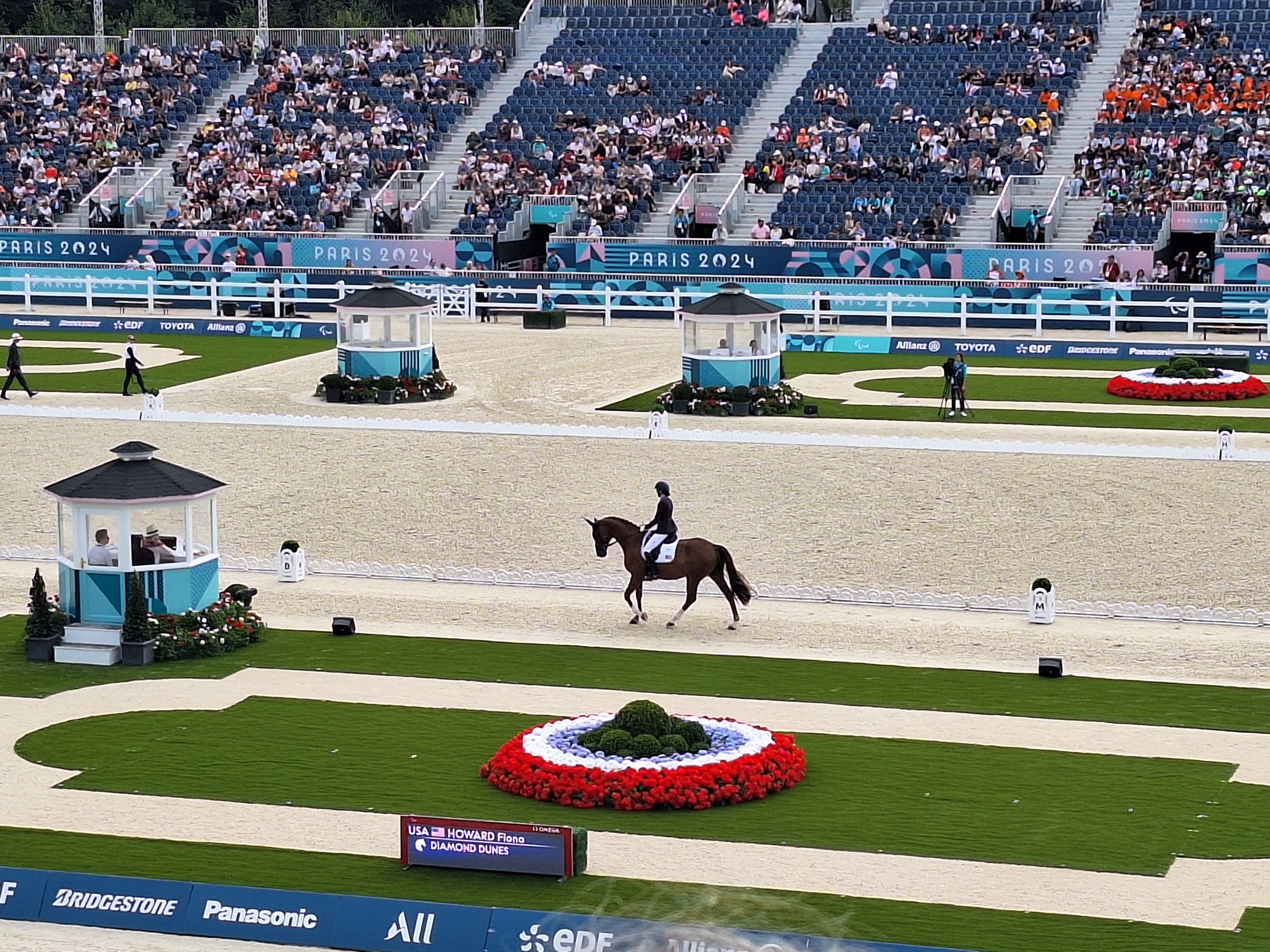
- Fiona Howard on Diamond Dunes in her gold medal winning test.
- Venue: Palace of Versailles
- Date: 3 September 2024
- Competitors: 9 from 8 nations
- Winning score: 76.931

Medalists
1st place, gold medalist(s)		Fiona Howard riding Diamond Dunes	United States
2nd place, silver medalist(s)		Katrine Kristensen riding Goerklintgaards	Denmark
3rd place, bronze medalist(s)		Georgia Wilson riding Sakura	Great Britain

The individual championship test, grade II, para-equestrian dressage event at the 2024 Summer Paralympics was held on 3 September, 2024 at the Palace of Versailles in Paris.

The competition was assessed by a ground jury composed of five judges placed at locations designated E, H, C, M, and B. Each judge rated the competitors' performances with a percentage score. The five scores from the jury were then averaged to determine a rider's total percentage score.

== Classification ==
Grade II riders are described by the IPC as "athletes have either a severe impairment of the trunk and minimal impairment of the arms or moderate impairment of the trunk, arms, and legs". such athletes will commonly require a wheelchair in daily life.

== Results ==
Riders performed one test apiece. In addition to being an event in its own right, the Championship test was the qualification round for the Freestyle event, with the top eight riders progressing to the second final. 22 Riders started the event.

Rank	Rider Horse	Nation	Scores					Total	FSQ
Rank	Rider Horse	Nation	E	H	C	M	B	Total	FSQ
1st place, gold medalist(s)	Fiona Howard riding Diamond Dunes	United States (USA)	77.414	76.379	75.690	78.621	76.552	76.931	Q
2nd place, silver medalist(s)	Katrine Kristensen riding Goerklintgaards	Denmark (DEN)	76.034	72.069	73.276	74.483	73.966	73.966	Q
3rd place, bronze medalist(s)	Georgia Wilson riding Sakura	Great Britain (GBR)	75.000	72.759	73.276	73.103	72.931	73.414	Q
4	Heidemarie Dresing riding Dooloop	Germany (GER)	71.724	73.966	70.517	73.103	76.207	73.103	Q
5	Pepo Puch riding Sailor's Blue	Austria (AUT)	75.000	70.000	72.759	73.103	73.103	72.793	Q
6	Roberta Sheffield riding Fairuza	Canada (CAN)	69.655	70.862	68.448	70.345	72.414	70.345	Q
7	Bridget Murphy riding Penmain Promise	Australia (AUS)	66.724	66.379	66.552	66.552	67.414	66.724	Q
8	Sho Inaba riding Huzette BH	Japan (JPN)	60.000	61.897	62.069	66.379	58.448	61.759	Q
9	Soshi Yoshigoe riding Cleverboy	Japan (JPN)	62.586	62.586	60.345	61.724	61.379	61.724	
