= Equestrian at the 2024 Summer Paralympics – Individual freestyle test grade II =

Equestrian – Individual freestyle test, grade II at the XVII Paralympic Games
- Venue: Palais de Versailles
- Date: 7 September 2024
- Competitors: 8 from 8 nations
- Winning score: 81.99

Medalists
1st place, gold medalist(s)		Fiona Howard on Diamond Dunes	United States
2nd place, silver medalist(s)		Georgia Wilson on Sakura	Great Britain
3rd place, bronze medalist(s)		Heidemarie Dresing on Dooloop	Germany

The individual freestyle test, grade II, para-equestrian dressage event at the 2024 Summer Paralympics was contested on the afternoon of 7 September 2024 at the Olympic Equestrian Centre in Rio de Janeiro.

The competition was assessed by a ground jury composed of five judges placed at locations designated E, H, C, M, and B. Each judge rated the competitors' performances with a percentage score across two areas - technique and artistry. The ten scores from the jury were then averaged to determine a rider's total percentage score.

== Ground jury ==
Judge at E	Hanneke Gerritsen ( Netherlands)
Judge at H	Anne Prain ( France)
Judge at C	Sarah Leitch ( Great Britain), jury president
Judge at M	Marc Urban ( Belgium)
Judge at B	Alison King ( Hong Kong)

== Results ==
Rank	Rider Horse	Nationality	Section	E	H	C	M	B	Avg	Result
1st place, gold medalist(s)	Fiona Howard; Diamond Dunes	United States		84.33	81.33	82.17	80.87	81.27		81.99
1st place, gold medalist(s)	Fiona Howard; Diamond Dunes	United States	Tech.	78.67	78.67	78.33	77.33	77.33	78.07	81.99
1st place, gold medalist(s)	Fiona Howard; Diamond Dunes	United States	Art.	90.00	84.00	86.00	84.40	85.20	85.92	81.99
2nd place, silver medalist(s)	Georgia Wilson; Sakura	Great Britain		79.97	81.83	79.63	78.00	77.43		79.37
2nd place, silver medalist(s)	Georgia Wilson; Sakura	Great Britain	Tech.	75.33	79.67	75.67	74.00	72.67	75.47	79.37
2nd place, silver medalist(s)	Georgia Wilson; Sakura	Great Britain	Art.	84.60	84.00	83.60	82.00	82.20	83.28	79.37
3rd place, bronze medalist(s)	Heidemarie Dresing; Dooloop	Germany		75.73	74.00	78.70	75.93	76.27		76.13
3rd place, bronze medalist(s)	Heidemarie Dresing; Dooloop	Germany	Tech.	72.67	72.00	75.00	70.67	73.33	72.73	76.13
3rd place, bronze medalist(s)	Heidemarie Dresing; Dooloop	Germany	Art.	78.80	76.00	82.40	81.20	79.20	79.52	76.13
4	Katrine Kristensen; Goerklintgaards Quater	Denmark		72.40	76.67	78.70	78.70	71.97		75.69
4	Katrine Kristensen; Goerklintgaards Quater	Denmark	Tech.	70.00	74.33	75.00	73.00	68.33	72.13	75.69
4	Katrine Kristensen; Goerklintgaards Quater	Denmark	Art.	74.80	79.00	82.40	84.40	75.60	79.24	75.69
5	Pepo Puch; Sailor'S Blue	Austria		76.67	74.17	73.90	73.23	72.67		74.13
5	Pepo Puch; Sailor'S Blue	Austria	Tech.	72.33	72.33	71.00	69.67	67.33	70.53	74.13
5	Pepo Puch; Sailor'S Blue	Austria	Art.	81.00	76.00	76.80	76.80	78.00	77.72	74.13
6	Roberta Sheffield; Fairuza	Canada		74.43	72.83	72.30	72.20	74.17		73.19
6	Roberta Sheffield; Fairuza	Canada	Tech.	71.67	70.67	70.00	71.00	71.33	70.93	73.19
6	Roberta Sheffield; Fairuza	Canada	Art.	77.20	75.00	74.60	73.40	77.00	75.44	73.19
7	Bridget Murphy; Penmain Promise	Australia		70.87	69.83	71.80	66.77	71.50		70.15
7	Bridget Murphy; Penmain Promise	Australia	Tech.	69.33	69.67	69.00	64.33	68.00	68.07	70.15
7	Bridget Murphy; Penmain Promise	Australia	Art.	72.40	70.00	74.60	69.20	75.00	72.24	70.15
8	Sho Inaba; Huzette Bh	Japan		68.13	66.17	65.53	68.30	63.13		66.25
8	Sho Inaba; Huzette Bh	Japan	Tech.	65.67	64.33	63.67	68.00	60.67	64.47	66.25
8	Sho Inaba; Huzette Bh	Japan	Art.	70.60	68.00	67.40	68.60	65.60	68.04	66.25
