= Equestrian at the 2024 Summer Paralympics – Individual championship test grade I =

Equestrian – Individual championship test, grade I at the XVII Paralympic Games
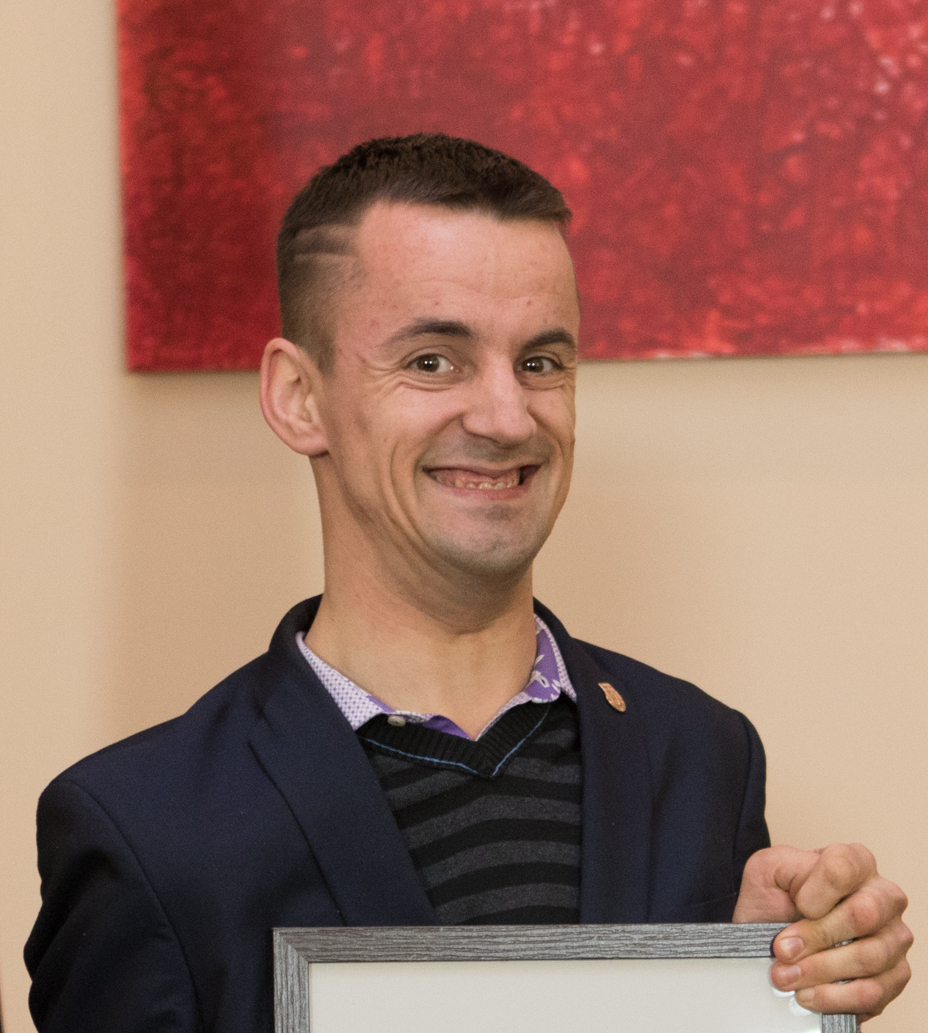
- Gold medalist in Grade I test, Rihards Snikus of Latvia.
- Venue: Palace of Versailles
- Date: 3 September 2024
- Competitors: 22 from 18 nations
- Winning score: 79.167

Medalists
| 1st place, gold medalist(s) | | Rihards Snikus riding King Of The Dance | Latvia |
| 2nd place, silver medalist(s) | | Roxanne Trunnell riding Fan Tastico H | United States |
| 3rd place, bronze medalist(s) | | Sara Morganti riding Mariebelle | Italy |

The individual championship test, grade I, para-equestrian dressage event at the 2024 Summer Paralympics was held on 3 September, 2024 at the Palace of Versailles in Paris.

The competition was assessed by a ground jury composed of five judges placed at locations designated E, H, C, M, and B. Each judge rated the competitors' performances with a percentage score. The five scores from the jury were then averaged to determine a rider's total percentage score.

== Classification ==
Grade I riders are described by the IPC as "athletes have severe impairments affecting all limbs and the trunk". such athletes will commonly require a wheelchair in daily life, and compete in walking only.

== Results ==
Riders performed one test apiece. In addition to being an event in its own right, the Championship test was the qualification round for the Freestyle event, with the top eight riders progressing to the second final. 22 Riders started the event.

| Rank | Rider Horse | Nation | Scores | | | | | Total | FSQ |
| Rank | Rider Horse | Nation | E | H | C | M | B | Total | FSQ |
|---|---|---|---|---|---|---|---|---|---|
| 1st place, gold medalist(s) | Rihards Snikus riding King Of The Dance | Latvia | 82.292 | 75.625 | 77.292 | 79.583 | 81.042 | 79.167 | Q |
| 2nd place, silver medalist(s) | Roxanne Trunnell riding Fan Tastico H | United States | 80.208 | 75.625 | 77.292 | 77.917 | 78.958 | 78.000 | Q |
| 3rd place, bronze medalist(s) | Sara Morganti riding Mariebelle | Italy | 74.167 | 72.292 | 77.917 | 78.750 | 70.000 | 74.625 | Q |
| 4 | Annemarieke Nobel riding Doo | Netherlands | 72.292 | 74.583 | 72.708 | 73.542 | 70.833 | 72.792 | Q |
| 5 | Laurentia Tan riding Hickstead | Singapore | 72.708 | 75.000 | 73.542 | 69.375 | 69.375 | 72.000 | Q |
| 6 | Mari Durward-Akhurst riding Athene Lindebjerg | Great Britain | 70.833 | 71.875 | 73.750 | 73.750 | 68.750 | 71.792 | Q |
| 7 | Carola Semperboni riding Paul | Italy | 72.917 | 69.792 | 72.083 | 70.417 | 73.333 | 71.708 | Q |
| 8 | Stella Barton riding Lord Larmarque | Australia | 70.208 | 69.583 | 74.167 | 68.333 | 71.875 | 70.833 | Q |
| 9 | Michael Murphy riding Cleverboy | Ireland | 67.500 | 72.708 | 70.833 | 71.875 | 69.167 | 70.417 | |
| 10 | Julia Sciancalepore riding Heinrich IX | Austria | 67.917 | 71.458 | 66.875 | 70.208 | 68.125 | 68.917 | |
| 11 | Gemma Rose Jen Foo riding Banestro | Singapore | 71.042 | 67.917 | 68.125 | 71.667 | 65.833 | 68.917 | |
| 12 | Austen Burns riding Happy Feet 3 | Canada | 67.292 | 65.833 | 70.833 | 70.833 | 68.542 | 68.667 | |
| 13 | Anita Johnsson riding Currant La | Sweden | 64.583 | 67.292 | 68.542 | 70.417 | 68.125 | 67.792 | |
| 14 | Anastasja Vistalova riding First Love | Czech Republic | 66.875 | 66.458 | 67.292 | 64.375 | 71.042 | 67.208 | |
| 15 | Pui Ting Natasha Tse riding Juno's Whispering Angel | Hong Kong | 70.208 | 67.292 | 65.208 | 67.292 | 64.167 | 66.833 | |
| 16 | Sergio Froes Ribeiro-De-Oliva riding Milenium | Brazil | 67.083 | 63.750 | 65.833 | 67.917 | 68.750 | 66.667 | |
| 17 | Jody Schloss riding El Colorado | Canada | 65.833 | 66.250 | 62.708 | 68.333 | 68.750 | 66.375 | |
| 18 | Michail Kalarakis riding Eros CS | Greece | 62.083 | 67.500 | 67.500 | 67.708 | 66.458 | 66.250 | |
| 19 | Lucia Vladovicova riding Sterngreifer | Slovakia | 63.125 | 64.583 | 64.375 | 64.167 | 66.250 | 64.500 | |
| 20 | Vladimir Votrel riding Ruby Beatle | Czech Republic | 63.125 | 58.958 | 61.667 | 62.917 | 61.042 | 61.542 | |
| 21 | Jens Lasse Dokkan riding Aladdin | Norway | 56.250 | 59.792 | 60.000 | 59.375 | 54.375 | 57.958 | |
| 22 | Katja Karjalainen riding Kameo | Finland | 57.500 | 57.917 | 54.583 | 56.667 | 52.917 | 55.917 | |
