= Stella Barton =

Australian para-equestrian)

Personal information
- Born: 30 May 1999 (age 27)

Sport
- Country: Australia
- Sport: Para-equestrian

Stella Barton (born 30 May 1999) is an Australian para-equestrian. She competed at the 2024 Paris Paralympics.

== Personal ==
Barton was born on 30 May 1999. She was born with cerebral palsy that affects her four limbs. When out in the community she uses a wheelchair. She attended Shelford Girls' Grammar and has completed an arts degree at Swinburne University of Technology.

Barton's great, great, great uncle was Edmund Barton, Australia's first prime minister.

Barton is a member of the Australian Greens.

== Equestrian ==
She started riding at the age of seven at the police stables in South Melbourne, where a Riding for the Disabled Association Centre is based. She competes as an Australian Grade 1 Para Dressage rider. In 2023, three-time Paralympian Sharon Jarvis offered her own horse, Lord Larmarque, aka ‘Bug’, for training and competitions. Her sporting highlight was competing at 2023 Hartpury Festival of Dressage in England.

At the 2024 Paris Paralympics, she finished seventh in the Dressage individual team test grade I and eight in Individual championship test grade I. She was a member of the Australian team that finished 12th in the Team event.

In 2024, she is a Victorian Institute of Sport scholarship athlete.
