= Equestrian events at the 2020 Summer Paralympics =

Equestrian at the XVI Paralympic Games
- Equestrian pictogram of the 2020 Summer Paralympics
- Venue: Tokyo Equestrian Park; Setagaya, Tokyo, Japan
- Dates: 25–30 August 2021
- Competitors: 78 in 11 events

Equestrian events at the 2020 Summer Paralympics in Tokyo, Japan were held at the Tokyo Equestrian Park. There were eleven gender free events taking place: ten individual events and one mixed team event.

The 2020 Summer Olympic and Paralympic Games were postponed to 2021 due to the COVID-19 pandemic. They kept the 2020 name and were held from 24 August to 5 September 2021.

== Qualification ==
Qualification was held from 1 January 2018 to 31 January 2020.

- An NPC is allowed to have a maximum of four qualification slots:
  - One eligible team of four athletes and minimum of three or maximum of four per individual events can contest.
  - At least one athlete must be eligible to be in sport classes grade I, grade II or grade III.

| Means of qualification | Date | Venue | Berths | Qualified |
Team slots
| 2018 FEI World Equestrian Games | 11–23 September 2018 | (United States) Tryon | 3 top ranked teams 12 athletes | Netherlands (NED); Great Britain (GBR); Germany (GER) |
| FEI Para Equestrian Team Ranking List Allocation | 1 January 2019 – 31 January 2020 | - | 7 highest ranked teams 28 athletes | United States (USA); Austria (AUT); Belgium (BEL); Denmark (DEN); Italy (ITA); Sweden (SWE); RPC (RUS) |
| Para Equestrian Regional Team Ranking Allocation | 1 January 2019 – 31 January 2020 | - | Africa (1 team quota) | — |
| Para Equestrian Regional Team Ranking Allocation | 1 January 2019 – 31 January 2020 | - | Americas (1 team quota) | Canada (CAN) |
| Para Equestrian Regional Team Ranking Allocation | 1 January 2019 – 31 January 2020 | - | Asia (1 team quota) | Singapore (SGP) |
| Para Equestrian Regional Team Ranking Allocation | 1 January 2019 – 31 January 2020 | - | Oceania (1 team quota) | Australia (AUS) |
Individual qualification
| Para Equestrian Individual Ranking List Allocation; Regional Distribution | 1 January 2019 – 31 January 2020 | — | 13 | Brazil (BRA); Brazil (BRA); Hong Kong (HKG); Hong Kong (HKG); New Zealand (NZL); New Zealand (NZL); South Africa (RSA); South Africa (RSA); Finland (FIN); Latvia (LAT); Norway (NOR); Mexico (MEX); Saudi Arabia (KSA) |
| Bipartite Invitation Allocation | 16 March 2020 | — | 3 | Finland (FIN); France (FRA); Hong Kong (HKG) |
| Host Country Allocation | 7 September 2013 | (Argentina) Buenos Aires | 4 | Japan (JPN) |
| Reallocation | — | — | 6 | Czech Republic (CZE); France (FRA); Ireland (IRL); Switzerland (SUI); Poland (POL); Portugal (POR) |
| Total | | | 78 | |

== Officials ==
Appointment of officials is as follows:

Dressage

- (Germany) Marco Orsini (Ground Jury President)
- (Netherlands) Jeannette Wolfs (Ground Jury Member)
- (France) Anne Prain (Ground Jury Member) - replaced (Hong Kong) Alison Pauline King
- (Norway) Kjell Myhre (Ground Jury Member)
- (Italy) Katherine Lucheschi (Ground Jury Member)
- (Belgium) Marc Urban (Ground Jury Member) - replaced (Australia) Suzanne Cunningham
- (United Kingdom) Sarah Leitch (Ground Jury Member)
- (Netherlands) Hanneke Gerritsen (Technical Delegate)

== Medal table ==
| Rank | Nation | Gold | Silver | Bronze | Total |
|---|---|---|---|---|---|
| 1 | Great Britain (GBR) | 3 | 3 | 2 | 8 |
| 2 | Netherlands (NED) | 2 | 2 | 2 | 6 |
| 3 | Belgium (BEL) | 2 | 0 | 2 | 4 |
| 4 | United States (USA) | 2 | 0 | 1 | 3 |
| 5 | Denmark (DEN) | 2 | 0 | 0 | 2 |
| 6 | Austria (AUT) | 0 | 2 | 0 | 2 |
| 6 | Latvia (LAT) | 0 | 2 | 0 | 2 |
| 8 | Brazil (BRA) | 0 | 1 | 0 | 1 |
| 8 | Sweden (SWE) | 0 | 1 | 0 | 1 |
| 10 | Italy (ITA) | 0 | 0 | 2 | 2 |
| 11 | Germany (GER) | 0 | 0 | 1 | 1 |
| 11 | Norway (NOR) | 0 | 0 | 1 | 1 |
| Totals (12 entries) | | 11 | 11 | 11 | 33 |

== Medalists ==
| Event | Class | Gold | Silver | Bronze |
|---|---|---|---|---|
| Individual championship test | I | Roxanne Trunnell on Dolton (USA) | Rihards Snikus on King of the Dance (LAT) | Sara Morganti on Royal Delight (ITA) |
| Individual freestyle test | I | Roxanne Trunnell on Dolton (USA) | Rihards Snikus on King of the Dance (LAT) | Sara Morganti on Royal Delight (ITA) |
| Individual championship test | II | Lee Pearson on Breezer (GBR) | Pepo Puch on Sailor's Blue (AUT) | Georgia Wilson on Sakura (GBR) |
| Individual freestyle test | II | Lee Pearson on Breezer (GBR) | Pepo Puch on Sailor's Blue (AUT) | Georgia Wilson on Sakura (GBR) |
| Individual championship test | III | Tobias Jorgensen on Jolene Hill (DEN) | Natasha Baker on Keystone Dawn Chorus (GBR) | Rixt van der Horst on Findsley (NED) |
| Individual freestyle test | III | Tobias Jorgensen on Jolene Hill (DEN) | Natasha Baker on Keystone Dawn Chorus (GBR) | Ann Cathrin Lübbe on La Costa Majlund (NOR) |
| Individual championship test | IV | Sanne Voets on Demantur (NED) | Rodolpho Riskalla on Don Henrico (BRA) | Manon Claeys on San Dior 2 (BEL) |
| Individual freestyle test | IV | Sanne Voets on Demantur (NED) | Louise Etzner Jakobsson on Goldstrike B.J. (SWE) | Manon Claeys on San Dior 2 (BEL) |
| Individual championship test | V | Michèle George on Best of 8 (BEL) | Sophie Wells on Don Cara M (GBR) | Frank Hosmar on Alphaville (NED) |
| Individual freestyle test | V | Michèle George on Best of 8 (BEL) | Frank Hosmar on Alphaville (NED) | Regine Mispelkamp on Highlander Delights (GER) |
| Team test to music | Open | Great Britain; Lee Pearson on Breezer; Natasha Baker on Keystone Dawn Chorus; Sophie Wells on Don Cara M | Netherlands; Frank Hosmar on Alphaville; Sanne Voets on Demantur; Rixt van der Horst on Findsley | United States; Roxanne Trunnell on Dolton; Rebecca Hart on El Corona Texel; Kate Shoemaker on Solitaer 40 |

== See also ==
- Equestrian events at the 2020 Summer Olympics
