= Denmark at the 2024 Summer Paralympics =

- Flag of Denmark
- IPC code: DEN
- NPC: Danish Paralympic Committee

in Paris, France August 28, 2024 – September 8, 2024
- Competitors: 32 in 9 sports
- Flag bearers: Tobias Jørgensen; Katrine Kristensen
- Medals Ranked 38th: Gold 2 Silver 3 Bronze 5 Total 10

Summer Paralympics appearances (overview)
- 1968; 1972; 1976; 1980; 1984; 1988; 1992; 1996; 2000; 2004; 2008; 2012; 2016; 2020; 2024

Denmark competed at the 2024 Summer Paralympics in Paris, France, from 28 August to 8 September.

== Medalists ==
Medal	Name	Sport	Event	Date
Gold	Alexander Hillhouse	Swimming	Men's 100m butterfly - S14	29 August
Gold	Emma Lund	Cycling	Women's T1-2 Road Race	7 September
Silver	Daniel Wagner	Athletics	Men's Long Jump –T63	31 August
Silver	Daniel Wagner	Athletics	Men's 100m - T63	2 September
Silver	Katrine Kristensen	Equestrian	Individual - Grade 2	3 September
Bronze	Lisa Gjessing	Taekwondo	Women's –65 kg	30 August
Bronze	Martin Black Jørgensen	Shooting	Men's 10m Air rifle - R1	31 August
Bronze	Emma Lund	Cycling	Women's T1-2 Individual Time Trial	4 September
Bronze	Peter Rosenmeier	Table tennis	Men's Singles - MS6	5 September
Bronze	Bjørk Nørremark	Athletics	Women's Long Jump - T47	6 September

== Competitors ==
The following is the list of number of competitors in the Games.

Sport	Men	Women	Total
Athletics	2	2	4
Badminton	0	1	1
Cycling	1	1	2
Equestrian	1	3	4
Shooting	5	0	5
Swimming	1	1	2
Table tennis	1	0	1
Taekwondo	0	1	1
Wheelchair rugby	11	1	12
Total	22	10	32

== Athletics ==
Danish track and field athletes achieved quota places for the following events based on their results at the 2023 World Championships, 2024 World Championships, or through high performance allocation, as long as they meet the minimum entry standard (MES).

Key

- Note–Ranks given for track events are within the athlete's heat only
- Q = Qualified for the next round
- q = Qualified for the next round as a fastest loser or, in field events, by position without achieving the qualifying target
- DQ = Disqualified
- PR = Paralympic Record
- AR = Area (or continental) Record
- NR = National Record
- SB = Season's Best
- PB = Personal Best
- N/A = Round not applicable for the event
- Bye = Athlete not required to compete in round

Track events

Athlete	Event	Heats		Final	
Athlete	Event	Time	Rank	Time	Rank
Daniel Wagner	Men's 100 m T63	12.21 PB	2 Q	12.08 PB	2nd place, silver medalist(s)
Christian Lykkeby Olsen	Men's 1500 m T46	—N/a		4:02.76	10

Field events

Athlete	Event	Final	
Athlete	Event	Distance	Position
Daniel Wagner	Men's long jump T63	7,39 m. PB	2nd place, silver medalist(s)
Bjørk Nørremark	Women's long jump T47	5,76 m. PB	3rd place, bronze medalist(s)
Emilie Aaen	Women's long jump T63	4.48 m.	7

== Badminton ==
Denmark has qualified one para badminton player for the following events, through the release of BWF para-badminton Race to Paris Paralympic Ranking.

Athlete	Event	Group stage			Quarterfinal	Semifinal	Final / BM	Rank
Athlete	Event	Opposition Score	Opposition Score	Rank	Opposition Score	Opposition Score	Opposition Score	Rank
Cathrine Rosengren	Women's singles SU5	Kameyama (JPN); W (21–6, 21–10)	Toyoda (JPN); W (21–17, 21–11)	1 Q	Beatriz Monteiro (POR); W (21–19, 21–10)	Yang Qiuxia (CHN); L (14–21, 14–21)	Manisha Ramadass (IND); L (12–21, 8–21)	4

== Cycling ==
Emma Lund and Martin Heggelund have both qualified to compete.

=== Road ===
Men

Athlete	Event	Time	Rank
Martin Heggelund	Men's road race T1-2	1:41.42 (+26.34)	12
Martin Heggelund	Men's time trial T1-2	33:25.24 (+11:49.46)	12

Women

Athlete	Event	Time	Rank
Emma Lund	Women's road race T1-2	1:00.16	1st place, gold medalist(s)
Emma Lund	Women's time trial T1-2	28:52.13 (+3:04.35)	3rd place, bronze medalist(s)

== Equestrian ==
Denmark entered a full squad of four para-equestrians into the Paralympic equestrian competition by finishing in the top seven nation's at the 2022 FEI World Championships in Herning, Denmark.

Individual

Athlete	Horse	Event	Total	
Athlete	Horse	Event	Score	Rank
Tobias Thorning Joergensen	Jolene Hill	Individual championship test grade III	Withdrew	
Tobias Thorning Joergensen	Jolene Hill	Individual freestyle test grade III	Withdrew	
Katrine Kristensen	Goerklintgaards Quater	Individual championship test grade II	73.966%	2nd place, silver medalist(s)
Katrine Kristensen	Goerklintgaards Quater	Individual freestyle test grade II	75.687%	4
Pia Wulff Jelstrup	Zafia	Individual championship test grade IV	68.861%	9
Pia Wulff Jelstrup	Zafia	Individual freestyle test grade IV	Did not advance	
Karla Dyhm-Junge	Miss Daisy	Individual championship test grade III	69.600%	6 Q
Karla Dyhm-Junge	Miss Daisy	Individual freestyle test grade III	73.367%	6

Team

Athlete	Horse	Event	Individual score	Total	
Athlete	Horse	Event	TT	Score	Rank
Tobias Thorning Joergensen	See above	Team	Withdrew	214.800%	8
Katrine Kristensen	See above	Team	75.200%	214.800%	8
Pia Wulff Jelstrup	See above	Team	70.000%	214.800%	8
Karla Dyhm-Junge	See above	Team	69.600%	214.800%	8

== Shooting ==
For the first time since 2016, Denmark entered two para-shooter's after achieved quota places for the following events by virtue of their best finishes at the 2022, 2023 and 2024 world cup, 2022 World Championships, 2023 World Championships, 2023 European Para Championships and 2024 European Championships, as long as they obtained a minimum qualifying score (MQS) by May 31, 2020.

Men

Athlete	Event	Qualification		Final	
Athlete	Event	Points	Rank	Points	Rank
Buster Mathias Antonsen	P1 Men's 10 metre air pistol SH1	563-17x	6	174.2	5
Jan Winther	R1 Men's 10 m air rifle standing SH1	621.0	4	164.0	6
Martin Black Jørgensen	R1 Men's 10 m air rifle standing SH1	621.8	2	226.5	3rd place, bronze medalist(s)
Jens Frimann	R7 Men's 50 metre rifle 3 positions SH1	1156-44x	8	430.6	4
Jan Winther	R7 Men's 50 metre rifle 3 positions SH1	1153-44x	9	Did not advance	

Mixed

Athlete	Event	Qualification		Final	
Athlete	Event	Points	Rank	Points	Rank
Kasper Hjort Lousdal	R6 – 50 m rifle prone SH1	626.1	4	121.9	8
Kasper Hjort Lousdal	R3 Mixed 10 m air rifle prone SH1	633.1	10	Did not advance	
Jan Winther	R3 Mixed 10 m air rifle prone SH1	630.4	19	Did not advance	
Buster Mathias Antonsen	P3 Mixed 25 metre pistol SH1	555-11x	20	Did not advance	
Buster Mathias Antonsen	P4 Mixed 50 metre pistol SH1	519-4x	20	Did not advance	
Jens Frimann	R6 Mixed 50 metre rifle prone SH1	615.8	23	Did not advance	

== Swimming ==
Denmark secured two quotas at the 2023 World Para Swimming Championships after finishing in the top two places in Paralympic class disciplines.

Athlete	Event	Heats		Final	
Athlete	Event	Result	Rank	Result	Rank
Alexander Hillhouse	Men's 200 m freestyle S14	1:58.42	4 q	1:57.96	6
Alexander Hillhouse	Men's 100 m backstroke S14	1:00.47	1 Q	59.38	5
Alexander Hillhouse	Men's 100 m butterfly S14	55.32	2 Q	54.61	1st place, gold medalist(s)
Johanne Øland Frøkjær	Women's 100 m backstroke S9	1:15.94	6	Did not advance	

== Table tennis ==
Denmark entered one athletes for the Paralympic games. Peter Rosenmeier qualified for the games through the allocations of the final ITTF world ranking.

Athlete	Event	Round of 16	Quarterfinal	Semifinal	Final	Rank
Athlete	Event	Opposition Score	Opposition Score	Opposition Score	Opposition Score	Rank
Peter Rosenmeier	Men's individual C6	Karabardak (GBR); W (11–5, 12–10, 11–6)	Thomas Rau (GER); W (13–11, 11–4, 10–12, 7–11, 12–10)	Rungroj Thainiyom (THA); L (12–10, 7–11, 15–17, 11–6, 8–11)	—N/a	3rd place, bronze medalist(s)

== Taekwondo ==
Denmark entered one athletes to compete at the Paralympics competition. Lisa Gjessing qualified for Paris 2024, by virtue of finishing within the top six in the Paralympic rankings in women's 65 kg class.

Athlete	Event	First round	Quarterfinal	Semifinal	Repechage	Final / BM	Rank
Athlete	Event	Opposition Result	Opposition Result	Opposition Result	Opposition Result	Opposition Result	Rank
Lisa Gjessing	Women's –65 kg	Tonowane (SOL); W 25–0	Djélika Diallo (FRA); L 4–6 (GP) (4–4)	—N/a	Beth Munro (GBR); W 10–2	Marie Antoinette Dassi (CMR); W 6–2	3rd place, bronze medalist(s)

== Wheelchair rugby ==
Denmark national wheelchair rugby team qualified for the Games after get the bronze medal and finishing top two eligible nation's at the 2023 European Championships Division A in Cardiff, Great Britain.

Team roster

- Kristian Bak Eriksen
- Kurt Busk Jensen
- Morten Elmholt
- Sebastian Frederiksen
- Leon Jorgensen
- Jesper Krueger
- Kaare Momme Nielsen
- Jakob Mortensen
- Thomas Pagh
- Mark Peters
- Mikkel Schottel
- Sofie Skoubo

Squad	Group stage				Semifinal	Final	Rank
Squad	Opposition Result	Opposition Result	Opposition Result	Rank	Opposition Result	Opposition Result	Rank
Denmark national team	France; L 51–53	Great Britain; L 53–55	Australia; L 49–53	4	Canada; L 46–56	Germany; W 56–49	7

== See also ==
- Denmark at the 2024 Summer Olympics
- Denmark at the Paralympics
