= Fiona Howard =

British-American Paralympic equestrian

Personal information
- Born: December 14, 1998 (age 27) England
- Home town: Boston, Massachusetts, U.S.
- Education: Northeastern University

Sport
- Country: United States
- Sport: Para equestrian
- Disability: Dystonia
- Disability class: Grade II
Medal record
Paralympics
Gold medal – first place	2024 Paris	Individual championship test grade II
Gold medal – first place	2024 Paris	Individual freestyle test grade II
Gold medal – first place	2024 Paris	Team
World Games
Gold medal – first place	2026 Aachen	Individual freestyle test grade II
Gold medal – first place	2026 Aachen	Team

Fiona Howard (born December 14, 1998) is a British-American para equestrian. She competes in Grade II para dressage. She represented the United States at the 2024 Summer Paralympics.

== Early life and education ==
Howard was born to an American mother and British father in England, and was raised in London. Starting when she was 11 and continuing into her teenage years, she faced a number of health problems. Issues with her bones inhibited walking. Her digestive system was impacted by bouts of scarlet fever and Lyme disease, resulting in the permanent use of a feeding tube. Howard immigrated to the United States in 2016 while pursuing medical treatment at Boston Children's Hospital.

She entered Northeastern University in 2017, and graduated in 2021 with a degree in psychology.

== Career ==
Howard began riding at age three, joining Pony Club at age three. As a child, she competed in reining. At age 14, Howard represented Great Britain at the 2013 FEI European Reining Championships for Juniors and Young Riders. She returned to the competition in 2016.

Following time away from the sport due to health issues, Howard resumed riding in college. She began competing in para dressage in 2021. In 2022 she competed as a Grade II para dressage athlete at the FEI Perrigo CPEDI3* at the Tryon Summer Dressage. In 2023 she and her horse, Jagger, came second in the Grade II event at the Adequan Global Dressage Festival Week 3 CPEDI3*.

Howard was named to the United States Paralympic equestrian team in July 2024. At the 2024 Summer Paralympics Howard won gold in the individual championship test grade II, the individual freestyle test grade II, and the team event with mount Diamond Dunes, whom she has worked with since early 2024.

Howard finished 2025 as the FEI's top para-dressage rider. The year also marked her first competition with Ferguston, a Hanoverian gelding.

In March 2026, Howard, with her coach's horse, Vianne, set three world records in Grade II (Grand Prix A, Grand Prix B, and Freestyle) at the Adequan Global Dressage Festival.

Howard and Diamond Dunes represented the U.S. Para Dressage Team in Grade II at the 2026 FEI World Championships in Aachen, Germany, taking gold in the individual freestyle test.

Since 2022 she has trained in Wellington, Florida with fellow para equestrian Kate Shoemaker. She also trains in Germany in the spring and summer.

== Personal life ==
Howard lives in Boston, Massachusetts. Outside of riding, she works remotely at Boston Children's Hospital as a clinical cardiac research assistant.

She was diagnosed with dystonia at age 19, and uses both crutches and wheelchair. She has a service dog named Elvis.

Fiona also lives in Wellington Florida, where she rides, works as a leader at her local church. She has also started swimming, participating in swim meets across palm beach county.
