= Equestrian at the 2024 Summer Paralympics – Individual freestyle test grade I =

Equestrian – Individual freestyle test, grade I at the XVII Paralympic Games
- Venue: Palais de Versailles
- Date: 7 September 2024
- Competitors: 8 from 7 nations
- Winning score: 82.49

Medalists
1st place, gold medalist(s)		Rihards Snikus on King Of The Dance	Latvia
2nd place, silver medalist(s)		Sara Morganti on Mariebelle	Italy
3rd place, bronze medalist(s)		Mari Durward-Akhurst on Athene Lindebjerg	Great Britain

The individual freestyle test, grade I, para-equestrian dressage event at the 2024 Summer Paralympics was contested on the afternoon of 7 September 2024 at the Palace of Versailles, Paris.

The competition was assessed by a ground jury composed of five judges placed at locations designated E, H, C, M, and B. Each judge rated the competitors' performances with a percentage score across two areas - technique and artistry. The ten scores from the jury were then averaged to determine a rider's total percentage score.

== Ground jury ==
Judge at E	Hanneke Gerritsen ( Netherlands)
Judge at H	Anne Prain ( France)
Judge at C	Sarah Leitch ( Great Britain), jury president
Judge at M	Marc Urban ( Belgium)
Judge at B	Alison King ( Hong Kong)

== Classification ==
Grade I riders are described by the IPC as " athletes [that] have severe impairments affecting all limbs and the trunk. ".

== Results ==
Riders performed one test apiece. Unlike the Championship test, riders and horses are marked on both technical ('Tech.') and artistic criteria ('Art.'). All five marks in both categories are then averaged for the final score. As with all freestyle finals, 8 Riders started the event.

Rank	Rider Horse	Nationality	Section	E	H	C	M	B	Avg	Result
1st place, gold medalist(s)	Rihards Snikus on King Of The Dance	Latvia		83.80	80.83	83.83	83.80	80.17		82.49
1st place, gold medalist(s)	Rihards Snikus on King Of The Dance	Latvia	Tech.	81.00	78.67	83.67	81.00	78.33	80.53	82.49
1st place, gold medalist(s)	Rihards Snikus on King Of The Dance	Latvia	Art.	86.60	83.00	84.00	86.60	82.00	84.44	82.49
2nd place, silver medalist(s)	Sara Morganti on Mariebelle	Italy		77.77	80.17	82.23	83.50	83.37		81.41
2nd place, silver medalist(s)	Sara Morganti on Mariebelle	Italy	Tech.	80.33	81.33	81.67	81.00	80.33	80.93	81.41
2nd place, silver medalist(s)	Sara Morganti on Mariebelle	Italy	Art.	78.40	79.00	82.80	86.00	86.40	82.52	81.41
3rd place, bronze medalist(s)	Mari Durward-Akhurst on Athene Lindebjerg	Great Britain		80.70	77.17	79.27	74.67	76.93		77.75
3rd place, bronze medalist(s)	Mari Durward-Akhurst on Athene Lindebjerg	Great Britain	Tech.	78.00	76.33	78.33	72.33	75.67	76.13	77.75
3rd place, bronze medalist(s)	Mari Durward-Akhurst on Athene Lindebjerg	Great Britain	Art.	83.40	78.00	80.20	77.00	78.20	79.36	77.75
4	Annemarieke Nobel on Doo Schufro	Netherlands		77.30	79.17	75.17	80.67	75.77		77.61
4	Annemarieke Nobel on Doo Schufro	Netherlands	Tech.	75.00	79.33	73.33	78.33	73.33	75.87	77.61
4	Annemarieke Nobel on Doo Schufro	Netherlands	Art.	79.60	79.00	77.00	83.00	78.20	79.36	77.61
5	Roxanne Trunnell on Fan Tastico H	United States		75.60	75.17	75.80	81.00	78.97		77.31
5	Roxanne Trunnell on Fan Tastico H	United States	Tech.	72.00	74.33	73.00	77.00	76.33	74.53	77.31
5	Roxanne Trunnell on Fan Tastico H	United States	Art.	79.20	76.00	78.60	85.00	81.60	80.08	77.31
6	Carola Semperboni on Paul	Italy		75.10	74.67	73.50	72.87	76.63		74.55
6	Carola Semperboni on Paul	Italy	Tech.	70.00	73.33	72.00	69.33	72.67	71.47	74.55
6	Carola Semperboni on Paul	Italy	Art.	80.20	76.00	75.00	76.40	80.60	77.64	74.55
7	Stella Barton on Lord Larmarque	Australia		74.13	70.17	77.67	73.13	74.70		73.96
7	Stella Barton on Lord Larmarque	Australia	Tech.	69.67	69.33	76.33	71.67	72.00	71.80	73.96
7	Stella Barton on Lord Larmarque	Australia	Art.	78.60	71.00	79.00	74.60	77.40	76.12	73.96
8	Laurentia Tan on Hickstead	Singapore		74.97	73.00	75.17	69.97	72.77		73.17
8	Laurentia Tan on Hickstead	Singapore	Tech.	71.33	71.00	71.33	68.33	70.33	70.47	73.17
8	Laurentia Tan on Hickstead	Singapore	Art.	78.60	75.00	79.00	71.60	75.20	75.88	73.17
