= Bridget Murphy =

Australian para-equestrian (born 1988)

Personal information
- Born: 2 August 1988 (age 38)

Sport
- Country: Australia
- Sport: Para-equestrian

Bridget Murphy (born 2 August 1988) is an Australian para-equestrian. She competed at the 2024 Summer Paralympics.

== Personal ==
Murphy was born on 2 August 1988. She has multiple pterygium syndrome and lives in Victoria. Murphy has a Bachelors Degree with Honours in Animal and Veterinary BioSciences from LaTrobe University.

== Equestrian ==
She started riding at age ten. She has a pony club instructor's certificate. She was encouraged to move into para-equestrian by Sharon Jarvis. She is classified as a Grade 2 rider which means her tests comprise walk and trot movement. She had the dream of competing at the 2020 Summer Paralympics but missed out on selection. Her horse at the 2024 Summer Paralympics will be Penmain Promise.

At the 2024 Paris Paralympics, she finished seventh on the Individual championship test grade II and Dressage individual team test grade II. She was a member of the Australian team that finished 12th in the Team event.

In 2024, she is a Victorian Institute of Sport scholarship athlete.
