= Heidemarie Dresing =

German para-equestrian (born 1955)

Personal information
- Nationality: German
- Born: 24 June 1955 (age 71) Hagen, West Germany

Sport
- Sport: Para-equestrian
Medal record
Para-equestrian
Representing Germany
Paralympic Games
Bronze medal – third place	2024 Paris	Individual freestyle test grade II
Bronze medal – third place	2024 Paris	Team
European Championships
Gold medal – first place	2023 Riesenbeck	Individual test grade II
Gold medal – first place	2023 Riesenbeck	Individual freestyle test grade II
Silver medal – second place	2023 Riesenbeck	Team para-dressage

Heidemarie Dresing (née Heidemann; born 24 June 1955) is a German dressage rider in para-equestrian. She was the oldest German para-athlete on the Paralympic team at the 2020 and 2024 Summer Paralympics, winning two bronze medals in the latter.

== Personal life ==
Dresing is a qualified architect by profession and comes from Hagen. In 2011, she was diagnosed with multiple sclerosis. At first, she continued to practice her profession until she retired for health reasons. In 2012, she moved to Rheda-Wiedenbrück.

Dresing has been riding since she was 10 years old and also breeds horses. She has been married since 2019.

== Career ==
Before her illness, Dresing took part in dressage riding tournaments in regular sport under her birth name Heidemarie Heidemann. Due to her illness, she can hardly move her left leg and arm at all and suffers from balance problems, as she herself said in her short portrait on ZDF in 2021. Despite the risk of frequent falls and associated injuries, she pursues her goals in para-equestrian sport.

At the German Championships in June 2019, Dresing won first place in the Grade II category on her horse Responsible for me with 145.671 points and became German Champion. She made her European Championship debut in 2019 in Rotterdam, where she took fourth place with her Hanoverian mare La Boum, born in 2013. At the Maimarkt tournament in Mannheim, she won the Nations Cup for Germany in May 2021 with Steffen Zeibig, Saskia Deutz and Regine Mispelkamp.

The highlight of her career was her participation in the 2020 Summer Paralympics in Tokyo, which took place in August 2021 due to the COVID-19 pandemic. At the competitions in the Tokyo Equestrian Park, she and La Boum narrowly missed the bronze medal in the individual ranking of the Grade II category with 72.295 points and achieved 4th place. She also took 4th place in the freestyle with 74.867 points behind Lee Pearson, Pepo Puch and Georgia Wilson. In the dressage team competition, she competed with Saskia Deutz and Regine Mispelkamp. The team achieved 215.036 points and thus 7th place. Dresing's share of this was 72.515 points.

At the 2022 German Para-Dressage Championships, Dresing won the gold medal in the Grade II category with La Boum with 149.68 points. This qualified her for the World Championships in Herning (Denmark), where she took 7th place with 70.970 points.

At the 2023 FEI European Dressage Championships in Riesenbeck, Dresing achieved 74.776 points in the individual Grand Prix A ranking and won the gold medal with her eleven-year-old Oldenburg horse Horse24Dooloop. She also received gold in the individual freestyle ranking with 80.353 points, again with Horse24Dooloop.

Dresing qualified to take part in the 2024 Summer Paralympics in Paris. She took part in the Grade II individual competition and in the team competition with her horse Dooloop and was the oldest athlete on the German Paralympic team. While she came fourth in the Championship Test Grade II individual competition with 73.103 points, she won the bronze medal in the team competition with Anna-Lena Niehues and Regine Mispelkamp with 223.751 points. She also received the bronze medal in the Grade II freestyle.
