= Equestrian at the 2024 Summer Paralympics – Team open =

Equestrian – Team competition at the XVII Paralympic Games
- Venue: Palace of Versailes
- Date: 6 September 2024
- Competitors: 18 from 6 nations
- Winning score: 235.567

Medalists
1st place, gold medalist(s)		Roxanne Trunnell on Fan Tastico H Fiona Howard on Diamond Dunes; Rebecca Hart on Floratina	United States
2nd place, silver medalist(s)		Sanne Voets on Demantur; Demi Haerkens on Daula; Rixt van der Horst on Royal Fonq	Netherlands
3rd place, bronze medalist(s)		Anna-Lena Niehues on Quimbaya 6 Regine Mispelkamp on Highlander Delight's; Heidemarie Dresing on Dooloop	Germany

The Para-equestrian team event was held on 6 September 2024 at the Palace of Versailles.

== Results ==
Six teams entered. Each team had three riders delivering a championship test, with the three final average scores combined to make a team score.

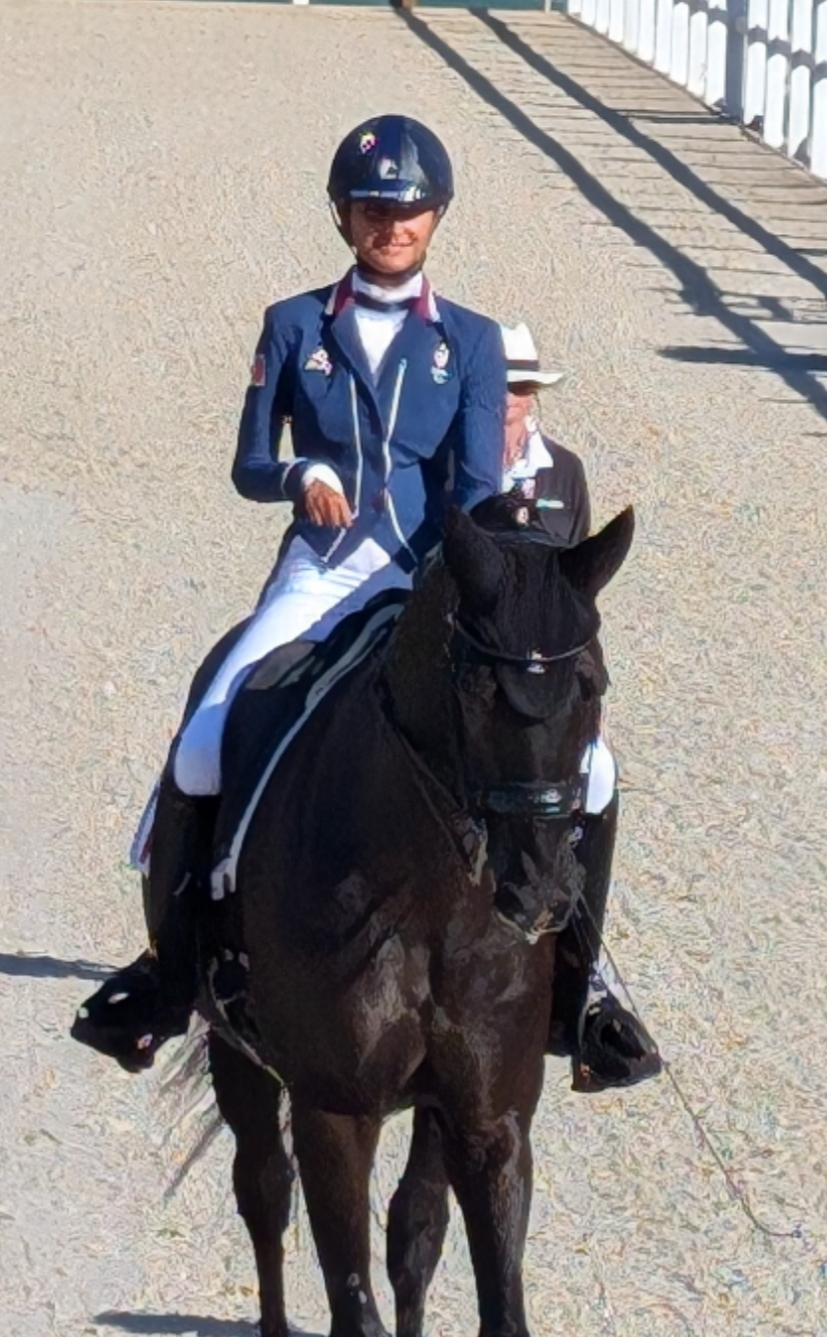
French equestrian Chiara Zenati at the 2024 Para-equestrian team event

Rank	Nation	Riders Horses	Grade	E	H	C	M	B	Total	Combined
1st place, gold medalist(s)	United States	Roxanne Trunnell on Fan Tastico H	I	78.542	73.542	78.542	74.583	79.792	77.000	235.567
1st place, gold medalist(s)	United States	Fiona Howard on Diamond Dunes	II	82.500	78.333	83.833	76.500	78.833	80.000	235.567
1st place, gold medalist(s)	United States	Rebecca Hart on Floratina	III	79.500	77.667	77.000	79.333	79.333	78.567	235.567
2nd place, silver medalist(s)	Netherlands	Sanne Voets on Demantur	IV	75.405	78.514	76.216	75.405	77.297	76.567	232.850
2nd place, silver medalist(s)	Netherlands	Demi Haerkens on Daula	IV	77.973	80.405	78.649	77.027	77.027	78.216	232.850
2nd place, silver medalist(s)	Netherlands	Rixt van der Horst on Royal Fonq	III	76.833	80.500	75.833	77.667	79.500	78.067	232.850
3rd place, bronze medalist(s)	Germany	Anna-Lena Niehues on Quimbaya 6	IV	74.865	76.081	77.162	73.514	75.135	75.351	223.751
3rd place, bronze medalist(s)	Germany	Regine Mispelkamp on Highlander Delight's	V	76.711	76.711	75.658	71.316	77.105	75.500	223.751
3rd place, bronze medalist(s)	Germany	Heidemarie Dresing on Dooloop	II	73.500	72.333	71.667	72.333	74.667	72.900	223.751
4	Italy	Sara Morganti on Mariebelle	I	78.333	82.292	80.625	78.333	77.708	79.458	223.166
4	Italy	Carola Semperboni on Paul	I	68.542	71.875	70.417	69.583	73.125	70.708	223.166
4	Italy	Francesca Salvade' on Escari	III	72.667	74.333	72.333	70.833	74.833	73.000	223.166
5	France	Alexia Pittier on Sultan 768	IV	72.297	70.946	74.730	69.595	71.892	71.892	220.506
5	France	Vladimir Vinchon on Pegase Mayenne	IV	73.919	75.405	76.216	76.081	73.784	75.081	220.506
5	France	Chiara Zenati on Swing Royal	III	74.500	72.167	69.500	77.167	74.333	73.533	220.506
6	Great Britain	Sophie Wells on Ljt Egebjerggards Samoa	V	73.158	67.895	69.868	73.421	70.132	70.895	219.562
6	Great Britain	Georgia Wilson on Sakura	II	73.333	72.333	73.500	73.833	73.500	73.300	219.562
6	Great Britain	Natasha Baker on Dawn Chorus	III	74.167	75.500	77.667	74.833	74.667	75.367	219.562
