= Rodolpho Riskalla =

Brazilian equestrian

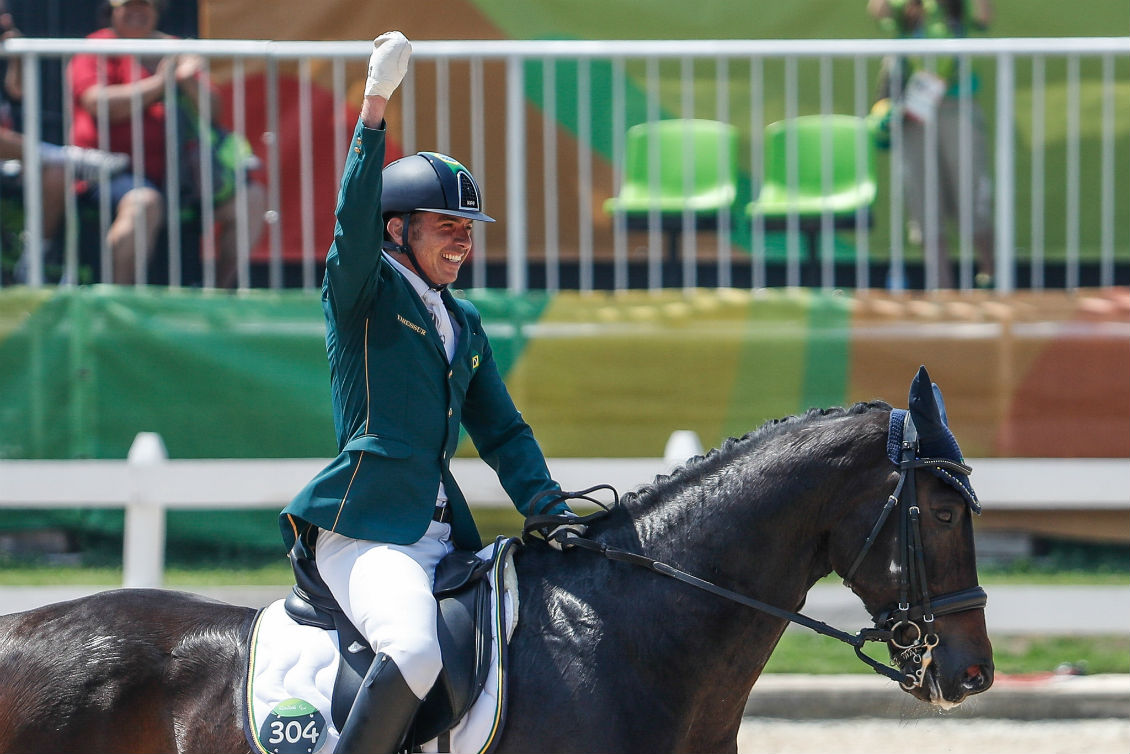
- Riskalla in 2016

Personal information
- Full name: Rodolpho Riskalla de Grande
- Born: 29 December 1984 (age 40); São Paulo, Brazil
Medal record
Equestrian
Representing Brazil
Paralympic Games
Silver medal – second place	2020 Tokyo	Ind. c'ship test grade IV

Rodolpho Riskalla de Grande (born 29 December 1984) is a Brazilian equestrian, who won silver in the individual championship test grade IV at the 2020 Summer Paralympics.
