= Roberta Sheffield =

Canadian Paralympic equestrian

Personal information
- Born: November 3, 1980 (age 46) Lincolnshire, United Kingdom

Sport
- Country: Canada
- Sport: Para-equestrian
- Disability class: Grade IV (until 2018); Grade III

Roberta 'Bert' Sheffield (born November 3, 1980) is a British-Canadian Para-equestrian, who has competed for Canada at international competitions including the Paralympics.

== Early life and education ==
Sheffield has had dual citizenship with the United Kingdom and Canada since birth. She was born in the UK to a Canadian mother. She began riding at age five at Gaddesden Place Riding for the Disabled Association Centre.

Sheffield has lived with rheumatoid arthritis since the age of 15. She read politics and public policy at Aston University.

== Career ==
Sheffield joined the Canadian Para-dressage team in 2013, after competing for Great Britain. At her first international competition competing for Canada, the 2014 World Equestrian Games, she placed fourth in the freestyle test aboard Bindro T. In 2015, she purchased Fairuza, a six-year old Gelderlander mare. She made her Paralympic debut in 2016, competing with her nine-year-old Donnersohn mare, Double Agent. She placed 14th in the Grade III individual event.

Sheffield was reclassified from grade IV to grade III in 2018 after an assessment determined that her level of impairment had increased. She was named to compete for Canada at the 2020 Summer Paralympics in the grade III classification. On the Canadian Para-equestrian team with Lauren Barwick and Noni Hartvikson, Sheffield placed tenth in the team test.

Sheffield was named to Canada's equestrian team for the 2022 integrated FEI World Equestrian Championships, her first competition after the Paralympics. She placed sixth riding Fairuza. At the 2022 CPEDI3* Keysoe International, Sheffield won the grade III team test and the grade III individual championship test and came second in the freestyle competition. At the CPEDI3* in Waregem, she and Fairuza placed second in the team test and fourth in the individual test. She placed second in the team, individual, and freestyle events at the CPEDI 3* event in Deauville that year.

She was named "owner of the year" for 2022 by the Canadian Equestrian Federation. At the CPEDI 3* Mannheim in 2023, she won first place in freestyle with a score of 74.489%. She also won the Para Grand Prix B and the came second in the Para Grand Prix A.

Sheffield competed with Fairuza at the 2024 Summer Paralympics. She placed sixth in the para equestrian individual freestyle grade II and in the individual dressage grade II. Sheffield, representing Canada with Jody Schloss riding El Colorado and Austen Burns with Happy Feet 3, finished 11th in the team event. She received the 2024 Equestrian Canada Para Dressage Award for Athlete of the Year; Fairuza also won for horse of the year.
