= Sara Morganti =

Italian Paralympic equestrian (born 1976)

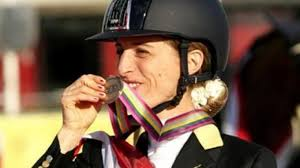
- Sara Morganti

Personal information
- Discipline: Para-dressage
- Born: 21 March 1976 (age 50); Castelnuovo di Garfagnana, Italy
- Horses: Royal Delight; Mariebelle
Medal record
Para-equestrian
Representing Italy
Event	1st	2nd	3rd
Paralympic Games	0	1	3
World Equestrian Games	4	2	0
European Championships	2	2	4
Total	6	5	7
Paralympic Games
Silver medal – second place	2024 Paris	Individual freestyle test grade I
Bronze medal – third place	2020 Tokyo	Individual championship test grade I
Bronze medal – third place	2020 Tokyo	Individual freestyle test grade I
Bronze medal – third place	2024 Paris	Individual championship test grade I

Sara Morganti (born 21 March 1976) is an Italian para-equestrian who won a silver and three bronze medals at the Paralympic Games, making her the first and only winner of a Paralympic medal in Equestrian for Italy.

== Early life ==
Sara Morganti was born on 21 March 1976 in Castelnuovo di Garfagnana, Tuscany, Italy. In 1995, when she was 19, she contracted multiple sclerosis. She studied foreign languages at the University of Pisa, graduating with 110 cum laude (the highest rank). In 1998, Morganti married Stefano Meoli, who is an equestrian too.

== Career ==
Morganti rode the horse Royal Delight from the 2012 London Paralympics. In 2014, she was Allianz Athlete of the Month. Starting in 2018, she has been president of the National Commission for Paralympic Athletes, of the Italian Paralympic Committee.

In 2021, she and Royal Delight competed at the 2020 Summer Paralympics, in Equestrian, winning on 27 August the first Paralympic Equestrian bronze medal for Italy in the Individual championship test, and on 30 August another bronze in the Individual freestyle test.

In 2024, Morganti and her mare Mariebelle participated in the Paris Paralympic Games. On 3 September they won a bronze medal in the individual championship test with a 74.625% score, and on 7 September they won the first Paralympic Equestrian silver for Italy in the individual freestyle test with an 81.407% score.

== See also ==
- Italy at the 2020 Summer Paralympics
- Italy at the 2024 Summer Paralympics
