= Mari Durward-Akhurst =

British para-equestrian (born 1994)

Personal information
- Born: 23 February 1994 (age 32)

Sport
- Country: Great Britain
- Sport: Para equestrian
- Disability class: Grade I
- Event: Dressage

Achievements and titles
- Paralympic finals: 2024
Medal record
Representing United Kingdom
Paralympic Games
Bronze medal – third place	2024 Paris	Individual freestyle test grade I

Mari Durward-Akhurst (born 23 February 1994) is a British equestrian, She won the bronze medal in the Individual freestyle test grade I at the 2024 Summer Paralympics.
