= Snaffle bit =

Type of horse equipment that goes in the horses mouth

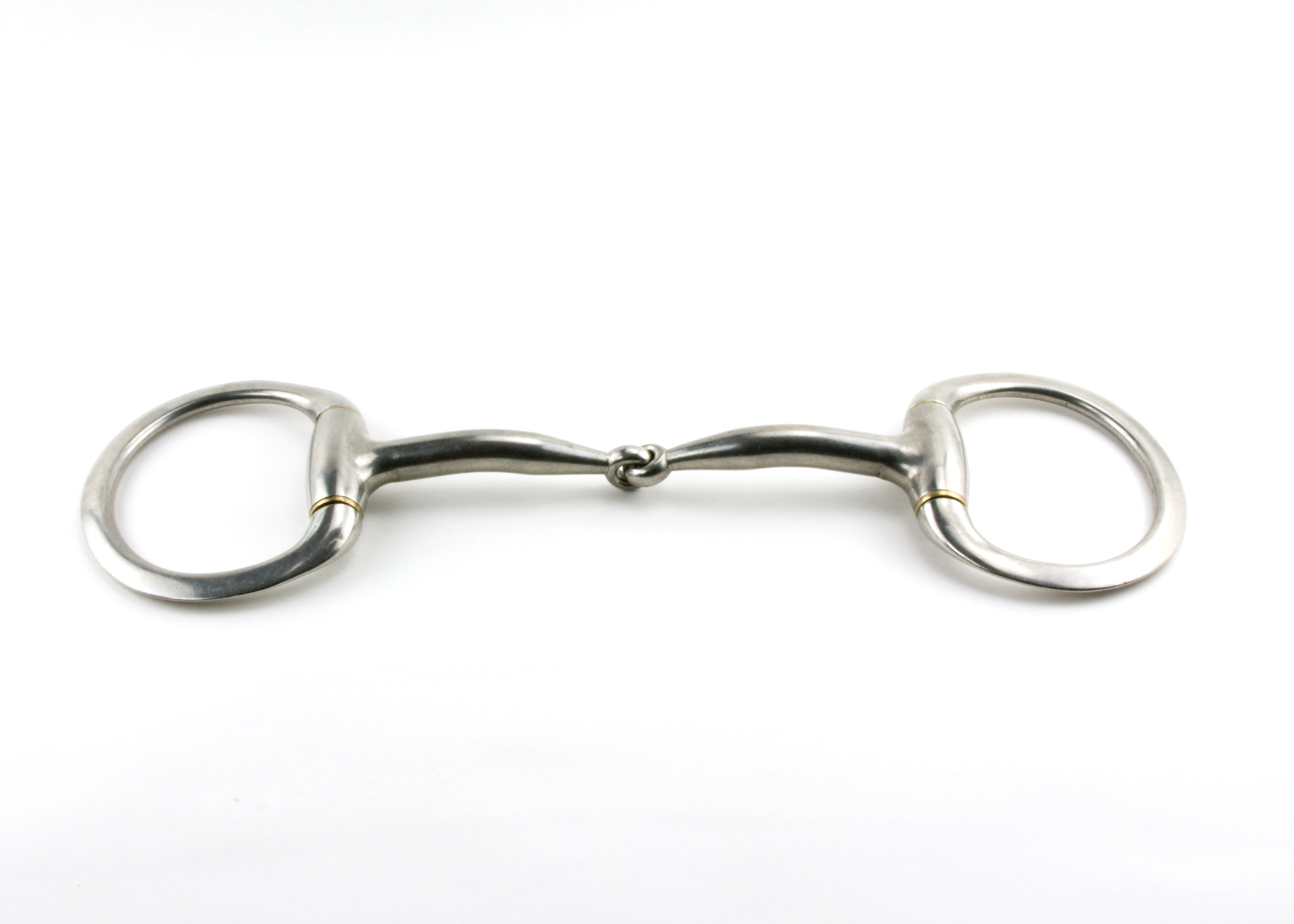
Snaffle bit

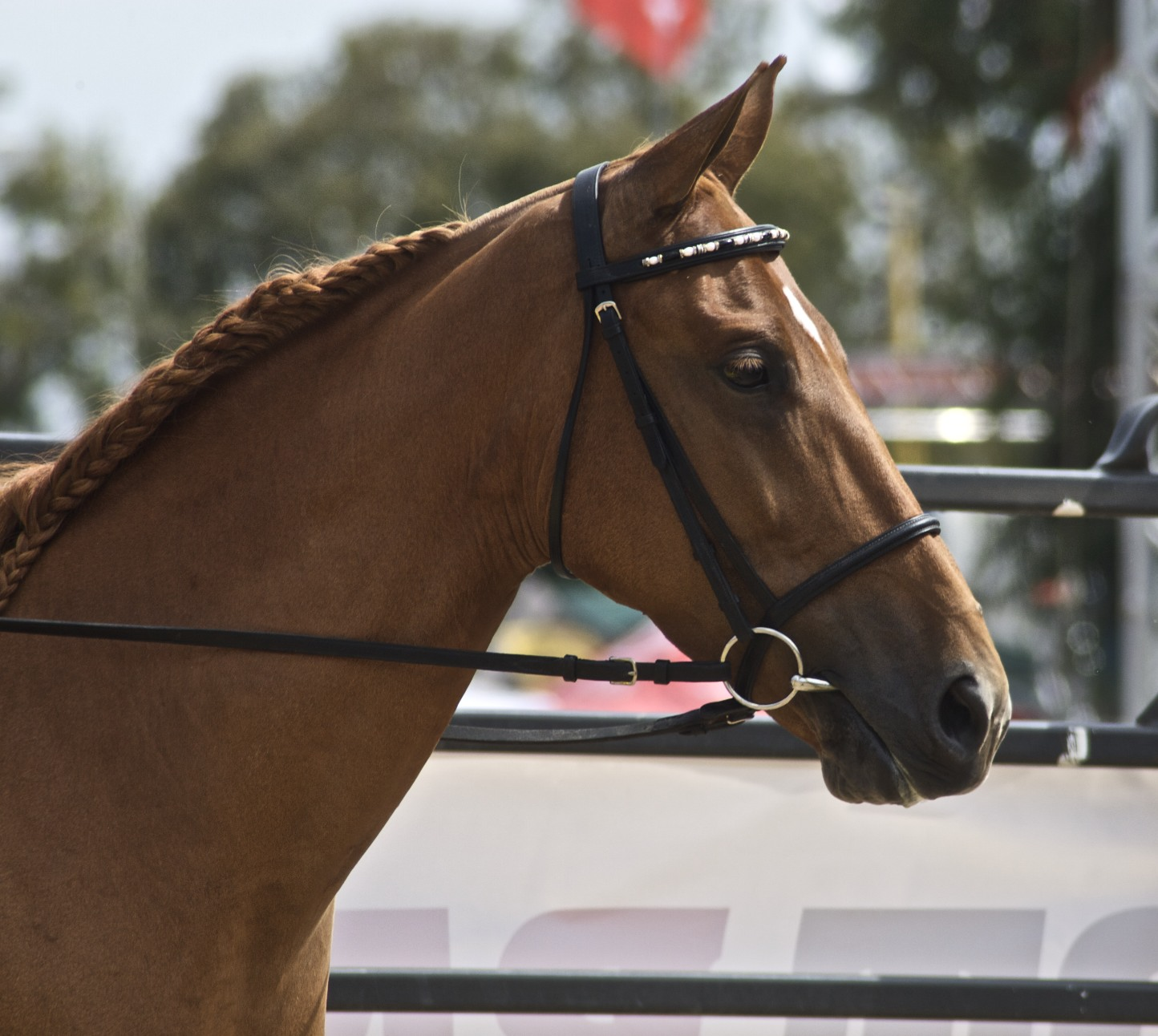
A horse wearing a snaffle bit

A snaffle bit is the most common type of bit used while riding horses. It consists of a mouthpiece and two rings. The mouthpieces may be jointed. A snaffle gives direct pressure on the horse's mouth and has no leveraging shank. A bridle utilizing only a snaffle bit is often called a "snaffle bridle", particularly in English riding. A double bridle carries two bits, a curb bit and a thin snaffle called a "bradoon".

== Action ==
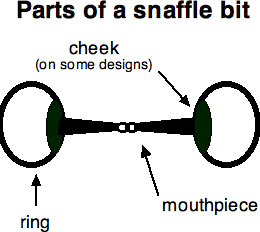

The snaffle bit works on several parts of the horse's mouth; the mouthpiece of the bit acts on the tongue and bars, the lips of the horse also feel pressure from both the mouthpiece and the rings. The rings also serve to act on the side of the mouth, and, depending on design, the sides of the jawbone.

A snaffle is sometimes mistakenly thought of as "any mild bit". While direct pressure without leverage is milder than pressure with leverage, nonetheless, certain types of snaffle bits can be extremely harsh when manufactured with wire, twisted metal or other "sharp" elements. A thin or rough-surfaced snaffle, used harshly, can damage a horse's mouth.

Curb chains or straps have no effect on a true snaffle because there is no leverage to act upon. English riders do not add any type of curb strap or curb chain to a snaffle bit. While some riders in western disciplines do add a curb strap to the rings, it is merely a "hobble" for the rings, has no leverage effect and is there only as a safety feature to prevent the rings from being pulled through the mouth of the horse, should the animal gape open its mouth in an attempt to avoid the bit, an outcome prevented in an English bridle by the presence of a cavesson noseband.

=== Difference from a curb ===
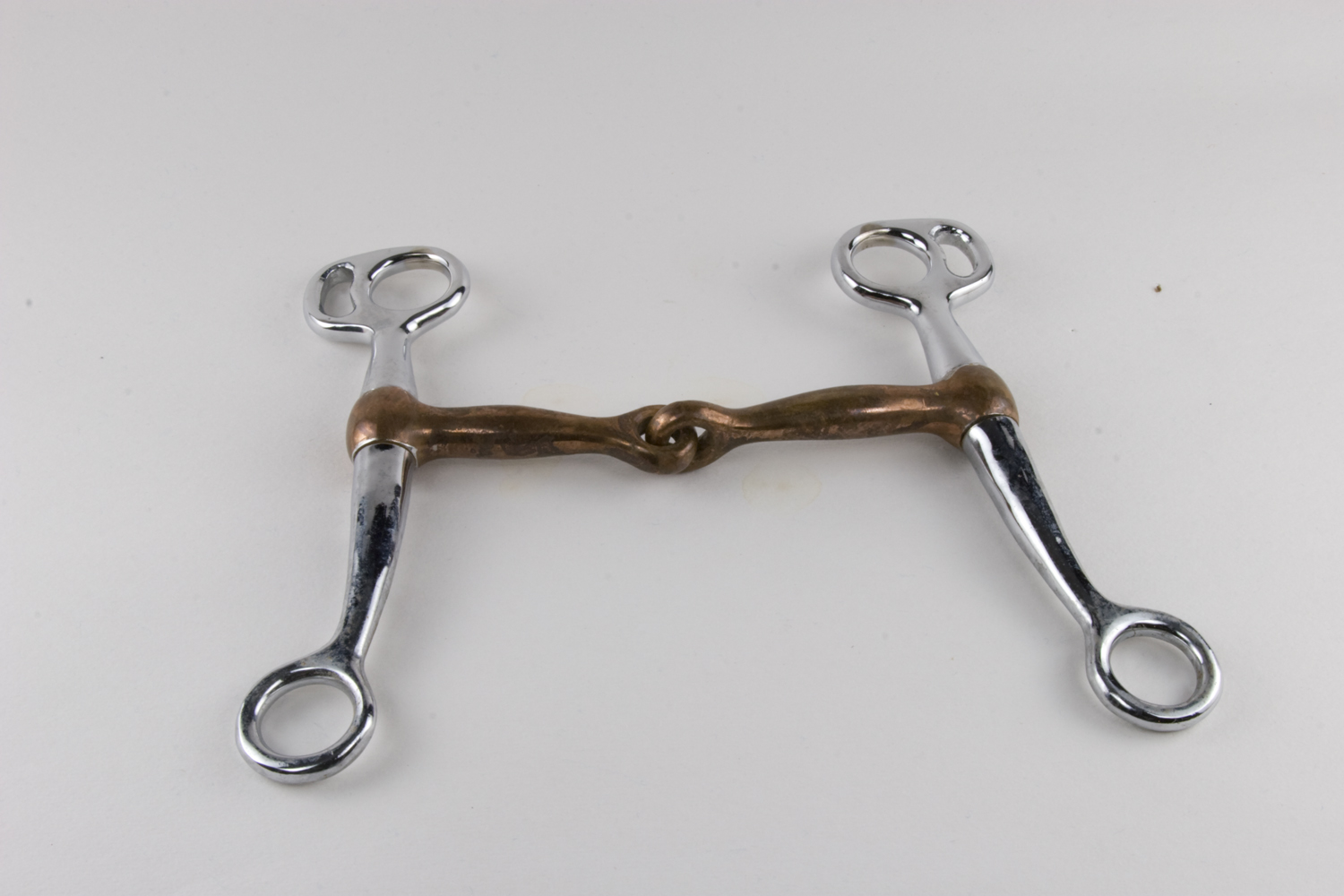
This is a curb bit with a jointed mouthpiece, sometimes called a "cowboy snaffle". However, such bits are not snaffle bits because they have a shank and work with leverage

The snaffle differs from the pelham bit, the curb bit, and the kimberwicke in that it is a non-leverage bit, and so does not amplify the pressure applied by the reins. With a snaffle, one ounce of pressure applied by the reins to a snaffle mouthpiece will apply one ounce of pressure on the mouth. With a curb, one ounce of pressure on the reins will apply more – sometimes far more – than one ounce of pressure on the horse's mouth.

There are many riders (and a remarkable number of tack shops) who do not know the true definition of a snaffle: a bit that is non-leverage. This often results in a rider purchasing a jointed mouthpiece bit with shanks, because it is labeled a "snaffle," and believing that it is soft and kind because of the connotation the snaffle name has with being mild. In truth, the rider actually bought a curb bit with a jointed mouthpiece, which actually is a fairly severe bit due to the combination of a nutcracker effect on the jaw and leverage from the shanks.

A true snaffle does not have a shank like a pelham or curb bit. Although the kimberwicke appears to have a D-shaped bit ring like a snaffle, the bit mouthpiece is not centered on the ring, and thus applying the reins creates leverage; in the Uxeter kimberwicke, there are slots for the reins placed within the bit ring, which allows the reins to create additional leverage. Both are used with a curb chain, thus the ring acts like a bit shank and creates a slight amount of leverage, making it a type of curb bit.

A true snaffle also will not be able to slide up and down the rings of the bit or cheekpieces of the bridle, as this would place it in the gag bit category.

== Mouthpiece ==
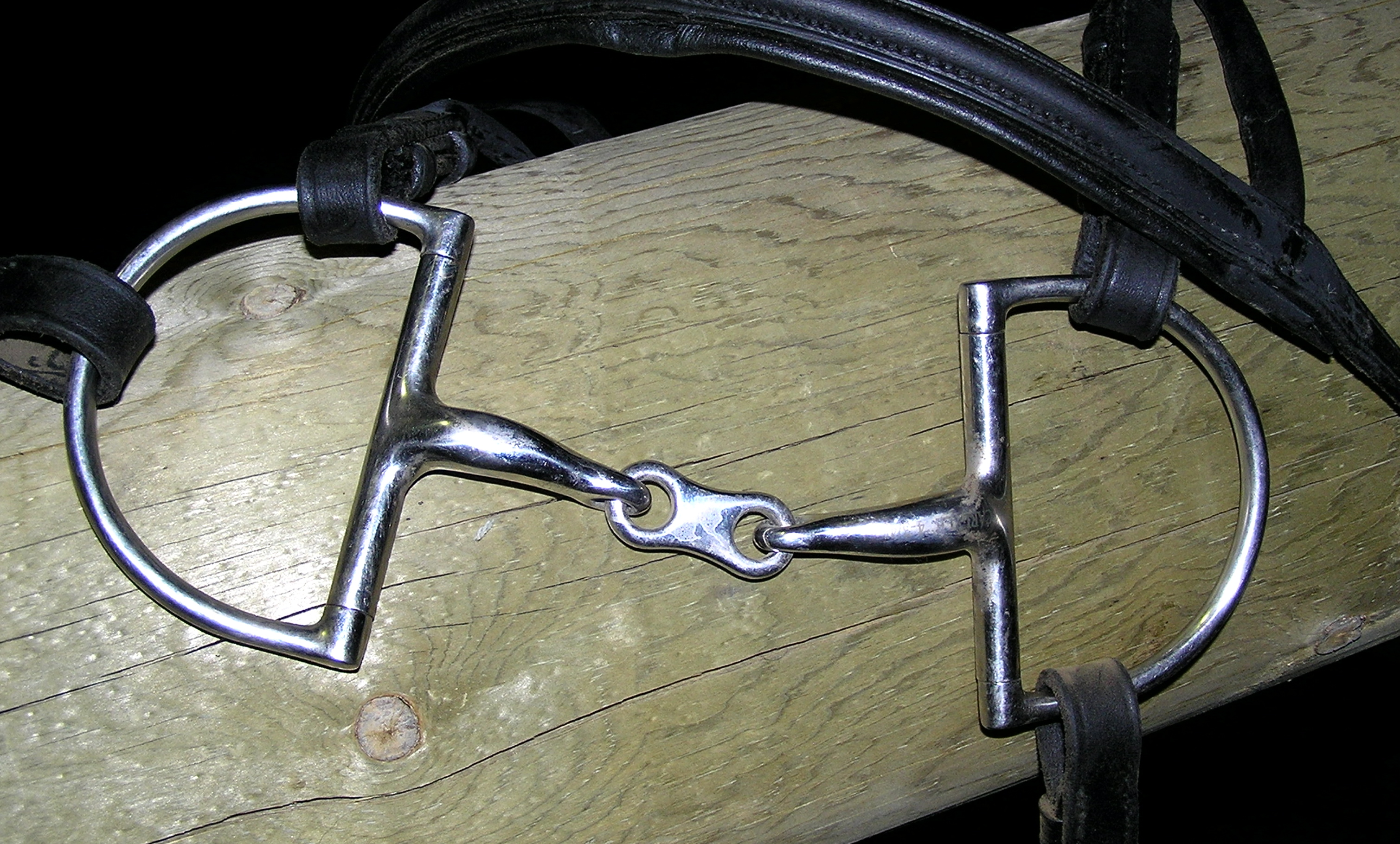
A French link mouthpiece

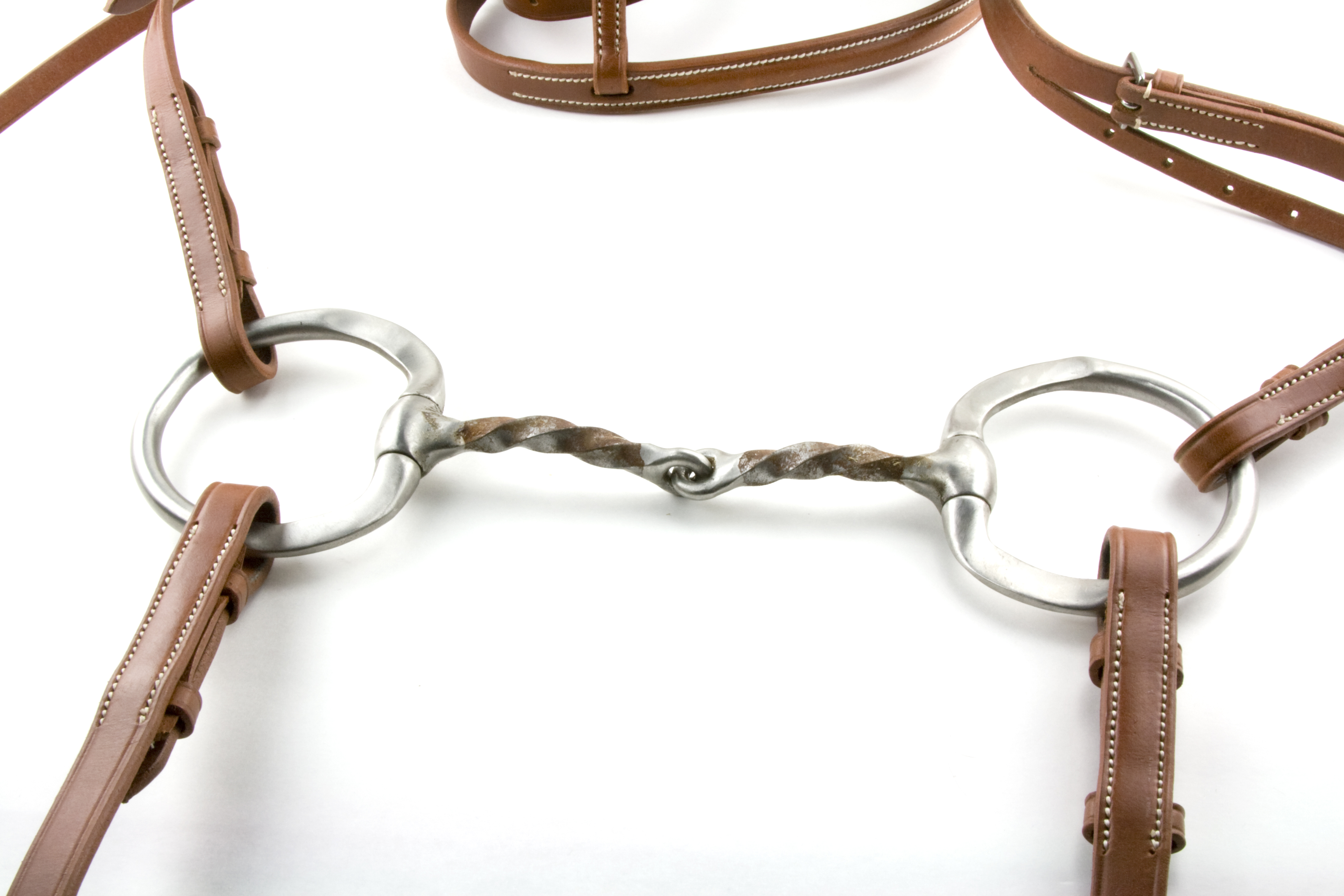
A twisted mouthpiece

The mouthpiece is the more important part of a snaffle, as it controls the severity of the bit. Thinner mouthpieces are more severe, as are those that are rough (not smooth).

- Jointed mouthpiece: applies pressure to the tongue, lips, and bars with a "nutcracker" action. This is the most common mouthpiece found on a snaffle.
- Straight mouthpiece: A straight bar with no curve. Several bit designs use a straight bar where the bit can be flipped over, thus using either the smooth bar side or a twisted bar. The Liverpool bit is an example of this.
- Mullen mouth: a slightly curved mouthpiece (non-jointed). It is a very mild mouthpiece.
- French mouth: a double-jointed mouthpiece with a small link in the middle. It reduces the nutcracker action and encourages the horse to relax. Very mild.
- Dr. Bristol: a double-jointed mouthpiece with a thin rectangular link in the middle that is set at an angle, creating a pressure point. It is a fairly severe bit.
- Slow twist: a single-jointed mouthpiece with a slight twist in it. Stronger and more severe.
- Corkscrew: Many small edges amplifies the pressure on the mouth. Severe.
- Single- and double-twisted wire: two of the most severe mouthpieces, as they are not only thin, but they also have a "nutcracker" action from the single joint and the mouthpiece concentrates pressure due to its severe twisting.
- Roller mouthpieces: tend to make horses relax their mouth and activate the tongue, encouraging salivation and acceptance of the bit. This may also help focus a tense or nervous horse to the bit.
- Hollow mouth: a thick single-jointed bit made of metal that is hollowed to lighten the weight from a thicker mouthpiece. Pressure spreads out to make the bit less severe. May be too thick for some horses.

== Snaffle rings ==
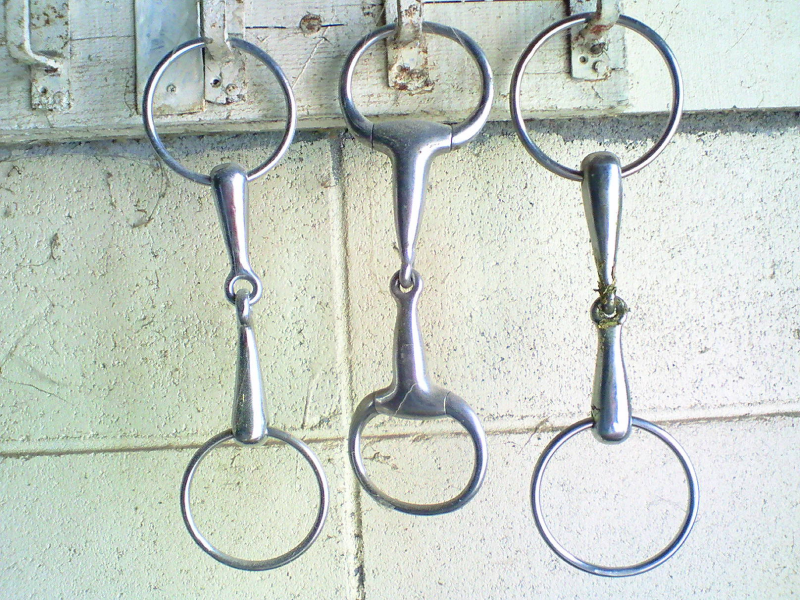
Loose rings (left and right), eggbutt (center)

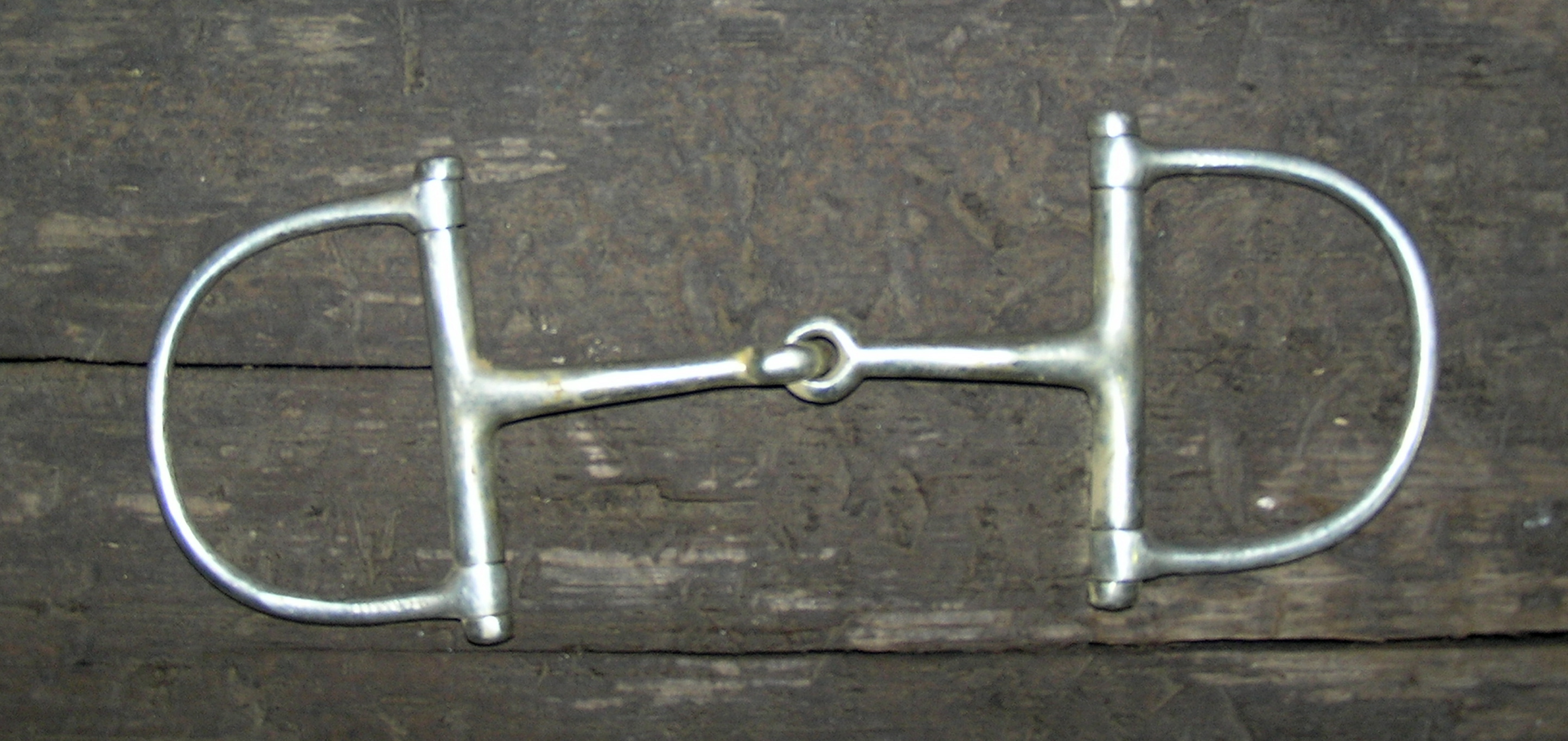
D Ring

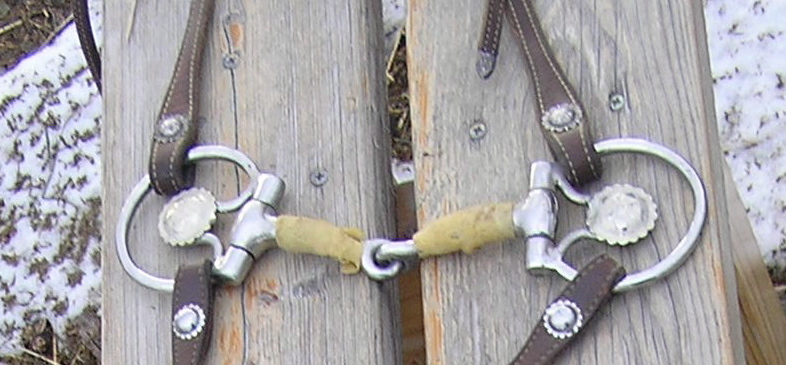
Western stylized rings

There are several types of rings that affect the action of the bit.

- Loose ring: slides through the mouthpiece. Tends to make the horse relax his jaw and chew the bit. May pinch the corners of the horse's mouth if the holes in the mouthpiece are large, in which case a bit guard should be used.
- Egg butt/barrel head: mouthpiece does not rotate, and is so more fixed in the horse's mouth, which some horses prefer. Will not pinch the lips.
- D-ring/ racing snaffle: ring in the shape of a "D" which does not allow the bit to rotate and so the bit is more fixed. The sides of the D provide a lateral guiding effect.
- Full cheek: has long, extended arms above and below the mouthpiece on either side of the lips of the horse, with a ring attached to it. The cheeks have a lateral guiding effect, and also prevent the bit from sliding through the mouth. The full cheek is often used with bit keepers to prevent the cheeks from getting caught on anything, and to keep the bit in the right position inside the mouth.
- Half-cheek: has only an upper or, more commonly, lower cheek, as opposed to both seen in a full cheek snaffle. Often used in racing, as there is less chance of the cheek being caught on the starting gate, or in driving as there is less chance of getting caught on harness straps.
- Baucher (hanging cheek): has a ring on the side of the mouthpiece, with a smaller ring above to attach the cheekpiece of the bridle. Tends to concentrate pressure on the bars. It is very fixed in the mouth.
- Fulmer: a full cheek bit with a loose ring attached, so that it not only has the lateral guiding effect, but can also move freely as with a loose ring.

== See also ==
- Bridle
- Horse tack
- National Snaffle Bit Association
