= Tobias Jørgensen =

Danish Paralympic equestrian

Personal information
- Full name: Tobias Thorning Jørgensen
- Born: 6 February 2000 (age 25)
Medal record
Equestrian
Representing Denmark
Paralympic Games
Gold medal – first place	2020 Tokyo	Individual Test - Grade III
Gold medal – first place	2020 Tokyo	Ind. Freestyle Test - Grade III

Tobias Thorning Jørgensen (born 6 February 2000) is a Danish Paralympic equestrian. In Equestrian at the 2020 Summer Paralympics he won gold in the Individual Test – Grade III event and the Individual Freestyle Test – Grade III event.
