= Katrine Kristensen =

Danish para-equestrian

Personal information
- Born: 23 January 1996 (age 30) Kalundborg, Denmark

Sport
- Country: Denmark
- Sport: Para equestrian
- Disability class: Grade II
- Event: Dressage

Achievements and titles
- Paralympic finals: 2024
- World finals: 2022
Medal record
Representing Denmark
Paralympic Games
| Silver medal – second place | 2024 Paris | Individual championship test grade II |
World Championships
| Gold medal – first place | 2022 Herning | Individual championship test grade II |
| Gold medal – first place | 2022 Herning | Individual freestyle test grade II |
| Silver medal – second place | 2022 Herning | Team event |

Katrine Kristensen (born 23 January 1996) is a Danish equestrian, who won silver in the Individual championship test grade II at the 2024 Summer Paralympics. She also won three medals at the 2022 FEI World Championships.
