= Roxanne Trunnell =

American Paralympic equestrian

Personal information
- National team: United States
- Born: April 26, 1985 (age 41) Richland, Washington, United States

Sport
- Sport: Para-equestrian
Medal record
Equestrian
Representing United States
Paralympic Games
Gold medal – first place	2020 Tokyo	Individual championship test grade I
Gold medal – first place	2020 Tokyo	Individual freestyle test grade I
Gold medal – first place	2024 Paris	Team
Silver medal – second place	2024 Paris	Individual championship test grade I
Bronze medal – third place	2020 Tokyo	Team open

Roxanne Trunnell (born April 26, 1985) is an American Paralympic equestrian. She won three medals at the 2020 Summer Paralympics including a gold medal at 2020 Summer Paralympics in the individual championship test grade I and individual freestyle test grade I events and a bronze medal in the team open event.

Trunnell was infected with the H1N1 virus which caused a stroke and confined her to a wheelchair.
