= Regine Mispelkamp =

Regine Mispelkamp (born in Heilbronn on 9 December 1970) is a German disabled equestrian. At the 2020 Summer Paralympics she won a bronze medal in the Individual Freestyle Test Grade V. On 11 August 2021, she was awarded the Silver Laurel Leaf, Germany's highest sports award, by the President of the Federal Republic of Germany.
