= Georgia Wilson (equestrian) =

British para-equestrian

Personal information
- Born: 2 October 1995 (age 30) Abergele, Wales

Sport
- Country: United Kingdom
- Sport: Para equestrian
- Disability class: Grade II
- Event: Dressage

Achievements and titles
- Paralympic finals: 2020
- Regional finals: 2019
Medal record
Representing Great Britain
Paralympic Games
Silver medal – second place	2024 Paris	Individual freestyle test grade II
Bronze medal – third place	2020 Tokyo	Individual championship test grade II
Bronze medal – third place	2020 Tokyo	Individual freestyle test grade II
Bronze medal – third place	2024 Paris	Individual championship test grade II
European Championships
Gold medal – first place	2019 Rotterdam	Individual championship test grade II
Silver medal – second place	2019 Rotterdam	Individual freestyle test grade II

Georgia Wilson (born 2 October 1995) is a British equestrian, who won bronze medals in the individual championship test grade II and individual freestyle test grade II events at the 2020 Summer Paralympics, and the Individual championship test grade II event at the 2024 Summer Paralympics. She also won the individual championship grade II event at the 2019 FEI European Championships.

== Early life ==
Wilson is from Abergele, Wales. She started riding aged two as her mother was advised it would help with her balance as she has cerebral palsy. She attended Rydal Penrhos in Colwyn Bay.

== Career ==
Wilson started training in Clwyd, Wales, and she is trained by fellow British dressage competitor Sophie Wells. She competed at the 2018 FEI World Equestrian Games. In January 2019, Wilson was one of six para-dressage competitors given National Lottery funding for the period from 2019 to 2021. That year, she competed 2019 FEI European Championships, her first European Championships, on the horse Midnight. At the Championships, Wilson won the individual freestyle grade II event, and also came second in the individual championship test grade II event and team events. In September 2020, Wilson started competing with horse Sakura, also known as Suki.

Wilson was not initially selected for the delayed 2020 Summer Paralympics; instead, she was the team's reserve. On 12 August 2021, she was called up to the British Paralympic equestrian team, replacing Sophie Christiansen whose horse was injured. It was her first Paralympic Games, and the first major championship event for Sakura. At the Games, Wilson won bronze medals in the individual championship test grade II and individual freestyle test grade II events. At one point in the individual championship event, Wilson was winning the event, and her individual championship medal was the first for a Welsh person at the Games. Her individual test score of 72.765 was only just behind Austria's Pepo Puch, who finished second in the event.

Wilson was selected for the 2024 Summer Paralympics, again with horse Sakura. She came third in the individual championship grade II event.
