= World Show Jumping Championships =

World Equestrian Games

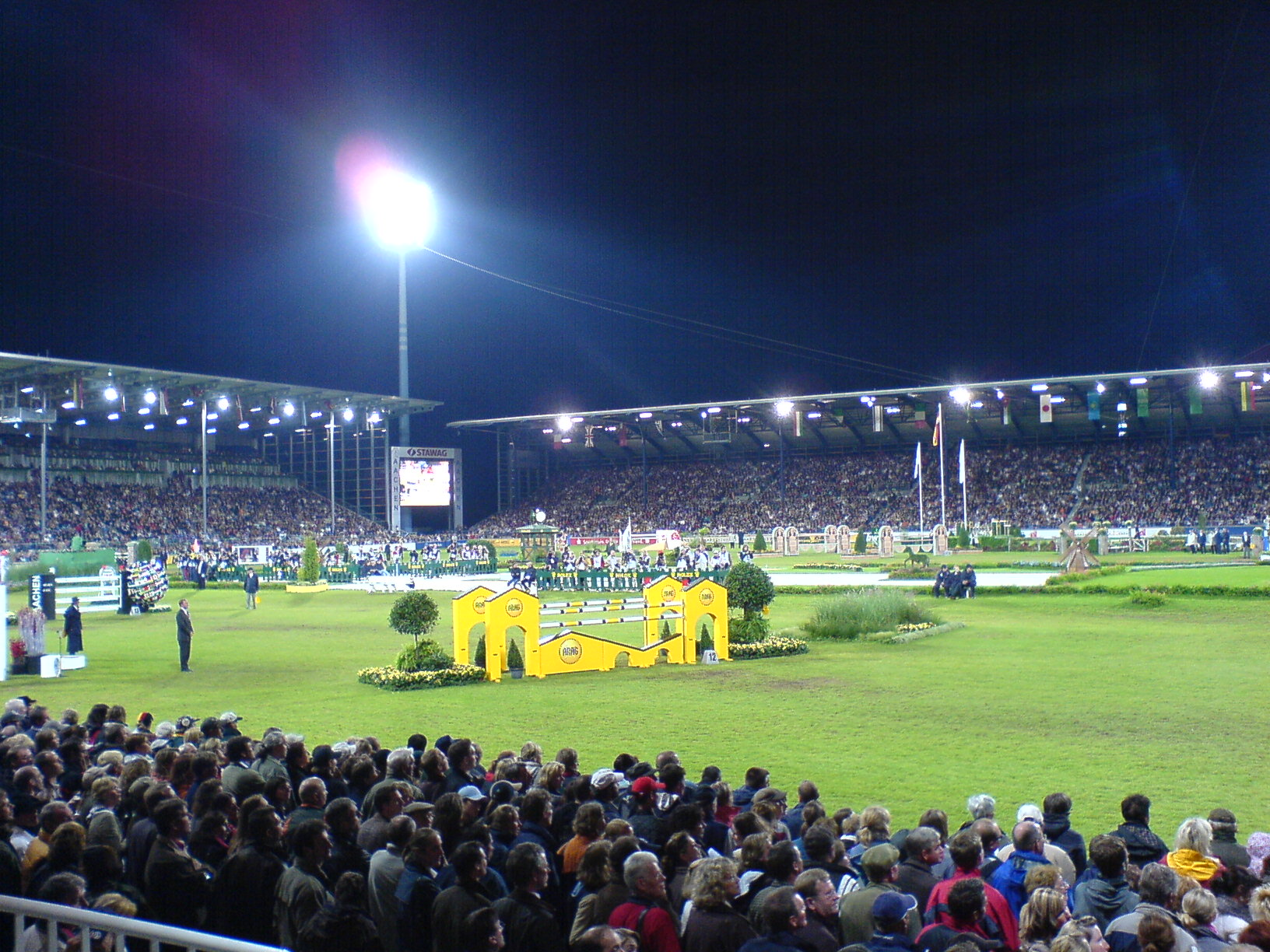
The Show Jumping competition at the 2006 WEG in Aachen

The World Show Jumping Championships, or the show jumping competition at the FEI World Equestrian Games, was started in 1953, with individual competition. In 1978 Team competitions began, and men and women began competing against one another. From 1990, show jumping was brought together along with the other equestrian disciplines into the World Equestrian Games (WEG). They are held every four years. The 2022 edition was held in Herning, Denmark.

== Past winners ==
=== Individual results ===
Individual medalists
Year		Gold	Silver	Bronze
1953	(France) Paris	(Spain) Francisco Goyoaga on Quorum	(West Germany) Fritz Thiedemann on Diamant	(France) Pierre Jonquères d'Oriola on Ali Baba
1954	(Spain) Madrid	(West Germany) Hans Günter Winkler on Halla	(France) Pierre Jonquères d'Oriola on Arlequin	(Spain) Francisco Goyoaga on Baden
1955	(West Germany) Aachen	(West Germany) Hans Günter Winkler on Orient	(Italy) Raimondo D'Inzeo on Merano	(United Kingdom) Ronnie Dallas on Bones
1956	(West Germany) Aachen	(Italy) Raimondo D'Inzeo on Merano	(Spain) Francisco Goyoaga on Fahnenkönig	(West Germany) Fritz Thiedemann on Meteor
1960	(Italy) Venice	(Italy) Raimondo D'Inzeo on Gowran Girl	(Argentina) Carlos César Delía on Huipil	(United Kingdom) David Broome on Sunsalve
1966	(Argentina) Buenos Aires	(France) Pierre Jonquères d'Oriola on Pomone B	(Spain) José Álvarez de Bohórquez on Quizas	(Italy) Raimondo D'Inzeo on Bowjak
1970	(France) La Baule	(United Kingdom) David Broome on Beethoven	(Italy) Graziano Mancinelli on Fidux	(United Kingdom) Harvey Smith on Mattie Brown
1974	(United Kingdom) Hickstead	(West Germany) Hartwig Steenken on Simona	(Republic of Ireland) Eddie Macken on Pele	(Austria) Hugo Simon on Lavendel
1978	(West Germany) Aachen	(West Germany) Gerd Wiltfang on Roman	(Republic of Ireland) Eddie Macken on Boomerang	(United States) Michael R. Matz on Jet Run
1982	(Republic of Ireland) Dublin	(West Germany) Norbert Koof on Fire	(United Kingdom) Malcolm Pyrah on Towerlands Anglezarke	(France) Michel Robert on Idéal de la Haye
1986	(West Germany) Aachen	(Canada) Gail Greenough on Mr T	(United States) Conrad Homfeld on Abdullah	(United Kingdom) Nick Skelton on Raffles Apollo
1990	(Sweden) Stockholm	(France) Eric Navet on Quito de Baussy	(United Kingdom) John Whitaker on Henderson Milton	(France) Hubert Bourdy on Morgat
1994	(Netherlands) The Hague	(Germany) Franke Sloothaak on San Patrignano Weihaiwej	(France) Michel Robert on Miss San Patrignano	(Germany) Sören von Rönne on Taggi
1998	(Italy) Rome	(Brazil) Rodrigo Pessoa on Gandini Lianos	(France) Thierry Pomel on Thor des Chaines	(Germany) Franke Sloothaak on San Patrignano Joy
2002	(Spain) Jerez	(Republic of Ireland) Dermott Lennon on Liscalgot	(France) Eric Navet on Dollar du Murier Hits de Seine	(United States) Peter Wylde on Fein Cera
2006	(Germany) Aachen	(Belgium) Jos Lansink on Cavalor Cumano	(United States) Beezie Madden on Authentic	(Germany) Meredith Michaels-Beerbaum on Shutterfly
2010	(United States) Lexington	(Belgium) Philippe Le Jeune on Vigo d´Arsouilles	(Saudi Arabia) Abdullah Al-Sharbatly on Seldana di Campalto	(Canada) Eric Lamaze on Hickstead
2014	(France) Normandy	(Netherlands) Jeroen Dubbeldam on Zenith SFN	(France) Patrice Delaveau on Orient Express HDC	(United States) Beezie Madden on Cortes 'C'
2018	(United States) Tryon	(Germany) Simone Blum on DSP Alice	(Switzerland) Martin Fuchs on Clooney	(Switzerland) Steve Guerdat on Bianca
2022	(Denmark) Herning	(Sweden) Henrik von Eckermann on King Edward	(Belgium) Jérôme Guery on Quel Homme de Hus	(Netherlands) Maikel van der Vleuten on Beauville Z

=== Team results ===
Team medalists
Year	Location	Gold	Silver	Bronze
1978	(West Germany) Aachen	Great Britain; Caroline Bradley on Tigre; David Broome on Philco; Derek Ricketts on Hydrophane Coldstream; Malcolm Pyrah on Law Court	Netherlands; Johan Heins on Pandur Z Henk Nooren on Pluco; Anton Ebben on Jumbo Design; Dick Wieken on Sil Z	United States; Michael R. Matz on Jet Run; Conrad Homfeld on Balbuco; Dennis Murphy on Tuscaloosa; Buddy Brown on Viscount
1982	(Republic of Ireland) Dublin	France; Michel Robert on Ideal de la Haye; Patrick Caron on Eole IV; Frédéric Cottier on Flambeau C Gilles Bertrán de Balanda on Galoubet A	West Germany; Norbert Koof on Fire; Gerd Wiltfang on Roman; Paul Schockemöhle on Deister; Peter Luther on Livius	Great Britain; Malcolm Pyrah on Anglezarke; John Whitaker on Ryans Son; David Broome on Mr Ross; Nick Skelton on If Ever
1986	(West Germany) Aachen	United States; Conrad Homfeld on Abdullah; Michael R. Matz on Chef; Katharine Burdsall on The Natural; Katie Monahan on Amadia	Great Britain; Nick Skelton on Raffles Apollo; Michael Whitaker on Next Warren Point; John Whitaker on Hopscotch; Malcolm Pyrah on Anglezarke	France; Michel Robert on La Fayette; Patrice Delaveau on Laeken; Frédéric Cottier on Flambeau C Pierre Durand Jr. on Jappeloup
1990	(Sweden) Stockholm	France; Eric Navet on Quito de Baussy; Hubert Bourdy on Morgat; Roger-Yves Bost on Norton de Rhuys; Pierre Durand Jr. on Jappeloup	Germany; Karsten Huck on Nepomuk; René Tebbel on Borsu Urchin; Otto Becker on Optiebeurs Pamina; Ludger Beerbaum on Almox Gazelle	Great Britain; Nick Skelton on Alan Paul Grand Slam; Michael Whitaker on Henderson Mon Santa; David Broome on Lennegan; John Whitaker on Henderson Milton
1994	(Netherlands) The Hague	Germany; Franke Sloothaak on San Patrignano Weihaiwej; Sören von Rönne on Taggi; Dirk Hafemeister on P.S. Priamos; Ludger Beerbaum on Almox Ratina	France; Roger-Yves Bost on Souviens Toi III Equus; Philippe Rozier on Baiko Rocco; Eric Navet on Quito de Baussy; Michel Robert on Miss San Patrignano	Switzerland; Thomas Fuchs on Major AC Folien; Stefan Lauber on Lugana II; Marcus Fuchs on Interpane Goldfights; Lesley McNaught-Mändli on Piroi
1998	(Italy) Rome	Germany; Lars Nieberg on Loro Piana Esprit; Markus Beerbaum on Lady Weingard; Franke Sloothaak on San Patrignano Jolly; Ludger Beerbaum on P.S. Priamos	France; Alexandra Ledermann on Rochet; Roger-Yves Bost on Airborne Montecillo; Eric Navet on Atout d'Isigny; Thierry Pomel on Thor des Chaines	Great Britain; Diane Lampard on Abbervail Dream; Geoff Billington on It's Otto; Nick Skelton on Hopes are H. John Whitaker on Heyman
2002	(Spain) Jerez	France; Eric Levallois on Diamont de Semilly Ecolit; Reynald Angot on Tlaloc; Gilles Bertrán de Balanda on Crocus Graverie; Eric Navet on Dollar du Murier Hits de Seine	Sweden; Peter Eriksson on VDL Cardento; Royne Zetterman on Richmont Park; Helena Lundbäck on Utfors Mynta; Malin Baryard on H&M Butterfly Flip	Belgium; Philippe Le Jeune on Nabab de Reve; Stanny van Paesschen on O da Pomme; Peter Postelmans on Oleander; Jos Lansink on AK Caridor Z
2006	(Germany) Aachen	Netherlands; Gerco Schröder on Eurocommerce; Albert Zoer on Okidoki; Jeroen Dubbeldam on BMC Up and Down; Piet Raijmakers on Van Schijndel's	United States; Beezie Madden on Authentic; McLain Ward on Sapphire; Laura Kraut on Miss Independent; Margie Goldstein-Engle on Quervo Gold	Germany; Ludger Beerbaum on L'Espoir; Marcus Ehning on Noltes Kuchengirl; Meredith Michaels-Beerbaum on Shutterfly; Christian Ahlmann on Cöster
2010	(United States) Lexington	Germany; Marcus Ehning on Plot Blue; Janne Friederike Meyer on Cellagon Lambrasco; Meredith Michaels-Beerbaum on Checkmate; Carsten-Otto Nagel on Corradina	France; Patrice Delaveau on Katchina Mail; Olivier Guillon on Lord of Theizé; Pénélope Leprevost on Mylord Carthago; Kevin Staut on Silvana de Hus	Belgium; Dirk Demeersman on Bufero VH Panishof; Jos Lansink on Cavalor Valentina van't Heike; Philippe Le Jeune on Vigo d'Arsouilles; Judy-Ann Melchior on Cha Cha Z
2014	(France) Normandy	Netherlands; Jeroen Dubbeldam on Zenith SFN; Maikel van der Vleuten on VDL Groep Verdi; Jur Vrieling on VDL Bubalu; Gerco Schröder on Glock's London	France; Simon Delestre on Qlassic Bois Margot; Pénélope Leprevost on Flora de Mariposa; Kevin Staut on Reveur de Hurtebise HDC; Patrice Delaveau on Orient Express HDC	United States; McLain Ward on Rothchild; Kent Farrington on Voyeur; Lucy Davis on Barron; Beezie Madden on Cortes 'C'
2018	(United States) Tryon	United States; Devin Ryan on Eddie Blue; Adrienne Sternlicht on Cristalline; Laura Kraut on Zeremonie; McLain Ward on Clinta	Sweden; Henrik von Eckermann on Toveks Mary Lou; Malin Baryard-Johnsson on H&M Indiana; Fredrik Jönsson on Cold Play; Peder Fredricson on H&M Christian K	Germany; Simone Blum on DSP Alice; Laura Klaphake on Catch Me If You Can OLD; Maurice Tebbel on Don Diarado; Marcus Ehning on Pret A Tout
2022	(Denmark) Herning	Sweden; Henrik von Eckermann on King Edward; Malin Baryard-Johnsson on H&M Indiana; Jens Fredricson on Markan Cosmopolit; Peder Fredricson on H&M All In	Netherlands; Sanne Thijssen on Con Quidam RB; Maikel van der Vleuten on Beauville Z Jur Vrieling on Long John Silver; Harrie Smolders on Monaco	Great Britain; Ben Maher on Faltic HB; Joseph Stockdale on Equine America Cacherel; Harry Charles on Romeo 88; Scott Brash on Hello Jefferson

=== Women's results ===
Individual medalists
Year	Location	Gold	Silver	Bronze
1965	(United Kingdom) Hickstead	(United Kingdom) Marion Coakes on Stroller	(United States) Kathy Kusner on Untouchable	(United Kingdom) Alison Westwood on The Maverick
1970	(Denmark) Copenhagen	(France) Janou Lefèbvre on Rocket	(United Kingdom) Marion Mould-Coakes on Stroller	(United Kingdom) Annelie Drummond-Hay on Merely A Monarch
1974	(France) La Baule	(France) Janou Tissot-Lefèbvre on Rocket	(United States) Michele McEvoy on Mr Muskie	(Canada) Barbara Simpson-Kerr on Magnor

== Medal count ==
Rank	Nation	Gold	Silver	Bronze	Total
1	Germany	10	3	6	19
2	France	7	9	4	20
3	Great Britain	3	4	10	17
4	Netherlands	3	2	1	6
5	United States	2	5	5	12
6	Italy	2	2	1	5
7	Sweden	2	2	0	4
8	Belgium	2	1	2	5
9	Spain	1	2	1	4
10	Ireland	1	2	0	3
11	Canada	1	0	2	3
12	Brazil	1	0	0	1
13	Switzerland	0	1	2	3
14	Argentina	0	1	0	1
14	Saudi Arabia	0	1	0	1
16	Austria	0	0	1	1
Totals (16 entries)		35	35	35	105

- Note 1: Medal count is sorted by total gold medals, then total silver medals, then total bronze medals, then alphabetically.
- Note 2: Germany includes both Germany and West Germany.
