= Pamela Anne Gordon =

Canadian model (1943–2023)

Pamela Gordon

Playboy centerfold appearance
- March 1962
- Preceded by: Kari Knudsen
- Succeeded by: Roberta Lane

Personal details
- Born: 10 February 1943; British Columbia, Canada
- Died: January 25, 2023 (aged 79); Abbotsford, British Columbia, Canada
- Height: 5 ft 1 in (1.55 m)

Pamela Anne Gordon (10 February 1943 – 25 January 2023) was a Canadian model. She was Playboy magazine's first Canadian Playmate, featured in its March 1962 issue. Her centerfold was photographed by Mario Casilli and Ken Honey.

Gordon was born in British Columbia on 10 February 1943. She went on to work as a Bunny at the Chicago Playboy Club. She also was named one of the top Canadians of 1962 by Liberty magazine.

She died in Abbotsford shortly before her 80th birthday.

== See also ==
- List of people in Playboy 1960–1969

Merle Pertile	Kari Knudsen	Pamela Gordon	Roberta Lane	Marya Carter	Merissa Mathes
Unne Terjesen	Jan Roberts	Mickey Winters	Laura Young	Avis Kimble	June Cochran
