= Galoubet =

Galoubet may refer to:

- Galoubet A (1972–2005), a show jumping horse
- Galoubet, a type of pipe instrument
