= Fonck (surname) =

Fonck is a German surname derived from the nickname meaning "spark", possibly indicating at the occupation of blacksmith. Notable people with this surname are:

- Antoine Fonck
- Bernard Fonck (born 1973), Belgian equestrian
- Catherine Fonck (born 1968), Belgian nephrologist and politician
- Cecilia Bolocco Fonck (born 1965), Chilean actress, TV host, and Miss Universe 1987
- Johny Fonck (1920–2008), Luxembourgish athlete
- René Fonck (1894–1953), French World War I flying ace
- René Fonck (canoeist) (1923–2018), Luxembourgish sprint canoer
