= Sternlicht =

Sternlicht is a surname. Notable people with the surname include:

- Adrienne Sternlicht (born 1993), American show jumping rider
- Barry Sternlicht (born 1960), American billionaire businessman
