= Simone Blum =

German equestrian

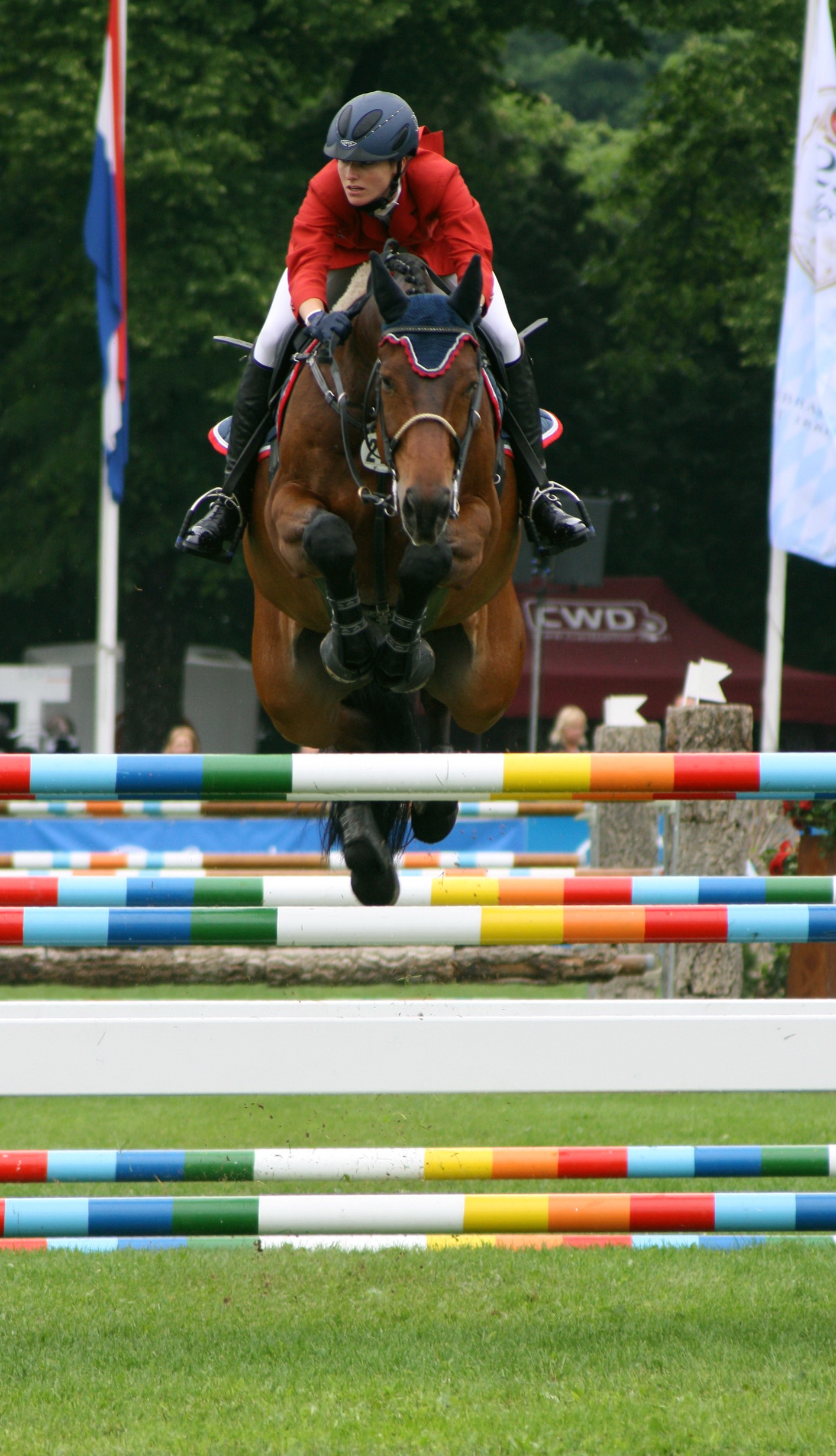
- Blum on Flying Boy at the Pferd International horse show 2011

Personal information
- Born: 22 March 1989 (age 37) Freising, Germany

Sport
- Sport: Horse riding
- Event: Show jumping
Medal record
Representing Germany
World Championships
Gold medal – first place	2018 Tryon	Individual jumping
Bronze medal – third place	2018 Tryon	Team jumping
European Championships
Silver medal – second place	2019 Rotterdam	Team jumping

Simone Blum (born 22 March 1989 in Freising) is a German show jumper. In 2018, she won the individual gold medal at the 2018 World Equestrian Games on her horse DSP Alice.

== Showjumping ==
Simone Blum started as an eventing rider, but quickly decided to specialise in show jumping. At 15, she finished fourth at the European Pony Championships. In 2015, she won silver, 2016 gold at the German Women's Championships. In 2017 she entered the open classification and immediately became German champion with the mare DSP Alice. Then she was called to the A-squad.

In July 2018 Blum and Alice were part of the victorious German team in the Nations Cup of Aachen. After which, she was called up for the 2018 World Equestrian Games in Tryon, North Carolina, where she won individual gold and team bronze. She was a surprise winner despite being the only rider to have a clear round in all 5 stages of the competition. She was the first German rider to ever win an individual gold medal at the World Equestrian Games within the showjumping competition.

== International Championship Results ==
Results
Year	Event	Horse	Placing	Notes
2018	World Equestrian Games	DSP Alice	3rd place, bronze medalist(s)	Team
2018	World Equestrian Games	DSP Alice	1st place, gold medalist(s)	Individual
2019	European Championships	DSP Alice	2nd place, silver medalist(s)	Team
2019	European Championships	DSP Alice	4th	Individual
EL = Eliminated; RET = Retired; WD = Withdrew

== Personal life ==
Blum lives in Zolling near Munich. She is the daughter of the Olympic eventing rider Jürgen Blum.

She has a Master's degree in chemistry and biology from the Technical University of Munich In October 2018, Simone Blum married her partner, the show jumper Hans-Günter Blum (born Goskowitz).

== Horses ==
- DSP Alice (2007 Chestnut German Sport Horse Mare)
