= Marion Coakes =

English equestrian

Medal record

Equestrian

Olympic Games
Silver medal – second place	1968 Mexico City	Individual jumping

Women's World Championships
Gold medal – first place	1965 Hickstead	Individual Jumping
Silver medal – second place	1970 Copenhagen	Individual Jumping

Marion Janice Mould (née Coakes; born 6 June 1947) is an English show-jumper. She competed for Great Britain at the 1968 Summer Olympics, winning a silver medal in the individual jumping event.

== Early life ==
Coakes was born in June 1947. Her father, Ralph, was a farmer in Hampshire. Her elder brothers, John and Douglas, were also on the British junior show jumping team. At the age of three she learned to ride on a donkey. In 1960, her father bought Stroller, an eight-year-old pony, originally imported in a job-lot from Ireland. At the end of Marion's junior career, when she was 16, her father wanted to replace Stroller with a larger horse, but Marion was not willing to let him go and continued show jumping on the pony.

== Career ==
In her second season as a senior Marion won the Queen Elizabeth II Cup—a former international ladies class event—that took place at the Royal International Horse Show. That year, she won three Nations Cup events, helping to win the Presidents Cup.

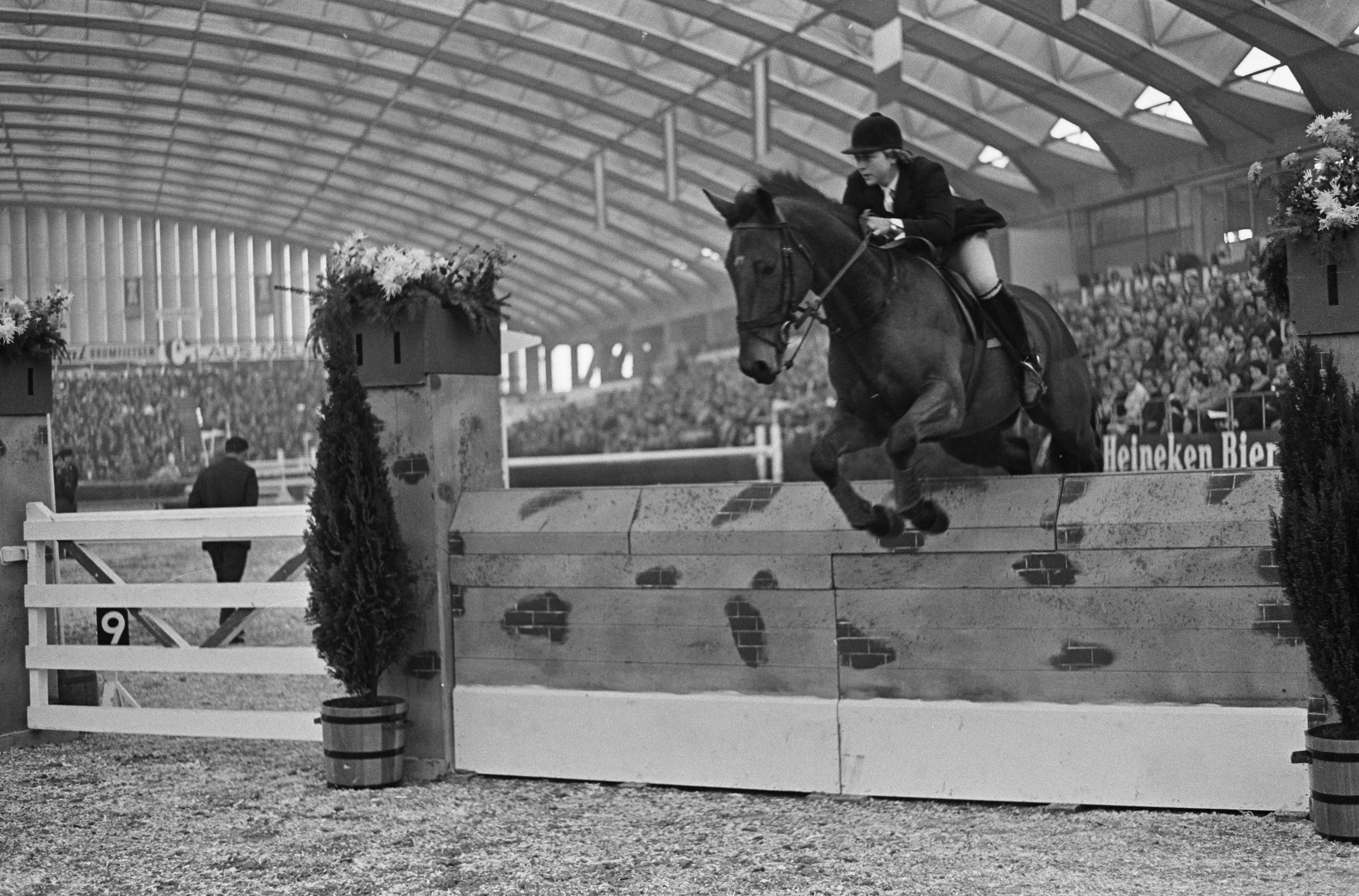
Coakes on her horse Little Yellow

In 1964 Marion won the Hickstead Derby Trial and placed second to Seamus Hayes in the Hickstead Derby, and the following year Marion rode Stroller to a gold medal in the ladies World Championship at Hickstead. She won the 1967 Hickstead Derby, placed second in 1968 and third in 1970. Marion competed at the 1968 Summer Olympics in both the team and the individual jumping events. In the individual jumping she won a silver medal. In 1970, Coakes won the Hamburg Derby with a clear round–the fiftieth recorded on the course and the first time by a female rider. That year Stroller was the leading show jumper Horse of the Year Show. Following Stroller's retirement, Marion continued to jump and won the Queen Elizabeth II Cup again in 1976 while riding on a new mount, Elizabeth Ann.

== Personal life ==
In 2006, Marion Coakes was inducted into The British Horse Society Equestrian Hall of Fame. She married the jockey David Mould in 1969, and they have a son named Jack.

== Media appearances ==
Coakes played a part in season 4, episode 3 of Monty Python's Flying Circus.
