= Abdullah (horse) =

Medal record

Olympics
Gold medal – first place	1984 Los Angeles	Team Jumping
Silver medal – second place	1984 Los Angeles	Individual Jumping

World Championships
Gold medal – first place	1986 Aachen	Team Jumping
Silver medal – second place	1986 Aachen	Individual Jumping

FEI World Cup
Gold medal – first place	1985 Berlin	Individual Jumping

Abdullah (December 7, 1970 – January 5, 2000) was a Trakehner stallion ridden by Conrad Homfeld. He won many international titles in the sport of show jumping, and is considered by some to be the best Trakehner ever to compete in the show-jumping ring. Abdullah was inducted into the United States Show Jumping Hall of Fame in 2009.

== Life ==
Abdullah was purchased by Williamsburg Farm in 1973 as a three-year-old from Gerhard Schickedanz in Unionville, Ontario, Canada. He was originally bought as an event prospect and breeding stallion, and proved himself first in the dressage arena and then in eventing before becoming a world-class show jumper. He was ridden by Debbie Shaffner, Joe Fargis and Conrad Homfeld.

=== Breeding career ===
Abdullah was approved for breeding by the United States, Canada, Selle Français, Sella Italiano, Anglo European Studbook, Irish Sport Horse, Hanoverian, Trakehner, Belgium Warmblood, Belgium Sporthorse, and Oldenburg studbooks. His progeny were extremely successful, including seven United States Equestrian Federation Horses of the Year in both the Hunter and Jumper disciplines. He ranks third place in money won by offspring in the International Jumper Futurity and International Hunter Futurity. He is the sire of showjumpers competing internationally in the Olympics, World Championships and World Cup Finals. Due to frozen semen, it is still possible to breed to the legendary stallion.

=== Eventing career ===
During his eventing career, Abdullah was awarded the American Trakehner Association (ATA) Trakehner Förderverein Award in 1976 and '77. This award is given annually to the ATA-registered purebred Trakehner who is the most successful in combined training.

=== Show-jumping Career ===
Abdullah had an extensive international level career for fourteen years between 1979 and 1989. He won the American Trakehner Association (ATA) Open Jumper Championships for 8 consecutive years between 1979 and 1986, as well as in 1988 and 1989. He was also awarded the ATA Palmenblüte Award in 1980, '82, '84, '85, and '86. The Palmenblüte trophy is awarded to the "ATA purebred Trakehner who has contributed the most in competition to promote the breed in North America." After Abdullah won the trophy for the fifth time, the first trophy was retired, with an acknowledgement of Abdullah's tremendous contributions to the Trakehner breed throughout the world, and a new trophy was put into place.

He helped the United States to the team gold, and took an individual silver at the 1984 Summer Olympics in Los Angeles. He won the 1985 World Cup Final in Berlin. Abdullah also helped the United States to the team gold, taking individual silver, at the 1986 Show Jumping World Championships in Aachen, Germany. Abdullah also won or placed at numerous other international level Grand Prix events.

=== Retirement ===
The stallion died January 5, 2000, due to colic. The Chronicle of the Horse recently honored Abdullah as one of the top 50 horses of the century.

== Pedigree ==
Pedigree of Abdullah
Sire Donauwind Trakehner 1965	Pregel; Trakehner; 1958	Tropenwald; Trakehner; 1941	Termit – 1933
Sire Donauwind Trakehner 1965	Pregel; Trakehner; 1958	Tropenwald; Trakehner; 1941	Tropenglut – 1932
Sire Donauwind Trakehner 1965	Pregel; Trakehner; 1958	Peraea; Trakehner; 1943	Hirtensang – 1929
Sire Donauwind Trakehner 1965	Pregel; Trakehner; 1958	Peraea; Trakehner; 1943	Per Adresse – 1939
Sire Donauwind Trakehner 1965	Donaulied; Trakehner; 1960	Boris; Trakehner; 1956	Gabriel – 1950
Sire Donauwind Trakehner 1965	Donaulied; Trakehner; 1960	Boris; Trakehner; 1956	Bea – 1940
Sire Donauwind Trakehner 1965	Donaulied; Trakehner; 1960	Donau; Trakehner; 1951	Hansakapitaen – 1941
Sire Donauwind Trakehner 1965	Donaulied; Trakehner; 1960	Donau; Trakehner; 1951	Donna – 1939
Dam Abiza Trakehner 1963	Maharadscha; Trakehner; 1957	Famulus; Trakehner; 1938	Fetysz – 1924
Dam Abiza Trakehner 1963	Maharadscha; Trakehner; 1957	Famulus; Trakehner; 1938	Faschingsnacht – 1931
Dam Abiza Trakehner 1963	Maharadscha; Trakehner; 1957	Marke; Trakehner; 1941	Marktvogt – 1936
Dam Abiza Trakehner 1963	Maharadscha; Trakehner; 1957	Marke; Trakehner; 1941	J Feldrose – 1934
Dam Abiza Trakehner 1963	Abendrot; Trakehner; 1949	Absalon; Trakehner; 1937	Poseidon – 1925
Dam Abiza Trakehner 1963	Abendrot; Trakehner; 1949	Absalon; Trakehner; 1937	Abfahrt – 1923
Dam Abiza Trakehner 1963	Abendrot; Trakehner; 1949	Arbeitgeberin; East Prussian; 1938	Alaskafuchs – 1923
Dam Abiza Trakehner 1963	Abendrot; Trakehner; 1949	Arbeitgeberin; East Prussian; 1938	Arbeit – 1924
