= Waterstock =

Village in Oxfordshire, England

Coordinates: 51.755°N 1.072°W

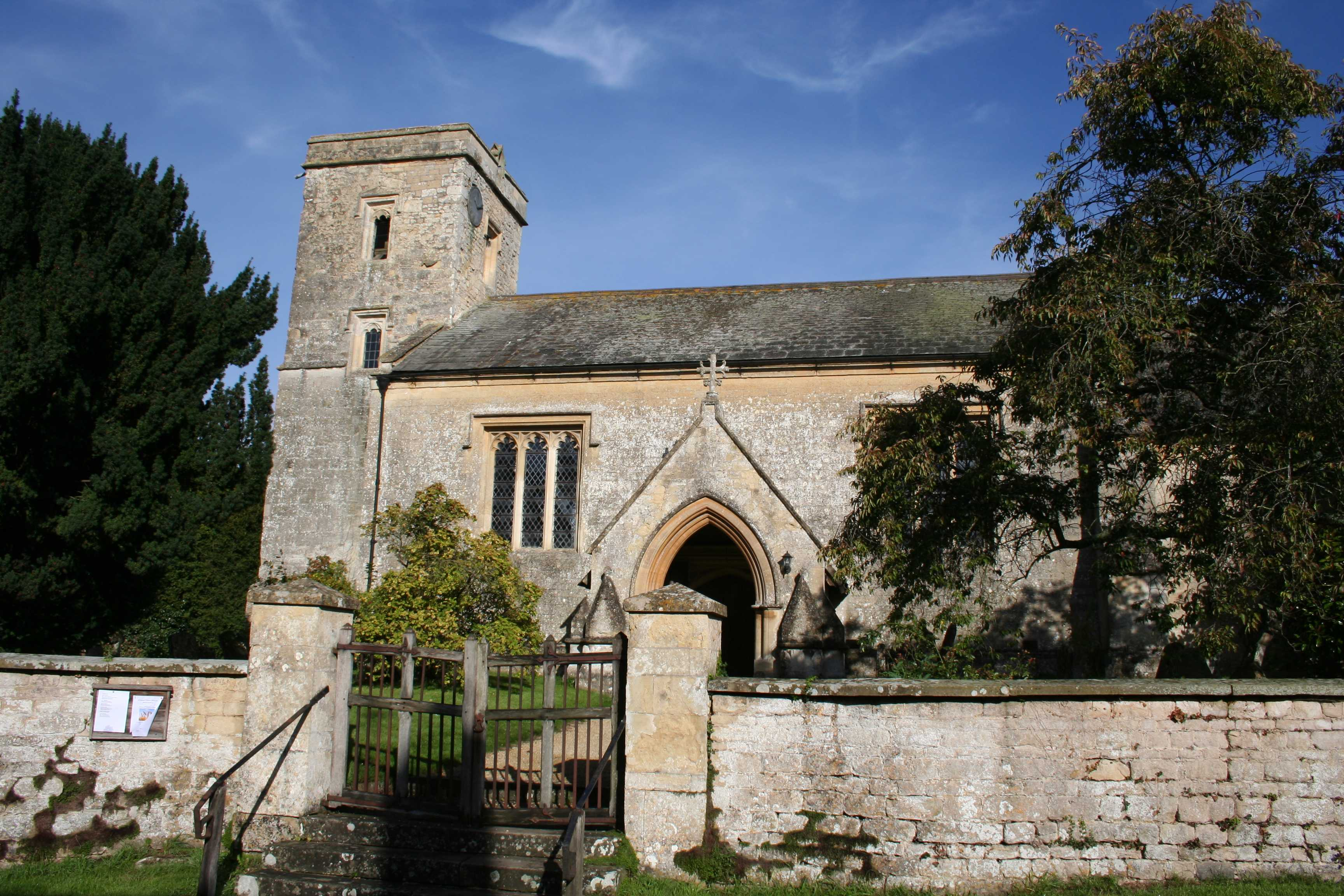
- St. Leonard's parish church

- Location within Oxfordshire
- Population: 65 (2001 census)
- OS grid reference: SP6305
- Civil parish: Waterstock
- District: South Oxfordshire
- Shire county: Oxfordshire
- Region: South East
- Country: England
- Sovereign state: United Kingdom
- Post town: Oxford
- Postcode district: OX33
- Dialling code: 01865
- Police: Thames Valley
- Fire: Oxfordshire
- Ambulance: South Central
- UK Parliament: Henley and Thame

Waterstock is a village and civil parish on the River Thame about 4.5 miles (7 km) west of the market town of Thame in Oxfordshire. The parish is bounded to the north and west by the river, to the south largely by the A418 main road, and to the east largely by the minor road between Tiddington and Ickford Bridge across the Thame. On the north side of the parish, the river forms the county boundary with Buckinghamshire as well as the parish boundary with Ickford and Worminghall. Waterstock village is on a minor road north of the A418 and is surrounded by open farming land. In the village are about 50 houses and a farm along one main street.

== History ==
Waterstock's toponym is derived from the Old English for "Waterplace".

Waterstock Mill is recorded in the Domesday Book of 1086. It was most likely on the same site as the current mill, which is a 15th-century building on a small island in the River Thame. The mill is a two-storey L-shaped building, with a timber frame filled in with brick nogging. It was rebuilt in the Elizabethan period. In 1957 it was converted and sold.

Many of the parish's fields show ridge-and-furrow strip cultivation. In 1279 there were probably about 200 inhabitants, but after the Black Death the population decreased to 51 persons over the age of 14.

Waterstock's oldest buildings are the two thatched cottages, one thought to date from late in the 13th or early in the 14th century and the other from the 16th. Orchard End is a medieval cruck house, its smoke-blackened beams showing that it was originally a two-bay open hall house. The village's single street is flanked by cottages built of stone or local brick, some retaining the small buildings in the gardens, originally privies or pig-sties. At one end of the village, Home Farm is a 17th-century timber-framed house with its thatched barn and 17th-century granary. The 18th-century Park Farm is beyond.

The grounds of Waterstock House are next to the church. The manor house was built in 1787 to designs by the architect SP Cockerell. It was demolished in 1953 or 1956 after the servants' quarters were converted into the present substantial residence. The stone-built stables are 18th-century and probably contemporary with the 1787 house. They are now the Waterstock Equestrian Centre.

Near Waterstock Mill is Bow Bridge: a small, single-arch brick bridge built for Diana Ashhurst in 1790. By the entrance to Waterstock House is the Pump House dated 1898, a small building with a "Rhenish helm" roof reminiscent of a Saxon tower. Many of the villagers used to collect water from it until the village's mains water supply was installed in 1951.

Opposite the church are Church Farm Cottages and the Old Rectory, a substantial stone-built 18th-century house, the only other 'gentlemen's house'. In the 20th century it was the home of the violinist Manoug Parikian, his wife Diana Parikian, the antiquarian bookseller, and their two sons, until his sudden death on Christmas Eve 1987. He is buried in St Leonard's churchyard. Richard Ellis the Californian astronomer lived in the Old School House while a graduate student at Oxford from 1971 to 1974.

== Parish church ==
Waterstock seems to have had a parish church since at least 1190. The current Church of England parish church of Saint Leonard was built at the end of the 15th century. The nave and chancel were rebuilt in 1790, and in 1858 the Gothic Revival architect G.E. Street restored the building. It is the burial place of the early-17th-century Puritan writer William 'Eternity' Tipping.

Remnants of medieval window glass were recovered after the English Reformation and have been inserted above the armorial Ashurst window. This window, together with monuments in the church, records the families of local squirearchy who inhabited the manor house and retained its patronage until 1957. As well as regular church services, meetings and concerts are held in the church.

== Economy ==
Many of the houses in Waterstock have their own stables. Waterstock House Training Centre was once the main equestrian centre of the area, and was once owned by the horse trainer Lars Sederholm.

== Amenities ==
Junction 8A of the M40 motorway and Oxford Services motorway service station are in the parish. There is also a public golf course. The Oxfordshire Way traverses the parish and crosses the River Thame by Bow Bridge near Waterstock Mill. There is a Waterstock and Tiddington Women's Institute.
