= Cathal Daniels =

Irish eventing rider

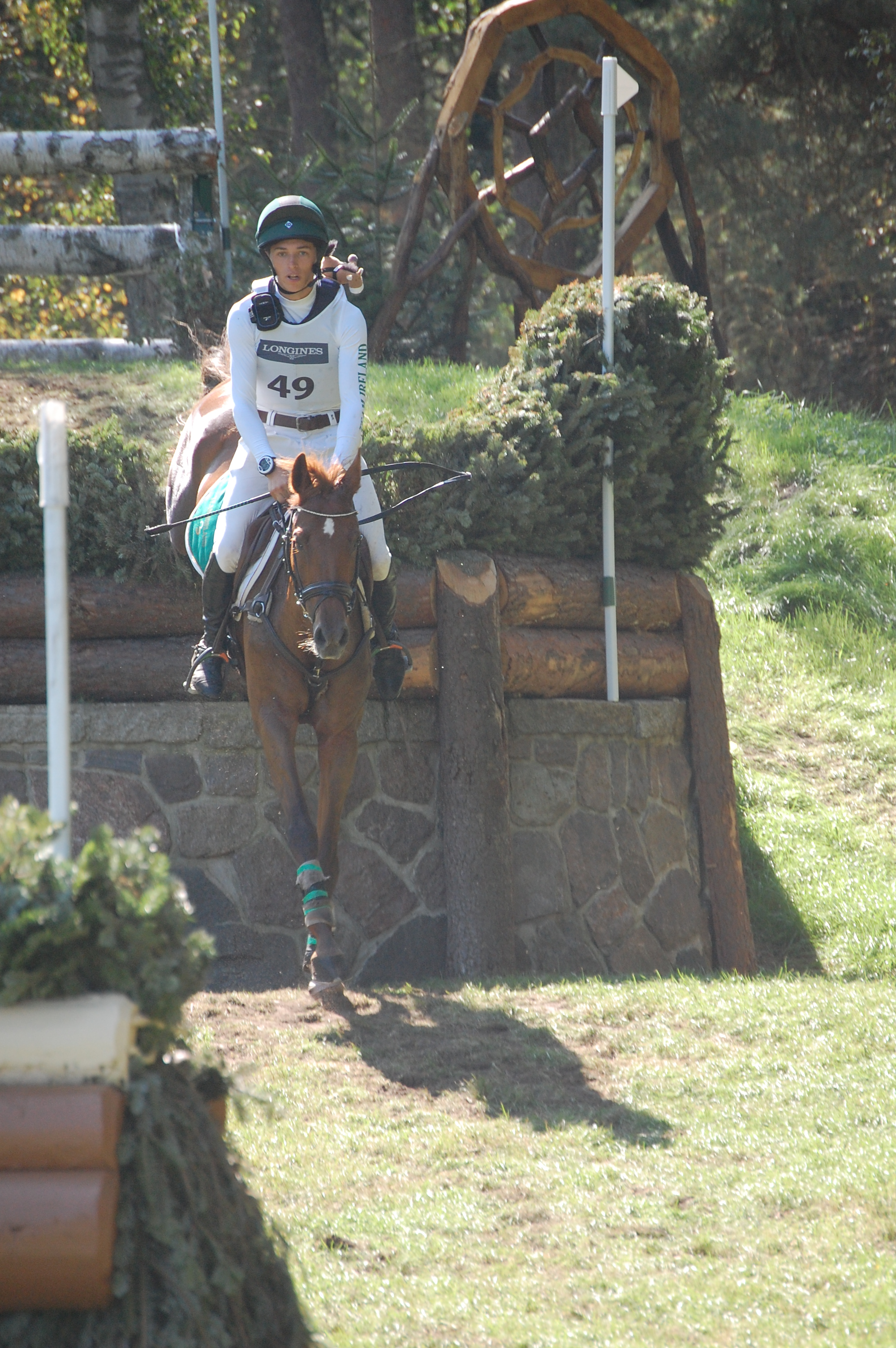

Personal information
- Born: 13 September 1996 (age 29)
Medal record
Equestrian
Representing Ireland
World Championships
Silver medal – second place	2018 Tryon	Team eventing
European Championships
Bronze medal – third place	2019 Luhmühlen	Individual eventing

Cathal Daniels (born 13 September 1996) is an Irish eventing rider. A two-time championship medalist, he won a team silver medal at the 2018 World Equestrian Games, and an individual bronze medal at the 2019 European Championships.

Daniels won several medals at the European pony, junior and young riders eventing championships from 2012 to 2017, including one individual and three team gold medals.

== CCI***** Results ==
Results
Event	Kentucky	Badminton	Luhmühlen	Burghley	Pau	Adelaide
2016					12th (Rioghan Rua)	
2017		33rd (Rioghan Rua)				
2018			7th (Rioghan Rua)			
EL = Eliminated; RET = Retired; WD = Withdrew

== International Championship Results ==
Results
Year	Event	Horse	Placing	Notes
2012	European Pony Championships	Master Murrose	1st place, gold medalist(s)	Team
2012	European Pony Championships	Master Murrose	1st place, gold medalist(s)	Individual
2013	European Junior Championships	Rioghan Rua	1st place, gold medalist(s)	Team
2013	European Junior Championships	Rioghan Rua	7th	Individual
2014	European Junior Championships	Rioghan Rua	1st place, gold medalist(s)	Team
2014	European Junior Championships	Rioghan Rua	2nd place, silver medalist(s)	Individual
2014	World Young Horse Championships	Rioghan Rua	16th	CCI**
2015	European Young Rider Championships	Rioghan Rua	3rd place, bronze medalist(s)	Team
2015	European Young Rider Championships	Rioghan Rua	6th	Individual
2016	World Young Horse Championships	Sammy Davis Junior	14th	CCI**
2017	European Young Rider Championships	Sammy Davis Junior	9th	Team
2017	European Young Rider Championships	Sammy Davis Junior	4th	Individual
2018	World Equestrian Games	Rioghan Rua	2nd place, silver medalist(s)	Team
2018	World Equestrian Games	Rioghan Rua	26th	Individual
2019	European Championships	Rioghan Rua	6th	Team
2019	European Championships	Rioghan Rua	3rd place, bronze medalist(s)	Individual
2019	World Young Horse Championships	CDS Boleybawn Freedo	14th	CCI**
2019	World Young Horse Championships	Harieko DHI	EL	CCI***
2020	World Young Horse Championships	LEB Empress	5th	CCI**
2020	World Young Horse Championships	Shannondale Mari	RET	CCI***
EL = Eliminated; RET = Retired; WD = Withdrew
