= Stroller (horse) =

Show jumping champion

- Breed: Thoroughbred x Connemara
- Sex: Gelding
- Foaled: 1950
- Colour: Bay, star, near hind sock
- Owner: Marion Mould

Stroller
Medal record

Equestrian

Olympic Games
Silver medal – second place	1968 Mexico City	Individual jumping

Women's World Championships
Gold medal – first place	1965 Hickstead	Individual Jumping
Silver medal – second place	1970 Copenhagen	Individual Jumping

Stroller (1950–1986) was a bay gelding who was the only pony to compete at the Olympics in show jumping. He stood about 14.1 hands (57 inches, 145 cm).

He was a member of the British team who competed in the 1968 Olympics in Mexico, ridden by Marion Coakes. Bill Steinkraus and Snowbound won the Gold Medal while Marion and Stroller won the Individual Silver Medal, only four faults behind Steinkraus. Stroller jumped one of the only two clear rounds in the Olympic individual championship. In 1967, Marion rode Stroller to victory in the Hickstead Derby, the only pony to have ever won this event. This partnership won the Wills Hickstead Gold Medal, for points gained in the major events during the year, for five years consecutively from 1965 to 1970. Stroller was the grand age of 20 when he won the 1970 Hamburg Derby. The pair won 61 international competitions.

He was a crossbred horse, by a Thoroughbred sire out of a Connemara pony mare. Stroller died of a heart attack at a good age of 36 in 1986, after 15 years of happy retirement. He is buried at Barton-on-Sea Golf Club, New Milton, Hampshire, England.
