= List of Playboy Playmates of 1962 =

The following is a list of Playboy Playmates of 1962. Playboy magazine names its Playmate of the Month each month throughout the year.

== January ==
Merle Pertile

Personal details
- Born: November 23, 1941 Whittier, California, U.S.
- Died: November 28, 1997 (aged 56) Lake Arrowhead, California, U.S.
- Height: 5 ft 5 in (165 cm)

Merle Pertile (November 23, 1941 – November 28, 1997) was an American model and actress. She was Playboy magazine's Playmate of the Month for its January 1962 issue. Her centerfold was photographed by Frank Bez.

According to The Playmate Book, Pertile died on November 28, 1997, aged 56, in Lake Arrowhead, California, from complications following heart surgery.

== February ==
Kari Knudsen

Personal details
- Born: January 17, 1939 (age 87) Romsdal, Norway
- Height: 5 ft 4 in (163 cm)

Kari Knudsen (born January 17, 1939) is a Norwegian model. She was Playboy magazine's Playmate of the Month for its February 1962 issue. Her centerfold was photographed by Justin Kerr and Barbara Kerr.

== March ==
Pamela Anne Gordon Johnson

Personal details
- Born: Pamela Anne Gordon; February 10, 1943 British Columbia, Canada
- Died: January 25, 2023 (aged 79) Abbotsford, British Columbia, Canada
- Height: 5 ft 1 in (155 cm)

Pamela Gordon Johnson (born Pamela Anne Gordon; February 10, 1943 – January 25, 2023) was a Canadian model and actress. She was Playboy magazine's Playmate of the Month for its March 1962 issue.

Her centerfold was photographed by Mario Casilli and Ken Honey.

Gordon went on to work as a Bunny at the Chicago Playboy Club. She also was named one of the top Canadians of 1962 by Liberty magazine.

Pam died on January 25, 2023, at Abbotsford Regional Hospital, in Abbotsford, British Columbia, Canada from a heart attack after a bout of pneumonia. Pam was 79.

== April ==
Roberta Mary "Bobbie" Lane

Personal details
- Born: March 14, 1943 (age 83) Queens, New York, U.S.
- Height: 5 ft 2 in (157 cm)

Roberta Mary Lane (born March 14, 1943) is an American model. She was Playboy magazine's Playmate of the Month for its April 1962 issue.

Her centerfold was photographed by Frank Eck.

Bobbie married Nadim Sawalha in 1961, a Jordanian-British actor. They are the parents of actresses Nadia Sawalha, Julia Sawalha and Dina Sawalha. He appeared in two Bond films, The Spy Who Loved Me (1977) and The Living Daylights (1987).

== May ==
Marya Carter

Personal details
- Born: Zella Maria Grajeda; May 12, 1942 (age 84) Los Angeles County, California, U.S.
- Height: 5 ft 8.5 in (174 cm)

Marya Carter (born Zella Maria Grajeda; May 12, 1942) is an American model and actress. She was Playboy magazine's Playmate of the month for its May 1962 issue. Her centerfold was photographed by Paul Morton Smith.

During the 1960s and 70s, Carter pursued an acting career, mostly appearing in B-movies and guest roles on television. She was married to Steve Ihnat, a character actor; they had a son, Stefan. Ihnat died in 1972 of a heart attack on Marya's 30th birthday.

Marya was subsequently married to Peter Marshall (entertainer), a game show host.

== June ==
Merissa Mathes

Personal details
- Born: Marrisa Mathes; January 26, 1940 (age 86) Moses Lake, Washington, U.S.
- Height: 5 ft 4.5 in (164 cm)

Merissa Mathes (born Marrisa Mathes; January 26, 1940) is an American actress and model. She was Playboy magazine's Playmate of the Month for its June 1962 issue. Her centerfold was photographed by Glenn Otto.

During the early to mid-1960s, she pursued an acting career, appearing in B-movies and series television. She appeared in Bernard McEveety's 1966 Ride Beyond Vengeance. She also had a small role the next year in Martin Scorsese's film directing debut, Who's That Knocking at My Door.

== July ==
Unne Terjesen

Personal details
- Born: March 20, 1943 (age 83) Odda, Norway
- Height: 5 ft 7 in (170 cm)

Unne Terjesen (born March 20, 1943) is a Norwegian model who is best known for being Playboy magazine's Playmate of the Month for its July 1962 issue. Her centerfold was photographed by Mario Casilli.

== August ==
Jan Roberts

Personal details
- Born: June 9, 1939 (age 87) Brooklyn, New York, U.S.
- Height: 5 ft 5 in (165 cm)

Jan Roberts (born June 9, 1939) is a former American model who was Playboy magazine's Playmate of the Month for its August 1962 issue. Her centerfold was photographed by Pompeo Posar. She also appeared in the issues for January 1963, July 1963, October 1964, and August 1966.

== September ==
Mickey Winters

Personal details
- Born: September 30, 1940 (age 86) Paris, France
- Height: 5 ft (152 cm)

Mickey Winters (born September 30, 1940) is an American model who was Playboy magazine's Playmate of the Month for its September 1962 issue. Her centerfold was photographed by Don Bronstein.

== October ==
Laura Young

Personal details
- Born: May 22, 1938 Long Branch, New Jersey, U.S.
- Died: November 27, 1999 (aged 61)
- Height: 5 ft 6 in (168 cm)

Laura Young (May 22, 1938 – November 27, 1999) was an American model. She was Playboy magazine's Playmate of the Month for its October 1962 issue. Her centerfold was photographed by Pompeo Posar, his first ever centerfold taken, despite Jan Roberts being published earlier. She was a finalist for that year's Playmate of the Year title.

Young died of cancer on November 27, 1999.

== November ==
Avis Kimble

Personal details
- Born: October 18, 1944 (age 82) Chicago, Illinois, U.S.
- Height: 5 ft 5.5 in (166 cm)

Avis Kimble (born October 18, 1944) is an American model. At age 17 she was photographed by Jon Pownall to become Playboy magazine's Playmate of the Month for its November 1962 issue, and was a finalist for the Playmate of the Year 1963 title.

== December ==
June Cochran Englehart

Playboy Playmate of the Year
- 1963
- Preceded by: Christa Speck
- Succeeded by: Donna Michelle

Personal details
- Born: February 20, 1942 Jefferson County, Tennessee, U.S.
- Died: May 21, 2004 (aged 62) Madison, Wisconsin, U.S.
- Height: 5 ft 2 in (157 cm)

June Cochran Englehart (February 20, 1942 – May 21, 2004) was an American model and beauty queen. Cochran won the Miss Indiana USA pageant in 1960. She was Playboy magazine's Playmate of the Month for December 1962, and Playmate of the Year for 1963.

Her original pictorial was photographed by Don Bronstein.

== See also ==
- List of people in Playboy 1960–1969

Merle Pertile	Kari Knudsen	Pamela Gordon	Roberta Lane	Marya Carter	Merissa Mathes
Unne Terjesen	Jan Roberts	Mickey Winters	Laura Young	Avis Kimble	June Cochran
