= Sidney Dufresne =

French eventing rider

Personal information
- Born: 12 April 1986 (age 40)
Medal record
Equestrian
Representing France
World Championships
Bronze medal – third place	2018 Tryon	Team eventing

Sidney Dufresne (born 12 April 1986) is a French eventing rider. Representing France, he competed at the 2018 World Equestrian Games in Tryon, North Carolina, where he won a bronze medal with the French team and was placed 18th individually.

Dufresne also competed at the 2017 edition of the European Eventing Championships, where he was placed 42nd individually and 11th in the team event.
