= Caroline Bradley =

British showjumper (1946–1983)

Caroline Frances Bradley MBE
- on Marius (Milton's father)

Personal information
- National team: Great Britain
- Born: 4 April 1946 Oxford, England
- Died: 1 June 1983 (aged 37) Ipswich, England
- Occupation: Equestrian

Sport
- Sport: Showjumping
- Coached by: Lars Sederholm

Caroline Frances Bradley MBE (4 April 1946 – 1 June 1983) was an international British show-jumper, becoming the first female winner of the Puissance at the Horse of the Year Show in 1974, an era when the sport was still largely dominated by male riders. She went on to win team gold medals in World and European championships in 1978 and 1979 respectively and had considerable individual success, winning the grand prix at Hickstead in 1980 and the Queen Elizabeth II Cup in 1978 and 1980. She died, aged 37, after collapsing at the Suffolk Show having suffered a heart attack.

== Early life ==
Bradley was born in Oxford on 4 April 1946. She and her older sister Judith had their own ponies and learned to ride at an early age. She took part in junior showjumping competitions before progressing to horses at the age of fifteen. She was also a gifted hockey player, representing her country while still at Northampton High School for Girls. On leaving school she spent eighteen months as a working pupil at the Waterstock House Training Centre, Oxfordshire where she was taught by Lars Sederholm, former consultant head of training for the British Showjumping Association. This gave her a good grounding in riding techniques and helped to make her one of the most technically correct riders in the sport.

== Equestrian career ==
Bradley made her debut on the British team, riding a horse called Franco, at the Dublin Horse Show in 1966 at the age of 20. She and Franco were part of the victorious British team at the nations' cup in Leipzig in 1967 and she won the civilian open championship at Toronto in 1968. In the following year she competed in the Badminton Horse Trials on Alpaca, a horse belonging to her former trainer, Lars Sederholm. She won Daily Express Sportswoman of the year in 1979 and in 1980 she was made an MBE by Queen Elizabeth II.

Her most famous horses were Tigre and 'Marius Silver Jubilee', better known as 'Milton' who later became the mount of internationally successful show-jumper John Whitaker.

== Death ==
Bradley had just completed the first round in the Suffolk Show in 1983, an event being attended by Princess Margaret, when she collapsed and could not be revived. A later inquest determined that she had suffered heart failure. She was 37 years old.

She is buried in Priors Marston in Warwickshire, where she had lived for a number of years.
