= Milton (horse) =

Show jumping horse

- Breed: British Sport Horse
- Sire: Marius (Dutch Warmblood)
- Grandsire: Marco Polo (Trakehner)
- Dam: Aston Answer (Irish Draught Sport Horse)
- Maternal grandsire: Any Questions (Anglo Arabian x Thoroughbred)
- Sex: Gelding
- Foaled: 16 February 1977
- Country: United Kingdom
- Colour: Grey
- Breeder: John Harding-Rolls
- Owner: Caroline Bradley, then after her death, Tom & Doreen Bradley (her parents)

Earnings
- £1.25 million

Milton
Medal record

Equestrian

World Championships
Silver medal – second place	1990 Stockholm	Individual show jumping
Bronze medal – third place	1990 Stockholm	Team show jumping

European Championships
Gold medal – first place	1989 Rotterdam	Individual show jumping
Gold medal – first place	1989 Rotterdam	Team show jumping
Silver medal – second place	1987 St Gallen	Individual show jumping
Gold medal – first place	1987 St Gallen	Team show jumping

Marius Silver Jubilee, better known as Milton, (16 February 1977 – 4 July 1999) was a successful showjumping horse ridden by John Whitaker. He was a grey gelding and stood 16.2 hands (66 inches, 168 cm) high at the withers.

== Biography ==
Foaled in 1977, Milton was by Dutch Warmblood Marius, out of Irish Draught Aston Answers. His lines included successful sportshorses in both paternal and maternal lines, his sire being an international level and his dam a Grade A national level jumper.

When Milton was young, Caroline Bradley, who had ridden Marius to international success, told her parents Milton would be her Olympic mount. She trained him until her death in 1983, after which many offers were made to her parents to buy the gelding, who had already proven his talent. They kept the horse.

Stephen Hadley, who later became an FEI TV show jumping commentator, rode Milton for a short time, before he became a mount of the world-renowned international rider John Whitaker in 1985 and entered international competition.

=== Career ===
During his competitive career, Milton achieved many international victories, and became the first horse outside the racing world to win more than £1.25 million in prize money. Throughout his career, Milton rarely touched a rail or refused a fence. The gelding was a favourite with the crowd, many times ending a successful round with a leap into the air. Even after his retirement at the 1994 Olympia Horse Show, he was adored by all. Milton died on 4 July 1999. He was buried on the Whitakers' farm in Yorkshire.

== Achievements ==
- Over £1.25 million in prize money won
- Winner of the 1986 Du Maurier Limited International competition, Spruce Meadows, then the richest (in total prize money) show jumping competition in the world.
- Individual Silver and Team Gold 1987 European Championships in St Gallen
- Individual and Team Gold 1989 European Championships in Rotterdam
- Winner of the 1990 FEI World Cup Final in Dortmund
- Individual Silver and Team Bronze 1990 World Equestrian Games in Stockholm
- Winner of the 1991 FEI World Cup Final in Gothenburg

== See also ==
- List of historical horses
