= Lucy Davis (equestrian) =

American equestrian

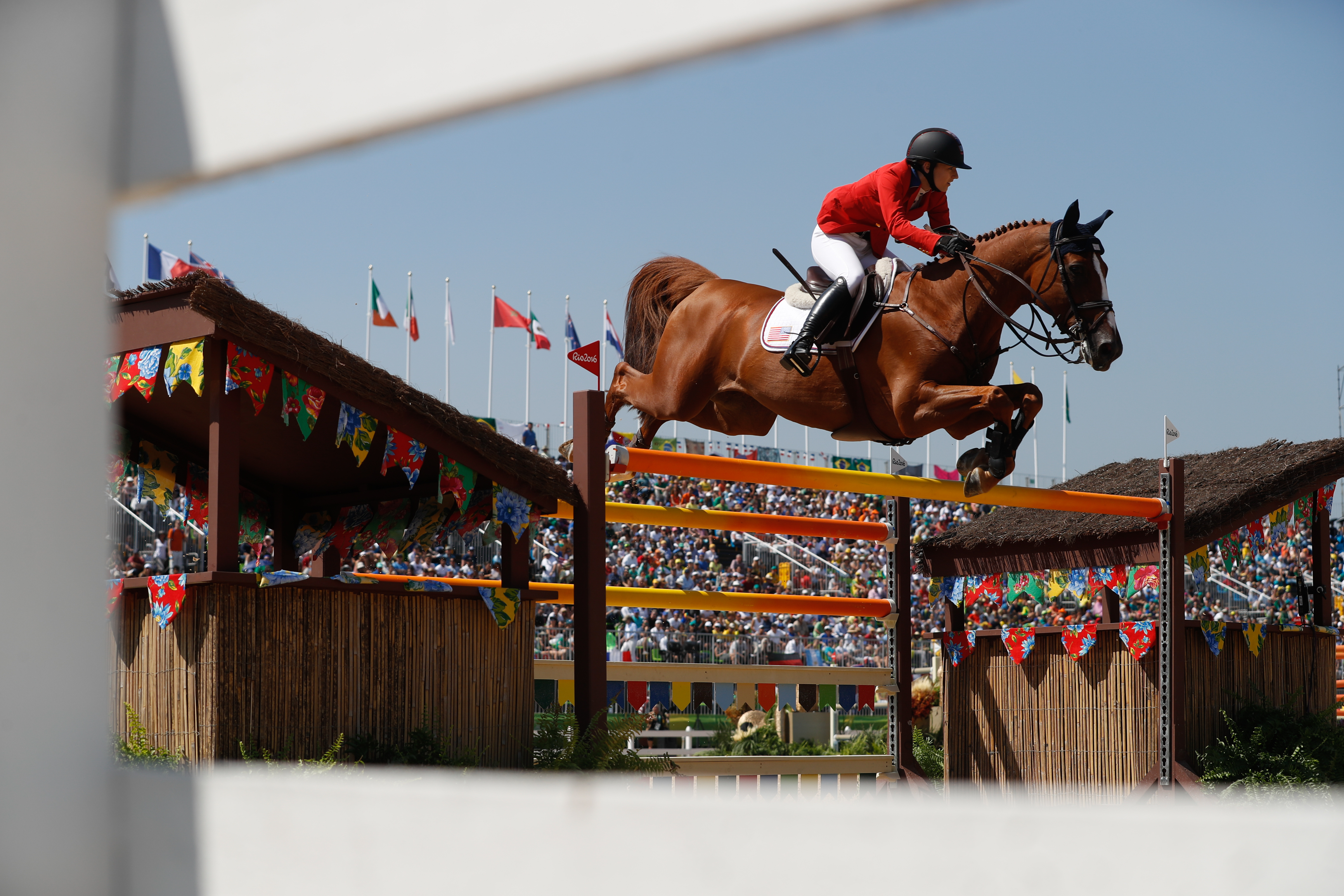
- Davis riding Barron at the 2016 Summer Olympics

Personal information
- Full name: Lucy Davis
- Born: Lucy Davis; October 22, 1992 (age 33) Los Angeles, California, U.S.

Sport
- Coached by: Markus Beerbaum
Medal record
Equestrian
Representing the United States
Olympic Games
Silver medal – second place	2016 Rio de Janeiro	Team jumping
World Championships
Bronze medal – third place	2014 Normandy	Team jumping

Lucy Davis (born October 22, 1992) is an American show jumping competitor and 2016 Olympian.

== Life and career ==
Davis was born October 22, 1992, in Los Angeles. She grew up in California and started taking riding lessons at the age of five. She grew as a rider and was supported by her family, who had some equestrian background, as her grandfather, Robert Barron Frieze, was a jockey's agent, and her mother rode casually. Davis accompanied her mother to the barn a few times a week and quickly became interested in horses. Her early riding career was with trainer Chacha Levinson at the Sullivan Canyon Preservation Association. She later moved to train with Archie Cox at Middle Ranch to compete in the hunters and equitation on the A and AA levels. During her time with Cox, Davis won many national championships in the equitation and hunters which include World Champion Hunter Rider in 2007. Davis showed in the pony and junior hunters competitive divisions before convincing her mother to let her compete in the jumper ring when she was fourteen. From then on, she advanced from the Low Junior Jumpers (1.20m) on her first junior jumper, Mister Mind. Growing up, Davis also played soccer, but she later dropped the sport at age sixteen to pursue equestrian competition full-time.

Davis went to her first international competition when she attended the North American Junior and Young Rider Championships (NAJYRC). In 2009, she was the Individual Silver medalist with True Love, and in 2010 was on the Zone 10 Gold Medal winning team.

Davis graduated from Stanford University (California). She is now based in Europe and travels the Western European circuit while still making frequent appearances in the United States show circuit.

Davis is now in the upper levels of show jumping and was selected to be a member on the 2016 US Olympic Show Jumping Team that competed in Rio de Janeiro. She was selected to compete with her top mount, Barron, whom she has competed with in Nations Cups, World Cup Finals, and the 2014 World Equestrian Games.

Davis placed tenth at the 2012 U.S. Olympic trials but did not make the Olympic team that year. Davis and her teammates earned a bronze medal in team jumping at the 2014 FEI World Equestrian Games. Davis qualified for the 2016 Summer Olympics in the individual and team show jumping events. She went on to take the silver medal in the team competition and qualified for the individual final. Today, she is still the youngest female Olympic medalist in Equestrian Show Jumping for Team USA.

== Education ==
Davis is a 2011 graduate of Harvard-Westlake School in Studio City, Los Angeles. Davis graduated from Stanford University in 2015 with a degree in architecture.
