= Lars Sederholm =

Swedish-British equestrian trainer

Lars Sederholm (27 November 1935 – 12 October 2023) was a Swedish-British equestrian trainer and former consultant head of training for the British Showjumping Association. An obituary in Horse & Hound described Sederholm as "[o]ne of the outstanding horsemen of the 20th century"

Sederholm was based in Oxfordshire at the Waterstock Horse Training Centre.
