= Lord of Theizé =

Show jumping horse

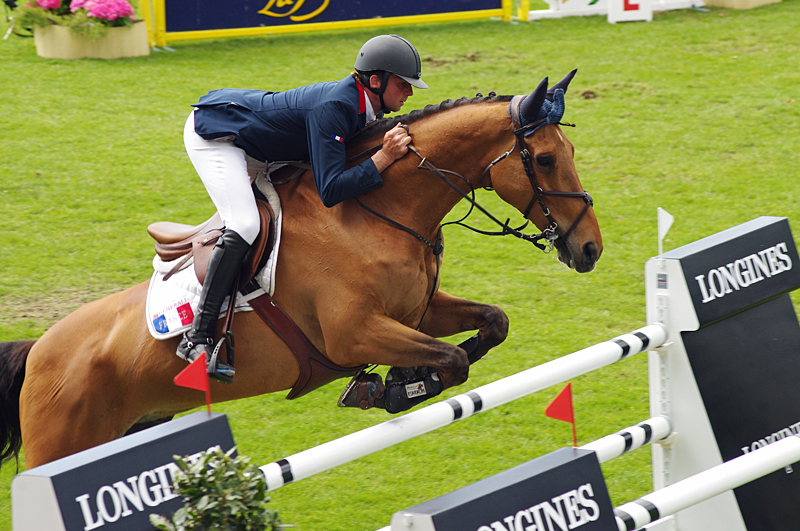
Lord of Theizé in 2013

Lord of Theizé (April 14, 1999 – August 29, 2016) was a Selle Français show jumping horse which won a silver medal at the 2010 FEI World Equestrian Games and the European Championships in 2011. He was put into semi-retirement in September 2014 and in total retirement in December 2015. He was euthanized after a stroke on 29 August 2016.
