= Malcolm Pyrah =

British equestrian

Personal information
- Nationality: British
- Born: 26 August 1941 (age 83); Nottingham, England

Sport
- Sport: Equestrian

Malcolm Pyrah (born 26 August 1941) is a British equestrian. He competed in two events at the 1988 Summer Olympics.
