= Adrienne Sternlicht =

American show jumper

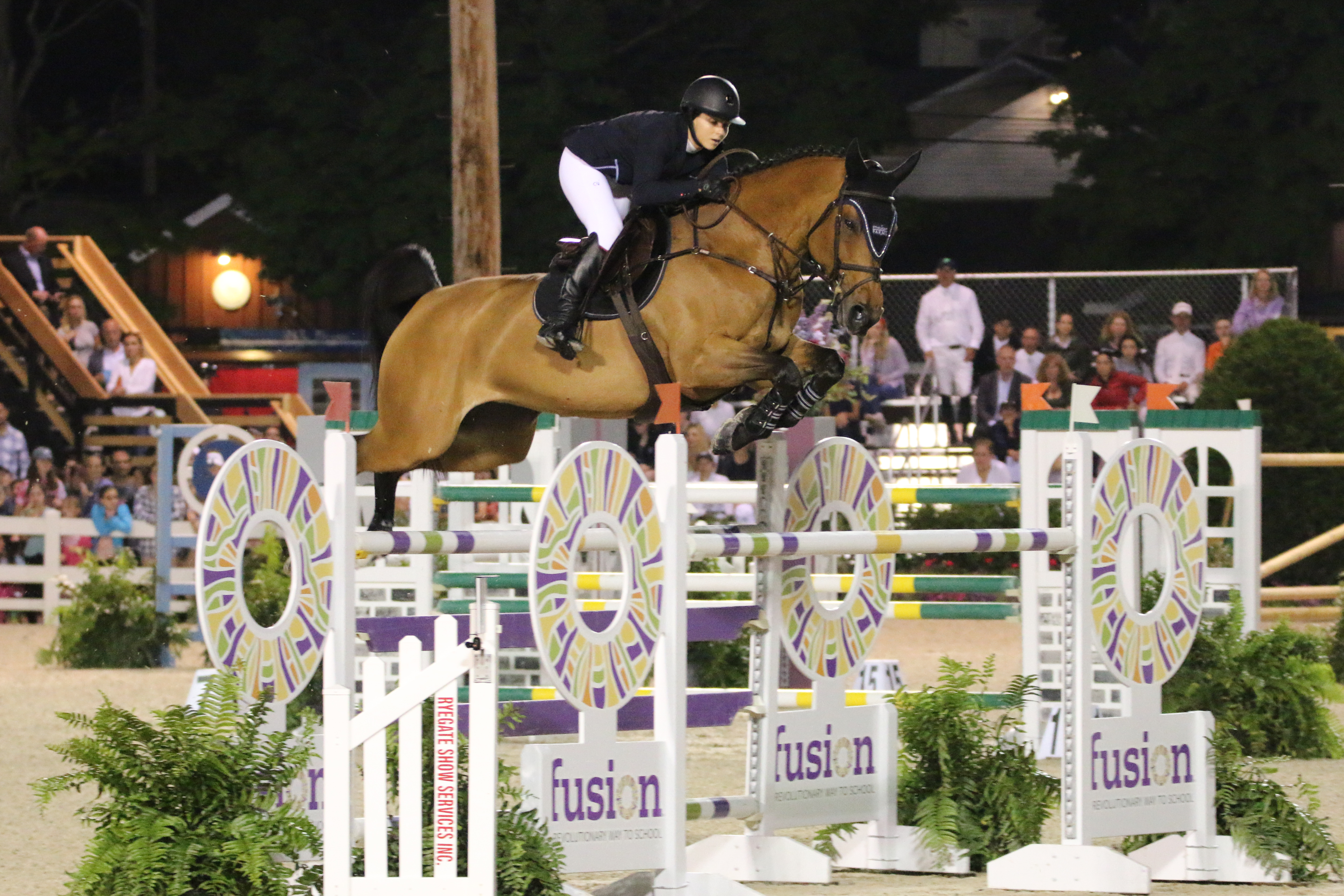
- Adrienne Sterlincht and Cristalline competing in the Grand Prix at the Devon Horse Show

Personal information
- National team: America
- Born: May 9, 1993 (age 33)
- Education: Brown University
- Parent: Barry Sternlicht Mimi Sternlicht

Sport
- Sport: Equestrian
- Event: Show Jumping
- Coached by: McLain Ward

Achievements and titles
- Highest world ranking: 37th
Medal record
World Championships
Gold medal – first place	2018 Tryon	Team jumping

Adrienne Sternlicht (born 1993) is an American show jumping rider, most notable for being part of the gold medal-winning team at the 2018 World Equestrian Games in Tryon, North Carolina. She is most well known for riding the mare, Cristalline.

She is ranked 77th in the world as of May 2020.

== Early life ==
Adrienne Sternlicht was born on May 9, 1993, to Barry Sternlicht and Mimi Sternlicht.

Adrienne Sternlicht first rode at a play date when she was six years old. Soon after, she began taking riding lessons and eventually moved to training at Heritage Farm in Katonah, New York, where she became more competitive. She worked with Heritage Farm for five years before moving her horses to closer to her boarding school in Connecticut and began training with Linda Langmeier. While in high school, Sternlicht rode only part-time, instead focusing mostly on academics and being on the squash team for her school. Riding was contingent on schoolwork, and when she got into Brown University, her parents allowed her to purchase a few horses, two of which she kept close to school. During this time she worked with horses on her own and learned more about her horses and their care by spending more time with them.

While in school, Sternlicht ramped up her training and went to compete in Europe for the first time under the training of Laura Kraut. However, during May 2015, Sternlicht worked with McLain Ward for the first time at The Devon Horse Show, which kickstarted her riding with the renowned rider and trainer. She began to train with him full-time following the completion of the 2016 Olympic Games in Rio de Janeiro.

== Professional career ==
In 2016, after graduating from Brown University with a degree in public policy, Sternlicht decided to focus full-time on her riding. It was in 2016 that Sternlicht also acquired Cristalline, a Bavarian Warmblood mare that had jumped clear at the World Cup Finals that year with Australian Chris Chugg, that shot her into stardom.

The following year, 2017, brought Sternlicht's first international team Nations Cup competitions in Coapexpan, Mexico where they won the team silver medal. From there she began to compete in bigger 5* competitions. Following several top results during the 2018 winter circuit, Sternlicht was named to the short-list for the 2018 World Equestrian Games. She had several good results, including her first Grand Prix win in the $50,000 Old Salem Farm Grand Prix in May, at various selection events which resulted in her selection to the team. Despite a disappointing first round, Sternlicht and Cristalline jumped clear in the following round and the team ended up with the gold medal. She also finished 11th individually.

Following the World Equestrian Games, Cristalline was injured but Sternlicht continued to have solid results with Fantast, Quidam Mb, and Toulago. In the fall of 2019, Sternlicht won two World Cup qualifiers on Benny's Legacy and a CSI4* Grand Prix on Just A Gamble. In March 2020, Cristalline returned to international competition at the Live Oak International World Cup Qualifier where the pair placed third. They were planning on competing at the 2020 FEI World Cup Jumping Finals; however, the event was cancelled due to the COVID-19 pandemic.

Sternlicht has stated that she struggles with the mental side of the sport but has made progress by working with mind architect, Peter Crone.

== Major results ==
Major Results
Year	Place	Horse	Event	Rating	Show	Location
2020	1	Just A Gamble	$150,000 Nations Cup	CSIO4*	Winter Equestrian Festival	Wellington, FL (USA)
2019	1	Just A Gamble	$209,000 Holiday & Horses Grand Prix	CSI4*	WEF Pre-Circuit	Wellington, FL (USA)
2019	1	Benny's Legacy	Las Vegas World Cup Qualifier	CSI3*-W	Las Vegas National	Las Vegas, NV (USA)
2019	1	Benny's Legacy	Thermal World Cup Qualifier	CSI3*-W	National Sunshine Series	Thermal, CA (USA)
2019	1	Toulago	Masters One 1.55m	CSI5*	Longines Masters of New York	Uniondale, NY (USA)
2019	1	Fantast	Masters One 1.45m	CSI5*	Longines Masters of New York	Uniondale, NY (USA)
2019	1	Toulago	$150,000 Nations Cup	CSIO4*	Winter Equestrian Festival	Wellington, FL (USA)
2018	Gold	Cristalline	World Equestrian Games - Team	WEG	World Equestrian Games	Tryon, NC (USA)
2018	11th	Cristalline	World Equestrian Games - Individual	WEG	World Equestrian Games	Tryon, NC (USA)
2018	1	Cristalline	Knokke Hipique 1.50m	CSI5*	Knokke Hippique	Knokke-Heist (BEL)
2018	2	Cristalline	$250,000 Sapphire Devon Grand Prix	CSI4*	Devon Horse Show	Devon, PA (USA)
2018	1	Toulago	$50,000 Old Salem Farm Grand Pric	CSI2*	Old Salem Farm	Old Salem, NY (USA)
