= Barbara Kerr =

Canadian equestrian

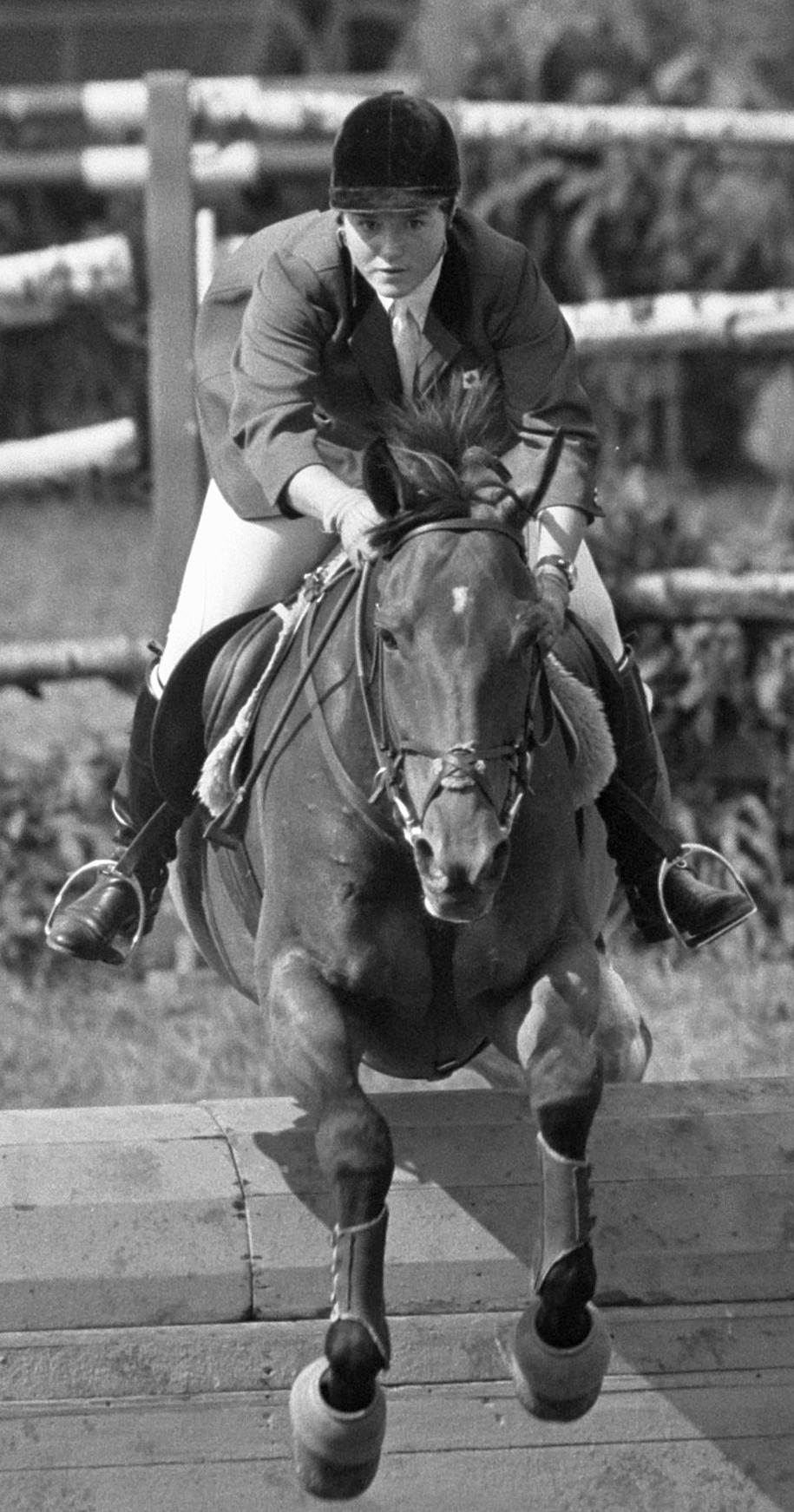
- Barbara Kerr on Australis in 1969

Sport
- Sport: Horse riding
Medal record
Representing Canada
Pan American Games
Gold medal – first place	1971 Cali	Team jumping
Show Jumping World Championships
Bronze medal – third place	1974 La Baule	Women's jumping

Barbara Simpson Kerr is a retired equestrian from Canada who won a gold medal at the 1971 Pan American Games and a bronze medal at the 1974 Show Jumping World Championships. She also won the 1967 and 1981 national jumping titles, the 1969 Aachen Horse Show, the 1972 Rothman's Grand Prix, and the 1972 Calgary International Horse Show.
