= Galoubet A =

- Breed: Selle Français
- Sire: Almé
- Grandsire: Ibrahim
- Dam: Viti (TF)
- Maternal grandsire: Nystag
- Sex: Stallion
- Foaled: 1972
- Colour: Bay
- Owner: Jean François Pellegrin & Meg Douglas-Hamilton

Galoubet A
Medal record

Equestrian

World Championships
Gold medal – first place	1982 Dublin	Jumping Team

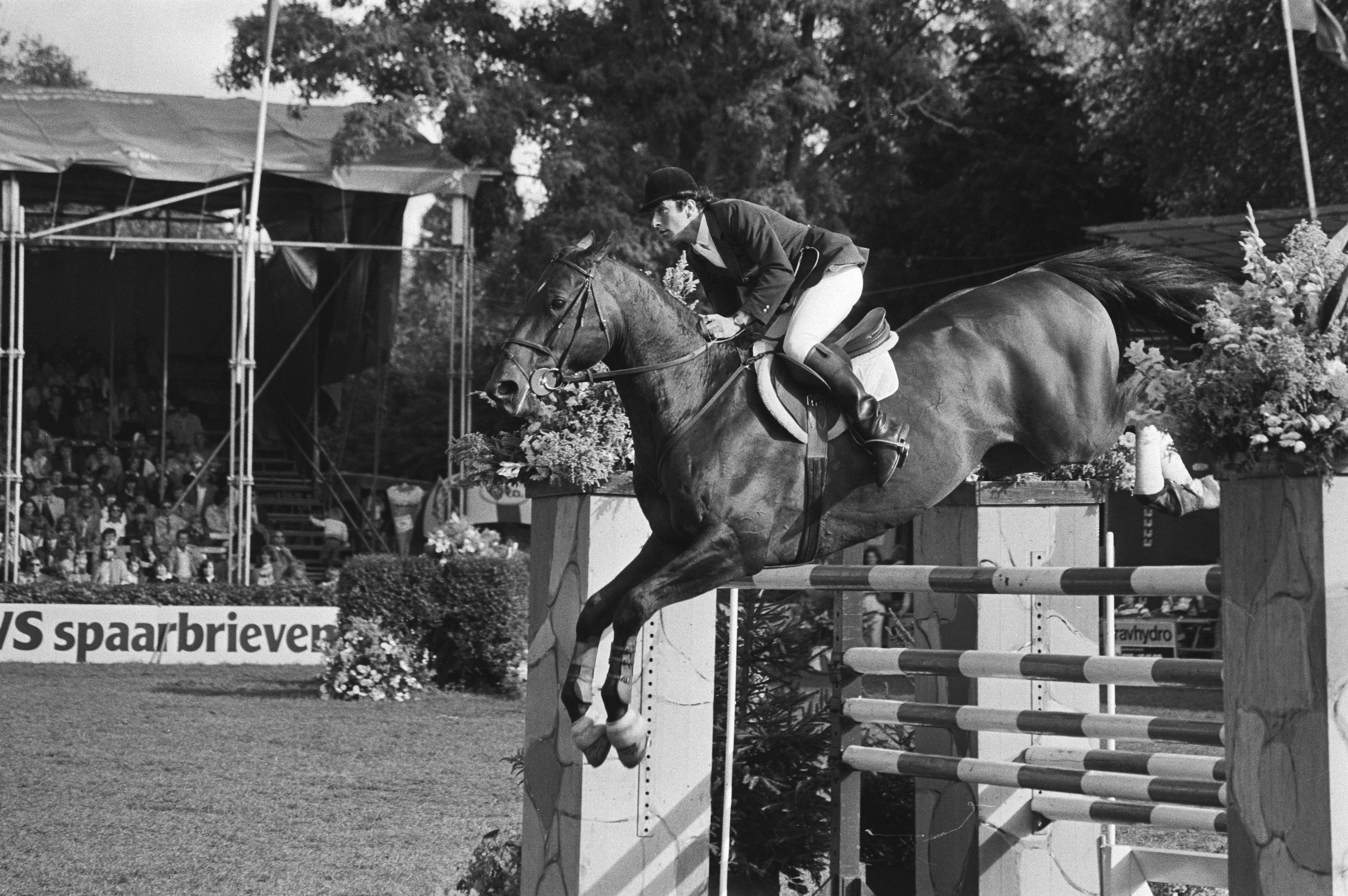
Winnaar Gilles B. de Ballanda (Frankrijk) met Galoubet A. Malesan, Bestanddeelnr 931-6377

Galoubet A (1972–2005) was a horse ridden by the French rider Gilles-Bertran de Ballanda, in International show jumping and is a sire of show jumpers. He stood 17.0 hh (173 cm).

Galoubet was by the great sire Almé out of Viti a trotter mare. He was retired to stud at 10 y.o. and has since sired many top performers. Galoubet ranked third on the WBFSH standings for 2000/2001, largely on the basis of his son Baloubet du Rouet who won three World Cup Final's in a row (Helsinki 1998, Gothenburg 1999, Las Vegas 2000) as well as team bronze at 2000 Olympics in Sydney.

In 2002, Galoubet was the Grand Sire of World Champion - Liscalgot (Ire) at World Equestrian Games in Jerez, Spain through his son Touchdown.

In 2004, his son Baloubet du Rouet won the gold medal at 2004 Olympics in Athens

Also 'Galoubet A has another well known son, Touchdown, dam Lady Willpower. In 1992, Touchdown was the highest placed Irish show jumper at the Barcelona Olympics.

== Achievements ==
- 1979 Won Wiesbaden Grand Prix (at 7 y.o.)
- 1979 15th European Championships
- Champion of France in 1977, 1979 and 1982
- 1980 Winning Nations Cups Teams - in Aachen, Chaudefontaine, Longchamp and Toronto.
- 1980 8th World Cup Final in Baltimore, U.S.A.
- 1980 8th Alternative Olympic Games in Rotterdam.
- 1980/81 Winner of the FEI World Cup Jumping League (Western Europe)
- 1981 Won three World Cup qualifiers in a row at Antwerp, s’Hertogenbosch and Dortmund.
- 1982 Team Gold Show Jumping World Championships in Dublin.
- 1982 5th Individual, at the Show Jumping World Championships

== Sire line tree ==
Sire line descendant tree
- Galoubet A
  - Qredo de Paulstra
    - Caloubet Wood
    - Corsaire de Vauban
    - Quattro B (Ciel d’Espoir)
      - Quantes
      - Quell Charmeur
      - Quando Quando
        - Quarterman
          - Quarterback
      - Quantum Tyme
      - Quatier Latin
      - Que Sera
      - Queeno
      - Quinto
      - Quincy
    - Elf of Jaunière
    - Epson Love
    - Experio
    - Lassergut Hym d’Isigny
    - Idalgo du Donjon
    - VDL Groep Sabech d’Ha
  - Quabri de Laleu
  - Quatoubet du Rouet
  - Quick Star
    - Cardinus
    - Qualitative
    - Quality
    - Quebec
    - Quinticus
    - Obos Quality
    - Quality Touch Z
    - Quilot Z
    - Qualandro
    - Quick Lauro Z
    - Quilfilio
    - Quick Star CH
    - Red Star D'Argent
    - Indy Star
    - Quincy Z
    - Quick Study
    - Star Power
    - Orient Express
      - Aldo du Plessis
    - Vito M
    - Big Star
      - Big Star Jr
      - E-Star
    - Papillon de Brekka
    - Petrus de Plessis
  - Touchdown
  - Skippy II
    - Quorum de Laubry
    - Versailles vd Begijnakker
    - Virus de Laubry
    - Apollo van het Lindenbos
  - Surcouf de Revel
  - Vert et Rouge
  - Baloubet du Rouet
    - Gatsby Vandrin
    - Gershwin de Reis
    - Balou du Rouet
      - Balloon
      - Balougraph
      - Balou Star
      - Baltimore
      - Be Bravo
      - Bisquet Balou
      - Burberry
      - Balou Rubin R
    - Balou Grande Z
    - Chaman
    - Southwind
    - West Side van de Meerputhoeve
    - Babluche van het Gelutt Z
    - Bogeno
    - Bubalu
    - Murat de Reve
    - Napoli du Ry
    - Palloubet d'Halong
    - G & C Arrayan (Antonie W)
    - Balturo
  - Caloubet du Rouet
  - En avant du Rouet
  - Premium de Laubry
  - Pall Mall
  - Taloubet Z
