= Barron (horse) =

Show jumping horse

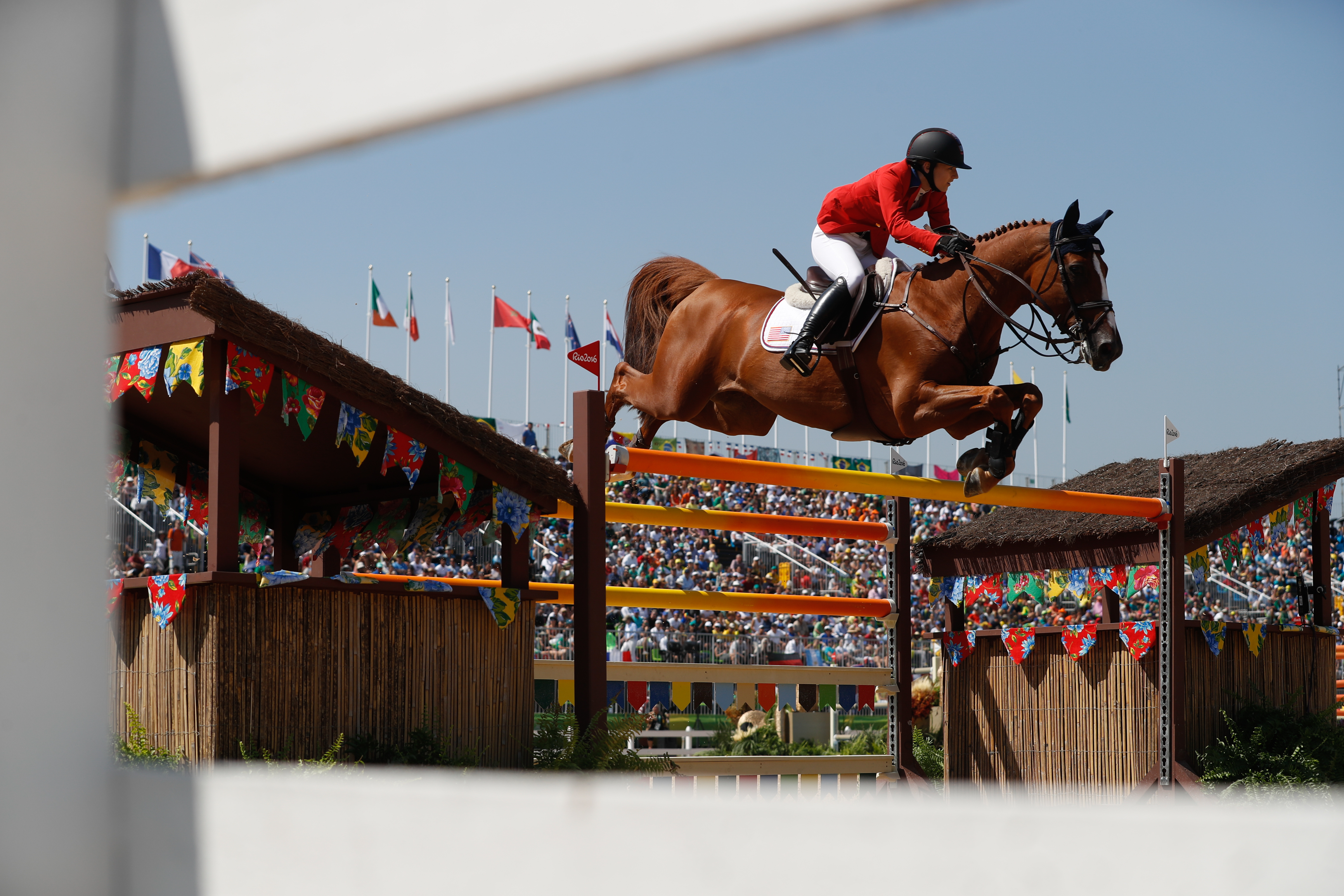
- Barron being ridden by Davis at the 2016 Summer Olympics
- Breed: Belgian Warmblood
- Discipline: Show jumping
- Sire: For Pleasure
- Dam: Vita van het Reithof
- Sex: Gelding
- Foaled: 2004
- Color: Chestnut

Major wins
- Team bronze in 2014 World Equestrian Games, team silver in 2016 Summer Olympics

Barron is a show jumping horse. Ridden by Lucy Davis, he won team medals at the 2014 World Equestrian Games (bronze), and at the 2016 Summer Olympics (silver).

== Life and career ==
Barron is a chestnut Belgian Warmblood gelding foaled in 2004, sired by For Pleasure and out of Vita van het Reithof. He was purchased for American show jumping rider Lucy Davis in 2013. Barron was originally named Underground des Hauts Droits, but was renamed for Davis' grandfather, Robert Barron Frieze, a jockey's agent. In an interview, Davis described Barron as a good horse but said that he could be flighty, and noted that he wears earplugs while in competition because he does not like crowd noise. He competes in a Kimberwick bit and double reins, and is groomed by Tasha Houghton. Davis and Barron's first major competition together was in the 2013 World Cup Final. Barron and Davis competed in the 2014 World Equestrian Games as part of the US show jumping team, which won bronze. The same year they won a total of three 5-star Grand Prix jumping competitions, and Barron was named Horse of the Year. In the Rio 2016 Summer Olympics, they knocked down one rail in the team competition but finished within the required time limit. The team won silver. In the individual competition, Barron and Davis knocked down the rails of two jumps and Barron stepped in the edge of the water jump, incurring a total of 12 faults. They did not make the individual finals.
