= 2018 FEI World Equestrian Games =

2018 equestrian competition

2018 World Equestrian Games
- Host city: Mill Spring, North Carolina
- Nations: 79
- Athletes: 702
- Events: 29 in 8 disciplines
- Opening: September 11, 2018
- Closing: September 23, 2018
- Website: Tryon 2018

The 2018 FEI World Equestrian Games were held in Mill Spring, North Carolina, U.S. at the Tryon International Equestrian Center, from September 11 to September 23, 2018. It was the eighth edition of the games, which are held every four years and run by the International Federation for Equestrian Sports (FEI). This was the second time that North America hosted the Games, the previous time being in 2010, also in the United States.

== Bidding process ==
The initial bidding process for the 2018 edition of the World Equestrian Games started in 2011 with the initial application stage. Eight countries expressed their interest, and five of them became official candidates in 2012: Rabat, Bromont, Budapest, Vienna and Wellington. Australia, Russia and Sweden withdrew before the official candidature phase.

By 2013, four of the official candidates dropped out, leaving only Bromont in the running. However, instead of awarding the Games to Canada, FEI decided to re-open the bidding process on July 1, 2013, as the Bromont bid was lacking financial support. Bromont remained in the running and was joined by two USA candidates (Wellington and Lexington) as well as Great Britain.

Great Britain and Wellington dropped out, leaving only Bromont and Lexington in contention. Bromont was finally awarded the hosting rights on June 9, 2014.

Bromont withdrew from hosting in 2016, as the financial support was not secured. Following Bromont's withdrawal, Mill Spring, North Carolina and Šamorín, Slovakia expressed their interest in hosting the event. Mill Spring was awarded the Games on November 3, 2016.

With the 2018 games, United States became the first nation to host the World Equestrian Games twice.

== Venues ==
- Tryon International Equestrian Center, Mill Spring, North Carolina
  - U.S. Trust Arena – Jumping, Dressage and Eventing (stadium jumping)
  - Tryon Stadium – Ceremonies, Eventing (Dressage) and Para-dressage
  - Covered Arena – Reining and Vaulting
  - Driving Stadium – Driving (Dressage, Obstacle Cones)
  - White Oak Course - Eventing (Cross-country) and Driving (Marathon)
  - TIEC and surrounding farmland - Endurance

== Officials ==
Appointment of (Olympic disciplines) officials was as follows:

Dressage

- (United States) Anne Gribbons (Ground Jury President)
- (Germany) Katrina Wüst (Ground Jury Member)
- (Netherlands) Mariëtte Sanders-van Gansewinkel (Ground Jury Member)
- (United Kingdom) Andrew Gardner (Ground Jury Member)
- (Denmark) Hans-Christian Matthiesen (Ground Jury Member)
- (Sweden) Annette Fransen-Iacobaeus (Ground Jury Member)
- (Australia) Susan Hoevenaars (Ground Jury Member)
- (Canada) Cara Whitham (Technical Delegate)

Jumping

- (Italy) Frances Hesketh-Jones (Ground Jury President)
- (United States) David M. Distler (Ground Jury Member)
- (Germany) Joachim Geilfus (Ground Jury Member)
- (Canada) John Taylor (Ground Jury Member)
- (United States) Neill O'Connor (Ground Jury Member)
- (Venezuela) Leopoldo Palacios (Technical Delegate)

Eventing

- (Denmark) Anne-Mette Binder (Ground Jury President)
- (United States) Jane Hamlin (Ground Jury Member)
- (New Zealand) Andrew Bennie (Ground Jury Member)
- (Germany) Stephan Ellenbruch (Jumping judge)
- (Germany) Martin Plewa (Technical Delegate)

Para-Dressage

- (Netherlands) Hanneke Gerritsen (Ground Jury President)
- (France) Anne Prain (Ground Jury Member)
- (Germany) Marco Orsini (Ground Jury Member)
- (United States) Kristi Wysocki (Ground Jury Member)
- (Australia) Suzanne Cunningham (Ground Jury Member)
- (United Kingdom) Sarah Leitch (Ground Jury Member)
- (Belgium) Marc Urban (Ground Jury Member)
- (Germany) Jan Holger Holtschmidt (Technical Delegate)

== Logistics ==
Horses competing in the championships were flown in and out of Greenville-Spartanburg International Airport in Greer, South Carolina. They were then transported by horse trailers up to Tryon.

== Schedule ==
All times Eastern Daylight Time (UTC−4)

●	Event Competitions	1	Number of Gold Medal Events

September	12 Wed	13 Thu	14 Fri	15 Sat	16 Sun	17 Mon	18 Tue	19 Wed	20 Thu	21 Fri	22 Sat	23 Sun	Gold medal events
Dressage	●	1	1		1								3
Driving										●	●	2	2
Endurance	2												2
Eventing		●	●	●	2								2
Jumping								●	●	1		1	2
Para-dressage							3	2	●	1	5		11
Reining	1	●		1									2
Vaulting							●	1	1		3		5
Total gold medal events	3	1	1	1	3	0	3	3	1	2	8	3	29
Cumulative total	3	4	5	6	9	9	12	15	16	18	26	29	29

=== Ceremonies ===
Event date	Starting time	Event details
11 September	19:30	Opening Ceremony
23 September	17:30	Closing Ceremony

=== Dressage ===
Event date	Starting time	Event details
12 September	08:45	Grand Prix Day 1
13 September	08:45	Grand Prix Day 2
14 September	10:30	Grand Prix Special
16 September	08:30	Grand Prix Freestyle

=== Driving ===
Event date	Starting time	Event details
21 September	11:00	Dressage
22 September	11:00	Marathon
23 September	09:30	Obstacle Cones

=== Endurance ===
Event date	Starting time	Event details
12 September	07:00	Team and Individual Competition

=== Eventing ===
Event date	Starting time	Event details
13 September	09:00	Dressage Day 1
14 September	09:00	Dressage Day 2
15 September	11:00	Cross Country
16 September	15:15	Jumping

=== Jumping ===
Event date	Starting time	Event details
19 September	09:00	Speed Competition
20 September	09:00	Team Competition Day 1
21 September	13:30	Team Competition Day 2
23 September	10:00	Individual Competition

=== Reining ===
Event date	Starting time	Event details
12 September	08:30	Team Competition & 1st Ind. Qual. Round 1
13 September	14:00	2nd Ind. Qual. Competition
15 September	18:00	Individual Final Competition

=== Vaulting ===
Event date	Starting time	Event details
18 September	09:30	Compulsory Competitions (Men's, Women's, Squad)
19 September	09:30	Freestyle Competitions (Men's, Women's), Pas-de-Deux Qual., Team Freestyle Final
20 September	12:00	Freestyle Competition (Squad), Technical Competitions (Men's, Women's), Pas-de-Deux Final
22 September	12:00	Freestyle Finals (Men's, Women's, Squad)

=== Para-Dressage ===
Event date	Starting time	Event details
18 September	08:30	Ind. Champ. Test Grade II, IV & V
19 September	08:30	Ind. Champ. Test Grade I & III
20 September	09:00	Team Test Grade II, IV & V
21 September	09:00	Team Test Grade I & III
22 September	09:30	Ind. Freestyle Test Grade I, II, III, IV & V

== Participating nations ==
68 nations are scheduled to take part.

- Argentina (16)
- Australia (30)
- Austria (23)
- Bahrain (5)
- Belgium (26)
- Bermuda (2)
- Bolivia (2)
- Brazil (32)
- Canada (34)
- Chile (11)
- China (5)
- Colombia (6)
- Costa Rica (3)
- Czech Republic (12)
- Denmark (9)
- Ecuador (6)
- Egypt (4)
- Finland (7)
- France (29)
- (Georgia (country)) Georgia (1)
- Germany (44)
- (United Kingdom) Great Britain (31)
- Guatemala (4)
- Hong Kong (5)
- Hungary (7)
- India (1)
- (Republic of Ireland) Ireland (15)
- Israel (7)
- Italy (33)
- Japan (18)
- Jordan (1)
- Kazakhstan (1)
- Kuwait (2)
- Latvia (1)
- Lebanon (1)
- Luxembourg (1)
- (North Macedonia) Macedonia (1)
- Mexico (14)
- Morocco (2)
- Netherlands (36)
- New Zealand (13)
- Norway (5)
- Oman (4)
- Palestine (1)
- Peru (2)
- Philippines (2)
- Poland (3)
- Portugal (16)
- Qatar (4)
- Romania (2)
- Russia (14)
- Saudi Arabia (5)
- Singapore (2)
- Slovakia (4)
- South Africa (9)
- South Korea (2)
- Spain (17)
- Sri Lanka (1)
- Sweden (17)
- Switzerland (29)
- Chinese Taipei (1)
- Thailand (1)
- Ukraine (1)
- United Arab Emirates (4)
- United States (43)
- Uruguay (7)
- Venezuela (4)
- (United States Virgin Islands) Virgin Islands (1)

== Medal summary ==
=== Dressage ===
Event	Gold	Silver	Bronze
Individual special dressage	Isabell Werth on Bella Rose; Germany	Laura Graves on Verdades; United States	Charlotte Dujardin on Mount St John Freestyle; Great Britain
Individual freestyle dressage	Competition cancelled due to Hurricane Florence		
Team dressage	Germany; Jessica von Bredow-Werndl on TSF Dalera BB; Dorothee Schneider on Sammy Davis Jr. Sönke Rothenberger on Cosmo; Isabell Werth on Bella Rose	United States; Steffen Peters on Suppenkasper; Adrienne Lyle on Salvino; Kasey Perry-Glass on Goerklintgaards Dublet; Laura Graves on Verdades	Great Britain; Spencer Wilton on Super Nova II; Emile Faurie on Dono di Maggio; Carl Hester on Hawtins Delicato; Charlotte Dujardin on Mount St John Freestyle

=== Driving ===
Event	Gold	Silver	Bronze
Individual driving	Boyd Exell; Australia	Chester Weber; United States	Edouard Simonet; Belgium
Team driving	United States; James Fairclough; Misdee Wrigley-Miller; Chester Weber	Netherlands; Bram Chardon; Koos de Ronde; IJsbrand Chardon	Belgium; Dries Degrieck; Glenn Geerts; Edouard Simonet

=== Endurance ===
Event	Gold	Silver	Bronze
Individual endurance	Competition abandoned due to excessive heat and humidity		
Team endurance	Competition abandoned due to excessive heat and humidity		

=== Eventing ===
Event	Gold	Silver	Bronze
Individual eventing	Rosalind Canter on Allstar B Great Britain	Padraig McCarthy on Mr Chunky; Ireland	Ingrid Klimke on SAP Hale Bob OLD; Germany
Team eventing	Great Britain; Rosalind Canter on Allstar B Piggy French on Quarrycrest Echo; Tom McEwen on Toledo de Kerser; Gemma Tattersall on Arctic Soul	Ireland; Padraig McCarthy on Mr Chunky; Sarah Ennis on Horseware Stellor Rebound; Sam Watson on Horseware Ardagh Highlight; Cathal Daniels on Rioghan Rua	France; Thibaut Vallette on Qing du Briot ENE HN; Maxime Livio on Opium de Verrieres; Sidney Dufresne on Tresor Mail; Donatien Schauly on Pivoine des Touches

=== Jumping ===
Event	Gold	Silver	Bronze
Individual jumping	Simone Blum on DSP Alice; Germany	Martin Fuchs on Clooney; Switzerland	Steve Guerdat on Bianca; Switzerland
Team jumping	United States; Devin Ryan on Eddie Blue; Adrienne Sternlicht on Cristalline; Laura Kraut on Zeremonie; McLain Ward on Clinta	Sweden; Henrik von Eckermann on Toveks Mary Lou; Malin Baryard-Johnsson on H&M Indiana; Fredrik Jönsson on Cold Play; Peder Fredricson on H&M Christian K	Germany; Simone Blum on DSP Alice; Laura Klaphake on Catch Me If You Can OLD; Maurice Tebbel on Don Diarado; Marcus Ehning on Pret A Tout

=== Reining ===
Event	Gold	Silver	Bronze
Individual reining	Bernard Fonck on What a Wave; Belgium	Daniel Huss on Miss Dreamy; United States	Cade McCutcheon on Custom Made Gun; United States
Team reining	United States; Casey Deary on Heavy Duty Chex; Cade Mccutcheon on Custom Made Gun; Daniel Huss on Miss Dreamy; Jordan Larson on ARC Gunnabeabigstar	Belgium; Dries Verschueren on Smart'n'Sparkin; Ann Poels on Made In Walla; Cira Baeck on Gunners Snappy Chic; Bernard Fonck on What a Wave	Germany; Grischa Ludwig on Ruf Lil Diamond; Markus Süchting on Spotlight Charly; Robin Schoeller on Wimpy Kaweah; Julia Schumacher on Coeurs Little Tyke

=== Vaulting ===
Event	Gold	Silver	Bronze
Men's individual	Lambert Leclezio on Poivre Vert lunged by François Athimon; France	Jannik Heiland on Dark Beluga lunged by Barbara Rosiny; Germany	Thomas Brüsewitz on Danny Boy OLD lunged by Patric Looser; Germany
Women's individual	Kristina Boe on Don de la Mar lunged by Winnie Schlüter; Germany	Janika Derks on Carousso Hit lunged by Jessica Lichtenberg; Germany	Lisa Wild on Fairytale lunged by Maria Lehrmann; Austria
Squad	Germany; Thomas Brüsewitz; Torben Jacobs; Jana Zelesny; Chiara Congia; Justin van Gerven; Corinna Knauf on Danny Boy OLD lunged by Patric Looser	Switzerland; Nadja Büttiker; Ramona Näf; Elisabeth Bieri; Aline Koller; Kyra Seiler; Samira Koller on Rayo de la Luz lunged by Monika Winkler-Bischofberger	Austria; Lisa Wild; Katharina Luschin; Magdalena Riegler; Barbara Hruza; Nikolaus Luschin; Leonie Poljc on Alessio l'Amabile lunged by Maria Lehrmann
Pas-de-deux	Italy; Lorenzo Lupacchini; Silvia Stopazzini on Rosenstolz lunged by Laura Carnabuci	Austria; Jasmin Lindner; Lukas Wacha on Dr. Doolittle lunged by Klaus Haidacher	Germany; Janika Derks; Johannes Kay on Dark Beluga lunged by Barbara Rosiny
Team	Germany; Kristina Boe (i) on Don de la Mar lunged by Winnie Schlüter; Jannik Heiland (i) on Dark Beluga lunged by Barbara Rosiny; Thomas Brüsewitz (s); Torben Jacobs (s); Jana Zelesny (s); Chiara Congia (s); Justin van Gerven (s); Corinna Knauf (s) on Danny Boy OLD lunged by Patric Looser	Switzerland; Nadja Büttiker (i) on Acardi van de Kapel lunged by Monika Winkler-Bischofberger; Lukas Heppler (i) on Acardi van de Kapel lunged by Monika Winkler-Bischofberger; Nadja Büttiker (s); Ramona Näf (s); Elisabeth Bieri (s); Aline Koller (s); Kyra Seiler (s); Samira Koller (s) on Rayo de la Luz lunged by Monika Winkler-Bischofberger	Austria; Katharina Luschin (i) on Fairytale lunged by Maria Lehrmann; Lisa Wild (i) on Fairytale lunged by Maria Lehrmann; Lisa Wild (s); Katharina Luschin (s); Magdalena Riegler (s); Barbara Hruza (s); Nikolaus Luschin (s); Leonie Poljc (s) on Alessio l'Amabile lunged by Maria Lehrmann

(i) - individual, (s) - squad

=== Para-dressage ===
Event	Gold	Silver	Bronze
Individual championship grade I	Sara Morganti on Royal Delight; Italy	Laurentia Tan on Fuerst Sherlock; Singapore	Elke Philipp on Fuerst Sinclair; Germany
Individual championship grade II	Stinna Kaastrup on Horsebo Smarties; Denmark	Pepo Puch on Sailor's Blue; Austria	Nicole den Dulk on Wallace N.O.P. Netherlands
Individual championship grade III	Rixt van der Horst on Findsley; Netherlands	Natasha Baker on Mount St John Diva Dannebrog; Great Britain	Rebecca Hart on El Corona Texel; United States
Individual championship grade IV	Sanne Voets on Dematur N.O.P. Netherlands	Rodolpho Riskalla on Don Henrico; Brazil	Susanne Sunesen on CSK's Que Faire; Denmark
Individual championship grade V	Sophie Wells on C Fatal Attraction; Great Britain	Frank Hosmar on Alphaville N.O.P. Netherlands	Regine Mispelkamp on Look At Me Now; Germany
Individual freestyle grade I	Sara Morganti on Royal Delight; Italy	Rihards Snikus on King of the Dance; Latvia	Roxanne Trunnell on Dolton; United States
Individual freestyle grade II	Stinna Kaastrup on Horsebo Smarties; Denmark	Pepo Puch on Sailor's Blue; Austria	Nicole den Dulk on Wallace N.O.P. Netherlands
Individual freestyle grade III	Rixt van der Horst on Findsley; Netherlands	Rebecca Hart on El Corona Texel; United States	Dr. Angelika Trabert on Diamond's Shine; Germany
Individual freestyle grade IV	Sanne Voets on Dematur N.O.P. Netherlands	Rodolpho Riskalla on Don Henrico; Brazil	Kate Shoemaker on Solitaer; United States
Individual freestyle grade V	Sophie Wells on C Fatal Attraction; Great Britain	Frank Hosmar on Alphaville N.O.P. Netherlands	Tomoko Nakamura on Djazz F Japan
Team para-dressage	Netherlands; Frank Hosmar on Alphaville N.O.P. Nicole den Dulk on Wallace N.O.P. Sanne Voets on Demantur N.O.P. Rixt van der Horst on Findsley	Great Britain; Sophie Wells on C Fatal Attraction; Lee Pearson on Styletta; Natasha Baker on Mount St John Diva Dannebrog; Erin Orford on Dior	Germany; Regine Mispelkamp on Look At Me Now; Dr. Angelika Trabert on Diamond's Shine; Steffen Zeibig on Feel Good; Elke Philipp on Fuerst Sinclair

== Medal table ==
* Host nation (United States)

Rank	Nation	Gold	Silver	Bronze	Total
1	Germany (GER)	6	2	9	17
2	Netherlands (NED)	5	3	2	10
3	Great Britain (GBR)	4	2	2	8
4	United States (USA)*	3	5	4	12
5	Italy (ITA)	3	0	0	3
6	Denmark (DEN)	2	0	1	3
7	Belgium (BEL)	1	1	2	4
8	France (FRA)	1	0	1	2
9	Australia (AUS)	1	0	0	1
10	Austria (AUT)	0	3	3	6
11	Switzerland (SUI)	0	3	1	4
12	Brazil (BRA)	0	2	0	2
12	Ireland (IRL)	0	2	0	2
14	Latvia (LAT)	0	1	0	1
14	Singapore (SGP)	0	1	0	1
14	Sweden (SWE)	0	1	0	1
17	Japan (JPN)	0	0	1	1
Totals (17 entries)		26	26	26	78

== Hurricane Florence ==
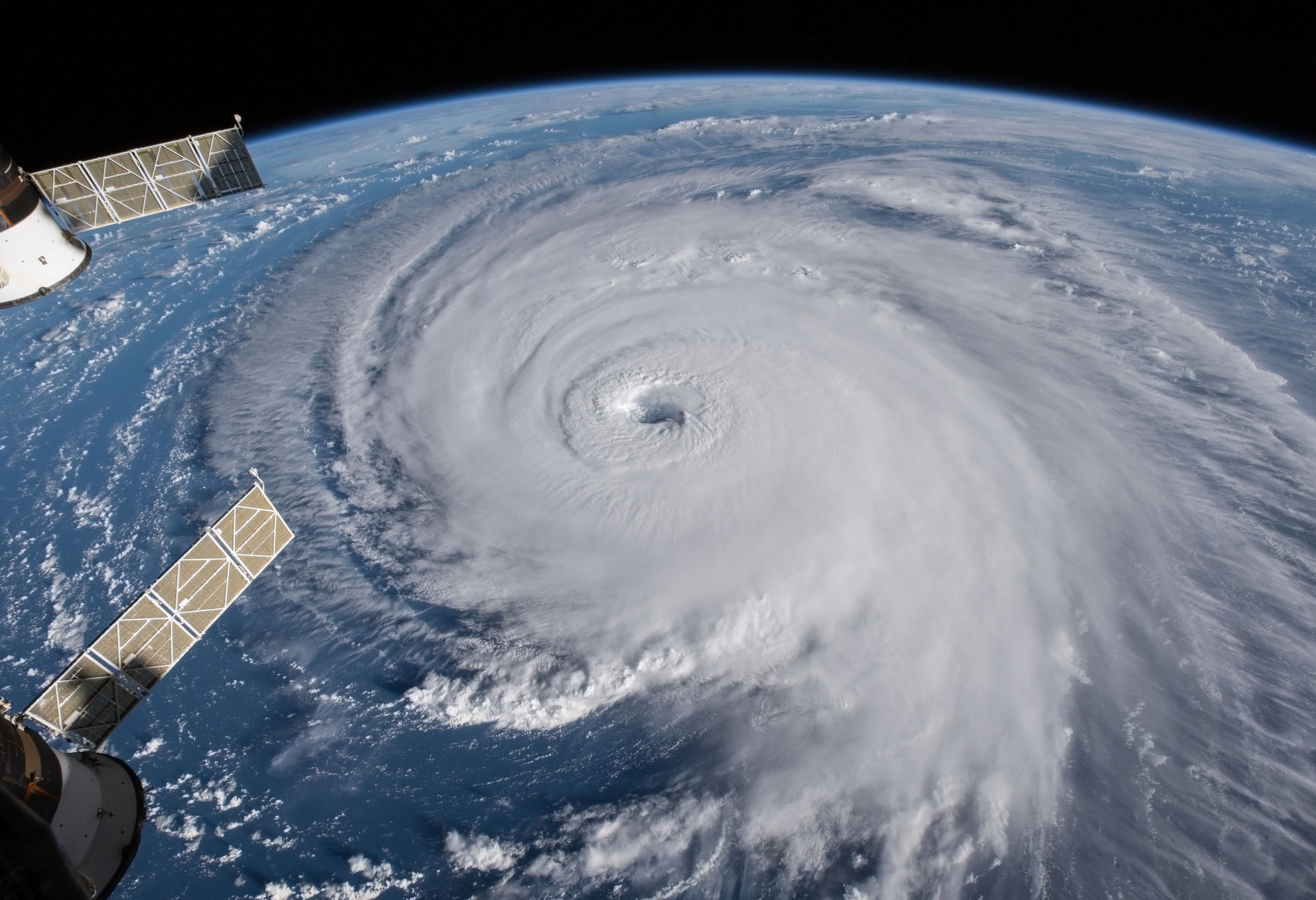
Hurricane Florence as seen from the International Space Station on September 12

Hurricane Florence hit the Tryon International Equestrian Center and the surrounding area during the first week of the World Equestrian Games. Reported impacts included heavy rainfall and increased gusts of wind. A special contingency plan has been addressed for the situation.

The contingency plan included accommodating all horses on-venue in permanent barns, moving grooms accommodated on-site to permanent buildings at the venue, advising shelter locations for all personnel, continuing discussions with airports and the airline Emirates on any necessary steps regarding horse arrivals/departures, ensuring smaller tents in the vendor area are tie-strapped together for security, carrying out additional drainage/water channeling to prevent flooding, purchasing additional fuel tanks and filling all fuel tanks to run the generators, preparing to remove fence scrim already installed and taking down flags.

== WEQx Games ==
Alongside the World Equestrian Games, Tryon International Equestrian Center was supposed to host the inaugural WEQx Games. WEQx Games were scheduled to feature nine spectator-friendly equine competitions that should "highlight the accessibility, diversity, athleticism, and passion for horses and horse sport for athletes of all ages".

WEQx Events:

- U-25 U.S. Open Championship (Jumping)
- U.S. Open Speed Horse (Jumping)
- DerbyX (Hunter Derby)
- Battle of the Sexes (Jumping)
- Match Race (Jumping)
- Puissance (Jumping)
- Six Bar (Jumping)
- Pony Jumpers (Jumping)
- Gladiator Polo (3x3 Polo)

The program got cancelled amidst Hurricane Florence and various organizational setbacks (delayed construction of venues, budget cuts, low ticket sales).
