= Bernard Fonck =

Belgian equestrian

Personal information
- Born: 20 May 1973 (age 53)
Medal record
Equestrian
Representing Belgium
World Championships
Gold medal – first place	2018 Tryon	Individual reining
Silver medal – second place	2010 Kentucky	Team reining
Silver medal – second place	2014 Normandy	Team reining
Silver medal – second place	2018 Tryon	Team reining

Bernard Fonck (born 20 May 1973) is a Belgian equestrian specializing in reining. He won silver as part of the Belgian team at the 2010 FEI World Equestrian Games and the 2014 FEI World Equestrian Games in the team reining event, and became the second non-American to win gold at the individual reining event at the 2018 FEI World Equestrian Games, and another silver in the team event.

He is married to Ann Poels who also won silver in the team event on all three occasions.
