= Cortes 'C' =

Show jumping horse

- Breed: Belgian Warmblood
- Discipline: Show jumping
- Sex: Gelding
- Foaled: April 24, 2002; Bellegem, Belgium
- Died: July 13, 2023 (aged 21)
- Country: United States
- Color: Black

Cortes 'C', or Cortes, (April 24, 2002 – July 13, 2023) was a horse ridden by four-time U.S. Olympian Beezie Madden in show jumping. He was owned by Abigail Wexner. The pair have won many competitions and have competed in the Olympics together, including being named the 2014 United States Equestrian Federation (USEF) International Horse of the Year.

== Life and career ==
Cortes is a 2002 gelding sired by Randel Z, out of Orchidee Van De Tombeele. His cross-legged jumping style has caught the attention of many. His longtime groom, Clark Shipley says, “He’s the friendliest horse you’ll ever meet in your life.”

He splits his time between Authentic Stables in Wellington, FL, and John Madden Sales in Cazenovia, New York when he is not showing.

== Accomplishments ==
In 2013, Cortes and Madden rode to first place in the $125,000 FEI World Cup Grand Prix at the FTI Consulting Winter Equestrian Festival in Wellington, Florida. They also won the Global Champions Tour CSI5* Grand Prix of Chantilly in France. In 2014, Madden and Cortes won the King George Gold Cup at Hickstead—making Madden the first woman to take first place. Madden also won a team bronze and individual bronze at the World Equestrian Games with Cortes in 2014. In 2016, Madden and Cortes were named a part of the U.S. Olympic show jumping team to compete in Rio de Janeiro, Brazil. The pair have been traveling with the team in preparation for the Olympics, most notably tying with France for Silver in the Furusiyya FEI Nations Cup presented by Longines in Italy.

== Retirement ==
In 2017, it was announced by rider Beezie Madden that Cortes 'C' would be retired from competition.
