= Éric Navet =

French equestrian

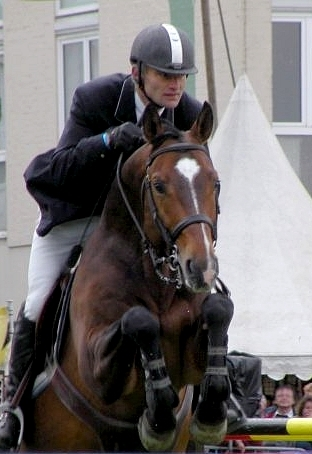

Medal record

Equestrian

Representing France

Olympic Games
Bronze medal – third place	1992 Barcelona	Team jumping

World Championships
Gold medal – first place	1990 Stockholm	Individual jumping
Gold medal – first place	1990 Stockholm	Team jumping
Gold medal – first place	2002 Jerez	Team jumping
Silver medal – second place	1994 The Hague	Team jumping
Silver medal – second place	1998 Rome	Team jumping
Silver medal – second place	2002 Jerez	Individual jumping

Éric Navet (born 9 May 1959) is a French equestrian and Olympic medalist. He was born in Bayeux. He won a bronze medal in show jumping at the 1992 Summer Olympics in Barcelona.

He was selected to represent France, in 1990 at the world championships in Stockholm with his young stallion of 8 years old Quito de Baussy, bred by his father at their Haras the Baussy farm in Normandy, and won there both the gold individual and team medals

Navet lives in southern California, where he trains World Cup rider Karl Cook, and continues to compete at the national and FEI levels.
