= Grand Slam =

Grand Slam or Grand slam may refer to:

== Games and sports ==
- Grand slam, winning category terminology originating in contract bridge and other whist card games

=== Athletics ===
- Grand Slam Track, professional track and field league

=== Auto racing ===
- Grand Slam (Formula One), winning from pole position, leading every lap, and setting the fastest lap in a Grand Prix
- Grand Slam (NASCAR), winning all NASCAR Cup Series majors in a calendar year

=== Brazilian jiu-jitsu ===
- IBJJF Grand Slam, achievement of winning all four major championships

=== Baseball ===
- Grand slam (baseball), a home run with all bases occupied
- Grand Slam Single (October 17, 1999), the hit that ended Game 5 of the 1999 National League Championship Series between the New York Mets and Atlanta Braves, at Shea Stadium

=== Basketball ===
- Grand Slam (PBA), one team winning all three major Philippine Basketball Association tournaments in one season

=== Equestrian ===
- Grand Slam (horse), an American thoroughbred
- Equestrian Grand Slam, any of several events
  - Grand Slam of Eventing, three particular world horse trials competitions
  - Grand Slam of Show Jumping, one rider winning all three major annual competitions consecutively
- Grand Slam of Thoroughbred racing, the US Triple Crown of Thoroughbred Racing plus either the Travers Stakes or the Breeders' Cup Classic

=== Golf ===
- Grand Slam (golf), one player winning all four major annual tournaments
- PGA Grand Slam of Golf, an annual off-season men's competition

=== Judo ===
- Grand Slam series, international judo tournaments held by the International Judo Federation

=== Tennis ===
- Grand Slam (tennis), one player or pair winning all four major annual tournaments in a calendar year, or the tournaments themselves
- Pepsi Grand Slam, an annual men's professional tournament
- Grand Slam Cup, an annual international tournament
- Grand Slam (real tennis), a player or pair winning all four major annual real tennis tournaments

=== Wrestling ===
- AEW Grand Slam, an All Elite Wrestling event
- Wrestle Grand Slam in Tokyo Dome, a 2021 New Japan Pro-Wrestling event
- Grand Slam (professional wrestling), an accomplishment after winning all professional wrestling championships in a company.

=== Other games and sports ===
- Explorers Grand Slam or Adventurers Grand Slam, one person reaching the North Pole, South Pole, and all Seven Summits during a career
- Ocean Explorers Grand Slam, performing open-water crossing on each of the five oceans using human-powered vessel
- Grand Slam of Curling, a series of annual curling bonspiels
- Grand Slam of Darts, a major professional darts tournament organised by the Professional Darts Corporation
- Grand Slam of Ultrarunning, for a person finishing four annual 100-mile footraces in the U.S.
- Grand Slam (figure skating), winning all three major annual senior-level international competitions within a single season
- Grand Slam (rugby union), one national team defeating all others in the Six Nations Championship
- Grand Slam (shinty), one club winning four annual shinty trophies
- Grand slam, in roller derby, a five-point scoring pass
- Grand Slam of Keirin, for a cyclist to win all six GI events (or four for women)
- Grand slam, in ski jumping, winning all four events in the same edition of Four Hills Tournament
- Grand slam, in contract bridge, a contract to win all thirteen tricks in one deal
- S2 6.7 Grand Slam, an American racing sailboat design

== Entertainment, arts and media ==
- Grand Slam (G.I. Joe), a character
- Grand Slam of Hollywood show business, winning Emmy, Grammy, Oscar, and Tony Awards in an American entertainment career (see List of people who have won Academy, Emmy, Grammy, and Tony Awards)
- Grand Slam of Philippine film industry, winning category awards from four major film award-giving bodies in a year (see List of people who won the Philippine movie grand slam)

=== Films ===
- Grand Slam (1933 film), an American comedy
- Grand Slam (1967 film), an Italian heist movie
- Grand Slam (1978 film), a Welsh TV comedy

=== Music ===
- Grand Slam (band), a band formed by Phil Lynott
- Grand Slam, a lineup of Juice Leskinen

==== Albums ====
- Grand Slam (The Isley Brothers album)
- Grand Slam (Magic Slim album)
- Grand Slam (Spiderbait album)
- Grand Slam (Spinners album)

=== Television ===
- 50 Grand Slam, a 1976 American game show
- Grand Slam (BBC TV), 1980s televised contract bridge tournaments
- Grand Slam (TV series), a 1990 American action drama
- Grand Slam (British game show), 2003
  - Grand Slam (American game show), a 2007 American remake

=== Video games ===
- Golf Grand Slam (video game), for the Nintendo NES
- Grand Slam Chess Association, a series of annual chess tournaments
- Grand Slam Tennis, a 2009 game for the Nintendo Wii
- Grand Slam (video game), a 1997 baseball game
- Grandslam Entertainment, a video game company
- Bilbao Chess Masters Final or Grand Slam Masters Final, a culminating annual chess tournament

== Military ==
- Grand Slam (bomb), a 10-tonne British "earthquake bomb" of World War II
- Exercise Grand Slam, a 1952 NATO naval exercise in the Mediterranean Sea
- Grand Slam Installation, a modification of the B-36 bomber to add nuclear weapons delivery capability
- Operation Grand Slam, a Pakistan Army offensive plan during the Indo-Pakistani War of 1965
- Operation Grand Slam, the US espionage mission which triggered the 1960 U-2 incident

== Other uses ==
- Grand Slam breakfast, a dish at Denny's restaurants

== See also ==
- Operation Grand Slam (disambiguation)
- Slam (disambiguation)
