= Cantley Hall =

Mansion in South Yorkshire, England

Coordinates: 53.5122°N 1.0591°W

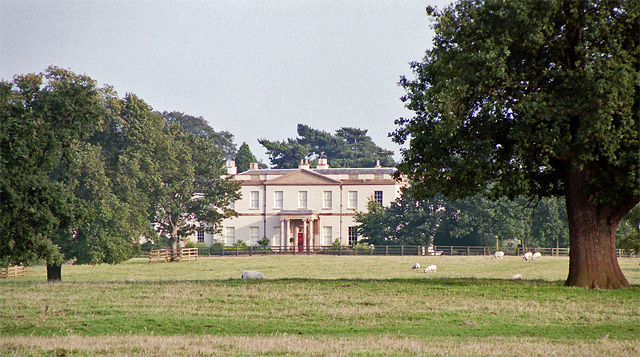
Cantley hall

Cantley Hall is a grade II* listed Georgian mansion set in 400 acres (160 ha), in the village of Old Cantley in Doncaster, South Yorkshire, England.

It is constructed in two storeys of stuccoed brick with a graduated Westmorland slate roof.

== Early history ==
Cantley Hall was probably a home from around the 7th or 8th century, owned by a Saxon called Tochi prior to the conquest of England by the Normans in 1066, after which it probably went to the Everingham's or Everingham Ancestors. By 1209 it was known as Kanteleia, and Cauntele in 1246. By 1280 it was in the possession of Robert de Everingham. By the late 15th century the name of Cantley had been established and remained, while the residents of the estate were the Smith family.

== Childers family ==
In 1610, Hugh Childers the Mayor of Doncaster from 1604, added Cantley Lodge to the existing family's traditional home at Carr House, Warmsworth, Doncaster by buying the Cantley estate from the Stapleton family. In 1714 Leonard Childers of Cantley Lodge bred the famous stallion "Flying Childers", son of "Darley Arabian". "Flying Childers" was later sold to the Duke of Devonshire, was never beaten and is still regarded as one of the fastest horses ever raced. He later retired to Chatsworth House, Derbyshire although he mainly covered mares owned by the Duke, as he was too far away from the main breeding centre of Yorkshire.

Leonard's successors after his death in 1748 were his daughter Mildred Childers, who had married William Walbanke, and then their son Childers, who probably moved from Carr House to Cantley later in the century and who added the surname Childers to his own on inheriting. Between 1785 and 1786, Childers Walbank Childers considerably remodelled Cantley Lodge into an impressive country mansion and created the shooting forest Black Carr Plantation.

Colonel John Walbanke-Childers (died 1812), son of Childers Walbanke-Childers, sold Carr House and made further improvements to Cantley, renaming it Cantley Hall. His son, another John (1798–1886), was MP for Malton from 1836 to 1846 and from 1847 to 1852 and a JP and Deputy Lieutenant for the West Riding. By the mid-19th century, he owned 5,700 acres (23 km^{2}) in the West Riding (i.e. Cantley Hall estate), 7,400 in Cambridgeshire and 200 in Lincolnshire. He served as High Sheriff of Yorkshire for 1858–59 and in 1893 his wife, a staunch Anglo-Catholic, was patron for the refurbishment of Cantley Church by Sir John Ninian Comper. For most of his life he leased the hall to various tenants. His only grandchild Rowlanda Frances Childers continued the tradition before finally selling the property in 1901 to Grassmoor Collieries.

== After 1901 ==
In 1904 Cantley Hall and its residual 5,000 acres (2,000 ha) was bought by the William Wentworth-Fitzwilliam, 7th Earl Fitzwilliam.

After World War II, the Fitzwilliam family faced with quickly declining revenues from their land, started selling off parts of the estate, including Black Carr Plantation in 1950 to Oates Brothers Timber Merchants. The house itself was acquired by brewer Thomas Darley, who died in 1982 and whose wife died in 1987. A sale of contents was held and the house sold to car magnate John Carnell in 1989.

In 1990, Carnell sold Cantley Hall to Graham Kirkham, later Baron Kirkham of Old Cantley, founder and chairman of sofa retailer DFS.

== See also ==
- Grade II* listed buildings in South Yorkshire
- Listed buildings in Cantley, South Yorkshire
