= Hello Sanctos =

Show jumping horse

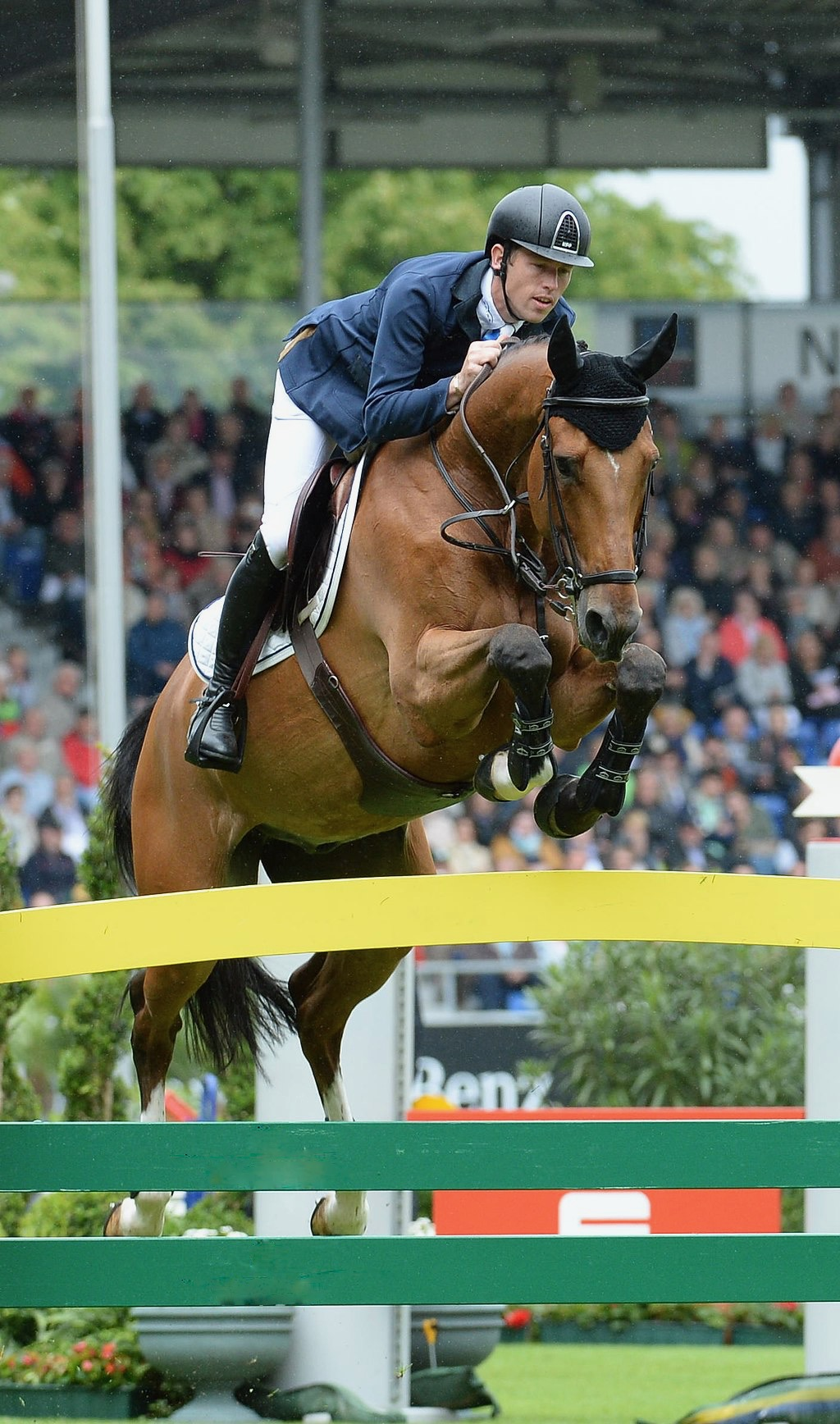
- Hello Sanctos at CHIO Aachen, 2015.
- Sex: Gelding
- Foaled: 2002
- Country: Belgium
- Colour: Bay

Hello Sanctos (born Sanctos Van Het Gravenhof, 13 May 2002) is a bay gelding. He is listed in stud-book sBs and ridden in show jumping. From 2014 to 2015, he was the best show jumping horse in the world. His rider was Scott Brash. He is the only horse in the world to complete a Grand Slam of Show Jumping. He stopped due to an injury in December 2015. The horse returned in February 2017.

He was born on 13 May 2002 at Willy Taets stud, Lembeke, Belgium, and named Sanctos van het Gravenhof. Peter Wylde was the first to ride him. After a year, Sanctos was exported to Ukraine for Katharina Offel. Hello Sanctos was noticed by Lord Kirkham and Lord Harris who bought him for Scott Brash to ride in the London Olympic Games of 2012.
