= Cantley, South Yorkshire =

Village and civil parish in South Yorkshire, England

Coordinates: 53.51°N 1.06°W

Cantley
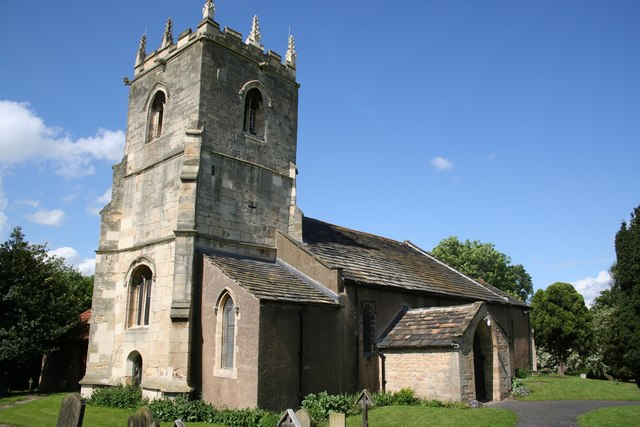
- St Wilfrid's Church

- Location within South Yorkshire
- Population: 2,817 (2011 census)
- Civil parish: Cantley
- Metropolitan borough: Doncaster
- Metropolitan county: South Yorkshire
- Region: Yorkshire and the Humber
- Country: England
- Sovereign state: United Kingdom
- Post town: DONCASTER
- Postcode district: DN3, DN4
- Dialling code: 01302
- Police: South Yorkshire
- Fire: South Yorkshire
- Ambulance: Yorkshire
- UK Parliament: Doncaster Central

Cantley is a village and civil parish in the City of Doncaster in South Yorkshire, England. The village is adjacent to Bessacarr, separated by Bawtry Road. It has a population of 2,830, reducing slightly to 2,817 at the 2011 Census.

== Etymology ==
The second part of the name is the Old English –lēah meaning "a clearing, pasture, meadow". This is suffixed either to Canta-, an unrecorded but plausible Old English hypocorism, or the Brittonic cant meaning "a circumference, a boundary" and "a division, share of land" (Welsh cant).

== Early history ==
Cantley Hall was probably a home from around the 7th or 8th century, owned by a Saxon called Tochi prior to the conquest of England by the Normans in 1066, after which it probably went to the Everingham's or Everingham Ancestors. By 1209 it was known as Kanteleia, and Cauntele in 1246. By 1280 it was in the possession of Robert de Everingham. The Everingham name lives on to this day in Everingham Road, one of the main roads through Cantley. By the late 15th century the name of Cantley had been established and remained, while the residents of the estate were the Smith family.

== Today ==
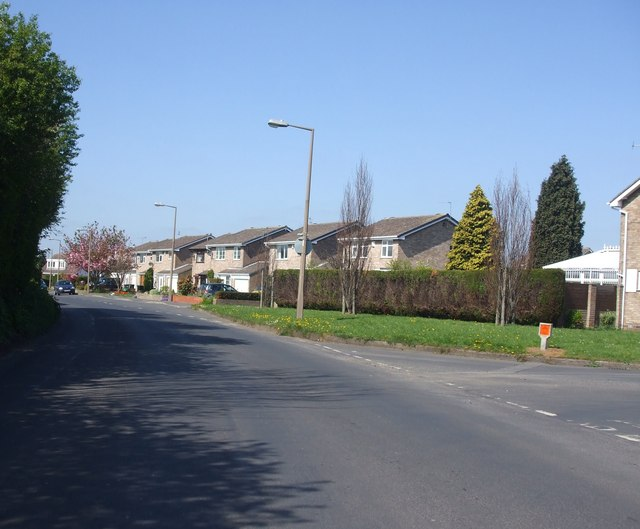
Whiphill Top Lane

Most of Cantley was built after the Second World War, with many of its houses 1950s built semi-detached or small terraces. It mainly consists of housing estates, some council estates, plus a large park and areas of woodland. There are two main sets of shops - Everingham Road has a local convenience store, post office, bakers, grocers, butchers, hairdressers, DIY, and the popular "Fish Dish" fish & chip shop. St Wilfrid's shops are near the local health centre and have several convenience stores, off licences, hairdresser's and a Chinese takeaway. The Cantley Library is situated at St Wilfrid's. There is also a Co-Op on Goodison Boulevard, and two petrol stations. A secondary school, The McAuley Catholic High School, is situated across two campuses towards Old Cantley, and primary schools include Hatchell Wood (previously South Cantley Middle School), and Hawthorn Primary School

There were three pubs in Cantley, one near the park ("Bechers Brook", named for the Grand National fence), another at Everingham Road shops ("The Palfreys Lodge") and a third ("The Paddock") at Cantley Lane roundabout. ("The Paddock") closed and was converted into a My Local convenience store, eventually closed when My Local collapsed in June 2016. The pub names were all linked to horse racing - The Palfreys Lodge was originally called "The Two Palfrey's".

The street names in Cantley have links to each other in groups. Examples are streets named after trees e.g. Lilac Grove, Pine Road, Willow Avenue. Another linked group are football grounds e.g. Ninian Grove, Anfield Road, Ewood Drive, Hillsborough Road. Race courses are another group of street names e.g., Ascot Avenue, Newmarket Road, York Gardens, and Epsom Road.

Cantley has two large landmarks in the form of two water towers. These can be seen from almost any high ground around the Doncaster district.

Cantley has good transport links into Doncaster with a regular bus service from First South Yorkshire route 57, which is now extended for certain journeys to take in the old 91 route to Finningley. Previously First routes 57, 59 and 91 served the village, and before that Leon services 89 and 191. Because of the bus connection, it is a popular retirement village for many people.

== Old Cantley ==
The village of Old Cantley, around half a mile in the Armthorpe direction, is built around the Grade II listed Georgian manor house Cantley Hall, presently owned by Graham Kirkham, Baron Kirkham of Old Cantley the founder and chairman of sofa retailer Dfs.

== See also ==
- Listed buildings in Cantley, South Yorkshire
- St Wilfrid's Church, Cantley
