= Richard Vogel =

Richard Vogel may refer to:

- Richard Vogel (tennis)
- Richard Vogel (equestrian)
