= Listed buildings in Doncaster (Bessacarr Ward) =

Bessacarr is a ward in the metropolitan borough of Doncaster, South Yorkshire, England. The ward contains three listed buildings that are recorded in the National Heritage List for England. Of these, one is listed at Grade II*, the middle of the three grades, and the others are at Grade II, the lowest grade. The ward is to the southeast of the centre of Doncaster and is mostly residential. The listed buildings are a church with medieval origins, a 20th-century house, and a leisure centre.

== Key ==
Grade	Criteria
II*	Particularly important buildings of more than special interest
II	Buildings of national importance and special interest

== Buildings ==
Name and location	Photograph	Date	Notes	Grade
St Wilfrid's Church; 53.50605°N 1.06895°W		Early 13th century	The church was altered and extended through the centuries, it was restored in 1874 by George Gilbert Scott, and further restored in 1892–94 by Ninian Comper, who also added the north aisle. The church is in stone, the body of the church is rendered, and the roof is in stone slate. The church consists of a nave with aisles, a south porch, a chancel, and a west tower with a south vestry. The tower has three stages, diagonal buttresses, and a west doorway with a four-centred arch. At the top are corner and central gargoyles, and an embattled parapet with corner and central pinnacles.	II*
3A Ellers Road; 53.50912°N 1.08979°W	—	1967–68	A house designed by Peter Adlington with walls of concrete blockwork, a felted flat roof, a single storey, and a U-shaped plan. The aluminium-framed windows look into internal courtyards or into the south garden.	II
The Dome; 53.51557°N 1.09942°W		1986–89	The leisure centre has a steel frame, and the exterior is in polished concrete. Its internal areas include a semicircular leisure pools area, a semicircular ice rink, an events sports hall and a gym hall, a cycling studio, a dance studio, squash courts, a fitness room, bars and snack bars.	II
