= Dome Leisure Centre =

Sports venue in Doncaster, South Yorkshire, England

Coordinates: 53.515442°N 1.099003°W

- The Dome; Doncaster Dome
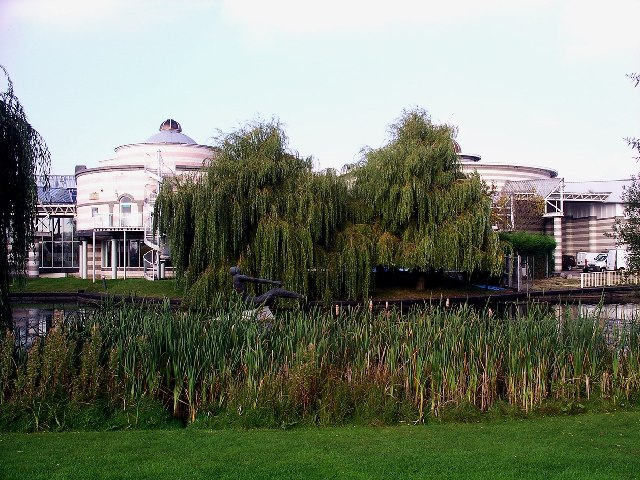
- Interactive map of Dome Leisure Centre
- Location: The Dome; Doncaster Leisure Park; Bawtry Road; Doncaster; DN4 7PD; England
- Owner: Doncaster Metropolitan Borough Council
- Operator: Doncaster Culture & Leisure Trust
- Capacity: 1,000 – 2,100

Construction
- Opened: 26 November 1989
- Cost: £26 million
- Architect: Faulkner Brown

Tenant
- Doncaster Panthers (?–?)

Listed Building – Grade II
- Official name: The Dome
- Designated: 25 October 2023
- Reference no.: 1485053

The Dome Leisure Centre is an arena and leisure centre in Doncaster, England, commonly referred to as The Dome or Doncaster Dome. It has a swimming complex, bars, a sports arena that is also used as an event venue and the United Kingdom's first ever split level ice skating rink.

== Background ==
The Dome as a concept was first conceived in 1985, by Doncaster Metropolitan Borough Council under the Standardised Approach to Sports Halls (SASH) programme. The aim of the project was to inject capital and confidence into the community of Doncaster. The Dome was to act as a catalyst for the economic and qualitative regeneration of Doncaster – at a time when the economic climate of Doncaster was depressed, the Dome was to herald a new age.

== Construction ==
The building was designed by architect Faulkner Brown, and work was underway by November 1986, taking a little under three years for completion with the building officially being declared 'finished' in August 1989. The building was officially opened by Diana, Princess of Wales on 26 November 1989. In total, the project cost £26 million. It was designated as a Grade II listed building on 25 October 2023.

== Facilities ==
- The Lagoons comprises seven free form interlinked pools with a children's area and flume water rides. It hosts many activities, including parties and young children's swimming lessons. In 2002, two new rides were introduced, 'The Anaconda' and 'Alligator Attack'. In January 2005 a new feature was unveiled - 'The Amazonian Falls', a double chamber speed slide. Other features include two whirlpool spas, eighteen 'Water Bubble Beds', two artificial geysers, four water cannons, three massage channels, four water gargoyles and a mushroom drench shower.
- The Ice Caps is The Dome's split level ice skating rink, featuring two ramps, two mini-rinks on different levels and 1.5 square kilometres of ice.
- Fitness Village is the largest fitness facility in the North of England, and contains over 180 pieces of gym equipment, including weights, and the latest state of art Life Fitness equipment.
- The Hall is where a major part of The Dome's events take place. It houses three five-a-side football pitches, as well as twelve badminton courts on the same floor. It also has tiered seating that is kept tidied away near one wall of the Hall. The Sports Hall, as it was then known, was formerly the home venue of the Doncaster Panthers men's basketball team. On 12 May 2005 and 20 April 2006, it played host to the Premier League Darts. Aside from sporting events, The Hall also hosts concerts, with artists that have appeared there including Judas Priest, Kings of Leon, The Strokes, Feeder, Embrace, Travis, Ian Brown, Morrissey, The 1975 and Catfish And The Bottlemen. The Steve Harley and Cockney Rebel concert at the venue in June 1990 was the debut of Robbie Gladwell and Nick Pynn, and Gladwell continues to play lead guitar in the band as of 2021. Harley played the venue again in November 2015, along with the surviving musicians from The Best Years of Our Lives album, rather than the normal 6-piece band.

== Past events ==
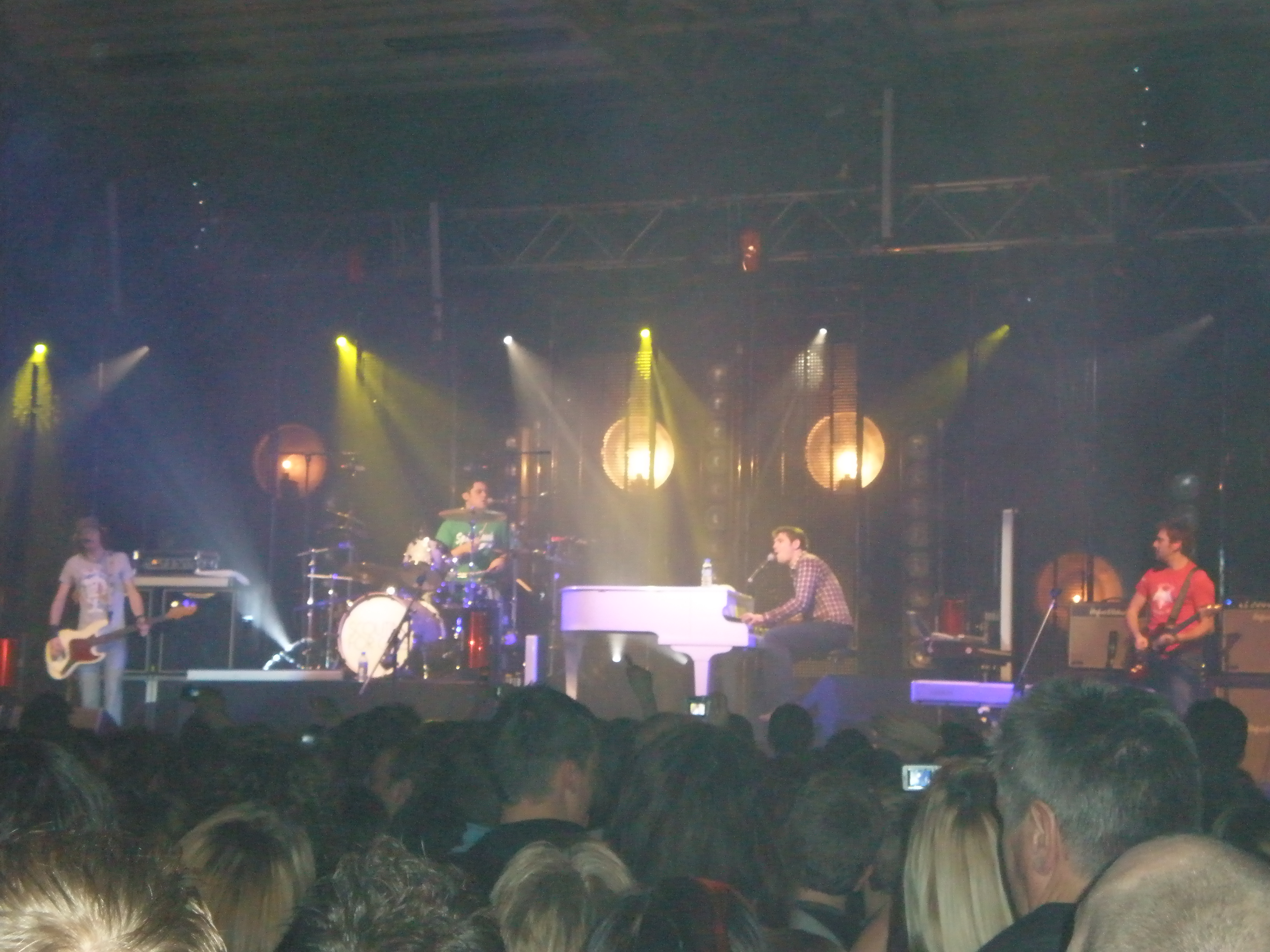
Scouting for Girls plays at the Dome 2008.

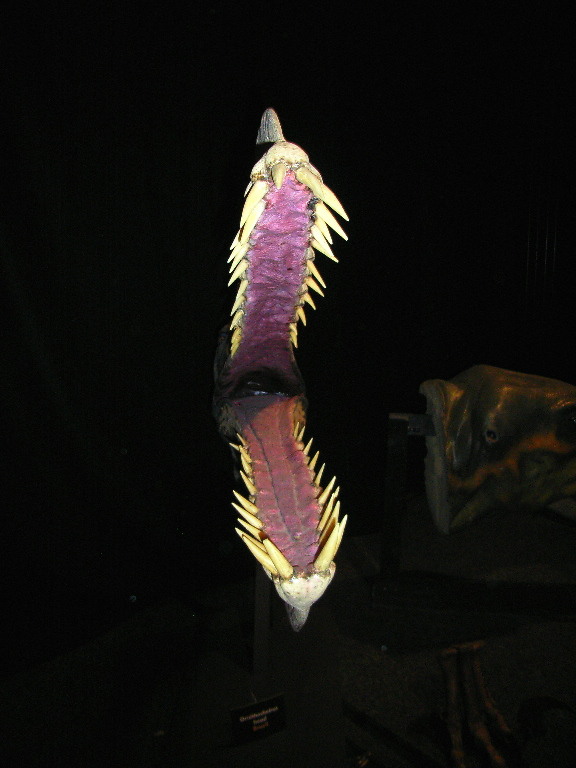
Dinosaur exhibition at the Dome, March 2009.

== See also ==
- Listed buildings in Doncaster (Bessacarr Ward)
