= St Wilfrid's Church, Cantley =

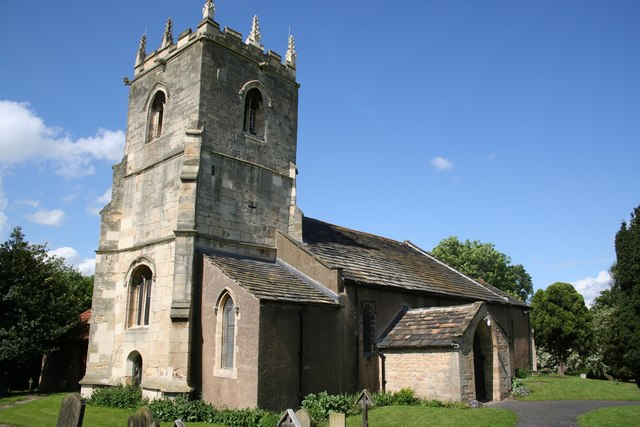
- St Wilfrid's Church, Cantley

- Location within South Yorkshire
- 53°30′20.4″N 1°4′10.89″W
- OS grid reference: SE 61850 01439
- Location: Cantley, South Yorkshire
- Country: England
- Denomination: Church of England
- Churchmanship: Anglo-Catholicism
- Website: St Wilfrid's Church

History
- Dedication: St Wilfrid

Architecture
- Heritage designation: Grade II* listed

Administration
- Province: York
- Diocese: Sheffield
- Archdeaconry: Doncaster
- Deanery: Doncaster
- Parish: Cantley

Clergy
- Bishop: Rt Revd Stephen Race SSC (AEO)
- Vicar: Fr Andrew Howard SSC

St Wilfrid's Cantley is a Grade II* listed church in Doncaster in South Yorkshire, England, and serves as the parish church for the areas of Cantley, Bessacarr and Branton. It is a traditionalist Anglo-Catholic church within the Church of England.

== History ==
The church dates from 1257, though substantial changes have been made since that time. The west tower was added during the fourteenth century. Two significant restorations took place in the late nineteenth century during the tenures of the Reverend William Eardley (1870–1892) and Father William Meaburn Tatham (1892–1938). The first was overseen by George Gilbert Scott in 1874, and the second by the eminent ecclesiastical architect Sir Ninian Comper in 1894. The work of these two architects restored the medieval interior of the church which had been lost in the period following the English Reformation. The result is Comper's finest and most complete work in the region, comprising a free standing altarpiece and reredos, canopy, hanging pyx, various statues and stained glass windows. A large and highly decorated rood screen and rood are also the work of Comper.

In 1989, owing to the increasing size of the congregation, an extension was built on the north side of the church building, almost doubling it in size.

== William Meaburn Tatham ==
Tatham was Vicar of Cantley for 46 years from 1892 until his death on 18 October 1938. Born on 30 July 1862 in Great Ryburgh into a wealthy Norfolk family closely associated with the Catholic Revival in the Church of England, Tatham was educated at Marlborough College and Brasenose College, Oxford. A keen sportsman throughout his life, Tatham competed at the Wimbledon Championships of 1882, being defeated in the first round by the celebrated champion, Ernest Renshaw. After attending theological college at Cuddesdon, Oxford, he was ordained deacon in 1885 at the age of 23 and served his title in the parish of St Saviour's Church, Folkestone working among the poor. Tatham began his second curacy at St Agnes, Kennington Park in 1890, before leaving two years later to be presented to the living of Cantley in the then Diocese of York, later Sheffield, on 14 December 1892. Having been influenced by the Oxford Movement as an undergraduate, Tatham established St Wilfrid's firmly in the Catholic tradition, facing much opposition and courting the displeasure of his diocesan bishops, none of whom ever consented to visit the parish during his incumbency.

During the Boer War (1899–1902) Tatham served as an Army chaplain. He was married on 14 January 1886 to Miss Louisa Valetta Buller at St Matthias, Earl's Court by the Bishop of Lincoln and prominent Anglo-Catholic, Edward King. Mrs Tatham outlived her husband by six months.

== Present day ==
Since the time of Tatham St Wilfrid's has been part of the Anglo-Catholic movement in the Church of England and is a parish of The Society under the patronage of St Wilfrid and St Hilda. The population of the parish expanded greatly in the post-war period and currently stands at 14,063. The Church is also associated with the group Forward in Faith and receives alternative episcopal oversight from the Bishop of Beverley (currently Stephen Race).

== Organ ==
The organ dates from 1905 and was installed by John Compton. A specification of the organ can be found on the National Pipe Organ Register.
