= Operation Grand Slam (disambiguation) =

Operation Grand Slam was a military operational plan used by the Pakistan Army during the Indo-Pakistani War of 1965.

Operation Grand Slam may also refer to:

- A fictional scheme featured in:
  - Goldfinger (novel), a 1959 James Bond novel by Ian Fleming
  - Goldfinger (film), a 1964 James Bond film based on the Ian Fleming novel
- the code name for U.S. espionage mission 4154 over the Soviet Union that led to the 1960 U-2 incident
- Operation Grandslam, the United Nations-led military offensive operation launched in December 1962 during the Congo Crisis

== See also ==
- Exercise Grand Slam
- Grand Slam (disambiguation)
