= Slam =

Slam, SLAM or SLAMS may refer to:

== Arts, entertainment and media ==
=== Fictional elements ===
- S.L.A.M. (Strategic Long-Range Artillery Machine), a fictional weapon in the G.I. Joe universe
- SLAMS (Space-Land-Air Missile Shield), a fictional anti-ballistic missile system featured in Tom Clancy's EndWar and video games
- Slam Tasmanian, cartoon character in the American animated series Loonatics Unleashed

=== Films ===
- Slam (1998 film), an American film starring Saul Williams and Beau Sia
- Slam (2016 film), an Italian film based on the novel of the same name by Nick Hornby
- Slam (2018 film), an Australian feature directed by Partho Sen-Gupta

=== Literature ===
- Slam (novel), a novel by Nick Hornby
- Slam!, a novel by Walter Dean Myers about a high school basketball star from Harlem
- Slam, a novel by Lewis Shiner

=== Music ===
==== Albums ====
- Slam (Big Dipper album), 1990
- Slam (Joe Lynn Turner album), 2001
- Slam (soundtrack), from the 1998 film
- Slam (Dan Reed Network album), a 1989 album by Dan Reed Network
- Slam, a 1978 album by Suburban Studs

==== Songs ====
- "Slam" (Humanoid song), 1989
- "Slam" (Onyx song), 1993
- "Slam" (Pendulum song), 2005
- "Slam", a song by Bow Wow
- "Slam", a song by Seaway from Colour Blind
- "Slam", a 2002 song by A-Teens from Pop 'til You Drop!
- "Slam", a 2009 song by Anna Arbeu from Just a Pretty Face?

==== Other music ====
- Slam (DJs), an electronic music production and DJ duo from Glasgow
- Save Live Australian Music, a 2010 rally in Melbourne, Australia
- Slam death metal or "slam", a style of death metal

=== Other arts, entertainment and media ===
- Slam (cards), a contract in card games in which the player undertakes to win all tricks
- Slam (magazine), a basketball publication
- SLAM! (radio station), a Dutch radio station based in Naarden
- Poetry slam, a competition in which poets of all ages perform spoken word poetry
- Slam! Sports, a section of the website Canadian Online Explorer
- Slamdancing, a style of dance

== Science and technology ==
=== Computing ===
- Simultaneous localization and mapping, a navigation technique used by robots and autonomous vehicles
- SLAM project, a Microsoft research project
- Simulation Language for Analogue Modelling, a simulation language, versions based on Fortran and GASP
- Spectre based on Linear Address Masking (SLAM), a variant of Spectre-BHI

=== Weapons ===
- Selectable Lightweight Attack Munition, a small United States multi-purpose landmine
- Shoulder-Launched Antiaircraft Missile, a competing design proposal rejected in favor of the FIM-43 Redeye
- Standoff Land Attack Missile, a 1990s over-the-horizon, all-weather cruise missile
- Submarine Launched Airflight Missile, an experimental variant of the British Blowpipe
- Supersonic Low Altitude Missile, a cancelled 1950s U.S. Air Force nuclear-powered cruise missile project

=== Other science ===
- Signaling lymphocytic activation molecule, a family of genes

== Sports ==
- Body slam, in wrestling
- Chennai Slam, an Indian basketball team

== Other uses ==
- SLAM (clothing), a manufacturer of clothing based in Italy
- Saint Louis Art Museum, in St. Louis, Missouri, US
- South London and Maudsley NHS Foundation Trust, a group of hospitals
- S. L. A. Marshall, brigadier general and military journalist and historian

== See also ==
- Grand Slam (disambiguation)
- Slam dunk (disambiguation)
