= Lagardère Live Entertainment =

French entertainment agency

- Formerly: Lagardère Unlimited; Lagardère Sports and Entertainment
- Type: Subsidiary
- Industry: Entertainment
- Predecessor: Sportfive (2001–2015)
- Successor: Sportfive (replacing Lagardère Sports only, from 2020)
- Headquarters: Boulogne-Billancourt, France
- Key people: Ugo Valensi (CEO)
- Services: Live entertainment
- Owner: Lagardère Group (via Lagardère Media)
- Number of employees: 1,600 (2018)

Lagardère Live Entertainment is an entertainment agency subsidiary of Lagardère Group. The subsidiary was formed as Lagardère Sports and Entertainment by the merger of several brands under the group, including Sportfive; World Sport Group; IEC in Sports; Sports Marketing and Management; and Lagardère Unlimited Inc.

After partial sale of Lagardère Sports in 2020 and subsequent full sale in 2021, the remaining division became Lagardère Live Entertainment.

== History ==
In 2007, Lagardère Group, via an intermediate holding company Lagardère Sports, acquired the entire share capital of International Events and Communication in Sports (IEC in Sports) and in 2008 acquired about 70% of the stake of World Sport Group Holdings. Lagardère Group also owned Sportfive S.A. since 2006. In 2010, Lagardère Sports became Lagardère Unlimited.

In 2015 Lagardère Unlimited was renamed Lagardère Sports and Entertainment, and the entertainment subdivision was renamed from "Lagardère Unlimited Live Entertainment" to "Lagardère Live Entertainment". All the sports agencies previously under Lagardère Unlimited were renamed to use the brand "Lagardère Sports".

In 2015 Lagardère Live Entertainment acquired société d'exploitation du Bataclan, the organization that operates the Bataclan Theater, one of the sites of the November 2015 Paris attacks.

On 19 January 2016 Lagardère Sports signed a partnership agreement with brand communications firm Sponsorship 360.

On 8 August 2016 Lagardère Sports acquired New York City-based brand communications firm Rooftop2 Productions.

On 1 June 2017, it was announced that Lagardère Sports had sold the naming rights of Juventus Stadium to Allianz for 2017–18 to 2022–23 seasons. Lagardère Sports' predecessor Sportfive purchased the naming rights (and other concession) in 2008 for €75 million and was due to start in 2011–12 season.

In 2021, Lagardère Sports was fully divested (as revived Sportfive) to H.I.G. Capital. H.I.G. Capital already owned 75% of Lagardère Sports since 2020.

=== Lagardère Sports Asia ===
Lagardère Sports Asia, formerly known as World Sport Group, was acquired by Lagardère in 2008 and renamed (and reorganized its subsidiary structure) in 2015. World Sport Group angered many Asian football fans by increasing the price of the broadcasting rights for the FIFA World Cup Qualifiers 2014 (Asia Region), meaning home fans in South Korea could not watch their international team. Also, expatriate Iranian fans could not watch the match in Europe or the Americas.

The company also formed a joint venture with the Asian Football Confederation (AFC) for the AFC Asian Cup in 2011. It also runs a media channel for the AFC.
