= Sofology =

Sofa retailer based in Northern England

Sofology Ltd
- Formerly: Sofaworks; CSL; Clayton Saleroom; CS Lounge Suites
- Type: Subsidiary
- Industry: Retail
- Founded: 1974; 52 years ago
- Headquarters: Golborne, United Kingdom
- Products: Furniture
- Parent: DFS Furniture
- Website: sofology.co.uk

Sofology (formerly known as Sofaworks, CSL, Clayton Salerooms, and CS Lounge Suites Ltd), is a British furniture retailer specialising in sofas.

== History ==
Sofology started out as CSL Sofas, and was originally an auction rooms based in Clayton-le-Moors, Accrington, Lancashire. In 1982, after including catalogue seconds lounge furniture, they moved into specialist sofa retail and manufacture. The company originally started as a high street store chain, selling only its own products.

Around 2002, CSL Sofas ceased sofa manufacture in the United Kingdom, citing that it could source products in Europe, Eastern Europe and the Far East at better value. The business focuses on retailing leather sofas, fabric sofas, corner sofas and recliner sofas.

In December 2015, Sofaworks rebranded to Sofology, following the loss of a court case against a competitor who argued that the Sofaworks name infringed on one of its owned brands.

In December 2010, it saw 260 complaints to the ASA. This was as a result of an advert created to remake "Girls on Film", by Duran Duran. This used scantily clad women around the sofas. However, the complaints were not upheld, and the advert was allowed to run. In October 2017, DFS announced the purchase of Sofology in a £25 million deal. The acquisition was ratified by the Competition and Markets Authority in November 2017.

The business was runner-up in the 2010 Manchester Evening News Business of the Year (lost to Pets at Home). However, in 2010, it came first in Business XL Fastest Growing Business.

From December 2013 to April 2016, adverts for the company featured a Three-toed sloth named Neal and they were narrated by English actor Craig Cash.

Sofology featured Owen Wilson in two marketing campaigns, which began in November 2017. From May 2021, Helena Bonham Carter has featured in their commercials.
