= Listed buildings in Cantley, South Yorkshire =

Cantley is a civil parish in the metropolitan borough of Doncaster, South Yorkshire, England. The parish contains eight listed buildings that are recorded in the National Heritage List for England. Of these, one is listed at Grade II*, the middle of the three grades, and the others are at Grade II, the lowest grade. The parish contains the village of Old Cantley and the surrounding area. The major building in the parish is Cantley Hall, which is listed, together with its stables, a house in the drive, and the ha-ha and a sundial in the grounds. The other listed buildings are a former windmill, a mill chimney, and a barn.

== Key ==
Grade	Criteria
II*	Particularly important buildings of more than special interest
II	Buildings of national importance and special interest

== Buildings ==
Name and location	Photograph	Date	Notes	Grade
Barn, Gatewood Farm; 53.52853°N 0.99676°W	—	Late 18th century	The barn is in red brick with an eaves band and a pantile roof. There are two storeys and six bays. It contains double doors under a segmental arch at the front and rear, slit vents, and square hatches.	II
Ha-ha, Cantley Hall; 53.51204°N 1.05999°W	—	Late 18th century	The ha-ha encloses the gardens of the house on the north, west and south sides. It is built with river boulders and magnesian limestone, and consists of a low wall in a U-shaped curve, with a ditch on the field side.	II
Cantley Hall and outbuildings 53.51227°N 1.05911°W		1785	A country house, it was altered in 1802, and a ballroom was added in 1870. It is in stuccoed brick with a Westmorland slate roof, and two storeys. The entrance front has seven bays, recessed on the left is a two-bay service block with a single-storey outbuilding, including an octagonal game larder, the garden front has eight bays, and a single-storey ballroom on the right. The entrance front has a plinth, the middle three bays project under a pediment with a dentilled eaves cornice. It contains an Ionic portico with a dentilled entablature, and the windows are sashes. On the garden front, canted projections flank the two-bay centre.	II*
Cantley Hall Stables; 53.51233°N 1.05811°W	—	Early 19th century	A stable block for Cantley Hall, it is in rendered brick with roofs of slate and asbestos sheet. There is a U-shaped plan, with a two-storey one-bay centre, with one-storey two-bay links to two-storey five-bay stable blocks with single-storey projecting wings. The central bay contains a segmental-arched carriage entrance, over which is a hipped roof and an apex finial and weathervane.	II
Cantley Mill; 53.50871°N 1.04835°W		Early 19th century	A former tower windmill, it is in red brick on a magnesian limestone base, and consists of a truncated cone. There are four storeys, it contains doorways and windows, on the rear is an inscribed and dated plaque, and at the top is a cast iron curb.	II
Sundial, Cantley Hall; 53.51217°N 1.05965°W	—	1842	The sundial is in the garden of the house. It is in magnesian limestone, and has a square pedestal, with a chamfered plinth, sunken panels, and a moulded cornice. On the top is a dated and inscribed circular disc in brass or bronze, and a simple gnomon.	II
Chimney, Cantley Mill; 53.50879°N 1.04807°W	—	1845	The free-standing mill chimney is in red brick, on a square sectioned plinth with a stone band. The shaft tapers and becomes octagonal at the top, where it is strapped by iron bands.	II
Hall Drive Cottage; 53.51223°N 1.05723°W	—	Mid 19th century	The house in the drive to Cantley Hall is in rendered brick on a plinth, with a moulded string course, overhanging eaves, and a hipped slate roof. There are two storeys, three bays, and a lean-to rear wing. The central porch has clasping pilasters and an entablature, and the doorway and a blind panel above have architraves. The windows are sashes with cornices on consoles.	II
