= Equestrian Grand Slam =

There are assorted accomplishments titled a "Grand Slam" in equestrian competition:

- The Grand Slam of American horse racing, winning the U.S. Triple Crown and the Breeders' Cup Classic
- The Grand Slam of Show Jumping named Rolex Grand Slam of Show Jumping
- The Grand Slam of Eventing named Rolex Grand Slam of Eventing

== Grand Slam of Show Jumping ==
The Grand Slam of Show Jumping, named Rolex Grand Slam of Show Jumping, was created in 2013. It brings together the four Majors, and refers to the achievement of winning all four:

- The CHIO Aachen in Germany (outdoor on grass)
- The Spruce Meadows "Masters" in Calgary in Canada (outdoor on grass)
- The CHI Geneva in Switzerland (indoor on sand)
- The Dutch Masters in Den Bosch in Netherlands (indoor on sand)

== Grand Slam of Eventing ==
The Grand Slam of Eventing, created in 1998 brings together the three Majors, and refers to the achievement of consecutively winning all three:

- Kentucky Three Day in Lexington, Kentucky, United States
- Badminton Horse Trials in Gloucestershire, England
- Burghley Horse Trials near Stamford, Lincolnshire, England
