= Live Company Group =

- Formerly: Ceylon & Indian Planters' Holdings plc; William Morris Fine Arts plc; Lincoln House plc; Wyefield Group plc; Orchard Furniture plc; World Sport Group plc; Parallel Media Group plc
- Type: public
- Traded as: AIM: LVCG
- ISIN: GB00BGSGT481
- Predecessor: The Ceylon & Indian Planters' Association
Founded
23 June 1959 in London	(Ceylon & Indian Planters' Holdings)
16 August 2001	(backdoor listing of World Sport Group plc)
- Founder: David Ciclitira (Parallel Media Group)
- Headquarters: Surrey, United Kingdom
- Key people: David Ciclitira (Chairman)
- Revenue: ▼£241,000 (2015)
- Operating income: ▲ (£266,000) (2015)
- Net income: ▲£611,000 (2015)
- Total assets: ▼£1,536,000 (2015)
- Total equity: ▲ (£1,162,000) (2015)
Owner
David Ciclitira	(33.92%)
Harwood Capital LLP	(28.23%)
BNY (OCS) Nominees	(6.31%)
Ranjit Murugason	(6.11%)
general public	(25.43%)
- Subsidiaries: Parallel Media Hong Kong; Parallel Media Korea (New Media); Parallel Media Group Asia; The Championship (Singapore); Parallel Media Europe; Parallel Smart Media; Parallel Smart Media UK; PGAA Media
- Website: www.livecompanygroup.com
- Footnotes in consolidated financial statement; profit included one-off item of selling a subsidiary

Live Company Group PLC formerly known as Parallel Media Group PLC, World Sport Group PLC and Orchard Furniture PLC, is a public company based in Surrey and formerly in London. The company is listed in the Alternative Investment Market. The company was the parent company of both World Sport Group (Jersey) Limited and Parallel Media Group International Limited from 2001 to 2002. However, the founders of World Sport Group Limited bought back WSG in 2002; while World Sport Group plc was renamed to Parallel Media Group plc. Parallel Media Group involved in sports and media agency. However, under the previous name, the listed company was founded as holding company for tea business, and then foundry in 1984, and then furniture businesses in the 1980s.

== Predecessors ==
The legal person of Live Company Group plc, was formerly known as Parallel Media Group plc, Orchard Furniture plc, Wyefield Group plc, Lincoln House plc, William Morris Fine Arts plc and Ceylon & Indian Planters Holdings' plc. It is a listed company in the Alternative Investment Market and formerly in the Unlisted Securities Market of the London Stock Exchange.

=== Ceylon & Indian Planters ===
Ceylon & Indian Planters' Holdings plc was incorporated on 23 June 1959, at that time known as Ceylon & Indian Planters' Holdings Limited. The company was established to acquire the full or part of the share capital of The Ceylon & Indian Planters' Association Limited. The Ceylon & Indian Planters' Association, established on 23 April 1897, was known as a pioneer tea company. In the 1900s, The Ceylon & Indian Planters' Association was already a public company.

According to The Guardian, Ceylon and Indian Planters' Holdings [sic] was a listed company in the London Stock Exchange until 1976. In 1976, the exchange cancelled the share quotes of Ceylon and Indian Planters, (Note: The 1976 news report stated Ceylon and Indian Planters' Holdings (the parent company) was cancelled from share quotes by the London Stock Exchange, but the 1983 news report stated the delisted entity was Ceylon and Indian Planters' Association (the subsidiary); Ceylon and Indian Planters' Holdings started to appear in the news section for the public companies circa 1960 and Ceylon and Indian Planters' Association ceased to appear in the same section in the same year.) as well as more than a dozen of other similar companies, as the assets of Ceylon and Indian Planters was nationalized by the government of Sri Lanka (as well as India), formerly known as Ceylon (as the Dominion of Ceylon from 1948 to 1972).

In 1982, the 1959 incorporated Ceylon & Indian Planters' Holdings was re-registered from a private company limited by shares to a public limited company. While the former subsidiary, The Ceylon & Indian Planters' Association also switched to plc legal form in April 1983.

In 1983, the 1897 incorporated Ceylon & Indian Planters' Association returned to the London Stock Exchange as a cash shell, but in the Exchange's Unlisted Securities Market division. That company also acquired electronic companies as a backdoor listing. It was renamed to Sunleigh Electronics plc. On 31 May 1983, and then just Sunleigh plc from 23 May 1989 to 8 December 2008. That company was dissolved on the same day. Immediate after the listing of Sunleigh Electronics, as of 1983, it was 58% owned by the 5 directors of the company. An additional 21% shares were owned by the former owner of Sunleigh Electronics' subsidiaries as of 1983.

A year later, the former parent company of Sunleigh Electronics, the 1959 incorporated Ceylon & Indian Planters' Holdings, acquired other companies and renaming to William Morris Fine Arts plc. The company also admitted to the Unlisted Securities Market in the same year.

=== William Morris Fine Arts ===
In April 1984, Ceylon & Indian Planters' Holdings plc became a listed company in the Unlisted Securities Market, as well as acquiring Morris Singer Foundry Limited as well as wallpaper trading and manufacturing company Peterlee Wallpaper. The public limited company was renamed into William Morris Fine Arts plc immediately. In December 1984, William Morris acquired the wallcovering division of Leyland Paint & Wallpaper plc for £3.3 million. In 1988 the listed company ceased to use the name William Morris Fine Arts.

=== Lincoln House, Wyefield Group & Orchard Furniture ===
William Morris Fine Arts became a furniture company under the name Lincoln House plc in 1988.

Lincoln House acquired Medallion Upholstery for £8.2 million in 1994, renaming itself to Wyefield Group in the same year. The Factory of Medallion was closed down in 1998, making the company had only one manufacturing site left, located in Derbyshire.

It became a shell company (as cash shell) again in 1999. The company was renamed to Orchard Furniture plc, with no assets and negative shareholders' equity. Before turning into a cash shell, the company had sold its subsidiaries: Medallion Upholstery, Lincoln House (Furnishings) and Quantum Designs Furniture as well as assets, to another listed company DFS Furniture Company plc for £1.5 million. However, Orchard Furniture acquired Jersey-incorporated holding companies World Sport Group (Jersey) Limited and Parallel Media Group International Limited as part of a backdoor listing of the two agency groups in 2001.

== History ==
=== Parallel Media Group plc and World Sport Group plc ===
The businesses of Parallel Media Group plc was founded in 1987 by David Ciclitira as [old] Parallel Media Group plc.

In 1997, [old] Parallel Media Group plc was renamed into Elysian Group plc; a sister company Parallel Media Group International Limited (PMI) was incorporated in Jersey, receiving businesses from the old PMG. It formed a joint venture, Parallel Television, with the CNBC in 1998.

In 2001, PMI and fellow agency World Sport Group (Jersey) Limited (WSG) were backdoor listing as World Sport Group plc. However, the founders of WSG re-privatized WSG in 2002, leaving PMI as the major assets of the public limited company. The plc also renamed to [new] Parallel Media Group plc. The Daily Telegraph described Parallel Media Group as "one of the major names in sports and music promotion and events". Since the takeover in 2001, David Ciclitira was the chairman of the plc.

Parallel Media Group plc sold a subsidiary, "Parallel Media Group (Championships) Limited", in 2015, to the chairman, the largest shareholder and the creditor of the plc, David Ciclitira as a connected-parties transaction. During the year the company was the broker for Maroon 5 tour in Hong Kong.

The company is the media agency of The Championship at Laguna National, a golf tournament since 2008. The tournament was co-sanctioned (permission) by both Asian Tour and European Tour. The contract with the Championship was renewed in 2013. Parallel Media Group started to plan a golf tournament in 2004, after the company part away with World Sport Group Limited, the agency employed by Asian Tour and the original joint venture entity in the Tour de las Américas. Parallel Media Group also won a court ruling to protect its contractual commercial rights on the Tour de las Américas in 2003.

=== Live Company Group ===
On 22 December 2017, the public company was once again renamed to Live Company Group plc.
