= Sportfive =

Sports marketing agency

- Type: Subsidiary
- Industry: Sports Marketing
- Founded: 2001
- Headquarters: Hamburg, Germany
- Key people: Stefan Felsing (CEO), Philipp Hasenbein (COO), Robert Müller von Vultejus (CGO), Christian Peters (CFO)
- Services: Sports marketing; sports events; sports sponsorship
- Owner: H.I.G. Capital (100%)
- Number of employees: 1,200
- Website: www.sportfive.com

Sportfive (stylized as SPORTFIVE) is a German based international sports marketing agency with offices around the world. The agency operates in sports consulting, partnership sales, marketing and sponsorship activation. Its headquarters are located in Hamburg, Germany. Sportfive employs around 1,200 people and markets over 30 different sports disciplines, including football, American football, baseball, basketball, esports & gaming, golf, handball and motorsport. Since 2020, Sportfive has been part of US private equity firm H.I.G. Capital.

== History ==
In 1987, UFA first secured the rights to broadcast Bundesliga games in a deal with German Football Association (DFB), as well as the rights to broadcast the Wimbledon Championships. This led to the development of the sports rights marketing business under UFA Sports.

Sportfive was formed in 2001, after the acquisition of joint control of the French sports rights agency Groupe Jean-Claude Darmon SA (GJCD) by Canal+ and RTL Group had been cleared by the European Commission. As part of the deal, Canal+ and RTL merged their sports rights agencies, respectively Sport+ and UFA Sports, to become Sportfive.

The newly formed agency was one of the first in Germany to implement naming rights sponsoring and has been supporting companies in the procurement of stadium names since 2001. For example, Sportfive brokered the deal that led to the Hamburger SV's Volksparkstadion becoming the AOL Arena. In 2001, Sportfive became marketing agent for Arminia Bielefeld, as well as Atalanta BC.

In 2003, Sportfive took over its Munich-based competitor ISPR, which had been marketing Bundesliga rights abroad. One year later, RTL Group and Canal+ sold their shares in Sportfive to the private equity firm Advent International. As part of the takeover, a new company was founded in which the RTL Group held a 25% stake once again. Two years later, in November 2006, Sportfive was taken over by the French conglomerate Lagardère for an estimated €865 million. In 2008, Lagardère Sports acquired around 70% of the voting rights and capital of Seamus O'Brien's World Sport Group (WSG), a sports marketing, event management and media company in Asia, with a roster of golf, association football and cricket events.

In 2005, Sportfive was commissioned by the City of Hamburg to coordinate the city's marketing activities for the 2006 FIFA World Cup in Germany. Subsequently, the agency marketed television rights for the 2008 UEFA Euro Football Championships and organized the sale of the official hospitality program for the 2010 FIFA Football World Cup in South Africa in continental Europe. Additionally, Sportfive marketed the 2009 World Athletics Championships in Berlin and was appointed by the International Olympic Committee (IOC) as its official media rights agent for the 2012 and 2016 Summer Olympics, as well as the 2014 Winter Olympics. In August 2012, Sportfive organized the friendly game between Dinamo Bucharest and FC Barcelona at the Arena Națională in Bucharest, Romania. Further, Sportfive launched the channel Sportdigital in cooperation with the German handball, basketball and volleyball Bundesliga. At the time, Sportfive's clients included more than 270 sports clubs and athletes. The clients came from various disciplines such as handball, basketball, rugby and motorsport, as well as boxing (Klitschko brothers).

In 2015, following the acquisition of the remaining shares of WSG by the Lagardère Group, all sports marketing agencies within the group, including Sportfive, WSG, IEC in Sports, Sports Marketing and Management (SMAM) and Lagardère Unlimited Inc. were integrated into Lagardère Sports and Entertainment and renamed Lagardère Sports S.A.S.

In May 2020, the agency was rebranded back to Sportfive following its takeover by H.I.G. Europe, an arm of the international private equity and asset management firm H.I.G. Capital. H.I.G. acquired a 75.1% stake in the business in April 2020, and the remaining shares in July 2021. The rebranding to Sportfive followed the restructuring of the agency's global leadership team. The executive committee included Stefan Felsing, Philipp Hasenbein, and Robert Müller von Vultejus, respectively former executives at Sportfive and Lagardère Sports. That same year, Sportfive founded its own esports division. Since 2022, there has been a cooperation with the global esports organization Gen.G. Following this, Sportfive signed a cooperation deal with Ampverse, as well as being appointed as the official sales agency of Fnatic for global partnerships.

In Spring 2022, Sportfive launched its own creator collective called SQVAD with a focus on esports and gaming, but also other lifestyle themes like fashion and music. Among the subsidiaries of SQVAD are the event management company Event Knowledge Services (EKS), the creative agency Brave and the German-based esports agency Build a Rocket, which Sportfive had previously acquired in 2021.

In May 2022, Sportfive announced the acquisition of brand-focused marketing agency Wolfe Solutions. As part of the acquisition, Wolfe Solutions was rebranded under the Sportfive banner and integrated into the organization, in addition to Sportfive expanding its operations in the US by retaining Wolfe Solutions' Columbia and South Carolina offices.

In March 2023, Sportfive was tapped by Concacaf to lead their digital marketing services for national teams competitions, including the Gold Cup, W Gold Cup, Nations League, and more.

In 2023, Sportfive appointed former CEO of WSG O’Brien as president of the agency's Asia–Pacific division. The same year, Sportfive and Dojo founded the joint venture Dravt, an agency for pop culture in the sports business. In November 2023, CONMEBOL brought on Sportfive to handle Copa América's digital marketing across all languages and iterations of the tournament.

In 2024, Sportfive, together with football advisor Marc Kosicke, founded the agency ProjectFive, which publicly represents athletes and sports personalities such as Jürgen Klopp. Over the course of 2025, Sportfive expanded its business into Italy and Switzerland.

== Business operations ==
Sportfive markets over 30 sports. In addition to football, these include predominantly American football, basketball, handball, motor sports like Formula One, golf, baseball and esports & gaming. Other sports include cycling, endurance sports, field hockey, horse racing, rugby, sailing, swimming, surfing, table tennis, weightlifting and winter sports.

The agency markets campaigns and endorsement agreements for a variety of clients in the sports sector, as well as representing individual international athletes. These include services for rights holders and companies, such as distribution strategies, internationalization, (virtual) A-boards and stadium advertising, jersey sponsorship, international media rights, athlete marketing, hospitality programs, travel services, creative sponsorship campaigns as well as digital services such as apps and product innovations. Further, the agency supports realization of those concepts with teams based at the respective club.

The agency is also a broker for sporting events such as Olympics & multi-sport events. For example, the Australian Commonwealth Games entered into a long-term partnership with Sportfive during the preparations for the Birmingham 2022 Commonwealth Games. Further, the agency also arranged for the Bank of America to become the presenting partner of the Boston Marathon in 2022. In the field of Twenty20 cricket, Sportfive is involved as a marketing partner in the newly established 2025 cricket tournament, the International Masters League.

The agency works with various national and international brands and companies such as Trivago, Jeep, Nike, BMW, Emirates, Red Bull or Kellogg's and media companies such as Sky Group and DAZN.

=== American Football ===
Sportfive supports the Kansas City Chiefs with their international strategy, asset development and commercial marketing such as expanding its presence and marketing in Germany. The New York Jets have also partnered with Sportfive to support their market presence in the UK.

=== Baseball ===
Sportfive works with the Los Angeles Dodgers and is responsible for finding a field presenting partner for the Dodgers Stadium and securing the first jersey partnership for Major League Baseball.

=== Basketball ===
In the US, Sportfive has partnerships with the Los Angeles Lakers, New York Knicks and Chicago Bulls. The collaboration with the Los Angeles Lakers began in 2020 and resulted in the first global partnership for the Lakers with bibigo, a Korean food company. Sportfive was also responsible for the Lakers' partnership with the asset management company DWS as a global investment sponsor. The DWS logo can be seen on the Crypto.com Arena at home games. The same year, Sportfive started to support the Chicago Bulls in the development of a worldwide distribution network, for example to further expand the fan base in France. The New York Knicks hired Sportfive in 2023 to search for a new jersey partner.

Sportfive works with FC Bayern Basketball and is responsible for sponsor and partner acquisition, team and project management for the club as well as marketing its esports team. Further, the agency also initiated the partnership between Kellogg's and the German Basketball Association (DBB), specifically with youth and women's basketball teams, featuring the Kellogg's logo on all U15 to U19 national teams' jerseys. In addition, Kellogg's is featured on A-boards at all international home matches and in other content formats.

=== Esports ===
In 2020, Sportfive founded its own esports division, and launched its own creative collective SQVAD. The collective of three German content creators operates with new media channels to implement projects around esports and gaming, as well as fashion and music. Further, the agency cooperates with the esports organization Gen.G, which owns and operates teams that compete in games such as League of Legends (LoL), NBA 2K, Fortnite, Valorant, Overwatch and PUBG. Sportfive is responsible for marketing Gen.G's commercial rights, including securing long-term partnerships and managing sponsorship commitments. Additionally, Sportfive cooperates with Ampverse, as well as with Fnatic.

=== Football ===
Sportfive works with various national and international rights holders in football. These rights holders include football associations such as FIFA, UEFA and the Asian Football Confederation, as well as leagues such as the Premier League, the Bundesliga, the Serie A and the Barclays Women's Super League.

Sportfive cooperated or cooperates with more than 17 top football clubs in Germany such as FC Bayern Munich, Hamburger SV, Hertha BSC, 1. FC Union Berlin, FC Schalke 04, Bayer 04 Leverkusen, and Borussia Dortmund. In Germany, the company was instrumental in brokering the naming rights for the HSH Nordbank Arena in Hamburg, the Commerzbank Arena in Frankfurt, or the Signa Iduna Park in Dortmund. Further, Sportfive is the overall marketer for more than 70 European football clubs, including Paris Saint-Germain F.C., Olympique Lyon and AS Monaco from the French Ligue 1, Atalanta BC, U.C. Sampdoria and Juventus FC from Italy’s Serie A, PAOK from the Super League Greece, as well as English clubs such as Chelsea F.C., Liverpool F.C., Tottenham Hotspur and Manchester City, or Spanish clubs Atlético Madrid and Real Madrid CF. There are also cooperations with national teams such as the United States men's national soccer team.

The cooperations may vary depending on the demand. VfB Stuttgart, for example, entered into a comprehensive partnership with Sportfive up to and including 2027/2028. Among other things, the agency is supposed to support VfB Stuttgart in its search for sponsors and in marketing the modernized stadium for UEFA Euro 2024. Since 2010, Chelsea F.C. has been cooperating with Sportfive. This involves Sportfive marketing players from the first squad on behalf of Chelsea F.C. in Europe, as well as connecting them with larger and local brands as part of its own ambassador program. In 2021, the agency facilitated the partnership between travel provider Trivago and Chelsea F.C. In 2022, Sportfive enabled a jersey sponsorship for the Spanish club Atlético Madrid by the Cryptocurrency investment app Whalefin.

Previous clients were the Italian clubs Juventus F.C., Atalanta BC and U.C. Sampdoria.

One of Sportfive's largest projects is the marketing and provision of the official hospitality packages for the UEFA Euro 2024, for which the UEFA commissioned Hospitality Experience AG, a joint venture between Sportfive and Fortius AG.

=== Formula 1 ===
In motorsports, Sportfive works with several racing series on commercial and marketing strategies. In Formula One, Sportfive has worked with Mercedes-Benz and Scuderia Ferrari among others. Sportfive is responsible for acquiring sponsors for Mercedes' Formula One team, e.g., the partnership with Starwood.

=== Handball ===
For the International Handball Federation (IHF), Sportfive manages the marketing of worldwide media rights and the marketing rights for all IHF World Championships until 2031. This includes the World Championships for men's and women's youth and seniors as well as the IHF Olympic Qualification Tournaments, the IHF Beach Handball World Championships for men and women and the IHF Beach Handball Global Tour. At the 2023 Men's World Handball Championships in Poland and Sweden, Sportfive gained Falken Tire Europe and Trivago, among others, as official partners of the IHF World Championship 2023. Falken Tire Europe obtained the title and logo rights, as well as the advertising rights. The branding of the official online travel partner Trivago appeared during the World Cup matches. Sportfive also served as the official partner for the sale of hospitality club packages for the championship matches in Poland.

Sportfive was also responsible for the media production of the 2023 World Women's Handball Championship in Norway, Sweden and Denmark. The agency produced the world feed and distributed the matches all over the world. Sportfive also ran the commercial program on behalf of the championship as well as on behalf of the IHF. Further, Sportfive is the exclusive sales agency for the French Handball Federation. As part of this agreement, Sportfive assists the Federation in developing its sponsorship revenues in France and abroad.

=== Golf ===
The agency marketed the hospitality programs at the 2014 Ryder Cup in Scotland. In addition, Sportfive will oversee all aspects of the Myrtle Beach PGA Tour 2024 and managed several other PGA Tour tournaments, including The American Express, the Fortinet Championship, Barbasol Championship, and Puerto Rico Open, as well as the Lecom Suncoast Classic on the Korn Ferry Tour. Several golfers are also under contract, including Jon Rahm, Lilia Vu, and John Catlin. Through the acquisition of Gaylord Sports Management in 2012, Sportfive acquired clients such as professional players Phil Mickelson and Keegan Bradley. Sportfives's golf operations were further expanded by the acquisition of golf event company Jeff Sanders Promotion of Beaverton in 2012. In addition to promotion of professional players and event management, the agency also markets equipment partnerships to players, for example with Callaway Golf Company, or TravisMathew apparel and Cuarter footwear. In 2021, Sportfive acquired golf event management, consulting and distribution company Global Golf Management.

== Corporate structure ==
The company is managed globally by Stefan Felsing (Chief Executive Officer), Philipp Hasenbein (Chief Operating Officer), Robert Müller von Vultejus (Chief Growth Officer) and Christian Peters (Chief Financial Officer). The agency has offices in:

- South-West Asia: United Arab Emirates,
- Pacific Asia: Japan, South Korea, Singapore, China, Australia,
- Europe: Germany, Poland, Hungary, Spain, Switzerland, Netherlands, UK, France,
- USA: New York, Columbia, Dallas, Scottsdale, St. Simons Island, Washington, D.C.

=== Subsidiaries ===
Sportfive's subsidiaries include, among others, the companies EKS, Brave and Build a Rocket. The latter is an esports agency that provides consulting, strategy and marketing campaigns for companies in the esports sector. Brave is a production company and provides creative and content development services, which produced for example Rio Ferdinand’s Tipping Point. Based in Switzerland, EKS was formed in 1998 as part of an effort by the IOC to formalise the transfer of knowledge from one Olympic Games organiser to the next and provides technical execution of event planning, production, and operational services.

==== Build a Rocket ====
Build a Rocket is a gaming agency that provides consulting and marketing campaigns for companies in the gaming sector. The GmbH was founded in 2016 in Cologne, where it has been headquartered ever since. The company also has offices in Barcelona, London, Paris, New York and Seoul. The agency's founders and managing directors are Alexander Albrecht and Tobias Heim. In 2025, Build a Rocket collaborated with the Deutsche Fußball Liga to promote the Bundesliga on gaming platforms such as Roblox.

== Bibliography ==
- Bergmann, Andreas (2023). "Rechte und Rechteverwertung im Sport" [Rights and exploitation of rights in sport]. In Bergmann, Andreas (ed.). Verwertung kommerzieller Rechte im Sportmarketing – Theorieüberblick und Praxiseinblick [Exploitation of commercial rights in sports marketing – theoretical overview and practical insight] (in German). Wiesbaden: Springer Gabler. pp. 1–33. ISBN 978-3-658-42469-5
- Bruhn, Manfred; Rohlmann, Peter (2022). "Vertriebswege im Sportmarketing" [Distribution channels in sports marketing]. In Bruhn, Manfred (ed.). Sportmarketing: Grundlagen – Strategien – Instrumente [Sports Marketing: Basics – Strategies – Instruments] (in German). Wiesbaden: Springer Gabler. pp. 71–77. ISBN 978-3-658-37175-3.
