= World Sport Group =

Sports marketing company

World Sport Group Holdings
- Trade name: World Sport Group
- Company type: subsidiary
- Industry: Sports Marketing
- Predecessor: AFC Marketing Limited
- Founded: 1992 in Hong Kong (as AFC Marketing)
- Founder: Seamus O'Brien
- Defunct: 2015
- Successor: Lagardère Sports and Entertainment (2015-2020); Sportfive (2020-present)
- Headquarters: Singapore (general office); Tortola, BVI (registered office)
- Services: Sports marketing, sports events, sport sponsorship
- Owner: H.I.G. Capital
- Parent: Sportfive
- Subsidiaries: Sports Marketing & Management
- Website: wsgworld.com

Headquartered in Singapore, World Sport Group was a sports marketing, event management and media company in Asia, with a roster of golf, association football and cricket events. World Sport Group manages almost 600 days of sports events annually, across more than 30 countries in the region. In 2015 it was merged into the Lagardère Sports and Entertainment division of Lagardère Group (which was the parent company from 2008 to 2020), renamed as Lagardère Sports Asia.

World Sport Group was the exclusive marketing partner of the Asian Football Confederation (AFC), the ASEAN Football Federation (AFF), and a major stake-holder in Asian golf as organizers of the Barclays Singapore Open and the ASEAN Tour. The Group also managed global cricket player Sachin Tendulkar and had formed a partnership with the Board of Control for Cricket in India (BCCI) for the ground and title naming rights for the Indian National Team's domestic matches. In partnership with Sony Corporation, the Group was awarded the global media rights for the Indian Premier League (IPL), the Twenty20 cricket competition. The 10-year deal was valued at over US$1.6 billion.

The Group was also a member of the Singapore Sports Hub Consortium, the group that won the bid in 2018 to build, operate and manage a sports, entertainment and lifestyle hub in Singapore that was due for completion in 2011.

With the sale of Lagardère Sports to H.I.G. Capital, World Sport Group assets are now managed by revived Sportfive.

== Historical events ==
Events formerly supported by the World Sports Group included:

- Hero Honda Indian Open
- SAIL Open Golf Championship
- Volvo Masters of Asia
- Omega China Tour

== History ==
=== Foundation and early years ===
World Sport Group was founded in Hong Kong in 1992 as AFC Marketing Limited as a media broker for the Asian Football Confederation. (AFC Marketing itself was dissolved by striking-off in 2006) At that time the director of the company was Seamus Hamilton O'Brien and Jack Kazunori Sakazaki; the shareholders were British Virgin Islands incorporated Park House Holdings Limited (40%), Nina Finance Corporation (40%) and Oakstaff Investments Limited (20%).

It then expended into other fields such as golf (as Asian PGA Tour Limited), for Asian Tour), basketball (as ABC Promotions Limited), cricket (as WSG Nimbus Pte Limited), TV rights (as Asia Sport Television Limited) and publishing (as WSG (Asia) Limited). In Australia, World Sport Group operated WSG (Oceania) Pty Ltd., PGA Tour Enterprises Pty Ltd. (a joint venture), Sports Marketing and Management Pty Ltd., Javelin Pty Ltd.; in Europe: WSG Europe Ltd., Ladies European Tour Enterprises Ltd. (a joint venture), Sports Marketing and Management (UK) Ltd., Global Cricket Corporation Pte Ltd.; in America as WSG Americas Inc. and Tour de las Americas Ltd. (joint venture).

=== Listing and re-privatization ===
Circa 2000 the holding company of the group was British Virgin Islands incorporated The World Sport Group Limited. In the eve of acquisition and listing into Alternative Investment Market, the Jersey incorporated World Sport Group (Jersey) Limited became the intermediate holding company of the group. From 2001 to 2002 World Sport Group was the subsidiary of World Sport Group plc (along with fellow sport broker Parallel Media Group International Limited), a listed company now known as Parallel Media Group plc.

After the founder re-acquired World Sport Group from the public company in 2002, BVI incorporated World Sport Group Holdings became the holding company.

=== Acquired by Lagardère ===
World Sport Group was sold for the second time in 2008 to Lagardère Group, becoming Lagardère Sports Asia in 2015.

== Ownership ==
The World Sport Group Limited (via World Sport Group (Jersey) Limited) and Parallel Media Group International Limited were acquired by Orchard Furniture plc in 2001. Orchard Furniture was also renamed into World Sport Group plc in the same year but known as Parallel Media Group plc after 2002.

World Sport Group plc was owned by chairman David Ciclitira for 21.11% stake, as well as Park House Holdings for 27.41% stake as at 31 December 2001. Park House Holdings was owned by the founder and high officials of The World Sport Group Limited, Seamus O'Brien and Anthony Morgan.

Park House Holdings re-acquired the brand and the subsidiary from the public company on 13 November 2002. In 2004 Dentsu acquired a 30% stake in World Sport Group Holdings, the parent company of World Sport Group. Although, 20% stake was sold by Dentsu in 2007–08 financial year that ended on 31 March. On 18 May 2008 Lagardère Group, via its subsidiary Lagardère Sports acquired approx. 70% stake of World Sport Group Holdings by acquiring a 78.60% stake of a company called World Sport Group Investments, which owned a 90% stake of World Sport Group Holdings.
