= Dwell (retailer) =

UK retailer of furniture

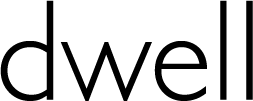
- Logo
- Type: Subsidiary
- Industry: Retailer
- Founded: May 9, 2003; 23 years ago
- Founders: Aamir Ahmad, Sean Galligan, Dave Garrett
- Successor: Coin Furniture Ltd.
- Headquarters: London, England, United Kingdom
- Number of locations: None
- Area served: United Kingdom
- Products: Modern, contemporary home furniture and accessories
- Parent: DFS
- Website: dwell.co.uk

Dwell is a retailer of furniture in the United Kingdom. The company was originally established in 2002 as Dwell Retail Ltd., and opened its first store in London the following year. The company was acquired by British retail group DFS in August 2014.

== History ==
Founded by Aamir Ahmad, Sean Galligan and Dave Garrett, Dwell began trading with a single store in Balham in 2003. It grew across London, with stores in Balham, Islington, Kingston, Richmond, Tottenham Court Road and Westfield.

In 2010, the company received £5m in funding from Key Capital Partners. The company announced plans to expand to 60 stores and 20 concessions across the UK within five years, and opened a flagship store on Tottenham Court Road. By the end of 2010 the company had 24 stores, including a concession in House of Fraser, and had locations across the UK, including Birmingham, Cardiff, Manchester and Glasgow.

The company subsequently entered administration and ceased trading. The brand name and furniture assets were purchased by the original founders through a new company called Coin Furniture Ltd (CFL).

In February 2014, Dwell entered into a marketing partnership with larger retailer, DFS. This led to Dwell's acquisition by DFS in August 2014.

Since being acquired, consolidation has resulted in the closure of all Dwell stores and concessions within DFS stores, and the closure of the dwell.co.uk public website. Dwell continues as a strand of the wider DFS public offering, representing a range of upmarket accessories and sofas on the DFS website.

== Current ==
The company is now a brand identity in the DFS collective group. There are no longer any standalone Dwell stores or concessions within DFS stores.

In February 2014, shortly after administration in 2013, Dwell entered into a marketing partnership with larger retailer, DFS. This led to Dwell's acquisition by DFS in August 2014.

The original founders retired in 2019 and management was taken over by CEO Peter Jenkins. He in turn departed some time later.
