= Graham Kirkham, Baron Kirkham =

British businessman (born 1944)

The Right Honourable The Lord Kirkham KCVO
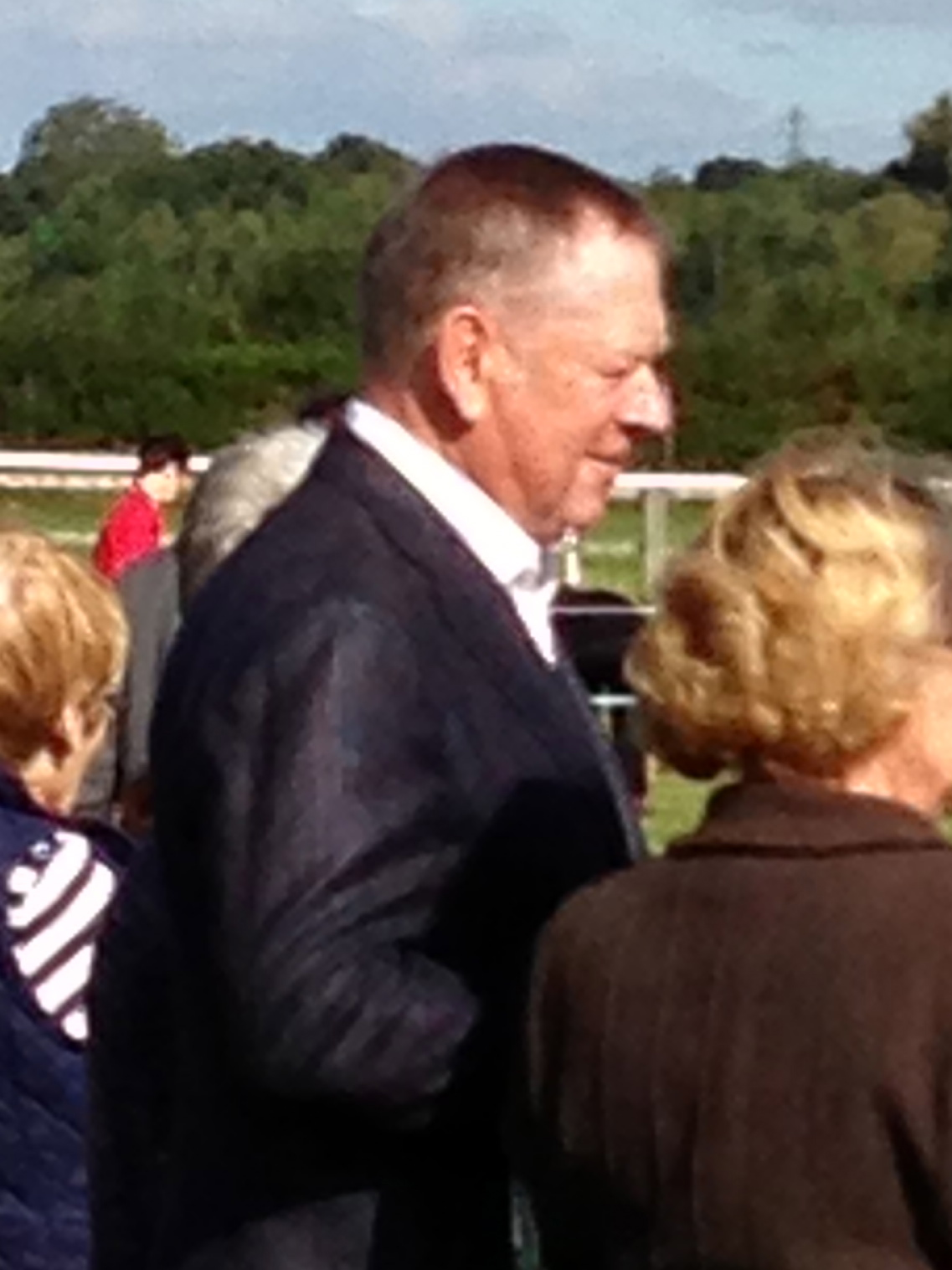
- Kirkham in 2013
- Born: 14 December 1944 (age 81); Doncaster, West Riding of Yorkshire, England
- Occupation: Businessman
- Years active: 1969–
- Title: Chairman, DFS
- Spouse: Pauline Fisher (m. 1965)
- Children: 2

Member of the House of Lords
- Lord Temporal
- Life peerage 23 July 1999

Graham Kirkham, Baron Kirkham, KCVO (born 14 December 1944) is an English businessman, founder of Northern Upholstery, and chairman of sofa retailer DFS.

Previously executive chairman of DFS Furniture Company Ltd, Kirkham is a strong political and financial supporter of the Conservative Party, and is one of South Yorkshire's richest men, with a personal fortune estimated at £1 billion. After selling DFS in April 2010 he now has a large share in Iceland supermarkets. He is also now involved in fish and chip shops having bought the Whitby chain.

== Early life ==
Adopted at the age of three weeks, he is the only son of Edlington miner Tom Kirkham and his wife Elsie: "My whole life has been the luck of going to a good family."

After passing the Eleven plus exam, he attended Maltby Grammar School (since 1967 called Maltby Comprehensive School) and hoped to join the Royal Air Force as a pilot. Failing to get the required five O levels, Kirkham got a job in a local furniture store.

== Career ==
=== Northern Upholstery ===
In 1969, having visited a few manufacturers in his daily work, he decided that making furniture was relatively easy and that by cutting out the warehouse dealers in the middle of the supply chain, he could sell direct to the public at cheaper prices. Kirkham rented a room above a snooker hall in Carcroft, and started making furniture upstairs and retailing it downstairs.

=== DFS ===
By 1983, Darley Dale–based Direct Furnishing Supplies had become one of Northern Upholstery biggest suppliers. When Direct Furnishing Supplies went bankrupt with debts of £900,000 on a turnover of £3,000,000, Kirkham bought it. Northern Upholstery now renamed itself DFS and at the time had a total of 63 stores employing 2,000 staff.

In 1993, DFS was floated on the stock market and valued at £271 million, with Kirkham and his family trusts owning just over half of the shares. This brought the Kirkham family to the attention of thieves, who in 1994 broke into the family home at Sprotbrough while they were on holiday. The burglars bound and gagged the housekeeper and made off with money and jewels worth £2.4m – later recovered, but still South Yorkshire's largest armed robbery.

In 1998 DFS announced its first drop in profits in 28 years to the London Stock Exchange. In 2000 DFS announced a 79 per cent profit increase.

But the revival was short lived, and in light of the continuing prevalence for private equity, Kirkham took the chain private again, leveraging his family's own 9.46% stake with £150 million of family funds in an eventual £496 million deal. Kirkham told the Yorkshire Post: "It's something that's caused me fitful sleep in the time I've been thinking about it. I've no hobby, this is my hobby – it's what I do. I'm an entrepreneur. It's almost as if I can feel the adrenaline running through my veins."

On 23 April 2010, it was announced that DFS had been sold to private equity firm Advent International for a reported £500m.

== Conservative party donations ==
Kirkham is well known for his donations to the Tory Party which began in the 1980s. By 1996 he had lent the party £4 million in an interest free loan, and in the 1996 New Year Honours was given a knighthood. John Prescott, then in opposition called it "the crudest example yet of honours given for financial services to the Tory Party". Kirkham responded that the honour was for his charitable work for The Duke of Edinburgh's Award and the Animal Health Trust. In September 1996 Kirkham told The Daily Telegraph that his donations were not "anything at all like that sort of magnitude", and that the £4m had in fact been a loan to the party from his son Michael which was repaid a few weeks later. Kirkham gave £200,000 to Prince Edward's Ardent TV company in 1994 because he had "a burning desire to succeed".

On 23 July 1999, Kirkham was made a life peer as Baron Kirkham, of Old Cantley in the County of South Yorkshire. He was one of the working peers recommended by then Tory leader William Hague, who had borrowed Kirkham's helicopter for electioneering.

== Charity ==
Kirkham has given modestly to charity, allocating grants totalling £455,000 in 1998/99. Among his charitable donations made mainly via the Graham Kirkham Foundation, Kirkham gave £225,000 to help cancer research by Bradford University, had a gallery named after him at the River and Rowing Museum in Henley on Thames, and is also Deputy Patron and a member of the board of Outward Bound trustees. Kirkham is also the Chairman of Trustees and a very active supporter of The Duke of Edinburgh's Award (DofE) in the UK. Kirkham is also the president of The Friendly Band, Sowerby Bridge.

Kirkham was appointed Commander of the Royal Victorian Order (CVO) in the 2001 Birthday Honours for services to the Duke of Edinburgh's Award and the Outward Bound Trust and Knight Commander of the Royal Victorian Order (KCVO) in the 2021 Birthday Honours for services to the Duke of Edinburgh's Award.

== Personal life ==
Kirkham married Pauline Fisher in 1965. The couple have two children.

Kirkham has two houses in his native South Yorkshire, one in Cadeby Road, Sprotbrough; and Grade II*-listed Georgian mansion Cantley Hall which he bought in 1990 from motor dealer John Carnell. Neighbours complained about both a wall Kirkham built to protect his privacy, as well as the noise from a 1998 fireworks party at which the singer was Elaine Paige.

Kirkham furnishes his homes using DFS sofas, as well as old master paintings including John Constable's View of the Stour (bought for £6.7m) and Thomas Gainsborough's Peasants Going To Market (bought for £3.5m). In 1997 Kirkham lent works by Édouard Manet and Orazio Gentileschi to the Getty Center in Brentwood, Los Angeles.

Kirkham has long been interested in dogs, and owns Dalmatians. He has been a Kennel Club member since 1995 and while he owned DFS, it was the main sponsor of Crufts for its show in 2010. He is President of Driffield Agricultural Society and is always present on the last day of the championship dog show to make all the main presentations.

With Lord Harris of Peckham, he is co-owner of the "Hello" horses: Hello Sanctos, Hello Mr President, Hello M'Lady, Hello Sailor, Hello Unique and Hello Boyo, which are ridden by Scott Brash.

In April 2008, Kirkham was involved in an altercation with another motorist in an alleged road rage incident. Charges of assault occasioning actual bodily harm were subsequently brought against him. In court in December 2008, Kirkham denied the charges, and claimed that while he was "not proud" of what had happened, it was he who had been the victim of a road rage attack. Kirkham was cleared of all charges after a three-day trial.

== Awards ==
- 1995 – Knighthood
- 1995 – Honorary Member of Emmanuel College, Cambridge
- 1997 – Honorary Fellow of the Animal Health Trust
- 1997 – Honorary Doctorate from Bradford University
- 1999 – made a Life Peer as Baron Kirkham
- 2001 – CVO
- 2004 – Yorkshire Television accolade of "Yorkshire Man of the Year"
- 2021 – KCVO
- 2023 – Awarded the Freedom of the City of Doncaster

=== Arms ===
Coat of arms of Graham Kirkham, Baron Kirkham
Coronet A Coronet of a Baron Crest A Dalmatian sejant Argent semy of Roundels Vert gorged with a Plain Collar attached thereto a Chain reflexed over the back and grasping in the sinister paw a Horseshoe reversed Or Escutcheon Argent on each of three Chevronnels interlaced their apexes terminating in a Trefoil Vert a Chevronel Or Supporters On either side a Chameleon that on the dexter Vert eyed and gorged with a Plain Collar attached thereto a Chain reflexed over the back and terminating in a Ring Or and that on the sinister Or eyed and gorged with a Plain Collar attached thereto a Chain reflexed over the back and terminating in a Ring Vert Motto Per Laborem Ad Honorem Badge A Cross Bottony surmounted by and conjoined to a Roundel Vert charged with a Roundel Argent thereon a Boar's Head caboshed Vert armed Or

Orders of precedence in the United Kingdom
Preceded by The Lord Watson of Richmond	Gentlemen; Baron Kirkham	Followed by The Lord Grabiner
