= Bessacarr =

Area of Doncaster, South Yorkshire, England

Coordinates: 53.506°N 1.080°W

- Suburb
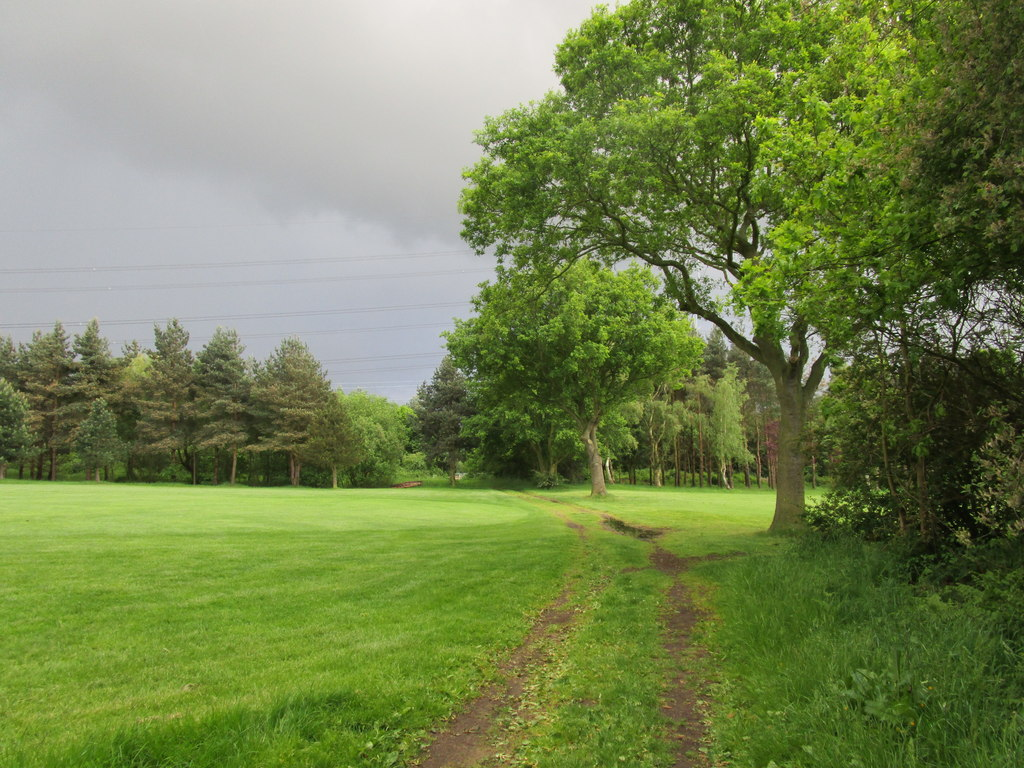
- Footpath across Warren Golf Course, Bessacarr

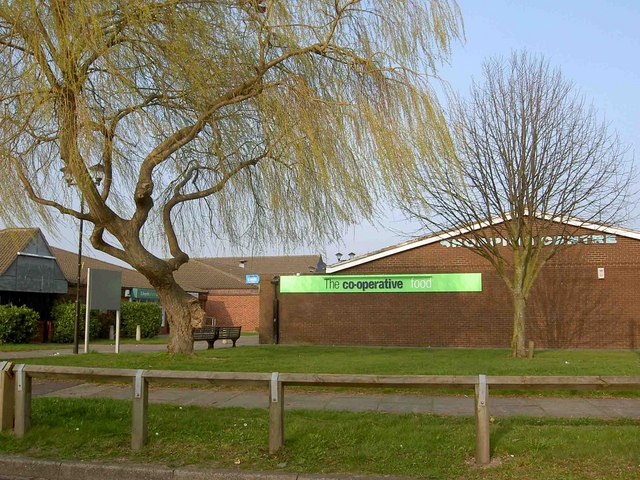
- Stoops Lane shopping parade

- Location within Borough of Doncaster Location within South Yorkshire
- Population: 19,803
- OS grid reference: SE6101
  - London: 140 mi (230 km) S by SE
- Metropolitan borough: Doncaster
- Metropolitan county: South Yorkshire
- Region: Yorkshire and the Humber
- Country: England
- Sovereign state: United Kingdom
- Post town: DONCASTER
- Postcode district: DN4
- Dialling code: 01302
- Police: South Yorkshire
- Fire: South Yorkshire
- Ambulance: Yorkshire
- UK Parliament: Doncaster Central

Bessacarr (/ˈbɛsəkər/) is a suburb on the south-east edge of Doncaster, South Yorkshire, England. Consisting of mostly private residential development from the 1960s onward, it also contains some of the most expensive property in Doncaster, around St Wildfrid's Road and Warning Tongue Lane. It is largely interwoven with Cantley to the north-east having partially signposted ancient boundaries, upon which its population was 19,803 at the 2001 census.

The Bessacarr and Cantley ward within the Metropolitan Borough of Doncaster had a population of 14,408 at the 2011 census, although this includes most of Cantley and Lakeside, and does not include Bessacarr Grange.

== Localities ==
=== West Bessacarr ===
The bulk of Bessacarr is often known as West Bessacarr and is south of Bawtry Road. A small minority of the neighbourhood was built in the 1930s or earlier, the majority of the building occurred in the 1960s and 70s. Some recent development has occurred in the late 1990s and into the 21st century. Apartments are a feature of the most recent developments.

Nostell Place includes a Doctor's surgery, veterinary surgery, pharmacist, Co-Operative food store, bakery, hairdresser, hardware store, fish and chip shop and Chinese takeaway amongst others. Nearby is the Flying Childers public house, St Francis of Assisi Anglican Church, Bessacarr Library and Willow Primary School. Some other shops, including an off-licence and a hairdresser / beautician, are further up Alston Road around the corner from Toby Carvery. Doncaster Lawn Tennis Club is on Saxton Avenue and is accessible via a footpath from Ellers Road.

West Bessacarr is part of the cycle path from Doncaster to Rossington, known locally as "the red path" owing to the colour of its tarmac. Routes including the red path and others within Bessacarr can lead walkers and cyclists to the developed area known as Lakeside. Public transport to and from Bessacarr is provided by First Mainline route 59, with the direct 89 bus through the estates being withdrawn in 2004. Primary education for the area is provided by the excellent Bessacarr Primary School including its own nursery and by another called Willow Primary School, both of which feed into the local Hall Cross lower school, formally Ellers Middle School, next to the north-west boundary.

=== Bessacarr Grange ===
Bessacarr Grange is a largely 1990s neighbourhood south of the M18 motorway with some of its own amenities including Yorkshire Wildlife Park.

== Politics ==
Bessacarr is currently the name of the ward which as such undergoes boundary and name reviews every eight to twelve years theoretically to avoid malapportionment. For the 2021 term the ward is served by a team of two local Conservative councillors and one Labour councillor. Finningley ward would on a historic synthesis and real-politik critique of the first past the post system be considered a set of three Conservative 'safe seats' and currently includes all bar the latest developed areas of Cantley as well as Bessacarr Grange.

== Demography ==
2011 Published Statistics: Population, home ownership and extracts from Physical Environment, surveyed in 2005
Output area	Homes owned outright	Owned with a loan	Socially rented	Privately rented	Other	km² green spaces	km² roads	km² water	km² domestic gardens	km² domestic buildings	km² non-domestic buildings	Usual residents	km²
Bessacarr and Cantley ward	2,338	2,085	898	876	130	2.76	0.69	0.21	1.90	0.46	0.08	14,408	6.72

Around 40% of Bessacarr is in Finningley Ward which had the following land use and housing statistics in 2011:

2011 Published Statistics: Population, home ownership and extracts from Physical Environment, surveyed in 2005
Output area	Homes owned outright	Owned with a loan	Socially rented	Privately rented	Other	km² green spaces	km² roads	km² water	km² domestic gardens	km² domestic buildings	km² non-domestic buildings	Usual residents	km²
Finningley ward	2,633	2,407	435	605	110	38.64	1.04	0.64	2.42	0.61	0.14	15,209	43.42

== Notable people ==
- Louis Tomlinson, singer (One Direction)

== See also ==
- Listed buildings in Doncaster (Bessacarr Ward)
- Church of St Francis of Assisi, West Bessacarr
