= Golf Grand Slam (video game) =

1991 video game

- North American cover art
- Developer: Tose
- Publishers: JP: Hect; NA: Atlus
- Platform: Nintendo Entertainment System
- Release: JP: January 31, 1991; NA: December 1991
- Genre: Sports
- Modes: Single-player, multiplayer

Golf Grand Slam (Note: Japanese: ゴルフ グランドスラム, Hepburn: Gorufu Gurando Suramu) is a 1991 golf simulation game for the Nintendo Entertainment System. It features all the small details of real golf, such as wind, angle at which the ball is hit, etc. The game uses a password feature and up to four people can play.

== Gameplay ==
There are three options to play: tournament mode allows the player to play a normal tournament and there are two modes to train in. It is one of the most detailed golf games for the NES.
