= Grand Slam of Show Jumping =

Major equestrian competitions

The Rolex Grand Slam of Show Jumping is an initiative which unites the four Major tournaments:

- The CHIO Aachen, Germany (Stadium, footing: grass)
- The CSIO Spruce Meadows 'Masters' Tournament in Calgary, Alberta, Canada (Stadium, footing: grass)
- The CHI de Genève in Switzerland (Indoor arena, footing: sand)
- The Dutch Masters in 's-Hertogenbosch in Netherlands (Indoor arena, footing: sand) (as of 2018)

In order to win the Grand Slam, a rider has to win the Grand Prix at the four shows in direct succession. On 13 September 2015, Scott Brash became the first rider to ever win the Grand Slam. With Hello Sanctos, he consecutively won the three Majors at the CHI Geneva 2014, the CHIO Aachen 2015 and Spruce Meadows “Masters” Calgary 2015.

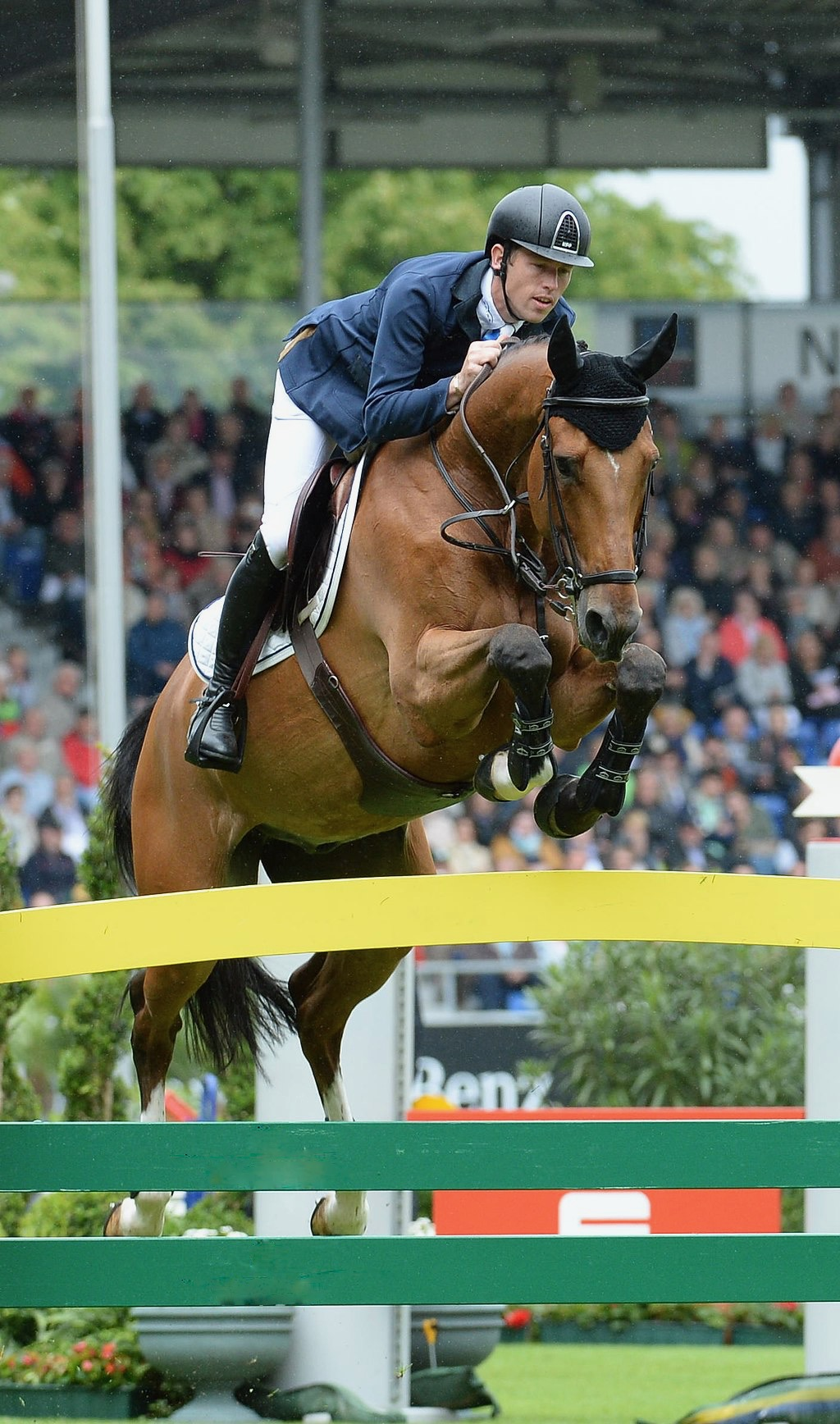
Scott Brash is the only rider in the world who won the Grand Slam.

== Foundation ==
=== The four Majors united ===
Together with Rolex, the organisers of the CHIO Aachen, the CSIO Spruce Meadows “Masters” and the CHI Geneva developed the Grand Slam of Show Jumping. It is based on the world-famous tennis and golf Grand Slams – a successful concept that didn’t exist in the field of show jumping hitherto, although it must be stated that the three equestrian shows have been highly appreciated by the riders for decades because of their unique tradition and excellent quality. Together they unite 250 years of sporting history. They are attended by 900,000 visitors and 1,300 media representatives in total every year.

In 2018, The Dutch Masters of Den Bosch (NED) became the fourth Grand Slam event.

=== Sponsor ===
Rolex is the founding and title sponsor of the Grand Slam.

=== Presentation to the public and to the media ===
The Grand Slam of Show Jumping was presented to the public and to the media in Gothenburg, Sweden on April 26, 2013 – accompanied by the remark that there is the option of increasing the number of participating equestrian sport events up to five in total. The announcement regarding the addition of the Dutch Masters was done in Den Bosch on March 12, 2017.

=== Young talent ===
Two young riders are invited to each of the four Majors.

=== Steering Committee ===
The Steering committee is composed of the organisers of the four Majors of the Rolex Grand Slam of Show Jumping. The actual president of the Steering Committee is Linda Southern-Heathcott from Spruce Meadows

== The four Majors of the Grand Slam ==
=== The CHIO Aachen, Germany ===
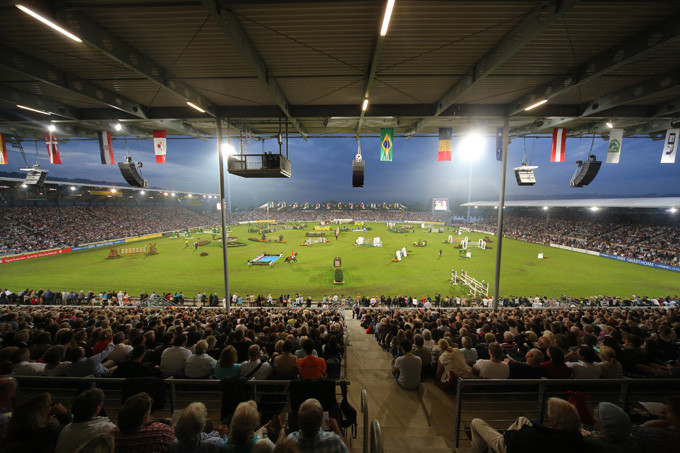
The Arena of the CHIO Aachen

==== Key Facts ====
Date of the event	22nd of May - 24th of May 2026
Foundation year	1898
Spectators	350'001
Footing	Grass, outdoor arena
Number of journalists	600
Total prize-money	€2.73 mil.

=== The CSIO Spruce Meadows “Masters” in Calgary, Alberta, Canada ===
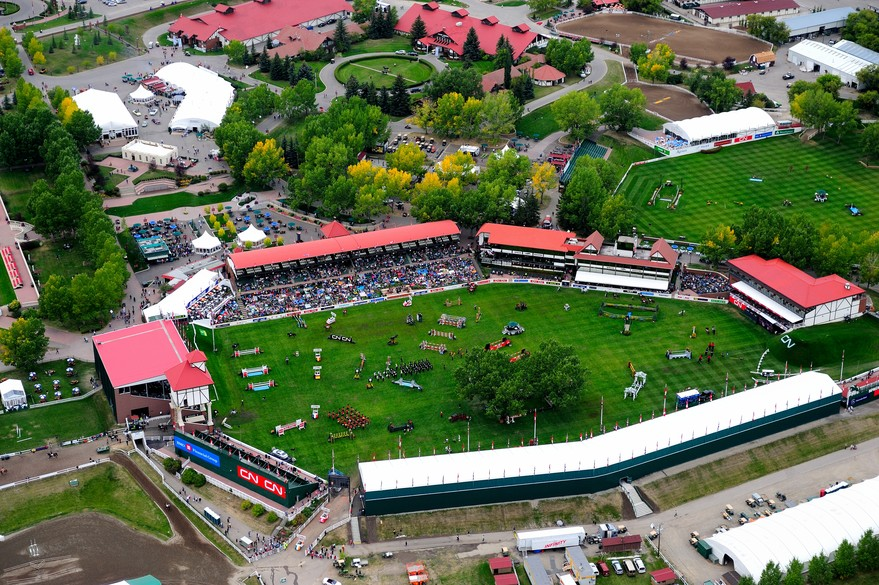
The complex of the Spruce Meadows Masters

==== Key Facts ====
Date of the event	September 9-13, 2026
Foundation year	1976
Spectators	500,000 per year, 200,000 per “Masters”
Footing	Grass, outdoor arena
Number of journalists	400
Total prize-money	4.31 mil. Canadian Dollars

=== The CHI Geneva, Switzerland ===
Founded in 1926. The organisers of the CHI Geneva also organised Switzerland’s first and only Indoor Cross competition. Some of the biggest names in the eventing sport competed at the premiere in the year 2014. The only Swiss World Cup leg in four-in-hand driving is also staged in Geneva. Every year, 700 volunteers help at the event, which attracts 43,000 spectators over the four days. More than 220 media representatives are present at the Palexpo, around 30 TV channels from all five continents broadcast coverage of the event.

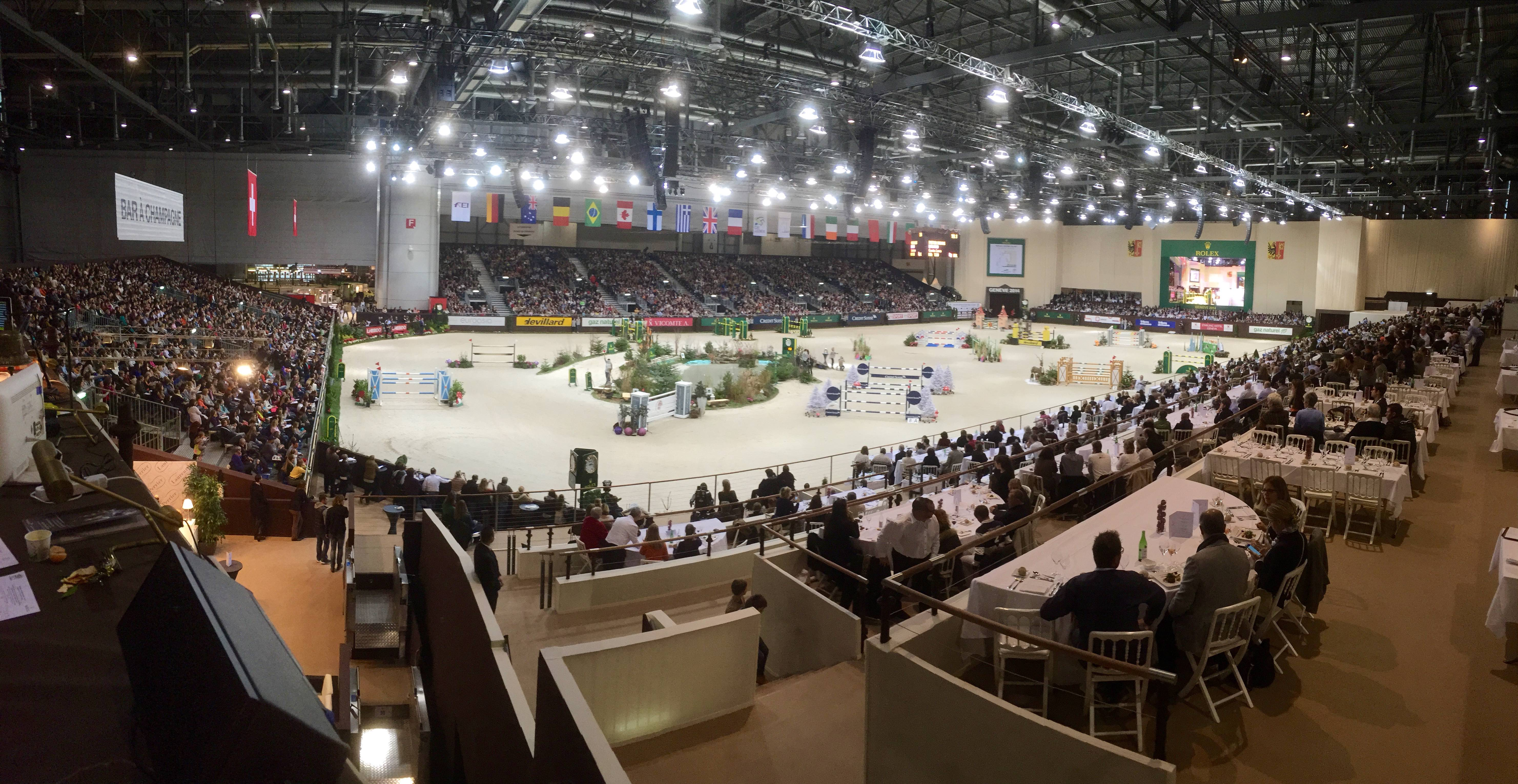
The huge arena of the CHI Geneva

==== Key Facts ====
Date of the event	December 9-13, 2026
Foundation year	1926
Spectators	43’000
Footing	Sand, indoor arena
Number of journalists	220
Total prize-money	2.4 mil. euros

=== The Dutch Masters in 's-Hertogenbosch, Netherlands ===
The Dutch Masters is the most important show in Netherlands. In 1994, the World Cup Final of show jumping was staged in Den Bosch for the first time, in 2012 the Dutch Masters, indeed hosted the Finals for both dressage and jumping. Every year, 65,000 visitors attend the traditional show in the heart of the Netherlands which has celebrated its 50th anniversary in 2017.

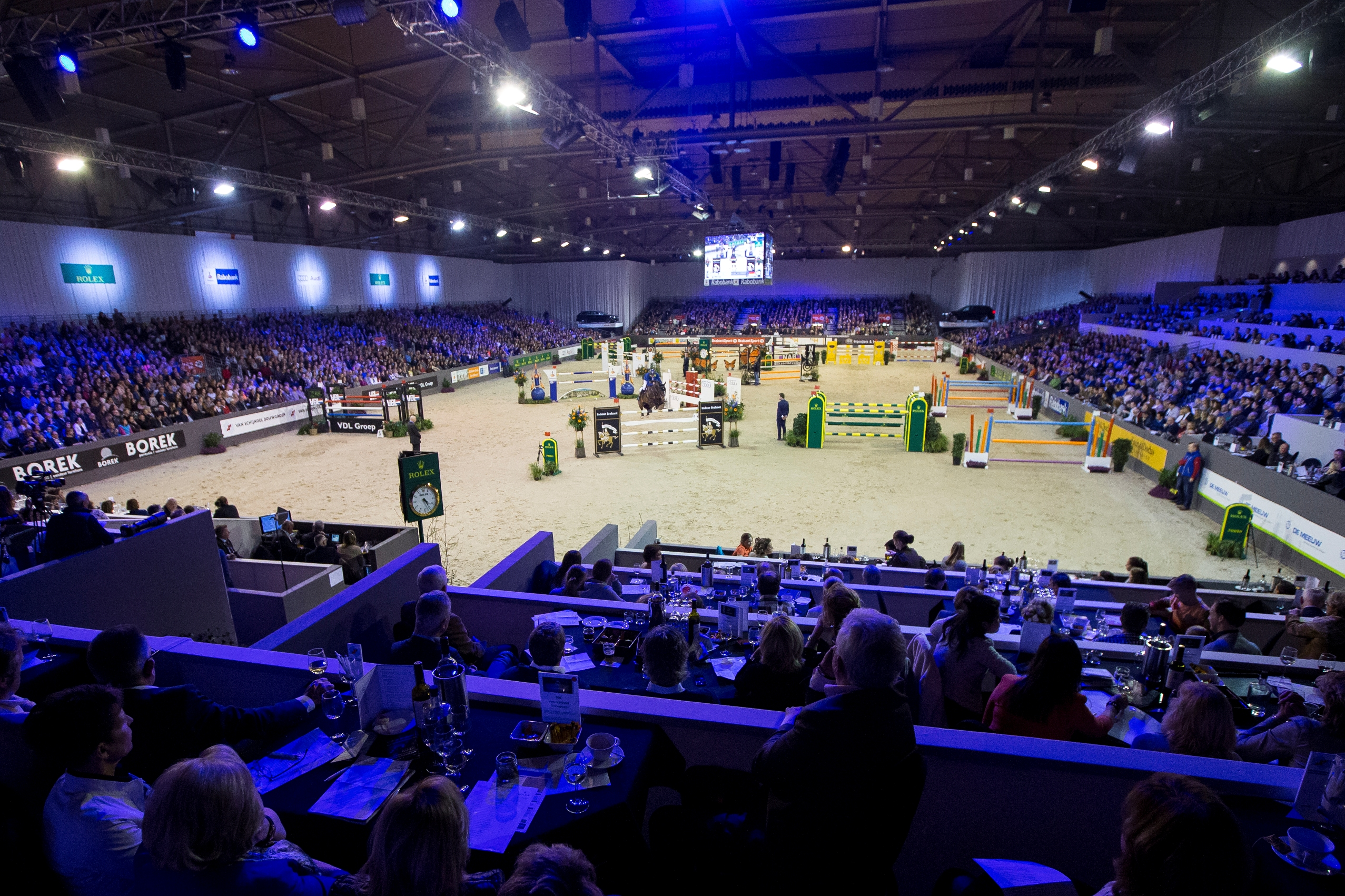
Dutch Masters Den Bosch

==== Key Facts ====
Date of the event	March 12-15, 2026
Foundation year	1967
Spectators	65'000
Footing	Sand, indoor
Number of journalists	200
Total prize-money	1.2 million Euros

== Financial facts and bonus ==
The financial framework conditions of the World Equestrian Festival, CHIO Aachen, the Spruce Meadows “Masters“ and the CHI Geneva are impressive.

The overall prize-money of the three Rolex Grand Prix totals more than 3 mil. Euros. Furthermore, there is a chance to win the following bonuses:

- If a rider wins the Grand Slam (victory in all four Grand Prix in succession), he receives a bonus of 2 million Euros.
- If a rider wins three Grand Prix in succession, he receives a bonus of 1 million Euros.
- If a rider wins two Grand Prix in succession, he receives a bonus of 500,000 Euros.
- If a rider wins two Grand Prix in the same cycle (“two out of three mode”), he receives a bonus of 250,000 Euros.

A rider can compete in the Grand Prix with different horses. The rider’s “personal” Grand Slam starts with the first victory, the calendar year is not decisive here. The cycle of the Rolex Grand Slam of Show Jumping is infinite. A rider has to take part in all three legs of the cycle in order to qualify for a bonus.

== The winners of the Grand Slam competitions so far ==
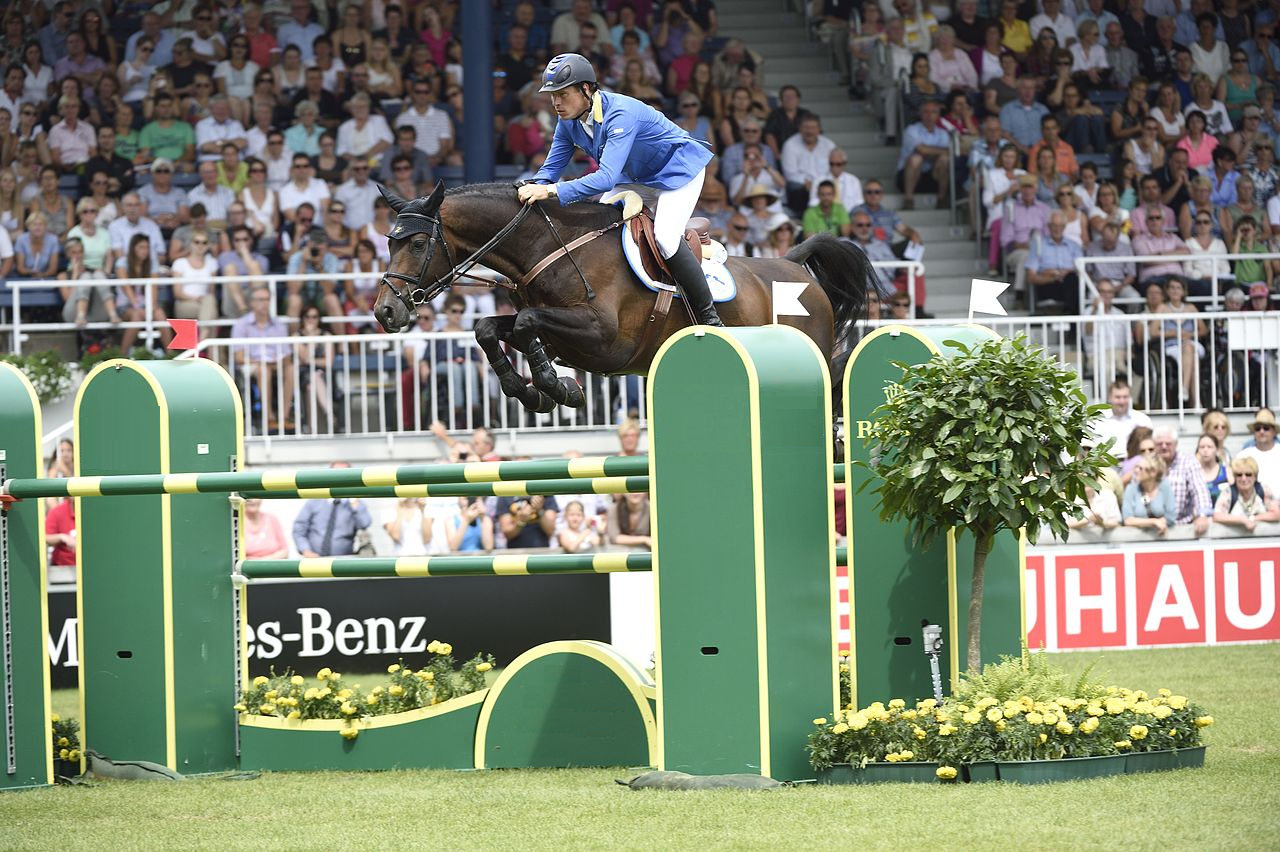
Christian Ahlmann and Codex One, winner of the CHIO Aachen 2014

=== CHIO Aachen ===
- 2013 : Nick Skelton (GBR) and Big Star
- 2014 : Christian Ahlmann (GER) and Codex One
- 2015 : Scott Brash (GBR) and Hello Sanctos
- 2016 : Philipp Weishaupt (GER) and L.B. Convall
- 2017 : Grégory Wathelet (BEL) and Corée
- 2018 : Marcus Ehning (GER) and Prêt à Tout
- 2019 : Kent Farrington (USA) and Gazelle
- 2021 : Daniel Deusser (GER) and Killer Queen VDM
- 2022 : Gerrit Nieberg (GER) and Ben 431
- 2023 : Marcus Ehning (GER) and Stargold
- 2024 : André Thieme (GER) and DSP Chakaria
- 2025 : Martin Fuchs (SUI) and Leone Jei
- 2026 : Richard Vogel(GER) and United Touch S

=== Spruce Meadows « Masters » Calgary ===
- 2013 : Pieter Devos (BEL) and Candy
- 2014 : Ian Millar (CAN) and Dixson
- 2015 : Scott Brash (GBR) and Hello Sanctos
- 2016 : Scott Brash (GBR) and Ursula
- 2017 : Philipp Weishaupt (GER) and L.B. Convall
- 2018 : Sameh El Dahan (EGY) and Suma's Zorro
- 2019 : Beezie Madden (USA) and Darry Lou

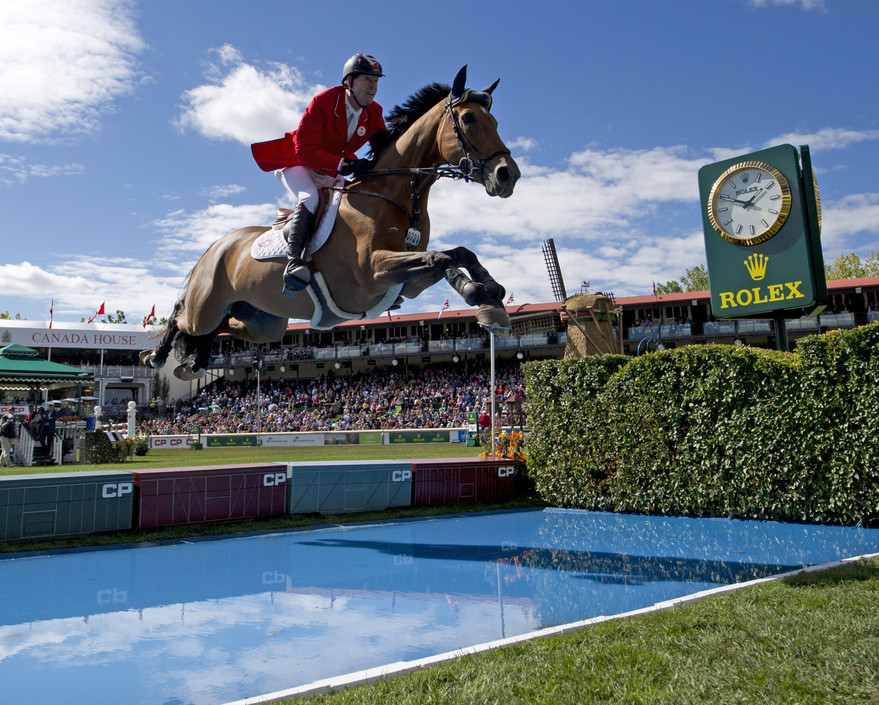
Ian Millar and Dixson, Spruce Meadows "Masters" 2014

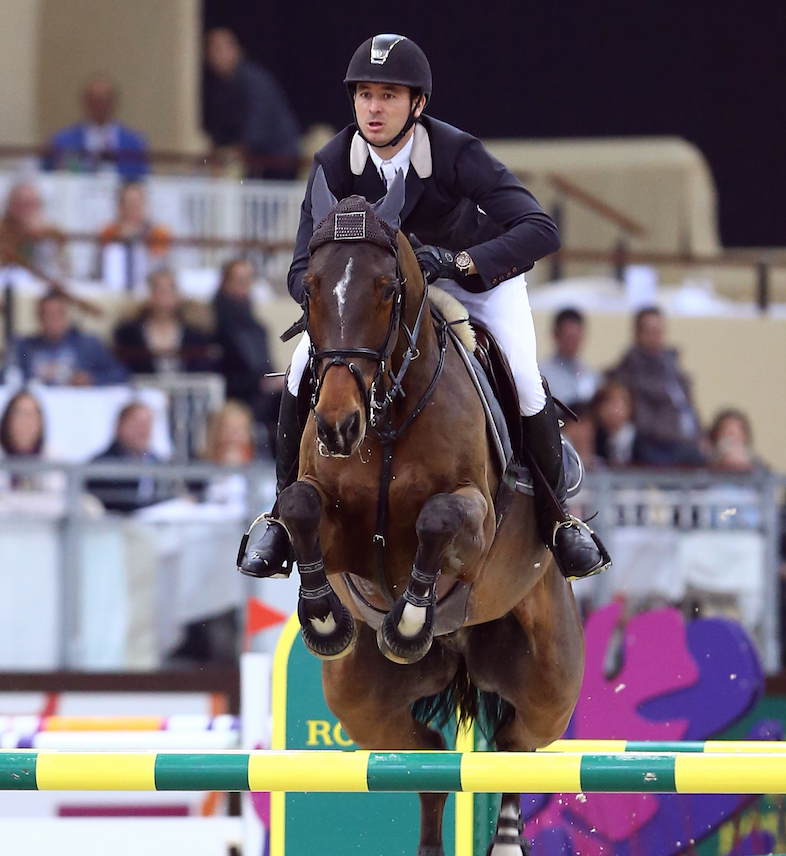
The olympic champion 2012 Steve Guerdat winner of the Grand Slam 2013 in Geneva with Nino des Buissonnets

- 2021 : Steve Guerdat (SUI) and Venard de Cerisy
- 2022 : Daniel Deusser (GER) and Killer Queen VDM
- 2023 : Martin Fuchs (SUI) and Leone Jei
- 2024 : Martin Fuchs (SUI) and Leone Jei
- 2025 : Scott Brash (GBR) and Hello Jefferson

=== CHI Geneva ===
- 2013 : Steve Guerdat (SUI) and Nino des Buissonnets
- 2014 : Scott Brash (GBR) and Hello Sanctos
- 2015 : Steve Guerdat (SUI) and Nino des Buissonnets
- 2016 : Pedro Veniss (BRA) and Quabri de l'Isle
- 2017 : Kent Farrington (USA) and Gazelle
- 2018 : Marcus Ehning (GER) and Prêt à Tout
- 2019 : Martin Fuchs (SUI) and Clooney 51
- 2021 : Martin Fuchs (SUI) and Leone Jei
- 2022 : McLain Ward (USA) and HH Azur
- 2023 : Richard Vogel (GER) and United Touch S
- 2024 : Harrie Smolders (NED) and Monaco
- 2025 : Kent Farrington (USA) and Greya

=== The Dutch Masters ===
- 2018 : Niels Bruynseels (BEL) and Gancia de Muze
- 2019 : Henrik von Eckermann (SWE) and Toveks Mary Lou
- 2021 : Max Kühner (AUT) and Electric Blue P
- 2022 : Daniel Deusser (GER) and Scuderia 1918 Tobago Z
- 2023 : McLain Ward (USA) and HH Azur
- 2024 : Willem Greve (NED) and Highway TN N.O.P.
- 2025 : Simon Delestre (FRA) and Cayman Jolly Jumper
- 2026 : Richard Vogel (GER) and United Touch S

== The trophy of the Grand Slam of Show Jumping ==
The trophy of the Rolex Grand Slam, a cup made out of sterling silver with double scrolled handles was designed by the famous London jewellers Garrard that was founded in 1735. Standing on a silver plinth, a delicate ribbed spiral stem curves around the middle section moving up towards a tulip-shaped vessel with a lid. The overall height of the trophy is 45 cm and it weighs 2 kilogrammes. The front of the trophy is decorated with the logo of the Rolex Grand Slam, which was hand engraved. The trophy was designed by Corinna Pike, designer of the royal crown jewels.
