= Scott Brash =

British show jumping rider

Scott Brash MBE
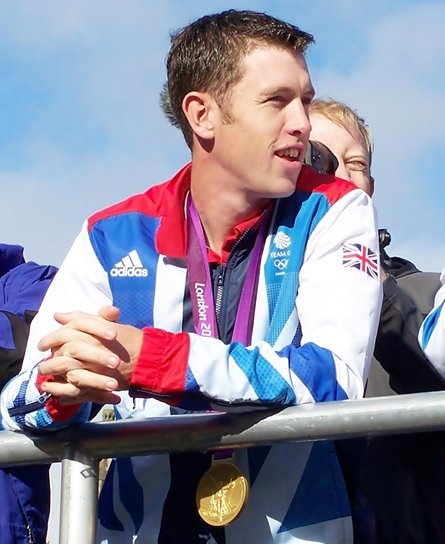
- Brash in 2012

Personal information
- Full name: Scott Brash
- Nationality: Scottish
- Born: 23 November 1985 (age 40) Peebles, Peeblesshire, Scotland
- Website: scottbrashequestrian.co.uk

Sport
- Country: Great Britain
- Sport: Show jumping
- Team: GB

Achievements and titles
- Olympic finals: London 2012
- Highest world ranking: 1
Medal record
Equestrian
Representing Great Britain
Olympic Games
Gold medal – first place	2012 London	Team jumping
Gold medal – first place	2024 Paris	Team jumping
World Championships
Bronze medal – third place	2026 Aachen	Team jumping
Bronze medal – third place	2022 Herning	Team jumping
European Championships
Gold medal – first place	2013 Herning	Team Jumping
Silver medal – second place	2025 A Coruna	Individual Jumping
Bronze medal – third place	2013 Herning	Individual Jumping
Bronze medal – third place	2019 Rotterdam	Team Jumping
World Cup
Bronze medal – third place	2014 Lyon	Individual jumping

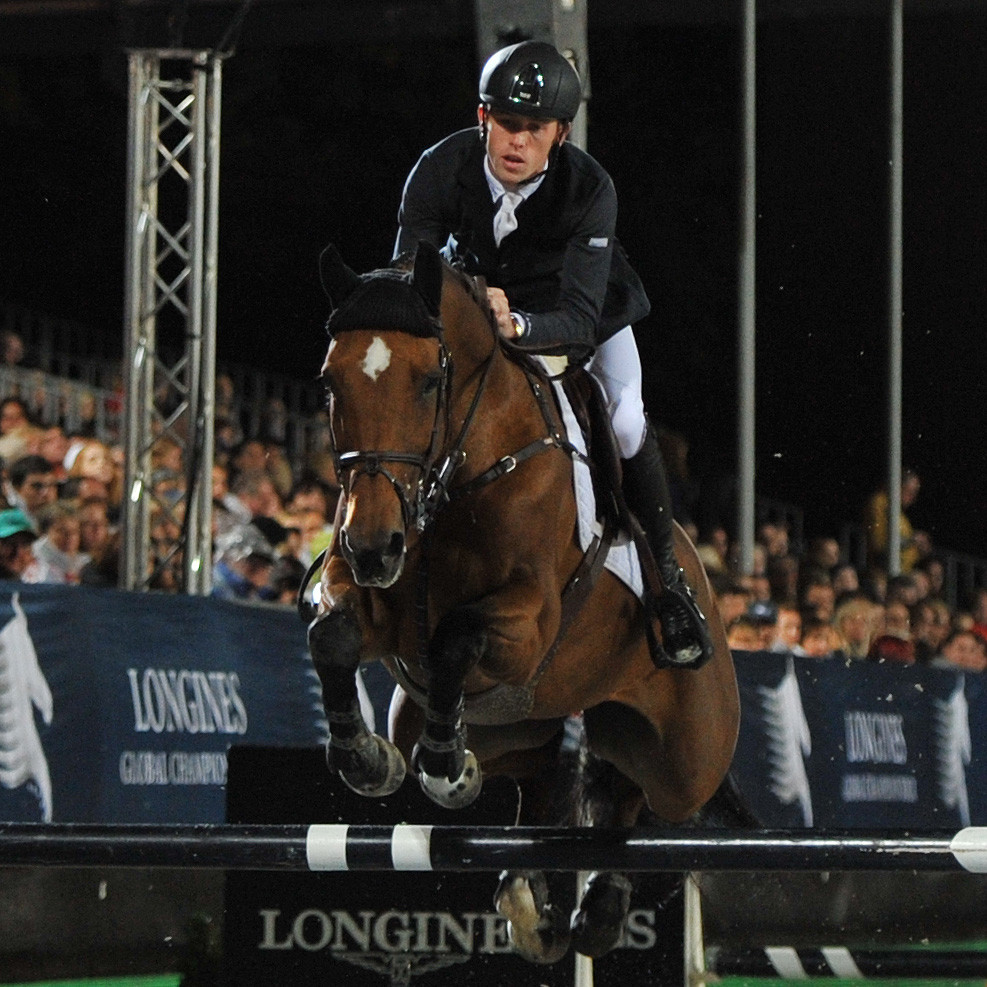
Scott Brash with Ursula XII in 2013

Scott Brash MBE (born 23 November 1985) is a Scottish showjumper. He began riding the horse Hello Sanctos in early 2012. They competed as part of the British Team at the 2012 Summer Olympics in London winning a gold medal in the team jumping event. In 2015, he became the first rider to win show jumping's Rolex Grand Slam, all three of the sport's most prestigious events in a single year, earning the sport's biggest individual prize of €1 million (£735,000).

In September 2025 Scott won the Spruce Meadows Rolex Master €5million GP at the 50th anniversary show of Spruce Meadows taking home a €1.6 million Canadian dollar prize. He is the only rider the win the Spruce Meadows Masters three times and has now won a prestigious five Rolex Grand Slams.

== Early life ==
Brash was born in Peebles, Scotland, and is the son of a builder. He attended Newlands Primary School and Peebles High School as a child, and at seven years old, he began riding his own pony. At the age of ten he began show jumping in The Pony Club.

== Career ==
Scott Brash achieve his first important results around 2010 with Intertoy Z. Among the best appearances, there are 2010 FEI World Equestrian Games, CSIO5* Nations Cup, Dublin and Aachen 2011.

Brash won the World Cup Grand Prix in Florida in March 2012 during the run up to the 2012 Summer Olympics, winning the prize fund of $60,000. He placed ahead of Richard Spooner in second and Kent Farrington in third. In May he was part of the British team that finished sixth at the Rome Nations Cup in May 2012. He was named as part of Great Britain's show jumping team for the 2012 Olympics along with Nick Skelton, Ben Maher and Peter Charles.

At the London 2012 Summer Olympics, Brash and Hello Sanctos won a gold medal as part of the British show jumping team. They finished fifth in the individual competition.

Brash was appointed Member of the Order of the British Empire (MBE) in the 2013 New Year Honours for services to equestrianism. That year, Brash and Hello Sanctos won the team gold and individual bronze medal at the Herning European Show Jumping Championships. In November 2013, on the day of his 28th birthday, Brash won the last event of the 2013 Global Champions Tour, the Doha Grand Prix, and secured himself the overall championship. In 2014, with Hello Sanctos, he won the Top 10 competition and the Rolex Grand Prix in Palexpo, Geneva.

In May 2015, Brash and Hello Sanctos won the Rolex Grand Prix titles in Aachen, Germany, Geneva, Switzerland, Spruce Meadows, Calgary, Alberta, Canada, the sport's three most prestigious annual events. This made him the first rider to win the Rolex Grand Slam and show jumping's biggest individual prize of 1m Euros (£735,000).

Scott Brash won three legs of the Longines Global Champions Tour in 2015, including Miami Beach and Cascais (Estoril) with Hello Sanctos, and Monaco with Hello M'Lady. In 2017, Brash was disqualified from a Global Champions League event in Portugal after traces of blood were found on his horse Hello Forever. The controversial disqualification led to a push by some in the showjumping community to soften enforcement of the so-called 'blood rule.'

In 2018, Brash won the London Grand Prix of the Longines Global Champions Tour, seeing his total of LGCT Grands Prix victories reach eleven; the highest number held by any rider since the Tour was founded in 2006.

Brash remains close to the top of the Longines World Rankings as he has since his last Olympic appearance in 2012. Brash is currently the world number #4 rider.

== Honors ==
- Designated Member of the Order of the British Empire by Queen Elizabeth in 2013;
- Engaged into The British Horse Society Equestrian Hall of Fame in 2015;

== International championship results ==
Results
Year	Event	Horse	Placing	Notes
2010	World Equestrian Games	Hello Intertoy Z	9th	Team
2010	World Equestrian Games	Hello Intertoy Z	37th	Individual
2012	Olympic Games	Hello Sanctos	1st place, gold medalist(s)	Team
2012	Olympic Games	Hello Sanctos	5th	Individual
2013	European Championships	Hello Sanctos	1st place, gold medalist(s)	Team
2013	European Championships	Hello Sanctos	3rd place, bronze medalist(s)	Individual
2014	World Cup Final	Ursula XII	3rd place, bronze medalist(s)	individual
2014	World Equestrian Games	Hello Sanctos	18th	Team
2014	World Equestrian Games	Hello Sanctos	49th	Individual
2019	European Championships	Hello M'Lady	3rd place, bronze medalist(s)	Team
2019	European Championships	Hello M'Lady	36th	Individual
EL = Eliminated; RET = Retired; WD = Withdrew

== Horses ==
Brash's top horse was Hello Sanctos. Together they won Team Gold at the London 2012 Olympic Games. They have had many other successes together including the Rolex Grand Slam, the Global Champions Tour in 2013 and 2014, several LGCT Grand Prix wins and many times through to the top 18. Another important horse in Brash's career was Ursula XII, a mare officially retired from competition in 2018 at Olympia London International Horse Show. Hello Forever took part of his stable for few years and the two won lots of international and global competitions.

Brash's up-coming horses include Hello Mr President, Hello Jefferson, Hello Senator, Hello Vittoria, Hello Shelby and Hello Vincent.

The horses are owned by Lord and Lady Harris of Peckham and Lord and Lady Kirkham.

== See also ==
- 2012 Summer Olympics and Paralympics gold post boxes
