= Richard Vogel (equestrian) =

German equestrian

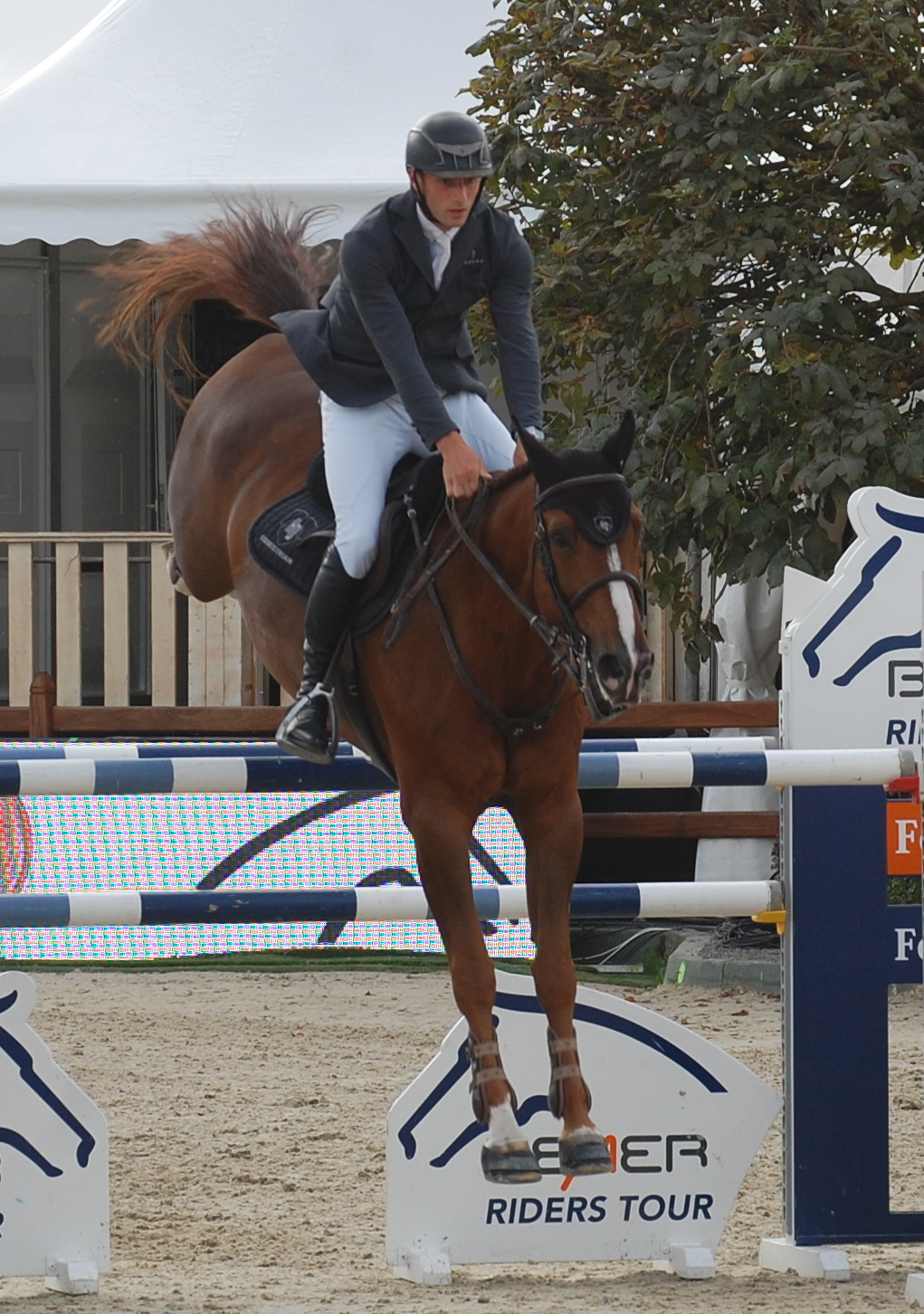
- Vogel and Darius de Kezeg Z (2021)

Personal information
- Full name: Richard Franz Vogel
- Nationality: German
- Discipline: Show jumping
- Born: 24 March 1997 (age 29); Mannheim, Germany
Medal record
Equestrian
Representing Germany
World Championships
| Gold medal – first place | 2026 Aachen | Team jumping |
European Championships
| Gold medal – first place | 2025 La Coruña | Individual jumping |
| Bronze medal – third place | 2025 La Coruña | Team jumping |

Richard Franz Vogel (born 24 March 1997) is a German equestrian. He competed at the 2023 FEI World Cup Finals in Omaha, Nebraska, finishing 8th in the final. He was also part of the German team which won the FEI Nations Cup Final in Barcelona in 2023.

Vogel has been nominated by the German Equestrian Federation to represent the German team at the 2024 Olympic Games in Paris.
