= DFS (furniture retailer) =

British furniture retailer specialising in sofas

DFS Furniture plc
- Trade name: dfs
- Formerly: Diamond Holdco 1 Limited (2010–2015); DFS Furniture Limited (3–18 February 2015)
- Type: Public limited company
- Traded as: LSE: DFS
- ISIN: GB00BTC0LB89
- Industry: Retail
- Founded: 1969 in Doncaster
- Founder: Graham Kirkham
- Headquarters: Doncaster, United Kingdom
- Area served: United Kingdom; Republic of Ireland
- Key people: Ian Durant (Chairman); Tim Stacey (Chief executive officer)
- Products: Furniture Beds Mattresses
- Revenue: ▲£1,420.1 million (2026)
- Operating income: ▲£75.0 million (2026)
- Net income: ▲£34.9 million (2026)
- Website: dfs.co.uk dfs.ie

DFS Furniture plc, trading as dfs, is a furniture retailer in the United Kingdom and Ireland specialising in sofas and soft furnishings. It is listed on the London Stock Exchange.

== History ==
=== Northern Upholstery ===
In 1969, aged 22, Graham Kirkham was married with two children, which he describes as great motivation.

Having visited a few manufacturers in his daily work, he decided that making furniture was relatively easy and that by cutting out the warehouse dealers in the middle of the supply chain, he could sell direct to the public at lower prices. Kirkham rented a room above a snooker hall in Carcroft, and started making furniture upstairs and retailing it downstairs, calling the business Northern Upholstery.

=== DFS ===
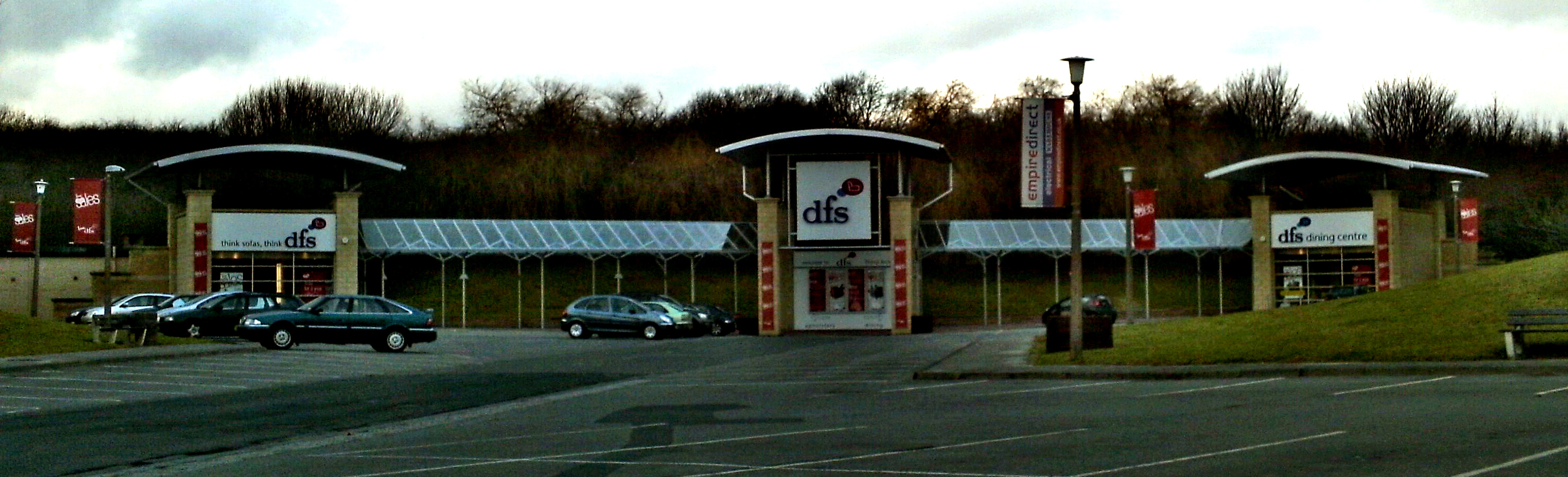
DFS, Wetherby (formerly Northern Upholstery) on the Thorp Arch Trading Estate, West Yorkshire

In 1983, Kirkham purchased the business and the name of the Darley Dale based DFS ("Direct Furnishing Supplies") Limited, founded by the Hardy Family in 1969. Northern Upholstery was renamed DFS (although some branches of Northern Upholstery in Yorkshire retained their original name until the mid-1990s) and at the time, had a total of sixty three stores, employing 2,000 staff.

In 1993, DFS was floated on the stock market as DFS Furniture Company plc and valued at £271 million.

This brought the Kirkham family to the attention of thieves, who in 1994, broke into the family home at Sprotbrough while they were on holiday. The burglars bound and gagged the housekeeper and made off with money and jewels worth £2.4 million, later recovered, but still South Yorkshire's largest armed robbery.

In 1998, DFS announced its first drop in profits in twenty eight years to the London Stock Exchange. The company reworked its advertising to feature younger models, and in 2000, DFS announced a 79 per cent profit increase. But the revival was short lived, and in light of the continuing prevalence for private equity, Kirkham took the chain private again in 2004, leveraging his family's own 9.46% stake with £150 million of family funds in an eventual £496 million deal.

DFS acquired the furniture businesses of Wyefield Group for £1.5 million in June 1999.

Kirkham told the Yorkshire Post: "It's something that's caused me fitful sleep in the time I've been thinking about it. I've no hobby, this is my hobby – it's what I do. I'm an entrepreneur. It's almost as if I can feel the adrenaline running through my veins." On 3 April 2010, it was announced that DFS had been sold to private equity firm Advent International for a reported £500 million.

DFS then acquired its smaller rival, Sofa Workshop, in November 2013.

The company went on to buy Dwell, another competitor which was struggling in the market, in August 2014.

On 6 March 2015, the company floated on the London Stock Exchange again as DFS Furniture plc.

In October 2017, DFS announced they had purchased one of its competitors, Sofology (formerly Sofaworks and CSL) in a £25 million deal. The acquisition was ratified by the Competition and Markets Authority in November 2017.

As of 2024, DFS has ceased trading in Spain.

== Marketing ==
The company has been noted for its sales tactics, which involve attempts to sell added extras to customers. Despite these aggressive marketing strategies, the quality of their products is considered by a joinery expert, Roger Galpin, to be of "fairly robust construction."

For many years in the 1980s and 1990s, actor Tom Adams was the face of DFS's television advertisements.

In December 2008, one television commercial by DFS was banned by the Advertising Standards Authority, following complaints that the company had doctored the footage to inflate the perceived size of their sofas, relative to the actors. The advert featured actors miming Nickelback's "Rockstar", while playing air guitar in front of the sofas.
