= Equestrian at the 2024 Summer Olympics – Individual jumping =

Individual jumping at the Games of the XXXIII Olympiad
- Dates: 5–6 August 2024

Medalists
1st place, gold medalist(s)		Christian Kukuk	Germany
2nd place, silver medalist(s)		Steve Guerdat	Switzerland
3rd place, bronze medalist(s)		Maikel van der Vleuten	Netherlands

The individual show jumping event at the 2024 Summer Olympics took place on 5–6 August 2024.

The event was won by German rider Christian Kukuk, second place was Swiss rider Steve Guerdat, and third was Netherlands rider Maikel van der Vleuten.

== Results ==
=== Qualification ===
The best 30 athletes after the individual qualifier progressed to the individual final.

Rank	Rider	Nation	Horse	Penalties			Time	Notes
Rank	Rider	Nation	Horse	Jump	Time	Total	Time	Notes
1	Julien Epaillard	France	Dubai Du Cedre	0.00	0.00	0.00	73.07	Q
1	Shane Sweetnam	Ireland	James Kann Cruz	0.00	0.00	0.00	73.35	Q
1	Daniel Coyle	Ireland	Legacy	0.00	0.00	0.00	73.64	Q
1	Harrie Smolders	Netherlands	Uricas VD Kattevennen	0.00	0.00	0.00	74.02	Q
1	Martin Fuchs	Switzerland	Leone Jei	0.00	0.00	0.00	74.20	Q
1	Steve Guerdat	Switzerland	Dynamix De Belheme	0.00	0.00	0.00	74.33	Q
1	Henrik von Eckermann	Sweden	King Edward	0.00	0.00	0.00	74.50	Q
1	Emanuele Camilli	Italy	Odense Odeveld	0.00	0.00	0.00	75.10	Q
1	Kim Emmen	Netherlands	Imagine	0.00	0.00	0.00	75.33	Q
1	Abdulrahman Alrajhi	Saudi Arabia	Ventago	0.00	0.00	0.00	75.35	Q
1	Harry Charles	Great Britain	Romeo 88	0.00	0.00	0.00	75.72	WD
1	Scott Brash	Great Britain	Jefferson	0.00	0.00	0.00	75.78	Q
1	Stephan Barcha	Brazil	Primavera	0.00	0.00	0.00	76.03	Q
1	Victoria Gulliksen	Norway	Mistral van de Vogelzang	0.00	0.00	0.00	76.24	Q
1	Gilles Thomas	Belgium	Ermitage Kalone	0.00	0.00	0.00	76.68	Q
1	Karl Cook	United States	Caracole de la Roque	0.00	0.00	0.00	76.97	Q
1	Rodrigo Pessoa	Brazil	Major Tom	0.00	0.00	0.00	77.03	Q
1	Andres Azcarraga	Mexico	Contendros 2	0.00	0.00	0.00	77.21	Q
1	Ramzy Al-Duhami	Saudi Arabia	Untouchable 32	0.00	0.00	0.00	77.48	Q
1	Takashi Haase Shibayama	Japan	Karamell M & M	0.00	0.00	0.00	78.97	Q
21	Omar Al Marzouqi	United Arab Emirates	Enjoy de la Mure	0.00	1.00	1.00	79.56	Q
22	Maikel van der Vleuten	Netherlands	Beauville Z	4.00	0.00	4.00	70.94	Q
22	Grégory Wathelet	Belgium	Bond JamesBond De Hey	4.00	0.00	4.00	71.97	Q
22	Christian Kukuk	Germany	Checker 47	4.00	0.00	4.00	72.00	Q
22	Simon Delestre	France	I Amelusina R 51	4.00	0.00	4.00	72.64	Q
22	Max Kühner	Austria	Elektric Blue P	4.00	0.00	4.00	73.04	Q
22	Laura Kraut	United States	Baloutinue	4.00	0.00	4.00	73.22	Q
22	Ben Maher	Great Britain	Dallas Vegas Batilly	4.00	0.00	4.00	73.24	Q
22	José Maria Larocca	Argentina	Viens Tu De Sey	4.00	0.00	4.00	73.33	Q
22	Philipp Weishaupt	Germany	Zineday	4.00	0.00	4.00	73.42	Q
22	Mario Deslauriers	Canada	Emerson	4.00	0.00	4.00	74.93	Q
32	Rolf-Göran Bengtsson	Sweden	Zuccero HV	4.00	0.00	4.00	75.15	
32	Cian O'Connor	Ireland	Maurice	4.00	0.00	4.00	75.17	
32	McLain Ward	United States	Ilex	4.00	0.00	4.00	75.50	
32	Jérôme Guery	Belgium	Quel Homme De Hus	4.00	0.00	4.00	75.54	
32	Katharina Rhomberg	Austria	Colestus Cambridge	4.00	0.00	4.00	75.55	
32	Erynn Ballard	Canada	Nikka VD Bisschop	4.00	0.00	4.00	76.60	
32	Olivier Perreau	France	Dorai D'Aiguilly	4.00	0.00	4.00	76.94	
32	Ismael García Roque	Spain	Tirano	4.00	0.00	4.00	76.97	
32	Eugenio Garza	Mexico	Contago	4.00	0.00	4.00	77.02	
32	Andreas Schou	Denmark	Napoli VH Nederassenthof	4.00	0.00	4.00	77.11	
42	Robin Muhr	Israel	Galaxy HM	8.00	0.00	8.00	73.46	
42	Peder Fredricson	Sweden	Catch Me Not S	8.00	0.00	8.00	74.50	
42	Hilary Scott	Australia	Milky Way	8.00	0.00	8.00	74.71	
42	Edouard Schmitz	Switzerland	Gamin Van't Naastveldhof	8.00	0.00	8.00	75.02	
42	Khaled Almobty	Saudi Arabia	Jaguar King WD	8.00	0.00	8.00	75.87	
42	Edwina Tops-Alexander	Australia	Fellow Castlefield	8.00	0.00	8.00	76.26	
42	Duarte Seabra	Portugal	Dourados 2	8.00	0.00	8.00	76.27	
42	Federico Fernández	Mexico	Romeo	8.00	0.00	8.00	76.58	
42	Tiffany Foster	Canada	Figor	8.00	0.00	8.00	76.78	
42	Thaisa Erwin	Australia	Hialita B	8.00	0.00	8.00	78.12	
42	Adam Grzegorzewski	Poland	Issem	8.00	0.00	8.00	78.40	
42	Dawid Kubiak	Poland	Flash Blue B	8.00	0.00	8.00	78.63	
54	Taizo Sugitani	Japan	Quincy 194	8.00	1.00	9.00	79.57	
55	Richard Vogel	Germany	United Touch S	12.00	0.00	12.00	70.80	
55	Kristaps Neretnieks	Latvia	Palladium KJV	12.00	0.00	12.00	73.66	
55	Ioli Mytilineou	Greece	L'Artiste De Toxandra	12.00	0.00	12.00	74.32	
55	Maksymilian Wechta	Poland	Chepettano	12.00	0.00	12.00	76.19	
55	Gerfried Puck	Austria	Naxcel V	12.00	0.00	12.00	77.34	
60	Sergio Álvarez Moya	Spain	Puma HS	12.00	1.00	13.00	79.75	
61	Salim Ahmed Al-Suwaidi	United Arab Emirates	Foncetti VD Heffinck	16.00	0.00	16.00	76.42	
62	Yuri Mansur	Brazil	Miss Blue	4.00	15.00	19.00	93.37	
63	Luis Fernando Larrazabal	Venezuela	Condara	20.00	0.00	20.00	74.19	
63	Isabella Russekoff	Israel	C Vier 2	20.00	0.00	20.00	76.13	
65	Agustín Covarrubias	Chile	Nelson Du Petit Vivier	28.00	3.00	31.00	81.68	
66	René Lopez	Colombia	Kheros Van't Hoogeinde	20.00	19.00	39.00	97.59	
	Janakabhorn Karunayadhaj	Thailand	Kinmar Agalu	Eliminated				
	Eduardo Álvarez Aznar	Spain	Caprice Du Vigneul	Retired				
	My Relander	Estonia	Expert	Retired				
	Daniel Bluman	Israel	Ladriano Z	Retired				
	Eiken Sato	Japan	Conthargo-Blue	Retired				
	Andrius Petrovas	Lithuania	Linkolns	Retired				
	Abdulla Al-Marri	United Arab Emirates	McGregor	Retired				
	Amre Hamcho	Syria	Vagabon Des Forets	Withdrawn				

=== Final ===
Rank	Rider	Nation	Horse	Penalties			Time	Notes
Rank	Rider	Nation	Horse	Jump	Time	Total	Time	Notes
=1	Steve Guerdat	Switzerland	Dynamix De Belheme	0.00	0.00	0.00	80.99	Q
=1	Maikel van der Vleuten	Netherlands	Beauville Z	0.00	0.00	0.00	82.06	Q
=1	Christian Kukuk	Germany	Checker 47	0.00	0.00	0.00	82.38	Q
4	Julien Epaillard	France	Dubai Du Cedre	4.00	0.00	4.00	79.18	
5	Stephan Barcha	Brazil	Primavera	4.00	0.00	4.00	80.07	
6	Scott Brash	Great Britain	Jefferson	4.00	0.00	4.00	81.23	
7	Max Kühner	Austria	Elektric Blue P	4.00	0.00	4.00	81.29	
8	Laura Kraut	United States	Baloutinue	4.00	0.00	4.00	81.61	
9	Ben Maher	Great Britain	Dallas Vegas Batilly	4.00	0.00	4.00	81.70	
10	Martin Fuchs	Switzerland	Leone Jei	4.00	0.00	4.00	82.21	
11	Ramzy Al-Duhami	Saudi Arabia	Untouchable 32	4.00	0.00	4.00	82.73	
12	Philipp Weishaupt	Germany	Zineday	4.00	1.00	5.00	84.14	
13	Abdulrahman Alrajhi	Saudi Arabia	Ventago	4.00	2.00	6.00	85.68	
14	Harrie Smolders	Netherlands	Uricas VD Kattevennen	4.00	2.00	6.00	85.75	
15	Grégory Wathelet	Belgium	Bond JamesBond De Hey	8.00	0.00	8.00	78.76	
16	Karl Cook	United States	Caracole de la Roque	8.00	0.00	8.00	79.72	
17	Simon Delestre	France	I Amelusina R 51	8.00	0.00	8.00	81.25	
18	Mario Deslauriers	Canada	Emerson	8.00	0.00	8.00	82.64	
19	Omar Al Marzouqi	United Arab Emirates	Enjoy de la Mure	8.00	0.00	8.00	83.38	
20	Gilles Thomas	Belgium	Ermitage Kalone	8.00	0.00	8.00	83.95	
21	Emanuele Camilli	Italy	Odense Odeveld	12.00	0.00	12.00	81.08	
22	Shane Sweetnam	Ireland	James Kann Cruz	12.00	0.00	12.00	82.03	
23	Kim Emmen	Netherlands	Imagine	12.00	0.00	12.00	83.52	
24	Victoria Gulliksen	Norway	Mistral van de Vogelzang	12.00	1.00	13.00	84.83	
25	José Maria Larocca	Argentina	Viens Tu De Sey	20.00	0.00	20.00	81.82	
	Andres Azcarraga	Mexico	Contendros 2	Eliminated				
	Henrik von Eckermann	Sweden	King Edward	Eliminated				
	Rodrigo Pessoa	Brazil	Major Tom	Retired				
	Daniel Coyle	Ireland	Legacy	Retired				
	Takashi Haase Shibayama	Japan	Karamell M & M	Retired				
Official results

=== Jump-Off ===
Rank	Rider	Nation	Horse	Penalties	Time (s)
1st place, gold medalist(s)	Christian Kukuk	Germany	Checker 47	0	38.34
2nd place, silver medalist(s)	Steve Guerdat	Switzerland	Dynamix De Belheme	4	38.38
3rd place, bronze medalist(s)	Maikel van der Vleuten	Netherlands	Beauville Z	4	39.12
