= Gulliksen =

Gulliksen is a surname. Notable people with the surname include:

- Geir Gulliksen (born 1960), Norwegian show jumper
- Geir Gulliksen (writer) (born 1963), Norwegian poet, novelist, playwright, children's writer, essayist and publisher
- Harold Gulliksen (1903–1996), American psychologist
- Kevin Gulliksen (born 1996), Norwegian handball player
- Rune Gulliksen (born 1963), Norwegian ice hockey player
- Tobias Fjeld Gulliksen (born 2003), football player
- Victoria Gulliksen (born 1992), show jumper

== See also ==
- Ted Gullicksen (1953–2014), American housing rights activist
- Gullickson
- Gullikson
