= Estonia at the 2024 Summer Olympics =

- IOC code: EST
- NOC: Estonian Olympic Committee
- Website: www.eok.ee (in Estonian)

in Paris, France 26 July 2024 – 11 August 2024
- Competitors: 24 (16 men and 8 women) in 13 sports
- Flag bearers (opening): Klen Kristofer Kaljulaid & Reena Pärnat
- Flag bearers (closing): Janek Õiglane & Reena Pärnat
- Medals: Gold 0 Silver 0 Bronze 0 Total 0

Summer Olympics appearances (overview)
- 1920; 1924; 1928; 1932; 1936; 1948–1988; 1992; 1996; 2000; 2004; 2008; 2012; 2016; 2020; 2024

Other related appearances
- Russian Empire (1908–1912); Soviet Union (1952–1988)

Estonia competed at the 2024 Summer Olympics in Paris from 26 July to 11 August 2024. It was the nation's ninth consecutive appearance at the Games since the 1992 Summer Olympics and its fourteenth appearance overall in Summer Olympic history.

For the first time since the 1996 Games, Estonia failed to secure a single medal, with Nelli Differt falling short of her bronze medal in women's épée to finish Estonia's best in 4th.

== Competitors ==
The following is the list of number of competitors in the Games.

Sport	Men	Women	Total
Archery	0	1	1
Athletics	4	1	5
Badminton	0	1	1
Cycling	1	1	2
Equestrian	0	1	1
Fencing	0	1	1
Judo	1	0	1
Rowing	4	0	4
Shooting	2	0	2
Sailing	1	1	2
Swimming	1	1	2
Weightlifting	1	0	1
Wrestling	1	0	1
Total	16	8	24

== Archery ==
One Estonian archer qualified for the women's individual through the 2024 European Continental Qualification Tournament in Essen, Germany.

Athlete	Event	Ranking round		Round of 64	Round of 32	Round of 16	Quarterfinals	Semifinals	Final / BM	
Athlete	Event	Score	Seed	Opposition Score	Opposition Score	Opposition Score	Opposition Score	Opposition Score	Opposition Score	Rank
Reena Pärnat	Women's individual	646	42	Kumari (IND); L 5–6	Did not advance					

== Athletics ==
Estonian track and field athletes achieved the entry standards for Paris 2024, either by passing the direct qualifying mark (or time) or by world ranking, in the following events (a maximum of 3 athletes each):

Key

- Q = Qualified for the next round
- NR = National record
- Bye = Athlete not required to compete in round

Track and road events

Athlete	Event	Heat		Repechage		Semifinal		Final	
Athlete	Event	Result	Rank	Result	Rank	Result	Rank	Result	Rank
Rasmus Mägi	Men's 400 m hurdles	48.62	1 Q	Bye		48.16	2 Q	52.53	7

Field events

Athlete	Event	Qualification		Final	
Athlete	Event	Distance	Position	Distance	Position
Elisabeth Pihela	Women's high jump	1.83	=26	Did not advance	

Combined events – Men's decathlon

Athlete	Event	100 m	LJ	SP	HJ	400 m	110H	DT	PV	JT	1500 m	Final	Rank
Johannes Erm	Result	10.64	7.66	14.61	2.08	47.19	14.35	46.29	4.60	59.58	4:19.71	8569	6
Johannes Erm	Points	942	975	766	878	949	930	793	790	732	814	8569	6
Janek Õiglane	Result	10.89	7.25	14.58	1.99	48.02	14.45	43.39	5.30	71.89	4:25.59	8572	5
Janek Õiglane	Points	885	874	764	794	908	917	734	1004	918	774	8572	5
Karel Tilga	Result	11.01	7.16	15.88	1.99	48.67	14.66	50.13	4.70	64.16	4:26.41	8377	11
Karel Tilga	Points	858	852	844	794	877	891	873	819	801	768	8377	11

== Badminton ==
Estonia entered one badminton player into the Olympic tournament based on the BWF Race to Paris Rankings.

Athlete	Event	Group stage			Elimination	Quarter-final	Semi-final	Final / BM	
Athlete	Event	Opposition Score	Opposition Score	Rank	Opposition Score	Opposition Score	Opposition Score	Opposition Score	Rank
Kristin Kuuba	Women's singles	Abdul Razzaq (MDV); W (21–7, 21–9)	Sindhu (IND); L (5–21, 10–21)	2	Did not advance				

== Cycling ==
=== Road ===
Estonia entered one male rider to compete in the men's road race events at the Olympic, after securing the quota through the UCI Nation Ranking.

Athlete	Event	Time	Rank
Madis Mihkels	Men's road race	6:23:16	30

=== Mountain biking ===
Estonian mountain bikers secured one female quota place for the Olympic Games through the release of the final Olympic mountain biking rankings.

Athlete	Event	Time	Rank
Janika Lõiv	Women's cross-country	1:35:05	19

== Equestrian ==
=== Jumping ===
Athlete	Horse	Event	Qualification		Final		
Athlete	Horse	Event	Penalties	Rank	Penalties	Time	Rank
My Relander	Expert	Individual	RT		Did not advance		

== Fencing ==
Estonia entered one fencer into the Olympic competition. Nelli Differt secured her quota places in women's épée events, after being nominated as one of the highest ranked individual fencers. She was eligible for European zone through the release of the FIE Official rankings for Paris 2024.

Athlete	Event	Round of 64	Round of 32	Round of 16	Quarterfinal	Semifinal	Final / BM	
Athlete	Event	Opposition Score	Opposition Score	Opposition Score	Opposition Score	Opposition Score	Opposition Score	Rank
Nelli Differt	Women's épée	Bye	Kang (KOR); W 14–13	Klasik (POL); W 11–10	Santuccio (ITA); W 10–9	Kong (HKG); L 11–15	Muhari (HUN); L 14–15	4

== Judo ==
Estonia qualified one judoka for the following weight class at the Games. Klen Kristofer Kaljulaid (men's middleweight, 90 kg) qualified via continental quota based on Olympic point rankings.

Athlete	Event	Round of 32	Round of 16	Quarterfinals	Semifinals	Repechage	Final / BM	
Athlete	Event	Opposition Result	Opposition Result	Opposition Result	Opposition Result	Opposition Result	Opposition Result	Rank
Klen Kristofer Kaljulaid	Men's −90 kg	Feuillet (MRI); W 10–00	Murao (JPN); L 00–10	Did not advance				

== Rowing ==
Estonian rowers qualified boats in each of the following classes through 2024 Final Qualification Regatta in Lucerne, Switzerland.

Athlete	Event	Heats		Repechage		Final	
Athlete	Event	Time	Rank	Time	Rank	Time	Rank
Tõnu Endrekson; Mikhail Kushteyn; Johann Poolak; Allar Raja	Men's quadruple sculls	5:52.04	4 R	5:55.74	4 FB	5:50.55	7

FB=Final B (non-medal); R=Repechage

Fifth rower Uku Siim Timmusk was included in the team as reserve.

== Sailing ==
Estonian sailors secured a quota place in the following events, through the 2024 Semaine Olympique Française (Last Chance Regatta) in Hyères, France and the allocations of Emerging Nations Programs.

Elimination events

Athlete	Event	Opening rounds																Quarterfinal	Semifinal	Final	Final rank
Athlete	Event	1	2	3	4	5	6	7	8	9	10	11	12	13	14	Net points	Rank	Quarterfinal	Semifinal	Final	Final rank
Ingrid Puusta	Women's IQFoil	~~25~~; ~~BFD~~	9	13	11	15	9	10	13	17	18	~~22~~	18	14	15	162	17	Did not advance			17

Medal race events

Athlete	Event	Race									Net points	Final rank
Athlete	Event	1	2	3	4	5	6	7	8	M*	Net points	Final rank
Karl-Martin Rammo	Men's ILCA 7	34	6	28	~~39~~	27	29	9	33	EL	166	31

Key: M – Medal race; EL – Eliminated

== Shooting ==
Estonian shooters achieved quota places for the following events based on their results at the 2022 and 2023 ISSF World Championships, 2022, 2023, and 2024 European Championships, 2023 European Games, and 2024 ISSF World Olympic Qualification Tournament.

Athlete	Event	Qualification		Final	
Athlete	Event	Points	Rank	Points	Rank
Peeter Olesk	Men's 25 m rapid fire pistol	583	11	Did not advance	
Peeter Jürisson	Men's skeet	113	28	Did not advance	

== Swimming ==
Estonian swimmers achieved the entry standards in the following events for Paris 2024 (a maximum of two swimmers under the Olympic Qualifying Time (OQT) and potentially at the Olympic Consideration Time (OCT)):

Athlete	Event	Heat		Semifinal		Final	
Athlete	Event	Time	Rank	Time	Rank	Time	Rank
Kregor Zirk	Men's 200 m butterfly	1:55.52	10 Q	1:54.22	5 Q	1:54.55	7
Kregor Zirk	Men's 400 m freestyle	3:49.59	22	—		Did not advance	
Eneli Jefimova	Women's 100 m breaststroke	1:06.24	8 Q	1:06.23	8 Q	1:06.50	7
Eneli Jefimova	Women's 200 m breaststroke	2:30.68	23	Did not advance			

== Weightlifting ==
Estonia entered one male weightlifter into the Olympic competition. Mart Seim (men's above 102 kg) secured one quota to participate in his weight division based on the re-allocation of unused host country or universality spots.

Athlete	Event	Snatch		Clean & Jerk		Total	Rank
Athlete	Event	Result	Rank	Result	Rank	Total	Rank
Mart Seim	Men's +102 kg	180	9	220	9	400	9

== Wrestling ==
Estonia sent only one wrestler. Heiki Nabi received a quota due to the reallocation of Individual Neutral Athletes (AINs) claimed by the International Olympic Committee.

Key:

- PP (ranking points: 3–1 or 1–3) – Decision by points – the loser with technical points.

Greco-Roman

Athlete	Event	Round of 16	Quarterfinal	Semifinal	Repechage	Final / BM	
Athlete	Event	Opposition Result	Opposition Result	Opposition Result	Opposition Result	Opposition Result	Rank
Heiki Nabi	Men's −130 kg	Shariati (AZE); L 1–1 ^{PP}	Did not advance				

== See also ==
- Estonia at the 2024 Winter Youth Olympics
