= Gullickson =

Gullickson is a surname.

Notable people with this surname include:

- Bill Gullickson (born 1959), American baseball player; father of Carly and Chelsey
- Carly Gullickson (born 1986), American tennis player; daughter of Bill, sister of Chelsey
- Chelsey Gullickson (born 1990), American tennis player; daughter of Bill, sister of Carly
- Lloyd Gullickson (1899–1982), American golfer
- Thomas Gullickson (born 1950), American prelate

== See also ==
- Ted Gullicksen (1953–2014), American housing rights activist
- Gulliksen
- Gullikson
