= Japan at the 2024 Summer Olympics =

- IOC code: JPN
- NOC: Japanese Olympic Committee
- Website: www.joc.or.jp (in Japanese)

in Paris, France 26 July 2024 – 11 August 2024
- Competitors: 404 (213 men and 191 women) in 34 sports
- Flag bearers (opening): Shigeyuki Nakarai & Misaki Emura
- Flag bearer (closing): Haruka Kitaguchi
- Officials: Mitsugi Ogata, chef de mission
- Medals Ranked 3rd: Gold 20 Silver 12 Bronze 13 Total 45

Summer Olympics appearances (overview)
- 1912; 1920; 1924; 1928; 1932; 1936; 1948; 1952; 1956; 1960; 1964; 1968; 1972; 1976; 1980; 1984; 1988; 1992; 1996; 2000; 2004; 2008; 2012; 2016; 2020; 2024; 2028

Japan, the previous host of the 2020 Olympics at Tokyo, competed at the 2024 Summer Olympics in Paris from 26 July to 11 August 2024. Japanese athletes have appeared in every edition of the Summer Olympic Games from 1912 onwards, except for two occasions: the 1948 Summer Olympics in London, to which they were not invited because of the nation's role in World War II, and the 1980 Summer Olympics in Moscow, due to their participation in the United States-led boycott.

== Medalists ==
The following Japanese competitors won medals at the Games. In the by discipline sections below, medalists' names are bolded.

Medal	Name	Sport	Event	Date
Gold	Natsumi Tsunoda	Judo	Women's −48 kg	27 July
Gold	Hifumi Abe	Judo	Men's −66 kg	28 July
Gold	Coco Yoshizawa	Skateboarding	Women's street	28 July
Gold	Koki Kano	Fencing	Men's épée	28 July
Gold	Yuto Horigome	Skateboarding	Men's street	29 July
Gold	Takaaki Sugino; Shinnosuke Oka; Daiki Hashimoto; Kazuma Kaya; Wataru Tanigawa	Gymnastics	Men's artistic team all-around	29 July
Gold	Takanori Nagase	Judo	Men's 81 kg	30 July
Gold	Shinnosuke Oka	Gymnastics	Men's artistic individual all-around	31 July
Gold	Kazuki Iimura; Kyosuke Matsuyama; Takahiro Shikine; Yudai Nagano	Fencing	Men's team foil	4 August
Gold	Shinnosuke Oka	Gymnastics	Men's horizontal bar	5 August
Gold	Kenichiro Fumita	Wrestling	Men's Greco-Roman 60 kg	6 August
Gold	Nao Kusaka	Wrestling	Men's Greco-Roman 77 kg	7 August
Gold	Akari Fujinami	Wrestling	Women's freestyle 53 kg	8 August
Gold	Rei Higuchi	Wrestling	Men's freestyle 57 kg	9 August
Gold	Tsugumi Sakurai	Wrestling	Women's freestyle 57 kg	9 August
Gold	Ami Yuasa	Breaking	B-Girls	9 August
Gold	Haruka Kitaguchi	Athletics	Women's javelin throw	10 August
Gold	Sakura Motoki	Wrestling	Women's freestyle 62 kg	10 August
Gold	Kotaro Kiyooka	Wrestling	Men's freestyle 65 kg	11 August
Gold	Yuka Kagami	Wrestling	Women's freestyle 76 kg	11 August
Silver	Liz Akama	Skateboarding	Women's street	28 July
Silver	Tomoyuki Matsushita	Swimming	Men's 400 m individual medley	28 July
Silver	Sanshiro Murao	Judo	Men's 90 kg	31 July
Silver	Akira Komata; Koki Kano; Masaru Yamada; Kazuyasu Minobe	Fencing	Men's team épée	2 August
Silver	Uta Abe; Soichi Hashimoto; Miku Tashiro; Sanshiro Murao; Rika Takayama; Tatsuru Saito; Saki Niizoe; Takanori Nagase; Aaron Wolf; Haruka Funakubo; Akira Sone; Ryuju Nagayama; Natsumi Tsunoda; Hifumi Abe	Judo	Mixed team	3 August
Silver	Kokona Hiraki	Skateboarding	Women's park	6 August
Silver	Keiju Okada; Miho Yoshioka	Sailing	Mixed 470	8 August
Silver	Sorato Anraku	Sport climbing	Men's combined	9 August
Silver	Rikuto Tamai	Diving	Men's 10 m platform	10 August
Silver	Hina Hayata; Miwa Harimoto; Miu Hirano	Table tennis	Women's team	10 August
Silver	Daichi Takatani	Wrestling	Men's freestyle 74 kg	10 August
Silver	Taishu Sato	Modern pentathlon	Men's	10 August
Bronze	Ryuju Nagayama	Judo	Men's −60 kg	27 July
Bronze	Yoshiaki Oiwa; Kazuma Tomoto; Toshiyuki Tanaka; Ryuzo Kitajima	Equestrian	Team eventing	29 July
Bronze	Soichi Hashimoto	Judo	Men's 73 kg	29 July
Bronze	Haruka Funakubo	Judo	Women's 57 kg	29 July
Bronze	Sera Azuma; Yuka Ueno; Karin Miyawaki; Komaki Kikuchi	Fencing	Women's team foil	1 August
Bronze	Yuta Watanabe; Arisa Higashino	Badminton	Mixed doubles	2 August
Bronze	Hina Hayata	Table tennis	Women's singles	3 August
Bronze	Nami Matsuyama; Chiharu Shida	Badminton	Women's doubles	3 August
Bronze	Risa Takashima; Seri Ozaki; Misaki Emura; Shihomi Fukushima	Fencing	Women's team sabre	3 August
Bronze	Hideki Matsuyama	Golf	Men's individual	4 August
Bronze	Shinnosuke Oka	Gymnastics	Men's parallel bars	5 August
Bronze	Nonoka Ozaki	Wrestling	Women's freestyle 68 kg	6 August
Bronze	Yui Susaki	Wrestling	Women's freestyle 50 kg	7 August

Medals by sport
**Sport**	1st place, gold medalist(s)	2nd place, silver medalist(s)	3rd place, bronze medalist(s)	Total
Wrestling	8	1	2	11
Judo	3	2	3	8
Gymnastics	3	0	1	4
Skateboarding	2	2	0	4
Fencing	2	1	2	5
Breaking	1	0	0	1
Athletics	1	0	0	1
Table tennis	0	1	1	2
Diving	0	1	0	1
Modern pentathlon	0	1	0	1
Sailing	0	1	0	1
Sport climbing	0	1	0	1
Swimming	0	1	0	1
Badminton	0	0	2	2
Equestrian	0	0	1	1
Golf	0	0	1	1
Total	20	12	13	45

Medals by gender
Gender	1st place, gold medalist(s)	2nd place, silver medalist(s)	3rd place, bronze medalist(s)	Total
Female	8	3	7	**18**
Male	12	7	4	**23**
Mixed	0	2	2	**4**
Total	20	12	13	45

Medals by date
**Date**	1st place, gold medalist(s)	2nd place, silver medalist(s)	3rd place, bronze medalist(s)	Total
27 July	1	0	1	2
28 July	3	2	0	5
29 July	2	0	3	5
30 July	1	0	0	1
31 July	1	1	0	2
1 August	0	0	1	1
2 August	0	1	1	2
3 August	0	1	3	4
4 August	1	0	1	2
5 August	1	0	1	2
6 August	1	1	1	3
7 August	1	0	1	2
8 August	1	1	0	2
9 August	3	1	0	4
10 August	2	4	0	6
11 August	2	0	0	2
Total	20	12	13	45

Multiple medalists
**Name**	**Sport**	1st place, gold medalist(s)	2nd place, silver medalist(s)	3rd place, bronze medalist(s)	**Total**
Oka	Gymnastics	3	0	1	4
Kano	Fencing	1	1	0	2
Abe	Judo	1	1	0	2
Tsunoda	Judo	1	1	0	2
Nagase	Judo	1	1	0	2
Murao	Judo	0	2	0	2
Funakubo	Judo	0	1	1	2
Nagayama	Judo	0	1	1	2
Hashimoto	Judo	0	1	1	2
Hayata	Table tennis	0	1	1	2

== Competitors ==
Mitsugi Ogata served as Japan's chef de mission.

The following is the list of the number of the competitors representing Japan in the Games.

Sport	Men	Women	Total
Archery	3	1	4
Artistic swimming	0	9	9
Athletics	29	20	49
Badminton	5	7	12
Basketball	12	12	24
Boxing	2	0	2
Breaking	2	2	4
Canoeing	2	1	3
Cycling	9	9	18
Diving	2	3	5
Equestrian	6	0	6
Fencing	7	7	14
Field hockey	0	16	16
Football	18	18	36
Golf	2	2	4
Gymnastics	6	5	11
Handball	14	0	14
Judo	7	7	14
Modern pentathlon	1	1	2
Rowing	3	2	5
Rugby sevens	12	12	24
Sailing	3	4	7
Shooting	2	1	3
Skateboarding	4	6	10
Sport climbing	2	2	4
Surfing	3	1	4
Swimming	15	14	29
Table Tennis	3	3	6
Tennis	2	4	6
Triathlon	2	1	3
Volleyball	12	14	26
Water polo	13	0	13
Weightlifting	2	1	3
Wrestling	8	6	14
Total	213	191	404

== Archery ==
Japan fielded a full squad of men's team recurve by virtue of their bronze-medal victory at the 2023 World Championships in Berlin, Germany, obtaining one of three spots available at that competition.

Athlete	Event	Ranking round		Round of 64	Round of 32	Round of 16	Quarterfinals	Semifinals	Final / BM	
Athlete	Event	Score	Seed	Opposition Score	Opposition Score	Opposition Score	Opposition Score	Opposition Score	Opposition Score	Rank
Takaharu Furukawa	Men's individual	659	35	Nakanishi (JPN); L 4–6	Did not advance					
Junya Nakanishi	Men's individual	663	30	Furukawa (JPN); W 6–4	Unruh (GER); L 4–6	Did not advance				
Fumiya Saito	Men's individual	650	49	D'Amour (ISV); W 6–4	D'Almeida (BRA); L 1–7	Did not advance				
Takaharu Furukawa; Junya Nakanishi; Fumiya Saito	Men's team	1972	8	—N/a		Mexico; W 5–1	South Korea; L 0–6	Did not advance		
Satsuki Noda	Women's individual	666	12	Chiu Y-c (TPE); W 6–0	Lopez (FRA); W 6–2	Gökkır (TUR); L 4–6	Did not advance			
Junya Nakanishi; Satsuki Noda	Mixed team	1329	11 Q	—N/a		Turkey; W 5–4	United States; L 3–5	Did not advance		

== Artistic swimming ==
Japan fielded a full-squad of eight artistic swimmers to compete in the open team and women's duet event, by virtue of the five highest rank eligible nations in the combined open team results, at the 2024 World Aquatics Championships in Doha, Qatar.

Athlete	Event	Technical routine		Free routine			Acrobatic routine		
Athlete	Event	Points	Rank	Points	Total (technical + free)	Rank	Points	Total	Rank
Moe Higa; Tomoka Sato	Duet	257.3533	6	249.7271	507.0804	8	—N/a		
Moe Higa; Moeka Kijima; Uta Kobayashi; Tomoka Sato; Ayano Shimada; Ami Wada; Mashiro Yasunaga; Megumu Yoshida	Team	284.9017	3	343.0291	627.9308	6	252.7533	880.6841	5

== Athletics ==
Japanese track and field athletes achieved the entry standards for Paris 2024, either by passing the direct qualifying mark (or time for track and road races) or by world ranking, in the following events (a maximum of 3 athletes each):

Key

- Note–Ranks given for track events are within the athlete's heat only
- Q = Qualified for the next round
- q = Qualified for the next round as a fastest loser or, in field events, by position without achieving the qualifying target
- R = Qualified to repechage round
- NR = National record
- N/A = Round not applicable for the event
- Bye = Athlete not required to compete in round

Track and road events
Men

Athlete	Event	Heat		Repechage		Semifinal		Final	
Athlete	Event	Result	Rank	Result	Rank	Result	Rank	Result	Rank
Abdul Hakim Sani Brown	100 m	10.02	2 Q	—N/a		9.96	4	Did not advance	
Akihiro Higashida	100 m	10.19	5	—N/a		Did not advance			
Ryuichiro Sakai	100 m	10.17	5	—N/a		Did not advance			
Towa Uzawa	200 m	20.33	3 Q	—N/a		20.54	6	Did not advance	
Shota Iizuka	200 m	20.67	5 R	20.72	4	Did not advance			
Koki Ueyama	200 m	20.84	6 R	20.92	4	Did not advance			
Fuga Sato	400 m	46.13	6 R	DNS		Did not advance			
Kentaro Sato	400 m	45.60	5 R	DNS		Did not advance			
Yuki Joseph Nakajima	400 m	45.37	6 R	DNS		Did not advance			
Tomoki Ota	10000 m	—N/a						29:12.48	24
Jun Kasai	10000 m	—N/a						27:53.18	20
Shunsuke Izumiya	110 m hurdles	13.27	3 Q	Bye		13.32	3	Did not advance	
Rachid Muratake	110 m hurdles	13.22	1 Q	Bye		13.26	4 q	13.21	5
Shunya Takayama	110 m hurdles	13.46	4 R	13.45	3	Did not advance			
Daiki Ogawa	400 m hurdles	50.21	6 R	49.25	5	Did not advance			
Kaito Tsutsue	400 m hurdles	50.50	7 R	DNS		Did not advance			
Ken Toyoda	400 m hurdles	53.62	6 R	DNS		Did not advance			
Ryuji Miura	3000 m steeplechase	8:12.41	4 Q	—N/a				8:11.72	8
Ryoma Aoki	3000 m steeplechase	8:29.03	8	—N/a				Did not advance	
Naoki Koyama	Marathon	—N/a						2:10:33	23
Akira Akasaki	Marathon	—N/a						2:07:32	6
Suguru Osako	Marathon	—N/a						2:09:25	13
Ryo Hamanishi	20 km walk	—N/a						1:20:33	18
Koki Ikeda	20 km walk	—N/a						1:19:41	7
Yuta Koga	20 km walk	—N/a						1:19:50	8
Akihiro Higashida; Yoshihide Kiryu; Ryuichiro Sakai; Abdul Hakim Sani Brown; Shoma Yamamoto; Hiroki Yanagita	4 × 100 m relay	38.06 SB	4 q	—N/a				37.78 SB	5
Kaito Kawabata; Yuki Joseph Nakajima; Yudai Nishi; Fuga Sato; Kentaro Sato; Takuho Yoshizu	4 × 400 m relay	2:59.48 NR	4 q	—N/a				2:58.33 AR	6

Women

Athlete	Event	Heat		Repechage		Semifinal		Final	
Athlete	Event	Result	Rank	Result	Rank	Result	Rank	Result	Rank
Nozomi Tanaka	1500 m	4:04.28	11 qR	Bye		3:59.70 SB	11	Did not advance	
Yume Goto	1500 m	4:09.41 PB	13 R	4:10.40	11	Did not advance			
Nozomi Tanaka	5000 m	15:00.62	9	—N/a				Did not advance	
Yuma Yamamoto	5000 m	15:43.67	17	—N/a				Did not advance	
Wakana Kabasawa	5000 m	15:50.86	19	—N/a				Did not advance	
Rino Goshima	10000 m	—N/a						31:29.48	18
Haruka Kokai	10000 m	—N/a						31:44.03	19
Yuka Takashima	10000 m	—N/a						31:52.07 SB	22
Mako Fukube	100 m hurdles	12.85	4 q	—N/a		12.89	5	Did not advance	
Yumi Tanaka	100 m hurdles	12.90	5 R	12.89	2 Q	12.91	7	Did not advance	
Mao Ichiyama	Marathon	—N/a						2:34:13	51
Yuka Suzuki	Marathon	—N/a						2:24:02	6
Honami Maeda	Marathon	—N/a						DNS	
Nanako Fujii	20 km walk	—N/a						1:34:26	32
Kumiko Okada	20 km walk	—N/a						DNS	
Ayane Yanai	20 km walk	—N/a						DNS	

Mixed

Athlete	Event	Final	
Athlete	Event	Time	Rank
Masatora Kawano; Kumiko Okada	Marathon walk relay	2:55:40	8
Kazuki Takahashi; Ayane Yanai	Marathon walk relay	2:58:08	13

Field events

Athlete	Event	Qualification		Final	
Athlete	Event	Distance	Position	Distance	Position
Ryoichi Akamatsu	Men's high jump	2.27 SB	5 q	2.31 PB	5
Tomohiro Shinno	Men's high jump	2.20	23	Did not advance	
Yuki Hashioka	Men's long jump	7.81	17	Did not advance	
Roderick Genki Dean	Men's javelin throw	82.48	13	Did not advance	
Sumire Hata	Women's long jump	6.31	26	Did not advance	
Mariko Morimoto	Women's triple jump	13.40	28	Did not advance	
Haruka Kitaguchi	Women's javelin throw	62.58	7 Q	65.80 SB	1st place, gold medalist(s)
Marina Saito	Women's javelin throw	59.42	21	Did not advance	
Momone Ueda	Women's javelin throw	61.08	12 q	61.64 SB	10

== Badminton ==
Japan entered twelve badminton players into the Olympic tournament based on the BWF Race to Paris Rankings.

Men

Athlete	Event	Group stage					Elimination	Quarter-final	Semi-final	Final / BM	
Athlete	Event	Opposition Score	Opposition Score	Opposition Score	Opposition Score	Rank	Opposition Score	Opposition Score	Opposition Score	Opposition Score	Rank
Kodai Naraoka	Singles	Coelho (BRA); W 2–0	Hyeok-jin (KOR); W 2–0	—N/a		1Q	Chou (TPE); L 0–2	Did not advance			
Kenta Nishimoto	Singles	Panarin (KAZ); W 2–0	Yang (CAN); W 2–0	—N/a		1Q	Vitidsarn (THA); L 1–2	Did not advance			
Takuro Hoki; Yugo Kobayashi	Doubles	Lee / Wang (TPE); L 0–2	Chiu / Yuan (USA); W 2–0	Liu / Ou (CHN); L 0–2	Astrup / Rasmussen (DEN); L 0–2	4	—N/a	Did not advance			

Women

Athlete	Event	Group stage				Elimination	Quarter-final	Semi-final	Final / BM	
Athlete	Event	Opposition Score	Opposition Score	Opposition Score	Rank	Opposition Score	Opposition Score	Opposition Score	Opposition Score	Rank
Akane Yamaguchi	Singles	Thet Htar (MYA); W 2–0	Li (CAN); W 2–1	—N/a	1Q	Katethong (THA); W 2–0	An (KOR); L 1–2	Did not advance		8
Aya Ohori	Singles	Arın (TUR); W 2–0	Castillo (PER); W 2–0	—N/a	1Q	Yeo (SIN); W 2–1	Marín (ESP); L 0–2	Did not advance		7
Nami Matsuyama; Chiharu Shida	Doubles	Mapasa / Yu (AUS); W 2–0	Crasto / Ponnappa (IND); W 2–0	Kim / Kong (KOR); L 0–2	2Q	—N/a	Fruergaard / Thygesen (DEN); W 2–0	Liu / Tan (CHN); L 0–2	Tan / Muralitharan (MAS); W 2–0	3rd place, bronze medalist(s)
Mayu Matsumoto; Wakana Nagahara	Doubles	Rahayu / Ramadhanti (INA); W 2–0	Tan / Muralitharan (MAS); L 1–2	Chen / Jia (CHN); L 0–2	3	—N/a	Did not advance			

Mixed

Athlete	Event	Group stage				Quarter-final	Semi-final	Final / BM	
Athlete	Event	Opposition Score	Opposition Score	Opposition Score	Rank	Opposition Score	Opposition Score	Opposition Score	Rank
Yuta Watanabe; Arisa Higashino	Mixed doubles	Christiansen / Bøje (DEN); W W/O	Ye / Lee (TPE); W 2–0	Tang / Tse (HKG); W 2–1	1Q	Puavaranukroh / Taerattanachai (THA); W 2–0	Siwei / Yaqiong (CHN); L 0–2	Seo / Chae (KOR); W 2–0	3rd place, bronze medalist(s)

== Basketball ==
=== 5×5 basketball ===
Summary

Team	Event	Group stage				Quarterfinal	Semifinal	Final / BM	
Team	Event	Opposition Score	Opposition Score	Opposition Score	Rank	Opposition Score	Opposition Score	Opposition Score	Rank
Japan men's	Men's tournament	Germany; L 77–97	France; L 90–94 (OT)	Brazil; L 84–102	4	Did not advance			11
Japan women's	Women's tournament	United States; L 76–102	Germany; L 64–75	Belgium; L 58–85	4	Did not advance			12

==== Men's tournament ====
The Japanese men's basketball team, qualified for the games by virtue of their results through the 2023 FIBA Basketball World Cup in Okinawa, as the highest rank from Asian zone.

Team roster

A 16-player roster was announced on 26 June 2024. The final squad was announced on 8 July 2024.

Japan men's national basketball team – 2024 Summer Olympics roster
Players
Coaches

Pos.	No.	Name	Age – Date of birth	Height	Club	Ctr.
PG	2	Yuki Togashi (C)	30 – 30 July 1993	1.63 m (5 ft 4 in)	Chiba Jets Funabashi	(Japan)
SF	4	Akira Jacobs	20 – 13 April 2004	2.03 m (6 ft 8 in)	Hawaii Rainbow Warriors	(United States)
PG	5	Yuki Kawamura	23 – 2 May 2001	1.72 m (5 ft 8 in)	Yokohama B-Corsairs	(Japan)
SG	6	Makoto Hiejima	33 – 11 August 1990	1.91 m (6 ft 3 in)	Utsunomiya Brex	(Japan)
PG	7	Kai Toews	25 – 17 September 1998	1.88 m (6 ft 2 in)	Alvark Tokyo	(Japan)
PF	8	Rui Hachimura	26 – 8 February 1998	2.05 m (6 ft 9 in)	Los Angeles Lakers	(United States)
F	12	Yuta Watanabe	29 – 13 October 1994	2.06 m (6 ft 9 in)	Chiba Jets Funabashi	(Japan)
SG	18	Yudai Baba	28 – 7 November 1995	1.95 m (6 ft 5 in)	Nagasaki Velca	(Japan)
F/C	24	Josh Hawkinson	29 – 23 June 1995	2.08 m (6 ft 10 in)	Sun Rockers Shibuya	(Japan)
PG	30	Keisei Tominaga	23 – 1 February 2001	1.88 m (6 ft 2 in)	Indiana Pacers	(United States)
PF	34	Hugh Watanabe	25 – 23 December 1998	2.07 m (6 ft 9 in)	Ryukyu Golden Kings	(Japan)
SF	91	Hirotaka Yoshii	26 – 4 June 1998	1.96 m (6 ft 5 in)	Alvark Tokyo	(Japan)

Head coach

- (United States) Tom Hovasse

Assistant coach(es)

- (United States) Corey Gaines

Legend

- (C) Team captain
- Club – describes last
  club before the competition
- Age – describes age
  on 27 July 2024

Group play

Pos	Team	Pld	W	L	PF	PA	PD	Pts	Qualification
1	Germany	3	3	0	268	221	+47	6	Quarterfinals
2	France (H)	3	2	1	243	241	+2	5	Quarterfinals
3	Brazil	3	1	2	241	248	−7	4	Quarterfinals
4	Japan	3	0	3	251	293	−42	3	

Source: FIBA
Rules for classification: 1) classification points; 2) head-to-head results; 3) head-to-head game points difference; 4) head-to-head number of game points scored.
(H) Hosts

27 July 2024
13:30

Report

Germany	97–77	Japan
Scoring by quarter: 28–21, 24–23, 22–17, 23–16
Pts: F. Wagner 22; Rebs: Theis 7 Asts: Schröder 12		Pts: Hachimura 20; Rebs: Hawkinson 11; Asts: Kawamura 7

Stade Pierre-Mauroy, Lille
Attendance: 26,991
Referees: Antonio Conde (ESP), Boris Krejić (SLO), Amy Bonner (USA)

30 July 2024
17:15

Report

Japan	90–94 (OT)	France
Scoring by quarter: 25–32, 19–17, 20–20, 20–15, Overtime: 6–10
Pts: Kawamura 29; Rebs: Hawkinson, Watanabe 8 Asts: Kawamura 6		Pts: Wembanyama 18; Rebs: Gobert 15; Asts: Fournier, Wembanyama 6

Stade Pierre-Mauroy, Lille
Attendance: 26,900
Referees: Matthew Kallio (CAN), Wojciech Liszka (POL), Blanca Burns (USA)

2 August 2024
11:00

Report

Japan	84–102	Brazil
Scoring by quarter: 20–31, 24–24, 29–22, 11–25
Pts: Hawkinson 26; Rebs: Hawkinson 10; Asts: Kawamura 10		Pts: Caboclo 33; Rebs: Caboclo 17; Asts: Huertas 8

Stade Pierre-Mauroy, Lille
Attendance: 26,850
Referees: Matthew Kallio (CAN), Boris Krejić (SLO), Wojciech Liszka (POL)

==== Women's tournament ====
The Japanese women's basketball team, qualified by placing in the top three at the 2024 Olympic Qualifying Tournaments in Sopron, Hungary.

Team roster

An 18-player roster was announced on 24 May 2024. The final roster was revealed on 25 June 2024.

Japan women's national basketball team – 2024 Summer Olympics roster
Players
Coaches

Pos.	No.	Name	Age – Date of birth	Height	Club	Ctr.
PF	3	Stephanie Mawuli	25 – 25 November 1998	1.82 m (6 ft 0 in)	Basket Zaragoza	(Spain)
C	8	Maki Takada	34 – 23 August 1989	1.85 m (6 ft 1 in)	Denso Iris	(Japan)
PG	12	Asami Yoshida	36 – 9 October 1987	1.65 m (5 ft 5 in)	Aisin Wings	(Japan)
PG	13	Rui Machida	31 – 8 March 1993	1.62 m (5 ft 4 in)	Fujitsu Red Wave	(Japan)
SG	15	Nako Motohashi	30 – 10 October 1993	1.64 m (5 ft 5 in)	Tokyo Haneda Vickies	(Japan)
SG	23	Mai Yamamoto	24 – 23 October 1999	1.63 m (5 ft 4 in)	Toyota Antelopes	(Japan)
SF	27	Saki Hayashi (C)	29 – 16 March 1995	1.73 m (5 ft 8 in)	Fujitsu Red Wave	(Japan)
PF	30	Evelyn Mawuli	29 – 2 June 1995	1.80 m (5 ft 11 in)	Denso Iris	(Japan)
PG	32	Saori Miyazaki	28 – 27 August 1995	1.67 m (5 ft 6 in)	Eneos Sunflowers	(Japan)
PF	52	Yuki Miyazawa	31 – 2 June 1993	1.83 m (6 ft 0 in)	Fujitsu Red Wave	(Japan)
SF	75	Nanako Todo	23 – 29 November 2000	1.75 m (5 ft 9 in)	Toyota Boshoku Sunshine Rabbits	(Japan)
PF	88	Himawari Akaho	25 – 28 August 1998	1.84 m (6 ft 0 in)	Denso Iris	(Japan)

Head coach

- (Japan) Toru Onzuka

Assistant coach(es)

- (Japan) Kakeru Konno
- (Japan) Yoshikazu Suzuki

Legend

- (C) Team captain
- Club – describes last
  club before the tournament
- Age – describes age
  on 28 July 2024

Group play

Pos	Team	Pld	W	L	PF	PA	PD	Pts	Qualification
1	United States	3	3	0	276	218	+58	6	Quarterfinals
2	Germany	3	2	1	226	220	+6	5	Quarterfinals
3	Belgium	3	1	2	228	228	0	4	Quarterfinals
4	Japan	3	0	3	198	262	−64	3	

Source: FIBA
Rules for classification: 1) classification points; 2) head-to-head results; 3) head-to-head game points difference; 4) head-to-head number of game points scored.

29 July 2024
21:00

Report

United States	102–76	Japan
Scoring by quarter: 22–15, 28–24, 29–18, 23–19
Pts: Wilson 24; Rebs: Wilson 13; Asts: Gray 13		Pts: Takada 24; Rebs: four players 3 Asts: Machida, Yamamoto 5

Stade Pierre-Mauroy, Lille
Attendance: 13,040
Referees: Luis Castillo (ESP), Viola Györgyi (NOR), Yevgeniy Mikheyev (KAZ)

1 August 2024
11:00

Report

Japan	64–75	Germany
Scoring by quarter: 16–21, 20–21, 13–17, 15–16
Pts: Takada 15; Rebs: Akaho 8 Asts: Machida 9		Pts: S. Sabally 33; Rebs: Gülich, Geiselsöder 10; Asts: Fiebich 6

Stade Pierre-Mauroy, Lille
Attendance: 20,962
Referees: Gatis Saliņš (LAT), Viola Györgyi (NOR), Yevgeniy Mikheyev (KAZ)

4 August 2024
11:00

Report

Japan	58–85	Belgium
Scoring by quarter: 7–19, 16–20, 16–22, 19–24
Pts: Hayashi 13; Rebs: Akaho 5 Asts: Machida, Miyazaki 4		Pts: Meesseman 30; Rebs: Meesseman 11; Asts: Massey 7

Stade Pierre-Mauroy, Lille
Attendance: 25,134
Referees: Boris Krejić (SLO), Wojciech Liszka (POL), Péter Praksch (HUN)

== Boxing ==
Japan entered two boxers into the Olympic tournament. Shudai Harada (men's featherweight) and Sewon Okazawa (men's welterweight) qualified for Paris by advancing to the finals round in their respective division, at the 2022 Asian Games in Hangzhou, China.

Athlete	Event	Round of 32	Round of 16	Quarterfinals	Semifinals	Final	
Athlete	Event	Opposition Result	Opposition Result	Opposition Result	Opposition Result	Opposition Result	Rank
Shudai Harada	Men's 57 kg	Bye	González (COL); W 5–0	Ibáñez (BUL); L 0–5	Did not advance		
Sewon Okazawa	Men's 71 kg	Bye	Ishaish (JOR); L 2–3	Did not advance			

== Breaking ==
Japan entered four breakdancers to compete in the B-Boy and B-Girl dual battles for Paris 2024. Shigeyuki Nakarai (Shigekix) qualified for the games after he won the gold medal at the 2022 Asian Games in Hangzhou, China. Later on, Hiroto Ono (Hiro10), Ami Yuasa (Ami) and Ayumi Fukushima (Ayumi) outlasted from 2024 Olympic Qualifier Series in Shanghai, China and Budapest, Hungary.

Athlete	Nickname	Event	Round-robin		Quarterfinal	Semifinal	Final / BM	
Athlete	Nickname	Event	Votes	Rank	Opposition Result	Opposition Result	Opposition Result	Rank
Shigeyuki Nakarai	Shigekix	B-Boys	38	2 Q	Menno (NED); W 3–0	Phil Wizard (CAN); L 0–3	Victor (USA); L 0–3	4
Hiroto Ono	Hiro10	B-Boys	8	4	Did not advance			
Ami Yuasa	Ami	B-Girls	52	1 Q	Syssy (FRA); W (8–1, 9–0, 8–1)	India (NED); W (3–6, 6–3, 8–1)	Nicka (LTU); W (6–3, 5–4, 5–4)	1st place, gold medalist(s)
Ayumi Fukushima	Ayumi	B-Girls	31	2 Q	India (NED); L (5–4, 3–6, 2–7)	Did not advance		5

== Canoeing ==
=== Slalom ===
Japan entered two boats into the slalom competition, for the Games through the 2023 ICF Canoe Slalom World Championships in London, Great Britain. They also qualified a boat in the men's C-1 class of their result in the 2023 Asian Canoe Slalom Olympic Qualifiers.

Athlete	Event	Preliminary						Semifinal		Final	
Athlete	Event	Run 1	Rank	Run 2	Rank	Best	Rank	Time	Rank	Time	Rank
Takuya Haneda	Men's C-1	96.82	11	99.59	11	96.82	13 Q	103.11	13	Did not advance	
Yuuki Tanaka	Men's K-1	103.21	21	91.78	14	91.78	20 Q	101.90	14	Did not advance	
Haruka Okazaki	Women's C-1	122.50	20	130.42	18	122.5	20	Did not advance			
Aki Yazawa	Women's K-1	106.01	20	107.16	22	106.01	21 Q	114.50	17	Did not advance	

Kayak cross

Athlete	Event	Time trial		Round 1	Repechage	Heat	Quarterfinal	Semifinal	Final	
Athlete	Event	Time	Rank	Position	Position	Position	Position	Position	Position	Rank
Yuuki Tanaka	Men's KX-1	81.35	34	2 Q	Bye	3	Did not advance			20
Haruka Okazaki	Women's KX-1	84.16	36	4 R	3	Did not advance				37
Aki Yazawa	Women's KX-1	79.96	31	3 R	3	Did not advance				36

== Cycling ==
=== Road ===
Japan entered one male and one female rider to compete in the road race events at the Olympic. Japan secured those quota through the UCI Nation Ranking.

Athlete	Event	Time	Rank
Yukiya Arashiro	Men's road race	6:28:31	56
Eri Yonamine	Women's road race	4:04:23	26

=== Track ===
Japanese riders obtained a full spots for men's track events and women's sprint, keirin, team pursuit, madison, and omnium; following the release of the final UCI Olympic rankings.

Sprint

Athlete	Event	Qualification		Round 1	Repechage 1	Round 2	Repechage 2	Round 3	Repechage 3	Quarterfinals	Semifinals	Finals / BM	
Athlete	Event	Time Speed (km/h)	Rank	Opposition Time Speed (km/h)	Opposition Time Speed (km/h)	Opposition Time Speed (km/h)	Opposition Time Speed (km/h)	Opposition Time Speed (km/h)	Opposition Time Speed (km/h)	Opposition Time Speed (km/h)	Opposition Time Speed (km/h)	Opposition Time Speed (km/h)	Rank
Kaiya Ota	Men's sprint	9.350; 77.005	8 Q	Vigier (FRA); W 9.946; 72.391	Bye	Paul (TTO); L 10.173; 72.369	Helal (FRA); W 10.076; 71.457	Hoffman (NZL); W 9.774; 73.665	Bye	Carlin (GBR); W,L, L	Did not advance	5th place final Rudyk (POL); Obara (JPN); Turnbull (GBR); L	7
Yuta Obara	Men's sprint	9.483; 75.925	16 Q	Paul (TTO); L 9.917; 72.823	Dörnbach (GER); Vigier (FRA); W 9.829; 73.253	Hoffman (NZL); L 10.074; 73.327	Ortega (COL); W 9.835; 73.208	Lavreysen (NED); L 10.009; 73.134	Hoffman (NZL); Paul (TTO); W 10.043; 71.692	Richardson (AUS); L, L	Did not advance	5th place final Rudyk (POL); Turnbull (GBR); Ota (JPN); L	6
Mina Sato	Women's sprint	10.257; 70.196	7 Q	Kouamé (FRA); W 11.023; 65.318	Bye	Mitchell (CAN); W 10.816; 66.568	Bye	Hinze (GER); L 10.870; 66.433	Mitchell (CAN); Clonan (AUS); L 10.724; 67.841	Did not advance			
Riyu Ohta	Women's sprint	10.659; 67.549	20 Q	Gros (FRA); L 11.202; 65.449	Genest (CAN); Asri (MAS); L 11.312; 65.538	Did not advance							

Team sprint

Athlete	Event	Qualification		Semifinals		Final	
Athlete	Event	Time Speed (km/h)	Rank	Opposition Time Speed (km/h)	Rank	Opposition Time Speed (km/h)	Rank
Kaiya Ota; Yuta Obara; Yoshitaku Nagasako	Men's team sprint	42.174; 64.020	4 Q	France; 42.569; 63.426	2 Q5-6	Germany; 42.078; 64.167	5

Qualification legend: FA=Gold medal final; FB=Bronze medal final

Pursuit

Athlete	Event	Qualification		Semifinals		Final	
Athlete	Event	Time	Rank	Opponent Results	Rank	Opponent Results	Rank
Shunsuke Imamura; Eiya Hashimoto; Kazushige Kuboki	Men's team pursuit	3:53.489	10	Did not advance			
Maho Kakita; Mizuki Ikeda; Tsuyaka Uchino; Yumi Kajihara	Women's team pursuit	4:13.818	10	Did not advance			

Keirin

Athlete	Event	Round 1	Repechage	Quarterfinals	Semifinals	Final
Athlete	Event	Rank	Rank	Rank	Rank	Rank
Kaiya Ota	Men's keirin	3 R	1 Q	4 Q	DSQ	Did not advance
Shinji Nakano	Men's keirin	2 Q	Bye	4 Q	3 FA	DNF
Mina Sato	Women's keirin	2 Q	Bye	5	Did not advance	
Riyu Ohta	Women's keirin	5 R	1 Q	4 SF	6 FB	9

Omnium

Athlete	Event	Scratch race		Tempo race		Elimination race		Points race		Total	
Athlete	Event	Rank	Points	Rank	Points	Rank	Points	Rank	Points	Rank	Points
Kazushige Kuboki	Men's omnium	5	32	15	12	10	22	5	47	6	113
Yumi Kajihara	Women's omnium	16	10	17	8	21	1	5	25	16	44

Madison

Athlete	Event	Points	Laps	Rank
Shunsuke Imamura; Kazushige Kuboki	Men's madison	32	20	5
Maho Kakita; Tsuyaka Uchino	Women's madison	1	–	12

=== Mountain biking ===
Japanese mountain bikers secured one female quota places for the Olympics through 2023 UCI Mountain Bike World Championships in Glasgow, Great Britain.

Athlete	Event	Time	Rank
Urara Kawaguchi	Women's cross-country	-3 LAP	32

=== BMX ===
Freestyle

Japanese riders received a single quota spot in the men's BMX freestyle for Paris 2024, finishing among the top two at the 2022 UCI Urban Cycling World Championships in Abu Dhabi, United Arab Emirates.

Athlete	Event	Seeding		Final	
Athlete	Event	Points	Rank	Points	Rank
Rimu Nakamura	Men's freestyle	87.03	6 Q	90.89	5

Race

Japanese riders secured a single quota place in the women's BMX race for Paris 2024 by topping the field of nations vying for qualification at the 2023 Asian Championships in Tagaytay, Philippines.

Athlete	Event	Quarterfinal		Semifinal		Final	
Athlete	Event	Points	Rank	Points	Rank	Result	Rank
Sae Hatakeyama	Women's race	20	20 Q	22	8	Did not advance	

== Diving ==
Japanese divers secured five quota places for Paris 2024 by advancing to the top twelve final each of the men's individual platform, women's individual springboard and platform, respectively at the 2023 World Aquatics Championships in Fukuoka, and through 2024 World Aquatics Championships in Doha, Qatar and unused quota reallocation.

Athlete	Event	Preliminary		Semifinal		Final	
Athlete	Event	Points	Rank	Points	Rank	Points	Rank
Sakai Sho	Men's 3 m springboard	389.15	11	410.15	14	Did not advance	
Rikuto Tamai	Men's 10 m platform	497.15	2	477.00	3	507.65	2nd place, silver medalist(s)
Sayaka Mikami	Women's 3 m springboard	258.35	21	Did not advance			
Haruka Enomoto	Women's 3 m springboard	299.10	6	244.20	18	Did not advance	
Matsuri Arai	Women's 10 m platform	280.65	16	300.50	8	314.45	9

== Equestrian ==
Japan entered a squad of three jumping riders and three eventing riders into the Olympic equestrian. Japanese jumping squad entered the competition by securing the last of two available team spots at the International Equestrian Federation (FEI)-designated Olympic qualifier for Group G in Valkenswaard, Netherlands. Meanwhile, Japanese eventing squad entered the competition, through getting the re-allocation spots, at the Groups F and G qualification event in Millstreet, Ireland.

=== Eventing ===
Athlete	Horse	Event	Dressage		Cross-country			Jumping						Total	
Athlete	Horse	Event	Dressage		Cross-country			Qualifier			Final			Total	
Athlete	Horse	Event	Penalties	Rank	Penalties	Total	Rank	Penalties	Total	Rank	Penalties	Total	Rank	Penalties	Rank
Yoshiaki Oiwa	MGH Grafton Street	Individual	25.50	8	0.00	25.50	5	0.40	25.90	5	4.40	30.30	7	30.30	7
Kazuma Tomoto	Vinci de la Vigne JRA	Individual	27.40	18	0.00	27.40	8	0.00	27.40	7	0.00	27.40	5	27.40	5
Ryuzo Kitajima	Cekatinka JRA	Individual	34.50	37	6.40	34.50	28	Withdrawn							
Yoshiaki Oiwa; Kazuma Tomoto; Ryuzo Kitajima; Toshiyuki Tanaka (reserve)	MGH Grafton Street; Vinci de la Vigne JRA; Cekatinka JRA; Jefferson JRA	Team	87.40	5	6.40	93.80	3	2.00	115.80	3	—N/a			115.80	3rd place, bronze medalist(s)

=== Jumping ===
Athlete	Horse	Event	Qualification		Final		
Athlete	Horse	Event	Penalties	Rank	Penalties	Time	Rank
Takashi Haase Shibayama	Karamell M&M	Individual	0	20 Q	Retired		
Eiken Sato	Chadellano	Individual	Retired				
Taizo Sugitani	Quincy 194	Individual	9	54	Did not advance		
Takashi Haase Shibayama; Eiken Sato; Taizo Sugitani	See above	Team	51	16	Did not advance		

Reserve is Mike Kawai on Saxo de la Cour.

== Fencing ==
Japan entered eighteen fencers into the Olympic competition. Kento Yoshida and Miho Yoshimura qualified for the games, by nominated one of two highest ranked individual fencers for Asian & Oceanian zone; meanwhile, the nations men's and women's foil team, and also men's épée team, qualified for the games after becoming one the four highest ranked worldwide team; meanwhile, women's sabre team qualified after becoming the highest ranked team, eligible for Asia & Oceania zone; through the release of the FIE Official ranking for Paris 2024.

Athlete	Event	Round of 64	Round of 32	Round of 16	Quarterfinal	Semifinal	Final / BM	
Athlete	Event	Opposition Score	Opposition Score	Opposition Score	Opposition Score	Opposition Score	Opposition Score	Rank
Koki Kano	Men's épée	Bye	Kim (KOR); W 14–12	Wang (CHN); W 15–4	Kurbanov (KAZ); W 15–6	Andrásfi (HUN); W 14–13	Borel (FRA); W 15–9	1st place, gold medalist(s)
Kazuyasu Minobe	Men's épée	Bye	Yasseen (EGY); W 9–8	Borel (FRA); L 11–15	Did not advance			
Masaru Yamada	Men's épée	Bye	Hang (HKG); W 15–9	Di Veroli (ITA); W 15–11	Borel (FRA); L 11–12	Did not advance		
Koki Kano; Kazuyasu Minobe; Masaru Yamada	Men's team épée	—N/a			Venezuela W 39–33	Czech Republic W 45–37	Hungary L 25–26	2nd place, silver medalist(s)
Kazuki Iimura	Men's foil	Bye	Abouelkassem (EGY); W 15–8	Massialas (USA); W15–8	Pauty (FRA); W 15–14	Cheung (HKG); L 11–15	Itkin (USA); L 12–15	4
Kyosuke Matsuyama	Men's foil	Bye	Mertine (FRA); W 15–6	Macchi (ITA); L 11–15	Did not advance			
Takahiro Shikine	Men's foil	Bye	Pauty (FRA); L 9–15	Did not advance				
Kazuki Iimura; Kyosuke Matsuyama; Takahiro Shikine; Yudai Nagano	Men's team foil	—N/a			Canada; W 45–26	France; W 45–37	Italy; W 45–36	1st place, gold medalist(s)
Kento Yoshida	Men's sabre	Bye	Pakdaman (IRI); L 11–15	Did not advance				
Miho Yoshimura	Women's épée	Uwihoreye (RWA); W 15–7	Sun (CHN); W 14–13	Kharkova (UKR); L 10–15	Did not advance			
Sera Azuma	Women's foil	Bye	Chan (HKG); L 14–15	Did not advance				
Karin Miyawaki	Women's foil	Bye	Lacheray (FRA); L 10–15	Did not advance				
Yuka Ueno	Women's foil	Bye	Călugăreanu (ROU); L 13–15	Did not advance				
Sera Azuma; Karin Miyawaki; Yuka Ueno	Women's team foil	—N/a			Poland; W 45–30	Italy; L 39–45	Canada; W 33–32	3rd place, bronze medalist(s)
Misaki Emura	Women's sabre	Bye	Kravatska (UKR); W 15–14	Choi (KOR); L 7–15	Did not advance			
Shihomi Fukushima	Women's sabre	Bye	Kharlan (UKR); L 9–15	Did not advance				
Risa Takashima	Women's sabre	Bye	Ilieva (BUL); L 10–15	Did not advance				
Misaki Emura; Shihomi Fukushima; Seri Ozaki; Risa Takashima	Women's team sabre	—N/a			Hungary; W 45–37	Ukraine; L 32–45	France; W 45–40	3rd place, bronze medalist(s)

== Field hockey ==
Summary

Key:

- FT – After full-time.
- P – Match decided by penalty-shootout.

Team	Event	Group stage						Quarterfinal	Semifinal	Final / BM	
Team	Event	Opposition Score	Opposition Score	Opposition Score	Opposition Score	Opposition Score	Rank	Opposition Score	Opposition Score	Opposition Score	Rank
Japan women's	Women's tournament	Germany; L 0–2	China; L 0–5	Belgium; L 0–3	France; W 1–0	Netherlands; L 1–5	5	Did not advance			

=== Women's tournament ===
Japan women's national field hockey team qualified for the Olympics by finishing in the top three at the 2024 FIH Olympic Qualifiers.

Team roster

The squad was announced on 14 June 2024.

Head coach: (India) Jude Menezes

No.	Pos.	Player	Date of birth (age)	Caps	Goals	Club
1	GK	Eika Nakamura	4 March 1996 (aged 28)	54	0	(Japan) Coca–Cola Red Sparks
5	DF	Yu Asai	8 January 1996 (aged 28)	124	8	(Japan) Coca–Cola Red Sparks
7	DF	Miyu Suzuki	8 January 1999 (aged 25)	74	7	(Japan) Sony HC Bravia Ladies
9	FW	Yuri Nagai (Captain)	26 May 1992 (aged 32)	232	78	(Japan) Sony HC Bravia Ladies
10	MF	Hazuki Nagai	15 August 1994 (aged 29)	219	65	(Japan) Sakai Town
11	DF	Shihori Oikawa	12 March 1989 (aged 35)	186	55	(Japan) Tokyo Verdy Hockey Team
13	DF	Miki Kozuka	13 January 1996 (aged 28)	116	2	(Japan) GlaxoSmithKline Orange United
17	FW	Shiho Kobayakawa	12 April 1999 (aged 25)	49	11	(Japan) Coca–Cola Red Sparks
19	FW	Kanon Mori	1 May 1996 (aged 28)	62	22	(Japan) Coca–Cola Red Sparks
21	FW	Mai Toriyama	13 April 1995 (aged 29)	61	16	(Japan) Nanto Bank SHOOTING STARS
23	MF	Saki Tanaka	18 September 1998 (aged 25)	18	2	(Japan) GlaxoSmithKline Orange United
25	DF	Kana Urata	27 December 1998 (aged 25)	51	9	(Japan) Coca–Cola Red Sparks
26	MF	Amiru Shimada	23 June 1998 (aged 26)	50	7	(Japan) Nanto Bank SHOOTING STARS
29	MF	Sakurako Omoto	19 March 1998 (aged 26)	77	2	(Japan) Coca–Cola Red Sparks
36	FW	Miyu Hasegawa	20 November 2001 (aged 22)	28	9	(Japan) Sony HC Bravia Ladies
37	DF	Rika Ogawa	28 July 1994 (aged 29)	23	2	(Japan) Sony HC Bravia Ladies

Group play

Pos	Team	Pld	W	D	L	GF	GA	GD	Pts	Qualification
1	Netherlands	5	5	0	0	19	5	+14	15	Quarter-finals
2	Belgium	5	4	0	1	13	4	+9	12	Quarter-finals
3	Germany	5	3	0	2	12	7	+5	9	Quarter-finals
4	China	5	2	0	3	15	10	+5	6	Quarter-finals
5	Japan	5	1	0	4	2	15	−13	3	
6	France (H)	5	0	0	5	4	24	−20	0	

Source: FIH
Rules for classification: 1) points; 2) matches won; 3) goal difference; 4) goals for; 5) head-to-head result; 6) field goals scored.
(H) Hosts

28 July 2024
10:30
v

Germany	2–0	Japan
Stapenhorst 12'; Lorenz 56'	Report

Pitch 2
Umpires:
Alison Keogh (IRE)
Sarah Wilson (GBR)

29 July 2024
10:30
v

Japan	0–5	China
	Report	Zhong 16'; Li 19'; Ma 23'; Gu 24', 55'

Pitch 2
Umpires:
Annelize Rostron (RSA)
Wanri Venter (RSA)

31 July 2024
17:00
v

Belgium	3–0	Japan
Brasseur 28'; Englebert 29'; Ballenghien 52'	Report

Pitch 1
Umpires:
Gabriel Labate (ARG)
Ayanna McClean (TTO)

1 August 2024
19:45
v

Japan	1–0	France
Toriyama 12'

Pitch 1
Umpires:
Rachel Williams (GBR)
Aleisha Neumann (AUS)

3 August 2024
10:30
v

Netherlands	5–1	Japan
Jansen 4'; Matla 9', 40'; Burg 14'; Veen 53'	Report	Kobayakawa 23'

Pitch 2
Umpires:
Rachel Williams (GBR)
Sarah Wilson (GBR)

== Football ==
Summary

Key:

- A.E.T – After extra time.
- P – Match decided by penalty-shootout.

Team	Event	Group Stage				Quarterfinal	Semifinal	Final / BM	
Team	Event	Opposition Score	Opposition Score	Opposition Score	Rank	Opposition Score	Opposition Score	Opposition Score	Rank
Japan men's	Men's tournament	Paraguay; **W** 5–0	Mali; **W** 1–0	Israel; **W** 1–0	1 **Q**	Spain; **L** 0–3	Did not advance		5
Japan women's	Women's tournament	Spain; **L** 1–2	Brazil; **W** 2–1	Nigeria; **W** 3–1	2 **Q**	United States; **L** 0–1	Did not advance		5

=== Men's tournament ===
Japan men's football team qualified for the Olympics by advancing to the finals of the 2024 AFC U-23 Asian Cup in Doha, Qatar.

Team roster

Japan announced their final squad on 3 July 2024. Kodai Sano withdrew on 23 July after being recalled by his club and was replaced by Asahi Uenaka in the alternative list. On the following day, Kaito Suzuki replaced the injured Riku Handa, while Takashi Uchino was called-up as an alternate player.

Head coach: Gō Ōiwa

No.	Pos.	Player	Date of birth (age)	Club
1	GK	Leo Kokubo	23 January 2001 (aged 23)	(Portuguese Football Federation) Benfica
2	DF	Kaito Suzuki	25 August 2002 (aged 21)	(Japan Football Association) Júbilo Iwata
3	DF	Ryūya Nishio	16 May 2001 (aged 23)	(Japan Football Association) Cerezo Osaka
4	DF	Hiroki Sekine	11 August 2002 (aged 21)	(Japan Football Association) Kashiwa Reysol
5	DF	Seiji Kimura	24 August 2001 (aged 22)	(Japan Football Association) Sagan Tosu
6	MF	Sota Kawasaki	30 July 2001 (aged 22)	(Japan Football Association) Kyoto Sanga
7	MF	Rihito Yamamoto	12 December 2001 (aged 22)	(Royal Belgian Football Association) Sint-Truiden
8	MF	**Joel Chima Fujita** (captain)	16 February 2002 (aged 22)	(Royal Belgian Football Association) Sint-Truiden
9	FW	Shōta Fujio	2 May 2001 (aged 23)	(Japan Football Association) Machida Zelvia
10	MF	Koki Saito	10 August 2001 (aged 22)	(Royal Dutch Football Association) Sparta Rotterdam
11	FW	**Mao Hosoya**	7 September 2001 (aged 22)	(Japan Football Association) Kashiwa Reysol
12	GK	Taishi Brandon Nozawa	25 December 2002 (aged 21)	(Japan Football Association) FC Tokyo
13	MF	Ryotaro Araki	29 January 2002 (aged 22)	(Japan Football Association) FC Tokyo
14	MF	Shunsuke Mito	28 September 2002 (aged 21)	(Royal Dutch Football Association) Sparta Rotterdam
15	DF	Kota Takai	4 September 2004 (aged 19)	(Japan Football Association) Kawasaki Frontale
16	DF	Ayumu Ohata	27 April 2001 (aged 23)	(Japan Football Association) Urawa Red Diamonds
17	FW	Yu Hirakawa	3 January 2001 (aged 23)	(Japan Football Association) Machida Zelvia
18	FW	Kein Sato	11 July 2001 (aged 23)	(German Football Association) Werder Bremen
19	FW	Asahi Uenaka	1 November 2001 (aged 22)	(Japan Football Association) Yokohama F. Marinos
20	MF	Fuki Yamada	10 July 2001 (aged 23)	(Japan Football Association) Tokyo Verdy
21	DF	Takashi Uchino	7 March 2001 (aged 23)	(German Football Association) Fortuna Düsseldorf

Players in bold have been capped at full international level.

Group play

Pos	Team	Pld	W	D	L	GF	GA	GD	Pts	Qualification
1	Japan	3	3	0	0	7	0	+7	**9**	Advance to knockout stage
2	Paraguay	3	2	0	1	5	7	−2	**6**	Advance to knockout stage
3	Mali	3	0	1	2	1	3	−2	**1**	
4	Israel	3	0	1	2	3	6	−3	**1**	

Source: FIFA
Rules for classification: Group stage tiebreakers
24 July 2024
19:00

Japan	5–0	Paraguay
Mito 18', 63'; Yamamoto 69'; Fujio 81', 87'	Report

Stade de Bordeaux, Bordeaux
Attendance: 14,000
Referee: François Letexier (France)

27 July 2024
21:00

Japan	1–0	Mali
Yamamoto 82'	Report

Stade de Bordeaux, Bordeaux
Attendance: 9,893
Referee: Edina Alves Batista (Brazil)

30 July 2024
21:00

Israel	0–1	Japan
	Report	Hosoya 90+1'

Stade de la Beaujoire, Nantes
Attendance: 11,671
Referee: Saíd Martínez (Honduras)

Quarterfinal

2 August 2024
17:00

Japan	0–3	Spain
	Report	López 11', 73'; Ruiz 86'

Stade de Lyon, Décines-Charpieu
Attendance: 19,111
Referee: Dahane Beida (Mauritania)

=== Women's tournament ===
Japan women's football team qualified for the Olympics by winning the third round match of the 2024 AFC Women's Olympic Qualifying Tournament in Jeddah, Saudi Arabia, and in Tokyo.

Team roster

- Women's team event – one team of 18 players

Group play

Pos	Team	Pld	W	D	L	GF	GA	GD	Pts	Qualification
1	Spain	3	3	0	0	5	1	+4	**9**	Advance to knockout stage
2	Japan	3	2	0	1	6	4	+2	**6**	Advance to knockout stage
3	Brazil	3	1	0	2	2	4	−2	**3**	Advance to knockout stage
4	Nigeria	3	0	0	3	1	5	−4	**0**	

Source: FIFA
Rules for classification: Group stage tiebreakers
25 July 2024
17:00

Spain	2–1	Japan
Bonmatí 22'; Caldentey 74'	Report	Fujino 13'

Stade de la Beaujoire, Nantes
Attendance: 10,377
Referee: Bouchra Karboubi (Morocco)

28 July 2024
17:00

Brazil	1–2	Japan
Jheniffer 56'	Report	Kumagai 90+2' (pen.); Tanikawa 90+6'

Parc des Princes, Paris
Attendance: 40,918
Referee: Rebecca Welch (Great Britain)

31 July 2024
17:00

Japan	3–1	Nigeria
Hamano 22'; Tanaka 32'; Kitagawa 45+5'	Report	Echegini 42'

Stade de la Beaujoire, Nantes
Attendance: 6,480
Referee: Emikar Calderas (Venezuela)

Quarterfinal

3 August 2024
15:00

United States	1–0 (a.e.t.)	Japan
Rodman 105+2'	Report

Parc des Princes, Paris
Attendance: 43,004
Referee: Tess Olofsson (Sweden)

== Golf ==
Japan entered four golfers into the Olympic tournament. All of them qualified directly for the games in the men's and women's individual competitions, based on their own world ranking positions, on the IGF World Rankings.

Athlete	Event	Round 1	Round 2	Round 3	Round 4	Total		
Athlete	Event	Score	Score	Score	Score	Score	Par	Rank
Hideki Matsuyama	Men's	63	68	71	65	267	−17	3rd place, bronze medalist(s)
Keita Nakajima	Men's	70	70	73	74	287	+3	T49
Miyū Yamashita	Women's	71	70	68	73	282	−6	T4
Yuka Saso	Women's	77	74	72	82	305	+17	54

== Gymnastics ==
=== Artistic ===
Japan fielded a full squad of male and female artistic gymnasts for Paris. Five male gymnasts qualified for the games after scoring a runner-up finish in the team all-around at the 2022 World Championships in Liverpool, Great Britain. Meanwhile, the five female gymnasts qualified for the games after advancing to the final round of the team all-around at the 2023 World Championships in Antwerp, Belgium, obtaining one of nine available team spots for nations not yet qualified.

The five members of the men's and women's teams were announced in May 2024 after the conclusion of the NHK Trophy. For the first time in 40 years, all members named to the women's team were slated to be first-time Olympians. The men's team is led by Daiki Hashimoto, the defending Olympic all-around champion. In mid-July, nineteen-year-old Shoko Miyata was removed from the Japanese women's team after smoking and drinking alcohol, which are prohibited in Japan for those under 20. Since Miyata was removed for a reason other than injury, no athlete substitution was made. Thus, the women's team is anticipated to compete with only four athletes.

Men
Team

Athlete	Event	Qualification								Final							
Athlete	Event	Apparatus						Total	Rank	Apparatus						Total	Rank
Athlete	Event	F	PH	R	V	PB	HB	Total	Rank	F	PH	R	V	PB	HB	Total	Rank
Daiki Hashimoto	Team	13.733	14.466	~~13.733~~	14.566	~~14.833~~	~~13.733~~	85.064	3 Q	14.633	13.100		14.900		14.566	—N/a	
Kazuma Kaya	Team	14.100	~~14.266~~	14.066	—N/a	14.933	13.966	—N/a		14.000	14.366	14.000		14.733		—N/a	
Shinnosuke Oka	Team	14.333	14.466	14.000	~~14.233~~	15.300 Q	14.533 Q	86.865	2 Q	14.633		14.133		14.866	14.433	—N/a	
Takaaki Sugino	Team	—N/a	15.033 Q	—N/a	14.600	—N/a	14.733 Q	—N/a			14.866		14.700		14.566	—N/a	
Wataru Tanigawa	Team	~~13.433~~	—N/a	14.466	14.300	15.000 Q	—N/a					14.500	13.833	14.766		—N/a	
Total	Team	42.166	43.965	42.532	43.466	45.233	43.232	260.594	2 Q	43.266	42.332	42.633	43.433	44.365	43.565	259.594	1st place, gold medalist(s)

Individual finals

Athlete	Event	Qualification								Final							
Athlete	Event	Apparatus						Total	Rank	Apparatus						Total	Rank
Athlete	Event	F	PH	R	V	PB	HB	Total	Rank	F	PH	R	V	PB	HB	Total	Rank
Daiki Hashimoto	All-around	See team results above								14.633	12.966	13.400	14.766	14.433	14.400	84.598	6
Shinnosuke Oka	All-around	See team results above								14.566	14.500	13.866	14.300	15.100	14.500	86.832	1st place, gold medalist(s)
Takaaki Sugino	Pommel horse	—N/a	15.033	—N/a				15.033	4 Q	—N/a	14.933	—N/a				14.933	6
Shinnosuke Oka	Parallel bars	—N/a				15.300	—N/a	15.300	3 Q	—N/a				15.300	—N/a	15.300	3rd place, bronze medalist(s)
Wataru Tanigawa	Parallel bars	—N/a				15.000	—N/a	15.000	8 Q	—N/a				14.133	—N/a	14.133	6
Takaaki Sugino	Horizontal bar	—N/a					14.733	14.733	3 Q	—N/a					12.266	12.266	7
Shinnosuke Oka	Horizontal bar	—N/a					14.533	14.533	5 Q	—N/a					14.533	14.533	1st place, gold medalist(s)

Women
Team

Athlete	Event	Qualification						Final					
Athlete	Event	Apparatus				Total	Rank	Apparatus				Total	Rank
Athlete	Event	V	UB	BB	F	Total	Rank	V	UB	BB	F	Total	Rank
Rina Kishi	Team	14.033	13.566	13.5	13.6	54.699	10 Q	13.966	13.600	13.466	13.433	—N/a	
Haruka Nakamura	Team	13.066	13.6	13.6	13.266	53.532	17 Q	12.966	12.433	12.800	13.233	—N/a	
Mana Okamura	Team	13.033	13.266	13.633	13.2	53.132	19	—N/a	13.100	13.700	12.933	—N/a	
Kohane Ushioku	Team	13.866	12.833	12.866	12.566	52.131	27	13.833	—N/a			—N/a	
Total	Team	40.965	40.432	40.733	40.066	162.196	5 Q	40.765	39.133	39.966	39.599	159.463	8

Individual finals

Athlete	Event	Qualification						Final					
Athlete	Event	Apparatus				Total	Rank	Apparatus				Total	Rank
Athlete	Event	V	UB	BB	F	Total	Rank	V	UB	BB	F	Total	Rank
Rina Kishi	All-around	See team results above						13.766	13.833	13.133	13.233	53.965	11
Haruka Nakamura	All-around	See team results above						12.833	13.933	13.700	12.633	53.099	15
Rina Kishi	Floor	—N/a			13.6	13.6	8 Q	—N/a			13.166	13.166	7

=== Trampoline ===
Japan qualified two gymnasts: one for men's trampoline by finishing in the top five eligible nations at the 2023 World Championships in Birmingham, United Kingdom, and one for women's trampoline through the final ranking of 2023–2024 Trampoline World Cup series.

Athlete	Event	Qualification		Final	
Athlete	Event	Score	Rank	Score	Rank
Ryusei Nishioka	Men's	35.750	16	Did not advance	
Hikaru Mori	Women's	55.150	6 Q	54.740	6

== Handball ==
Summary

Key:

- ET: After extra time
- P – Match decided by penalty-shootout.

Team	Event	Group Stage						Quarterfinal	Semifinal	Final / BM	
Team	Event	Opposition Score	Opposition Score	Opposition Score	Opposition Score	Opposition Score	Rank	Opposition Score	Opposition Score	Opposition Score	Rank
Japan men's	Men's tournament	Croatia; L 29–30	Germany; L 26–37	Spain; L 33–37	Slovenia; L 28–29	Sweden; L 27–40	6	Did not advance			11

=== Men's tournament ===
Japan men's national handball team qualified for the Olympics by winning the final match against Bahrain at the 2023 Asian Men's Handball Qualification for the 2024 Olympic Games in Doha, Qatar.

Team roster

A 19-player roster was announced on 7 June 2024. The final roster was revealed on 28 June 2024.

Head coach: (Spain) Antonio Carlos Ortega

No.	Pos.	Name	Date of birth (age)	Height	App.	Goals	Club
1	GK	Takumi Nakamura	2 August 1996 (aged 27)	1.90 m	34	1	(Japan) Toyoda Gosei Blue Falcon
2	CB	Kosuke Yasuhira	29 June 2000 (aged 24)	1.72 m	15	61	(North Macedonia) RK Vardar
4	RW	Tomoya Sakurai	18 October 1999 (aged 24)	1.90 m	0	0	(Japan) Toyota Auto Body Brave Kings
9	LW	Naoki Sugioka	18 April 1994 (aged 30)	1.77 m	67	129	(Japan) Toyota Auto Body Brave Kings
13	P	Shuichi Yoshida	26 March 2001 (aged 23)	1.93 m	39	84	(France) HBC Nantes
15	LB	Adam Yuki Baig	12 April 1999 (aged 25)	1.95 m	78	191	(Japan) Zeekstar Tokyo
19	RB	Shinnosuke Tokuda	6 December 1995 (aged 28)	1.78 m	92	297	(Saudi Arabia) Khaleej Club
20	RB	Jin Watanabe	17 January 1990 (aged 34)	1.83 m	125	393	(Japan) Toyota Auto Body Brave Kings
21	GK	Daisuke Okamoto	29 March 1995 (aged 29)	1.90 m	7	0	(Japan) Toyota Auto Body Brave Kings
25	RW	Hiroki Motoki	14 February 1992 (aged 32)	1.82 m	119	342	(Japan) Zeekstar Tokyo
27	P	Hiroyasu Tamakawa	27 April 1995 (aged 29)	2.00 m	86	80	(Japan) Zeekstar Tokyo
31	LB	Tatsuki Yoshino	13 July 1994 (aged 30)	1.83 m	75	267	(Japan) Toyota Auto Body Brave Kings
39	CB	Naoki Fujisaka	1 July 2002 (aged 22)	1.80 m	0	0	(Japan) Nippon Sport Science Univ.
44	LW	Sota Takano	19 August 1998 (aged 25)	1.93 m	30	22	(Japan) Toyota Auto Body Brave Kings

Group play

Pos	Team	Pld	W	D	L	GF	GA	GD	Pts	Qualification
1	Germany	5	4	0	1	162	144	+18	8	Quarterfinals
2	Slovenia	5	3	0	2	140	142	−2	6 (Note: Slovenia 2 Pts, +2 GD; Spain 2 Pts, 0 GD; Sweden 2 Pts, −2 GD.)	Quarterfinals
3	Spain	5	3	0	2	151	148	+3	6	Quarterfinals
4	Sweden	5	3	0	2	158	139	+19	6	Quarterfinals
5	Croatia	5	2	0	3	148	156	−8	4	
6	Japan	5	0	0	5	143	173	−30	0	

Source: Olympics Paris 2024 rankings
Rules for classification: 1) Points; 2) Head-to-head points; 3) Head-to-head goal difference; 4) Head-to-head goals scored; 5) Goal difference; 6) Goals scored; 7) Draw.
Notes:

27 July 2024; 14:00	Croatia	30–29	Japan	Paris Expo Porte de Versailles, Paris; Attendance: 5,749; Referees: Jørum, Kleven (NOR)
27 July 2024; 14:00	Šoštarič 6	(13–18)	Yasuhira 10	Paris Expo Porte de Versailles, Paris; Attendance: 5,749; Referees: Jørum, Kleven (NOR)
27 July 2024; 14:00	3× (suspension)	Report	4× (suspension)	Paris Expo Porte de Versailles, Paris; Attendance: 5,749; Referees: Jørum, Kleven (NOR)

29 July 2024; 09:00	Japan	26–37	Germany	Paris Expo Porte de Versailles, Paris; Attendance: 5,788; Referees: Bíró, Kiss (HUN)
29 July 2024; 09:00	Fujisaka 6	(10–21)	Uščins 7	Paris Expo Porte de Versailles, Paris; Attendance: 5,788; Referees: Bíró, Kiss (HUN)
29 July 2024; 09:00	3× (suspension)	Report	1× (suspension)	Paris Expo Porte de Versailles, Paris; Attendance: 5,788; Referees: Bíró, Kiss (HUN)

31 July 2024; 14:00	Spain	37–33	Japan	Paris Expo Porte de Versailles, Paris; Attendance: 5,813; Referees: Pavićević, Ražnatović (MNE)
31 July 2024; 14:00	Odriozola 6	(20–18)	Fujisaka, Yasuhira 7	Paris Expo Porte de Versailles, Paris; Attendance: 5,813; Referees: Pavićević, Ražnatović (MNE)
31 July 2024; 14:00	1× (yellow card)	Report	1× (yellow card) 1× (suspension)	Paris Expo Porte de Versailles, Paris; Attendance: 5,813; Referees: Pavićević, Ražnatović (MNE)

2 August 2024; 19:00	Japan	28–29	Slovenia	Paris Expo Porte de Versailles, Paris; Attendance: 5,652; Referees: Hansen, Madsen (DEN)
2 August 2024; 19:00	Yasuhira 8	(15–15)	Vlah 14	Paris Expo Porte de Versailles, Paris; Attendance: 5,652; Referees: Hansen, Madsen (DEN)
2 August 2024; 19:00	7× (suspension)	Report	1× (yellow card) 6× (suspension)	Paris Expo Porte de Versailles, Paris; Attendance: 5,652; Referees: Hansen, Madsen (DEN)

4 August 2024; 09:00	Sweden	40–27	Japan	Paris Expo Porte de Versailles, Paris; Attendance: 5,808; Referees: Schulze, Tönnies (GER)
4 August 2024; 09:00	Karlsson 6	(16–9)	Sugioka 9	Paris Expo Porte de Versailles, Paris; Attendance: 5,808; Referees: Schulze, Tönnies (GER)
4 August 2024; 09:00	2× (suspension)	Report	2× (suspension)	Paris Expo Porte de Versailles, Paris; Attendance: 5,808; Referees: Schulze, Tönnies (GER)

== Judo ==
Japan judoka have qualified all fourteen quota places (seven in each gender) for the Games.

Men

Athlete	Event	Round of 32	Round of 16	Quarterfinals	Semifinals	Repechage	Final / BM	
Athlete	Event	Opposition Result	Opposition Result	Opposition Result	Opposition Result	Opposition Result	Opposition Result	Rank
Ryuju Nagayama	–60 kg	Bye	Augusto (BRA); W 10–00	Garrigós (ESP); L 00–10	—N/a	Yang Y-w (TPE); W 01–00	Yıldız (TUR); W 10–00	3rd place, bronze medalist(s)
Hifumi Abe	–66 kg	Bye	Pongrácz (HUN); W 10–00	Emomali (TJK); W 10–00	Vieru (MDA); W 01–00	—N/a	Lima (BRA); W 10–00	1st place, gold medalist(s)
Soichi Hashimoto	–73 kg	Bye	Hristov (BUL); W 01–00	Gaba (FRA); L 00–10	—N/a	Erdenebayar (MGL); W 10–00	Gjakova (KOS); W 01–00	3rd place, bronze medalist(s)
Takanori Nagase	–81 kg	Aprahamian (URU); W 10–00	Albayrak (TUR); W 01–00	Casse (BEL); W 01–00	Esposito (ITA); W 10–00	—N/a	Grigalashvili (GEO); W 11–00	1st place, gold medalist(s)
Sanshiro Murao	–90 kg	Bye	Kaljulaid (EST); W 10–00	Grigorian (UAE); W 10–00	Ngayap (FRA); W 11–00	—N/a	Bekauri (GEO); L 01–10	2nd place, silver medalist(s)
Aaron Wolf	–100 kg	Fara (AUT); W 10–00	Fonseca (POR); W 10–00	Sulamanidze (GEO); L 00–01	—N/a	Sherazadishvili (ESP); L 00–10	Did not advance	7
Tatsuru Saito	+100 kg	Bye	Krpálek (CZE); W 10–00	Granda (CUB); W 01–00	Min-jong (KOR); L 00–10	—N/a	Yusupov (UZB); L 00–11	5

Women

Athlete	Event	Round of 32	Round of 16	Quarterfinals	Semifinals	Repechage	Final / BM	
Athlete	Event	Opposition Result	Opposition Result	Opposition Result	Opposition Result	Opposition Result	Opposition Result	Rank
Natsumi Tsunoda	–48 kg	Ferreira (BRA); W 11–00	Whitebooi (RSA); W 11–00	Boukli (FRA); W 10–00	Babulfath (SWE); W 10–00	—N/a	Baasankhüü (MGL); W 01–00	1st place, gold medalist(s)
Uta Abe	–52 kg	Deguchi (CAN); W 10–00	Keldiyorova (UZB); L 01–10	Did not advance				9
Haruka Funakubo	–57 kg	Toniolo (ITA); W 01–00	Bilodid (UKR); W 10–00	Cysique (FRA); L 00–10	—N/a	Perišić (SRB); W 10–00	Silva (BRA); W 10–00	3rd place, bronze medalist(s)
Miku Takaichi	–63 kg	del Toro (CUB); W 10–00	Krišto (CRO); L 00–01	Did not advance				9
Saki Niizoe	–70 kg	Bye	Matniyazova (UZB); W 10–00	van Dijke (NED); L 00–01	—N/a	Tsunoda (ESP); L 00–10	Did not advance	7
Rika Takayama	–78 kg	Bye	Kurbanbaeva (UZB); W 10–00	Wagner (GER); L 00–10	—N/a	Steenhuis (NED); W 10–00	Sampaio (POR); L 00–10	5
Akira Sone	+78 kg	Soppi Mbella (CMR); W 10–00	Shiyan (CHN); W 01–00	Özdemir (TUR); L 00–01	—N/a	Žabić (SRB); DNS	Did not advance	7

Mixed

Nations qualifying at least one athlete in the −57 (−48, −52 & −57), −70 (−57, −63 & −70) & +70 (−70, −78 & +78) weight categories for women, and at least one athlete in the −73 (−60, −66 & −73), −90 (−73, −81 & −90) & +90 (−90, −100 & +100) weight categories for men, would compete in the team event.

Athlete	Event	Round of 32	Round of 16	Quarterfinals	Semifinals	Repechage	Final / BM	
Athlete	Event	Opposition Result	Opposition Result	Opposition Result	Opposition Result	Opposition Result	Opposition Result	Rank
Uta Abe; Soichi Hashimoto; Miku Takaichi; Sanshiro Murao; Rika Takayama; Tatsuru Saito; Miku Takaichi	Team	Bye	Spain; W 4–3	Serbia; W 4–1	Germany; W 4–0	—N/a	France; L 3–4	2nd place, silver medalist(s)

== Modern pentathlon ==
Japanese modern pentathletes confirmed two quota place for Paris 2024. Taishu Sato and Misaki Uchida secured their spots in their respective gender events by virtue of top five eligible nation's through the 2022 Asian Games in Hangzhou, China.

Athlete	Event	Fencing ranking round (Épée one touch)		Semifinal								Final								
Athlete	Event	Fencing ranking round (Épée one touch)		FBR	Swimming (200 m freestyle)		Riding (Show jumping)		Shooting / Running (10 m laser pistol / 3000 m cross-country)		Total	FBR	Swimming		Riding (Show jumping)		Shooting / Running		Total	
Athlete	Event	V – D	MP points	Time	MP points	BP	Time	MP points	Time	MP Points	MP points	BP	Time	MP points	Time	MP points	Time	MP Points	Pts	Rank
Taishu Sato	Men's	21–14	230	2	2:04.93	301	61.80	300	10:18.02	682	1515	2	2:04.21	302	59.21	300	9:52.85	708	1542	2nd place, silver medalist(s)
Misaki Uchida	Women's	15–20	200	0	2:08.56	293	58.25	293	12:10.13	570	1356	Did not advance								

== Rowing ==
Japanese rowers qualified boats in the following classes through the 2023 World Rowing Championships in Belgrade, Serbia; and 2024 Asian & Oceania Qualification Regatta in Chungju, South Korea.

Athlete	Event	Heats		Repechage		Quarterfinals		Semifinals		Final	
Athlete	Event	Time	Rank	Time	Rank	Time	Rank	Time	Rank	Time	Rank
Ryuta Arakawa	Men's single sculls	6:51.59	2 QF	Bye		6:54.17	3 SA/B	6:51.13	4 FB	6:47.02	9
Naoki Furuta; Masayuki Miyaura	Men's lightweight double sculls	6:52.58	5 R	7:04.48	5 FC	Did not advance				6:30.93	14
Emi Hirouchi; Ayami Oishi	Women's lightweight double sculls	7:39.17	5 R	7:31.14	5 FC	Did not advance				7:14.00	15

Qualification Legend: FA=Final A (medal); FB=Final B (non-medal); FC=Final C (non-medal); FD=Final D (non-medal); FE=Final E (non-medal); FF=Final F (non-medal); SA/B=Semifinals A/B; SC/D=Semifinals C/D; SE/F=Semifinals E/F; QF=Quarterfinals; R=Repechage

== Rugby sevens ==
Summary

Team	Event	Pool round				Quarterfinal	Semifinal / Cl.	Final / BM / Cl.	
Team	Event	Opposition Result	Opposition Result	Opposition Result	Rank	Opposition Result	Opposition Result	Opposition Result	Rank
Japan men's	Men's tournament	New Zealand; L 12–40	Ireland; L 5–40	South Africa; L 5–49	4	—N/a	Samoa; L 7–42	Uruguay; L 10–21	12
Japan women's	Women's tournament	United States; L 7–36	France; L 0–49	Brazil; W 39–12	3	—N/a	South Africa; W 15–12	Brazil; W 38–7	9

=== Men's tournament ===
Japan national rugby sevens team qualified for the Olympics by winning the gold medal and securing an outright berth at the 2023 Asian Qualification Tournament in Osaka, Japan.

Team roster

Japan's squad of 12 players was named on 4 July 2024. Additionally, Naoki Motomura and Taichi Yoshizawa were named as traveling reserves.

Head coach: Simon Amor

No.	Player	Date of birth (age)
1	Taiga Ishida	1 October 1997 (aged 26)
2	Kippei Ishida (c)	28 April 2000 (aged 24)
3	Shotaro Tsuoka	22 March 1996 (aged 28)
4	Junya Matsumoto	17 March 2000 (aged 24)
5	Josua Kerevi	18 June 1992 (aged 32)
6	Moeki Fukushi	11 March 1999 (aged 25)
7	Kippei Taninaka	4 June 2000 (aged 24)
8	Yoshihiro Noguchi	26 December 1994 (aged 29)
9	Kazuma Ueda	4 December 2002 (aged 21)
10	Takamasa Maruo	8 January 1999 (aged 25)
11	Yu Okudaira	26 May 1999 (aged 25)
12	Yoshiyuki Koga	28 August 1998 (aged 25)

Group stage

Pos	Team	Pld	W	D	L	PF	PA	PD	Pts	Qualification
1	New Zealand	3	3	0	0	71	29	+42	9	Advance to Quarter-finals
2	Ireland	3	2	0	1	62	24	+38	7	Advance to Quarter-finals
3	South Africa	3	1	0	2	59	32	+27	5	Advance to Quarter-finals
4	Japan	3	0	0	3	22	129	−107	3	

Source: World Rugby
Rules for classification: 1) Points; 2) Head-to-head result; 3) Point difference; 4) Points scored.

24 July 2024
18:00

New Zealand	40–12	Japan
Try: Rokolisoa (2) 1' c, 8' c Fineanganofo (2) 4' m, 6' c McGarvey-Black (2) 8' c, 12' c Con: Rokolisoa (4/5) 1', 7', 8', 8'; Knewstubb (1/1) 12'	World Rugby	Try: Tsuoka 2' c Ishida 16' m Con: Taninaka (1/1) 2'

Stade de France, Paris
Attendance: 69,000
Referee: Tevita Rokovereni (Fiji)

24 July 2024
21:00

Ireland	40–5	Japan
Try: Kennedy 1' c Mullins (2) 8' c, 12' c McNulty 8' c Comerford 10' m Ward 15' c Con: Lennox (3/4) 2', 8', 9'; Roche (2/2) 12', 15'	World Rugby	Try: Tsuoka 14' m

Stade de France, Paris
Attendance: 69,000
Referee: Morné Ferreira (South Africa)

25 July 2024
16:00

South Africa	49–5	Japan
Try: Z. Davids 1' c Visser 3' c van Wyk (2) 4' c, 14' c Oosthuizen (2) 6' c, 7' c Specman 11' c Con: Leyds (5/5) 2', 3', 4', 6', 8'; Brown (2/2) 12', 14'	World Rugby	Try: Ueda 10' m

Stade de France, Paris
Attendance: 70,000
Referee: Nick Hogan (New Zealand)

9–12th place playoff semi-final

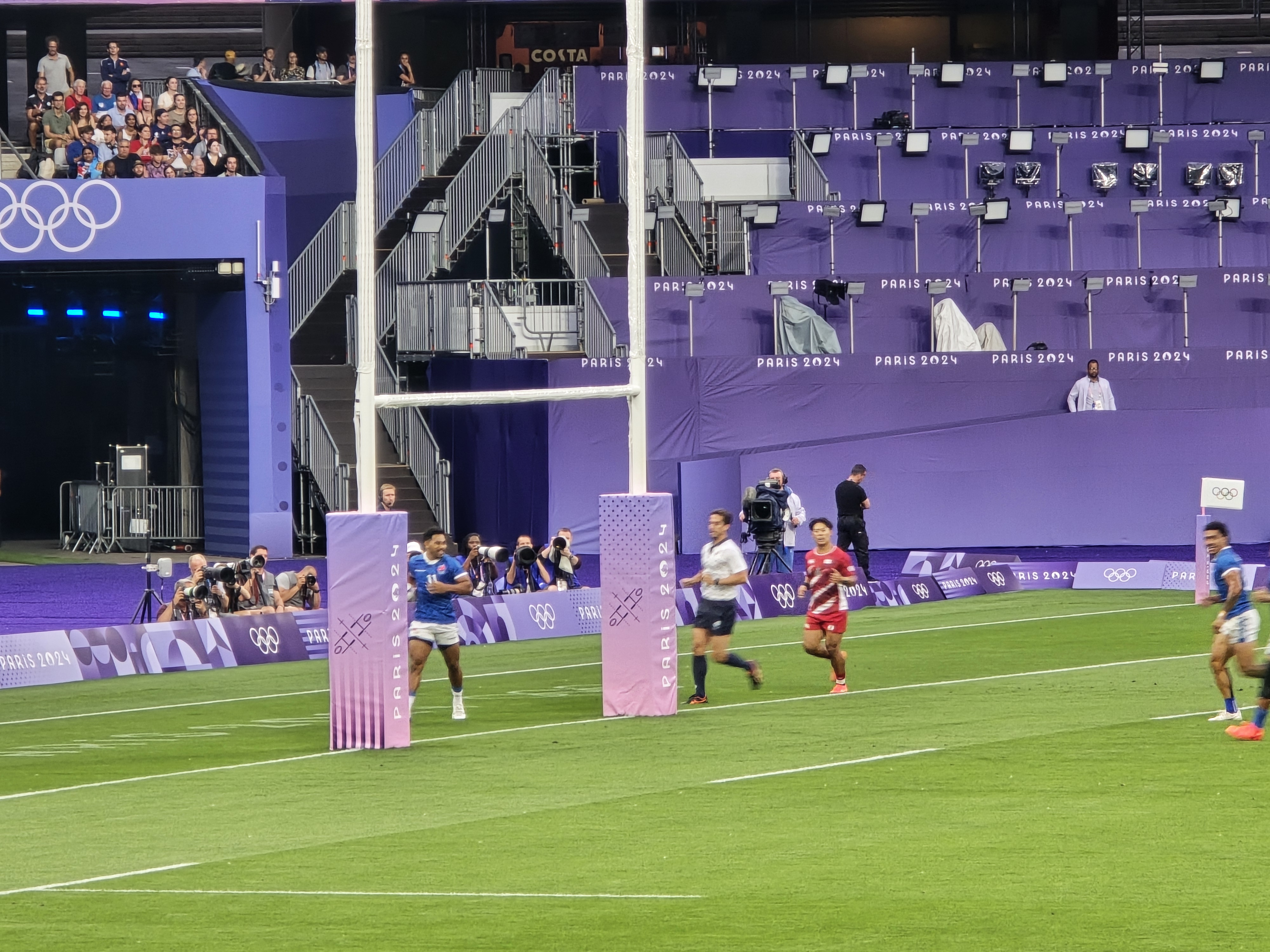
Samoa try against Japan

25 July 2024
20:00

Samoa	42–7	Japan
Try: Scanlan (2) 1' c, 3' c Apelu Maliko 9' c Leitufia 10' c Maiava 12' c Lalomilo 14' c Con: Leitufia (2/2) 1', 4'; Scanlan (2/2) 9', 11'; Maiava (1/1) 12'; Apelu Maliko 15'	World Rugby	Try: Noguchi 8' c Con: Taninaka (1/1) 9'

Stade de France, Paris
Attendance: 70,000
Referee: Gianluca Gnecchi (Italy)

Eleventh place match

27 July 2024
16:30

Japan	10–21	Uruguay
Try: Ishida 6' m Tsuoka 11' m	World Rugby	Try: González (2) 1' c, 4' c Viñals 2' c Con: Tafernaberry (3/3) 1', 3', 4'

Stade de France, Paris
Referee: Morné Ferreira (South Africa)

=== Women's tournament ===
Japan women's national rugby sevens team qualified for the Olympics by winning the gold medal and securing an outright berth at the 2023 Asian Qualification Tournament in Osaka, Japan.

Team roster

Japan's squad of 12 players was named on 4 July 2024.

Head coach: Takashi Suzuki

- Hanako Utsumi
- Mei Ohtani
- Marin Kajiki
- Chiaki Saegusa
- Emii Tanaka
- Honoka Tsutsumi
- Chiharu Nakamura
- Arisa Nishi
- Wakaba Hara
- Yume Hirano (c)
- Rinka Matsuda
- Sakura Mizutani

Group stage

Pos	Team	Pld	W	D	L	PF	PA	PD	Pts	Qualification
1	France (H)	3	3	0	0	106	14	+92	9	Quarter-finals
2	United States	3	2	0	1	74	43	+31	7	Quarter-finals
3	Japan	3	1	0	2	46	97	−51	5	
4	Brazil	3	0	0	3	17	89	−72	3	

Source: World Rugby
Rules for classification: 1) Points; 2) Head-to-head result; 3) Point difference; 4) Points scored.
(H) Hosts

28 July 2024
16:30

United States	36–7	Japan
Try: Levy 3' m Kirshe (2) 4' c, 6' m Sullivan 8' m Maher 9' c Sedrick 12' c Con: Canett (3/6) 5', 10', 13'	World Rugby	Try: Mizutani 2' c Con: Utsumi (1/1) 2'

Stade de France, Paris
Referee: George Selwood (England/Great Britain)

28 July 2024
20:30

France	49–0	Japan
Try: Jason (3) 1' c, 7' c, 9' c Grassineau 3' c Drouin 5' c Ciofani 10' c Jacquet 13' c Con: Drouin (6/6) 2', 4', 5', 8', 9', 10'; Yengo (1/1) 13'	World Rugby

Stade de France, Paris
Referee: Finlay Brown (Scotland/Great Britain)

29 July 2024
15:00

Japan	39–12	Brazil
Try: Tsutsumi (2) 1' c, 10' m Saegusa 4' c Utsumi 6' m Kajiki (2) 6' m, 9' m Tanaka 14' m Con: Nishi (1/2) 1'; Tsutsumi (1/1) 5'	World Rugby	Try: Thalita Costa 7' m Lima 13' c Con: Fioravanti (1/1) 13'

Stade de France, Paris
Referee: Maggie Cogger-Orr (New Zealand)

9–12th place playoff semi-final

29 July 2024
20:00

Japan	15–12	South Africa
Try: Hara 4' m Kajiki (2) 12' m, 14' m	World Rugby	Try: Janse van Rensburg 1' m Roos 7'; Con: Roos (1/2) 8'

Stade de France, Paris
Referee: Cisco Lopez (United States)

Ninth place match

30 July 2024
17:00

Japan	38–7	Brazil
Try: Kajiki 1' c Utsumi 3' c Ohtani 6' m Hirano 10' c Matsuda 13' c Tanaka 14' m Con: Utsumi (2/3) 1', 3'; Hirano (1/1) 10'; Nishi (1/2) 13'	World Rugby	Try: Soares 16' c Con: Kochhann (1/1) 16'

Stade de France, Paris
Referee: Lavenia Rawaca (Fiji)

== Sailing ==
Japanese sailors qualified one boat in each of the following classes through the 2023 Sailing World Championships, the class-associated Worlds, and the continental regattas.

Elimination events

Athlete	Event	Preliminary races																Quarterfinal	Semifinal	Final			
Athlete	Event	1	2	3	4	5	6	7	8	9	10	11	12	13	14	Net points	Rank	Rank	Rank	1	2	Total	Rank
Makoto Tomizawa	Men's iQFoil	6	20	3	25^{†} (BFD)	15	18	13	17	18	21^{†}	9	17	13	—N/a	149	18	Did not advance					

Medal race events

Athlete	Event	Race																Net points	Final rank
Athlete	Event	1	2	3	4	5	6	7	8	9	10	11	12	13	14	15	M*	Net points	Final rank
Misaki Tanaka; Sera Nagamatsu	Women's 49erFX	4	12	4	14	12	11	14	16	19^{†}	13	19	11	—N/a			EL	130	17
Keiju Okada; Miho Yoshioka	Mixed 470	1	2	2	6	~~14~~	12	9	3	—N/a							6	41	2nd place, silver medalist(s)
Shibuki Iitsuka; Oura Nishida Capiglia	Mixed Nacra 17	17	17	~~19~~	17	17	17	10	17	19	11	7	11	—N/a			EL	160	17

M = Medal race; EL = Eliminated – did not advance into the medal race

== Shooting ==
Japanese shooters achieved quota places for the following events based on their results at the 2022 and 2023 ISSF World Championships, 2023 and 2024 Asian Championships, and 2024 ISSF World Olympic Qualification Tournament.

Athlete	Event	Qualification		Final	
Athlete	Event	Points	Rank	Points	Rank
Naoya Okada	Men's 10 m air rifle	626.8	31	Did not advance	
Dai Yoshioka	Men's 25 m rapid fire pistol	572	28	Did not advance	
Misaki Nobata	Women's 10 m air rifle	629.9	12	Did not advance	
Naoya Okada; Misaki Nobata	Mixed 10 m air rifle team	623.6	25	Did not advance	

== Skateboarding ==
Japan entered ten skateboarders (four males and six females) to compete in each of the following events at the Games.

Men

Athlete	Event	Qualification		Final	
Athlete	Event	Score	Rank	Score	Rank
Yuro Nagahara	Park	81.38	15	Did not advance	
Ginwoo Onodera	Street	177.08	14	Did not advance	
Sora Shirai	Street	270.42	3 Q	278.12	4
Yuto Horigome	Street	270.18	4 Q	281.14	1st place, gold medalist(s)

Women

Athlete	Event	Qualification		Final	
Athlete	Event	Score	Rank	Score	Rank
Kokona Hiraki	Park	88.07	1 Q	92.63	2nd place, silver medalist(s)
Sakura Yosozumi	Park	79.70	10	Did not advance	
Hinano Kusaki	Park	85.11	3 Q	69.76	8
Coco Yoshizawa	Street	258.92	1 Q	272.75	1st place, gold medalist(s)
Liz Akama	Street	257.99	2 Q	265.95	2nd place, silver medalist(s)
Funa Nakayama	Street	245.52	5 Q	79.77	7

== Sport climbing ==
Japan entered three sport climbers into the Olympic tournament. Tomoa Narasaki and Ai Mori qualified directly for the men's and women's boulder and lead combined event, by winning the bronze medal and securing one of the three berths available at the 2023 IFSC World Championships in Bern, Switzerland. Sorato Anraku qualified for the men's boulder and lead combined event by winning the Asian Qualifier in Jakarta, Indonesia.

Boulder & lead combined

Athlete	Event	Qualification							Final						
Athlete	Event	Boulder		Lead			Total	Rank	Boulder		Lead			Total	Rank
Athlete	Event	Result	Place	Hold	Score	Place	Total	Rank	Result	Place	Hold	Score	Place	Total	Rank
Tomoa Narasaki	Men's	54.4	2		12.1	14	66.5	10	Did not advance						10
Sorato Anraku	Men's	69.0	1		68.1	2	137.1	1 Q	69.3	1		76.1	5	145.4	2nd place, silver medalist(s)
Ai Mori	Women's	54.0	11		96.1		150.1	4 Q	39.0	7		96.1	1	135.1	4
Miho Nonaka	Women's	64.4	7		51.1		115.5	9	Did not advance						9

== Surfing ==
Japanese surfers confirmed four shortboard quota places (two male and one female) for Tahiti. Tokyo 2020 silver medalist Kanoa Igarashi and rookie Shino Matsuda topped the list of eligible surfers from Asia to secure the lone available berth in their respective shortboard races at the 2023 ISA World Surfing Games in Surf City, El Salvador, while a second male Japanese surfer will soon be named to join the Japanese roster for Paris 2024, following his nation's successful triumph in the men's team event at the 2022 ISA World Surfing Games in Huntington Beach, California.

Athlete	Event	Round 1		Round 2	Round 3	Quarterfinal	Semifinal	Final / BM	
Athlete	Event	Score	Rank	Opposition Result	Opposition Result	Opposition Result	Opposition Result	Opposition Result	Rank
Kanoa Igarashi	Men's shortboard	4.17	3 R2	Fioravanti (ITA); W 13.87–7.00	Medina (BRA); L 7.04–17.40	Did not advance			
Reo Inaba	Men's shortboard	12.76	1 R3	Bye	Toledo (BRA); W 6.00–2.46	Correa (PER); L 10.16–10.60	Did not advance		
Connor O'Leary	Men's shortboard	9.93	2 R2	Elter (GER); W 14.50–6.07	Ewing (AUS); L 11.00–14.17	Did not advance			
Shino Matsuda	Women's shortboard	11.16	2 R2	Bonvalot (POR); W 9.77–6.84	Erostarbe (ESP); L 5.84–8.34	Did not advance			

Qualification legend: R3 – Qualifies to elimination rounds; R2 – Qualifies to repechage round

== Swimming ==
Japanese swimmers achieved the entry standards in the following events for Paris 2024 (a maximum of two swimmers under the Olympic Qualifying Time (OQT) and potentially at the Olympic Consideration Time (OCT)): To assure their selection to the Olympic team, swimmers must finish in the top two of each individual event under both the federation's required standard and World Aquatics A-cut at the Japanese Championships and Olympic Trials, scheduled for March 17 to 24, in Tokyo. Furthermore, Japanese swimmers must secure a direct slot on the Paris 2024 roster if they win a gold medal in any individual pool event at the 2023 World Aquatics Championships, scheduled for July 22 to 30, in Fukuoka.

Men

Athlete	Event	Heat		Semifinal		Final	
Athlete	Event	Time	Rank	Time	Rank	Time	Rank
Taishin Minamide	10 km open water	—N/a				1:56:57.3	15
Katsuhiro Matsumoto	200 m freestyle	1:46.23	7	1:45.88	8	1:46.26	8
Riku Matsuyama	100 m backstroke	54.71	31	Did not advance			
Hidekazu Takehara	200 m backstroke	1:57.23	8	1:58.03	15	Did not advance	
Taku Taniguchi	100 m breaststroke	1:00.20	19	Did not advance			
IIppei Watanabe	200 m breaststroke	2:09.86	5	2:09.62	5	2:08.83	6
Yu Hanaguruma	200 m breaststroke	2:10.35	7	2:09.72	7	2:08.79	5
Katsuhiro Matsumoto	100 m butterfly	51.43	12 Q	51.69	15	Did not advance	
Naoki Mizunuma	100 m butterfly	51.62	15 Q	51.08	8 Q	51.11	8
Genki Terakado	200 m butterfly	1:55.82	13	1:56.21	15	Did not advance	
Tomoru Honda	200 m butterfly	1:57.30	22	Did not advance			
Daiya Seto	200 m individual medley	1:57.48	1	1:56.59	5	1:57.21	7
Tomoyuki Matsushita	400 m individual medley	4:11.18	5	—N/a		4:08.62	2nd place, silver medalist(s)
Daiya Seto	400 m individual medley	4:10.92	3	—N/a		4:11.78	7
Tatsuya Murasa; Katsuhiro Matsumoto; Hidenari Mano; Konosuke Yanagimoto	4 × 200 m freestyle relay	7:08.43	8	—N/a		7:07.48	7
Riku Matsumoto; Taku Taniguchi; Naoki Mizunuma; Katsuhiro Matsumoto	4 × 100 m medley relay	3:34.84	14	—N/a		Did not advance	

Women

Athlete	Event	Heat		Semifinal		Final	
Athlete	Event	Time	Rank	Time	Rank	Time	Rank
Airi Ebina	10 km open water	—N/a				2:06:17.7	13
Waka Kobori	400 m freestyle	4:08.02	11	—N/a		Did not advance	
Satomi Suzuki	100 m breaststroke	1:06.04	4	1:06.90	12	Did not advance	
Reona Aoki	100 m breaststroke	1:06.98	19	Did not advance			
Satomi Suzuki	200 m breaststroke	2:23.80	6	2:23.54	8	2:22.54	4
Mizuki Hirai	100 m butterfly	56.71	2	56.80	7	57.19	7
Rikako Ikee	100 m butterfly	57.82	14	57.59	11	Did not advance	
Airi Mitsui	200 m butterfly	2:09.12	9	2:08.71	11	Did not advance	
Hiroko Makino	200 m butterfly	2:10.79	15	2:09.16	13	Did not advance	
Yui Ohashi	200 m individual medley	2:11.70	15 Q	2:10.94	12	Did not advance	
Shiho Matsumoto	200 m individual medley	2:11.67	14 Q	2:11.85	14	Did not advance	
Ageha Tanigawa	400 m individual medley	4:43.18	13	—N/a		Did not advance	
Mio Narita	400 m individual medley	4:37.84	5	—N/a		4:38.83	6
Nagisa Ikemoto; Waka Kobori; Hiroko Makino; Rio Shirai	4 × 200 m freestyle relay	7:58.39	9	—N/a		Did not advance	
Rio Shirai; Satomi Suzuki; Mizuki Hirai; Rikako Ikee	4 × 100 m medley relay	3:56.52	5	—N/a		3:56.17	5

== Table tennis ==
Japan entered a full squad of male and female table tennis player into the Games, by advancing to the quarter-finals round, through the 2024 World Team Table Tennis Championships in Busan, South Korea. Japan also entered one mixed doubles pair through the allocations of final world ranking.

Men

Athlete	Event	Preliminary	Round 1	Round 2	Round of 16	Quarterfinals	Semifinals	Final / BM	
Athlete	Event	Opposition Result	Opposition Result	Opposition Result	Opposition Result	Opposition Result	Opposition Result	Opposition Result	Rank
Tomokazu Harimoto	Singles	Bye	M Allegro (BEL); W 4–0	Alamiyan (IRI); W 4–2	A Lind (DEN); W 4–1	Fan (CHN); L 3–4	Did not advance		
Shunsuke Togami	Singles	Bye	Wang (CAN); W 4–0	Kožul (SLO); W 4–2	Jang (KOR); L 0–4	Did not advance			
Tomokazu Harimoto; Hiroto Shinosuka; Shunsuke Togami	Team	—N/a			Australia; W 3–0	Chinese Taipei; W 3–1	Sweden; L 2–3	France; L 2–3	4

Women

Athlete	Event	Preliminary	Round 1	Round 2	Round of 16	Quarterfinals	Semifinals	Final / BM	
Athlete	Event	Opposition Result	Opposition Result	Opposition Result	Opposition Result	Opposition Result	Opposition Result	Opposition Result	Rank
Hina Hayata	Singles	Bye	Vivarelli (ITA); W 4–0	Meshref (EGY); W 4–0	Yuan (FRA); W 4–0	Pyon (PRK); W 4–3	Sun (CHN); L 0–4	Shin (KOR); W 4–2	3rd place, bronze medalist(s)
Miu Hirano	Singles	Bye	Piccolin (ITA); W 4–0	Zhu (HKG); W 4–0	Batra (IND); W 4–1	Shin (KOR); L 3–4	Did not advance		
Hina Hayata; Miu Hirano; Miwa Harimoto	Team	—N/a			Poland; W 3–0	Thailand; W 3–0	Germany; W 3–1	China; L 0–3	2nd place, silver medalist(s)

Mixed

Athlete	Event	Round of 16	Quarterfinal	Semifinal	Final / BM	
Athlete	Event	Opposition Result	Opposition Result	Opposition Result	Opposition Result	Rank
Tomokazu Harimoto; Hina Hayata	Doubles	Ri / Kim (PRK); L 1–4	Did not advance			

== Tennis ==
Japan entered four tennis players (two men and two women) into the Olympic tournament. Two men have guaranteed their participation as one of the top-56 eligible players in the ATP World Rankings, while two women did the same as the top-56 eligible players in the WTA World Rankings, which were completed on 10 June 2024.

Men

Athlete	Event	Round of 64	Round of 32	Round of 16	Quarterfinals	Semifinals	Final / BM	
Athlete	Event	Opposition Score	Opposition Score	Opposition Score	Opposition Score	Opposition Score	Opposition Score	Rank
Kei Nishikori	Singles	Draper (GBR); L 1–6, 4–6	Did not advance					
Taro Daniel	Singles	Ruud (NOR); L 5–7, 1–6	Did not advance					
Taro Daniel; Kei Nishikori	Men's doubles	—N/a	Evans / Murray (GBR); L 6–2, 6–7^{(5–7)}, [9–11]	Did not advance				

Women

Athlete	Event	Round of 64	Round of 32	Round of 16	Quarterfinals	Semifinals	Final / BM	
Athlete	Event	Opposition Score	Opposition Score	Opposition Score	Opposition Score	Opposition Score	Opposition Score	Rank
Naomi Osaka	Singles	Kerber (GER); L 5–7, 3–6	Did not advance					
Moyuka Uchijima	Singles	Svitolina (UKR); L 2–6, 1–6	Did not advance					
Shuko Aoyama; Ena Shibahara	Women's doubles	—N/a	Bogdan / Cristian (ROU); W 6–2, 6–3	Krejčíková / Siniaková (CZE); L 5–7, 4–6	Did not advance			

Mixed

Athlete	Event	Round of 16	Quarterfinals	Semifinals	Final / BM	
Athlete	Event	Opposition Score	Opposition Score	Opposition Score	Opposition Score	Rank
Ena Shibahara; Kei Nishikori	Doubles	Garcia / Roger-Vasselin (FRA); W 6–4, 3–6, [10–7]	Siniaková / Macháč (CZE); L 5–7, 2–6	Did not advance		

== Triathlon ==
Japan entered three triathletes (two men's and one women's) in the triathlon events for Paris, following the release of final individual Olympics qualification ranking.

Individual

Athlete	Event	Time				Rank
Athlete	Event	Swim (1.5 km)	Bike (40 km)	Run (10 km)	Total	Rank
Kenji Nener	Men's	20:36	51:58	31:13	1:45:02	15
Makoto Odakura	Men's	21:36	54:24	32:55	1:50:15	41
Yuko Takahashi	Women's	24:11	1:00:35	36:33	2:02:42	40

== Volleyball ==
=== Beach ===
Japan women's pair qualified for Paris after winning the 2024 AVC Continental Cup Final in Ningbo, China.

Athletes	Event	Preliminary round				Round of 16	Quarterfinal	Semifinal	Final / BM	
Athletes	Event	Opposition Score	Opposition Score	Opposition Score	Rank	Opposition Score	Opposition Score	Opposition Score	Opposition Score	Rank
Akiko Hasegawa; Miki Ishii	Women's	Carol / Bárbara (BRA); L 0–2 (12–21, 19–21)	Stam / Schoon (NED); L 0–2 (16–21, 14–21)	Paulikienė / Raupelytė (LTU); W (21–11, 21–5)	3	Ana Patricia / Duda (BRA); L 0–2 (15–21, 16–21)	Did not advance			9

=== Indoor ===
Summary

Team	Event	Group stage				Quarterfinal	Semifinal	Final / BM	
Team	Event	Opposition Score	Opposition Score	Opposition Score	Rank	Opposition Score	Opposition Score	Opposition Score	Rank
Japan men's	Men's tournament	Germany; L 2–3	Argentina; W 3–1	United States; L 1–3	3	Italy; L 2–3	Did not advance		7
Japan women's	Women's tournament	Poland; L 1–3	Brazil; L 0–3	Kenya; W 3–0	3	Did not advance			9

==== Men's tournament ====
Japan men's volleyball team qualified for Paris by securing an outright berth as one of the two highest-ranked nations at the Olympic Qualification Tournament in Tokyo, Japan.

Team roster

The roster was announced on 24 June 2024.

Head coach: (France) Philippe Blain

- 1 Yuji Nishida OP
- 2 Taishi Onodera MB
- 3 Akihiro Fukatsu S
- 4 Kento Miyaura OH
- 5 Tatsunori Otsuka OH
- 6 Akihiro Yamauchi MB
- 8 Masahiro Sekita S
- 10 Kentaro Takahashi MB
- 12 Ran Takahashi OH
- 14 Yūki Ishikawa (c) OH
- 15 Masato Kai OH
- 20 Tomohiro Yamamoto L

Group play

Pos	Team	Pld	W	L	Pts	SW	SL	SR	SPW	SPL	SPR	Qualification
1	United States	3	3	0	8	9	3	3.000	270	232	1.164	Quarterfinals
2	Germany	3	2	1	6	8	5	1.600	287	264	1.087	Quarterfinals
3	Japan	3	1	2	4	6	7	0.857	278	292	0.952	Quarterfinals
4	Argentina	3	0	3	0	1	9	0.111	196	243	0.807	

Source: Olympics
Rules for classification: Tiebreakers

27 July 2024; 09:00	Japan	2–3	Germany	South Paris Arena 1, Paris; Attendance: 9,897; Referees: Fabrice Collados (FRA), Denny Cespedes (DOM)
27 July 2024; 09:00	(17–25, 25–23, 25–20, 28–30, 12–15); P2 Report			South Paris Arena 1, Paris; Attendance: 9,897; Referees: Fabrice Collados (FRA), Denny Cespedes (DOM)

31 July 2024; 13:00	Japan	3–1	Argentina	South Paris Arena 1, Paris; Attendance: 9,474; Referees: Wojciech Maroszek (POL), Vladimir Simonović (SUI)
31 July 2024; 13:00	(25–16, 25–22, 18–25, 25–23); P2 Report			South Paris Arena 1, Paris; Attendance: 9,474; Referees: Wojciech Maroszek (POL), Vladimir Simonović (SUI)

2 August 2024; 21:00	Japan	1–3	United States	South Paris Arena 1, Paris; Attendance: 9,369; Referees: Ivaylo Ivanov (BUL), Juraj Mokrý (SVK)
2 August 2024; 21:00	(16–25, 18–25, 25–18, 19–25); P2 Report			South Paris Arena 1, Paris; Attendance: 9,369; Referees: Ivaylo Ivanov (BUL), Juraj Mokrý (SVK)

Quarterfinal

5 August 2024; 13:00	Italy	3–2	Japan	South Paris Arena 1, Paris; Attendance: 9,166; Referees: Ivaylo Ivanov (BUL), Wojciech Maroszek (POL)
5 August 2024; 13:00	(20–25, 23–25, 27–25, 26–24, 17–15); P2 Report			South Paris Arena 1, Paris; Attendance: 9,166; Referees: Ivaylo Ivanov (BUL), Wojciech Maroszek (POL)

==== Women's tournament ====
Japan women's volleyball team qualified for Paris 2024 as one of five highest ranked eligible team in the World Ranking qualification.

Team roster

The roster was announced on 1 July 2024.

Head coach: Masayoshi Manabe

- 1 Koyomi Iwasaki S
- 2 Kotona Hayashi OH
- 3 Sarina Koga (c) OH
- 4 Mayu Ishikawa OH
- 6 Nanami Seki S
- 8 Manami Kojima L
- 10 Arisa Inoue OH
- 11 Nichika Yamada MB
- 12 Satomi Fukudome L
- 15 Airi Miyabe MB
- 20 Ayaka Araki MB
- 21 Yukiko Wada OH

Group play

Pos	Team	Pld	W	L	Pts	SW	SL	SR	SPW	SPL	SPR	Qualification
1	Brazil	3	3	0	9	9	0	MAX	238	165	1.442	Quarter-finals
2	Poland	3	2	1	6	6	4	1.500	244	230	1.061	Quarter-finals
3	Japan	3	1	2	3	4	6	0.667	226	224	1.009	
4	Kenya	3	0	3	0	0	9	0.000	136	225	0.604	

Source: Olympics
Rules for classification: Tiebreakers

28 July 2024; 13:00	Poland	3–1	Japan	South Paris Arena 1, Paris; Attendance: 9,162; Referees: Karina Rene (ARG), Wang Ziling (CHN)
28 July 2024; 13:00	(20–25, 25–22, 25–23, 28–26); P2 Report			South Paris Arena 1, Paris; Attendance: 9,162; Referees: Karina Rene (ARG), Wang Ziling (CHN)

1 August 2024; 13:00	Brazil	3–0	Japan	South Paris Arena 1, Paris; Attendance: 9,410; Referees: Epaminondas Gerothodoros (GRE), Nurper Özbar (TUR)
1 August 2024; 13:00	(25–20, 25–17, 25–18); P2 Report			South Paris Arena 1, Paris; Attendance: 9,410; Referees: Epaminondas Gerothodoros (GRE), Nurper Özbar (TUR)

3 August 2024; 13:00	Japan	3–0	Kenya	South Paris Arena 1, Paris; Attendance: 9,439; Referees: Hamid Al-Rousi (UAE), Angela Grass (BRA)
3 August 2024; 13:00	(25–17, 25–22, 25–12); P2 Report			South Paris Arena 1, Paris; Attendance: 9,439; Referees: Hamid Al-Rousi (UAE), Angela Grass (BRA)

== Water polo ==
Summary

Key:
- FT – After full time.
- P – Match decided by penalty-shootout.

Team	Event	Group stage						Quarterfinal	Semifinal	Final / BM	
Team	Event	Opposition Score	Opposition Score	Opposition Score	Opposition Score	Opposition Score	Rank	Opposition Score	Opposition Score	Opposition Score	Rank
Japan's men's	Men's tournament	Serbia; L 15–16	France; L 13–14	Hungary; L 10–17	Spain; L 8–23	Australia; W 14–13	6	Did not advance			11

=== Men's tournament ===
Japan men's national water polo team qualified for the Olympics after winning the gold medal at the 2022 Asian Games in Hangzhou, China.

Team roster

The roster was announced on 16 July 2024.

Head coach: Shiota Yoshinori

- 1 Katsuyuki Tanamura GK
- 2 Seiya Adachi W
- 3 Taiyo Watanabe D
- 4 Daichi Ogihara D
- 5 Kai Inoue W
- 6 Toi Suzuki (c) W
- 7 Kiyomu Date W
- 8 Mitsuru Takata CB
- 9 Ikkei Nitta D
- 10 Yusuke Inaba W
- 11 Keigo Okawa W
- 12 Kenta Araki CF
- 13 Towa Nishimura GK

Group play

Pos	Team	Pld	W	PSW	PSL	L	GF	GA	GD	Pts	Qualification
1	Spain	5	5	0	0	0	67	39	+28	15	Quarterfinals
2	Australia	5	3	0	0	2	44	42	+2	9 (Note: Australia 9–8 Hungary)	Quarterfinals
3	Hungary	5	3	0	0	2	62	54	+8	9	Quarterfinals
4	Serbia	5	2	0	0	3	58	63	−5	6	Quarterfinals
5	France (H)	5	1	0	0	4	50	60	−10	3 (Note: France 14–13 Japan)	
6	Japan	5	1	0	0	4	60	83	−23	3	

Source: Olympics
Rules for classification: 1) Points; 2) Head-to-head points; 3) Head-to-head goal difference; 4) Head-to-head goals scored; 5) Goal difference.
(H) Host
Notes:

28 July 2024; 12:05 v	Report	Serbia	16–15	Japan	Paris Aquatic Centre, Paris; Referees: Rafaele Colombo (ITA), Veselin Mišković (MNE)
28 July 2024; 12:05 v	Report	Score by quarters: 4–4, 3–4, 5–3, 4–4			Paris Aquatic Centre, Paris; Referees: Rafaele Colombo (ITA), Veselin Mišković (MNE)
28 July 2024; 12:05 v	Report	Mandić 7	Goals	Inaba 6	Paris Aquatic Centre, Paris; Referees: Rafaele Colombo (ITA), Veselin Mišković (MNE)

30 July 2024; 15:00 v	Report	Japan	13–14	France	Paris Aquatic Centre, Paris; Referees: Georgios Stavridis (GRE), Darren Spiritosanto (USA)
30 July 2024; 15:00 v	Report	Score by quarters: 4–4, 2–3, 3–3, 4–4			Paris Aquatic Centre, Paris; Referees: Georgios Stavridis (GRE), Darren Spiritosanto (USA)
30 July 2024; 15:00 v	Report	Inaba 6	Goals	Bodegas 3	Paris Aquatic Centre, Paris; Referees: Georgios Stavridis (GRE), Darren Spiritosanto (USA)

1 August 2024; 21:05 v	Report	Hungary	17–10	Japan	Paris Aquatic Centre, Paris; Referees: Frank Ohme (GER), Zhang Liang (CHN)
1 August 2024; 21:05 v	Report	Score by quarters: 5–2, 4–2, 3–2, 5–4			Paris Aquatic Centre, Paris; Referees: Frank Ohme (GER), Zhang Liang (CHN)
1 August 2024; 21:05 v	Report	Vigvári 4	Goals	Watanabe 3	Paris Aquatic Centre, Paris; Referees: Frank Ohme (GER), Zhang Liang (CHN)

3 August 2024; 10:30 v	Report	Spain	23–8	Japan	Paris Aquatic Centre, Paris; Referees: Michiel Zwart (NED), Darren Spiritosanto (USA)
3 August 2024; 10:30 v	Report	Score by quarters: 4–0, 6–2, 7–4, 6–2			Paris Aquatic Centre, Paris; Referees: Michiel Zwart (NED), Darren Spiritosanto (USA)
3 August 2024; 10:30 v	Report	Sanahuja 5	Goals	Okawa 2	Paris Aquatic Centre, Paris; Referees: Michiel Zwart (NED), Darren Spiritosanto (USA)

5 August 2024; 13:35 v	Report	Australia	13–14	Japan	Paris La Défense Arena, Paris; Referees: Rafaele Colombo (ITA), Darren Spiritosanto (USA)
5 August 2024; 13:35 v	Report	Score by quarters: 5–2, 2–4, 2–4, 4–4			Paris La Défense Arena, Paris; Referees: Rafaele Colombo (ITA), Darren Spiritosanto (USA)
5 August 2024; 13:35 v	Report	Maksimovic 3	Goals	Inaba 6	Paris La Défense Arena, Paris; Referees: Rafaele Colombo (ITA), Darren Spiritosanto (USA)

== Weightlifting ==
Japan entered three weightlifters into the Olympic competition. Masanori Miyamoto (men's 73 kg), Eishiro Murakami (men's +102 kg) and Rira Suzuki (women's 49 kg) secured one of the top ten slots in their respective weight divisions based on the IWF Olympic Qualification Rankings.

Athlete	Event	Snatch		Clean & Jerk		Total	Rank
Athlete	Event	Result	Rank	Result	Rank	Total	Rank
Masanori Miyamoto	Men's −73 kg	151	6	187	6	338	6
Eishiro Murakami	Men's +102 kg	180	10	220	10	400	10
Rira Suzuki	Women's −49 kg	83	8	108	6	191	8

== Wrestling ==
Japan qualified fourteen wrestlers for each of the following classes into the Olympic competition. Ten of them qualified for the games by virtue of top five results through the 2023 World Championships in Belgrade, Serbia; meanwhile, the other three wrestlers qualified for the games, by virtue of their victory in their semifinal results, at the 2024 Asian Olympic Qualification Tournament in Bishkek, Kyrgyzstan, Yuri Nakazato received a spot due to the reallocations of Individual Neutral Athletes quotas.

Key:

- VT (ranking points: 5–0 or 0–5) – Victory by fall.
- VB (ranking points: 5–0 or 0–5) – Victory by injury (VF for forfeit, VA for withdrawal or disqualification)
- PP (ranking points: 3–1 or 1–3) – Decision by points – the loser with technical points.
- PO (ranking points: 3–0 or 0–3) – Decision by points – the loser without technical points.
- ST (ranking points: 4–0 or 0–4) – Great superiority – the loser without technical points and a margin of victory of at least 8 (Greco-Roman) or 10 (freestyle) points.
- SP (ranking points: 4–1 or 1–4) – Technical superiority – the loser with technical points and a margin of victory of at least 8 (Greco-Roman) or 10 (freestyle) points.

Freestyle

Athlete	Event	Round of 16	Quarterfinal	Semifinal	Repechage	Final / BM	
Athlete	Event	Opposition Result	Opposition Result	Opposition Result	Opposition Result	Opposition Result	Rank
Rei Higuchi	Men's −57 kg	Sarlak (IRI); W 5–0 ^{VF}	Cruz (PUR); W 4–1 ^{SP}	Sehrawat (IND); W 10–0	—N/a	Lee (USA); W 4–2	1st place, gold medalist(s)
Kotaro Kiyooka	Men's −65 kg	Saculțan (MDA); W 10–0	Rivera (PUR); W 8–6	Tulga (MGL); W 5–1	—N/a	Amouzad (IRI); W 10–3	1st place, gold medalist(s)
Daichi Takatani	Men's −74 kg	Garzón (CUB); W 10–0	Tsabolov (SRB); W 10–0	Dake (USA); W 20–12	—N/a	Zhamalov (UZB); L 0–5	2nd place, silver medalist(s)
Hayato Ishiguro	Men's −86 kg	Benferdjallah (ALG); W 4–0 ^{ST}	Brooks (USA); L 1–4 ^{SP}	Did not advance			
Yui Susaki	Women's −50 kg	Vinesh (IND); L 1–3 ^{PP}	Did not advance			Livach (UKR); W 4–0 ^{ST}	3rd place, bronze medalist(s)
Akari Fujinami	Women's −53 kg	Parrish (USA); W 5–0 ^{VT}	Khulan (MGL); W 5–0 ^{VT}	Pang (CHN); W 4–0 ^{ST}	—N/a	Yépez (ECU); W 10–0 ^{SP}	1st place, gold medalist(s)
Tsugumi Sakurai	Women's −57 kg	Taylor (CAN); W 3–1 ^{PP}	Valverde (ECU); W 11–0 ^{VT}	Maroulis (USA); W 10–4	—N/a	Nichita (MDA); W 6–0	1st place, gold medalist(s)
Sakura Motoki	Women's −62 kg	Incze (ROU); W 4–0^{F}	Godinez (CAN); W 11–0	Bullen (NOR); W 7–7^{F}	—N/a	Koliadenko (UKR); W 12–1	1st place, gold medalist(s)
Nonoka Ozaki	Women's −68 kg	Caraballo (VEN); W 4–0 ^{ST}	Zhumanazarova (KGZ); L 1–3 ^{PP}	Did not advance	Delgermaa (MGL); W 3–0 ^{PO}	Oborududu (NGR); W 3–0 ^{PO}	3rd place, bronze medalist(s)
Yuka Kagami	Women's −76 kg	Reasco (ECU); W 2–0 ^{PO}	Yiğit (TUR); W 3–0 ^{PO}	Rentería (COL); W 4–2 ^{PP}	Bye	Blades (USA); W 3–1	1st place, gold medalist(s)

Greco-Roman

Athlete	Event	Round of 16	Quarterfinals	Semifinals	Repechage	Final / BM	
Athlete	Event	Opposition Result	Opposition Result	Opposition Result	Opposition Result	Opposition Result	Rank
Kenichiro Fumita	Men's −60 kg	de Armas (CUB); W 4–1 ^{SP}	Mohsennejad (IRI); W 4–0 ^{ST}	Sharshenbekov (KGZ); W 3–1 ^{PP}	—N/a	Cao (CHN); W 4–1 ^{SP}	1st place, gold medalist(s)
Kyotaro Sogabe	Men's −67 kg	Orta (CUB); L 0–8 ^{PO}	Did not advance				
Nao Kusaka	Men's −77 kg	Ouakali (ALG); W 4–0 ^{ST}	Vardanyan (UZB); W 4–1 ^{SP}	Amoyan (ARM); W 3–1 ^{PP}	—N/a	Zhadrayev (KAZ); W 3–1 ^{PP}	1st place, gold medalist(s)

== See also ==
- Japan at the 2024 Summer Paralympics
- Japan at the 2024 Winter Youth Olympics
