= Gullikson =

Gullikson is a surname. Notable people with the surname include:

- Tim Gullikson (1951–1996), American tennis player and coach
- Tom Gullikson (born 1951), American tennis player and coach, twin brother of Tim

== See also ==
- Gullickson
- Ted Gullicksen (1953–2014), American housing rights activist
- Gulliksen
