= Edouard Schmitz =

Swiss equestrian (born 1999)

Personal information
- Born: 12 August 1999 (age 26) Wangen an der Aare, Switzerland

Sport
- Sport: Equestrian

Edouard Schmitz (born 12 August 1999 in Wangen an der Aare, Switzerland) is a Swiss Olympic equestrian.

He competed in the individual jumping event at the 2024 Summer Olympics.
