= Christian Kukuk =

German equestrian

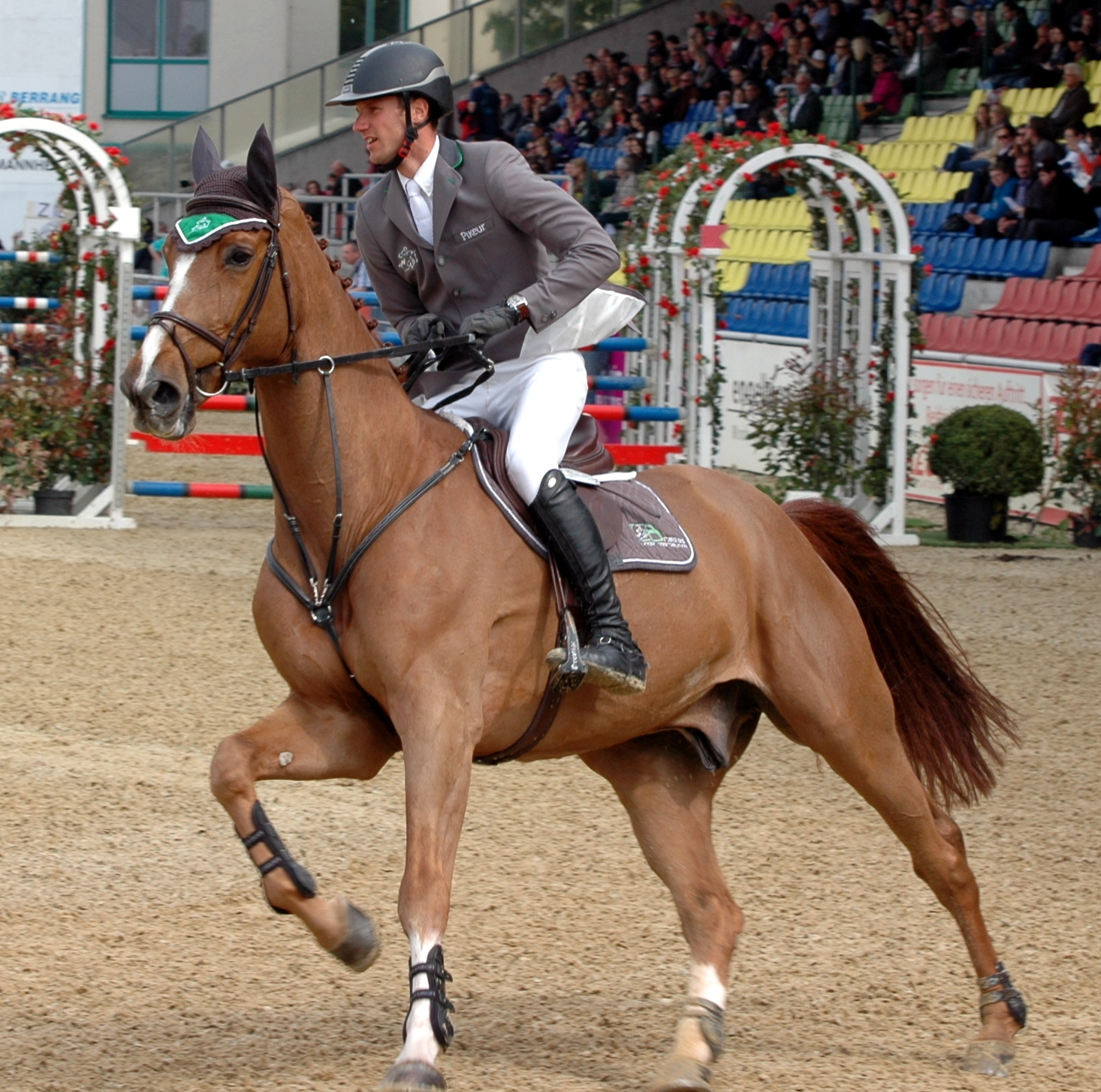
- Kukuk in 2015

Personal information
- Discipline: Show jumping
- Born: 4 March 1990 (age 36); Warendorf, West Germany
- Height: 185 cm (6 ft 1 in)
Medal record
Equestrian
Representing Germany
Olympic Games
Gold medal – first place	2024 Paris	Individual jumping
European Championships
Silver medal – second place	2021 Riesenbeck	Team jumping

Christian Kukuk (born 4 March 1990) is a German equestrian. He competed in the individual jumping event at the 2020 Summer Olympics.

He became Olympic champion at the 2024 Olympic Games in Paris in the individual final with his horse Checker 47.
