= Andrés Azcárraga =

Mexican equestrian (born 1993)

Personal information
- Full name: Andrés Azcárraga Rivera Torres
- Born: 7 April 1993 (age 33); Mexico City, Mexico

Andrés Azcárraga Rivera Torres (born 7 April 1993) is a Mexican Olympic equestrian. He competed in the individual jumping event at the 2024 Summer Olympics.

He is a member of the Azcárraga family.
