= Victoria Gulliksen =

Norwegian equestrian (born 1992)

Personal information
- Nationality: Norwegian
- Born: 23 February 1992 (age 34) Drammen, Norway

Sport
- Country: Norway
- Sport: Equestrian

Achievements and titles
- World finals: 2022 FEI World Championships

Victoria Gulliksen (born 23 February 1992 in Drammen) is a Norwegian show jumping rider. She competed at the 2022 FEI World Championships in Herning and at over ten European Championships in her career, from Juniors up to Senior level. Gulliksen was also part of the 2023 FEI World Cup Finals in Omaha and took part in the World Breeding Championships.

Gulliksen has been nominated by the Norwegian Equestrian Federation to represent Norway as individual at the 2024 Olympic Games in Paris.

== Personal life ==
Gulliksen grew up in an equestrian family in Norway, while her father Geir Gulliksen represented Norway at the 2008 Olympic Games and at the 1994, 2006, 2010 and 2014 World Equestrian Games. She lives both in Norway and Knokke, Belgium with her Belgian boyfriend who is also an international show jumper.
