= Takashi Haase Shibayama =

Japanese equestrian (born 1980)

Personal information
- Nationality: Japanese
- Born: 11 May 1980 (age 45) Kobe, Japan

Sport
- Sport: Equestrian

Takashi Haase Shibayama (born 11 May 1980 in Kobe, Japan) is a Japanese equestrian. He has been selected by the Japanese Equestrian Federation to represent the Japanese show-jumping team at the 2024 Summer Olympics in Paris, which will be his first Olympic appearance.
