= My Relander =

Estonian equestrian (born 1998)

Personal information
- Nationality: Estonian
- Born: 19 August 1998 (age 27) Hyvinkää, Finland

Sport
- Country: Estonia
- Sport: Equestrian
- Event: Show jumping

Achievements and titles
- Olympic finals: 2024 Olympic Games

My Relander (born 19 August 1998 in Hyvinkää, Finland) is an Olympic Estonian show jumping rider. She competed at the 2014 and 2019 European Youth Championships.

In 2024 she competed at the 2024 Summer Olympics in Paris.
