= Ted Gullicksen =

Ted Gullicksen (1953 – October 14, 2014) was an influential social justice activist from San Francisco and the "office manager" (an intentionally modest title) of the progressive tenant rights collective San Francisco Tenants Union from 1988 until his death in October 2014. His collectivism, discipline, and strategic acumen resulted in unparalleled electoral success and influence for the otherwise out-resourced progressive movement.

Born in Quincy, Massachusetts, and raised in nearby Weymouth, he graduated from Weymouth High School in 1971. While a student at Bridgewater State College, Gullicksen helped found and run an alternative newspaper called Hard Times covering social justice issues. After graduation, he helped launch and later became editor of the Taunton Community Journal.

In 1984, he moved to San Francisco, California, and began his career at the Tenant's Union in 1988. Besides political advocacy and direct action, Gullicksen supervised the Tenants Union's tenants rights counseling program, begun in 1970, staffed entirely by volunteers, and serving thousands of renters annually.

In 1992, Gullicksen co-founded Homes Not Jails, which organized a housing takeover at Wherry Housing in the Presidio that ultimately led to affordable housing for veterans.
