= 2024 FEI World Cup Finals (show jumping and dressage) =

Dressage and show jumping event

- Host city: Riyadh, Saudi Arabia
- Date(s): April 16 – 20, 2024
- Main stadium: Riyadh International Convention & Exhibition Center
- Level: Senior
- Type: Indoor
- Events: 2

The 2024 FEI World Cup Finals for dressage and show jumping was held April 16–20, 2024 in Riyadh, Saudi Arabia. The event was held in the Riyadh International Convention & Exhibition Center marking the conclusion of the 2023–24 Dressage and Show jumping World Cup Seasons. It was the first time in history that the World Cup Finals was held on the Asian continent for dressage and for the second time for show-jumping after the finals in Kuala Lumpur, Malaysia 2006. For both disciplines it was the first time in the Middle East region.

The prize money for the competition was reported to be the largest amount ever recorded for an equestrian World Cup final, ultimately awarding €400,000 for Dressage and €2.6 million for the Show Jumping competitions.

The decision to award the event to Saudi Arabia received criticism from some in the European press, accusing the country of "sportswashing" a traditionally European sport. During the event, several equine focused publications declined to cover the flagship event, citing the country's human rights record, position towards LGBT rights, and record for doping in endurance racing.

== Winners ==
=== Dressage Grand Prix ===
Rank	Rider	Horse	GPF score	Notes
1st place, gold medalist(s)	(United Kingdom) Charlotte Fry	Everdale	75.388 %	
2nd place, silver medalist(s)	(Sweden) Patrik Kittel	Touchdown	73.292 %	
3rd place, bronze medalist(s)	(Denmark) Nanna Skodborg Merrald	Blue Hors Don Olymbrio	72.904 %	

=== Dressage Grand Prix Freestyle ===
Rank	Rider	Horse	GPF score	Notes
1st place, gold medalist(s)	(Sweden) Patrik Kittel	Touchdown	81.661 %	
2nd place, silver medalist(s)	(Denmark) Nanna Skodborg Merrald	Blue Hors Don Olymbrio	81.429 %	
3rd place, bronze medalist(s)	(Germany) Isabell Werth	DSP Quantaz	81.404 %	

=== Show jumping Overall ranking ===
Rank	Rider	Nation	Citation
1st place, gold medalist(s)	Henrik von Eckermann	Sweden	
2nd place, silver medalist(s)	Julien Epaillard	France	
3rd place, bronze medalist(s)	Peder Fredricson	Sweden	

== Incidents ==
- Chromatic BF, ridden by Jill Humphrey (USA) collapsed and died after placing third in the jump off.
- Charlotte Fry (UK) and Everdale were eliminated from the World Cup Freestyle when blood was found in the horse's mouth.
- Alisa Glinka (MOL) was suspended after a positive human doping test.
