= Equestrian at the 2024 Summer Olympics – Team jumping =

Team jumping at the Games of the XXXIII Olympiad
- Dates: 1–2 August 2024

Medalists
1st place, gold medalist(s)		Scott Brash; Harry Charles; Ben Maher	Great Britain
2nd place, silver medalist(s)		Karl Cook; Laura Kraut; McLain Ward	United States
3rd place, bronze medalist(s)		Simon Delestre; Julien Epaillard; Olivier Perreau	France

The team show jumping event at the 2024 Summer Olympics took place on 1–2 August 2024. The event was won by the Great Britain team of Scott Brash, Harry Charles and Ben Maher, the third gold medal for Great Britain in the event. Brash and Maher had already been part of the second Great Britain gold medal team in 2012, along with Charles' father, Peter Charles (and Nick Skelton).

The American team won silver and the French bronze.

== Results ==
=== Qualification ===
The best 10 teams (including all tied for 10th place) after the team qualifier progressed to the team final.

Rank	Nation	Riders	Horses	Individual penalties	Team penalties	Notes
1	Germany	Christian Kukuk; Philipp Weishaupt; Richard Vogel	Checker 47; Zineday; United Touch S	0; 0; 0	0	Q
2	United States	Laura Kraut; Karl Cook; McLain Ward	Baloutinue; Caracole de la Roque; Ilex	0; 0; 6	6	Q
3	Great Britain	Ben Maher; Harry Charles; Scott Brash	Dallas Vegas Batilly; Romeo 88; Jefferson	0; 4; 4	8	Q
3	Belgium	Gilles Thomas; Wilm Vermeir; Jérôme Guery	Ermitage Kalone; IQ Van Het Steentje; Quel Homme de Hus	0; 4; 4	8	Q
3	Netherlands	Maikel van der Vleuten; Kim Emmen; Harrie Smolders	Beauville Z; Imagine; Uricas van der Kattevennen	0; 0; 8	8	Q
6	Ireland	Shane Sweetnam; Daniel Coyle; Cian O'Connor	James Kann Cruz; Legacy; Maurice	4; 0; 5	9	Q
7	France	Simon Delestre; Olivier Perreau; Julien Epaillard	I Amelusina R 51; Dorai D'Aiguilly; Dubai du Cedre	8; 4; 0	12	Q
8	Sweden	Henrik von Eckermann; Rolf-Göran Bengtsson; Peder Fredricson	King Edward; Zuccero HV; Catch Me Not S	0; 0; 17	17	Q
9	Israel	Ashlee Bond; Robin Muhr; Daniel Bluman	Donatello 141; Galaxy HM; Ladriano Z	4; 16; 0	20	Q
10	Mexico	Carlos Hank; Federico Hernández; Eugenio Garza	Porthos Maestro WH Z; Romeo; Contago	4; 4; 12	20	Q
11	Spain	Ismael García Roque; Sergio Álvarez Moya; Eduardo Álvarez Aznar	Tirano; Puma HS; Caprice du Vigneul	9; 4; 8	21	
12	Switzerland	Steve Guerdat; Pius Schwizer; Martin Fuchs	Dynamix de Belheme; Vancouver de Lanlore; Leone Jei	8; 12; 4	24	
13	Austria	Katharina Rhomberg; Gerfried Puck; Max Kühner	Colestus Cambridge; Naxcel V; Elektric Blue P	16; 8; 4	28	
14	Canada	Mario Deslauriers; Erynn Ballard; Amy Millar	Emerson; Nikka van der Bisschop; Truman	12; 4; 16	32	
15	Australia	Hilary Scott; Thaisa Erwin; Edwina Tops-Alexander	Milky Way; Utopie Rossignol*IFCE; Fellow Castlefield	16; 16; 4	36	
16	Japan	Taizo Sugitani; Takashi Haase Shibayama; Eiken Sato	Quincy 194; Karamell M&M; Conthargo-Blue	20; 12; 19	51	
17	Poland	Adam Grzegorzewski; Dawid Kubiak; Maksymilian Wechta	Issem; Flash Blue B; Chepettano	28; 16; 9	53	
18	United Arab Emirates	Omar Abdul Aziz Al-Marzooqi; Ali Hamad Al-Kirbi; Abdullah Mohd Al-Marri	Enjoy de la Mure; Jarlin de Torres; McGregor	12; 44; 16	72	
19	Saudi Arabia	Abdulrahman Alrajhi; Khaled Almobty; Ramzy Al-Duhami	Ventago; Jaguar King WD; Untouchable 32	8; 20; WD	28+WD	
	Brazil	Pedro Veniss; Stephan de Freitas Barcha; Rodrigo Pessoa	Nimrod de Muze; Primavera; Major Tom	EL; 4; WD	Eliminated	

=== Final ===
Rank	Nation	Riders	Horses	Individual penalties	Team penalties	Notes
1st place, gold medalist(s)	Great Britain	Ben Maher; Harry Charles; Scott Brash	Dallas Vegas Batilly; Romeo 88; Jefferson	1; 0; 1	2	
2nd place, silver medalist(s)	United States	Laura Kraut; Karl Cook; McLain Ward	Baloutinue; Caracole de la Roque; Ilex	4; 0; 0	4	
3rd place, bronze medalist(s)	France	Simon Delestre; Olivier Perreau; Julien Epaillard	I Amelusina R 51; Dorai D'Aiguilly; Dubai du Cedre	3; 0; 4	7	
4	Netherlands	Maikel van der Vleuten; Kim Emmen; Harrie Smolders	Beauville Z; Imagine; Uricas van der Kattevennen	6; 0; 1	7	
5	Germany	Christian Kukuk; Richard Vogel; Philipp Weishaupt	Checker 47; United Touch S; Zineday	4; 4; 0	8	
6	Sweden	Henrik von Eckermann; Rolf-Göran Bengtsson; Peder Fredricson	King Edward; Zuccero HV; Catch Me Not S	4; 4; 4	12	
7	Ireland	Shane Sweetnam; Daniel Coyle; Cian O'Connor	James Kann Cruz; Legacy; Maurice	5; 0; 9	14	
8	Belgium	Gilles Thomas; Wilm Vermeir; Jérôme Guery	Ermitage Kalone; IQ Van Het Steentje; Quel Homme de Hus	8; 4; 8	20	
9	Israel	Robin Muhr; Ashlee Bond; Daniel Bluman	Galaxy HM; Donatello 141; Ladriano Z	13; 20; WD	33+WD	
	Mexico	Carlos Hank; Federico Hernández; Eugenio Garza	Porthos Maestro WH Z; Romeo; Contago	WD; WD; WD	Withdrawn	

*WD = Withdrawn *RT = Retired *EL = Eliminated
