= Wilm Vermeir =

Belgian equestrian (born 1979)

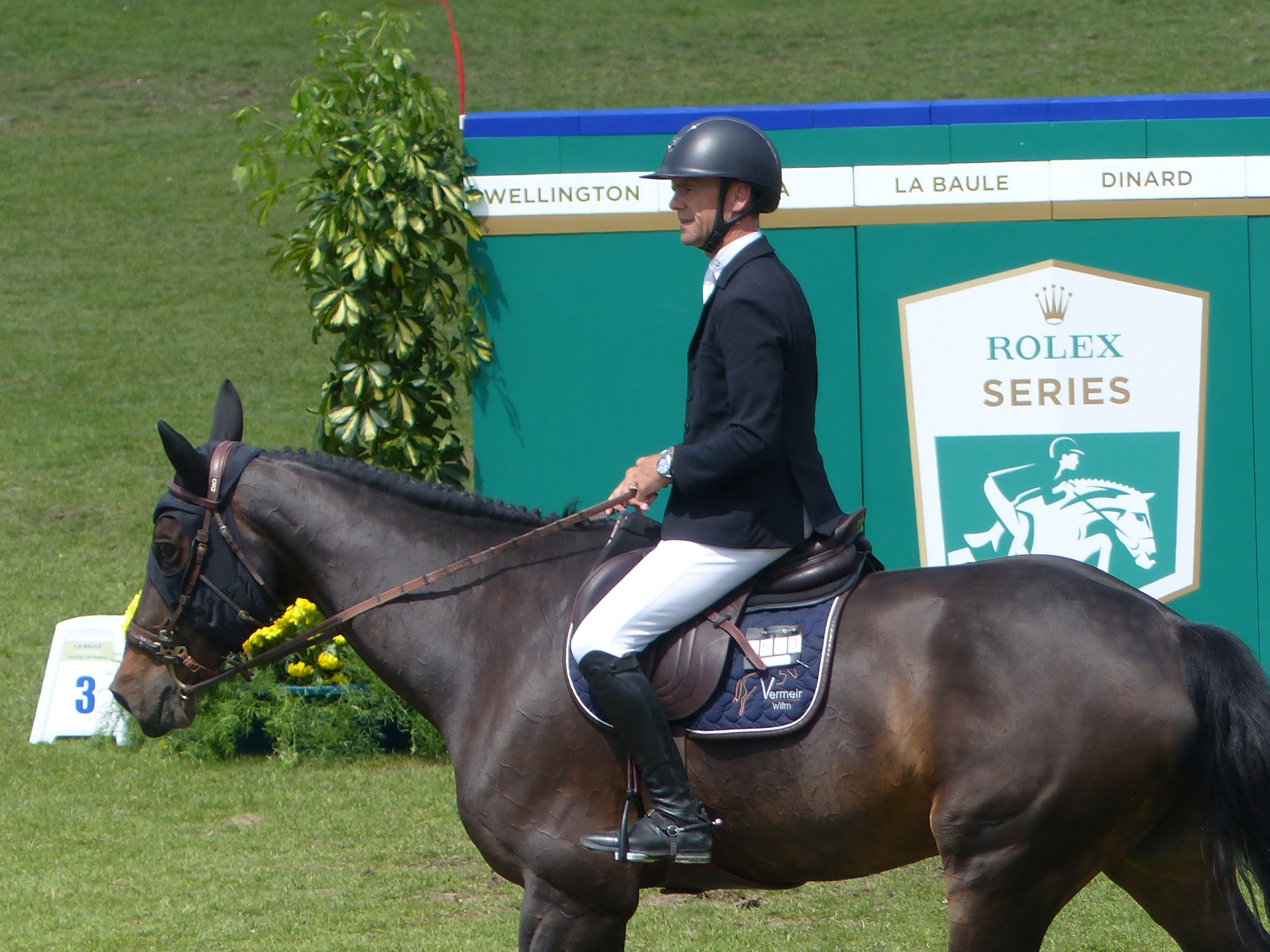
- Vermier astride Iq Van Het Steentje in 2024

Personal information
- Nationality: Belgian
- Born: 8 July 1979 (age 46) Dendermonde, Belgium

Wilm Vermeir (born 8 July 1979 in Dendermonde, Belgium) is a Belgian show jumping rider.

He competed at the 2024 Summer Olympics in Paris, France, where he finished 8th in the team competition with the horse IQ van het Steentje. He was replaced by Grégory Wathelet for the individual competition because his horse did not pass the horse inspection prior the individual final.
