= Daniel Bluman =

Israeli equestrian (born 1990)

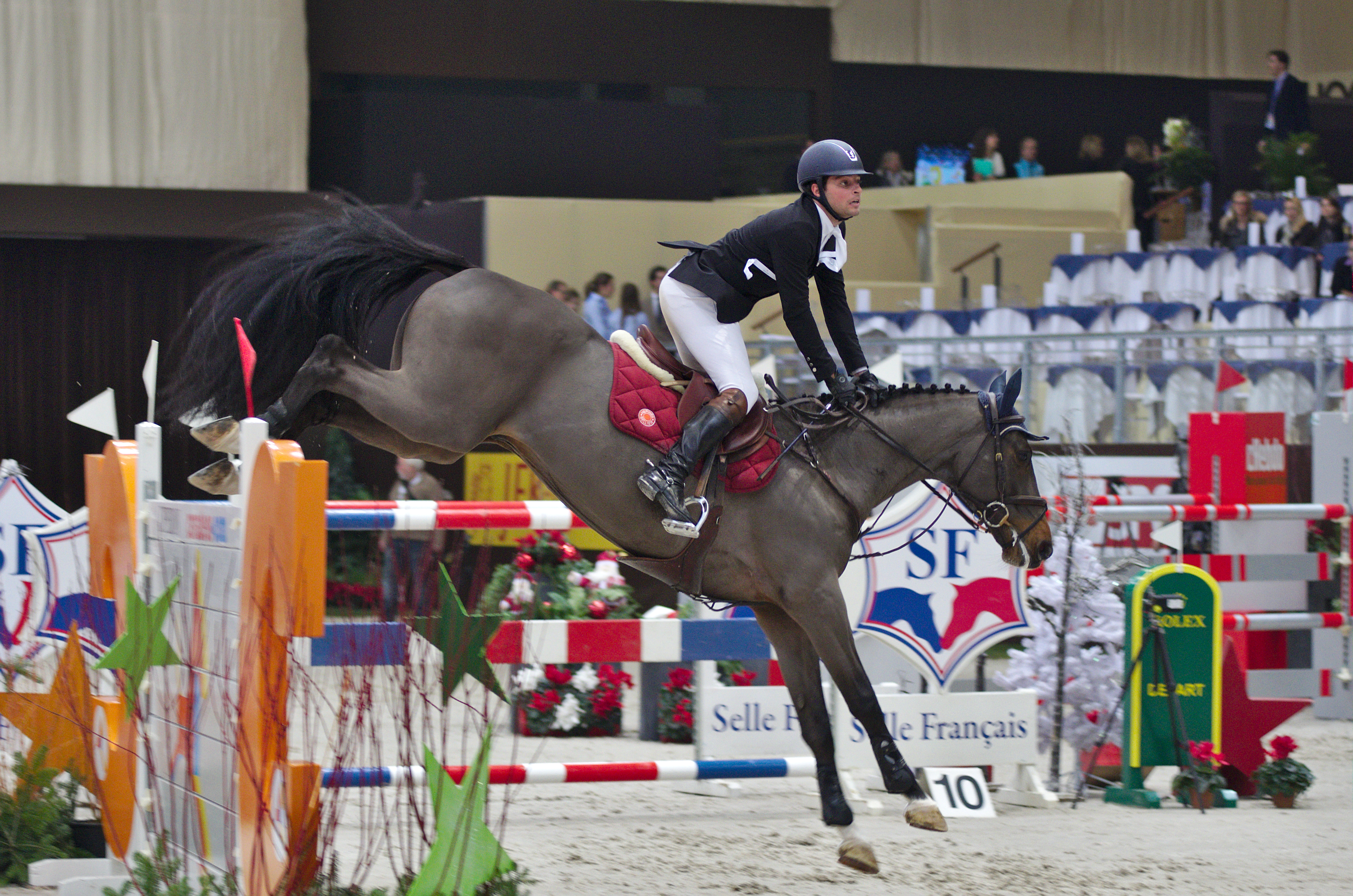
- Bluman riding Cantando in 2013

Personal information
- Native name: דניאל בלומן
- National team: Colombia (until mid 2016); Israel (since late 2016)
- Citizenship: Colombian, Israeli
- Born: Daniel Bluman Doron (Note: In this Spanish name, the first or paternal surname is Bluman and the second or maternal family name is Doron.); 15 March 1990 (age 36) Medellín, Colombia
- Education: Florida Atlantic University
- Height: 182 cm (6 ft 0 in)
- Weight: 72 kg (159 lb)
- Spouse: Ariel Epstein
- Children: 2 sons

Sport
- Country: Colombia (until mid 2016); Israel (since late 2016)
- Sport: Equestrian
- Rank: World No. 11 (2021)
Medal record
Equestrian
Representing Colombia
Central American and Caribbean Games
Gold medal – first place	2014 Veracruz	Team jumping
Bronze medal – third place	2014 Veracruz	Individual speed

Daniel Bluman (Hebrew: דניאל בלומן; born 15 March 1990) is an Olympic show jumping rider. Born in Colombia, he represents Israel internationally and competed for his country of birth in the past. Bluman qualified to represent Israel at the 2020 Summer Olympics in Tokyo, but did not compete due to a clerical error in his horse's registration. Bluman represented Israel at the 2024 Paris Olympics at the Palace of Versailles in individual jumping and team jumping (in which Israel came in 9th).

== Early life ==
Bluman was born in Medellín, Colombia, and is Jewish.

His father Samuel is an entrepreneur, and his mother Orly is a psychologist and social worker. His brother Steven also rides for Israel. His Polish-born Jewish grandfather on his father's side, a Holocaust survivor whose entire family was murdered, was in the Auschwitz concentration camp for three years and emigrated to Colombia after he was liberated. Bluman said: "My grandfather is a survivor of the Holocaust. We know what happened to him and his family. And we also know that the only reason this could never happen again is because we have the State of Israel. It’s that simple." His father's family is from Poland and Holland. His grandfather on his mother's side is Israeli, and his mother's family is from Israel and Hungary.

Bluman attended Hebrew school growing up. As a young child he had panic attacks, which he overcame in time. When he was ten years old, he moved with his family to Weston in South Florida in the United States.

He is an alumnus of Cypress Bay High School in Weston. Bluman later earned an associate degree in business from Florida Atlantic University, attending on a full scholarship.

== Riding career ==
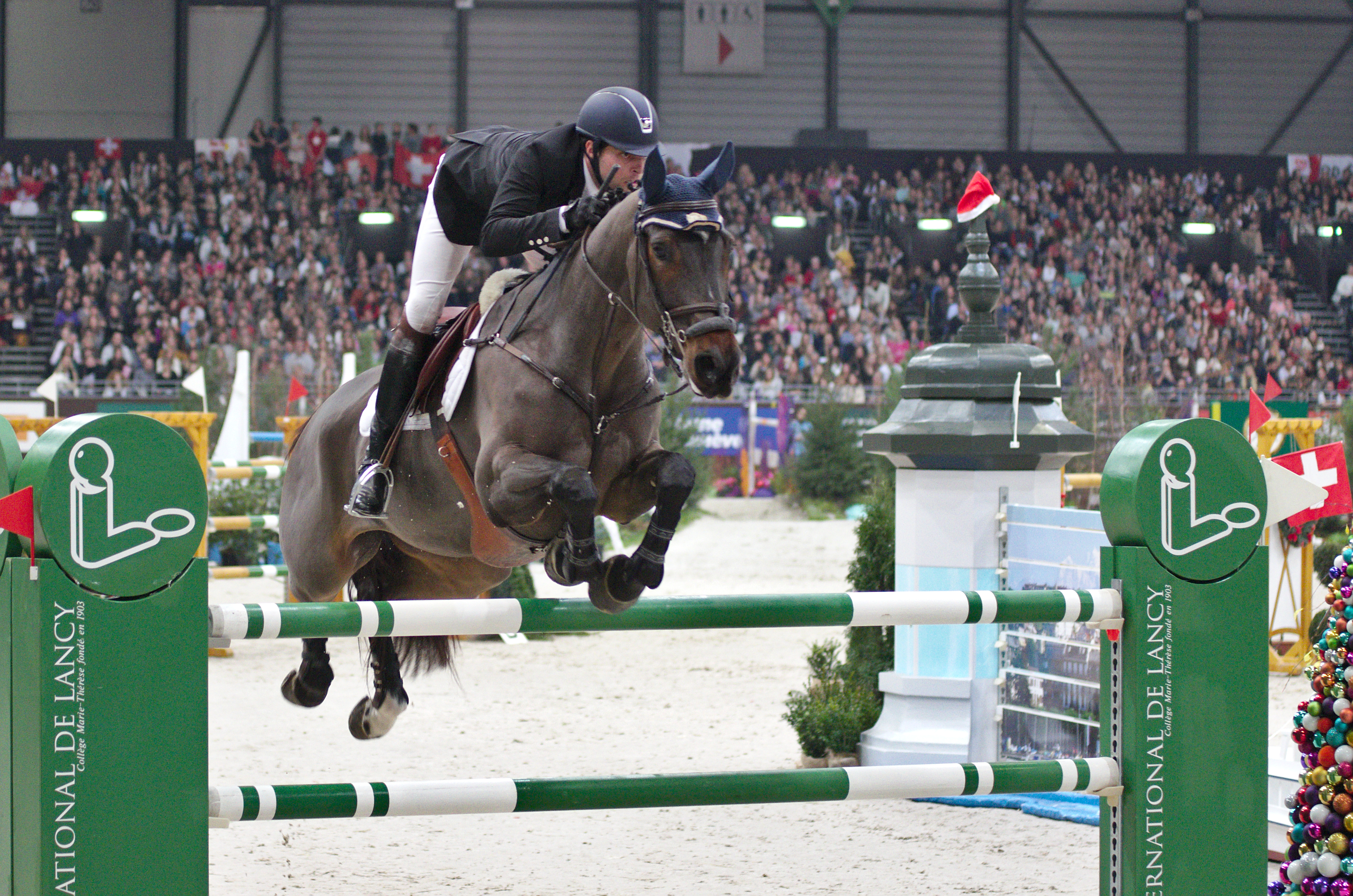
Bluman riding Sancha LS

Bluman started riding horses at age three. In 2004, he won the Gold Medal FEI Children World Championship at 16 years of age. In 2007, Bluman moved to Wellington, Florida, where he started his professional riding career. Bluman relocated to Belgium in 2013, where he trained with Nelson Pessoa for two years.

=== Representing Colombia; 2012 London Olympics and 2016 Rio Olympics ===
Bluman competed at three World Equestrian Games: the 2010 World Equestrian Games in Lexington, and the 2014 World Equestrian Games in Caen. He also participated at regional games, including the 2011 Pan American Games in Guadalajara (at which he finished 7th) and the 2015 Pan American Games. He was a 2014 team gold medalist at the Central American and Caribbean Games in Veracruz, a bronze medalist at the 2016 LGCT Grand Prix of Hamburg, and a bronze medalist at the 2016 LGCT Grand Prix of Chantilly.

Representing Colombia, Bluman competed individually at two Summer Olympics: the 2012 Summer Olympics in London, and the 2016 Summer Olympics in Rio de Janeiro riding Apardi. His best Olympic result came in 2012 when he placed 20th individually.

=== Representing Israel ===
==== 2016–20 ====
Bluman has been riding on behalf of Israel since late 2016, having been an Israeli citizen since long before then. He said

Through it all, the one thing that has always remained with me is ... what it means to be Jewish and to come from a family who has had to go through the Holocaust.... Israel is a country that accepts every person — it doesn't matter your sexual orientation, your race, your religion, your ideas.... I'm very proud and emotional when I think about representing the Israeli flag.

Bluman won the Grand Prix at the Hampton Classic Horse Show in 2017 on Ladriano Z, a Zangersheide gelding.

In November 2018, Bluman won the $85,000 GroupBy “Big Ben” Challenge at the CSI4*-W Royal Horse Show in Toronto, Canada, riding Ladriano Z. He was named the 2018 Rider of the Year by L'Annee Hippique. In May 2019, Bluman won the Rolex Grand Prix at CSIO Rome di Siena.

In July 2019, Bluman, Ashlee Bond, Danielle G. Waldman, and Elad Yaniv won the Olympic Jumping Qualifier at Maxima Park in Moscow, Russia, qualifying for the Tokyo Olympics, the first time that Israel had earned a place in the Olympics in equestrian. However, due to a technicality regarding the registration of his horse Gemma W, Bluman was deemed ineligible to compete just weeks prior to the start of the competition.

He did not ride competitively in 2020, during the Covid pandemic.

==== 2021–22; World #11 and Tokyo Olympics registration snafu ====
In June 2021, Bluman won the $213,300 Turtle Creek Casino & Hotel Grand Prix CSI4* in Traverse City, Michigan, riding Cachemire de Braize.

Bluman was about to compete for Team Israel at the Tokyo Olympics in August 2021 in individual jumping and team jumping, but a technical mistake in his horse's documentation prevented him from traveling to Japan to compete. While he qualified to compete, he was told that he could not compete because his horse Gemma was mistakenly listed as American, rather than Israeli. This was even though Bluman, her sole owner, had never been American, and the horse had no sporting links to the US. He requested assistance from the International Federation for Equestrian Sports (FEI) to correct the error, but his request was denied.

In August 2021, Bluman won the $217,000 Cabana Coast Grand Prix CSI 5* in Toronto, Canada, riding Ubiluc. In September 2021 he won the $300,000 45th Hampton Classic Grand Prix in Bridgehampton, N.Y., riding Gemma W. In October 2021 he won the ArenaMend Classic in the CSI5* $175,000 1.50 Qualifier, riding Gemma W, in White Sulphur Springs, West Virginia.

Bluman's highest world ranking was #11 in 2021. In November 2022 he won the $215,900 CSI4* World Cup of Lexington riding Ladriano Z.

==== 2023; third Hampton Classic victory ====
In March 2023, Bluman won the $425,000 CSI5* Wellington Equestrian Realty CSI5* Grand Prix in Wellington, Florida, riding Ladriano Z. Bluman won the 2023 $226,000 Kentucky Invitational CSI 3* Grand Prix championship in April, riding Gemma W. In May 2023, he won the $38,700 FEI 1.45m Two-Phase riding Cachemire De Braize. In June 2023 he won the $215,900 FEI Jumping World Cup Lexington riding Ladriano Z.

In July 2023 Bluman and his Israeli teammates won the Group C Designated Olympic Qualifier at the CSIO4* CET Prague Cup. The win qualified Team Israel for the 2024 Paris Olympics.

In September 2023, Bluman won the $425,000 Longines Hampton Classic 5* Grand Prix with Ladriano Z, winning $140,250 in prize money. It was Bluman's third Hampton Classic Grand Prix win. He is one of only four riders to win the Hampton Classic Grand Prix three times. Later that year, Bluman won the $300,000 FEI Saugerties 4* Grand Prix. He then went on to win the $76,000 Major League Show Jumping CND Grand Prix 1.45 m, American Gold Cup with Cachemire de Braize in Traverse City, Michigan.

In November 2023, he and Gemma W won the $250,000 Longines FEI Jumping World Cup in Toronto, Canada. With the victory, Bluman moved to the top of the North American League standings. Since 2018, Bluman and Gemma had won over one million euro in prize money and had 28 podium finishes.

In 2023, Bluman also won, with Ladriano Z the $425,000 CSI5* Wellington Equestrian Realty Grand Prix, Winter Equestrian Festival 9; and the Nations Cup to help Israel qualify for the Paris 2024 Olympics; with With GEMMA W the $75,900 CND MLSJ IND Competition, American Gold Cup; the $300,000 FEI CSI4* Grand Prix, HITS on the Hudson VIII; and the $146,000 CSI 5* Adequate WEF Challenge Round 12, Winter Equestrian Festival 12; with Cachemire de Braize the $30,000 Grand Prix of Princeton, Princeton Summer Welcome; the $38,700 1.45 m, Old Salem Farm May II; the $77,300 FEI 1.45 m Grand Prix, TerraNova Hunter Jumper 1; and the $38,700 1.45 m Welcome, Split Rock Sarasota; and with Lady Applaus the $200 7 Year old Jumper, HITS on the Hudson VIII.

Bluman had a career-high 14 wins in 2023.

==== 2024–present; 2024 Paris Olympics ====
In February 2024, Bluman won the $32,000 FEI 1.45m Welcome Speed in Florida riding Gemma W. In March 2024 he won the $32,000 Galati Yacht Sales FEI 1.45m Welcome Speed at TerraNova Winter Series Week III riding Cachemire de Braize.

His world ranking in July 2024 was #13.

Bluman represented Israel at the 2024 Paris Olympics at the Palace of Versailles, riding Ladriano Z. He said: "I love Israel and what it stands for. It is a great honor for me to carry the Israeli flag wherever possible and to display it proudly and with commitment.”

In team jumping, he completed a perfect round with zero points during the team qualifier, leading the team to the finals, where it came in 9th. In individual jumping, he had to end his competition early after Ladriano refused to jump over one of the obstacles.

== Personal life ==
In 2016, Bluman married Ariel Epstein, an amateur rider who also represents Israel in competition. The two have two sons, Avi and Eli. In addition to riding, Bluman runs Bluman Equestrian, alongside his cousins and brother in North Salem, New York, and Wellington, Florida.

=== Equine therapy project; Hamas attack ===
Bluman has an equine therapy project in Israel that he operates in conjunction with Kibbutz Urim.

In the October 7 Hamas attack on Israel in 2023, the project in Israel was attacked. Bluman said:

This touches very close to home... I am both pro-Israel and pro-Palestine, because I am pro-life, pro-human rights, and unfortunately right now the only way to get to that is by eradicating Hamas and terrorists groups that are fighting religious wars.

Erez Kalderon from Kibbutz Nir Oz, a student in the equine therapy program, was kidnapped by Hamas when the boy was 11 years old, and is held hostage. In December 2023, for the first time since the attack on the program, the program was able to work with children.
