= Olivier Perreau =

French equestrian

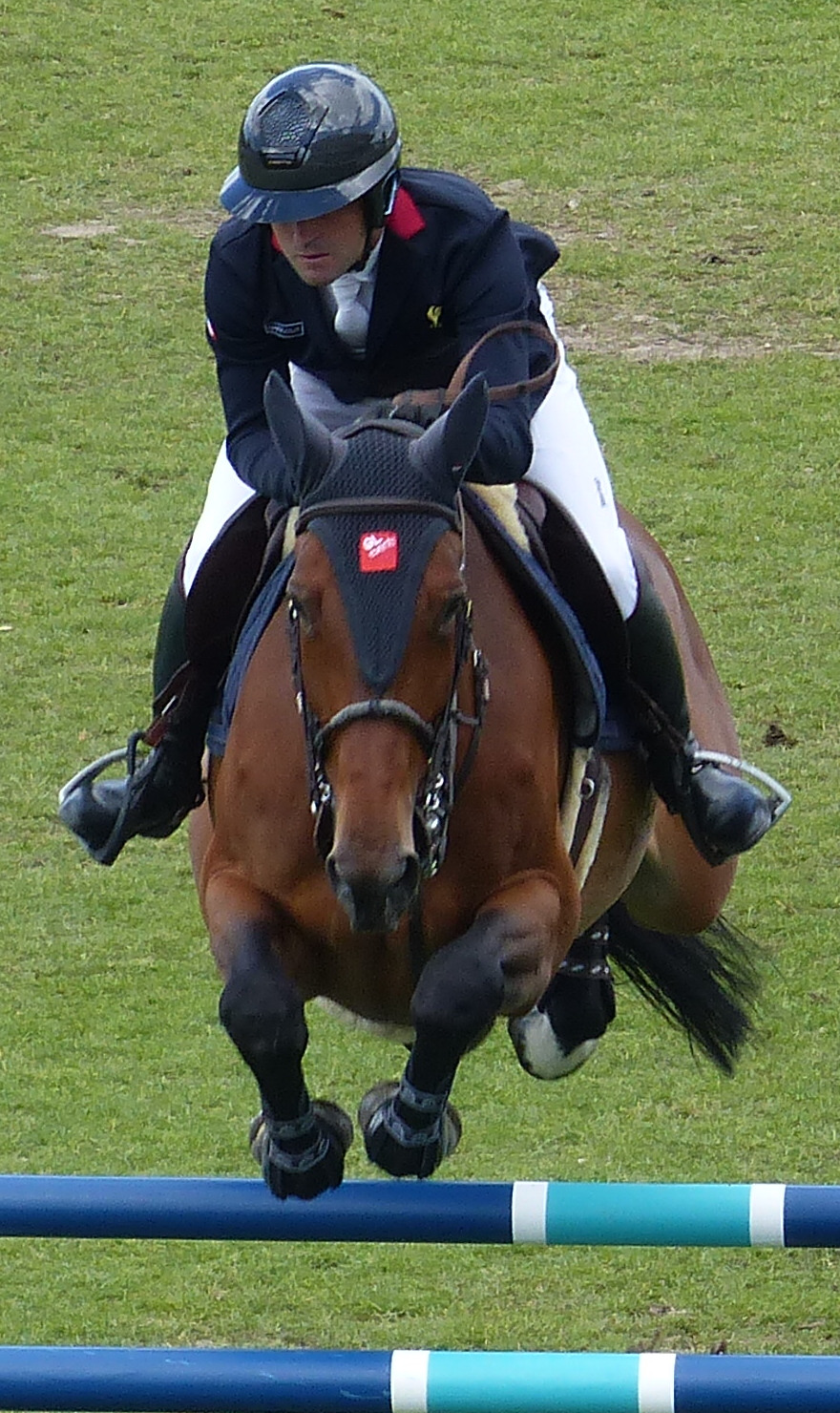
- Perreau in 2024

Personal information
- Full name: Olivier Claude Dominique Perreau
- Born: 23 June 1986 (age 40) Saulieu, France

Sport
- Country: France
- Sport: Equestrian
- Event: Show jumping
Medal record
Equestrian
Representing France
Olympic Games
| Bronze medal – third place | 2024 Paris | Team jumping |

Olivier Claude Dominique Perreau (born 23 June 1986) is a French equestrian. He competed at the 2024 Summer Olympics.
