= Ashlee Bond =

Israeli show jumping rider (born 1985)

Ashlee Bond אשלי בונד
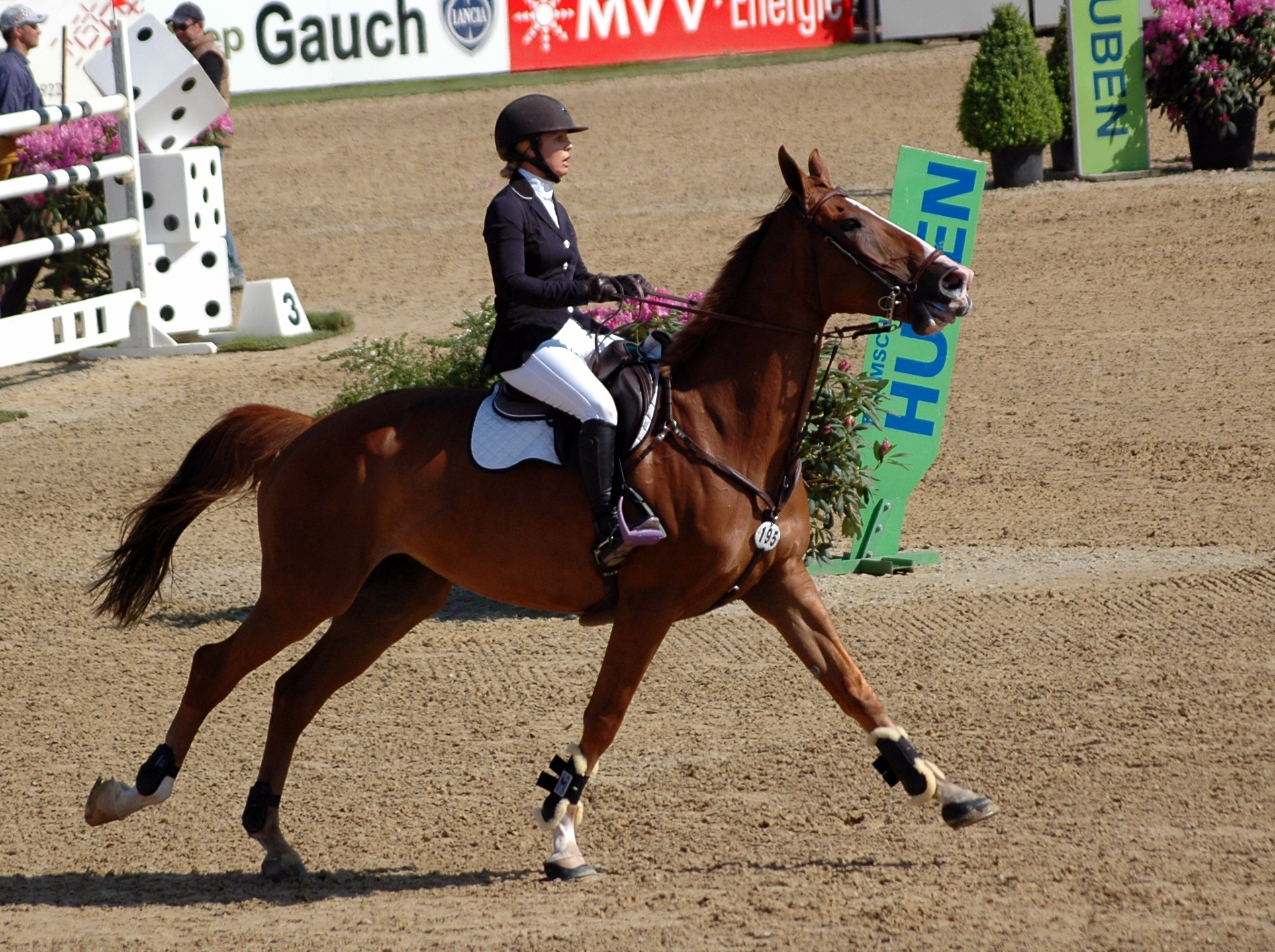
- Ashlee Bond riding Chela LS in 2014

Personal information
- Nationality: American-Israeli
- Discipline: Show jumping
- Born: 15 April 1985 (age 41); United States
- Horse: Donatello 141

Ashlee Bond (Hebrew: אשלי בונד; often spelled Ashley Bond, born 15 April 1985) is an Israeli Olympic show jumping rider who competes for Israel. Born in the United States, she is an Israeli citizen. She represented Israel at the 2020 Summer Olympics in Tokyo, coming in 11th. Bond represented Israel at the 2024 Paris Olympics in team jumping at the Palace of Versailles, and with Team Israel came in 9th.

== Early life ==
Bond's father is Israeli soap opera star and lifelong equestrian Steve Bond (né Shlomo Goldberg). He was born and raised in Haifa, Israel (his entire side of the family is from Israel), and moved to the United States when he was 12 years old. He is also his daughter's business partner, has a riding background that includes cutting horses, polo ponies, and show jumping in his 40s, and trains the horses that she rides in competitions.

Her mother, Cindy, is a filmmaker. Bond has one sibling, her younger brother Dylan. She attended Calabasas High School.

== Riding career ==
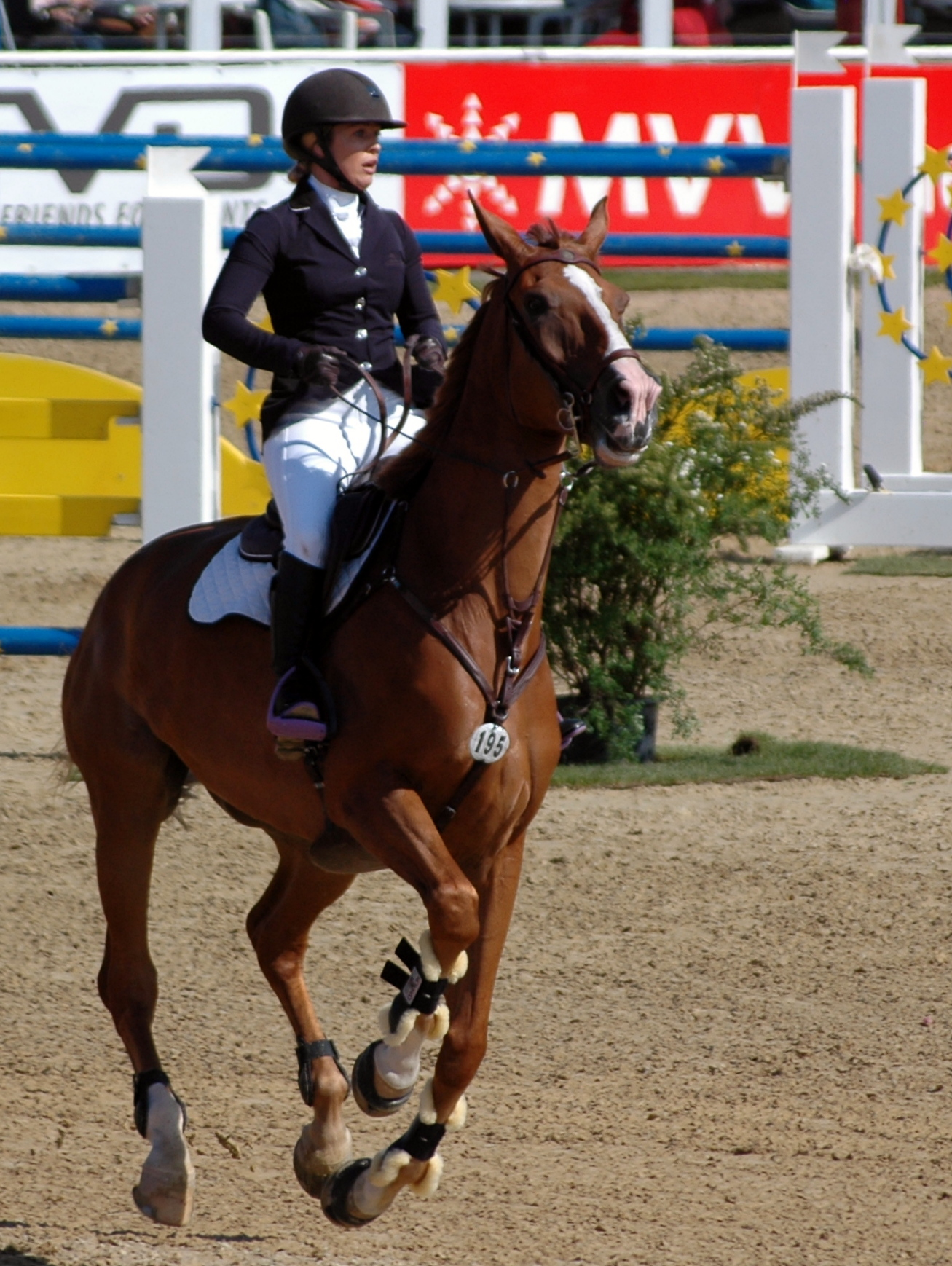
Bond riding Chela LS in 2014

Bond's father first put her on a horse when she was six months old. She began competing in jumping at the age of six. She had ridden 39 horses in her career as of July 2024.

Bond won her first grand prix at age 16. In 2001, she was named Grand Prix Rookie Rider of the Year by both the United States Equestrian Federation (USEF) and the Pacific Coast Horse Association.

At 19 years of age, Bond stepped away from jumping for two years. She then came back to it when she was 21 years old. In 2009, at 24, she was in the top 40 in the International Federation for Equestrian Sports (FEI) World Rankings, was No. 2 on the Rolex/USEF Show Jumping Rankings, and was named "Chronicle of the Horse" Show Jumping Horseman of the Year.

Between 2009 and 2014, Bond won the 2009 CHIO Aachen, 2014 HITS $1 Million Grand Prix, and an FEI Nations Cup. She won the 2016 $100,000 Longines FEI World Cup Jumping title at Thermal, California, and the 2017 $100,000 Longines FEI World Cup Qualifier at the HITS Coachella Desert Circuit.

=== 2016–19 ===
In February 2019, Bond riding Donatello (“Donnie”) won the $10,000 CSIO5* CP Welcome Stake at the Palm Beach Masters in Wellington, Florida. That month she and Ereina also won the $72,000 CSIO5* NetJets Classic at the Palm Beach Masters.

In April 2019, Bond won the $20,000 Osphos 1.40-1.45m Speed Classic with 8-year-old Westphalian gelding Donatello 141 (Diarado—Luna) in Temecula, California. In July 2019 she retired her top horse, the chestnut mare Chela LS at 15.

In October 2019, Bond riding Donatello won the $100,000 Longines FEI Jumping World Cup Del Mar in California in a field of 37 starters, after a five-way jump off.

=== 2020–22; Tokyo Olympics ===
In March 2020, Bond riding Donatello won the $401,000 Douglas Elliman Real Estate CSI5* at the Winter Equestrian Festival (WEF) in a field of 40 riders in Wellington, Florida.

She represented Israel at the 2020 Summer Olympics in Tokyo, Japan, in 2021, riding Donatello 141. In July 2019 Team Israel's Bond, Daniel Bluman, Danielle Goldstein, and Elad Yaniv won the Olympic Jumping Qualifier at Maxima Park in Moscow, qualifying for the Tokyo Olympics, the first time that Israel has earned a place in the Olympics in equestrian. She competed in the Tokyo Olympics as part of Israel's first-ever equestrian delegation at the Olympic Games. She finished 11th overall in the jumping final, after coming in 3rd overall in the qualifying round, out of 73 competing riders. The Israeli team was eliminated from the team during the qualification round after another member fell from his horse.

In April 2022, Bond won the $500,000 Rolex Grand Prix CSI5* at the 2022 Winter Equestrian Festival riding black mare Karoline of Ballmore, winning a monetary prize of $165,00.

In September 2022 she and Donatello 141 won the $138,600 Saugerties Jumper Classic CSI5* at the HITS Championship.

=== 2023; Victory in the Wellington International CSI5* ===
In February 2023, Bond and Donatello 141 won the Wellington International in Florida in the Winter Equestrian Festival CSI5* Challenge Cup 1.55m, over 50 starters. In April 2023, she and Donatello 141 won the Wellington $146,000 Palm Beach County Sports Commission CSI3* Grand Prix. In June 2023 she and Donatello won the $226,000 Sapphire Grand Prix of Devon in Devon, Pennsylvania.

In July 2023, she and Donatello were the only partnership among almost 40 starters to achieve a double clear in the Olympic qualifiers in Prague in the Czech Republic, as the Israeli team finished in first place and qualified for the Paris Olympics.

In 2023, Bond and Donatello 141 came in second at the American Gold Cup CSI5*. In October 2023 she was ranked the 44th rider in the world.

=== 2024–present; Paris Olympics ===
In February 2024, Bond won the 1.40m CSI5* opening class while riding the 10-year-old mare Elka de la Pomme (Cartoon Z). In May 2024, she won the $25,000 Spring IV Grand Prix riding Donatello.

Bond represented Israel at the 2024 Paris Olympics in team jumping at the Palace of Versailles. She said: "For me, the most important [thing] is for the team to do well, and then my individual result later is a bonus." She added:

I feel like now is the time to really stand up for what you believe in, and not let people silence you or scare you into not doing what you believe is the right thing. We’re just going to ... keep our heads up and be proud to represent Israel, and show ... that we will not back down and cower and not compete because we’re scared.

Her mother organized a large prayer chain of people who committed to pray for Team Israel before and throughout the Olympic Games. Bond and her Team Israel teammates came in 9th in the team event.

== Personal life ==
Her nickname is Bondie. She grew up in San Diego. Bond married Roy Meeus, a Belgian former professional football player who retired three years later, in 2015 and they have a daughter named Scottie, born in 2016. Some of her family lives in Israel. She has lived in Hidden Hills, San Diego, and Los Angeles, California, and now lives in Wellington, Florida. She had a role in the 2001 comedy-romance film Extreme Days, and did voice work in the 2007 animated film The Ten Commandments.

Bond has Hashimoto's thyroiditis, an autoimmune disease of the thyroid, and follows a diet of intermittent fasting. She is Christian, while her father is Jewish, and she said "I am part Jewish." She became an Israeli citizen in 2018, and now rides and competes for Israel.
