= Julien Epaillard =

French show jumping rider

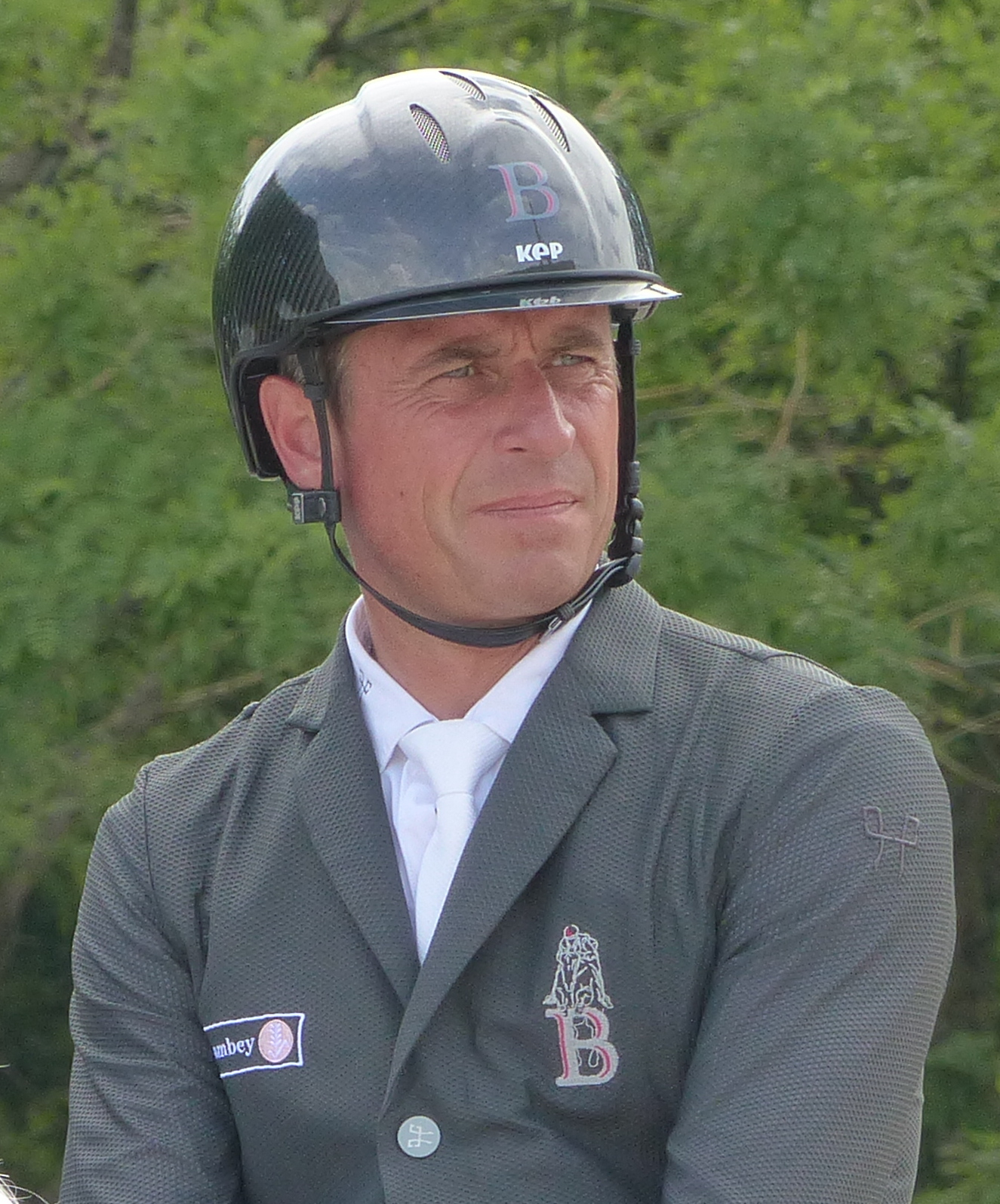
- Epaillard in 2023

Personal information
- Full name: Julien Jean-Christophe Didier Epaillard
- Born: 24 July 1977 (age 48) Cherbourg, France

Sport
- Country: France
- Sport: Equestrian
- Event: Show jumping
Medal record
Olympic Games
Bronze medal – third place	2024 Paris	Team jumping
Nations Cup Final
Silver medal – second place	2023 Barcelona	Team jumping
Silver medal – second place	2022 Barcelona	Team jumping
European Championships
Gold medal – first place	1996 Klagenfurt	Individual jumping
Silver medal – second place	2023 San Remo	Individual jumping
Silver medal – second place	1996 Klagenfurt	Team jumping
Bronze medal – third place	1998 Lisbon	Team jumping
World Cup
Silver medal – second place	2024 Riyadh	Individual jumping

Julien Jean-Christophe Didier Epaillard (born 24 July 1977) is a French international show jumping rider.

== Career ==
Epaillard has won multiple medals at the Championship level, including an individual bronze medal at the 2023 European Championships and a gold, silver and bronze medal at the 1996 and 1998 European Championships for Young Riders. He also took part at the 2022 FEI World Championships and at two FEI Nations Cup Finals and two World Cup Finals. He competed over many international competitions, World Cup qualifiers and 5* shows. In 2023, he mentioned to focus on the qualification for the 2024 Olympics in his home country France.

== Personal life ==
Epaillard started riding at a young age at his parents farm in the place where he was born. Now, Epaillard has competed many horses on the highest level and competed in over 4,000 competitions.
