= Kim Emmen =

Dutch show jumping rider

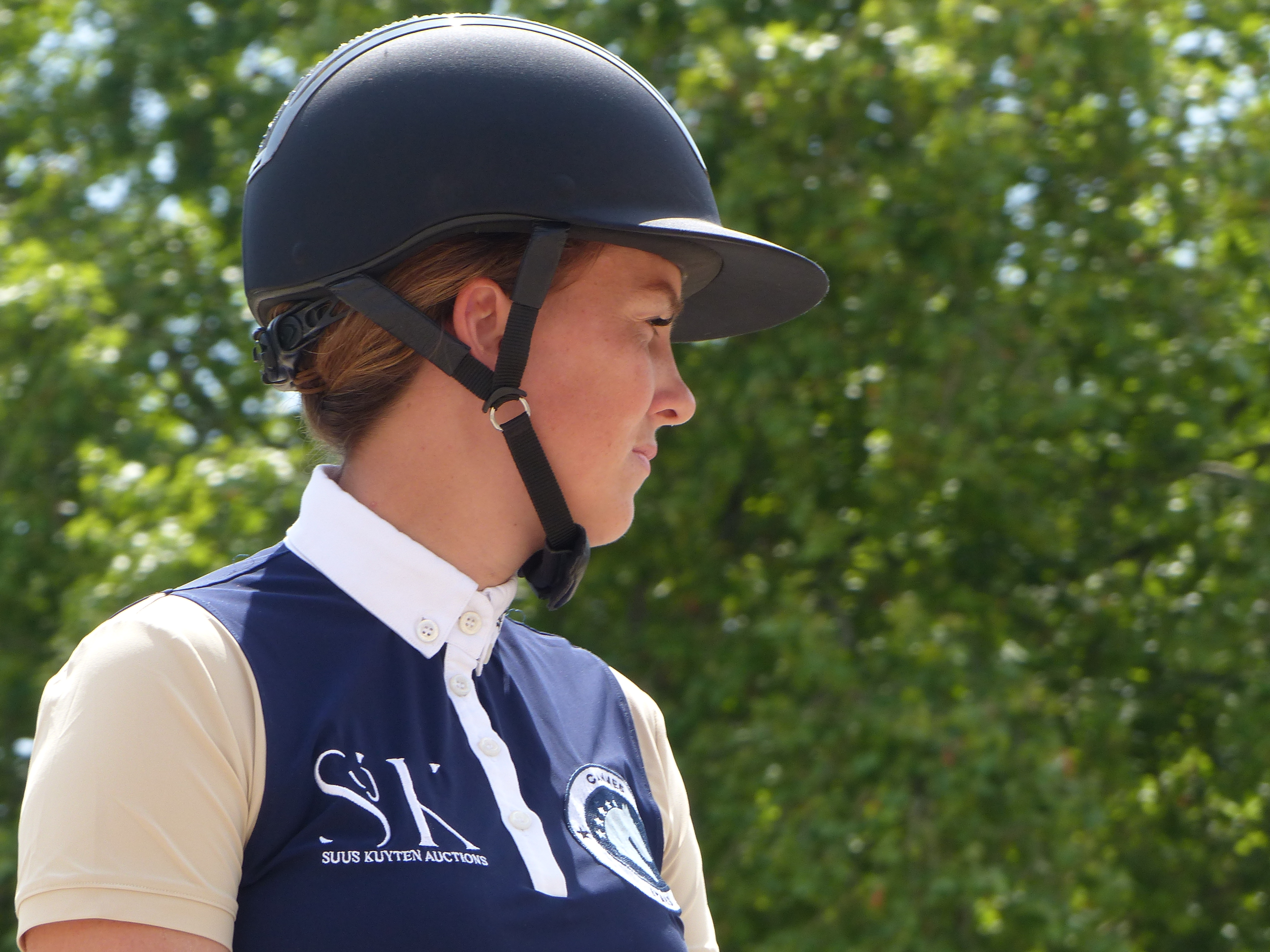
- Emmen in 2023

Personal information
- Nationality: Netherlands
- Discipline: Jumping
- Born: 21 March 1995 (age 30); Oosterhout, Netherlands

Kim Emmen (born 21 March 1995 in Oosterhout, Netherlands) is a Dutch Olympic show jumping rider.

She competed at the 2024 Summer Olympics in Paris, France, where she placed 4th in the team and 23rd in the individual competition. She was also part of the Dutch team at the 2023 Show-Jumping European Championships in Milan, Italy.

She won with the national team the team event at the 2025 CHIO Rotterdam.
