= Israel at the 2024 Summer Olympics =

- IOC code: ISR
- NOC: Olympic Committee of Israel
- Website: www.olympicsil.co.il (in Hebrew and English)

in Paris, France 26 July 2024 – 11 August 2024
- Competitors: 88 (54 men and 34 women) in 16 sports and 67 events
- Flag bearers (opening): Peter Paltchik & Andrea Murez
- Flag bearers (closing): Tom Reuveny & Romi Paritzki
- Medals Ranked 41st: Gold 1 Silver 5 Bronze 1 Total 7

Summer Olympics appearances (overview)
- 1952; 1956; 1960; 1964; 1968; 1972; 1976; 1980; 1984; 1988; 1992; 1996; 2000; 2004; 2008; 2012; 2016; 2020; 2024

Israel competed at the 2024 Summer Olympics in Paris from 26 July to 11 August 2024. This was the nation's 18th appearance at the Summer Olympics. Since Israel's debut in 1952, Israeli athletes have appeared in every edition of the Summer Olympic Games, other than the 1980 Summer Olympics in Moscow, which it opted not to attend in accordance with the US-led boycott. It was Israel's most successful Olympic Games by number of medals.

The participation of Israel in 2024 prompted calls from twenty-six French lawmakers, Palestinian, and other global sports organizations for sanctions against Israel and to prevent its participation due to the impact of the Gaza war on Palestinian athletes and sports facilities, but IOC President Thomas Bach confirmed this was never an issue for the IOC and cautioned athletes against boycotts and discrimination. Bach also said, “Since the heinous attack on the Israeli team, there were always special measures being taken with Israeli athletes.” The president of the Olympic Committee of Israel, Yael Arad, assured that Israeli athletes would "100 per cent" be present, with safety measures in place.

The judoka Peter Paltchik and swimmer Andrea Murez were chosen as the nation's flag bearers at the opening ceremony. Israel finished the games with seven medals, including one gold.

== Medalists ==
Medal	Name	Sport	Event	Date
Gold	Tom Reuveny	Sailing	Men's iQFoil	3 August
Silver	Inbar Lanir	Judo	Women's −78 kg	1 August
Silver	Raz Hershko	Judo	Women's +78 kg	2 August
Silver	Sharon Kantor	Sailing	Women's iQFoil	3 August
Silver	Artem Dolgopyat	Gymnastics	Men's floor	3 August
Silver	Ofir Shaham; Diana Svertsov; Adar Friedmann; Romi Paritzki; Shani Bakanov	Gymnastics	Women's rhythmic group all-around	10 August
Bronze	Peter Paltchik	Judo	Men's −100 kg	1 August

Medals by gender
Gender	1st place, gold medalist(s)	2nd place, silver medalist(s)	3rd place, bronze medalist(s)	Total
Male	1	1	1	3
Female	0	4	0	4
Mixed	0	0	0	0
Total	1	5	1	7

== Competitors ==
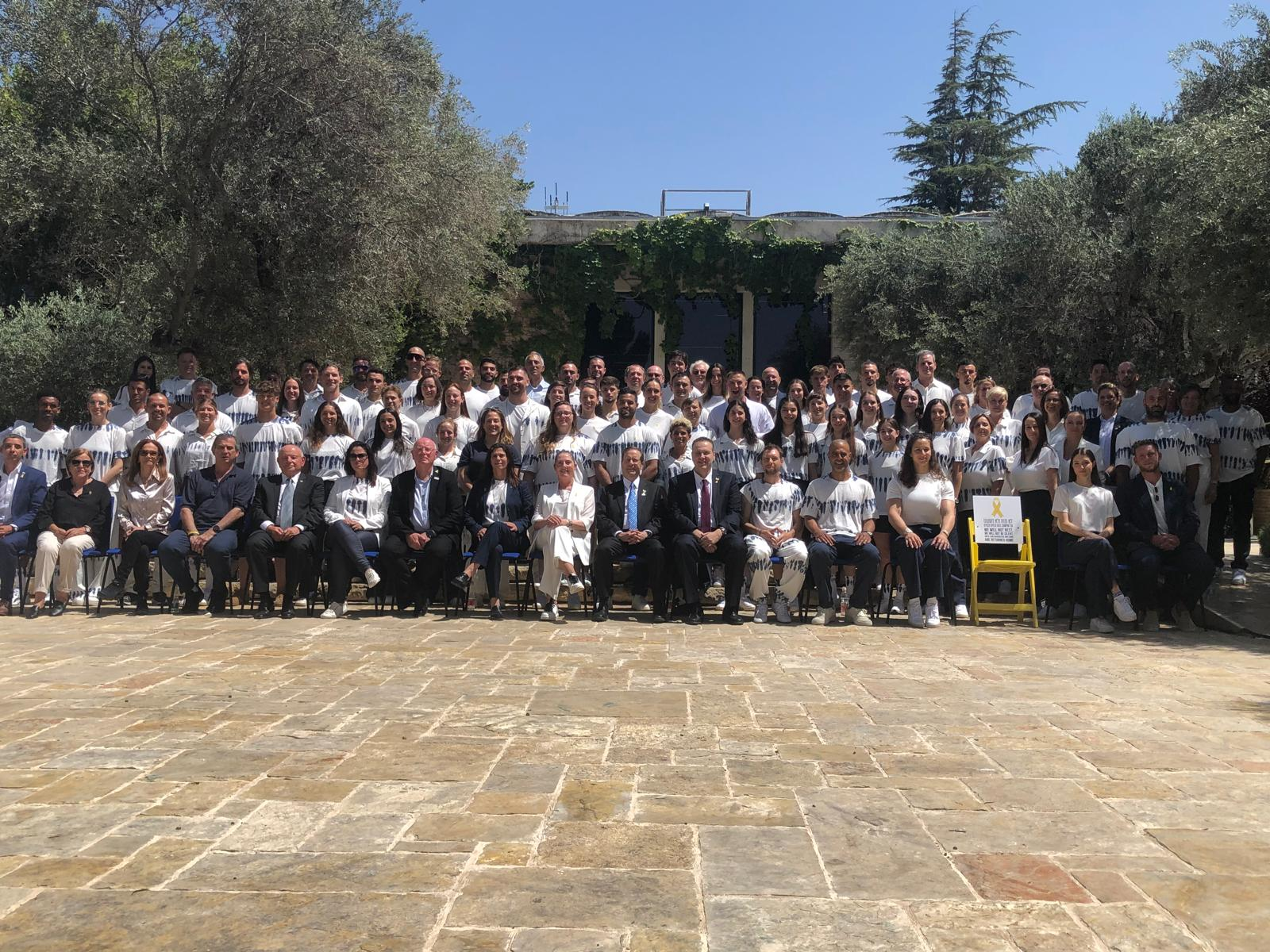
2024 Israel Olympic Team at the President's House

The following is the list of number of competitors in the Games. Note that reserve athletes are not counted:

Sport	Men	Women	Total
Archery	1	1	2
Artistic swimming	0	2	2
Athletics	4	2	6
Badminton	1	0	1
Cycling	3	1	4
Equestrian	2	2	4
Fencing	1	0	1
Football	18	0	18
Gymnastics	1	7	8
Judo	5	7	12
Sailing	4	4	8
Shooting	1	0	1
Surfing	0	1	1
Swimming	12	6	18
Taekwondo	0	1	1
Triathlon	1	0	1
Total	54	34	88

== Archery ==
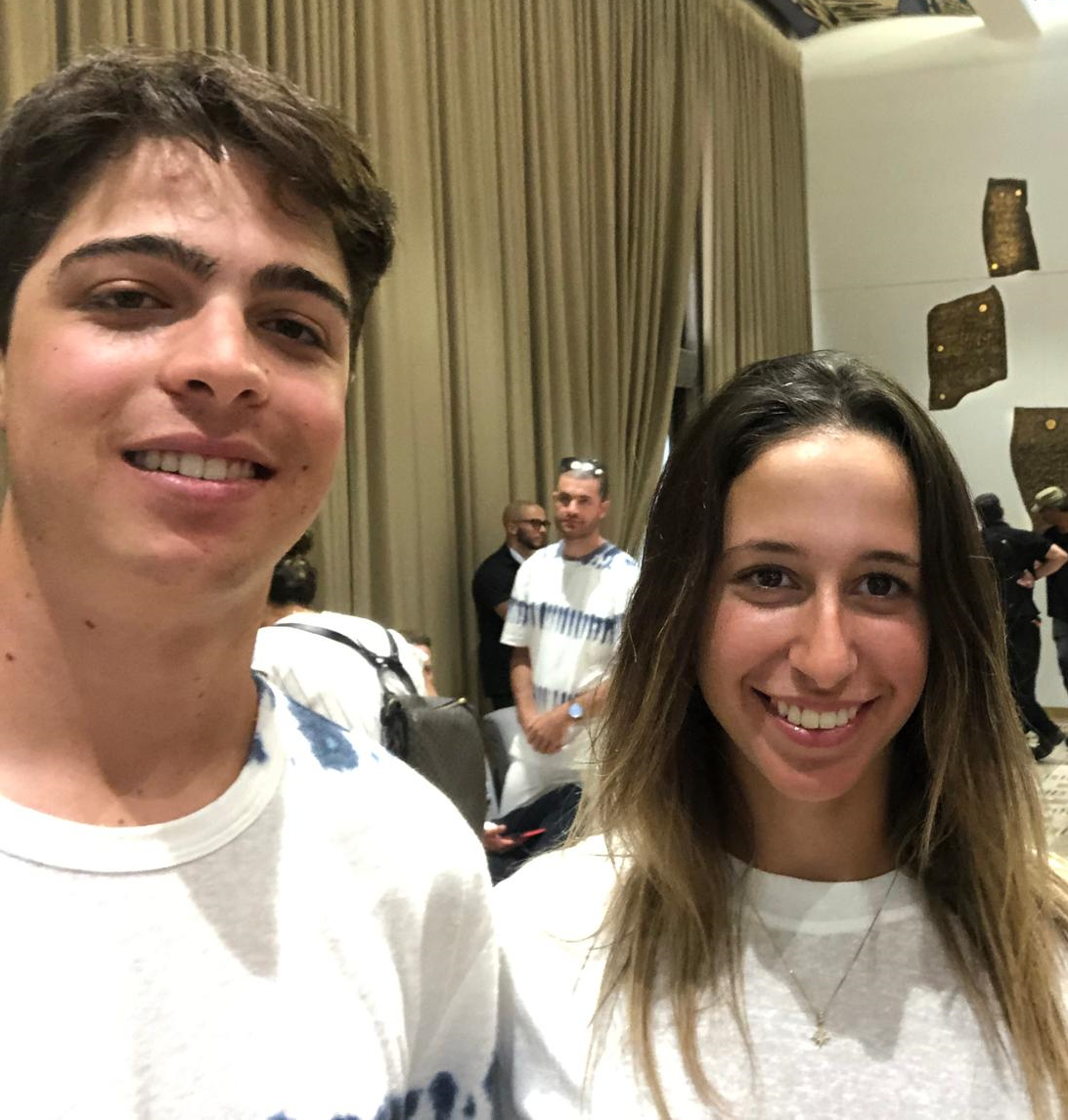
Israeli archers Roy Dror and Mikaella Moshe

Israel qualified two archers (one per gender) in the individual recurve and mixed team events, through the final release of the Olympic ranking for Paris 2024.

Athlete	Event	Ranking round		Round of 64	Round of 32	Round of 16	Quarterfinals	Semifinals	Final / BM	
Athlete	Event	Score	Seed	Opposition Score	Opposition Score	Opposition Score	Opposition Score	Opposition Score	Opposition Score	Rank
Roy Dror	Men's individual	655	42	Wijler (NED); L 2–6	Did not advance					33
Mikaella Moshe	Women's individual	660	18	Amăistroaie (ROU); L 1–7	Did not advance					33
Roy Dror; Mikaella Moshe	Mixed team	1315	18	—N/a		Did not advance				18

== Artistic swimming ==
Israel qualified two athletes to compete in the women's duet as a result of high rank at the 2024 World Aquatics Championships in Doha, Qatar.

Athlete	Event	Technical routine		Free routine		Total	
Athlete	Event	Points	Rank	Points	Rank	Points	Rank
Shelly Bobritsky; Ariel Nassee	Duet	243.0666	9	239.3416	11	482.4082	11

== Athletics ==
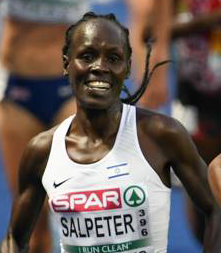
Lonah Chemtai Salpeter

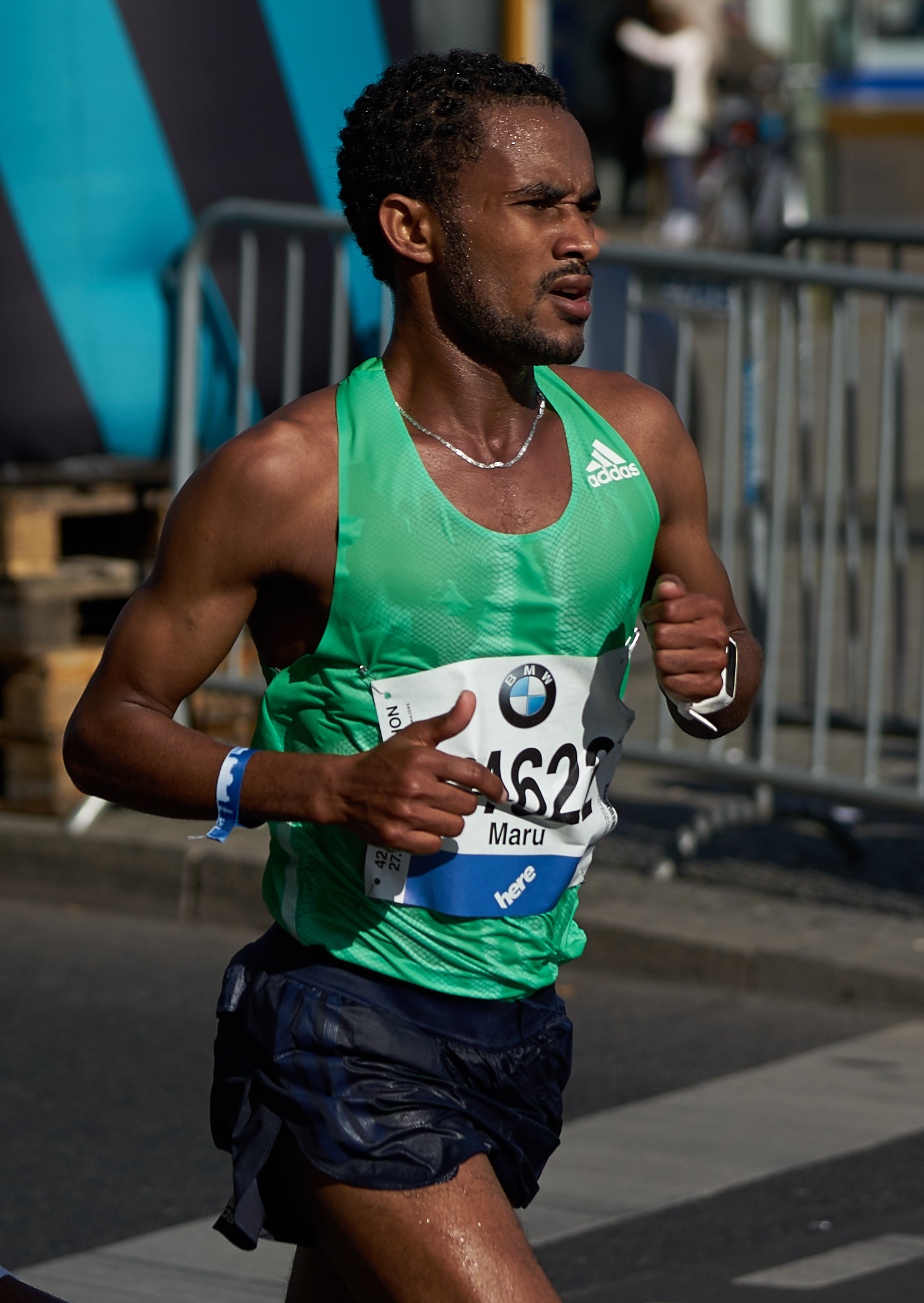
Maru Teferi

Israeli track and field athletes achieved the entry standards for Paris 2024, either by passing the direct qualifying mark (or time for track and road races) or by world ranking, in the following events (a maximum of 3 athletes each):

Key

- Note–Ranks given for track events are within the athlete's heat only
- Q = Qualified for the next round
- q = Qualified for the next round as a fastest loser or, in field events, by position without achieving the qualifying target
- NR = National record
- N/A = Round not applicable for the event
- Bye = Athlete not required to compete in round

Track & road events

Athlete	Event	Heat		Repechage		Semifinal		Final	
Athlete	Event	Result	Rank	Result	Rank	Result	Rank	Result	Rank
Blessing Afrifah	Men's 200 m	20.78	5 R	20.88	4	Did not advance			
Maru Teferi	Men's marathon	—N/a						2:10:42 SB	26
Gashau Ayale	Men's marathon	—N/a						2:11:36	31
Girmaw Amare	Men's marathon	—N/a						2:12:51 SB	44
Lonah Chemtai Salpeter	Women's marathon	—N/a						2:26:08 SB	9
Maor Tiyouri	Women's marathon	—N/a						2:33:37	49

== Badminton ==
Israel entered one badminton player into the Olympic tournament based on the BWF Race to Paris Rankings.

Athlete	Event	Group stage				Elimination	Quarter-final	Semi-final	Final / BM	
Athlete	Event	Opposition Score	Opposition Score	Opposition Score	Rank	Opposition Score	Opposition Score	Opposition Score	Opposition Score	Rank
Misha Zilberman	Men's singles	Nguyen (IRL); L (17–21, 21–19, 13–21)	Axelsen (DEN); L (9–21, 11–21)	Dahal (NEP); W (21–12, 21–10)	3	Did not advance				27

== Cycling ==
=== Road ===
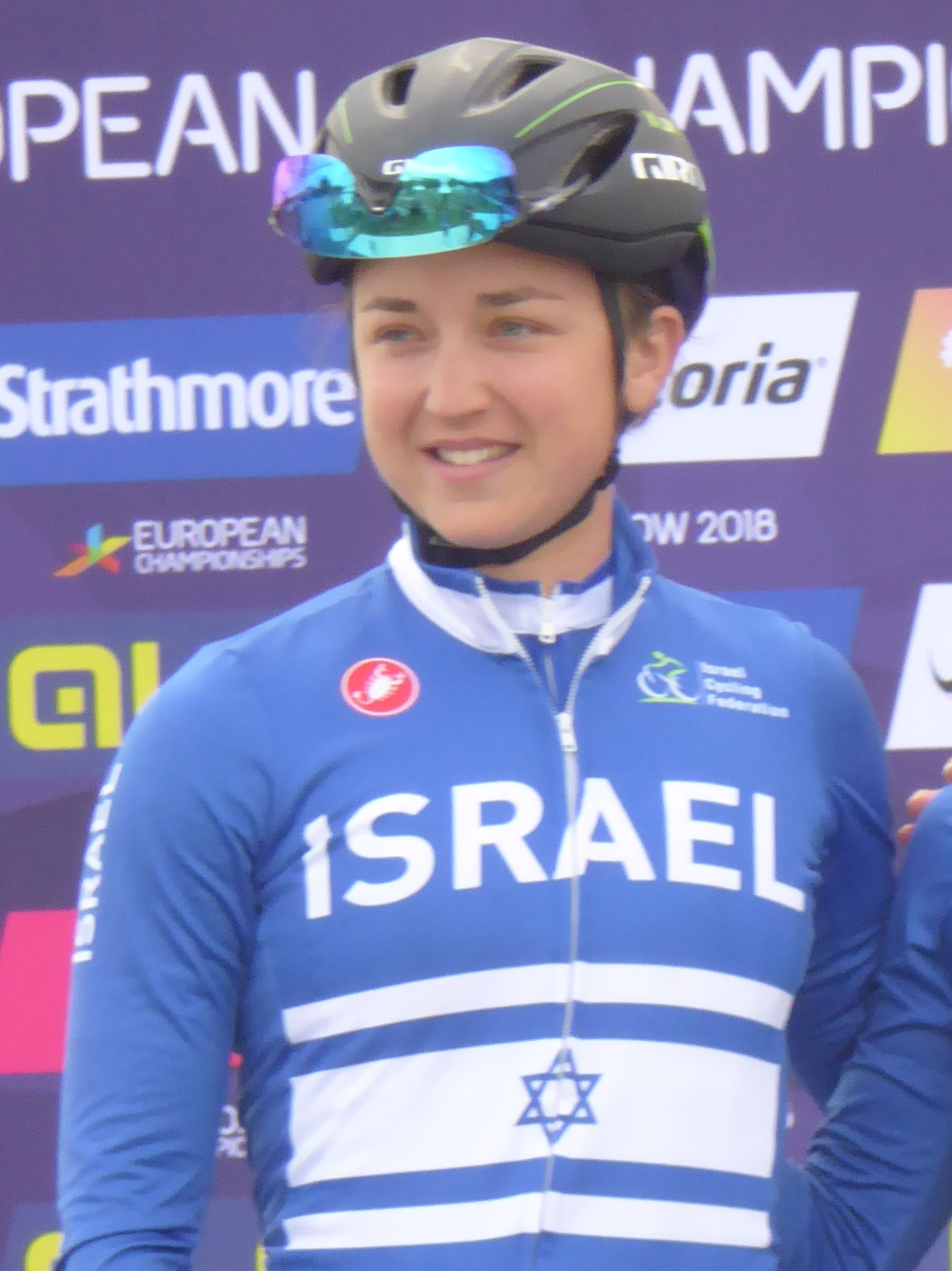
Rotem Gafinovitz

Israel qualified one male cyclist by finishing 39th in the UCI Nation Ranking, and one female cyclist by finishing 44th in the UCI Nation Ranking.

Athlete	Event	Time	Ranking
Itamar Einhorn	Men's road race	6:39:27	62
Rotem Gafinovitz	Women's road race	4:13:42	77

=== Track ===
Israel qualified two riders for the men's sprint and keirin events following the release of the final UCI Olympic rankings, but chose to send only one rider to compete.

Sprint

Athlete	Event	Qualification		Round 1	Repechage 1	Round 2	Repechage 2	Round 3	Repechage 3	Quarterfinals	Semifinals	Finals / BM	
Athlete	Event	Time Speed (km/h)	Rank	Opposition Time Speed (km/h)	Opposition Time Speed (km/h)	Opposition Time Speed (km/h)	Opposition Time Speed (km/h)	Opposition Time Speed (km/h)	Opposition Time Speed (km/h)	Opposition Time Speed (km/h)	Opposition Time Speed (km/h)	Opposition Time Speed (km/h)	Rank
Mikhail Iakovlev	Men's sprint	9.152; 78.671	3 Q	Sahrom (MAS); W 9.779; 73.627	—N/a	Tjon En Fa (SUR); W 9.895; 72.764	—N/a	Turnbull (GBR); L 9.741; 73.922	Rudyk (POL); Awang (MAS); L 10.020; 72.246	Did not advance			9

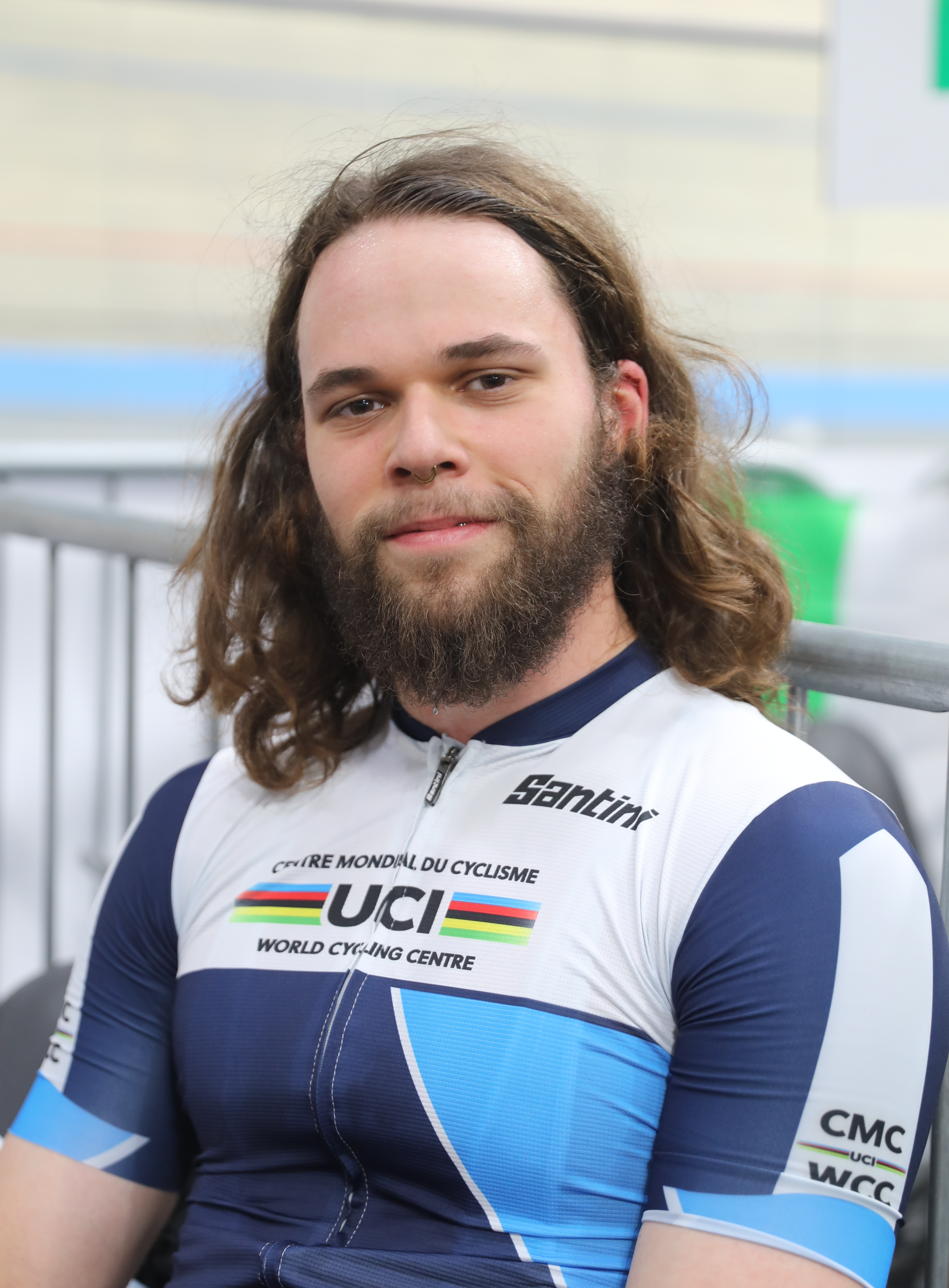
Mikhail Iakovlev

Keirin

Athlete	Event	Round 1	Repechage	Quarterfinals	Semifinals	Final	Rank
Athlete	Event	Rank	Rank	Rank	Rank	Rank	Rank
Mikhail Iakovlev	Men's keirin	1 Q	—N/a	5	Did not advance		13

=== Mountain biking ===
Israel qualified one man mountain biker based on the UCI Mountain biking Olympic Qualification Ranking due to reallocations of unused quota places.

Athlete	Event	Time	Rank
Tomer Zaltsman	Men's cross-country	1:34:47	29

== Equestrian ==
Israel fielded a squad of three equestrian riders into the team jumping competitions by winning at the International Equestrian Federation designated Olympic jumping qualifier for Group C (Central and Eastern Europe) in Prague, Czech Republic. Isabella Russekoff on C Vier 2 was reserve for the team competition. She participated in the individual competition.

=== Jumping ===
Athlete	Horse	Event	Qualification		Final		
Athlete	Horse	Event	Penalties	Rank	Penalties	Time	Rank
Daniel Bluman	Ladriano Z	Individual	RT		Did not advance		
Robin Muhr	Galaxy HM	Individual	8	42	Did not advance		
Isabella Russekoff	C Vier 2	Individual	20	64	Did not advance		
Daniel Bluman; Ashlee Bond; Robin Muhr	Ladriano Z Donatello 141; Galaxy HM	Team	20	9 Q	33	157.45	9

== Fencing ==
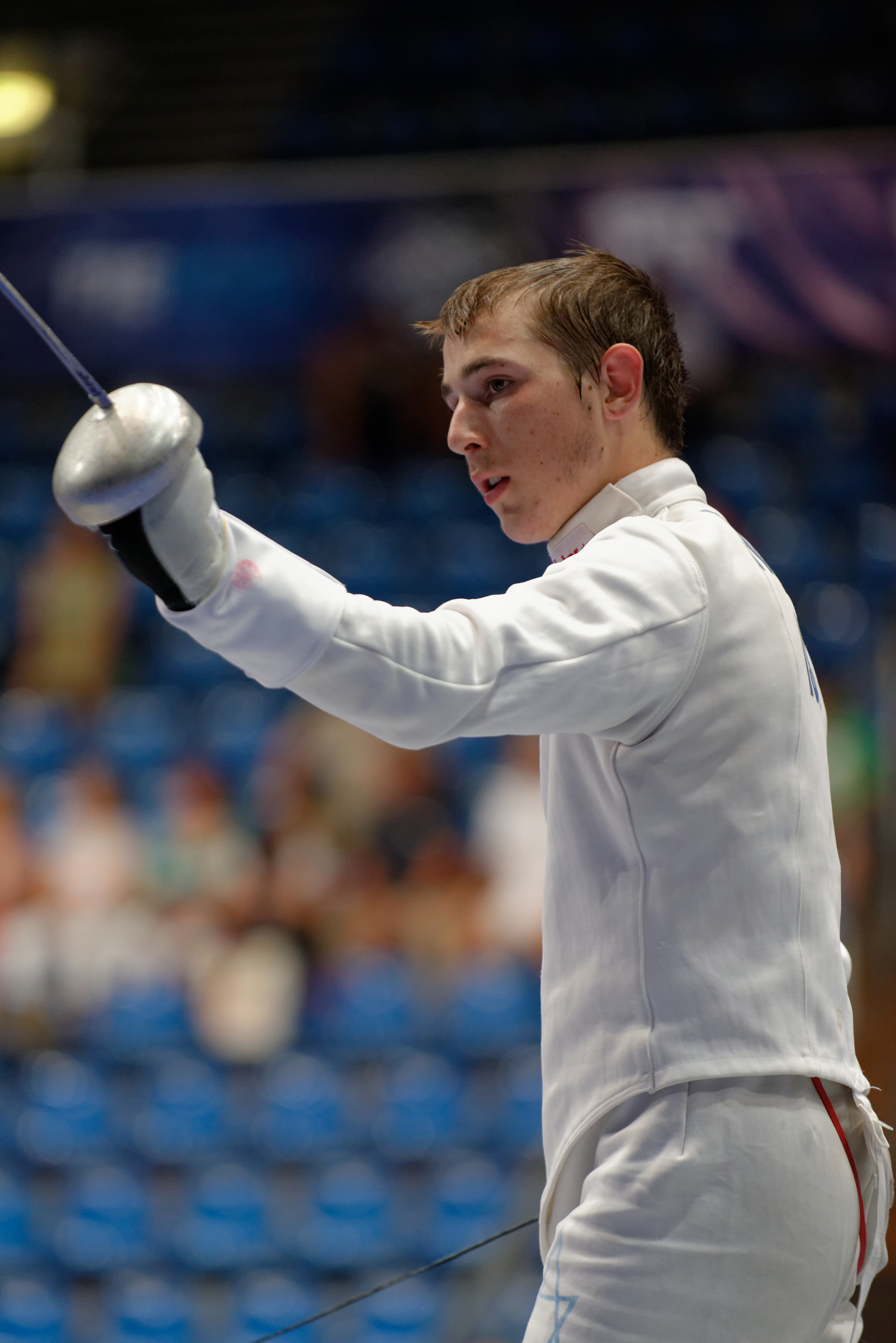
Yuval Freilich

For the first time since 2008, Israel entered one fencer into the Olympic competition. Yuval Freilich secured his quota place in men's épée, as one of the two highest-ranked individual fencers in the European zone in the FIE Official ranking for Paris 2024.

Athlete	Event	Round of 64	Round of 32	Round of 16	Quarterfinal	Semifinal	Final / BM	
Athlete	Event	Opposition Score	Opposition Score	Opposition Score	Opposition Score	Opposition Score	Opposition Score	Rank
Yuval Freilich	Men's épée	Bye	Santarelli (ITA); L 13–15	Did not advance				19

== Football ==
=== Summary ===
Key:

- A.E.T – After extra time.
- P – Match decided by penalty-shootout.

Team	Event	Group Stage				Quarterfinal	Semifinal	Final / BM	
Team	Event	Opposition Score	Opposition Score	Opposition Score	Rank	Opposition Score	Opposition Score	Opposition Score	Rank
Israel men's	Men's tournament	Mali; D 1–1	Paraguay; L 2–4	Japan; L 0–1	4	Did not advance			15

=== Men's tournament ===
Israel men's football team qualified for the Olympics by advancing to the semifinals of the 2023 UEFA European Under-21 Championship in Georgia and Romania, marking the nation's return to the sport for the first time since Montreal 1976.

Team roster

Israel announced a 29-men preliminary squad on 23 May 2024. The final squad was released on 2 July. Omer Nir'on replaced the injured Daniel Peretz on 18 July, while Roy Sason was called-up as an alternate player.

Head coach: Guy Luzon

No.	Pos.	Player	Date of birth (age)	Caps	Goals	Club
1	GK	Omer Nir'on	17 April 2001 (aged 23)	0	0	(Israel Football Association) Maccabi Netanya
2	DF	Ilay Feingold	23 August 2004 (aged 19)	0	0	(Israel Football Association) Maccabi Haifa
3	DF	Sean Goldberg*	25 August 1995 (aged 28)	0	0	(Israel Football Association) Maccabi Haifa
4	DF	Stav Lemkin	2 April 2003 (aged 21)	0	0	(Ukrainian Association of Football) Shakhtar Donetsk
5	DF	Roy Revivo	22 May 2003 (aged 21)	0	0	(Israel Football Association) Maccabi Tel Aviv
6	MF	Omri Gandelman* (captain)	16 May 2000 (aged 24)	0	0	(Royal Belgian Football Association) Gent
7	DF	Osher Davida	18 February 2001 (aged 23)	0	0	(Israel Football Association) Maccabi Tel Aviv
8	MF	Ethan Azoulay	26 May 2002 (aged 22)	0	0	(Israel Football Association) Maccabi Netanya
9	FW	Dor Turgeman	24 October 2003 (aged 20)	0	0	(Israel Football Association) Maccabi Tel Aviv
10	MF	Oscar Gloukh	1 April 2004 (aged 20)	0	0	(Austrian Football Association) Red Bull Salzburg
11	FW	Liel Abada	3 October 2001 (aged 22)	0	0	(United States Soccer Federation) Charlotte FC
12	DF	Noam Ben Harush	13 May 2005 (aged 19)	0	0	(Israel Football Association) Hapoel Haifa
13	FW	Elad Madmon	10 February 2004 (aged 20)	0	0	(Israel Football Association) Maccabi Tel Aviv
14	MF	Ayano Preda	29 April 2002 (aged 22)	0	0	(Israel Football Association) Hapoel Jerusalem
15	MF	Adi Yona	17 April 2004 (aged 20)	0	0	(Israel Football Association) Beitar Jerusalem
16	DF	Or Israelov	2 September 2004 (aged 19)	0	0	(Israel Football Association) Hapoel Tel Aviv
17	MF	Ido Shahar	20 August 2001 (aged 22)	0	0	(Israel Football Association) Maccabi Tel Aviv
18	GK	Niv Eliasi	1 February 2002 (aged 22)	0	0	(Israel Football Association) Hapoel Be'er Sheva
22	GK	Roy Sason	13 December 2001 (aged 22)	0	0	(Israel Football Association) Bnei Yehuda Tel Aviv

* Overage player.

Group play

Pos	Team	Pld	W	D	L	GF	GA	GD	Pts	Qualification
1	Japan	3	3	0	0	7	0	+7	9	Advance to knockout stage
2	Paraguay	3	2	0	1	5	7	−2	6	Advance to knockout stage
3	Mali	3	0	1	2	1	3	−2	1	
4	Israel	3	0	1	2	3	6	−3	1	

Source: FIFA
Rules for classification: Group stage tiebreakers
24 July 2024
21:00

Mali	1–1	Israel
Doumbia 63'	Report	H. Diallo 56' (o.g.)

Parc des Princes, Paris
Attendance: 26,305
Referee: Campbell-Kirk Kawana-Waugh (New Zealand)

27 July 2024
19:00

Israel	2–4	Paraguay
Gandelman 53'; Gloukh 80'	Report	M. Fernández 25', 90+6'; Enciso 69'; Balbuena 90+3'

Parc des Princes, Paris
Attendance: 28,887
Referee: Drew Fischer (Canada)

30 July 2024
21:00

Israel	0–1	Japan
	Report	Hosoya 90+1'

Stade de la Beaujoire, Nantes
Attendance: 11,671
Referee: Saíd Martínez (Honduras)

== Gymnastics ==
=== Artistic ===
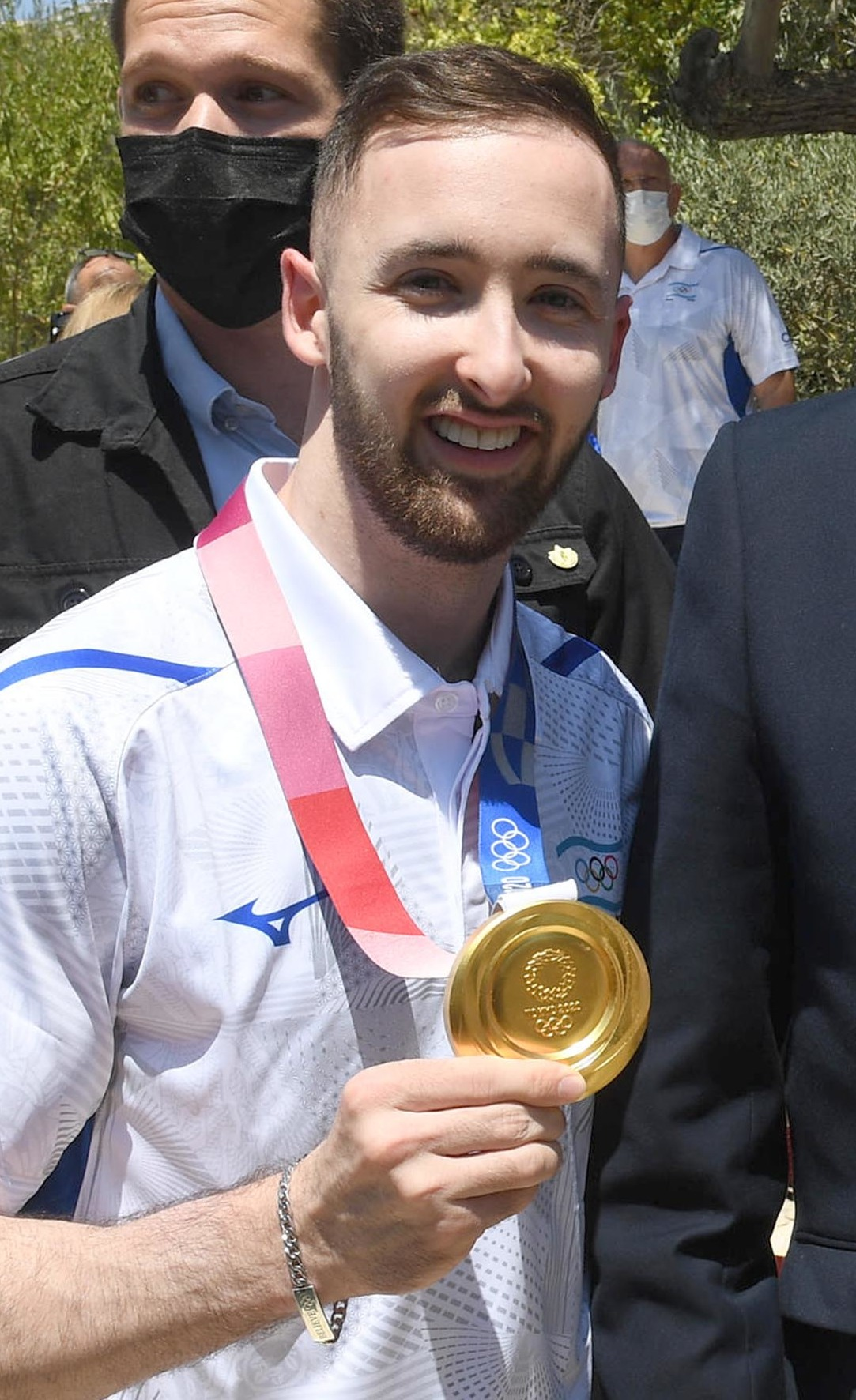
2020 Olympic gold medalist Artem Dolgopyat

Israel qualified two gymnasts, Artem Dolgopyat and Lihie Raz, by their being among the highest-ranked eligible athletes in the All-around at the 2023 World Artistic Gymnastics Championships.

Men

Athlete	Event	Qualification								Final							
Athlete	Event	Apparatus						Total	Rank	Apparatus						Total	Rank
Athlete	Event	F	PH	R	V	PB	HB	Total	Rank	F	PH	R	V	PB	HB	Total	Rank
Artem Dolgopyat	Floor	14.466	—N/a					14.466	7 Q	14.966	—N/a					14.966	2nd place, silver medalist(s)
Artem Dolgopyat	Pommel horse	—N/a	13.000	—N/a				13.000	46	Did not advance							

Women

Athlete	Event	Qualification						Final					
Athlete	Event	Apparatus				Total	Rank	Apparatus				Total	Rank
Athlete	Event	V	UB	BB	F	Total	Rank	V	UB	BB	F	Total	Rank
Lihie Raz	All-around	13.666	12.833	12.300	12.833	51.632	31 R1	Did not advance					
Lihie Raz	Vault	13.449	—N/a			13.449	16	Did not advance					

=== Rhythmic ===
Israel entered a squad of rhythmic gymnasts to compete in the group all-around competition, following the nation's successful runner-up at the 2022 World Championships in Sofia, Bulgaria. Additionally, Israel also entered an individual gymnast through the individual all-round qualifications at the 2023 World Championships in Valencia, Spain.

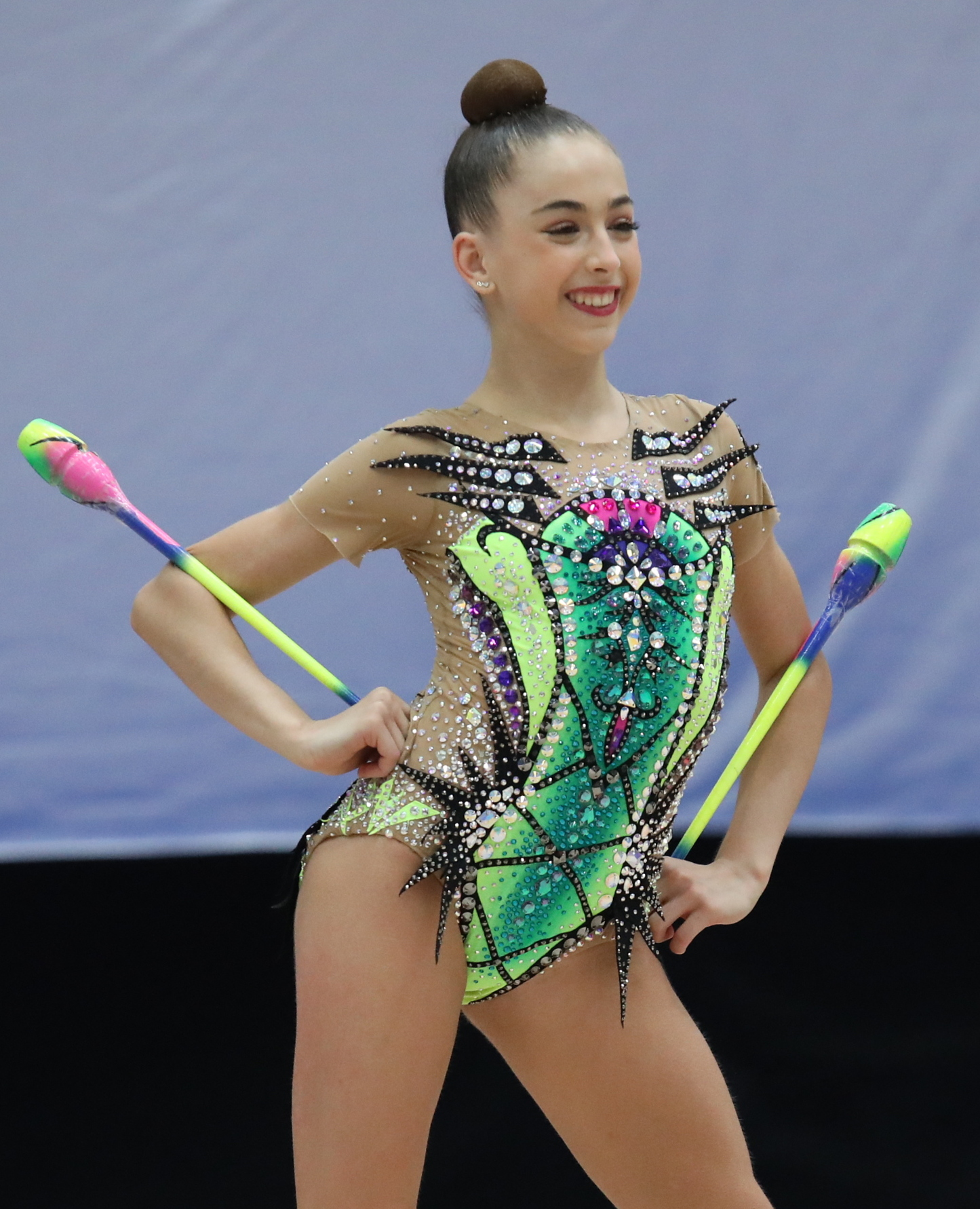
Daria Atamanov

Athlete	Event	Qualification						Final					
Athlete	Event	Hoop	Ball	Clubs	Ribbon	Total	Rank	Hoop	Ball	Clubs	Ribbon	Total	Rank
Daria Atamanov	Individual	33.250	32.700	32.100	32.400	130.450	7 Q	35.200	31.800	33.850	33.000	133.850	5

Athletes	Event	Qualification				Final			
Athletes	Event	5 apps	3+2 apps	Total	Rank	5 apps.	3+2 apps	Total	Rank
Ofir Shaham; Diana Svertsov; Adar Friedmann; Romi Paritzki; Shani Bakanov	Group	35.250	31.900	67.150	6 Q	35.600	33.250	68.850	2nd place, silver medalist(s)

== Judo ==
Judoka listed are those who secured qualification.

Men

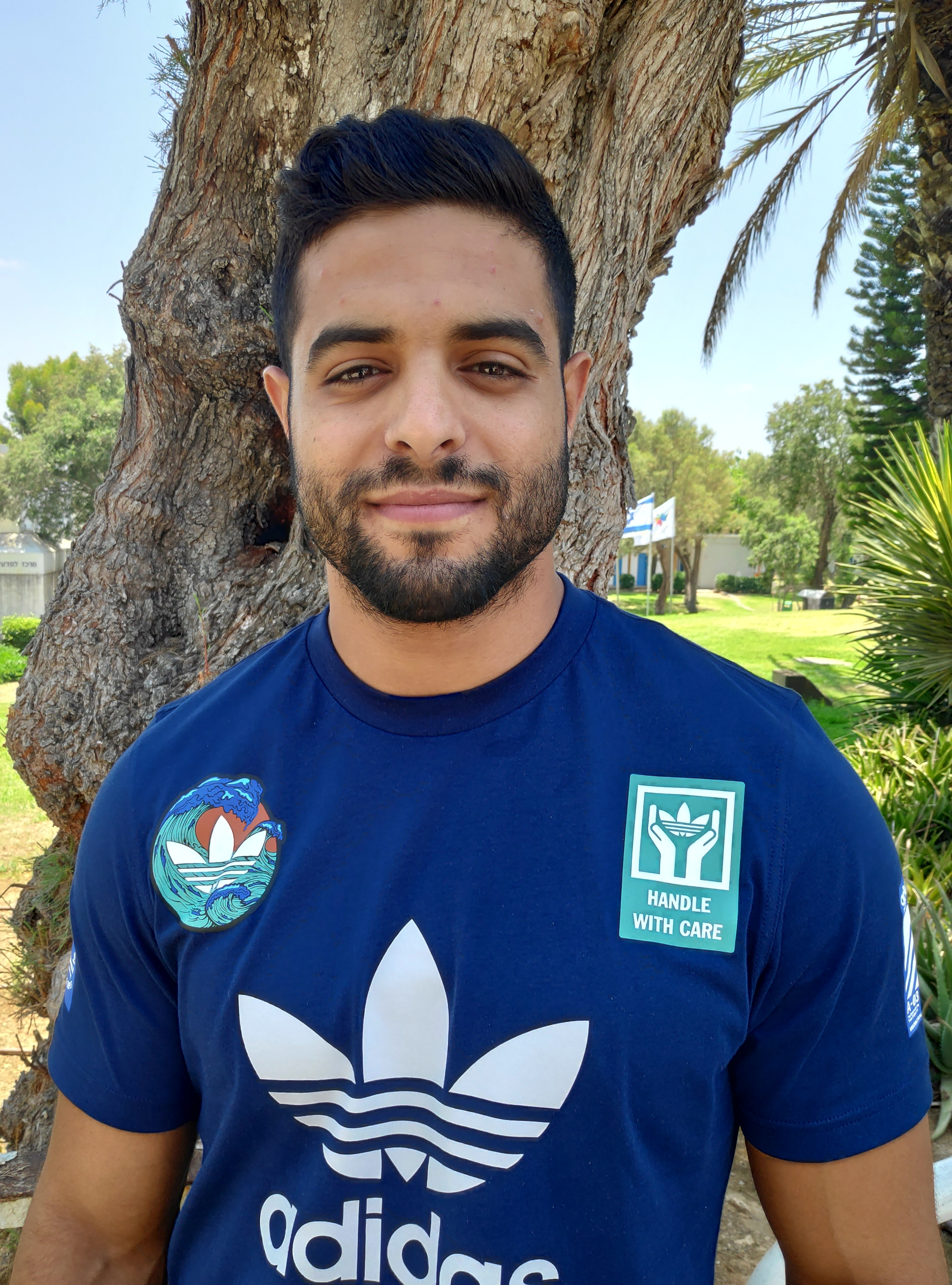
Sagi Muki

Athlete	Event	Round of 64	Round of 32	Round of 16	Quarterfinals	Semifinals	Repechage	Final / BM	Rank
Athlete	Event	Opposition Result	Opposition Result	Opposition Result	Opposition Result	Opposition Result	Opposition Result	Opposition Result	Rank
Yam Wolczak	−60 kg	—N/a	Kisoka (COD); W 10–00	Sardalashvili (GEO); L 00–11	Did not advance				9
Baruch Shmailov	−66 kg	—N/a	Boushita (MAR); W 01–00	Emomali (TJK); L 00–01	Did not advance				9
Tohar Butbul	−73 kg	—N/a	~~Dris (ALG)~~(DSQ); W 10–00	Heydarov (AZE); L 00–10	Did not advance				9
Sagi Muki	−81 kg	Bye	Cavelius (GER); W 10–00	Lee (KOR); L 00–10	Did not advance				9
Peter Paltchik	−100 kg	—N/a	Gonchigsüren (MGL); W 10–00	Diesse (FRA); W 10–00	Kotsoiev (AZE); L 00–01	Did not advance	Korrel (NED); W 10–00	Eich (SUI); W 01–00	3rd place, bronze medalist(s)

Women

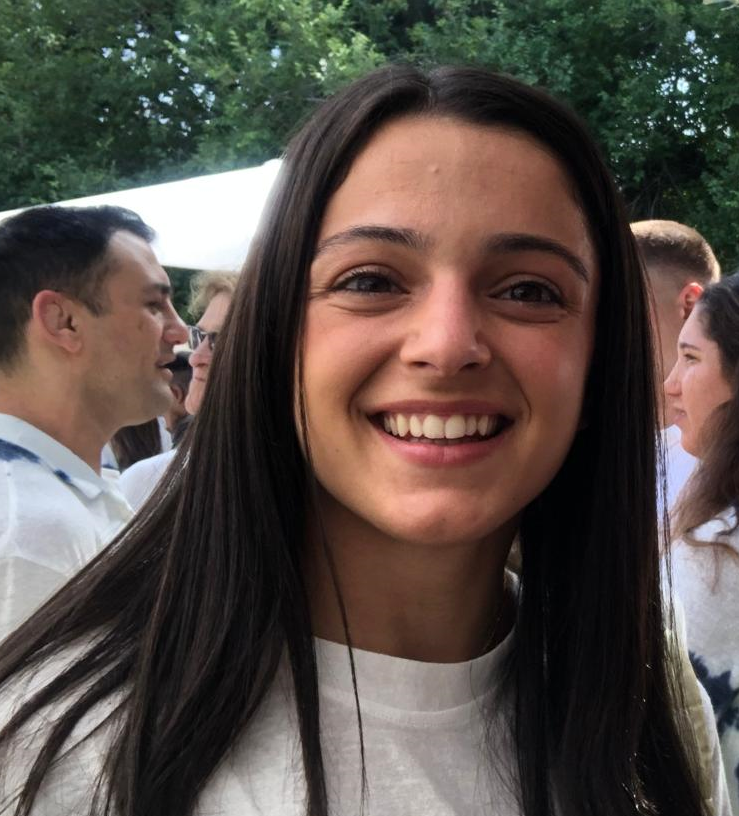
Gefen Primo

Athlete	Event	Round of 32	Round of 16	Quarterfinals	Semifinals	Repechage	Final / BM	Rank
Athlete	Event	Opposition Result	Opposition Result	Opposition Result	Opposition Result	Opposition Result	Opposition Result	Rank
Shira Rishony	−48 kg	Abuzhakynova (KAZ); L 00–01	Did not advance					17
Gefen Primo	−52 kg	Jung (KOR); W 10–00	Ndiaye (SUI); W 01–00	Krasniqi (KOS); L 00–10	Did not advance	Pupp (HUN); L 00–10	Did not advance	7
Timna Nelson-Levy	−57 kg	Kajzer (SLO); W 01–00	Huh (KOR); L 00–10	Did not advance				9
Gili Sharir	−63 kg	Agbegnenou (FRA); L 00–01	Did not advance					17
Maya Goshen	−70 kg	Ögel (TUR); W 10–00	Gahié (FRA); L 00–10	Did not advance				9
Inbar Lanir	−78 kg	Bye	Khüslen (MGL); W 10–00	Steenhuis (NED); W 10–00	Wagner (GER); W 10–00	—N/a	Bellandi (ITA); L 00–11	2nd place, silver medalist(s)
Raz Hershko	+78 kg	Bye	Kamps (NED); W 10–00	Žabić (SRB); W 10–00	Özdemir (TUR); W 10–00	—N/a	Souza (BRA); L 00–01	2nd place, silver medalist(s)

Mixed

Nations qualifying at least one athlete in the −57 (−48, −52 & −57), −70 (−57, −63 & −70) & +70 (−70, −78 & +78) weight categories for women, and at least one athlete in the −73 (−60, −66 & −73), −90 (−73, −81 & −90) & +90 (−90, −100 & +100) weight categories for men, would compete in the team event.

Team	Event	Round of 32	Round of 16	Quarterfinals	Semifinals	Repechage	Final / BM	Rank
Team	Event	Opposition Result	Opposition Result	Opposition Result	Opposition Result	Opposition Result	Opposition Result	Rank
Yam Wolczak; Baruch Shmailov; Tohar Butbul; Sagi Muki; Peter Paltchik; Shira Rishony; Gefen Primo; Timna Nelson-Levy; Gili Sharir; Maya Goshen; Inbar Lanir; Raz Hershko	Team	Mongolia; W 4–3	France; L 0–4	Did not advance				9

== Sailing ==
Israeli sailors qualified one boat in Men's and Women's iQFoil, Women's Formula Kite, and Mixed 470 through the 2023 Sailing World Championships in The Hague, Netherlands; They also qualified one boat in Men's Laser through the 2024 ILCA Senior European Championships in Athens, Greece. Additionally, Israeli sailors qualified one boat in Women's Laser Radial through the 2024 ILCA Senior European Championships after Portugal's quota from the 2023 Sailing World Championships was disqualified because Vasileia Karachaliou did not receive Portuguese citizenship and was not approved to representing Portugal.

Elimination events

Athlete	Event	Opening Series																						Final Series			Final rank
Athlete	Event	1	2	3	4	5	6	7	8	9	10	11	12	13	14	15	16	17	18	19	20	Net Points	Rank	QF	SF	F	Final rank
Tom Reuveny	Men's iQFoil	8	13	5	3	3	4	BFD; ~~(25)~~	3	5	13	~~14~~	4	2	Cancelled							63	2 Q	Bye	2 Q	1	1st place, gold medalist(s)
Sharon Kantor	Women's iQFoil	DSQ; ~~(25)~~	6	10	1	1	3	4	2	~~15~~	1	2	6	2	11	Cancelled						49	2 Q	Bye	1 Q	2	2nd place, silver medalist(s)

Athlete	Event	Opening Series																		Final Series												Final rank
Athlete	Event	1	2	3	4	5	6	7	8	9	10	11	12	13	14	15	16	Net Points	Rank	SF1	SF2	SF3	SF4	SF5	SF6	F1	F2	F3	F4	F5	F6	Final rank
Dor Zarka	Men's Formula Kite	15	3	DSQ; ~~(21)~~	9	12	UFD; ~~(21)~~	13	Cancelled									52	13	Did not advance												13
Gal Zukerman	Women's Formula Kite	10	9	10	~~11~~	5	11	Cancelled										45	10 Q	3	—N/a					Did not advance						8

Medal race events

Athlete	Event	Race											Net points	Final rank
Athlete	Event	1	2	3	4	5	6	7	8	9	10	M*	Net points	Final rank
Omer Vered Vilenchik	Men's ILCA7	38	3	7	~~40~~	36	37	20	25	C		EL	166	30
Shai Kakon	Women's ILCA6	22	33	12	7	31	~~34~~	25	10	18	C	EL	158	24
Noa Lasri; Nitai Hasson	Mixed 470	10	7	~~18~~	9	8	2	7	14	C		10	67	7

M = Medal race; EL = Eliminated – did not advance into the medal race

== Shooting ==
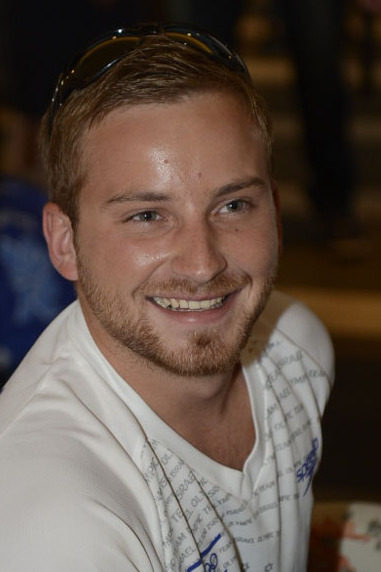
Sergey Richter

Israeli shooter Sergey Richter achieved quota places for the delegation in the men's 10 metre air rifle through the ISSF World Olympic Rankings after universality spots were reallocated. This will be his fourth appearance at the Olympics.

Athlete	Event	Qualification		Final	
Athlete	Event	Points	Rank	Points	Rank
Sergey Richter	Men's 10 m air rifle	626.4	33	Did not advance	

== Surfing ==
Israel surfers confirmed one shortboard quota place. Anat Lelior qualified for the games, by virtue of being one of the top eight individual women's surfers, not yet qualified, at the 2024 ISA World Surfing Games in Arecibo, Puerto Rico.

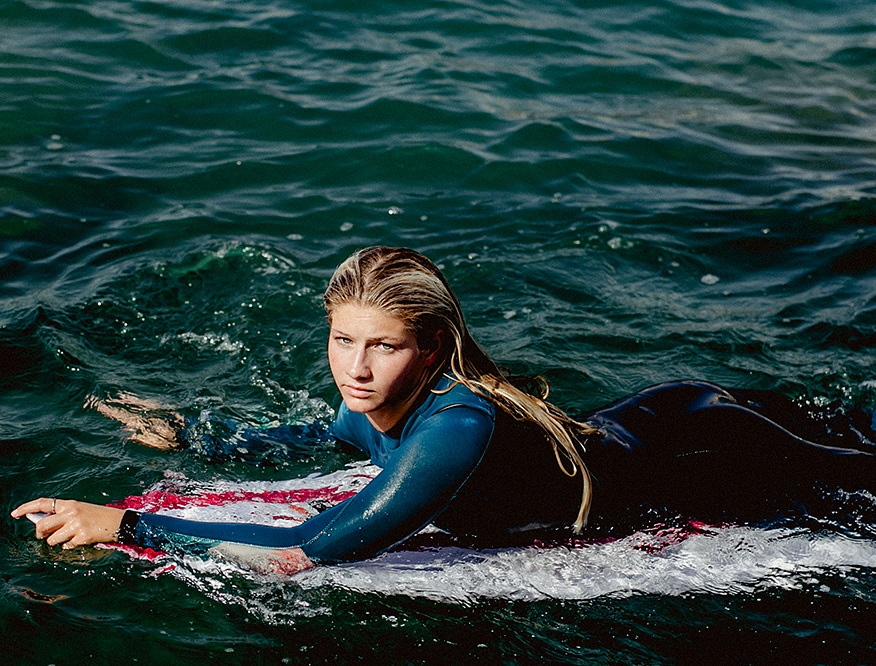
Anat Lelior

Athlete	Event	Round 1		Round 2	Round 3	Quarterfinal	Semifinal	Final / BM	
Athlete	Event	Score	Rank	Opposition Result	Opposition Result	Opposition Result	Opposition Result	Opposition Result	Rank
Anat Lelior	Women's shortboard	5.43	2 Q2	Gonzalez-Etxabarri (ESP); W 11.00–2.80	Wright (AUS); L 7.74–11.10	Did not advance			9

== Swimming ==
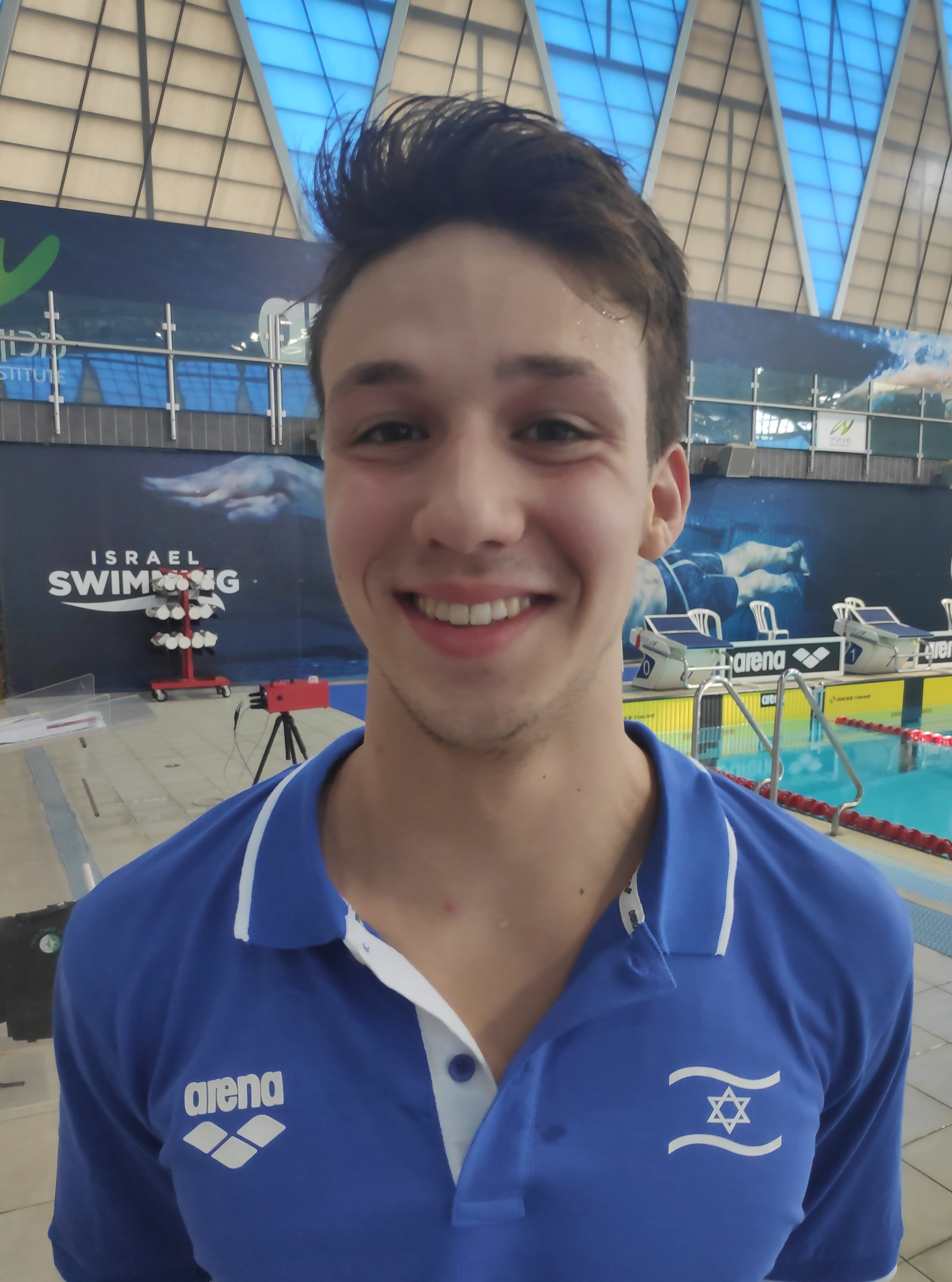
Gal Cohen Groumi

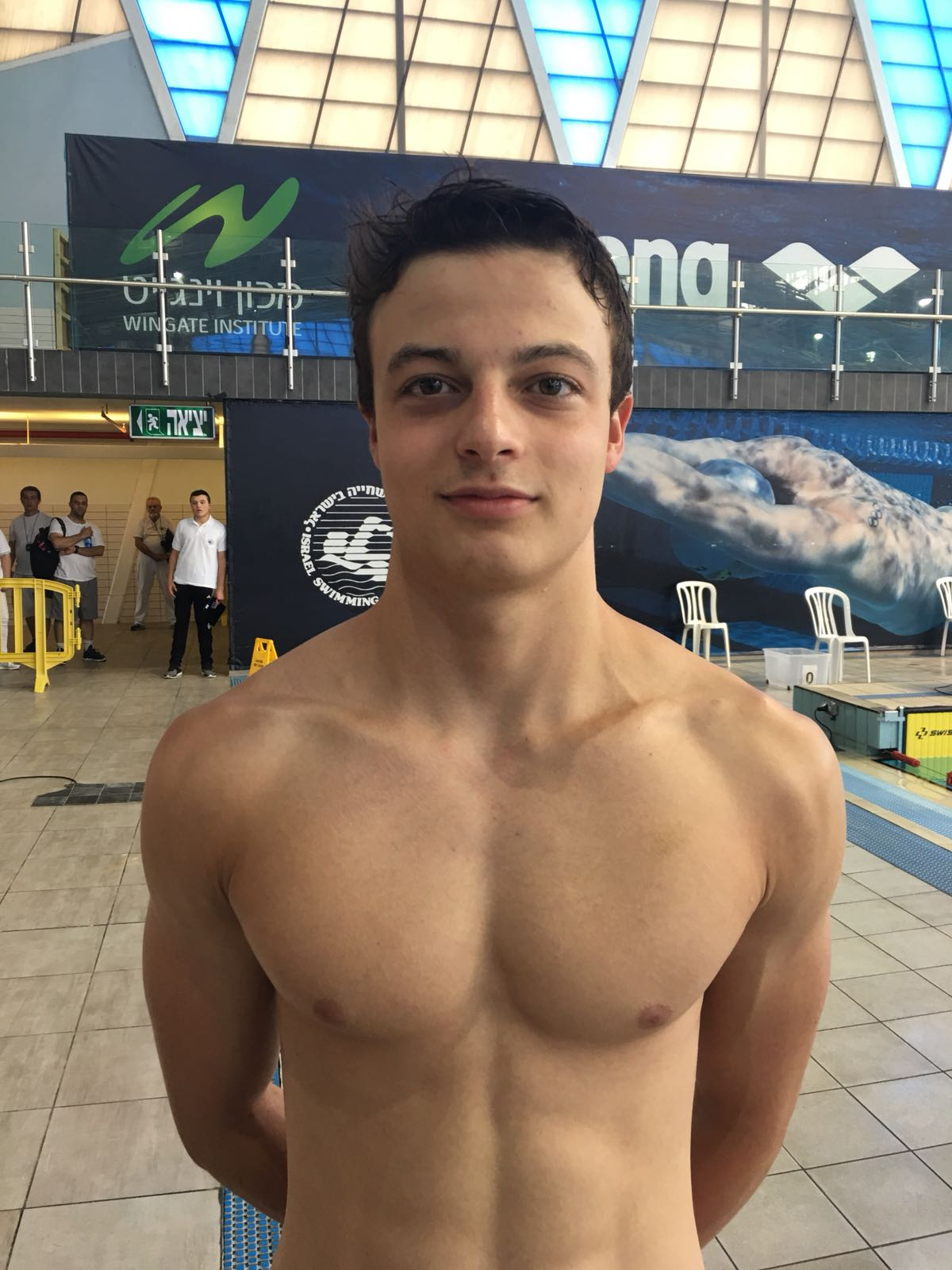
Tomer Frankel

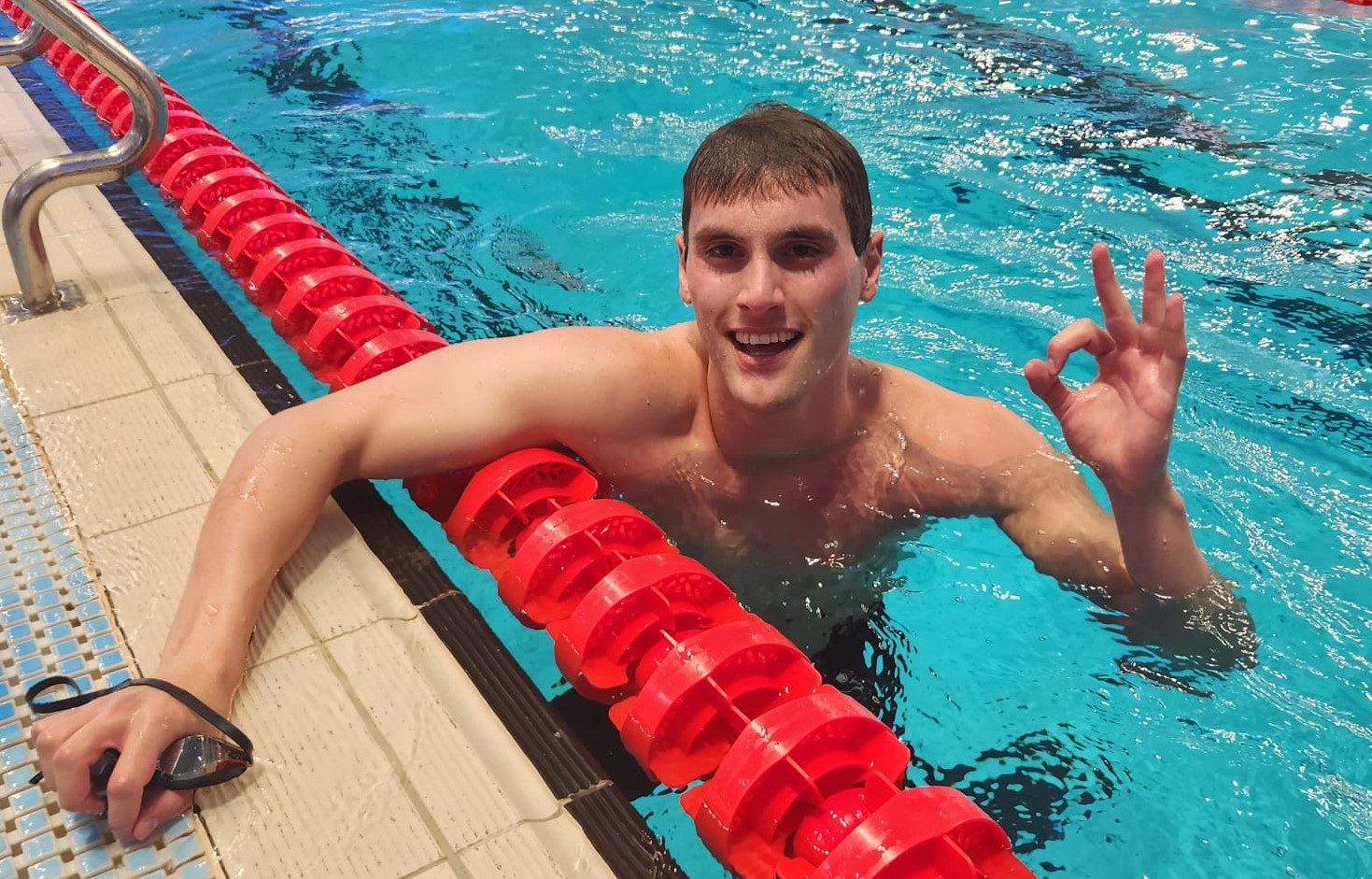
Adam Maraana

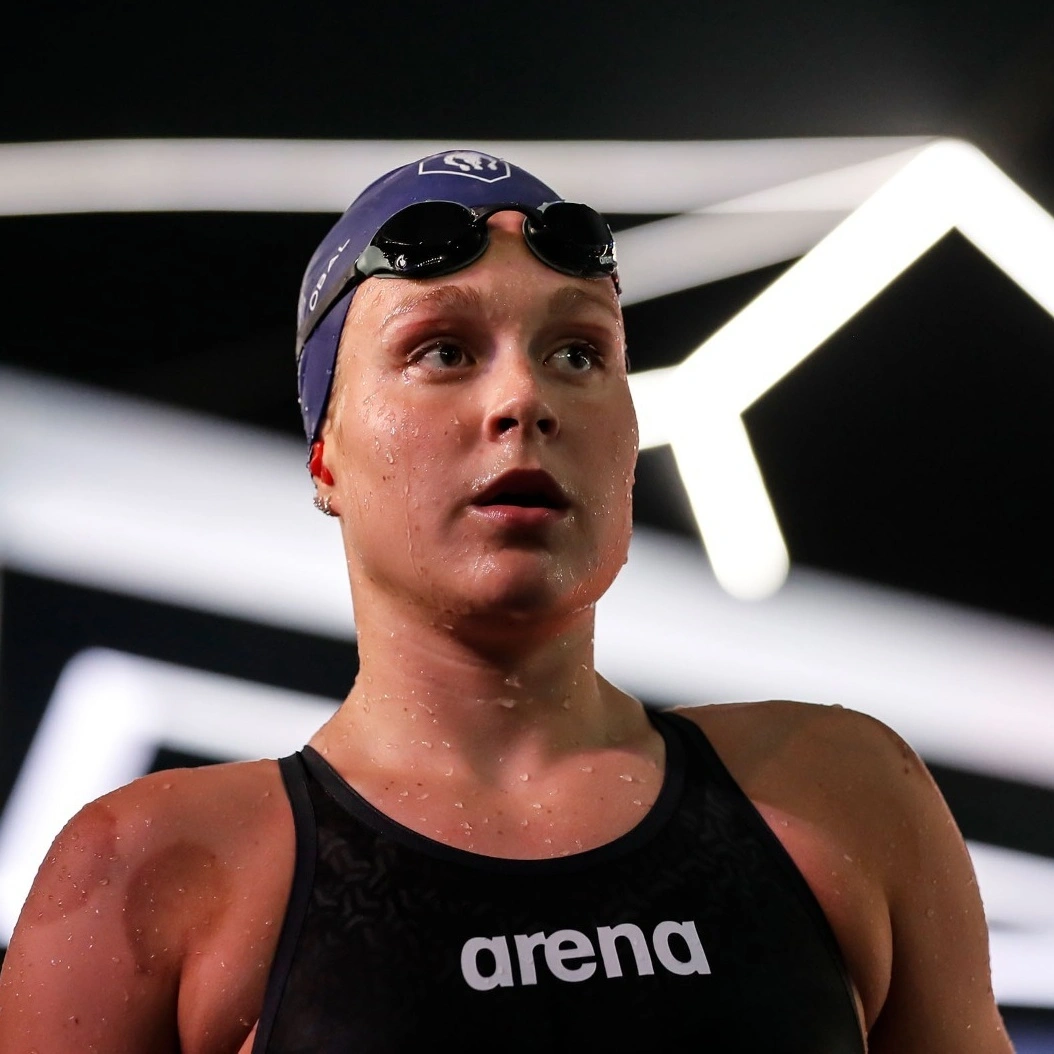
Anastasia Gorbenko

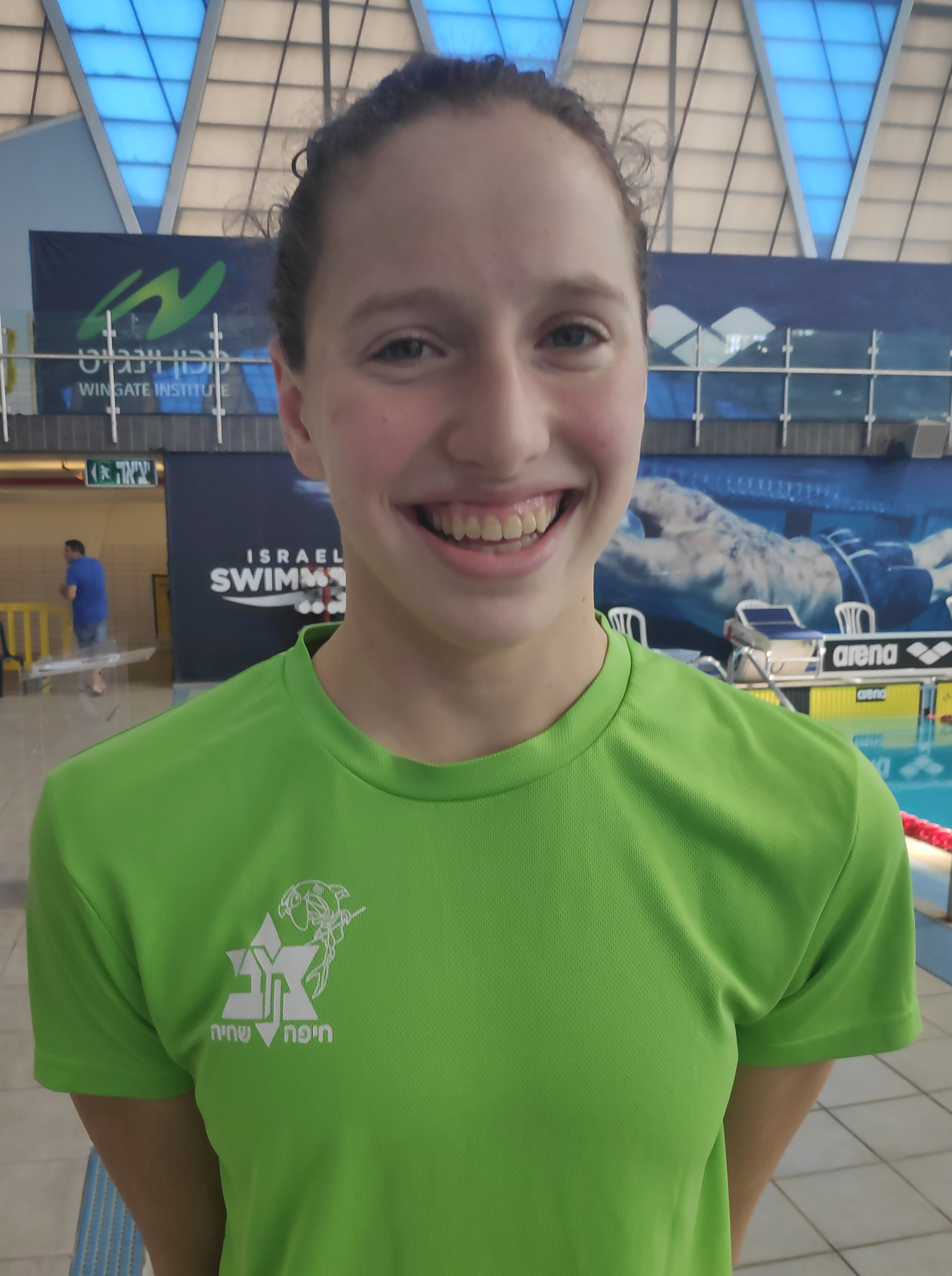
Lea Polonsky

Israeli swimmers achieved the entry standards in the following events for Paris 2024 (a maximum of two swimmers under the Olympic Qualifying Time (OST) and potentially at the Olympic Consideration Time (OCT)):

Men

Athlete	Event	Heat		Semifinal		Final	
Athlete	Event	Time	Rank	Time	Rank	Time	Rank
Meiron Cheruti	50 m freestyle	21.88	10 Q	21.91	13	Did not advance	
Martin Kartavi	50 m freestyle	22.01	19	Did not advance			
Tomer Frankel	100 m freestyle	48.66	21	Did not advance			
Tomer Frankel	100 m butterfly	51.94	21	Did not advance			
Denis Loktev	200 m freestyle	1:47.01	14 Q	1:47.93	16	Did not advance	
Gal Cohen Groumi	100 m butterfly	51.30	10 Q	51.48	12	Did not advance	
Adam Maraana	100 m backstroke	54.61	28	Did not advance			
David Gerchik	200 m backstroke	1:58.79	22	Did not advance			
Ron Polonsky	100 m breaststroke	1:00.00 NR	16 Q	1:00.37	16	Did not advance	
Ron Polonsky	200 m individual medley	1:58.30	=7 Q	1:58.89	12	Did not advance	
Tomer Frankel; Gal Cohen Groumi; Denis Loktev; Alexey Glivinskiy	4 × 100 m freestyle relay	3:15.41	14	—N/a		Did not advance	
Denis Loktev; Bar Soloveychik; Eitan Ben Shitrit; Gal Cohen Groumi	4 × 200 m freestyle relay	7:08.43 NR	=8 Q	—N/a		7:10.22	9
Matan Roditi	10 km open water	—N/a				1:57:02.3	16

Women

Athlete	Event	Heat		Semifinal		Final	
Athlete	Event	Time	Rank	Time	Rank	Time	Rank
Anastasia Gorbenko	200 m backstroke	2:10.29	13 Q	2:11.96	16	Did not advance	
Anastasia Gorbenko	100 m breaststroke	1:06.22	7 Q	Withdraw			
Anastasia Gorbenko	200 m individual medley	2:11.53	11 Q	2:10.32	9	Did not advance	
Anastasia Gorbenko	400 m individual medley	4:41.64	10	—N/a		Did not advance	
Aviv Barzelay	100 m backstroke	1:02.30	25	Did not advance			
Aviv Barzelay	200 m backstroke	2:10.71	18	Did not advance			
Lea Polonsky	200 m freestyle	2:00.38	19	Did not advance			
Lea Polonsky	200 m individual medley	2:17.53	28	Did not advance			
Anastasia Gorbenko; Daria Golovaty; Ayla Spitz; Lea Polonsky	4 × 200 m freestyle relay	7:55.99	11	—N/a		Did not advance	

Mixed

Athlete	Event	Heat		Final	
Athlete	Event	Time	Rank	Time	Rank
Anastasia Gorbenko; Gal Cohen Groumi; Ron Polonsky; Andrea Murez	4 × 100 m medley relay	3:45.33	10	Did not advance	

== Taekwondo ==
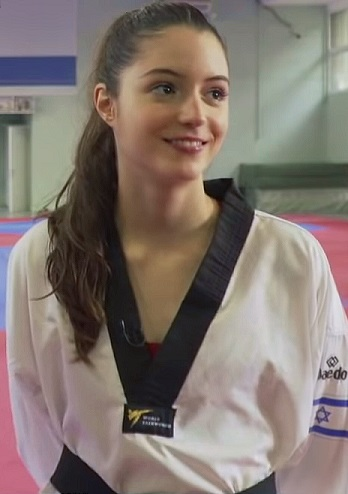
Avishag Semberg

Israel qualified one athlete. Tokyo 2020 bronze medalist Avishag Semberg qualified for Paris 2024 at the 2024 European Qualification Tournament in Sofia, Bulgaria.

Athlete	Event	Qualification	Round of 16	Quarterfinals	Semifinals	Repechage	Final / BM	
Athlete	Event	Opposition Result	Opposition Result	Opposition Result	Opposition Result	Opposition Result	Opposition Result	Rank
Avishag Semberg	Women's −49 kg	Bye	Abutaleb (KSA); L 1–2	Did not advance				11

== Triathlon ==
Israel qualified one male triathlete based on the World Triathlon Individual Olympic Qualification Ranking. Shachar Sagiv, who was the triathlete who qualified in the ranking, was selected to represent Israel in the 2024 Olympics.

Athlete	Event	Time						Rank
Athlete	Event	Swim (1.5 km)	Trans 1	Bike (40 km)	Trans 2	Run (10 km)	Total	Rank
Shachar Sagiv	Men's	21:31	0:48	54:33	0:27	32:13	1:49:32	37

== Controversies and protests ==
=== Calls for ban on participation ===
Palestinian sports organizations and sports organizations from Arab countries are calling for sanctions to be imposed against Israel and to prevent its participation in the 2024 Summer Olympics due to the Gaza war. The calls from the Palestinian and Arab organizations have been prompted by concerns about the war's impact on Palestinian athletes and sports facilities.

In February, twenty-six French lawmakers sent a letter to the IOC, urging sanctions against Israel, and calling for a ban on Israeli athletes competing under their flag and anthem. The lawmakers cited Israel's alleged war crimes in the Gaza Strip as the reason for their stance. They proposed that Israeli athletes participate neutrally, similar to Russian and Belarusian athletes, during the Games. The American-based global organization Avaaz started an online appeal calling on IOC to ban Israel from the Games until it "ceases its assault on innocent civilians in Gaza."

Thomas Portes, a lawmaker from La France Insoumise party, was captured on video saying that Israel's Olympic athletes "were not welcome in France" and called for protests against their participation in the Olympic games. On 23 July 2024, protests were held in Paris by pro-Palestinian demonstrators urging the IOC to have Israel excluded from the Games.

=== Withdrawals ===
The IOC has cautioned athletes against boycotting or discriminating against others, stating that immediate action will follow any discriminatory behavior such as the case of Algerian judoka Fethi Nourine, who received a ten year ban following his refusal to fight Tohar Butbul, an Israeli, in the 2020 Summer Olympics. The IOC also stated that athletes are not to be held accountable for their government's actions. However, Algerian judoka Messaoud Dris, who was previously reported to consider withdrawing, was disqualified ahead of a match against Butbul in the −73 kg event, after his weight was measured to be 0.4 kg above the limit. Jibril Rajoub, the president of the Palestine Olympic Committee, said he would refuse to engage with his Israeli counterpart Yael Arad, commenting: "The Palestinian athletes and I will follow the principles of the IOC. And if we feel that there is any violation from our side, we have to fight against it. The ball is in the other side's court." He further referenced Israeli judoka and flagbearer Peter Paltchik, accused of posting on his social media images of Israeli missiles captioned "From me to you with pleasure".

=== Double standard accusations against the IOC ===
In November 2023, Russia accused the IOC of having double standards by not sanctioning Israel due to its military actions in Gaza, as Palestine is also an IOC member. The IOC's response to the comparisons to Russia was that the recommendations adopted on Russia and Belarus resulted from the violation of the Olympic Truce that was in force at the time, Russia's violation of the Olympic Charter following their annexation of four Ukrainian Olympic councils, and Russia's two previous violations in 2008 and 2014. American academic and former professional soccer player Jules Boykoff described the double standards as "glaring" and questioned the IOC's treatment of Israel compared to Russia, stating that Israel's various settlements in the West Bank, East Jerusalem, and the Golan Heights are in violation of the Olympic Charter the same way the Russian invasion of Ukraine is. However, French president Emmanuel Macron defended the decision to include Israel, stating that "Israel responded to a terrorist attack" by Hamas, and that "this is not a war of aggression".

=== During the Games ===
During the national anthem, Israel's team faced heckling in stadiums, and athletes were escorted to events by a strong police presence, including riot police vans. In the football game against Mali, Palestinian flags were displayed by a few spectators, with some parts of the crowd booing the Israelis and sporadic chants of "free Palestine" that drew attention from security, while outside the venue came choruses of "free the hostages".

== See also ==
- Israel at the Olympics
- Israel at the 2024 Summer Paralympics
