= Robin Muhr =

Israeli equestrian

Robin Muhr רובין מוהר
Personal information
- Full name: Robin Muhr
- Nationality: Israeli, French
- Born: 21 June 1995 (age 30) Monaco City, Monaco

Sport
- Country: Israel
- Sport: Equestrian

Robin Muhr (Hebrew: רובין מוהר; born 21 June 1995 in Monaco City) is a Monaco-born Israeli Olympic equestrian. He represented Israel at the 2024 Paris Olympics in individual jumping and team jumping.

== Early life ==
His father Eric has competed in equestrian jumping at the elite level. His sister Tressy represented Israel in equestrian jumping at the 2018 European Young Riders Championships that were held in Fontainebleu, France. One of his grandmothers was born in what is now Israel.

== Career ==
Muhr began riding at 10 years of age.

Muhr competed at the 2022 FEI World Championships in Herning, Denmark, coming in 45th in the individual and 15th in the team event. He also competed in the 2021 and 2023 European Championships.

In September 2022 he won the St Tropez-Grimaud CSI5* Table A. In November 2022 he won the Verona CSI5*-W Table A. In September 2023 he won the Rome Circo Massimo CSI5* GCT/GCL Table A.

=== 2024-present; Paris Olympics ===
Muhr represented Israel at the 2024 Paris Olympics at the Palace of Versailles in individual jumping and team jumping, with his horse Galaxy HM. He finished 9th with the Israeli team, and 42nd in the individual competition.
