= Riyadh International Convention and Exhibition Center =

Convention center in Riyadh, Saudi Arabia

Riyadh International Convention and Exhibition Center مركز الرياض الدولي للمؤتمرات والمعارض
- The exhibition center in May 2022
- Interactive map of Riyadh International Convention and Exhibition Center مركز الرياض الدولي للمؤتمرات والمعارض
- Location: Riyadh, Saudi Arabia
- Coordinates: 24°45′04.6″N 46°43′33.7″E

Construction
- Opened: March 2009

Website
- Official website

The Riyadh International Convention and Exhibition Center (Arabic: مركز الرياض الدولي للمؤتمرات والمعارض) is a convention center in Riyadh, Saudi Arabia.

== History ==
The convention center was opened in March 2009. During the COVID-19 pandemic, the center is turned into the vaccination center.
