= Harrie Smolders =

Dutch show jumping rider

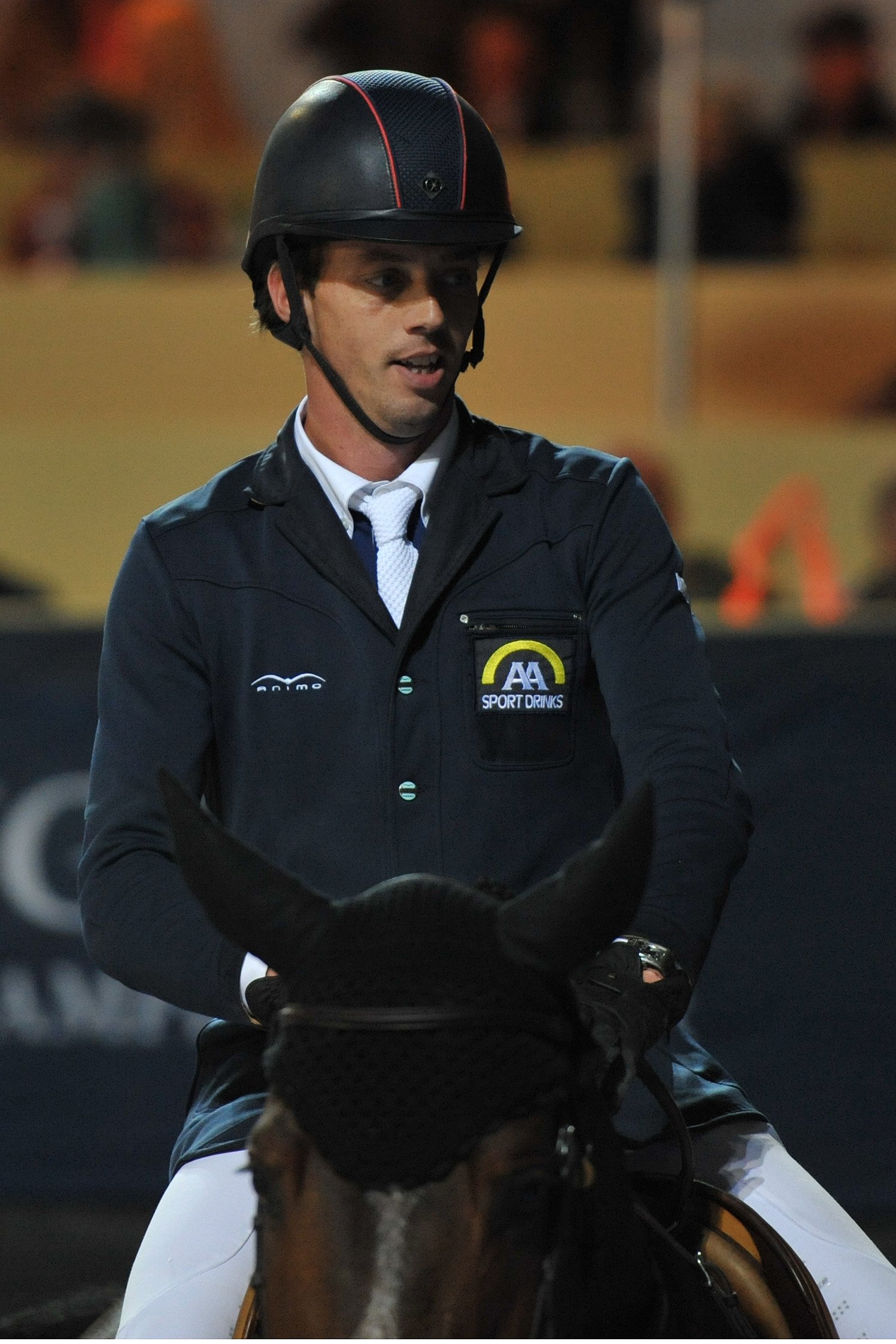
- Smolders in 2018

Personal information
- Discipline: Show jumping
- Born: 10 May 1980 (age 46); Lage Mierde, Reusel-De Mierden, North Brabant, Netherlands
- Height: 1.83 m (6 ft 0 in)
Medal record
Equestrian
Representing the Netherlands
World Championships
Silver medal – second place	2022 Herning	Team jumping
European Championships
Silver medal – second place	2017 Gothenburg	Individual jumping
World Cup
Silver medal – second place	2016 Gothenburg	Individual jumping
Silver medal – second place	2022 Leipzig	Individual jumping
Silver medal – second place	2023 Omaha	Individual jumping

Harrie Smolders (born 10 May 1980) is a Dutch Olympic show jumping rider. He competed at the 2016 Summer Olympics in Rio de Janeiro, Brazil, where he placed 7th in the team and 27th in the individual competition.

Smolders participated at the 2010 World Equestrian Games and at the 2009 European Championships. He finished 4th in the team jumping event at the 2009 Europeans held at Windsor Castle. Smolders also participated at four editions of the Show Jumping World Cup finals (in 2008, 2011, 2012 and 2016), with his best result coming in 2016 when he finished 2nd. He won the Global Champions Tour 2017, becoming CHAMPION OF THE CHAMPIONS with still one show to come, first in history. Sponsored by Copernicus, Vestrum, Parlanti and CWD.

In 2018 Harrie Smolders secured the number one spot of the Longines World Ranking for the first time in his career. This position was previously held by the Olympic silver medalist Kent Farrington.
