= Van Gestel =

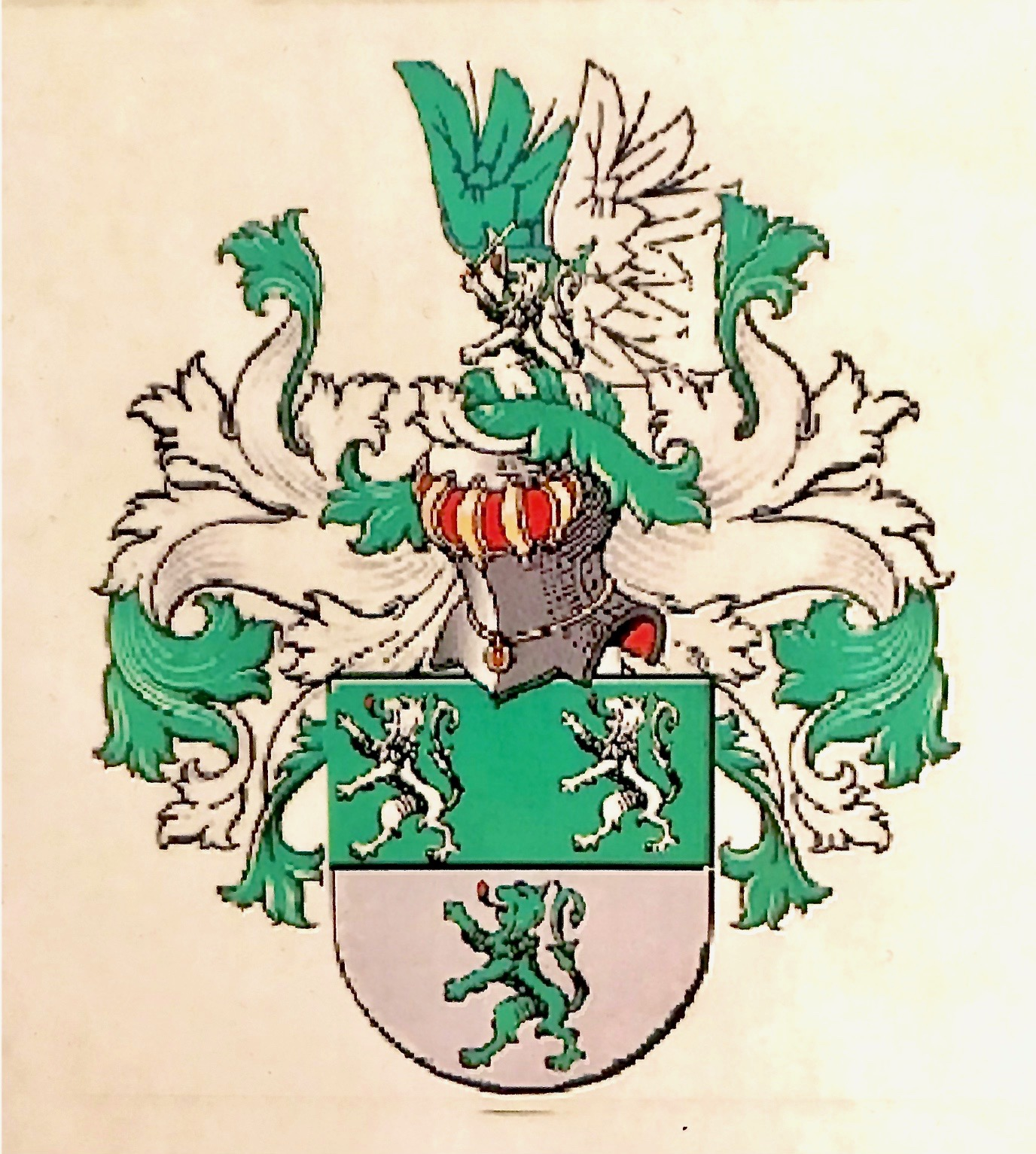
Arms of 'Van Gestel'

Van Gestel (also: Van Ghestel) is a Dutch toponymic surname or family name originating from North Brabant. The first use of the name stems from the 11th and 12th century, with the first recorded coat of arms dating to 1308. It is derived from the word "Gestel" and translates to "from Gestel". "Gestel" or "Ghestele" was a name for a higher area between two river valleys, and is a common name or suffix for settlements in the Southern Netherlands. Gestel can refer to several geographical locations:

Netherlands

- Gestel (Eindhoven)
- Moergestel, village (Gestel) bordering a swamp (moeras)
- Sint-Michielsgestel, named Gestel before 1629
- Luyksgestel, village (Gestel) in former prinsbisdom Luik
- Oud Gastel, named Gestele before 1275
- Gastel, variation on Gestel

Belgium

- Gestel (Berlaar), as well as the 14th century Gestelhof castle
- Gestel (Meerhout)
- Gestel (Lummen)
- Gestel (Meeuwen)
- Gistel, named Ghistele of Ghestele originally

France

- Gestel (Morbihan), municipality in Bretagne

Notable people with this surname include:

Van Gestel

- Celine Van Gestel (born 1997), Belgian volleyball player
- Dries Van Gestel (born 1994), Belgian racing cyclist
- Gerrit Van Gestel (born 1958), Belgian racing cyclist
- Harry van Gestel (born 1953), Dutch artist and painter
- Peter van Gestel (1937–2019), Dutch writer of young adult fiction
- Sophie van Gestel (born 1991), Dutch beach volleyball player
- Tiest van Gestel (1881–1969), Dutch archer

Variants

Variant spellings of Gestel include Ghestel, Ghesel, Gastel, Gessel, Ghestele, Gheest, Gistel and Gaast. People with this name include:

- Jean-Paul van Gastel (born 1972), Dutch football midfielder
- Jo van Gastel (1887–1969), Dutch archer
- Sander van Gessel (born 1976), Dutch football defender
