= Hooge Mierde =

- Village
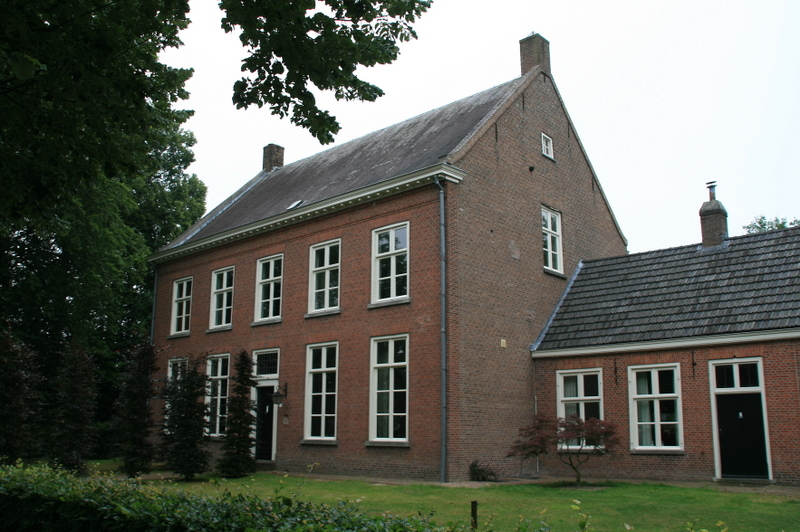
- Clergy house

- Location in the province of North Brabant in the Netherlands Hooge Mierde (Netherlands)
- Coordinates: 51°23′15″N 5°07′47″E
- Country: Netherlands
- Province: North Brabant
- Municipality: Reusel-De Mierden

Area
  - Total: 21.11 km^{2} (8.15 sq mi)
- Elevation: 33 m (108 ft)

Population (2021)
  - Total: 1,810
  - Density: 85.7/km^{2} (222/sq mi)
- Time zone: UTC+1 (CET)
  - Summer (DST): UTC+2 (CEST)
- Postal code: 5095
- Dialing code: 013

Hooge Mierde is a village in the municipality of Reusel-De Mierden in the province of North Brabant, the Netherlands. It was formerly part of Hooge en Lage Mierde municipality, and since 1997 it has become part of Reusel-De Mierden.

The village was first mentioned around 1200 as Myrtha, and means "settlement near the swamp". Hooge (high) has been added to distinguish from Lage Mierde. Hooge Mierden is an agricultural village which developed in the Middle Ages on the Campine sand grounds. The Catholic St.-Jan Evangelist Church was built between 1922 and 1923 in expressionist style. The tower from the 15th century remained.

Hooge Mierde was home to 121 people in 1840. It was part of the municipality of Hooge en Lage Mierde until 1997, when it was merged into Reusel-De Mierden.

== Notable people ==
- Imke Schellekens-Bartels (1977) - Equestrian
