= 2023 FEI World Cup Finals (show jumping and dressage) =

Dressage event

- Host city: Omaha, Nebraska, United States
- Date(s): April 4 – 8, 2023
- Main stadium: CHI Health Center Omaha
- Level: Senior
- Type: Indoor
- Events: 3

The 2023 FEI World Cup Finals for dressage, show jumping and Vaulting are scheduled to be held April 4–8, 2023 in Omaha, Nebraska, United States. The event is set to be held in the CHI Health Center Omaha and will mark the conclusion of the 2022–23 Dressage, Show jumping and Vaulting World Cup Seasons.

== Overview ==
The 36th edition of the FEI World Cup Finals was back in Omaha, Nebraska after they hosted the finals in 2017. In Dressage, normally 18 riders qualify for the Finals but some riders troubled with making the trip to the US. Initially, Charlotte Phillips of Australia won the Pacific League qualifier and qualified for the Finals, but due the mandatory vaccinations against Equine Influenza, she was not able to travel because her horse CP Dresden was not vaccinated. Neither the second placed rider Kerry Mack was able to travel because her horse was also not vaccinated and claimed the Australian federation did not notify them about the mandatory vaccination. Instead, European-based Simone Pearce stepped in as Australian representative. Moldovan Alisa Glinka could also not travel to Omaha because of Visa issues and had to withdraw last minute. Glinka has both the Moldovan and Russian nationally and had to go to the U.S. Embassy in Chisinau, but because of the bureaucratic process, she could not get her Visa on time. In total this reduced the number of entries to 16 instead of 18.

During the competition, Dutch Dinja van Liere had to withdraw right before the start of the Grand Prix after passing the Vet-Check the day before. Hermes was not fit to compete. Also, both German Ingrid Klimke and Dutch Marieke van der Putten had to withdraw before the start of the Grand Prix Freestyle after completing the Grand Prix. As the riders stated: "The welfare of the horses is always priority number one."

== Winners ==
=== Dressage Grand Prix ===
Rank	Rider	Horse	GPF score	Notes
1st place, gold medalist(s)	(Germany) Jessica von Bredow-Werndl	TSF Dalera	79.922 %	
2nd place, silver medalist(s)	(Germany) Isabell Werth	DSP Quantaz	77.485 %	
3rd place, bronze medalist(s)	(Denmark) Nanna Skodborg Merrald	Blue Hors Zepter	76.165 %	

=== Dressage Grand Prix Freestyle ===
Rank	Rider	Horse	GPF score	Notes
1st place, gold medalist(s)	(Germany) Jessica von Bredow-Werndl	TSF Dalera	90.482%	
2nd place, silver medalist(s)	(Denmark) Nanna Skodborg Merrald	Blue Hors Zepter	87.146%	
3rd place, bronze medalist(s)	(Germany) Isabell Werth	DSP Quantaz	85.761%	

=== Show jumping Overall ranking ===
Rank	Rider	Nation
1st place, gold medalist(s)	Henrik von Eckermann	Sweden
2nd place, silver medalist(s)	Harrie Smolders	Netherlands
3rd place, bronze medalist(s)	Hunter Holloway	United States
