= Reusel-De Mierden =

- Municipality
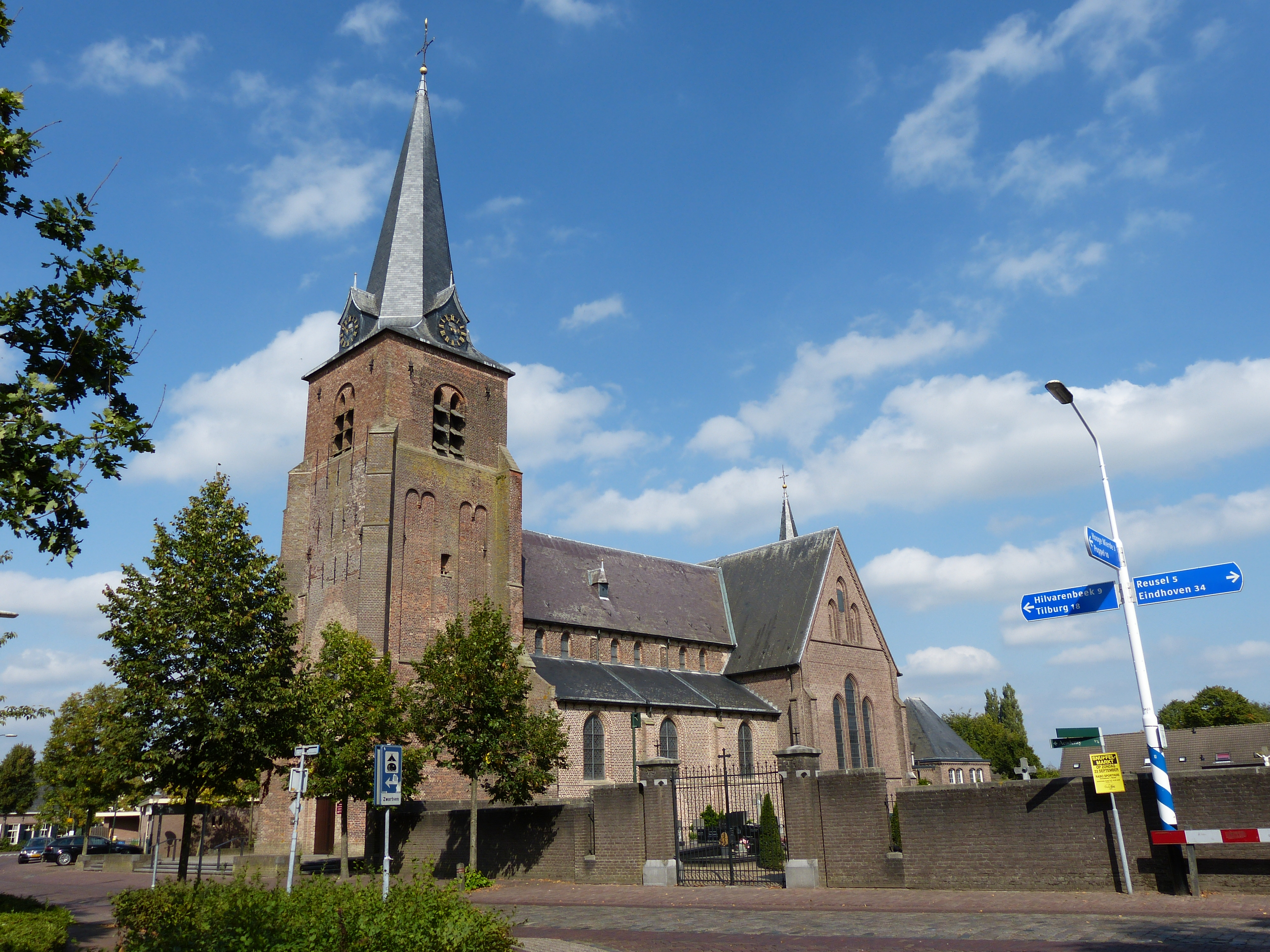
- Church in Lage Mierde

- Flag Coat of arms

- Location in North Brabant
- Coordinates: 51°22′N 5°10′E
- Country: Netherlands
- Province: North Brabant
- Established: 1 January 1997

Government
  - Body: Municipal council
  - Mayor: Jetty Eugster-van Bergeijk (acting) (CDA)

Area
  - Total: 78.66 km^{2} (30.37 sq mi)
  - Land: 77.88 km^{2} (30.07 sq mi)
  - Water: 0.78 km^{2} (0.30 sq mi)
- Elevation: 32 m (105 ft)

Population (January 2021)
  - Total: 13,127
  - Density: 169/km^{2} (440/sq mi)
- Time zone: UTC+1 (CET)
  - Summer (DST): UTC+2 (CEST)
- Postcode: 5094–5096, 5540–5541
- Area code: 013, 0497
- Website: www.reuseldemierden.nl

Reusel-De Mierden (Dutch pronunciation: [ˈrøːzəl də ˈmiːrdə(n)]) is a municipality in the southern Netherlands. It is located in the North Brabant province, and has an area of 78.66 km^{2} (30.37 sq mi). It had a population of 13,127 in 2021.

== Population centres ==
- Hooge Mierde
- Hulsel
- Lage Mierde
- Reusel

=== Topography ===
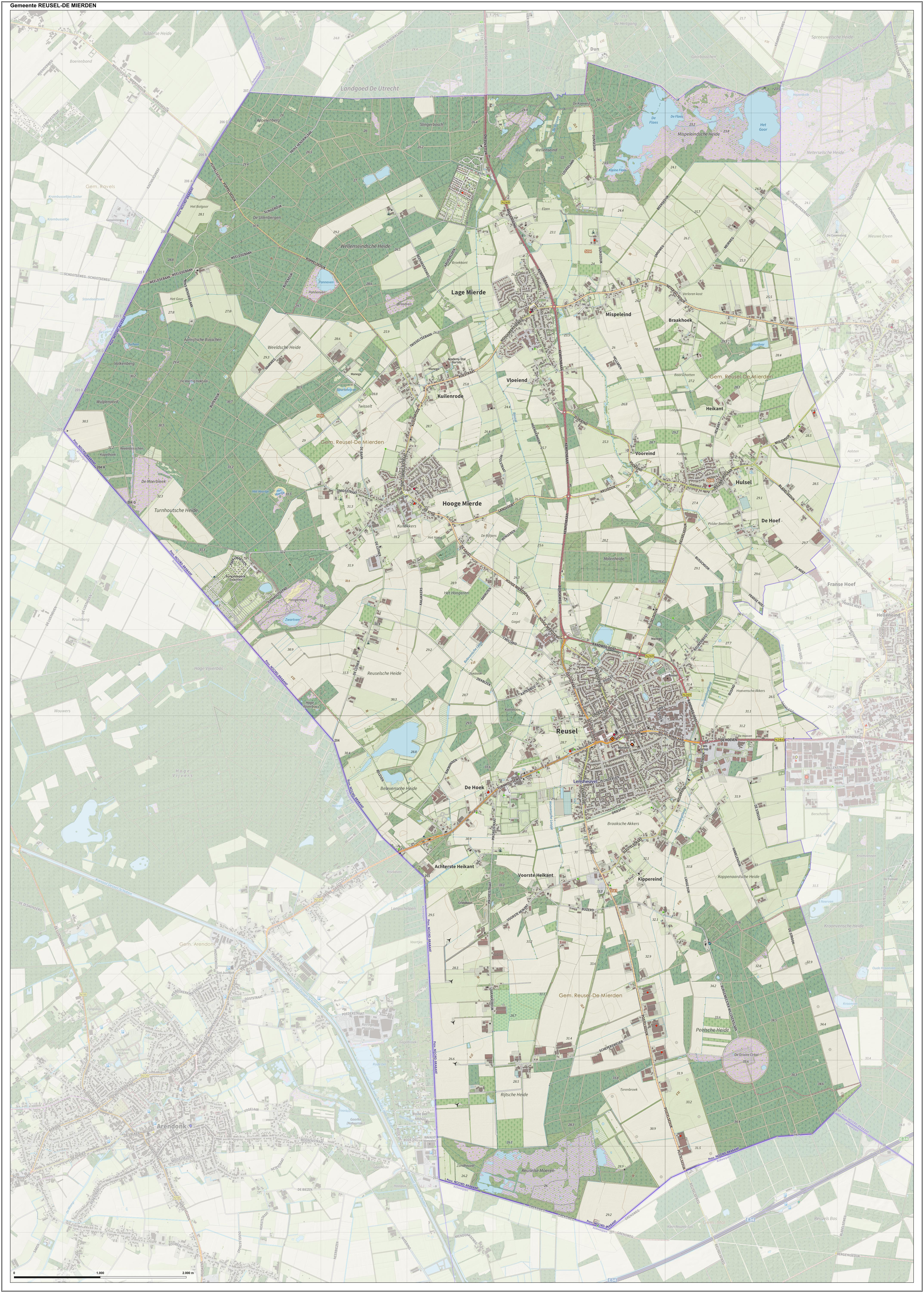

Dutch Topographic map of the municipality of Reusel-De Mierden, June 2015

== Genealogy ==
Reusel-De Mierden erroneously appears in more than a million family trees as a place of origin or residence. This is due to a software error that changed "Holland" to "Reusel-De Mierden, Noord-Brabant, Netherlands."

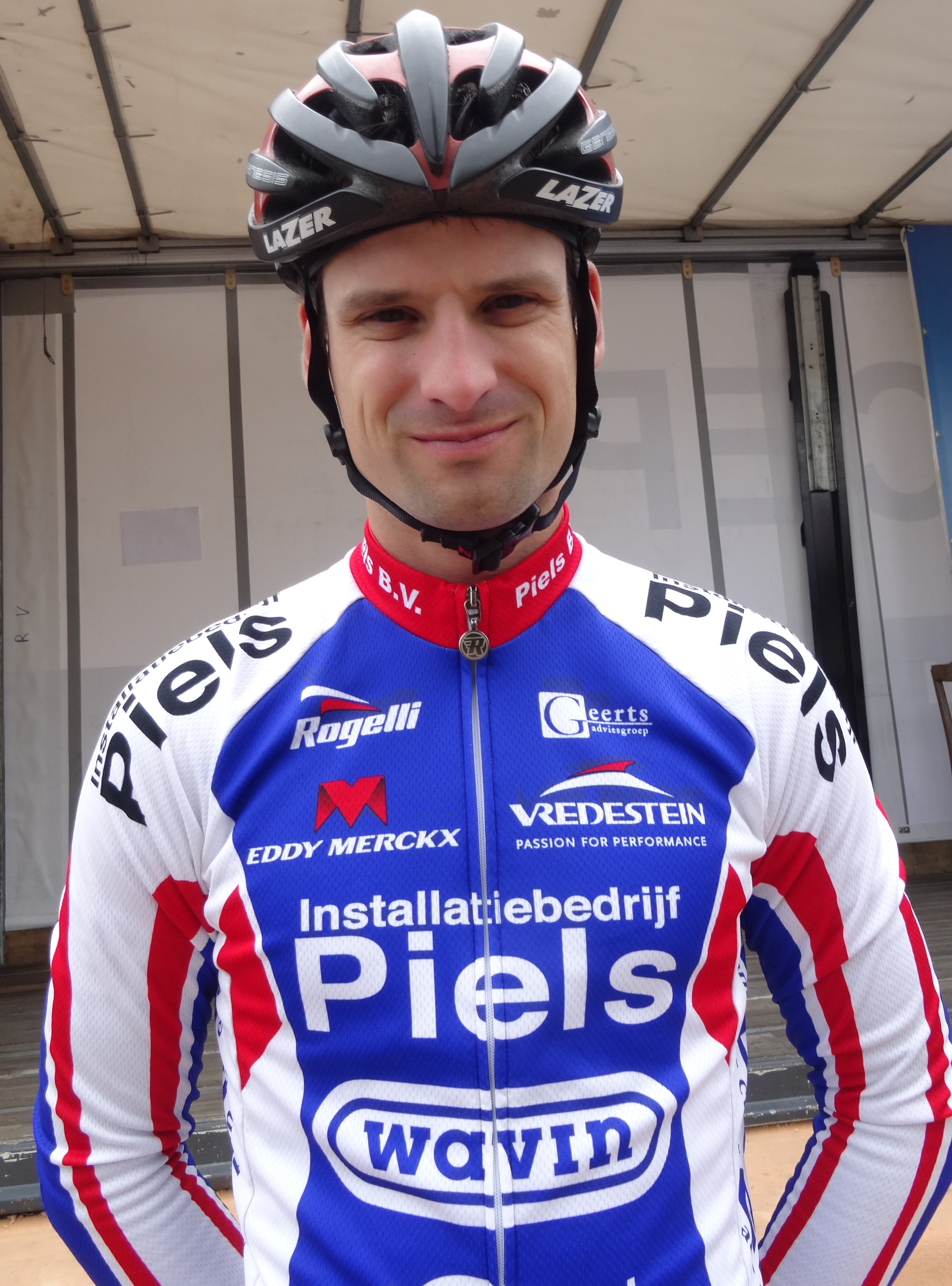
Geert van der Weijst, 2014

== Notable people ==
- Steven Mierdman (ca.1510 in Hooge Mierde – 1559) a Dutch printer of Reformation books
- Harry van Gestel (born 1953 in Reusel) a Dutch artist and painter
- Geert van der Weijst (born 1990 in Reusel) a former Dutch cyclist

== See also ==
- Hooge en Lage Mierde

== Gallery ==
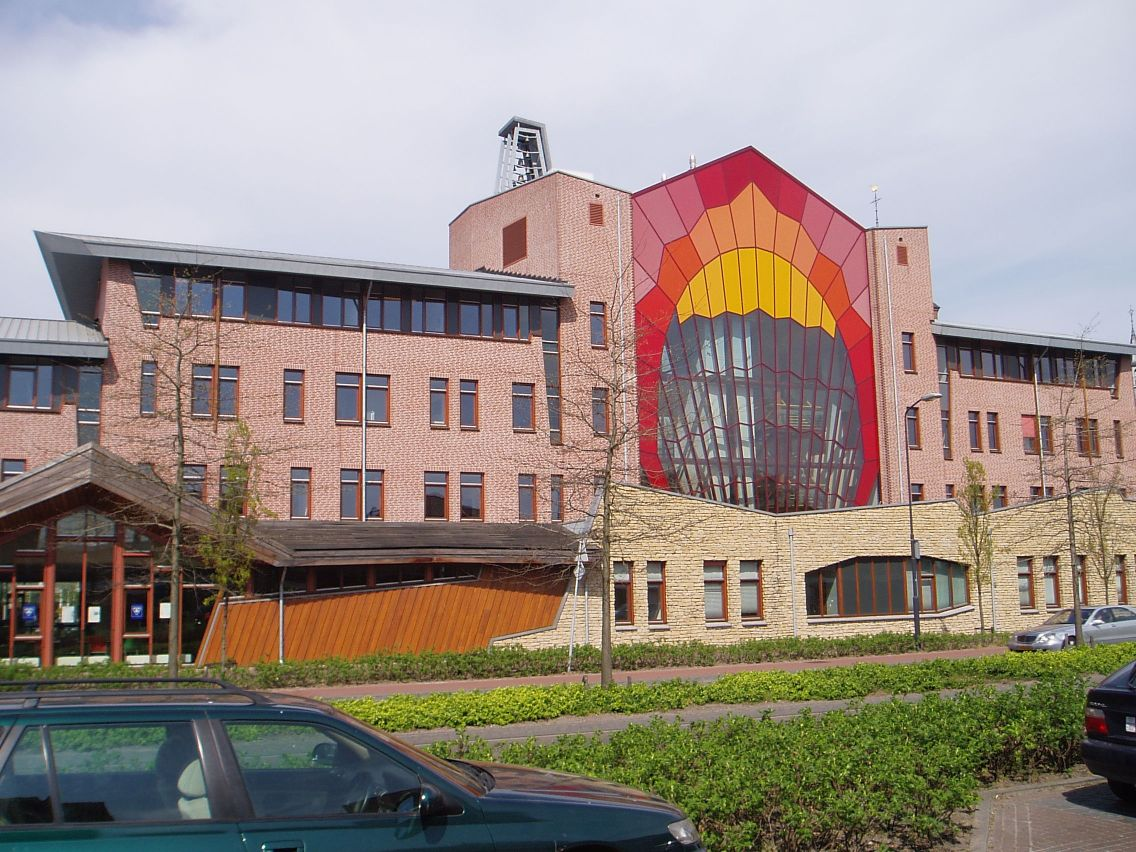
Town hall of Reusel, De Mierden

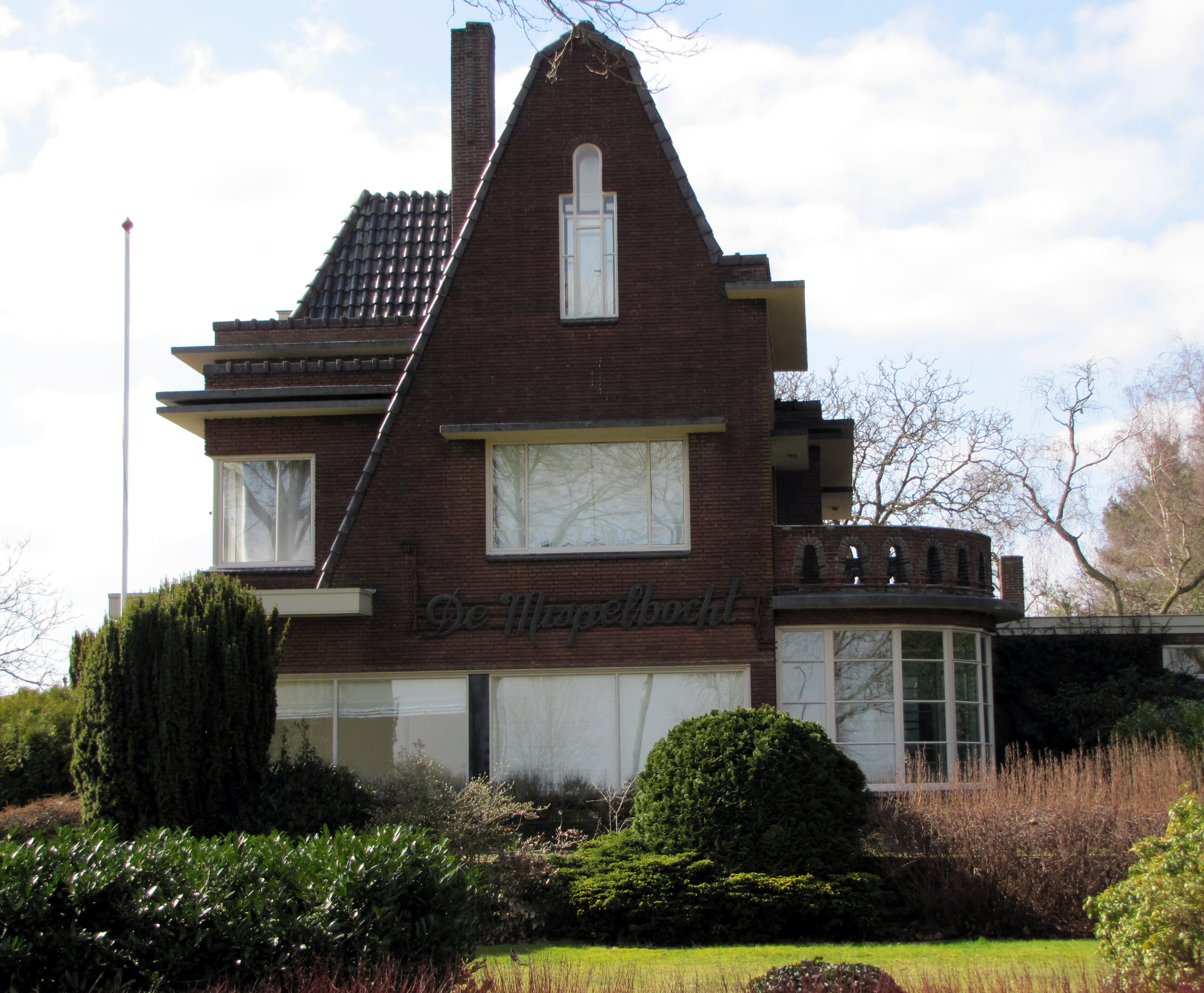
Lage Mierde De Mispelbocht

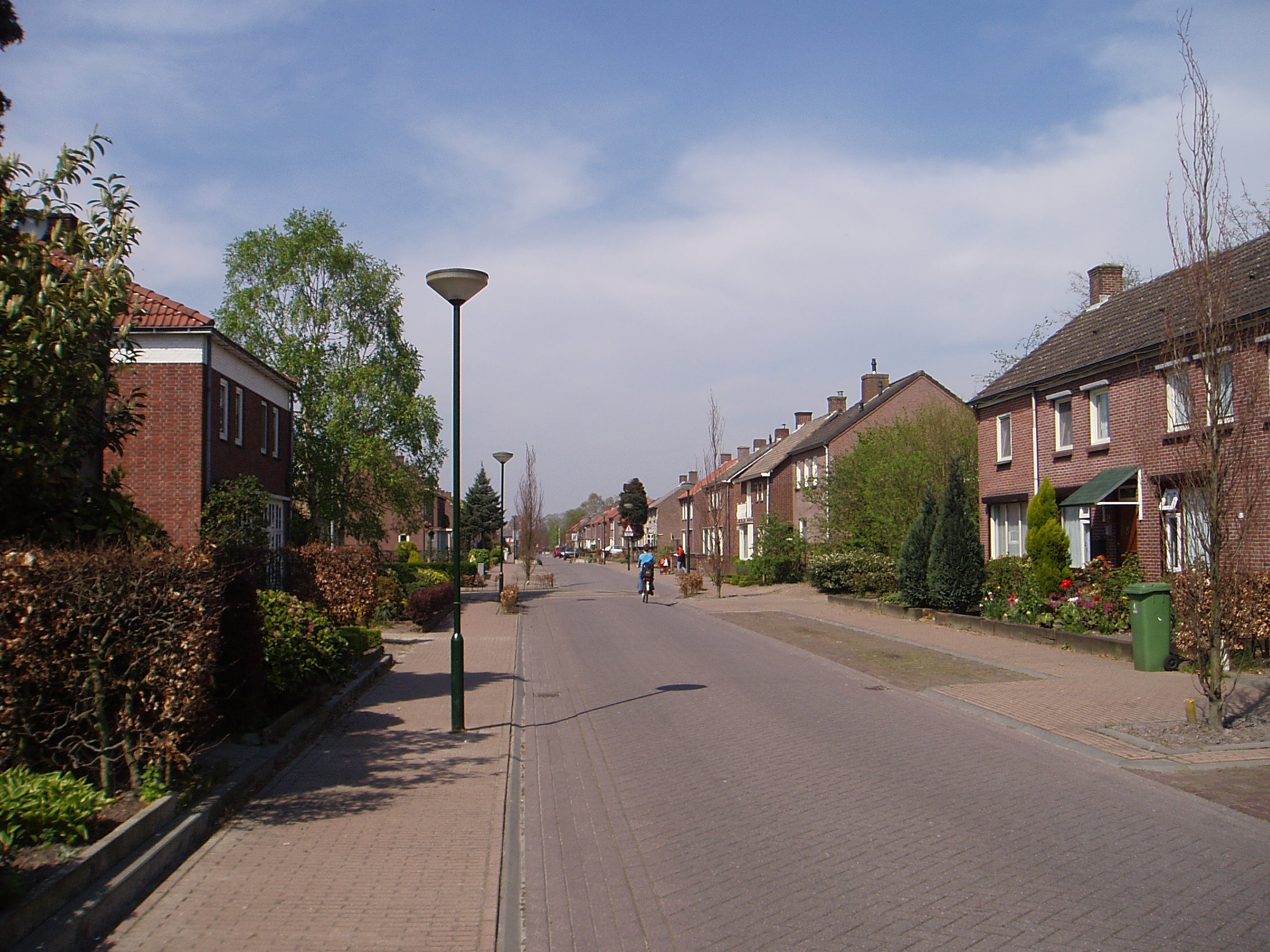
Reusel-Beukenlaan

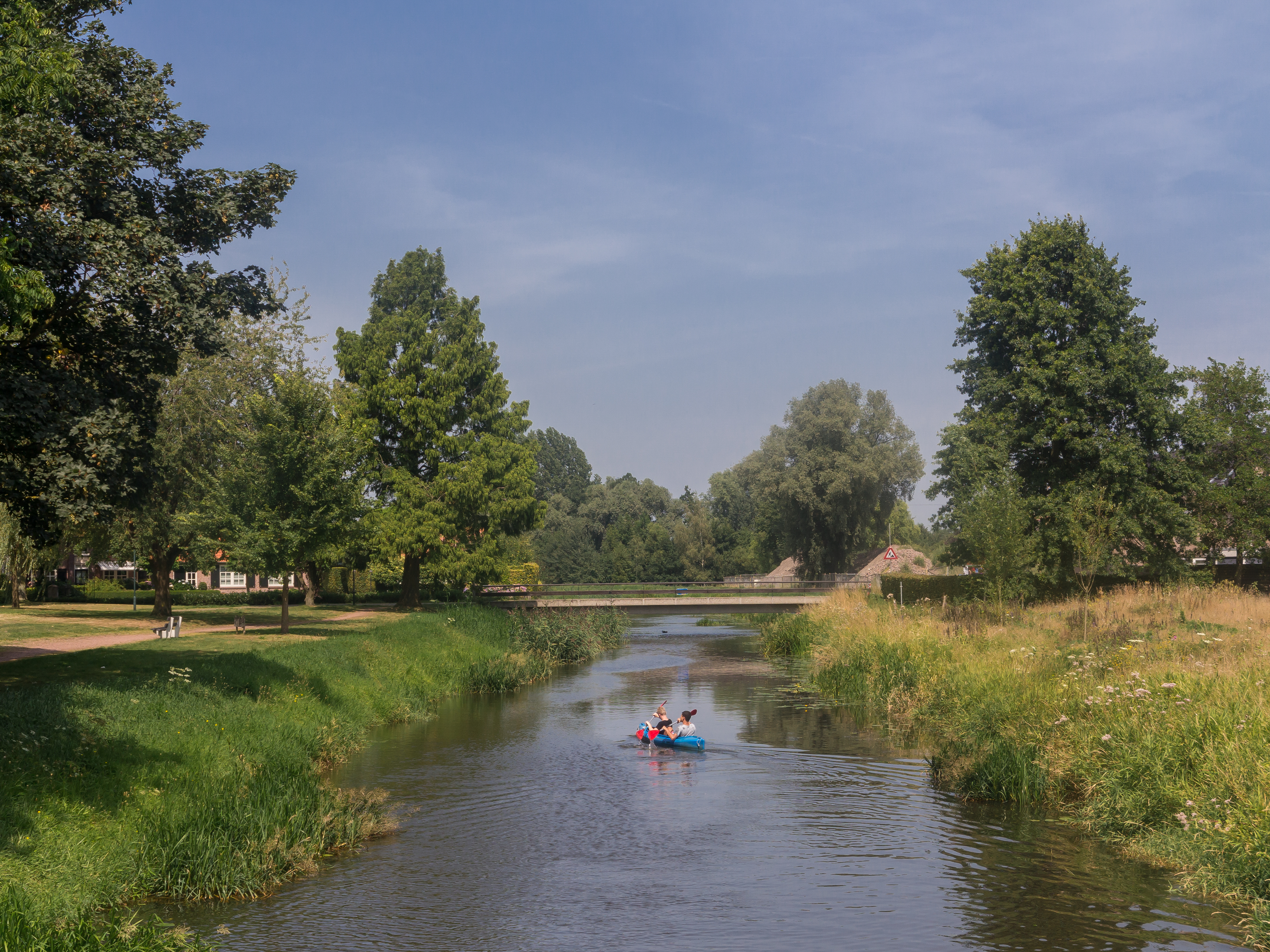
near Moergestel, brook: de Reusel
