= Harry van Gestel =

Dutch artist and painter

- Born: 12 May 1953 (age 72); Reusel, Netherlands
- Education: Autodidact
- Known for: Painting
- Website: www.harryvangestel.com

Harry van Gestel (born 12 May 1953) is a Dutch artist and painter living and working in Amsterdam, Netherlands, in his gallery and studio in the city centre. The artist is most known for his large abstract works, which range in size from 2 x 2 metres to 3 x 6 metres. He has lived and created his work around the globe, in places such as Taiwan, Europe, the United States, and South America, before returning to Amsterdam.

== His Life Journey ==
Harry van Gestel was born in Reusel. He majored his studies in botany and from there pursued creative interests. From the 1980s to the 1990s, he focused on design and decorating projects for companies and shopping malls throughout the Netherlands and The United States. In the late 1980s he moved to New York City.

== Works ==
Van Gestel's works are diverse and cannot be placed in just one -ism. In 2006 Sotheby's Amsterdam organised an exhibition giving a complete overview of his oeuvre and stated: “His oeuvre is vast and significant…….Harry van Gestel is beyond any -ism” (Mr. Max Hemelraad, art historian and former Business Development Director at Sotheby's). The artist describes his works as self-portraits in the sense that the artwork reveals a mirror image of the soul, energy and emotion of the artist at the moment of creation.

None of the artist's works have a title. Van Gestel states that a title for his works, that portray emotion through pureness of soul, does not add anything to the artwork and so only takes away all essential emotional value from the imagination of the spectator.

== Shows ==
In 1981 Harry van Gestel started working on international shows. Throughout the following years, his works were shown in the Netherlands, Mexico, Bahamas, Colombia and the United States. Afterward, in 1984, he worked on projects in Switzerland. Between 1990 and 1993 he traveled throughout the United States working on a range of art workshops.

In 1992 Van Gestel received a solo show at Gallery Marie Louise Woltering in the Spiegelkwartier in Amsterdam. Between 1995 and 1997 he worked, lived and realized multiple shows in Paris, New York City, Altea, and Mauritius. Since 1998 Van Gestel has had a permanent exhibition in the centre of Amsterdam. In 2006 Sotheby's Amsterdam featured a solo exhibition, a retrospective overview of his oeuvre. In 2007 The Nagasaki Museum of History and Culture in Japan hosted an exhibition of the works of 5 prominent Dutch artists, including the works of Harry van Gestel. In 2009 Harry exhibited a range of works and held a presentation in the International Museum of Contemporary Art in Vinhedo, Brazil.

== Collections ==
His work has been collected by art collectors, curators, and investors from all over the world. It can be found in private collections from Chile, Argentina, Brazil, United States, Canada, Japan, China, Australia, Russia, the Middle East, and throughout Europe.

== Auctions ==
From around the start of the millennium, the works of Harry van Gestel have been auctioned by Sotheby's Amsterdam multiple times. In 2006 Sotheby's organized a solo exhibition of the works of Harry van Gestel at their location in the centre of Amsterdam.

In 1998 Harry van Gestel opened his gallery in the city centre of Amsterdam. Since 2013 the gallery has been directed by Thomas van de Meer, owner of Vault17. The artist has his studio space in the gallery. The location functions as a spot for international artists to come together and work.

== Charity ==
Harry van Gestel founded the Foundation Mercurius Communication through Art in 1998. The foundation supports charities and projects internationally through the sales of Van Gestel's work. Since 1998 the foundation has supported Het Babyhuis, Cliniclowns, breast cancer research, Bio revalidate, AIDS foundation, Kidney foundation, and primary schools in Brazil, amongst other projects.
