= Hooge en Lage Mierde =

Coordinates: 51.398563°N 5.140915°E

Coat of Arms

Hooge en Lage Mierde was a municipality in the Dutch province of North Brabant. It included the villages of Lage Mierde, Hooge Mierde, and Hulsel.

Hooge en Lage Mierde existed until 1997, when it merged with Reusel to form the new municipality of Reusel-De Mierden.
