= Reusel =

- Village
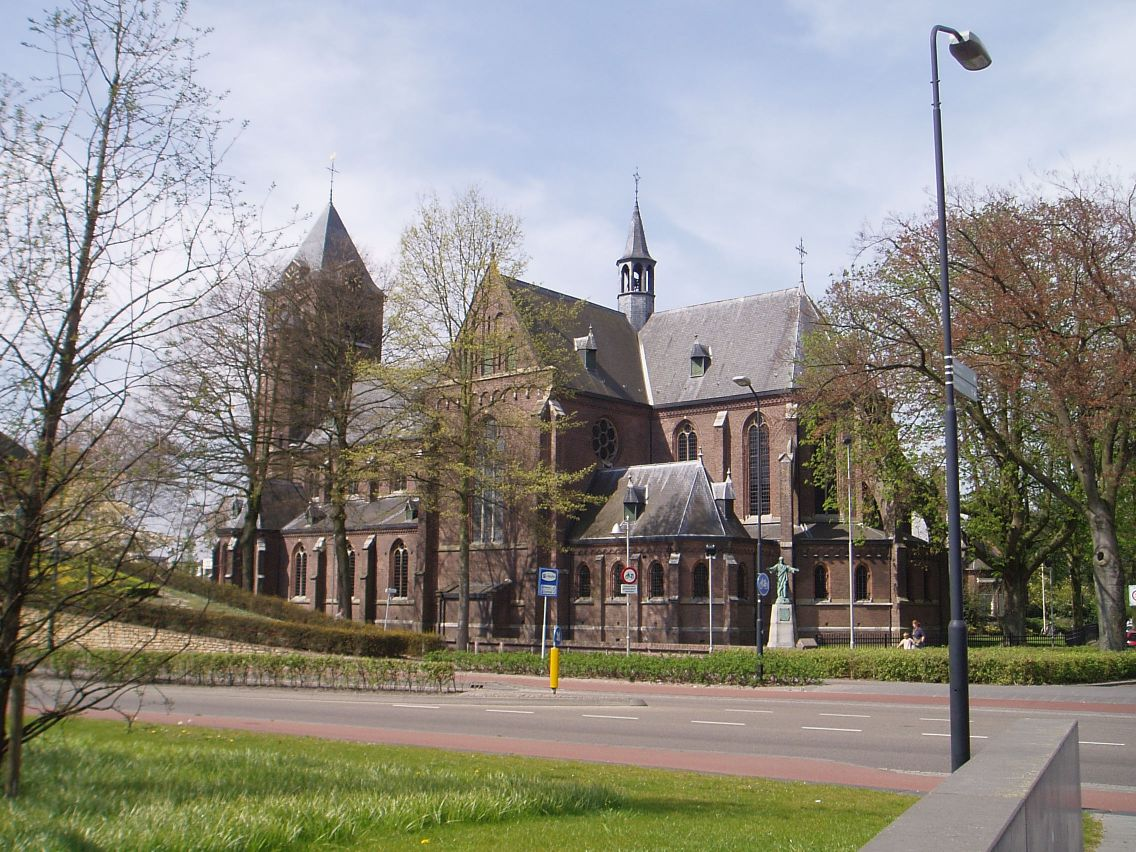
- Reusel church

- Flag Coat of arms

- Location in the province of North Brabant in the Netherlands Reusel (Netherlands)
- Coordinates: 51°21′42″N 5°9′47″E
- Country: Netherlands
- Province: North Brabant
- Municipality: Reusel-De Mierden

Area
  - Total: 26.52 km^{2} (10.24 sq mi)
- Elevation: 31 m (102 ft)

Population (2021)
  - Total: 8,005
  - Density: 301.8/km^{2} (781.8/sq mi)
- Time zone: UTC+1 (CET)
  - Summer (DST): UTC+2 (CEST)
- Postal code: 5541
- Dialing code: 0497

Reusel is a village and former municipality in the south of the Dutch province of North Brabant. It is one of the villages of the municipality Reusel-De Mierden.

The village is known on their village dialect (Reusels), which is still spoken, and for the nature area Het Goor, which is also known as the Reuselse Moeren. Also the town is known for the large number of bars and shops. And the annual town fair (Reusel Kermis) is famous in the area.

Reusel existed until 1997, when it merged with Hooge en Lage Mierde to form the new municipality of Reusel-De Mierden.

== Spurious location ==
Thousands of Dutch locations in family trees are spuriously identified as "Holland, Reusel-de Mierden, Noord-Brabant, Netherlands" despite having no connection to this small village. This is due to an error in popular genealogy software Family Tree Maker, which previously would match "Holland" to a narrow, 1.3 km road named "Het Holland" (The Woodland) located in Reusel, and automatically suggest this substitution. Long after the software error was corrected, these spurious locations have persisted in trees and have been uncritically copied.

== Gallery ==
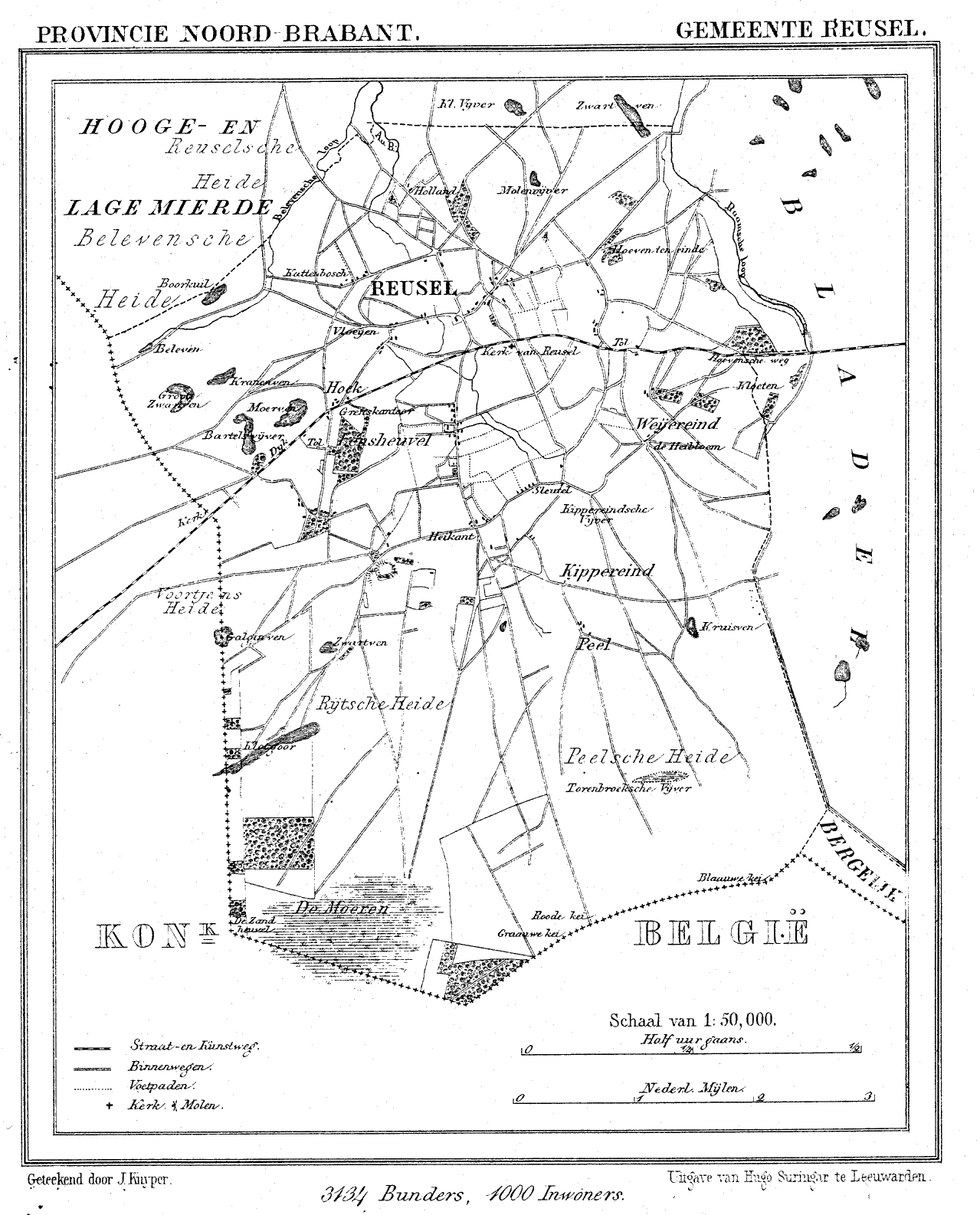
Reusel in 1867

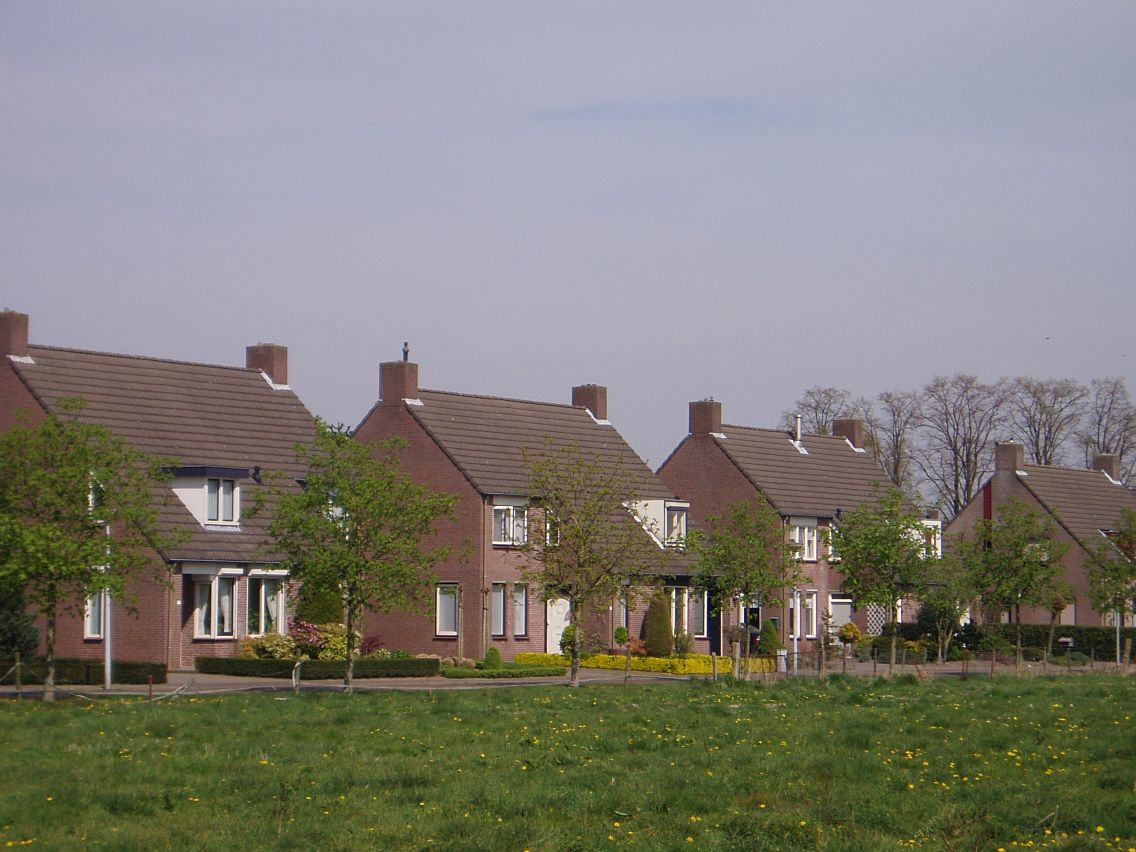

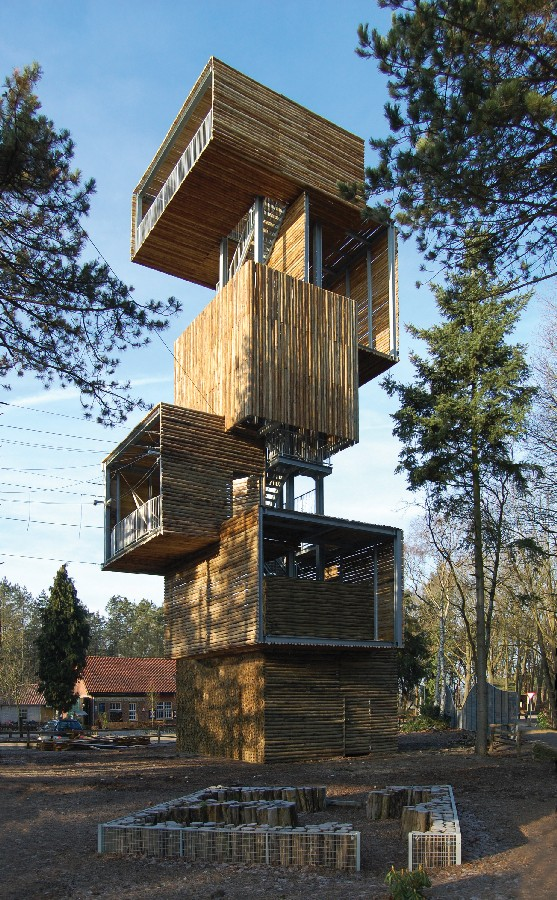
Uitkijktoren "De Nieuwe Brandtoren"
