= Indoor cross-country =

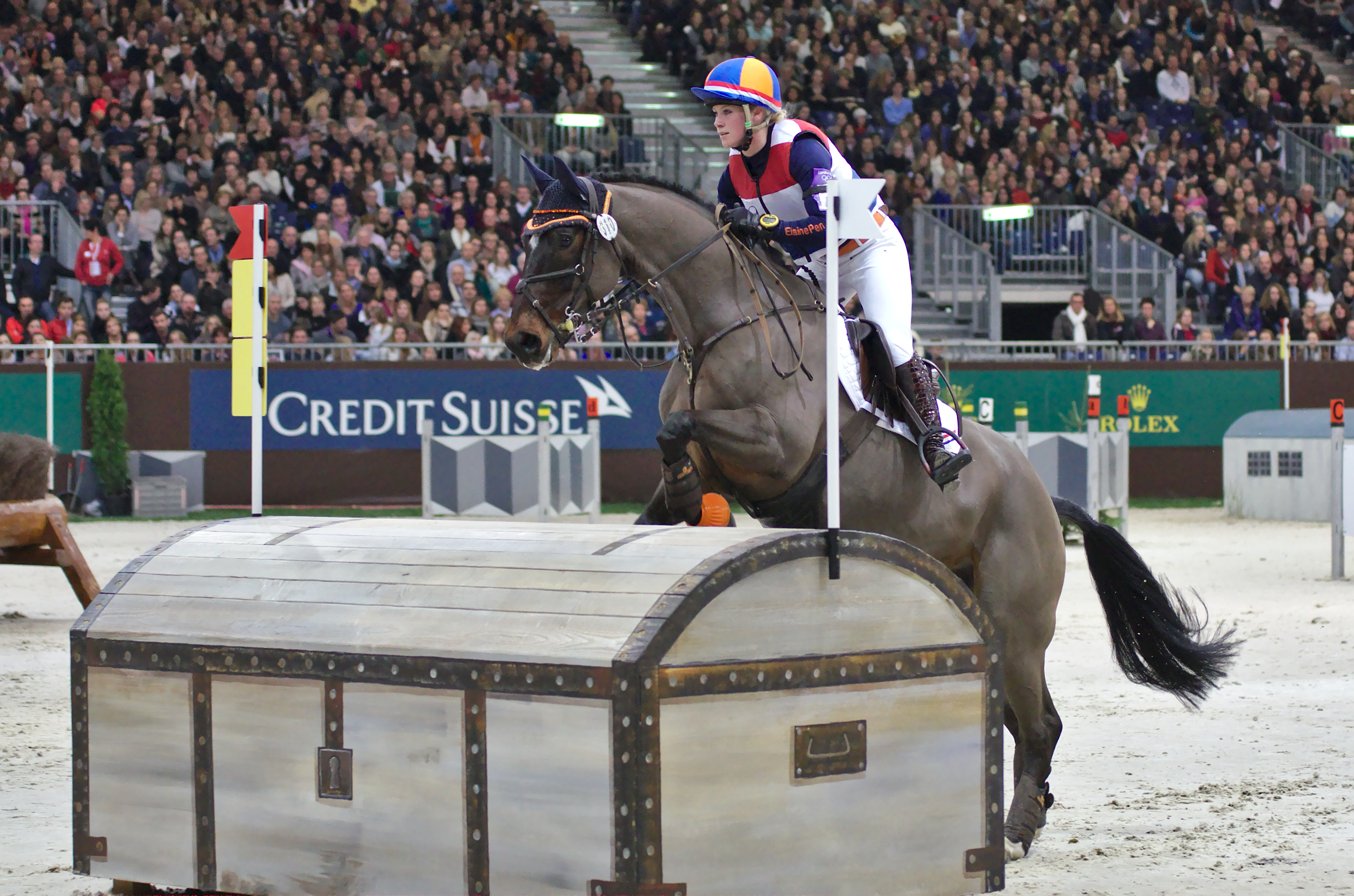
Elaine Pen and Dostowjeski at Indoor Cross Country 54eme CHI de Genève 13 December 2014

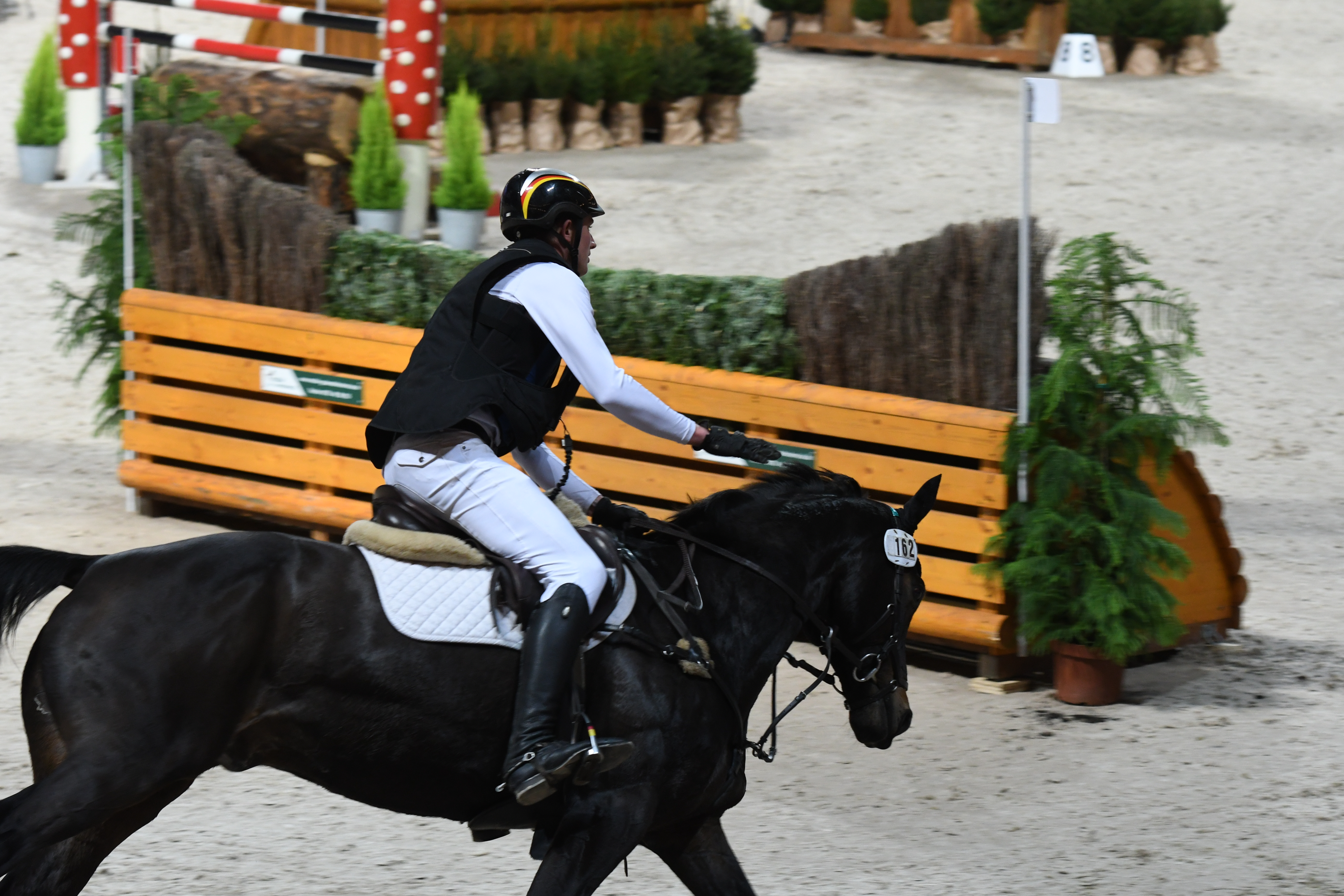
Jan Matthias and Granulin 2 during indoor cross-country during Sweden International Horse Show 29 November 2018.

Indoor cross country, also called indoor eventing, is a relatively new test of equestrian skills. It involves the use of both show jumping-type obstacles and cross country-type obstacles (including banks, water, logs, and brush fences) in a course of an indoor arena.

Indoor cross-country has mainly been performed in Europe. However, Britain offered its first competition at the British Open Show Jumping Championships in April 2006. Such was the success of this event, which included riders such as Zara Phillips and Jeanette Brakewell, that the event is now one of the main attractions at the British Open. In the Autumn of 2006, the Royal Fair in Toronto launched their version after consultation with the British Open organizers.

Rails down add penalties to the rider's score, as does going over time.
