= Cross-country riding =

Competitive horse-riding discipline

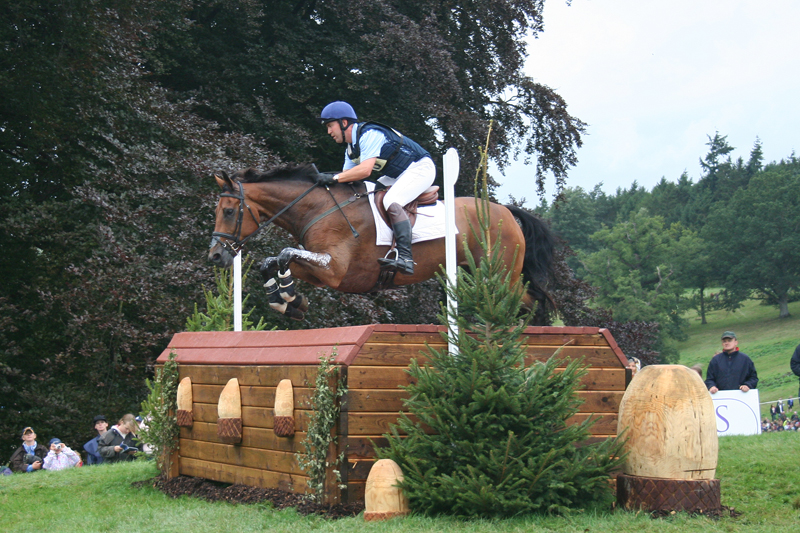
A cross country competitor

Helmet cam on a competitor riding a cross country course

Cross country equestrian jumping forms one of the three phases of the sport of eventing; it may also be a competition in its own right, known as hunter trials or simply "cross-country", although these tend to be lower-level, local competitions.

The object of cross-country is to prove the speed, endurance and jumping ability of the true cross-country horse when he is well trained and brought to the peak of condition. At the same time, it demonstrates the rider's knowledge of pace and the use of this horse across country. (While cross-country tests a horse's endurance over a short period, endurance itself is a separate sport, involving long-distance cross-country riding without jumps).

== Course ==
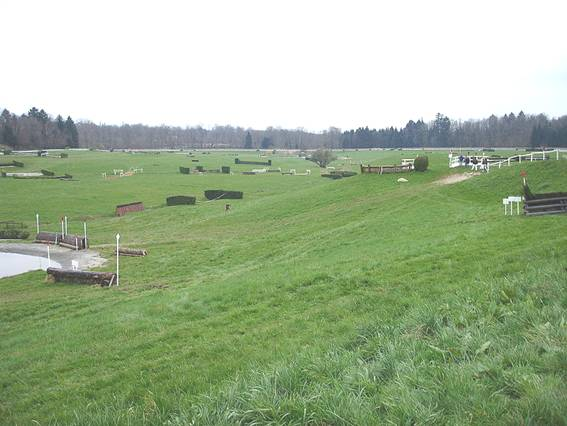
A cross-country course

=== Length and types of obstacles ===
The cross-country course is approximately two and three-quarters to four miles (4.4 to 6.4 km) long, comprising some twenty-four to thirty-six fixed and solid obstacles. Obstacles usually are built to look "natural" (out of logs, for instance), however odd materials and decorations may be added to test the horse's bravery. Obstacles can include all those that might be found if riding across the countryside, including water, trees, logs, banks, and ditches.

All obstacles or compulsory passageways are flagged, with a red flag on the right and a white flag on the left. A black stripe on the red flag indicates that it is an option for the obstacle, and another route may be taken if the rider so chooses, without penalty. All obstacles are numbered, and the color of the numbering can indicate which level the fence is for if multiple levels are competing at the event. (for example, white numbers on a green background indicate that the fence is on the Preliminary level course, however, in British eventing, this color combination would indicate the intermediate track, so riders should always check the course map for course markers).

=== Design ===
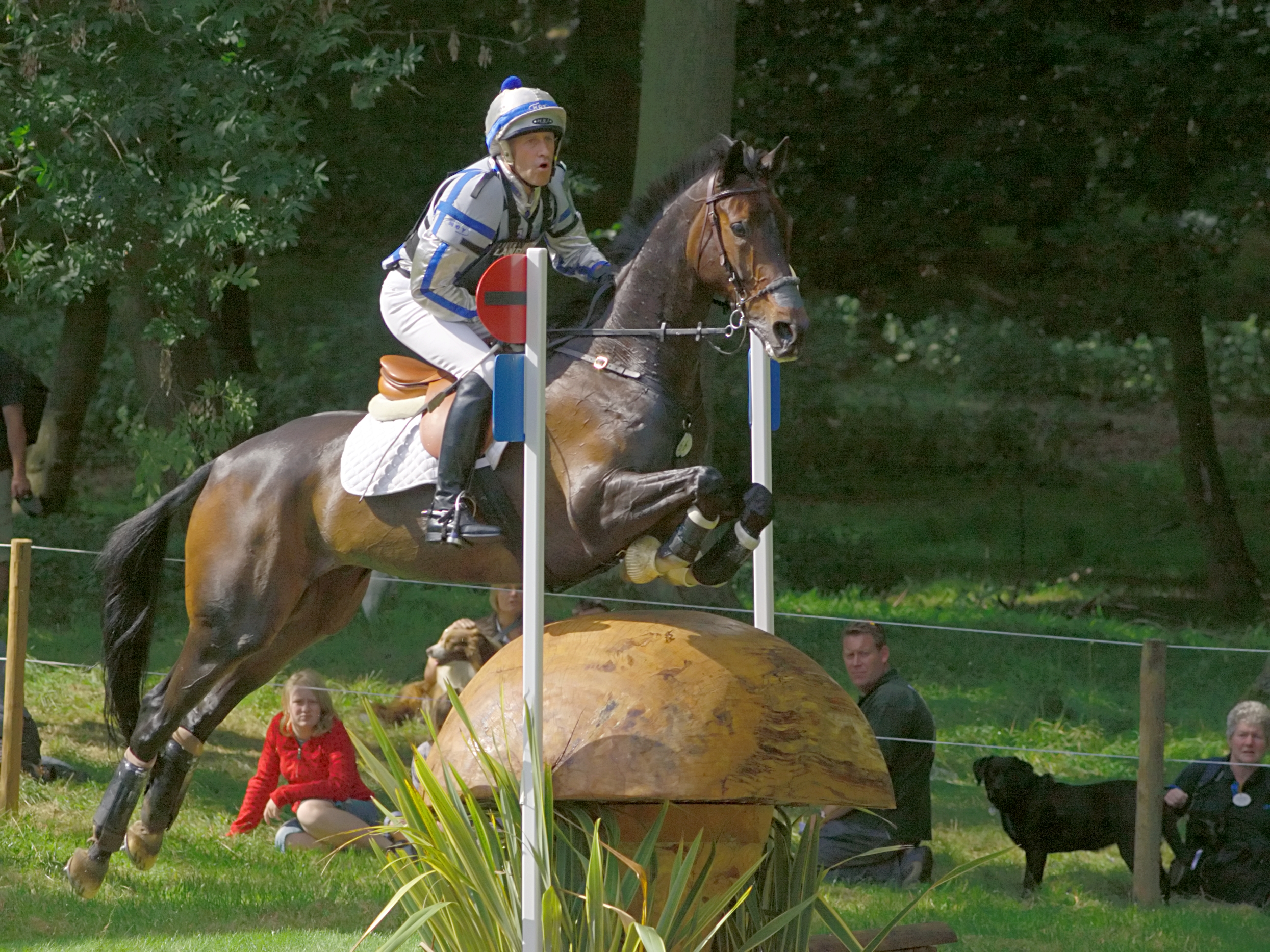
"Skinny" fences are designed to test the training of the horse and the rider's ability to ride accurately, and provide the horse an easy "way out" if the rider does a poor job

Cross-country courses for eventing are held outdoors through fields and wooded areas. The terrain is unique for each course, which usually incorporates the course into the natural terrain of the area, and therefore events in certain parts of the world may be held on mostly flat land, while others are over very strenuous hills.

Course designers may use the terrain to either help an inexperienced horse and rider prepare for an obstacle, or to make an obstacle more difficult for the experienced competitors. For example, the designer may place a fence at the opening of a wooded area, resulting in a lighting difference between the takeoff and landing side. This requires careful riding and a confident horse. Designers may make an obstacle more difficult by placing it along the side of a steep hill, at the top of a mound (so the horse can not see the landing until he is about to take off, testing bravery), or use the natural trees and ditches to force riders to take slightly more difficult lines to their fences.

It is desirable for obstacles to be incorporated into the landscape so that they seem natural, while still fairly testing the horse. Horses should also be provided an option to run-out if the rider makes a mistake. Most designers use accuracy fences, such as skinnies (fences with a narrow face) and corners, to make the rider's job more difficult while still being very "horse-friendly."

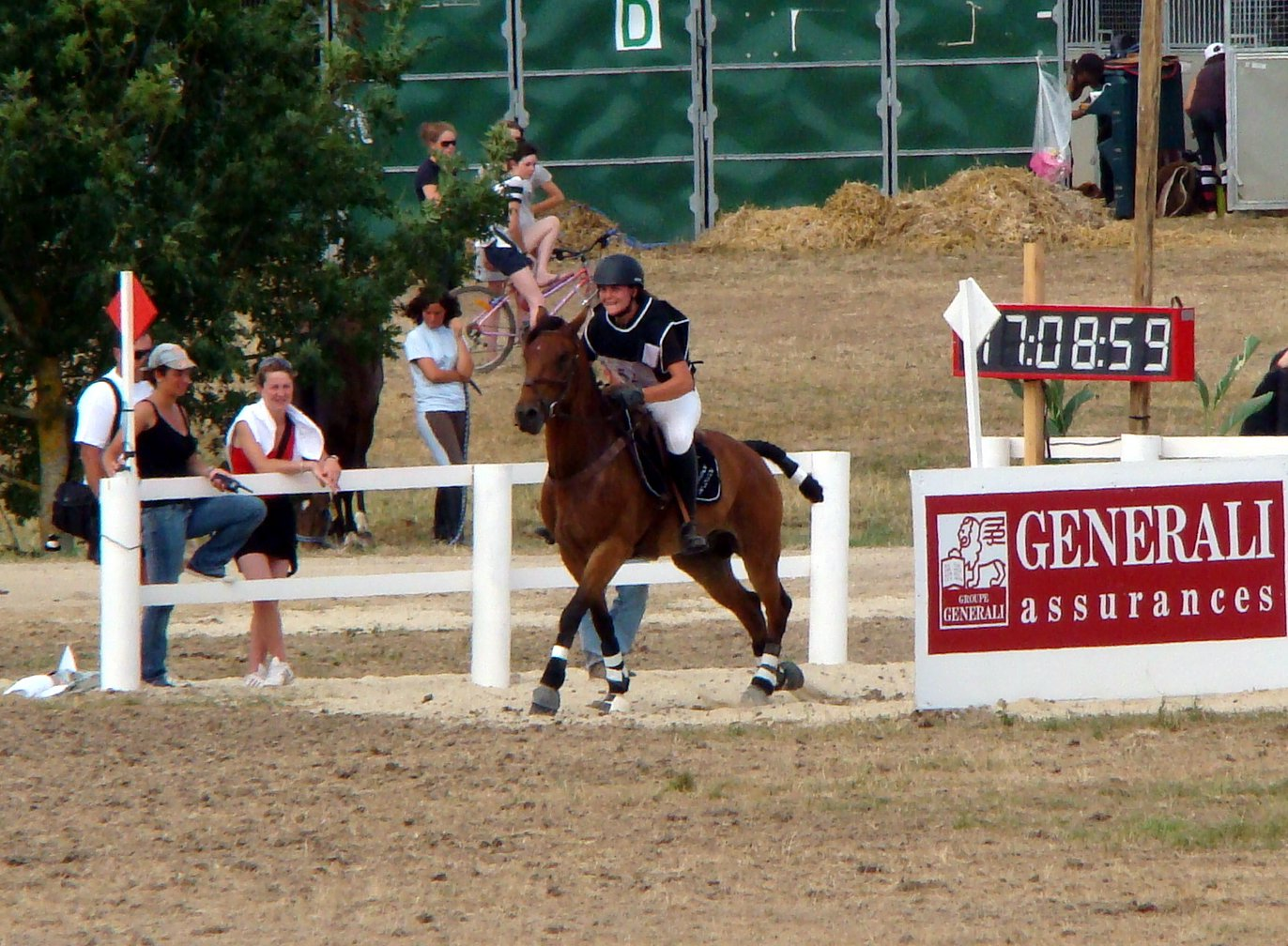
Competitor leaving from a starting box

All courses begin with a "start box", where the horse and rider wait as the time keeper begins to count-down to their start time. They are not allowed to go out the front of the box before the timer reaches zero on the count-down, nor are they allowed to have a flying start. The first few fences of most well-designed courses are usually straightforward and inviting, such as a large log or roll-top, which helps to build the horse and rider's confidence, get them settled in a galloping rhythm, and beginning to focus on the job at hand. The technicality of the obstacles then begins to increase, and elements such as banks, ditches, and water are introduced. The final fences of a course are usually slightly easier to allow the horse and rider to finish on a good note before they gallop across the finish.

=== Footing ===
Good footing is very important to most riders, as it helps decrease the wear-and-tear the sport has on their horses and avoid injury that may occur due to deep or slippery ground. The rider should always take care to note the footing while walking the course, and adjust the planned route to avoid patches that are especially boggy, slippery, or rough, and to avoid holes that may be present.

Footing is never used to make a course more difficult (for example, a fence is never purposely placed in a boggy area or one with sharp rocks). Instead, most competitions go out of their way to keep the footing safe, and many of the larger events may "groom" the footing to get it to the appropriate firmness.

=== Walking ===
Riders walk a cross-country course, usually between 1–3 times, before they actually ride it. This allows them to evaluate the course and determine how each jump needs to be ridden. While walking the course, riders need to be sure to pay attention to:

Questions
Name	Description
Type of fence	certain obstacles, such as a coffin or drop, need to be approached in a more collected, slower manner than other obstacles, such as a very wide oxer or a single brush fence.
Footing	to determine when they may need to slow down, which shoe studs would provide the best traction, and to alert them to footing changes which may surprise their horses (such as bluestone on the takeoff and landing of a jump, which back some horses off).
Lighting	light and dark questions occur when the horse must gallop into or out of woods or through shadows. Because the horse's eyes do not adjust quickly to light, great care must be taken on the approach to fences that are set near the boundary of a drastic change in light.
Terrain	Fences ridden up or downhill require a particular type of ride, as do fences with a drop on landing.
Line	the particular route a rider is going to take over an obstacle. This is especially important for combinations involving skinnies and corners, as a rider that can not hold a line will have a glance off from the horse, or from combinations that need to be angled to make the striding or to save time.
Striding	between combination obstacles, to indicate whether the rider needs to shorten or lengthen the horse's stride. Striding will vary according to the height and width of the obstacle, whether it is in water, on a hill, or going up or down a bank.
Openness	areas that are more open, such as a field, generally encourage forwardness from the horse. Galloping tracks through the woods, especially if they are windy, lose forwardness from the horse.
Course layout	courses that are "gallopy" with plenty of room between fences can help encourage a horse that is less brave, as the rider has plenty of room to get him forward and into a rhythm. They also give the rider a chance to make up time. Fences that are jumped towards other horses (such as toward warmup or stabling) generally make a horse more confident and eager. Additionally, the layout of the various "questions" a course designer asks can help build a horse's confidence: for example, a combination into water at the beginning of a course will help set up the horse for success for a more difficult drop fence into water later on in the course.
"Bogey" fences	obstacles that may be of concern to a particular horse or rider (for examples, some horses are less brave when jumping into water or over a ditch). These need to be ridden with extra confidence from the rider, and the rider must keep contact with the horse at all times.
Distractors	this includes livestock that are pastured near the course (such as cows and sheep), decorations on the fences which may scare certain horses, flags, etc. At the larger venues, such as the CCI**** events, crowds can be very distracting to some horses.

== Conditioning ==
Conditioning is an essential part of preparing a horse for cross-country. Although the lowest levels may not require anymore riding than the usual 5 or 6 days each week used to train the horse, all upper level horses are placed into strict conditioning programs. Most riders plan their schedule around per-determined events, taking into consideration the length of the particular course, the climate in which they will have to run their horse, the speed that will be required, and the terrain over which they will be traveling (such as hills). In extreme situations, such as when riders had to condition their mounts for the intense heat at the Athens Olympics, horses will be shipped in early to certain locations to help their body adjust.

The rider must also consider the starting condition of the horse, the breed which they will be competing (heavier breeds will require more conditioning than most Thoroughbreds), and most importantly, the individual horse. Horses which have been brought to peak fitness before will generally be easier to get back to top condition than a horse that has never had to work at that level. Some horses need more distance work and others more speed work. Determining these factors is generally done through experience.

=== Training for cross-country ===
All horses are started with distance work, at a slow speed (usually a walk or trot), to improve endurance. This "base" of fitness is vital to ensure the horse is physically sound enough to progress to more rigorous work, such as galloping. Horses who do not have a base are much more at risk for soft tissue injury. After a base has been placed on the horse, riders add in galloping sets to improve cardiovascular fitness. Most riders use interval training, in which the heart rate is raised to a certain level before the horse is allowed a rest, and then the horse is again asked to work before the heart has a chance to fully recover. This can improve the cardiovascular fitness of the horse with less overall galloping, helping to maintain the horse's soundness.

Work up an incline (hill work) is often favored over longer stretches of galloping for improving fitness, because it requires the horse to work harder while placing less wear-and-tear on their body. Through experience, a rider may gauge the difficulty of a hill and determine what its comparative worth is to galloping on a flat surface.

To condition the horse's bones, riders may walk on roads or other hard surfaces. However, this is generally only used when the ground conditions are quite soft. Although popular in Britain, most American riders do not do road work. If used too much, it can encourage arthritis.

Some riders also have access to equine treadmills or swimming pools. Treadmills can sometimes be adjusted to have a slight incline, allowing the horse to work without the added weight of the rider. Swimming is an excellent form of conditioning, and allows the rider to increase the horse's cardiovascular and muscular condition without adding undue stress to the bones or soft tissue.

=== Considerations ===
Riders should always be wary of the ground conditions. Conditioning on hard ground can cause lameness problems, both short and long-term. Conditioning on deep, heavy footing (such as right after a rain) increases the pull on the tendons, and may lead to soft tissue damage. Conditioning on slippery ground increases the risk that the horse will slip and have a soft-tissue injury. In general, older horses do better on softer footing, which is kinder to any joint problems they may have. Younger horses, which may not have the same strength of soft tissue, are best worked on slightly firmer ground.

The rider should also take care to slowly increase the amount of work. As a general rule, the distance may be increased or the speed may be increased, but not both at once. Pushing a horse too fast can lead to injury or lameness. The rider should also be aware of the horse's breathing, and feel how tired the animal is underneath. Horses conditioning for the upper levels are often conditioned with heart rate monitors, so the rider will have a great insight into the horse's condition over time.

The rider should always be willing to cut back conditioning work if the horse feels exhausted or if he has a very high respiration rate. Heat and humidity make work much harder, so should be considered while conditioning. Horses that are pushed too hard may injure themselves or may overheat, which can be deadly if not correctly cared for.

The rider must also understand that the muscling and improved cardiovascular fitness that is seen within a month or two of conditioning work does not indicate that the horse's entire body is at the same peak. Soft tissue can take several months to condition, and bone, up to a year.

== Ideal cross-country mount ==
At the lowest levels, most horses can be trained to successfully negotiate a cross-country course and, with proper conditioning, can usually make the time. As the rider moves up the levels, however, cross-country requires that the horse be very quick-thinking and well-trained, as the course increasingly becomes more technical and difficult to negotiate. The horse must also be very agile, and able to get out of a rough spot should a mistake occur. With proper training, the horse can develop what is referred to as a "fifth leg", or an ability to save himself from falling, even if he trips over a fence or has a "sticky" jump.

Horses at the upper levels need to be willing to jump a variety of obstacles (at the highest level, cars and trucks are sometimes on course). Horses are taught to think for themselves, and the high degree of obedience that is required in dressage is not always desirable, as the horse must not always be looking to the rider for help. However, the horse must still be very ride-able and adjustable: horses that "take over" on cross-country and ignore their rider are usually not able to get through the more technical questions.

As horses move up the levels, their jumping ability becomes increasingly more important. Although horses do not need to have a very "round" jump—indeed, large bascule is often detrimental to an event horse while on cross-country because it wastes energy and time, and also makes certain jump efforts, such as drop fences, bigger than they really are—the horse should have a safe jump, with the forearms parallel to the ground or higher. The horse should also have enough scope to clear the obstacles, which although they never get exceedingly high (maximum of 3"11") can be very wide.

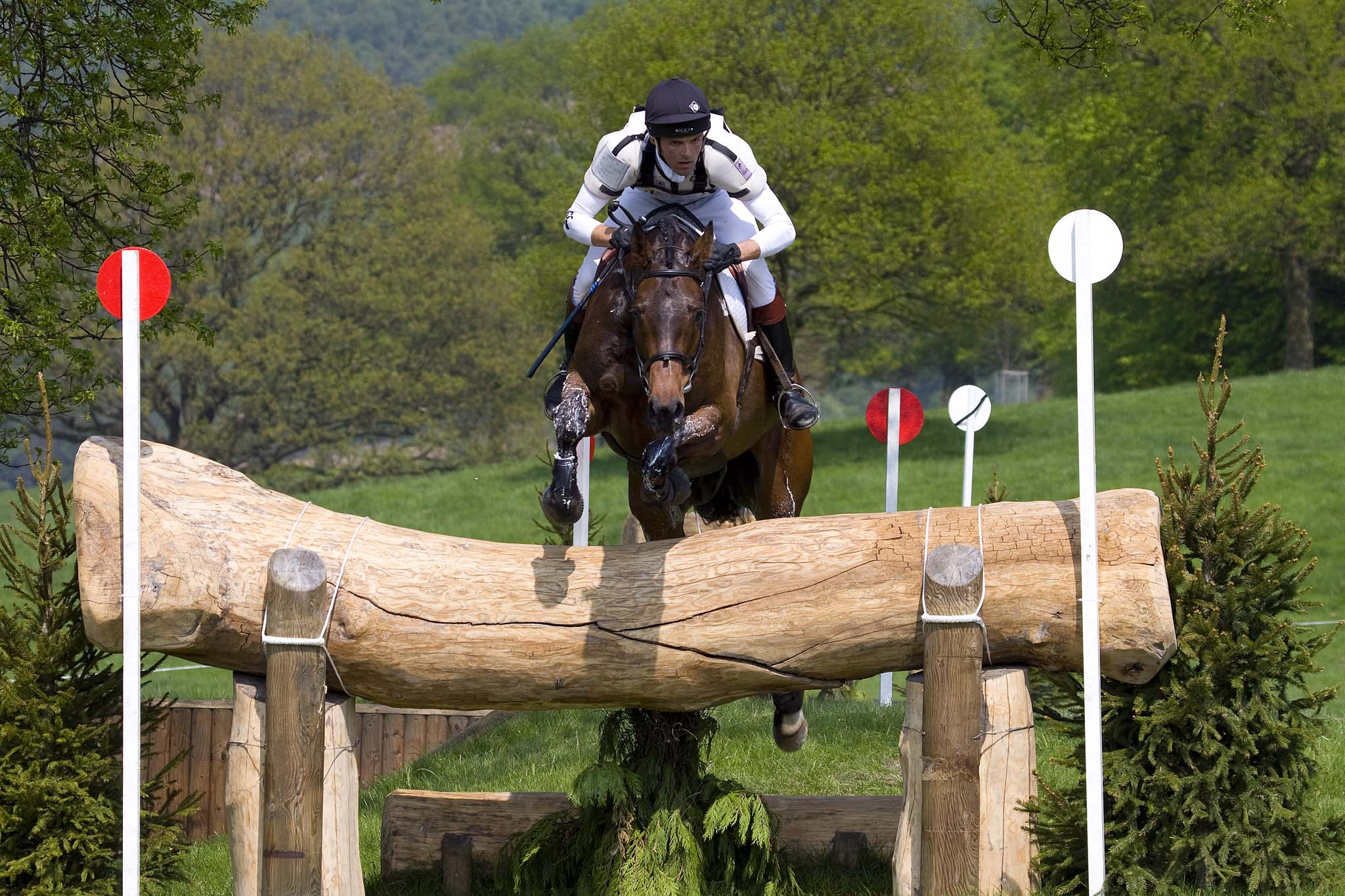
The horse is not required to have ideal jumping form, but should be brave and scopey enough to do the job.

An increase in level will also lead to an increase in the difficulty of the cross-country test: the course will be longer, with a greater number of jumping elements, more physically demanding terrain, and a faster speed required to make the time. Therefore, upper level horses must be able to achieve a high level of speed and stamina through training. Horses that are heavily muscled, such as draft horses, or those with short strides will require a greater amount of energy to complete the course and may not have the speed needed, regardless of the training they receive. Horses must also have good conformation and be naturally sound, as poorly-conformed horses will not be able to physically hold up to the demands that are placed on them. Most horses that compete today are Thoroughbreds, Thoroughbred-crosses (including the Irish Horse), and lightly built Warmbloods, or Warmbloods with a high degree of Thoroughbred blood, such as the Trakehner. However, should the horse possess the qualities needed to get around an upper-level course, breed is considered secondary to athletic ability.

== Scoring ==
Because the lowest score wins, each combination of horse and rider seeks to complete the cross-country with as few penalties as possible. If larger faults occur, such as multiple refusals, the horse will be eliminated (E) from competition and will not be allowed to finish the course. Elimination has also been subdivided in the United States to include Technical Elimination (TE), if a mistake is made that is unrelated to the horse (for example, jumping two fences in the wrong order). Riders may also choose to retire (R) on course if their horse is having a poor run. This prevents the rider from continuing the competition, but is often a good choice if the horse is physically or mentally over faced by the challenges. Mandatory Retirement (MR) occurs if the horse falls, even if he is not noticeably injured, to help protect the horse's welfare. Withdrawing (W) only occurs if the horse is taken out of competition when he is not on course. Rider may be disqualified (DQ) if they endanger their mount or other people on course. The United States added Dangerous Riding penalties in 2007, to be added at the discretion of the ground jury if a rider is going around the course in an unsafe manner (for example, at an extreme speed).

=== Disobediences from the horse ===
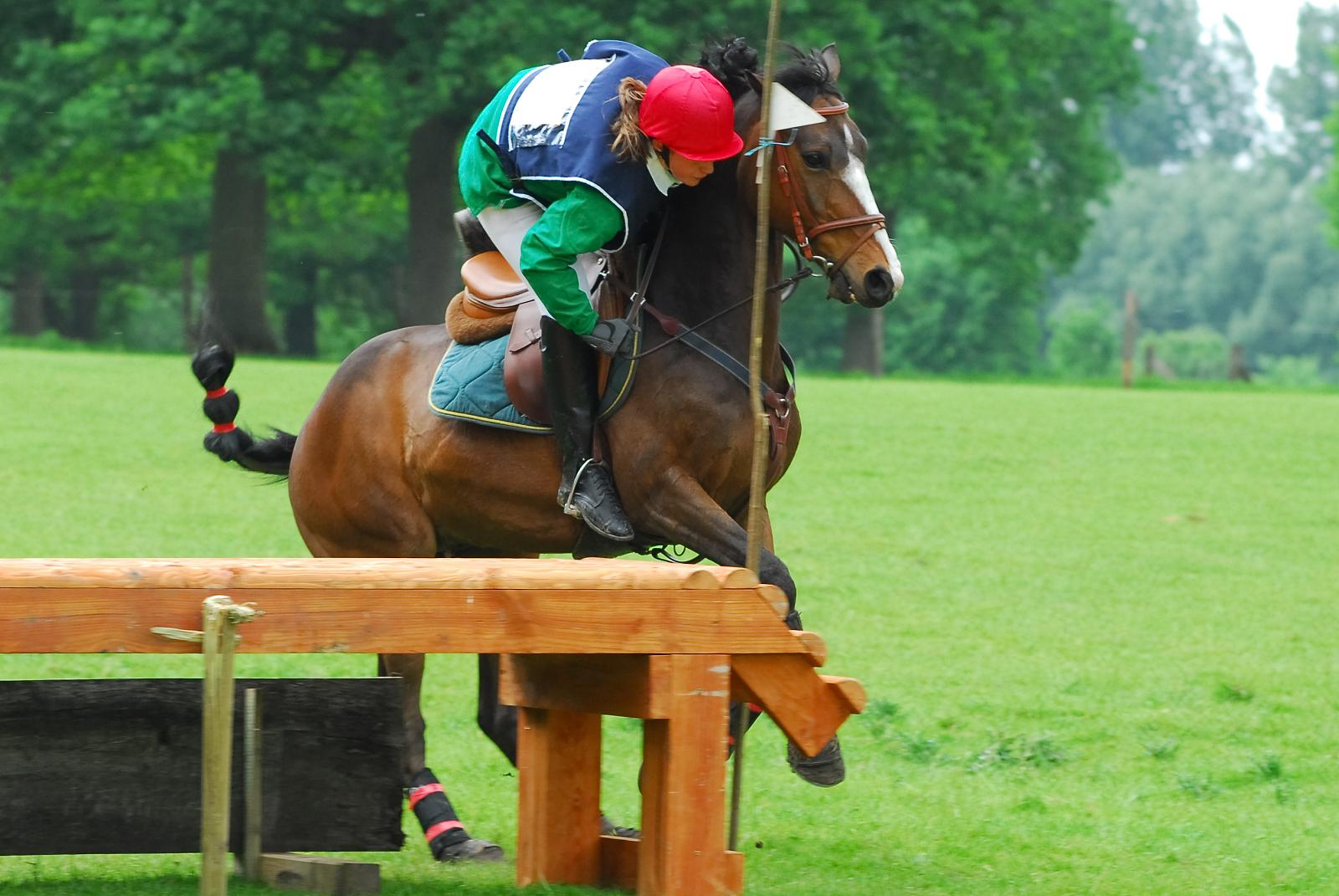
A refusal results in 20 penalties.

- First refusal or crossing tracks (circling) in front of an obstacle: 20 penalties per obstacle
- 2nd refusal or crossed tracks at the same obstacle: 40 additional penalties
- 3rd refusal or crossed tracks at the same obstacle (an "obstacle" includes all its elements): elimination
- 4th cumulative refusal or crossed tracks on the entire course: elimination

=== Errors on course ===
- Jumping obstacles in the wrong order (#5 before #4, or element B before A): elimination
- Jumping a fence in a direction which is not flagged: elimination
- Omission of a jump or compulsory passage: elimination
- Note: the only time a competitor may jump an obstacle twice in a row is if a refusal occurs at a second element (B) and the rider can not approach "B" without re-jumping "A" (a bounce, for example)
- Note: the horse is only allowed to jump from a standstill if the obstacle's height is no higher than 30 cm (for example, banks and ditches). Jumping any other obstacles from a standstill (a "prolonged halt") counts as a refusal.
- Note: horses are allowed to step sideways, but any step back is considered a refusal.

=== Falls ===
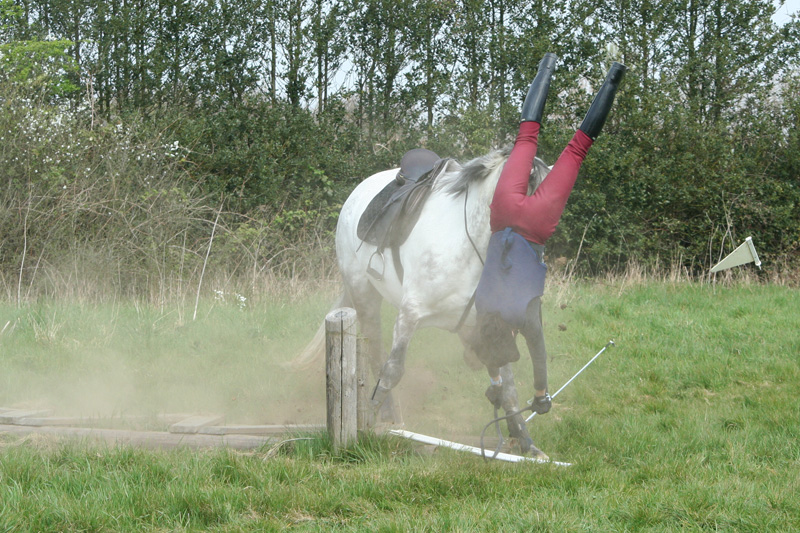
Fall of rider results in elimination

- Fall of Rider: Elimination
- Fall of horse (quarters and shoulder touches ground): Mandatory retirement
- Note: riders may dismount at any time on course without penalty. Dismounts attributed to attempting an obstacle are penalized as a fall.

=== Time faults ===
- Every second commenced above the optimum time, rounded up to the nearest second: 0.4 penalties/sec
- Exceeding the allowed time (2× the optimum time): elimination
- In the United States, going too fast for the level will result in "Speed Faults": 0.4 penalties/sec for every second under the Speed fault time
- Trying to increase one's time, or "willful delay", to avoid speed faults (circling, serpentining, walking, or halting between the final fence and the finish): 20 penalties

=== Other reasons for elimination ===
- Rider without headgear or a fastened harness strap
- Improper saddlery (for example, riding with a running martingale and no rein stops)
- Overtaking another rider on course in a dangerous manner (for example, jumping a fence at the same time as the other rider)
- Willful obstruction of an overtaking competitor
- Failure to stop on course when signaled
- Horses head and front shoulder outside of the flags
- In lower level cross country competitions, failure to wear medical armband (at discretion of Ground Jury)

== Levels of eventing ==
In the United States, eventing begins at the Beginner Novice level, followed by Novice, Training, Preliminary, Intermediate, and then Advanced. Levels in the UK begin with BE80(T) – a training level event which runs slightly differently from normal classes, then BE90 (formerly known as Intro), then BE100 (formerly Pre-novice). In 2009, the Intro and Pre Novice classes were renamed BE90 and BE100 (the numbers relate to the height of the cross country fences in centimeters) in the hopes of making the sport easier to understand for the general public. In 2010, British Eventing introduced "Foundation Points" at the BE90 and BE100 levels in order to prove a horse's success at the lower levels. Levels then continue from Novice, through Intermediate to Advanced at which success points are awarded to the top finishers (the number of finishers receiving points depends on the number of competitors in the event). A horse will accumulate points throughout its career (regardless of rider) and when a certain number of points have been reached the horse must compete at the next level up. Exceptions to this are the 'open' classes, at which any horse can compete regardless of career success and also a horse may be allowed to compete in an event as hors concours, which means not eligible to be placed or awarded prizes or points. BE100+, Intermediate-Novice and Advanced-Intermediate are interim classes where the dressage and show jumping runs at the higher level, with the cross-country at the lower level. For example, an Intermediate-Novice class uses an Intermediate dressage test and Intermediate standard Show Jumping, but the cross-country takes place round a Novice level track. These classes are intended to help horse and rider step up to a higher level without the initial risk of the more demanding cross-country. The highest level of Cross Country is 5* forms part of international 3 day eventing.

Level	Meter distance	Meters-per-minute speed	Efforts	Fixed height	Brushed height	Highest point spread	Base spread	Ditch width	Max drop height
Preliminary (USA)	2200–3200	520	24–32	1.10 metres (3 ft 7 in)	1.30 metres (4 ft 3 in)	1.40 metres (4 ft 7 in)	2.10 metres (6 ft 11 in)	2.80 metres (9 ft 2 in)	1.60 metres (5 ft 3 in)
Intermediate	2600–3600	550	28–36	1.15 metres (3 ft 9 in)	1.35 metres (4 ft 5 in)	1.60 metres (5 ft 3 in)	2.40 metres (7 ft 10 in)	3.20 metres (10 ft 6 in)	1.80 metres (5 ft 11 in)
Advanced	3000–4000	570	32–40	1.20 metres (3 ft 11 in)	1.40 metres (4 ft 7 in)	1.80 metres (5 ft 11 in)	2.70 metres (8 ft 10 in)	3.60 metres (11 ft 10 in)	2.00 metres (6 ft 7 in)

== Types of cross country obstacles ==
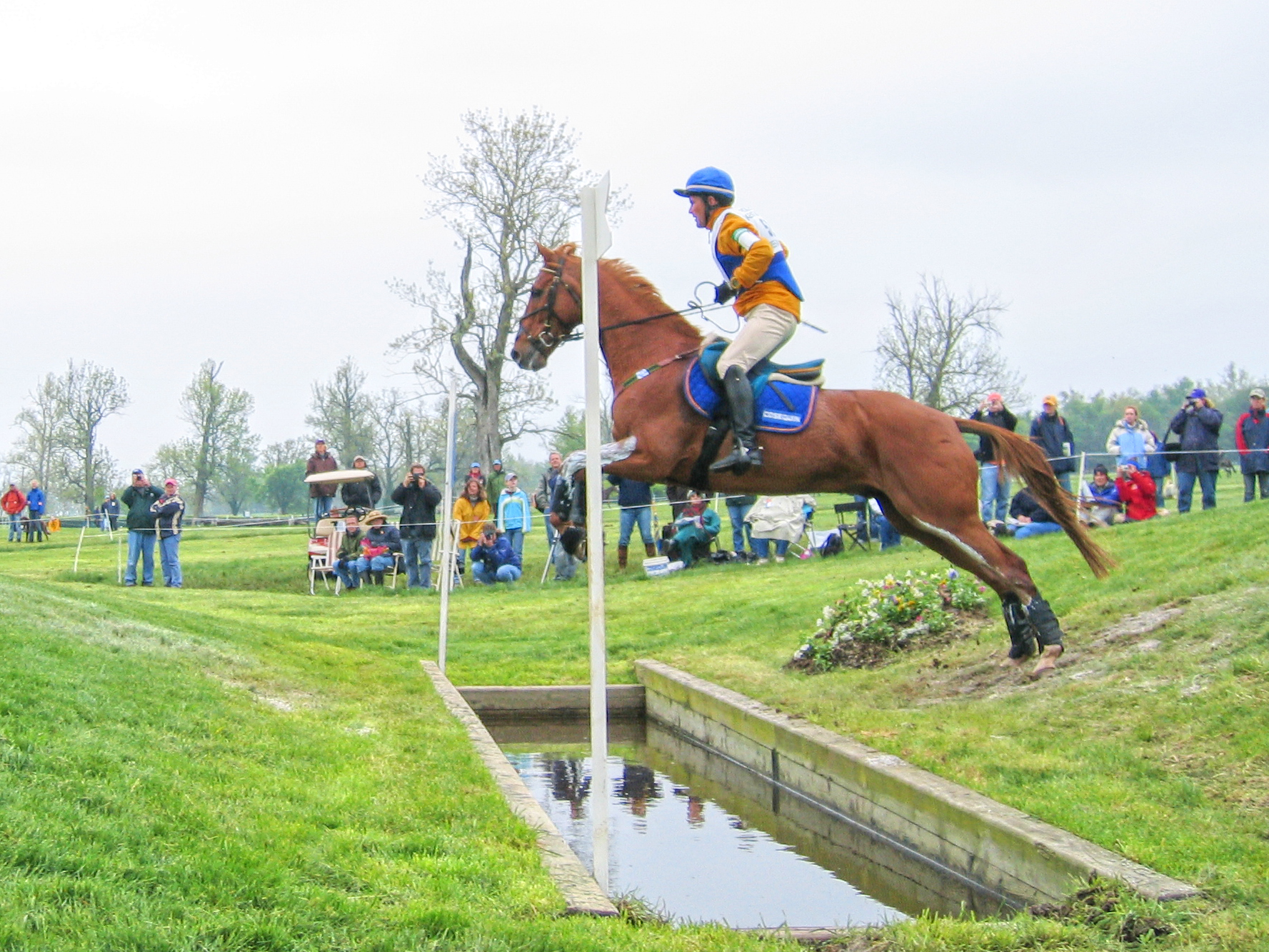
Horse and rider negotiating the ditch element of a coffin

There are many different types of cross county obstacles, all designed, in some degree, to imitate or resemble obstacles that a horse and rider could theoretically encounter in actual cross-country riding. Some obstacles are single jumps, or "verticals" made of different types of materials. Some may have multiple elements taken in a single jump, such as triple bars or oxers, sometimes called "spread" fences. Water obstacles are also usually used on most courses, as are log jumps. Yet others are combinations of several elements including logs, banks, water, and ditches.

== See also ==
- Eventing
- Indoor cross-country

== Sources ==
- 2007 United States Equestrian Federation Rules for Eventing. pp 39–42, 65.
- Wofford, James C. Training the Three-Day Event Horse and Rider. Doubleday Equestrian Library, New York, NY. Copyright 1995.
