= Horse jumping obstacles =

Items jumped over by horses in some equestrian sports

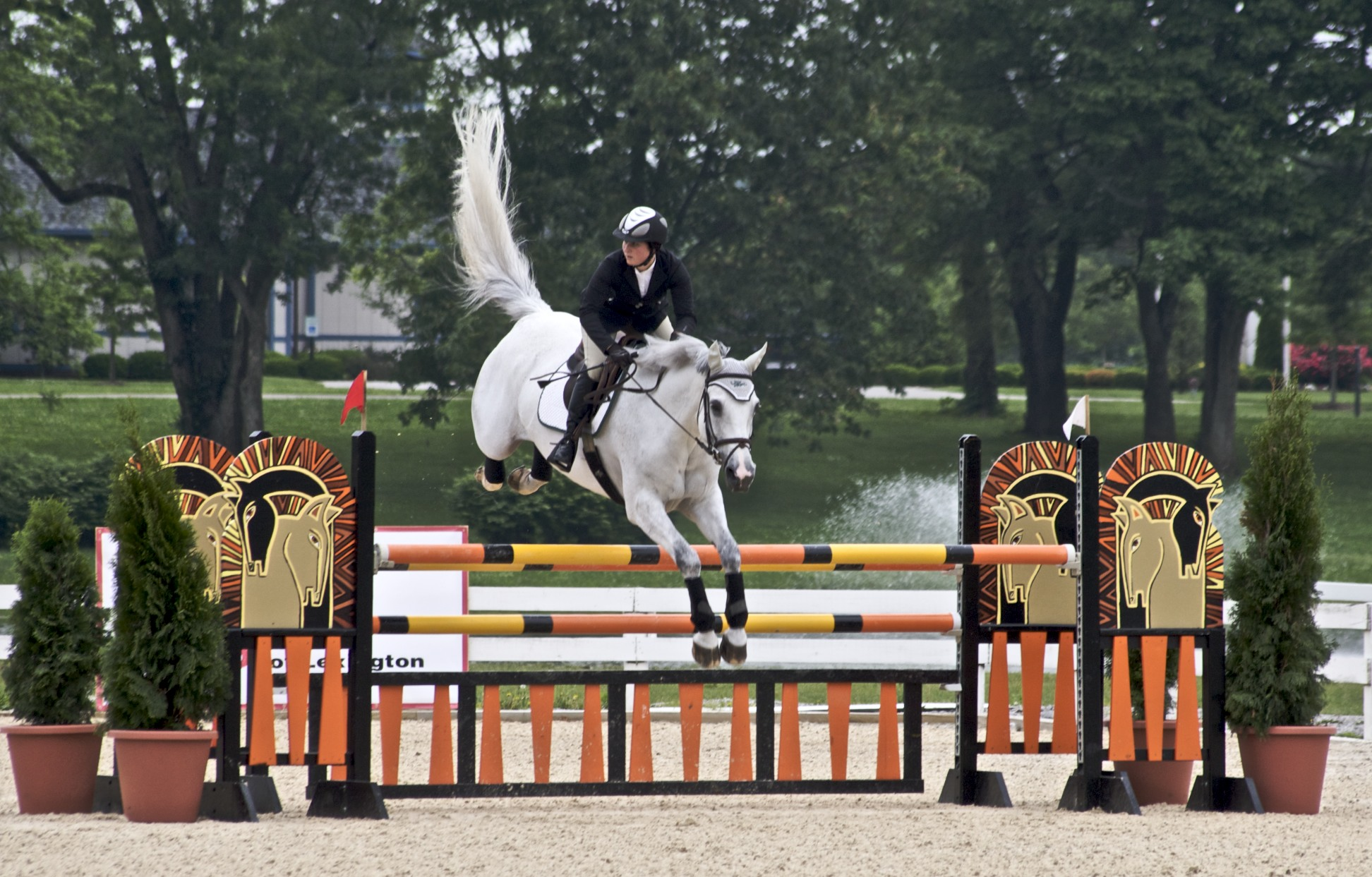
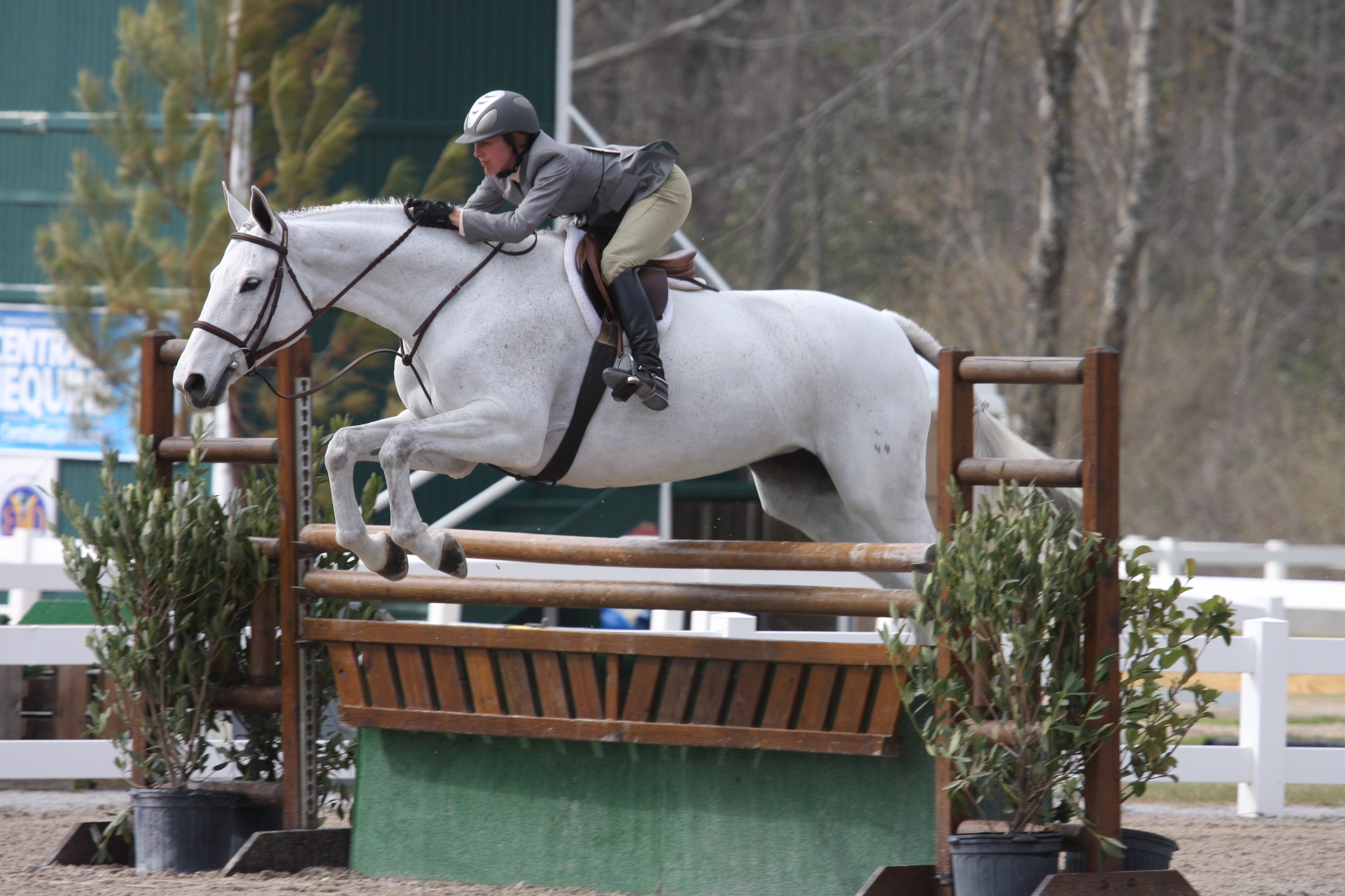
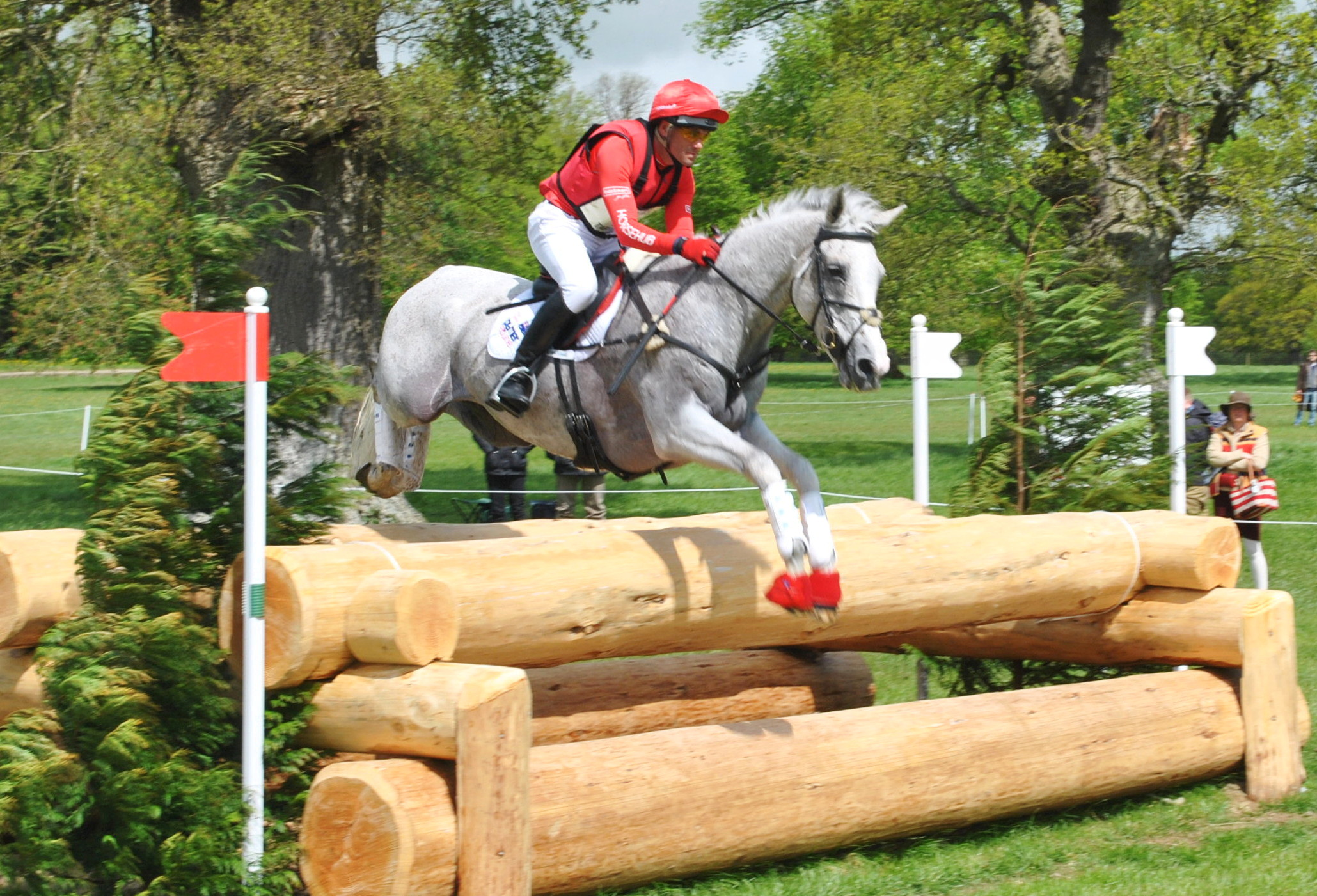
Show jumping, hunter class, and eventing obstacles

Many types of obstacles are found in competitive horse jumping sports such as show jumping, hunter classes, and the cross-country phase of eventing. The size and type of obstacles vary depending on the course designer and the expected difficulty level of a particular competition. Horses will need to negotiate many types of obstacles in order to be successful in jumping sports.

Fences used in show jumping are often brightly colored and artistically designed, while hunter and eventing fences are generally made to look rustic and natural. Show jumping and hunter obstacles are constructed to fall down if struck by the horse, whereas eventing obstacles have traditionally been solidly built—though to prevent dangerous rotational falls, certain elements are now being designed to break away when hit.

== Arrowhead ==
Also called chevrons, these fences are shaped like triangles, with the point facing towards the ground. They are generally very narrow, usually only a few feet wide. Arrowhead fences require the rider to keep their horse straight between their hands and legs, as it is easy for a run-out to occur due to the narrowness of the fence. These fences are often used in combination with other obstacles to increase their difficulty, such as right after a bank or as the second obstacle in a bending line. This tests the rider's ability to regain control of his/her horse following an obstacle.

== Bank ==
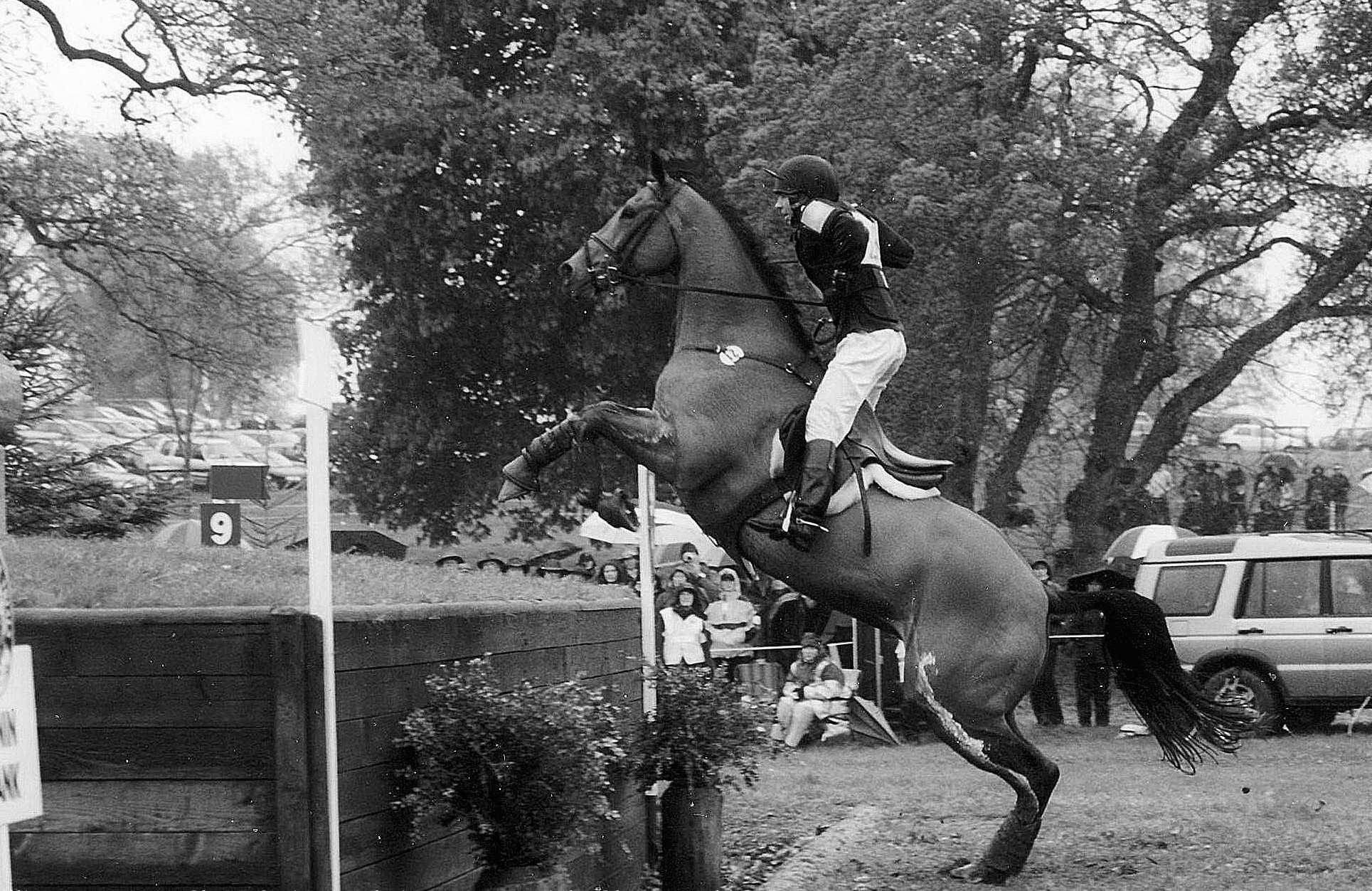
An uphill bank

These jumps are steps up or down from one level to another, and can be single jumps or built as a "staircase" of multiple banks. Banks up require large amounts of impulsion, although not speed, from the horse. The drop fence incorporates a down bank. Both types of banks require the rider to be centered over the horse. Down banks require the rider to lean further back, with slipped reins and heels closer to the front of the horse, in order to absorb the shock of the landing.

== Bounce ==
Animation showing an endless loop of horses clearing bounce type obstacles

A bounce, also called a no-stride, is a fence combination sometimes found on the cross-country course of eventing. It is also very commonly used in grid-work or gymnastics. It consists of two fences placed close together so the horse cannot take a full stride between them, but not so close that the horse would jump both fences at once. The horse "bounces" between the two jumps, so that the next takeoff is in the same stride as the previous landing. The distance between the two usually is 7–8 feet for small ponies; 9 ft for large ponies or small horses; and 9.5–11 ft for horses. A bounce (or several can be used in a row for more advanced horses) teaches the horse good balance, to push off with his hind end, and to fold his front end well. It can also be used to slow down a speedy horse, as a horse cannot go flying over a bounce (he/she will knock a rail) as he could with a single jump.

== Brush fence ==
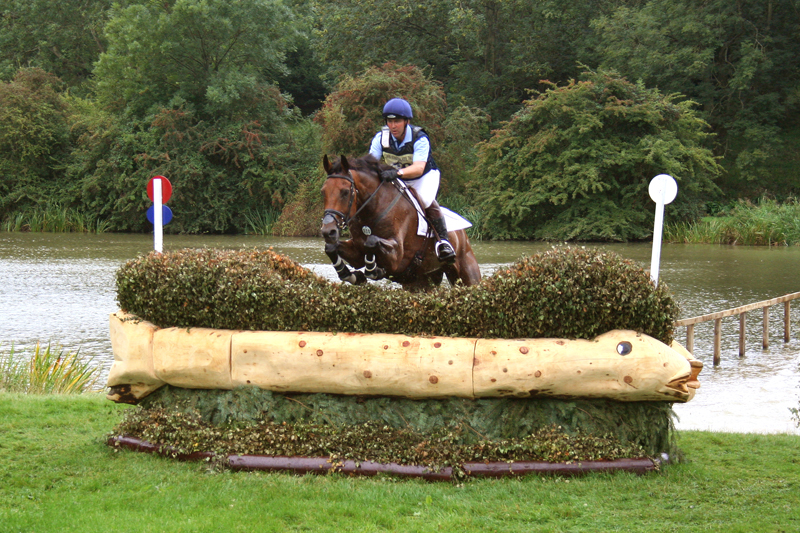
A brush fence

These jumps consist of a solid base with a brush placed on top, generally low enough for the horse to see over. The horse is supposed to jump through the brush in a flat jump, rather than over the top of it in a more rounded arc. Brush fences are also used for steeplechase racing. This type of fence is closely related to the bullfinch. Sometimes the fence is painted to camouflage in with the brush, so it is unseen by both horse and rider.

== Bullfinch ==
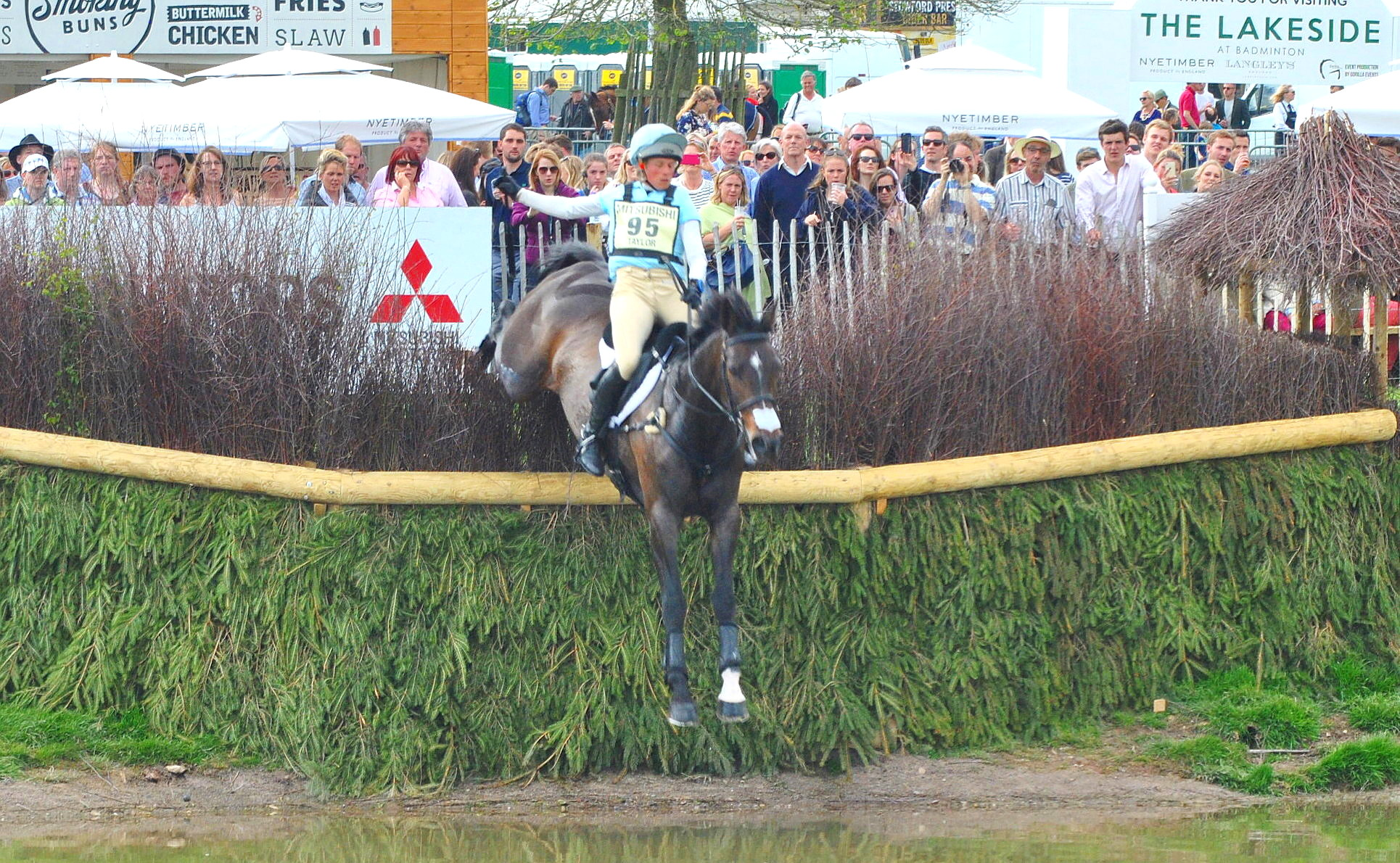
A bullfinch

This fence has a solid base with several feet of brush protruding out of the top of the jump up to six feet high. The horse is supposed to jump through the brush, rather than over it. Due to the height of the brush, the horse generally cannot see the landing. This tests the horse's trust in the rider, as the horse must depend on the rider to guide it carefully and steer it to a solid landing. The horse must be taught to jump calmly through the brush, as attempting to jump over the brush could lead to a refusal, a run-out at the next fence, or a misstep and possible injury. Bullfinches must be approached positively, with much impulsion, in order to prevent stops. When jumping a bullfinch, the rider must stay tight in the saddle so that brush cannot be caught between his or her leg and the horse.

== Coffin ==
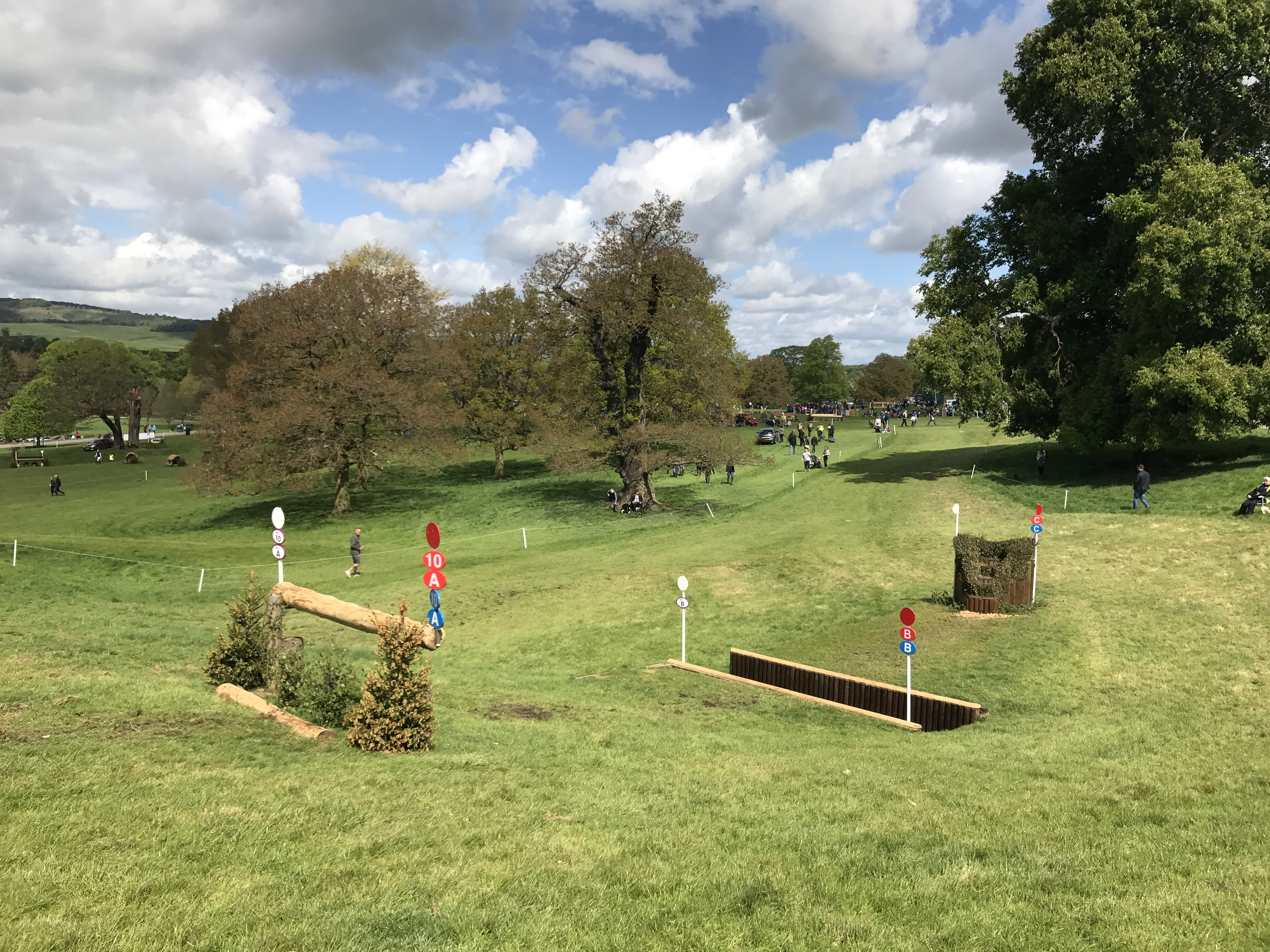
This coffin is a combination of rail, ditch, skinny

Also called the rails-ditch-rails, the coffin is a combination fence where the horse jumps a set of rails, moves one or several strides downhill to a ditch, and then goes back uphill to another jump. In the past, coffins were more pronounced, with up-and-down banks leading to the ditch in the middle. However, today only the former type with the rails is seen. The coffin is intended to be jumped in a slow, impulsive canter (known to eventers as a "coffin canter" for that reason). This canter gives the horse the power and agility to negotiate the obstacle, and also allows him the time needed to assess what is being asked, so that he may better complete the combination without problem. Approaching in a fast, flat gallop will cause mis-striding and may entice a refusal from the horse. Going too fast may also result in a fall, if the horse cannot physically make a stride between the obstacles.

== Combinations ==
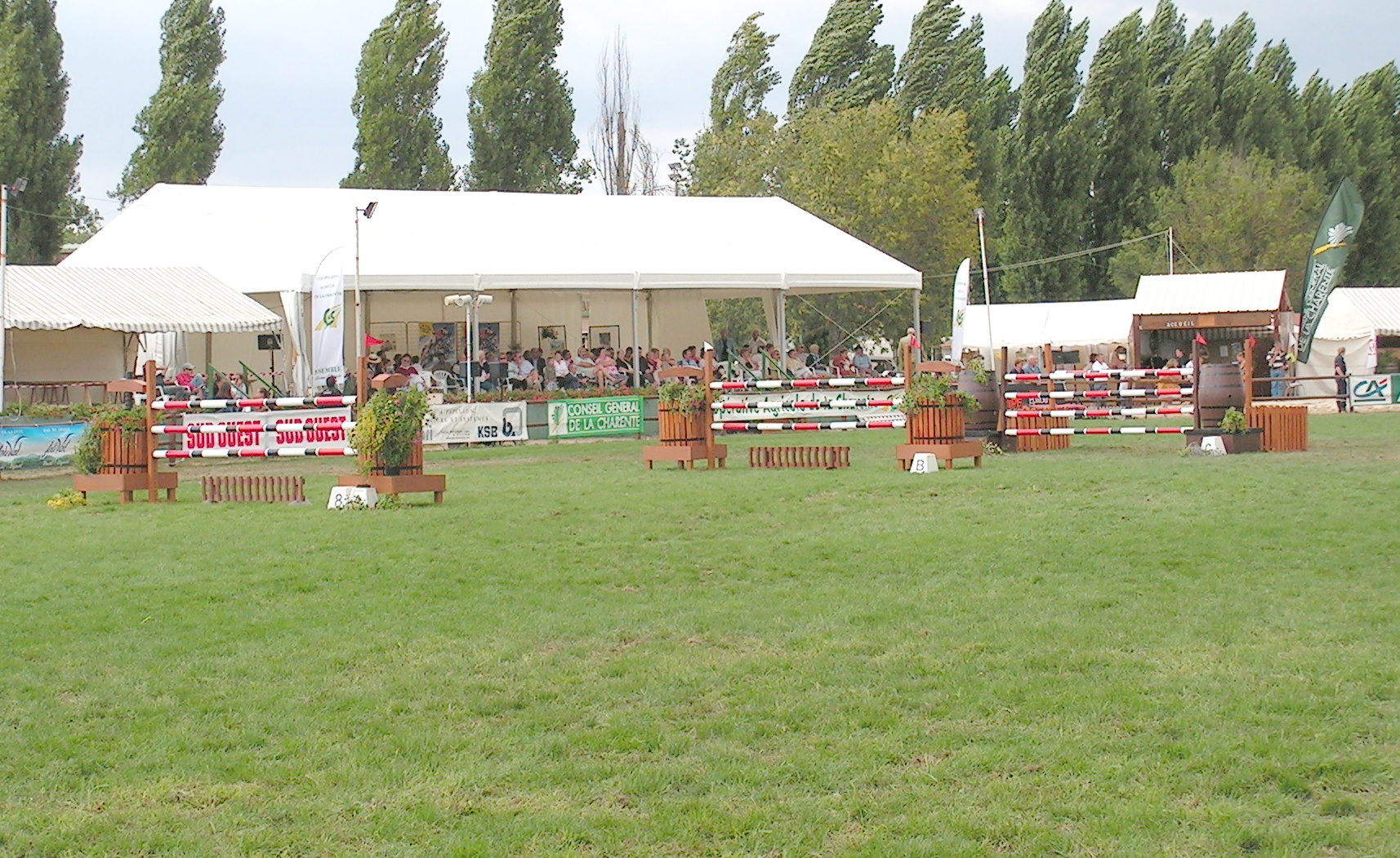
A triple combination

These fences are combinations of banks, logs, water, ditches and other elements. All of the jumps are placed within 1–3 strides of each other, and are meant to be jumped as a series in a specific order. Also see Normandy bank, Sunken road, and Coffin. They are seen in the equestrian jumping sports of show jumping and eventing (both the cross-country and stadium jumping phases), but are uncommon in hunt seat competition.

Combinations are often one of the challenges of a course, and the course designer knows how to manipulate the distances and types of obstacles to make them more difficult.

Combinations are named by their number of elements. Double and triple combinations are the most common. In general, the more elements involved, the more difficult the obstacle. However, other variables can greatly influence the difficulty:

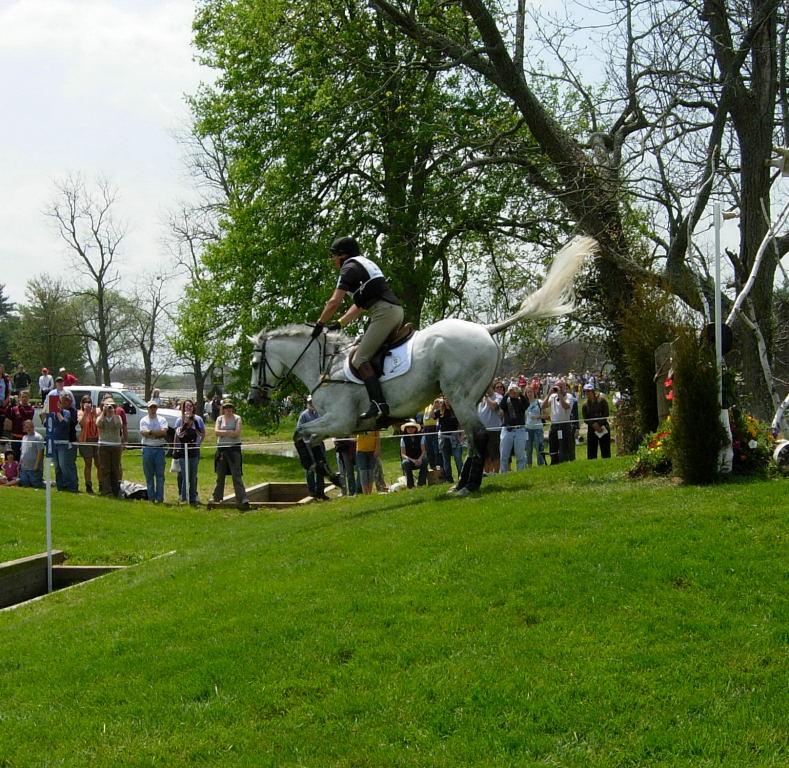
A "coffin:" a cross-country combination which incorporates change in terrain, striding, and different types of obstacles

1. Distance between Obstacles: the course designer may shorten or lengthen the distance from the usual 12-foot stride. The most extreme case is when the designer puts enough room for a half-stride, in which case the rider must shorten or lengthen according to the horse's strengths. At the lower levels, the designer will not change the distances from what is considered "normal" for the combination. Additionally, the designer may make the distance between the first two elements of a combination ask for one type of stride—for example, very long—and the distance between the second and third elements ask for the exact opposite type of stride—in this case, very short. This tests the horse's adjustability, and can greatly enhance the difficulty of the combination.
2. Types and Order of the Obstacles: Riders must adjust their horse's stride according to the type of obstacle that must be jumped, and the order they occur. For example, a vertical to oxer rides differently from an oxer to vertical. Horses take off and land at different distances from the obstacle depending on its type: usually closer for triple bars, slightly further for oxers, and even further for verticals. Other factors, such as a "spooky" fence or a liverpool, may change the distances for particular horses as they back them off.
3. Height of the Obstacles: The higher the fences, the less room there is for error. At the lower levels, the designer may make certain elements in the combination slightly lower, to make it easier. Fence height also has some influence on the horse's take-off distance, usually decreasing both the take-off and landing, although this is only a great variant when the fences are 4 feet 6 inches or higher.
4. Terrain: this is especially a factor for eventers as they ride combinations cross-country. A combination on the downhill tends to lengthen the stride, and on the uphill it tends to shorten it. Going through water tends to shorten the stride. Landing up a bank causes a shorter landing distance than from an upright obstacle.

To negotiate a combination successfully, a rider must maintain the qualities needed in all riding: rhythm, balance, and impulsion as they approach the fence. They must also have a great understanding of their horse's stride length, so that they may know how much they need to shorten or lengthen it for each particular combination.

Before riding the course, the rider should walk the distances of the combination and decide the stride from which they should jump it.

== Coop ==
A coop is a triangular obstacle shaped like the roof of an A-frame building.

== Corner ==
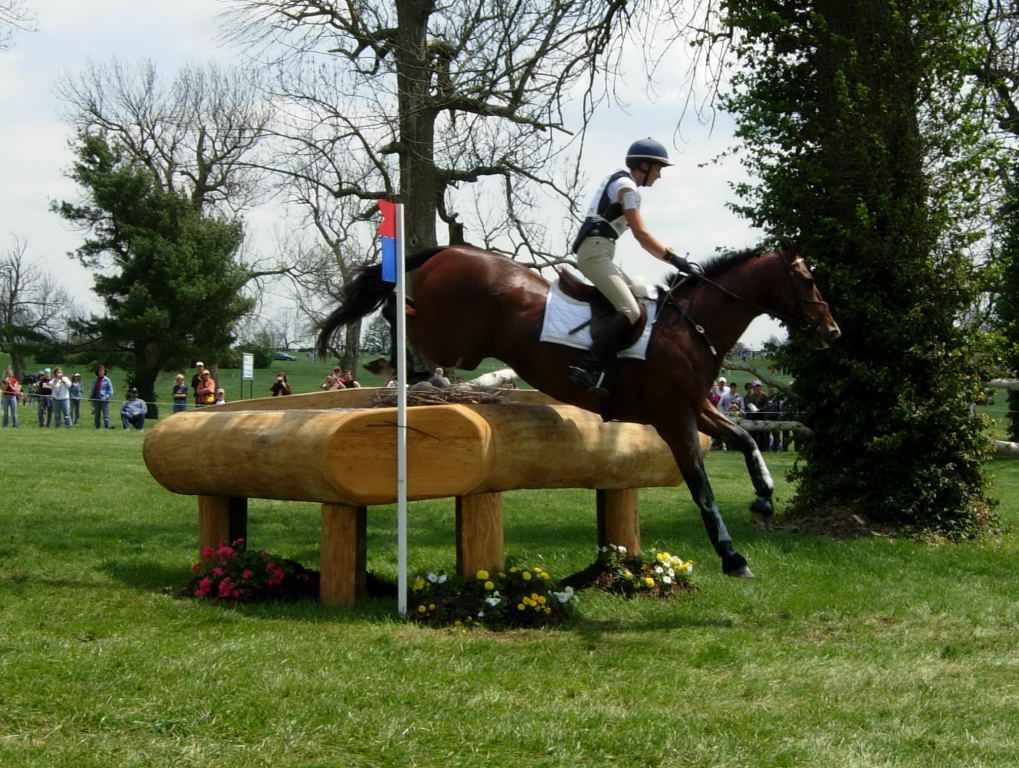
Horse and rider negotiating a corner

Also called an apex, a corner fence has a triangular shape, with the horse jumping over one corner of the triangle. They are similar to the "fan" jump seen in show-jumping. As the name suggests, the fence makes a "V" shape, that can have an angle up to 90 degrees. At novice levels, the fence is formed by two angled fences, open in the center while more advanced designs have a solid triangular cover. The corner is meant to be jumped on a line perpendicular to an imaginary bisecting line of the angle, and as close to the narrow apex as possible while still far enough in on the jump that the horse knows he is supposed to go over it. If the rider aims too far toward the wider section of the obstacle, it may be too wide for the horse to clear it. This usually results in a stop or run out, although some of the braver horses might "bank" a solid corner fence (touching down on it before quickly jumping off). This is not desirable, as the horse is more likely to slip, catch a leg, or fall. If the rider aims too far toward the apex, it is very easy for the horse to run right past, especially if it is unsure as to whether he is to jump the obstacle. Due to their relative difficulty, the corner is not seen at the lowest levels. The corner is a precision fence, requiring accurate riding and good training, with the horse straight and between the rider's aids. Due to the build of the fence, an uncommitted horse and rider pair may have a run-out at this type of obstacle. It is best that the rider use their aids to "block" the horse from running out to the side, with a strong contact to prevent the shoulders from popping, and a supporting leg.

== Ditch ==
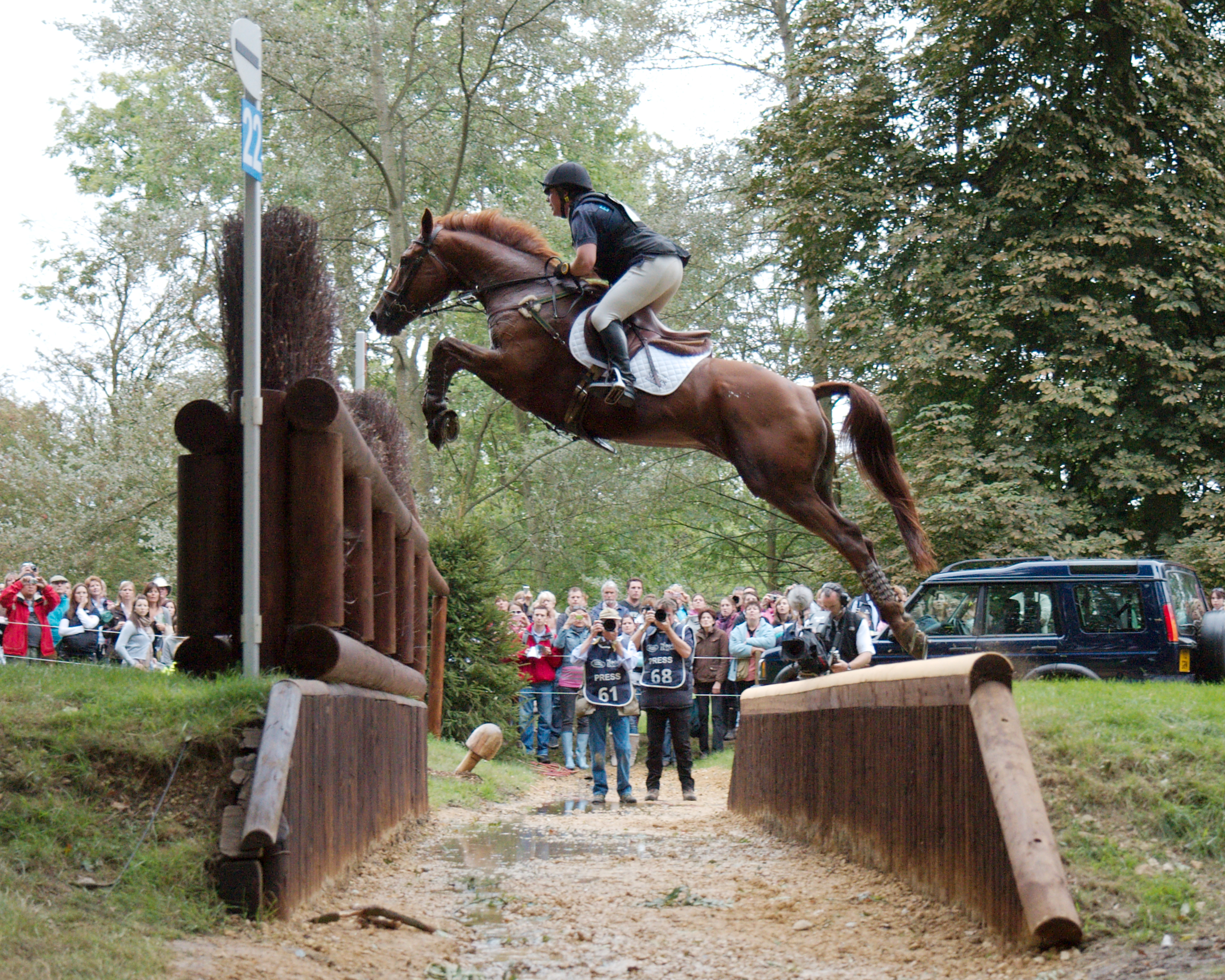
A ditch in front of a rail fence

These fences are dropped areas in the course that may be up to 11 feet 10 inches wide in advanced competition, although they are seen at lesser widths at all levels of competition. They can be used individually, or in combinations such as the coffin and trakehner fences. Ditches should be ridden positively, with increased stride length and forward motion. The rider should always focus ahead, rather than looking down into the ditch, to keep their balance aligned correctly and allow the horse to give their best effort.

== Drop fence ==
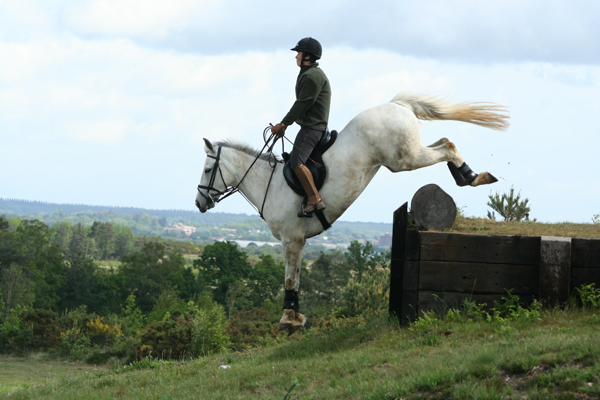
A drop fence

These fences ask the horse to jump over a log fence and land at a lower level than the one at which they took off. They are closely related to the bank fences. Many riders have fallen badly on drop fences if the horse swerves unexpectedly. Jumping drop fences places a good deal of stress on the horse's legs, and therefore practice should be kept to a minimum. To help minimise the concussion on the horse's legs, the rider should encourage it to jump the fence as conservatively as possible, with little bascule or speed, using just enough power to safely clear the log before dropping down.

Drop fences require a great deal of trust of the horse in the rider, because often the animal can not see the landing until it is about to jump. It is important for the rider to keep their leg on to the base, and not "drop" the horse before the fence, as this may result in a refusal. In the air, the rider usually allows their shoulders to move slightly forward, and lifts their seatbones off the saddle until the peak of the jump. However, as the horse descends, the rider should allow their upper body to open, keeping their body relatively upright (especially if the drop is large). If the rider continues to lean forward on landing, it is much more likely that they will topple forward and become unseated when the horse touches the ground, due to the momentum. This is especially true with drops because the landing is almost always slightly downhill, as this helps reduce concussion on the horse's legs. The rider must also be sure to slip their reins as the horse descends, allowing the horse the freedom to stretch its neck forward and down. Many riders, especially those who have only jumped in the ring, believe cross-country riders to be falling backward (or getting "left behind") when they jump a drop fence. More security is needed when jumping this type of fence than is typically required when jumping in a level arena. Additionally, the fences are solid, so the rider need not worry about dropping a rail (as would typically happen if he began sitting up too soon when riding a fence in show jumping). The rider is not trying to encourage a great bascule from the horse. Although it may appear that the rider is getting left behind, a properly ridden drop fence will keep the rider centered over the horse, and still provide him enough freedom to comfortably negotiate the obstacle.

== Log fence ==
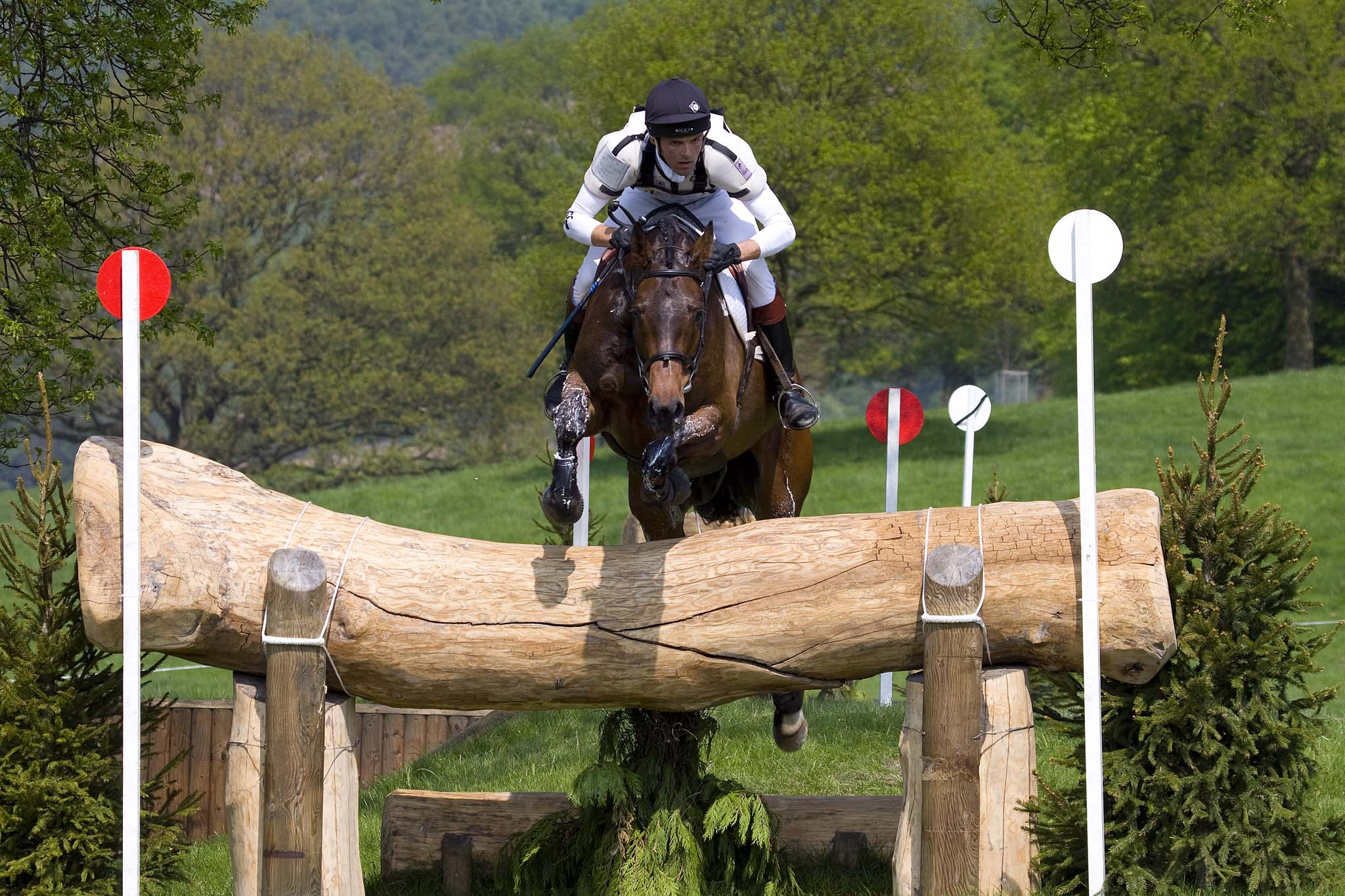
A log fence

Log fences are obstacles that are jumped in equestrian competition, including in the cross-country phase of eventing and in hunter paces. Additionally, they may be met when fox hunting. They are the most common type of cross-country fence, including oxers, log piles, vertical, and triple bar obstacles. The approach of these fences varies according to the height and width of the obstacle and the terrain.

Log fences differ from the usual equestrian jump, which involves removable poles set in jump cups that are attached to a standard, because they are solid and do not fall down. Therefore, the horse may touch the fence, and even scramble over it, without penalty.

However, the fact that they are solid increases the risk that horse and rider will be injured if they make a mistake: the horse may hit it so hard that the rider is launched from the saddle or the horse may stumble over it and fall on landing. In the worst-case scenario, a horse may hit the fence on his forearms, and somersault over it, which risks injury to the horse and especially the rider if the horse lands on him/her. Therefore, the rider must be especially proficient before attempting solid fences, to ensure he can approach them properly. Additionally, most riders get into a slightly more defensive seat when jumping log fences, and do not raise out of the saddle as high or fold as much, which will allow them to stay in the saddle if their horse accidentally hits the fences and stumbles on landing. This position is considered a fault when jumping show jumping fences, because the horse is always encouraged to bascule over the fence to help prevent him from touching and knocking the rails, and keeping the weight on his back encourages him to drop it instead. However, a slightly defensive position is not only acceptable when riding over solid obstacles, but in most cases ideal.

Horses will generally jump log fences quite well, as they look natural to the animal. It is best when designing and jumping such fences, however, to only ride over obstacles that have a larger log (rather than a thin, stick-like pole) as the horse will respect the jump and is more likely to jump it cleanly and boldly. Due to the risks, it is especially important to jump log fences in a forward manner with plenty of impulsion and good balance.

== Normandy bank ==
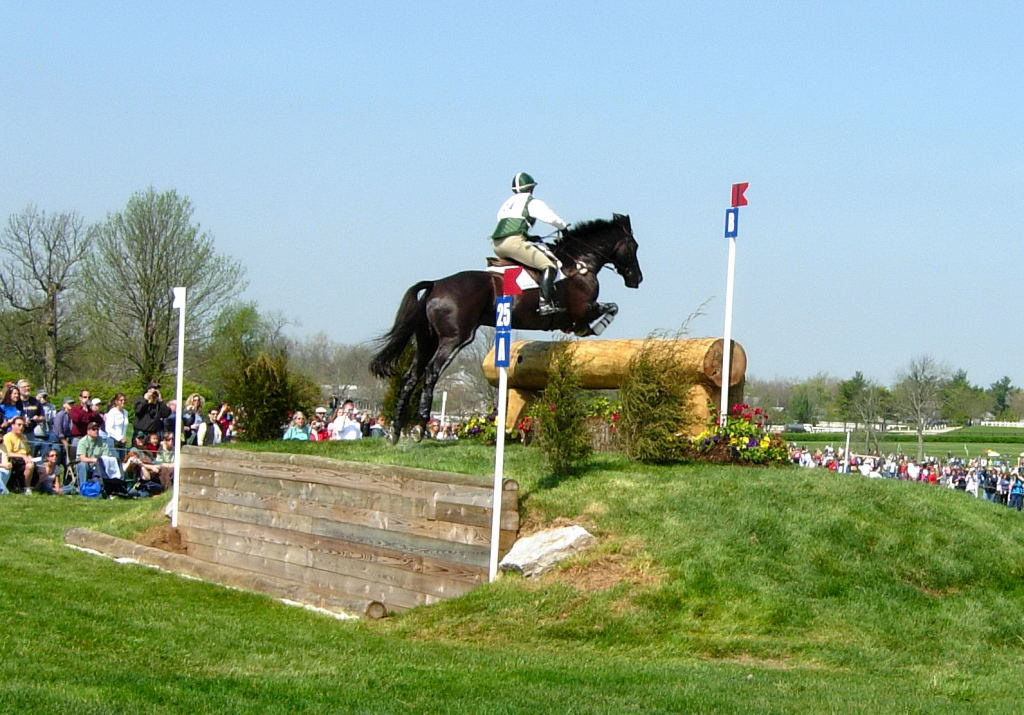
A Normandy bank involves a jump on, and a bounce over and off the bank.

A Normandy bank is a combination of obstacles. A ditch precedes the bank, so the horse must jump over the ditch and onto the bank in one leap. There is also a solid fence on the top of the bank, which may produce a drop fence to get off the obstacle, or may allow for a stride off.

Because this obstacle incorporates several different types of obstacles into one, it is considered quite difficult and is usually not seen until the upper levels. The rider not only has to worry about a bold jump over the ditch and onto the bank, but also the obstacle on the top of the bank and the quick jump off.

== Oxer ==
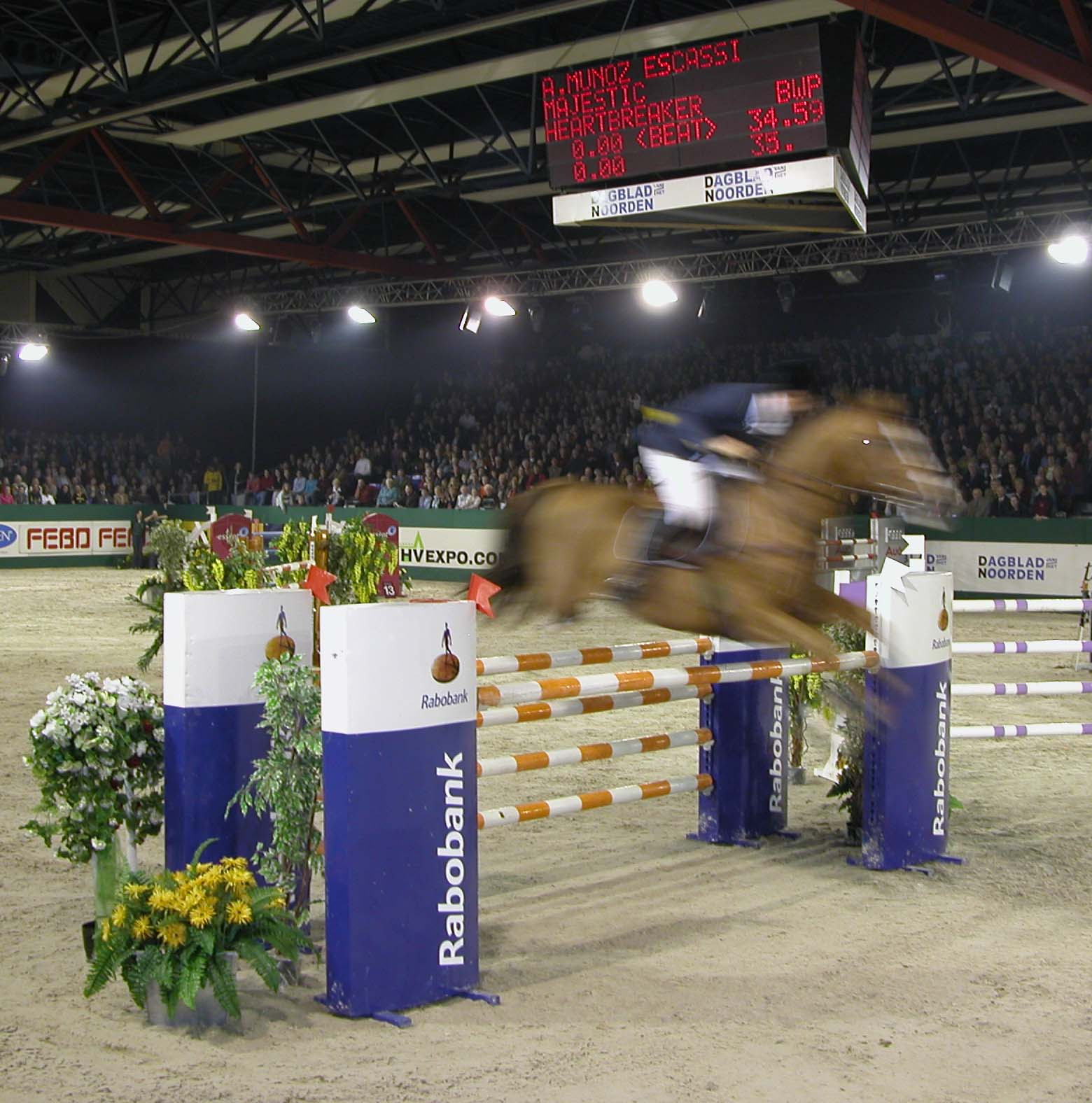
A parallel oxer – note the highest front and back rails are at the same height

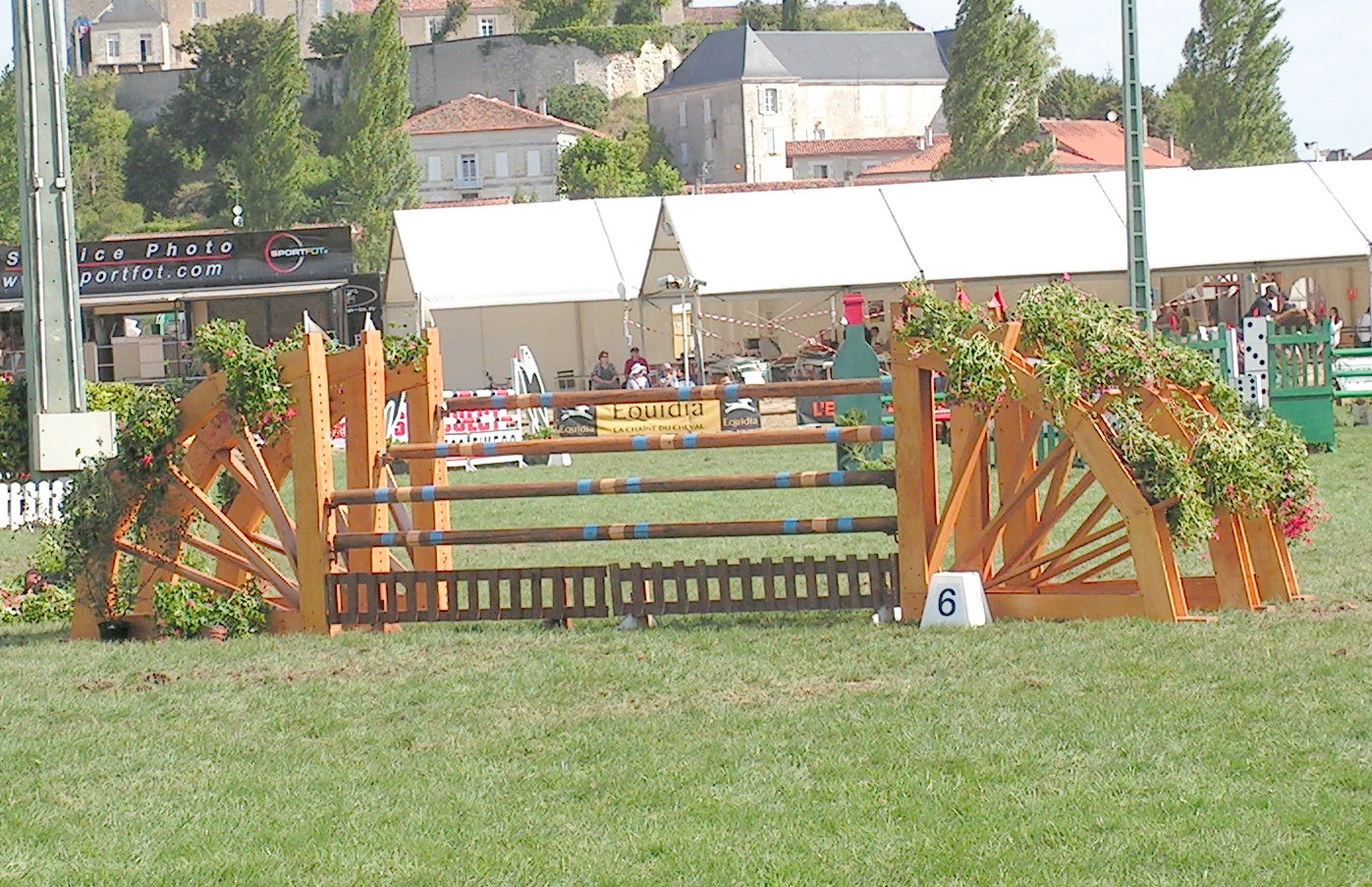
A triple bar

An oxer is a type of horse jump with two rails that may be set even or uneven. The width between the poles may vary. Some shows do not have oxers in the lower show jumping divisions.

There are several types of oxers:

- Ascending: the front rail is lower than the back rail. This is the easiest for the horse to jump, as it naturally fits into the animal's bascule and encourages a round and powerful jump.
- Descending: the back rail is lower than the front rail. This type is not often used, as it can cause an optical illusion for the horse. It is forbidden by the FEI because of the danger for the horse.
- Parallel: both the top front and back rail are even, but the jump is higher than it is wide.
- Square: a type of parallel oxer, where the jump's height is the same as its width. This is the hardest type of oxer seen in competition. It is seen in jumper but not hunter competition
- Swedish: a "cross-rail" type of oxer, the highest front and back rails of the oxer form an X when viewed head-on, so that one section of the jump is lower than the other sections.
- Triple Bar: similar to an ascending oxer, but rather than having two rails there are three, in graduating height. This is more difficult than an ascending oxer, however, because of the added width of the third rail.
- Hogsback: a type of oxer with three rails in which the tallest pole is in the center. Sometimes this kind of oxer is filled in to look like a barn or house, which is often used on cross country courses.

== Rolltop ==
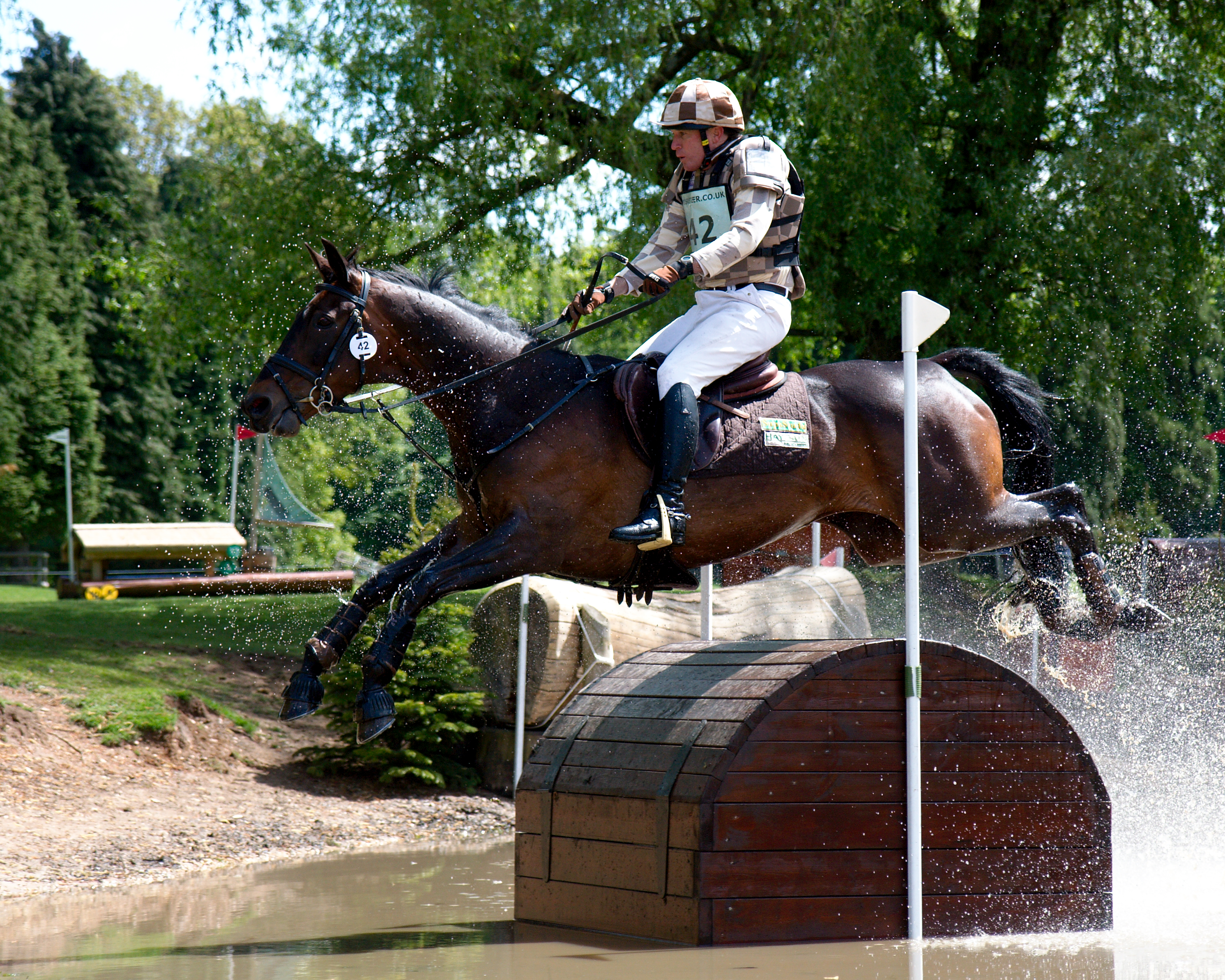
A rolltop fence

These jumps have a rounded half-barrel appearance on top. They can be quite wide at upper levels, and often govern respect from the horse, but are not usually considered a "scary" fence for horses on course and generally produce a good jump. A modified version of the rolltop is sometimes seen in hunter and show jumping classes.

== Shark's tooth ==
These fences have a top log rail, with an inverted triangle of logs pointing downwards, resembling a shark's top jaw.

== Skinny ==
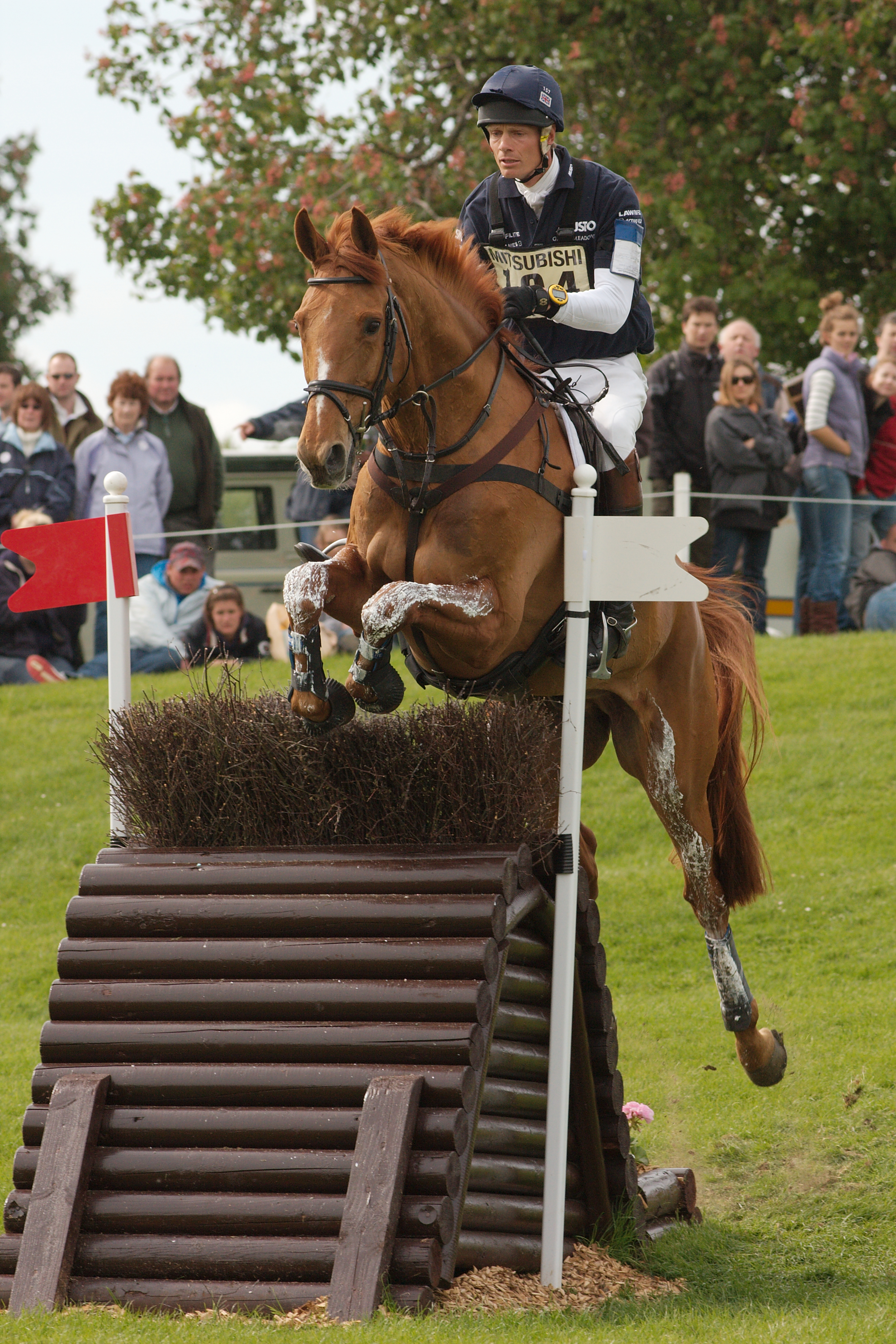
A "skinny" requires accurate riding.

A "skinny" is any fence with a narrow face. These require accurate riding and the ability to keep the horse straight, as it is easy for a horse to "glance off" such narrow obstacles. Combinations involving skinnies become increasingly common as the rider moves up the levels because they reduce the degree of error that is available if the rider is to successfully negotiate the fence.

== Sunken road ==
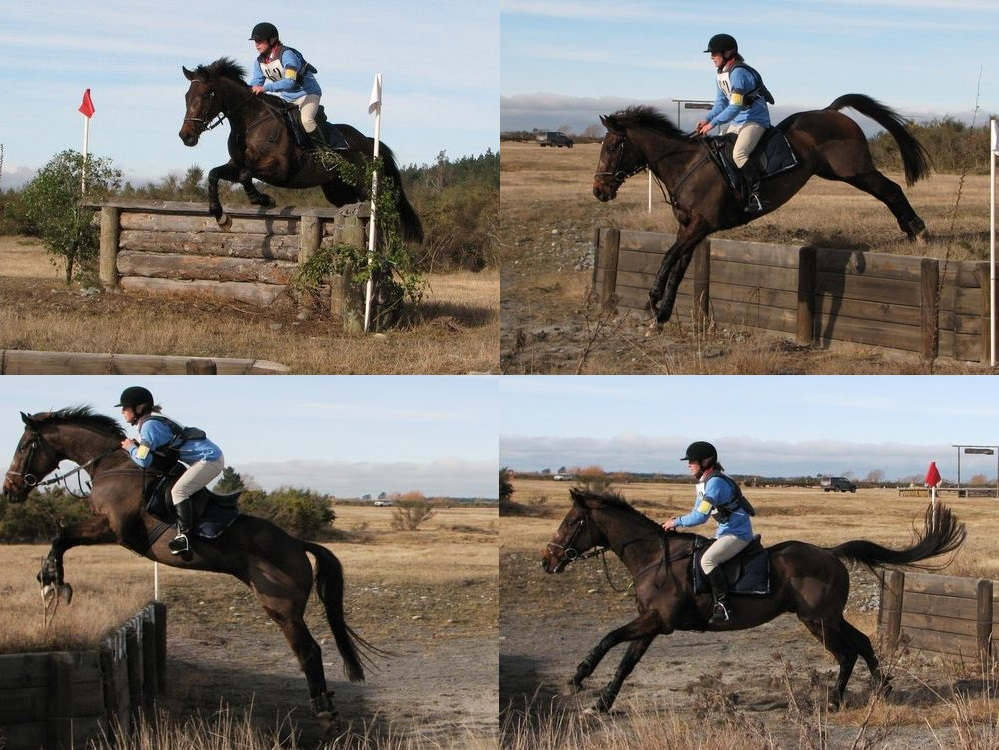
Clockwise from top left: a horse and rider making their way through a sunken road obstacle set.

These are combination jumps involving banks and rails. At the lower levels, it may consist of a bank down, with a few strides to a bank up. At the upper levels, the sunken road often is quite complicated, usually beginning with a set of rails, with either one stride or a bounce distance before the bank down, a stride in the "bottom" of the road before jumping the bank up, and another stride or bounce distance before the final set of rails. Sunken roads are very technical, especially at the upper levels, and require accurate riding. A bad approach or extravagant jump in can possibly ruin the rider's distances, which may result in a stop from the horse, or a fall. Additionally, the quick change in the type of obstacle, from upright fence, to down bank, to upbank, makes it physically difficult for rider and horse. It thus requires that both horse and rider are balanced, and that the rider stays centered and follows the motion of their mount.

== Table ==
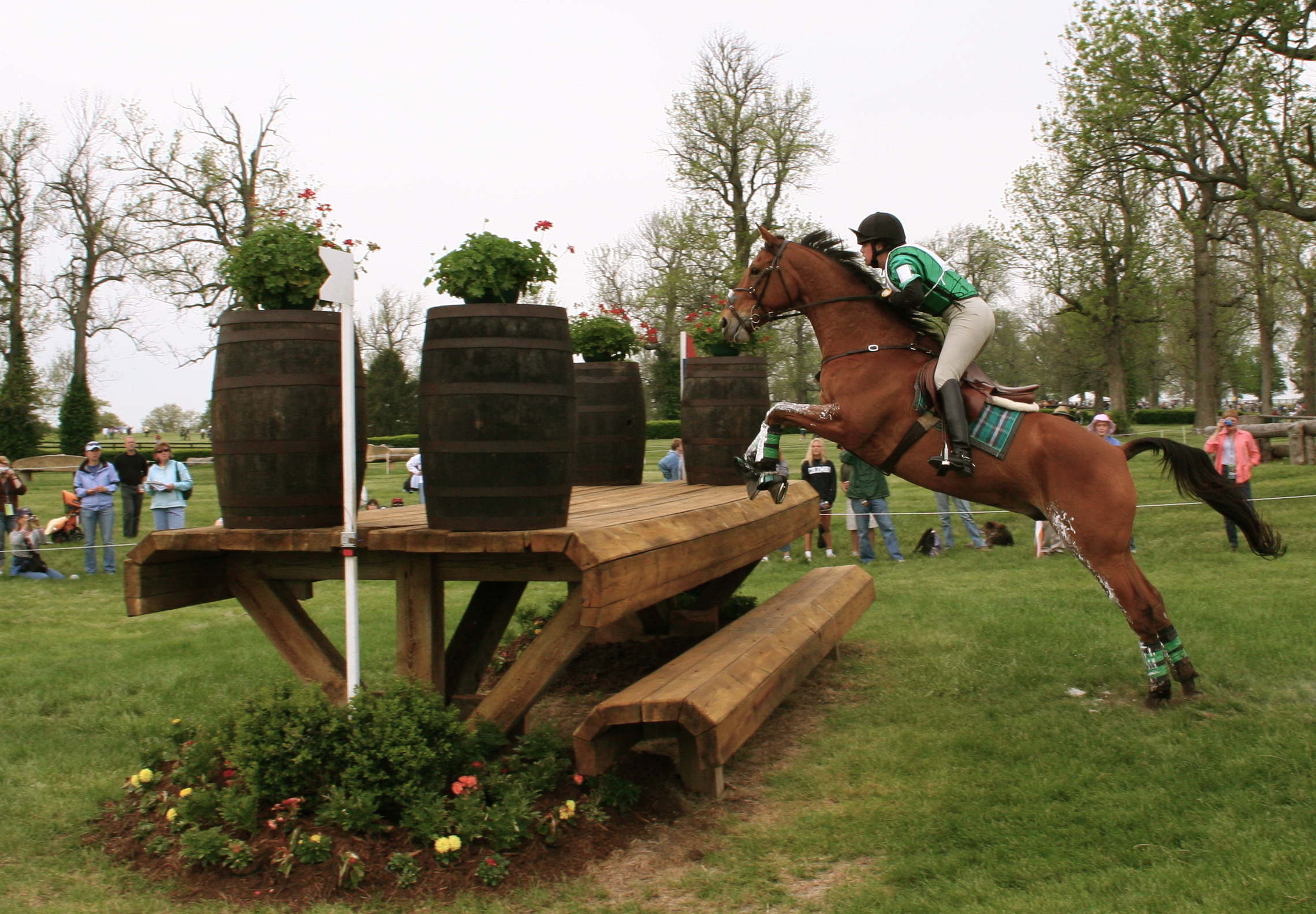
A large table

A table is a fence with height and width, with the top of the table being one piece of material (unlike an open oxer, which is not "filled in"). The horse is encouraged to jump over the entire obstacle at once, similar to an oxer, however there are times where the animal may accidentally touch down on, or "bank," the top. Because of this, tables should be built strongly enough to support the horse landing on it.

Tables are also usually built so that the back part is slightly higher than the front, or with a piece of wood at the back, so the horse can easily see that there is width to the obstacle and therefore judge it appropriately.

Tables can get extremely wide, and generally test the horse's scope. They are intended to be jumped at a forward pace and a slightly long stride.

== Trakehner ==
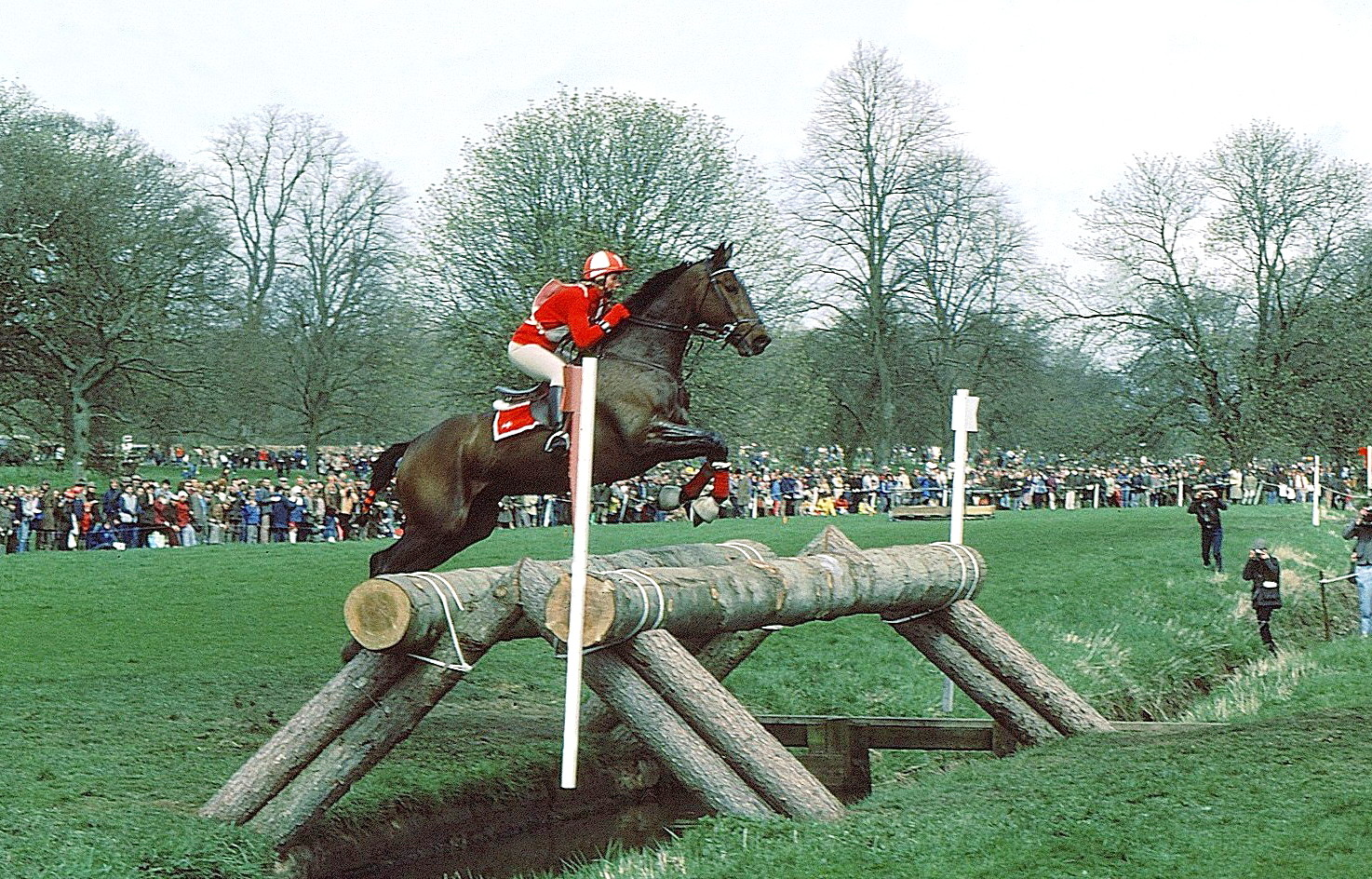
A trakehner

These fences consist of a rail over a ditch. The ditch can be frightening for the horse, and so this type of jump is a test of bravery. Trakehners are first seen at training level (United States), and at the higher levels they can be quite large. A Faux (False) Trakehner is a mobile cross-country jump designed to look like a trakehner by using heavy posts or poles on the ground to simulate the front and back edges of the ditch.

Trakehners were originally fencelines that were built in drainage ditches. The Trakehnen area of East Prussia, originally wetlands, was drained by the Prussian kings in the 17th and 18th centuries, before a horse breeding program was begun. The Main Stud Trakehnen, which produced the Trakehner breed of horse, was established on the land in 1732. The large drainage ditches, with fencelines in the bottom of them, were later used as a test for the 3-year-olds for suitability for breeding and war mounts. Due to the build of the fence, the take-off spot for the horse was on the downside of the ditch, and the landing was on the upside. However, the old-style trakehner jump is not seen today, mainly because the landing was on an uphill grade, was very punishing to the horses, even when the horse took off well. The ditch is now revetted and the fence does not have an uphill landing.

In 1973, Rachael Bayliss and her horse, Gurgle the Greek, "cleared" a trakehner at the Badminton Horse Trials by going under it. The rules were changed after this incident, requiring the horse not only to go between the flags but also to pass over the log.

== Wall ==
A wall jump may be solid with stone or made of painted wood blocks that will fall when a horse's leg or hoof hits it.

== Water crossing ==
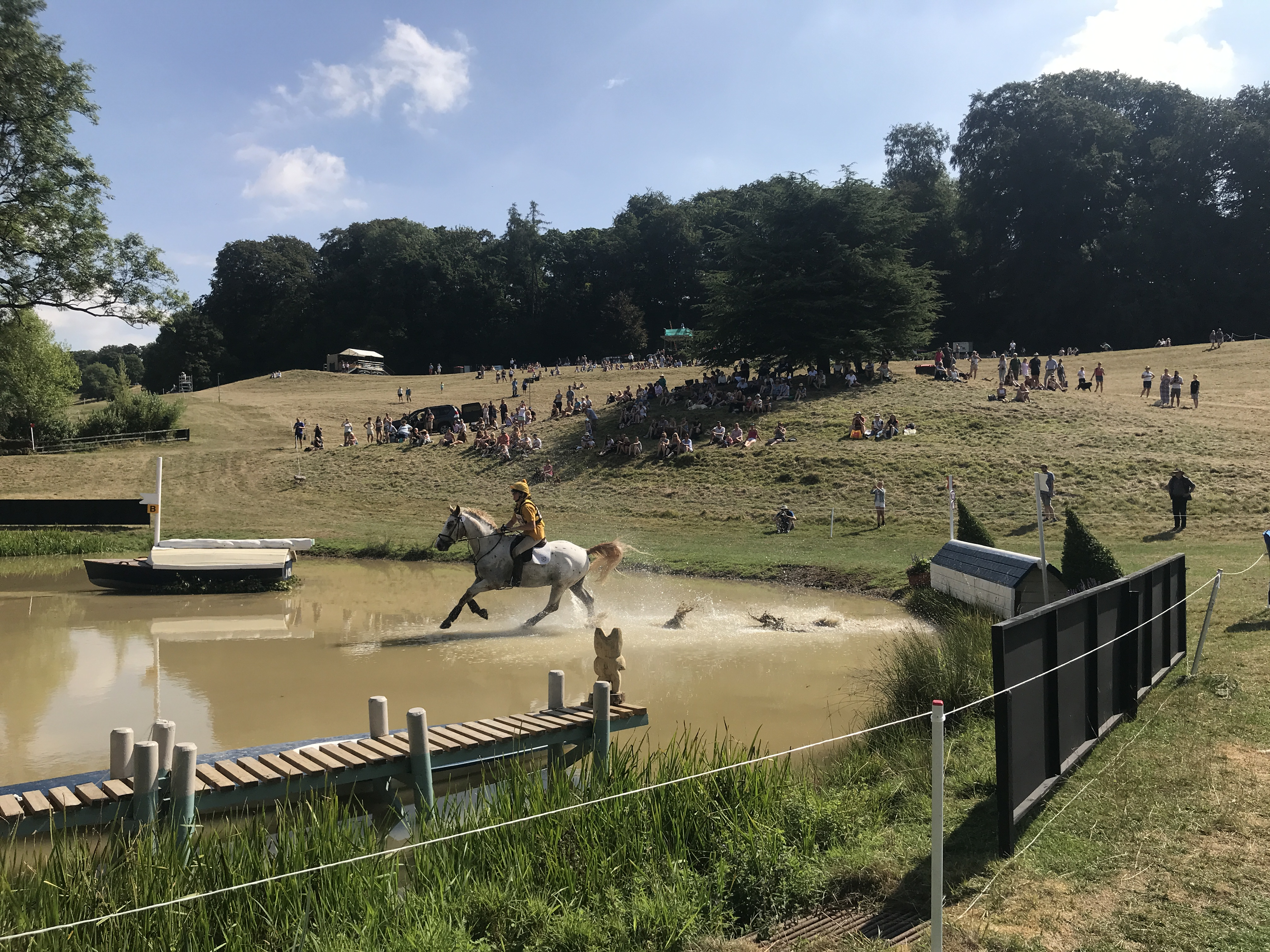
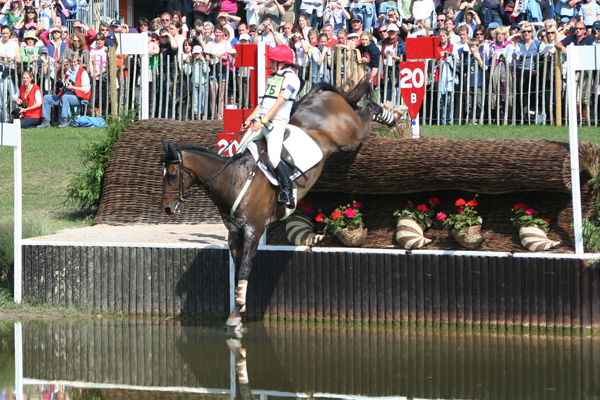
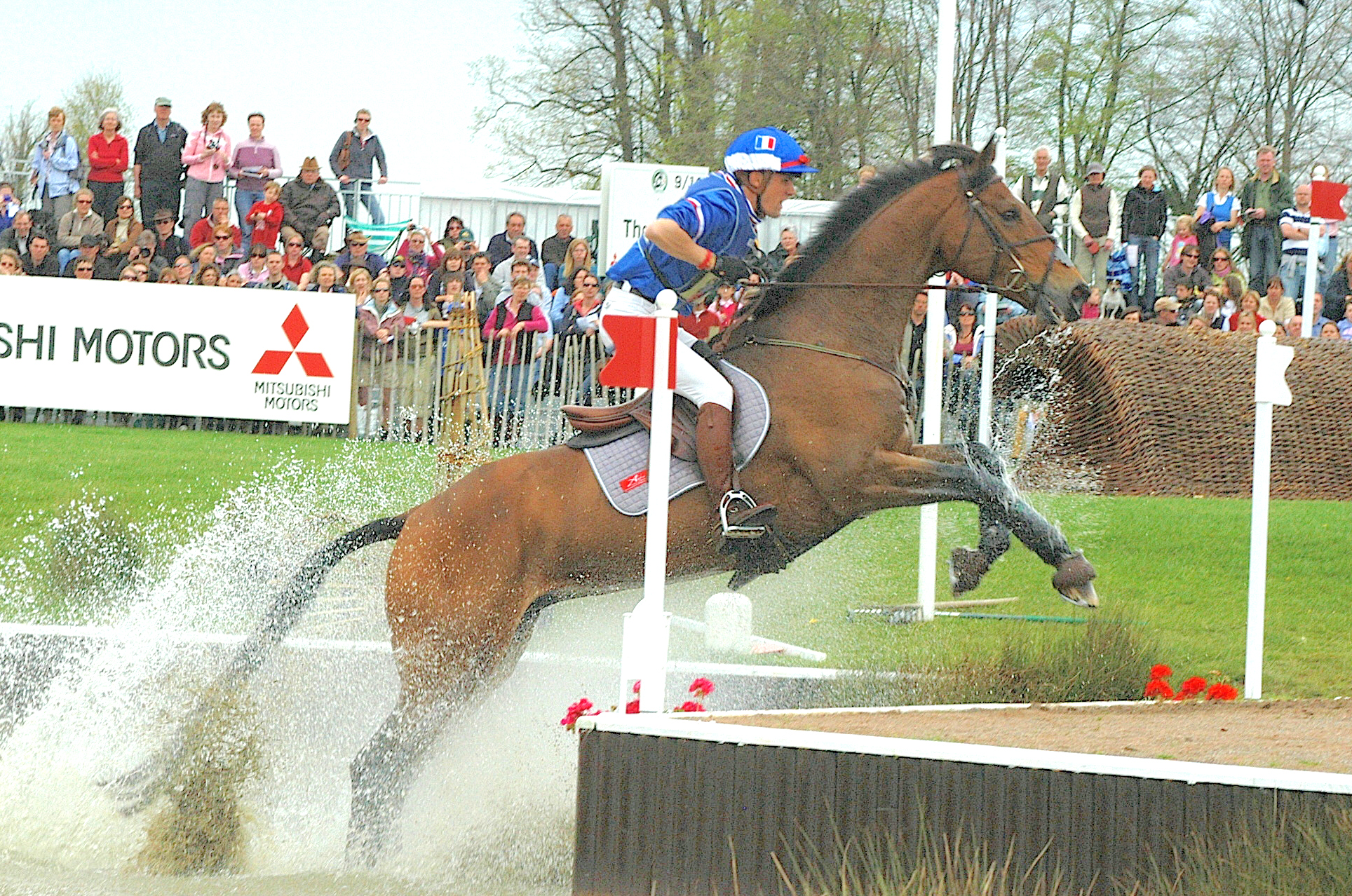
A water crossing usually involves jumping into and jumping out of water

These obstacles range in difficulty from simple water crossings at lower levels to combinations of drop fences into water, obstacles or "islands" within the water, and bank or obstacles out of the water at upper levels. The water may be no more than 14 inches deep.

Water, due to the drag it places on the horse, makes water obstacle rides different from those without the water. Drop fences in can cause the rider to come flying off on landing if he or she is not in a defensive position. The stride of the horse is shortened, which must be taken into account when designing and riding obstacles within the water. Fences within the water need to be ridden with a good deal of impulsion.

Additionally, some horses are cautious of water, and require a strong ride. Experience and confidence-building training can help to lessen any timidity from the horse.

The footing of the water complex should be firm and it is important for the competitor to walk into the water during the course walk to test the footing, depth of the water, and any drop-off areas in the complex.

Water crossings often include a bank or, at higher levels, a drop fence into the water. There may be a fence or a bank complex in the water, and a bank out, possibly to another fence. Water is often a challenge on the cross-country course, and there are usually several riders at the largest events who get "dunked" when they reach the obstacle.

== Water (show jumping) ==
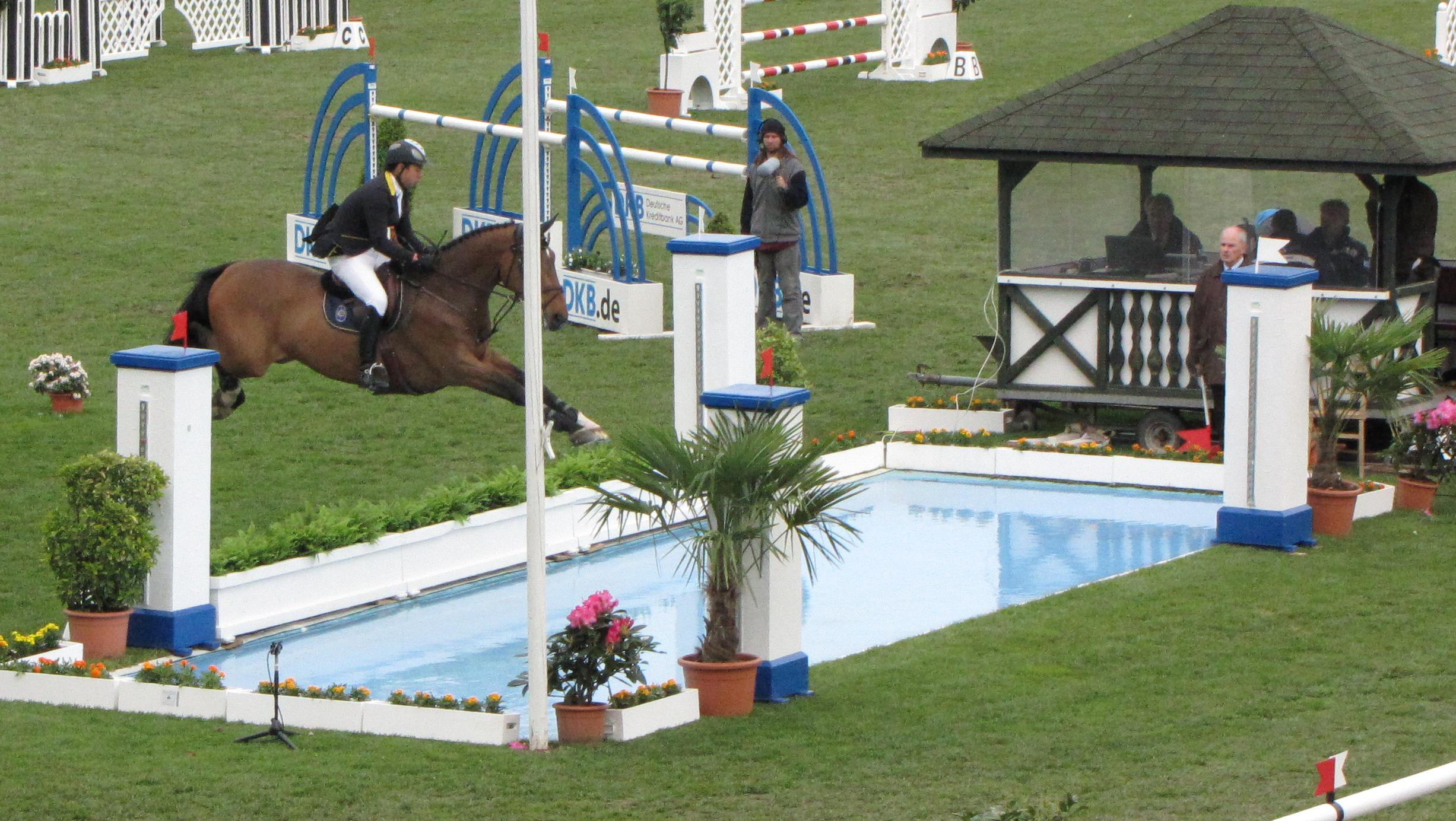
Open water

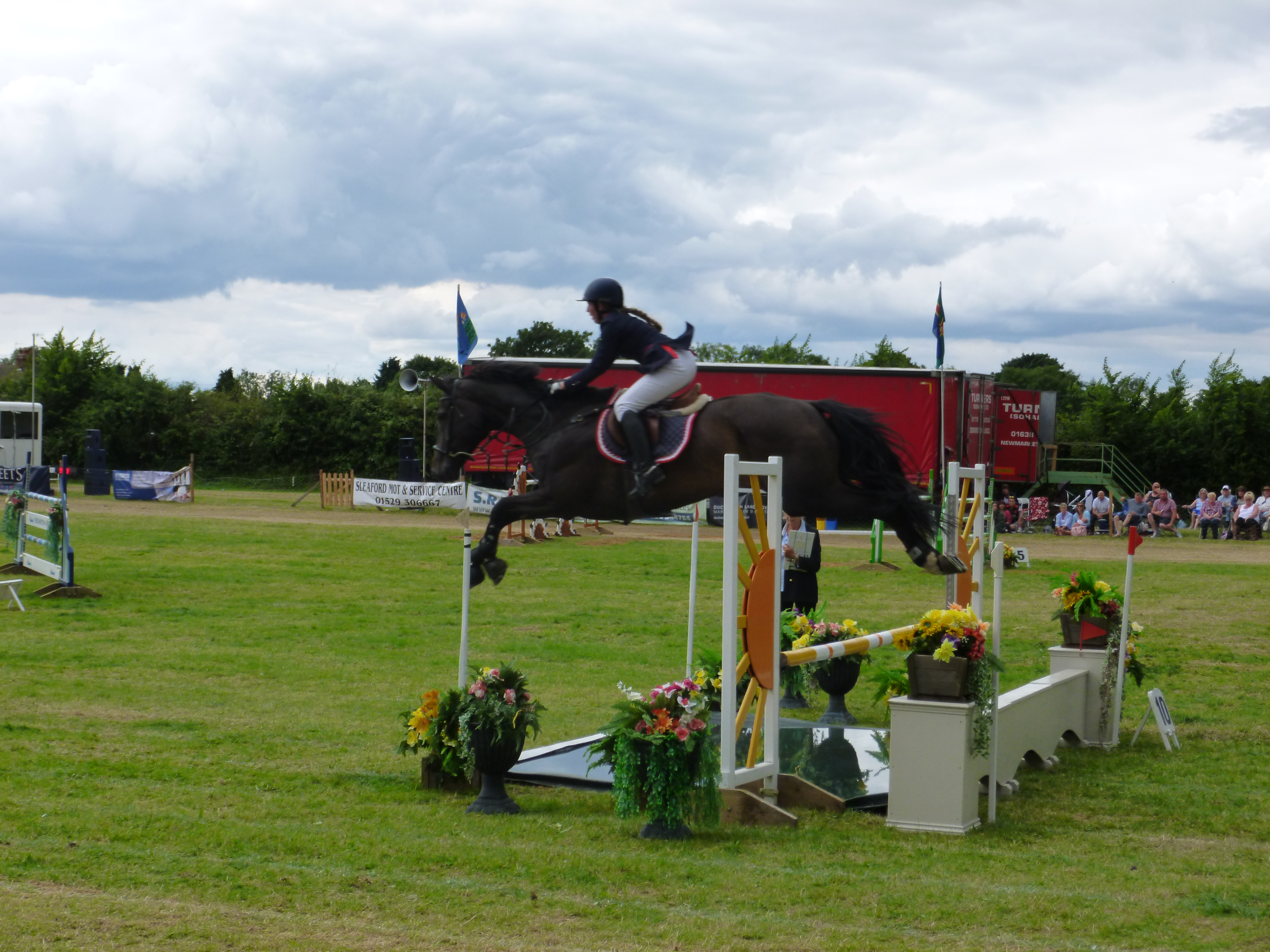
A show jump incorporating water

In show jumping, water is never meant to be run through but rather jumped over, and a foot in the water will count as a fault to the rider's score.

There are two types of water jumps used in show jumping:

- Open Water: a large, rectangular-shaped "ditch" of water, often with a small brush (18") or a rail on one side to act as a ground line. Water jumps are one of the widest obstacles a horse will be asked to jump, with a width up to 16 ft. They should be approached strongly, with a long stride, and the rider must judge the take-off to put the horse as deep (close) to the obstacle as possible, so that the jumping effort isn't increased. Should the rider cause the horse to take off too far back, it may be near impossible for him to clear the obstacle. However, the rider should also take care not to over-ride this fence, as it may unnerve the horse and make him very difficult to get back under control afterwards. Riders and horses need to keep eyes up and not look down. Water, although it can be spooky for a horse, is usually more daunting for the rider. Open water is not used in the stadium phase of eventing.
- Liverpool: a show jumping obstacle that takes the form of an oxer or vertical jump with a small pool of water underneath (although some liverpools may be "dry" and just consist of a blue or black tarp). These fences tend to make the horse look down, so the horse does not focus on the actual rails it must jump and may hit the fence. Riders and horses need to keep eyes up and focused on the actual fence they must jump. Liverpools may also be found in the stadium phase of eventing.

== See also ==
- Jumping (horse)
- Cavaletti
- Bascule
