= Show hunter =

Type of competition horse

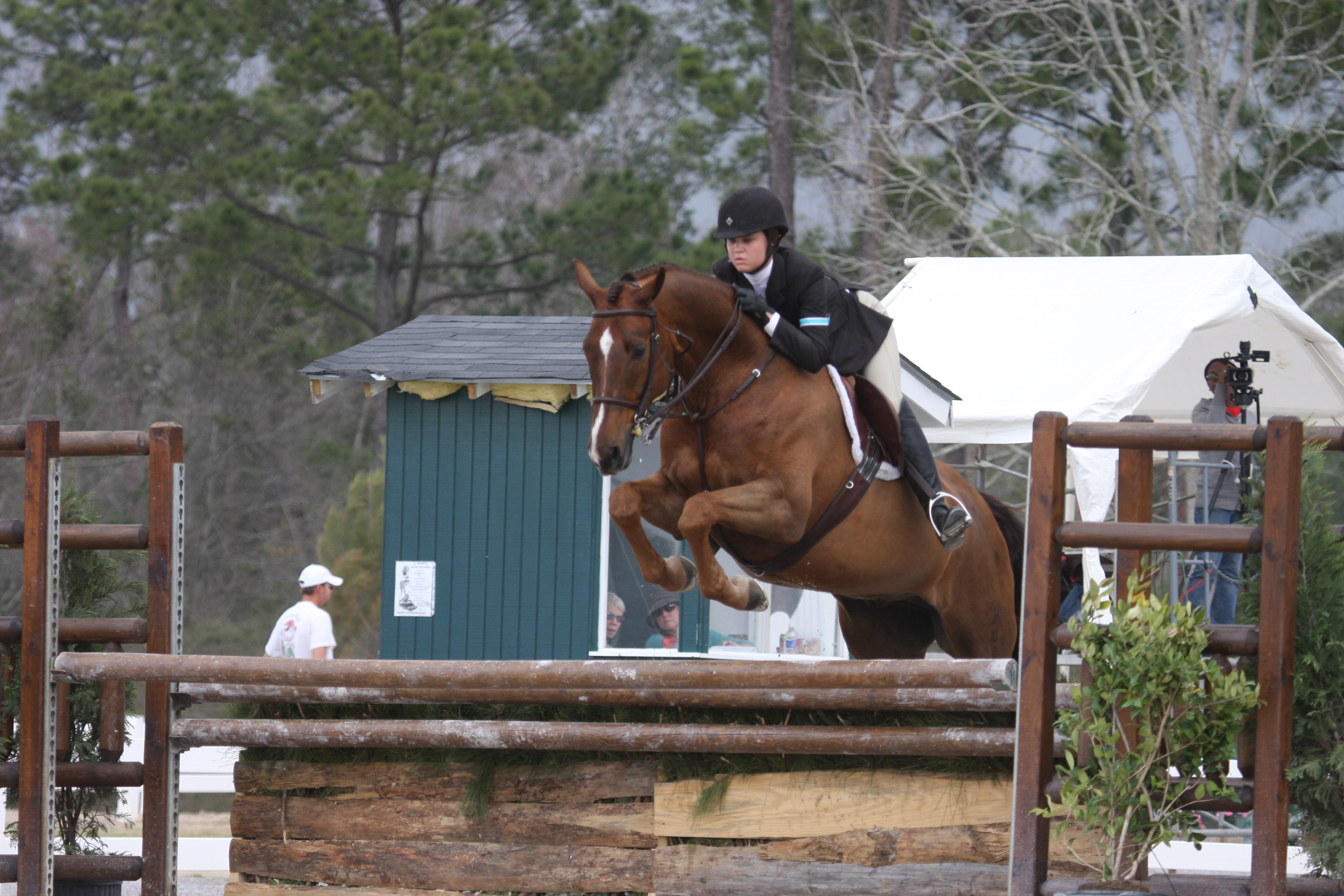
A hunter showing good form over fences, with tight legs and proper bascule.

The Hunter division is a branch of horse show competition that is judged on the horse's performance, soundness and when indicated, conformation, suitability or manners. A "show hunter" is a horse that competes in this division.

Show hunters, ideally, show many qualities that were rewarded in the fox hunting field such as manners, fluid movement, and correct jumping style. They are shown in hunt seat style tack. Any breed can be exhibited, but at the highest levels they are usually of Warmblood or Thoroughbred type, though a hunter-style pony is also seen in youth classes. Some classes are restricted to horses of certain breeds or height.

In the United States, show hunters are primarily exhibited over fences in various divisions, including Green Hunter, Working Hunter, Conformation Hunter and so on, with a few additional classes offered for horses shown in-hand or on the flat, known as "Hunter Under Saddle." In the United Kingdom, competition over fences is called "Working Hunter," and the term "Show Hunter" describes classes held on the flat. Whilst there are similarities between the American and British classes, there are differences in scoring, attire and type.

== Movement and frame ==
The show hunter should have a balanced frame, where they are 'round' in their top line and 'on the bit' softly. They should have a long, sweeping step that covers maximum ground per minimum effort, and have a rhythmic, 12' stride at the canter. Ideally, the majority of the movement occurs from the horse's shoulder and hip, and there is minimal flexion in the horse's joints.

The frame of the show hunter differs from that of dressage horses, eventers, and show jumpers, as it travels in a long and low frame, with its head moderately extended. Its frame is more "stretched out" than horses competing in dressage, eventing, or show jumping, but the horse should not be on its forehand. The riders of show hunters often ride on a slightly looser rein than seen elsewhere to facilitate this type of movement, and the horse carries its head just in front of the vertical. The show hunter should be mannerly and have the appearance of being a pleasure to ride.

Although the horse is in a long and low frame, it should still be able to collect its stride when asked. The horse must also be proficient at lengthening its canter stride while still maintaining its tempo and rhythm.

The walk of the show hunter is free and ground-covering; the trot should be balanced and flowing. The canter should be moderately collected. The horse should have a long galloping stride (12 feet is the expected length), but it should still be balanced and rhythmic.

== Jumping form ==
A good show hunter must possess an excellent jumping form. A hunter round should be ridden in an even, balanced, forward pace as though following a hound. The forearm should be parallel or higher with the ground when jumping, and the knees and lower legs should be even. The horse should not be lazy with its lower legs, but should tuck them under its forearm as it clears the fence, clearly bending its fetlocks and knees. The horse should stay straight over the fence. A show hunter should have a good bascule, or roundness over a jump. This is often described as the horse taking the shape of a dolphin jumping out of the water, with the horse's back rounded, and its head reaching forward and down over the fence.

== Turnout ==
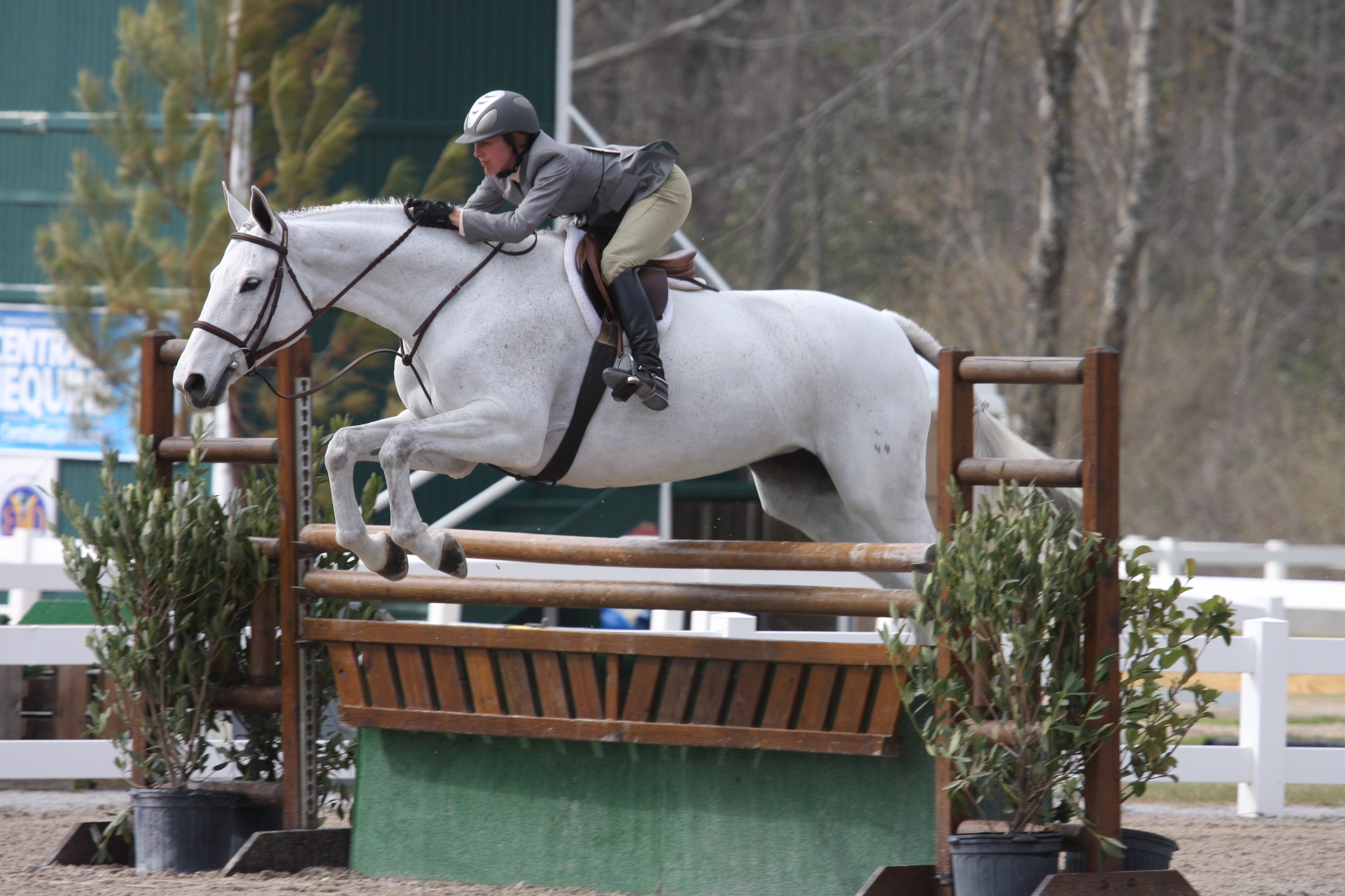
Typical turn-out for a show hunter and its rider

Show hunters are well groomed for show, clean with a shiny coat. The horse is to be bathed before the competition, with special attention paid to white markings. Depending on the level of show, show hunters may need to have their manes and forelocks braided or plaited. Horses are to be braided on the right side of the neck for hunters, using yarn or thread that matches the color of the mane. Braids are to be small, neat, and tight. Lower level shows do not require braiding, however higher rated shows frown upon unbraided horses and might penalize for informality. Hunters sometimes are exhibited with a braided tail as well. The horses' hooves are usually polished before they enter the show ring.

The show hunter's hair is often clipped prior to a show. In the US, this includes the whiskers around the muzzle, the hair in and around the ears, the bridle path, and lower jaw. The legs are also trimmed, removing all fetlock hair and feathering, and trimming the pasterns and coronet. In the winter, show hunters are often given a full clip, removing all the body hair, to give them a neater appearance in the show ring.

Tails are not pulled at the dock, so that it may be braided, and the bottom of the tail is left natural in US competition, not trimmed. In the UK it is common to cut the bottom of the tail straight across. The tail is braided from the top down to the end of the tail bone, with the rest of the tail left loose.

== The course ==
The course of fences a show hunter must jump is usually made up of 8-12 obstacles and must be set at the required height for each division. Obstacles must simulate those found in the hunting field such as natural post and rail, brush, stone wall, white board fence or gate, chicken coop, aiken, hedge, oxer, and so on. The fences in hunters are not brightly colored as in show jumping, instead they are natural rails or painted natural colors such as brown, green, white, and beige. Open water jumps and liverpools, common obstacles in show jumping arena, are not used in a show hunter course. Although combination fences may be seen, they are usually only two elements, and have easier distances between them than those found in show jumping. Banks and ditches are not found on the show hunter course, nor are any major changes in terrain, and often the horses jump on level footing in an enclosed arena.

The distance between fences is usually a set number of strides, with each stride 12 feet in length. Unlike a show jumper, the show hunter does not need to go to extreme lengths to collect or extend its stride to meet the distances correctly. The horse must put a certain amount of strides between each set of fences if they are in a line. If the horse and rider don't do this, points will be taken off the overall score.

The show hunter should maintain a good pace throughout the course of fences, but keep an even rhythm, neither speeding up nor slowing down. The horse is judged on its smoothness around the course, its movement, jumping form, and whether it reaches each "spot", or the distance of takeoff in front of a jump, correctly. A poor spot would put the horse too close or too far back from the jump, so that it would either have to stretch and make a great effort over the fence, or have to jump more "up and down" rather than over the fence. A poor spot interrupts the rhythm of a course, and increases the likelihood that a horse will rub or drop a rail.

A good ride over fences will look easy, with the horse jumping from the correct takeoff spot, easily fitting the strides in between the jumps (as opposed to having to really stretch out or collect its stride), and cleanly making the flying changes required. Refusals, knocked rails, or rubs over fences incur a severe drop (faults) in the rider's score.

== Competition ==
A typical class consists of jumping over natural fences mimicking those seen on a hunt field, usually ridden at a controlled hand gallop.

Some classes include a conformation section where the saddle is removed and the horse is asked to walk and trot in front of the judge to evaluate conformation and soundness. Where classes are restricted by breed, the breed standard is taken into account and horses are not marked down for exhibiting movement that is a breed characteristic.

A high scoring hunter in open competition maintains an even stride over courses based on an average 12 feet (3.7 m) stride length. The hunter remains smooth and balanced around the corners and between the jumps. They will look relaxed and seem to float effortlessly around the courses, meeting all of their fences at an ideal takeoff distance.

=== Faults ===
==== Minor to major faults ====
1. Rubbing the jump
2. Swapping leads in a line or in front of a jump
3. Late lead changes
4. Freshness
5. Spooking
6. Kicking up or out
7. Jumping out of form
8. Jumping off the center line of jump
9. Bucking and/or playing
10. Adding a stride in a line with a related distance
11. Eliminating a stride in a line with a related distance
12. Striking off on a wrong lead on the courtesy circle. (May be corrected with either a simple or flying change of lead)
13. Bucking or refusing to jump.

==== Major faults. ====
1. Knockdown
2. Refusal or disobedience
3. Stopping for loss of shoe or broken equipment
4. Refusal or stopping while on course
5. Dangerous jumping
6. Addressing a jump - coming to a stop in front of a jump in order to show the jump to the horse.
7. Completely missing a lead change
8. Adding or eliminating a stride in an in and out.
9. Breaking stride, or Trotting while on course. Exceptions: As posted on the course diagram (i.e. trot jumps, steep banks, etc.); as outlined above in HU135.1l; and striking off on a wrong lead on the courtesy circle.
10. Bad take off spot
11. Disunited lead (cross cantering)

==== Faults that constitute elimination. ====
1. Three refusals
2. Off course
3. Jumping course before it is reset
4. Bolting from the ring
5. Fall of horse and/or rider (rider shall not remount in the ring).

== Comparison with field hunter ==
Although the qualities of the show hunter are based on those of the field hunter, the modern show horse is somewhat different from its counterpart in the field. Show hunters prioritize perfection whereas field hunters reward efficiency and durability.

A show hunter is supposed to make its movements look effortless; and maintain a long, low, ground-covering stride with a swinging shoulder, and a low head and neck set. They are expected to never stop at a fence, cause a knockdown or a rub, and take every fence in good form and hitting every planned stride in between While these characteristics are important for a field hunter, as a knockdown or a rub could result in a fall for the rider, the way of going is not as important for the field hunter as for the show hunter. The show hunter typically takes the fences at a far slower pace than the field hunter, and in far more controlled conditions. Hunters showing at indoor shows compete on flat, even surfaces over specified "natural type" fences such as coops, post and rails, hanging gates, brush, roll-backs, faux stone and brick walls, and natural-colored rails. Hunters competing at outdoor shows may or may not compete on even surfaces, however even when competing on an outdoor grass course with a couple of rolling surfaces, they still don't have to worry about navigating holes, rocks trees, lumpy cornfields, macadam road surfaces, and the like, which means that their hardiness is not generally tested at the show.

The field hunter's primary requirements have more to do with ability than with looks; therefore he may be any type of horse or pony which can get the job done, safely and competently for his rider. They must be able to keep up with the field, negotiate any type of terrain or footing competently, and be agile and competent white doing it. He is expected to "stand" at "check" (while hounds are working), or for his rider to re-mount him when necessary, never to kick a hound or another horse, and to be under complete control at all times. He should be steady, tough and robust, and able to withstand the inevitable knocks, bumps, bruises, minor injuries, and sometimes falls which happen in the hunt field. Field hunters must have the ability of "staying sane" at all times in the high excitement in a crush of galloping horses, and he should have brakes whenever he is called on, to stop quickly. It also helps if he happens to be good-natured, and enjoys his job. He needs a good sound foot, strong legs, and an amenable brain. Riding safely at speed, the ability to stay under control, and attitude all play a vital role for the field hunter. The type of fences he could encounter in the field run from low stone walls to brush, to coops in fence lines to rail fences, logs, railroad timber obstacles, and other "natural boundaries" found in hunting territories. It matters not whether he looks like a peacock or a plow horse, so long as he can do the job, do it well, and bring his rider safely home at the end of the day.

== Classes and divisions ==
Show hunter competition at a horse show consists of multiple classes of different types grouped into divisions, usually based on the experience or age of the rider or horse, or the height of the animal. In all classes except equitation, the horse is judged on performance and soundness, and usually also on conformation, suitability and manners.

=== Types of classes ===
- Flat – Sometimes also called "hunter under saddle" or "hack" classes. These are group classes where all the competitors entered are judged in the ring at the same time. Required gaits are the walk, trot, and canter. Some classes will also occasionally ask for a counter canter or a hand gallop. At the end of the class the competitors line up in the middle of the ring and awards are given.
- Hunter – Sometimes called "hunter over fences" or "working hunter" classes. Horses in hunter classes are shown one at a time over a course of jumps. The horse and rider are generally expected to enter the ring at the trot and make a large circle for about a third or one half of the ring before cantering to the course of 8-12 obstacles. After the course has been completed, they are also expected to complete another circle of similar size at the trot before leaving the arena.
- Equitation – The rider is judged on riding ability and form, and though the performance of the horse is not specifically judged, it is nonetheless considered to reflect the rider's ability. Both flat and over fences classes are offered.
- Leadline – This division is for the least experienced of riders, where the rider is led by a person on the ground. It may include walk, trot, and very low fences (less than 12 inches). It is not commonly seen at USEF approved or "official" shows.
- "Handy" classes – A hunter class that combines elements of flat and over-fences classes, often with elements reminiscent of field hunting. For example; in addition to jumping a course, the rider may be asked to open and close a gate or to dismount and lead the horse over a small fence.
- Conformation Hunter — a hunter class where the horse is also unsaddled and evaluated for conformation as well as general soundness.
- Model, or in-hand classes – The horse is judged on conformation and movement suitable for that of a hunter. Horses are only led in these classes, not ridden, and the horse is presented for judging without a saddle.
- Hunter Derby - Hunter derbies are a two round over fences class, with the winner receiving a neck ribbon and money prize. The courses are reminiscent of the hunt field with gates, bush jumps, flower boxes, logs, and stone walls. The top scoring riders get called back for the second round, that is often more challenging and technical. In either rounds, the course might offer the choice of a 'high' and 'low' height option, with the oppurtinity for more points if you chose to go for the higher option.

==== Divisions ====
- Pony – Classes for horses not exceeding 14.2 hands (58 inches, 147 cm) in the US, 14 hands (56 inches, 142 cm) in Australia, or in FEI competition, 143 centimetres (56 in). There are usually 3 divisions for ponies - small (ponies less than 12.2 hands), medium (ponies between 12.2 and 13.2 hands), and large (ponies between 13.3 and 14.2 hands). The courses for each division differ by the height of the obstacles and distance between obstacles, which is based on the pony's average stride size.
- Adult Amateur – This is a division for Adults (18 years and over) who are not professionals, which means that they do not participate in any professional activities surrounding their riding.
- Junior and Children – This is a division for riders who are under 18.
- Regular – This division is open to any horse.
- Green – This is a division for inexperienced, usually young horses in their first or second year of competition in classes where national specifications require horses to jump fences at 3'6" or higher. In smaller local or regional shows that do not seek approval of the USEF, qualifications may be more lenient.
- "Breed" classes are restricted to a single breed or breed group of horse or pony, sometimes with additional conformation judging to the breed standard.

== See also ==
- Hunt seat
- Equitation
- English riding
