= Jump seat (disambiguation) =

The term jump seat may refer to:

- Jump seat in aircraft
- Jumpseat (satellite)
- Jumping position, or two-point position in hunt seat English-style horse riding

== See also ==
- Deadheading (employee), the transportation company practice of carrying off-duty employees to work locations free of charge, often using a jump seat
