= Lead line =

Lead line ("Leed" line) may refer to:

- Leadline, a horse show class for children
- Lead (tack), for leading livestock
- Leash, for dogs and other small animals

And also to ("Led" line):

- Burton line, a symptom of lead poisoning
- Sounding line, an instrument used in navigation to measure water depth (the plummet, or weight, is usually composed of lead)
- Radiation shielding: "lead-lined" containers for shielding radiation
