= Federico Caprilli =

Italian soldier (1868-1907)

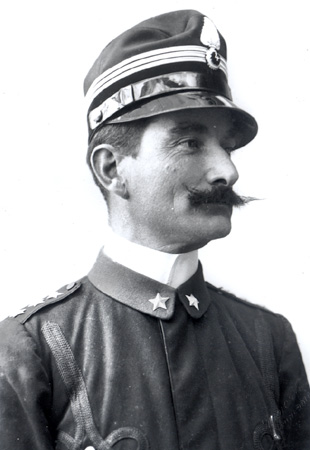
Prior to 1907

Captain Federico Caprilli (8 April 1868 - 6 December 1907) was an Italian cavalry officer and equestrian who revolutionized the jumping seat. His position, now called the "forward seat," formed the modern-day technique used by all jumping riders today.

== Early life ==
Caprilli was born in Livorno, Italy. He entered the Military School of Modena in 1886, before being assigned as a Second Lieutenant to the cavalry regiment of Piedmont Royal in Pinerolo.

== The old jumping seat ==
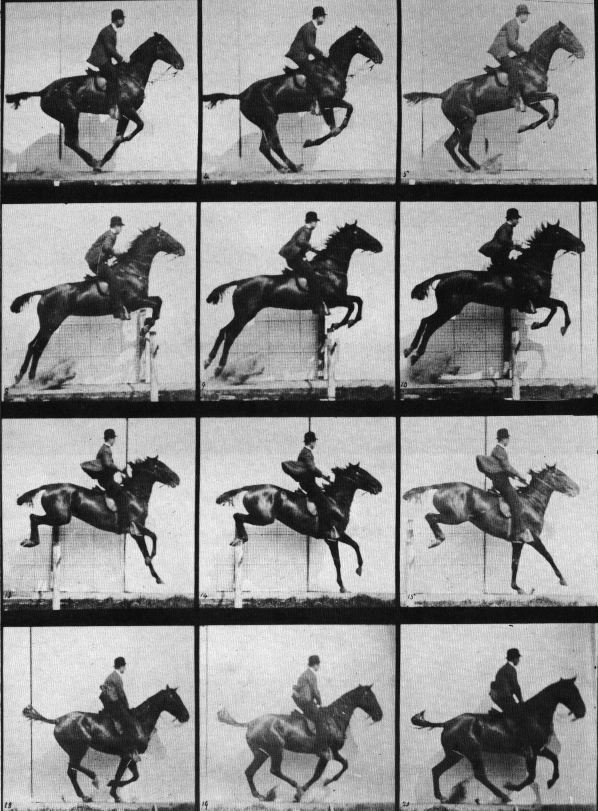
The old jumping seat: leaning back to "save" the horse's legs. Note the horse's inverted frame and poor technique.

The old jumping seat involved the rider using long stirrups, keeping his legs pushed out in front of him, and his body leaning back, pulling the reins, as the horse took the fence. This position was adopted because it used to be believed that the hindquarters and hocks were more flexible and better shock absorbers than the fragile front legs. By leaning back and pulling the horse's head up, the riders tried to encourage the horse to land hind legs first (or at least with all four legs), to decrease the impact on the front legs.

This position had serious problems, first and foremost because the horse was uncomfortable being hit in the mouth over every obstacle. The position also kept the rider's weight directly on the back of the horse, and pushed the rider behind the motion, sending his center of gravity behind the horse's. The weight on the horse's back, in addition to the upward pull on the head, made it impossible for the horse to round up in a natural bascule over the fence. The rider therefore interfered with the horse's jumping movement, making it more difficult (and sometimes painful) for the animal to clear the obstacle, and made many horses sour to jumping.

== Caprilli's technique ==
Caprilli examined horses free jumping (without tack or rider), using photographs to document their shape over fences, and found that they always landed on their forelegs. He then developed his theory on the position the rider should take while over a fence: one that would not interfere with the horse's jumping movement and most importantly one that would not touch the horse's mouth. Caprilli also wanted to train a horse that could think for itself, without needing the rider's guidance, and did not like "spot" jumping, where the rider tried to add in or lengthen the stride of the horse before the fence.

The horse was allowed to lengthen its stride, instead of approaching the fence in a very collect, stiff manner. The rider was positioned more forward at all times, including on the flat, so that his body mirrored the more lengthened frame of the horse, and the stirrup was shortened so that the seat could easily hover above the saddle, with the thigh and lower leg providing the rider with support. Over the fence, the rider kept his seat out of the saddle, leaned slightly forward, and allowed his hands to follow the horse's mouth forward. His center of gravity was placed directly over the horse's, making the job of jumping as easy as possible. On landing, the rider remained slightly forward, instead of inclining backward as in the old seat. This position was held not only over fixed, upright obstacles, but up and down banks and over ditches.

== Implications ==
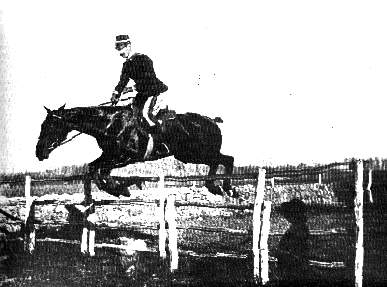
Captain Caprilli jumping in Italy

Caprilli's position made horses much more willing to jump obstacles, now that they were free of interference. However, his "rebellion" against the "classic" position earned him the hostility of the Italian Royal Army establishment, so that when rumours of his turbulent sentimental life with women of the high aristocracy spread out, he was transferred to a cavalry regiment in southern Italy where he nonetheless continued his experimentations with great success in equestrian competitions. As a consequence, the General Inspector of the Cavalry, H.R.H. the Count of Turin, and the Commander of the Cavalry School of Pinerolo, soon realised the genius and the value of Caprilli's methods and called him as chief instructor at the Cavalry School of Pinerolo as well as its subsidiary in Tor di Quinto. After a year of training, members of the schools had made great progress. The horses became so willing that riders completed the training course without reins.

Due to such developments, the Italian cavalry began to dominate international competition, and riders came from countries around the world to study Caprilli's system. The style spread worldwide, helped by the fact that Caprilli demonstrated at the 1906 Olympic Games.

Caprilli died in Turin, Italy in 1907, after inexplicably losing consciousness while riding at pass a horse he was testing, thus falling and hitting his head on the sharp edge of the footpath.
