= Jumping position =

Rider position for horse jumping

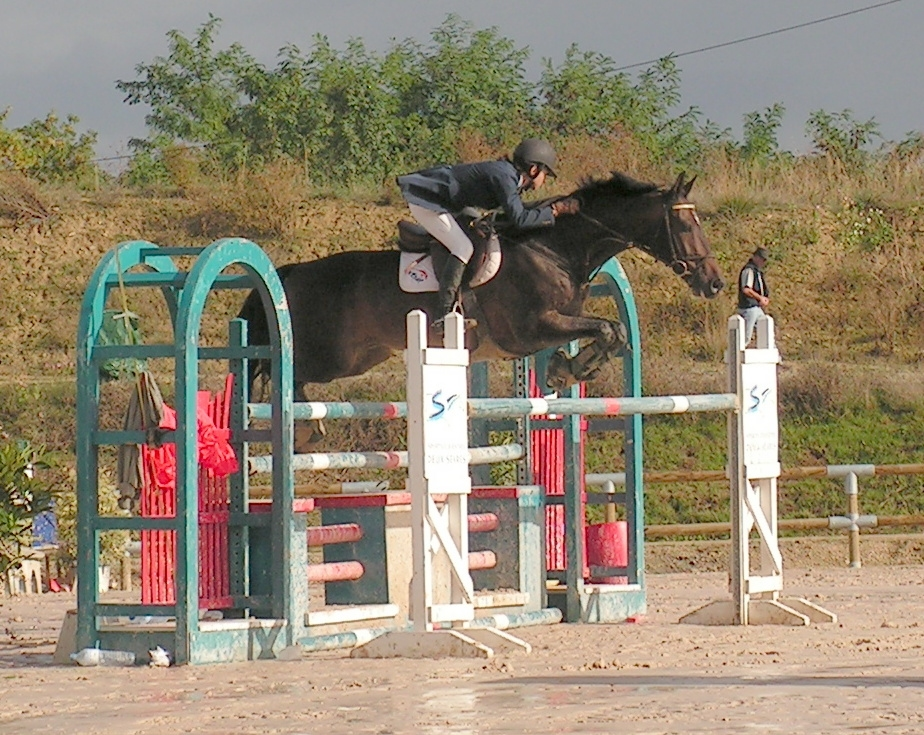
An example of a rider in jumping position

The jumping position is a position used by equestrians when jumping over an obstacle, involving a combination of both a "forward seat" and "2 point" position. A rider in jumping position has their body centered over the horse's center of gravity and the saddle. Continuing a line upwards from the stirrup leathers, the head and shoulders fall in front of the line, as do the knees and the hips fall behind it.

A correct jumping seat serves two purposes:

- It gives the horse freedom to jump the obstacle, allowing it to keep the forelegs and hindlegs tight, thereby decreasing the chance that the horse rolls down or falls. It also encourages the horse to bascule over the fence, which improves jumping form and the ability to jump higher obstacles.
- It provides the rider with the support needed to stay out of the horse's way while still maintaining a secure seat so that the horse is less likely to fall on landing.

== The influence of the horse on position ==
The jumping position keeps the rider in a position over the horse's center of gravity.

The horse, not the rider, is responsible for opening and closing the rider's angles (notably, the hip and knee). As the horse takes off, it raises its upper body off the ground and comes closer to the rider. This makes the rider's hip angle (between the thigh and chest) narrow. Over the fence, the rider keeps the angles closed. As the horse lands, it moves away from the rider's body, which allows the hip angle to open and the rider to become more perpendicular to the ground. Also, if the horse takes a jump wrong in some manner, due to rider error or other, the rider may be thrown around and may sometimes get "left behind". This is when the rider's center of balance is behind that of the horse. This can also throw the horse off balance and lead to other problems such as knocking down a rail.

== Position of the leg ==
Poor leg position often makes it difficult for the rider to stay with the horse's efforts

The lower leg is the anchor of rider's position and contributes to their security. Poor lower leg position makes a rider more likely to lose balance over fences and therefore increases the chance that they may fall. It also tends to decrease the ability of the rider to communicate clearly with his or her horse.

The leg should hang down the horse's side, making even contact along its whole length (inner thigh, knee, and calf), and should not change position when the upper body moves. The rider's weight is dropped along the back of the leg and into the heel through a flexible ankle so that the heel is lower than the toes. The toes are generally turned out slightly, to a degree greater than in the flatwork-only English riding disciplines such as dressage or saddle seat. This places the back of the calf against the horse, instead of the whole inner calf, as in dressage which decreases the refinement in communication between horse and rider but anchors the rider and increases security. Toes should turn no more than 45 degrees out.

The stirrups are shortened from the length used for flatwork and adjusted according to the height of the fence. Grand Prix jumpers and eventers on cross-country generally need to shorten the stirrups the most, to allow them to gallop and jump in motion with their horse. The short stirrup provides more leverage and flexibility, and therefore security, better balance and a more secure position should the horse stumble, get a poor distance, or peck on landing. More importantly, a shorter stirrup allows the rider to get off the horse's back between and over the fence, freeing up the back and allowing the horse to bascule. The stirrup leather should remain perpendicular to the ground. The stirrup iron is usually placed on the ball of the foot, allowing the rider to have a flexible, shock-absorbing ankle. The rider should keep even pressure across the foot, rather than pushing on the inside or outside of the stirrup iron, as this makes the lower leg stiff.

The result of a shorter stirrup is that the ankle and knee angle decrease. Both angles are used as shock absorbers, opening and closing accordingly with the thrust of takeoff and landing. Stiffness in these angles makes it harder to stay with the horse's balance, which may result in the rider "jumping ahead" or being "left behind."

=== Variations in leg position ===
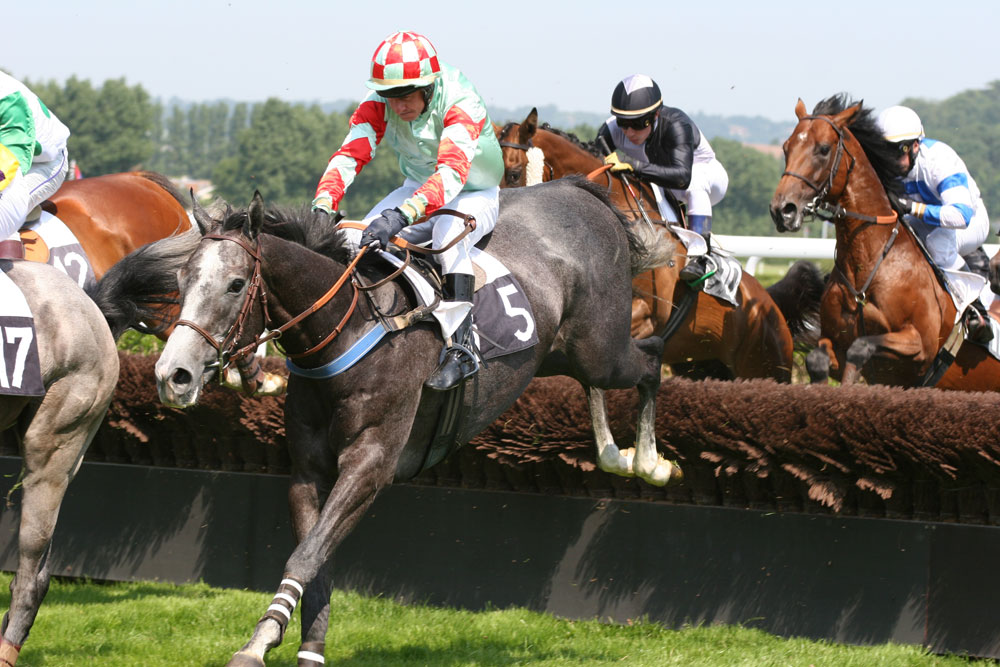
Steeplechase jockeys shove their legs forward for extra security.

Leg position may vary slightly between disciplines. Combining a relatively short stirrup with a need for security, Eventers and steeplechase jockeys tend to have a slightly forward leg position, with the foot "home" in the iron. The forward leg position increases security, making it more difficult for the rider to become dislodged. This is important in both sports because riders jump solid fences at high speed, where the horse is more likely to stumble or fall if it hits the fence. Especially in the case of steeplechase jockey, a fall could be extremely dangerous, as the other horses in the race could trample him or her.

The foot can be placed "home" (with the stirrup behind the ball of the foot, near the heel), for security purposes. This decreases the chance that the rider will lose a stirrup should a horse jump or land awkwardly. However, this is very dangerous in that should the rider fall, the foot may become caught in the iron and a rider could be dragged by the horse, resulting in serious injury or death.

== Position of the seat, hips, and thighs ==
The rider keeps their weight toward the pelvis and generally has enough weight in the stirrups to be suspended in the air over the saddle, rather than sitting on the horse's back. The rider should not bring the hips too far forward, over the pommel, as seen in the fault of jumping ahead. This changes the rider's balance and creates a potentially dangerous position.

The hip joints are especially important, as they are the connection between the lower leg (which remains still), and the upper body. The hips should be very flexible, opening and closing as needed. The hips should always move backward from the neutral position, not forward (a sign that the rider is jumping ahead).

Between fences, the rider may ride in two-point position, where the thighs take up the weight of the rider, not the seat bones. Another position used in galloping, when additional control is needed, is the "half seat," which resembles a two-point position, but the rider's seat bones lightly touch the saddle. At slower speeds, or if considerable control is needed, the rider may sit down on the horse, where the seat bones touch the saddle (Depending on regional terminology, both the half seat and a full seat are sometimes referred to as "three-point" position).

== Position of the upper body (shoulders, head, trunk) ==
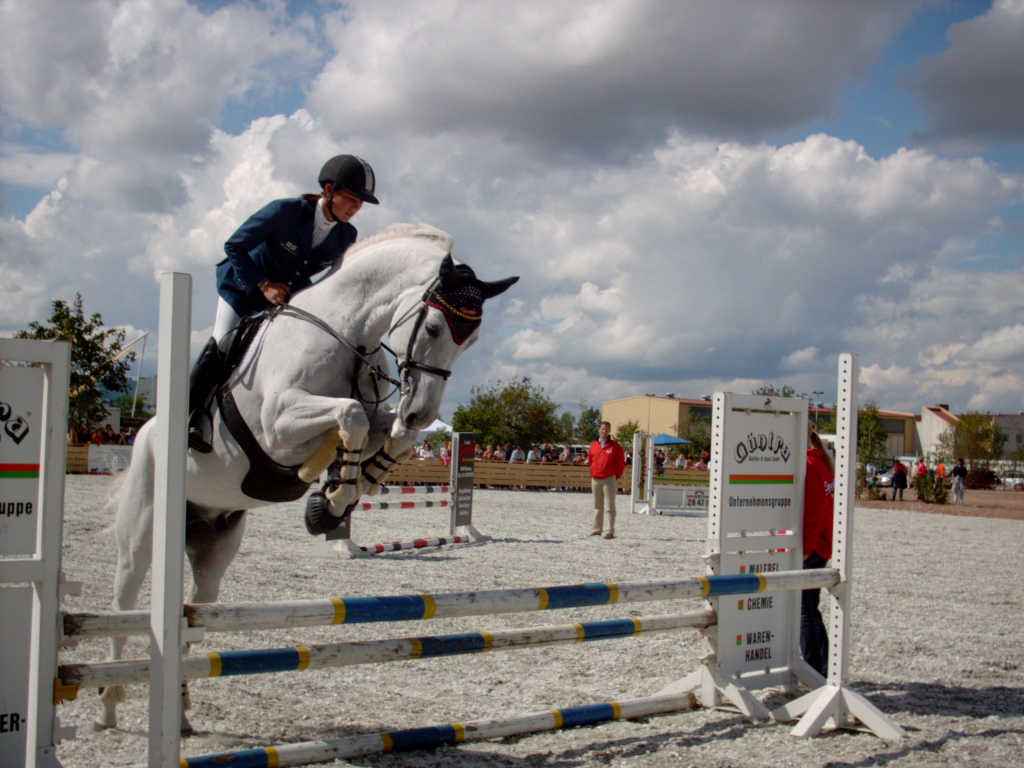
Looking down causes the upper body to fall forward.

In all disciplines, riders should be looking up and in the direction of where they need to go after landing. Looking down tends to cause riders to lean forward with their shoulders and round their back, thus placing them in a precarious position. The head should also not be tilted to one side, as this changes the rider's lateral balance and places more weight on one side.

In general, the back should be flat. Overarching causes stiffness and affects the rider's balance. A slightly rounded back is acceptable cross-country when used in the safety seat.

The rider should have an open chest with shoulders back. This helps to prevent the rider from collapsing forward and helps to center the weight of the upper body over the lower leg, therefore helping to keep the rider secure.

== Releases ==
In all cases, the rider should release the horse over a fence, or in other words, lengthen enough rein so the horse can stretch its neck forward and use it as a balancing mechanism. The key to a good release is relaxed arms with proper hand, wrist, and elbow position. First, the arms (elbows and shoulders) should be soft and elastic, allowing the horse to pull them forward as needed. Preferably, there should be a straight line from bit to elbow (automatic release), as this improves contact and communication between horse and rider. The wrists of the rider should remain soft and straight, as bent wrists tend to stiffen the lower arm. The elbows should be next to the rider's side, not "chicken-winged" and pointing outward, which decreases flexibility and softness.

As in all riding, the hands should be softly closed, neither tightly holding the reins which causes tension and stiffness, or so soft that the reins easily slip through. The one exception to this rule is when the rider needs to slip the reins.

=== Types of releases ===
There are three classic releases. Different releases are used depending on different circumstances and riders need to be able to use them all.

Basic release: The rider grabs the mane of the horse. This allows the rider to avoid falling back and hitting the horse in the mouth or back or try to use the mouth for balance. It is used by beginner riders when they do not yet have the position and balance to do more advanced releases without risking hitting their horse in the mouth. It is also used by more advanced riders on green horses, who tend to overjump, or when a rider loses position due to an awkward jump. Riders should not think it is reserved for novices, and all good riders will grab mane to save their horse's mouth. However, it provides the least amount of control. It should therefore not be used unless it is required. It can also be used for galloping, where the weight of the rider should be in the heels, therefore giving the horse freedom.

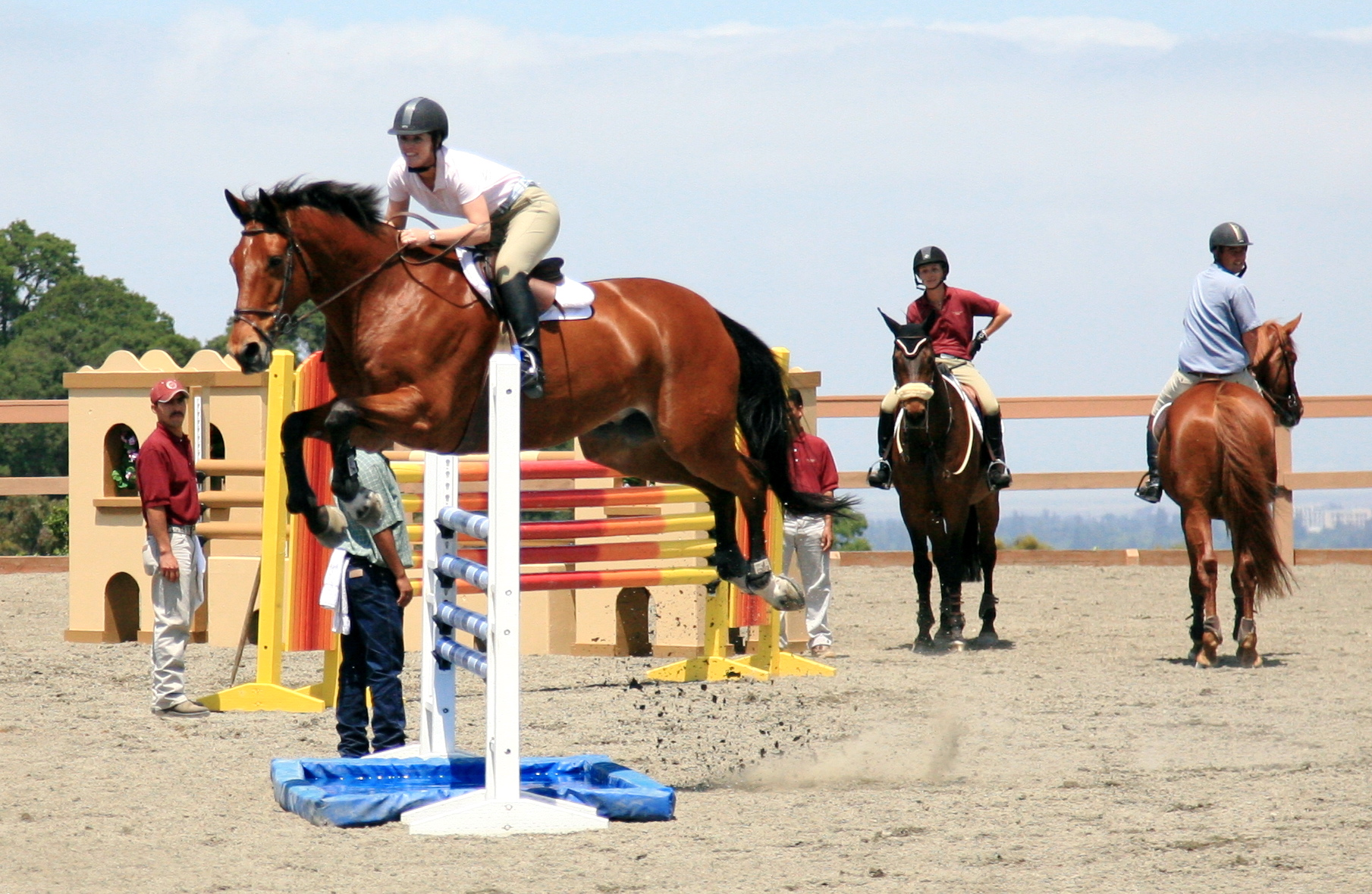
Short crest release

Short crest release: The rider slides the hands up the crest as the horse takes off, not before (which "drops" the horse). The hands should not slide far up the crest, only a couple of inches as needed. It provides support for the rider's upper body, while still providing a good amount of control because the rider did not release any more than needed. Best used on verticals, when the rider needs to turn mid-air, or when going down drop fences. An intermediate release.

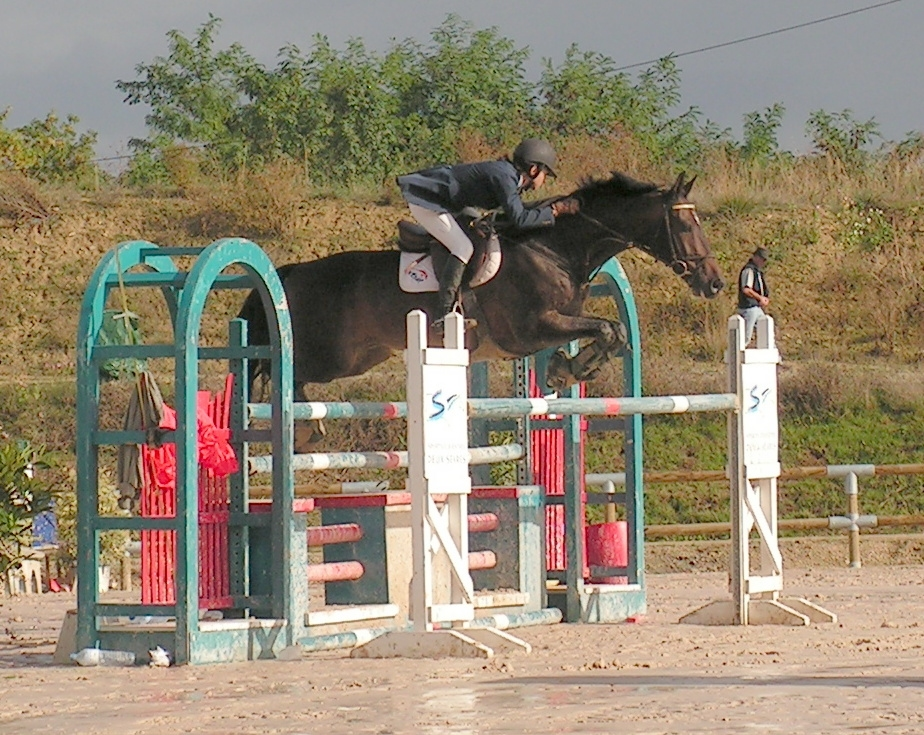
A long crest release being used for a large oxer to allow the horse more freedom

Long crest release: Similar to the short crest release, in that the rider slides his hands up the crest, but the hands are pushed much further along the neck. Gives a great deal of freedom, but fairly little control. Best for very wide oxers, to allow the horse to really stretch across, or for green horses that may jump large or awkwardly, for gymnastics grids, and for use on horses that have been hit in the mouth over fences and are reluctant to jump or stretch down over a fence. The rider should be careful not to associate a large move forward with the hands and elbows to mean a move forward with the hips. The hip angle should still close backwards. Many riders get into the habit of jumping ahead with this release. Critics say this release is overused and exaggerated by hunter riders; in the hunter ring it is often used by experienced and/or professional riders on well-trained horses over jumps of relatively modest size. Proponents say that this shows off a talented hunter by proving the horse needs little assistance from the rider to jump in good form.

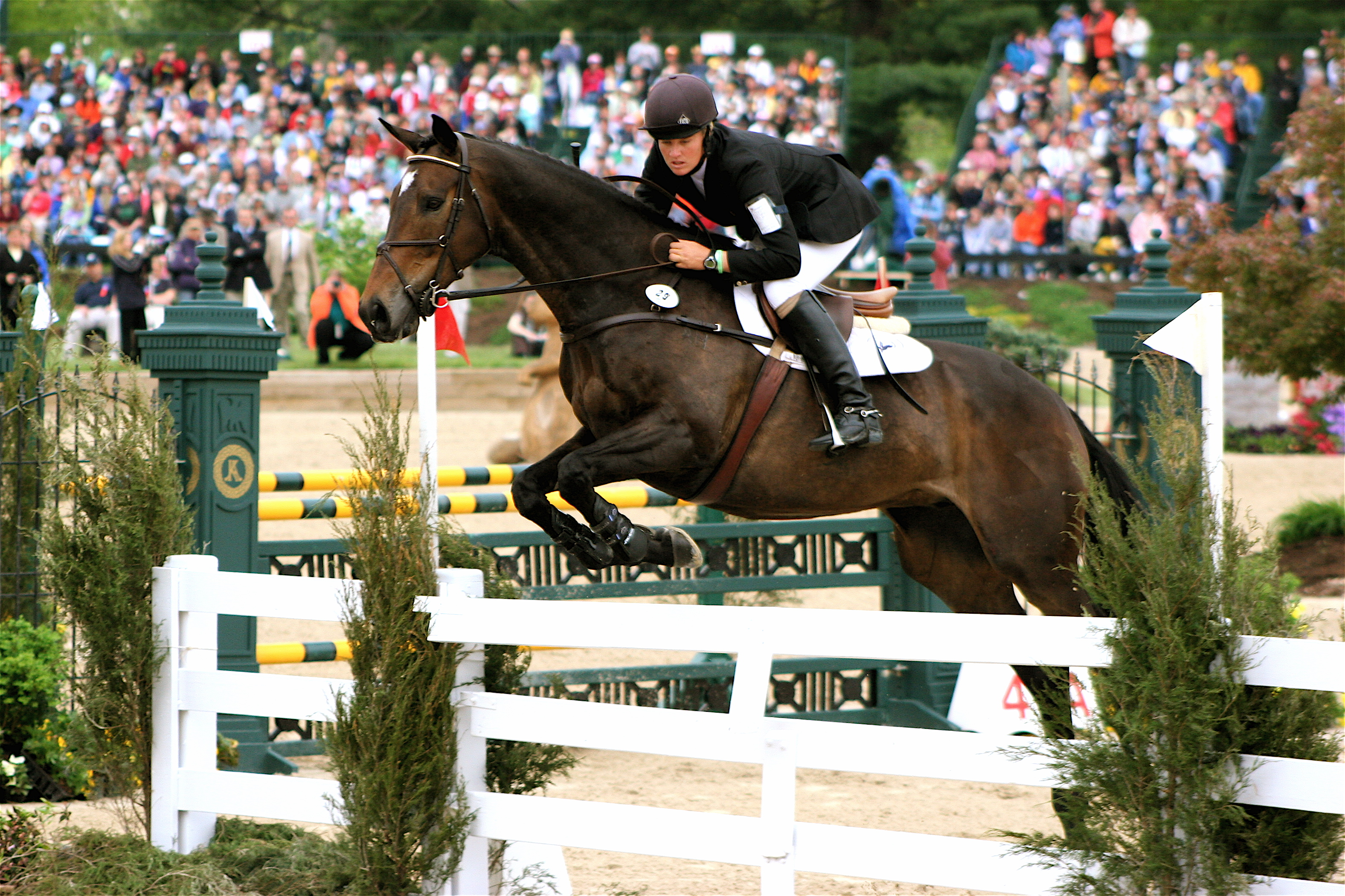
The automatic release: the rider has a straight line from elbow to bit, and maintains a soft, elastic contact with the horse's mouth.

Automatic release: The most advanced release, where the rider maintains a soft, elastic, steady rein contact with a straight line from elbow to bit as the horse jumps. This release results in a great deal of control and communication between horse and rider, allowing the rider to signal to the horse what to do on landing. It allows the rider to better turn while in the air, correct horses that jump crookedly, and provide the support that some horses prefer over fences. It is also good on horses that need much control after landing. However, the automatic release requires perfect balance from the rider to be executed correctly. An unsteady rider will catch the horse in the mouth, and an incorrect automatic release will spoil a horse's jump and confidence. However, if a rider is able to perform it correctly, it is often best to use this release whenever possible. Very useful in show jumping and eventing, where control is very important.

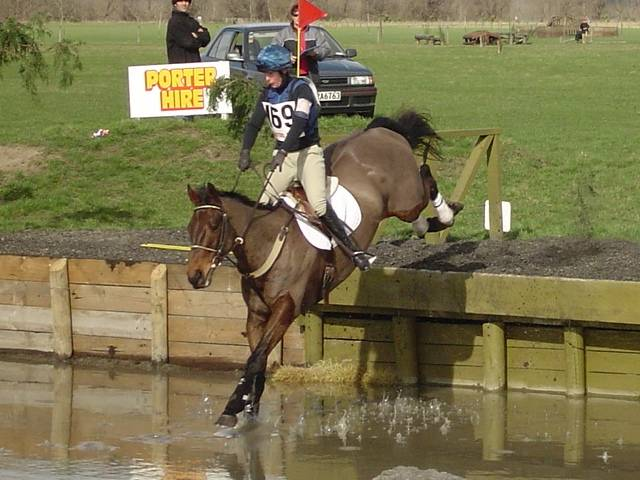
Slipping the reins while going down a drop

Slipping the reins: Not a release, but rather simply letting the reins slide through the hands a bit. It is a very valuable tool all riders should have. To be used when the rider gets behind the motion by accident, when riding drop fences or fences with a downhill landing, or when a horse gets in trouble over a fence (such as catching a leg on a cross-country fence). This move allows the rider to release the horse and gives them the freedom they need, without forcing the rider to do one of the other releases (which are inappropriate for drop fences). However, it results in extra-long reins on landing, so the rider must be able to immediately gather up the reins and shorten them to the correct length.

== Common faults ==
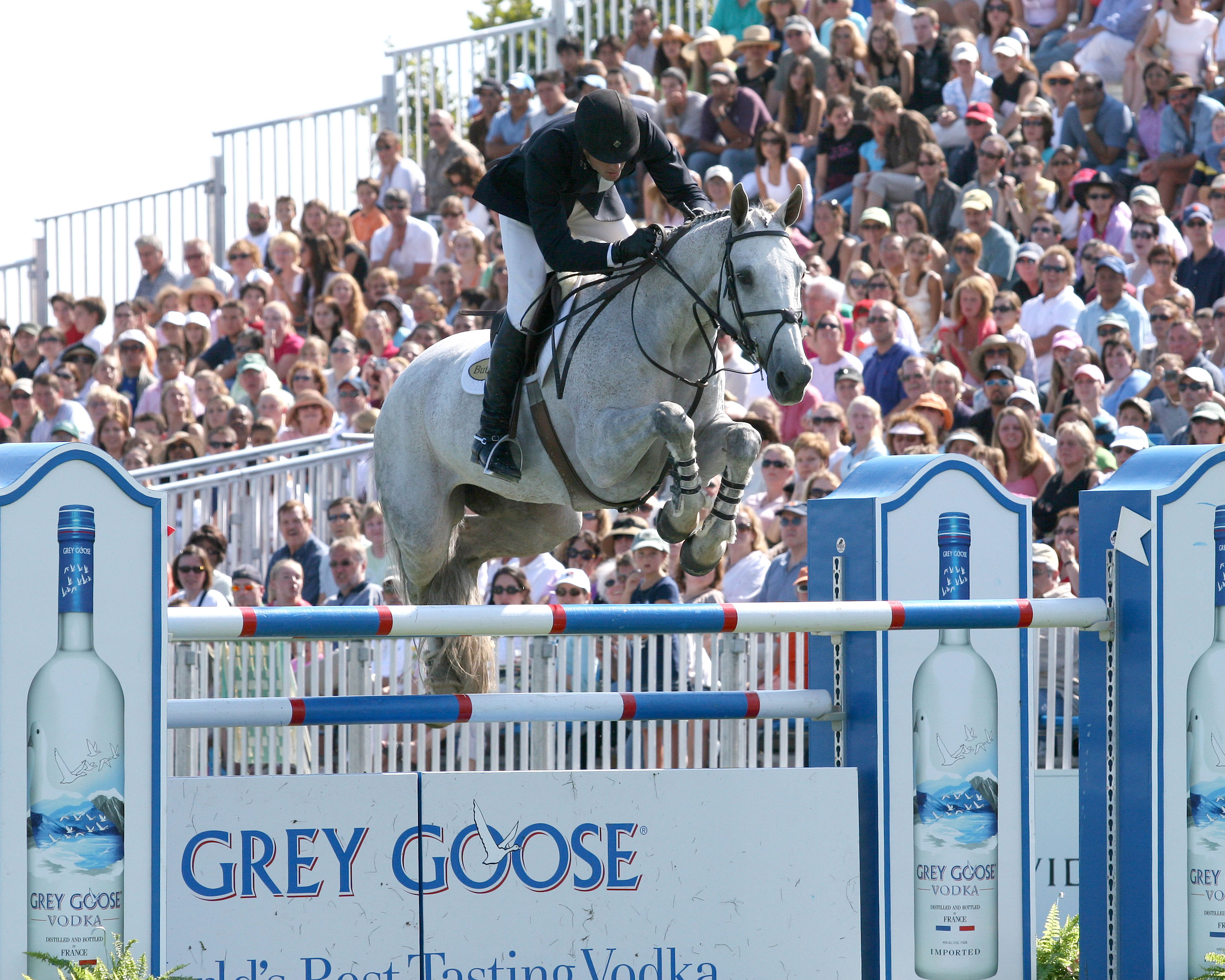
Grand Prix fences will sometimes make even the best riders lose the classic position.

- Swinging lower leg: This usually occurs if the rider pinches or grips with the knees, lacks contact throughout the whole leg (for example, has no contact with the thigh), or rides with stirrups that are too long to provide correct balance and support. Since the lower leg is the rider's anchor, a swinging lower leg greatly decreases security and can be very dangerous if the rider is jumping complex fences at high speeds. There are two common occasions for the swinging leg. First, the Grand Prix rider may lose position because the fences are so large, and the horse's thrust and motion are very difficult to follow. Riders of this caliber are generally able to compensate for their deviations from the classical position due to skill and experience. Second, this is commonly seen by show hunter riders, because their horses have such powerful jumps and round bascule that it is hard to stay with the jump. In both cases, however, there are riders able to maintain a classical position.
- Toes down/Heels up: This is usually accompanied by the swinging lower leg. Often due to incorrect leg position, too-long stirrup, or, in some cases, due to the rider standing on the toe, instead of sinking his or her weight down his lower leg. Again, this places the rider in a very precarious position. Doing this can have the rider too ahead of the horse.
- Lower leg shoved forward: Pushing the lower leg forward slightly is appropriate for some fences (such as cross-country) for added security. However, it is not appropriate for riding on level ground in a manicured arena at low speeds. Shoving the lower leg forward tends to decrease the rider's ability to stay with the motion, placing them in "the back seat" and increasing the risk of falling onto their horse's back while over a fence. It is sometimes associated with "getting left behind."

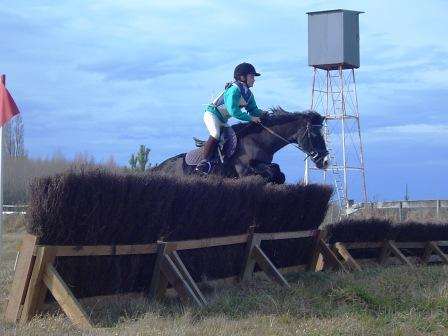
A rider jumping ahead. Note the open hip and knee angles, and the fact that her hips are in front of the line made by the stirrup leather.

- Jumping ahead: This involves the rider opening the hip angle over the fence, rather than folding back so that the majority of the body is in front of the line made by the stirrup leather. The lower leg usually swings backward. It places the rider in a very insecure position since the rider not only loses his or her base of support (the lower leg) but also is in front of the horse's center of motion. This means that the rider will fall forward (and possibly off) if the horse for any reason slows down its motion (stops, runs out, or stumbles). Secondly, this throws the rider's weight over the horse's shoulders, making it very difficult for the horse to take off and harder to get out of trouble on landing. Riders most commonly jump ahead if they are trying to jump for their horse or if they anticipate the take-off and do not wait for the horse to close their hip and knee angles.

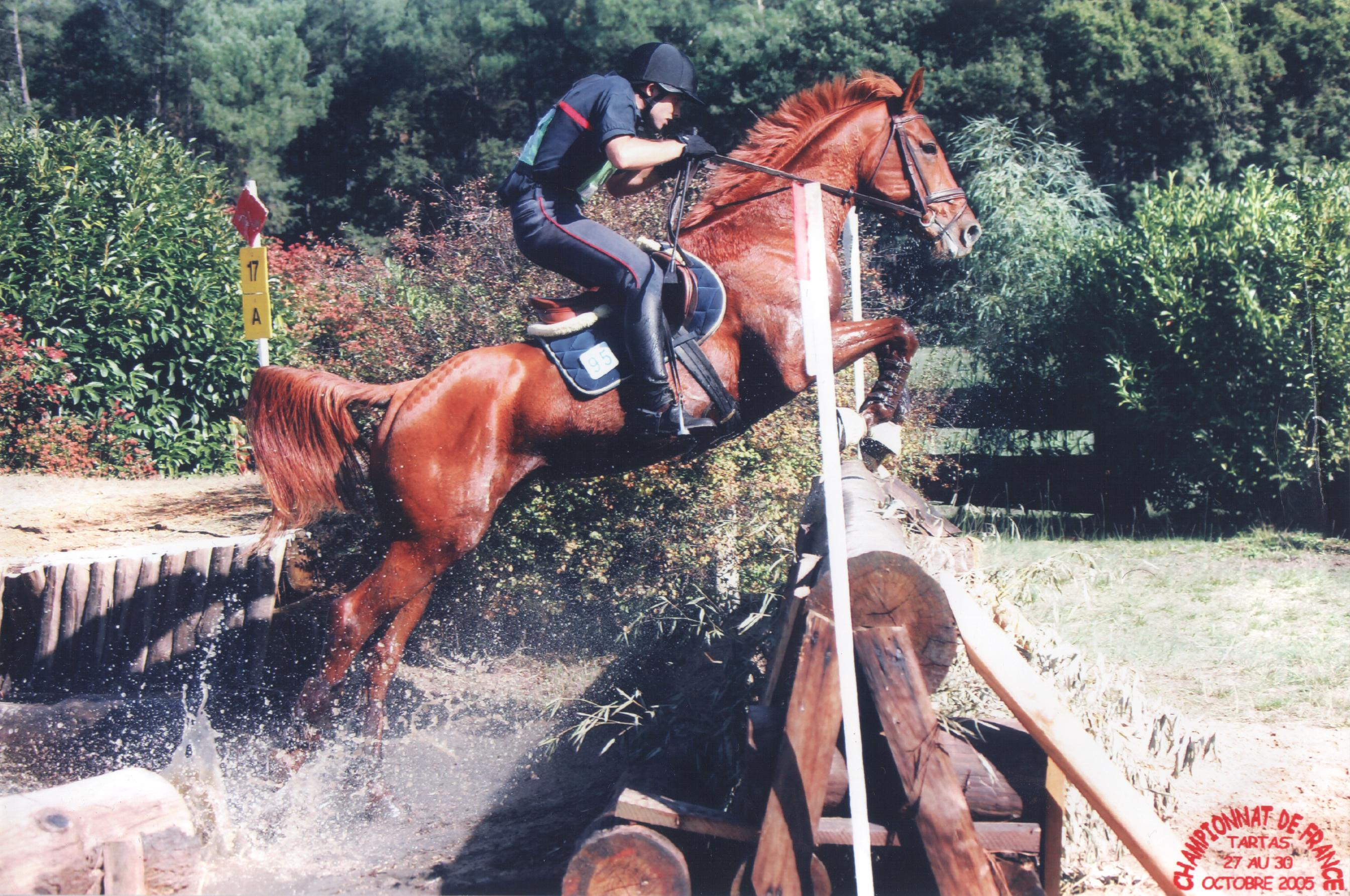
This rider has been left behind, due to his horse's huge jump out of the water. He must be sure to slip his reins to prevent catching the horse in the mouth.

- Getting "left behind": When the rider's body is mostly behind the line made by the perpendicular stirrup leather, and behind the horse's motion. This results in the rider placing extra weight on the horse's back. Hitting the horse in the back is a huge fault in the hunter arenas because it punishes the horse for rounding into the bascule which is essential in those disciplines and can cause knockdowns in show jumping. However, being behind the motion is not marked down in eventing when riding cross-country. This is because a solid seat slightly behind the motion places the rider in an extremely secure seat (as riders usually fall off over the shoulder of the horse, not the hindquarters) and because a great bascule is not encouraged cross-country. This position is performed in degrees depending on the type of fence, with most fences where the rider is behind the motion but not putting his seat bones on the horse's back, and others, such as drop fences, where it is essential that the rider keep his or her seat completely in the saddle for security purposes. However, getting left behind sometimes occurs if the rider's upper body is too open and is leaning back before the fence if the horse takes off from a very long distance (jumps from too far back), or if the rider's lower leg is shoved so far forward in front of the knee that it forces the upper body back. In all cases, the rider must slip the reins to provide the horse freedom of movement to get over the fence.
- Snapping up: When the rider throws the upper body upward, quickly opening the hip angle on the landing side. This risks that the rider will catch the horse in the mouth or put too much weight on its back. It also disrupts the horse's jump. It usually occurs when a rider has gotten into the habit of falling forward and tries to compensate by bringing his or her upper body back too soon before the horse has completed the jump.
- Ducking: When the rider bends the hip angles too much and snaps the upper body over one shoulder. This makes the horse carry uneven weight on one side, which makes it more difficult for it to jump. This occurs when the rider has too much weight in one stirrup instead of being evenly centered.

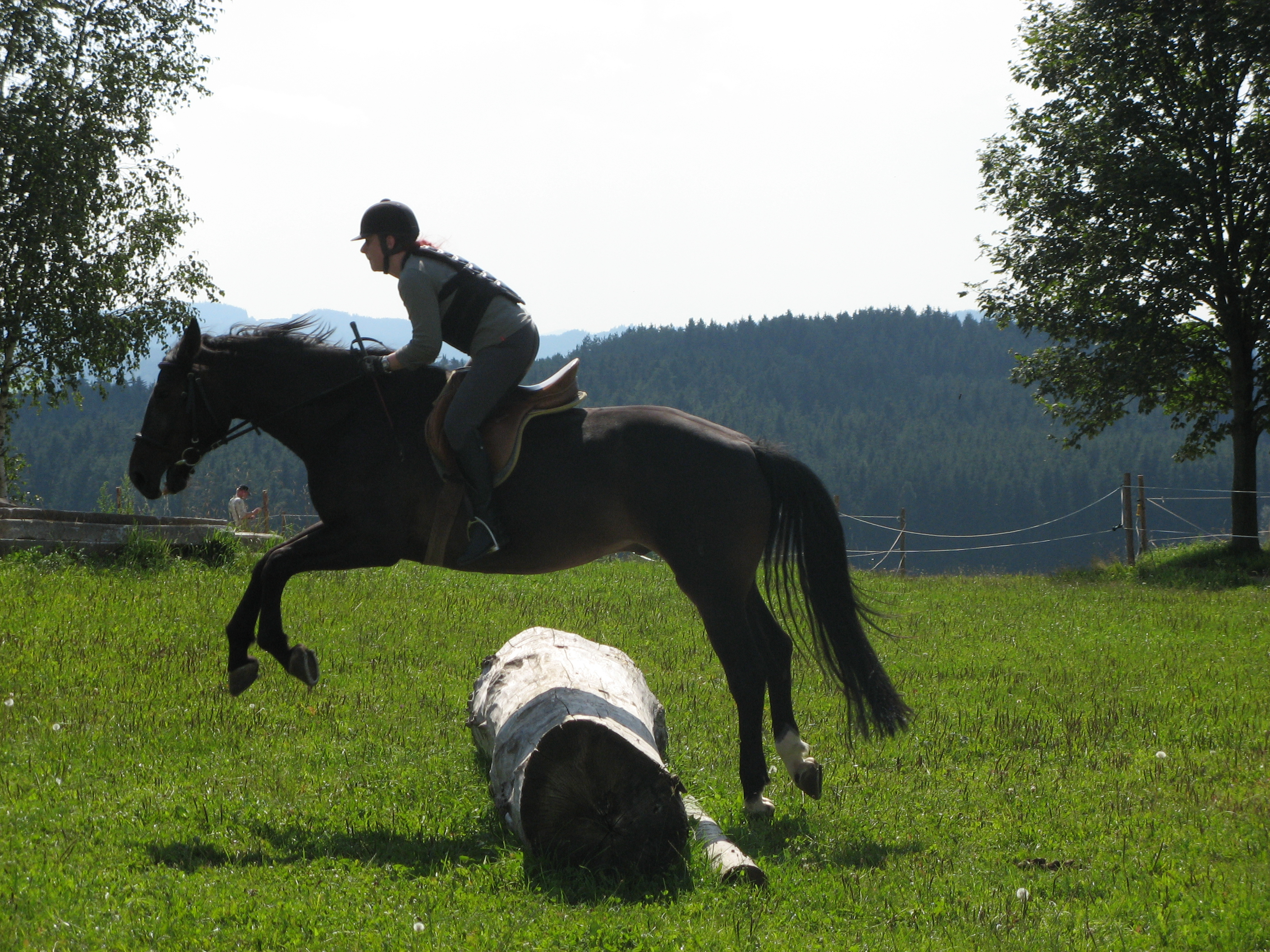
This rider has hit his horse in the mouth because he is not releasing sufficiently.

- Not releasing: Failing to release can cause a host of problems, as it causes the horse to jump flat, and can result in the horse associating jumping with pain, which may lead to stopping. A poor release may occur for several reasons. First, the rider may use the reins for support over the fence because he or she has not developed the correct balance. In this situation, it is important that the rider grab the horse's mane for support, instead. A rider who is left behind in the motion may also fail to release. In these cases, the rider should be sure to slip the reins. Some riders ride this way when they are mounted on strong horses, and they wish to tell the horse to slow down over the fence before landing, or get in the habit of overusing their hands between fences and forgetting to release. In this case, the rider must make a conscious effort to remember to release the horse into the air. Failure to release may also occur when riders plant their hands on the horse's neck support their upper body during a jump, and place their hands too far back to allow adequate rein for the horse, or if the riders keep contact during takeoff but stiffen their elbows so that they don't follow that contact forward over the fence. Occasionally, it appears as if a rider is not releasing enough, when in fact he or she is slipping the reins or performing a correct automatic release.
- Incorrect release: When the rider releases by throwing their hands above the horse's neck, into the air, or significantly below the neck. This may change or disrupt the rider's balance during the jump.
