= Show jumping =

Competitive equestrian sport

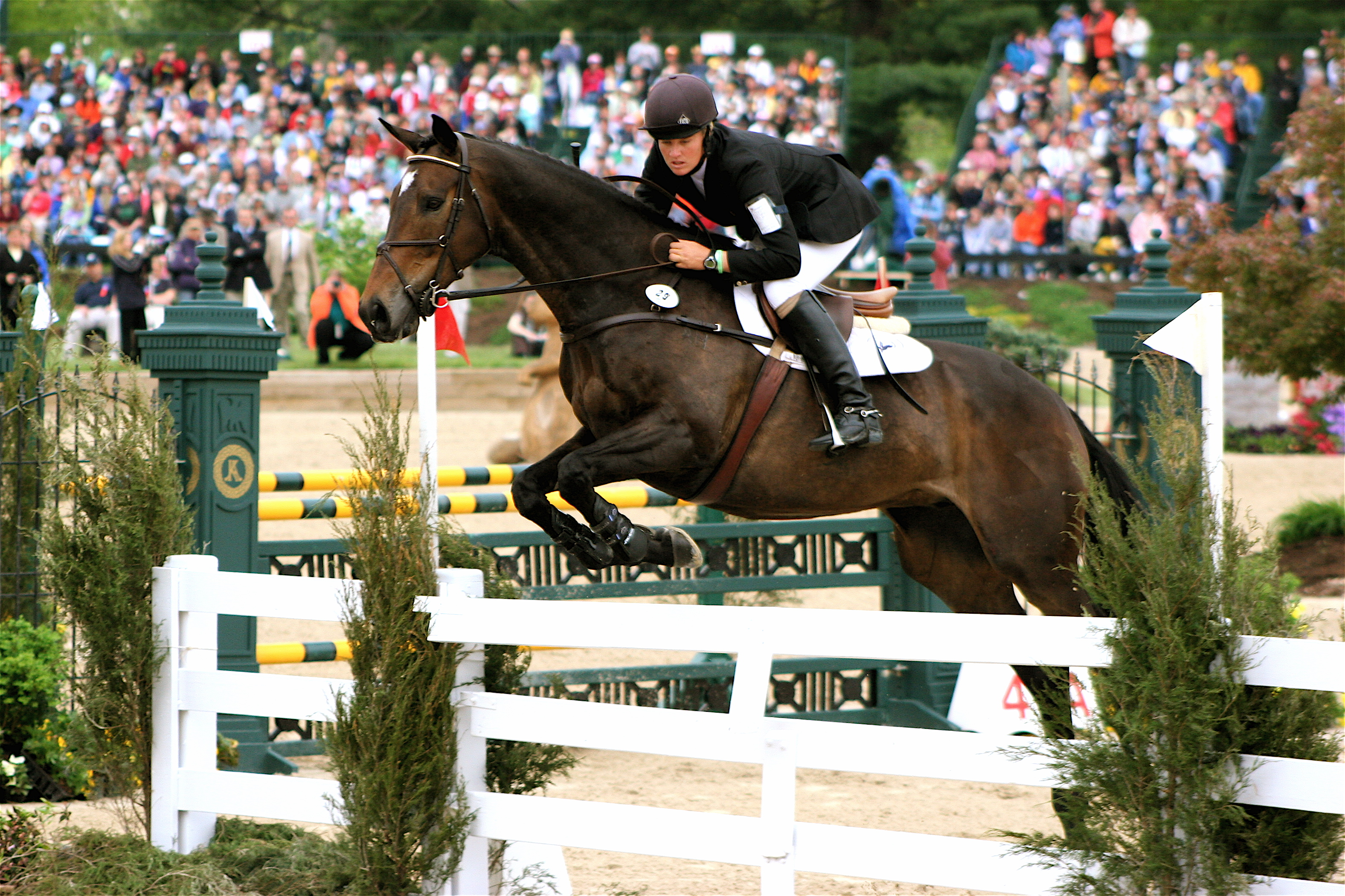
- Highest governing body: International Federation for Equestrian Sports (FEI)
- Nicknames: Jumpers; jumping; stadium jumping
- Registered players: Yes
- Clubs: Yes

Characteristics
- Contact: No
- Team members: Individual and team at international levels
- Mixed-sex: Yes
- Type: Indoor/outdoor
- Equipment: Horse; horse tack
- Venue: Usually outdoor on grass or dirt-surfaced arena

Presence
- Country or region: Worldwide
- Olympic: 1912

Show jumping is a part of a group of English riding equestrian events that also includes eventing, hunters, and equitation. Jumping classes are commonly seen at horse shows throughout the world, including the Olympics. Sometimes shows are limited exclusively to jumpers. Sometimes jumper classes are offered in conjunction with other English-style events. Sometimes, show jumping is but one division of a very large, all-breed competition that includes a very wide variety of disciplines. Jumping classes may be governed by various national horse show sanctioning organizations, such as the United States Equestrian Federation or the British Showjumping Association. International competitions are governed by the rules of the International Federation for Equestrian Sports.

== Hunters or jumpers ==
Show jumping events have hunter classes, jumper classes and hunt seat equitation classes.

Hunters are judged subjectively on the degree to which they meet an ideal standard of manners, style, and way of going. Conversely, jumper classes are scored objectively, based entirely on a numerical score determined only by whether the horse attempts the obstacle, clears it, and finishes the course in the allotted time. Jumper courses tend to be much more complex and technical than hunter courses because riders and horses are not being judged on style. Courses often are colorful, and at times quite creatively designed. Jumper courses can range anywhere in height from .55 to 1.6 m (1.8 to 5.2 ft), with exceptional jumps of 1.65 m (5.4 ft).

Hunters have meticulous turnout and tend toward very quiet, conservative horse tack and rider attire. Hunter bits, bridles, crops, spurs, and martingales are tightly regulated. Jumpers, while caring for their horses and grooming them well, are not scored on turnout, are allowed a wider range of equipment, and may wear less conservative attire, so long as it stays within the rules. Some events may make it compulsory to wear show jackets. Formal turnout always is preferred; a neat rider gives a good impression at shows.

In addition to hunters and jumpers, there are equitation classes, sometimes called hunt seat equitation, which judges the ability of the rider. The equipment, clothing, and fence styles used in equitation more closely resemble hunter classes, although the technical difficulty of the courses may more closely resemble showjumping events. This is because both disciplines are designed to test the rider's ability to control the horse through a difficult course consisting of rollbacks, combinations, and higher obstacles.

== Rules ==
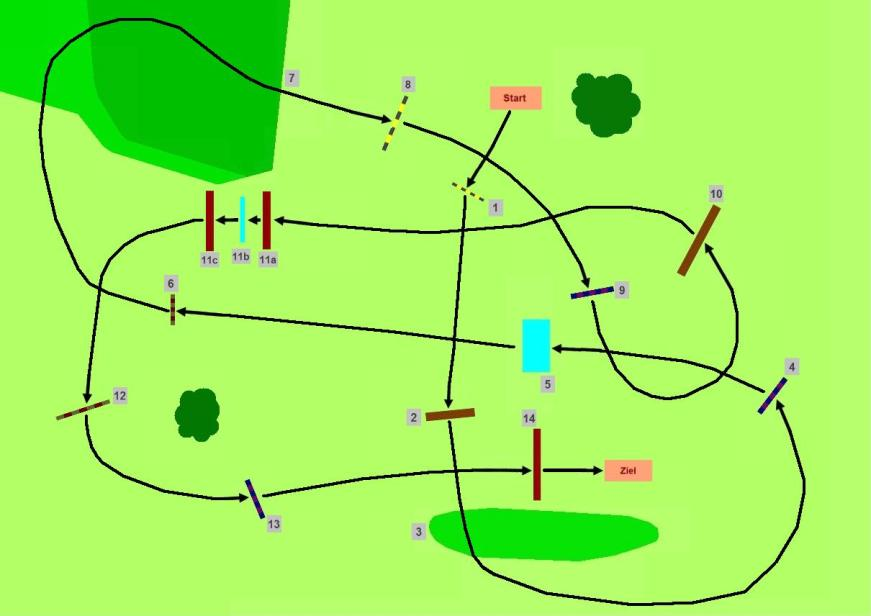
Diagram of a show jumping course

Jumper classes are held over a course of show jumping obstacles, including verticals, spreads, and double and triple combinations, usually with many turns and changes of direction. The intent is to jump cleanly over a set course within an allotted time. Time faults are assessed for exceeding the time allowance. Jumping faults are incurred for knockdowns and blatant disobedience, such as refusals (when the horse stops before a fence or the horse, "runs out") (see Modern scoring below). Horses are allowed a limited number of refusals before being disqualified. A refusal may lead to a rider exceeding the time allowed on course. Placings are based on the lowest number of points or "faults" accumulated. A horse and rider who have not accumulated any jumping faults or penalty points are said to have scored a "clear round". Tied entries usually have a jump-off over a raised and shortened course, and the course is timed; if entries are tied for faults accumulated in the jump-off, the fastest time wins.

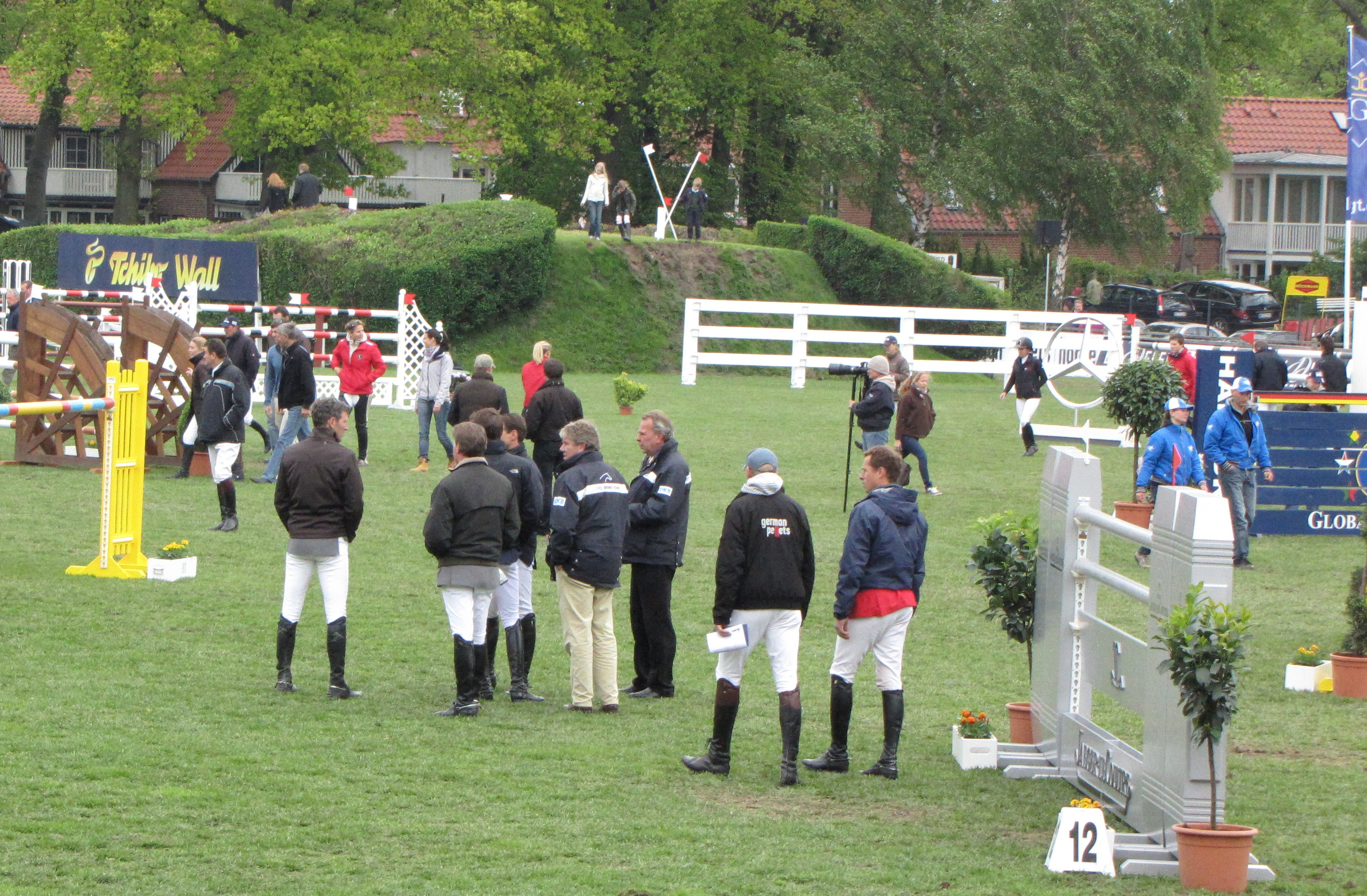
Riders walking the course and inspecting the jumps

In most competitions, riders are allowed to walk the initial course but not the jump-off course (usually the same course with missing jumps, e.g., 1, 3, 5, 7, 8 instead of 1, 2, 3, 4, 5, 6, 7, 8, 9 or the same course but timed) before competition to plan their ride. Walking the course before the event is a chance for the rider to walk the lines they will have to ride, in order to decide how many strides the horse will need to take between each jump and from which angle. Going off course will cost time if minor errors are made and major departures will result in disqualification.

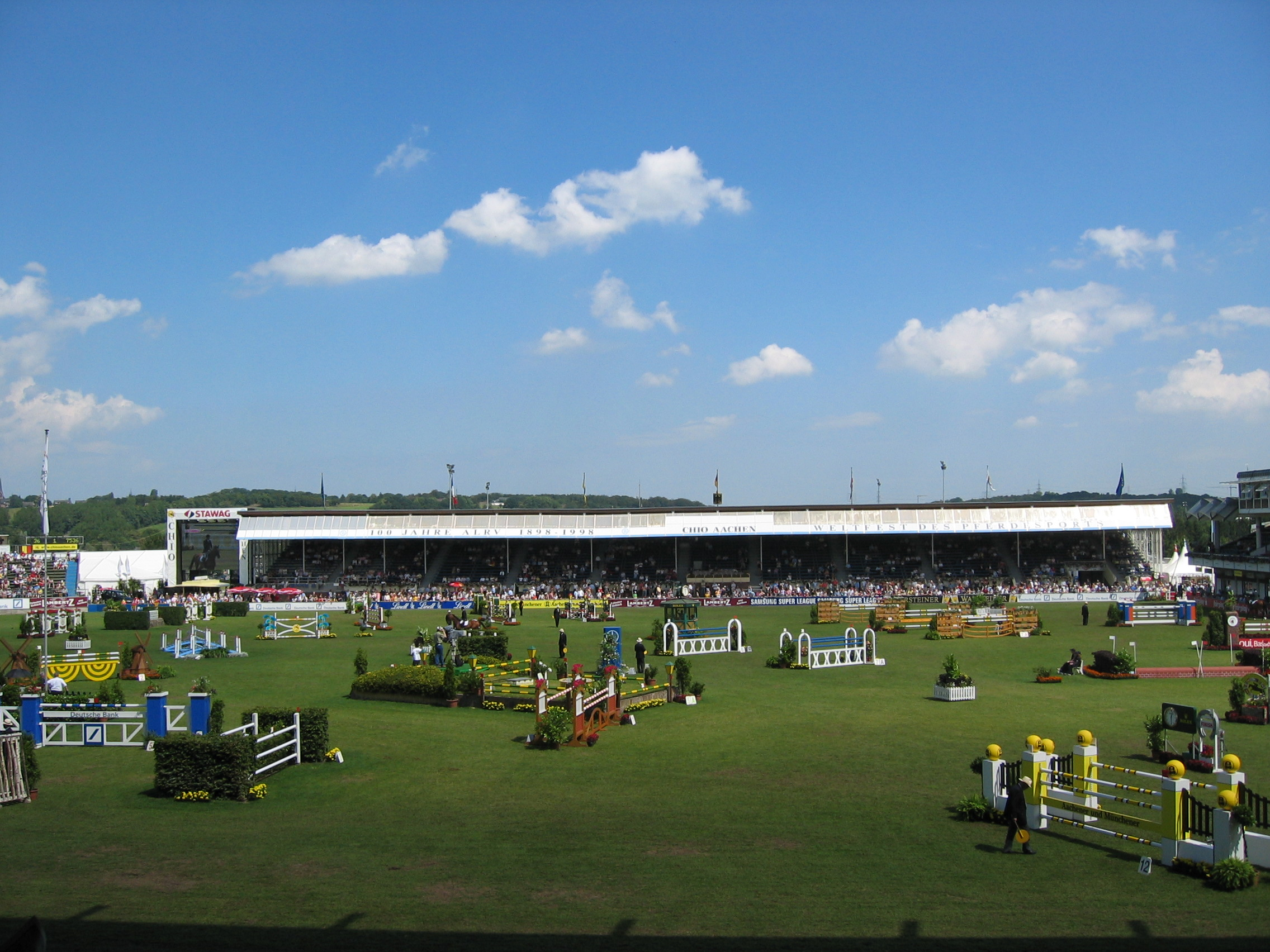
An outdoor show jumping course

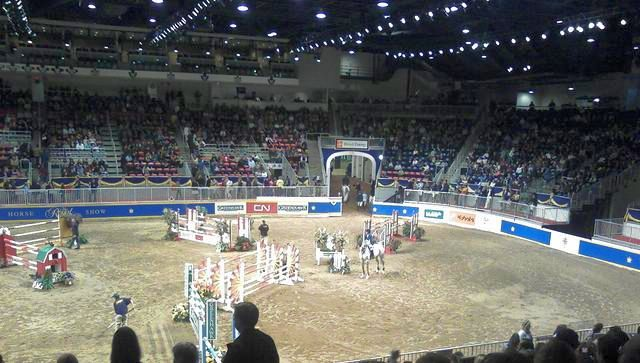
An indoor show jumping course

The higher levels of competition, such as "A" or "AA" rated shows in the United States, or the international "Grand Prix" circuit, present more technical and complex courses. Not only is the height and width ("spread") of an obstacle increased to present a greater challenge, technical difficulty also increases with tighter turns and shorter or unusual distances between fences. Horses sometimes also have to jump fences from an angle rather than straight on. For example, a course designer might set up a line so that there are six and a half strides (the standard measure for a canter stride is twelve feet) between the jumps, requiring the rider to adjust the horse's stride dramatically in order to make the distance. This could also mean that the rider may have to add or subtract a stride to clear the jump with more ease. How the rider chooses to adjust can also depend on their horse. If a horse has a smaller stride in comparison to the average, they may need to add another stride and vice versa if the horse has a longer stride.

Unlike show hunter classes, which reward calmness and style, jumper classes require boldness, scope, power, accuracy, and control; speed also is a factor, especially in jump-off courses and speed classes (when time counts even in the first round). The first round of the class consists of the rider and horse having to go around the course without refusing or knocking down any jumps while also staying within the time allowed. If the horse/rider combination completes the first round successfully, then they move on to the second round, called the "jump-off". In a jump-off, the rider needs to plan ahead because they must be very speedy and also not have any faults. The jump-off has fewer jumps than the first round but is usually much more difficult. To win this round, the rider has to be the quickest while still not refusing or knocking down any jumps. In most competitions, the penalties for knocking a pole down is four per pole. This is then added to any time penalties that have occurred

== History ==
Show jumping is an equestrian sport. Until the inclosure acts, which came into force in England in the 18th century, there had been little need for horses to jump fences routinely, but with this act of Parliament came new challenges for those who followed fox hounds. The inclosure acts brought fencing and boundaries to many parts of the country as common ground was dispersed amongst separate owners. This meant that those wishing to pursue their sport now needed horses that were capable of jumping these obstacles.

In the early horse shows held in France, there was a parade of competitors who then took off across country for the jumping. This sport was, however, not popular with spectators since they could not follow to watch the jumping. Thus, it was not long before fences began to appear in an arena for the competitions. This became known as Lepping. 1869 was the year 'horse leaping' came to prominence at Dublin horse show. Fifteen years later, Lepping competitions were brought to Britain and by 1900 most of the more important shows had Lepping classes. Separate classes were held for women riding sidesaddle.

At this time, the principal cavalry schools of Europe at Pinerolo and Tor-di-Quinto in Italy, the French school in Saumur, and the Spanish school in Vienna all preferred to use a very deep seat with long stirrups when jumping. While this style of riding may have felt more secure for the rider, it also impeded the freedom of the horse to use its body to the extent needed to clear large obstacles.

An Italian riding instructor, Captain Federico Caprilli, heavily influenced the world of jumping with his ideas promoting a forward position with shorter stirrups. This style placed the rider in a position that did not interfere with the balance of the horse while negotiating obstacles. This style, now known as the forward seat, is commonly used today. The deep, Dressage-style seat, while useful for riding on the flat and in conditions where control of the horse is of greater importance than freedom of movement, is less suitable for jumping.

The first major show jumping competition held in England was at Olympia in 1907. Most of the competitors were members of the military and it became clear at this competition and in the subsequent years, that there was no uniformity of rules for the sport. Judges marked on their own opinions. Some marked according to the severity of the obstacle and others marked according to style. Before 1907 there were no penalties for a refusal and the competitor was sometimes asked to miss the fence to please the spectators. The first courses were built with little imagination, many consisting of only a straight bar fence and a water jump. A meeting was arranged in 1923 which led to the formation of the BSJA in 1925. In the United States, a similar need for national rules for jumping and other equestrian activities led to the formation of the American Horse Shows Association in 1917, which now is known as the United States Equestrian Federation.

An early form of show jumping first was incorporated into the Olympic Games in 1900. Show jumping in its current format appeared in 1912 and has thrived ever since, its recent popularity due in part to its suitability as a spectator sport that is well adapted for viewing on television.

== Scoring ==
=== Historic scoring ===
The original list of faults introduced in Great Britain in 1925 were as follows:

- Refusing or running out at any fence:

1st: 4 faults
2nd: another 4 faults added on
3rd: elimination (ELM)
(At first, stadium jumps were set as a single rail that sometimes would be up to five feet high. Some horses began to duck under these jumps instead, which perhaps is the origin of the term "ducking out" at a fence.)

- Fall of the horse, the rider, or both: elimination
- Touches: If a horse touched a fence without knocking it down, zero faults
- Rail down with front hooves: 4 faults
- Rail down with back hooves: 4 faults
- Foot in the water jump: If a horse lands with any number of feet in the water: 4 faults. No faults were incurred, however, if the raised block in front of the water was knocked down.
- Failure to break the timers starting or finishing would result in elimination.

Water jumps were once at least 15 feet (5 m) wide, although the water often had drained out of them by the time the last competitor jumped. High jumping would start with a pole at around five feet high, but this was later abandoned since many horses went under the pole. It was for this reason that more poles were added and fillers came into use. Time penalties were not counted until 1917.

=== Modern scoring ===
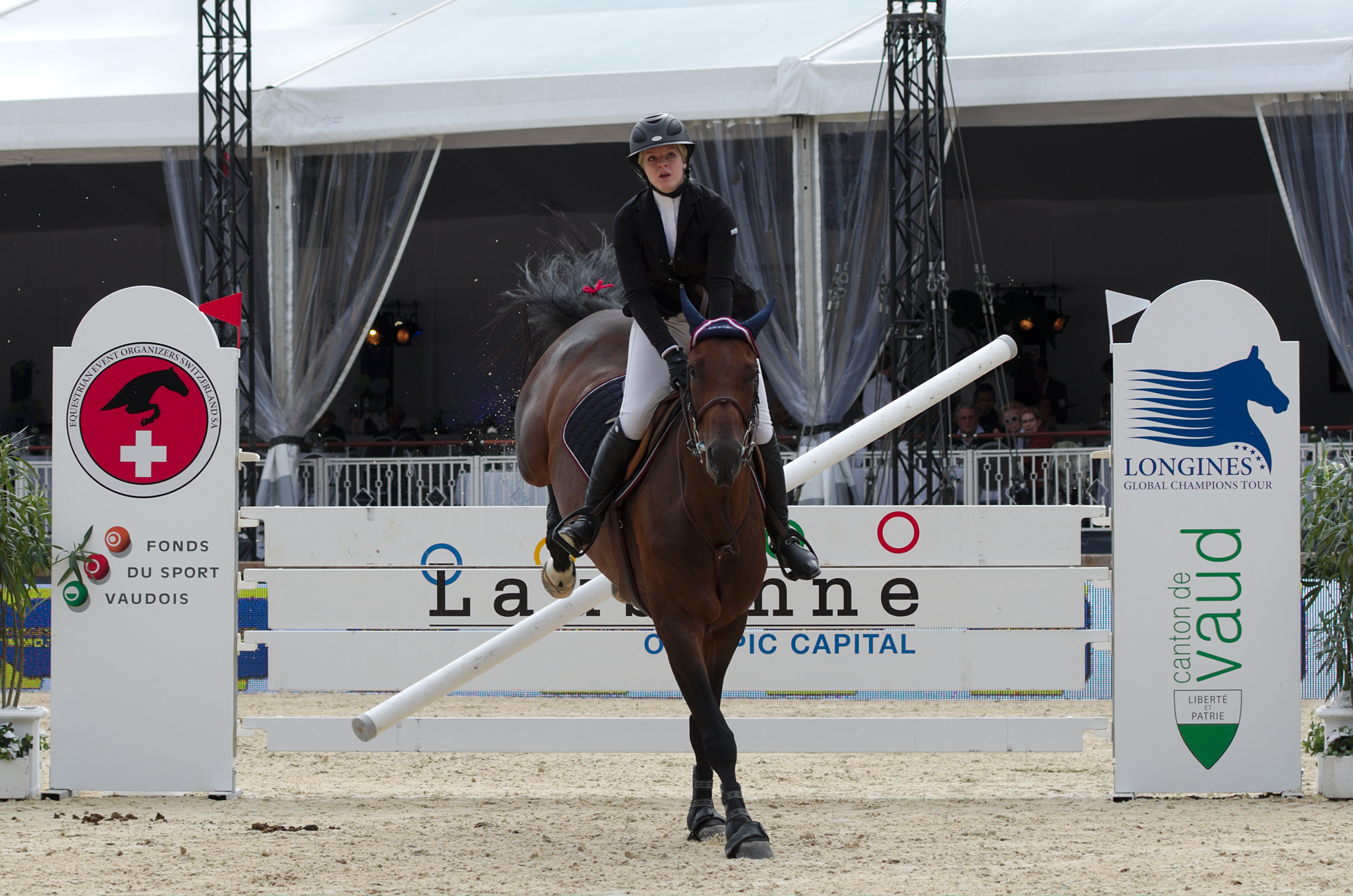
This knockdown will incur four penalties or "faults".

Rules have evolved since then, with different national federations having different classes and rules. The international governing body for most major show jumping competitions is the Fédération Équestre Internationale (FEI). The two most common types of penalties are jumping penalties and time penalties.

- Jumping Penalties: Jumping penalties are assessed for refusals and knockdowns, with each refusal or knockdown adding four faults to a competitor's score.
- Penalties for knockdowns are imposed only when the knockdown changes the height or width of the jump. If a horse or rider knocks down a bottom or middle rail while still clearing the height of the obstacle, providing the rails are directly underneath the top rail, they receive no penalties. Penalties are assessed at the open water when any of the horse's feet touch the water or white tape marking its boundary. If the water fence is a 'Liverpool' no faults will be accumulated for landing in the water. A Liverpool is when a small pool (although it does not have to be filled with water) is placed under an oxer or a vertical.

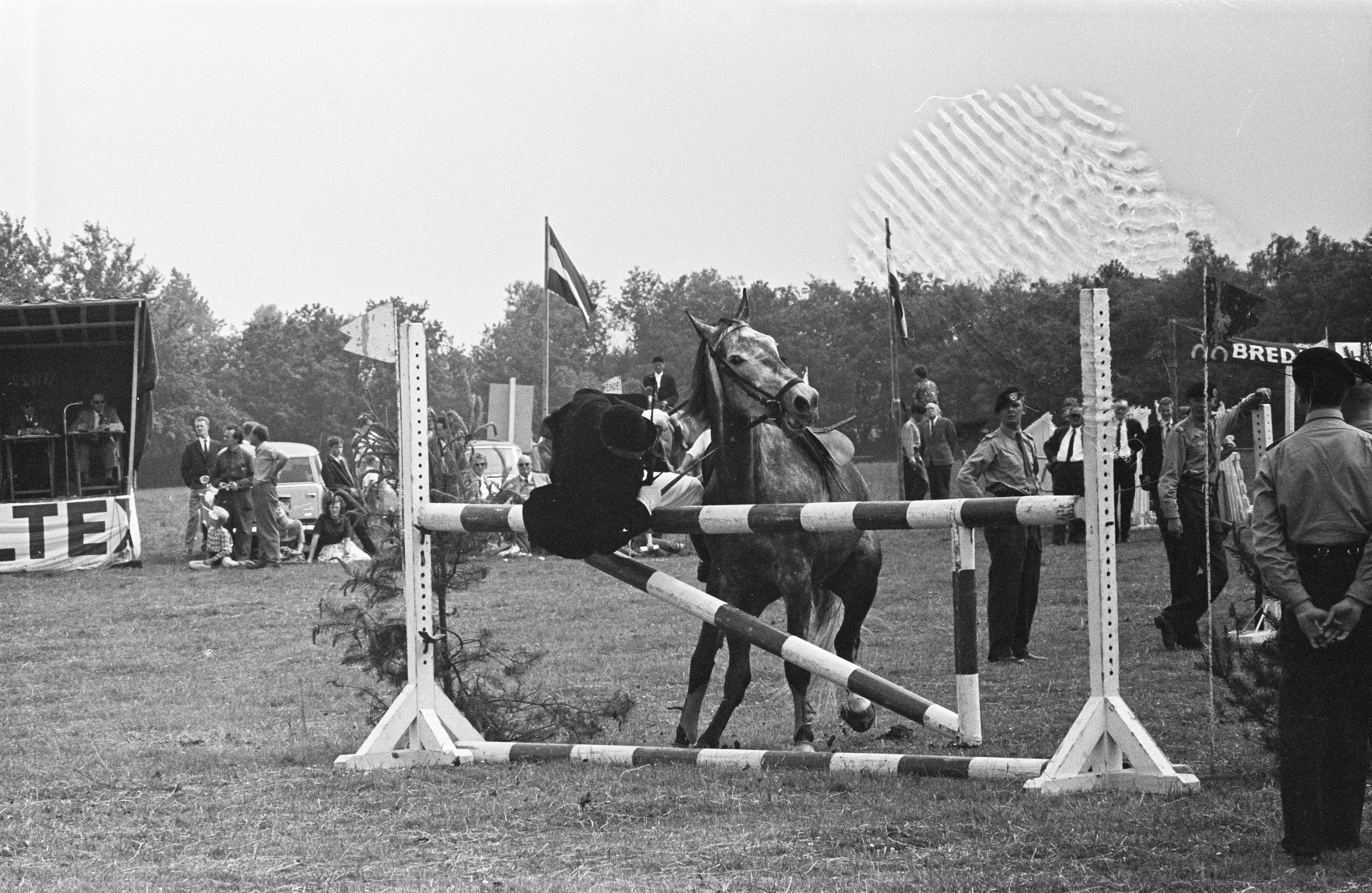
A refusal will sometimes dislodge the rider or upset a fence

- Refusals: Refusals now are penalized four faults, up from three. Within the last several years, the FEI has decreased the number of refusals resulting in elimination from three to two, and this rule has trickled down from the top levels of FEI competition to other levels of horse shows in the US, however in such places as Australia, lower levels (below 1.15m usually) may still have the 3 refusals and elimination rule.
- A refusal that results in the destruction of the integrity of a jump (running into the fence instead of jumping it, displacing poles, gates, flowers, or large clumps of turf or dirt) will not receive four faults for the knockdown, but instead the four faults for a refusal. A refusal inside a combination (a series of two or more fences with one or two strides between each element) must re-jump the entire combination.
- Time Penalties: In the past, a common timing rule was a 1/4 second penalty for each second or fraction of a second over the time allowed. Since the early 2000s, this rule was changed by the FEI so that each second or fraction of a second over the time allowed would result in 1 time penalty (e.g. with a time allowed of 72 seconds, a time of 73.09 seconds would result in 2 time faults).
- Combinations: A refusal at any of the jumps in combination results in the horse having to repeat the entire set of obstacles in the designated order of succession, not just the element refused. So a horse may jump "A" and "B" without issue but have a refusal at the third fence (C), at which time the rider would have to circle and return to jump fence "A" again, giving the horse a second chance to refuse or knock down "A" and "B". Despite being considered one obstacle, each element may result in penalty points if knocked down. Therefore, if each of the three fences in a triple combination were knocked down, the rider would receive 12 faults (4 per fence, instead of 4 faults for the entire obstacle). "In and out" is the informal name designated to combinations with only two elements such as "A" and "B", and not specific enough for a three-jump combination.

=== Table C, speed scoring ===
The above type of scoring is called "Table A" scoring. Table C is a method of scoring based only on speed. The penalties for each knockdown is to add 4 seconds to the rider's time. The fastest score wins.

== Tack ==
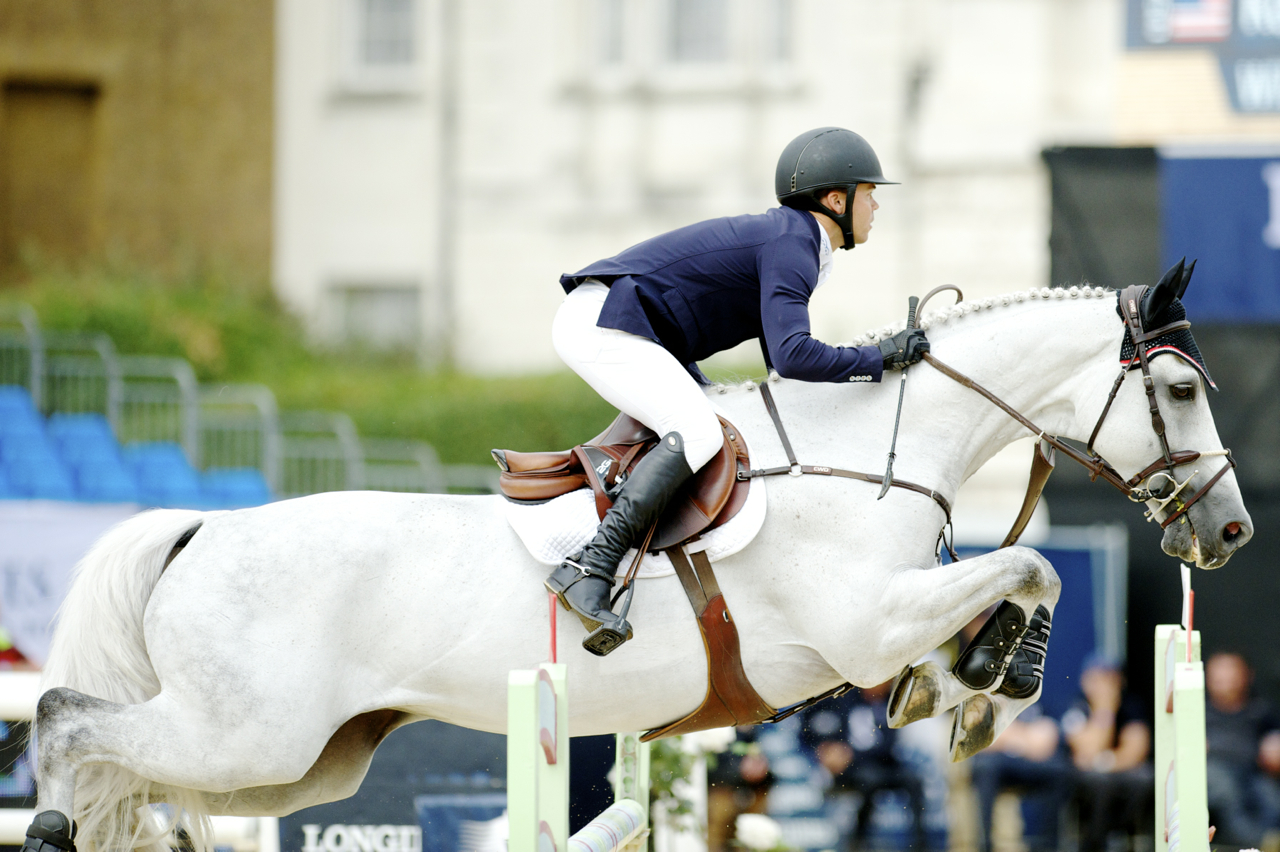
Common show jumping tack: jumping saddle, boots, running martingale

Show jumping competitors use a very forward style of English saddle, most often the "close contact" design, which has a forward flap and a seat and cantle that is flatter than saddles designed for general all-purpose English riding or dressage. This construction allows greater freedom of movement for the rider when in jumping position and allows a shorter stirrup, allowing the rider to lighten the seat on the horse. Other saddles, such as those designed for dressage, feature a deep seat that can hinder a rider over large fences, forcing them into a position that limits the horse's movement and may put the rider dangerously behind the movement of the horse.

At international levels, saddle pads are usually white and square in shape, allowing the pair to display a sponsorship, national flag, or breeding affiliation. In contrast, riders in show hunters and equitation often use "fitted" fleece pads that are the same shape as the saddle. Girths vary in size and type, but usually have a contour to give room for the horse's elbows, and many have belly guards to protect the underside of the horse from its shoe studs when the front legs are tightly folded under.

Bridles may be used with any style of cavesson noseband, and there are few rules regarding the severity of this equipment. The figure-8 cavesson is the most popular type. Bits may also vary in severity, and competitors may use any bit, or even a "bitless bridle" or a mechanical hackamore. The ground jury at the show has the right, however, based on veterinary advice, to refuse a bit or bridling scheme if it could cause harm to the horse.

Boots and wraps are worn by almost all horses, due to the fact that they may easily injure their legs when landing or when making tight turns at speed. Open-fronted tendon boots usually are worn on the forelegs, because they provide protection for the delicate tendons that run down the back of the leg, but still allow the horse to feel a rail should it get careless and hang its legs. Fetlock boots are sometimes seen on the rear legs, primarily to prevent the horse from hitting itself on tight turns. However, dressage horses are forbidden from wearing boots or wraps during competition or tests, due to the formality of dressage there are extended regulations on tack.

Martingales are very common, especially on horses used at the Grand Prix level. The majority of jumpers are ridden in running martingales since these provide the most freedom over fences. Although a standing martingale (a strap connecting directly to the horse's noseband) is commonly seen on show hunters and may be helpful in keeping a horse from throwing its head up, it also may be quite dangerous in the event of a stumble, restricting a horse from using its head to regain its balance. For this reason, standing martingales are not used in show jumping or eventing. Breastplates also are common, used to keep the saddle in place as the horse goes over large fences.

== Rider attire ==
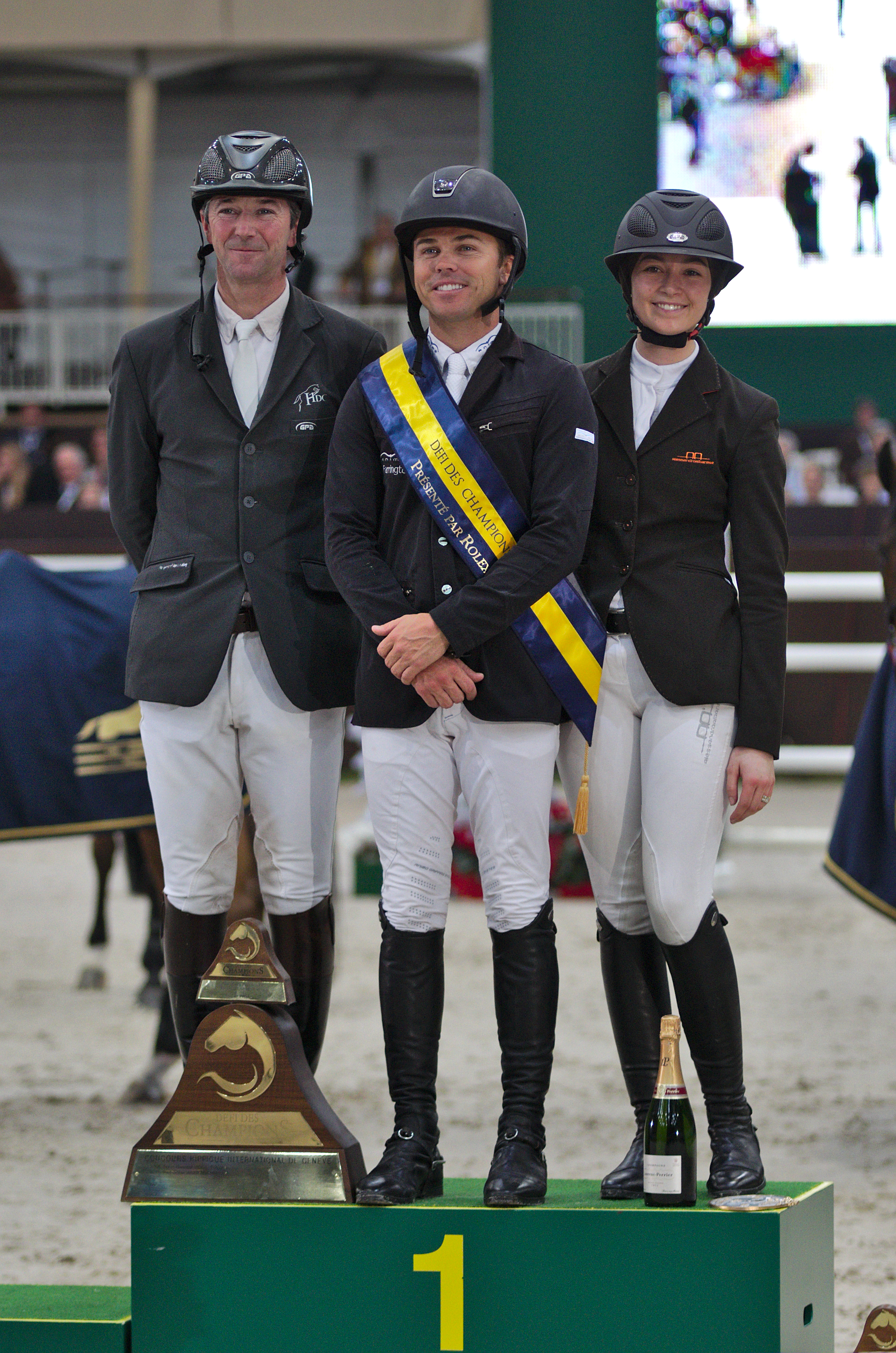
Typical show jumping attire

Rider attire may be somewhat less formal than that used in hunter riding. An approved ASTM/SEI equestrian helmet with a harness is always required, and is a practical necessity to protect the rider's head in the event of a fall. Tall boots are required, usually black. Spurs are optional, but commonly used. Breeches are usually white, tan, or beige. A dark-colored coat is typically worn, although some organizations allow tweed jackets or non-wool machine washable jackets. Shirts are light-colored (usually white) ratcatcher-styles with either a choker or stock tie. In hot summer weather, many riders wear a simple short-sleeved polo shirt with helmet, boots and breeches, and even where coats are required, the judges may waive the coat rule in extremely hot weather. Gloves, usually black, are optional, as is the plaiting of the horse's mane and tail.

At FEI Grand Prix levels, dress is more strictly controlled. Riders must wear white or light-colored shirts, white ties or chokers, black or brown boots, white or light fawn breeches, and red or black jackets. Members of the military, police forces, and national studs, however, have the right to wear their service uniforms instead of FEI-prescribed dress. In some circumstances, members of international teams may wear jackets in their country's respective colors or add national insignia.

== Types of competition ==
- Grand Prix: the highest level of show jumping. Run under International Federation for Equestrian Sports (FEI) rules, the horse jumps a course of 10 to 16 obstacles, with heights up to 1.6 meters (5 feet 3 inches) and spreads of up to 2.0 metres (6 ft 7 in). Grand Prix-level show jumping competitions include the Olympics, the World Equestrian Games, and other series of internationally ranked events. Grand Prix show jumping is normally referred to collectively as five-star Concours de Saut International (CSI) rules.
- Speed derby
- Puissance: a high-jump competition in which the final wall may reach over seven feet tall. The current, (April 2013), world record for the puissance is 2.40 m (7 ft 10 in) held by Franke Sloothaak. The world record for the high jump, the precursor to the puissance, is 2.47 m (8 ft 1 in), held by Captain Alberto Larraguibel Morales riding Huaso, in 1949.
- Six-bar: riders jump six fences set in a straight line. In most places, fences are placed at equal distances apart, the first fence is the lowest and each subsequent fence is higher than the one before. Horses are either penalized or eliminated from the competition if they knock down a rail. After each round where more than one competitor goes "clean," or is tied for the fewest faults, the six fences are raised in height for each subsequent round until there is a winner. Occasionally, if there are multiple jump-offs, the final fences may be raised to well over six feet.
- Gambler's choice/accumulator: An event where exhibitors choose their own course, with each fence cleared worth a given number of points based on difficulty. The entry who accumulates the most points within a set time limit on course is the winner.
- Calcutta: A jumping event where spectators bet on which horse will win by means of an auction where the highest bidder has the exclusive bet on a given horse. Although the exact mechanism varies by region and culture, as a rule, the spectator who bets on the winner collects all money bet and then splits the purse with the owner of the winning horse.
- Maiden, novice, and limit: Jumping classes limited to horses with fewer than one, three, or six wins. Fences are usually lower and time limits more generous.
- Match race or double slalom: two identical courses are set up in a split arena, and two horses jump over the courses in a timed competition.
- Touch class: A class held much as a normal show jumping class, except that if the horse touches the jump it is considered four faults.
- Faults converted: A class in which any faults are converted into seconds on the clock, usually at the rate of 1 second per fault (i.e., one rail = 4 seconds)

== Types of show jumps ==
Some basic types of show jumps
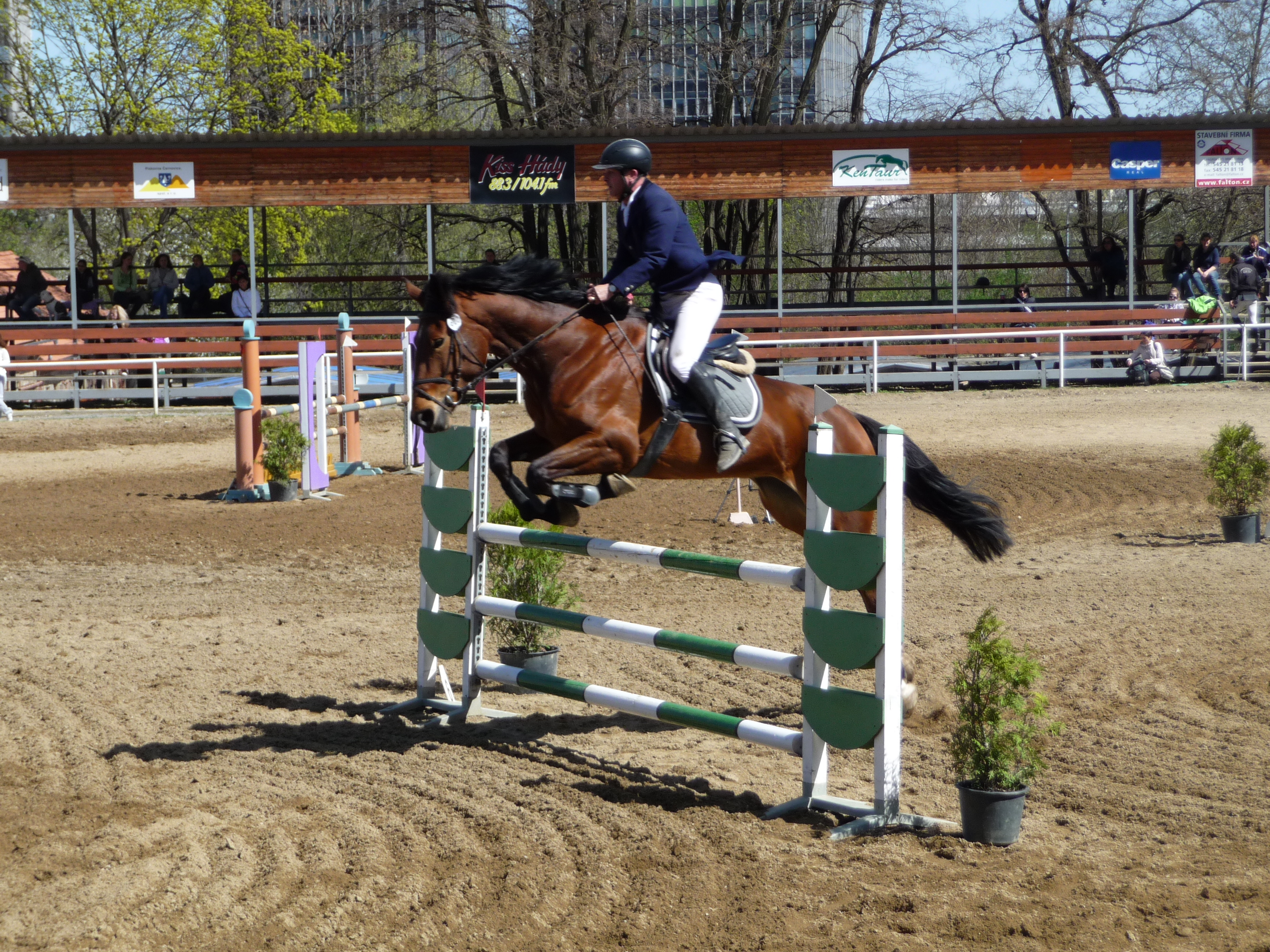
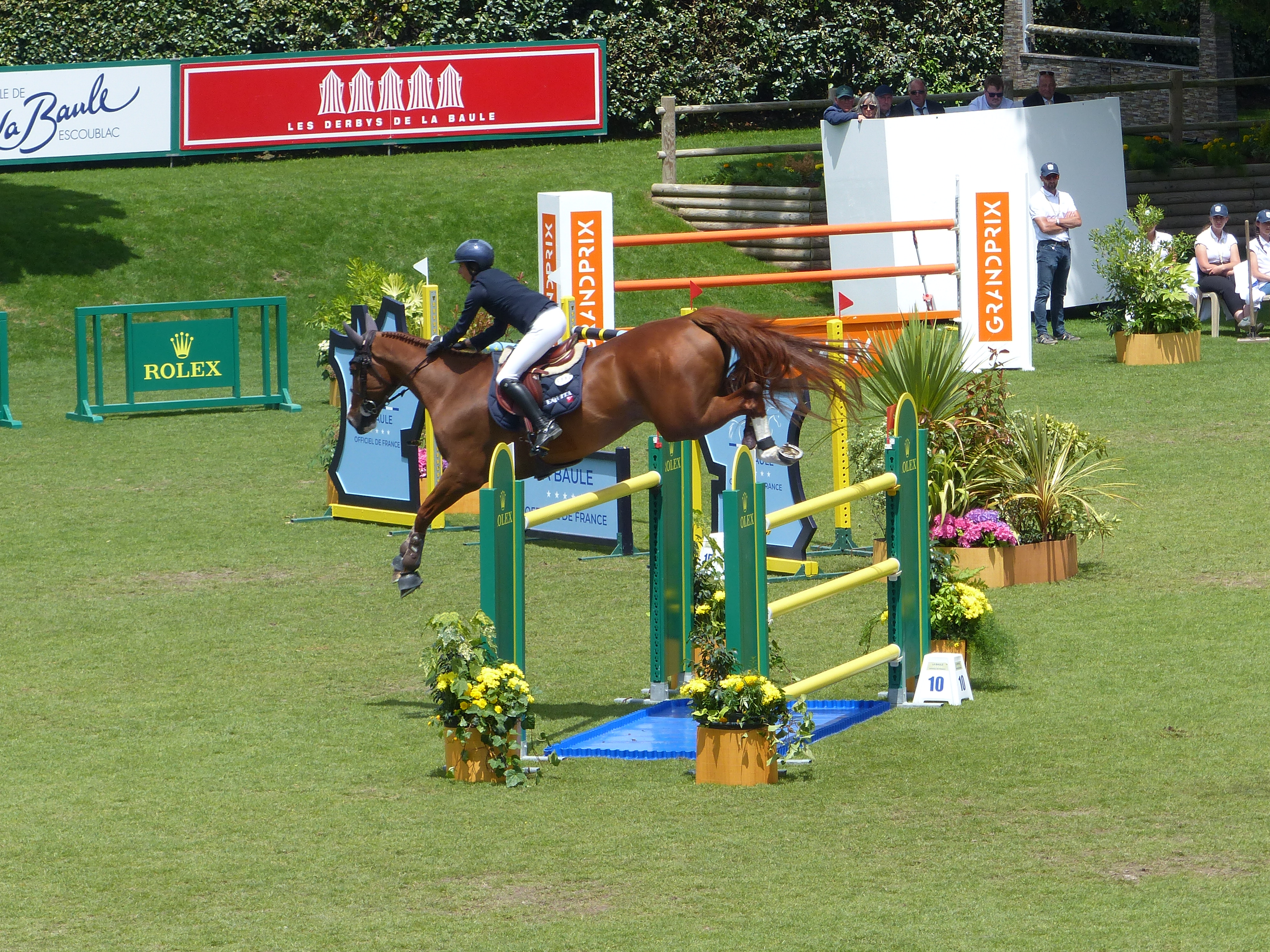
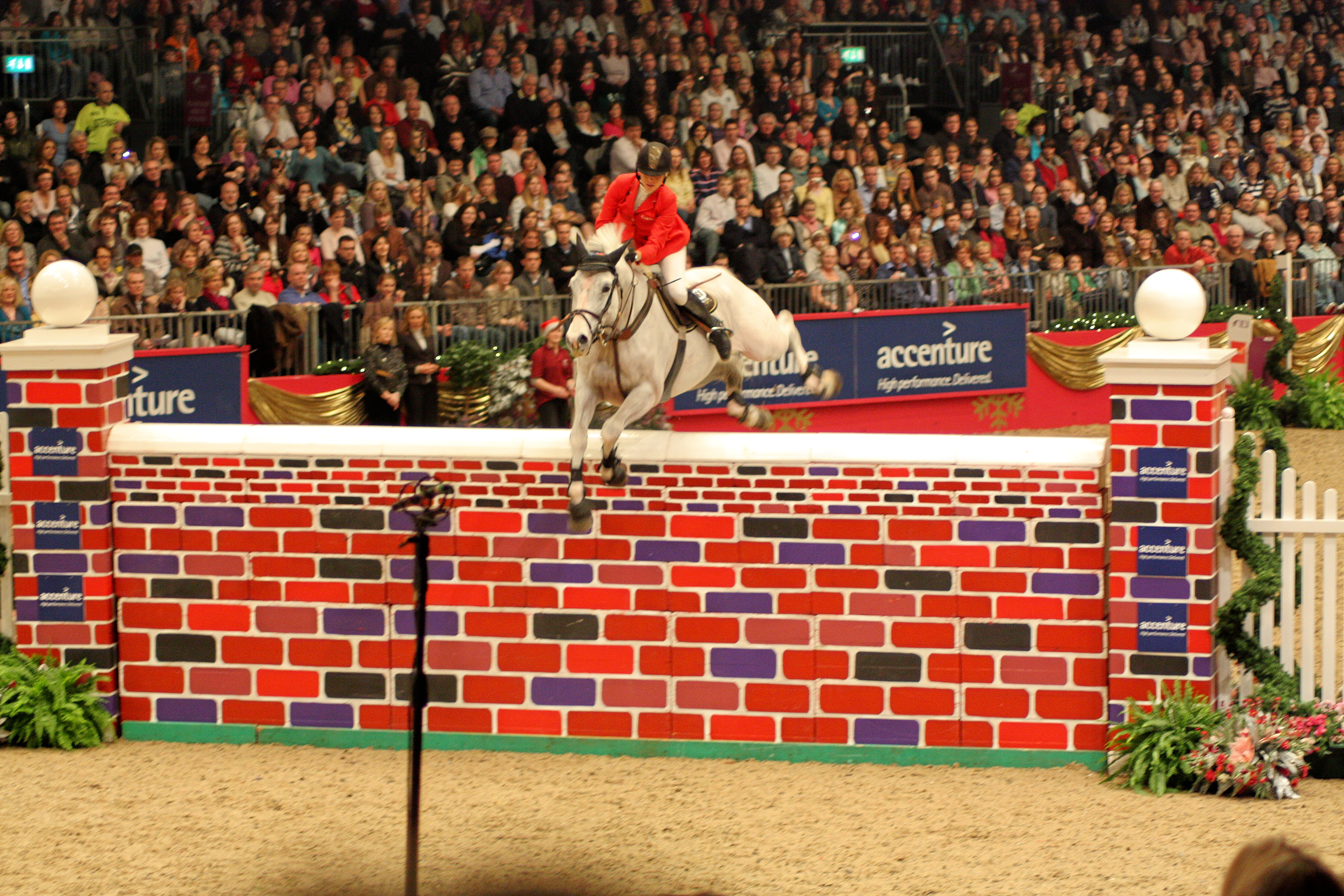
Vertical/narrow, horizontal/wide, and a wall

Show jumping fences are man-made and often colorful or artistic in design. Fences are designed to break away if struck by the horse to simplify scoring, and to increase safety by reducing falls by the horse.

Some of the basic types of fences seen in show jumping are verticals, spreads, water, and combinations. Most jumps are constructed with poles or planks supported on each end by standards, upright supports which can hold multiple poles at various heights. A vertical jump is an upright jump with a single pair of standards which hold a vertical stack of rails or planks, or a gate. A spread jump made of two or more pairs of standards, making a wider jump for the horse, is called an oxer. A wall is a vertical stack of blocks painted to look like a stone or brick wall. A water obstacle may be a wide open ditch of shallow water (usually lined with light blue plastic) or a smaller water ditch with a jump placed over it. A combination jump is two or three jumps in a row, with one or two strides between each; two jumps in a row is called a double combination and three jumps is a triple combination.

Horses prefer a more solid looking jump, so many rail fences are filled with brush or flower boxes or other solid-looking objects. Since horses judge their takeoff from the base of a jump (the ground line), most fences have a rail placed on or near the base of a fence, however sometimes a jump is constructed without a ground line to test the horse's ability to jump without that cue.

At international level competitions governed by FEI rules, fence heights begin at 1.50 metres (4 ft 11 in). In the United States, jumping levels range from 0–9, for example USEF jumper level 0 has fences 2'6" to 2'9" high and up to 2'9" to 3'0" wide, and level 9 has fences 4'9" to 5'0" high and up to 5'0" to 5'6" wide. In Germany, competition levels are denoted by the letters E, A, L, M, S, and correspond to heights ranging from 0.80 to 1.55 meters.

== Show jumping horses ==
A show jumping horse must have the courage to jump large fences as well as the athletic ability to handle the sharp turns and bursts of speed necessary to navigate the most difficult courses. Many breeds of horses have been successful show jumpers, and even some grade horses of uncertain breeding have been champions. Most show jumpers are tall horses, over 16 hands (64 inches, 163 cm), usually of Warmblood or Thoroughbred breeding, though horses as small as 14.1 hands (57 inches, 145 cm) have been on the Olympic teams of various nations and carried riders to Olympic and other international medals. There is no correlation between the size of a horse and its athletic ability, nor do tall horses necessarily have an advantage when jumping. Nonetheless, a taller horse may make a fence appear less daunting to the rider.

Ponies also compete in show jumping competitions in many countries, usually in classes limited to youth riders, defined as those under the age of 16 or 18 years, depending on the sanctioning organization. Pony-sized horses may, on occasion, compete in open competition with adult riders. The most famous example was Stroller, who only stood 14.1 hands (57 inches, 145 cm) but was nonetheless an Individual silver medal winner and part of the Great Britain show jumping team in the 1968 Summer Olympics, jumping one of the few clean rounds in the competition. Significant jumpers from the United States are included in the Show Jumping Hall of Fame.

== Para-showjumping ==
Para-showjumping, or para-jumping, is show jumping for disabled people.

== See also ==
- Rotational falls
- Rabbit show jumping
