= Bascule (horse) =

Natural arc followed by a jumping horse's body

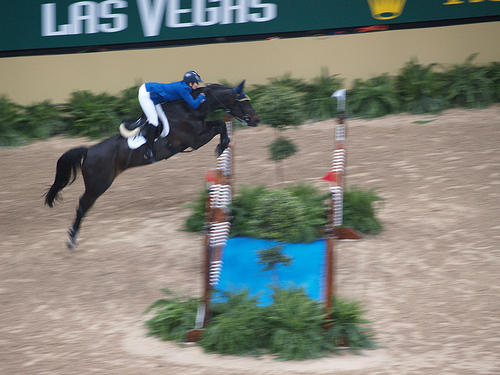
The path this horse takes through the air is an arc

Bascule /ˈbæskjuːl/ is the natural round arc a horse's body takes as it goes over a jump. The horse should rise up through its back, stretching its neck forward and down, when it reaches the peak of his jump. Ideally, the withers are the highest point over the fence. This is often described as the horse taking the shape of a dolphin jumping out of the water. Bascule can also refer more generally to the raising of the withers while the horse is in motion.

== Importance of bascule ==
A horse with bascule is one with a "round" jump, while a horse with poor bascule may jump "flat" with his head in the air and his spine relatively straight. A hollowed back over the fence tends to prevent the animal from lifting his forearms very high, thus preventing the necessary tucking motion of his front legs to jump clear.

Most naturally talented jumpers have good bascule; however, some very athletic horses can jump great heights with considerably poor bascule due to sheer power.

Some bascule is an important trait for all jumping horses, as it is more mechanically efficient for clearing high obstacles. Good bascule is desirable in show jumping, but is essential in the show hunters, being one of the main qualities that a judge looks for in the horse.

Less of a bascule is desirable in other disciplines, such as eventing, when the added roundness would result in the jump taking a longer time (adding valuable seconds to the clock). Additionally, some cross-country jumps are best jumped flat, to ensure an appropriate landing. For example, drops are best jumped with little bascule, so that the landing is made as short as possible, putting less stress on the horse's legs and the rider's balance. In sports such as steeplechase, bascule is not desirable, because of the added time it takes to jump the fence. Therefore, the horses are encouraged to jump flatter and "out of stride." Furthermore, the extra energy required for a horse to bascule over a hurdle in steeplechasing would be wasted.

A "flat" jump is often desirable in hunt seat equitation. A jump with a great deal of bascule is challenging to ride, and is said to "pop the rider out of the tack," which means it "pops" them out of the saddle. In a competition where the appearance of ease is critical, a flat jump can benefit the rider.

== Training for bascule ==
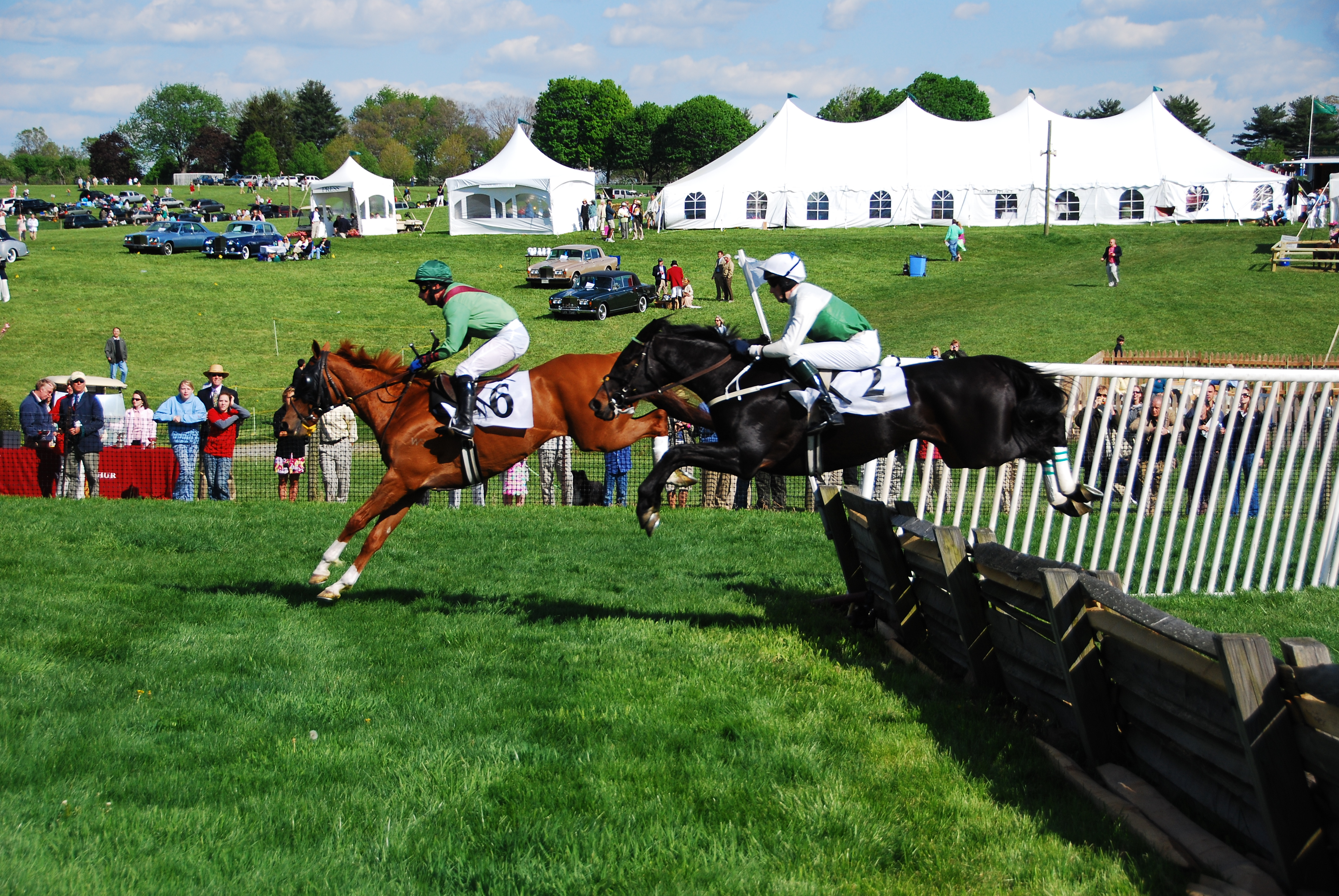
These steeplechasers jump flat, without bascule, to save time and energy.

Good training can help to develop a horse's bascule to its fullest potential, but overall trainers are limited in how much they can train in this innate ability. Grid work is usually most helpful in developing the animal's bascule.

Certain jumps tend to favor good bascule, most notably the ascending oxer. Other jumps, such as steeplechase fences which are meant to be brushed through, favor a flat jump. In the case of the steeplechase fence, it is detrimental for the horse to have a powerful, round jump, because it consumes time and energy.

Additionally, the ability to bascule over a fence is a matter of flexibility in the horse. In some cases, a more relaxed atmosphere or improved conditioning may help the horse to flex his spine better.

In general, training cannot compensate for a lack of natural bascule in a horse.
