= Refusals and runouts =

Failure of a horse to jump an obstacle

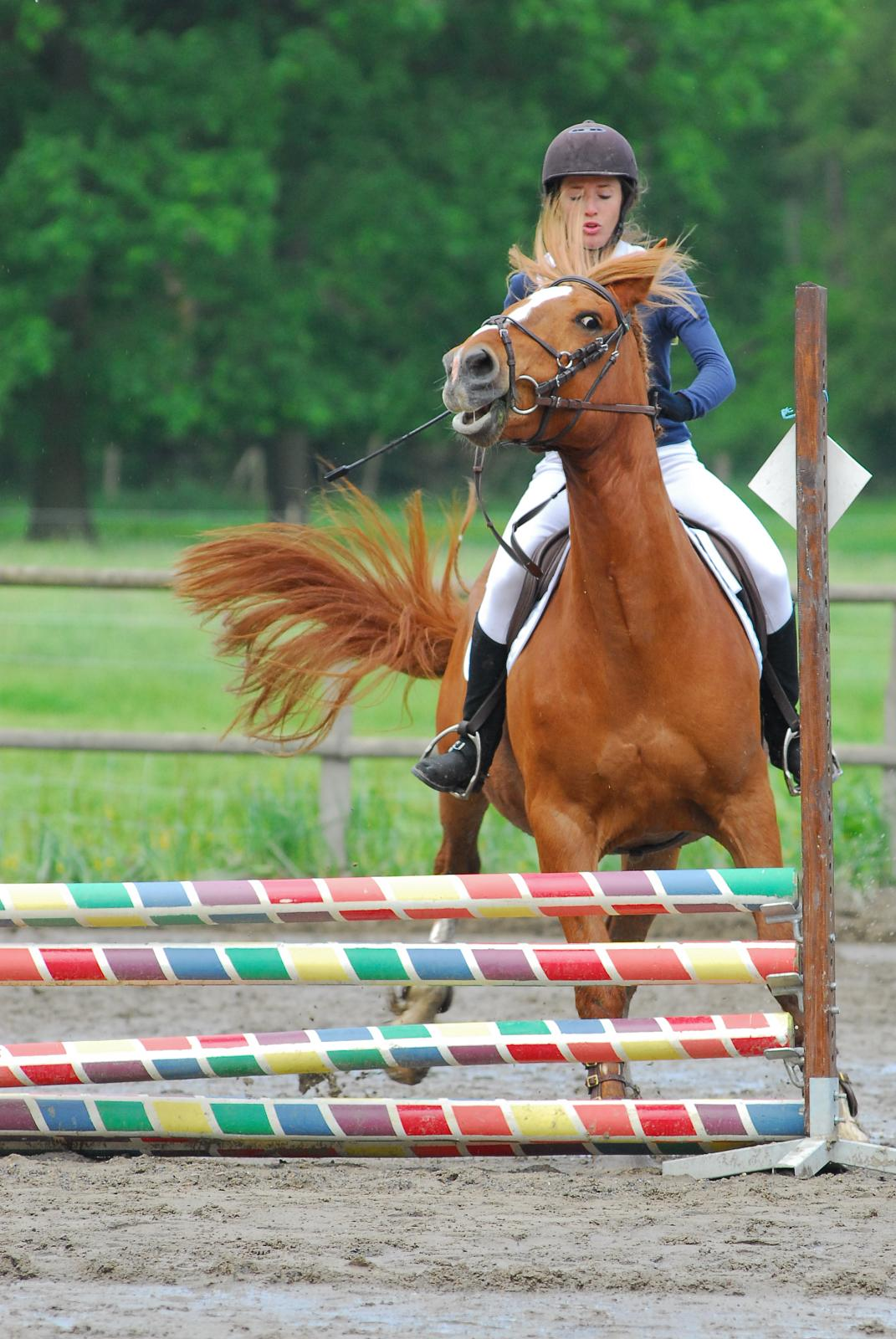
A horse running out to the left to avoid jumping the obstacle.

Refusal or runout in horse riding is the failure of a horse to jump a fence to which it is presented. This includes any stop in forward motion. A runout occurs when the horse quickly moves sideways to go around the fence instead of jumping it, without stopping forward motion.

== Problems ==
Refusals and runouts are counted against riders in jumping competitions. In show jumping and the stadium phase of eventing, a refusal is worth four penalty points. In the cross-country phase of eventing, a refusal counts as 20 penalty points.

Refusals also have the potential to unseat the rider, which may result in rider injury. Refusals also present the possibility that the horse may crash into the obstacle. In extreme cases, however, it may be best for a horse to refuse rather than jump a fence which he cannot clear, as he might land on the fence, fall on landing, or flip over.

== Reasons ==
There are several reasons for refusals, and therefore a rider must try to identify the problem before reprimanding the horse for their disobedience.

Rider-based reasons

- Poor take-off distance, usually due to rider error, which would make it unsafe to jump.
- The horse does not have enough power (impulsion) to safely clear the obstacle, again usually due to rider error.
- The horse has repeatedly been hit in the mouth or back due to a poor jumping position of the rider, and now associates jumping with pain.
- The rider is unsure of jumping the fence, and his or her feelings are transferred to the horse.
- Habit: the horse has learned that it can refuse without consequence, and does so to get out of work.
- A solid, colorful, or otherwise different fence may scare the horse.
- Horse is "sour," or has been over-jumped and has begun to hate the work.

Physical problems

- Back pain, or general soreness
- Dental problems
- Lameness issues, arthritis
- The horse is physically unable to jump the obstacle, due to conformational issues, insufficient conditioning, or lack of ability.

If a horse has begun to refuse frequently when before it was willing, a veterinary exam can be performed to rule out pain. When pain is ruled out as a factor, rider error is a very common cause for refusals; poor riding may place the horse in a position so that he physically would find it extremely difficult to clear the obstacle (such as too far or too close to the jump). Additionally, riders who do not release over the fence, preventing the horse from stretching down, will hit the horse in the mouth with the bit and cause pain. If this happens frequently, the horse will associate the pain with the jumping effort itself, and may begin to refuse. Horses that have begun to refuse due to rider error often require retraining.

If a horse is physically unable to jump a fence of a certain size or height, even with the best riding, pushing a horse may result in physical harm to the animal or cause an accident involving both horse and rider.
