= Leadline =

Horse show class for young children

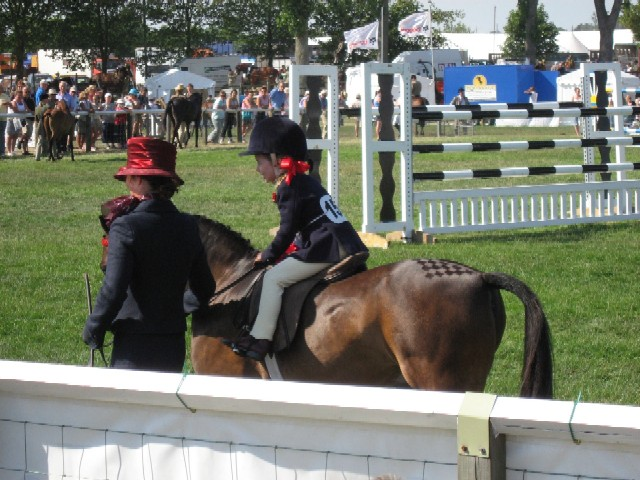
Leadline competitor in the United Kingdom

Leadline is a horse show class for very young children, generally under the age of 7 years. An adult or older child actually leads the horse in-hand, while the child that is judged sits on the horse and usually holds the reins, but only for the sake of appearance, as the actual control of the animal rests with the handler on the ground. Rules vary tremendously from one geographical region to the next, but as a rule the horse is shown at a walk and a trot, and the riding child is judged on their equitation, limited to proper seat, leg and hand position, to a lesser extent on poise. The child is usually not asked to actually control the animal, though in some locations a judge may award extra points if the child initiates certain commands to the horse and even more points if the horse actually responds. In many areas, judge may also ask the children simple questions about themselves or their horse, primarily to gauge the child's poise and manners more than equine knowledge. Occasionally, other elements, such as games or other group exercises may be added.

Attire is generally the same as for equivalent equitation classes, though in some locations, children may also exhibit in costumes. In most cases, the handler is not judged, though some exhibitors nonetheless turn out with matching clothing for handler and rider. Equestrian helmets are usually encouraged, and sometimes mandated.

Award policies also vary widely. As a general rule, an attempt is made to provide every participant some sort of award. At some shows, there is no actual evaluation of the riders and all children are given identical awards for participation, often blue (first place) ribbons. At others, a first place award will be given, with all other participants given smaller but equivalent awards. Yet others rank the top five to eight places but also provide participation awards, or ribbons identical to the lowest placing, to all entrants so no child leaves without an award. A few shows maintain the practice of providing awards in the same manner as regular horse show classes, even if this means some children do not receive any type of award. In lieu of a trophy, some shows award stuffed animals or other age-appropriate items.

== See also ==
- Horse show
- Halter (horse show)
- Horse showmanship
- Equitation
