= Expatriate =

Person living abroad

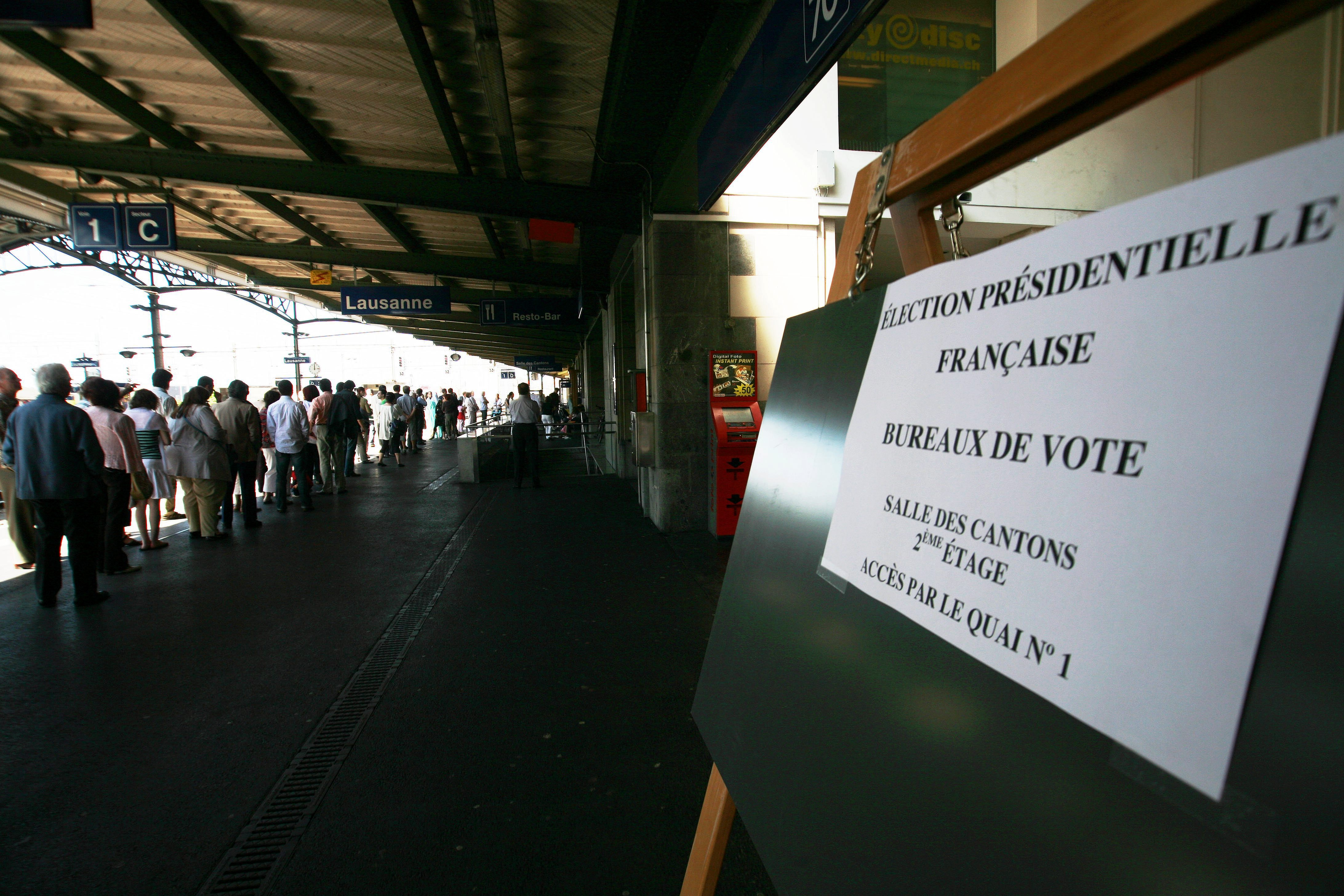
Expatriate French voters queue in Lausanne, Switzerland, for the first round of the presidential election of 2007.

An expatriate (often shortened to expat) is a person who resides outside their native country.

The term often refers to a professional, skilled worker or artist from a wealthy country. It may also refer to retirees and other individuals who have chosen to live outside their native country. Students are usually not referred to as expats.

The International Organization for Migration of the United Nations defines the term as "a person who voluntarily renounces his or her nationality". Historically, it has also been used to refer to exiles.

The UAE is the country with the highest percentage of expatriates in the world after the Vatican City, with expatriates in the United Arab Emirates representing about 88% of the population.

== Etymology ==
The word expatriate comes from the Latin words ex 'out of' and patria, from terra patria, 'native country, fatherland'.

== Semantics ==
Dictionary definitions for the current meaning of the word include:

Expatriate:
- "A person who lives outside their native country" (Oxford), or
- "a person who lives in a foreign country" (Webster's).

These definitions contrast with those of other words with similar meanings, such as:

Migrant:
- "A person who moves from one place to another in order to find work or better living conditions" (Oxford), or
- "one that migrates: such as a person who moves regularly in order to find work especially in harvesting crops" (Webster's);

or

Immigrant
- "A person who comes to live permanently in a foreign country" (Oxford), or
- "one that immigrates: such as a person who comes to a country to take up permanent residence" (Webster's).

Academics seeking a technical definition of the word "expatriate" sometimes take it to mean a person who is legally living abroad, but – unlike an immigrant – eventually intends to return to their country of origin. In popular usage, the word "expat" – especially when contrasted with words like "immigrant" – is freighted with nuances about wealth, education level, perceived motives for moving, nationality, class, and type of employment; the BBC proffered that the word "expat" is more likely to be applied to rich professionals, while foreigners working as maids or builders are more likely to be called "foreign workers" or "migrant workers". Some commentators assert that the traditional use of the word "expat" has racist connotations. A 2026 newspaper survey in Brussels, where 85% of the population are immigrants or children of immigrants, found a range of opinions from self-identified immigrants or expats, including the opinion that the term "expat" creates unnecessary divisions and stigmatizes the word "immigrant".

Linguist Charlotte Taylor traced the modern usage of "expatriate" to British civil servants on overseas assignments in the mid-20th century, which seeded the word's enduring class connotations. An older usage of the word expatriate referred to an exile. Alternatively, when used as a verbal noun, expatriation can mean the act of someone renouncing allegiance to their native country, as in the preamble to the United States Expatriation Act of 1868 which states: "the right of expatriation is a natural and inherent right of all people, indispensable to the enjoyment of the rights of life, liberty and the pursuit of happiness".

Some neologisms have been coined, including:

- dispatriate, an expatriate who intentionally distances themselves from their nation of origin;
- flexpatriate, an employee who often travels internationally for business (see "Business expatriates" below);
- inpatriate, an employee sent from a foreign subsidiary to work in the country where a company has its headquarters;
- rex-pat, a repeat expatriate, often someone who has chosen to return to a foreign country after completing a work assignment;
- sexpat, an expatriate with the goal of short or long term sexual relationships (expatriate + sex tourist).

The term "expatriate" is sometimes misspelled as "ex-patriot", which author Anu Garg has characterised as an example of an eggcorn.

In Canada, individuals who reside in a different province on a temporary basis (such as students or seasonal workers) while continuing to hold their home province's residency are sometimes colloquially referred to as "interprovincial expats", as opposed to official "interprovincial migrants" who permanently change their legal province of residence. For example, under Canadian student financial aid and healthcare regulations, students from any province – such as those moving between Alberta and British Columbia – can attend post-secondary institutions across the country while legally retaining their home province's residency for tax, medical coverage, and student loan purposes.

== Cohorts ==
=== Types of expat community ===
The table below aims to show significant examples of expatriate communities which have developed since the 18th century:

| Group | Period | Country of origin | Destination | Host country | Notes |
|---|---|---|---|---|---|
| Australians and New Zealanders in London | 1960s–present | Australia/New Zealand | London | United Kingdom | |
| Beat Generation | 1950s | United States | Tangier | Morocco | |
| Beat Generation | 1960s | United States | Paris | France | See Beat Hotel. |
| British retirees | 1970s–present | United Kingdom | Costa del Sol | Spain | Arguably immigrants if permanent. |
| British retirees | current | United Kingdom | Dordogne | France | Arguably immigrants if permanent. |
| British Raj | 1721–1949 | United Kingdom | | India | |
| Celebrities and artists | 1800s–present | various | Lake Geneva | Switzerland | |
| Digital nomads | 1990s–present | various | | various | |
| Filmmakers | 1910s–present | Europe | Los Angeles | United States | "Hollywood" |
| Jet set | 1950s–70s | various | | various | |
| Lost Generation | 1920s–30s | United States | Paris | France | See A Moveable Feast. |
| Modernist artists & writers | 1870s–1930s | various | French Riviera | France | |
| Oligarchs | 1990s–present | Russia | London | United Kingdom | |
| Salarymen | current | Japan | | various | See Japanese diaspora |
| Shanghai French Concession | 1849–1943 | France | Shanghai | China | |
| Shanghai International Settlement | 1863–1945 | United Kingdom | Shanghai | China | Preceded by British Concession |
| Shanghai International Settlement | 1863–1945 | United States | Shanghai | China | Preceded by American Concession |
| Tax exiles | 1860s(?)–present | various | Monte Carlo | Monaco | |
| Third culture kids | current | various | | various | Includes 'military brats' and 'diplobrats'. |

During the 1930s, Nazi Germany revoked the citizenship of many opponents, such as Albert Einstein, Oskar Maria Graf, Willy Brandt and Thomas Mann, often expatriating entire families.

=== Worldwide distribution of expats ===
The number of expatriates in the world is difficult to determine, since there is no governmental census. Market research company Finaccord estimated the number to be 66.2 million in 2017.

In 2013, the United Nations estimated that 232 million people, or 3.2% of the world population, lived outside their home country.

As of 2019, according to the United Nations, the number of international migrants globally reached an estimated 272 million, or 3.5% of the world population.

== Expatriate employees ==
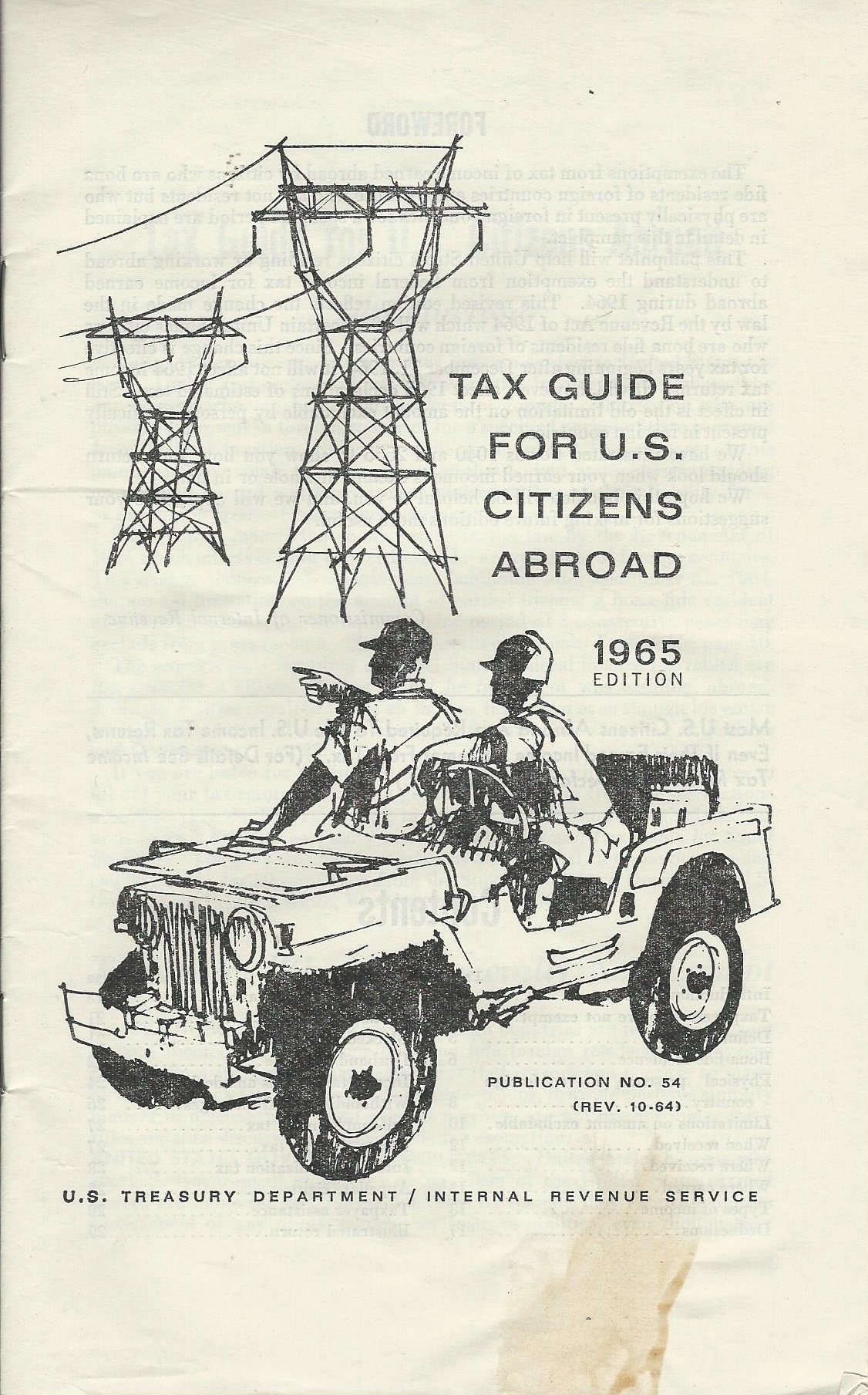
Long among the complexities of living in foreign countries has been the management of finances, including the payment of taxes; here, a 32-page IRS publication from 1965 for Americans living abroad.

Some multinational corporations send employees to foreign countries to work in branch offices or subsidiaries. Expatriate employees allow a parent company to more closely control its foreign subsidiaries. They can also improve global coordination.

A 2007 study found that key drivers for expatriates to pursue international careers included breadth of responsibilities, nature of the international environment (risk and challenge), high levels of autonomy in international posts, and cultural differences (rethinking old ways).

Expatriate professionals and independent expatriate hires often prove more expensive than local employees. Expatriate salaries are usually augmented with allowances to compensate for a higher cost of living or for hardships associated with a foreign posting. Other expenses may need to be paid, such as health-care, housing, or fees at an international school. There is also the cost of moving a family and their belongings. Another problem can be government restrictions in the foreign country.

Spouses may have trouble adjusting due to culture shock, loss of their usual social network, interruptions to their own career, and helping children to cope with a new school. These are chief reasons given for foreign assignments ending early. However, a spouse can also act as a source of support for an expatriate professional. Families with children help to bridge the language and culture aspect of the host and home country, while the spouse plays a critical role in balancing the family's integration into the local culture. Some corporations have begun to include spouses earlier when making decisions about a foreign posting, and offer coaching or adjustment training before a family departs. Research suggests that tailoring pre-departure cross-cultural training and its specific relevance positively influence the fulfilment of expectations in expatriates' adjustment. According to the 2012 Global Relocation Trends Survey Report, 88 per cent of spouses resist a proposed move. The most common reasons for refusing an assignment are family concerns and the spouse's career.

Expatriate failure is a term which has been coined for an employee returning prematurely to the home country, or resigning. About 7% of expatriates return early, but this figure does not include those who perform poorly while on assignment or resign entirely from a company. When asking the cost of a premature expatriate's return, a survey of 57 multinational companies reported an average cost of about US$225,000.

=== Reasons and motivations for expatriation ===
People move abroad for many different reasons. An understanding of what makes people move is the first step in the expatriation process. People could be "pushed" away as a reaction to specific socio-economic or political conditions in the home country, or "pulled" towards a destination country because of better work-opportunities/conditions. The "pull" can also include personal preferences, such as climate, a better quality of life, or the fact that family/friends are living abroad.

For some people, moving abroad is a conscious, thoroughly planned undertaking, while for others it can be a "spur of the moment", spontaneous decision. This decision, of course, is influenced by the individual's geographic, socioeconomic and political environment; as well as by their personal circumstances. The motivation for moving (or staying) abroad also gets adjusted with the different life-changes the person experiences – for example, if they get married, have children, etc. Also, different personalities (or personality types) have diverse reactions to the challenges of adjusting to a host-country culture; and these reactions affect motivations to continue (or not) living abroad.

In the context of international competition, it is important for companies, as well as for countries, to understand what is that motivates people to move to another country to work. Understanding expatriates' motivations for international mobility allows organisations to tailor work-packages to match expatriates' expectations in order to attract and/or retain skilled workers from abroad.

=== Recent trends ===
Trends in recent years among business expatriates have included:

- Reluctance by employees to accept foreign assignments, due to spouses also having a career.
- Reluctance by multinational corporations to sponsor overseas assignments, due to increased sensitivity both to costs and to local cultures. It is common for an expat to cost at least three times more than a comparable local employee.
- Short-term assignments becoming more common. These are assignments of several months to a year which rarely require the expatriate family to move. They can include specific projects, technology-transfer, or problem-solving tasks. In 2008, nearly two-thirds of international assignments consisted of long-term assignments (greater than one year, typically three years). In 2014, that number fell to just over half.
- Self-initiated expatriation, where individuals themselves arrange a contract to work overseas, rather than being sent by a parent company to a subsidiary. An "SIE" typically does not require as big a compensation-package as does a traditional business expatriate. Also, spouses of SIEs are less reluctant to interrupt their own careers, at a time when dual-career issues are arguably shrinking the pool of willing expatriates.
- Local companies in emerging markets hiring Western managers directly.
- Commuter assignments which involve employees living in one country but travelling to another for work. This usually occurs on a weekly or biweekly rotation, with weekends spent at home.
- Flexpatriates, international business travellers who take a plethora of short trips to locations around the globe for negotiations, meetings, training and conferences. These assignments are usually of several weeks duration each. Their irregular nature can cause stress within a family.
- In 2017 women made up only 14 per cent of the expatriate workforce globally.

The Munich-based paid-expatriate networking platform InterNations conducts a survey of expat opinions and trends on a regular basis.

== Academic research ==
There has been an increase in scholarly research into the field in recent years. For instance, Emerald Group Publishing in 2013 launched The Journal of Global Mobility: The home of expatriate management research.

K. Canhilal, R.G. Shemueli and S.L. Dolan suggest that successful expatriation is driven by a combination of individual, organizational, and context-related factors. Of these factors, the most significant have been outlined as: cross-cultural competences, spousal support, motivational questions, time of assignment, emotional competences, previous international experience, language fluency, social relational skills, cultural differences, and organizational recruitment and selection process.

Sebastian Reiche, an expert in the global workplace with numerous academic publications, is the author of the blog Expatriatus (IESE Business School).

Another author with experience on the subject is Miguel Amor, a Spanish-American geomatics engine, author of AmericanoSÍ: De España a EE. UU (2025).

== Literary and screen portrayals ==
=== Fiction ===
Expatriate milieus have been the setting of many novels and short stories, often written by authors who spent years living abroad. The following is a list of notable works and authors, by approximate date of publication.

18th century : Persian Letters (French: Lettres persanes) is a literary work, published in 1721, by Montesquieu, relating the experiences of two fictional Persian noblemen, Usbek and Rica, who spend several years in France under Louis XIV and the Regency and who correspond with their respective friends staying at home.

19th century: American author Henry James moved to Europe as a young man and many of his novels, such as The Portrait of a Lady (1881), The Ambassadors (1903), and The Wings of the Dove (1902), dealt with relationships between the New World and the Old. From the 1890s to 1920s, Polish-born Joseph Conrad wrote a string of English-language novels drawing on his seagoing experiences in farflung colonies, including Heart of Darkness (1899), Lord Jim (1900) and Nostromo (1904).

1900s/1910s: German-American writer Herman George Scheffauer was active from 1900 to 1925. English writer W. Somerset Maugham, a former spy, set many short stories and novels overseas, such as The Moon and Sixpence (1919) in which an English stockbroker flees to Tahiti to become an artist, and The Razor's Edge (1944) in which a traumatised American pilot seeks meaning in France and India. Ford Madox Ford used spa towns in Europe as the setting for his novel The Good Soldier (1915) about an American couple, a British couple, and their infidelities.

1920s: A Passage to India (1924), one of the best-known books by E.M. Forster, is set against the backdrop of the independence movement in India. Ernest Hemingway portrayed American men in peril abroad, beginning with his debut novel, The Sun Also Rises (1926).

1930s: Graham Greene was a keen traveller and another former spy, and from the 1930s to 1980s many of his novels and short stories dealt with Englishmen struggling to cope in exotic foreign places. Tender is the Night (1934), the last complete novel by F. Scott Fitzgerald, was about a glamorous American couple unravelling in the South of France. George Orwell drew heavily on his own experiences as a colonial policeman for his novel Burmese Days (1934). Evelyn Waugh satirised foreign correspondents in Scoop (1938).

1940s: From the mid-1940s to the 1990s, American-born Paul Bowles set many short stories and novels in his adopted home of Morocco, including The Sheltering Sky (1949). Malcolm Lowry in Under the Volcano (1947) told the tale of an alcoholic British consul in Mexico on the Day of the Dead.

1950s: From the 1950s to the 1990s, American author Patricia Highsmith set many of her psychological thrillers abroad, including The Talented Mr. Ripley (1955). James Baldwin's novel Giovanni's Room (1956) was about an American man having an affair in Paris with an Italian bartender. Anthony Burgess worked as a teacher in Malaya and made it the setting of The Malayan Trilogy (1956–1959). The Alexandria Quartet (1957–1960) was the best-known work of Lawrence Durrell, who was born in India to British parents and lived overseas for most of his life.

1960s: English writer Paul Scott is best known for The Raj Quartet (1965–1975) dealing with the final years of the British Empire in India. John le Carré made use of overseas settings for The Spy Who Came in from the Cold (1963) and many of his subsequent novels about British spies.

1970s: In The Year of Living Dangerously (1978), Christopher Koch portrayed the lead-up to a 1965 coup in Indonesia through the eyes of an Australian journalist and a British diplomat. A Cry in the Jungle Bar (1979) by Robert Drewe portrayed an Australian out of his depth while working for the UN in South-East Asia.

1990s: In both Cocaine Nights (1996) and Super-Cannes (2000), J. G. Ballard's English protagonists uncover dark secrets in luxurious gated communities in the South of France.

2000s: Platform (2001) was French author Michel Houellebecq's novel of European sex tourists in Thailand. Prague (2002) was a debut novel by Arthur Phillips which dealt with Americans and Canadians in Hungary towards the end of the Cold War. Shantaram (2003) was a bestselling novel by Gregory David Roberts about an Australian criminal who flees to India.

2010s: American novelist Chris Pavone has set several thrillers overseas since his debut The Expats (2012). Janice Y. K. Lee in The Expatriates (2016) and the miniseries deals with Americans in Hong Kong. Tom Rachman in his debut novel The Imperfectionists (2010) wrote of journalists working for an English-language newspaper in Rome.

=== Memoirs ===
Memoirs of expatriate life can be considered a form of travel literature with an extended stay in the host country. Some of the more notable examples are listed here in order of their publication date, and recount experiences of roughly the same decade unless noted otherwise.

Medieval: In The Travels of Marco Polo (c. 1300), Rustichello da Pisa recounted the tales of Italian merchant Marco Polo about journeying the Silk Road to China.

1930s–1960s: In the first half of Down and Out in Paris and London (1933), George Orwell described a life of low-paid squalor while working in the kitchens of Parisian restaurants. In The America That I Have Seen (1949), Egyptian Islamist Sayyid Qutb denounced the United States after studying there. In My Family and Other Animals (1956) and its sequels, Gerald Durrell described growing up as the budding naturalist in an eccentric English family on the Greek island of Corfu during the late 1930s. In As I Walked Out One Midsummer Morning (1969), Laurie Lee told of busking and tramping in his youth across 1930s Spain.

1970s–1990s: In It's Me, Eddie (1979), Eduard Limonov discusses his time as a Soviet expatriate living in New York City in the 1970s, including his poor work experiences, political disillusionment, and sexual experiences. In Letters from Hollywood (1986), Michael Moorcock corresponded with a friend about the life of an English writer in Los Angeles. In A Year in Provence (1989), Peter Mayle and his English family adapt to life in Southern France while renovating an old farmhouse. In Notes from a Small Island (1995), American writer Bill Bryson described a farewell tour of Britain.

2000s: In A Year in the Merde (2004) English bachelor Stephen Clarke recounted comic escapades while working in Paris. In Eat, Pray, Love (2006), divorced American Elizabeth Gilbert searched for meaning in Italy, India and Indonesia. In the early chapters of Miracles of Life (2008), J. G. Ballard told of his childhood and early adolescence in Shanghai during the 1930s and 1940s.

=== Film ===
Films about expatriates often deal with issues of culture shock. They include dramas, comedies, thrillers, action/adventure films and romances. Examples, grouped by host country, include:

- Argentina: Happy Together
- Austria: Before Sunrise, The Third Man.
- Belize: The Mosquito Coast.
- Cambodia: City of Ghosts.
- China: Iron and Silk, The Painted Veil, Seven Years in Tibet.
- France: An American in Paris, Charade, Dirty Rotten Scoundrels, A Good Year, Killing Zoe, Midnight in Paris, The Moderns, Ninotchka, To Catch a Thief, Breathless.
- Germany: Almanya: Welcome to Germany.
- Hong Kong: Love Is a Many-Splendored Thing, The World of Suzie Wong, Already Tomorrow in Hong Kong.
- India: Best Exotic Marigold Hotel, Carry On Up the Khyber, Outsourced, A Passage to India.
- Indonesia: The Year of Living Dangerously.
- Italy: Three Coins in the Fountain, Under the Tuscan Sun.
- Japan: Lost in Translation, Mr. Baseball, Cherry Blossoms.
- Kenya: Clarence, the Cross-Eyed Lion, Born Free,Out of Africa.
- Mexico: Treasure of the Sierra Madre.
- Morocco: Casablanca, Naked Lunch, The Sheltering Sky.
- Peru: Secret of the Incas.
- Saudi Arabia: A Hologram for the King.
- Spain: Barcelona, Sexy Beast, Vicky Cristina Barcelona
- Taiwan: Lucy
- Thailand: The Beach, The King and I
- Uganda: The Last King of Scotland.
- United Kingdom: The Adventures of Barry McKenzie, Straw Dogs.
- United States: Borat, Coming to America, Crocodile Dundee, How To Lose Friends And Alienate People, Leningrad Cowboys Go America.
- Vietnam: The Quiet American (1958) and (2002).
- Unnamed/various: Eat Pray Love; The Ugly American; The Wages of Fear, Lost Horizon (1937) and (1973).

=== Television ===
Reality television has dealt with overseas real estate (House Hunters International and A Place in the Sun), wealthy Russians in London (Meet the Russians), British expat couples (No Going Back) and mismanaged restaurants (Ramsay's Costa del Nightmares).

The final decades of the British Raj have been portrayed in dramas (The Jewel in the Crown and Indian Summers). Diplomats on a foreign posting have been the basis for drama (Embassy), documentary (The Embassy) and comedy (Ambassadors). British writers in Hollywood have been the subject of comedy (Episodes). Other settings include British doctors in contemporary India (The Good Karma Hospital) and a series of British detectives posted to an idyllic Caribbean island (Death in Paradise).

In 2024, the series Expats depicts the life of an American expatriate living in Hong Kong and confronted to a family tragedy.

== See also ==
- Alien (law)
- Asylum seeker
- Clientitis
- Cosmopolitanism
- Diaspora
- Diaspora politics
- Non-resident citizen voting
- Domicile (law)
- Economic migrant
- Emigration
- Émigré
- Ethnic enclave
- Existential migration
- Foreign born
- Foreign worker
- Global mobility
- Human capital flight
- International student
- Migrant worker
- Permanent residency
- Refugee
- Settler
- Statelessness
- Sex tourism
