= University of Tennessee at Chattanooga =

Public university in Chattanooga, Tennessee, US

The University of Tennessee at Chattanooga
- Former names: Chattanooga University (1886–1889); U.S. Grant Memorial University, Chattanooga campus (1889–1907); University of Chattanooga (1907–1969)
- Motto: Faciemus
- Motto in English: We shall achieve
- Type: Public research university
- Established: September 15, 1886; 140 years ago
- Parent institution: University of Tennessee System
- Accreditation: SACSCOC
- Academic affiliations: CUMU; ORAU; Space-grant
- Endowment: $234.5 million (2025)
- Chancellor: Lori Mann Bruce
- Administrative staff: 422
- Students: 12,060
- Undergraduates: 10,396 (fall 2025)
- Postgraduates: 1,664 (fall 2025)
- Location: Chattanooga, Tennessee, United States; 35.0458°N 85.2999°W
- Campus: Urban, Midsize city, 321 acres (1,300,000 m^{2})
- Colors: Navy and gold
- Nickname: Mocs
- Sporting affiliations: NCAA Division I – SoCon
- Mascot: Scrappy the Mocking Bird
- Website: www.utc.edu

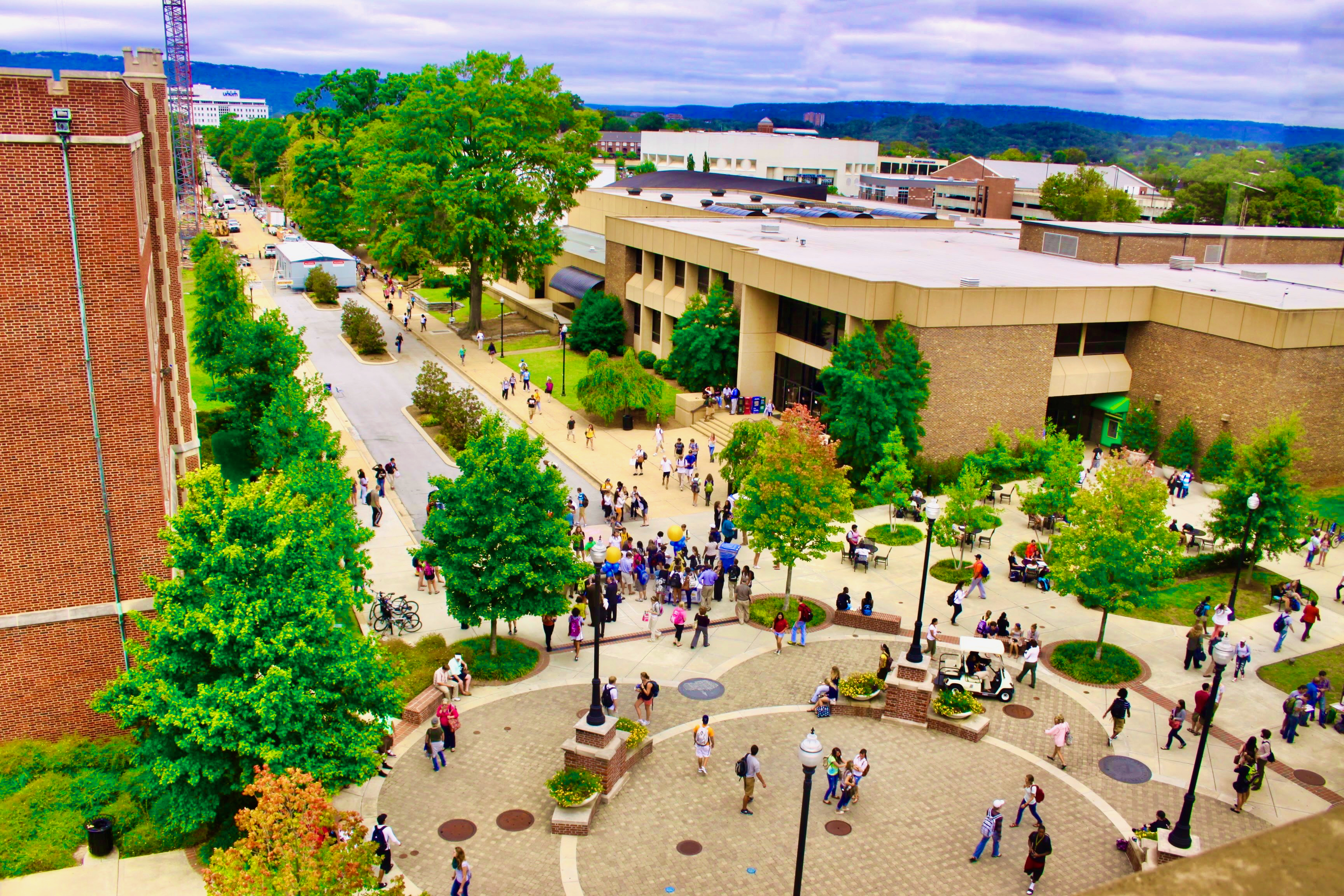
The University of Tennessee at Chattanooga

The University of Tennessee at Chattanooga (UT Chattanooga, UTC, or Chattanooga) is a public research university in Chattanooga, Tennessee, United States. It was founded in 1886 and is part of the University of Tennessee System.

The university is composed of five colleges, offering over 150 degree programs and concentrations, including 6 doctoral degree programs. As of fall 2025, UTC enrolled 12,060 students, including over 10,000 undergraduates and more than 1,600 graduate students.

== History ==
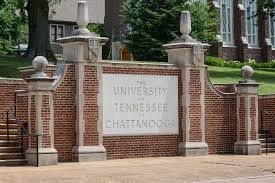

=== Founding and early years (1886–1907) ===
The university traces its origins to 1886, when it was established as the then-private and racially exclusive Chattanooga University. The institution opened on September 15, 1886, with a small faculty and student body, reflecting its early role as a private, church-affiliated college. In 1889, Chattanooga University merged with the Athens-based Grant Memorial University (now Tennessee Wesleyan University), forming the Chattanooga campus of U.S. Grant Memorial University. The reorganization led to administrative and academic challenges, including declining collegiate enrollment and institutional instability during the late nineteenth century. A period of restructuring began in the late 1890s under new leadership, which focused on strengthening academic standards and consolidating the institution into a liberal arts college. The institution then evolved into an independent institution and changed its name to University of Chattanooga in 1907.

=== Growth as a private university (1907–1969) ===
As the University of Chattanooga, the institution operated as a private university for more than six decades. During this period, it expanded its academic programs, faculty, and campus facilities, while maintaining strong ties to the Methodist Church and the local community. By 1945, the institution had established an alliance with Chattanooga's commercial and civic leaderships, sustaining the private undergraduate college well into the 1960s.

=== Transition to a public university (1969) ===
A major transformation occurred in 1969, when the University of Chattanooga merged with Zion College, which had been established in 1949 and later became Chattanooga City College, and joined the University of Tennessee System. The institution was subsequently renamed the University of Tennessee at Chattanooga. This transition marked a shift from a private, church-affiliated institution to a public university within a statewide system. As part of the UT system, UT Chattanooga was tasked with emphasizing undergraduate education while developing selected graduate and professional programs.

The University of Chattanooga Foundation Inc. is a private corporation, created in 1969, that manages the university's private endowment.

=== Modern era and institutional expansion (1970-present) ===
Since joining the UT system, UTC has expanded in enrollment, academic offerings, and campus infrastructure. The university developed multiple colleges and a broad portfolio of undergraduate, masters, and doctoral programs, reflecting its evolution into a comprehensive public university. In November 2025, UTC's nursing program transitioned to become a stand-alone nursing college.

== Administration ==
UTC uses the semester system, with five optional "mini-terms" in the summer. The leadership of the campus rests upon the chancellor, who answers to the UT System President. The university is currently headed by Chancellor Lori Mann Bruce.

=== Leadership ===
The following people have had the post of president or chancellor at the University of Tennessee at Chattanooga (UTC). Prior to 1969, the institution was known as the University of Chattanooga (1907–1969), U.S. Grant University (1889–1907), and Chattanooga University (1886–1889). At the time of UTC's establishment in 1969, the title of the leader became chancellor instead of president.

- Chattanooga University
  - Edward S. Lewis, president 1886-1889
- U.S. Grant University
  - John F. Spence, chancellor 1889–1891; president 1891–1893
  - Bishop Isaac W. Joyce, chancellor 1891–1896
- University of Chattanooga
  - John H. Race, president 1897–1914
  - Fred W. Hixson, president 1914–1920
  - Arlo A. Brown, president 1921–1929
  - Alexander Guerry, president 1929–1938
  - Archie M. Palmer, president 1938–1942
  - David A. Lockmiller, president 1942–1959
  - LeRoy A. Martin, president 1959–1966
- University of Tennessee at Chattanooga
  - William H. Masterson, president 1966–1969; chancellor 1970–1973
  - James E. Drinnon, chancellor 1973–1981
  - Frederick W. Obear, chancellor 1981–1997; acting chancellor 2004–2005.
  - Bill W. Stacy, chancellor 1997–2004
  - Roger G. Brown, chancellor 2005–2012
  - E. Grady Bogue, acting chancellor 2012–2013
  - Steve Angle, chancellor 2013–2025
  - Robert Dooley, acting chancellor 2025
  - Lori Mann Bruce, chancellor 2025–present

== Academics ==
Undergraduate demographics as of fall 2023
Race and ethnicity	Total
White	69%
Black	9%
Unknown	9%
Hispanic	6%
Two or more races	4%
Asian	3%
International student	1%
Economic diversity
Low-income (Note: The percentage of students who received an income-based federal Pell grant intended for low-income students.)	33%
Affluent (Note: The percentage of students who are a part of the American middle class at the bare minimum.)	67%

The university offers over 150 degree programs and concentrations in five colleges:

- College of Arts and Sciences
- College of Engineering and Computer Science
- College of Health, Education and Professional Studies
- College of Nursing
- Gary W. Rollins College of Business

Gary W. Rollins College of Business is accredited by the Association to Advance Collegiate Schools of Business (AACSB). UTC also has a Honors College and a Center for Professional Education.

The university offers over 140 undergraduate majors and concentrations, and over 50 undergraduate minors. Chattanooga also offers nearly 100 graduate programs and concentrations.

Academic rankings

National
- U.S. News & World Report: 315 (tie)
- Washington Monthly: 277

== Media and publications ==
Print

- University Echo – student newspaper
- Moccasin – student yearbook
- Education about Asia – educational magazine
- Sequoya Review – literary magazine
- Modern Psychological Studies – journal published by the Department of Psychology

Radio

- WUTC
- The Perch – student-run online radio station

== Research ==
SimCenter is UTC's computational engineering and simulation center. In November 2005, SimCenter was listed as the 89th most powerful supercomputer by Top500. On November 20, 2007, the university announced that the center had been named a National Center for Computational Engineering. More recently, the SimCenter provided the academic research for a new source of alternative energy unveiled by Bloom Energy Corporation in Sunnyvale, California.

The Clinical Infectious Disease Control Research Unit is a research interest group composed of UTC faculty, students, and local partners. Members of the CIDC have had their research published in peer-reviewed journals, as well as presented at professional meetings and conferences.

Journey Health Foundation Research Center is a research center established in September 2024. Partnered with the Journey Health Foundation, the research center is dedicated to doing research related to the social determinants of health and economic disparities across the greater Chattanooga area.

== Campus ==
The university is served by CARTA bus routes 4, 7, 10, 14, 19, and 28. Route 14 only operates on weekdays during fall and spring terms, when the university is session. The route runs on and off the campus on McCallie, Houston, Vine, Douglas, Fifth, and Palmetto Streets. A recent extension serves Third, O'Neal, and Central Streets, as well as Erlanger Hospital, and a large parking lot at Engel Stadium. All students showing valid university identification cards (MocsCards) ride for free on all CARTA routes, year-round.

=== Patten Chapel ===
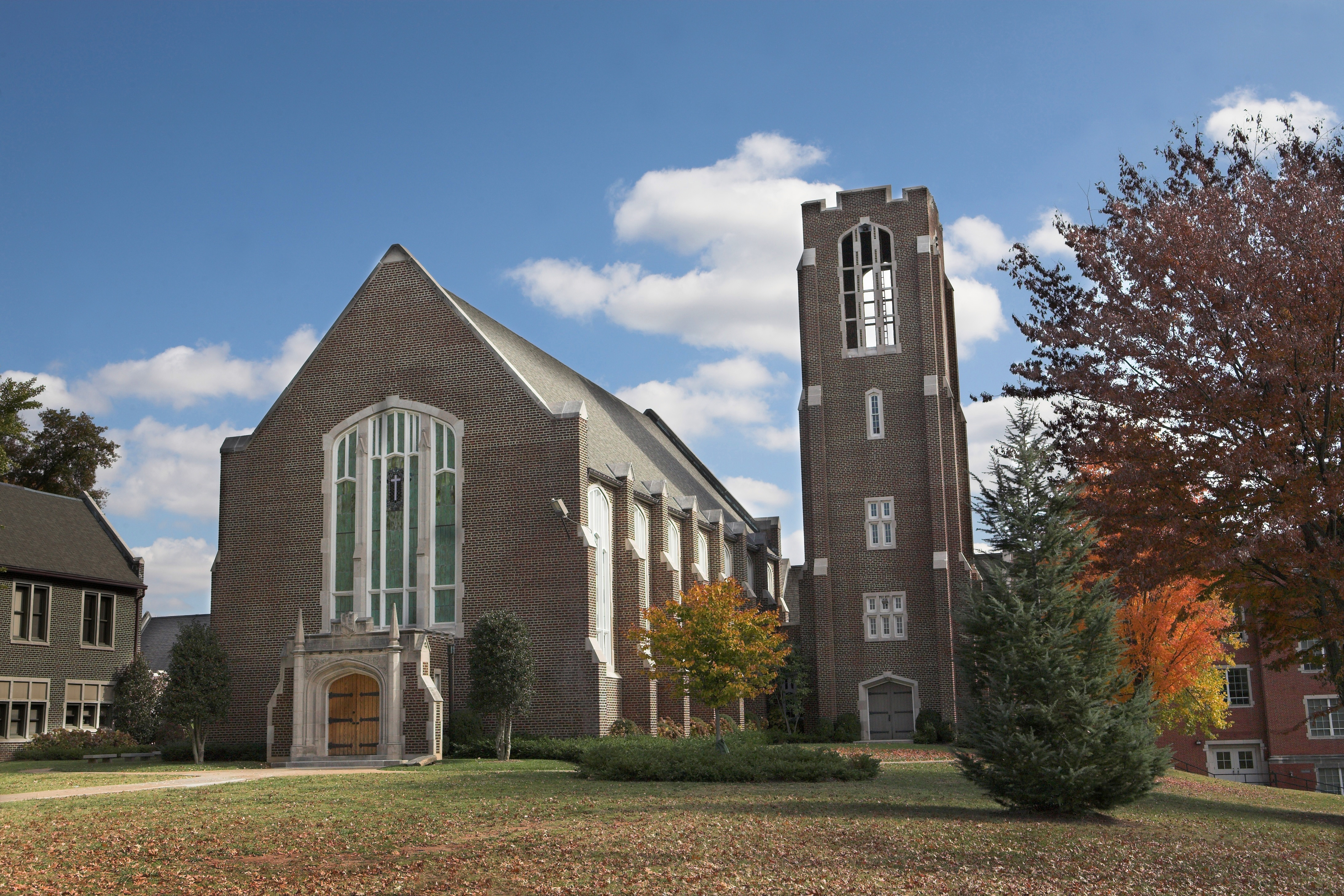
Patten Chapel

Patten Chapel is one of the busiest sanctuaries in Chattanooga. Mostly weddings and memorial services are held there. A bride's room has been prepared and is always ready. Reserving the chapel should be done around a year in advance as its popularity sees events almost every weekend. Wedding receptions are not hosted at the chapel.

=== Lupton Hall ===
Formerly the Lupton Memorial Library, Lupton Hall, named for T. Cartter and Margaret Rawlings Lupton, was constructed in 1974 to replace the aging John Storrs Fletcher Library (which has since been restored and renamed Fletcher Hall). As of 2005, the library's collection includes nearly 2 million items, including the Fellowship of Southern Writers archives. In 2008, the university was granted funding to build a new library.

The university broke ground in 2010 for the new $48 million 180,000-square-foot (17,000 m^{2}) library. Construction was completed on the UTC Library in January 2015.

Following the opening of the new UTC Library, Lupton Hall began renovations in 2018. Opening to students and faculty in 2020, Lupton's entire 116,000 square feet of available space had been gutted and rebuilt to include student centers, academic departments under the College of Arts and Sciences, various classroom spaces, and a new on-campus restaurant, Freshens.

== Athletics ==
Athletics logo

Chattanooga's colors are navy and old gold. Their men's teams and athletes are nicknamed Mocs, and women's teams and athletes are Lady Mocs. Chattanooga athletics teams compete in NCAA Division I (FCS for football) in the Southern Conference (SoCon) and have been ranked as a national top 100 athletic program by The National Association of Collegiate Directors of Athletics (NACDA) in the Division I Learfield Sports Director's Cup.

Basketball

Chattanooga's men's basketball program has been among the best in the Southern Conference since joining the league in 1977–78. The Mocs have won 10 SoCon Tournament titles, tied for first all-time with former member West Virginia and Davidson, 10 regular-season league championships prior to the change to the division format in 1995 and seven division titles, for 27 total titles. In 1997, led by coach Mack McCarthy and Chattanooga native Johnny Taylor, the Mocs made a run to the Sweet 16 as a No. 14 seed, beating Georgia and Illinois before falling to Providence. Before making the move to Division I, Chattanooga won the Division II National Championship in 1977. In July 2008, the team was ranked number 48 on the ESPN list of the most prestigious basketball programs since the 1984–85 season.

The Mocs won the SoCon tournament once again in 2009. Defeating the College of Charleston Cougars 80–69 in the championship game on their home court at the McKenzie Arena, the Mocs punched their ticket to the NCAA tournament, their first since 2005.

Jimmy Fallon from Late Night with Jimmy Fallon chose the Mocs as his team of choice going into the 2009 NCAA tournament. The Wednesday night (March 18) show included a live Skype chat with Head Coach John Shulman, as well as representatives of the pep band and cheerleading squads made in studio. Fallon's house band The Roots wrote and performed an ode to Shulman titled, "The Don Juan of the SoCon" and Shulman and his six seniors (Nicchaeus Doaks, Zach Ferrell, Kevin Goffney, Khalil Hartwell, Stephen McDowell and Keyron Sheard) made an in-studio appearance following their tournament game with UConn.

The Lady Mocs are the most successful women's basketball program in Southern Conference history, with 15 regular season titles since 1983–1984, 10 consecutive conference championships at the end of 2008–2009, and 14 overall conference championships.

Golf

The men's golf squad won its third consecutive Southern Conference trophy and finished 18th in the NCAA Championships in 2009.

In August 2012, UTC golfer Steven Fox won the U.S. Amateur Championship.

Women's golf posted a 3.46 team GOA in the spring while advancing to the NCAA Division I finals in just the second year of the program since disbanding in the mid-1980s.

Softball

The Mocs’ softball team has won 11 regular season titles and 10 SoCon Tournament Championships. They have also made 7 NCAA tournament appearances.

Wrestling

Chattanooga is home to the only NCAA Division I wrestling program in the state of Tennessee. The Mocs' wrestling team has won 8 of the past 9 SoCon titles since the 2012–2013 academic year.

Football

The team plays in the Southern Conference (SoCon) in Division I FCS (formerly I-AA). Hall of Famer Terrell Owens played wide receiver for the Mocs from 1992 to 1995. The team won three straight SoCon championships from 2013 to 2015. They play in Finley Stadium, which hosted the NCAA Division I Football Championship from 1997 to 2009.

In 2021, the team fired its offensive line coach, Chris Malone, for making a derogatory social media post about Georgia and civil rights leader Stacey Abrams.

=== Athletic venues ===
- Chamberlain Field (1908–1997)
- Finley Stadium (1997–present)
- Maclellan Gymnasium and natatorium (gym opened 1961; natatorium opened 1968)
- McKenzie Arena (1982–present), aka the Roundhouse, due to its circular shape and the city's association with the railroad industry

== University nickname ==
The school's athletic teams are called the Mocs. The teams were nicknamed the Moccasins until 1996. (The origin of the name is uncertain; however, Moccasin Bend is a large horseshoe-shaped bend in the Tennessee River directly below Lookout Mountain.)

The mascot has taken on four distinct forms. A water moccasin was the mascot in the 1920s, and then a moccasin shoe (known as "The Shoe") was used as the school's mascot at times in the 1960s and 1970s. From the 1970s until 1996, the mascot was Chief Moccanooga, an exaggerated Cherokee tribesman.

In 1996, the Moccasins name and image were dropped in favor of the shortened "Mocs" and an anthropomorphized northern mockingbird, in accordance with the state bird, named "Scrappy" dressed as a railroad engineer. The school's main athletic logo features Scrappy riding a train (a reference to Chattanooga's history as a major railroad hub and to the song "Chattanooga Choo Choo"). The mascot takes its name from former football coach A. C. "Scrappy" Moore.

== Fight song ==
The fight song for UTC is "Fight Chattanooga".

== Band ==
The marching band is referred to as the "Marching Mocs" and performs at all home games.

== Notable alumni, students, and faculty ==
- Hugh Beaumont, actor (most notably portrayed Ward Cleaver on Leave It to Beaver), 1927
- Burwell Baxter Bell, U.S. Army general, 1968
- William Chivous Bostic Sr., physician and researcher, 1905
- Eldra Buckley, NFL football player, 2007
- Anthony Burger, pianist, 1966
- Bill Butler, former NFL player, 1958
- North Callahan, author and historian whose papers and book collection now reside in the UTC Lupton Library, 1930
- A.R. Casavant, marching band director, inventor and innovator credited with creating the precision drill
- B.J. Coleman, former NFL player for the Green Bay Packers in 2012; signed with the Saskatchewan Roughriders of the CFL in 2016
- Antuan Edwards, NFL football player
- Steven Fox, golfer, 2012 U.S. Amateur champion
- Gibby Gilbert, PGA Tour professional golfer, 1963
- Willie Earl Gillespie, USFL and NFL football player
- Irvine W. Grote, chemist, inventor of the active ingredient in Rolaids and Bufferin, UC 1918; chemistry faculty, 1942–1969
- Stanley A. Harris, Boy Scouts of America executive
- Dennis Haskins, actor (most notably portrayed Mr. Belding on Saved by the Bell), 1972
- Maud Callaway Hays, clubwoman and genealogist
- Tony Hill, NFL and CFL football player, 1990
- Brent Johnson, NFL football player, 1986
- Leslie Jordan, Emmy-winning actor, 1982
- Mindaugas Katelynas, basketball player, 2005
- Mathew Knowles, music executive, transferred to Fisk University
- David F. Levine, pioneer in canine rehabilitation and physical therapy, author, physical therapy professor, 1990–present
- Chris Lewis-Harris, NFL football player (Cincinnati Bengals), 2011
- Charlie Long, basketball player, football player (NFL/AFL ALL-Pro)
- Lanni Marchant, long-distance runner, 2007
- Khaled Mattawa, poet and writer, 1989
- Tre McLean (born 1993), basketball player in the Israeli Basketball Premier League, 2017
- Mark Mendenhall (born 1956), J. Burton Frierson professor of Excellence in Business Leadership
- Barry Moser, artist and professor, 1962
- Terrell Owens, Hall of Fame NFL football player, basketball player; selected in the third round of the 1996 NFL draft by the San Francisco 49ers
- Cherie Priest, author, 2001
- Lorine Livingston Pruette, psychologist, 1918
- Curtis Rouse, former NFL football player, 1982
- Buster Skrine, NFL football player (Cleveland Browns, New York Jets), 2011
- Lewis Smith, actor North and South. Also the Heavenly Kid, 1979
- Cole Strange, football player for New England Patriots, 2022
- Johnny Taylor, former NBA basketball player, 1997; drafted in the first round, 17th pick
- Bo Watson, member of Tennessee State Senate, 1983
- Pez Whatley, football player and UTC's first black wrestler, later became a pro wrestler
- William White, academic of journalism and bibliographer, 1933
- Willie White, former NBA basketball player, 1984
- Gerald Wilkins, former NBA basketball player, 1984
- Julius C. Zeller, Mississippi senator, 1893
