= Julius C. Zeller =

American politician

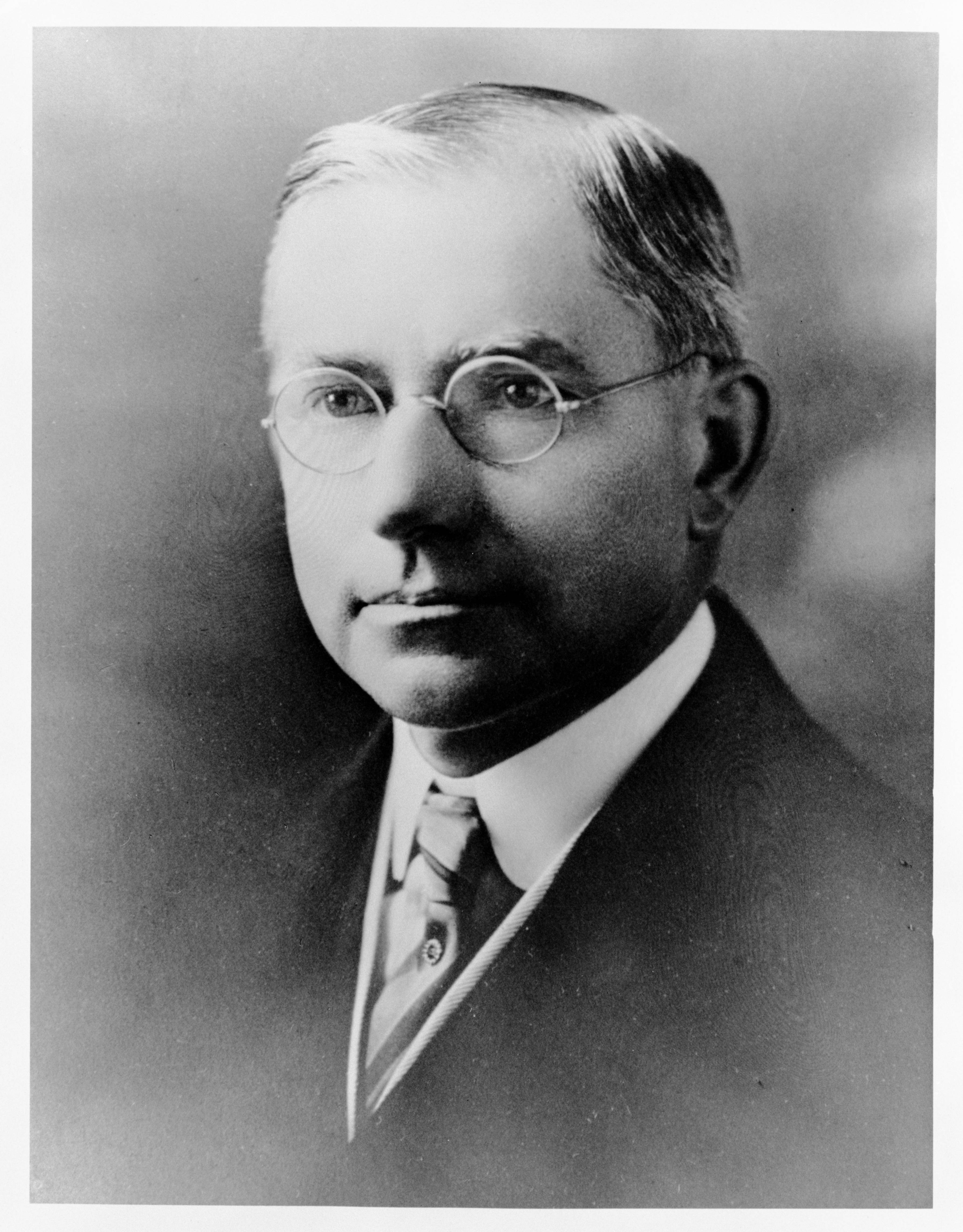
Portrait of Julius C. Zeller, circa 1909

Julius Christian Zeller (1871–1938) was an American clergyman of the Methodist church, an educator, and a politician who served in the Mississippi Senate representing Yazoo County.

== Early life ==
Julius Zeller was born in Spring Bay, Illinois in 1871, the son of Dr. John G. Zeller, a well-known physician in central Illinois, and Caroline Winkler Zeller. Zeller's father came to America from Bavaria, Germany about 1851. Zeller had one brother, Dr. George A. Zeller, who became known for his work as the superintendent of the Peoria State Hospital.

== Education and career ==
Zeller attended the Academy of Northwestern University at Evanston, where he graduated in 1889, in 1893, Zeller graduated with his Bachelor of Oratory and Bachelor of Arts from Grant University. After completing his bachelor's degree, Zeller was active in ministerial work for the Methodist Episcopal Church.

Zeller received his Bachelor of Divinity from Grant University in 1904. In 1905, Grant University awarded Zeller the M.A. degree for the graduate work Zeller completed at the University of Chicago

Zeller worked in higher education throughout his career. From 1905 until Zeller was elected president of the University of Puget Sound, he acted as the chair of Philosophy and Education at Illinois Wesleyan University From 1909 to 1913, Zeller served as the president of the University of Puget Sound

Zeller later moved to Mississippi, where he served as the superintendent of Bolivar County agricultural schools from 1920 to 1921, as the director of the Summer Normal School in Benton, Mississippi during 1922, and was a member of the State Commissioner on Institutions for Higher Learning during 1926. From 1930 to 1932, Zeller was the dean of men and vice-chancellor of the University of Mississippi, where he was also a professor of philosophy and psychology.

== Political Work ==
As an educator, Zeller served on the Special Committee on the Matter and Methods of Sex Education, which presented their report before the subsection on sex hygiene of the fifteenth international congress on hygiene and demography, which was held in Washington D.C. in September 1912. The Committee reported on proposed propositions related to "normal sex-processes". The propositions were intended to determine the instruction of sex in schools, which were meant to educate students about "the danger of unnatural an unhygienic sex-habits, licentious or irregular sexual indulgence, the dangers of social diseases." Zeller maintained that all schools, from elementary through high school, should have school physicians, as they can do much of the work of advising students about sexual hygiene. Zeller also reported that "sex hygiene" should be taught to separate classes, by teachers of the same sex as their students. Most educators on the committee agreed with Zeller at the time, though a few proposed joint classes where both male and female students would be present

During his time in Mississippi in the early 1920s, Zeller served as a Senator for Yazoo County. In 1919, Zeller recommended the establishment of a single consolidated state university in Jackson, Mississippi in order to improve the state university system, but the legislature would not pursue his recommendation until eight years later, when it was again proposed by Senator Linton Glover North.

== Personal life ==
Julius Christian Zeller married Alice Bryant in January 1895, and the couple had 9 children together, 7 of which survived into adulthood
