= Cavaletti =

Short fence used in horse jump training

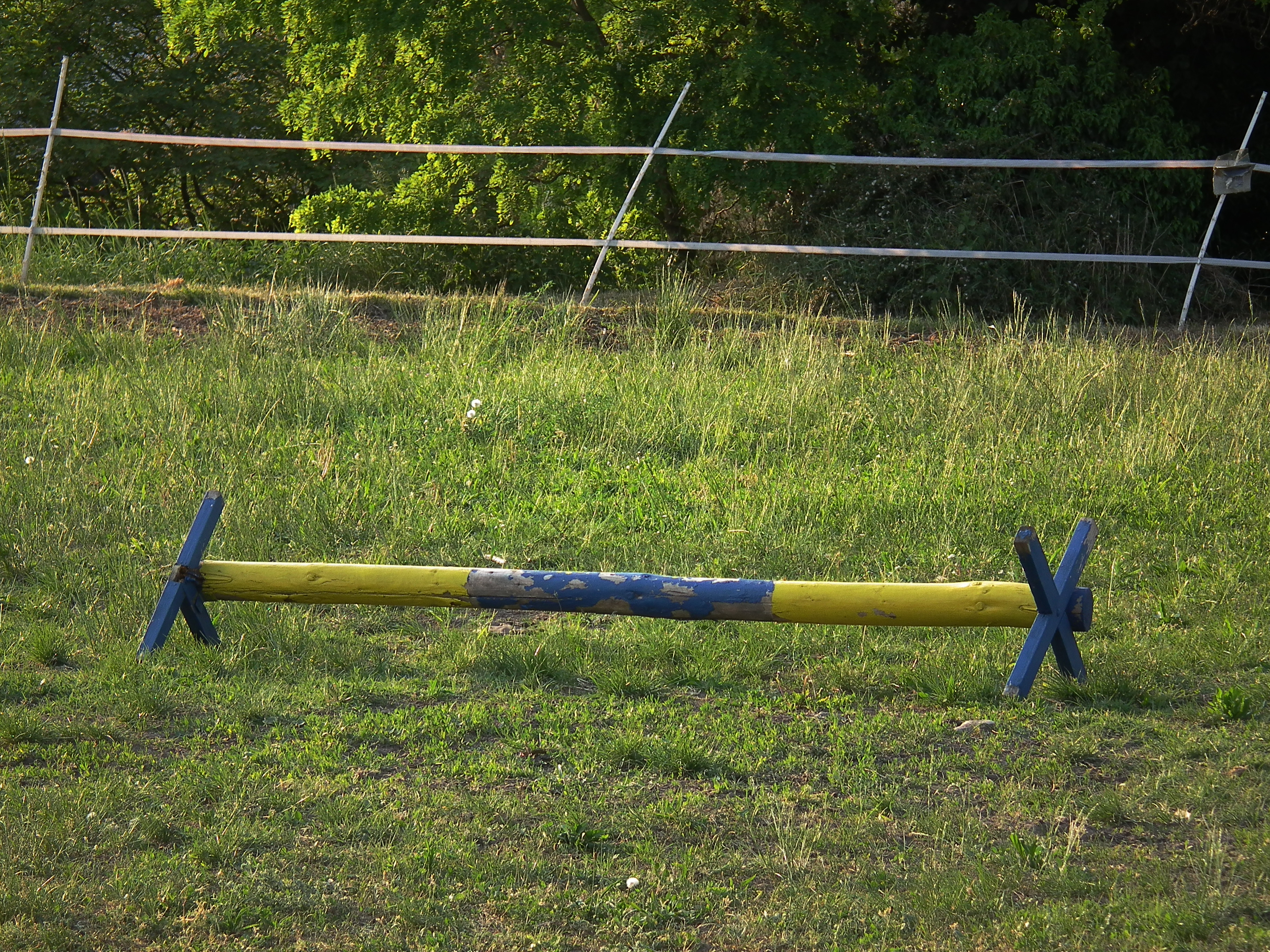
A single cavaletti or cavaletto, set to its intermediate height

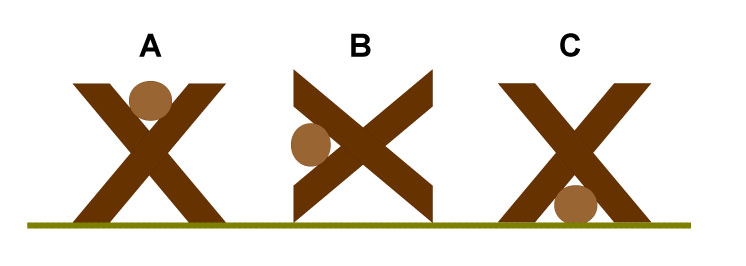
Cavaletti – 3 possible height settings

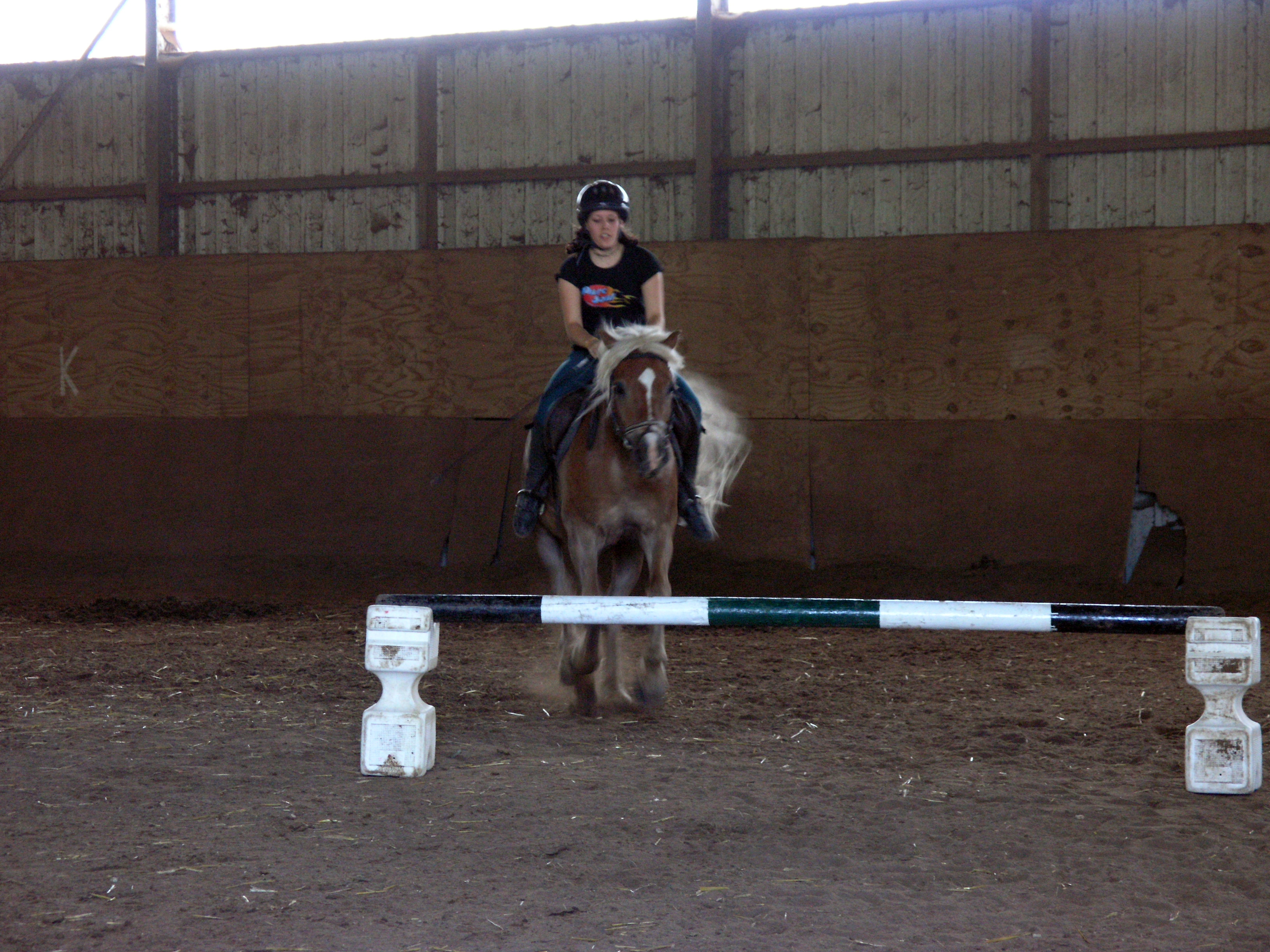
Modern molded plastic cavaletti standards, placed at highest setting and used as a jump

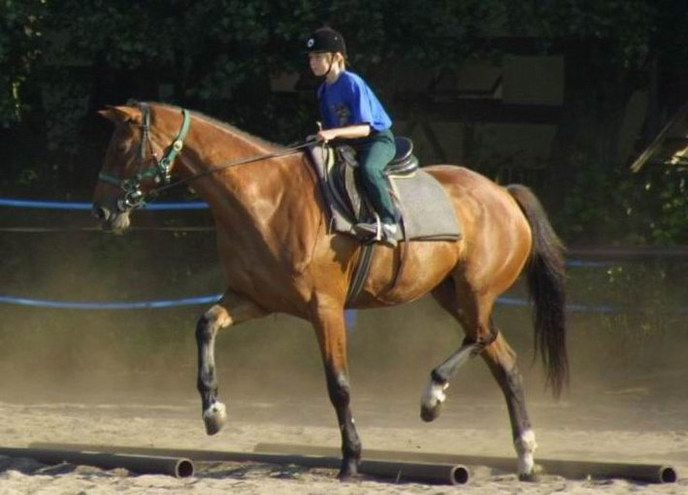
Simple ground rails used as cavaletti

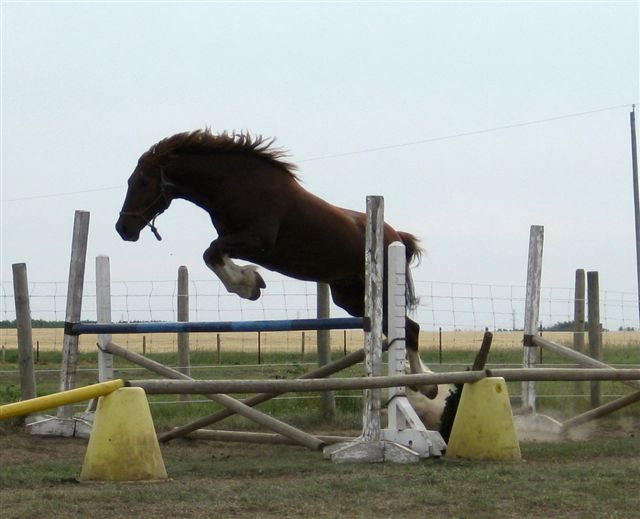
Cones used as cavaletti standards to define a corridor for a free jumping horse

Cavaletti (also spelled cavalletti, singular (rarely used in English) cavaletto) (Italian: "little horse") are small jumps, originally made of wood, used for basic horse training. Most consist of rails that are about 4 inches (10 cm) wide, and 10 feet (3.0 m) long. The rails are inserted into fixed standards, usually made in an "X" shape, that are commonly designed to be placed at one of three preset heights ranging from a few inches off the ground to a maximum of about 18 to 24 inches (46 to 61 cm). However, in informal terminology, even ground rails without standards are sometimes called "cavaletti". Modern designs can be made from various types of molded plastic and PVC pipe as well as wood. They can be used both for ground training with the handler working a horse on a longe line or at liberty, or while a rider is mounted on the horse. Cavaletti are used by practitioners of both English riding and western riding. Similar obstacles of lighter weight materials are used with dogs in dog agility and canine physical therapy.

Cavaletti were invented by Federico Caprilli and designed to help a horse improve its balance, adjust its length of stride, and to loosen and strengthen its muscles. They are often used in sets of at least four to six placed in a row, but can be configured in nearly unlimited ways. Used at their lowest placement as ground rails or at a level no more than about 12 inches (30 cm) high, they can be set to encourage a proper length of stride. By being set closer or further apart than a horse's natural stride, they encourage lengthening or shortening of the stride. Used as a "gymnastic" in conjunction with other horse jumping obstacles in a training ring, they help teach the horse how to approach a fence at the proper speed and length of stride. Set at higher settings, they become small jumps to introduce young horses or beginning riders to jumping. Some designs can safely be stacked, allowing fences up to about 2.5 feet (0.76 m).

Spaced as ground rails between 3 and 3.5 feet (0.91 and 1.07 m) apart, cavaletti encourage a horse to maintain a shorter stride at a trot or jog. Spaced further apart, a row of cavaletti encourage a longer, more extended trot stride. Beginning at approximately 6 to 7 feet (1.8 to 2.1 m) apart, they encourage a slow canter or lope and spaced at intervals of 9 to 12 feet (2.7 to 3.7 m), depending on the size and stride of the individual horse, they help regulate a horse's proper pace as it approaches or departs from a jumping obstacle.

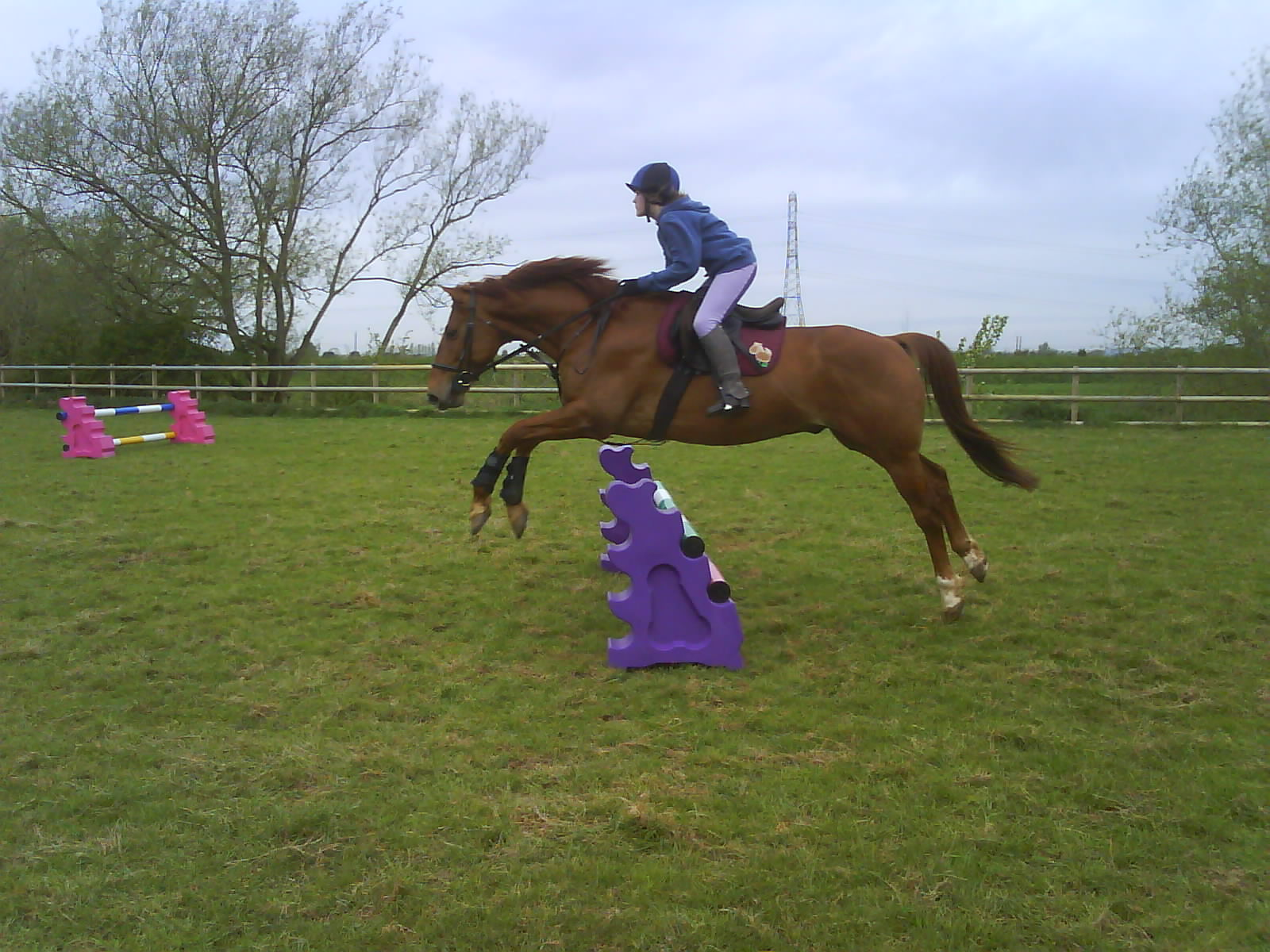
A modern molded plastic standard for cavaletti or small jumps with multiple preset heights

In modern use, cavaletti are used not only for training, but also in some types of horse show competition such as trail horse classes for western riders, and very basic beginning jumper classes. They are not only used as jumps or ground rails, but can also be used to define corridors for training exercises or in trail horse or driving classes.

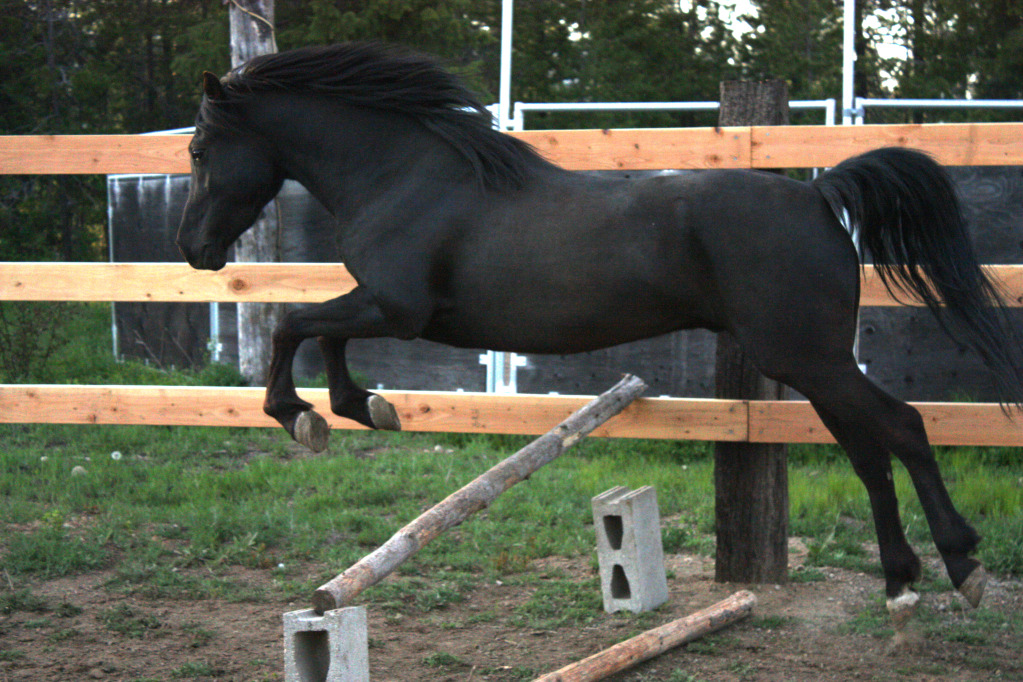
Makeshift cavaletti of concrete blocks and a fence rail may present safety issues

There are potential safety issues associated with cavaletti. The standards need to be designed to be a compromise that will be stable if lightly struck by a horse's leg or hoof, yet move or give way if tripped over or hit with force. Standards need to be designed so that a horse cannot catch a leg in the "X" standard if they attempt to evade or run out on the cavaletti. Cavaletti not designed to be stacked could fall in a dangerous manner if stacked and then knocked down. Edges of standards should be squared or rounded in a manner to avoid presenting sharp edges if struck by a horse or a falling rider.
