= David F. Levine =

American professor of physical therapy, and a biomedical scientist (born 1965)

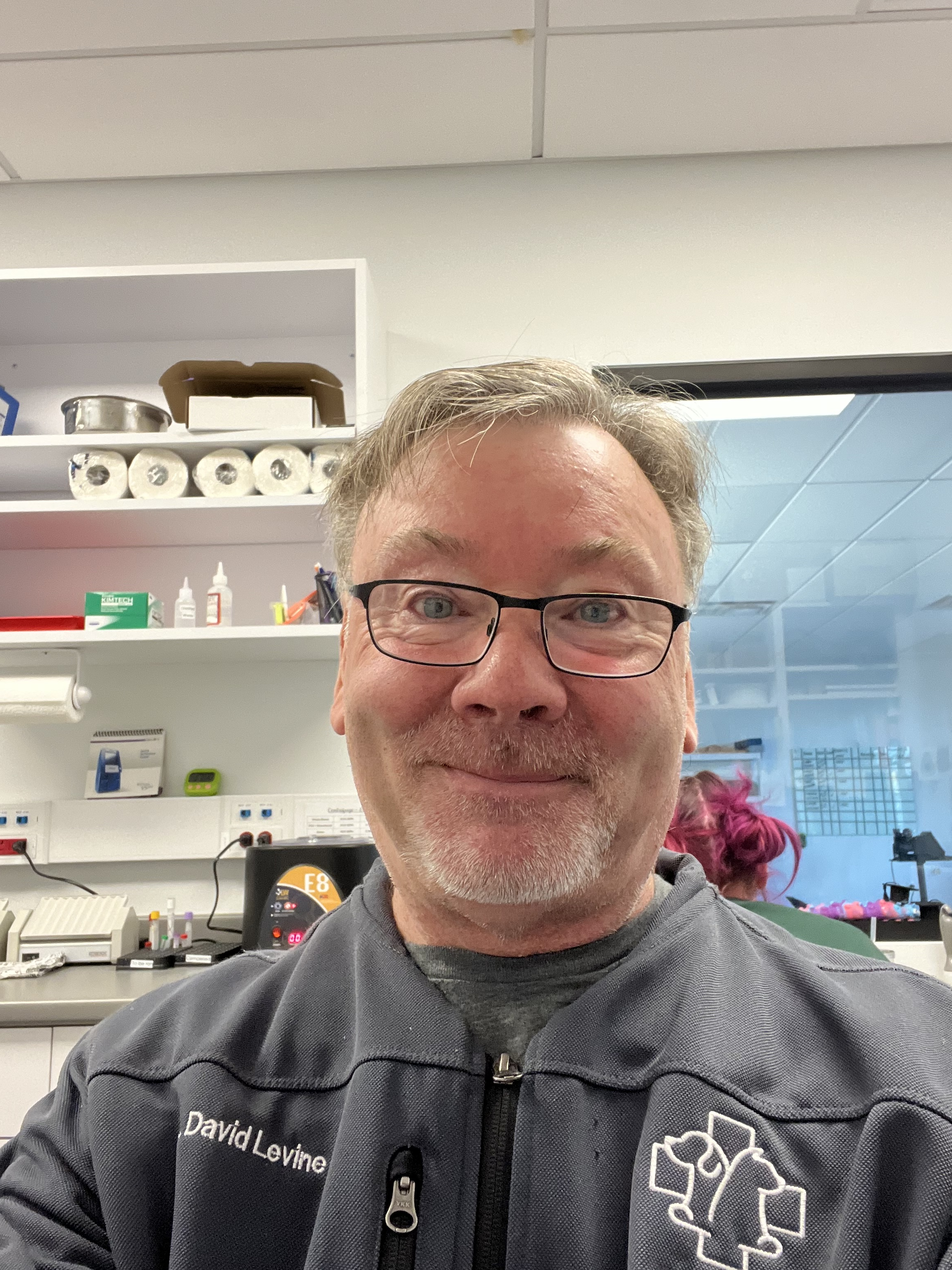
- Born: July 13, 1965 (age 61)
- Education: University of New England, Boston University, University of Tennessee Knoxville, University of Tennessee Chattanooga
- Scientific career
- Fields: Physical therapy, Animal-assisted therapy, Canine rehabilitation and physical therapy, Clinical infectious diseases research, Ehlers-Danlos Syndrome research

David F. Levine (born July 13, 1965) is an American author, a professor of physical therapy, and a biomedical scientist. He holds the Walter M. Cline Chair of Excellence in Physical Therapy at the University of Tennessee at Chattanooga. His research and publication contributions focus on veterinary rehabilitation and physical therapy, including canine physical therapy, animal assisted therapy, gait analysis and motion analysis, the use of modalities such as extracorporeal shockwave therapy, electrical stimulation, low-level laser, and therapeutic ultrasound, as well as clinical infectious disease research and Ehlers-Danlos Syndrome research.

== Education ==
- B.S. Physical Therapy, The University of New England
- M.S. Orthopedic Physical Therapy, Boston University
- Ph.D. Exercise Science, The University of Tennessee
- DPT Doctor of Physical Therapy, The University of Tennessee at Chattanooga
- MPH Master of Public Health, The University of Tennessee at Chattanooga

== Academic and research areas of interest ==
=== Ehlers-Danlos Syndrome Patient Management ===
Levine works with a team of faculty, students, and local partners to investigate different treatments for individuals with Ehlers–Danlos syndrome. Most recently Levine and colleagues conducted research on occupational interventions for clients with Ehlers–Danlos syndrome in the presence of postural orthostatic tachycardia syndrome. In another area of research, they studied sleep characteristics common in clients with Elhers-Danlos Syndrome, and the association between sleep, pain, and mental and physical health. Additionally, they researched the effects of using KT tape on clients with Ehlers-Danlos syndrome shoulders.

=== Infectious disease prevention ===
As a member of University of Tennessee at Chattanooga's Research Interest Group on Clinical Infectious Disease Control, Levine works with a team of faculty, students, and local partners to investigate the efficacy of disease control in various local clinical settings and potentially decrease the spread of hospital-acquired infection (HAI). Most recently, Levine has contributed, along with members of his team, to research on contamination in pediatric intensive care units. Levine spoke on these subjects at the Association for Professionals in Infection Control and Epidemiology 2019 Annual Conference in June 2019 and their 2022 Annual Conference in June 2022.

=== Canine rehabilitation ===
Levine plays a part in the development of canine rehabilitation and physical therapy, and he is a certified canine rehabilitation practitioner in Tennessee. He has held adjunct positions at the Colleges of Veterinary Medicine at the University of Tennessee and NC State since 2001 and 2003, respectively. He currently co-chairs the University of Tennessee's Certificate Program in Canine Rehabilitation, one of only two such programs available in the United States. It offers certification for physical therapists, veterinarians, veterinary technicians, and physical therapy assistants. There is no accreditation available for this growing field, but both programs are "included in the Registry of Approved Continuing Education, which is the industry standard for veterinary continuing education."

Levine has been featured in various television stories, including special talks on the DogTV television channel regarding how animals can benefit human health, and also a news story on WDEF-TV channel 12 in Chattanooga about animal assisted therapy. An article done by the University of Tennessee at Chattanooga's magazine features a story on how Levine became involved in animal physical therapy and how far it has come today. The magazine did another article in 2024 that discusses Levine's work in canine rehabilitation research.

=== University of Tennessee at Chattanooga ===
In 1990, Levine accepted a position at the University of Tennessee at Chattanooga as a professor in the physical therapy department, a position he still holds. He is actively involved in the enhancement and betterment of the university.

=== TEDx ===
In recent years, Levine has become involved with the TEDx programs. Levine is the co-chair of TEDxChattanooga and was involved in the organization of their first TEDx event. The conference was titled "Now What?" and took place on October 25, 2014, on the university's campus.

Levine was also involved in their February 2016 event.

In September 2017, he co-organized a third TEDx event in Chattanooga at Baylor School with TEDxBaylorSchool.

=== American Physical Therapy Association ===
Levine is a member in the American Physical Therapy Association. He has written home study courses for their orthopedic section, including Biomechanics of Gait: Hip and Biomechanics of Gait: Knee—and was the subject matter expert for Basic Science for Animal Physical Therapists.

As of 2015, he was vice chair of the Evidence Based Practice Special Interest Group, which is housed under the American Physical Therapy Association section on research and has created curriculum guidelines for physical therapy schools around the nation.

In 2018, he was a Catherine Worthingham Fellow of the American Physical Therapy Association. This is the association's highest membership category, awarded to members who have "demonstrated unwavering efforts to advance the physical therapy profession for more than 15 years, prior to the time of nomination."

=== World Physiotherapy ===
As a board member of the International Society for Electrophysical Agents in Physiotherapy (ISEAP), Levine has spoken numerous times at World Physiotherapy events.

=== American College of Veterinary Sports Medicine and Rehabilitation ===
On March 27, 2026, Levine was elected as an Honorary Diplomate by the American College of Veterinary Sports Medicine and Rehabilitation (ACVSMR). He was recognized for his numerous contributions to the development and progress within the field. He is only the fourth person to have been named an honorary Diplomate by the ACVSMR and the first non-veterinarian.

=== Other research and scholarly works ===
Levine is on the editorial board for PeerJ, a biological and medical science journal, Frontiers in Veterinary Science, and Animals (journal), a scientific journal that includes all areas of animal biology. He is also an associate member of the allied health research unit at the University of Central Lancashire.

He was a keynote speaker at the 2015 Connect Physiotherapy Conference, hosted by the Australian Physiotherapy Association.

== Publications ==
=== Books ===
- Canine Rehabilitation and Physical Therapy, 1e
- Canine Rehabilitation and Physical Therapy, 2e
- Essential Facts of Physiotherapy in Dogs & Cats - Rehabilitation and Pain Management
- Veterinary Rehabilitation and Therapy, An Issue of Veterinary Clinics: Small Animal Practice (Nov. 2005)
- Gait Analysis: An Introduction, 4e
- Whittle's Gait Analysis, 5e
- Whittle's Gait Analysis, 6e
- Rehabilitation and Physical Therapy, An Issue of Veterinary Clinics of North America: Small Animal Practice, 1e (The Clinics: Veterinary Medicine) (Jan. 2015)
- Better You Better Dog Better Life
- Essential Facts of Physical Medicine, Rehabilitation and Sports Medicine in Companion Animals
- Forensic Gait Analysis: Principles and Practice
- Gait analysis of the good boys: Golden Retrievers en vivo

=== Online publications ===
- Infection Prevention Is Key in a Neonatal Intensive Care Unit
- Inpatient and Outpatient Clinics Must Monitor Fomites as Part of IPC Protocols
- Hiding in Plain Sight: How You Can Fight Bacterial Contamination in Your Clinic
- Coronavirus: A Wake-up Call for Best Practices in Preventing Pathogen Transmission

=== Peer-reviewed journal articles and other research contributions ===
Levine has been author or co-author on over 300 research articles in a variety of peer reviewed journals, including The American Journal of Veterinary Research, Veterinary Clinics of North America: Small Animal Practice, Gait and Posture, Medical Engineering and Physics, The Journal of Athletic Training, and The Journal of Orthopaedic and Sports Physical Therapy with over 225 articles indexed in PubMed. Dr. Levine is an associate editor of the veterinary surgery and anesthesiology section of the Frontiers in Veterinary Science journal. Dr. Levine is also a founding member of the Clinical Infectious Disease Control Research Unit at the University of Tennessee Chattanooga and is a part of current and ongoing infectious disease research in the clinical setting.
