= Sebastian Reiche =

German researcher (born 1977)

B. Sebastian Reiche
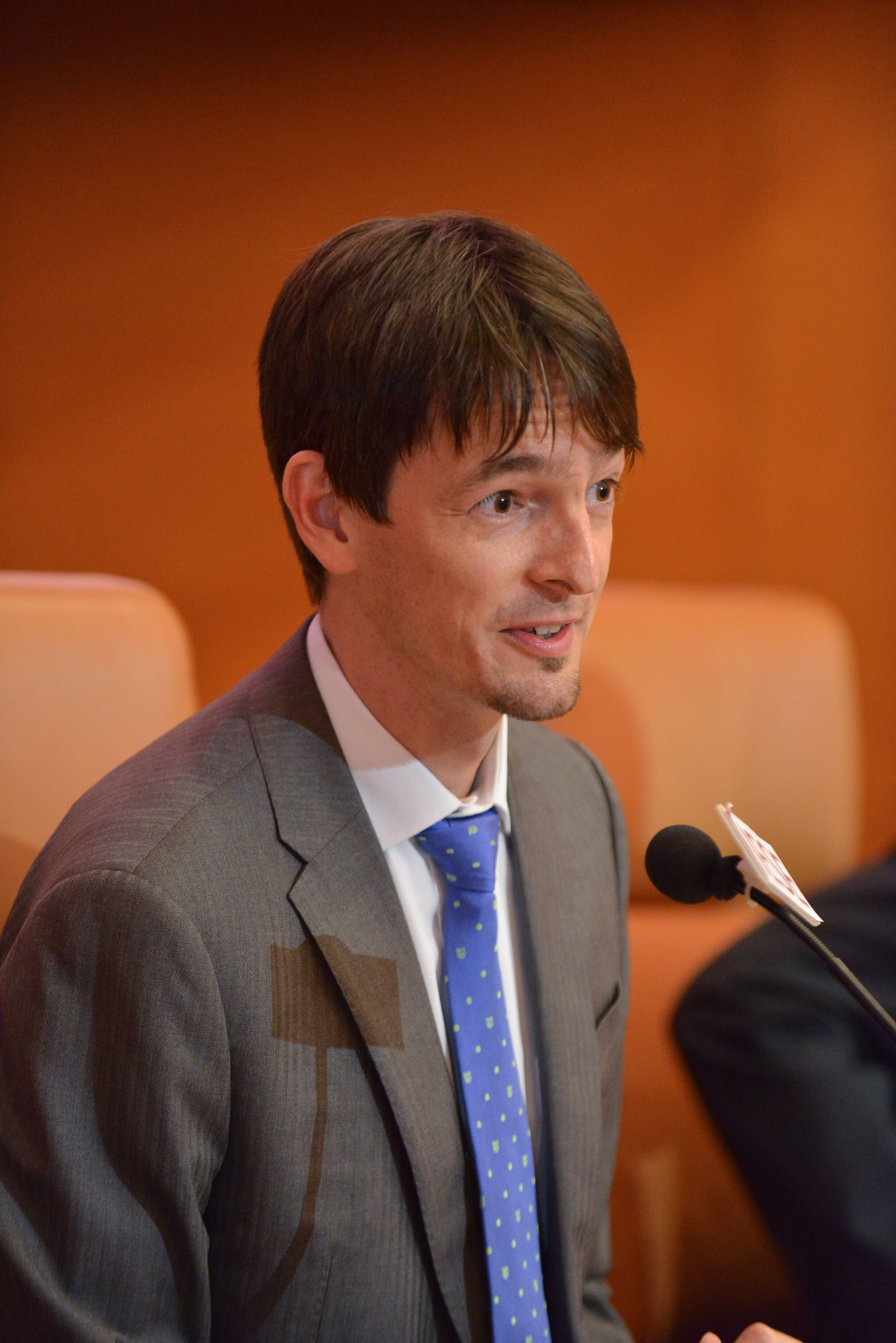
- Born: 1977 (age 48–49); Hanover, Germany
- Occupations: Professor and researcher

Academic background
- Education: University of Melbourne (PhD), University of Hannover (BA / MEBA)

Academic work
- Institutions: IESE Business School
- Main interests: Global work environment

B. Sebastian Reiche (Hanover, 1977) is a German management educator, professor and researcher. An expert in the global work environment, he is a professor at IESE Business School since 2007. He has numerous academic publications to his name and is an editor and member of several scientific journal editorial boards. Throughout his career, he has received various awards, including the International HRM Scholarly Research Award from the Academy of Management for two consecutive years.

== Academic and professional career ==
Reiche has a PhD from the University of Melbourne, Australia. Previously, he was B.A./Master in Economics and Business Administration by the University of Hannover. Since 2007 he is professor of Managing People in Organizations at IESE Business School.

His research focuses on the global work environment, talent mobility, work design, global leadership, and the role of culture and language in international business. He has published many articles in peer-reviewed scientific journals and chapters in edited books. His research work has been published, among others, in Academy of Management Discoveries; Academy of Management Journal; Journal of International Business Studies; Journal of Management Studies; Organizational Behavior and Human Decision Processes; and Organization Science.

He is an associate editor of Human resource management, and co-editor of Advances in Global Leadership. He is also a member of the editorial board of other scientific outlets, such as the Academy of Management Discoveries, Journal of Management, Journal of International Business Studies, and Personnel Psychology. He is also member of IESE Insight Business School Magazine's editorial board.

His research work has received several awards: by the Academy of Management (Scholarly Research Award in International Human Resource Management in 2012 and 2013), the Journal of International Business Studies Silver Medal, the Human Resource Management Journal 2023 Best Article Award, and the Research Excellence Award from IESE Business School (2022).

He contributes to leading newspapers in several countries: The Financial Times, Wall Street Journal, The Economist, BBC, IMD, La Vanguardia, and El País. He regularly writes a blog called ‘Expatriatus’.

== Main publications ==
=== Books ===
- Reiche, B.S. (2026). Proximity. How to balance belonging and difference in today’s workplace. Bloomsbury, USA: Bloomsbury Publishing.
- Reiche, B.S., Harzing, A.-W., & Tenzer, H. (2026). International Human Resource Management (7th edition). London: Sage.
- Reiche, B.S., Stahl, G.K., Mendenhall, M.E., & Oddou, G. (2024). Readings and Cases in International Human Resource Management (7th edition). New York: Routledge.

=== Research articles ===
- Guzman, F.A., & Reiche, B.S. (2024). A chorus of different tongues: Official corporate language fluency and informal influence in multinational teams. Organizational Behavior and Human Decision Processes, 182: 104334.
- Neeley, T.B., & Reiche, B.S. (2022). How global leaders gain power through downward deference and reduction of social distance. Academy of Management Journal, 65(1): 11–34.
- Reiche, B.S., Harzing, A.-W., & Kraimer, M.L. (2009). The role of international assignees’ social capital in creating intellectual capital: A cross-level model. Journal of International Business Studies, 40(3): 509–526.

=== Book chapters ===
- Reiche, B.S., & Lazarova, M.B. (2024). Repatriation. In C. Asmussen, N. Hashai & D. Minbaeva (Eds.), Elgar Encyclopedia of International Strategic Management, pp. 361–363. Cheltenham: Edward Elgar.
- Lazarova, M.B., Reiche, B.S., & Clegg, C. (2024). Shifts in research on global mobility. In: M. Gelfand & M. Erez (Eds.), The Oxford Handbook of Cross-Cultural Organizational Behavior, pp. 583–608. Oxford: Oxford University Press.
- Ghemawat, P., & Reiche, B.S. (2017). Cultural distance and national cultural differences. In P. Ghemawat (Ed.), The Laws of Globalization and Business Applications, pp. 239–279. Cambridge: Cambridge University Press.
