= Canine physical therapy =

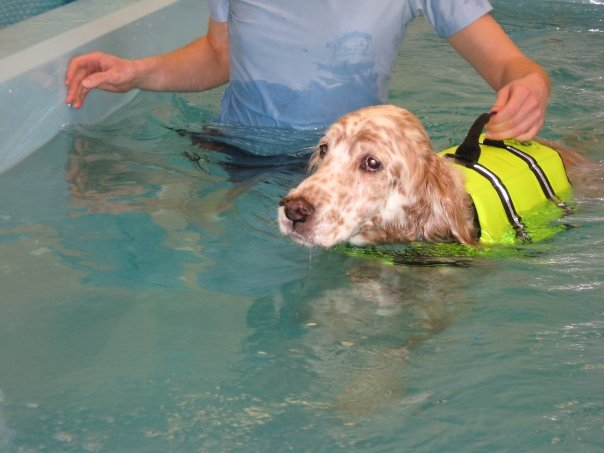
- Hydrotherapy is one of the many physical therapy techniques used at animal physical therapy practices. Above, a veterinary technician assists a dog to swim.
- Other names: Canine rehabilitation

Physical therapy for canines adapts human physical therapy techniques to increase function and mobility of joints and muscles in animals. Animal rehabilitation can reduce pain and enhance recovery from injury, surgery, degenerative diseases, age-related diseases, and obesity.

The goal of physical therapy for animals is to improve quality of life and decrease pain. Although most veterinary practices offering physical therapy are geared toward canines, techniques used in this discipline can also be applied to horses, cats, birds, rabbits, rodents and other small animals.

== History ==
The benefits of physical therapy for animals have been widely accepted in the veterinary community for many years. Canine physical therapy emerged in the 1980s and 1990s, stemming from research presented in journal articles published by groups like the American Physical Therapy Association, American Veterinary Association, and American Colleges of Veterinary Surgeons. However, clinical practice of physical therapy for animals is a relatively new field in the U.S. In Europe, equine and canine physical therapy have been widely recommended and used for at least the last fifteen years. In the last three to five years, the veterinary community in the U.S. has seen a large growth in physical therapy practices for animals, making it a more available resource for practicing veterinarians. This growth in the availability of canine physical therapy is forcing a change in focus in many veterinary practices from curative and palliative care to preventive care. An example of this is the push for the use of animal physical therapy for weight reduction in obese animals. Weight reduction can reduce the risk of developing many degenerative diseases such as osteoarthritis and DJD.

== Education ==
Veterinary Sports Medicine and Rehabilitation is an AVMA boarded specialty through the American College of Veterinary Sports Medicine and Rehabilitation. Diplomates (Specialists)of this college advance the art and science of veterinary medicine by promoting expertise in the structural, physiological, medical and surgical needs of athletic animals and the restoration of normal form and function after injury or illness. These specialists have special training and educational requirements above and beyond a veterinary degree and are identified as Diplomates of the American College of Veterinary Sports Medicine and Rehabilitation ( DACVSMR).

Canine rehabilitation is also practiced by general veterinarians and physical therapists with specialized training. If your pet is being treated by a physical therapist, in some states, the pet must have a diagnosis, veterinary medical clearance (VMC), and, sometimes, referral by a veterinarian to start a physical therapy regimen. The certified canine rehabilitation practitioner (CCRP) is one designation for veterinarians, veterinary technicians, physical therapists, or physical therapist assistants who perform physical rehabilitation and is offered through Northeast Seminars with affiliation with the University of Tennessee outreach program. A certified canine rehabilitation therapist (CCRT) certification is available through the Canine Rehabilitation Institute in Florida and Colorado—affiliated with Colorado State University. Other more extensive and individualized training and online offerings are available as well.

== Benefits ==
There are many benefits to canine physical therapy. For example, it speeds up the recovery period following surgery, helps with mobility and flexibility, allows for stronger endurance and agility, reduces pain, and also helps to prevent future injuries, allowing for a healthier and longer life. A prime example of this involves a dachshund named Hartley; the dog suffered a severe spinal cord injury, and her owners never thought she would be able to walk again. It was discovered shortly thereafter that the dachshund had intervertebral hereditary disc disease. However, with the help of animal physical therapy, where trainers used acupuncture and underwater treadmill therapy, within a few weeks Hartley was getting back to her normal self. Similarly, an older cockapoo named Biscuit enrolled in physical therapy due to chronic arthritis; the owners had previously considered putting the dog down. During therapy, the dog ran an obstacle course, which aided in its physical health and happiness. These are but two examples that show the benefits of canine physical therapy.

== Techniques ==
In an animal physical therapy practice, a CCRT or CCRP usually confers with the diagnosing veterinarian on the cause and severity of an animal's condition to develop a specialized therapy plan on a client by client basis. Each technique used in animal physical therapy has different benefits and not all techniques are useful for each condition. Physical therapy for orthopedic conditions can include any combination of the following techniques: thermotherapy, cryotherapy, hydrotherapy, muscle building exercises electrical stimulation and coordination exercises. Neurological conditions generally benefit the most from balance and coordination building exercises, muscle building exercises, electrical stimulation and hydrotherapy. Surgical repairs and traumatic injuries are generally treated with heat therapy, cryotherapy, massage, electrical stimulation, and hydrotherapy.

Therapeutic ultrasound is often used to diagnose potential injuries, so that a therapy plan can be developed. The process is done by placing ultrasound gel on top of the dog’s skin and moving the probe around to see the affected area. This specific technique is used because it allows for a less invasive treatment, and for treating soft tissue injuries, muscle strains, ligament sprains, and arthritis. Therapeutic ultrasound promotes benefits of tissue relaxation, reducing inflammation, and giving better blood flow to affected areas of injury.

=== Massage ===
Massage is used in animal physical therapy to relieve tension in muscles and stimulate muscle development. Massage helps speed up recovery from injuries and surgery by increasing blood flow to the area and relieving muscle spasms. Massage is used widely in canine physical therapy and can be helpful in improving the comfort of animals affected by nearly all medical conditions. Massage is one of the main technics to treat myofascial pain

=== Thermo and cryotherapy ===
Thermotherapy is generally used in animal physical therapy before strength building exercises and hydrotherapy. Heat packs are applied to the affected area to increase range of motion, decrease stiffness in joints and increase blood flow. This helps to make the animal more comfortable in the application of other physical therapy techniques. Deep heating of the muscle by laser therapy is often used to stimulate healing of surface wounds and relieve pain and discomfort of constricted and sore muscles. Cryotherapy is often used after an intensive physical therapy session to decrease discomfort caused by inflammation of the muscle.

=== Passive range of motion ===
Passive range of motion (PROM) is accomplished through flexion and extension of the joint to its limits. It is important for the physical therapist not to stretch the joint past its normal limits. PROM is used to encourage animals to use the full range of motion of the joints. This therapy technique can significantly increase an animal's range of motion and decrease joint pain, improving its quality of life.

=== Balance Exercises ===
Balance exercises make use of equipment designed to strengthen weak muscles and build up limbs affected by atrophy. These exercises include balancing on physio-balls, wobble boards and balance boards. Balance exercises can be useful in animals recovering from surgery. The animal is forced to place weight on the surgical repair, building muscle in the affected area. These exercises can also be helpful for animals with neurological conditions. For example, an animal recovering from a stroke has decreased coordination and balance which can be improved through a physical therapy regime that includes balance exercises.

=== Coordination exercises ===
Coordination exercises help improve an animal's awareness of its surroundings. Such exercises include cavalettis, weaves, and figure eights. Cavaletti is an exercise that gives an animal obstacles to walk over. This exercise makes the animal focus on where each foot is being placed and builds coordination. Weaves and figure eights help to build coordination and strength by forcing the animal to shift its weight quickly from one side to the other as it turns.

=== Hydrotherapy ===
Hydrotherapy techniques use water as a tool to improve muscle and joint function in animals. These techniques include but are not limited to swimming and underwater treadmill. Swimming allows an animal to work several muscles at once while stretching further than walking on land would allow. This helps to build muscle and endurance and is a technique that minimizes stress on the joints. Underwater treadmill is used commonly in animal physical therapy. It provides the benefits of land exercises while decreasing the weight placed on the animal's limbs. Underwater treadmill and swimming can be very useful in dogs recovering from surgery, such as anterior cruciate ligament and cranial cruciate ligament repairs and break repairs.

=== Electrical Stimulation ===
Electrical stimulation techniques uses electrical currents to either stimulate muscles or to combat pain. Neuromuscular electrical stimulation (NMES) is often used to help improve muscle strength, and/or motor recruitment. Trans-cutaneous electrical nerve stimulation (TENS) can be used to help relieve the pain that the animal may be experiencing. These techniques are used along with the other techniques listed above.

== See also ==
- David F. Levine- canine rehabilitation practitioner

Myofascial Pain in Dogs
