= Mark Mendenhall =

Mark E. Mendenhall (born 1956) is a university professor who holds the J. Burton Frierson Chair of Excellence in Business Leadership in the Gary W. Rollins College of Business at the University of Tennessee, Chattanooga. Mendenhall's research covers global leadership, international human resource management and expatriate adjustment. With his co-authors he published theoretical work on expatriate adjustment and training in the 1980s and 1990s. Since the early 2000s, his research has focused mainly on global leadership.

Mendenhall has co-authored and edited 29 books, some of which include: Global Leadership: Research, Practice and Development, 3rd edition (Routledge); Responsible Global Leadership: Dilemmas, Paradoxes, and Opportunities (Routledge), Managing Culture and Human Resources in Mergers and Acquisitions (Stanford University Press); Developing People Through International Assignments (Addison-Wesley); The Blackwell Handbook of Global Management: A Guide to Managing Complexity (Wiley-Blackwell); and Global Assignments: Successfully Expatriating and Repatriating International Managers (Jossey-Bass).

He has published 122 journal articles and scholarly book chapters in a variety of publications, including Academy of Management Review, Journal of International Business Studies, Sloan Management Review, Academy of Management Learning & Education, Human Relations, Organizational Dynamics, Human Resource Management, Management International Review, and Journal of Management Inquiry.

In 1998, Mendenhall held the Ludwig Erhard Stiftungsprofessur endowed chair at the University of Bayreuth (Germany). From 1999 to 2004 he was a visiting professor at the Europa Institute at the University of Saarland (Germany). In 2013, he was a visiting professor at the Vienna University of Economics and Business (Austria), and from 2009 to 2015 he was a visiting professor at Reykjavik University (Iceland). He is a partner in The Kozai Group, a consultancy that works on global leadership assessment and development.
