= Jumping (horse) =

Action in many equestrian sports

A horse and rider jumping an obstacle

Jumping plays a major role in many equestrian sports, such as show jumping, fox hunting, steeplechasing, and eventing. The biomechanics of jumping, the influence of the rider, and the heritability of jumping prowess have all been the focus of research.

== Jumping process ==
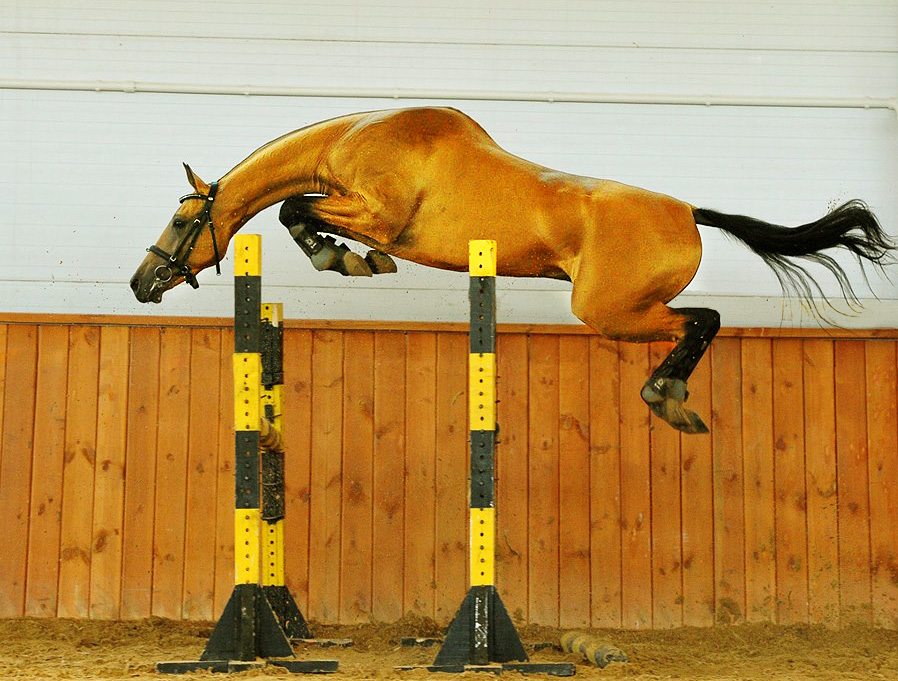
A horse free jumping

The airborne phase of the jumping process occurs between stance phases of the fore and hind limbs and is therefore biomechanically equivalent to a highly suspended or elevated canter stride. For this reason, horses typically approach obstacles at the canter. The jumping process can be broken down into five phases:

=== Approach ===
The "approach" is the final canter stride before the jump, during which the horse places all four legs for the optimal take-off. The horse reaches forward and down with his neck to lower the forehand and his center of mass. The forelegs are propped or strutted out in front of the body. This relatively sudden braking action allows momentum to carry the hindlegs further under the body of the horse than would be otherwise possible. While the action is more fluid, it is mechanically similar to the act of crouching down before jumping. They also use their back legs to lift them off.

=== Take-off ===
The "take-off" begins when the forelegs leave the ground and is completed when the hindlegs leave the ground. Once the horse leaves the ground, he is unable to influence the trajectory that his center of mass follows through the air, which makes take-off the most critical phase of the jumping process. Most of the energy required to clear an obstacle is produced by the hind legs. The longer the hindlegs are in contact with the ground, the greater their capacity for producing power; the further forward the hindlegs are placed under the body, closer to the obstacle, the longer this stance phase. Power is produced by the compression of the hindleg, which flexes at the hip, stifle, hock, and fetlock, and then releases energy like a spring.

=== Flight, suspension, or airborne phase ===
During "flight", the horse's center of mass follows a parabolic trajectory over which it has no control. The horse can change the position of its legs and body in relation to the center of mass, however, which is critical to clearing an obstacle safely. The horse's body rotates through the air, a quality called "bascule", to ensure that while the forehand clears the fence, the shoulders are the highest point of the body, and while the hind end clears the fence, the hips are the highest point of the body. The bascule is the horse's arc over the fence. A horse with a good bascule makes a rounded jump and helps the horse jump higher. The forelegs are drawn up towards the body and the hindlegs are "retroflexed" out away from the body to clear the obstacle. During flight, the rider has little impact on the actual trajectory of the horse's body. Foals frequently change leads when jumping.

=== Landing ===
The horse lands first with the trailing (non-leading) foreleg, and then with the lead foreleg. The hind limbs follow suit. The landing places a great deal of strain on the forelegs, which can lead to injuries or lameness over time.

=== Recovery, getaway ===
During the first stride after the jump, the horse re-balances itself. Horses sometimes react to discomfort or high emotion during the recovery, and may buck, bolt, or toss their heads.

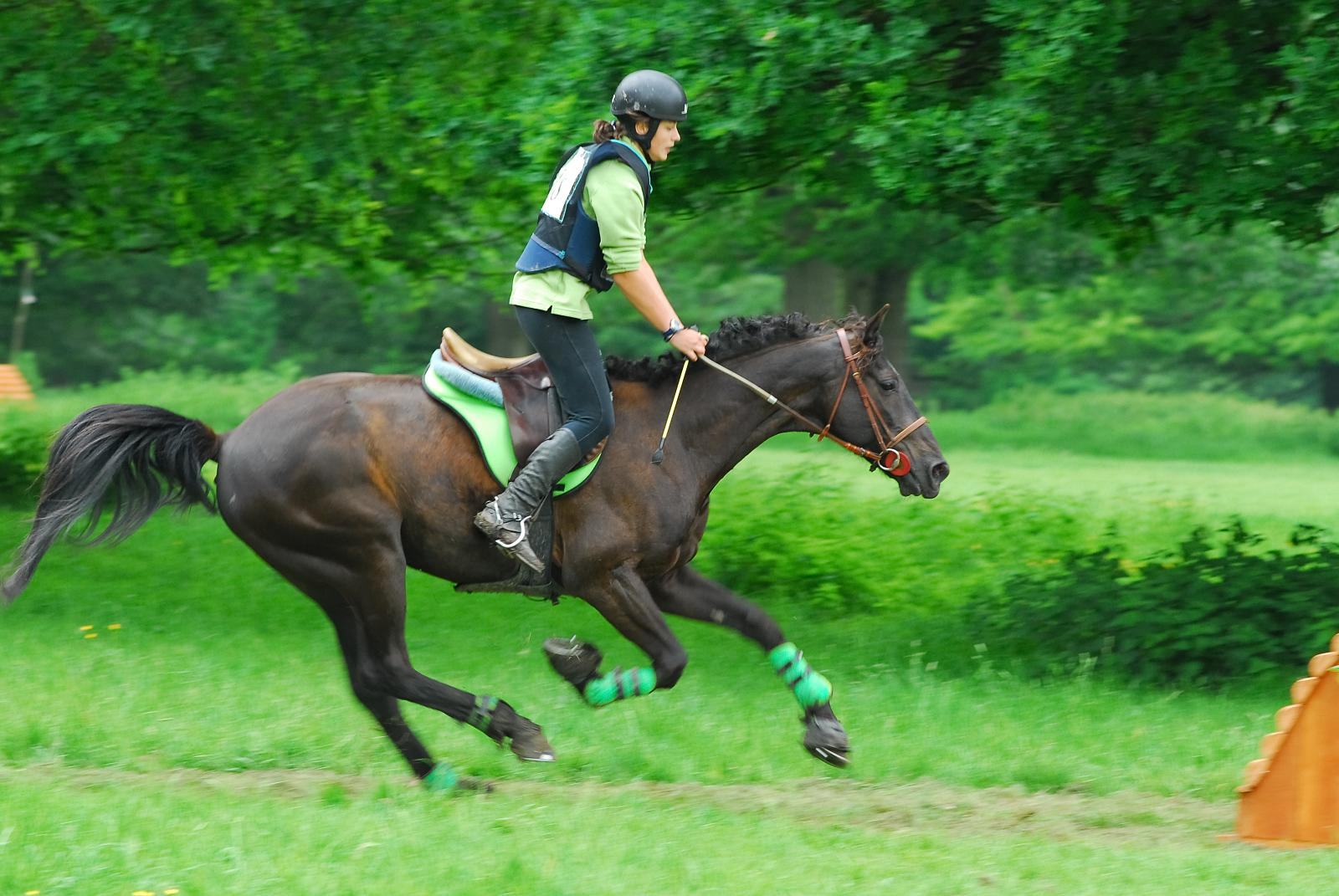
Approach.

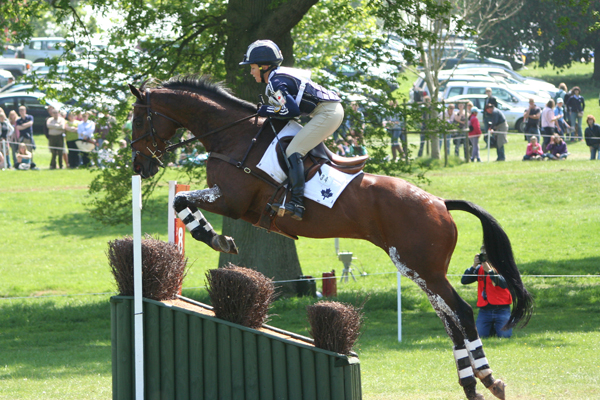
Bascule during flight.

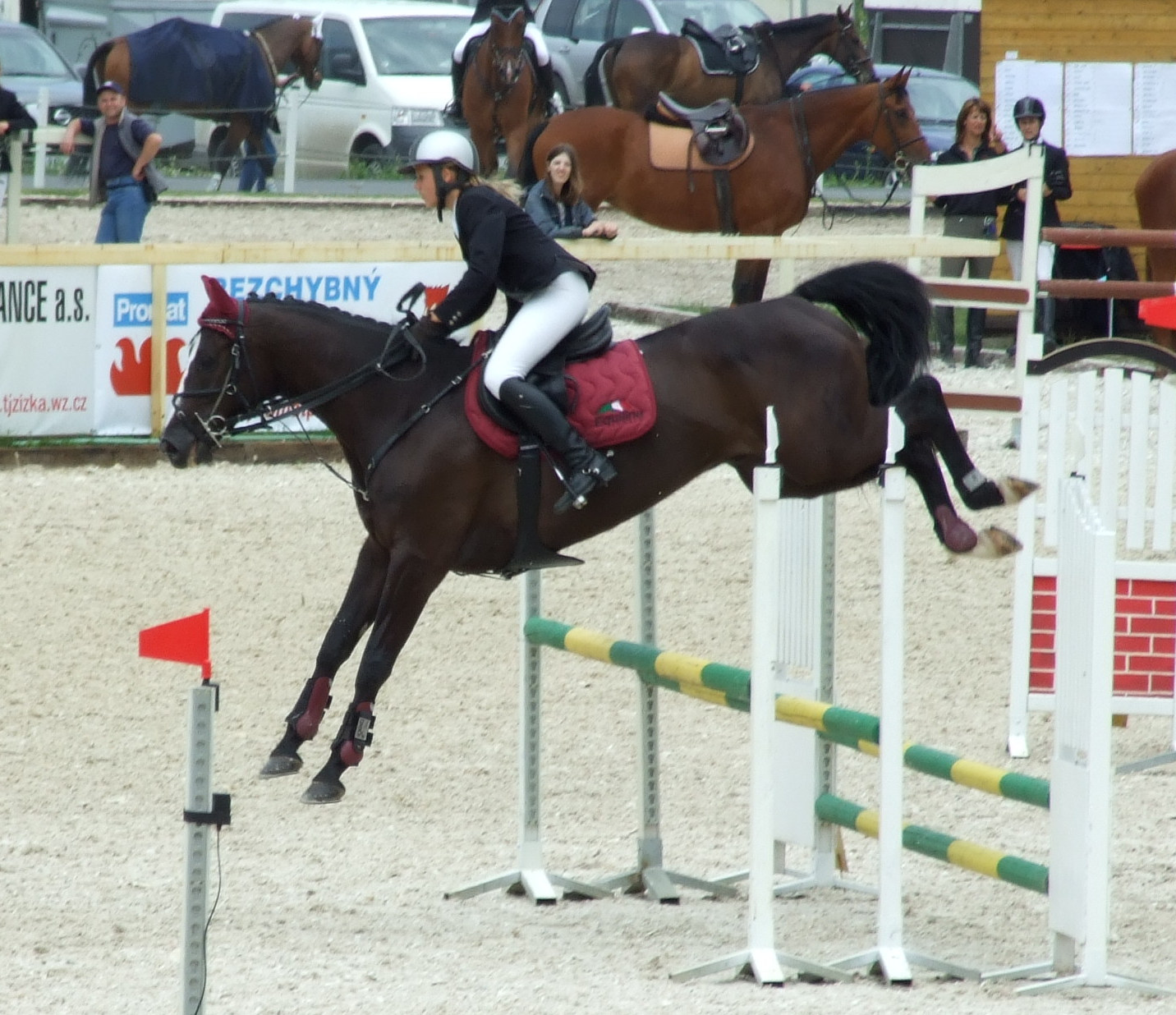
Retroflexing of the hind legs during flight.

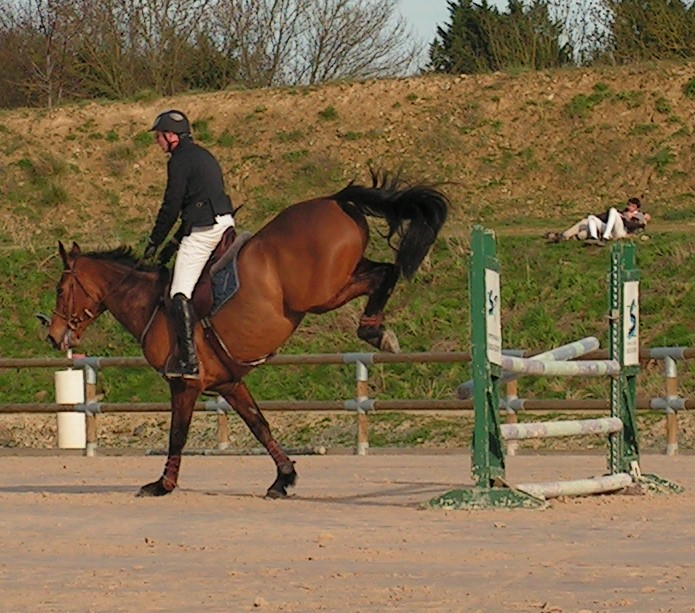
Landing

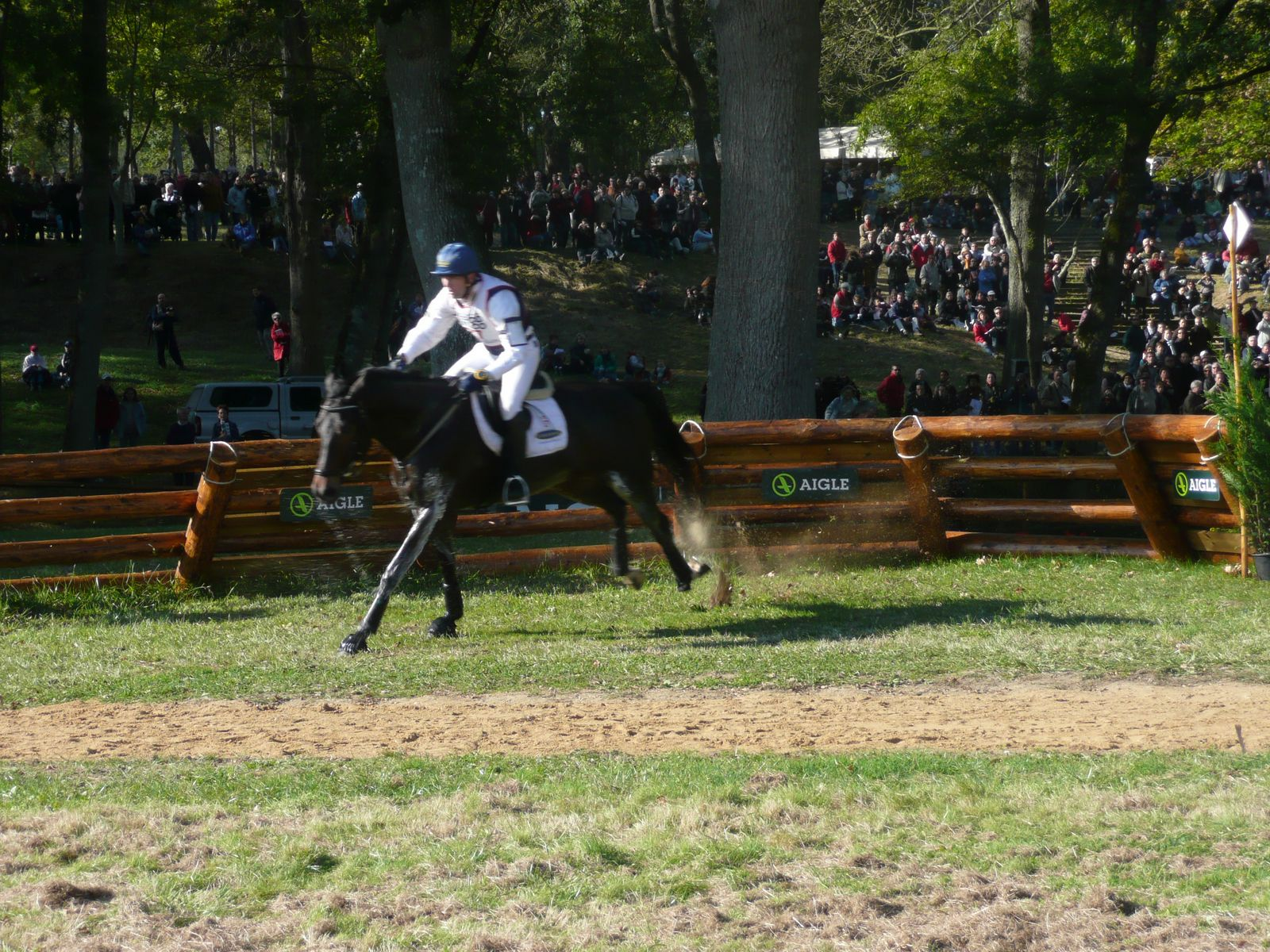
Recovery

== Injuries associated with jumping ==
Classic animation by Eadweard Muybridge of a horse and rider jumping

Jumping is a very strenuous activity that places high physical demands on the horse. The primary stresses affect the suspensory apparatuses of the hind legs during take-off and the forelegs during landing, though the galloping and turning associated with jumping also place torque on the joints. Most injuries, chronic or acute, begin with strain; as structures in the horse's body absorb the shock of take-off and landing, they acquire small amounts of damage. Over time, this damage leads to inflammation of the tendons (tendinitis) and ligaments (desmitis). The most common injuries in the forelimb occur to the interosseous ligaments and the superficial digital flexor tendons and less commonly, the accessory ligament of the deep digital flexor tendon. Strain on the superficial digital flexors is greater when jumping higher fences, so horses may no longer be suitable for competitive jumping after damaging that apparatus.

The effects of jumping on the hind legs can include injuries to the proximal, medial, or lateral branches of the suspensory ligaments. Jumping horses can also be at a higher risk of developing osteochondritis dissecans (OCD) or other arthritic conditions, even at a young age. Genetic and environmental components play roles in the development of OCD in horses: some families have weaker joints, but excessive growth over a short period of time, age-inappropriate exercise regimens and nutrition can also contribute. Jumping performance is especially influenced by the presence of arthropathic hocks. One study found that at breeding stock evaluations, horses with radiographically diagnosed athropathies of the hock joints scored significantly lower than their healthy peers for the quality of the canter, jumping technique, and ability and their character. The pain associated with arthropathic conditions likely makes the horses unwilling to push powerfully off their hindlegs, a quality necessary for jumping and cantering and which could make the horse appear lazy or unwilling to work.

Indications of lameness in jumping horses typically come in the form of a change in habits: sudden or developing reluctance to turn, land on a certain lead, or "add" a stride and jump "deep"; difficulties altering the stride length or making the distances in a combination; and developing habits like rushing, stopping and refusing, or frequent lead changes. Unfortunately, many of these undesirable habits can also be the result of poor training, which challenges riders and owners to identify the causes of bad behavior.

== World records ==
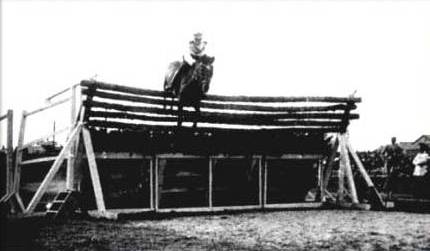
The world record high jump, completed by Huaso and Captain Alberto Larraguibel in 1949.

The world record for the highest obstacle cleared by a horse and rider was set on February 5, 1949, by Huaso and his rider, Captain Alberto Larraguibel. The Thoroughbred stallion and his Chilean rider cleared a fence measuring 2.47 metres (8 ft 1 in) high. This record still stands today. A purported dispute to this record is of American Freddy Wettach with his horse King's Own, 1927 where they cleared an obstacle of almost 2.53m. This record remains controversial because while it was witnessed and photographed, the event did not take place during a sanctioned competition. The Show Jumping Hall of Fame acknowledges Wettlach's claim as the highest. These records are held separately from the record height jumped in Puissance classes, regularly held high jump competitions at horse shows. The record for highest obstacle cleared by a horse and rider in a Puissance competition is held by Leonardo and his rider, Franke Sloothaak. In 1991, this pair jumped a puissance wall standing 2.39 metres (7 ft 10 in). Horses are also capable of jumping obstacles of great width. The world record long jump was set on April 26, 1975, by a horse named Something ridden by a Mr. Andre Ferreira. This pair jumped a distance of 8.4 metres (28 ft).

== See also ==
- Equestrian at the Summer Olympics
- Field hunter
- Horse jumping obstacles
- Horse show
- Hurdling (horse race)
- National Hunt racing
- Show hunter
  Hunter hack
  Show hunter (British)
- Steeplechase
