= Hack (horse) =

Term in equestrianism

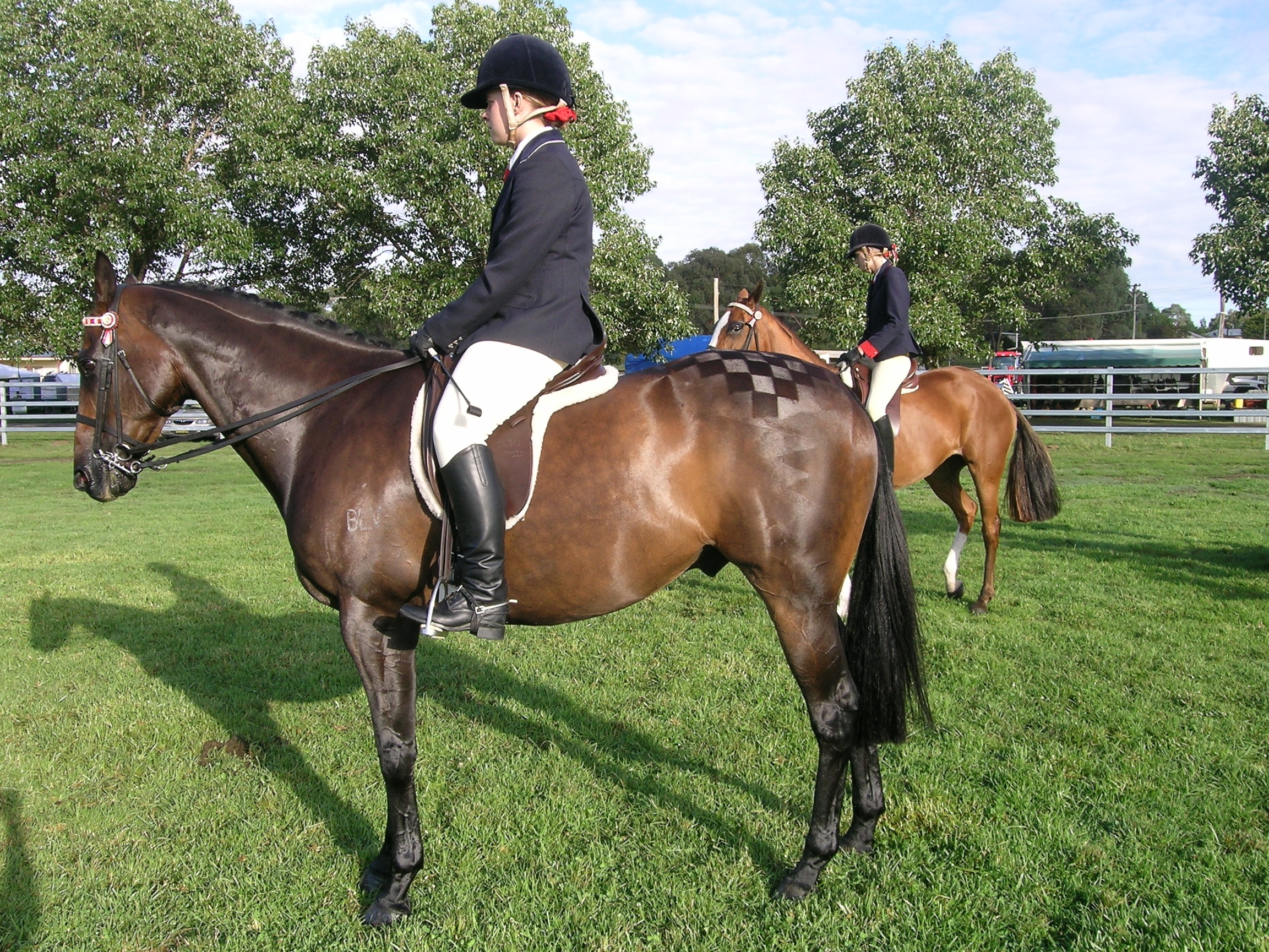
Hacks at a horse show.

Hack within the activity of equestrianism commonly refers to one of two things: as a verb, it describes the act of pleasure riding for light exercise, and as a breed (Hackney/hack), it is a type of horse used for riding and pulling carriages. The term is sometimes used to describe certain types of exhibition or horse show classes where quality and good manners of the horse are particularly important.

== Etymology ==
It is believed that word originated from Hackney, Middlesex (now absorbed into London), an area where horses were pastured. Historically, the term dates to a time when carriage horses were used for riding. These animals were called "hacks" as a contraction of "hackney", and was originally used to describe an ordinary riding horse, particularly one for hire. The term also gave a name to a specific horse breed developed in England, known as the Hackney, a lively riding horse which is noted for its trotting ability and is used today for both riding and driving. The term suggests an animal of good disposition and calm manner, particularly one suitable for an inexperienced or purely recreational rider.

== Uses ==
The verb form "to hack" or "hacking" is associated with English riding and used more often in eastern Canada and the eastern United States than in western North America, where the term trail riding is more prevalent. In some places, organized hacks are held, where a group of riders go out together for a short, relatively easy ride, either on their own horses or on rented animals. Such rides are often geared for inexperienced riders.

Today, many grade horses are suitable for recreational riding as hacks and there is also a market for non-show quality registered horses to be used for hacking. Some show horses that have been retired from competition also are suitable as hacks, as the work is generally not too physically challenging for an older horse or one with minor health issues.

A "hack class" in general refers to horse show competition for hack-type horses where they are evaluated on ability to provide a comfortable ride for a person who is riding all day. In Australia, the term "hack" may be used synonymously with "show" in reference to the act of presenting or exhibiting a horse. In the UK, Canada and Australia, show hack classes are usually divided into different sections based upon the height of the horse or the type of rider who exhibits the horse. Classes may also be scheduled for sidesaddle, educated or pleasure hacks.

In the United States, horses compete in various "hack" classes. For example, show hack describes either the horses or a type of horse show class where horses are shown on the flat in English riding equipment and judged on manners, quality, conformation and way of going. Open "show hack" classes may also be divided by the size of the horse and if it is ridden astride or sidesaddle. Hunter hack is a class where horses are shown on the flat but also asked to jump a small number of fences, usually two. A bridle path hack class is a basic hunter type English pleasure class where jumping is not required.

== See also ==
- Hackney horse
- Hackney pony
- Hackney coach
- Hunter hack
