= Guy Williams (equestrian) =

British showjumper

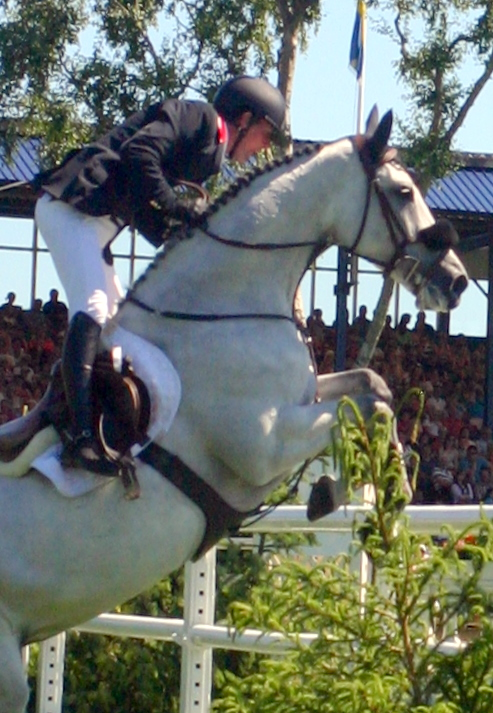
- Guy Williams riding Richi Rich at Hickstead Jumping Derby 2011

Personal information
- Nationality: British
- Born: 11 July 1971 (age 54)

Sport
- Sport: Equestrian

Guy Williams (born 11 July 1971) is a British showjumper, ranked number four in Great Britain as of July 2011, part of the GBR equestrian team, and winner of a number of prestigious titles including the British Jumping Derby in 2010.

Guy was also part of the bronze medal-winning team in Madrid in 2011.

== Personal life ==
His daughter, Maisy Williams, also competes in show jumping, including puissance.
