= Maisy Williams =

British showjumper

Personal information
- Nationality: British

Sport
- Sport: Equestrian

Maisy Williams is a British show jumper. She is the daughter of British international show jumper Guy Williams.

== Career ==
In May 2023, she won the Junior Grand Prix at the Youth Show jumping Festival in Compiegne in France on Devil VD To Jo Pe Hoeve. In June 2023, riding Uncle Braun DK Z, she secured her first international arena win at the All England Jumping Course at Hickstead in the Billy Stud Auction British 6-year-old Championship. In July 2023, she jumped a clear final on Devil VD To Jo Pe Hoeve to help Britain win a bronze medal in the team event at the Junior Nations Cup at the FEI European Championships. In September 2023, she won the Arena UK puissance with a 6 ft 7inch clearance on Dalton D'Hoyo.

In April 2024, she won the Under 25 Grand Prix on Dalton D’Hoyo at the Pony of the Year Show. In June 2024, she competing against he father in finishing third in the Puissance at the Bolesworth International Equestrian Festival. In October 2024, she made her Horse of the Year Show debut and won the Senior Newcomers Championship riding Billy Heinz. In December 2024, she made her debut at the London International Horse Show in the Puissance.

== Personal life ==
From York, she is the daughter of British international show jumper Guy Williams.
