= London International Horse Show =

Equestrian competition in the United Kingdom

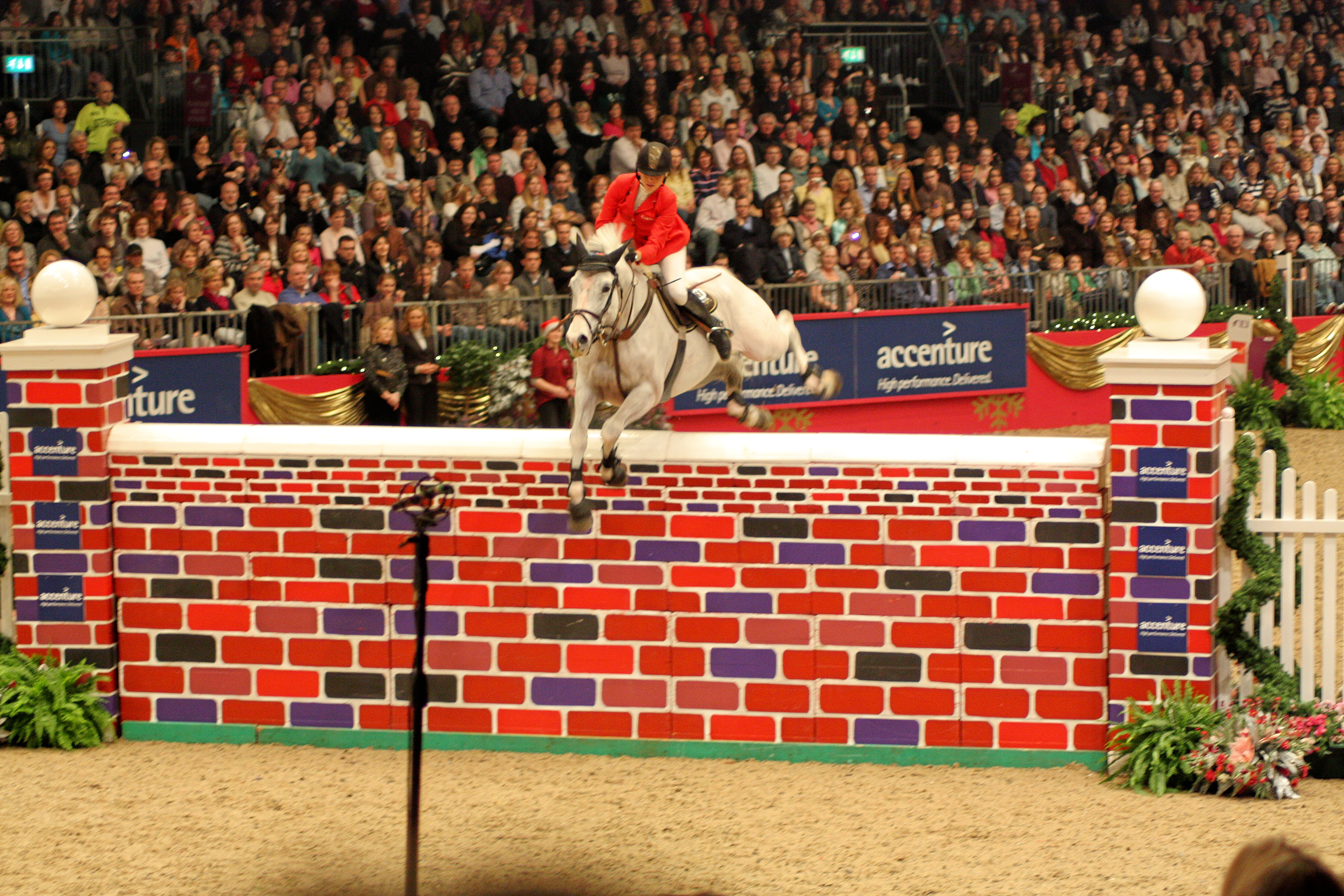
Ellen Whitaker with Ladina B at the Accenture puissance at 2008 Olympia London International Horse Show

The London International Horse Show, formerly the Olympia London International Horse Show, is one of the UK's biggest equestrian competitions. It is best known as the host of the UK legs of the FEI World Cup series in dressage, show jumping and driving, however it also has multiple other showjumping classes, as well as fun competitions such as a Shetland pony race and a dog agility competition. Many competitions are broadcast live by the BBC, and all are streamed. The show is held over six days during the week preceding Christmas, and typically involves over 400 horses and ponies.

Previously held at Olympia, London, it has been hosted by ExCeL London since 2021. The show is run by the HPower Group, with Simon Brooks-Ward as Director. The event is owned by Clarion Events.

== History ==
The first London International Horse Show in its current form was held in 1907; however an agricultural show (known as the first great horse show) was held at the Olympia venue from 1888. Reginald Gardiner Heaton, a horse breeder from Chatteris in Cambridgeshire, is said to have thought up the show. Early in 1906, Gardiner Heaton invited friends to dinner with the intention of persuading them to organise an international show on similar lines to those in New York, Paris and Brussels. The dinner was successful and Reginald Heaton became the managing director, a post he held for over 25 years.

The inaugural show was attended by aristocracy and royalty including Edward VII, Alexandra of Denmark, George V, Princess Mary Adelaide of Cambridge, and the competitors were from countries including France, Italy, Belgium and Russia.

Lord Lonsdale, then president of the National Sporting Club of Britain, was the show's first President. The directors listed in early programmes included many prominent and wealthy patrons, with at least 10 dukes, 11 marquises, 54 earls, 25 viscounts, 80 barons, and 28 knights who were made honorary vice-presidents.

The show was closed during World War I and suffered from the economic instability and industrialisation between the wars. In 1939 the last International Horse Show was held at Olympia. It was resurrected in 1947 at a different venue in White City, London. However, in December 1972, Reginald Heaton and Raymond Brooks-Ward decided to bring a horse show back to Olympia. "Olympia – The London International Horse Show" became a highlight of the equestrian calendar and part of the equestrian Christmas tradition.

The Olympia London International Horse Show celebrated its 100th anniversary in 2007 as "one of Europe's oldest equine competitions". In 2010 it was held as CSI 5*-W (Show Jumping World Cup event) and CDI-W (Dressage World Cup event).

The 2020 Olympia London International Horse Show was cancelled due to the COVID-19 pandemic. In 2021 the show moved to a new venue at ExCeL London and was renamed the London International Horse Show. In 2023, the organisers announced a new second full-size arena for the show which is named the New Horizon Plastics London Arena. This houses additional showing classes in association with the BSPS, the BSHA and the ASAO. It also houses additional Kennel Club Dog Agility Classes and various Masterclasses with key individuals from the equestrian world.

== Competitions ==
The show has FEI competitions in driving, dressage and show jumping as well as showing and mounted games.

Driving
There are three driving events: the Extreme Driving and two FEI World Cup competitions.

Dressage
The show hosts FEI Dressage World Cup qualifiers, which usually take the format of a Grand prix on the first day, and Freestyle Dressage to Music on the second where riders are allowed to choreograph their own routine to music incorporating a number of compulsory movements.

Showjumping
The show has showjumping classes on each day of the show, most with Christmas themed names such as the Longines Christmas Cracker. These culminate in the 1.60m Longines FEI Show Jumping World Cup on the Sunday and the London Grand Prix on the last day of the show. Riders generally compete over the week and have the chance of gaining points in each class for leading rider. The event also has non FEI competitions including the Puissance, the Six Bar, accumulators, the Mini-Major Relay and the Markel Champions Challenge where jockeys compete at showjumping to raise money for the Injured Jockeys Fund.

Showing
The show hosts the final for the British Show Pony Society Mountain and Moorland championships and the London International Senior Showing Series Championships. In 2023, a new second arena was announced, and with it the London International Showing Series; the Finals of which take place at the show.

== Displays ==
In more recent years, the show also has equestrian displays which show different forms of horsemanship from around the world. Participants have included the Metropolitan Police Service's mounted regiment, the Household Cavalry and the King's Troop, Royal Horse Artillery.

Each year there is also a Shetland Pony Grand National in which a group of riders aged 8–14 ride Shetland ponies around a track over small jumps mimicking the Grand National steeplechase held at Aintree. Many of these riders, such as Sam Twiston-Davies, have progressed to become professional jockeys. All proceeds from the event go to the Bob Champion Cancer Trust.

Every season concludes with the Christmas Finale, a mix of theatricals, dancing and singing, ending with a visit from Father Christmas in a horse-drawn carriage.

== Kennel Club dog agility ==
The show hosts popular dog agility classes from The Kennel Club in several sections including ABC (Anything But Collie) and small, medium and large dog breeds. Directed by their handlers, dogs run around a course jumping over obstacles to compete for the fastest time.

== Gallery ==
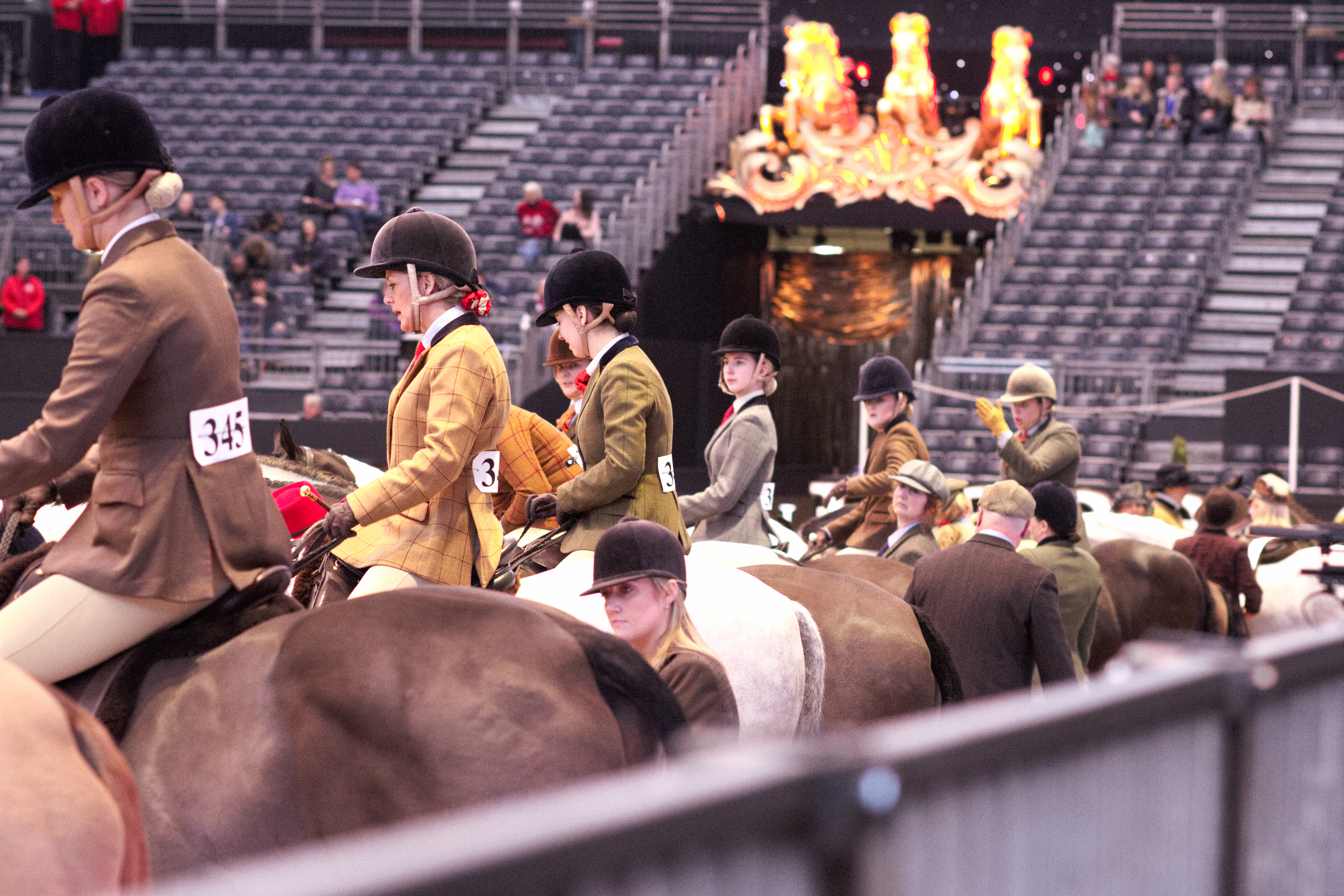
Line up in the veteran class at Olympia Horse Show 2017

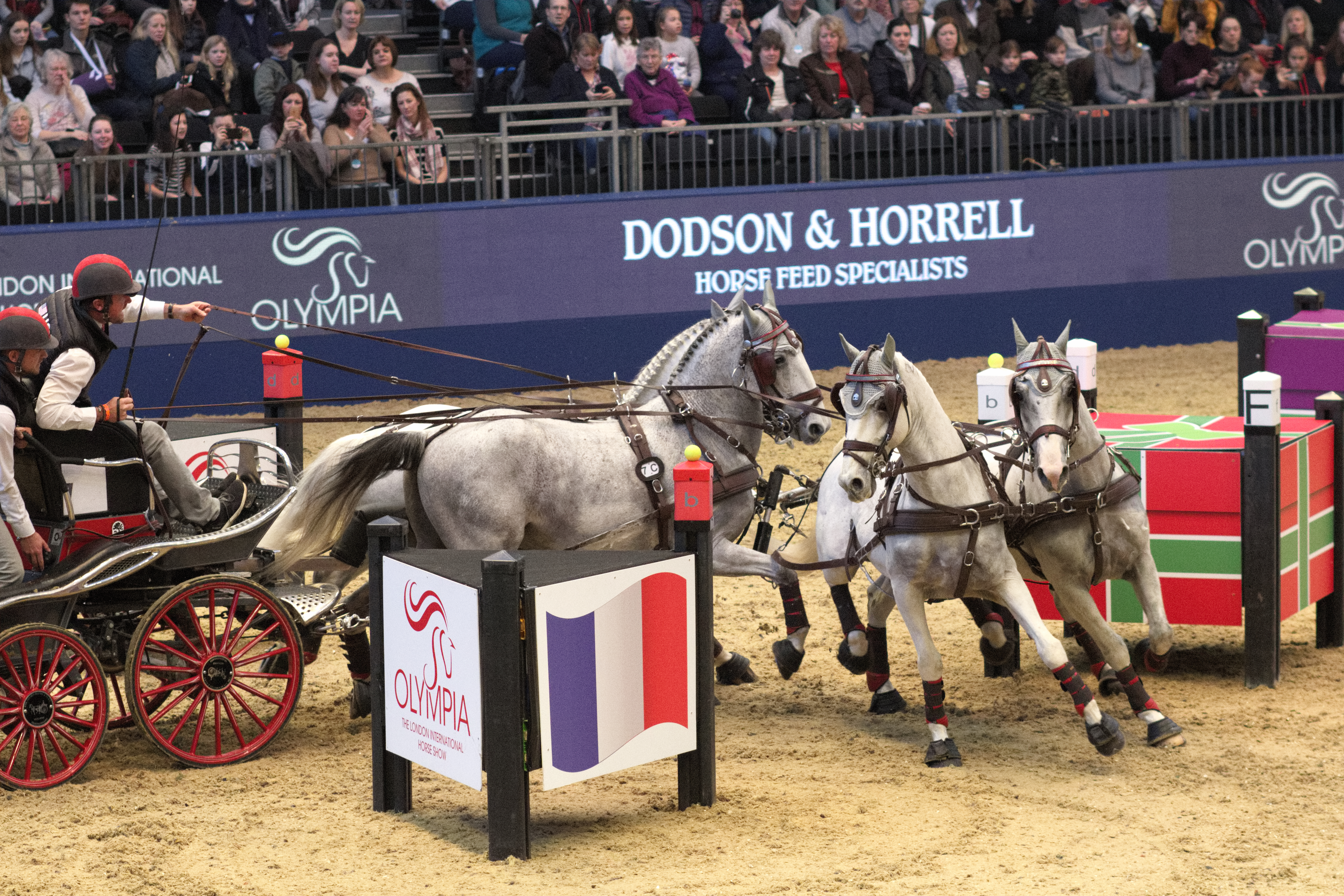
Fei Driving World Cup at the Olympia Horse Show 2017

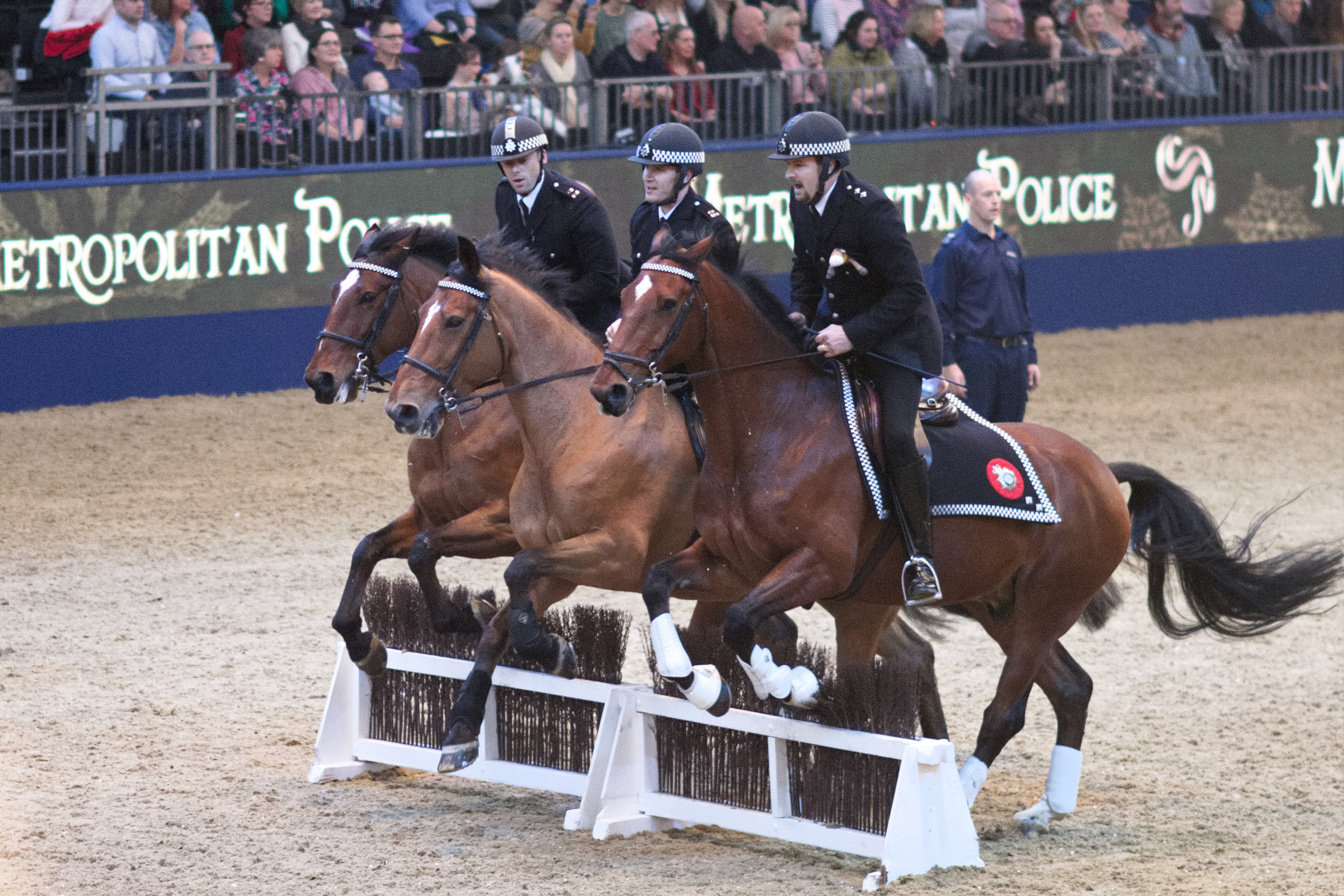
The Metropolitan police mounted department demo at Olympia Horse Show 2017

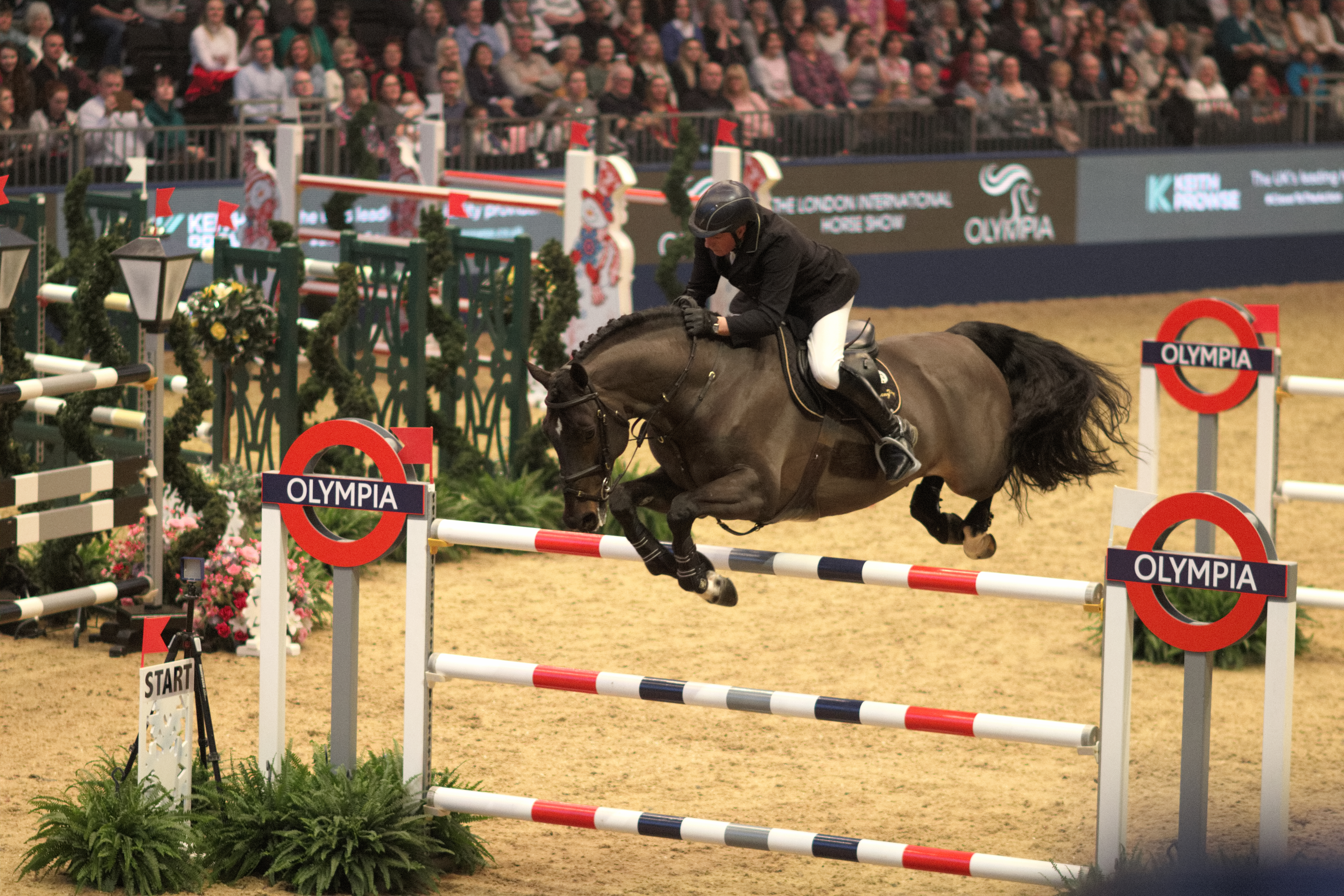
John Whitaker and Argento jumping at Olympia 2017

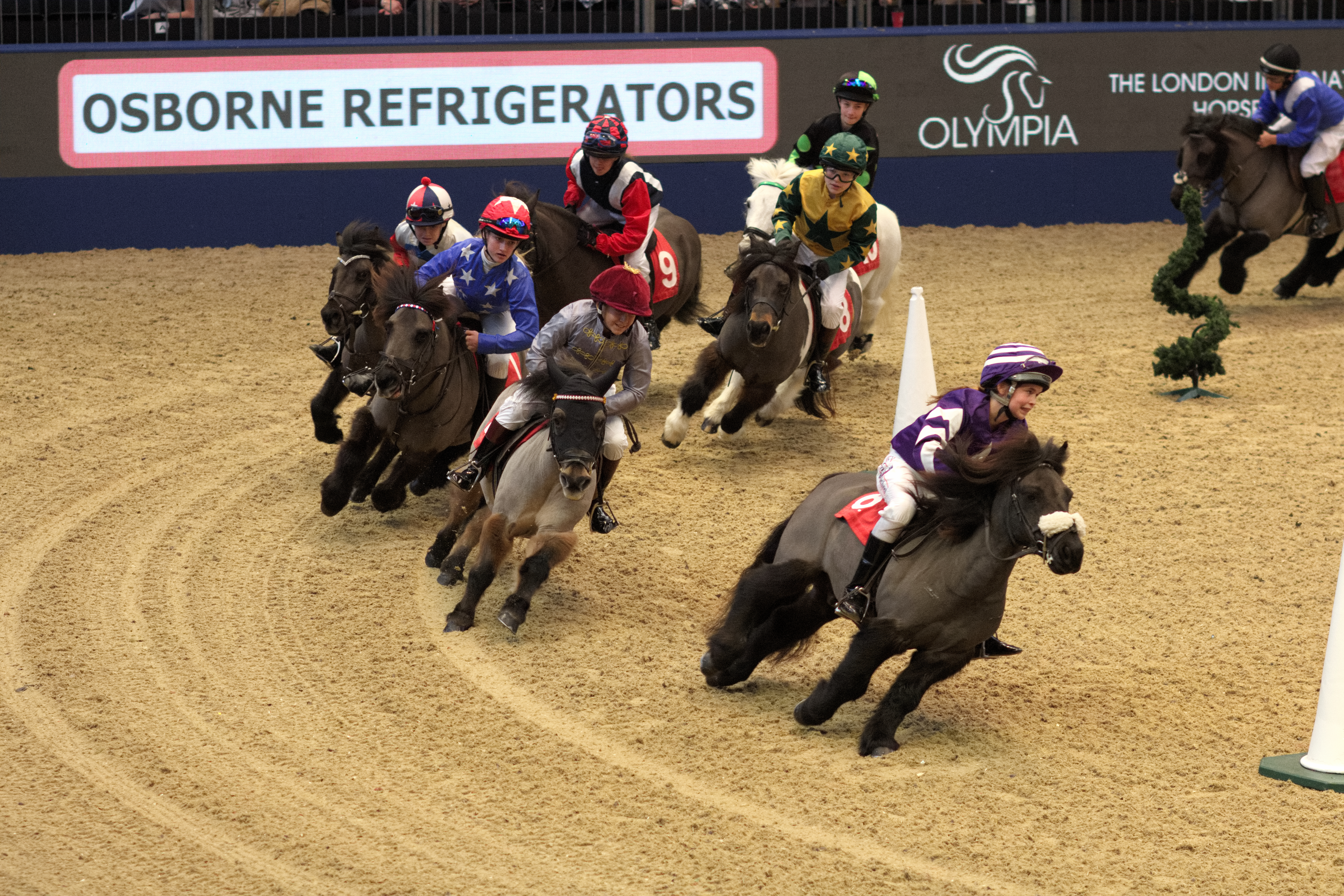
The Shetland Grand National at Olympia 2017

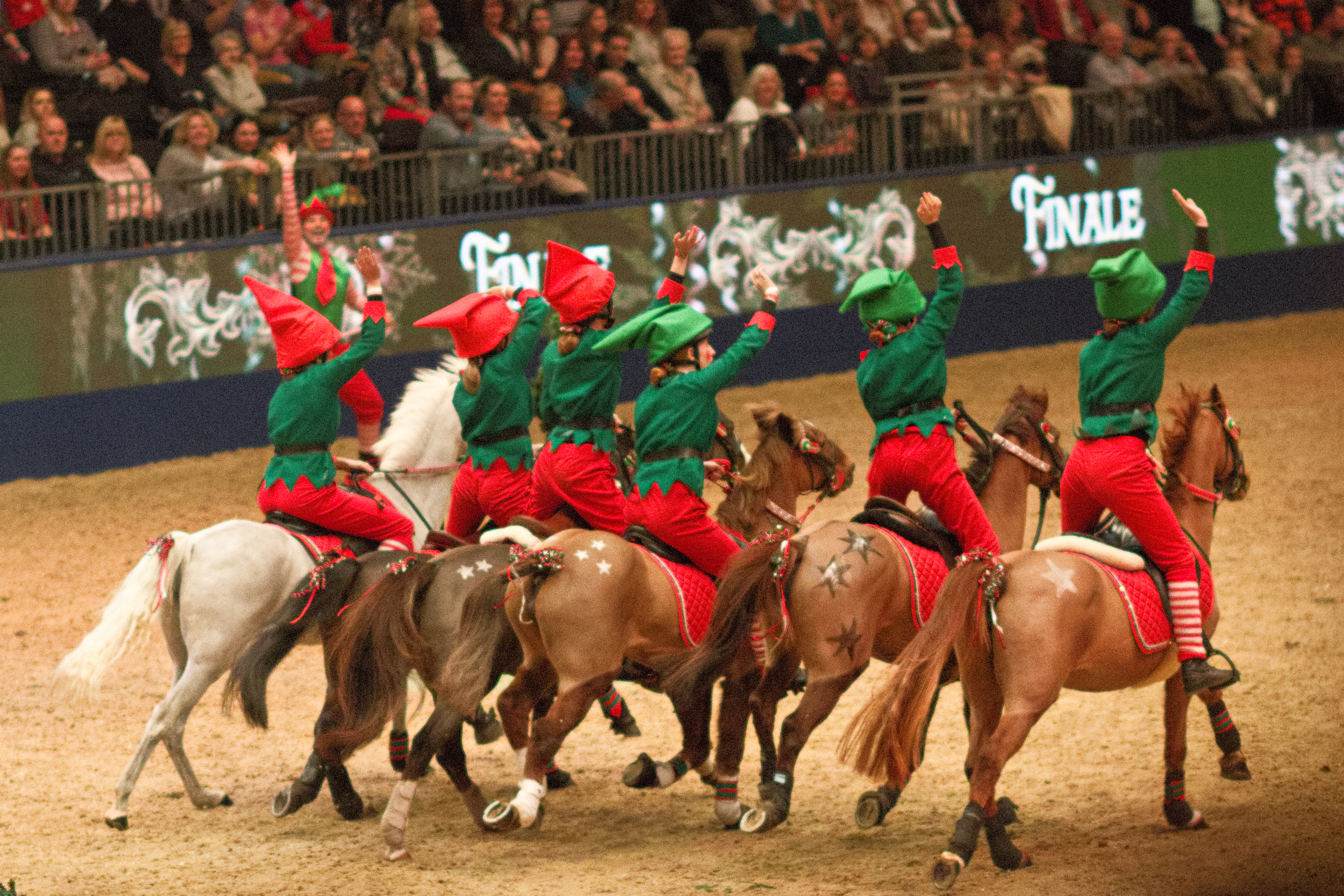
Pony Club Games team dressed as elves as part of the Christmas finale at Olympia 2017
