= Puissance =

High-jump competition in horse show jumping

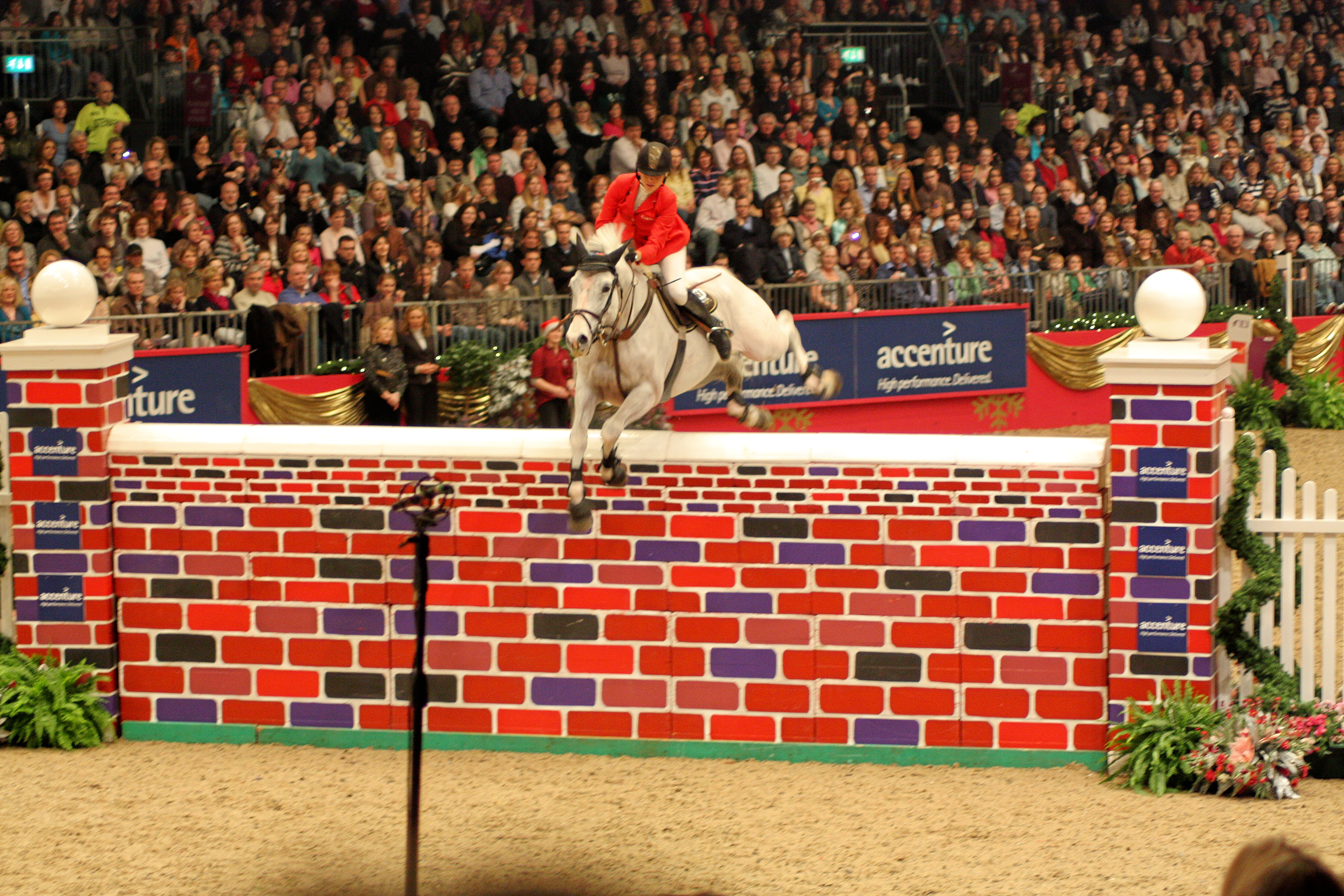
Accenture puissance at 2008 Olympia - The London Horse Show

Puissance is the high-jump competition in the equestrian sport of show jumping.

== Description ==
The competition involves a maximum of five rounds - opening round followed by four jump-offs, not against the clock. The first round consists of four to six large single obstacles including the puissance wancluded. In the event of equality after the fifth round, riders share first prize.

The puissance wall often has become taller than 2 metres (6 ft 7 in). The current indoor record for puissance is held by German rider Franke Sloothaak, who in June 1991 jumped 2.40 m (7 ft 10 in) in Chaudfontaine, Belgium on Optiebeurs Golo, breaking his previous record set on Leonardo.

The puissance is similar to, but not the same as, the equestrian high jump competition, which consists of a single, slightly sloping fence made from a hedge topped with timber rails. The record for the high jump stands at 2.47 m (8 ft 1 in), and was achieved by Captain Alberto Larraguibel Morales riding Huaso ex-Faithfull, at the Official International Event at Viña del Mar, Chile, on 5 February 1949.

Puissance, (from French puissance), is also a word meaning "power". The event has been contested once at the Olympic Games, in 1900.

== See also ==
- Show jumping
