= Huaso (horse) =

High-jumping horse

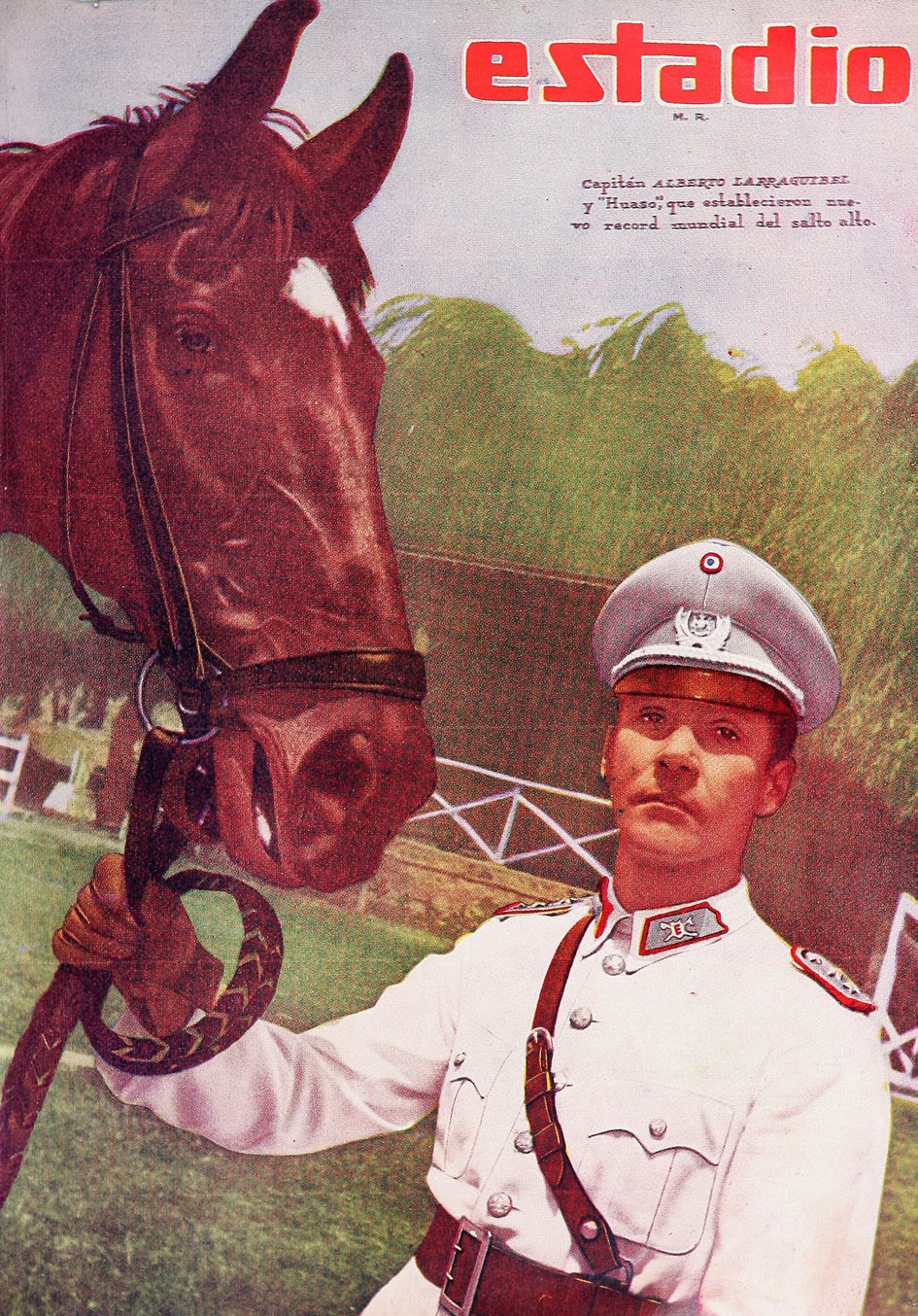
- Breed: Thoroughbred
- Sire: Henry Lee
- Grandsire: Your Majesty
- Dam: Trémula
- Maternal grandsire: Lomond
- Sex: Stallion
- Foaled: 1933
- Died: August 24, 1961
- Colour: Chestnut

Huaso (1933 – August 24, 1961) was a horse that, ridden by Chilean Captain Alberto Larraguibel, set the high-jump world record on February 5, 1949, by jumping 2.47 m (8 ft 1 in) in Viña del Mar, Chile, one of the longest-running unbroken sport records in history, at 70 years.

Huaso was born in Chile in 1933, and was originally named Faithful. He started as a race horse, but never achieved good results because he was too nervy and unruly. After six years of failure, the horse was purchased in the early 1940s by Chilean Army captain Gaspar Lueje, who thought he could be trained for Dressage. When Faithful was just starting his training he suffered an accident, impaling himself on the back quarter, and almost having to be put down. The horse eventually recovered, but acquired a slight limp in the left hind, which effectively put an end to any chances in that discipline.

As a last option he was moved to show jumping. Faithful still retained his potency, but nonetheless, he was still too nervy and difficult to control, and he wasn't showing any promise in jumping. One afternoon, while he was being trained riderless on the enclosure, he simply bolted and jumped over the surrounding wall, which was over 2 meters high. Casually, he was spotted by an Army horse master who happened to pass by, and who right away decided to purchase and destine him for high-jump.

The horse was then taken to the Army Cavalry Academy, in the city of Quillota. There, the name was changed to Huaso and he was handed to Captain Alberto Larraguibel for training. He trained the horse for over two years specifically for the world record. He first targeted the national record, then the South-American and finally, the world one.

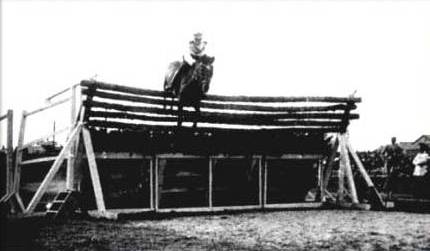
Another angle of the jump

On February 5, 1949, both rider and horse were finally ready. The attempts were held at the Coraceros Regiment in Viña del Mar, Chile. On the words of Captain Larraguibel:

On the first try, I miscalculated the distance and allowed the horse to refuse. If I had then applied the whip, the horse would have become nervous, because an animal understands when it's being asked to perform above his capabilities. In the second jump, I must have made a mistake of a centimeter or so, because Huaso passed the hands but touched with the belly and the hinds, and knocked down the obstacle... there was only the third and last attempt left. I recalculated again, and in the precise moment we flew... The most difficult moment was the apex of the jump. My eyes were about 4 meters above the ground and I had the sensation of falling head first. My slightest tremor would have been felt by Huaso; who then would have left his hinds behind and we would have crashed together, but we went over. The moment seemed to last forever. I didn't hear a single shout and thought that something had gone wrong, but I couldn't hear the obstacles falling either...

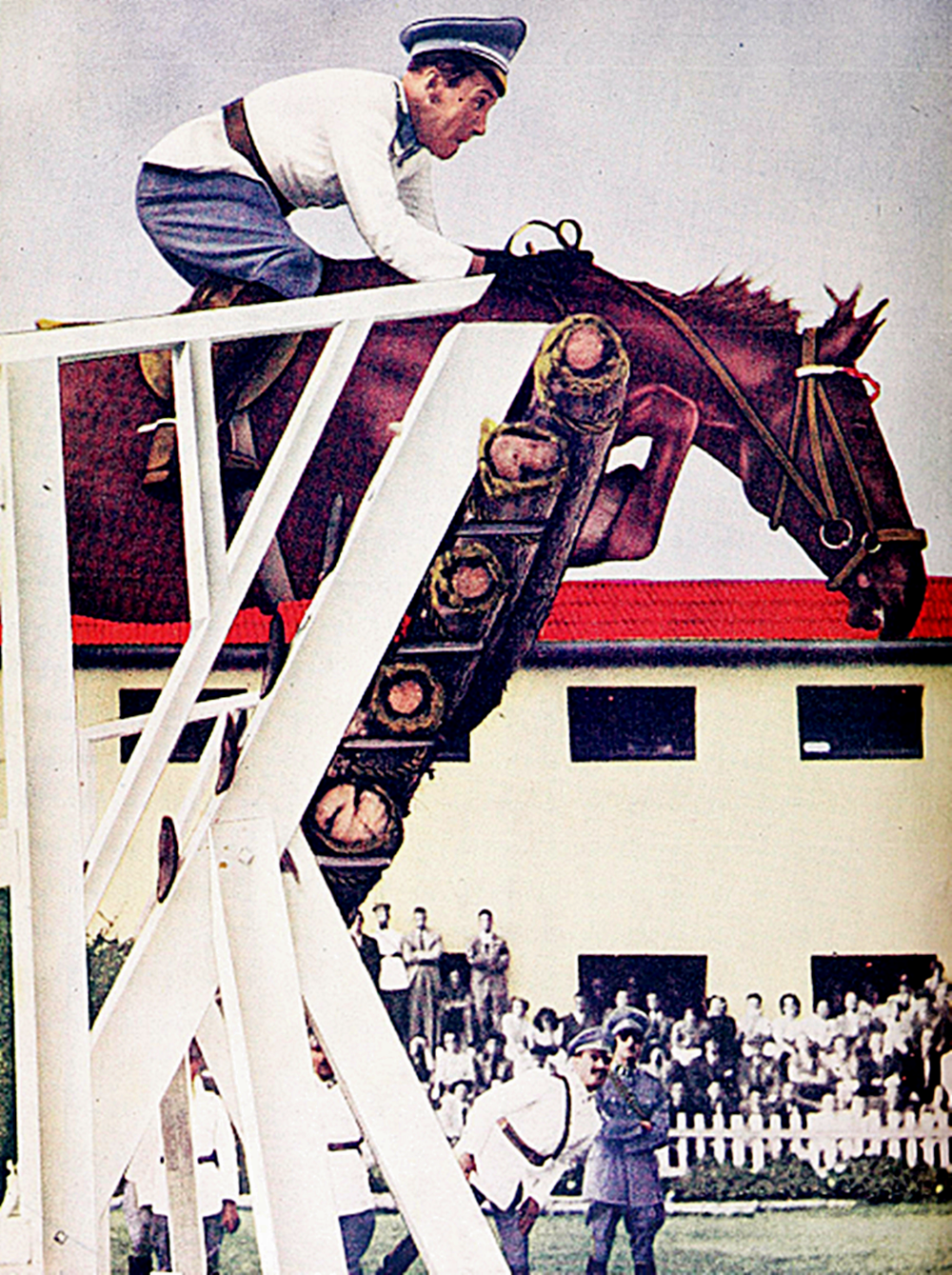
High-Jump 2.47

When they broke the world record Huaso was already 16 years old, quite old for a result of that magnitude. After the record, the horse was retired and never ridden again. He roamed freely until he died naturally on August 24, 1961, at the age of 28. Huaso is buried on the same Cavalry Academy where he spent his last years.

Larraguibel & Huaso's commemorative monument in Vina del Mar is an impressive statue : a nude man and a nude woman -Faith?- support the leaping Horse. The commemorative plate reads As for me it was like sending my heart flying over the other side of the jump and then going to rescue it. (Larraguibel)

The High Jump world record should not be confused with the Puissance world record. The Puissance is a series of bricks built as a wall rather than angled poles as used in the high jump. The word 'Puissance' means 'power' in French. The current indoor Puissance world record stands at 2.40 m (7 ft 10 in) and was set in June 1991 in Chaudfontaine, Belgium by German rider Franke Sloothaak on Optiebeurs Golo, breaking his previous record set on Leonardo.

== See also ==
- List of historical horses
