= Muscular system of the horse =

Anatomy of muscles in horses

== Types of muscle ==
As in all vertebrates, horses have three types of muscle:

- Skeletal muscle: this type of muscle contributes to movement and posture, and is consciously controlled (voluntary muscle). While some muscles attach solely to skin or cartilage (muscles of facial expression, etc.), contraction of skeletal muscles more commonly leads to the muscle pulling a tendon, which in turn pulls a bone, resulting in either flexion or extension of a joint. Skeletal muscles are usually arranged in antagonistic pairs in opposition to each other, with one flexing the joint (a flexor muscle) and the other extending it (extensor muscle).
- Smooth muscle: this type of muscle is controlled by the autonomic nervous system (making it an involuntary muscle type). Smooth muscle is involved in digestion and other organs such as the eye
- Cardiac: involuntary muscle that causes the heart to beat. This type of muscle has high numbers of mitochondria, allowing it to be fatigue-resistant.

== Build of skeletal muscle ==
Skeletal muscle is made up of several muscle bundles, which in turn are made up of muscle fibers. Muscle fibers have bundles of myofibrils, which are all parallel to one another, and are able to contract due to actin and myosin. Muscle is covered by a fibrous tissue called fascia, to which other muscles can attach, and muscles attach to bone via tendons.

== Tendons of the lower leg ==
Tendons attach muscles and bone, and are classified as flexors (flex a joint) or extensors (extend a joint). However, some tendons will flex multiple joints and extend another (the flexor tendons of the hind limb, for example, will flex the fetlock, pastern, and coffin joint, but extend the hock joint). In this case, they are classified according to whether they flex or extend the joints of the digit.

The following tendons are the main tendons found in the lower leg. When they pass over a joint, they are protected in a tendon sheath, which contains synovial fluid as a lubricant.

- Common digital extensor: the common digital extensor muscle becomes tendon in the bottom third of the radius and continues down the front of the leg. The tendon pulls upward to extend the carpal, pastern, and coffin joints. It is the major extensor tendon of the leg. However, unlike the flexor tendons, a horse with a damaged or non-functional "extensor unit" (i.e. tendon and musculature) is not lame, but rapidly learns to compensate by "flicking" the lower limb using the carpal or tarsal extensor units.
- Lateral digital extensor: the lateral digital extensor muscle becomes the lateral digital extensor tendon at the proximal portion of the metacarpus. The tendon continues down the front of the leg and inserts into the proximal portion of the first phalanx. Important in the treatment of stringhalt in the hind limb. Extends the carpal, pastern, and coffin joints
- Deep digital flexor: 3 tendons of the deep digital flexor muscle travel distally and join at the carpus, where they pass through the carpal canal, and travel distally along the back of the leg, finally inserting into the palmar side of the third phalanx. Below the knee/hock, the tendon is superficial to the suspensory ligament, but deep to the SDFT. Fairly commonly injured by horses doing fast work, the DDFT is round in cross section.
- Superficial digital flexor: Runs down the back of the leg, behind the carpus and cannon, branches below the fetlock and inserts into the distal side of the 1st phalanx and proximal side of the 2nd phalanx. Flexes the elbow, carpus and lower joints. Additionally, the superior check ligament inserts into this tendon from the caudal side of the radius. The SDFT is the most commonly injured tendon, and appears oval or flattened in cross section.

== Main skeletal muscles of the horse ==
=== Muscles of the neck, shoulder, chest, and back ===
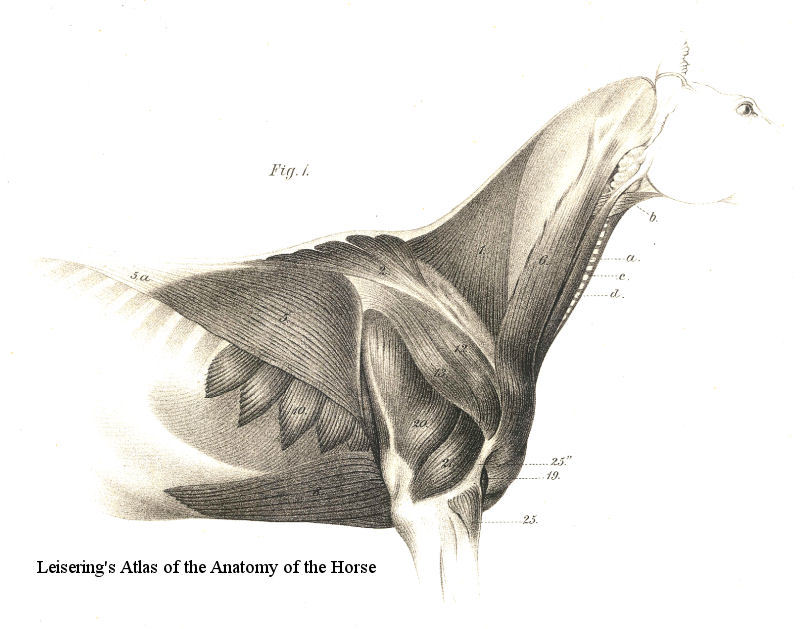

- Brachiocephalicus: originates from the temporal bone, atlas, and 3rd and 4th cervical vertebrae, and inserts on the humerus. Pulls the forelimb forward, raises scapula in collection.
- Cervicalis ascendens: originates at the transverse process of the final 3-4 cervical vertebrae, inserts into the first rib.
- Cutaneous coli: originates from the cariniform cartilage and inserts into the cervical fascia. Lies on the ventral parts of the neck (near the jugular groove).
- Deltoideus: originates at the scapula, inserts into the humerus. Helps to flex the scapulohumeral joint.
- Intertransversales lumborum: between the transverse processes of 1-4th lumbar vertebrae.
- Intertransversalis colli: occurs between the transverse articular space of the vertebrae, and the lateral side of the vertebrae.
- Latissimus dorsi: originates at the supraspinous ligament & thoracolumbar fascia, inserts in the humerus. Antagonist to brachiocephalicus. Supports the back, helps to pull the body of the horse forward when a limb is extended and placed on the ground, also helps to flex the scapulohumeral joint.
- Longissimus capitis: originates on the first 2 thoracic vertebrae and the cervical vertebrae. Inserts into the atlas.
- Longissimus costarum: originates on lumbar dorsal fascia, insert on caudal side of ribs, and the cervical vertebrae.
- Longus colli: originates from the cervical vertebrae and the first 5-6 thoracic vertebrae.
- Masseter: cheek muscle, moves the jaw open and closed and allows for chewing
- Multifidus cervicis: segmented muscles that act as stabilizers between vertebral segments, consisting of five bundles on the dorsal aspect of the vertebrae with portions spanning between one and four intervertebral spaces, originating on the second cervical vertebra and blending seamlessly with the multifidus thoracis.
- Multifidus thoracis: originates in the thoracic region as a continuation of the multifidus cervicis, with attachments on the dorsal spinous processes and vertebral bodies, having a similar intersegmental stabilizing effect on the spine. Considered to be a key postural stabilizing muscle system of the core.
- Obliquus capitis cranialis: originate on ventral side of wing of atlas, inserts on occipital bone.
- Obliquus capitis caudalis: originates on dorsal side of spine and the articular process of the axis, insert into dorsal side of the atlas' wing.
- Omohyoideus: originates from the subscapular fascia of the scapulohumeral joint, inserts in the hyoid. Allows for flexion of the jaw.
- Omotransversarius: originates in the atlas and the cervical vertebrae (C2-C4), continues down dorsal to the brachiocephalicus to the point of the shoulder, then combines with the trapezius and inserts into the humerus. Helps raise the scapula and move the limb forward.
- Pectoral muscles: there are 4 pectorals, and they all function in adduction of the limb. The pectoralis descendens (cranial superficial pectoral) originates from the cariniform cartilage of the sternum, and inserts into the humerus. The pectoralis transversus (transverse superficial pectoral) originates from the ventral side of the sternum and inserts on the proximal third of the horse's forearm. The largest of the pectorals, the pectoralis profundus (caudal deep pectoral), originates on the caudal side of the sternum, and inserts into the humerus and onto the tendon of the coracobrachialis muscle. The pectoralis ascendens (caudal superficial pectoral), or the subclavius, originates on the cranial side of the sternum, and inserts into the dorsal side of the supraspinatus muscle.
- Rectus capitis dorsalis major and rectus capitis dorsalis minor: originate on spinous process of axis and dorsal side of the atlas, respectively, both insert into occipital bone.
- Rectus capitis ventralis minor and rectus capitis lateralis: originate from the atlas, insert into the occipital bone.
- Rhomboideus: originates from the nuchal and supraspinous ligaments, inserts on the medial scapular cartilage, is under the trapezius. Helps to raise the shoulder toward the head, and raise the neck upward.
- Scalenus: originates on the cranial and lateral side of the first rib, inserts into the transverse process of the cervical vertebrae (C4-C7).
- Semispinalis capitis: originates on the cervical vertebrae and first 6-7 thoracic vertebrae. Inserts on the occipital bone, ventral to the nuchal crest.
- Serratus dorsalis cranial and caudal: originates on the lumbar dorsal fascia, inserts into the lateral side of the 5-12 or 10-18th rib respectively.
- Serratus ventralis: includes the serratus cervicis, which originates from the final 4-5 cervical vertebrae and inserts into the scapula, and the serratus thoracis, which originates on the lateral side of the first 8-9 ribs and inserts into the scapula. The two muscles are antagonists to each other, with the serratus cervicis pulling the scapula towards the neck, and the serratus thoracis pulling the scapula away from the neck. They help move the forelimb forward and back.
- Spinalis: part of the longissimus dorsi.
- Splenius: originates from the 3rd-5th thoracic vertebrae, the dorsal scapular ligament, and the nuchal ligament. Inserts on the nuchal crest, the atlas, and the 3rd-5th cervical vertebrae.
- Sternocephalicus: originates from the cariniform cartilage of the sternum, inserts into the caudal side of the mandible. Lowers the head.
- Sternothyroideus and sternohyoideus: originate from cartilage of the sternum, insert on caudal side of the lamina of the larynx and on the hyoid bone.
- Trapezius: originates along the dorsal side of the neck near the poll, inserts on the spine of the scapula. Includes the trapezius cervicalis (originates along the cervical vertebrae) and trapezius thoracis (originates along the thoracic vertebrae). Helps to raise the shoulder, also involved in moving the scapulohumeral joint. Well-developed if horse is worked round and "up through the back."

=== Muscles of the tail ===
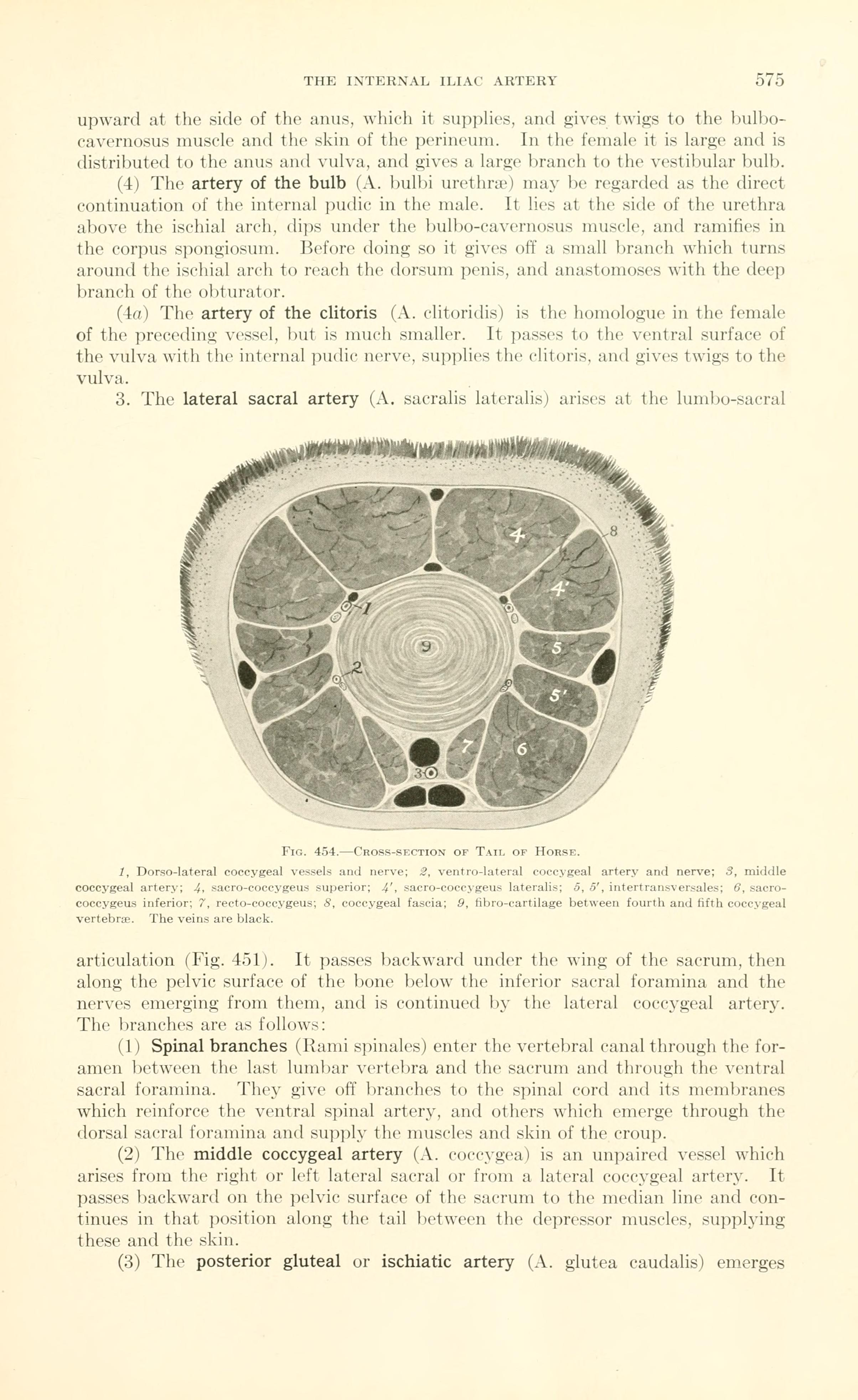
Cross-section of tail (coccygeus muscle not shown). Diagram from Sisson's A text-book of Veterinary Anatomy.

The coccygeus, intertransversales caudae, sacro-coccygeus dorsalis, sacro-coccygeus lateralis, and sacro-coccygeus ventralis muscles control tail movement.

=== Muscles of the forelimb ===
- Biceps brachii: originates from the supraglenoid tubercle on the cranial aspect of the scapula and inserts into the radial tuberosity. Extends the shoulder and flexes the elbow, and is the part of the stay apparatus that keeps the elbow and shoulder from bending.
- Brachialis: originates from the caudoproximal side of the humerus, inserts into the craniomedial side of proximal radius. Flexes the elbow joint.
- Anconeus: originates from the distal side of the caudal humerus, inserts into the lateral side of the olecranon. Raises the joint capsule to help prevent it from undue pressure during extension.
- Tensor fasciae antebrachii: originates from the tendon of the latissimus dorsi and the caudal side of the scapula, inserts on the olecranon. Covers the medial side of the triceps bracii. Helps to extend the elbow, albeit slightly.
- Triceps brachii: has three heads which originate and insert into separate places: the caudal side of the scapula and into the lateral & caudal side of the olecranon, from the humerus and into the lateral side of the olecranon, and from the medial side of the humerus and into the medial and cranial side of the olecranon. The triceps brachii is the most important extensor of the elbow. Important part of the stay apparatus to keep the elbow fixed.
- Extensor carpi radialis: originates from the humerus, continues distally along the dorsal side of the radius, and inserts on the metacarpal tuberosity. Flexes the elbow, extends the carpus. Also used in the stay apparatus to fix the carpus.
- Common digital extensor: part originates from the humerus and travels distally, to become the common digital extensor tendon at the bottom third of the radius (see above). The other part originates from the lateral tuberosity of the radius, and inserts into the tendon. This muscle extends the carpal, pastern, and coffin joints. It also flexes the elbow.
- Lateral digital extensor: originates from the lateral tuberosity of the radius and from the ulna, becomes the lateral digital extensor at the proximal portion of the metacarpus. This muscle extends the carpal and fetlock joints.
- Extensor carpi obliquus: originates from the radius and inserts into the top of the second metacarpal. Helps to extend the carpus.
- Flexor carpi radialis: originates from the humerus and inserts into the proximal side of the second metacarpal. Flexes the elbow, extends the carpus.
- Ulnaris lateralis: originates on the lateral side of the humerus, inserts into the accessory carpal bone and on the proximal side of the lateral splint bone. Flexes the carpus, extends the elbow.
- Superficial digital flexor: originates on the humerus and the caudal side of the radius, travels distally to become the superficial digital flexor tendon. Flexes the carpus and lower joints,
- Deep digital flexor: has three heads. One originates from the humerus, one on the proximal side of the radius, one on the proximal side of the ulna. Their tendons travel distally and join at the carpus, to become the deep digital flexor tendon (see above). Extends the elbow, flexes the carpus and lower joints.

=== Muscles of the hindquarters and lower hindleg ===
- Adductor: originates from the ventral side of the pubis and ischium, inserts into the caudal side of the femur (near the third trochanter) and the medial epicondyle of the femur (including the medial ligament of the femoropatellar joint). Adducts the limb, rotates the femur towards the medial plane, flexes the hip.
- Biceps femoris: originates from lateral sacroiliac ligaments, the coccygeal fascia and gluteal fascia, the intermuscular septum between the biceps femoris muscle and semitendinosus. Inserts into the caudal side of the femur, lateral patellar ligaments, cranial side of the patella, and calcanean tuber. Allows the leg to extend, for movement as well as kicking and rearing, and allows for abduction of the limb.
- Gemellus: a deep muscle that originates on lateral side of the ischium, inserts into the trochanteric fossa and ridge of the ischium. Helps rotate femur out.
- Gluteus superficialis: originates from the gluteal fascia and tuber coxae, inserts into the femur. Lies under the tensor fasciae latae muscle. Helps flex the hip and allows for it to abduct (rotate outward).
- Gluteus medius: originates from the ilium, from the aponeurosis of the longissimus dorsi muscle, from the gluteal fascia, and from the dorsal, lateral, and sacroiliac ligaments. Inserts into the femur and the ribs. Extends the hip and allows for the limb to abduct.
- Gluteus profundus: originates from the superior ischiatic spine and shaft of the ilium, inserts into the femur. Allows the limb to rotate inward.
- Gracilis: originates from the pelvic symphysis all the way to the pubic tendon. Inserts into the medial femorotibial ligament, medial side of the tibia, and medial patellar ligament. Adducts the limb.
- Iliacus: originates on ventral side of ilium, inserts into trochanter minor of femur with a tendon that intersects with a tendon of the psoas major. Lies under the medial gluteus muscle. Allows the hip to flex, rotates the femur to rotate out.
- Iliocapsularis originates on ilium, inserts into the proximal third of the femur. Raises femoropatellar joint capsule during flexion of stifle joint.
- Obturator externus: originates from the ventral side of the pubis ad ischium, inserts into the trochanteric fossa. Adducts the thigh.
- Obturator internus: originates on pelvic surface of the pubis, ischium, and ilium, and the wing of the sacrum, inserts into the trochanter fossa. Rotates femur outward.
- Pectineus: originates from the prepubic tendon, the accessory ligament, and the cranial side of the pubis. Inserts into the medial side of the femur. Adducts the limb, flexes the hip joint.
- Psoas minor: originates from first 4-5 lumbar and last 3 thoracic vertebrae, inserts into ilium. Flexes the pelvis.
- Psoas major: originates on lumbar vertebrae and last 2 ribs, inserts into the trochanter minor of femur with a tendon that intersects with a tendon of the iliacus. Allows the hip to flex and the femur to abduct.
- Quadratus femoris: originates on ventral side of ischium (cranial to semimembranous muscle), inserts into the caudal side of the femur. Adducts the thigh, extends the hip.
- Quadratus lumborum: originates on the side of the final 2 ribs, inserts into the wing of the sacrum. Allows the horse to flex laterally.
- Quadriceps femoris: has four heads which include the rectus femoris (originates from ilium, inserts into base and cranial of patella), vastus medialis (originates on medial side of femur, inserts into medial side of patella), vastus intermedius (originates from cranial side of femur, inserts into medial side of patella), and vastus lateralis (originates on lateral side of femur, inserts on lateral and cranial side of patella). These four muscles extend the femoropatellar joint (stifle joint). Additionally, the vastus intermedius raises the femoropatellar capsule, and the rectus femoris flexes the hip.
- Sartorius: originates from the iliac fascia and the tendon of the psoas minor, inserts into the medial patellar ligament and tuberosity of the tibia. Adducts the limb, flexes the hip.
- Semimembranosus: originates from ventral side of tuber ischii and caudal side of sacrosciatic ligament. Inserts into medial epicondyle of femur. Extends the hip joint, adducts the limb.
- Semitendinosus: originates from transverse processes of 1st and 2nd coccygeal vertebrae and ventral side of tuber ischium. Inserts into the cranial side of the tibia and the tuber calcis. Flexes the femoropatellar joint, causes inward rotation of the leg, and extends the tarsus and hip.
- Tensor fasciae latae: originates from the tuber coxae, inserts into the lateral patellar ligament, the cranial side of the tibia, and the broad aponeurosis of the patella. Helps to flex the hip and extend the femoropatellar joint.

== Equine muscular disorders ==
- Bowed tendon
- Compartment syndrome
- Equine Exertional Rhabdomyolysis (ER, "tying up")
- Equine polysaccharide storage myopathy (EPSM) or (PSSM)
- Glycogen Branching Enzyme Deficiency (GBED)
- Hypocalcemia
- Hyperkalemic periodic paralysis (HYPP)
- Muscle atrophy
- White muscle disease: seen in horses with a selenium deficiency

== Sources ==
Riegal, Ronald J. DVM, and Susan E. Hakola DVM. Illustrated Atlas of Clinical Equine Anatomy and Common Disorders of the Horse Vol. II. Equistar Publication, Limited. Marysville, OH. Copyright 2000.
