= Hunter hack =

Hunter hack is a type of English pleasure class where exhibitors in Hunt seat tack and attire perform on the flat at a walk, trot, canter and hand gallop, and then jump two low fences. The desired horse in this competition is to resemble a quiet, well-mannered working hunter rather than the more animated American-style show hack.

Hunter hacks are scored on their manners, gait, and conformation, as well as their ability to jump with an even arc and stride over the center of the fences. Points are taken off for excessive speed or slowness, breaking gait or failing to take a gait when called for, carrying the head too high or low, taking the wrong lead at the canter, the rider being on the wrong diagonal at the trot, the horse nosing out or flexing behind the vertical, and stumbling.
