= Alberto Larraguibel =

- Breaking the record

Medal record

Equestrian

Representing Chile

Pan American Games
Gold medal – first place	1951 Buenos Aires	Individual jumping
Gold medal – first place	1951 Buenos Aires	Team jumping

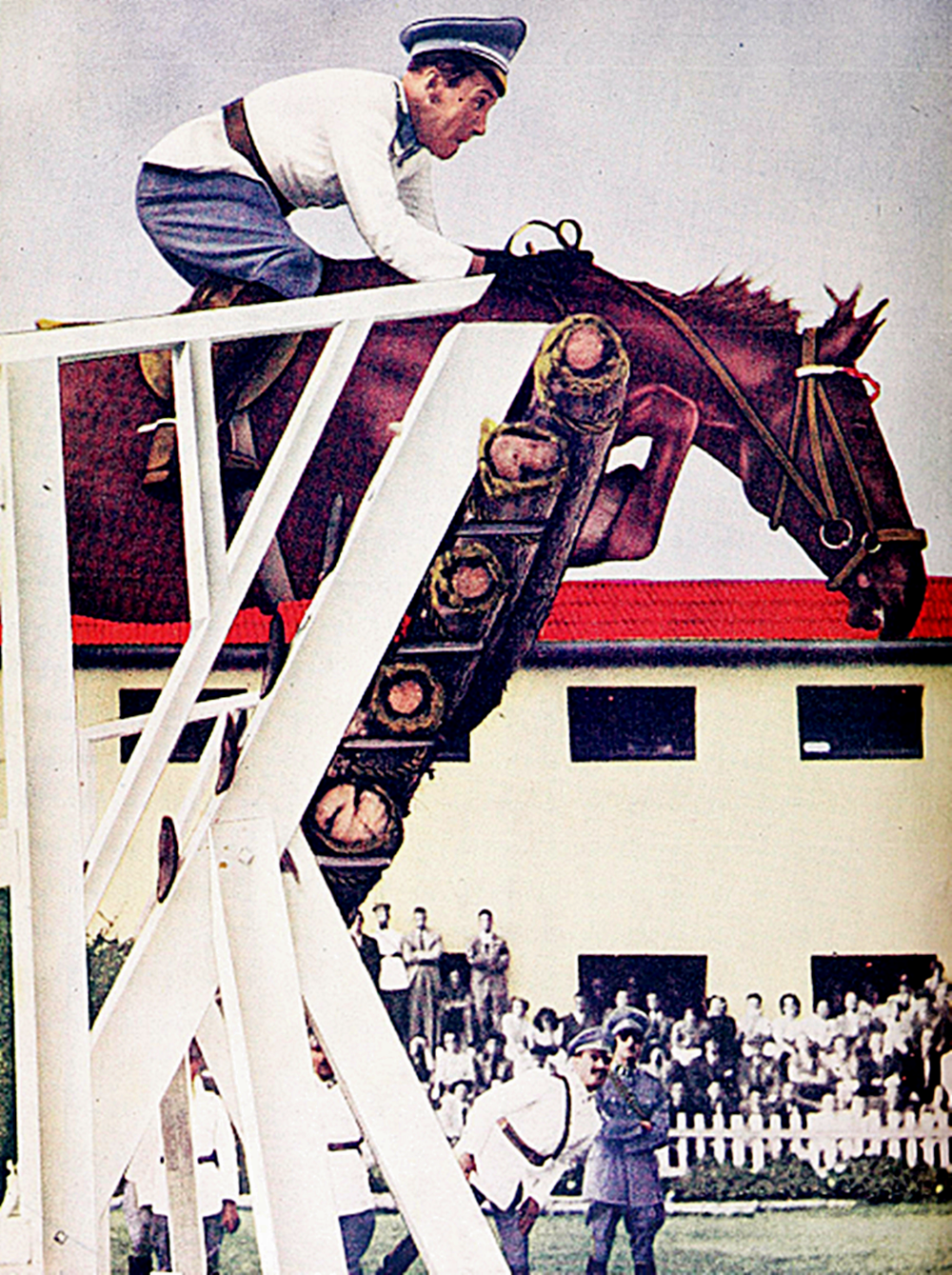
High-Jump 2.47

Capitan Alberto Larraguibel Morales (May 30, 1919 – April 12, 1995) was a Chilean Army officer born in Angol, Chile. He remains as the record holder for highest jump, one of the longest-running unbroken sport records in history – 76 years as of 2025.

== Biography ==
He was born on May13, 1919.

Then-Captain Larraguibel broke the equestrian high jump record at 2.47 metres (8.1 ft), riding Huaso, formerly called "Faithful", at the Official International Event in Viña del Mar, Chile on February 5, 1949. The Committee of Records ratified this record on May 28, 1949, and stated that a height of at least 2.49 metres (8.2 ft) must be cleared to beat it.

In 1951 he was part of the Chilean showjumping team that won gold at the first Pan American Games in Buenos Aires, Argentina.

Larraguibel died in Santiago, Chile at the age of 75.
