= Bramham Horse Trials =

Equestrian event in West Yorkshire, UK

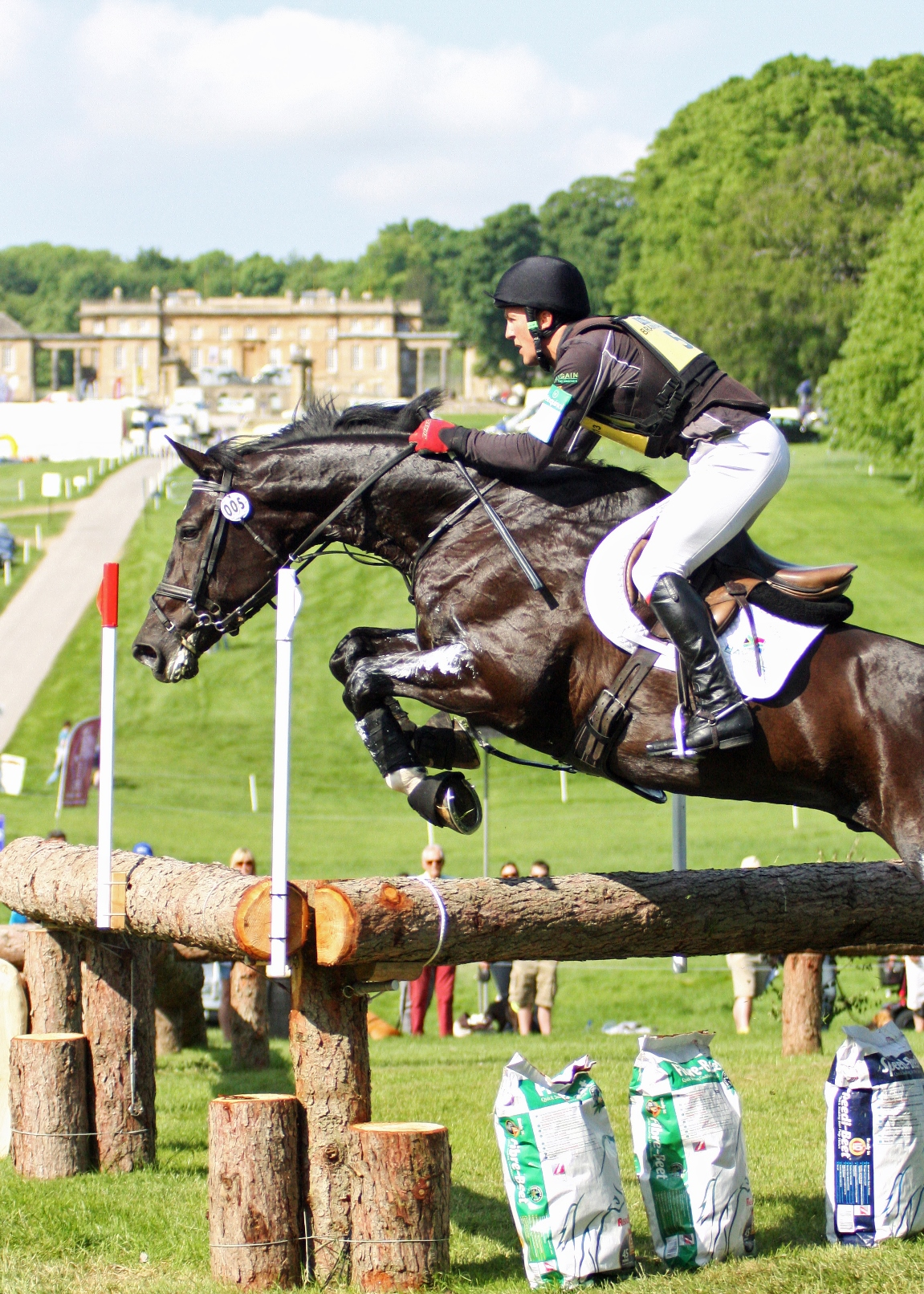
Rider at the 2014 Bramham Horse Trials

Bramham International Horse Trials is one of the Europe's leading three-day events, taking place every June at Bramham Park, near Wetherby in West Yorkshire. The event attracts around 60,000 spectators over four days of competition.

== History ==
The event first ran in 1974 under the direction of George Lane Fox, then owner of Bramham Park and was won by American rider Bruce Davidson from a field of only 25. The horse trials has grown considerably over the years, gaining international status in 1981. There has only been one cancellation in the event's history, which was in 2001 due to the foot and mouth disease epidemic.

The main horse trials regularly attracts in excess of 140 competitors internationally. In 2012 Bramham attracted its largest ever field, and was used by many as a final run for the London 2012 Olympics.

In 2016 it was used as the Olympic Trial for the British Team, which was won by Gemma Tattersall.

== Classes ==
The horse trials is a 3-star level international event and hosts four classes: CCI*** senior; CCI*** British Under 25 Championship; CIC***; and Event Rider Masters CIC***.

A host of other arena classes are held alongside the main event. These include British Show Jumping classes; hunter and young stock classes; Burghley Young Event Horse competition; and a stallion parade.

== Event timetable ==
| Day | Events |
|---|---|
| Thursday | CCI***, CCI*** U25 and CIC*** dressage, hunter and young stock classes |
| Friday | CCI***, CCI*** U25 and CIC*** dressage, Burghley Young Event Horse competition |
| Saturday | CCI***, CCI*** U25 and CIC*** cross country, British Show Jumping classes, Pony Club mounted games and Pony Club show jumping |
| Sunday | CCI***, CCI*** U25 and CIC*** show jumping, British Show Jumping classes, Pony Club mounted games |

== Notable dates ==
| Year | Notable event |
|---|---|
| 1974 | Bramham three day event was born; the inaugural Stirling section winner was Bruce Davidson with Paddy from a field of 25 |
| 1981 | The event gains international status and Mike Etherington-Smith joins as cross country course designer |
| 1985 | After a couple of years of hosting the a Young Rider section, Bramham is awarded the official British Young Rider Championships |
| 1986 | Mary King becomes the first rider to finish first and second with King Cuthbert and Silverstone, respectively |
| 1988 | Jane Wallace (then Thelwall) becomes the first rider to score back-to-back wins with King's Jester; Mike Tucker becomes the new cross country course designer |
| 1989 | Bill Henson begins his 11-year involvement with the horse trials as Event Director |
| 1997 | Captain Mark Phillips takes over as cross country course designer |
| 2000 | Sue Benson adds her name to the esteemed list of cross country course designers |
| 2001 | The event is cancelled for the first time in its history due to the foot and mouth disease epidemic |
| 2002 | The British Young Rider Championship is extended to the British Under 25 Championship, the first of which is won by Zara Phillips on Toytown |
| 2003 | Gail Dale, the event's long-standing secretary retires after a 21-year involvement with the event |
| 2005 | The first year that Bramham runs in the 'short format' without roads, tracks and steeplechase |
| 2010 | Ian Stark becomes takes over as cross country course designer and makes a big change using previously unused features in the Park |
| 2011 | Course builder of the London 2012 Olympics, David Evans joins the team as cross country course builder |
| 2012 | Bramham attracts its largest ever field and is used by many as a final run for the London 2012 Olympics |
| 2013 | The event sees its 40th anniversary, and the first without founder George Lane Fox who died in 2012 |
| 2014 | William Fox-Pitt proves his title as 'King of Bramham' with his eighth win, this time riding Chilli Morning |
| 2017 | Yoshiaki Oiwa becomes the first Japanese rider to win at CCI*** level outside Japan, riding Calle 44 |

== Incidents ==
- 2012: Lead the Way collapsed and died of a heart attack at fence 14.
- 2012: Jagganath collapsed and died after the finish line on cross country of a suspected heart attack.
- 2015: Uwald ridden by Nana Dalton (UK) was euthanized after sustaining an injury to a suspensory ligament while participating in the CCI3* at Bramham.
- 2018: Second Supreme ridden by Chuffy Clark (UK) collapsed and died after stumbling on landing during the cross-country portion of the CCI*** event.
- 2022: Ms Poppins ridden by Allie Knowles (USA) was euthanized after suffering a traumatic injury while on the cross country course.
- 2022: Ventura de la Chaule JRA ridden by Toshiyuki Tanaka (JPN) was euthanized after a rotational fall at fence 7B.
