= Blenheim Horse Trials =

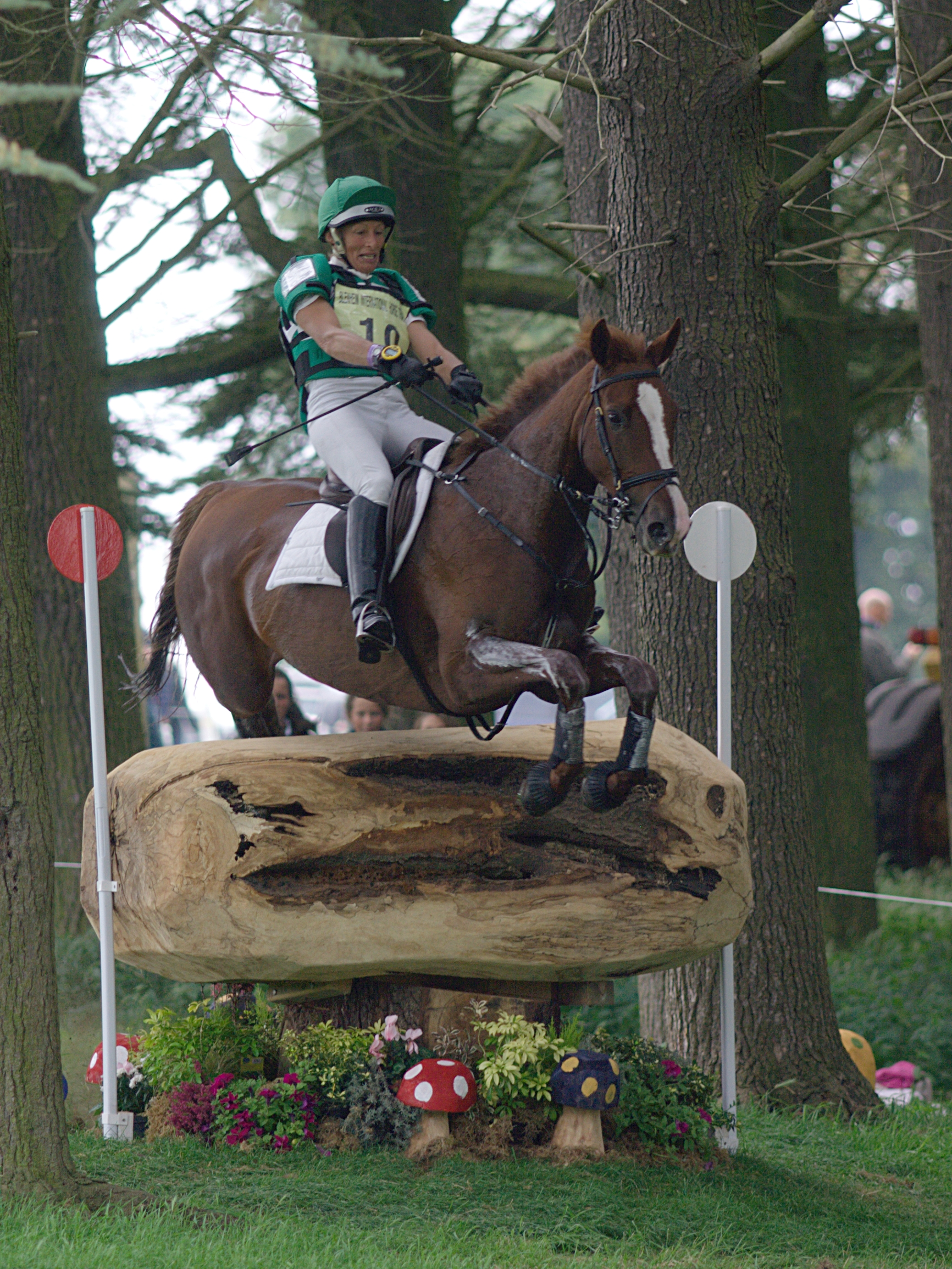
British rider and 1996 Blenheim-winner Mary King at the 2007 Blenheim Horse Trials

The Agria Blenheim Horse Trials is an annual international three-day event held in the park of Blenheim Palace, at Woodstock, England. It is rated CCI*** (the second highest level of eventing).

Blenheim began in 1990, after the three-day event held at Chatsworth was ended. The venue has since become popular both for national and international events, beginning in 1994 with the FEI European Young Rider Championships.

In 2003, Blenheim hosted the Asia-Pacific Championships as a qualifier for the 2004 Athens Olympics. Sixteen nations were represented and several European, World, and Olympic Champions competed. The winner, Pippa Funnell, became the first rider to win three times at the venue. Pippa Funnell won yet again at the 2004 Blenheim Horse Trials, on her stallion, Viceroy.

In 2005, Blenheim hosted the European Eventing Championship.

Blenheim also hosts an 8 and 9 year old CIC*** class, which now incorporates the British 8 and 9 year old National Championship.

Blenheim is considered a world class international equestrian event, featuring, in addition to the showcase, eventing classes, competitions and rides alongside shops, food outlets, bars and other entertainment.

For the first time in 2021, the event was organised by The Jockey Club, the body that runs the Cheltenham Festival, the Epsom Derby and the Aintree Grand National. Since 2023 the Event is organised by Stable Events LTD, who are also the organisers of The Game Fair.

== Past Winners of Blenheim ==
- 1990 Lucinda Murray (now Lucinda Fredericks)/Just Jeremy (GBR)
- 1991 Andrew Nicholson/Park Grove (NZL)
- 1992 Rodney Powell/Limmy’s Comet (GBR)
- 1993 Pippa Nolan (now Mrs Funnell)/Metronome (GBR)
- 1994 Bruce Davidson/Squelch (USA)
  - Young Rider European Champion: Nina Melkonian/Westphalia/GER
  - Young Rider European Championships Team: GBR
- 1995 Pippa Funnell/Bits And Pieces (GBR)
- 1996 Mary King/King Solomon lll (GBR)
- 1997 Paddy Muir/Archie Brown (GBR)
- 1998 Polly Clark (now Polly Stockton)/Westlord (GBR)
- 1999 Franck Bourny/Mallard’s Treat (FRA)
- 2000 William Fox-Pitt/Stunning (also 2nd on Tamarillo (horse)) (GBR)
- 2001 Kimberly Vinoski (now Ms Severson)/Winsome Adante (USA)
- 2002 Lucinda Fredericks/Headley Britannia (AUS)
- 2003 Pippa Funnell/Jurassic Rising (GBR) (also 3rd on Viceroy ll)
  - Asia-Pacific Champion: Phillip Dutton/Nova Top (AUS)
  - Asia-Pacific Winning Team: Australia
- 2004 Pippa Funnell/Viceroy II
- 2005 European Eventing Championships
  - Zara Phillips and Toytown (GBR) Individual Gold
  - Great Britain Team Gold
- 2006 Daisy Dick (Now Daisy Berkeley)/Springbok IV
- 2007 Chris King/The Secret Weapon
- 2008 Cancelled after dressage phase due to poor weather
- 2009 Lucy Wiegersma/Granntevka Prince
- 2010 William Fox-Pitt/Parklane Hawk
- 2011 Piggy French/DHI Topper W
- 2012 William Fox-Pitt/Seacookie
- 2013 William Fox-Pitt/Stormseason
- 2014 Francis Whittington/Easy Target
- 2015 Clark Montgomery (USA) on Mr & Mrs W. Becker's Loughan Glen
- 2016 Bettina Hoy (GER) on her own Seigneur Medicott
- 2017 Kimberly Severson (USA) on The Cross Syndicate's Cooley Cross Border
- 2018 Bella Innes Kerr / Carolyn
- 2019 Piggy French Brookfield Innocent
- 2020 Event did not take place during Covid
- 2021 Yasmin Ingham Banzai Du Loir
- 2022 Malin Hansen-Hotopp / Carlitos Quidditch K
- 2023 Ros Canter / Izilot DHI
- 2024 Tim Price (New Zealand) riding Happy Boy
- 2025 Laura Collett (Great Britain) riding London 52

== Casualties and incidents ==
- 1997: Sam Moore (IRL) died when his horse Dara Rock somersaulted over top of him at fence 19 on the cross-country course. He died on impact.
- 1998: McCadam, ridden by Chris Hall (GBR) collapsed and died while competing on cross-country.
- 2017: An event volunteer posing as a medic was charged with fraud after she allegedly injected drugs into spectators at the event. She was later found guilty and jailed.
- 2022: Equador III, ridden by Thomas Martin (GBR) died after experiencing a rotational fall and injuring a leg.
- 2022:Fanta Boy, ridden by George Goss died after completing the cross country course.
- 2022:Samantha Lissington (NZL) was hospitalized after she and her mount Ricker Ridge Ricochet fell at fence 12B on cross country. The mare was euthanized.
