= Tamarillo (disambiguation) =

Tamarillo is a flowering plant famous for its fruit.

Tamarillo may also refer to:

- Tamarillo (horse) (1992–2015), an Olympic medallist
- Tamarillo, a 2006 album by Olivia Ong
