= Caroline Pratt =

Caroline Pratt (23 June 1962 – 4 September 2004) was a British rider in the equestrian discipline of three-day eventing.

Pratt was born in Lound, Nottinghamshire. She was one of the 14 elite performance riders in the British squad, but was killed in a rotational fall whilst competing at the Burghley Horse Trials Stamford, Lincolnshire, on 4 September 2004, riding her second horse in the competition that day Primitive Streak.

== Competitive success ==
Pratt was placed 7th at the four star Burghley event in 2003 on Primitive Control, and had been long listed for both the Sydney and Athens Olympic squads, although was eventually not selected for either.

== Horses after death ==
On the day of her death, Pratt had already completed the course on first horse Call Again Cavalier, who has gone on to be the Olympic mount of fellow eventer Mary King.

== Memorial trust ==
Following her death, her family set up a memorial trust granting bursaries to aspiring young eventers.
