= Emily King (equestrian) =

British equestrian (born 1996)

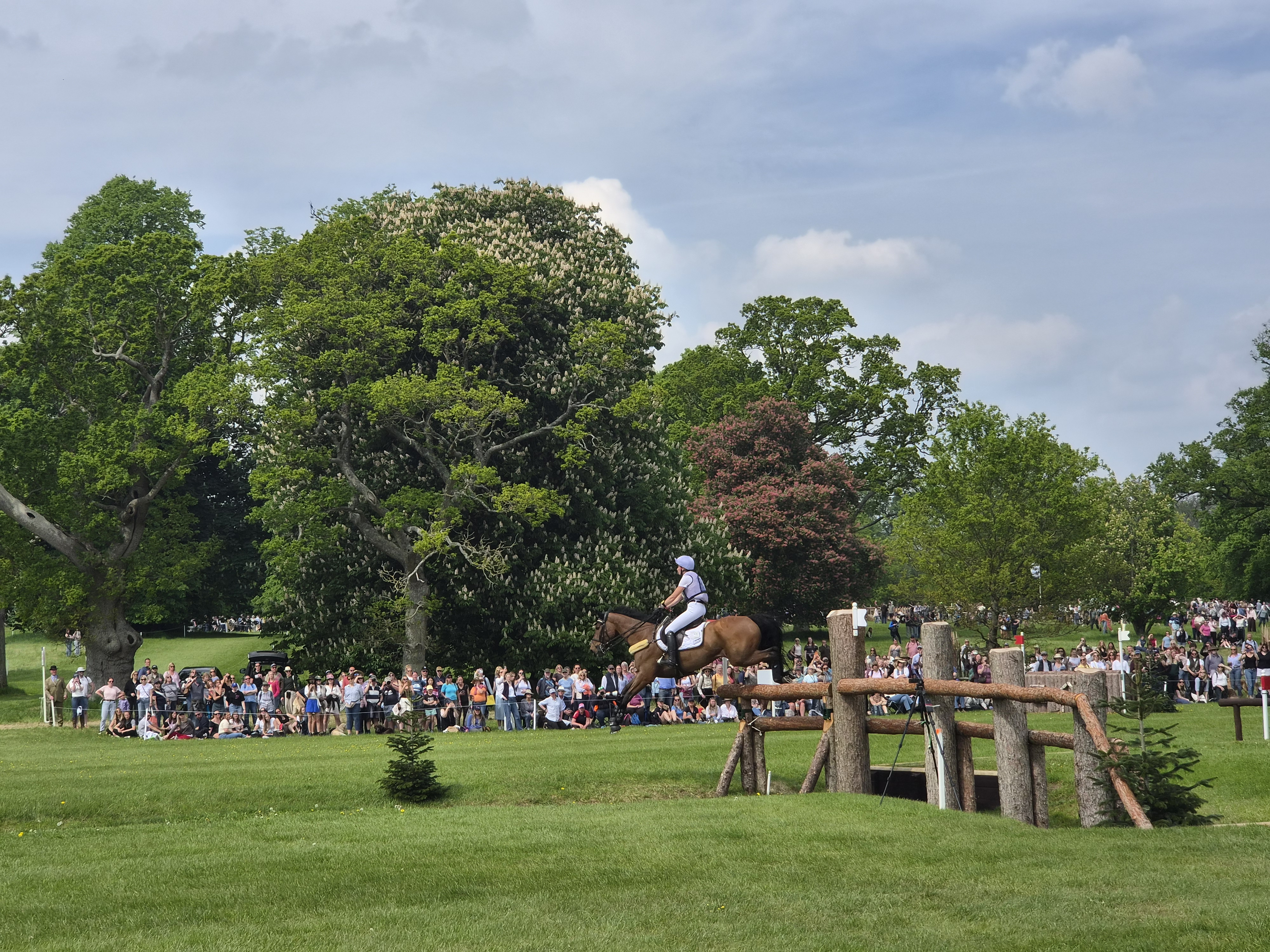
- Badminton Horse Trials 2026

Personal information
- Nationality: British
- Born: 26 January 1996 (age 30)
- Education: Queens College, Taunton
- Relative: Mary King (mother)

Sport
- Country: Great Britain
- Sport: Equestrian
- Event: Eventing

Emily King (born 26 January 1996) is a British Equestrian who competes in Eventing. She is the daughter of Mary King.

== Early life ==
The daughter of David and Mary King, she has a brother called Freddie. Her mother was 5½ months pregnant with Emily when she won a team gold and individual bronze at the European Championships in 1995.

She was riding ponies from a young age and had her own pony by the age of 11 years-old. She was educated at Queen’s College, Taunton. She was diagnosed with myalgic encephalomyelitis in childhood. As a teenager she suffered injuries from sports and falls from riding, including a broken pelvis, broken ribs, broken kneecap, and broken fingers and had a disorder in her hip that would cause her iliotibial band to tear.

== Career ==
She represented Team GB when she was 15 years-old at the 2011 Junior European Championships. In 2012, she won her first individual European medal at the Junior European eventing championships in Strzegom where she won silver with her horse Mr Hiho. In 2013, she was named the National U21 (Under 21) Champion. In 2015, she won team gold in the Young Rider European championships in Strzegom and came second in the seven-year-old championships at Osberton with her horse Dargun.

She made her five-star debut at Pau, France, in 2015 on Brookleigh. She made her debut at the Badminton Horse Trials in 2016 on Brookleigh. In 2018, she used Crowdfund to help her raise £40,000 to purchase her horse Langford Take the Biscuit, known as "Hobby". On Dargun in 2018 she won the U25 National Championships at Bramham and came 4th in the British Open.

In 2023, she made her debut at the Burghley Horse Trials on Valmy Biats, and they also rode together at the Badminton Horse Trials. That year, they won the Eventing Spring Carnival at Thoresby Park together.

In March 2024, she and Valmy Biats became the first ever back-to-back winners of the Grantham Cup. At the 2024 Badminton Horse Trials she was placed fifth after the dressage section. In May 2024, she and Valmy Biats were one of the British pairings nominated for entry for the Paris 2024 Olympic Games. In July 2024, riding Valmy Biats she was part of the victorious British team at the SAP-Cup at CHIO Aachen.

== Personal life ==
Originally from Devon, in 2019 she moved north to be based near Holywell in Flintshire where she runs a yard with partner Sam Ecroyd.
