= William Fox-Pitt =

British equestrian

William Fox-Pitt MBE
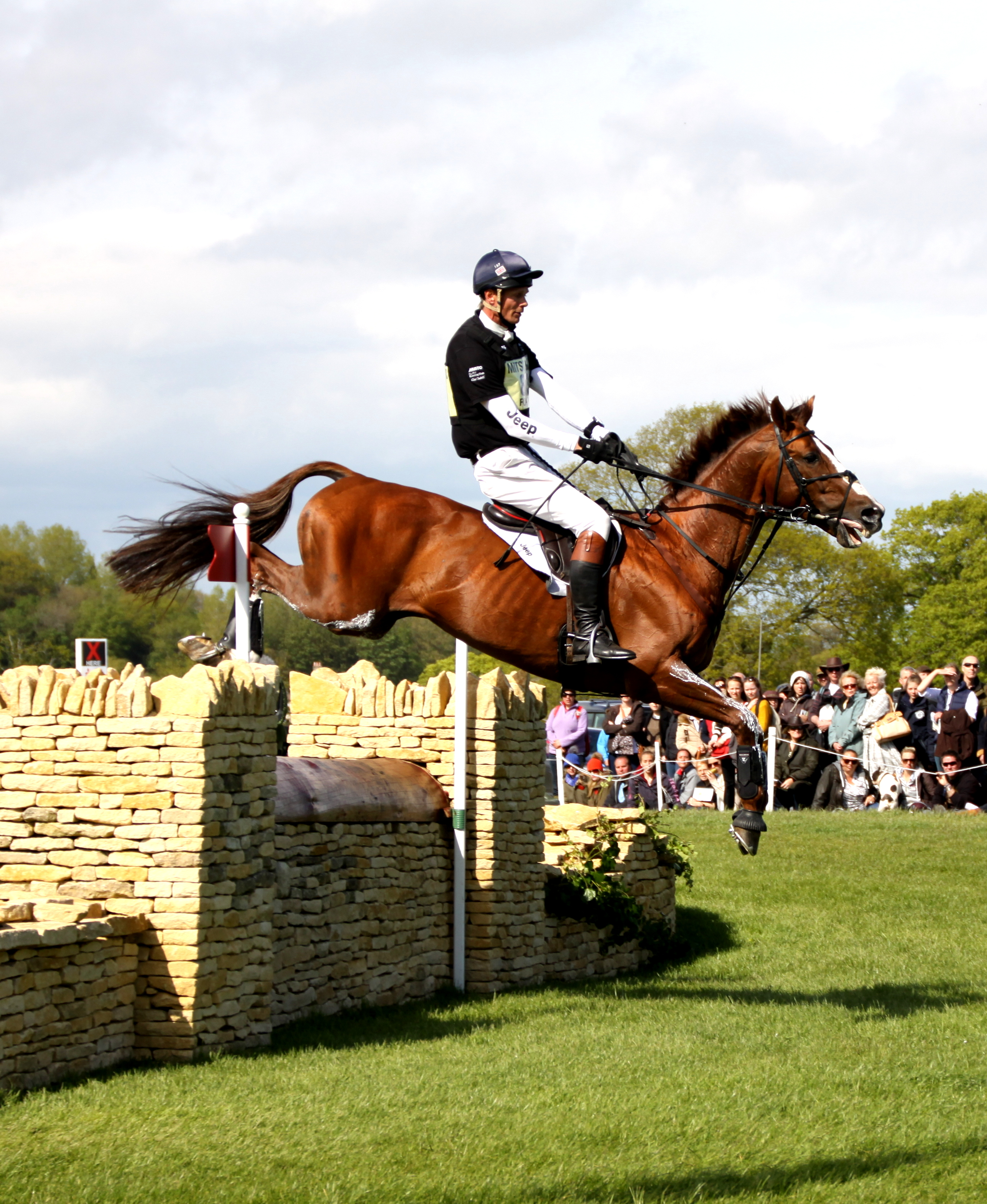
- Fox-Pitt and Chilli Morning, Badminton Horse Trials, 2015

Personal information
- Full name: William Speed Lane Fox-Pitt
- Nationality: Great Britain
- Discipline: Eventing
- Born: 2 January 1969 (age 57); Hampstead, London, England
Medal record
Representing Great Britain
Equestrian
Olympic Games
Silver medal – second place	2004 Athens	Team eventing
Silver medal – second place	2012 London	Team eventing
Bronze medal – third place	2008 Beijing	Team eventing
World Championships
Gold medal – first place	2010 Kentucky	Team eventing
Silver medal – second place	2006 Aachen	Team eventing
Silver medal – second place	2010 Kentucky	Individual eventing
Silver medal – second place	2014 Normandy	Team eventing
Bronze medal – third place	2002 Jerez	Team eventing
Bronze medal – third place	2014 Normandy	Individual eventing
European Championships
Gold medal – first place	1995 Pratoni del Vivaro	Team eventing
Gold medal – first place	1997 Burghley	Team eventing
Gold medal – first place	2001 Pau	Team eventing
Gold medal – first place	2003 Punchestown	Team eventing
Gold medal – first place	2005 Blenheim	Team eventing
Gold medal – first place	2009 Fontainbleau	Team eventing
Silver medal – second place	1997 Burghley	Individual eventing
Silver medal – second place	2005 Blenheim	Individual eventing
Silver medal – second place	2015 Blair Castle	Team eventing
Bronze medal – third place	2011 Luhmuhlen	Team eventing
Bronze medal – third place	2013 Malmö	Individual Eventing

William Speed Lane Fox-Pitt MBE (born 2 January 1969) is an English equestrian who competes in eventing. His career highlights include winning three Olympic medals in the team event, with silver in 2004 and 2012, and bronze in 2008. At the World Equestrian Games, he won team gold and individual silver in 2010, and team silver and individual bronze in 2014. He also won World team medals in 2002 and 2006. At the European Championships, he has won six team gold medals, as well as Individual silver in 1997 and 2005, and Individual bronze in 2013. He is the recordman CCI*****'s winner with 14 grand slam titles. In 2011, he became the first rider to win five different five-star events, having won the Burghley Horse Trials a record six times (1994, 2002, 2005, 2007, 2008, and 2011), Rolex Kentucky three times (2010, 2012, 2014), Stars of Pau twice (2011, 2013), the Badminton Horse Trials twice (2004, 2015), and the Luhmühlen Horse Trials once (2008). A serious fall in 2015 left him in a coma for two weeks, but he came back to make the British eventing team and attend the 2016 Summer Olympics. He was appointed Member of the Order of the British Empire (MBE) in the 2018 Birthday Honours.

== Early life and education ==
Fox-Pitt was born in Hampstead, the eldest son of William Oliver Lane Fox-Pitt (1932–2012, known as Oliver) and Marietta Speed. His father competed in many sports, and in addition had a career in the city, founding an investment bank now known as Fox-Pitt Kelton Cochran Caronia Waller. Oliver and Marietta were both equestrian competitors, riding at Badminton and Burghley, and his siblings have been very successful as well. His paternal grandfather was Major-General "Billy" Fox-Pitt DSO MC a Dorset landowner who served in both World Wars and was a founding officer of the Welsh Guards.

Fox-Pitt was educated at Wellesley House School in Kent, Eton College and the Goldsmiths, University of London.

Fox-Pitt began riding at age four. At 13, he stopped riding because he feared he would be bullied by his peers.

He is married to former eventer and current ITV Racing presenter Alice Plunkett. They have four children.

== Sports career ==
He is the recordman of CCI*****'s winner with 14 titles. He is also the only rider to have won 5 out of the six CCI*****'s having won Burghley (1994, 2002, 2005, 2007, 2008, 2011), Badminton (2004 & 2015), Pau (2011, 2013), Kentucky (2010, 2012, 2014) and Luhmuhlen (2008). He holds the record for the most wins (six) at the Burghley Horse Trials; William's victories coming in 1994, 2002, 2005, 2007, 2008 and 2011. Additional major wins have been at the Badminton Horse Trials in 2004 and again in 2015, at Gatcombe Park in 1995, 2000, 2003 and 2005. Team golds in European Championships in 1995, 1997, 2001, 2003, 2005, 2009. He took individual silver at the 1997 Europeans, team bronze at the 2002 and 2011 Europeans, individual silver at the 2005 Europeans, team silver at the 2006 Aachen World Equestrian Games, team silver at the 2021 Nations Cup in Boekelo, team gold at the 2010 World Equestrian Games, individual bronze at the 2013 Europeans, team silver and individual bronze at the 2014 World Equestrian Games, and team silver at the 2015 Europeans. He also represented Great Britain at the (1996 Summer Olympics/Atlanta), (2004 Summer Olympics/Athens), (2008 Summer Olympics/Beijing), (2012 Summer Olympics/London) and (2016 Summer Olympics/Rio), winning team silver in Athens, team bronze in Beijing and team silver in London. In 2006 he was ranked the leading rider in Britain for the sixth year running and 2nd in the world, and as of 2014 he was ranked 1st in the world.

William is married to Channel 4 Racing presenter Alice Plunkett. They have two sons; Oliver (born in August 2005) and Thomas (born 15 November 2006), and two daughters; Chloe (born October 2012) and Emily (born September 2014). William is a regular columnist in the weekly equestrian magazine, Horse & Hound.

In the eventing world, one of his best known partnerships is with the horse Tamarillo.

In October 2015, a fall at a competition in France left him in a coma for two weeks. After regaining consciousness, he had initial trouble with blindness and then double vision, but was ultimately able to earn a spot on the British team for the 2016 Olympics and returned to international competition with the stallion Chilli Morning. He was the only remaining member of the 2012 team who won silver in London 2012.

On 12 May 2024, 35 years after he first competed at Badminton Horse Trials, William announced that that year's Badminton would be his last.

== Career highlights ==
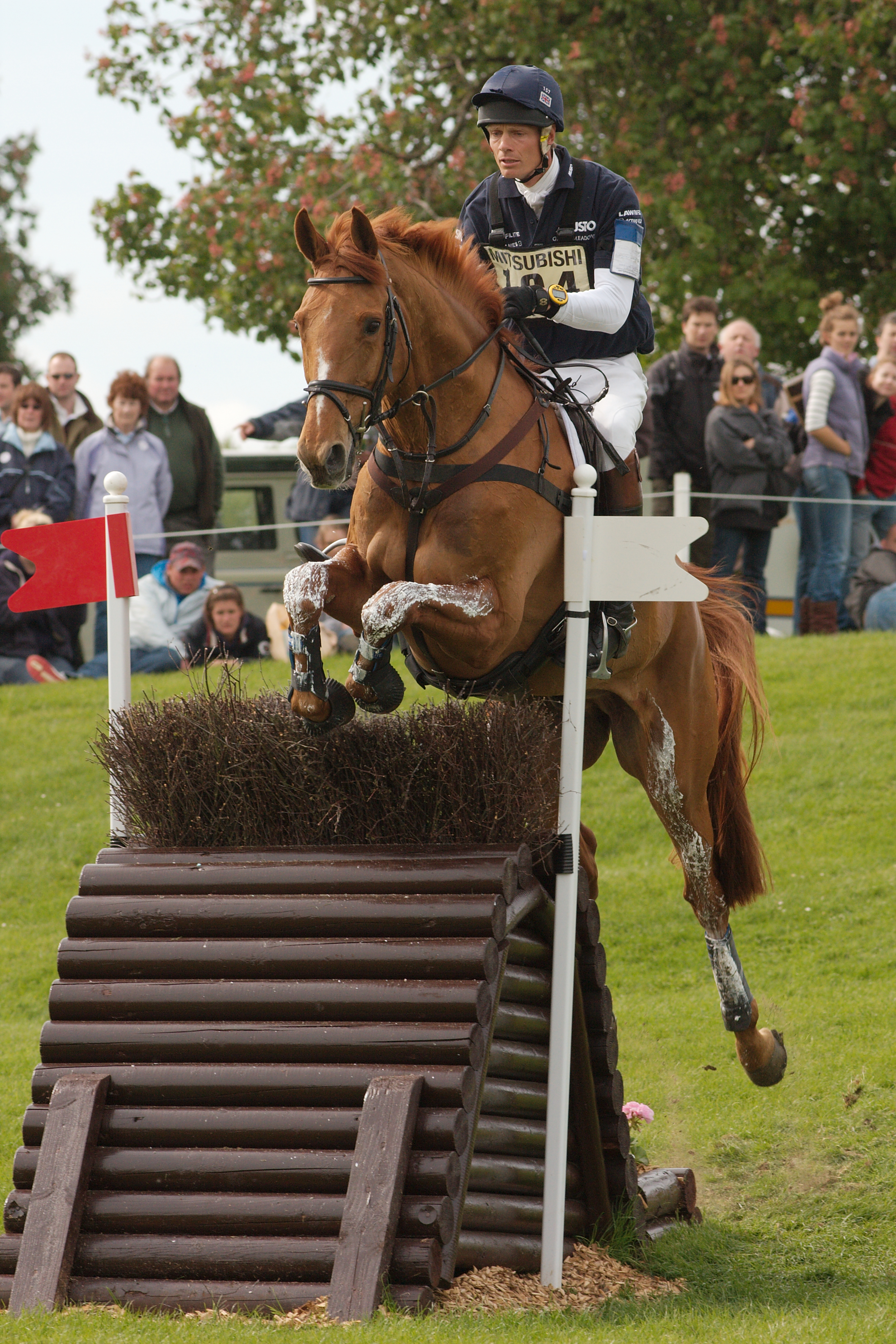
William Fox-Pitt and Idalgo at the Hillside during the cross-country phase of Badminton Horse Trials 2009.

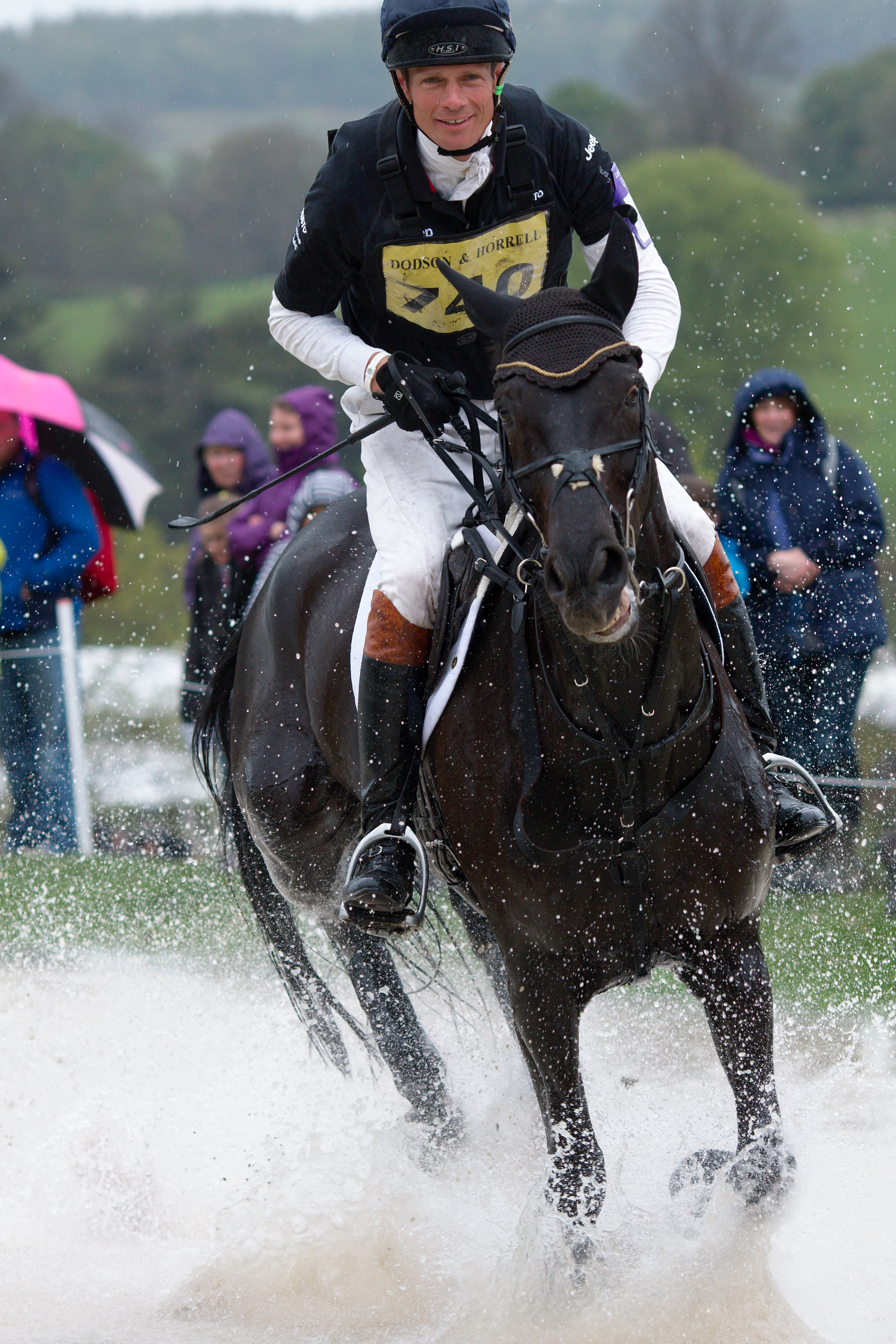
William Fox Pitt and Before Time at the Ice Pond during the cross-country phase of the CIC*** (Section K) competition at Chatsworth International Horse Trials 2013.

2024

- 13th Badminton Horse Trials (Grafennacht)

2023

- 2nd Maryland CCI***** (Grafennacht)
- 3rd Aston le Walls CCI*** (Duke Legacy)

2022

- 7th Aachen CCI**** (Little Fire)

2021

- 1st Houghton CIC**** (Little Fire)
- 2nd Boekelo CCI**** (Grafennacht)
- Team Silver at the Nations Cup in Boekelo (Grafennacht)
- 2nd Osberton YH Champs CCI* (Cayiano)

2020

- 1st Cornbury CCI** (Centurian Bay)

2019

- 1st Tattersalls Horse Trials CCI*** (Georgisaurous)
- 2nd Festival of British Eventing Novice Championships (Grafennacht)

2018

- 2nd Blenheim Palace Horse Trials CCI*** (Oratorio II)
- 2nd Tattersalls Horse Trials CCI*** (Little Fire)

2017

- 1st Barbury Horse Trials CIC*** (Clifton Signature)

2016

- 12th Individual at the Summer Olympics in Rio (Chilli Morning)

2015

- Team Silver at the European Championships in Scotland (Bay My Hero)
- 1st Badminton Horse Trials CCI**** (Chilli Morning)
- 4th Rolex Kentucky Three Day CCI**** (Bay My Hero)

2014

- FEI World number 1 eventing rider
- Individual Bronze and Team Silver at the World Equestrian Games in France (Chilli Morning)
- 1st Rolex Kentucky Three Day CCI**** (Bay My Hero)
- 9th Rolex Kentucky Three Day CCI**** (Seacookie)

2013

- 1st Stars of Pau CCI **** (Seacookie)
- 3rd Stars of Pau CCI **** (Cool Mountain)
- Individual Bronze at the European Championship in Sweden (Chilli Morning)
- 3rd Luhmühlen Horse Trials CCI **** (Neuf des Coeurs)
- 4th Luhmühlen Horse Trials CCI **** (Lionheart)
- 1st Bramham Horse Trials CCI***(Chilli Morning)
- 5th Badminton Horse Trials CCI **** (Parklane Hawk)
- 2nd Rolex Kentucky Three Day CCI **** (Seacookie)

2012

- FEI World number 1 eventing rider
- 1st Bramham Horse Trials CCI***(Chilli Morning)
- 1st Rolex Kentucky Three Day CCI **** (Parklane Hawk)
- Team Silver at the Summer Olympics in London (Lionheart)

2011

- Team Bronze at the European Championships in Luhmuhlen (Cool Mountain)
- 1st Burghley Horse Trials CCI **** (Parklane Hawk)
- 1st Stars of Pau CCI **** (Oslo)

2010

- FEI World number 1 eventing rider
- 1st Rolex Kentucky Three Day CCI **** (Cool Mountain)
- Team Gold and Individual Silver at FEI World Equestrian Games Kentucky (Cool Mountain)

2009

- Team Gold at the European Championships in France (Idalgo)

2008

- FEI World number 1 eventing rider
- 1st Burghley Horse Trials CCI **** (Tamarillo)
- 2nd Burghley Horse Trials CCI **** (Ballincoola)
- 3rd Badminton Horse Trials CCI **** (Ballincoola)
- 1st Bramham Horse Trials CCI*** (Navigator)
- 1st Luhmühlen Horse Trials CCI **** (Macchiato)
- Team Bronze at the Summer Olympics in Beijing

2007

- 1st Bramham Horse Trials CCI*** (Macchiato)
- 1st Burghley Horse Trials CCI **** (Parkmore Ed)
- 1st Blair CCI*** (Macchiato)
- 5th Burghley Horse Trials CCI **** (Ballincoola)

2006

- 9th Badminton Horse Trials CCI **** (Ballincoola)
- 11th Luhmühlen Horse Trials CCI **** (Birthday Night)
- 1st Hartpary CCI*** (Moon Man)
- 15th Aachen WEG **** (Tamarillo)
- 3rd Blenheim Horse Trials CCI*** (Parkmore Ed)
- 6th Burghley Horse Trials CCI **** (Ballincoola)

2005

- 1st Burghley Horse Trials CCI **** (Ballincoola)
- 1st Boekelo Horse Trials CCI*** (Mr. Dumbledore)
- 2nd Badminton Horse Trials CCI **** (Tamarillo)
- 1st Bramham Horse Trials CCI*** (Mr. Dumbledore)
- 2nd Bramham Horse Trials CCI*** (Idalgo)
- 1st Gatcombe British Open (Moon Man)
- Team gold and individual silver at the European Championships (Tamarillo)
- Winner of the British Eventing Premier League

2004

- 1st Badminton Horse Trials CCI **** (Tamarillo)
- 4th Rolex Kentucky Three Day CCI **** (Ballincoola)
- 7th Fontainebleau (Stunning)
- Team silver at the Athens Olympics (Tamarillo)

2003

- 5th Le Lion d’Angers (Idalgo)
- 8th Le Lion d’Angers (Igor de Cluis)
- 1st Boekelo (Tom Cruise)
- Team gold and 8th individual European Championships, Punchestown, Ireland (Moon Man)
- 1st CIC World Cup Qualifier, Thirlestane Castle (Stunning)
- 1st British Open Championships, Gatcombe Park (Stunning)
- 2nd British Open Championships, Gatcombe Park (Moon Man)
- 1st British Intermediate Championships, Gatcombe Park (Tom Cruise II)
- 1st Luhmühlen Horse Trials CIC *** (Tom Cruise II)
- 1st Bramham Horse Trials CCI *** (Wallow)
- 2nd Bramham Horse Trials CCI *** (Ballincoola)
- 7th Saumur (Coastal Ties)
- 1st Chatsworth CIC World Cup Qualifier (Stunning)
- 3rd Rolex Kentucky Three Day CCI **** (Moon Man)

2002

- FEI World number 1 eventing rider
- Team bronze World Equestrian Games, Jerez, Spain (Tamarillo)
- 1st Burghley Horse Trials CCI **** (Highland Lad)
- 7th Burghley Horse Trials CCI **** (Moon Man)
- 4th Boekelo (Stunning)
- 3rd British Open Championships, Gatcombe Park (Moon Man)
- 4th British Open Championships, Gatcombe Park (Stunning)
- 4th Rolex Kentucky Three Day CCI **** (Stunning)
- 2nd Badminton Horse Trials CCI **** (Tamarillo)
- 6th Bramham Horse Trials CCI *** (Highland Lad)
- 8th Bramham Horse Trials CCI *** (Just A Sovereign)

2001

- 5th and Team gold European Champs, Pau, France (Stunning)
- 4th Bonn Roderberg CCIO (Barclay Square)
- 4th Saumur (Stunning)
- 9th Burghley Horse Trials CCI **** (Springleaze Macaroo)

2000

- 1st British Open Champs, Gatcombe Park (Moon Man)
- 1st Blenheim Horse Trials CCI *** (Stunning)
- 2nd Blenheim Horse Trials CCI *** (Tamarillo)

1999

- 2nd Achselschwang (Moon Man)
- 7th Bramham Horse Trials CCI *** (Moon Man)

1997

- Individual silver and Team gold European Open Championships, Burghley (Cosmopolitan II)
- 2nd Scottish Open Championships, Thirlestane Castle (Cosmopolitan II)
- 3rd Badminton Horse Trials CCI **** (Cosmopolitan II)

1996

- 5th Olympic Games Team Competition, Atlanta, USA (Cosmopolitan II)
- 6th Bramham Horse Trials CCI *** (Lismore Lord Charles)
- 5th Boekelo (Mostly Mischief)

1995

- 6th and Team gold European Open Championships, Pratoni del Vivaro, Italy (Cosmopolitan II)
- 1st Bramham Horse Trials CCI *** (Cosmopolitan II)
- 1st British Open Championships, Gatcombe Park (Chaka)
- 6th Blenheim Horse Trials CCI *** (Loch Alan)
- 5th Boekelo (Faerie Diadem)

1994

- 1st Burghley Horse Trials CCI **** (Chaka)
- 2nd Scottish Open Championships, Thirlestane Castle (Chaka)
- 7th Punchestown (Thomastown)
- 2nd British Open Championships, Gatcombe Park (Chaka)

1993

- 7th Badminton Horse Trials CCI **** (Chaka)

1990

- 4th and Team gold Young Rider European Championships (Steadfast)
- 3rd Young Rider National Championships (Faerie Sovereign)

1989

- Individual bronze and Team silver Young Rider European Championships, Achselschwang, Germany

1988

- 4th and Team gold Young Rider European Championships, Zonhoven, Belgium (Steadfast)

1987

- Individual silver Junior European Championships, Pratoni del Vivaro, Italy (Steadfast)
- 5th Junior National Championships

1985

- 8th Junior National Championships 1985

== Partial CCI5* results ==
Results
Event	Kentucky (USA) late April	Badminton (UK) early May	Luhmühlen (Germany) June	Burghley (UK) early September	Maryland (USA) mid-October	Pau (France) late October	Adelaide (Australia) early November
1993		7th (Chaka)			Event first held in 2021		
1994				(gold) (Chaka)	Event first held in 2021		
1997		(bronze) (Cosmopolitan II)			Event first held in 2021		
2001				9th (Springleaze Macaroo)	Event first held in 2021		
2002	4th (Stunning)	(silver) (Tamarillo)		(gold) (Highland Lad)7th (Moon Man)	Event first held in 2021		
2003	(bronze) (Moon Man)	22nd (Highland Lad)		28th (Ballin Coola)	Event first held in 2021		
2004	4th (Ballin Coola)11th (Coastal Ties)	(gold) (Tamarillo)		11th (Ballin Coola)	Event first held in 2021		
2005		(silver) (Tamarillo)RET (Ballin Coola)		(gold) (Ballin Coola)	Event first held in 2021		
2006	RET (Mr Dumbledore) EL (Coup De Coeur)	9th (Ballin Coola) WD (Tamarillo)	11th (Birthday Night)	6th (Ballin Coola) 19th (Idalgo Du Donjon)	Event first held in 2021		
2007				(gold) (Parkmore Ed)5th (Ballin Coola)	Event first held in 2021		
2008		(bronze) (Ballin Coola)18th (Tamarillo)	(gold) (Macchiato)	(gold) (Tamarillo) (silver) (Ballin Coola)	Event first held in 2021	11th (Idalgo Du Donjon)	
2009	6th (Seacookie TSF)23rd (Navigator)	(silver) (Idalgo Du Donjon)5th (Macchiato)		8th (Seacookie TSF)RET (Macchiato)	Event first held in 2021	17th (Macchiato)	
2010	(gold) (Cool Mountain)	34th (Macchiato) WD (Seacookie TSF)		(silver) (Seacookie TSF)6th (Macchiato)	Event first held in 2021	(silver) (Navigator)	
2011	4th (Neuf Des Coeurs)	13th (Cool Mountain) 15th (Navigator)	9th (Macchiato)	(gold) (Parklane Hawk) 18th (Neuf Des Coeurs)	Event first held in 2021	(gold) (Oslo) (bronze) (Lionheart) 25th (Macchiato)	
2012	(gold) (Parklane Hawk)			(bronze) (Parklane Hawk) RET (Seacookie TSF)	Event first held in 2021	4th (Bay My Hero)5th (Chilli Morning)	
2013	(silver) (Seacookie TSF) RET (Chilli Morning)	5th (Parklane Hawk)52rd (Oslo)	(bronze) (Neuf Des Coeurs) 4th (Lionheart)	(bronze) (Parklane Hawk) RET (Neuf Des Coeurs)	Event first held in 2021	(gold) (Seacookie TSF) (bronze) (Cool Mountain) 15th (Neuf Des Coeurs)	
2014	(gold) (Bay My Hero) 9th (Seacookie TSF)	EL (Parklane Hawk) WD (Cool Mountain)	WD (Cool Mountain)	4th (Bay My Hero)	Event first held in 2021	WD (Parklane Hawk) RET (Seacookie TSF)	
2015	4th (Bay My Hero)	(gold) (Chilli Morning)		10th (Fernhill Pimms)	Event first held in 2021		
2016-17	Did Not Participate						
2018		RET (Fernhill Pimms)			Event first held in 2021	EL (Little Fire)	
2019		8th (Little Fire) 12th (Oratorio)			Event first held in 2021		
2020	Cancelled due to COVID-19	Cancelled due to COVID-19	Cancelled due to COVID-19	Cancelled due to COVID-19	Event first held in 2021		Cancelled due to COVID-19
2021	EL (Oratorio)	Cancelled due to COVID-19		Cancelled due to COVID-19 ("replaced" by Bicton 5*: RET (Oratorio II))		22nd (Little Fire) 27th (Oratorio)	Cancelled due to COVID-19
2022		13th (Little Fire) 14th (Oratorio)		RET (Oratorio)			
2023		14th (Grafennacht)			(silver) (Grafennacht)		
EL = Eliminated; RET = Retired; WD = Withdrew

== International Championship results ==
Results
Year	Event	Horse	Placing	Notes
1987	European Junior Championships	Steadfast	2nd place, silver medalist(s)	Individual
1989	European Young Rider Championships	Steadfast	2nd place, silver medalist(s)	Team
1989	European Young Rider Championships	Steadfast	4th	Individual
1990	European Young Rider Championships	Steadfast	1st place, gold medalist(s)	Team
1990	European Young Rider Championships	Steadfast	4th	Individual
1995	European Championships	Cosmopolitan II	1st place, gold medalist(s)	Team
1995	European Championships	Cosmopolitan II	5th	Individual
1996	Olympic Games	Cosmopolitan II	5th	Team
1997	European Championships	Cosmopolitan II	1st place, gold medalist(s)	Team
1997	European Championships	Cosmopolitan II	2nd place, silver medalist(s)	Individual
2001	European Championships	Stunning	1st place, gold medalist(s)	Team
2001	European Championships	Stunning	6th	Individual
2002	World Equestrian Games	Tamarillo	3rd place, bronze medalist(s)	Team
2002	World Equestrian Games	Tamarillo	14th	Individual
2003	European Championships	Moon Man	1st place, gold medalist(s)	Team
2003	European Championships	Moon Man	8th	Individual
2004	Olympic Games	Tamarillo	2nd place, silver medalist(s)	Team
2004	Olympic Games	Tamarillo	RET	Individual
2004	World Young Horse Championships	Gidran Sohaj	18th	CCI**
2004	World Young Horse Championships	Jass de la Fosse	22nd	CCI**
2005	World Cup Final	Ballin Coola	4th	
2005	European Championships	Tamarillo	1st place, gold medalist(s)	Team
2005	European Championships	Tamarillo	2nd place, silver medalist(s)	Individual
2006	World Equestrian Games	Tamarillo	2nd place, silver medalist(s)	Team
2006	World Equestrian Games	Tamarillo	15th	Individual
2006	World Young Horse Championships	Chuckelberry	WD	CCI**
2008	World Cup Final	Kaleidoscope	RET	
2008	Olympic Games	Parkmore ED	3rd place, bronze medalist(s)	Team
2008	Olympic Games	Parkmore ED	12th	Individual
2008	World Young Horse Championships	Oslo	1st place, gold medalist(s)	CCI*
2008	World Young Horse Championships	Neuf des Coeurs	12th	CCI**
2009	European Championships	Idalgo du Donjon	1st place, gold medalist(s)	Team
2009	European Championships	Idalgo du Donjon	4th	Individual
2009	World Young Horse Championships	Oslo	2nd place, silver medalist(s)	CCI**
2010	World Equestrian Games	Cool Mountain	1st place, gold medalist(s)	Team
2010	World Equestrian Games	Cool Mountain	2nd place, silver medalist(s)	Individual
2010	World Young Horse Championships	Fernhill Highlight	4th	CCI**
2010	World Young Horse Championships	Bay My Hero	6th	CCI**
2011	European Championships	Cool Mountain	3rd place, bronze medalist(s)	Team
2011	European Championships	Cool Mountain	7th	Individual
2012	Olympic Games	Lionheart	2nd place, silver medalist(s)	Team
2012	Olympic Games	Lionheart	27th	Individual
2013	European Championships	Chilli Morning	6th	Team
2013	European Championships	Chilli Morning	3rd place, bronze medalist(s)	Individual
2013	World Young Horse Championships	Top Baits	WD	CCI*
2013	World Young Horse Championships	Luxury F H	WD	CCI**
2013	World Young Horse Championships	Henton For Fun	WD	CCI**
2014	World Equestrian Games	Chilli Morning	2nd place, silver medalist(s)	Team
2014	World Equestrian Games	Chilli Morning	3rd place, bronze medalist(s)	Individual
2015	European Championships	Bay My Hero	2nd place, silver medalist(s)	Team
2015	European Championships	Bay My Hero	RET	Individual
2015	World Young Horse Championships	Reinstated	EL	CCI**
2015	World Young Horse Championships	The Soapdodger	WD	CCI**
2016	Olympic Games	Chilli Morning	5th	Team
2016	Olympic Games	Chilli Morning	12th	Individual
2019	World Young Horse Championships	Grafennacht	4th	CCI***
2021	FEI Nations Cup	Grafennacht	2nd	CCI****
EL = Eliminated; RET = Retired; WD = Withdrew

== Gallery ==
William Fox-Pitt on Idalgo clears the Cottesmore Leap at Burghley Horse Trials, 2006

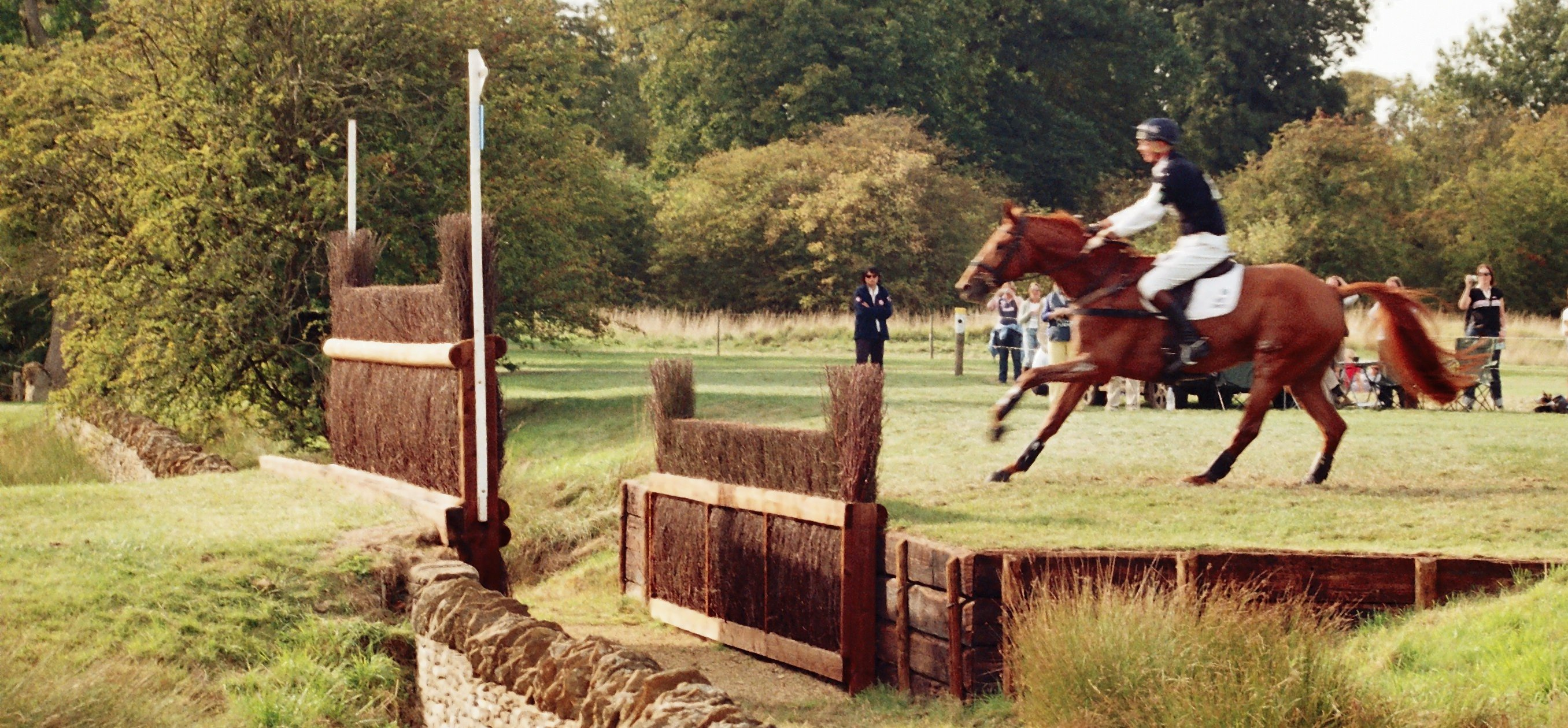

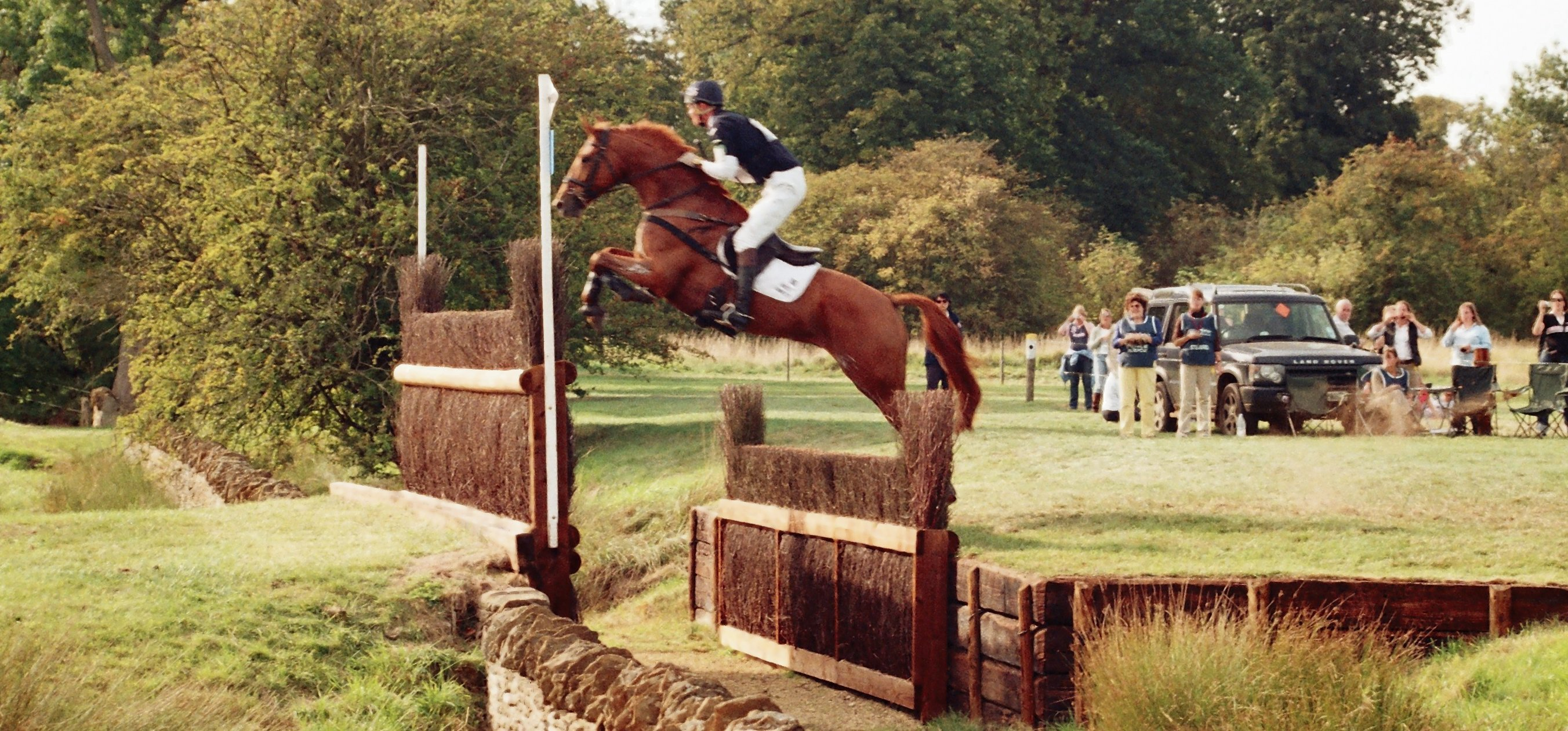

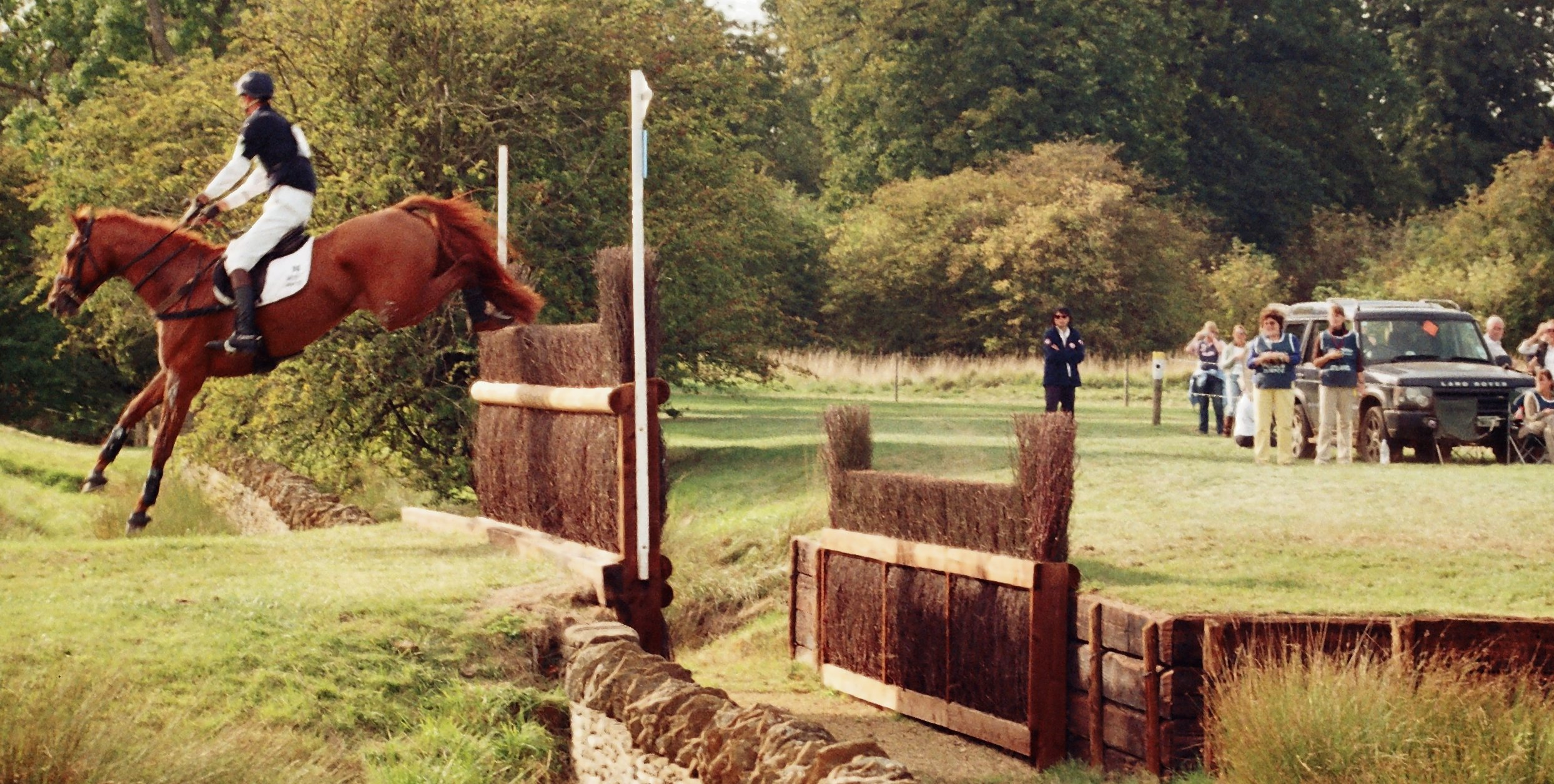
