= Tamarillo (horse) =

Horse

- Breed: [Anglo-Arabian]
- Sire: Tarnik (Part bred Arabian)
- Grandsire: Walezjusz (Anglo-Arabian x Thoroughbred)
- Dam: Mellita (Anglo Arabian)
- Maternal grandsire: Master Spiritus (Thoroughbred)
- Sex: Gelding
- Foaled: 1992
- Died: 2015
- Colour: Bay
- Breeder: The Hon. Finn and Mary Guinness
- Owner: The Hon. Mrs Mary Guinness

Major wins
- Badminton CCI**** 2004, Burghley CCI**** 2008

Tamarillo was an Anglo-Arab gelding that excelled in the sport of eventing under rider William Fox-Pitt.

Foaled in 1992 at Biddesden Stud Tamarillo was shown successfully as a young horse becoming Part Bred Champion at the annual National Arabian Horse Show in Malvern in 1995. He was first ridden by Diana Burgess through novice and intermediate levels. In 1999 the ride was taken over by William Fox-Pitt. Together they represented Britain in international competitions from 2002. Tamarillo was withdrawn after the cross country phase of the Athens Olympics after chipping his stifle.

In September 2013 it was announced that a clone of Tamarillo, named Tomatillo, had been born.

== Achievements ==
2000

- Blarney CCI** - 1st
- Gatcombe Park BCI - 1st
- Blenheim Horse Trials CCI*** - 2nd

2002

- Badminton Horse Trials CCI**** - 2nd
- Jerez De La Fronter (World Equestrian Games) CH**** - 14th and Team Bronze medal

2004

- Badminton Horse Trials CCI**** - 1st
- Athens Olympics CH**** - Team Silver

2005

- Badminton Horse Trials CCI**** - 2nd
- FEI Blenheim Petplan European Eventing Championships CH*** - Individual Silver and Team Gold Medals

2006

- Aachen (World Equestrian Games) CH**** - 15th and Team Silver medal

2008

- Burghley Horse Trials CCI**** - 1st
