= Rotational falls =

Type of fall in which a horse lands on its back

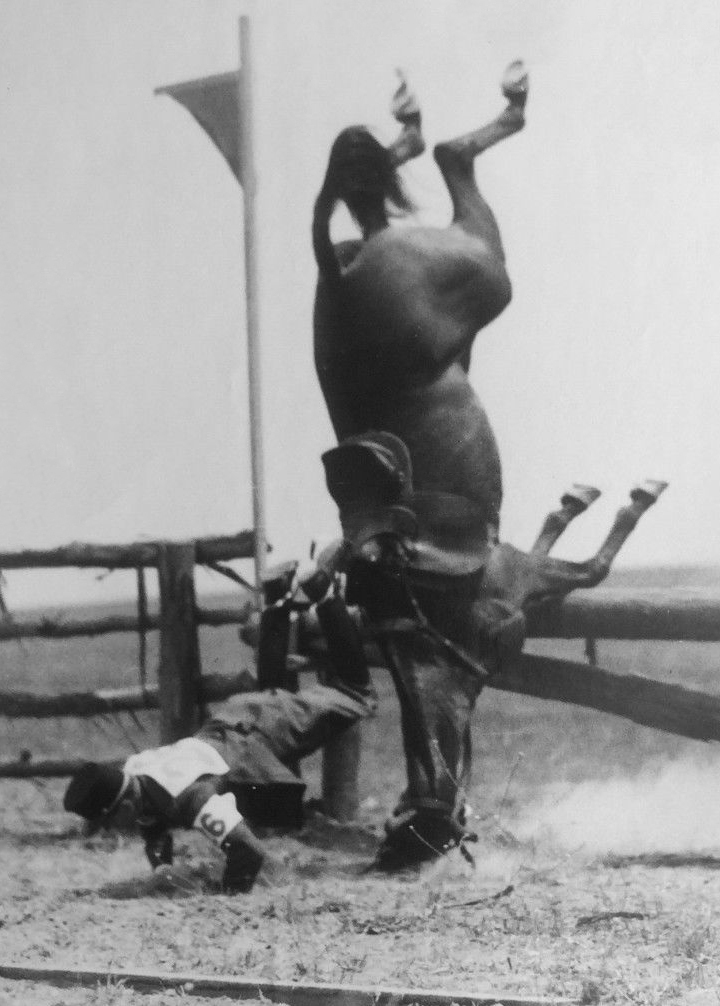
An example of a rotational fall

Rotational falls occur when a horse falls in such a manner as to somersault before landing on its back. It is of particular concern in the sport of eventing, especially in the cross-country phase of the competition. These falls can cause grave injuries and in the past have resulted in fatalities; such fatalities have spiked in recent years, prompting investigations and movements worldwide to increase the safety for participants.

Eventing is a three-phase competition consisting of dressage, cross-country, and show jumping. Riders worldwide compete in eventing, up to an Olympic level.

== Description ==
Falls of the rider from the horse are common and can occur at any point in time, from training to the middle of a competition. Horse riding is described as a "hazardous pastime", with a high level of injuries and in some cases, death. One large contributor to these fatality statistics is that of a rotational fall. "Between May 1997 and September 2007 25 rider deaths occurred around the world in the sport of Eventing", 18 of these fatalities resulting from rotational falls.

A rotational fall is defined as when the "horse forward somersaults in the air before landing on its back." This often occurs as a result of the horse hitting the fence with its front legs while jumping. The likelihood of a fall can be increased by a variety of factors, including the condition of the ground, the experience of the rider, the experience of the horse, the type of jump, the undertaking of the course prior to the fall, and the position on the scoreboard.

=== Prevalence in the sport of eventing ===
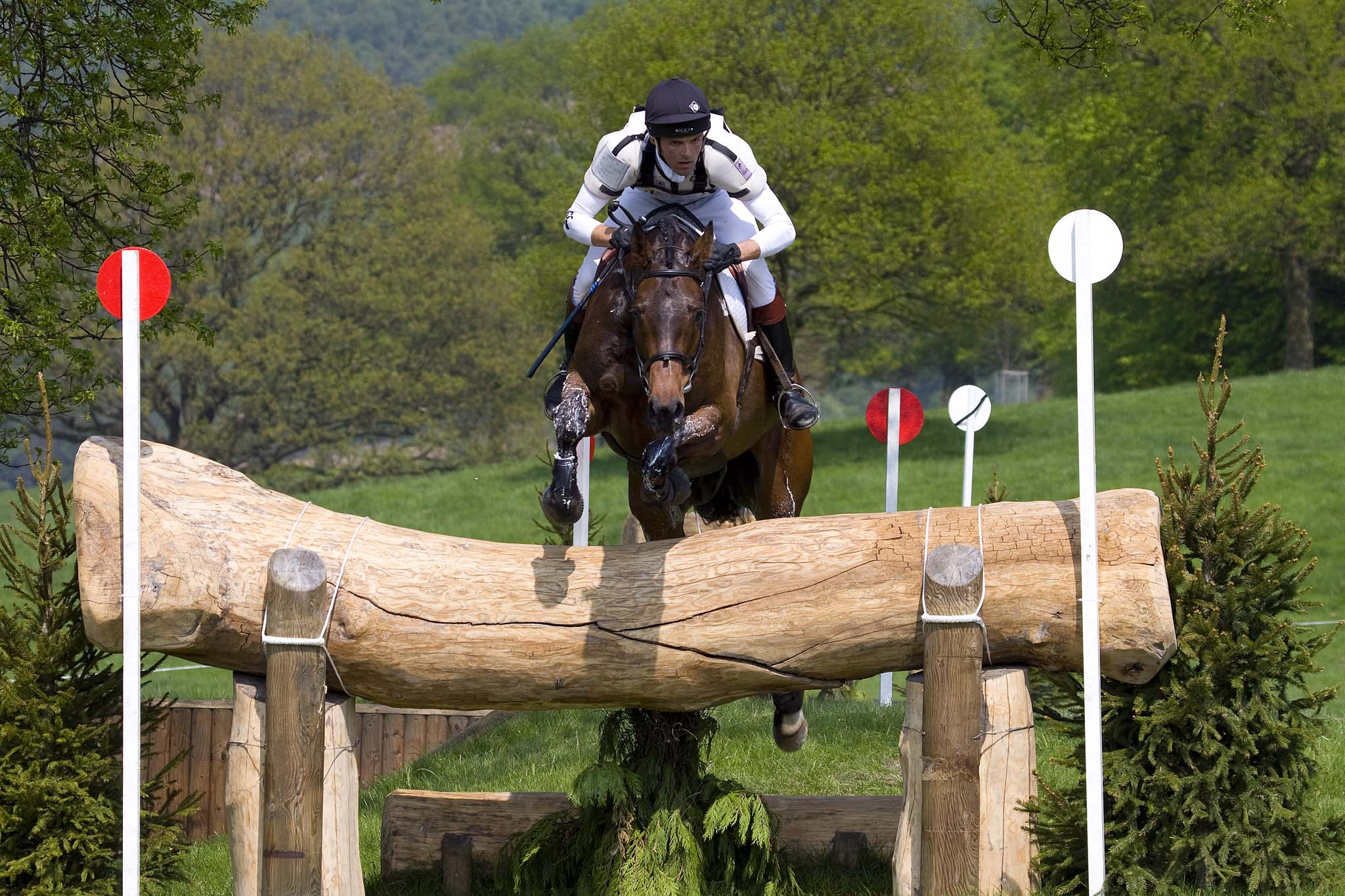
The cross-country portion of an eventing competition, the primary venue at which rotational falls are an issue in equestrian sport.

The cross country phase of eventing presents a course of obstacles that horse and rider must navigate through to the finish line. These obstacles are solid and unforgiving. (Photos below show examples of jumps on a course.) The jumps' solidity "demands that a rider approach the jump at exactly the right speed, take off from the right angle and spot". Rotational falls are most likely to occur during cross country as the fall occurs when the "horse hits a solid fence either with its chest or upper forelegs". This becomes increasingly likely the higher the jumps get. Historically, rotational falls also occurred during the show jumping phase, as rails used to be fixed to the wings that held them; in modern times, however, the jumps are designed with cups holding the rails, which allows them to roll out and fall down if struck by the horse.

== Background and case studies ==
Eventing is considered a "high-risk equestrian sport". Injuries to both horse and rider as a result of competition in Eventing have occurred throughout history and around the world, and it is "a sport in which the vast majority of rider injuries are minor and insignificant, but in which the possibility of catastrophic results always exist".

=== Statistics ===
Although Eventing as a sport dates to 1902, it wasn't until 1999 that concerns of horse and rider safety emerged. That year, there were five rider fatalities as a result of falls in the United Kingdom alone, four of which resulted from rotational falls. As a result of these fatalities, in April 2000 the Fédération Equestre Internationale (FEI) conducted "The International Eventing Safety Committee Report" and recommended creating an FEI Annual Report to cover a variety of subjects. Between 1997 and 2008, "at least 37 eventing riders have died as a result of injuries incurred while competing in the cross-country phase of eventing". At least 25 of these deaths resulted from rotational falls. These deaths ranged in location (concentrations of deaths in the United States and United Kingdom) and level of competition (pony club, national or international competition). However, some "top competitors, coaches and course designers argue that the sport's death and injury toll is most likely related to an influx of new riders to the sport", suggesting a lack of experience increases the likelihood of suffering a fall.

The FEI conducted a statistic report on Eventing Risk Management, presenting statistics on competitions, starters, falls and injuries between 2006 and 2016. In 2006 there were a total of 13,660 starters, with 789 falls, of these falls 51 were classified as rotational horse falls and 12 were considered to result in the rider suffering serious injuries. However, ten years later in 2016 there has been a significant increase (of 6261 riders) in starters to 19,921 riders, of these there were 1064 falls. However, despite an increase in both competitors and overall falls only 30 of these were classified as rotational falls, and 5 riders were considered to result in the rider suffering serious injuries. Comparing these rotational fall statistics across a ten-year expanse convey a clear decrease in rotational falls and rotational falls resulting in serious injury.

== Improving rider safety ==
Horse riding is considered a dangerous sport. However, "while equestrian sports are considered to have a certain degree of risk associated with them, there are ways to make them safer". Safety measures continue to be introduced to reduce these risks; these measures revolve around both the rider, the horse and course design.

=== Helmets ===
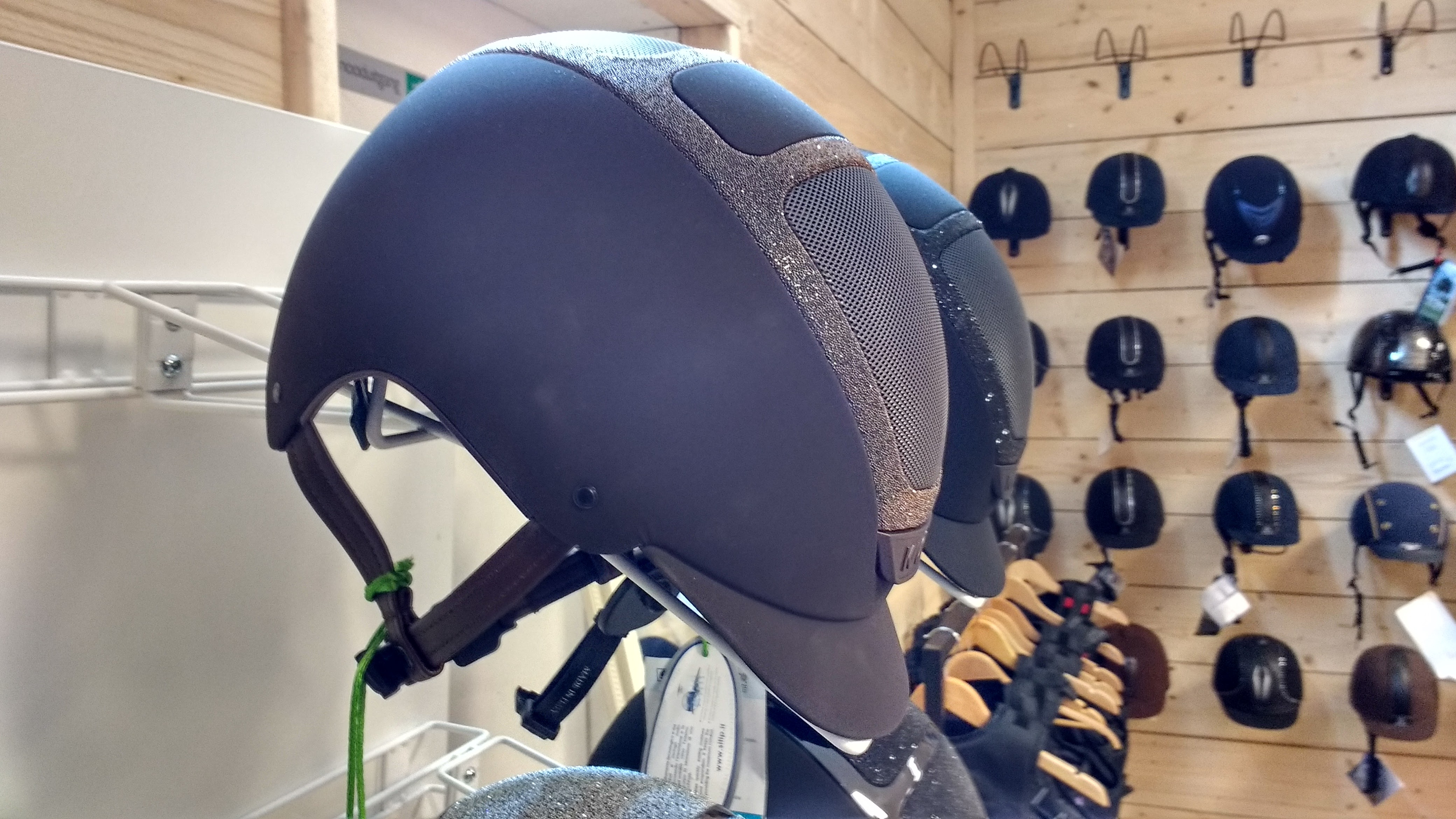
A selection of riding helmets

The rules of competition as guided by the FEI and individually enforced by countries around the world with their own bodies drafting standards for riders state that all riders are required to wear "an accredited safety helmet during cross country competition". These standards are reviewed and updated regularly by both the FEI and individual countries. For example, Equestrian Australia have introduced a new regulation, Helmet Tagging. This will "enable officials to more easily identify those helmets complying with standards", all helmets must have a coloured tag on them visible to officials which conveys the helmet has been checked and complies to current standards.

=== Body protectors ===
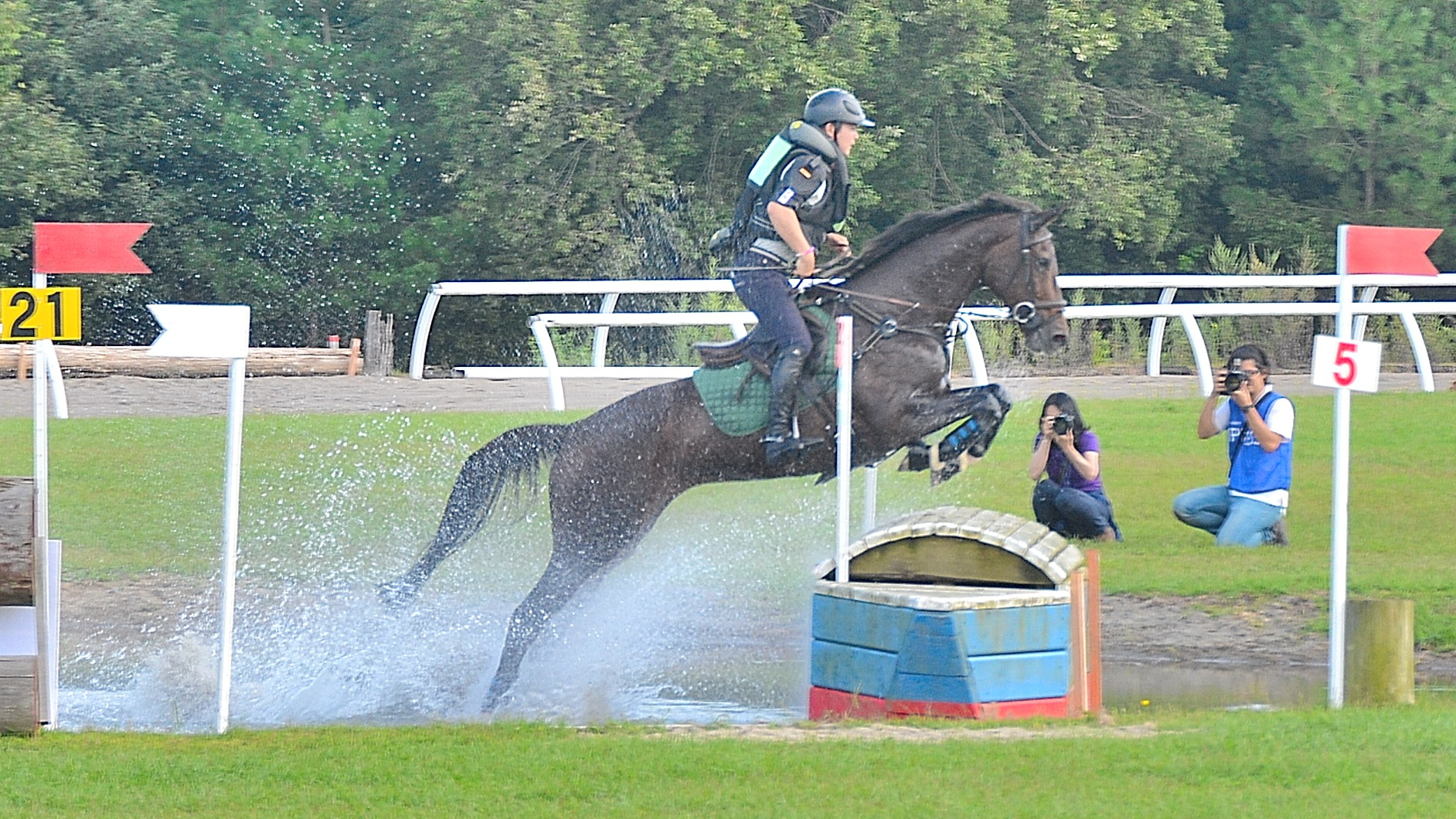
This rider is wearing a protective vest

Body protectors are pieces of equipment used by riders in many different types of riding, including the cross country phase of eventing. A body protector traditionally "is a foam filled vest to be worn over clothes". It is designed to protect the upper body (the ribs and spine) from serious injury if a fall occurs. The regulation of body protectors had been discussed by the National Eventing Committee (NEC) many times; however, "only by the end of 2006 did the NEC decide that body protectors would be compulsory". Between 2000 and 2006 a study was conducted on body protectors in which riders were asked 'Were you wearing a back protector?'; over 90% of riders "indicated that they were wearing one, despite there being no regulation requiring this".

In 2009 a new type of body protector was introduced, the inflatable vest. The design is of "a gas canister, connected by a cord to the horse's saddle, [that] is discharged when the cord is pulled during a fall, inflating the jacket in a fraction of a second". This design has the potential to reduce the chance of fatality as a result of a rotational falls due to its design aiming to disperse the force of an impact "and reduce compression of the chest".

=== Greasing horse's legs ===
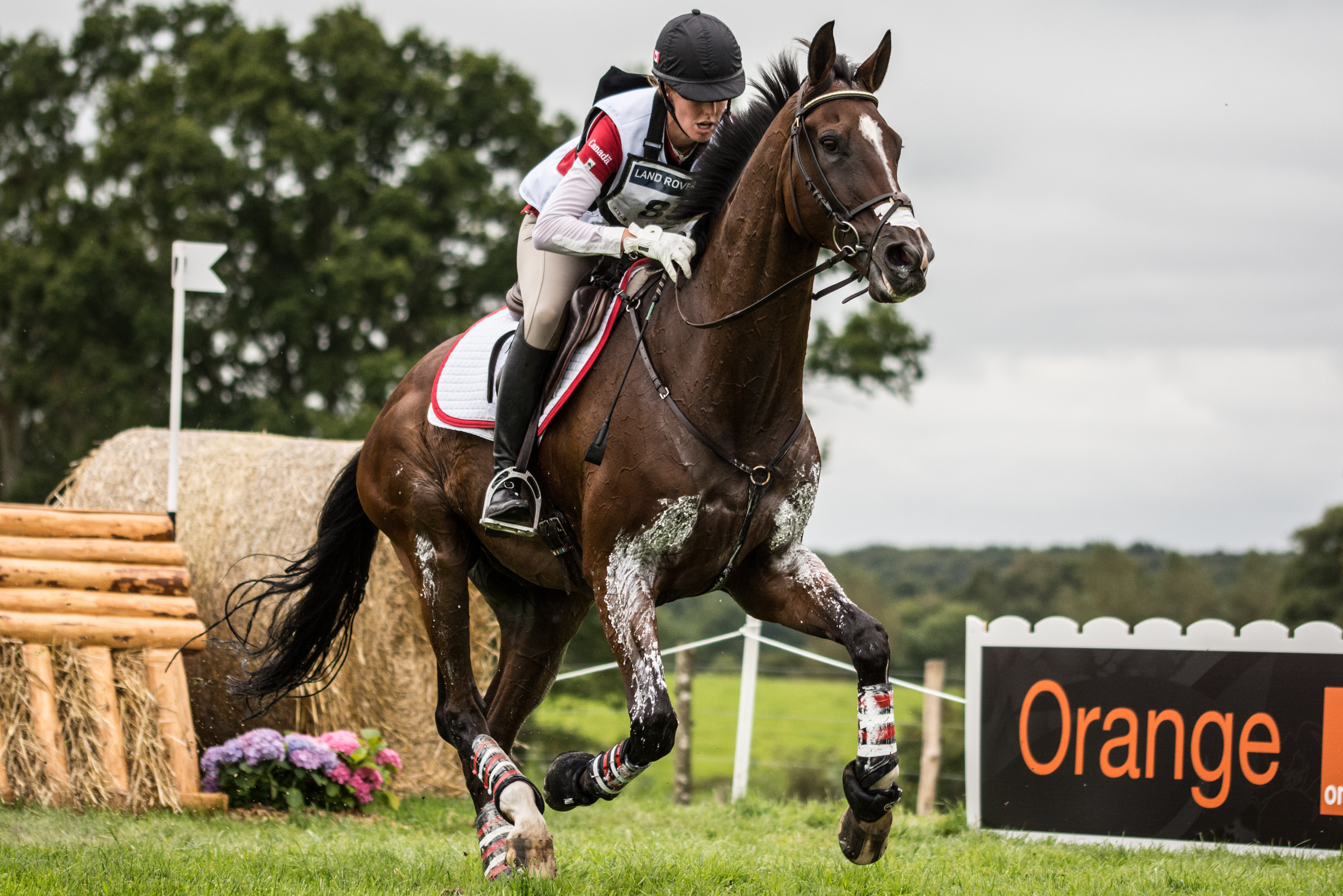
Greased legs

Although fewer protective measures are available for horses, one key technique used by riders to increase the safety of the horse is greasing its legs. Riders place grease on "a horse's front and hind legs to prevent trauma from the brush jumps, and if they hit an obstacle, they'll slide off it a little bit more". This practice assists in preventing of rotational falls as it helps the legs, even if they hit the jump, to slide over it instead of being caught or left behind and causing a trip or fall.

== Improving course safety ==
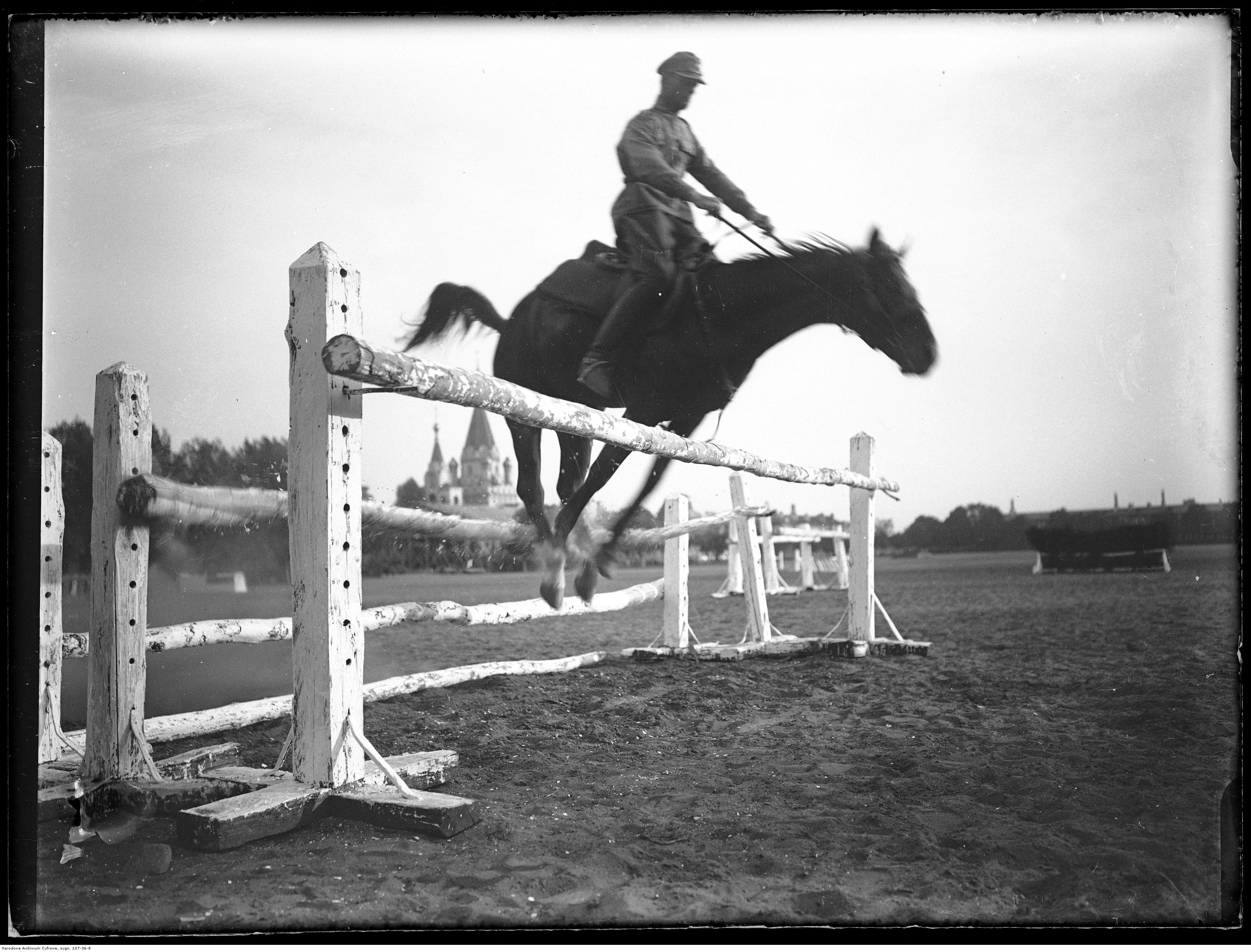
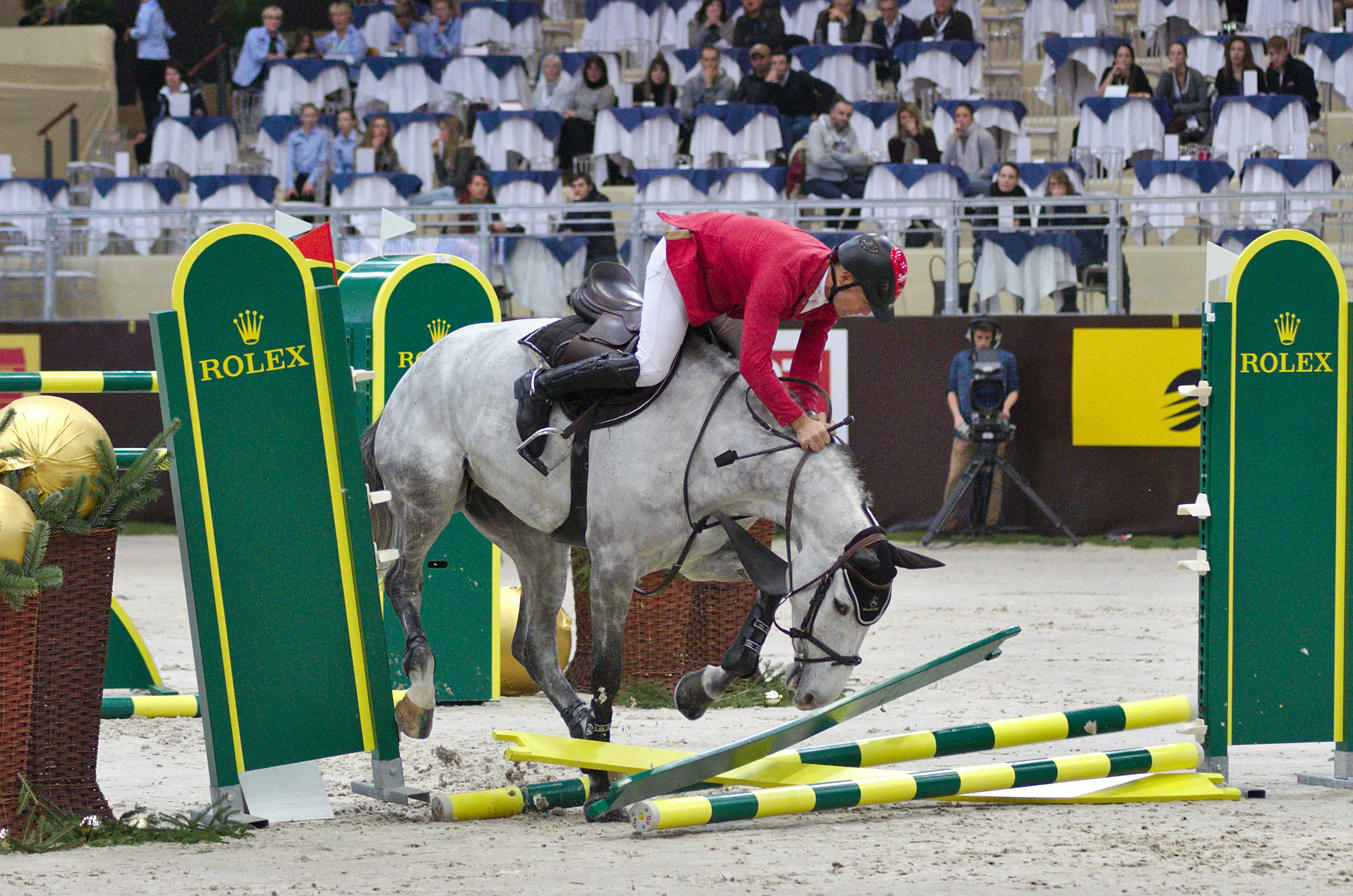
If the top pole of the fence (left) was solid and not breakaway, this error would result in a rotational fall. When the fence breaks away (right), horses are more able to get their legs back under them and not fall.

The cross country course itself poses the largest risks to the horse and rider for experiencing a rotational fall, this is due to the uniquely solid nature of jumps on a cross country course (as opposed to collapsible fences on a show jumping course). Over the years there have been many discussions regarding methods and technologies available to improve the safety of a fence and the "breakability" of a fence is at the centre of discussions. An "extreme version of maximising breakability would be just putting show jumps in a field", however that has been criticised as it defeats the purpose of the challenge of the cross country phase as uniquely different from show jumping. Two key technological advances have been adopted improve the safety in the cross country phase of eventing to minimise the possibility of a rotational fall.

=== Frangible pins and mim clips ===
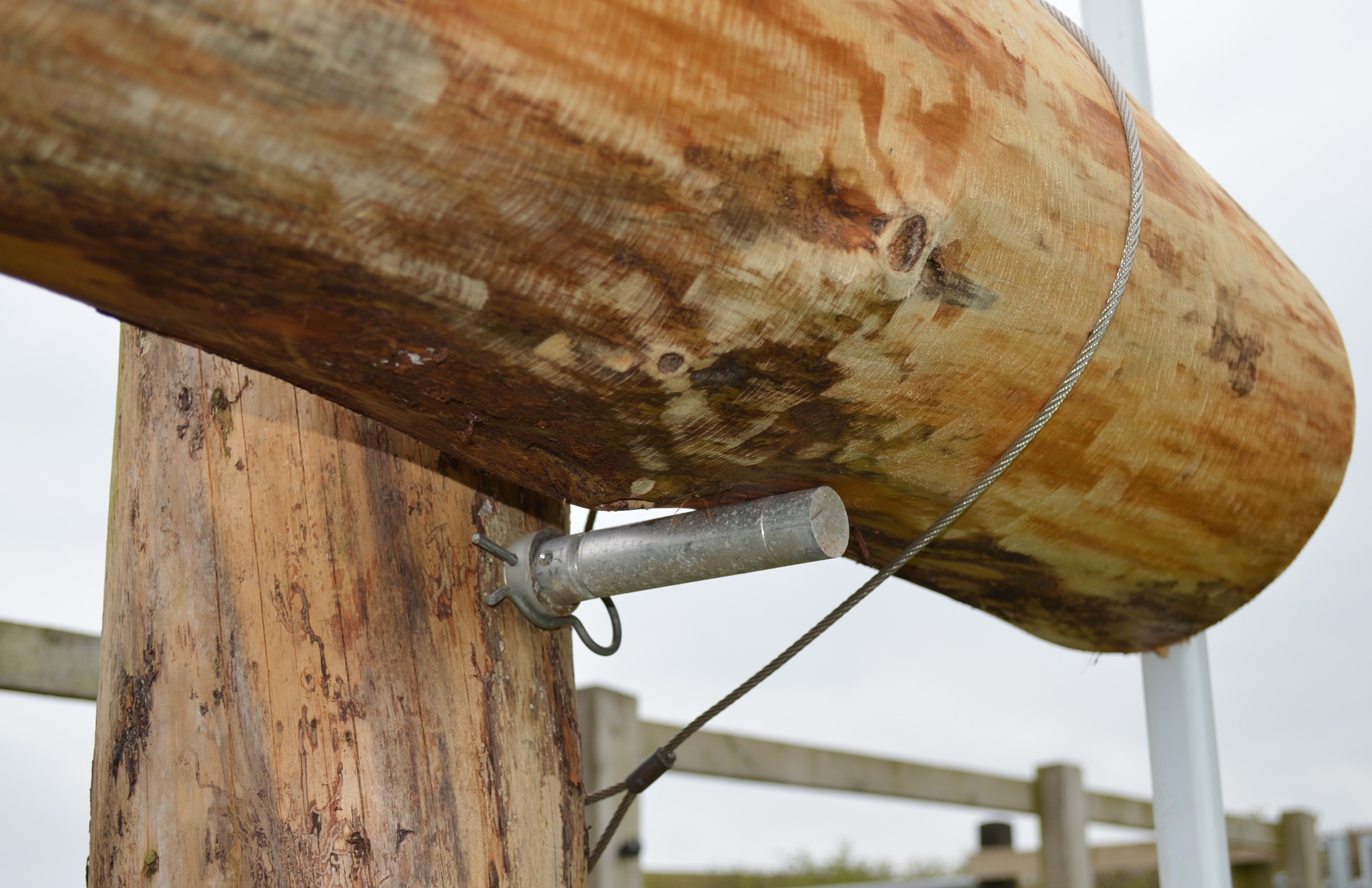
Closeup of a frangible pin

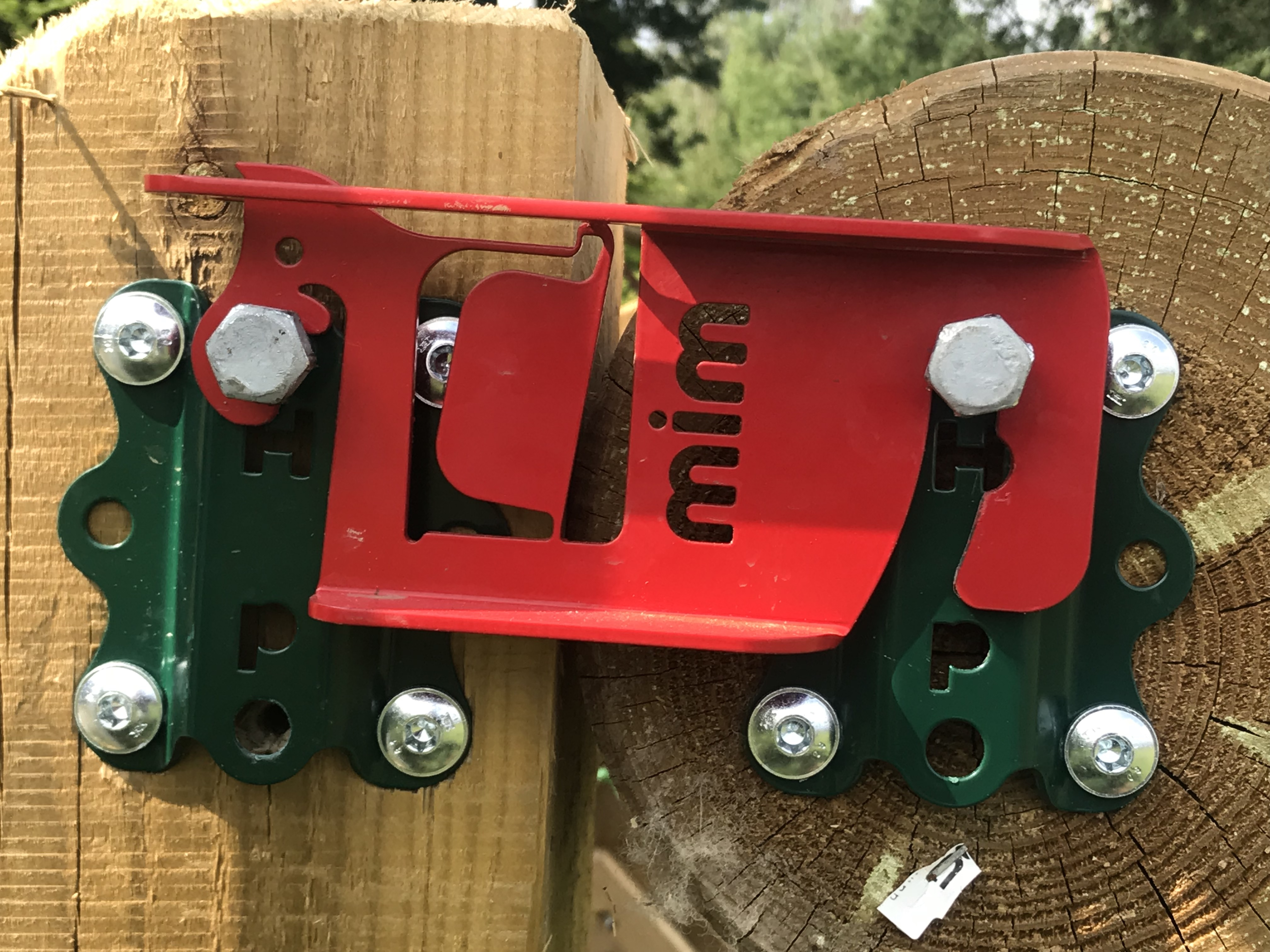
MIM clip on cross-country fence

Frangible pins and mim clips are "pins and hinges that break and swing down if a horse hits it, reducing the chances of a fall for both rider and horse". As this technology is relatively new, those who employ it are still learning the 'in field' mechanisms of the pins and clips. "The important thing to remember is that a device is just a mechanical object that will do certain things under certain circumstances according to its design". Statistics on the use of frangible pins demonstrate that "angles and impact factor in" to the technical process of a pin or clip breaking and allowing the jump to fall. Although "horse falls cannot be completely avoided... the use of frangible devices allows the fence to drop on contact therefore preventing a horse from falling". The horse is more likely to trip and regain an upright position as opposed to performing a full rotation. In commenting on the introduction of frangible pins to Australia in the Equestrian Australia 'Making Eventing Safer Fund', "dual Olympic medallist, course designer and coach Stuart Tinney" said "it's very exciting to be able to introduce more safer fences to Eventing".

== List of rotational falls resulting in fatalities ==
Australia

- On 6 March 2016 Olivia Inglis was fatally injured when she and her horse Coriolanus fell at the second fence of a combination during the cross country phase of Scone Horse Trials in New South Wales. Seven weeks later on 30 April 2016, Caitlyn Fischer was fatally injured when she and her horse Ralphie fell at the second fence during the cross country phase of the Sydney International Horse Trials. In 2019, coroner's inquests were conducted into the deaths of Inglis and Fischer. Both brought up broader concerns regarding safety issues within the sport of eventing, and resulted in a wide range of recommendations into the areas of safety officers, course design, review processes, event management, athlete representatives, personal protective equipment, data collection, medical coverage, event organisation and fence judges.
- On 16 May 2021, Kasheer, a horse ridden by Pakistani Olympic hopeful Usman Khan, died at an Olympic eventing qualifier in South Australia. The horse caught his knee on the final jump of the cross-country phase, causing a rotational fall, landed on his neck, and died instantly of a proximal cervical fracture.

Belarus

- On 10 September 2016 Russian event rider Nikita Sotskov died while competing at the CIC3* at Ratomka Horse Trials in Minsk, Belarus after experiencing a rotational fall on fence 21.

France

- On 23 September 2017, Maxime Debost died when his horse Qurt de Montplaisir had a rotational fall at fence 11 on the cross country course of the Châteaubriant Horse Trials. The horse was uninjured.

Germany

- On 14 June 2014 Benjamin Winter was killed in a rotational fall while competing at the Luhmühlen CCI**** event. He and his mount Ispo fell at fence 20 on the course. Ispo was uninjured.

Portugal

- On 2 March 2013, French rider Bruno Bouvier was killed when his horse had a rotational fall at fence five at the Barroca D'Alva horse trials in Portugal. His horse Arcilloso II was uninjured.

United Kingdom

- On 4 September 2004, British eventer Caroline Pratt died during the Burghley Horse Trials when her horse Primitive Streak fell at the water jump leaving Pratt submerged in about two feet of water. Resuscitation attempts on scene and in hospital were unsuccessful.
- On 18 August 2013, New Zealand event rider Tom Gadsby died after experiencing a rotational fall while competing in the Somerford Park International Horse Trials CCI* event. His horse was uninjured.
- On 11 August 2019, Iona Sclater died from a crush injury to her chest when her horse clipped a 1.32 meters high fence at her home, resulting in a rotational fall.

United States

- On 14 May 2016, Philippa Humphreys died after a rotational fall with her horse Rich N Famous at fence 16, a table, at the Jersey Fresh International Three-Day Event in New Jersey.
- On 11 July 2019, 13-year-old Ashley Stout and her horse both died after a rotational fall while practicing cross country in Pennsylvania.

== See also ==
- List of horse accidents
- Eventing
- Cross country riding
