= Individual dressage at the 2011 European Dressage Championships =

The individual dressage at the 2011 European Dressage Championships in Rotterdam, The Netherlands was held at Kralingen-Crooswijk from August 17 and August 21, 2011.

The Netherlands's Adelinde Cornelissen won the gold medal in the Grand Prix Special and the Grand Prix Freestyle. Carl Hester representing Great Britain won a silver medal the Grand Prix Special and silver in the Grand Prix Freestyle. Laura Bechtolsheimer of Great Britain won a bronze in the Special and Patrik Kittel of Sweden won bronze in the Freestyle. In the Grand Prix Great Britain won the golden team medal, while Germany won the silver medal and The Netherlands bronze.

== Competition format ==
The team and individual dressage competitions used the same results. Dressage had three phases. The first phase was the Grand Prix. Top 30 individuals advanced to the second phase, the Grand Prix Special where the first individual medals were awarded. The last set of medals at the 2011 European Dressage Championships was awarded after the third phase, the Grand Prix Freestyle where top 15 combinations competed, with a maximum of the three best riders per country.

== Judges ==
The European Dressage Championships was assessed by seven judges.

- (Netherlands) Ghislain Fouarge (Ground Jury President)
- (Australia) Mary Seefried (Ground Jury Member)
- (Germany) Evi Eisenhardt (Ground Jury Member)
- (Mexico) Maribel Alonso de Quinzanos (Ground Jury Member)
- (Poland) Wojtek Markowski (Ground Jury Member)
- (United Kingdom) Stephen Clarke (Ground Jury Member)
- (France) Jean-Michel Roudier (Ground Jury Member)
- (United States) Gary Rockwell (Reserve judge)

== Schedule ==
All times are Central European Summer Time (UTC+1)

Date	Time	Round
Wednesday, 17 August 2011	09:30	Grand Prix (Day 1)
Thursday, 18 August 2011	09:30	Grand Prix (Day 2)
Saturday, 20 August 2011	12:30	Grand Prix Special
Sunday, 21 August 2011	13:00	Grand Prix Freestyle

== Results ==
Rider	Nation	Horse	GP score	Rank	GPS score	Rank	GPF score	Rank
Carl Hester	Great Britain	Uthopia	82.568	1 Q	81.682	(silver) Q	84.179	2nd place, silver medalist(s)
Adelinde Cornelissen	Netherlands	Parzival	81.155	2 Q	82.113	(gold) Q	88.839	1st place, gold medalist(s)
Matthias Alexander Rath	Germany	Totilas	79.453	3 Q	77.039	4 Q	81.696	5
Charlotte Dujardin	Great Britain	Valegro	78.830	4 Q	76.548	6 Q	79.357	9
Laura Bechtolsheimer	Great Britain	Mistral Hojris	77.280	5 Q	79.256	(bronze) Q	83.018	4
Patrik Kittel	Sweden	Watermill Scandic	76.474	6 Q	76.771	5 Q	83.429	3rd place, bronze medalist(s)
Isabell Werth	Germany	El Santo NRW	75.213	7 Q	76.533	7 Q	80.536	7
Juan Manuel Munoz Diaz	Spain	Fuego de Cardenas	73.404	8 Q	73.155	11 Q	80.982	6
Victoria Max-Theurer	Austria	Augustin OLD	72.812	9 Q	68.899	20		
Valentina Truppa	Italy	Eremo Del Castegno	72.143	10 Q	70.193	16 Q	73.054	13
Christoph Koschel	Germany	Donnperignon	71.444	10 Q	73.750	10		
Nathalie Zu-Sayn Wittgenstein	Denmark	Digby	71.383	12 Q	75.060	9 Q	78.804	10
Siril Helljesen	Norway	Dorina	71.261	13 Q	68.036	23		
Helen Langehanenberg	Germany	Damon Hill NRW	71.079	14 Q	75.283	8 Q	80.446	8
Hans-Peter Minderhoud	Netherlands	Exquis Nadine	70.912	15 Q	70.997	14 Q	76.589	11
Sander Marijnissen	Netherlands	Moedwill	70.578	16 Q	69.792	17		
Edward Gal	Netherlands	Sisther de Jeu	70.517	17 Q	69.211	18		
Emile Faurie	Great Britain	Elmegardens Marquis	70.426	18 Q	68.557	21		
Jordi Domingo Coll	Spain	Prestige	70.334	19 Q	69.167	19		
Emma Kanerva	Finland	Sini Spirit	70.198	20 Q	EL	30		
Lisbeth Seierskilde	Denmark	Jonstrupgaardens Raneur	69.970	21 Q	70.551	15 Q	72.268	14
Tinne Vilhelmson-Silfven	Sweden	Favourit	69.939	22 Q	71.771	12 Q	70.500	15
Beata Stremler	Poland	Martini	69.650	23 Q	71.637	13 Q	74.446	12
Jeroen Devroe	Belgium	Apollo van het Vijverhof	69.559	24 Q	67.143	26		
Gonçalo Carvalho	Portugal	Rubi	69.362	25 Q	66.979	27		
Katarzyna Milczarek	Poland	Ekwador	68.967	26 Q	68.482	22		
Anne van Olst	Denmark	Clearwater	68.632	27 Q	65.997	29		
Mikaela Lindh	Finland	Skovlunds Más Guapo	68.450	27 Q	67.247	24		
Terhi Stegars	Finland	Axis TSF	68.131	29 Q	67.217	25		
Rose Mathisen	Sweden	Bocelli 1044	68.024	30 Q	66.786	28		
Michal Rapcewicz	Poland	Randon	67.888	31				
Beatriz Ferrer-Salat	Spain	Faberge	67.842	32				
Philippe Jorissen	Belgium	Le Beau	67.751	33				
Sune Hansen	Denmark	Romanov	67.660	34				
Peter Gmoser	Austria	Cointreau	67.492	35				
Maria Caetano	Portugal	Xiripiti	67.173	36				
Claudio Castilla Ruiz	Spain	Jade de MV	66.900	37				
Cecilia Dorselius	Sweden	Lennox	66.763	38				
Marcela Krinke-Susmelj	Switzerland	Smeyers Molberg	66.550	39				
Renate Voglsang	Austria	Fabriano 58	66.474	40				
Lillann Jebsen	Norway	Pro-Set	66.292	41				
Susanna Bordone	Italy	Dark Surprise	66.246	42				
Anna Merveldt	Ireland	Coryolano	66.231	43				
Hans Staub	Switzerland	Warbeau	66.216	44				
Elisabeth Eversfield-Koch	Switzerland	Rokono N	66.155	45				
Anne-Sophie Serre	France	Le Guerrier	65.152	46				
Robert Acs	Hungary	Weinzauber 2	65.061	47				
Tatyana Makarova	Russia	Fatinitza	65.030	48				
Arnaud Serre	France	Helio II	65.030	48				
Claudia Fassaert	Belgium	Donnerfee	64.818	50				
Markus Graf	Switzerland	Ronaldo II	64.696	51				
Luis Principe	Portugal	World Performance Washington	64.620	52				
Sergey Puzko	Ukraine	Komlipment	64.590	53				
Cathrine Rasmussen	Norway	Orlando III	63.906	54				
Tatiana Dorofeeva	Russia	Khorovod	63.450	55				
Sebastien Duperdu	France	Passe Partout	63.374	56				
Judy Reynolds	Ireland	Remember 143	62.614	57				
Johan Zagers	Belgium	Question de Liberte	62.584	58				
Ester Soldi	Italy	Harmonia	61.292	59				
Gaston Chelius	Luxembourg	Flamenco R	61.261	60				
Grete Ayache	Estonia	O.Hot Chocolate	60.380	61				
Camilla Kalseth	Norway	Carte d´Or	60.243	62				
Alexandra Malmström	Finland	MD Waterford	59.681	63				
Yulia Vinnitskaja	Russia	Vodevil	55.699	64				
Catherine Henriquet	France	Paradieszauber	WD	65				
