= 2011 CHIO Aachen =

German horse show

The 2011 CHIO Aachen was the 2011 edition of the CHIO Aachen, the German official horse show in five horse sport disciplines (show jumping, dressage, eventing, four-in-hand-driving and vaulting).

In 2011 the event was also the FEI selected 2012 Olympic Qualification for Central and Eastern Europe, Asia and Oceania in show jumping.

== Introduction ==
The 2011 CHIO Aachen is held as CSIO 5* (show jumping), CDIO 5* (dressage), CICO 3* (eventing), CAIO (four-in-hand-driving) and CVIO 2* (vaulting). It Olympic Qualification is held as CSI 2*. The event is held between July 8, 2011 and July 17, 2011.

The CHIO Aachen is in show jumping and dressage the most prestigious horse show in Europe. It is also called "Weltfest der Pferdesports" (World Equestrian Festival). The competitions are held at different places at the Soers in Aachen. The show jumping competitions are held in the "Hauptstadion" of the CHIO Aachen, the dressage events are held in the "Deutsche Bank Stadion" and the vaulting competitions are held in the "Albert-Vahle-Halle". The first horse show were held 1924 in Aachen, together with a horse race. In 1927 the horse show lasted six days. The first show jumping Nations Cup was held here in 1929. Since 2007, influenced by the World Equestrian Games 2006 in Aachen, also eventing and vaulting are disciplines of the CHIO Aachen. In 2010 the 79th time a horse show is held in the Soers in Aachen.

== 2012 Olympic Qualification (show jumping) ==
The Olympic Qualification competition was a jumping competition with two rounds. It was held on Sunday, July 10, 2011 at 1:00 pm in the driving stadium. Resulting of the result of this competition the best team from Central and Eastern Europe, Asia and Oceania is qualified for the 2012 Summer Olympics. Also the NOC of best rider from South East Asia or Oceania is qualified for the 2012 Summer Olympics in London. The best competitor of this competition get a Wild card for the CSIO 5*-tour of the 2011 CHIO Aachen.

	qualified
best Group C or G team (Central and Eastern Europe, Asia, Oceania)	Ukraine
Group G competitor (South East Asia, Oceania)	Japan (because of the 10th place of Taizo Sugitani)
best competitor	(Ukraine) Katharina Offel

Team results

	Team	Rider	Horse	Round A	Round B	Total penalties	Prize €
	Team	Rider	Horse	Penalties	Penalties	Total penalties	Prize €
1	Ukraine	Cassio Rivetti	Verdi	0	9		
1	Ukraine	Björn Nagel	Niack de L´Abbaye	0	2		
1	Ukraine	Oleg Krasyuk	Canvas PKZ	13	14		
1	Ukraine	Katharina Offel	Vivant	0	1		
1	Ukraine			0	12	12	4,200 €
2	Turkey	Omer Karaevli	Dadjak ter Puttenen	4	18		
2	Turkey	Burak Azak	Castelo Branco	4	2		
2	Turkey	Çağrı Başel	Goldrush	0	14		
2	Turkey	Gerry Flynn	Ledgepoint	0	5		
2	Turkey			4	21	25	2,500 €
3	Poland	Andrzej Lemanski	Bischof L	8	7		
3	Poland	Piotr Sawicki	Caballus Z	1	24		
3	Poland	Aleksandra Lusina	Ekwador	1	6		
3	Poland	Msciwoj Kiecon	Urbane	4	14		
3	Poland			6	27	33	2,000 €
4	Hungary	Sándor Szász	Goldwing	0	8		
4	Hungary	Richárd Jován	Vajk	eliminated	did not start		
4	Hungary	Kaarlo Kovács	Cassius	8	14		
4	Hungary	Balázs Krucsó	Nemo	0	5		
4	Hungary			8	27	35	1,200 €
5	Azerbaijan	Patrick McEntee	Dollar Z	5	eliminated		
5	Azerbaijan	Francesco Franco	Loxley	5	19		
5	Azerbaijan	Seyid Musayev	Parodie	18	18		
5	Azerbaijan	Jamal Rahimov	Warrior	2	1		
5	Azerbaijan			12	38	50	850 €
5	Russia	Vladimir Tuganov	Mats´Up du Plessis	5	eliminated		
5	Russia	Vadim Konovalov	Come on	9	7		
5	Russia	Arsentiy Shpakovskiy	Tibor P	4	10		
5	Russia	Vladimir Beletsky	Larkanaro	5	19		
5	Russia			14	36	50	850 €

(Top 6 of 8 Teams)
Grey penalties points do not count for the team result.

Individual results

	Rider	Horse	Round 1	Round 2	Total penalties	Time (s) (second rounds)	prize money
1	(Ukraine) Katharina Offel	Vivant	0	1	1	80.14	3,200 €
2	(Ukraine) Björn Nagel	Niack de L´Abbaye	0	2	2	81.01	2,000 €
3	(Azerbaijan) Jamal Rahimov	Warrior	2	1	3	79.96	1,500 €
4	(Turkey) Gerry Flynn	Ledgepoint	0	5	5	77.66	1,000 €
5	(Hungary) Balázs Krucsó	Nemo	0	5	5	78.18	800 €
6	(Turkey) Burak Azak	Castelo Branco	4	2	6	81.31	500 €
7	(Poland) Aleksandra Lusina	Ekwador	1	6	7	82.48	100 €
8	(Hungary) Sándor Szász	Goldwing	0	8	8	72.74	100 €
9	(Ukraine) Cassio Rivetti	Verdi	4	5	9	78.41	100 €
10	(Japan) Taizo Sugitani	Avenzio	4	5	9	78.47	100 €
11	(Chinese Taipei) Jasmin Chen	Corlando	0	9	9	79.36	100 €

(Top 11 of 37 Competitors)

== Nations Cup of Germany (vaulting) ==
The 2011 vaulting Nations Cup of Germany was part of the 2011 CHIO Aachen and was held Sunday, July 10. It was a combined competition of three Freestyle vaulting competitions (single vaulting – Men, single vaulting – Women and team vaulting). Unlike the other disciplines nations could start with more than one team.

	Team	Vaulter	Group	Longeur	Horse	result
1	Germany I	Pia Engelberty		Alexandra Knauf	Weltoni RS von der Wintermühle	8.240
1	Germany I	Jannik Heiland		Lars Hansen	Dance of Gold	8.480
1	Germany I		RSV Neuss Grimlinghausen	Jessica Schmitz	Arkansas	8.700
1	Germany I					25.420
2	Germany II	Viktor Brüsewitz		Lars Hansen	Gustafsson	8.140
2	Germany II	Kristina Boe		Winnie Schlüter	Le Beau	8.300
2	Germany II		Voltigierverein Ingelsberg	Alexander Hartl	Arador	8.576
2	Germany II					25.016
3	Austria	Christa Kristofics-Binder		Fritz Schandl	Alonso	7.853
3	Austria	Stefan Csandl		Julie Newell	Solitaire Legacy	8.260
3	Austria		UVT Salzburg / Freisaal	Nina Rossin	Robin	7.398
3	Austria					23.511
4	Switzerland	Simone Jäiser		Rita Blieske	Luk	7.993
4	Switzerland	Patric Looser		Alexandra Knauf	Record RS v. d. Wintermühle	8.680
4	Switzerland		Voltige-Club Harlekin	Rita Blieske	Apriso CH	6.736
4	Switzerland					23.409

(Top 4 of 8 teams)

== Prize of Europe (show jumping) ==
The "Preis von Europa" (Prize of Europe), a competition held since 1960, was the first main competition in show jumping at the 2011 CHIO Aachen. The sponsor of this competition was the Warsteiner Brewery. It was held on Wednesday, July 13, 2011 at 2:00 pm. The competition was a show jumping competition with one round and one jump-off, the height of the fences were up to 1.55 meters. The Prize of Europe was endowed with 60,000 €.

On a rainy day seven riders had not faults with her horses in the first round. Winner of the competition is Meredith Michaels-Beerbaum with the 18-year-old darkbay gelding Shutterfly.

	Rider	Horse	Round 1	jump-off		prize money
	Rider	Horse	Penalties	Penalties	Time (s)	prize money
1	(Germany) Meredith Michaels-Beerbaum	Shutterfly	0	0	46.27	19,800 €
2	(Germany) Ludger Beerbaum	Chaman	0	0	47.18	12,000 €
3	(United States) Laura Kraut	Teirra	0	0	49.92	9,000 €
4	(Switzerland) Pius Schwizer	Carlina	0	4	47.43	6,000 €
5	(Ukraine) Katharina Offel	Sanctos van het Gravenhof	0	4	49.08	3,000 €

(Top 5 of 52 Competitors)

== Grand Prix de Dressage / Nations Cup of Germany (dressage) ==
The 2011 dressage Nations Cup of Germany was part of the 2011 CHIO Aachen. Unlike 2010, only the result of the Grand Prix de Dressage has count for the Nations Cup result. Each team consist of three or four team riders, three results of each team count for the Nations Cup ranking.

The sponsor of the Grand Prix de Dressage is Tesch Inkasso, the dressage Nations Cup ranking is sponsored by the Lambertz-Group.

=== Team result ===
	Team	Rider	Horse	Score
1	Germany	Anabel Balkenhol	Dablino	did not start (horse was not fit to compete)
1	Germany	Christoph Koschel	Donnperignon	73.362 %
1	Germany	Isabell Werth	El Santo NRW	77.830 %
1	Germany	Matthias Alexander Rath	Totilas	82.149 %
1	Germany			233.341 %
2	Great Britain	Richard Davison	Hiscox Artemis	68.894 %
2	Great Britain	Charlotte Dujardin	Fernandez	71.383 %
2	Great Britain	Emile Faurie	Elmegardens Marequis	66.681 %
2	Great Britain	Laura Bechtolsheimer	Mistral Hojris	80.596 %
2	Great Britain			220.873 %
3	Netherlands	Marlies van Baalen	Phoebe DVB	67.106 %
3	Netherlands	Hans Peter Minderhoud	Tango	70.128 %
3	Netherlands	Edward Gal	Sister de Jeu	71.489 %
3	Netherlands	Adelinde Cornelissen	Parzival	77.340 %
3	Netherlands			218.957 %
4	United States	Jan Ebeling	Rafalca	66.574 %
4	United States	Todd Flettrich	Otto	66.851 %
4	United States	Guenter Seidel	U II	68.532 %
4	United States	Steffen Peters	Ravel	77.191 %
4	United States			212.574 %
5	Sweden	Charlotte Haid-Bondergaard	Lydianus	63.553 %
5	Sweden	Cecilia Dorselius	Lennox	67.617 %
5	Sweden	Patrik Kittel	Toy Story	67.681 %
5	Sweden	Tinne Vilhelmson-Silfven	Favourit	72.745 %
5	Sweden			208.043 %
6	Denmark	Anne van Olst	Clearwater	67.553 %
6	Denmark	Sune Hansen	Romanov	67.234 %
6	Denmark	Andreas Helgstrand	Marron	57.936 %
6	Denmark	Nathalie of Sayn-Wittgenstein	Digby	71.915 %
6	Denmark			206.702 %
7	Spain	Beatriz Ferrer-Salat	Faberge	68.553 %
7	Spain	Claudio Castilla Ruiz	Jade de MV	61.723 %
7	Spain	Jordi Domingo Coll	Prestige	65.957 %
7	Spain	Juan Manuel Muñoz Díaz	Fuego	72.106 %
7	Spain			206.616 %
8	Belgium	Ronny Coenraerds	Calypso van het Goorhof	65.064 %
8	Belgium	Johan Zagers	Question de Liberte	63.511 %
8	Belgium	Philippe Jorissen	Le Beau	67.638 %
8	Belgium	Jeroen Devroe	Apollo van het Vijverhof	68.191 %
8	Belgium			200.893 %

(grey penalties points do not count for the team result)

=== Individual result ===
	Rider	Horse	Score	prize money (€)
1	(Germany) Matthias Alexander Rath	Totilas	82.149 %	6,500 €
2	(United Kingdom) Laura Bechtolsheimer	Mistral Hojris	80.596 %	4,000 €
3	(Germany) Isabell Werth	El Santo NRW	77.830 %	3,000 €
4	(Netherlands) Adelinde Cornelissen	Parzival	77.340 %	2,000 €
5	(United States) Steffen Peters	Ravel	77.191 %	1,000 €

(top 5 of 37 competitors)

== FEI Nations Cup of Germany (show jumping) ==
The 2011 FEI Nations Cup of Germany in show jumping was part of the 2011 CHIO Aachen. It was the fifth competition of the 2011 FEI Nations Cup.

The 2011 FEI Nations Cup of Germany was held on Thursday, July 14, 2011 at 7:30 pm (second round under floodlight). The competing teams was: Ireland, Great Britain, the Netherlands, the United States of America, Denmark, Germany, Belgium and France.

The competition was a show jumping competition with two rounds and optionally one jump-off. The height of the fences were up to 1.60 meters. The Nations Cup was endowed with 220,000 €. Mercedes-Benz is the sponsor of this competition.

	Team	Rider	Horse	Round A	Round B	Total penalties	Jump-off		Prize money	scoring points
	Team	Rider	Horse	Penalties	Penalties	Total penalties	Penalties	Time (s)	Prize money	scoring points
1	Netherlands	Eric van der Vleuten	Utascha SFN	4	0					
1	Netherlands	Jur Vrieling	Bubalu	8	17					
1	Netherlands	Gerco Schröder	New Orleans	4	4					
1	Netherlands	Jeroen Dubbeldam	Simon	0	0					
1	Netherlands			8	4	12			72,000 €	10
2	Ireland	Shane Breen	Carmena Z	8	0					
2	Ireland	Shane Sweetnam	Amaretto d´Arco	0	4					
2	Ireland	Denis Lynch	All Inclusive NRW	4	0					
2	Ireland	Billy Twomey	Tinka´s Serenade	8	5					
2	Ireland			12	4	16			34,333 €	6
2	Great Britain	Guy Williams	Titus	4	4					
2	Great Britain	Nick Skelton	Carlo	8	8					
2	Great Britain	Scott Brash	Intertoy Z	0	4					
2	Great Britain	Michael Whitaker	Amai	0	4					
2	Great Britain			4	12	16			34,333 €	6
2	Germany	Christian Ahlmann	Taloubet Z	4	8					
2	Germany	Janne Friederike Meyer	Lambrasco	0	4					
2	Germany	Carsten-Otto Nagel	Corradina	0	0					
2	Germany	Ludger Beerbaum	Gotha FRH	4	8					
2	Germany			4	12	16			34,333 €	6
5	France	Pénélope Leprevost	Mylord Carthago	0	8					
5	France	Olivier Guillon	Lord de Theize	0	4					
5	France	Kevin Staut	Silvana	4	4					
5	France	Michel Robert	Kellemoi de Pepita	4	8					
5	France			4	16	20			18,000 €	4
6	United States	McLain Ward	Antares F	4	16					
6	United States	Margie Engle	Indigo	12	16					
6	United States	Laura Kraut	Cedric	4	4					
6	United States	Beezie Madden	Coral Reef Via Volo	4	0					
6	United States			12	20	32			12,000 €	3
7	Denmark	Andreas Schou	Uno's Safier	8	16					
7	Denmark	Charlotte Lund	Cartani	eliminated	did not start					
7	Denmark	Rikke Haastrup Pedersen	Luganer	16	21					
7	Denmark	Torben Frandsen	Alcamo Vogt	12	12					
7	Denmark			36	49	85			9,000 €	2
8	Belgium	Philippe Le Jeune	Vigo D Arsouilles	4	8					
8	Belgium	Rik Hemeryck	Challenge van de Begijnakker	11	eliminated					
8	Belgium	Judy-Ann Melchior	As Cold as Ice Z	21	12					
8	Belgium	Jos Lansink	Valentina van´t Heike	17	retired					
8	Belgium					eliminated			6,000 €	1

(grey penalties points do not count for the team result)

== Grand Prix Spécial (dressage) ==
The Grand Prix Spécial was one of the most important dressage competitions at the 2011 CHIO Aachen. A Grand Prix Spécial is the competition with the highest definite level of dressage competitions.

It was held on Saturday, July 16, 2011 at 8:30 am. The Meggle AG was the sponsor of this competition.

	Rider	Horse	Score	prize money (€)
1	(Germany) Matthias Alexander Rath	Totilas	83.083 %	8,600 €
2	(Netherlands) Adelinde Cornelissen	Parzival	79.771 %	5,200 €
3	(Germany) Isabell Werth	El Santo NRW	78.292 %	3,900 €
4	(United Kingdom) Laura Bechtolsheimer	Mistral Hojris	77.229 %	2,600 €
5	(United States) Steffen Peters	Ravel	76.708 %	1,800 €

(top 5 of 30 competitors)

== CICO 3* (eventing) ==
The CICO 3* was the official eventing competition of Germany. It was held as two-day-event. The first part of this competition, the dressage phase, was held on Friday, July 15, 2011 at 8:30 am. The second phase, the show jumping phase, was held on the same day at 5:30 pm. The final phase, the cross country phase, was held on Saturday, July 16, 2011 at 10:30 am.

The sponsor of this competition was DHL.

=== team result ===
	Team	Rider	Horse	Converted dressage score	Show jumping score	Cross country score	Total score
1	Great Britain	William Fox-Pitt	Neuf des Coeurs	42.10	0.00	0.00	42.10
1	Great Britain	Mary King	Imperial Cavalier	42.90	0.00	0.00	42.90
1	Great Britain	Polly Stockton	Westwood Poser	48.10	0.00	1.60	49,70
1	Great Britain	Nicola Wilson	Opposition Buzz	49.80	0.00	0.00	49.80
1	Great Britain						134.70
2	New Zealand	Clarke Johnstone	Orient Express	43.50	0.00	1.60	45.10
2	New Zealand	Caroline Powell	Lenamore	44.60	0.00	2.80	47.40
2	New Zealand	Andrew Nicholson	Nereo	44.40	6.00	0.00	50.40
2	New Zealand	Jonathan Paget	Clifton Promise	52.50	0.00	0.00	52.50
2	New Zealand						142,90
3	Sweden	Sara Algotsson-Ostholt	Wega	42.50	5.00	0.00	47.50
3	Sweden	Christoffer Forsberg	Grafman	43.70	4.00	7.20	54.90
3	Sweden	Malin Petersen	Piccadilly Z	50.80	4.00	2.00	56.80
3	Sweden	Katrin Norling	Pandora Emm	57.50	0.00	9.20	66.70
3	Sweden						159.20
4	Australia	Lucinda Fredericks	Flying Finish	41.00	0.00	6.80	47.80
4	Australia	Clayton Fredericks	Bendigo	38.70	6.00	6.00	52.70
4	Australia	Sam Griffiths	Happy Times	37.10	16.00	7.60	60.70
4	Australia	Christopher Burton	Leilani	47.30	7.00	6.80	61.10
4	Australia						161.20
5	Germany	Andreas Dibowski	FRH Fantasia	43.10	0.00	0.80	43.90
5	Germany	Michael Jung	Leopin	44.00	4.00	0.00	48.00
5	Germany	Andreas Ostholt	Franco Jeas	43.80	6.00	30.80	43.80
5	Germany	Kai Rüder	Leprince des Bois	36.30	12.00	38.00	36.30
5	Germany						172.50
6	France	Didier Dhennin	Must des Sureaux	50.40	0.00	6.00	56.40
6	France	Pascal Leroy	Minos de Petra	50.20	3.00	4.40	57.60
6	France	Eddy Sans	Mayland de Brunel	57.30	4.00	47.20	108.50
6	France	Fabrice Lucas	Nero du Jardin	52.30	0.00	eliminated	eliminated
6	France						222.50
7	Belgium	Karin Donckers	Charizard	39.60	4.00	4.40	48.00
7	Belgium	Joris van Springel	Lully des Aulnes	51.90	4.00	38.80	94,70
7	Belgium	Sarah van Hasselt	Artic Fox Too	53.10	4.00	38.40	95.50
7	Belgium	Lara de Liedekerke	Nooney Blue	eliminated			eliminated
7	Belgium						238.20
8	Italy	Stefano Brecciaroli	Apollo van de Wendi Kurt Hoeve	34.80	5.00	1.60	41.40
8	Italy	Marco Biasia	Gandalf the Grey	58.80	4.00	23.20	86.00
8	Italy	Stella Benatti	Miss Wanted Fast	61.00	8.00	57.20	61.00
8	Italy						253.60

(grey penalties points do not count for the team result)

=== individual result ===
	Rider	Horse	Converted dressage score	Show jumping score	Cross country score	Total score
1	(Germany) Michael Jung	Sam FBW	32.30	0.00	2.40	34.70
2	(Italy) Stefano Brecciaroli	Apollo van de Wendi Kurt Hoeve	34.80	5.00	1.60	41.40
3	(United Kingdom) William Fox-Pitt	Neuf des Coeurs	42.10	0.00	0.00	42.10
4	(United Kingdom) Mary King	Imperial Cavalier	42.90	0.00	0.00	42.90
5	(Germany) Andreas Dibowski	FRH Fantasia	43.10	0.00	0.80	43.90

(Top 5 of 42 Competitors)

== Combined individual classification (four-in-hand-driving) ==
The combined individual classification is held separated from the team competition. Only the marathon phase was held together with the team competition.

The first part of this competition, the driven dressage, was held on Wednesday, May 13, 2011 at 1:00 pm. The second competition, the obstacle cone driving, was held on Friday, July 15, 2011 at 9:00 pm. The final phase, the marathon, was held on Saturday, July 16, 2011 at 2:30 pm.

	Driver	driven dressage score	obstacle cone driving score	marathon score	Total score	prize money (€)
1	(Australia) Boyd Exell	35.97	0.00	90.76	126.73	5,000 €
2	(Netherlands) IJsbrand Chardon	37.76	3.00	92.97	133.73	3,000 €
3	(United States) Chester Weber	37.25	0.00	100.51	137.76	2,250 €
4	(Germany) Georg von Stein	51.20	0.00	99.11	150.31	1,500 €
5	(Hungary) Zoltán Lazar	47.74	6.43	96.59	150.76	750 €
6	(Netherlands) Theo Timmerman	47.10	0.00	103.95	151.05	500 €
7	(Germany) Michael Brauchle	62.08	2.56	89.36	154.00	280 €
8	(Switzerland) Daniel Würgler	48.26	0.00	106.58	154.84	220 €
9	(Switzerland) Werner Ulrich	57.73	0.00	97.54	155.27	150 €
10	(Sweden) Fredrik Persson	49.15	0.00	107.76	156.91	150 €

(top 10 of 25 competitors)

== Best of Champions ==
The "Best of Champions" was a show jumping competition with two rounds and a joker obstacle after the second round. The height of the fences will be up to 1.50 meters. It will be held on Saturday, July 16, 2011 at 8:30 pm.

The competition was held in 2011 in a new mode without a horse change. Up to 2010 it was a special show jumping competition with a horse change of the four competitors.

Since 2011 the best six women and the best six men in the FEI World Ranking have the permission to start in this competition. Also the best placed German men and women in the World Ranking can start in this competition.

	Rider	Horse	Round 1	Round 2	Joker after Round 2	Total Penalties		prize money
	Rider	Horse	Round 1	Round 2	Joker after Round 2	Penalties	Time of the Round 2 (s)	prize money
1	(Germany) Janne Friederike Meyer	Holiday by Solitour	0	0	-4	-4	44.29	18,000 €
2	(Sweden) Rolf-Göran Bengtsson	Carusso	0	0	-4	-4	47.52	13,000 €
3	(Republic of Ireland) Denis Lynch	Lord Luis	4	0	-4	-4	41.53	8,000 €
4	(United States) Beezie Madden	Amadora	4	0	-4	-4	41.88	5,000 €
5	(United States) Laura Kraut	Dona Evita	0	0	0	0	41.97	4,000 €

(Top 5 of 14 Competitors)

== Grand Prix Freestyle (dressage) ==
The Grand Prix Freestyle (or Grand Prix Kür), also called the "Großer Dressurpreis von Aachen" (Grand dressage price of Aachen) was the final competition of the CDIO 5* at the 2011 CHIO Aachen.

A Grand Prix Freestyle is a Freestyle dressage competition. The level of this competition is at least the level of a Grand Prix de Dressage, but it can be higher than the level of a Grand Prix Spécial.

The Grand Prix Freestyle at the CDIO 5* (2011 CHIO Aachen) was held on Sunday, July 17, 2011 at 10:00 am. The Deutsche Bank was the sponsor of this competition.

	Rider	Horse	Score	prize money (€)
1	(Germany) Matthias Alexander Rath	Totilas	82.825 %	30,000 €
2	(United States) Steffen Peters	Ravel	82.000 %	18,000 €
3	(Netherlands) Adelinde Cornelissen	Parzival	81.775 %	13,500 €
4	(United Kingdom) Laura Bechtolsheimer	Mistral Hojris	79.825 %	9,000 €
5	(Germany) Christoph Koschel	Donnperignon	79.700 %	5,000 €

(top 5 of 15 competitors)

== Nations Cup of Germany (four-in-hand-driving) ==
The four-in-hand-driving nations cup was the official four-in-hand-driving competition of Germany.

The first part of this competition, the driven dressage, was held on Thursday, May 14, 2011 at 10:00 am. The second competition, the marathon, was held on Saturday, July 16, 2011 at 2:30 pm. The final phase, the obstacle cone driving, was held on Sunday, July 17, 2011 at 10:00 am.

	Team	Driver	driven dressage score	marathon score	obstacle cone driving score	Total score	prize money (€)
1	Netherlands	IJsbrand Chardon	38.91	92.97	0.00		
1	Netherlands	Koos de Ronde	59.52	104.08	3.00		
1	Netherlands	Theo Timmerman	45.82	103.95	3.00		
1	Netherlands					284.65	5,600 €
2	Germany	Michael Brauchle	55.42	89.36	6.91		
2	Germany	Christoph Sandmann	43.65	118.49	0.94		
2	Germany	Georg von Stein	48.51	99.11	5.55		
2	Germany					287.12	3,500 €
3	Switzerland	Felix Affrini	58.37	129.51	16.52		
3	Switzerland	Werner Ulrich	48.51	97.54	0.00		
3	Switzerland	Daniel Würgler	46.34	106.58	0.00		
3	Switzerland					298.97	2,500 €
4	Hungary	Jozsef Dobrovitz	52.35	102.57	16.73		
4	Hungary	Jozsef Dobrovitz junior	52.99	121.48	0.86		
4	Hungary	Zoltán Lazar	45.18	96.59	7.34		
4	Hungary					304.89	2,000 €
5	Sweden	Tomas Eriksson	53.25	101.34	2.22		
5	Sweden	Axel Olin	82.82	118.92	14.05		
5	Sweden	Fredrik Persson	49.92	107.76	10.34		
5	Sweden					324.83	1,800 €
6	United Kingdom	Georgina Hunt	54.27	228.61	15.28		
6	United Kingdom	Daniel Naprous	71.04	eliminated	21.67		
6	United Kingdom	Robert Wilkinson	57.22	140.30	12.63		
6	United Kingdom					508.31	1,600 €

(grey penalties points do not count for the team result)

== Großer Preis von Aachen (show jumping) ==
The "Großer Preis von Aachen", the show jumping Grand Prix of Aachen, was the mayor show jumping competition of the 2011 CHIO Aachen. It was held on Sunday, July 17, 2011 at 3:00 pm. The competition was a show jumping competition with two round and one jump-off, the height of the fences were up to 1.60 meters.

The main sponsor of the "Großer Preis von Aachen" was Rolex. The Grand Prix was endowed with 350,000 €.

	Rider	Horse	Round 1	Round 2		Jump-off		prize money
	Rider	Horse	Round 1	Penalties	Time (s)	Penalties	Time (s)	prize money
1	(Germany) Janne Friederike Meyer	Lambrasco	0	0	74.14			110,000 €
2	(France) Kevin Staut	Silvana	4	0	70.28			80,000 €
3	(Germany) Andreas Kreuzer	Chacco-Blue	0	4	70.77			50,000 €
4	(Portugal) Luciana Diniz	Winningmood	0	4	72.89			28,000 €
5	(Germany) Ludger Beerbaum	Gotha FRH	4	0	73.64			19,000 €

(Top 5 of 40 Competitors)

== Sport farewell of successful horses ==
At Saturday evening Jos Lansink and the audience in Aachen say goodbye to the Gold-winning horse of the 2006 World Equestrian Games in Aachen, the grey Holsteiner stallion Cumano.

Also another horse hero of the 2006 World Equestrian Games had to say goodbye at the 2011 Aachen. After the victory in the "Preis von Europa" Meredith Michaels-Beerbaum decided that the sport farewell of her dark bay Shutterfly. The Hanoverian gelding say goodbye to the audience in Aachen after the showjumping Grand Prix.

== Television / Live Video ==
The German TV stations (WDR, ARD and ZDF) had broadcast more than 15 hours from the 2011 CHIO Aachen, most of them live. Across Europe Eurosport broadcast a two-hour summary programme of the 2011 CHIO Aachen (Show jumping nations cup and show jumping Grand Prix).

Much of the competition are streamed live by the German IPTV-channel ClipMyHorse.
