= Karl-Heinz Kipp =

German businessman (1924–2017)

- Born: 12 February 1924; Alzey, Germany
- Died: 11 October 2017 (aged 93); Ascona, Switzerland
- Occupations: Founder, Massa AG
- Spouse: Hannelore Kipp
- Children: 2, including Ursula Bechtolsheimer-Kipp
- Relatives: Laura Bechtolsheimer (granddaughter)

Karl-Heinz Kipp (12 February 1924 – 11 October 2017) was a German billionaire, and founder of the Massa AG department store chain. He sold the business but kept the property, and had a large property portfolio. In 2017, Forbes estimated his net worth at US$4.9 billion.

== Career ==
Kipp began his career in 1948 selling clothes and opened his first Massa department store in 1965. At the beginning of the 1970s Kipp built the first large-scale consumer market on a "greenfield site". Within a few years, 30 more Massa supermarkets followed in southwestern Germany. In 1981, Kipp introduced financial shopping. In 1986, the Massa supermarkets shares went public. In 1987, Kipp sold his remaining shares but kept the real estate, which he rented to the retailer Metro AG.

=== Real estate ===
Kipp owned real estate in the U.S., including 950 Third Avenue in Manhattan.

In 1980 Kipp acquired the five-star Tschuggen Grand Hotel in Arosa. In addition, he owned five Swiss hotels and resorts in his "Tschuggen Hotel Group", including the Hotel Eden Roc in Ascona, the Carlton Hotel in St Moritz and the Tschuggen Grand Hotel in Arosa.

== Personal life ==
Kipp and his wife, Hannelore resided in Arosa, Switzerland.

His son, former Florida resident Ernst-Ludwig Kipp, died in 2003, leaving behind his seven children. His daughter Ursula married Dr Wilfried Bechtolsheimer and together they have three sons, Felix (a singer with the rock group Hey Negrita), Goetz, and Till (the founder of Arosa Capital Management and amateur racing driver who competes in the 2021 IMSA SportsCar Championship), and a daughter, Laura, an Olympic dressage rider.
