= Carl Hester =

British dressage rider (born 1967)

Carl Hester MBE
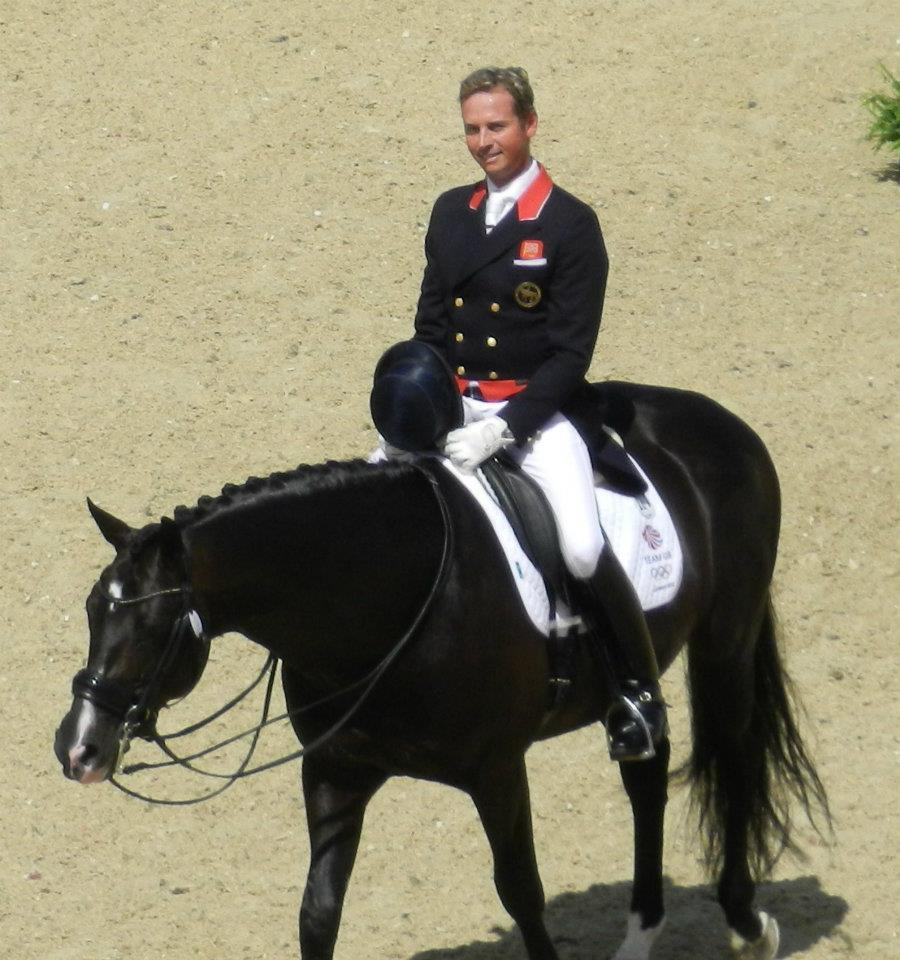
- Hester at the 2012 Summer Olympics

Personal information
- Born: 29 June 1967 (age 59) Cambridgeshire, England, United Kingdom
Medal record
Representing Great Britain
Olympic Games
Gold medal – first place	2012 London	Team Dressage
Silver medal – second place	2016 Rio de Janeiro	Team Dressage
Bronze medal – third place	2020 Tokyo	Team Dressage
Bronze medal – third place	2024 Paris	Team dressage
World Championships
Silver medal – second place	2010 Kentucky	Team dressage
Silver medal – second place	2014 Normandy	Team dressage
Silver medal – second place	2026 Aachen	Team dressage
Bronze medal – third place	2018 Tryon	Team dressage
European Championships
Gold medal – first place	2011 Rotterdam	Team dressage
Gold medal – first place	2023 Riesenbeck	Team dressage
Silver medal – second place	2009 Windsor	Team dressage
Silver medal – second place	2011 Rotterdam	Special dressage
Silver medal – second place	2011 Rotterdam	Freestyle dressage
Silver medal – second place	2015 Aachen	Team dressage
Silver medal – second place	2021 Hagen	Team dressage
Bronze medal – third place	2013 Herning	Team dressage
World Cup
Bronze medal – third place	2017 Omaha	Individual dressage

Carl Hester MBE (born 29 June 1967 in Cambridgeshire, England) is a British dressage rider competing at Olympic level. As of 8 August 2012, the Fédération Équestre Internationale (FEI) rank him 12th in the world riding Uthopia. In 2012, Hester formed part of the Great Britain Dressage team that won gold at the 2012 Summer Olympics.

== Early life and career ==
Hester was raised by his mother and stepfather. He lived on the Channel Island of Sark from the age of four, and was educated at Elizabeth College in Guernsey. His biological father is the actor Tony Smee.

Aged 19 he applied for a job with horses in the UK at The Fortune Centre of Riding Therapy and on the centre's skewbald mare, Jolly Dolly, he won the 1985 Young Dressage Rider Championship. Moving to Bourton-on-the-Hill he competed at the first Blenheim Horse Trials and won the Spillers Dressage with Jumping Championship. He next rode for Dr Wilfried Bechtolsheimer (father of Laura Bechtolsheimer) and in 1990 went to the World Championships on Rubelit von Unkenriff, the European Championships in 1991 and in 1992 the Barcelona Olympics on Georgioni. Hester became the youngest British rider ever to compete in an Olympic Games. He next went into a business partnership with Kate Carter at her yard at Stow-on-the-Wold until Carter decided to move for more space. Hester too moved to buy his own yard at Oaklebrook Mill, near Newent, Gloucestershire.

== 2011 European Dressage Championship ==
In 2011 Hester riding the horse Uthopia was part of the British team that won the team gold medal at the 2011 European Dressage Championship in Rotterdam. Hester also won individual silver medals in the Grand Prix Freestyle and Grand Prix Special.

As of 8 August 2012 the (FEI) ranked him 12th in the world riding Uthopia.

== 2012 Olympics ==
In 2012, Hester was selected with three others to represent the United Kingdom at the 2012 Summer Olympics in London in the Individual and Team Dressage events. The UK dressage team won the gold medal with Hester riding Uthopia.

Hester was appointed Member of the Order of the British Empire (MBE) in the 2013 New Year Honours for services to equestrianism.

== International Championship results ==
Results
Year	Event	Horse	Score	Placing	Notes
1990	World Equestrian Games	Rubelit v. Unkenruf		5th	Team
1990	World Equestrian Games	Rubelit v. Unkenruf		18th	Individual
1992	Olympic Games	Giorgione		7th	Team
1992	Olympic Games	Giorgione		16th	Individual
1999	European Championships	Legal Democrat		5th	Team
1999	European Championships	Legal Democrat		13th	Individual
2004	Olympic Games	Exquis Escapado		7th	Team
2004	Olympic Games	Exquis Escapado		13th	Individual
2005	World Cup Final	Exquis Escapado		10th	
2005	European Championships	Exquis Escapado		5th	Team
2005	European Championships	Exquis Escapado		6th	Individual
2009	European Championships	Liebling II	72.085%	2nd place, silver medalist(s)	Team
2009	European Championships	Liebling II	72.250%	10th	Individual Special
2009	European Championships	Liebling II	75.900%	10th	Individual Freestyle
2010	World Equestrian Games	Leibling II	72.128%	2nd place, silver medalist(s)	Team
2010	World Equestrian Games	Leibling II	69.417%	17th	Individual Special
2011	European Championships	Uthopia	82.568%	1st place, gold medalist(s)	Team
2011	European Championships	Uthopia	81.682%	2nd place, silver medalist(s)	Individual Special
2011	European Championships	Uthopia	84.179%	2nd place, silver medalist(s)	Individual Freestyle
2012	Olympic Games	Uthopia	77.720%	1st place, gold medalist(s)	Team
2012	Olympic Games	Uthopia	82.857%	5th	Individual
2013	European Championships	Uthopia	75.334%	3rd place, bronze medalist(s)	Team
2013	European Championships	Uthopia	72.250%	6th	Individual Special
2013	European Championships	Uthopia	81.696%	6th	Individual Freestyle
2014	World Equestrian Games	Nip Tuck	74.186%	2nd place, silver medalist(s)	Team
2014	World Equestrian Games	Nip Tuck	75.532%	12th	Individual Special
2014	World Equestrian Games	Nip Tuck	76.589%	12th	Individual Freestyle
2015	European Championships	Nip Tuck	75.400%	2nd place, silver medalist(s)	Team
2015	European Championships	Nip Tuck	77.003%	5th	Individual Special
2015	European Championships	Nip Tuck	79.571%	8th	Individual Freestyle
2016	Olympic Games	Nip Tuck	75.529%	2nd place, silver medalist(s)	Team
2016	Olympic Games	Nip Tuck	82.553%	7th	Individual
2017	World Cup Final	Nip Tuck	83.757%	3rd place, bronze medalist(s)	
2017	European Championships	Nip Tuck	74.900%	4th	Team
2017	European Championships	Nip Tuck	76.732%	5th	Individual Special
2017	European Championships	Nip Tuck	80.614%	4th	Individual Freestyle
2018	World Equestrian Games	Hawtins Delicato	77.283%	3rd place, bronze medalist(s)	Team
2018	World Equestrian Games	Hawtins Delicato	77.219%	9th	Individual Special
2019	European Championships	Hawtins Delicato	78.323%	4th	Team
2019	European Championships	Hawtins Delicato	77.508%	9th	Individual Special
2019	European Championships	Hawtins Delicato	70.732%	14th	Individual Freestyle

== Personal life ==
Hester is openly gay. In July 2024, it was announced a film was to be made about his life.

== See also ==
- 2012 Summer Olympics and Paralympics gold post boxes
