= Cathrine Rasmussen =

Norwegian equestrian

Personal information
- Nickname(s): Tine, Cathy
- Born: Cathrine Rasmussen; Mar 4, 1965 (age 61) Kristiansand, Norway
- Website: kleppenhus.com

Sport
- Country: Norway
- Sport: Dressage
- Club: Kleppenhus, Denmark
- Coached by: Peter Markne

Achievements and titles
- World finals: 2010 FEI World Equestrian Games

Cathrine Rasmussen (born 4 March 1965) is a Norwegian equestrian athlete and trainer and a businesswoman. She competed at the 2010 FEI World Equestrian Games and at the 2011 FEI European Championships in Rotterdam and at the 2013 European Dressage Championship in Herning.

== Biography ==
Catherine started riding at an age of three and has been always passionate about equestrian. She studied Humanities at the Indiana University Bloomington in the United States and started focusing on her professional equestrian career after graduation. She worked six years for Hasse Hoffmann in Denmark and moved later to Germany to train with Herbert Rehbein.

== Personal life ==
Catherine owns a stake in Rasmussengruppen, which is her family business. Her father is Einar Johan Rasmussen, a Norwegian engineer and ship owner. She lives both in Aarhus, Denmark and in her birthplace Kristiansand. She has two children and is fluent in English, Norwegian and Danish.
