= Lisbeth Seierskilde =

Danish dressage rider

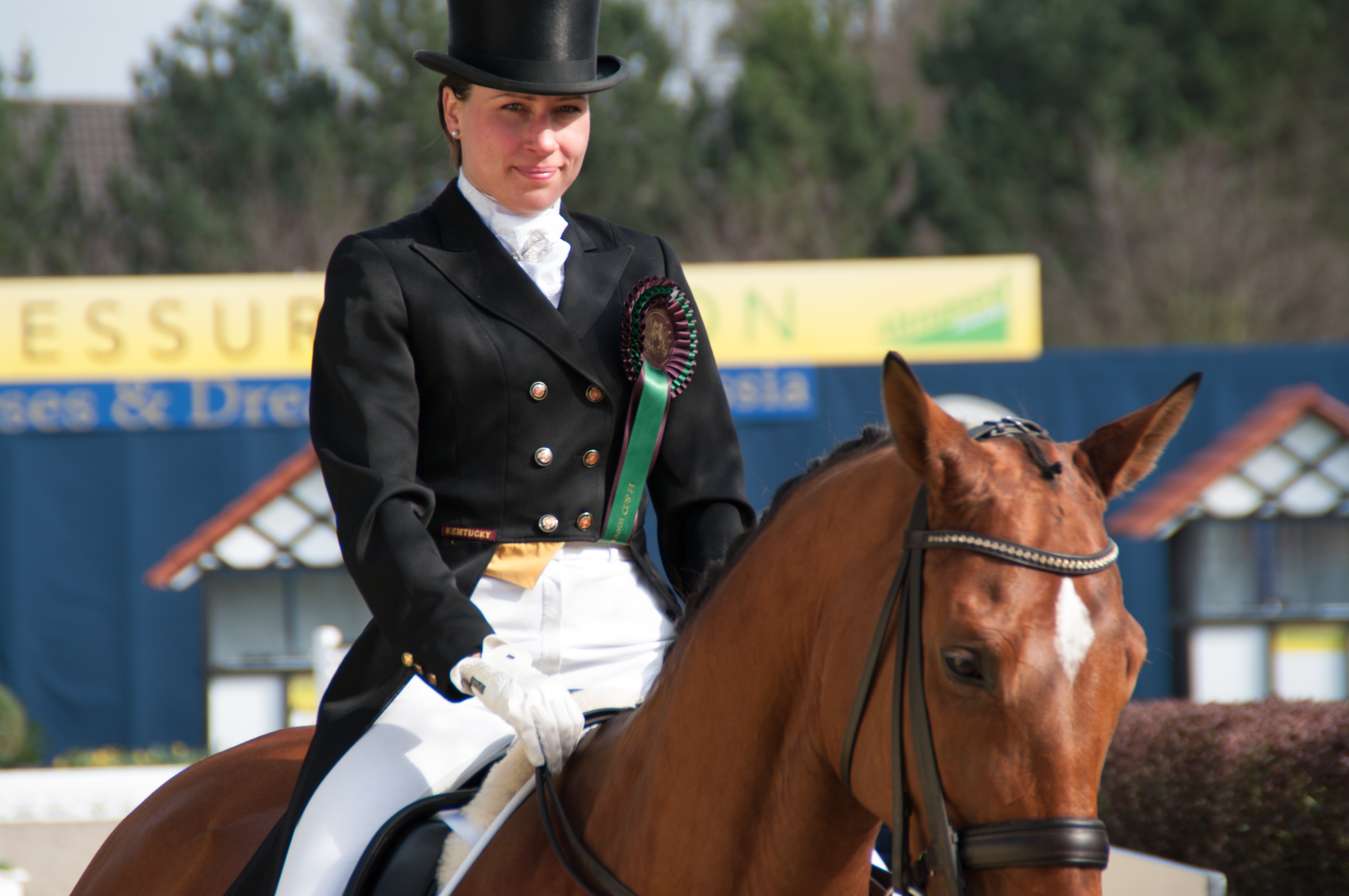
- Lisbeth Seierskilde (Copyright: Olaf Kosinsky / Wikipedia)

Personal information
- Born: 5 December 1985 (age 40) Roskilde, Denmark

Lisbeth Seierskilde (born 5 December 1985 in Roskilde, Denmark) is a Danish Olympic dressage rider. She competed at the 2012 Summer Olympics in London, where she placed 34th in the individual competition.

Seierskilde also competed at the 2011 European Championships in Rotterdam, where she finished 6th in the team, 14th in the freestyle and 15th in the special dressage competition.
