= Ursula Bechtolsheimer-Kipp =

German billionaire and businesswoman

- Born: Ursula Kipp; November 1951 (age 74)
- Occupation: Businesswoman
- Known for: Chairwoman of Tschuggen Hotel Group
- Spouse: Wilfried Bechtolsheimer
- Children: 4

Ursula Bechtolsheimer-Kipp (born November 1951) is a German-born billionaire, businesswomen and heiress.

Bechtolsheimer-Kipp is the only daughter of German retail tycoon Karl-Heinz Kipp, founder of the Massa department store chain. After her father died in October 2017, Ursula inherited much of his fortune.

Bechtolsheimer-Kipp was married to Dr Wilfried Bechtolsheimer. Together, they are estimated to be worth £1 billion by the Sunday Times Rich List.

== Early life ==
Bechtolsheimer-Kipp was born in Germany. She is one of two children born to Karl-Heinz Kipp and Hannelore Kipp. Her father, Karl-Heinz Kipp, was a self-made billionaire who made his fortune in retail and property. He is most famous for owning the Massa department store chain in Germany, which he founded in 1965 and sold two decades later in 1985.

Her brother, Ernst-Ludwig Kipp, died in 2003 leaving behind seven children.

== Career ==
=== Tschuggen Hotel Group ===
According to Forbes, Ursula took over the Tschuggen Hotel Group as its chairwoman in 2016, having been operationally involved in the company for many years prior.

Tschuggen Hotel Group is a luxury resort group and was set by Karl-Heinz Kipp in 1980. The group owns multiple resorts in Europe including the Tschuggen Grand Hotel in Arosa and the all-suite Carlton Hotel in St. Moritz, Switzerland.

=== Horse breeding ===
Ursula and her husband Wilfried own and run a horse training and breeding centre in Gloucestershire.

== Personal life ==
Dr Wilfried Bechtolsheimer died on April 8, 2020, aged 71 in Ascona, Switzerland.

Ursula and Wilfred have three sons and one daughter.

Her eldest son Felix is a member the gothic band, Curse of Lono. Another son, Gotz is an academic at the University of Pennsylvania.

Her youngest son, Till (b. 1982), a former racing driver, set up New York-based investment management company Arosa Capital Management.

Bechtolsheimer-Kipp's only daughter is British dressage rider Laura Tomlinson (née Bechtolsheimer), who won two medals at the 2012 Summer Olympics in London. Laura married English professional polo player Mark Tomlinson in a ceremony in 2013, which was attended by the Duke and Duchess of Cambridge and the Duke of Sussex.

Bechtolsheimer-Kipp moved her family to Gloucestershire from Germany in the late 1980s. According to Forbes, she currently resides in Switzerland.
