= Laura Tomlinson =

German-British dressage rider

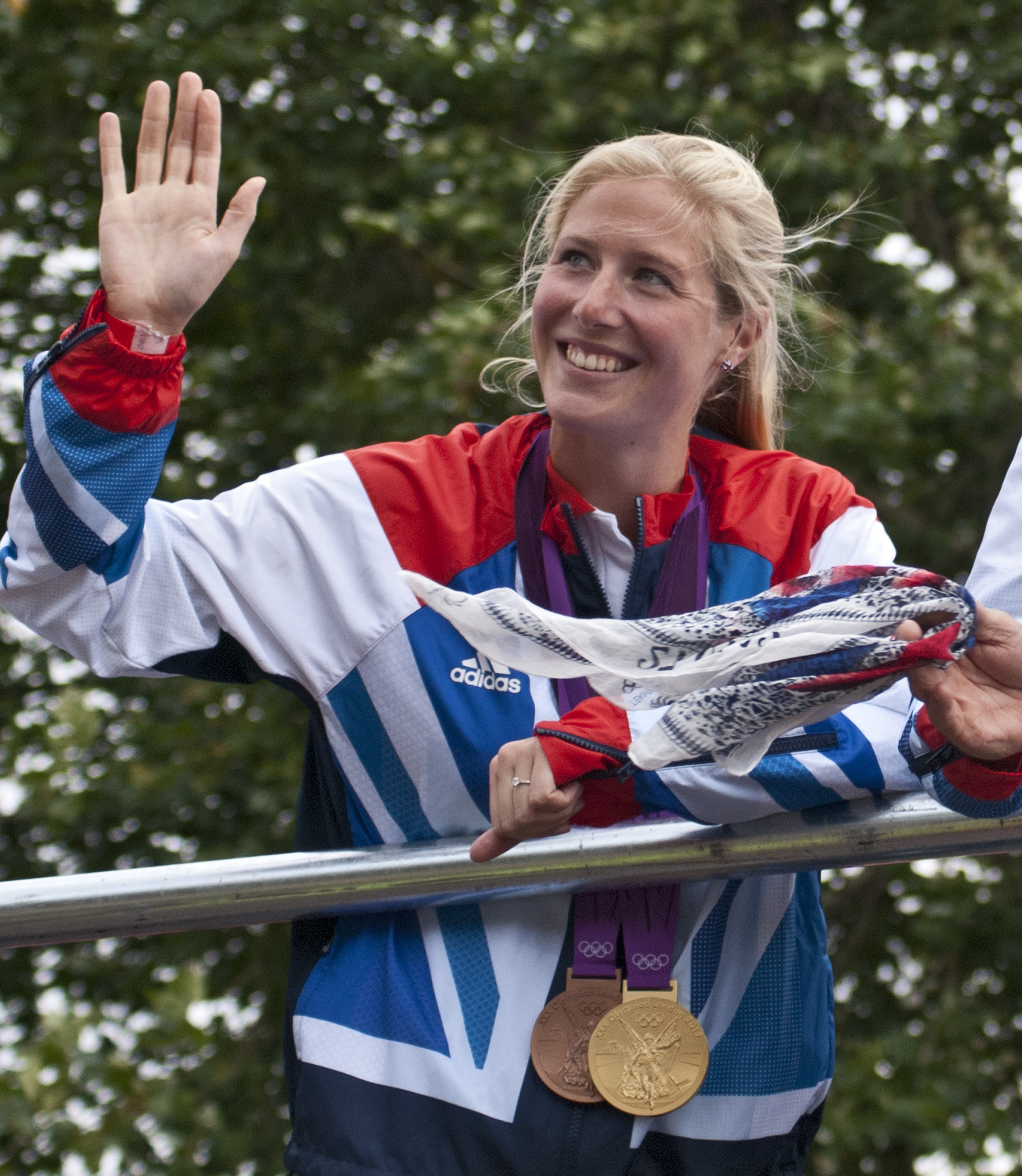
- Tomlinson in 2012

Medal record

Representing Great Britain

Equestrian – Dressage

Olympic Games
Gold medal – first place	2012 Olympic Games	Team Dressage (with Mistral Højris)
Bronze medal – third place	2012 Olympic Games	Individual Dressage (with Mistral Højris)

World Championships
Silver medal – second place	2010 Kentucky	Team – Grand Prix (with Mistral Højris)
Silver medal – second place	2010 Kentucky	Individual – Grand Prix Special (with Mistral Højris)
Silver medal – second place	2010 Kentucky	Individual – Grand Prix Freestyle (with Mistral Højris)

European Championships
Gold medal – first place	2011 Rotterdam	Team – Grand Prix (with Mistral Højris)
Silver medal – second place	2009 Windsor	Team – Grand Prix (with Mistral Højris)
Bronze medal – third place	2009 Windsor	Individual – Grand Prix Special (with Mistral Højris)
Bronze medal – third place	2011 Rotterdam	Individual – Grand Prix Special (with Mistral Højris)

Laura Tomlinson MBE (née Bechtolsheimer; born 31 January 1985, in Mainz, Germany) is a German-British dressage rider competing at Olympic level. As of 30 June 2012 the Fédération Équestre Internationale (FEI) ranked her 3rd in the world riding Mistral Højris and 36th on Andretti H. In that year, Tomlinson, riding Mistral Højris under her maiden name of Laura Bechtolsheimer, won two medals in the 2012 Summer Olympics in London; gold for Great Britain in the team dressage with Carl Hester and Charlotte Dujardin, the first ever Olympic team gold in the discipline for her country, and bronze in the individual dressage behind gold medalist and compatriot Dujardin.

== Early life ==
A granddaughter of the German billionaire property magnate Karl-Heinz Kipp who founded the Massa chain of department stores, Bechtolsheimer was born in Mainz, West Germany in 1985 to German parents Dr Wilfried Bechtolsheimer (who died in 2020), an entrepreneur and horse trainer, and Ursula Bechtolsheimer-Kipp. She has three brothers, Felix, a singer formerly with rock group Hey Negrita and now with Curse of Lono, Goetz, and Till, a businessman and amateur racing driver who competes in the 2021 IMSA SportsCar Championship. The family moved to Ampney St Peter in Gloucestershire when she was one.

== Career ==
Bechtolsheimer started riding aged three having been given a pony called Peacock for her birthday. She went on to compete in Pony Club eventing and won the National Championships of Independent Schools at Stonar School aged 12. Bechtolsheimer attended St Marys Calne school in Wiltshire, and started to concentrate on dressage aged 13. She was selected to ride at the Pony European Championship the following season, winning a team silver medal at her first major competition.

In 2005, Bechtolsheimer became the youngest British dressage champion at age 20, riding Douglas Dorsey. She graduated from Bristol University in 2007 with a BSc in Philosophy and Politics. She competed in the 2008 Olympic Games on Mistral Højris, gaining 18th place in the Individual Grand Prix Special and 6th place in the team event and was named as British Dressage's Rider of the Year.

At the 2010 FEI World Equestrian Games held in Kentucky, United States, Bechtolsheimer surpassed her personal best scores and gained three British International Grand Prix records with Mistral Højris getting 82.511% in the Grand Prix, 81.708% in the Grand Prix Special and 85.350% in the Grand Prix Freestyle, gaining her three silver medals, being beaten only by the celebrated Edward Gal and Totilas.

In 2012 Bechtolsheimer, who scored 80.550%, Carl Hester and Charlotte Dujardin won the gold medal in the Olympic team dressage event. She went on to win bronze in the individual event with her freestyle routine, set to music from The Lion King.

In 2016, she rode Rosalie B at the Olympia London International Horse Show. It was the first outing for the mare on British soil and followed a strong performance at the German CDI Oldenburg, where they won the grand prix special with 75.88%.

She was appointed Member of the Order of the British Empire (MBE) in the 2013 New Year Honours for services to equestrianism.

Outside of her dressage activities, Bechtolsheimer is a presenter for equine video website HorseHero.com and is considering a career in public relations and marketing.

== Notable horses ==
- Douglas Dorsey - 1991 Chestnut Hanoverian Gelding (Donnerhall x Salem)
  - 2004 European Young Riders Championships - Team Bronze Medal, Individual Fifth Place, Individual Fourth Place Freestyle
  - 2006 FEI World Cup Final - 14th Place
  - 2006 World Equestrian Games - Team Sixth Place, Individual 21st Place
- Mistral Højris - 1995 Chestnut Danish Warmblood Gelding (Michellino x Ibsen)
  - 2007 European Championships - Team Fifth Place, Individual 20th Place
  - 2008 Beijing Olympics - Team Fifth Place, Individual 17th Place
  - 2009 European Championships - Team Silver Medal, Individual Bronze Medal, Individual Fourth Place Freestyle
  - 2010 World Equestrian Games - Team Silver Medal, Individual Silver Medal, Individual Silver Medal Freestyle
  - 2011 European Championships - Team Gold Medal, Individual Silver Medal, Individual Fourth Place Freestyle
  - 2012 London Olympics - Team Gold Medal, Individual Bronze Medal

== Personal life ==
Bechtolsheimer married professional polo player Mark Tomlinson. The couple have three children (Annalisa, Wilfred and Hanni) and were expecting a fourth as of 2021.

== See also ==
- 2012 Summer Olympics and Paralympics gold post boxes
