= We Dreamed America =

- Directed by: Alex Walker
- Written by: Alex Walker; Felix Bechtolsheimer
- Produced by: Felix Bechtolsheimer
- Starring: Alabama 3 Kitty, Daisy and Lewis; Hey Negrita; Matt Ord; The Broken Family Band; The Barker Band
- Distributed by: Verve Pictures (UK)
- Release dates: 12 March 2008 (South by Southwest); 6 October 2008
- Running time: 48 minutes
- Country: United Kingdom

We Dreamed America is a 2008 documentary film directed by Alex Walker that explores facets of the British music scene. Examining the relationship and ongoing exchange between British and American roots music, the film looks at the British fascination with the most American of genres, country music. The film tells the stories of six British 'Americana' bands, while considering how country music fits into the British music industry.

== Cast ==
In addition to the British bands, the film features various musicians and music industry commentators including Tom McRae, Old Crow Medicine Show, Bob Harris, Little Feat, Sid Griffin and Guy Clark.

== Release ==
The film was released in the UK on DVD by Verve Pictures on 6 October 2008.
