= 2011 European Dressage Championships =

2011 European Dressage Championship
- Host city: Rotterdam, Netherlands
- Date(s): 21–25 August
- Level: Senior, Under 25
- Events: 3 Team, GP Special, GP Freestyle
- Records set: 1

The 2011 European Dressage Championship was held from August 17 and August 21, 2011 in Rotterdam, Netherlands.

It was the 25 edition of the European Dressage Championships, in the 24th time team medals were awarded.

== Organization ==
=== Before the event ===
At the 2008 FEI-General Assembly in Buenos Aires, the Netherlands was selected as the host country for the 2011 European Dressage Championship. Rotterdam, location of the annual Nations Cup horse show in Show Jumping and Dressage, was chosen as the location for the event.

It was the second time in European Dressage Championship history - after 1999 in Arnhem - that the Netherlands was chosen to hold this sports event.

=== Event and location ===
The European Dressage Championship was opened in late afternoon on Wednesday, August 17. The sport at the Championship had started on Wednesday morning. Parallel to the European Championships, a Youth Horse Show for riders up to 25 years of age and national dressage competitions was held.

At the end of the event there was a short final ceremony on Sunday (August 21, 2011 at 4:45 pm). Three days after the end of the European Dressage Championship the 2011 CHIO Rotterdam was held - this year without dressage.

The event was held in Kralingen, a district of Rotterdam, on the CHIO area between the Kralingseweg and the park Kralingse Bos.

== Competitions ==
=== General ===
As in years 1991, 1993, 2007 and 2009, in 2011 nine medals are awarded at the European Dressage Championship (three for the team competition, three in Grand Prix Spécial (individual) and also three in the Grand Prix Freestyle (individual).

At this European Championship a record number of participants started the Championship competitions. In the Grand Prix de Dressage 64 riders and 16 teams start. Each nation can start with a team of three or four riders, each rider with one horse.

=== Timetable ===
The first competition was the Team Grand Prix de Dressage. It was held on two days, on Wednesday and on Friday (August 17 and 19). All riders who participate at this Championship had to start in this competition. The results of three riders per team counts for the team result. After the Grand Prix de Dressage the team medals were awarded.

The Friday was a rest day for the horses which compete at the European Championship. The best 30 competitors of the Grand Prix de Dressage start in the Grand Prix Spécial, which was held on the Saturday.

The best 15 riders of the Grand Prix Spécial were allowed to participate in the Grand Prix Freestyle on Sunday. If more than three riders of a team are placed in the top 15 of the Grand Prix Spécial, only the three best-placed riders of this team are allowed to start in the Freestyle competition. In the event this happens the best-placed rider from a team with less than three riders in the top 15 will be moved up to the Grand Prix Freestyle.

=== Judges ===
The European Dressage Championships was assessed by seven judges.

- (Netherlands) Ghislain Fouarge (Ground Jury President)
- (Australia) Mary Seefried (Ground Jury Member)
- (Germany) Evi Eisenhardt (Ground Jury Member)
- (Mexico) Maribel Alonso de Quinzanos (Ground Jury Member)
- (Poland) Wojtek Markowski (Ground Jury Member)
- (United Kingdom) Stephen Clarke (Ground Jury Member)
- (France) Jean-Michel Roudier (Ground Jury Member)
- (United States) Gary Rockwell (Reserve judge)

== Results ==
=== Team result ===
The Team Gold Medal was awarded for the first time at European Dressage Championships by the British team. Great Britain, who was not credited with the 1963 Championships because of an FEI rule (see: European Dressage Championship), was in the lead after the end of the first day.

26-year-old British rider Charlotte Dujardin laid the foundation for the victory of the British team. Dujardin rode together with her horse Valegro in 2011, her first season on Grand Prix level. With a result of 78.830% the student of Carl Hester was in the lead in the individual ranking after day one.

On the second day Laura Bechtolsheimer and particularly Carl Hester, who led with his horse Uthopia in individual ranking after the Grand Prix de Dressage, can extend their lead in the team result.

On the second rank, with around 12 percent distance, the German team win the silver medal in the team ranking. The bronze medal was won by the Dutch team.

Final result

placing	team	riders and horses	percent
1	Great Britain	Emile Faurie; Elmegardens Marquis; Charlotte Dujardin; Valegro; Carl Hester; Uthopia; Laura Bechtolsheimer; Mistral Hojris	238.678 % (70.426 %) 78.830 % 82.568 % 77.280 %
2	Germany	Helen Langehanenberg; Damon Hill NRW; Christoph Koschel; Donnperignon; Isabell Werth; El Santo NRW; Matthias Alexander Rath; Totilas	226.110 % (71.079 %) 71.444 % 75.213 % 79.453 %
3	Netherlands	Sander Marijnissen; Moedwill; Hans Peter Minderhoud; Nadine; Edward Gal; Sisther de Jeu; Adelinde Cornelissen; Parzival	222.645 % 70.578 % 70.912 % (70.517 %) 81.155 %
4	Sweden	Rose Mathisen; Bocelli; Cecilia Dorselius; Lennox; Tinne Vilhelmson-Silfvén; Favourit; Patrik Kittel; Scandic	214.437 % 68.024 & (66.763 %) 69.939 % 76.474 %
5	Spain	Beatriz Ferrer-Salat; Faberge; Claudio Castilla Ruiz; Jade de MV; Juan Manuel Muñoz Díaz; Fuego de Cardenas; Jordi Domingo Coll; Prestige	211.580 % 67.842 % (66.900 %) 73.404 % 70.334 %

=== Individual result (Grand Prix Spécial) ===
Individual dressage at the 2011 European Dressage Championships

Final result

placing	rider	horse	percent
1	(Netherlands) Adelinde Cornelissen	Parzival	82.113 %
2	(United Kingdom) Carl Hester	Uthopia	81.682%
3	(United Kingdom) Laura Bechtolsheimer	Mistral Hojris	79.256%
4	(Germany) Matthias Alexander Rath	Totilas	77.039%
5	(Sweden) Patrik Kittel	Scandic	76.771%
6	(United Kingdom) Charlotte Dujardin	Valegro	76.548%
7	(Germany) Isabell Werth	El Santo NRW	76.533%
8	(Germany) Helen Langehanenberg	Damon Hill NRW	75.283%

=== Individual result (Grand Prix Freestyle) ===
Individual dressage at the 2011 European Dressage Championships

Final result

placing	rider	horse	percent
1	(Netherlands) Adelinde Cornelissen	Parzival	88.839%
2	(United Kingdom) Carl Hester	Uthopia	84.179%
3	(Sweden) Patrik Kittel	Scandic	83.429%
4	(United Kingdom) Laura Bechtolsheimer	Mistral Hojris	83.018%
5	(Germany) Matthias Alexander Rath	Totilas	81.696%
6	(Spain) Juan Manuel Muñoz Díaz	Fuego	80.982%
7	(Germany) Isabell Werth	El Santo NRW	80.536%
8	(Germany) Helen Langehanenberg	Damon Hill NRW	80.446%

=== Side competitions ===
During the European Championships, there was also an international show class for Grand Prix riders under the age of 25. They were both won by Kristina Bröring-Sprehe.

Event	Gold		Silver		Bronze	
Under 25
Intermediate II	Kristina Bröring-Sprehe (Germany) riding Desperados FRH	75.421	Morgan Barbancon (Spain) riding Painted Black	74.868	Diederik van Silfhout (Netherlands) riding Luxform's Popeye	71.553
Grand Prix 16-25	Kristina Bröring-Sprehe (Germany) riding Desperados FRH	75.628	Morgan Barbancon (Spain) riding Painted Black	73.349	Stella-Charlott Roth (Germany) riding Diva Royal	72.558

== More informations ==
The collection and data communication of the result is performed, as already at the 2010 FEI World Equestrian Games, by Dutch company Sport Computer Graphics (SCG).

Before the Grand Prix de Dressage and the Grand Prix Spécial a test rider ("guinea pig") rides to test the systems. This task is performed by Canadian dressage rider Ashley Holzer with her horse Popart.
