= Stephanie Rhodes-Bosch =

Canadian eventer

Personal information
- Born: 17 July 1988 (age 37) Edmonton, Alberta, Canada
Medal record
Equestrian
Representing Canada
World Championships
Silver medal – second place	2010 Kentucky	Team eventing

Stephanie "Steph" Rhodes-Bosch (born 17 July 1988) is a Canadian eventing rider. She was a part of the Canadian team that won a silver medal in eventing at the 2010 World Equestrian Games. At the same event, she placed 9th individually riding Port Authority, a horse with whom she previously won an individual bronze at the 2008 North American Young Riders Championships.
