= Einar Normann Rasmussen =

Norwegian ship-owner and politician

- Born: 22 August 1907; Vestre Moland Municipality, Norway
- Died: 14 August 1975 (aged 67)
- Occupation: Ship owner
- Children: Einar Johan Rasmussen
- Awards: Order of the Three Stars

Einar Normann Rasmussen (22 August 1907 – 14 August 1975) was a Norwegian ship-owner and politician for the Liberal Party.

He was born in Vestre Moland Municipality as a son of a shipmaster, but moved to Kristiansand where he started his career as an office clerk in Christianssands Skibsassuranceforening from 1923 to 1936. In 1931 he took the examen artium as a privata candidate at Kristiansand Cathedral School. From 1936 he was a ship-owner.

He served as a deputy representative to the Parliament of Norway from Vest-Agder during the terms 1954–1957 and 1958–1961. In total he met during 31 days of parliamentary session. He was a member of Kristiansand city council from 1945 to 1955.

He was decorated with the Order of the Three Stars.
