= Einar Johan Rasmussen =

Norwegian engineer and ship owner (born 1937)

- Born: 30 December 1937 (age 87); Kristiansand, Norway
- Occupation(s): Ships engineer Ship owner
- Children: Cathrine Rasmussen
- Parent: Einar Normann Rasmussen
- Awards: Order of St. Olav

Einar Johan Rasmussen (born 30 December 1937) is a Norwegian engineer and ship owner.

Rasmussen was born in Kristiansand to ship owner Einar Normann Rasmussen and Jenny Alvilde Tjøm. He graduated as ships engineer from the Norwegian Institute of Technology in 1960. He was a board member of the family shipping company Rasmussengruppen from 1958, and took over as CEO after his father's death in 1975.The company gradually shifted from shipping to offshore.

Rasmussen was decorated Knight, First Class of the Order of St. Olav in 1999, and is Commander of the Order of the Polar Star.
