= Claudio Castilla Ruiz =

Spanish dressage rider

Personal information
- Born: 30 May 1983 (age 41); Jerez de la Frontera, Spain

Claudio Castilla Ruiz (born 30 May 1983 run Jerez de la Frontera, Spain) is a Spanish Olympic dressage rider. He competed at the 2016 Summer Olympics in Rio de Janeiro, where he finished 38th in the individual and 7th in the team competition.

Castilla Ruiz also competed at the 2010 World Equestrian Games and at four editions of European Dressage Championships (in 2009, 2011, 2017 and 2019). His best result came at the 2011 Europeans, when he placed 5th in the team dressage competition.

== Dressage results ==
=== Olympic Games ===
Event	Team	Individual	Horse
(Brazil) 2016 Rio de Janeiro	7th	38th	Alcaide
(France) 2024 Paris	13th	36th	Hi-Rico Do Sobral

=== World Championships ===
Event	Team	Individual	Freestyle	Horse
(United States) 2010 Lexington	6th	34th	—	Jade de MV
(United States) 2018 Tryon	6th	13th	—	Alcaide

=== European Championships ===
Event	Team	Individual	Freestyle	Horse
(United Kingdom) 2009 Windsor	7th	35th	—	Jade de MV
(Netherlands) 2011 Rotterdam	5th	37th	—	Jade de MV
(Sweden) 2017 Gothenburg	7th	28th	—	Alcaide
(Netherlands) 2019 Rotterdam	6th	16th	12th	Alcaide

=== World Cup ===
==== Western European League ====
Season	Points	Rank
2018-19	17	30th
2019-20	17	36th

- Q - denotes qualification for the World Cup Final

==== Western European League podiums ====
2 podiums (0 gold, 2 silver, 0 bronze)

Season	Place	Placement	Horse
2018-19	(Spain) Madrid	2nd	Alcaide
2019-20	(Spain) Madrid	2nd	Alcaide
