= The Fortune Centre of Riding Therapy =

The Fortune Centre of Riding Therapy (FCRT) provides education and therapy through horses. It is a UK based registered charity serving as Independent Specialist Provision for young horse enthusiasts with Learning Difficulties and Disabilities whose educational needs post-16 are met by an individual learning programme.

The Fortune Centre of Riding Therapy operates a residential “Further Education Through Horsemastership” (FETH) Course. FETH course students develop the skills that they require to lead more independent lives. The use and involvement of horses in the education process is at the core of its unique work. Teaching and learning is through transferable skills from the horse-based environment to skills of daily living.

The Fortune Centre of Riding Therapy also provides non-residential Equine Facilitated Education and Therapy for young children and older adults with a variety of disabilities.

Students are funded by the UK government through their Local Authority. Capital income and expenditure is dependent on charitable donations.

The Fortune Centre of Riding Therapy's work is spread across three locations in The New Forest, Hampshire, England.

== History ==
The organisation was founded in 1976. It has received coverage in the national press on several occasions
