= Curse of Lono =

British alternative rock band

- Origin: London
- Genres: Alternative rock; Folk; Americana
- Years active: 2015–present
- Label: Submarine Cat Records
- Spinoff of: Hey Negrita
- Members: Felix Bechtolsheimer; Neil Findlay; Joe Hazell; Dani Ruiz Hernandez; Charis Anderson
- Website: www.curseoflonoband.com

Curse of Lono is an English alternative rock band based in London and signed to Submarine Cat Records. They have released one EP and two studio albums. Their most recent album, As I Fell, peaked at number 10 on the Official Americana Albums Chart and at number 15 on the Official Independent Album Breakers Chart in the U.K. The band has also been the subject of two short films, Saturday Night: A Film Of Four Songs and Somewhere In Their Heads, both of which have won awards and appeared at numerous film festivals.

== History ==
After the dissolution of their band, Hey Negrita, Felix Bechtolsheimer (lead vocals and guitar) and Neil Findlay (drums) formed Curse of Lono in 2015. The band's name comes from the title of Hunter S. Thompson's 1983 book, The Curse of Lono. Bechtolsheimer and Findlay soon added Joe Hazell (lead guitar), Dani Ruiz Hernandez (keyboards), and Charis Anderson (bass - ex Poussez Posse) to round out the group. They released their debut eponymous EP in October 2016 through Submarine Cat Records. The collection was produced by Oli Bayston. In support of the EP, the band went on a European tour with Uncle Lucius. Interconnected music videos for the EP's four songs were compiled in a short film called, Saturday Night: A Film Of Four Songs, which was released in conjunction with the EP. The film would go on to appear in numerous film festivals and win the Best Music Video awards for both the Los Angeles Independent Film Festival and the London Independent Film Festival.

In February 2017, the band premiered their lead single, "Pick Up The Pieces," off their debut studio album, Severed. That album was released in April 2017. That year, the band played sold-out shows in various London venues including The Islington, Servant Jazz Quarters, and The Water Rats. The proceeds from the latter show were donated to the cancer fund of the late Barry Marshall-Everitt, a prominent London music figure. The band also played a number of UK music festivals in 2017, including the Isle of Wight Festival, Standon Calling, Wychwood Festival, and others. Later in the year, Curse of Lono went on a European tour with Chuck Prophet and The Mission Express and a smaller UK tour with Low Cut Connie.

In May 2018, the band was the subject of a documentary short called Somewhere In Their Heads directed by Gregg Houston. The film chronicled the making of their second studio album (As I Fell) which was recorded at both Flesh & Bone in Hackney, London and Rancho V in Joshua Tree, California. The group released their first single off the album, "Valentine," that same month. The short film again made the rounds at various festivals, earning the Best Documentary Short Award at the Hollywood Sun Awards, the Feel the Reel International Film Festival in Glasgow, the LA Edge Film Festival, and numerous others. Early in the year, Curse of Lono toured with Steve Earle and Southside Johnny and the Asbury Jukes, and went on their first UK headlining tour. As I Fell was released in August 2018, and the band went on a mini-tour of Scandinavia with David Ramirez followed by a second UK headline tour in November in support. The album peaked at number 10 on the Official Americana Albums Chart and at number 15 on the Official Independent Album Breakers Chart.

In January 2019, the band was awarded the Bob Harris Emerging Artist Award at the UK Americana Awards at Hackney Empire. The group also performed at South by Southwest in March 2019. For Record Store Day on 13 April 2019, the group released the live album 4am and Counting which was produced by Liam Watson at Toe Rag Studios. The album features "mellow, rootsier" versions of tracks off the band's first two albums. In May 2019, Curse Of Lono embarked on a 12-date tour of the UK with Samantha Fish.

In 2021, Curse of Lono released their third studio album, People In Cars. John Apice of Americana Highways praised the record, noting that several tracks require deep immersion and may not fully resonate upon the first listen. While he highlighted the expressive lyricism, he expressed disapproval of the album cover, finding it incongruous with the music.

== Discography ==
=== Studio albums ===
List of studio albums with selected album details and chart history
| Title | Details | Peak chart positions |
| Title | Details | UK Amer. |
|---|---|---|
| Severed | Released: 7 April 2017 (UK); Label: Submarine Cat; Formats: Digital download, CD, LP | — |
| As I Fell | Released: 17 August 2018 (UK); Label: Submarine Cat; Formats: Digital download, CD, LP | 10 |
| People In Cars | Released: 26 November 2021 (UK); Label: Submarine Cat; Formats: Vinyl, LP | — |
"—" denotes a title that did not chart, or was not released in that territory.

=== EPs ===
List of EPs with selected album details
| Title | Details |
|---|---|
| Curse of Lono | Released: 14 October 2016 (UK); Label: Submarine Cat; Formats: Digital download, LP, CD |

=== Live albums ===
List of EPs with selected album details
| Title | Details |
|---|---|
| 4am and Counting | Release date: 13 April 2019 (UK); Label: Submarine Cat; Formats: LP |

=== Singles ===
List of singles showing year released and album name
| Title | Year | Album |
|---|---|---|
| "He Takes My Place" | 2016 | Curse of Lono EP |
| "Pick up the Pieces" | 2017 | Severed |
| "Send for the Whisky" | 2017 | Severed |
| "Valentine" | 2018 | As I Fell |
| "Way to Mars" | 2018 | As I Fell |
| "No Trouble" | 2019 | As I Fell |
