= Sander Marijnissen =

Dutch dressage rider

Personal information
- Full name: Sander Marijnissen
- Born: October 25, 1970 (age 55)
Medal record
Equestrian
Representing the Netherlands
European Championships
Bronze medal – third place	2011 Rotterdam	Team dressage

Sander Marijnissen (born 25 October 1970) is a Dutch dressage rider. He won a team bronze medal at the 2011 European Dressage Championships aboard Moedwil.
