= Hey Negrita (band) =

English country blues band

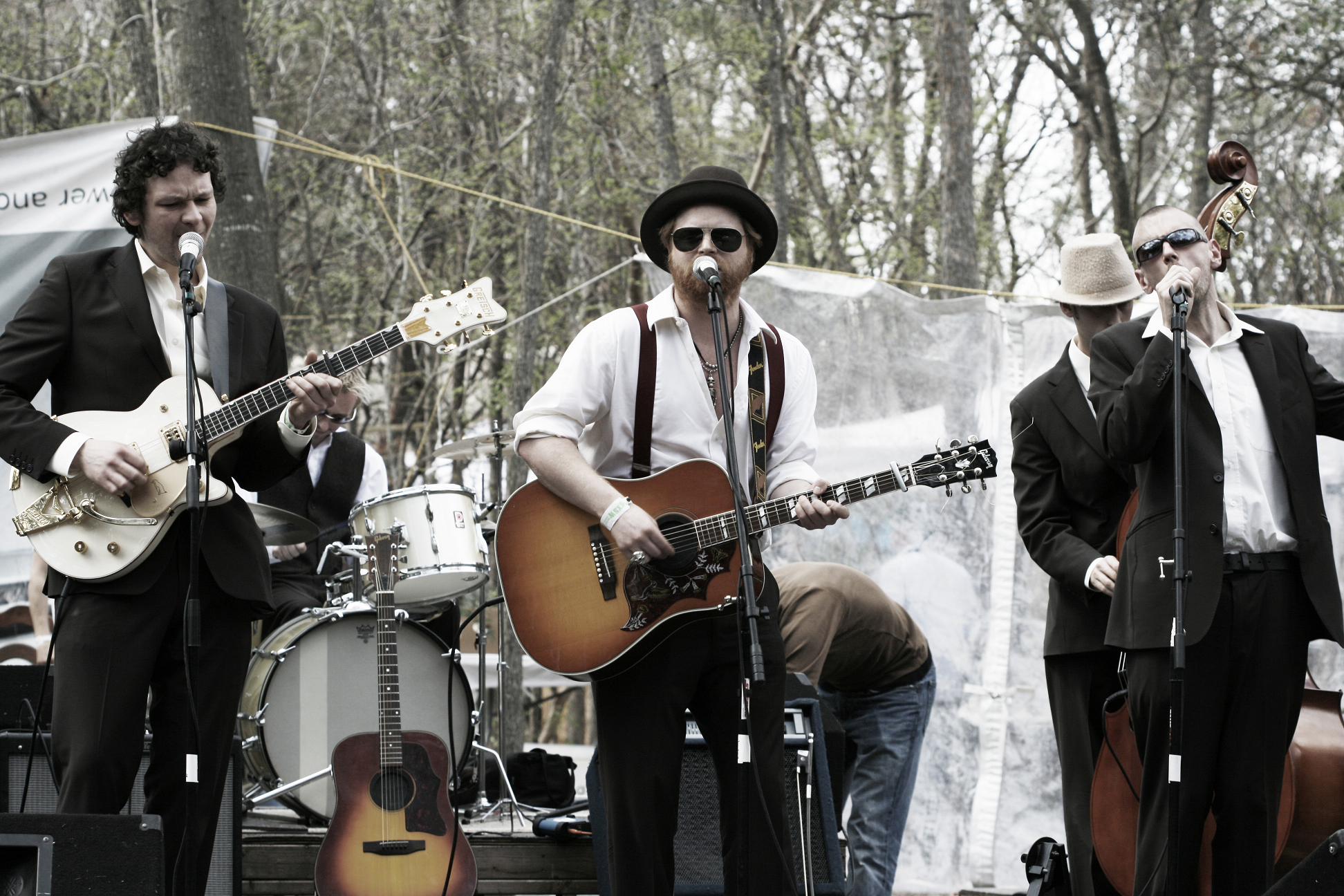
- Hey Negrita at the 2008 SXSW festival (from left to right: Ord, Findlay, Bechtolsheimer, Sandy, Greener)

Background information
- Origin: London, England
- Genres: Country, blues, alternative country, folk, southern rock, folk rock
- Years active: 2002–2009
- Label: Fat Fox Records
- Past members: Felix Bechtolsheimer; Matthew Ord; William Greener; Neil Findlay; Paul Sandy; Paul Tkachenko; Hugo Heimann; Gus Glenn
- Website: www.heynegrita.com

Hey Negrita were an English country blues band formed in London in 2002. They were named after the song "Hey Negrita", from the 1976 album Black and Blue by the Rolling Stones. The band, which consisted of Felix Bechtolsheimer (guitar and vocals), Matthew Ord (guitar and vocals), Neil Findlay (drums), William Greener (harmonica and vocals), Paul Sandy (bass) and Paul Tkachenko (accordion, banjo, keyboards, mandolin, sousaphone and vocals), released four studio albums and various singles.

The lineup, which included Hugo Heimann for the first two albums, underwent several changes. They were the subject of a Channel 4 music documentary broadcast in August 2006 and featured in the music documentary We Dreamed America in 2008. Hey Negrita undertook four tours to the United States, and supported Alabama 3 on a UK acoustic tour. They also toured UK prisons in 2006 in support of RAPt (Rehabilitation for Addicted Prisoners Trust).

Hey Negrita appeared at various music festivals, including SXSW in Austin, Texas, Bergenfest in Norway, Canadian Music Week in Canada and Glastonbury in the UK. Lead singer Bechtolsheimer is the older brother of Olympic equestrian Laura Bechtolsheimer. The band were linked with the "New British Roots Movement" and The Financial Times described Bechtolsheimer, the group's founder and songwriter, as "the driving force behind" a "loose coalition of bands in the same sector."

== History ==
=== Formation and We Are Catfish (2002–2005) ===
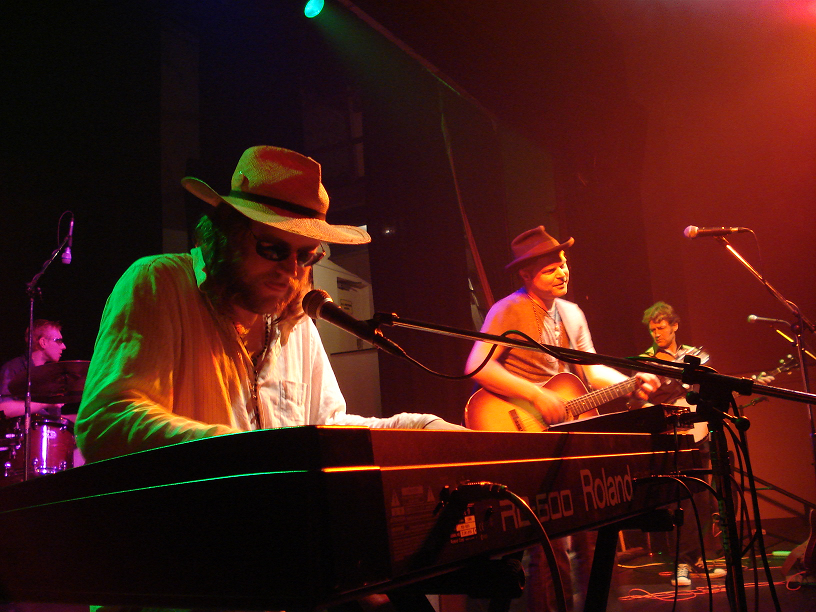
Hey Negrita members Findley, Heimann, Bechtolsheimer and Glenn performing at the Tenby Blues Festival in 2006

Felix Bechtolsheimer started Hey Negrita in London in 2002 with Hugo Heimann following Bechtolsheimer's return from Florida, where he had spent a year undergoing treatment for heroin addiction, during which he wrote much of the band's early material. In 2004 Bechtolsheimer and Heimann recorded their first full-length album, The Minnesota Method, with Heimann playing all instruments except lead vocals and several acoustic guitar parts. The tracks "Beaujolais Villages" and "Kathmandu" were both played by Bob Harris on BBC Radio 2 but the album was never released.

In 2005 the duo released the 7" single "Devil in My Shoes" on independent label Fat Fox Records (distributed by Pinnacle), followed by their full-length debut album, We Are Catfish. They also added drummer Neil Findlay (who played on the song "Beaujolais Villages") to the line-up. They released three singles from the album, "Devil in My Shoes", "Old Britannia", the double A-side "Motorboat/Losing You" plus a limited edition 12" vinyl "Hey Negrita the Remixes" featuring a Nick Franglen Of Lemon Jelly Remix of "Losing You" and a Chris Coco Remix of "One Mississippi". The remixes received international airplay after appearing on several compilations including Café Del Mar 13, Hed Kandi's Serve Chilled and The Best Songs Of Ibiza's Sunset Collection.

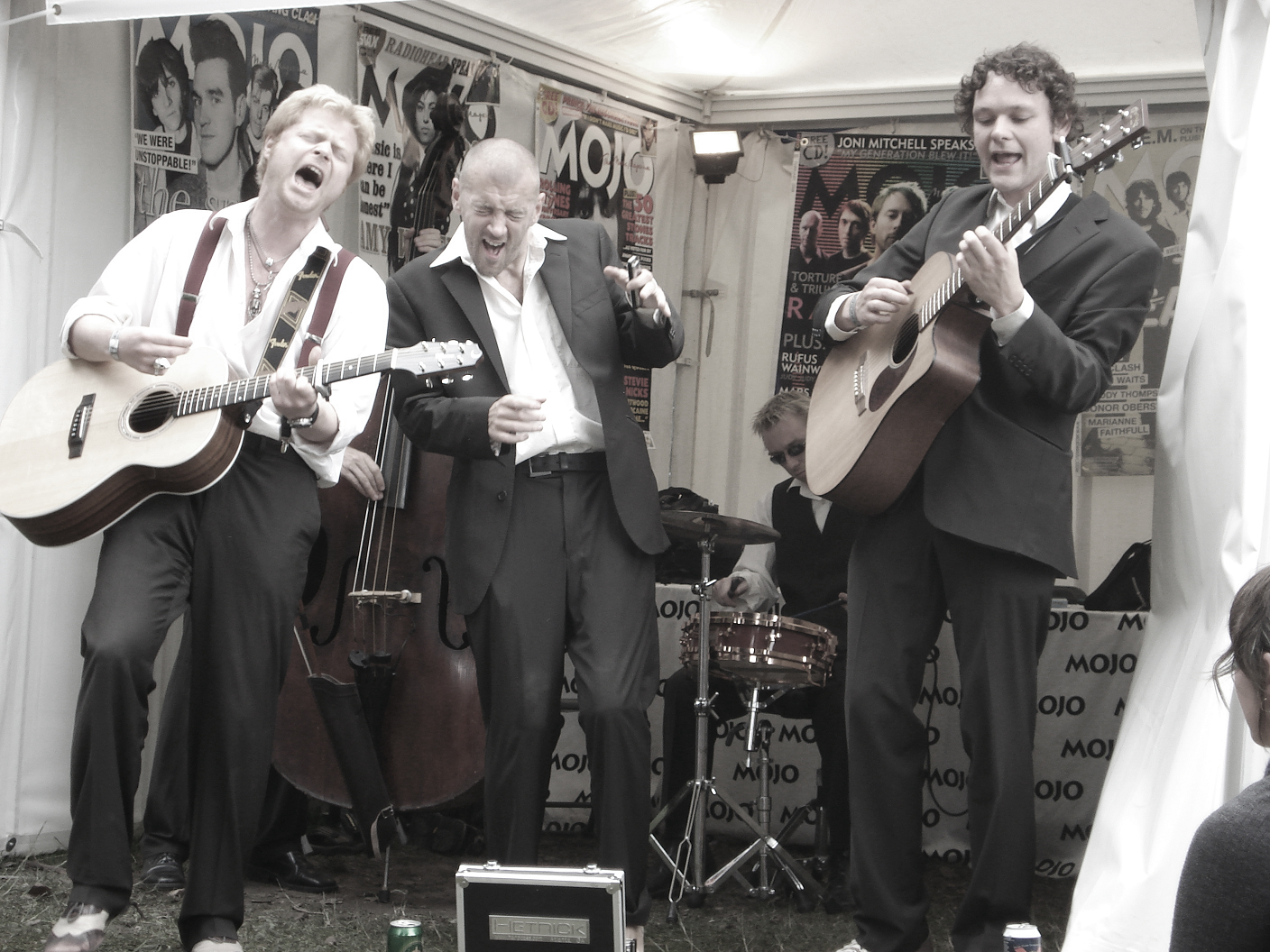
Hey Negrita busking at Cambridge Folk Festival in 2008

In March 2006 the band embarked on their first US tour, which included a performance at the SXSW Music Festival in Austin. Footage from the tour, filmed and edited by Alex Walker, was aired on Channel 4 in August that year as part of their Fourplay series.

=== The Buzz Above (2006) ===
In 2006 Hey Negrita released their second studio album, The Buzz Above, and three singles, "Can't Walk Away", "Abandon Ship" and "Nine to Five". They also added multi-instrumentalist Gus Glenn (guitar, lap steel, banjo and vocals) to their line-up. That summer the band appeared at several festivals including Cambridge Folk Festival, Secret Garden Party, Lovebox and Standon Calling. Later that year the band supported Alabama 3 on their 19-date UK acoustic tour and returned to the US to support Tony Joe White on his US West Coast tour.

=== Prison gigs and association with RAPt (2006–2007) ===
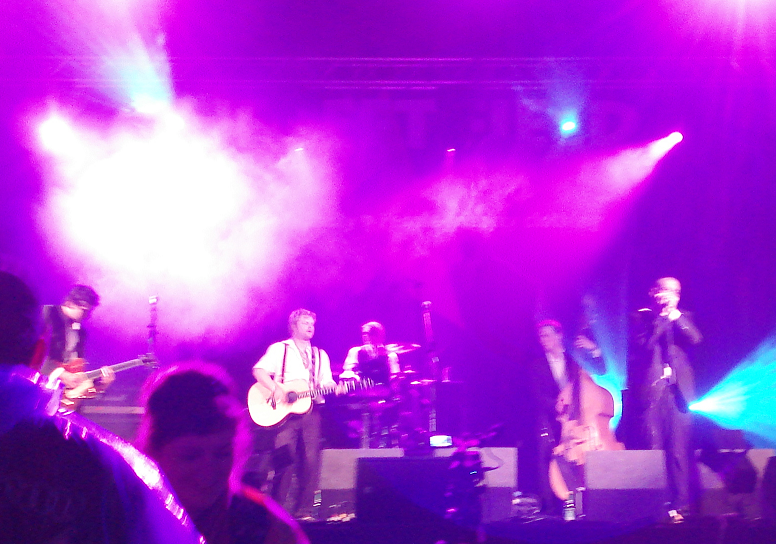
Hey Negrita performing at Glastonbury Festival in 2008

Following several articles on Bechtolsheimer's struggles with heroin addiction, the band was invited to perform in a number of prisons, including Brixton, Wandsworth, Holloway, Send and Woodhill Maximum Security, to promote the charity RAPt, who provide drug and alcohol rehabilitation within UK prisons. Coverage for these performances included a segment on Sky News and an interview with Bechtolsheimer on Channel Five News.

=== You Can Kick and new line-up (2007–2008) ===
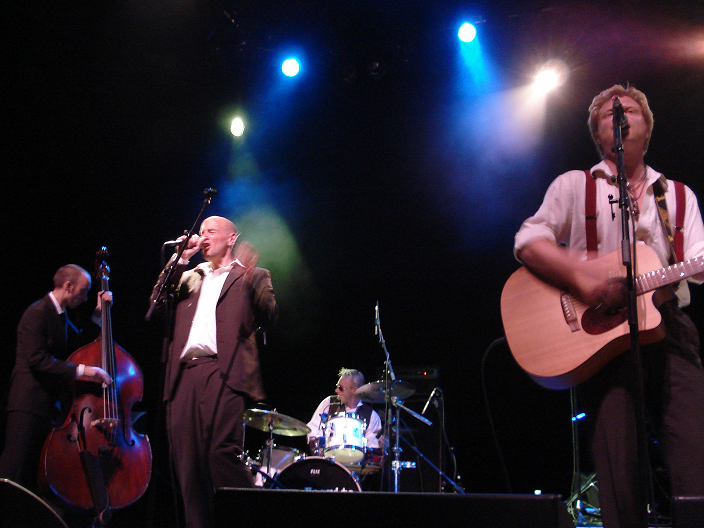
Hey Negrita at the Shepherd's Bush Empire

In November 2006 Hugo Heimann and Gus Glenn left the band and were replaced by Matthew Ord (guitar and vocals), Paul Sandy (bass) and William Greener, performing under the stage name Captain Bliss (harmonica and vocals). In 2008 the band released their third studio album, You Can Kick, on Fat Fox Records (now distributed by Universal). The album was recorded with producer Steve Ancliffe and mixed by Bechtolsheimer and Greg Duffin at Cowboy Technical Services in Brooklyn, NY.

That year the band also released the singles "Rope" (which included an Alabama 3 Remix as the B-side) and the double A-side "Room Service/The Last Thing That I Do". They appeared at various festivals including Glastonbury, Bestival, Cambridge Folk Festival, Rhythm Festival, Secret Garden Party, Larmer Tree, End Of The Road, Lovebox, Beautiful Days, Standon Calling, Latitude and SXSW. Paul Tkachenko, who performed all brass instruments on "The Last Thing That I Do", also joined the band's touring line-up, playing accordion, banjo, keyboards, mandolin, sousaphone and vocals.

The band supported The Beach Boys in Germany and Australian folk rock band The Waifs at London's Shepherd's Bush Empire as well as embarking on a 16-date UK headline tour with support from Manchester-based alternative folk band The Travelling Band.

=== We Dreamed America (2008) ===
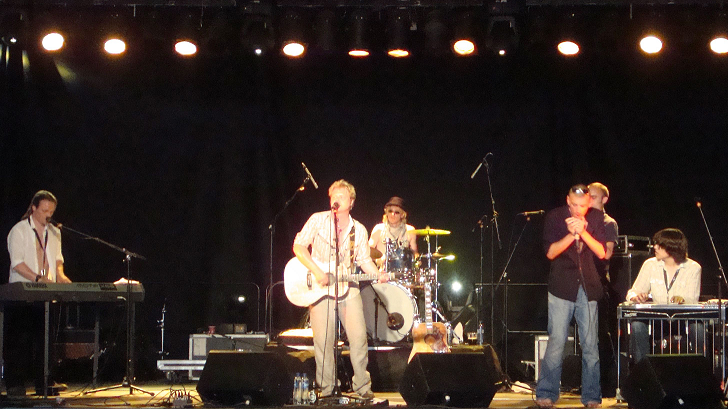
Hey Negrita at the Vinstra Country Festival in Norway 2009

In 2008 Hey Negrita featured in the documentary film We Dreamed America alongside fellow London bands Alabama 3, Kitty Daisy & Lewis, The Barker Band, The Broken Family Band and Matthew Ord. The film, which was directed by Alex Walker and produced by Bechtolsheimer, examines the underground roots music scene in London and features commentary from Bob Harris, Sid Griffin, Old Crow Medicine Show, Tom McRae, Rob Fisher (Willard Grant Conspiracy), Paul Barrere and Fred Tackett (Little Feat) plus a number of music journalists and industry insiders. The film premiered at the SXSW Film Festival in March 2008 and was later released on DVD by Verve Pictures.

=== Burn the Whole Place Down and dissolution (2009) ===
In March 2009 the band embarked on an American tour that included performances at SXSW and Canadian Music Week in Toronto. They also performed at The Great Escape in Brighton, The Bergen Music Festival in Norway, the Darvel Homecoming Festival in Scotland and the Vinstra Music Festival, also in Norway.

In October that year they released the acoustic album Burn the Whole Place Down – A Real Live Acoustic Smoke Out. The album, which was recorded live in four hours, features acoustic versions of songs from all three studio albums plus one new song, the new title track, "Burn the Whole Place Down".

The band broke up in 2009. Bechtolsheimer and Findlay went on to form Curse of Lono.

== Discography ==
=== Studio albums ===
Title	Album details
We Are Catfish	Released: 2005; Label: Fat Fox Records; Formats: Studio album
The Buzz Above	Released: 2006; Label: Fat Fox Records; Formats: Studio album
You Can Kick	Released: 2008; Label: Fat Fox Records; Formats: Studio album
Burn the Whole Place Down: A Real Live Acoustic Smokeout	Released: 2009; Label: Fat Fox Records; Formats: Studio album

=== Singles ===
Title	Year	Album
"Motorboat"	2004	We Are Catfish
"Kathmandu"	2004	We Are Catfish
"Devil in My Shoes"	2005	We Are Catfish
"The Remixes"	2005	We Are Catfish
"Nine to Five"	2006	The Buzz Above
"Can't Walk Away"	2006	The Buzz Above
"Rope"	2008	You Can Kick
"Room Service"	2008	You Can Kick
"Burn the Whole Place Down"	2009	Burn the Whole Place Down
"One Mississippi"	2009	Burn the Whole Place Down
