= Matthias Alexander Rath =

German dressage rider

Personal information
- Born: 2 August 1984 (age 41)
Medal record
Equestrian
Representing Germany
World Championships
Bronze medal – third place	2010 Kentucky	Team dressage
European Championships
Silver medal – second place	2011 Rotterdam	Team dressage
Silver medal – second place	2023 Riesenbeck	Team dressage
Bronze medal – third place	2009 Windsor	Team dressage
Bronze medal – third place	2015 Aachen	Team dressage

Matthias Alexander Rath (born 2 August 1984) is a German dressage rider. Representing Germany, he competed at the 2010 World Equestrian Games and at three European Dressage Championships (in 2009, 2011 and 2015).

Altogether, Rath has won four team medals at various championships (one silver and three bronze). Meanwhile, his best individual championship result is 4th place in freestyle dressage at the 2011 European Dressage Championship, where he rode the famous stallion Totilas.

He also competed at the 2010 edition of Dressage World Cup finals in Den Bosch where he finished 8th.
