= Christoph Koschel =

German dressage rider

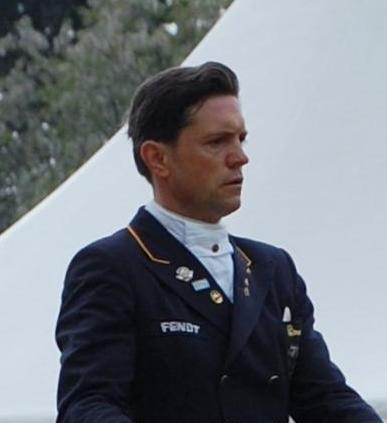
- Christoph Koschel (2013)

Personal information
- Born: 9 April 1976 (age 48)
Medal record
Equestrian
Representing Germany
World Championships
Bronze medal – third place	2010 Kentucky	Team dressage
European Championships
Silver medal – second place	2011 Rotterdam	Team dressage

Christoph Koschel (born 9 April 1976) is a German dressage rider. He competed at the 2010 World Equestrian Games and the 2011 European Dressage Championships. At both occasions he won a medal in team competition (bronze in 2010, silver in 2011). Meanwhile, his current best individual result is 6th place in freestyle competition, achieved at the 2010 World Games.
