= 2010 FEI World Equestrian Games =

Equestrian sports competition

- Host city: Lexington, Kentucky, USA
- Events: 8 disciplines
- Opening: September 25, 2010
- Closing: October 10, 2010
- Website: alltechfeigames.com

The 2010 FEI World Equestrian Games (officially the 2010 Alltech FEI World Equestrian Games) were held at the Kentucky Horse Park in Lexington, Kentucky, U.S. from September 25 to October 10, 2010. This was the sixth edition of the games, which are held every four years and run by the International Federation for Equestrian Sports (FEI). For the first time, Para-equestrian events were added in the program. This was also the first time the games were hosted by a city outside of Europe, and also the first time that all events at the games were held at a single site. (Although the 100-mile/161-km endurance course, by necessity, was mostly contained outside the park, the main veterinary gate was located within the park.)

Alltech, an animal health and nutrition company located in Nicholasville, Kentucky (about 15 minutes from downtown Lexington and 30 minutes from the Horse Park), was the title sponsor of the 2010 Games. The sponsorship was valued at $10 million. However, Alltech's total support went far beyond the name sponsorship package. The company had nearly 60 employees involved with the promotion of the Games—more than the size of the official FEI World Games staff. When the organizing committee for the Games announced a budget cutback due to lower-than-expected ticket sales, Alltech stepped up its financial support. Company founder and president Pearse Lyons also brought in University of Kentucky basketball head coach John Calipari to promote a special luxury ticket package. At the time of the Games, the company's support was estimated to have been $32 million, and the company was expected to (and ultimately did) sponsor the next edition of the Games held in the French region of Normandy in 2014.

== Schedule ==
All times are US EDT (UTC-4)

18 events were contested over 8 disciplines. Para Dressage was included for the first time.

=== Dressage ===
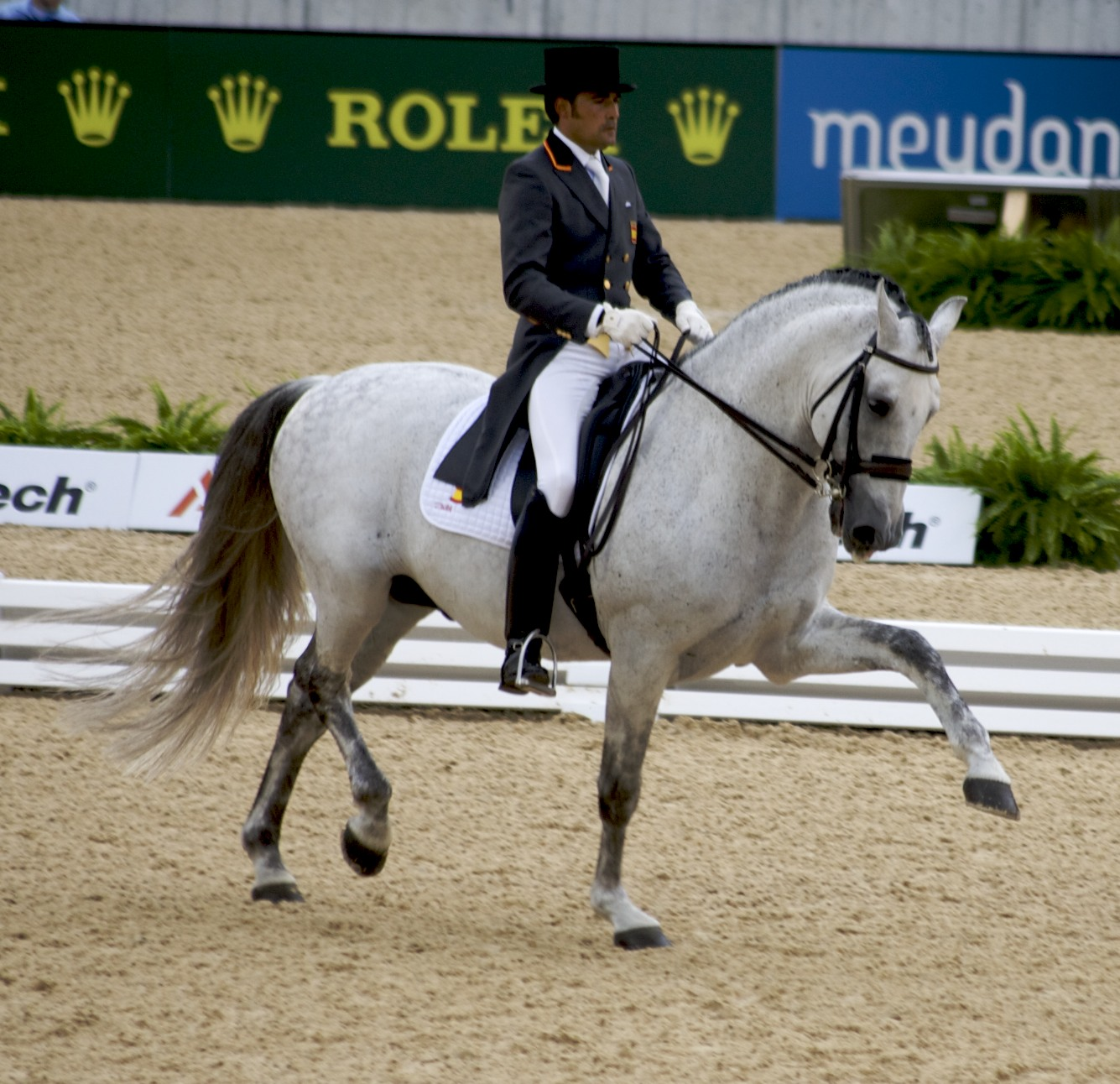
Dressage at the 2010 WEG

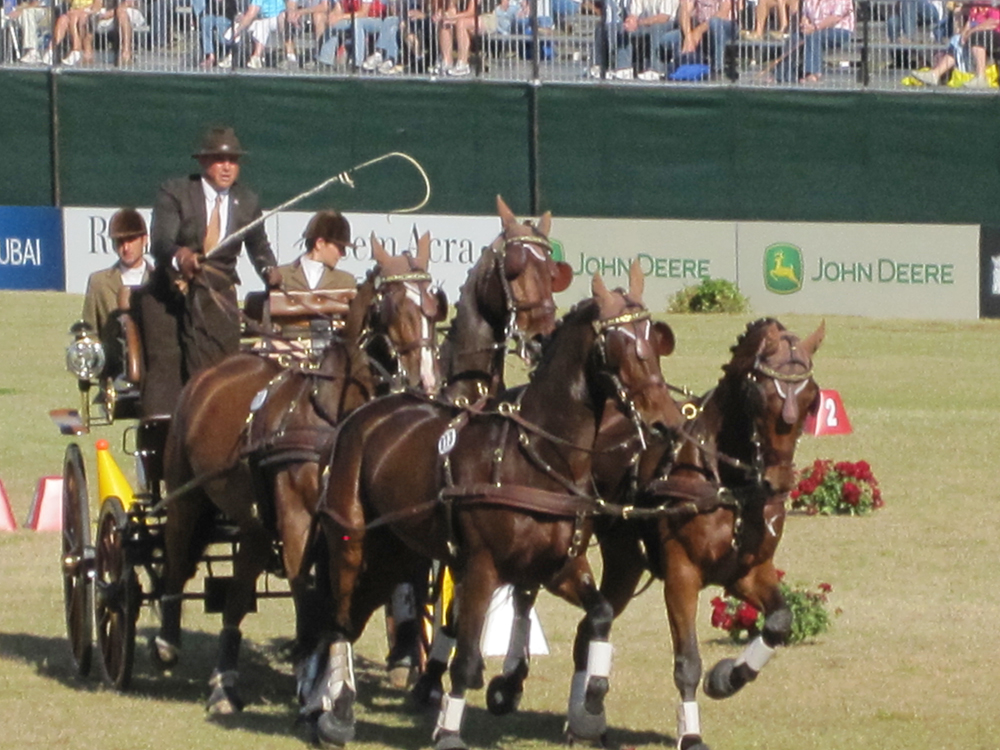
Combined driving at the 2010 World Equestrian Games

Event date	Starting time	Event details
27 September	08:30	Team Grand Prix–1st Half
28 September	07:30	Team Grand Prix–2nd Half
29 September	10:00	Grand Prix Special–1st Half
29 September	14:30	Grand Prix Special–2nd Half
1 October	19:00	Grand Prix Freestyle

=== Combined driving ===
Event date	Starting time	Event details
7 October	09:00	Dressage–Part 1
7 October	14:00	Dressage–Part 2
8 October	09:00	Dressage–Part 3
8 October	14:00	Dressage–Part 4
9 October	10:00	Marathon
10 October	10:00	Obstacle Phase

=== Endurance ===
Event date	Starting time	Event details
26 September	07:00	Team and Individual Competition

=== Eventing ===
Event date	Starting time	Event details
30 September	09:00	Three Day Dressage
1 October	08:30	Three Day Dressage
2 October	09:00	Cross Country
3 October	13:00	Jumping Phase

=== Jumping ===
Event date	Starting time	Event details
4 October	10:00	Speed Combination–Part 1
4 October	14:30	Speed Combination–Part 2
5 October	10:00	Team Combination 1–Part 1
5 October	14:30	Team Combination 1–Part 2
6 October	19:00	Team Final Combination
8 October	17:30	Individual Combination
9 October	20:00	The Rolex Top Four

=== Para Dressage ===
Event date	Starting time	Event details
5 October	08:30	Individual Team Tests–Part 1
6 October	08:30	Individual Championship Tests
7 October	08:30	Individual Championship Tests
8 October	08:30	Individual Championship Tests
9 October	08:30	Individual Freestyle Tests
10 October	08:30	Individual Freestyle Tests

=== Reining ===
Event date	Starting time	Event details
25 September	09:00	Team Competition–Part 1
25 September	14:00	Team Competition–Part 2
26 September	07:30	Team Competition–Part 3
26 September	11:00	Team Competition–Part 4
28 September	09:00	Qualifying Competition
30 September	13:00	Individual Final Competition

=== Vaulting ===
Event date	Starting time	Event details
6 October	08:30	Compulsory-Team–R1
6 October	12:30	Compulsory-Individual Female/Male–R1
7 October	13:00	Freestyle-Individual Female/Male
8 October	12:30	Compulsory-Individual Female/Male–Tech
8 October	16:00	Freestyle Team Competition
9 October	14:30	Freestyle-Final Female/Male
10 October	11:00	Freestyle-Final Team

== Officials ==
Appointment of (Olympic disciplines) officials was as follows:

Dressage

- (United States) Linda Zang (Ground Jury President)
- (Germany) Evi Eisenhardt (Ground Jury Member)
- (Netherlands) Ghislain Fouarge (Ground Jury Member)
- (United Kingdom) Stephen Clarke (Ground Jury Member)
- (Mexico) Maribel Alonso de Quinzanos (Ground Jury Member)
- (Canada) Cara Whitham (Ground Jury Member)
- (Australia) Mary Seefried (Ground Jury Member)
- (Poland) Wojtech Markowski (Technical Delegate)

Jumping

- (United Kingdom) Jon Doney (Ground Jury President)
- (Brazil) Michael Detemple (Ground Jury Member)
- (Canada) Kim Morrison (Ground Jury Member)
- (United States) Linda Allen (Ground Jury Member)
- (Germany) Frank Rothenberger (Technical Delegate)

Eventing

- (United States) Marylin Payne (Ground Jury President)
- (Republic of Ireland) David Lee (Ground Jury Member)
- (Denmark) Anne-Mette Binder (Ground Jury Member)
- (United States) Linda Allen (Jumping judge)
- (Belgium) Tom Ryckewaert (Technical Delegate)

Para-Dressage

- (Netherlands) Hanneke Gerritsen (Ground Jury President)
- (Argentina) Liliana Marcelina Iannone (Ground Jury Member)
- (Germany) Gudrun Hofinga (Ground Jury Member)
- (France) Anne Prain (Ground Jury Member)
- (Australia) Jan Geary (Ground Jury Member)
- (United Kingdom) Sarah Rodger (Ground Jury Member)
- (Portugal) Carlos Lopes (Ground Jury Member)
- (Norway) Kjell Myhre (Ground Jury Member)
- (United Kingdom) Jane Goldsmith (Technical Delegate)

== Participating nations ==
58 countries were represented at the games.

- Argentina
- Australia
- Austria
- Azerbaijan
- Bahrain
- Belgium
- Bermuda
- Brazil
- Canada
- Chile
- China PR
- Chinese Taipei
- Colombia
- Costa Rica
- Czech Republic
- Denmark
- Dominican Republic
- Ecuador
- Egypt
- El Salvador
- Finland
- France
- Germany
- (United Kingdom) Great Britain
- Guatemala
- Hungary
- (Republic of Ireland) Ireland
- India
- Israel
- Italy
- Japan
- Jordan
- Lithuania
- Luxembourg
- Mexico
- Namibia
- Netherlands
- Netherlands Antilles
- New Zealand
- Norway
- Poland
- Portugal
- Qatar
- Russia
- Saudi Arabia
- Singapore
- Slovakia
- South Africa
- Spain
- Sweden
- Switzerland
- Syria
- Turkey
- Ukraine
- United Arab Emirates
- Uruguay
- (United States) USA
- Venezuela
- Zambia

== Medalists and special awards ==
Event	Gold	Silver	Bronze
Dressage Grand Prix Special	(Netherlands) Edward Gal on Moorlands Totilas; 85.708 %	(United Kingdom) Laura Bechtolsheimer on Mistral Hojris; 81.708 %	(United States) Steffen Peters on Ravel; 78.542 %
Dressage Grand Prix Freestyle	(Netherlands) Edward Gal on Moorlands Totilas; 91.800 %	(United Kingdom) Laura Bechtolsheimer on Mistral Hojris; 85.350 %	(United States) Steffen Peters on Ravel; 84.900 %
Dressage Team Grand Prix	Netherlands - Total: 229.745% Hans Peter Minderhoud on Nadine; Imke Schellekens-Bartels on Sunrise; Adelinde Cornelissen on Parzival; Edward Gal on Moorlands Totilas	Great Britain - Total: 224.767% Fiona Bigwood on Wie-Atlantico de Ymas; Maria Eilberg on Two Sox; Carl Hester on Liebling II; Laura Bechtolsheimer on Mistral Hojris	Germany - Total: 220.595% Anabel Balkenhol on Dablino; Christoph Koschel on Donnperignon; Matthias Alexander Rath on Sterntaler-UNICEF; Isabell Werth on Warum nicht FRH
Driving Individual	(Australia) Boyd Exell; 294.64 pens	(Netherlands) IJsbrand Chardon; 303.45 pens	(United States) Tucker Johnson; 337.31 pens
Driving Team	Netherlands - Total: 279.77 pens	United States of America - Total: 300.92 pens	Germany - Total: 322.20 pens
Endurance Individual	(Spain) Maria Mercedes Alvarez Ponton on Nobby; 7:35:44 hours	(United Arab Emirates) Sheikh Mohammed bin Rashid Al Maktoum on Ciel Oriental; 7:36:39 hours	(United Arab Emirates) Sheikh Hamdan bin Mohammed Al Maktoum on SAS Alexis; 7:36:56 hours
Endurance Team	United Arab Emirates - Total: 23:53:36 hours Sheikh Hamdan bin Mohammed Al Maktoum on SAS Alexis; Sheikh Majid bin Mohammed Al Maktoum on Kangoo D'Aurabelle; Sheikh Rashid bin Dalmook Al Maktoum on Rukban Dikruhu Mmn; Ali Mohammed Al Muhairi on Churinga Kagebee	France - Total: 24:49:46 hours Sarah Chakil on Sakalia; Virginie Atger on Azim du Florival; Cecile Miletto Mosti on Easy Fontnoire; Caroline Denayer Gad on Gwellik du Parc	Germany - Total: 25:34:16 hours Dr. Gabriela Förster on Priceless Gold; Sabrina Arnold on Beau ox Belinda Hitzler on Shagar; Melanie Arnold on Shaika Bint Kheoma
Endurance - Best Conditioned Horse (No medal awarded)	(France) Hanaba Du Bois ridden by Jean-Philippe Frances		
Eventing Individual	(Germany) Michael Jung on La Biostethique-Sam FBW; 33.00 pens	(United Kingdom) William Fox-Pitt on Cool Mountain; 42.00 pens	(New Zealand) Andrew Nicholson on Nereo; 43.50 pens
Eventing Team	Great Britain - Total: 139.40 pens William Fox-Pitt on Cool Mountain; Mary King on Imperial Cavalier; Nicola Wilson on Opposition Buzz; Kristina Cook on Miners Frolic	Canada - Total: 151.50 pens Stephanie Rhodes-Bosch on Port Authority; Selena O'Hanlon on Colombo; Hawley Bennett-Awad on Gin & Juice; Kyle Carter on Madison Park	New Zealand - Total: 154.80 pens Andrew Nicholson on Nereo; Mark Todd on Grass Valley; Caroline Powell on Mac Macdonald; Clarke Johnstone on Orient Express
Jumping Individual	(Belgium) Philippe Le Jeune; 0 fts	(Saudi Arabia) Abdullah Al-Sharbatly; 8 fts	(Canada) Eric Lamaze; 9 fts
Jumping Individual - Best Horse in the Final Four; No medal awarded	(Canada) Hickstead; 0 fts		
Jumping Team	Germany - Total: 17.80 fts. Marcus Ehning on Plot Blue; Janne Friederike Meyer on Cellagon Lambrasco; Meredith Michaels-Beerbaum on Checkmate; Carsten-Otto Nagel on Corradina	France - Total: 24.32 fts. Patrice Delaveau on Katchina Mail; Olivier Guillon on Lord de Theize; Pénélope Leprevost on Mylord Carthago; Kevin Staut on Silvana de Hus	Belgium - Total: 24.70 fts. Dirk Demeersman on Bufero VH Panishof; Jos Lansink on Cavalor Valentina van't Heike; Philippe Le Jeune on Vigo d'Arsouilles; Judy-Ann Melchior on Cha Cha Z
Para Dressage Individual Championship Test Grade Ia	(United Kingdom) Sophie Christiansen on Rivaldo of Berkeley; 76.100 %	(United Kingdom) Anne Dunham on Teddy; 73.200 %	(United Kingdom) Emma Sheardown on Purdy's Dream; 71.900 %
Para Dressage Individual Championship Test Grade Ib	(United Kingdom) Lee Pearson on Gentleman; 76.435 %	(United Kingdom) Ricky Balshaw on Academy Award; 72.870 %	(Norway) Jens Lasse Dokkan on Lacour; 70.174 %
Para Dressage Individual Championship Test Grade II	(Netherlands) Petra van de Sande on Toscane; 69.238 %	(Germany) Britta Näpel on Aquilina 3; 67.905 %	(Denmark) Caroline Cecilie Nielsen on Rostorn's Hatim-Tinn; 67.238%
Para Dressage Individual Championship Test Grade III	(Germany) Hannelore Brenner on Women of the World; 72.400 %	(Denmark) Annika Lykke Dalskov on Preussen Wind; 71.067%	(Australia) Sharon Jarvis on Applewood Odorado; 68.867%
Para Dressage Individual Championship Test Grade IV	(United Kingdom) Sophie Wells on Pinocchio; 71.677 %	(Netherlands) Frank Hosmar on Tiesto; 70.129 %	(Denmark) Henrik Weber Sibbesen on Rexton Royal; 69.419 %
Para Dressage Individual Freestyle Tests Grade Ia	(United Kingdom) Emma Sheardown on Purdy's Dream; 78.550 %	(United Kingdom) Sophie Christiansen on Rivaldo of Berkeley; 77.850 %	(United Kingdom) Anne Dunham on Teddy; 74.800 %
Para Dressage Individual Freestyle Tests Grade Ib	(United Kingdom) Lee Pearson on Gentleman; 82.500 %	(Denmark) Stinna Tange Kaastrup on Labbenhus Snoevs; 77.500 %	(Finland) Katja Karjalainen on Rosie; 72.850 %
Para Dressage Individual Freestyle Tests Grade II	(Germany) Dr. Angelika Trabert on Ariva-Avanti; 75.900 %	(Netherlands) Gert Bolmer on Triumph; 75.850 %	(United Kingdom) Jo Pitt on Estralita; 74.900 %
Para Dressage Individual Freestyle Tests Grade III	(Germany) Hannelore Brenner on Women of the World; 79.200 %	(Denmark) Annika Lykke Dalskov on Preussen Wind; 75.400 %	(Australia) Sharon Jarvis on Applewood Odorado; 74.7000 %
Para Dressage Individual Freestyle Tests Grade IV	(United Kingdom) Sophie Wells on Pinocchio; 78.500 %	(Belgium) Michele George on FBW Rainman; 78.050 %	(Netherlands) Frank Hosmar on Tiesto; 77.250 %
Para Dressage Team	Great Britain - Total: 440.376 % Sophie Christiansen on Rivaldo of Berkeley; Anne Dunham on Teddy; Lee Pearson on Gentlemann; Jo Pitt on Estralita	Germany - Total: 420.337 % Hannelore Brenner on Women of the World; Britta Näpel on Aquilina 3 Juliane Theuring on Empaque IV; Dr. Angelika Trabert on Ariva-Avanti	Denmark - Total: 418.389 % Annika Lykke Dalskov on Preussen Wind; Stinna Tange Kaastrup on Labbenhus Snoevs; Caroline Cecilie Nielsen on Rostorn's Hatim-Tinn; Henrik Weber Sibbesen on Rexton Royal
Reining Individual	(United States) Tom McCutcheon on Gunners Special Nite; 228.0 pts	(United States) Craig Schmersal on Mister Montana Nic; 223.0 pts	(Canada) Duane Latimer on Dun Playin Tag; 222.5 pts
Reining Team	United States of America - Total: 674.5 pts Tim McQuay on Hollywoodstinseltown; Craig Schmersal on Mister Montana Nic; Tom McCutcheon on Gunners Special Nite; Shawn Flarida on RC Fancy Step	Belgium - Total: 659.0 pts Jan Boogaerts on Gumpy Grumpy BB; Ann Poels on Whizdom Shines; Cira Baeck on Peek a Boom; Bernard Fonck on BA Reckless Chick	Italy - Total: 655.5 pts Marco Ricotta on Smart and Shiney; Stefano Massignan on Yellow Jersey; Dario Carmignani on Red Chic Peppy; Nicola Brunelli on Spat a Blue
Vaulting Individual Male	(Switzerland) Patric Looser on Record RS von der Wintermühle lunged by Alexandra Knauf; 8.498 pts	(Germany) Kai Vorberg on Sir Bernhard RS von der Wintermühle lunged by Kirsten Graf; 8.463 pts	(France) Nicolas Andreani on Idefix de Braize lunged by Marina Joosten Dupon; 8.452 pts
Vaulting Individual Female	(United Kingdom) Joanne Eccles on W H Bentley lunged by John Eccles; 8.553 pts	(Germany) Antje Hill on Airbus lunged by Irina Lenkeit; 8.523 pts	(Germany) Simone Wiegele on Arkansas lunged by Jessica Schmitz; 8.281 pts
Vaulting Squad	United States of America - Total: 8.029 pts Palatine lunged by Carolyn Bland	Germany - Total: 8.010 pts Adlon lunged by Alexander Hartl	Austria - Total: 7.990 pts Elliot 8 lunged by Klaus Haidacher

== Medals table ==
* Host nation (United States)

Rank	Nation	Gold	Silver	Bronze	Total
1	Great Britain (GBR)	9	7	3	19
2	Germany (GER)	5	5	4	14
3	Netherlands (NED)	5	3	1	9
4	United States (USA)*	3	2	3	8
5	Belgium (BEL)	1	2	1	4
6	United Arab Emirates (UAE)	1	1	1	3
7	Australia (AUS)	1	0	2	3
8	Spain (ESP)	1	0	0	1
8	Switzerland (SUI)	1	0	0	1
10	Denmark (DEN)	0	3	3	6
11	France (FRA)	0	2	1	3
12	Canada (CAN)	0	1	2	3
13	Saudi Arabia (SAU)	0	1	0	1
14	New Zealand (NZL)	0	0	2	2
15	Austria (AUT)	0	0	1	1
15	Finland (FIN)	0	0	1	1
15	Italy (ITA)	0	0	1	1
15	Norway (NOR)	0	0	1	1
Totals (18 entries)		27	27	27	81
