= Totilas =

Dressage horse (2000–2020)

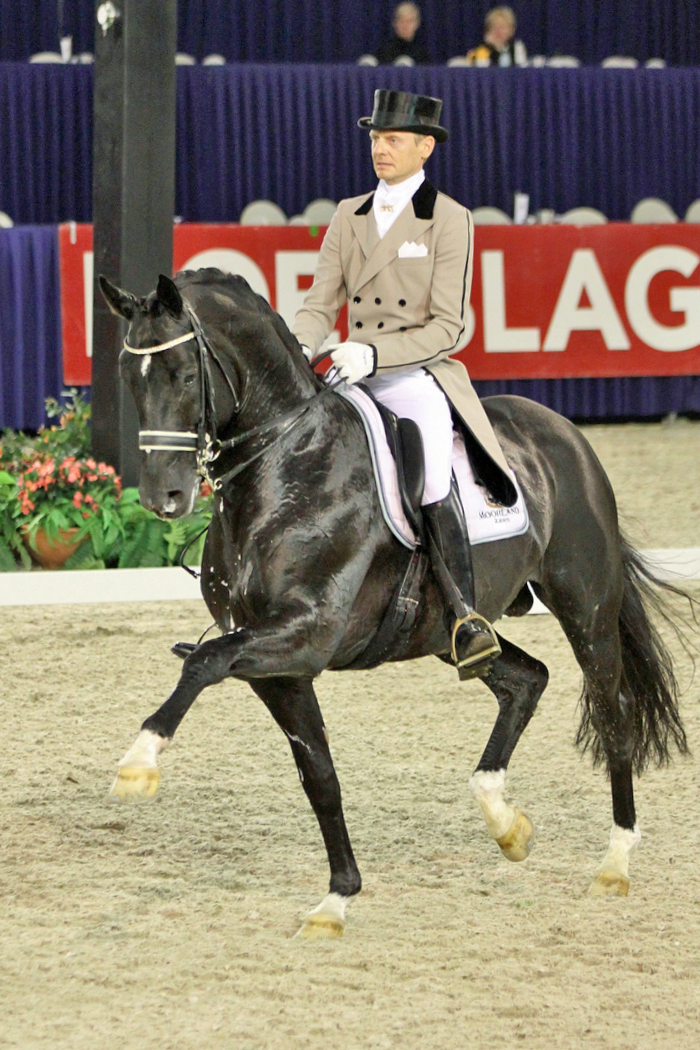
- Breed: Dutch Warmblood (KWPN)
- Sire: Gribaldi (Trakehner)
- Dam: Lominka (KWPN)
- Maternal grandsire: Glendale (KWPN)
- Sex: Stallion
- Foaled: 23 May 2000
- Died: 14 December 2020 (aged 20)
- Country: Netherlands
- Colour: Black
- Breeder: J.K.Schuil & A. Visser
- Owner: Paul Schockemöhle, Ann-Kathrin Linsenhoff
- Rider: Edward Gal, Matthias Alexander Rath

Totilas
Medal record

Equestrian

Representing Netherlands

World Championships
Gold medal – first place	2010 Lexington	Team Dressage
Gold medal – first place	2010 Lexington	Special dressage
Gold medal – first place	2010 Lexington	Freestyle dressage

European Championships
Gold medal – first place	2009 Windsor	Team Dressage
Gold medal – first place	2009 Windsor	Freestyle dressage
Silver medal – second place	2009 Windsor	Special dressage

Representing Germany

European Championships
Silver medal – second place	2011 Rotterdam	Team Dressage
Bronze medal – third place	2015 Aachen	Team Dressage

Totilas (23 May 2000 – 14 December 2020), also known from 2006 to 2011 as Moorlands Totilas, and nicknamed "Toto", was a Dutch Warmblood stallion standing 17.1 hands (69 inches, 175 cm) high who was considered to be one of the most outstanding competitive dressage horses in the world, the first horse to score above 90 in dressage competition, and the former holder of the world record for the highest dressage score in Grand Prix Freestyle Dressage.

Going into the 2010 FEI World Equestrian Games (WEG), Moorlands Totilas and his rider, Edward Gal, had amassed multiple world-record scores in international competition, leading one American journalist to call them "rock stars in the horse world". Totilas was retired from competition in August 2015 and died on 14 December 2020 due to complications from colic.

== Early show career ==
Totilas was bred by Jan K. Schuil and Anna Schuil-Visser in Broeksterwâld (Broeksterwoude) in the Netherlands. They gave him his basic training. Upon entering major competition at age five, he was ridden by Jiska van den Akker and exhibited at the 2005 World Breeding Championships for Young Horses at Verden, Germany. There he distinguished himself as the best horse from the Netherlands, and placed fourth in the final ranking of five-year-old dressage horses. Also in 2005, his owners contacted Edward Gal and asked him to ride and compete Totilas. In 2006, after Gal began working with the horse, his sponsors Cees (also spelled Kees) and Tosca Visser purchased Totilas in the name of their investment company, Moorland BV. After this purchase the horse competed under the name "Moorlands Totilas".

Totilas was ridden throughout most of his international Grand Prix career by Gal, under the flag of the Netherlands. Gal first began working with the horse in 2006 and the pair started to compete in 2008. Gal and the team of people who worked with the horse understood that Toto was "something special" after their first Grand Prix (GP) competition, with Gal later stating, "He has an incredible amount of talent; it's simply a pleasure to ride him."

In July 2009, Gal and Toto broke the previous world record score in Grand Prix Freestyle held by Anky van Grunsven with an 89.50% mark at Hickstead, England, and shortly thereafter followed it up breaking their own record with a score of 90.75% and win gold at the 2009 FEI European Jumping and Dressage Championships. The pair also won a silver in the special dressage and gold in the team dressage event. In December 2009, at the fourth leg of the 2009–10 FEI World Cup Dressage series at Olympia in London, they extended their record in GP Freestyle to 92.30%, more than 10 points above the second-place finisher. They won that season's FEI World Cup final with a win in GP Freestyle at home in the Netherlands, winning by more than 7 points with a score better than their first world record. The pair also have a world-record score in the Grand Prix Special discipline to their credit, having recorded 86.460% at Aachen in July 2010. The pair were triple gold medalists at the 2010 FEI World Equestrian Games, becoming the first horse–rider partnership ever to sweep the three available dressage gold medals (team, special and freestyle) at a single FEI World Games.

The horse's career was not free of controversy, particularly due to his training using the highly controversial "LDR" (low, deep and round) hyperflexion training technique also known as Rollkur, which faces claims of causing physical harm to the horse, and is considered "mental abuse" by the FEI. Critics claimed that his extravagant paces were not natural, but rather a product of harmful training, accusing Totilas' trainers of artificially inflating dressage scores and corrupting the fundamentals of the sport. One German equestrian magazine compared his performances to those in a circus. The head of the World Cup judging panel at the Olympia competition in London dismissed such criticism, saying, "People should be big enough to recognise brilliance when they see it."

While some give primary credit to the skill of Gal as the primary reason the horse reached such a high level at a very young age for a dressage horse, Anne Gribbons, dressage technical adviser for the United States Equestrian Federation, assessed Totilas as having taken the sport to a new level: "He is capable of such power and balance while he's in motion that it is almost beyond what most other horses can do."

== Breeding status and sale ==
Totilas was approved for breeding by the KWPN in 2009, and stood at stud in 2010 for a stud fee of €5,500, or about $7,000 (US), considered a very high fee for a warmblood stallion. A total of 175 mares were approved for the stallion, including US Olympic medal-winner Brentina. His first year at stud generated fees of nearly €1.4 million. In September 2010, an embryo by Totilas sold for €32,000. His first foal, a seal brown-colored filly named Moorlands Guinevere, was foaled 23 January 2011 in Utrecht, Netherlands.

In October 2010, it was announced that sport horse breeder Paul Schockemöhle had purchased Totilas, for an undisclosed sale price, estimated to be in the range of €9.5 million to as high as €15 million. At the World Equestrian Games, Gal strongly denied that the horse was for sale, but his owners stated that after his wins at the WEG, "we could no longer ignore the interest in the stallion." Though the official press release stated that Gal "understood" the Vissers' decision, other news sources quoted him as stating, "I'm absolutely devastated...It's like I'm struck by lightning."

The news was a shock in the dressage community, with the Dutch national dressage team expressing disappointment that their Olympic hopes had been damaged by the horse being sold to an individual from Germany, The Netherlands' closest rival. Dutch team trainer Sjef Janssen described the sale as "a huge blood-letting" for the team, expressing concerns that the horse would perform for Germany in the 2012 Olympics. The volume of online discussions led the Eurodressage web site to crash. Comment included criticism of Anky van Grunsven from Gal's business partner Nicole Werner for posting the news via Twitter prior to the official news release, and a resulting public exchange between the two camps on Facebook. The Vissers stated that they would continue to make promising and talented horses available to Gal.

== German ownership ==
In March 2011, Schockemöhle changed the horse's show name with the FEI to "Totilas". Schockemöhle and promoter Michael Mronz marketed the horse under the new name. Schockemöhle and co-owner Ann-Kathrin Linsenhoff selected Matthias Alexander Rath, a 26-year-old German rider who is Linsenhoff's stepson, to be the horse's new rider. In November 2010, Totilas and Rath made a public appearance in Mühlen, Germany, at Schockemöhle's stallion station. The pair competed with the German team for the European Dressage Championships held in Rotterdam in August 2011, failing to medal in that competition individually, although their scores assisted the Germans to win a silver team medal.

Allegations of abuse arose soon after the pair's 2011 performance in Rotterdam. A public showing where Totilas stuck out his tongue while performing, viewed as a sign of stress, caused public concern. Further controversy arose in October 2012, when the German branch of PETA filed a legal complaint against Rath, Schockemöhle and Linsenhoff, alleging that Totilas was being abused due to the use of rollkur in his training and management that kept him confined in a box stall, isolated from other horses. PETA alleged that the horse's treatment violated the free-movement requirements of the German Federal Ministry of Food, Agriculture, and Consumer Protection. As of 2012, prosecutors had not determined whether PETA's allegations were sufficient to constitute an alleged violation of German law. As the bulk of the complaint focused on the issue of rollkur training, which PETA was attempting to ban in Germany (although it was already prohibited by the German Equestrian Federation), the charge was viewed within the dressage community as a means to bring the issue to public attention via a high-profile case.

Totilas was injured during the winter of 2011/12. Rath and Totilas were expected to compete in the 2012 Olympics and placed in the top three at the 2012 German Championships. Shortly afterwards, Rath became ill with mononucleosis and withdrew from competition at CHIO Aachen in June and subsequently from the German Olympic team. Rath expressed hope that the pair would be able to compete in the 2016 Olympics, although by that time Totilas would be 16 years old. They then moved to the Netherlands to work with Sjef Janssen, coach of the Dutch team and of gold medalist Anky van Grunsven, presumably to obtain experience in the training techniques that Totilas was familiar with while in the care of Gal.

Totilas was injured in 2012 and spent two years out of competition. Rath and Totilas made their return at the May 2014 CDI Kapellen event in Belgium and competed in two test events at the 2014 CDIO Aachen event but had to withdraw from the freestyle event due to another injury. The pair returned in 2015 at a local event in Hulten and then competed at the CDIO Hagen in July. Rath and Totilas won a bronze in the team event at the 2015 European Championships in Aachen. The pair scored 75.9% in the grand prix event, with some observers believing Totilas to be lame. He was subsequently withdrawn from the special freestyle event. Aachen was Totilas' final competition; a subsequent MRI scan showed bone inflammation in his left hind hoof and he was retired in August 2015.

Totilas spent his retirement at the Gestut Schafhof in Kronberg, Germany, travelling to Mühlen for breeding purposes. He made a celebration appearance at the 2019 KWPN Stallion Licensing event. In retirement he was ridden by Rath and Linsenhoff. He died from colic on 14 December 2020.

== Pedigree ==
Moorlands Totilas was sired by a Trakehner stallion, Gribaldi, that was approved by KWPN, the Dutch Warmblood registry, and noted for elegance and refinement. Gribaldi had also been shown at the Grand Prix level by Gal. Toto's dam, Lominka, a KWPN-approved Dutch Warmblood, came from bloodlines that have produced both show jumping and dressage horses, many of whom were noted for good temperament.

Enrico Caruso (Trakehner)
Kostolany (Trakehner)
Kapstadt (Trakehner)
Gribaldi (Trakehner)
Ibikus (Trakehner)
Gondola III (Trakehner)
Gloria VI (Trakehner)
Moorlands Totilas
Nimmerdor (KWPN)
Glendale (KWPN)
Silja (KWPN)
Lominka (KWPN)
Akteur (Groningen (NWP))
Elsa (KWPN)
Wominka (KWPN)

== See also ==
- List of historical horses
