= Equestrian at the 1988 Summer Olympics – Individual dressage =

Equestrian at the Olympics

Individual dressage at the Games of the XXIV Olympiad
- Venue: Seoul Race Park
- Date: 24–27 September
- Competitors: 53 from 18 nations

Medalists
1st place, gold medalist(s)		Nicole Uphoff	West Germany
2nd place, silver medalist(s)		Margit Otto-Crépin	France
3rd place, bronze medalist(s)		Christine Stückelberger	Switzerland

The individual dressage event was one of six equestrian events on the Equestrian at the 1988 Summer Olympics programme. The competition was held at the Seoul Race Park in Seoul.

The competition was split into two phases:

1. Qualifying Round (24–25 September)
  Riders performed the Grand Prix test. The eighteen riders with the highest scores advanced to the final (maximum 3 per nation).
2. Final (27 September)
  Riders performed the Grand Prix Special test.

== Results ==
Rank	Rider	Horse	Qualifying		Final
Rank	Rider	Horse	Points	Rank	Points
1st place, gold medalist(s)	Nicole Uphoff (FRG)	Rembrandt	1458	1	1521
2nd place, silver medalist(s)	Margit Otto-Crépin (FRA)	Corlandus	1455	2	1462
3rd place, bronze medalist(s)	Christine Stückelberger (SUI)	Gauguin de Lully	1430	4	1417
4	Cindy Neale-Ishoy (CAN)	Dynasty	1363	10	1401
5	Kyra Kyrklund (FIN)	Matador	1416	5	1393
6	Monica Theodorescu (FRG)	Ganimedes	1433	3	1385
7	Otto Hofer (SUI)	Andiamo	1392	9	1383
8	Ann-Kathrin Linsenhoff (FRG)	Courage	1411	6	1374
9	Nina Menkova (URS)	Dikson	1395	8	1354
10	Seo Jeong-gyun (KOR)	Pascal	1324	13	1349
11	Daniel Ramseier (SUI)	Random	1342	11	1330
12	Gina Smith (CAN)	Malte	1298	18	1326
13	Robert Dover (USA)	Federleicht	1327	12	1320
14	Jennie Loriston-Clarke (GBR)	Dutch Gold	1293	19	1304
15	Ellen Bontje (NED)	Petit Prince	1312	14	1297
16	Ashley Nicoll (CAN)	Reipo	1308	15	1296
17	Jessica Ransehousen (USA)	Orpheus	1308	15	1282
18	Nils Haagensen (DEN)	Cantat	1293	19	1280
19	Annemarie Sanders-Keyzer (NED)	Amon	1303	17	1267
20	Reiner Klimke (FRG)	Ahlerich	1401	7	Did not advance
21	Tineke Bartels (NED)	Olympic Duphar	1288	21	Did not advance
22	Daria Fantoni (ITA)	Sonny Boy	1284	22	Did not advance
23	Tricia Gardiner (GBR)	Wily Imp	1274	23	Did not advance
24	Olga Klimko (URS)	Buket	1272	24	Did not advance
25	Ulla Håkansson (SWE)	Cesam	1271	25	Did not advance
26	Morten Thomsen (DEN)	Diplomat	1269	26	Did not advance
27	Anne Grethe Jensen (DEN)	Ravel	1263	27	Did not advance
28	Yuri Kovshov (URS)	Barin	1259	28	Did not advance
29	Eva Maria Pracht (CAN)	Emirage	1255	29	Did not advance
30	Louise Nathhorst (SWE)	Cirac	1251	30	Did not advance
31	Anatoly Tankov (URS)	Izharsk	1249	31	Did not advance
31	Lars Andersson (SWE)	Herkules	1249	31	Did not advance
33	Belinda Baudin (USA)	Christopher	1248	33	Did not advance
34	Erica Taylor (AUS)	Crown Law	1245	34	Did not advance
35	Tutu Sohlberg (FIN)	Pakistan	1242	35	Did not advance
36	Anky van Grunsven (NED)	Prisco	1239	36	Did not advance
37	Diana Mason (GBR)	Prince Consort	1230	37	Did not advance
38	Héctor Rodríguez (COL)	El Sahib	1229	38	Did not advance
39	Jenny Eriksson (FIN)	My Way	1225	39	Did not advance
39	Samuel Schatzmann (SUI)	Rochus	1225	39	Did not advance
41	Dominique d'Esmé (FRA)	Hopal Fleurihn	1219	41	Did not advance
42	Anne van Olst (DEN)	Le Fiere	1217	42	Did not advance
43	Lendon Gray (USA)	Later On	1212	43	Did not advance
44	Juan Matute (ESP)	Rex The Blacky	1205	44	Did not advance
45	Barbara Hammond (GBR)	Krist	1174	45	Did not advance
46	Kikuko Inoue (JPN)	Teldor	1169	46	Did not advance
47	Eva Lindsten (SWE)	Cello	1167	47	Did not advance
48	Maarit Raiskio (FIN)	Nor	1161	48	Did not advance
49	Philippe Limousin (FRA)	Iris de la Fosse	1158	49	Did not advance
50	Sin Chang-mu (KOR)	Lugana	1101	50	Did not advance
51	James Walsh (IRL)	Robby	1096	51	Did not advance
52	Naoko Sakurai (JPN)	Ravello	1081	52	Did not advance
53	María Paula Bernal (COL)	Armagnac	978	53	Did not advance
