= Equestrian at the 1976 Summer Olympics – Team dressage =

Equestrian at the Olympics

Team dressage at the Games of the XXI Olympiad
- Venue: Olympic Equestrian Centre
- Date: 29 July
- Competitors: 24 (8 teams) from 8 nations

Medalists
1st place, gold medalist(s)		Harry Boldt; Reiner Klimke; Gabriela Grillo	West Germany
2nd place, silver medalist(s)		Christine Stückelberger; Ulrich Lehmann; Doris Ramseier	Switzerland
3rd place, bronze medalist(s)		Hilda Gurney; Dorothy Morkis; Edith Master	United States

The team dressage in equestrian at the 1976 Olympic Games in Montreal was held at Olympic Equestrian Centre on 29 July.

== Competition format ==
The team medals were awarded after the Grand-Prix portion of the individual competition. After the Grand-Prix portion of the individual event the three rides of each team were added up and the highest score was the winner, all three scores counted towards the final. Both the team and the individual competitions ran concurrently.

== Results ==
Rank	Nation	Individual results			Total
Rank	Nation	Rider	Horse	Score	Total
1st place, gold medalist(s)	West Germany	Harry Boldt	Woyceck	1863	5155
1st place, gold medalist(s)	West Germany	Reiner Klimke	Mehmed	1751	5155
1st place, gold medalist(s)	West Germany	Gabriela Grillo	Ultimo	1541	5155
2nd place, silver medalist(s)	Switzerland	Christine Stückelberger	Granat	1869	4684
2nd place, silver medalist(s)	Switzerland	Ulrich Lehmann	Widin	1425	4684
2nd place, silver medalist(s)	Switzerland	Doris Ramseier	Roch	1390	4684
3rd place, bronze medalist(s)	United States	Hilda Gurney	Keen	1607	4647
3rd place, bronze medalist(s)	United States	Dorothy Morkis	Monaco	1559	4647
3rd place, bronze medalist(s)	United States	Edith Master	Dahlwitz	1481	4647
4	Soviet Union	Viktor Ugryumov	Said	1597	4542
4	Soviet Union	Ivan Kalita	Tarif	1520	4542
4	Soviet Union	Ivan Kizimov	Rebus	1425	4542
5	Canada	Christilot Boylen	Gaspano	1590	4538
5	Canada	Lorraine Stubbs	True North	1549	4538
5	Canada	Barbara Stracey	Jungher II	1399	4538
6	Denmark	Ulla Petersen	Chigwell	1552	4448
6	Denmark	Tonny Jensen	Fox	1521	4448
6	Denmark	Nils Haagensen	Lowenstern	1375	4448
7	Netherlands	Jo Rutten	Banjo	1533	4380
7	Netherlands	Louky van Olphen-van Amstel	Aleric	1449	4380
7	Netherlands	Marjolijn Greeve	Lucky Boy	1398	4380
8	Great Britain	Jennie Loriston-Clarke	Kadett	1375	4076
8	Great Britain	Sarah Whitmore	Junker	1375	4076
8	Great Britain	Diana Mason	Special Ed	1326	4076
