= Equestrian at the 1988 Summer Olympics – Team dressage =

Equestrian at the Olympics

Team dressage at the Games of the XXIV Olympiad
- Venue: Seoul Race Park
- Date: 24–25 September
- Competitors: 43 (11 teams) from 11 nations

Medalists
1st place, gold medalist(s)		Nicole Uphoff; Monica Theodorescu; Ann-Kathrin Linsenhoff; Reiner Klimke	West Germany
2nd place, silver medalist(s)		Christine Stückelberger; Otto Hofer; Daniel Ramseier; Samuel Schatzmann	Switzerland
3rd place, bronze medalist(s)		Cindy Neale-Ishoy; Ashley Nicoll; Gina Smith; Eva Maria Pracht	Canada

The team dressage in equestrian at the 1988 Summer Olympics in Seoul was held at Santa Anita Racetrack on 24 and 25 September 1988.

== Competition format ==
The team medals were awarded after the Grand-Prix portion of the individual competition. After the Grand-Prix portion of the individual event, the best three rides of each team were added up and the highest score was the winner. Both the team and the individual competitions ran concurrently.

== Results ==
Rank	Nation	Individual results			Total
Rank	Nation	Rider	Horse	Score	Total
1st place, gold medalist(s)	West Germany	Nicole Uphoff	Rembrandt	1458	4302
1st place, gold medalist(s)	West Germany	Monica Theodorescu	Ganimedes	1433	4302
1st place, gold medalist(s)	West Germany	Ann-Kathrin Linsenhoff	Courage	1411	4302
1st place, gold medalist(s)	West Germany	Reiner Klimke	Ahlerich	1401	4302
2nd place, silver medalist(s)	Switzerland	Christine Stückelberger	Gauguin de Lully	1430	4164
2nd place, silver medalist(s)	Switzerland	Otto Hofer	Andiamo	1392	4164
2nd place, silver medalist(s)	Switzerland	Daniel Ramseier	Random	1342	4164
2nd place, silver medalist(s)	Switzerland	Samuel Schatzmann	Rochus	1225	4164
3rd place, bronze medalist(s)	Canada	Cindy Neale-Ishoy	Dynasty	1363	3969
3rd place, bronze medalist(s)	Canada	Ashley Nicoll	Reipo	1308	3969
3rd place, bronze medalist(s)	Canada	Gina Smith	Malte	1298	3969
3rd place, bronze medalist(s)	Canada	Eva Maria Pracht	Emirage	1255	3969
4	Soviet Union	Nina Menkova	Dikson	1395	3926
4	Soviet Union	Olga Klimko	Buket	1272	3926
4	Soviet Union	Yuri Kovshov	Barin	1259	3926
4	Soviet Union	Anatoly Tankov	Izharks	1249	3926
5	Netherlands	Ellen Bontje	Petit Prince	1312	3903
5	Netherlands	Annemarie Sanders-Keyzer	Amon	1303	3903
5	Netherlands	Tineke Bartels	Olympic Duphar	1288	3903
5	Netherlands	Anky van Grunsven	Prisco	1239	3903
6	Finland	Kyra Kyrklund	Matador	1416	3883
6	Finland	Tutu Sohlberg	Pakistan	1242	3883
6	Finland	Jenny Eriksson	My Way	1225	3883
6	Finland	Maarit Raiskio	Nor	1161	3883
6	United States	Robert Dover	Federleicht	1327	3883
6	United States	Jessica Ransehousen	Orpheus	1308	3883
6	United States	Belinda Baudin	Christopher	1248	3883
6	United States	Lendon Gray	Later On	1212	3883
8	France	Margit Otto-Crépin	Corlandus	1455	3832
8	France	Dominique d'Esmé	Hopal Fleurihn	1219	3832
8	France	Philippe Limousin	Iris de la Fosse	1158	3832
9	Denmark	Nils Haagensen	Cantat	1293	3825
9	Denmark	Morten Thomsen	Diplomat	1269	3825
9	Denmark	Anne Grethe Jensen	Ravel	1263	3825
9	Denmark	Anne van Olst	La Fiere	1217	3825
10	Great Britain	Jennie Loriston-Clarke	Dutch Gold	1293	3797
10	Great Britain	Tricia Gardiner	Wily Imp	1274	3797
10	Great Britain	Diana Mason	Prince Consort	1230	3797
10	Great Britain	Barbara Hammond	Krist	1174	3797
11	Sweden	Ulla Håkansson	Cesam	1271	3771
11	Sweden	Louise Nathhorst	Cirac	1251	3771
11	Sweden	Lars Andersson	Herkules	1249	3771
11	Sweden	Eva Lindsten	Cello	1167	3771
