= Equestrian at the 1976 Summer Olympics – Individual dressage =

Equestrian at the Olympics

Individual dressage at the Games of the XXI Olympiad
- Venue: Olympic Equestrian Centre
- Date: 29–30 July
- Competitors: 27 from 11 nations

Medalists
1st place, gold medalist(s)		Christine Stückelberger	Switzerland
2nd place, silver medalist(s)		Harry Boldt	West Germany
3rd place, bronze medalist(s)		Reiner Klimke	West Germany

The individual dressage event was one of six equestrian events on the equestrian programme. The competition was held at the Olympic Equestrian Centre in Bromont, Quebec.

The competition was split into two phases:

1. Grand Prix (29 July)
  Riders performed the Grand Prix test. The twelve riders with the highest scores advanced to the final.
2. Grand Prix Special (30 July)
  Riders performed the Grand Prix Special test.

== Results ==
Rank	Rider	Horse	Grand Prix		Grand Prix Special
Rank	Rider	Horse	Points	Rank	Points
1st place, gold medalist(s)	Christine Stückelberger (SUI)	Granat	1869	1	1486
2nd place, silver medalist(s)	Harry Boldt (FRG)	Woycek	1863	2	1435
3rd place, bronze medalist(s)	Reiner Klimke (FRG)	Mehmed	1751	3	1395
4	Gabriela Grillo (FRG)	Ultimo	1541	10	1257
5	Dorothy Morkis (USA)	Monaco	1559	7	1249
6	Viktor Ugryumov (URS)	Said	1597	5	1247
7	Christilot Boylen (CAN)	Gaspano	1590	6	1217
8	Ulla Petersen (DEN)	Chigwell	1552	8	1192
9	Jo Rutten (NED)	Banjo	1533	11	1189
10	Hilda Gurney (USA)	Keen	1607	4	1167
11	Lorraine Stubbs (CAN)	True North	1549	9	1153
12	Tonny Jensen (DEN)	Fox	1521	12	1076
13	Ivan Kalita (URS)	Tarif	1520	13	Did not advance
14	Edith Master (USA)	Dahlwitz	1481	14	Did not advance
15	Louky van Olphen-van Amstel (NED)	Aleric	1449	15	Did not advance
16	Ulrich Lehmann (SUI)	Widin	1425	16	Did not advance
16	Ivan Kizimov (URS)	Rebus	1425	16	Did not advance
18	Barbara Stracey (CAN)	Jungher II	1399	18	Did not advance
19	Marjolijn Greeve (NED)	Lucky Boy	1398	19	Did not advance
20	Dominique d'Esmé (FRA)	Reims	1391	20	Did not advance
21	Doris Ramseier (SUI)	Roch	1390	21	Did not advance
22	Nils Haagensen (DEN)	Lowenstern	1375	22	Did not advance
22	Jennie Loriston-Clarke (GBR)	Kadett	1375	22	Did not advance
22	Sarah Whitmore (GBR)	Junker	1375	22	Did not advance
25	Diana Mason (GBR)	Special Ed	1326	25	Did not advance
25	Guillermo Pellegrini (ARG)	Rosicler	1294	25	Did not advance
27	Fausto Puccini (ITA)	Palazzo	1258	27	Did not advance
