= 1976 United States men's Olympic basketball team =

- Head coach: Dean Smith
- Scoring leader: (United States) Adrian Dantley 19.3
- Rebounding leader: (United States) Scott May 6.2
- Assists leader: (United States) Phil Ford 9.0

The 1976 United States men's Olympic basketball team represented the United States at the 1976 Summer Olympics in Montreal, Quebec, Canada. The U.S. team won its eighth gold medal, out of the previous nine Summer Olympic Games.

== Roster ==
Name	Position	Height	Weight	Age	Team/School	Home Town
Tate Armstrong	G	6'3"	170	20	Duke	Houston, Texas
Quinn Buckner	G	6'3"	203	21	Indiana	Dolton, Illinois
Kenny Carr	F	6'7"	225	21	North Carolina State	Washington, D.C.
Adrian Dantley	G	6'5"	209	21	Notre Dame	Washington, D.C.
Walter Davis	F	6'5"	190	21	North Carolina	Charlotte, North Carolina
Phil Ford	G	6'2"	170	20	North Carolina	Rocky Mount, North Carolina
Ernie Grunfeld	F	6'6"	225	21	Tennessee	Forest Hills, New York
Phil Hubbard	F	6'7"	194	19	Michigan	Canton, Ohio
Mitch Kupchak	C	6'10"	229	22	North Carolina	Brentwood, New York
Tom LaGarde	C	6'10"	214	21	North Carolina	Detroit, Michigan
Scott May	F	6'7"	218	22	Indiana	Sandusky, Ohio
Steve Sheppard	G	6'6"	209	22	Maryland	Bronx, New York

== 1976 USA results ==
- United States beat Italy, 106–86
- United States beat Puerto Rico, 95–94
- United States beat Yugoslavia, 112–93
- United States beat Egypt, 2–0 (forfeit)
- United States beat Czechoslovakia, 81–76
- United States beat Canada, 95–77
- United States beat Yugoslavia, 95–74
- Team Record: 7–0

== 1976 Olympic Games final standings ==
1. United States (7–0)
2. Yugoslavia (5–2)
3. Soviet Union (6–1)
4. Canada (4–3)
5. Italy (5–2)
6. Czechoslovakia (3–4)
7. Cuba (4–3)
8. Australia (2–5)
9. Puerto Rico (3–4)
10. Mexico (1–5)
11. Japan (0–6)
12. Egypt (0–5)

== See also ==
- Basketball at the 1976 Summer Olympics
