= Ganimedes =

Black Westphalian gelding; dressage competitor

- Breed: Westphalian
- Sire: Grünhorn III (Westphalian)
- Grandsire: Grünschnabel (Westphalian)
- Dam: Finess (Westphalian)
- Maternal grandsire: Fidalgo xx (Thoroughbred)
- Sex: Gelding
- Foaled: 1978
- Country: Germany
- Colour: Black
- Breeder: August Benning

Ganimedes
Medal record

Summer Olympics
Gold medal – first place	1988 Seoul	Team dressage

World Championships
Gold medal – first place	1990 Stockholm	Team dressage
Bronze medal – third place	1990 Stockholm	Individual dressage

European Championships
Gold medal – first place	1989 Mondorf	Team dressage

World Cup
Gold medal – first place	1993 Den Bosch	Individual dressage
Gold medal – first place	1994 Gothenburg	Individual dressage
Silver medal – second place	1995 Los Angeles	Individual dressage

Ganimedes (1978–2006) was a black Westphalian gelding, ridden for Germany by Monica Theodorescu in dressage competitions. During their competition career, the pair won medals at the Olympic Games, World Championships and European Championships, and reached podium several times at the World Cup Finals. Ganimedes was euthanized in 2006.

== Early life ==
The black Westphalian gelding was bred in 1978 by August Benning. He was named after Ganymede, a divine hero described as the most beautiful of mortals in Greek mythology. His sire was Grünhorn III and his dam was Finess, while his dam's sire was Fidalgo xx. In 1981, Ganimedes was acquired by Romanian-born dressage trainer George Theodorescu as a future prospect for his daughter Monica.

== Competitive career ==
Ganimedes and Monica Theodorescu competed in their first and only Olympic Games in 1988 at the Seoul Games. The pair helped the German team to a gold medal, and were also in contention for an individual honor, having placed third in the opening round. Several major mistakes in the final round, however, dropped them to the eventual 6th-place finish. The mistakes were largely attributed to a wandering shadow coming from a roof of the Grand Stand, which spooked at least six horses during the competition.

Following their Olympic debut, Ganimedes and Theodorescu reappeared on the German team for the 1989 European Championships in Mondorf and the 1990 World Championships in Stockholm. Both times they helped the German team to a team gold, while in Stockholm they also managed to reach an individual podium for the first time following a bronze medal performance.

Following a tendon injury, Ganimedes was kept out of the competition for the most of 1991. By the time he recovered, he was faced with a rival in Theodorescu's stables, Hanoverian chestnut Grunox. Grunox went on to be Theodorescu's pick for the Barcelona Olympics, while Ganimedes' competition career from that point on was mostly focused on the World Cup. The pair enjoyed much success in the new environment. They won their premier World Cup title in 1993, which they successfully defended a year later. In 1995, they were the reserve World Cup champions, behind Anky van Grunsven and Bonfire.

In the years of competing with Theodorescu, Ganimedes was known for his copybook extensions and lateral work, exceptional walk and well-centered pirouettes. Conversely, it is believed that a timid piaffe kept them away from the very top during their entire career.

Ganimedes was retired from sport in 1995.

== Legacy ==
Ganimedes enjoyed 11 years of retirement at Theodorescu's home. In 2006, he was euthanized after experiencing a rapid decline in health. Theodorescu described her partnership with Ganimedes with "I spent half my life together with Ganimedes. It is hard to say what my fondest memory is of him or our greatest success. It is everything together. I have so many wonderful memories."
