= Dynasty (horse) =

Dark bay Hanoverian gelding; dressage competitor

- Breed: Hanoverian
- Sire: Darling (Hanoverian)
- Grandsire: Duft II (Hanoverian)
- Dam: Minuett (Hanoverian)
- Maternal grandsire: Marmor (Hanoverian)
- Sex: Gelding
- Foaled: 1977
- Died: 1989
- Country: Germany
- Colour: Dark bay
- Breeder: Karl Jantzen

Dynasty
Medal record

Summer Olympics
Bronze medal – third place	1988 Seoul	Team dressage

World Cup
Silver medal – second place	1988 Den Bosch	Individual dressage

Dynasty (1977–1989) was a dark bay Hanoverian gelding, ridden for Canada by Cindy Neale-Ishoy in dressage competitions. During their competition career, the pair won medals at the Olympic Games and the World Cup Finals. Dynasty died in 1989 following a colic surgery.

== Early life ==
The dark bay Hanoverian gelding was bred in 1977 by German Karl Jantzen. His sire was Darling and his dam was Minuett (by Marmor). Originally named Disco 16, he was acquired for Canadian Cindy Neale-Ishoy by her long time supporters and sponsors Charles and Janet Burns in 1981. Not happy with his original name, Cindy opted to change it to Dynasty. The new name was inspired by the Peter Newman's book on the rise of Bronfman dynasty in Canada. Although the prime time soap opera of the same name was on the air at the time, Cindy was not aware of its existence, having been living in Germany and having no interest in that kind of show. "The last thing I would ever do is name a horse after a soap.", she once admitted.

== Competitive career ==
Dynasty and Cindy Neale-Ishoy began competing internationally in Europe in 1983. Their early career was marked by inconsistent performances, which were usually deemed as either very good or terrible. The pair made their championships debut at the 1986 World Championships in Cedar Valley, Ontario, where they placed 7th individually. The following year they competed in their first World Cup Finals and finished 4th.

The pair's most fruitful season came in 1988. They improved their World Cup record by finishing second at the Finals in Den Bosch. It was the first and the only time that a Canadian pair has climbed the World Cup Finals podium. Following the early season success, Dynasty and Neale-Ishoy lead Canada to a historic team bronze medal at the 1988 Seoul Olympics. It was the first time that Canada has ever won an Olympic medal in dressage. In the individual competition later on, the pair placed 4th, merely 16 points away from another podium-finish. At a wrap-up cocktail party in Seoul, one judge came up to Cindy and said that the best of Dynasty is yet to come. 1988 competition season, however, proved to be the final one for the pair.

Following the Olympics, Dynasty suffered a tendon injury. He healed and was under saddle again when he suffered a colic attack. A section of his intestine had passed through a lesion in the gut wall. His colic condition was successfully operated on in Guelph, however at some point a blood vessel was ruptured. Dynasty was given over twenty quarts of blood and clotting drugs to try and stop the internal bleeding, but he could not be saved.

== Legacy ==
Cindy Neale-Ishoy fondly remembers Dynasty to this day: “My whole life revolved around what to do with him. Along with Neil and my daughter Kahla, Dynasty was everything. The next morning I didn’t even want to get up.”. Cindy, however, did not take a break from riding, and since that day she has had many highlights in the ring with other horses. For a while it was difficult for her to develop a bond with other horses, as she was always looking for another Dynasty. “What I have learned is that with each new horse you try you have to discipline yourself to accept them for what they are.”, she admitted.

As of 2020, Dynasty's two podium-finishes from 1988 remain to be the only global medals won in the Canadian dressage history.
