= Georg Wahl =

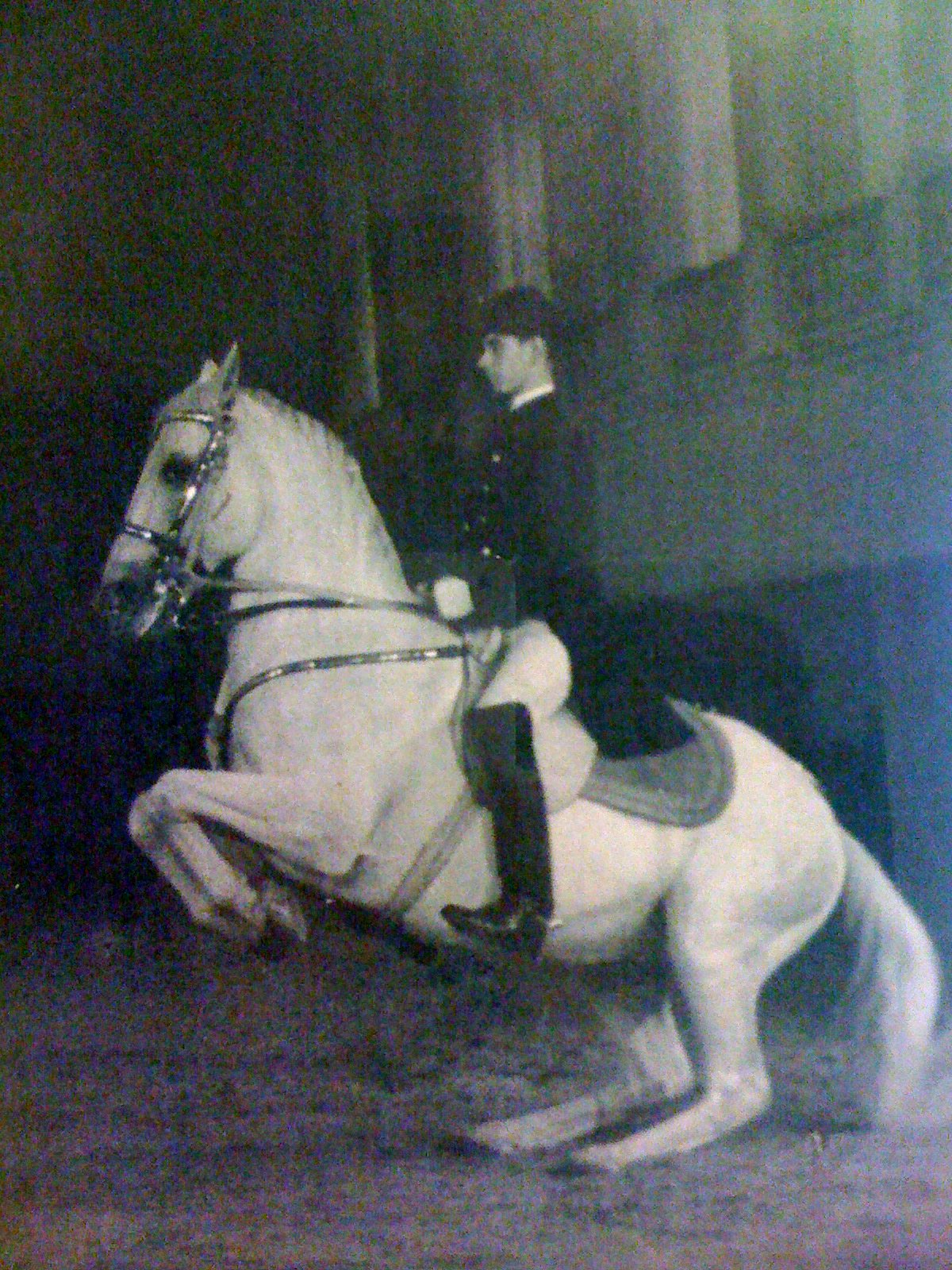
Chief Rider Georg Wahl on Conversano Capriola in the Levade

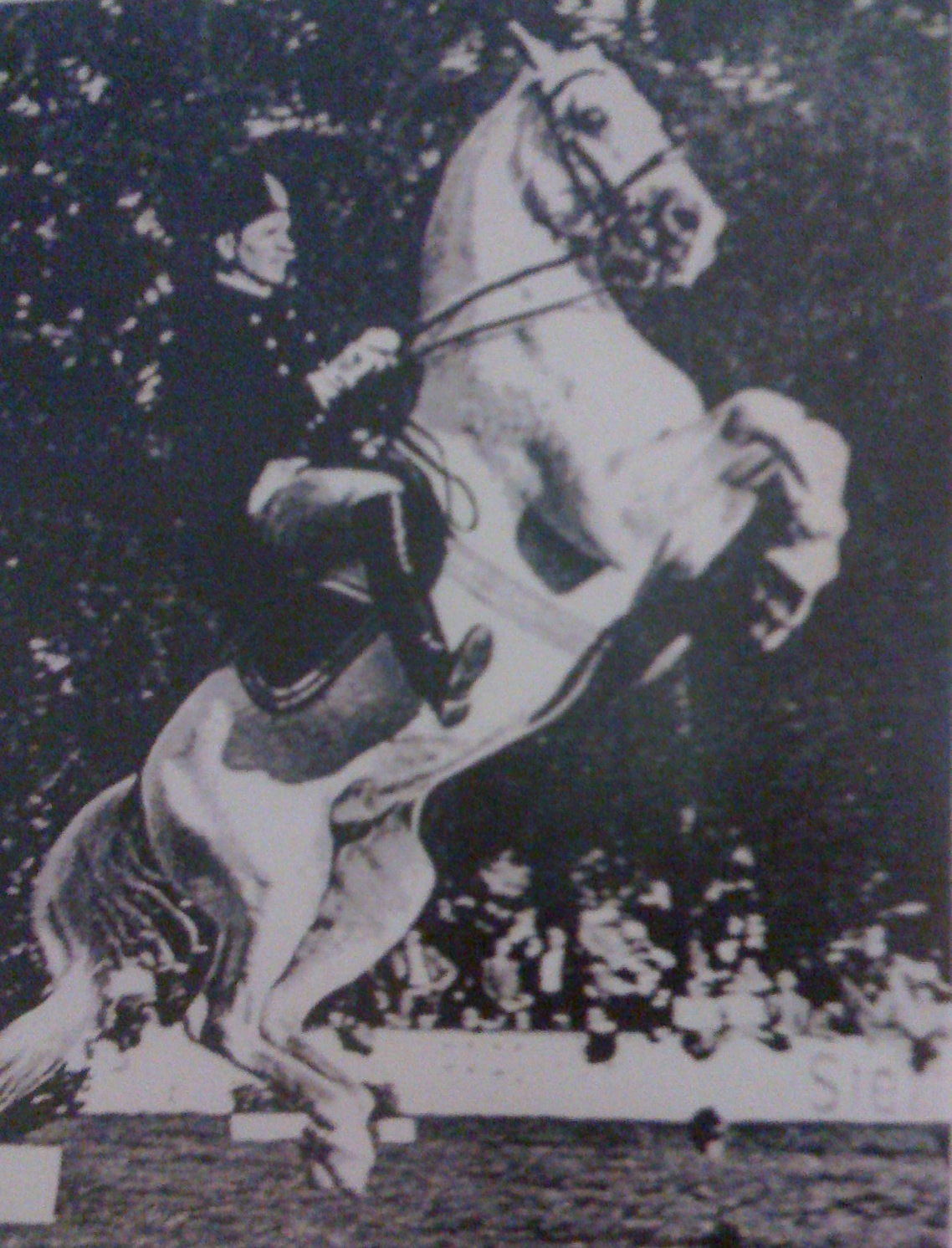
... on Siglavy Brezovica riding the Courbette (1943)

Georg Wahl (Kosel, Upper Silesia, 21 February 1920 – 4 November 2013) was Chief Rider at the Spanish Riding School in Vienna, dressage instructor, rider and trainer. He was also known as the coach and trainer of Swiss Olympic medalist Christine Stückelberger.

He grew up at the Kosel Stud, where his father was a trainer of coach horses. Wahl learned to ride at an early age, mainly bareback.

In 1939, Wahl joined the cavalry of the Wehrmacht, where he was under the command of Hans-Joachim Köhler from Verden. Köhler, who later became known worldwide as an expert in the field of horse training, organised a dressage competition for his troops to improve their morale. Held only 20 km behind the front lines, Wahl showed himself to be the best of the riders present. Alois Podhajsky happened to attend this competition, and in 1940, Podhajsky recruited Wahl to the Spanish Riding School. Because Wahl possessed extraordinary talent and feeling for horses he advanced quickly at the school and within a very short time participated in the School's public performances. From 1938 until 1944 he served as a Rider (Bereiter) at the School.

After a brief period of time away from the School in 1944 to serve at the Russian front in Hungary, and a brief wartime imprisonment, he returned to the Spanish Riding School.

On one of the Tours of the School in Switzerland, Wahl met Fredy Knie, of the famed Circus Knie and left the School in 1951 to work for Knie. For two years, Knie and Wahl performed a widely known Pas de Deux exhibition. In 1955 Wahl took over the Community Riding School (Stadtreitschule) in Bern, Switzerland where he first met Christine Stückelberger.

In 1967 Hans Handler, who succeeded Podhajsky as director of the Spanish Riding School, rehired Wahl, promoting him to Chief Rider (Oberbereiter), where he remained until 1971.

Upon his return to Switzerland in 1971, Wahl devoted himself to the training and promotion of Stückelberger and her Holsteiner gelding Granat. Wahl and Stückelberger eventually became life partners. The horse and rider team of Stückelberger and Granat made dressage history as the most successful performers in international Dressage competition for the nation of Switzerland. They won team silver at the Dressage World Cup in Copenhagen 1974, individual gold at the 1975 European Dressage Championships, and an Equestrian individual gold at the 1976 Montreal Olympics. Following their Olympic win, they took gold again at the 1977 European Dressage Championships and at the 1978 Dressage World Championships in Goodwood.

Georg Wahl was married twice. He and his first wife, Maria, had four children. He also had two daughters from a second marriage. He lived with Stückelberg in Kirchberg near St. Gallen. He remained committed to the classical theory of dressage, and values the preservation and dissemination of classical horsemanship.
