= Dressage judge =

Official that assesses a dressage test

A dressage judge is responsible for assessing a dressage test and is a certified official. The assessment of a dressage test is done at all levels. Dressage depends on judges because they have to judge the rider during their test. A dressage judge is open and transparent and judges what they see at that moment.

A dressage judge must first obtain a certificate to judge. A judge is then a certified official and has the authority to judge official national and if possible international competitions. To become a member of the jury, a judge must undergo education through the national sports federation in the country in which the member of the jury is active. A jury member starts at the bottom of the base, after which he or she educates to a higher level. The form of education differs per national federation. The highest level to judge is the Grand Prix, which is also the highest level in dressage.

Certified national Grand Prix jury members can follow the training to become an international jury member at the FEI if the national federation reports the judge above. The highest level as an international jury member is Level 4 status, formerly known as 'O' jury member or 5* judge. With this status, a Level 4 judge is authorized to judge major championships, such as the World Equestrian Games and the Olympic Games.

== International judge ==
International jury members are authorized to judge at international competitions. It is only possible to become an international jury member if a judge is registered by the national federation to follow the training as an international jury member at the FEI. The FEI is the umbrella organization for equestrian sports that is responsible for training and supervising the jury members. Only certified FEI jury members have the authority to judge international competitions. The international competitions are only organized by the FEI and are known as Concours de Dressage International.

There are four different levels as an FEI judge:

- Level 1 Judge (This is the entry-level for national judges who do not have a Grand Prix Education system in their country)

Level 1 judges are licensed to judge international through Prix st. George and Intermediate I level with a limited range of competitions.

- Level 2 (This is the entry-level for national judges who have a Grand Prix Education System in their country)

Level 2 Judges are licensed to judge international through Grand Prix level, except 4* or higher-level competitions and FEI Championships, World Cups and the Olympic Games.

- Level 3 Judge (Former 'I' or 4* International judge)

Level 3 judges are licensed to judge all international Grand Prix competitions including FEI Championships, except the World Equestrian Games and the Olympic Games

- Level 4 Judge (Former 'O' or 5* Olympic Judge)

Level 4 judges are licensed to judge all international Grand Prix competitions including FEI Championships, World Equestrian Games, and Olympic Games. This is the highest level to reach as an international dressage judge.

=== Dressage judges worldwide ===
There are currently 173 licensed FEI Dressage Judges from different countries worldwide. The list below shows from which countries how many FEI jury members come (in 2026), different from Level 1 to Level 4.

- Algeria (1 judge)
- Argentina (4 Judges)
- Australia (8 Judges)
- Austria (5 Judges)
- Belgium (3 Judges)
- Belarus (2 Judges)
- Brazil (4 Judges)
- Bulgaria (1 Judge)
- Canada (6 Judges)
- Chile (1 Judge)
- China (1 Judge)
- Colombia (2 Judges)
- Croatia (2 Judges)
- Czech Republic (2 Judges)
- Denmark (8 Judges)
- El Salvador (1 Judge)
- Estonia (1 Judge)
- Finland (3 Judges)
- France (12 Judges)
- (United Kingdom) Great Britain (9 Judges)
- Germany (13 Judges)
- Guatemala (1 Judge)
- Honduras (1 Judge)
- Hong Kong (1 Judge)
- Hungary (3 Judges)
- India (1 Judge)
- Israel (1 Judge)
- Italy (4 Judges)
- Japan (1 Judge)
- Lithuania (1 Judge)
- Latvia (1 Judge)
- Luxembourg (2 Judges)
- Malaysia (1 Judge)
- Mexico (3 Judges)
- Netherlands (11 Judges)
- Norway (2 Judges)
- New Zealand (6 Judges)
- Palestine (1 Judge)
- Peru (1 Judge)
- Philippines (1 Judge)
- Poland (5 Judges)
- Portugal (4 Judges)
- South Africa (1 Judge)
- (Russia) Russian Federation (3 Judges)
- Singapore (1 Judge)
- Slovenia (1 Judge)
- Serbia (1 Judge)
- Slovakia (1 Judge)
- Spain (2 Judges)
- Sweden (5 Judges)
- Switzerland (1 Judge)
- Chinese Taipei (1 Judge)
- Ukraine (3 Judges)
- United States of America (12 Judges)

=== Former champion riders became judges ===
All judges must have competed themselves and have exercised a certain level. Many former international competition riders decided to become a judge after their riding career to stay involved in the sport. A number of well-known old top riders, who used to participate in major championships such as European Championships, World Championships or Olympic Games in the past, have now been promoted to become an international jury member. Elisabeth Max-Theurer became Olympic Champion during the 1980 Olympic Games and promoted as judge to Level 4 in 2018. Some other former riders who are now judges are Lars Andersson, Olympian Ricky MacMillan, Sandy Phillips, Marian Cunningham, Lorraine Stubbs, Charlotte Bredahl, Hilda Gurney, Karen Pavicic, Sven Rothenberger, Peter Storr and Jennie Loriston-Clarke are a few who decided to focus on International judging.

== Links ==
- Dressage official education system by the FEI
- List of FEI Officials
