= Buddy Brown =

Buddy Brown can refer to:

- Buddy Brown (equestrian) (born 1956), American Olympic equestrian
- Buddy Brown (musician) (born 1982), American musician
- Buddy Brown (offensive guard) (born 1950), American football player
- Buddy Brown (offensive guard, born 1925) (1925–2004), American football player
