= Stracey =

Stracey is a surname. Notable people with this surname include:

- George Stracey Smyth (1767–1823), commander-in-chief, North America, Lieutenant Governor of Nova Scotia, Lieutenant Governor of New Brunswick
- Barbara Stracey (born 1953), Canadian equestrian
- Chris Stracey, Australian musician, member of electronic music duo Bag Raiders
- Henry Stracey (1802–1885), British Conservative Party politician
- John H. Stracey MBE (born 1950), British professional boxer

== See also ==
- Stracey baronets of Rackheath, Norfolk, a title in the baronetage of the United Kingdom
- Stracey Arms Windpump, windpump located at Tunstall, Halvergate, Norfolk, England
