= 2021 FEI World Cup Finals (show jumping and dressage) =

Horse sport competition

- Host city: Gothenburg, Sweden
- Date(s): 30 March - 4 April 2021
- Main stadium: Scandinavium
- Level: Senior
- Type: Indoor
- Events: 2

The 2021 FEI World Cup Finals for both dressage and show jumping were scheduled to be held between March 30 and April 4, 2021 in Gothenburg, Sweden. The event was to be held in the Scandinavium Arena and should have represented the conclusion of the 2020-21 Dressage and Show jumping World Cup Seasons.

The Finals got cancelled on March 12, due to the EHV-1 outbreak in Europe.

== Overview ==
Due to the COVID-19 pandemic, the 2020 FEI World Cup Finals in Las Vegas got cancelled on short notice. It was the first time that the FEI World Cup Finals got cancelled since their inclusion in 1978 for show jumping, and 1985 for dressage.

The pandemic affected the 2020-21 World Cup Seasons in both dressage and jumping. Numerous qualifiers, including the complete Western European and North American jumping circuits, got scratched. This forced the FEI to introduce new qualifying procedures for the Finals in Gothenburg.

In February 2021, an outbreak of an aggressive strain of the neurological form of Equine Herpes Virus (EHV-1) was reported in Valencia, Spain. This caused the International Equestrian Federation to cancel all competition on the European mainland through March 28. The outbreak put the 2021 FEI World Cup Finals under uncertainty, and the competition eventually got cancelled once the cancellation period got extended to April 11.

== Qualifiers ==
=== Dressage qualifiers ===
The list of qualified athletes was released on March 11, 2021.

World Cup League	Vacancies	Qualified athletes
Western European League	9	(Germany) Jessica von Bredow-Werndl (Germany) Helen Langehanenberg (Sweden) Patrik Kittel (France) Morgan Barbançon (Republic of Ireland) Anna Merveldt (Netherlands) Thamar Zweistra (Austria) Christian Schumach (Denmark) Carina Cassøe Krüth (Israel) Sahar Daniel Hirosh
Central European League	2	(Russia) Regina Isachkina (Hungary) Csaba Szokola
Pacific League	0	—
North American League	2	(United States) Olivia LaGoy-Weltz (United States) Charlotte Jorst
Non-League	1	(Dominican Republic) Yvonne Losos de Muñiz
Defending Champion	1	(Germany) Isabell Werth
FEI Extra Starting Places	2+1	(Sweden) Antonia Ramel (United States) Shelly Francis (Canada) Brittany Fraser-Beaulieu

=== Show jumping qualifiers ===
For the show jumping, due to a number of cancelled qualifiers, most qualification spots for the Finals have been distributed to national federations (NFs) rather than specific athletes. National federations are tasked with the athlete selection.

World Cup League	Vacancies	Qualified athletes
Western European League	Top 11 athletes of the 2019-20 WEL standings (max 2 per nation)	Switzerland; Belgium; Germany; Germany; France (Republic of Ireland) Ireland; Belgium; Italy; Netherlands; Norway (United Kingdom) Great Britain
Western European League	WEL NFs organisers of an FEI World Cup Event	Belgium; Spain; Finland; France (United Kingdom) Great Britain; Germany; Italy; Netherlands; Norway; Switzerland; Sweden
North American League	7+3 US-American competitors	TBD
North American League	2 Canadian competitors	TBD
North American League	2 Mexican competitors	TBD
Arab League	3 from Middle East	(Saudi Arabia) Ramzy Al-Duhami
Arab League	2 from North Africa	(Egypt) Mohd El-Borai
Central European League	3	TBD
South American South League	2	(Brazil) Geronimo Ciavaglia (Brazil) José Roberto Filho
Australian League	2	TBD
Caucasus-Caspian League	1	TBD
Central Asian League	1	TBD
China League	1	TBD
Japan League	1	(Japan) Jun Takada
New Zealand League	1	(New Zealand) Annabel Francis
South African League	1	(South Africa) Christopher van der Merwe
South East Asian League	1	(Indonesia) Steven Menayang
Defending Champion	1	(Switzerland) Steve Guerdat
