= Queen's Award for Equestrianism =

Equestrian

The Queen's Award for Equestrianism is an annual British prize founded in 2005 and awarded "for outstanding services to equestrianism". Nominations are evaluated by a committee formed by chairmen of prominent equestrian associations. Three names are suggested to the board of trustees of the British Horse Society who recommend a recipient to the Queen for ultimate approval.

== Past Recipients ==
Year	Recipient	Note
2006	Jennie Loriston-Clarke MBE FBHS	
2007	The Duke of Edinburgh	
2008	Lars Goran (Yogi) Breisner	
2009	Mrs Jane Holderness-Roddam CBE LVO	
2010	Stephen Clarke FBHS	
2011	Mrs Jane Goldsmith	
2012	Mrs Brenda Larmor	
2013	The Royal Borough of Greenwich	
2014	Pat Campbell	
2015	Carl Hester	
2016	The Princess Royal	
2017	Nick Skelton CBE	
2018	Dr Peter Whitehead	
2020	John McEwen MBE BVMS MRCVS	
2022	Major (Retd) Richard Waygood MBE	
