= Ed Badger =

American basketball player and coach

Biographical details
- Born: November 5, 1930 (age 95); West New York, New Jersey, U.S.

Playing career
- ?–?: Iowa

Coaching career (HC unless noted)
- ?–?: St. Mary's HS (IA)
- ?–?: Marengo HS (IA)
- 1958–1973: Wilbur Wright College
- 1973–1976: Chicago Bulls (asst.)
- 1976–1978: Chicago Bulls
- 1978–1983: Cincinnati
- 1983–1984: Cleveland Cavaliers (asst.)
- 1984–1988: Boston Celtics (asst.)
- 1992–1994: Indiana Pacers (asst.)
- 1994–1996: Miami Heat (asst.)
- 1996–1997: Philadelphia 76ers (asst.)

Accomplishments and honors

Awards
- Metro Coach of the Year (1981)

Ed Badger (born November 5, 1930) is a former college and professional basketball coach.

== Early life ==
Badger played junior varsity college basketball at the University of Iowa, and later for the U.S. Air Force and division teams. He got his first basketball coaching job at St. Mary's High School, while getting his master's degree from the University of Iowa. After receiving his master's degree, Badger moved to Marengo, Iowa to coach the Marengo High School basketball team. He won the conference in his second year.

== Coaching career ==
=== Early jobs ===
Badger then moved up to the college coaching ranks. For the next 15 years he was a very successful head basketball coach at Wilbur Wright College. Badger's teams won 25 or more games ever year he coached. In the 1973–74 and 1974–75 seasons Badger's teams went 33–0 and were ranked number 1 nationally in the polls for junior college teams.

In international basketball, Badger was an Olympic basketball camp coach from 1968 to 1974. He also coached the Austrian national team in 1972 and coached the 1973 U.S. team during the World University Games in Moscow, winning the gold medal.

=== Chicago Bulls ===
Badger joined the Chicago Bulls as a part‐time assistant and head scout in 1973 while still athletic director and coach at Wright. He became a full-time assistant in 1975–76. He was appointed the Bulls' third-ever head coach on August 25, 1976, succeeding Dick Motta who had accepted a similar position with the Washington Bullets three months earlier on May 28. He served in that capacity for two seasons from 1976 to 1978. He had a winning record and made the playoffs in his first season.

=== Cincinnati Bearcats ===
He was head coach of the University of Cincinnati Bearcats' men's basketball team from 1978 to 1983, where he was a two-time Metro Conference coach of the year. On Dec. 21, 1981 Badger's team defeated Bradley 75–73 in a game that went into seven overtime periods.

=== Return to the NBA ===
Badger accepted an assistant coach job with the Cleveland Cavaliers in 1983. He then joined the Boston Celtics as an assistant coach and director of scouting under K.C. Jones in 1984, where he won an NBA championship with the 1985–1986 team, considered by many to be one of the greatest NBA teams of all time.

In 1988 Badger became vice president of basketball operations for the new expansion team Charlotte Hornets, where he stayed until 1990. He joined the Atlanta Hawks as director of scouting from 1990 to 1992. In 1992, he returned as an assistant coach for the Indiana Pacers, followed by assistant coach jobs with Miami Heat and Philadelphia 76ers and a chief scout job for the Minnesota Timberwolves before retiring in 2003.

== Head coaching record ==
=== NBA ===
Legend
Regular season	G	Games coached	W	Games won	L	Games lost	W–L %	Win–loss %
Playoffs	PG	Playoff games	PW	Playoff wins	PL	Playoff losses	PW–L %	Playoff win–loss %

Team	Year	G	W	L	W–L%	Finish	PG	PW	PL	PW–L%	Result
Chicago	1976–77	82	44	38	.537	3rd in Midwest	3	1	2	.333	Lost in First Round
Chicago	1977–78	82	40	42	.488	3rd in Midwest	—	—	—	—	Missed Playoffs
Career		164	84	80	.512		3	1	2	.333	

=== College ===
Record table
Season	Team	Overall	Conference	Standing	Postseason
Cincinnati Bearcats (Metro Conference) (1978–1983)
1978–79	Cincinnati	13–14	4–6	4th	
1979–80	Cincinnati	13–15	3–9	6th	
1980–81	Cincinnati	16–13	6–6	3rd	
1981–82	Cincinnati	15–12	4–8	5th	
1982–83	Cincinnati	11–17	1–11	7th	
Total:		68–71 (.489)			
National champion Postseason invitational champion Conference regular season champion Conference regular season and conference tournament champion Division regular season champion Division regular season and conference tournament champion Conference tournament champion
