= 1977–78 Chicago Bulls season =

NBA professional basketball team season

- Head coach: Ed Badger
- General manager: Jon Kovler
- Owner(s): Arthur Wirtz and Jonathan Kovler
- Arena: Chicago Stadium

Results
- Record: 40–42 (.488)
- Place: Division: 3rd (Midwest); Conference: 8th (Western)
- Playoff finish: Did not qualify
- Stats at Basketball Reference

Local media
- Television: WGN-TV (Lorn Brown, Johnny “Red” Kerr)
- Radio: WIND (Jim Durham, Bill Berg)

The 1977–78 Chicago Bulls season was the Bulls' 12th season in the NBA.

== Draft picks ==
Round	Pick	Player	Position	Nationality	College
1	13	Tate Armstrong	SG	United States	Duke
2	23	Mike Glenn	PG	United States	Southern Illinois
2	30	Steve Sheppard	SF	United States	Maryland
2	35	Mark Landsberger	PF/C	United States	Arizona State
4	79	Mike McConathy		United States	Louisiana Tech
5	101	Nate Davis		United States	South Carolina
6	123	Jay Chessman		United States	Brigham Young
7	143	Mike Smith		United States	Evansville
8	162	Rich Rhodes		United States	Eastern Illinois

== Roster ==
1977–78 Chicago Bulls roster
Players

Pos.	No.	Player	Height	Weight	DOB	From
G	14	Tate Armstrong	6 ft 3 in (1.91 m)	175 lb (79 kg)	1955–10–05	Duke
C	18	Tom Boerwinkle	7 ft 0 in (2.13 m)	265 lb (120 kg)	1945–08–23	Tennessee
F	40	Derrek Dickey	6 ft 7 in (2.01 m)	218 lb (99 kg)	1951–03–20	Cincinnati
C	53	Artis Gilmore	7 ft 2 in (2.18 m)	240 lb (109 kg)	1949–09–21	Jacksonville
G	12	Wilbur Holland	6 ft 0 in (1.83 m)	175 lb (79 kg)	1951–11–08	New Orleans
F	8	Mickey Johnson	6 ft 10 in (2.08 m)	190 lb (86 kg)	1952–08–31	Aurora
F	54	Mark Landsberger	6 ft 8 in (2.03 m)	215 lb (98 kg)	1955–05–21	Arizona State
F	42	Scott May	6 ft 7 in (2.01 m)	215 lb (98 kg)	1954–03–19	Indiana
G	15	John Mengelt	6 ft 2 in (1.88 m)	195 lb (88 kg)	1949–10–16	Auburn
F	32	Cazzie Russell	6 ft 5 in (1.96 m)	218 lb (99 kg)	1944–06–07	Michigan
F	41	Steve Sheppard	6 ft 6 in (1.98 m)	215 lb (98 kg)	1954–03–21	Maryland
G	2	Norm Van Lier	6 ft 1 in (1.85 m)	173 lb (78 kg)	1947–04–01	Saint Francis (PA)
F	13	Nick Weatherspoon	6 ft 7 in (2.01 m)	197 lb (89 kg)	1950–07–20	Illinois

Coaches
Head coach
- Ed Badger
Assistant(s)
- Jerry Sloan
- Bumper Tormohlen

Legend
- (DP) Unsigned draft pick
- (FA) Free agent
- (S) Suspended
- Injured

Roster
Updated: February 17, 1978

== Regular season ==
=== Season standings ===
Midwest Division	W	L	PCT	GB	Home	Road	Div
y-Denver Nuggets	48	34	.585	–	33–8	15–26	11–9
x-Milwaukee Bucks	44	38	.537	4	28–13	16–25	14–6
Chicago Bulls	40	42	.488	8	29–12	11–30	8–12
Detroit Pistons	38	44	.463	10	24–17	14–27	8–12
Indiana Pacers	31	51	.378	17	21–20	10–31	8–12
Kansas City Kings	31	51	.378	17	22–19	9–32	11–9

#	Western Conference				
#	Team	W	L	PCT	GB
1	z-Portland Trail Blazers	58	24	.707	–
2	y-Denver Nuggets	48	34	.585	10
3	x-Phoenix Suns	49	33	.598	9
4	x-Seattle SuperSonics	47	35	.573	11
5	x-Los Angeles Lakers	45	37	.549	13
6	x-Milwaukee Bucks	44	38	.537	14
7	Golden State Warriors	43	39	.524	15
8	Chicago Bulls	40	42	.488	18
9	Detroit Pistons	38	44	.463	20
10	Indiana Pacers	31	51	.378	27
11	Kansas City Kings	31	51	.378	27

z – clinched division title
y – clinched division title
x – clinched playoff spot

=== Game log ===
1977–78 game log
Total: 40–42 (home: 29–12; road: 11–30)
October: 0–0 (home: 0–0; road: 0–0)

Game	Date	Team	Score	High points	High rebounds	High assists	Location Attendance	Record

November : 0–0 (home: 0–0; road: 0–0)

Game	Date	Team	Score	High points	High rebounds	High assists	Location Attendance	Record

December : 0–0 (home: 0–0; road: 0–0)

Game	Date	Team	Score	High points	High rebounds	High assists	Location Attendance	Record

January : 0–0 (home: 0–0; road: 0–0)

Game	Date	Team	Score	High points	High rebounds	High assists	Location Attendance	Record

February : 0–0 (home: 0–0; road: 0–0)

Game	Date	Team	Score	High points	High rebounds	High assists	Location Attendance	Record

March : 0–0 (home: 0–0; road: 0–0)

Game	Date	Team	Score	High points	High rebounds	High assists	Location Attendance	Record

April : 0–0 (home: 0–0; road: 0–0)

Game	Date	Team	Score	High points	High rebounds	High assists	Location Attendance	Record

1977–78 schedule

== Player statistics ==
Legend
GP	Games played	GS	Games started	MPG	Minutes per game
FG%	Field-goal percentage	3P%	3-point field-goal percentage	FT%	Free-throw percentage
RPG	Rebounds per game	APG	Assists per game	SPG	Steals per game
BPG	Blocks per game	PPG	Points per game

Player	GP	GS	MPG	FG%	3P%	FT%	RPG	APG	SPG	BPG	PPG

== Awards and records ==
- Norm Van Lier, NBA All-Defensive Second Team
- Artis Gilmore, NBA All-Defensive Second Team
- Artis Gilmore, NBA All-Star Game

== Transactions ==
=== Free agents ===
Player	Signed	Former team
Nick Weatherspoon	October 11, 1977	Seattle SuperSonics
Jim Ard	December 8, 1977	Boston Celtics
Cazzie Russell	January 23, 1978	Los Angeles Lakers
