= Peter Storr =

British dressage rider (born 1965)

Personal information
- Nationality: British
- Born: Peter Storr; 16 March 1965 (age 61)

Sport
- Country: United Kingdom
- Sport: Equestrian

Achievements and titles
- World finals: 2002 FEI World Equestrian Games

Peter Storr (born 16 March 1965) is a British dressage rider, trainer and judge. Storr competed at the 2001 European Championships in Verden, Germany and at the 2002 FEI World Equestrian Games in Jerez de la Frontera, Spain. He served as first reserve for the British team at the 2000 Olympic Games in Sydney, Australia and at the 2004 Olympic Games in Athens, Greece.

He served for eight years as national coach for the British pony team. During his coaching time the British pony team won two times gold, one time silver and two times bronze.

In 2020, Storr promoted to 5* level as a Dressage judge, the highest level as an international judge in dressage. This appointment allows him to judge at major championships such as European Championships, World Championships, World Cup Finals and Olympic Games. He is also director of Judges of the British Dressage Board.
