= Samuel Schatzmann =

Swiss equestrian

Personal information
- Born: 12 October 1955
- Died: 2 November 2016 (aged 61)
Medal record
Equestrian
Representing Switzerland
Olympic Games
Silver medal – second place	1988 Seoul	Team dressage
World Championships
Bronze medal – third place	1990 Stockholm	Team dressage
European Championships
Bronze medal – third place	1989 Mondorf	Team dressage

Samuel Schatzmann (12 October 1955 – 2 November 2016) was a Swiss equestrian. He won a silver medal in team dressage at the 1988 Summer Olympics in Seoul, together with Otto Josef Hofer, Christine Stückelberger and Daniel Ramseier. At the 1988 Olympic Games in Seoul, he won on "Rochus" the silver medal in the team dressage together with Otto Hofer, Daniel Ramseier and Christine Stückelberger behind the West German team and in Canada. In the individual dressage he failed to qualify for the final round itself.

A year later Schatzmann won on the same horse bronze medal in the team event at the European Championships Dressage 1989 in Mondorf together with Otto Hofer, Daniel Ramseier and Ulrich Lehmann behind the teams of Germany and the Soviet Republic.

Schatzmann was a doctor of law and entrepreneur. He promoted the Westphalian horse breeding, as a breeder through cooperation with the North Rhine-Westphalian State Stud Warendorf. In 2015 he was awarded for his contribution to the Westphalian breeding the silver badge of honor of Westphalia Stud Book. [1] For several years he was president of the Association Central Swiss Concours riders.
