= Guillermo Pellegrini =

Argentine equestrian

Personal information
- Nationality: Argentine
- Born: 25 November 1945 (age 79)

Sport
- Sport: Equestrian

Guillermo Pellegrini (born 25 November 1945) is an Argentine equestrian. He competed in the individual dressage event at the 1976 Summer Olympics.
