= Daniel Ramseier =

Swiss equestrian

Personal information
- Born: 1963 (age 62–63)
Medal record
Equestrian
Representing Switzerland
Olympic Games
Silver medal – second place	1988 Seoul	Team dressage
World Championships
Bronze medal – third place	1986 Cedar Valley	Team dressage
Bronze medal – third place	1990 Stockholm	Team dressage
European Championships
Silver medal – second place	1987 Goodwood	Team dressage
Bronze medal – third place	1989 Mondorf	Team dressage

Daniel Ramseier (born 29 July 1963) is a Swiss equestrian. He won a silver medal in team dressage at the 1988 Summer Olympics in Seoul, together with Otto Josef Hofer, Christine Stückelberger and Samuel Schatzmann. He also competed at the 2000 Summer Olympics and the 2004 Summer Olympics.
