= Erica Taylor =

Australian equestrian

Personal information
- Born: 8 December 1933 (age 92)

Sport
- Country: Australia
- Sport: Equestrian
- Event: Dressage

Erica Taylor (born 8 December 1933) is a former Australian equestrian.

In 1986 Taylor and Crown Law, a registered Australian stock horse, competed at Cedar Valley, Canada in the World Dressage Championships.

Taylor was only the second Australian to represent her country in dressage when she competed at the Seoul 1988 Olympics in the individual event. Riding Crown Law, she finished in 34th place.

Taylor spent 50 years acting as a dressage judge in Australia, resigning in 2018. She retired from dressage competition in 2007 and lives in Waterloo Corner, South Australia.

Her contribution to dressage in Australia has been recognised by her appointment to the Equestrian Australia Hall of Fame.
