= Kenny Carr =

American basketball player (born 1955)

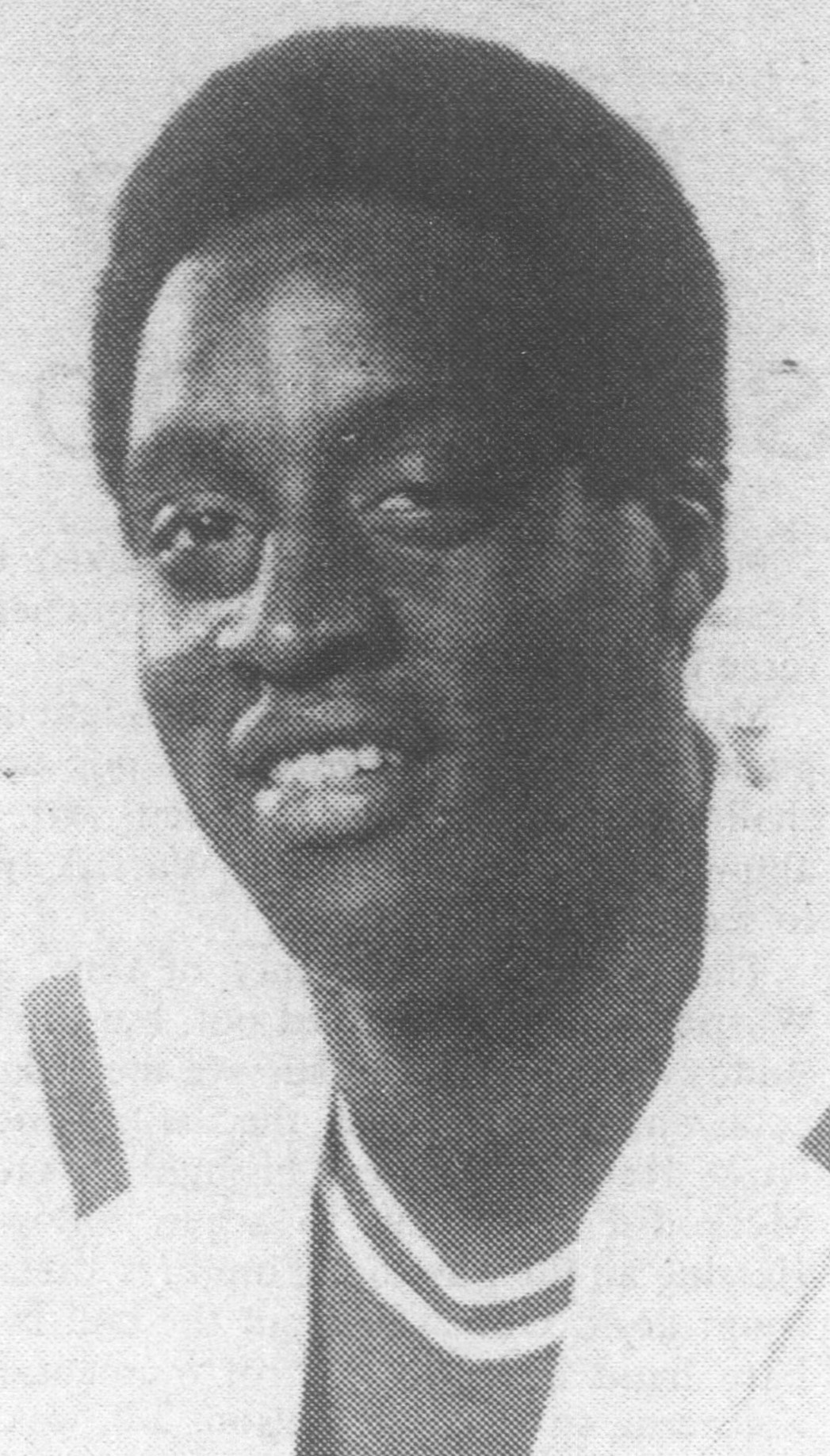

Personal information
- Born: August 15, 1955 (age 71) Washington, D.C., U.S.
- Listed height: 6 ft 7 in (2.01 m)
- Listed weight: 220 lb (100 kg)

Career information
- High school: DeMatha Catholic (Hyattsville, Maryland)
- College: NC State (1974–1977)
- NBA draft: 1977: 1st round, 6th overall pick
- Drafted by: Los Angeles Lakers
- Playing career: 1977–1987
- Position: Power forward
- Number: 2, 7, 32, 34

Career history
- 1977–1979: Los Angeles Lakers
- 1979–1982: Cleveland Cavaliers
- 1982: Detroit Pistons
- 1982–1987: Portland Trail Blazers

Career highlights
- 2× Third-team All-American – UPI (1976, 1977); Third-team All-American – AP, NABC (1976); 2× First-team All-ACC (1976, 1977); No. 32 jersey honored by NC State Wolfpack; First-team Parade All-American (1974)

Career NBA statistics
- Points: 7,813 (11.6 ppg)
- Rebounds: 4,999 (7.4 rpg)
- Assists: 923 (1.4 apg)
- Stats at NBA.com
- Stats at Basketball Reference
Medals
Men's basketball
Representing the United States
| Gold medal – first place | 1976 Montreal | Team competition |

Kenneth Alan Carr (born August 15, 1955) is an American former professional basketball player. Carr was selected in the first round (sixth overall) of the 1977 NBA draft by the Los Angeles Lakers and played ten seasons in the National Basketball Association (NBA).

A 6'7" forward from North Carolina State University, Carr won a gold medal with the United States national basketball team at the 1976 Summer Olympics. Carr played in the NBA from 1977 to 1987 with the Lakers, Cleveland Cavaliers, Detroit Pistons, and Portland Trail Blazers. Carr scored 7,813 (11.6) points in his NBA career and grabbed 4,999 (7.4) rebounds.

== Early years ==
As a youth, Carr was primarily a football player growing up in Washington, D.C., and did not play serious basketball until he was 14-years-old.

"It was kind of by accident, to be honest, but I just fell in love with basketball," Carr recalled. "Plus, back in those days, it was kind of tough to find football shoes that would fit me, to tell the truth."

Carr was a 1974 graduate of DeMatha Catholic in Hyattsville, Maryland, where he played under Hall of Fame coach Morgan Wootten. As a sophomore, he suffered a knee injury. At DeMatha, Carr was teammates with Hall of Famer Adrian Dantley, who graduated a year ahead of Carr. The two would become Olympic teammates and college and NBA rivals. While teammates at DeMatha, Carr and Dantley led DeMatha to a 36-game winning streak.

== College career ==
Carr played at North Carolina State at the varsity level from 1974 to 1977 under coach Norm Sloan.

As a freshman in 1974–1975, Carr averaged 13.8 points and 7.7 rebounds as NC State finished 22–6. NC State was defending National Champions, with Carr playing alongside Hall of Famer David Thompson, Phil Spence, Monte Towe and Tim Stoddard among others.

In 1975–1976 Carr averaged a double-double with 26.6 points, 10.3 rebounds along with 2.1 assists. He led the ACC in scoring as NC State finished 21–9, with Thompson having graduated and moved to the ABA's Denver Nuggets. Carr was named a Third team All-American – UPI, AP and NABC and First-team All-Atlantic Coast Conference.

As a junior, Carr averaged 21.0 points and 9.9 rebounds as NC State finished 17–11 in 1976–1977, with Carr playing alongside freshman Hawkeye Whitney. Carr led the ACC in scoring again and was named a third team All-American – UPI and First-team All-Atlantic Coast Conference. He declared for the NBA draft after the season. "I just thought my body and my game was ready to move on," Carr said of leaving college early. "I was a very physical player and I would get a lot of fouls. I was a little bigger and more aggressive than most people I played against. I got frustrated, and I figured it was time to move on."

In 86 career games for North Carolina State, Carr averaged 20.6 points, 9.2 rebounds, 1.9 assists and 1.5 steals, shooting 51% from the floor and 68% from the line.

"Kenny was a great, great player," reflected long-time N.C. State sports information director Frank Weedon. "But he was so stoic and never showed any emotions, and I think people forget about him. He may have been the second greatest player to ever play here, behind David (Thompson)."

=== 1976 Olympic Team ===
Carr was selected to the 1976 United States men's Olympic basketball team which represented the US in the 1976 Olympic Games in Montreal. Team USA captured the gold medal. Team USA was coached by Dean Smith, assisted by Bill Guthridge and John Thompson.

In six Olympic Games, Carr averaged 6.8 points, 3.2 rebounds and 1.0 assists. Carr was the sixth leading scorer behind his high school teammate Adrian Dantley (19.3), Scott May (16.7), Mitch Kupchak (12.5), Phil Ford (11.3) and Quinn Buckner (7.3). The roster also included future NBA players Walter Davis, Phil Hubbard and Ernie Grunfeld.

"I just enjoyed throwing the ball up with some of the best players in the world," Carr said of his Olympic experience. "The best competition we had was in training camp. I think the best time of the whole thing was when we were in Chapel Hill and we would just get up and play every day. That is the most fun I have ever had."

== Professional career ==
=== Los Angeles Lakers ===
Carr was selected by the Los Angeles Lakers in the first round (6th overall) of the 1977 NBA draft. As a rookie power forward, he broke a metatarsal bone in his left foot in the team's final preseason game. He was lost for over 5 weeks, appearing in 52 games, while averaging 6.2 points and 4.0 rebounds.

On August 3, 1978, he broke his right foot in a pick-up game of basketball before the start of his second season. He recovered to appear in 72 games, averaging 7.4 points and 4.1 rebounds.

In the 1979–80 championship season, he was a backup behind Spencer Haywood and Jim Chones. He appeared in 5 of the first 6 contests, averaging 3.2 points, 3.4 rebounds and 11.4 minutes. On October 24, 1979, he was traded to the Cleveland Cavaliers, in exchange for a 1980 2nd round draft pick (#31-Wayne Robinson) and a 1981 2nd round draft choice (#28-Gene Banks).

In just over two seasons (129 games), he never lived up to his draft expectations, averaging 6.8 points, 4.0 rebounds and 15 minutes of playing time.

=== Cleveland Cavaliers (1979–1982) ===
In the 1979–80 season, he was named a starter at power forward, raising his averages to 11.8 points and 7.4 rebounds. In the 1980–81 season, he was the league's sixth-leading rebounder with a 10.3 average, while scoring 15.2 points per contest.

On February 16, 1982, he was traded along with Bill Laimbeer to the Detroit Pistons, in exchange for power forward Phil Hubbard, center Paul Mokeski, a 1982 1st round draft pick (#12-John Bagley) and a 1982 2nd round draft choice (#28-Dave Magley). In 201 games with the Cleveland Cavaliers, he averaged 14.1 points and 9.0 rebounds.

=== Detroit Pistons ===
In 28 games with the Detroit Pistons, Carr averaged 7.4 points and 4.9 rebounds. On June 23, 1982, he was traded to the Portland Trail Blazers, in exchange for a 1982 1st round draft pick (#18-Ricky Pierce).

=== Portland Trail Blazers ===
In the 1983–84 season, he averaged 15.6 points and 7.8 rebounds. In the 1985–86 season, he missed 27 games with a cartilage tear in his right knee, but still managed to post 11.1 points and 8.9 rebounds per contest.

In the 1986–87 season, he averaged 10.8 points and 10.2 rebounds. In 316 games with the Portland Trail Blazers, Carr averaged 12.4 points and 8.1 rebounds. On January 18, 1987, he suffered a herniated disc injury against the Golden State Warriors, that forced him to miss 34 games. On August 31, 1987, he couldn't recover from the injury and announced his retirement.

"To me, Kenny was one of those players that was ahead of his time," said former North Carolina, NBA rival and 1976 Olympic teammate Phil Ford about Carr. "Now, it's not uncommon to see someone with Kenny's size and strength with the ability to play on the perimeter and knock in jump shots or put the ball on the deck and drive to the basket. When we were coming along, guys with Kenny's strength and size always played inside. He was just a little before his time."

== NBA Career totals ==
In 674 career games, Carr scored 7,813 (11.6) points, had 4,999 (7.4) rebounds. He shot 51% from the floor and 68% from the line.

== NBA career statistics ==
Legend
| GP | Games played | GS | Games started | MPG | Minutes per game |
| FG% | Field goal percentage | 3P% | 3-point field goal percentage | FT% | Free throw percentage |
| RPG | Rebounds per game | APG | Assists per game | SPG | Steals per game |
| BPG | Blocks per game | PPG | Points per game | **Bold** | Career high |
| * | Led the league |

=== Regular season ===
| Year | Team | GP | GS | MPG | FG% | 3P% | FT% | RPG | APG | SPG | BPG | PPG |
|---|---|---|---|---|---|---|---|---|---|---|---|---|
| 1977–78 | L.A. Lakers | 52 | — | 14.1 | .444 | — | .647 | 4.0 | .5 | .3 | .3 | 6.2 |
| 1978–79 | L.A. Lakers | 72 | — | 16.0 | .500 | — | .606 | 4.1 | .8 | .5 | .4 | 7.4 |
| 1979–80 | L.A. Lakers | 5 | — | 11.4 | .438 | — | **1.000** | 3.4 | .2 | .4 | .2 | 3.2 |
| 1979–80 | Cleveland | 74 | — | 24.1 | .493 | .000 | .655 | 7.7 | 1.0 | .9 | **.7** | 12.3 |
| 1980–81 | Cleveland | 81 | — | **32.3** | .511 | .000 | .714 | **10.3** | **2.4** | .9 | .5 | 15.2 |
| 1981–82 | Cleveland | 46 | 42 | 32.2 | .517 | .111 | .659 | 8.6 | 1.4 | **1.3** | .3 | 15.0 |
| 1981–82 | Detroit | 28 | 6 | 15.9 | .458 | .000 | .646 | 4.9 | .8 | .2 | .2 | 7.4 |
| 1982–83 | Portland | **82** | 26 | 28.4 | .505 | **.333** | .697 | 7.2 | 1.4 | .8 | .5 | 12.0 |
| 1983–84 | Portland | **82*** | **57** | 29.9 | **.561** | .000 | .673 | 7.8 | 1.9 | .8 | .4 | **15.6** |
| 1984–85 | Portland | 48 | 30 | 23.3 | .523 | .000 | .720 | 6.7 | 1.2 | .5 | .4 | 10.4 |
| 1985–86 | Portland | 55 | 31 | 28.3 | .498 | .000 | .687 | 8.9 | 1.3 | .7 | .5 | 11.1 |
| 1986–87 | Portland | 49 | 43 | 29.4 | .504 | .000 | .746 | 10.2 | 1.7 | .6 | .3 | 10.8 |
| Career | | 674 | 235 | 25.5 | .510 | .079 | .684 | 7.4 | 1.4 | .7 | .4 | 11.6 |

=== Playoffs ===
| Year | Team | GP | GS | MPG | FG% | 3P% | FT% | RPG | APG | SPG | BPG | PPG |
|---|---|---|---|---|---|---|---|---|---|---|---|---|
| 1978 | L.A. Lakers | 2 | — | 8.5 | .333 | — | — | 2.0 | .0 | .5 | .0 | 3.0 |
| 1979 | L.A. Lakers | 8 | — | 14.6 | .543 | — | .625 | 2.1 | .5 | .5 | .3 | 5.4 |
| 1983 | Portland | 7 | — | 24.4 | .433 | — | .783 | 7.3 | 1.4 | .4 | **.7** | 10.0 |
| 1984 | Portland | 5 | — | **36.0** | .525 | — | .632 | 7.0 | 1.2 | .4 | .4 | **14.8** |
| 1985 | Portland | **9** | **9** | 29.4 | .526 | .000 | **.800** | 7.8 | 1.1 | .3 | .2 | 12.9 |
| 1986 | Portland | 4 | 4 | 35.8 | **.571** | .000 | .733 | **13.3** | **1.8** | **1.3** | .3 | **14.8** |
| Career | | 35 | 13 | 25.5 | .512 | .000 | .729 | 6.6 | 1.1 | .5 | .3 | 10.5 |

== Personal life ==
Carr, married wife Adrianna in 1979. They raised three children: Cameron, Devon and Alyx.

Carr earned a Bachelor's Degree in Education from North Carolina State, finishing his degree while he was a rookie with the Lakers.

Carr became CEO of Carr Construction in Portland, Oregon. He started the now 110 employee company out of his basement in 1987, while playing with the Trail Blazers.

Carr had intended to return to his hometown of Washington, D.C., but the success of his business and his three children has kept him in Oregon."My kids liked being here, and we were settled," Carr said. "Once that happens, you don't necessarily live your life for yourself anymore. You make compromises."

Today, at Carr Construction, Carr works alongside his son, Devon Carr, a graduate of Oregon State University with a degree in engineering.

== Honors ==
- Carr's #32 jersey is honored by NC State Wolfpack men's basketball.
- In 1998, Carr was inducted into the DeMatha Catholic High School Hall of Fame.
