= Phil Hubbard =

American basketball player and coach

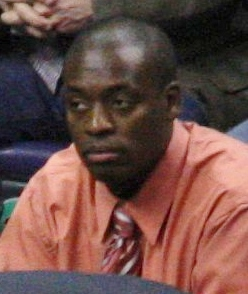
- Hubbard in 2008

Personal information
- Born: December 13, 1956 (age 69) Canton, Ohio, U.S.
- Listed height: 6 ft 8 in (2.03 m)
- Listed weight: 215 lb (98 kg)

Career information
- High school: Canton McKinley (Canton, Ohio)
- College: Michigan (1975–1979)
- NBA draft: 1979: 1st round, 15th overall pick
- Drafted by: Detroit Pistons
- Playing career: 1979–1989
- Position: Power forward / center
- Number: 35
- Coaching career: 1997–2018

Career history

Playing
- 1979–1982: Detroit Pistons
- 1982–1989: Cleveland Cavaliers

Coaching
- 1997–2000: Atlanta Hawks (assistant)
- 2000–2003: Golden State Warriors (assistant)
- 2003–2009: Washington Wizards (assistant)
- 2011: Dominican Republic
- 2011–2013: Los Angeles D-Fenders (assistant)
- 2013–2014: Santa Cruz Warriors (assistant)
- 2014–2015: Los Angeles D-Fenders
- 2015–2018: Jeonju KCC Egis (assistant)

Career highlights
- Consensus second-team All-American (1977); No. 35 retired by Michigan Wolverines

Career NBA statistics
- Points: 7,228 (10.9 ppg)
- Rebounds: 3,538 (5.3 rpg)
- Assists: 857 (1.3 apg)
- Stats at NBA.com
- Stats at Basketball Reference
Medals
Representing United States
Men's Basketball
Olympic Games
Gold medal – first place	1976 Montreal	Team competition

Philip Gregory Hubbard (born December 13, 1956) is an American former professional basketball player and coach. He won a gold medal in the 1976 Summer Olympics and after graduating from the University of Michigan, played for the Detroit Pistons and Cleveland Cavaliers of the National Basketball Association (NBA) from 1979 to 1989. Hubbard later served as an assistant coach for the Washington Wizards from 2003 to 2009 and as the head coach of the Los Angeles D-Fenders in 2014–15.

== High school career ==
Hubbard played high school basketball at Canton McKinley High School in Canton, Ohio. He was named Ohio player of the year in 1975 while at McKinley.

=== College career ===
He played college basketball for the Michigan Wolverines under Coach Johnny Orr.

As a freshman at Michigan, he helped lead the Wolverines to the 1976 NCAA Championship Game against Indiana University. Hubbard averaged 15.1 points and 11.0 rebounds, playing alongside Rickey Green as the Wolverines had the second-place finish at the 1976 NCAA Championship.

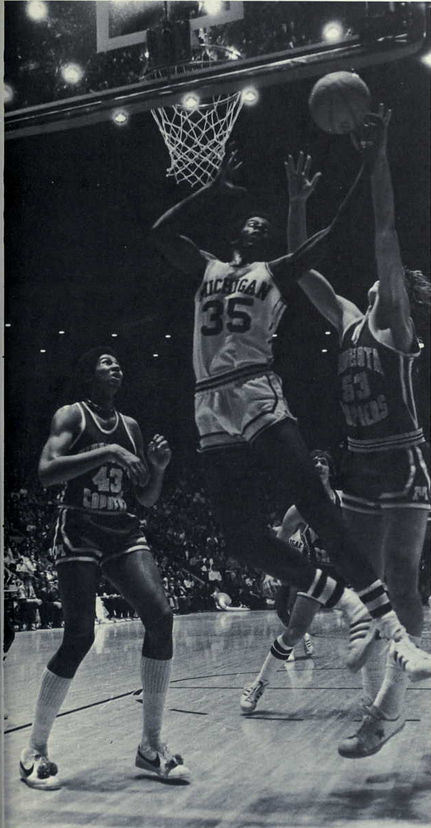
Phil Hubbard, 1976. University of Michigan Yearbook.

Hubbard was an All-American in 1977, leading the Wolverines (26–4) to the Big Ten championship. Hubbard averaged 19.5 points and 13.0 rebounds. His 389 total rebounds in the 1976–77 season remains the single season record at Michigan.

A serious knee injury, suffered in the World University Games, required surgery and forced Hubbard to miss his entire junior year at Michigan, The knee injury would affect the rest of his career.

In 88 career games at Michigan (1975–1979), Hubbard averaged a double-double of 16.5 points and 11.1 rebounds on 53% shooting from the floor and 63% from the line.

=== 1976 Olympic Team ===
Hubbard was a member of the Team USA, the 1976 United States men's Olympic basketball team that won the gold medal in the 1976 Olympic Games under Coach Dean Smith. Hubbard averaged 4.7 points and 3.8 rebounds on 52% shooting from the floor and 100% from the line during the Olympics. Hubbard had 10 points in the gold medal game against Yugoslavia.

== NBA career ==
=== Detroit (1979–1982) ===
Hubbard was selected by the Detroit Pistons in the 1st round (15th overall) in the 1979 NBA draft. Despite having a year of NCAA eligibility remaining due to his injury, Hubbard had declared himself for the NBA Draft.

Hubbard played in 196 games with the Pistons over 3 seasons, averaging 11.6 points, 6.0 rebounds and 1.5 assists in 23 minutes.

=== Cleveland Cavaliers (1982–1989) ===
On February 16, 1982, Hubbard was traded by the Detroit Pistons with Paul Mokeski, a 1982 1st round draft pick (John Bagley was later selected) and a 1982 2nd round draft pick (Dave Magley was later selected) to the Cleveland Cavaliers for Kenny Carr and Bill Laimbeer.

In 8 seasons and 469 games with the Cavaliers, Hubbard averaged 10.6 points, 5.0 rebounds and 1.2 assists in 24 minutes.

Overall, Hubbard averaged 10.9 points, 5.3 rebounds and 1.3 assists in 665 career NBA games.

== Career statistics ==
Legend
GP	Games played	GS	Games started	MPG	Minutes per game
FG%	Field goal percentage	3P%	3-point field goal percentage	FT%	Free throw percentage
RPG	Rebounds per game	APG	Assists per game	SPG	Steals per game
BPG	Blocks per game	PPG	Points per game	**Bold**	Career high

=== NBA ===
==== Regular season ====
Year	Team	GP	GS	MPG	FG%	3P%	FT%	RPG	APG	SPG	BPG	PPG
1979–80	Detroit	64	—	18.6	.466	.000	.750	5.0	1.1	.8	.2	9.1
1980–81	Detroit	80	—	28.6	.492	**.333**	.690	**7.3**	1.9	1.0	**.3**	14.5
1981–82	Detroit	52	38	21.2	.505	.000	.650	5.2	1.3	.7	**.3**	10.0
1981–82	Cleveland	31	2	23.7	.467	.000	.726	6.5	.8	.9	.1	10.4
1982–83	Cleveland	**82**	38	23.8	.482	.000	.689	5.7	1.1	**1.1**	.1	9.5
1983–84	Cleveland	80	6	22.5	.511	.000	.739	4.8	1.1	.9	.1	10.8
1984–85	Cleveland	76	55	29.6	.505	.000	**.751**	6.3	1.5	**1.1**	.1	**15.8**
1985–86	Cleveland	23	21	27.8	.470	.000	.679	5.2	1.3	.9	.1	11.4
1986–87	Cleveland	68	**68**	**30.6**	**.531**	.000	.596	5.7	**2.0**	1.0	.1	11.8
1987–88	Cleveland	78	59	20.9	.489	.000	.749	3.6	1.0	.6	.1	8.4
1988–89	Cleveland	31	0	6.2	.444	—	.680	1.3	.4	.2	.0	2.4
Career		665	287	23.9	.495	.038	.706	5.3	1.3	.9	.1	10.9

=== Playoffs ===
Year	Team	GP	GS	MPG	FG%	3P%	FT%	RPG	APG	SPG	BPG	PPG
1985	Cleveland	**4**	**4**	**25.3**	**.553**	**1.000**	**.765**	**5.0**	**.8**	**.8**	.0	**15.5**
1988	Cleveland	3	0	7.0	.167	—	.000	1.0	.0	.0	.0	.7
1989	Cleveland	1	0	1.0	—	—	—	.0	.0	.0	.0	.0
Career		8	4	15.4	.490	1.000	.722	2.9	.4	.4	.0	8.0

== Coaching career ==
After first serving as an NBA scout after his playing career ended, Hubbard became an assistant coach in the NBA. From 1997 to 2009 Hubbard was an assistant coach with the Atlanta Hawks (1997–2000), Golden State Warriors (2000–2003) and Washington Wizards (2003–2009).

From 2011 to 2014, Hubbard coached in the NBA G League as an assistant coach with the Los Angeles D-Fenders and Santa Cruz Warriors and before becoming Head Coach of the Los Angeles D-Fenders/South Bay Lakers in 2014–2015.

In 2015, Hubbard was hired as an assistant coach for Jeonju KCC Egis in the Korean Basketball League in South Korea.

== Personal ==
Hubbard graduated in 1979 from Michigan with a degree in education.

Hubbard's son, Maurice, played college basketball for Ball State and USC Aiken and played high school basketball at Westfield High School in Chantilly, Virginia, a suburb of Washington, D.C.

Hubbard's daughter, Whitney, is a graduate of Hampton University and played high school volleyball also for Westfield High School.

== Honors ==
- In 1992, Hubbard was inducted into the University of Michigan Hall of Honor.
- Hubbard's #35 jersey was retired by the University of Michigan in 2004.
- Hubbard was inducted into the Ohio Basketball Hall of Fame in 2008.

== See also ==
- University of Michigan Athletic Hall of Honor
