= Diana Mason (equestrian) =

British equestrian

Personal information
- Nationality: British
- Born: 29 April 1933 Knowle, England
- Died: 29 March 2016 (aged 82)

Sport
- Sport: Equestrian
Medal record
Equestrian
Representing Great Britain
European Championships
Gold medal – first place	1954 Basel	Team eventing
Gold medal – first place	1955 Windsor	Team eventing

Diana Mason, OBE (29 April 1933 – 29 March 2016) was a British equestrian. She was part of the Great Britain team that won gold in the team event at the European Eventing Championships in 1954 and 1955. She also competed at the 1976 Summer Olympics and the 1988 Summer Olympics.

== Biography ==
Mason was born in Knowle, in the West Midlands in 1933. She started to ride horses from a young age and got her first horse when she was seventeen years old. In 1954, Mason became the first woman to be selected for the British three day eventing team. In the same year, she won gold at the European Eventing Championships.

Mason competed at two Olympic Games. At the 1976 Summer Olympics in Montreal, she competed in the individual and team dressage events, finishing in 25th and 8th places respectively. Twelve years later, at the 1988 Summer Olympics in Seoul, she competed in the same two events, finishing in 37th place in the individual event, and 10th in the team event. Mason was also a reserve for the 1984 Summer Olympics in Los Angeles.

She retired from competing in 1991. From 1975 to 1992, Mason was the chair of the British Horse Society Dressage Group, and she was the team manager for Great Britain at the 1996 Summer Paralympics in Atlanta. Mason continued to judge events until 2013.

In January 2008, Mason was named an OBE for services to equestrian sport in the New Year Honours. She died in March 2016, at the age of 82.
