= María Paula Bernal =

Colombian equestrian (born 1971)

Personal information
- Nationality: Colombian
- Born: 13 October 1971 (age 53)

Sport
- Sport: Equestrian

María Paula Bernal (born 13 October 1971) is a Colombian equestrian. She competed in the individual dressage event at the 1988 Summer Olympics.
