= James Walsh (equestrian) =

Irish equestrian

Personal information
- Nationality: Irish
- Born: 26 September 1948 (age 76)

Sport
- Sport: Equestrian

James Walsh (born 26 September 1948) is an Irish equestrian. He competed in the individual dressage event at the 1988 Summer Olympics.
