= Marjolijn Greeve =

Dutch equestrian

Personal information
- Nationality: Dutch
- Born: 21 July 1938; Wassenaar, Netherlands
- Died: 5 November 2023 (aged 85); Saint-Légier, Switzerland

Sport
- Sport: Equestrian

Marjolijn Greeve (21 July 1938 – 5 November 2023) was a Dutch equestrian. She competed in the individual dressage event at the 1976 Summer Olympics.
