= Louky van Olphen-van Amstel =

Dutch equestrian

Personal information
- Nationality: Dutch
- Born: 14 April 1934 (age 90); Haarlem, Netherlands

Sport
- Sport: Equestrian

Louky van Olphen-van Amstel (born 14 April 1934) is a Dutch equestrian. She competed in the individual dressage event at the 1976 Summer Olympics.
