= Sarah Whitmore =

British equestrian (1931–2021)

Personal information
- Nationality: British
- Born: 9 August 1931
- Died: 27 March 2021 (aged 89)

Sport
- Sport: Equestrian

Sarah Whitmore (9 August 1931 – 27 March 2021) was a British equestrian.

Whitmore started her career with eventing, but switched to dressage after breaking her back due to a fall at the Badminton Horse Trials. She competed at the 1966 World Championships and was a substitute for the 1968 Summer Olympics. Her coach was Hans von Blixen-Finecke Jr. She competed in the individual dressage event at the 1976 Summer Olympics. She won in 1976 the national title in the Grand Prix. She later competed at the 1978 and 1982 World Championships.

Whitmore lived at the Hilders Farm in Edenbridge. Her mother Charlotte Fry worked as a working student for Whitmore. Whitmore died on 27 March 2021, aged 89.
