= Annabel Francis =

Personal information
- Nationality: New Zealand
- Born: Novokuznetsk, Siberia

Sport
- Sport: Equestrian

Annabel Francis is a New Zealand show jumper who won the Show Jumping FEI World Cup competition in New Zealand in 2021.

== Early life ==
Francis was born in Russia. She was in an orphanage in Novokuznetsk, Siberia, when three months old she was brought to New Zealand. Her older sister Charlotte had been adopted from an orphanage in Archangel in north-west Russia 18 months previously by Debbie Francis. Her husband, a Canterbury, New Zealand horse man Wayne Francis, had died of cancer and they had been trying to have children. One day she confided in a friend that above all she wanted children. “She said there’s plenty of children out there who need a mother,” within New Zealand, officials categorised her as a single mother, although widowed, and therefore ineligible to adopt. The rest of their childhood was spent primarily in Christchurch, before the family moved north to Kinloch, on the western side of Lake Taupō. Her mum had been a dressage rider. Her sister Charlotte also rides but is now studying veterinary science. Mum Debbie Francis first placed Annabel in the saddle of a black-and-white pony, Gidgit, when she was just a few months old. On March 5, 2008, as a 5-year-old, Annabel featured on the front-page edition of Hawke's Bay Today under the headline of "Tomorrow's champion".

== Show jumping career ==
Francis began competing at World Cup level and has held an FEI ranking since January 2020. Francis took the overall win in the New Zealand FEI Show Jumping World Cup league as well as winning the final event at Woodhill Sands in Auckland in January 2021 on her horse Carado GHP. She also won 2 league events in 2021 on her horse La Quanira. The winner of the New Zealand League would usually have the opportunity to represent the nation at the Show Jumping World Cup finals which was scheduled to be held March 31 – April 5, 2021, in Gothenburg, Sweden but that event was cancelled for the second successive year.

Francis finished her 2021 season with victory at Glistening Waters, the Premier League series finals championship, aboard her horse La Quinara. She finished with the Premier League Series, World Cup NZ Series, the Young Rider Series and the Top-ranking Mare award.

In August 2021 she was awarded Rider of The Year over equestrians nationwide in every discipline.
