= Ashley Holzer =

Canadian equestrian (born 1963)

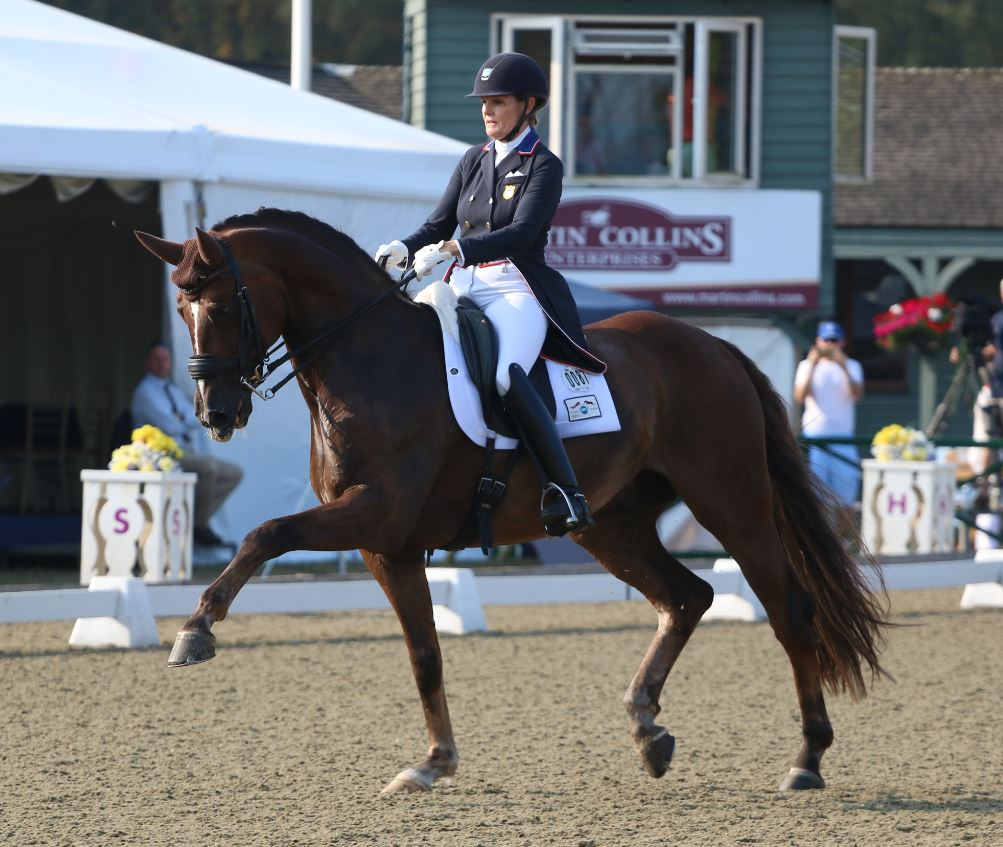
- Holzer in 2018

Personal information
- Born: 10 October 1963 (age 62) Toronto, Ontario, Canada
Medal record
Equestrian
Representing Canada
Olympic Games
Bronze medal – third place	1988 Seoul	Team dressage
Pan American Games
Silver medal – second place	2003 Santo Domingo	Team dressage

Ashley Holzer (née Nicoll; born 10 October 1963) is a Canadian-born equestrian specializing in dressage, who has been representing the United States since 2017. She was born in Toronto, the daughter of Moreen and Ian Nicoll, and is married to Charles Holzer. Representing Canada, she won a bronze medal in team dressage at the 1988 Summer Olympics in Seoul, together with teammates Cynthia Neale-Ishoy, Eva Pracht and Gina Smith. She also competed at the 2004, 2008 and 2012 Summer Olympics.

== Personal life ==
Ashley is married to Charles “Rusty” Holzer, who competed for the United States Virgin Islands at the 1992 Summer Olympics in show-jumping. She has two children; Harrison Holzer and Emma Holzer, who are both film actors. Holzer became a citizen of the United States in February 2016. Jane Holzer is her mother-in-law.

== Notable Horses ==
- Reipo
  - 1988 Summer Olympics - Team Bronze, Individual 16th Place
- Imperioso - 1990 Chestnut Dutch Warmblood Stallion (Cocktail x Tangelo)
  - 2002 World Equestrian Games - Individual 38th Place
  - 2003 Open European Championships - Individual 27th Place
  - 2004 Summer Olympics - Team 9th Place, Individual 42nd Place
- Gambol - 1994 Bay Dutch Warmblood Stallion (Gabor x Lector)
  - 2006 World Equestrian Games - Individual 45th Place
- Pop Art - 1997 Chestnut Dutch Warmblood Gelding (Amsterdam x Cabochon)
  - 2008 Summer Olympics - Team 8th Place, Individual 12th Place
  - 2009 World Cup - Individual 5th Place
  - 2010 World Equestrian Games - Team 7th Place, Individual Special 11th Place, Individual Freestyle 8th Place
- Breaking Dawn - 2001 Bay Dutch Warmblood Gelding (Akribori x Ronald)
  - 2012 Summer Olympics - Team 10th Place, Individual 24th Place
