= George Teodorescu =

Romanian equestrian

Gheorghe Teodorescu
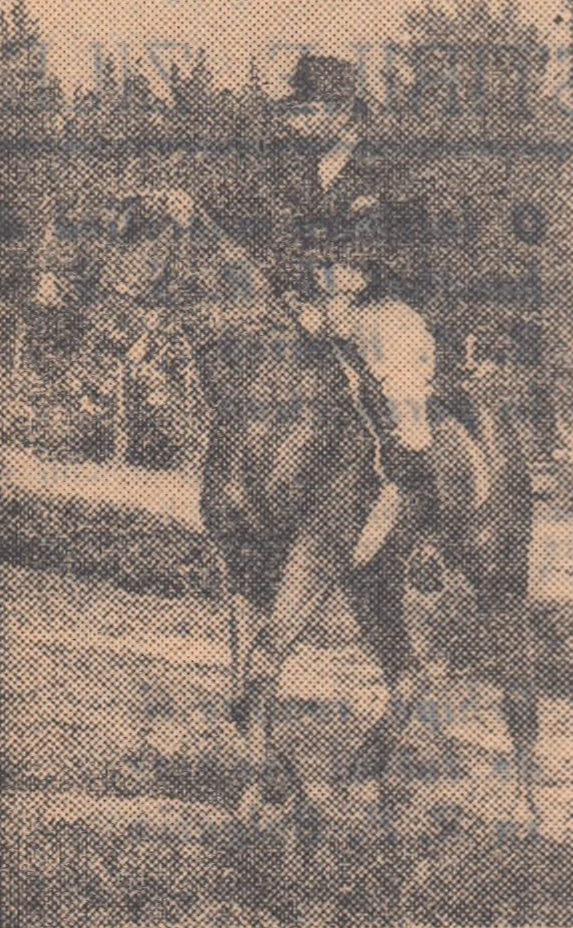
- George Teodorescu in 1957

Personal information
- Nationality: Romanian
- Born: 1 October 1925 Făgăraș, Romania
- Died: 21 August 2007 (aged 81) Nordrhein-Westfalen, Germany

Sport
- Sport: Equestrian
Medal record
Equestrian
Representing West Germany
World Cup
Bronze medal – third place	1987 Essen	Individual dressage

George Teodorescu (1 October 1925 – 21 August 2007) was a Romanian equestrian. He competed in two events at the 1956 Summer Olympics. A native of Romania, Theodorescu moved to Germany at age 31 as a political refugee. His daughter Monica is a three-time Olympic team gold medalist as part of the German dressage team, and twice World Cup champion.

== Bibliography ==
- Collins, David (2006) [2006]. "George Theodorescu". Dressage Masters. Guilford, Connecticut: The Lyons Press. pp. 109–148. ISBN 978-159228-674-4.
