= Tate Armstrong =

American basketball player (born 1955)

Personal information
- Born: October 5, 1955 (age 71) Moultrie, Georgia, U.S.
- Listed height: 6 ft 3 in (1.91 m)
- Listed weight: 175 lb (79 kg)

Career information
- High school: Spring Woods (Houston, Texas)
- College: Duke (1973–1977)
- NBA draft: 1977: 1st round, 13th overall pick
- Drafted by: Chicago Bulls
- Playing career: 1977–1979
- Position: Shooting guard
- Number: 14

Career history
- 1977–1979: Chicago Bulls

Career highlights
- First-team All-ACC (1976)
- Stats at NBA.com
- Stats at Basketball Reference
Medals
Men's basketball
Representing United States
Olympic Games
Gold medal – first place	1976 Montreal	Team competition

Michel Taylor "Tate" Armstrong (born October 5, 1955) is an American former professional basketball player.

A 6'3" guard from Duke University, Armstrong won a gold medal with the United States national basketball team at the 1976 Summer Olympics. He was selected by the Chicago Bulls with the 13th pick of the 1977 NBA draft and played two years with the Bulls, averaging 3.8 points, 1.1 assists, and 1.0 rebounds per game.

He has been a real estate developer in the DC area since 1998, and has seven children.

== Career statistics ==
Legend
GP	Games played	GS	Games started	MPG	Minutes per game
FG%	Field goal percentage	3P%	3-point field goal percentage	FT%	Free throw percentage
RPG	Rebounds per game	APG	Assists per game	SPG	Steals per game
BPG	Blocks per game	PPG	Points per game	**Bold**	Career high
†	Won an NBA championship

=== NBA ===
==== Regular season ====
Year	Team	GP	MPG	FG%	FT%	RPG	APG	SPG	BPG	PPG
1977–78	Chicago	**66**	**10.8**	**.468**	**.815**	**1.0**	1.1	.3	.0	**4.3**
1978–79	Portland	26	10.0	.400	.769	.8	**1.2**	**.4**	.0	2.5
Career		92	10.6	.454	.800	1.0	1.1	.4	.0	3.8
