= Steve Sheppard =

American basketball player (born 1954)

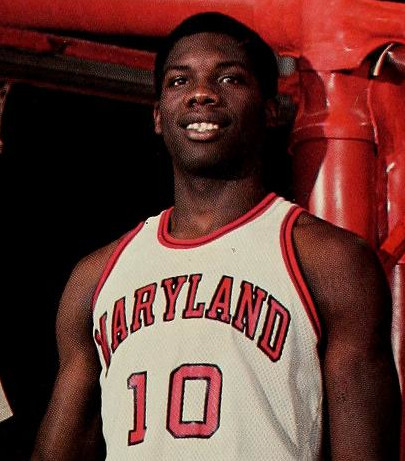
- Sheppard in 1976

Personal information
- Born: March 21, 1954 (age 72) New York City, New York, U.S.
- Listed height: 6 ft 6 in (1.98 m)
- Listed weight: 215 lb (98 kg)

Career information
- High school: DeWitt Clinton (New York City, New York)
- College: Maryland (1974–1977)
- NBA draft: 1977: 2nd round, 30th overall pick
- Drafted by: Chicago Bulls
- Playing career: 1977–1980
- Position: Small forward
- Number: 41, 10, 27

Career history
- 1977–1979: Chicago Bulls
- 1979: Detroit Pistons
- 1979–1980: Eldorado Roma
- Stats at NBA.com
- Stats at Basketball Reference
Medals
Men's basketball
Representing the United States
Olympic Games
Gold medal – first place	1976 Montreal	Team competition

Steven Bernard Sheppard (born March 21, 1954) is an American former professional basketball player from New York City, who was nicknamed "Bear".

A 6'6" small forward from the University of Maryland, Sheppard participated on the United States national basketball team which won a gold medal at the 1976 Summer Olympics. Sheppard was then selected by the Chicago Bulls as the eighth pick in the second round of the 1977 NBA draft. In two NBA seasons (1977–1979) with the Bulls and Detroit Pistons, Sheppard scored 367 points and grabbed 178 rebounds.

== Career statistics ==
Legend
GP	Games played	GS	Games started	MPG	Minutes per game
FG%	Field goal percentage	3P%	3-point field goal percentage	FT%	Free throw percentage
RPG	Rebounds per game	APG	Assists per game	SPG	Steals per game
BPG	Blocks per game	PPG	Points per game	**Bold**	Career high

=== NBA ===
==== Regular season ====
Year	Team	GP	MPG	FG%	FT%	RPG	APG	SPG	BPG	PPG
1977–78	Chicago	**64**	**10.9**	.454	**.661**	**2.0**	**.7**	**.2**	.0	**4.3**
1978–79	Chicago	22	9.2	.471	.632	1.3	**.7**	**.2**	.0	2.7
1978–79	Detroit	20	3.8	**.480**	.533	1.0	.2	**.2**	**.1**	1.6
Career		106	9.2	.459	.633	1.7	.6	.2	.0	3.5
