= Eva Maria Pracht =

Canadian equestrian (1937–2021)

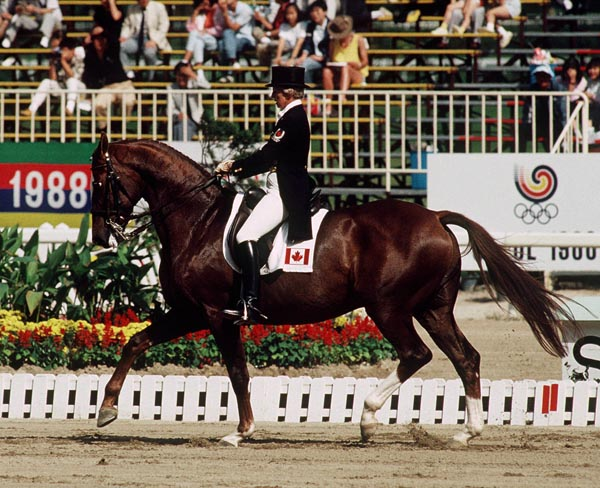
- Pracht at the 1988 Summer Olympics in Seoul

Personal information
- Born: 29 June 1937 Würzburg, Bavaria, Germany
- Died: 15 February 2021 (aged 83) Toronto, Ontario, Canada
Medal record
Equestrian
Representing Canada
Olympic Games
| Bronze medal – third place | 1988 Seoul | Team dressage |
Pan American Games
| Gold medal – first place | 1987 Indianapolis | Team dressage |

Eva Maria "Evi" Pracht (née Neckermann; 29 June 1937 – 15 February 2021) was a Canadian equestrian who competed in dressage in the 1984 Summer Olympics and was part of the bronze-medallist team at the 1988 Summer Olympics.

== Early life ==
Born in Würzburg, she was the only daughter of equestrian Josef Neckermann. She had two brothers, Peter and Johannes.

Having initially competed in show jumping, she eventually switched disciplines and learned dressage from her father. By the late 1960s, she was campaigning her father's 1964 Olympic ride Antoinette. The pair placed 3rd at the CHIO Aachen in 1969 and earned a silver medal at the German Championships that same year.

=== Dressage ===
The fundamental purpose of dressage is to develop, through standardized progressive training methods, a horse's natural athletic ability and willingness to perform, thereby maximizing its potential as a riding horse. Dressage is used to teach horses to be athletes. They learn to carry the weight of the riders, and to carry themselves as well in a more graceful, and balanced manner. Dressage means "training", and it teaches a horse to be safer to ride, more responsive to the rider, and more obedient.

Dressage consists of a series of 39 exercises demonstrating how well the rider communicates with the horse. Included exercises are the walk, trot, and canter, as well as having the horse walk backwards, and weave through a pre-determined serpentine course. Four judges score the maneuvers on a ten-point scale.

== Training ==
Aside from Antoinette, Little Joe and Emirage, Pracht's celebrated competition horses included Mazepa, Duccas, Cantate and Lyogen. In her lifetime she built up her expertise by having been coached by her father, as well as by Willi Schultheis, Walter Christensen, the well-known Heinz Lammers, Walther Günther and Harry Boldt.

Heinz Lammers taught in the riding schools in Saerbeck and Greven, Germany, before going independent in 1967. He had a training stable in Olfen and was a heavily sought after coach. In addition to Eva, his students included Olympians Edith Master, an American winner of the Olympic Bronze Medal in team dressage in Montreal in 1976, and Pia Laus. Lammers was considered one of the defining personalities in Westphalian (Westphalia region, Germany) equestrian sport, which he helped shape and supervise as state trainer for dressage for almost a quarter of a century. Receiving around 100 medals as a trainer, the Equestrian Association of Westphalia honored Lammers' work with the Golden Plaque of Merit in 2002. He died on February 8, 1922.

== Riding with the Canadian team ==
She married entrepreneur Hans Pracht, and in 1981 the couple and two children moved to Cedar Valley, Ontario, Canada. Pracht rode her first Olympics in Los Angeles in 1984 aboard Little Joe, a horse which she later passed on to her daughter Martina. Four years later, at the 1988 Summer Olympics, she climbed the Olympic podium as part of the bronze medal winning Canadian Equestrian Team for dressage, aboard Swedish Warmblood gelding Emirage.

She represented Canada at the following events:

- 1982 World Championships: Equestrian – Dressage Individual
- 1984 Summer Olympics: Los Angeles, Equestrian – Dressage Team and Individual – with equine partner Little Joe
- 1986 World Championships: Equestrian – Dressage Individual
- 1987 Pan American Games: Equestrian – Dressage Team, Gold Medal – with equine partner Emirage
- 1988 Summer Olympics: Seoul, Equestrian – Dressage Team, Bronze Medal – with equine partner Emirage
- 1991 World Cup: Equestrian – Dressage Individual

Pracht helped coach numerous quadrilles through the years and organised the choreography. She helped, mentored and was eyes on the ground for Canadian dressage riders such as Gina Smith, Evi Strasser, Ashley Holzer, and many more.

She died from COVID-19 on 15 February 2021 in Toronto, during the COVID-19 pandemic in Toronto. She was 83.

== Family ==
Pracht's daughter, Martina, was born in Frankfurt, Hesse, West Germany, in 1964 and also became an accomplished equestrian in Canada. She has won seven medals, five gold and two silver, from the North American Young Rider Championships.

In 1984, Pracht's 23-year old son Josef Johannes "Jo Jo" Pracht died by suicide when he jumped off a bridge on the A45 motorway near Dillenburg. In 1978 Jo Jo had lost his leg in a moped accident after slipping on a rainy road.
