= Cynthia Neale-Ishoy =

Canadian equestrian

Personal information
- Born: 19 June 1952 (age 74) Edmonton, Alberta
Medal record
Equestrian
Representing Canada
Olympic Games
Bronze medal – third place	1988 Seoul	Team dressage
World Cup
Silver medal – second place	1988 Den Bosch	Individual dressage
Pan American Games
Gold medal – first place	1971 Cali	Team dressage

Cynthia Margaret "Cindy" Neale-Ishoy (born 19 June 1952) is a Canadian equestrian. She was born in Edmonton.

She was a member of the Canadian Equestrian Team in dressage at the 1988 Summer Olympics in Seoul. She placed fourth in individual dressage, and won a bronze medal in team dressage with teammates Eva Pracht, Ashley Nicoll-Holzer and Gina Smith. A six time Olympian, she also competed at the 1972, 1992 and 2004 Summer Olympics, as well as qualifying for the boycotted 1980 Olympics and the 2008 Athens Olympics.
