= Buddy Brown (equestrian) =

American equestrian

Personal information
- Full name: William Vincent Brown
- Born: April 13, 1956 (age 70) New York City, New York, U.S.

Sport
- Country: United States
- Sport: Equestrian
Medal record
Equestrian
Representing the United States
Pan American Games
Gold medal – first place	1975 Mexico City	Team jumping
Gold medal – first place	1979 San Juan	Team jumping
Silver medal – second place	1975 Mexico City	Individual jumping

William Vincent Brown (born April 13, 1956), known as Buddy Brown, is an American equestrian. He competed in two events at the 1976 Summer Olympics.
