= Gina Smith (equestrian) =

Canadian equestrian

Personal information
- Born: November 11, 1957 (age 67); Saskatoon, Saskatchewan, Canada
Medal record
Equestrian
Representing Canada
Olympic Games
Bronze medal – third place	1988 Seoul	Team dressage
Pan American Games
Gold medal – first place	1991 Havana	Team dressage

Gina Smith (born November 11, 1957) is a Canadian equestrian. She won a team bronze medal as part of the Canadian Equestrian Team in dressage at the 1988 Summer Olympics in Seoul, together with teammates Cynthia Neale-Ishoy, Eva Pracht and Ashley Nicoll-Holzer. She also competed at the 1996 Summer Olympics.
