= Jo Rutten =

Dutch equestrian

Personal information
- Nationality: Dutch
- Born: 20 May 1934 Grathem, Netherlands
- Died: 21 March 2007 (aged 72) Hunsel, Netherlands

Sport
- Sport: Equestrian

Jozefus Alphons Marie "Jo" Rutten (20 May 1934 – 21 March 2007) was a Dutch equestrian. He competed at the 1976 Summer Olympics and the 1984 Summer Olympics.
