= Philippe Limousin =

French equestrian

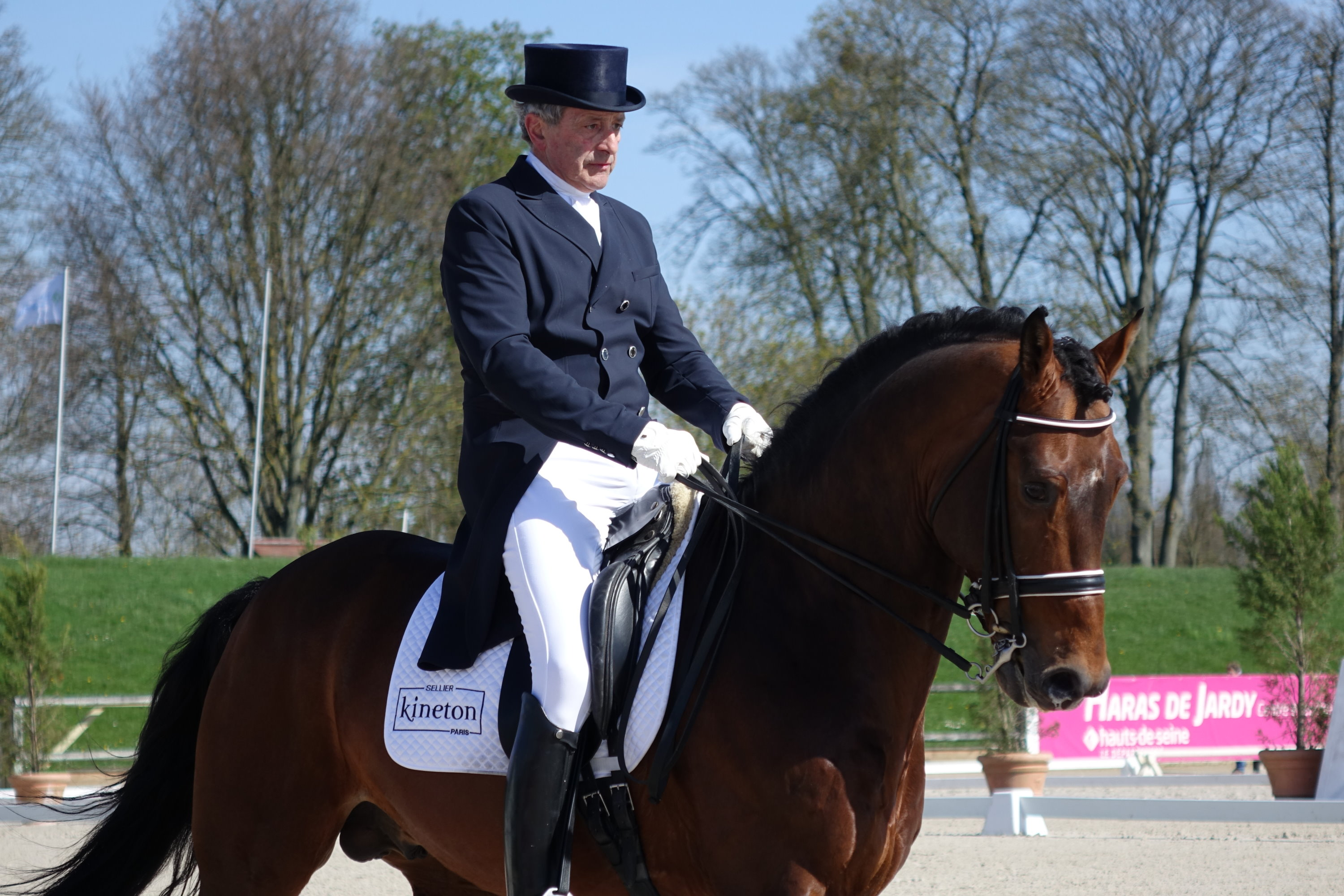
- Philippe Limousin in 2016

Personal information
- Nationality: French
- Born: 27 May 1948 (age 76)

Sport
- Sport: Equestrian

Philippe Limousin (born 27 May 1948) is a French equestrian. He competed in two events at the 1988 Summer Olympics.
