= Edith Master =

Jewish-American equestrian

Edith Louise Master

Personal information
- Citizenship: U.S.
- Born: August 25, 1932 New York, New York
- Died: August 18, 2013 (aged 80) New York, New York
- Education: Cornell, NYU
- Height: 165 cm (5 ft 5 in)
- Weight: 62 kg (137 lb)
Medal record
Equestrian
Olympic Games
Representing United States
Bronze medal – third place	1976 Montreal	Dressage, Team

Edith Louise Master (August 25, 1932 – August 18, 2013) was a Jewish-American equestrian who specialized in dressage.

== Early life ==
She was born in New York, New York, on August 25, 1932, daughter of Dr. Arthur M. Master and Hilda Altschul Master. She studied at Cornell and New York University.

== Equestrian career ==
Master competed for the United States in both individual and team dressage, finishing 23rd aboard her mount Heloise in individual in 1968 in the Mexico City Olympics and 19th aboard Dahlwitz in individual in the 1972 Munich Olympics, which placed her well out of medal contention.

At the 1976 Olympics, her third, she won a bronze medal in team dressage, aboard her horse Dahlwitz. Dahlwitz is a city, and common surname in Germany. Moving up from previous Olympic competition with the aid of experience and coaching, she placed 14th in individual dressage in the 1976 Montreal Olympics. With her 1976 Olympic bronze in team dressage at the age of 43, she became the second-oldest US female to win an Olympic medal in any sport. The 1976 American Team at Montreal was coached by Colonel Bengt Ljungquist of Sweden, former Cavalry officer, Dressage competitor and Olympic fencing athlete, who helped American dressage break a 28-year Olympic medal drought that year.

The favorites for the team dressage competition in Montreal in 1976 were Germany, Switzerland, and the Soviet Union to medal, but the US managed to clinch the bronze ahead of the USSR for their first dressage medal since the 1948 Games. Edith may have benefited considerably in competing against the dominant German dressage team by receiving training from Heinz Lammers, one of the greatest German dressage coaches of the era and by the skills of her Olympic dressage coach, Colonel Bengt Ljunquist.

=== Dressage ===
The fundamental purpose of dressage is to develop, through standardized progressive training methods, a horse's natural athletic ability and willingness to perform, thereby maximizing its potential as a riding horse. The United States had very little history of Olympic equestrian medals prior to 1976. Dressage, which can be performed in the Olympics as an individual event or as part of a team, is used to teach horses to be athletes. They learn to carry the weight of the riders, and to carry themselves as well in a more graceful, and balanced manner. Dressage means "training", and it teaches a horse to be safer to ride, more responsive to the rider, and more obedient.

==== Dressage exercises ====
Dressage consists of a series of 39 exercises demonstrating how well the rider communicates with the horse. Included exercises are the walk, trot, and canter, as well as having the horse walk backwards, and weave through a pre-determined serpentine course. Four judges score the maneuvers on a ten-point scale. Edith and her two teammates at Montreal, Hilda Gurney and Dorothy Morkis received a combined score of 4,647 points.

== Training ==
While living in Germany for a number of years, she studied dressage under the exceptional trainer Heinz Lammers. Lammers taught in the riding schools in Saerbeck and Greven, Germany, before going independent in 1967. He had a training stable in Olfen and was a heavily sought after coach. In addition to Edith Master, his students included Olympians Eva Maria Pracht, and Pia Laus. Lammers was considered one of the defining personalities in Westphalian (Westphalia region, Germany) equestrian sport, which he helped shape and supervise as state trainer for dressage for almost a quarter of a century. Receiving around 100 medals as a trainer, the Equestrian Association of Westphalia honored Lammers' work with the Golden Plaque of Merit in 2002. He died on February 8, 1922.

Successful Dressage riders must master the art of getting their horse to move at a relaxed pace, at an even rhythm, on the right track, and yet remain alert with a vertical profile to the ground and a properly bent head. Edith collected exotic birds, raised German shepherds, and grew orchids as hobbies.

Edith died on August 18, 2013, at the age of 80. Funeral arrangements were made by Zion Memorial Chapel in Rye, New York.

== See also ==
- List of select Jewish equestrians
