= Maarit Raiskio =

Finnish equestrian

Personal information
- Nationality: Finnish
- Born: 5 February 1964 (age 61); Pori, Finland

Sport
- Sport: Equestrian

Maarit Raiskio (born 5 February 1964) is a Finnish equestrian. She competed in two events at the 1988 Summer Olympics.
