= Tutu Sohlberg =

Finnish equestrian (1941–2026)

Personal information
- Full name: Suvi Tuulikki Tutu Sohlberg
- Nationality: Finnish
- Born: 8 August 1941 Helsinki, Finland
- Died: 3 June 2026 (aged 84)

Sport
- Sport: Equestrian

Suvi Tuulikki Tutu Sohlberg (8 August 1941 – 3 June 2026) was a Finnish equestrian. She competed in two events at the 1988 Summer Olympics. Sohlberg died on 3 June 2026, at the age of 84.
