= Hilda Gurney =

American equestrian (born 1943)

Personal information
- Full name: Hilda Carolyn Gurney
- Born: September 10, 1943 (age 82) Los Angeles, California, U.S.
- Education: Cal State Northridge
- Height: 168 cm (5 ft 6 in)
- Weight: 63 kg (139 lb)
Medal record
Equestrian
Representing the United States
Olympic Games
Bronze medal – third place	1976 Montreal	Team dressage
Pan American Games
Gold medal – first place	1975 Mexico City	Team dressage
Gold medal – first place	1979 San Juan	Individual dressage
Gold medal – first place	1983 Caracas	Team dressage
Silver medal – second place	1983 Caracas	Individual dressage

Hilda Carolyn Gurney (born September 10, 1943) is an American equestrian. She was born in Los Angeles. She won a bronze medal in team dressage at the 1976 Summer Olympics in Montreal, aboard her chestnut gelding Keen, who she purchased, named, and trained herself. She participated at the 1984 Summer Olympics in Los Angeles, again aboard Keen, where the US dressage team placed sixth. After her competitive career, she trains and breeds dressage horses and acts as a competition judge.

== Equestrian career highlights ==
=== Bronze olympic medal ===
As noted, Gurney, at the pinnacle of her career, won a bronze medal in team dressage at the 1976 Summer Olympics in Montreal. According to one source, she placed first in the Olympic Trials around June 20, winning both the Grand Prix and Grand Prix Special, with New Yorker Edith Master placing second. The 1976 American Team was coached by Colonel Bengt Ljungquist of Sweden, former Cavalry officer, Dressage competitor and Olympic fencing athlete, who helped American dressage break a 28-year Olympic medal drought that year.

=== Pan-American games medals ===
Prior to winning her Olympic medal in 1976, Gurney had finished second in the individual dressage and won a gold medal in the team event at the 1975 Pan-American Games. Gurney improved at the 1979 Pan Ams, winning gold in individual dressage, and leading the US team to first place, although team medals were not awarded that year because of insufficient entries. Her medal record at right still shows her gold medal for individual dressage at the 1979 Pan Ams. She competed again at the 1983 Pan American Games, winning a silver in individual and a gold in team dressage.

=== US National Grand Prix ===
During her equestrian career in the United States, she won six US National Grand Prix Championships. In 1977 she was Martini & Rossi AHSA Horsewoman of the Year. She won the 1979 Grand Prix and Grand Prix Special aboard Keen at Knoll Farm in Brentwood, New York.

=== "Keen" ===
After her 1979 Grand Prix win, she noted that Keen had been a racehorse at one time when she bought him for $1000 around 1969 as a three-year-old thoroughbred. Unsuccessful as a racehorse, he made an exceptional dressage mount after she trained him herself. After Keen injured a ligament during a jump around 1971, she began to ride him strictly in dressage competition. Keen, whom Hilda was planning to use as a dressage mount in the 1984 Olympics, was a chestnut gelding, 17.2 hands high (5 feet 10 inches, 1.778 meters), and a large, beautiful, dark gelding who was 18 in 1984. Hilda noted that training a horse for dressage was very difficult but very rewarding, despite the complexity and challenge of communicating with an animal. She wanted spectators to know that dressage was physically demanding for both her and Keen, but needed to appear as an effortless, and aesthetically pleasing harmony between horse and rider. After the 1979 Pan Am games, "Keen" injured ligaments in both front legs, and developed a spinal injury, but miraculously began recovering around 1982, and by 1984 was fit enough to compete again. After having Keen work with a trainer, Hilda won a Grand Prix in Hamilton, Massachusetts aboard Keen in June, 1984, and was selected to ride for the 1984 Los Angeles Olympics where the American dressage team placed sixth.

After winning two dressage medals aboard the 13-year old Stallion Chrysos in the 1983 Pan-American Games, she told the LA Times that in the 1970's Keen was considered one of the greatest dressage mounts in the world. As her career would later focus on her skills as a trainer, she told a LA Times reporter in July 1984, shortly before her next Olympic Dressage competition that August in Los Angeles, that "it takes six to eight years to train to the level of the Olympics. Thats after you've spent ten years learning how to do it".

Hilda graduated from Cal State Northridge in 1966. After graduation, she worked fourteen years as a teacher of educationally handicapped children, while continuing to compete as an Equestrian.

=== Teaching and judging dressage ===
After college, and teaching school, she began teaching riding, and training and breeding dressage horses. Gurney later worked as a dressage judge at both the national and international level. She served as chair of the US Dressage Foundation Sport Horse Committee from 1997-2002. She has been a long-time member of the US Equestrian Federation Dressage Committee.

=== Honors ===
Gurney was inducted into the U.S. Dressage Federation Hall of Fame in 2007. A respected judge and clinician, she breeds horses, trains and teaches in Moorpark, California, outside Los Angeles.
