= Eva Lindsten =

Swedish equestrian

Personal information
- Nationality: Swedish
- Born: 31 May 1945 (age 79); Gothenburg, Sweden

Sport
- Sport: Equestrian

Eva Lindsten (born 31 May 1945) is a Swedish equestrian. She competed in two events at the 1988 Summer Olympics.
