= Barbara Stracey =

Canadian equestrian

Personal information
- Born: 6 November 1953 (age 72) Montreal, Quebec, Canada

Sport
- Sport: Equestrian
Medal record
Equestrian
Representing Canada
Pan American Games
Silver medal – second place	1975 Mexico City	Team dressage

Barbara Stracey-Minshall (born 6 November 1953) is a Canadian equestrian. She competed in the individual dressage event at the 1976 Summer Olympics.
