= Jenny Eriksson =

Finnish equestrian

Personal information
- Nationality: Finnish
- Born: 23 July 1959 (age 65); Helsinki, Finland

Sport
- Sport: Equestrian

Jenny Eriksson (born 23 July 1959) is a Finnish equestrian. She competed in two events at the 1988 Summer Olympics.
