= Lars Andersson (equestrian) =

Swedish equestrian

Personal information
- Nationality: Swedish
- Born: 7 August 1956 (age 68); Malmö, Sweden

Sport
- Sport: Equestrian

Lars Andersson (born 7 August 1956) is a Swedish equestrian. He competed in two events at the 1988 Summer Olympics.

He is currently active as international dressage judge. He was promoted to 5* level in 2020, which allows him to judge at European and World Championships and at the Olympic Games.
