= Jennie Loriston-Clarke =

British equestrian

Jennie Loriston-Clarke MBE
Personal information
- Nationality: British
- Born: 22 January 1943 (age 83) Charmouth, England

Sport
- Sport: Equestrian
Medal record
Equestrian
Representing Great Britain
World Championships
| Bronze medal – third place | 1978 Goodwood | Individual dressage |

Jennie Loriston-Clarke MBE (born 22 January 1943) is a British equestrian. She competed at the 1972, 1976, 1984 and 1988 Summer Olympics. After her riding career, Loriston-Clarke was active as an international Eventing and Dressage judge on 4* level and as Technical Delegate.

== Biography ==
Loriston-Clarke was born in Charmouth, England, in 1943.

From 1972 to 1988, she competed at four Olympic Games, only missing the 1980 Summer Olympics in Moscow. Her best individual performance was 14th place in the dressage at the 1988 Summer Olympics in Seoul, South Korea. She retired from competition in 1995.

In 1979, Loriston-Clarke was awarded with an MBE for her services to equestrianism, and in 2006 she became the first person to be awarded with the Queen's Award for Equestrianism.

Loriston-Clarke's sister, Jane and brother Michael have also represented Great Britain at the Olympics in equestrian events.
