= Dressage World Cup =

International dressage series

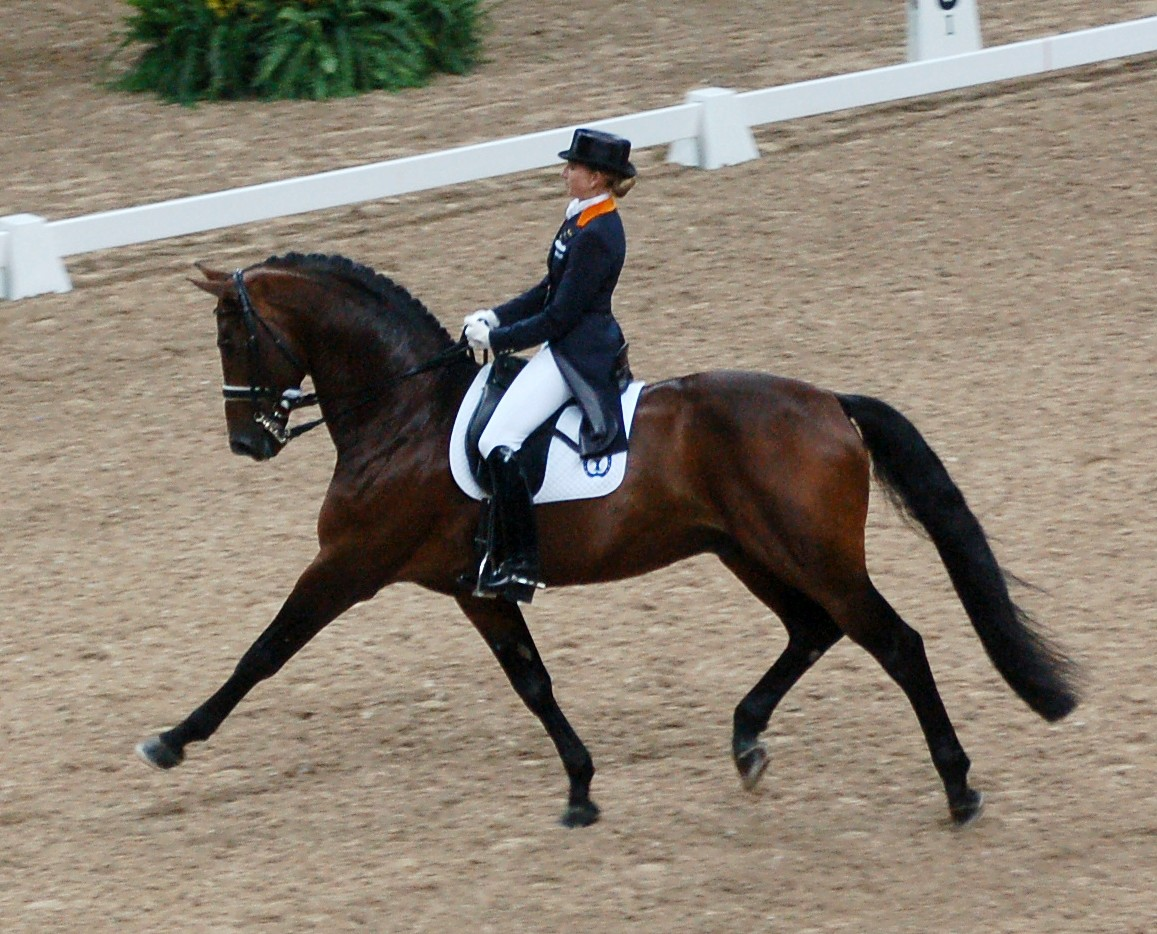
Marlies van Baalen on Kigali at the 2007 FEI World Cup Dressage Final in Las Vegas

The FEI World Cup Dressage Final is an annual international dressage series involving the world's best dressage horses and riders. It has been held since 1985. The World Cup is run in the form of a CDI.

== History ==
The history of the World Cup Dressage Final is closely connected to the history of the Grand Prix Freestyle. In 1984 Joep Bartels (former rider, husband of Tineke Bartels and father of Imke Schellekens-Bartels) saw Reiner Klimke and Ahlerich perform the one tempi changes to John Williams' Olympic Fanfare at the 1984 Summer Olympics. Inspired by this, he thought of a freestyle dressage competition.

One year later, the first World Cup Dressage Final was held. Each qualifier for the World Cup Final, which is held at the end of each season, consists of two competitions (Grand Prix de Dressage and Grand Prix Freestyle). From 1985 to 2001 both competitions counted for the qualifier results, which were part of the world cup ranking for this season. Since 2002, only the Grand Prix Freestyle has counted for the world cup ranking.

From 1985 to 2004 Joep Bartels was the director of the World Cup Dressage Final.

Reem Acra was the World Cup Dressage Final title sponsor from the season 2010/2011 to 2015.

== Qualification to the World Cup final ==
Riders, who will be part of the World Cup Dressage Final, have two options to qualify for this event.

The first option is, to qualify oneself by one World Cup league. There are four Dressage World Cup leagues:

League	Geographical location	Number of quotas for the World Cup final	Number of participants who have the chance to move up in the final
Western European League (WEL)	European nations west of the line: Andorra, Austria, Belgium, Denmark, Finland, France, Germany, Ireland, Iceland, Italy, Liechtenstein, Luxembourg, Malta, Monaco, Netherlands, Norway, Portugal, San Marino, Spain, Sweden, Switzerland, United Kingdom	9	up to the 14th rank
Central European League(CEL)	European nations east of the line such as Belarus, Bulgaria, Estonia, Hungary, Latvia, Lithuania, Moldova, Poland, Russia, Slovakia, Slovenia, Czech Republic, Ukraine (list may be incomplete)	2	up to the 3rd rank
North American League (NAL)	United States of America, Canada, Mexico	2	up to the 3rd rank
Asia / Pacific League (PAL)	Australia, New Zealand	1	up to the 2nd rank

Generally, only three participants per nation are allowed to participate in the World Cup final.

In addition, the FEI awards two extra starting places to riders that have not qualified for the World Cup finals. Unused starting places can also be allocated by the FEI as extra starting places.

To participate with a horse in the World Cup final, a rider (which starts in one of the leagues) has to start with this horse in two World Cup qualifiers. In this competition, the rider has to complete the competition with at least 68.000%.

The title holder is automatically qualified for the World Cup final, but he/she must also qualify his horse in the above called way. If he/she starts in a qualifier, he/she is not considered in the scoring (scoring points) of this event.

=== Allocation of scoring points ===
The scoring of the league is set only for the European leagues by the FEI. The North American and the Pacific Leagues have their own regulations.

==== European leagues ====
In the European leagues the number of scoring points of each rider decide on the qualification of the rider for the World Cup final. The points are awarded in the Grand Prix Freestyle according to the following system:

- 1st rank: 20 points
- 2nd rank: 17 points
- 3rd rank: 15 points
- 4th rank: 13 points
- 5th rank: 12 points
- 6th rank: 11 points
- 7th rank: 10 points
- 8th rank: 9 points
- 9th rank: 8 points
- 10th rank: 7 points
- 11th rank: 6 points
- 12th rank: 5 points
- 13th rank: 4 points
- 14th rank: 3 points
- 15th rank: 2 points

If the 15th rank awarded several times, all riders of this rank will get 2 scoring points.

==== North American League ====
In the North American League each rider has to start in two qualifiers to have the chance to start in the World Cup final. The best two Grand Prix Freestyle results of each rider by World Cup qualifiers are added and then divided by two. The two riders with the best scoring of this procedure are qualified for the World Cup final.

==== Pacific League ====
The Pacific League has no scoring ranking. Riders, who have to complete a Grand Prix Freestyle competition at a CDI 3* or CDI-W in the Pacific League region with at least 62.000%, have the chance to start at the Pacific League final. This league final is held between December and February in Australia or New Zealand. The winner of this league final are qualified for the World Cup final.

== World Cup final ==
The World Cup final is held at the end of each Dressage World Cup season in March or April. The first competition of the final is the Grand Prix de Dressage, the winner of the second competition of the final (the Grand Prix Freestyle) is the winner of this World Cup season.

=== World Cup winners ===
Season	Location	Gold	Silver	Bronze
1985/1986	(Netherlands) 's-Hertogenbosch	(Denmark) Anne Grethe Jensen on Marzog	(United Kingdom) Christopher Bartle on Wily Trout	(Switzerland) Christine Stückelberger on Rubelit von Unkenruf
1986/1987	(Germany) Essen	(Switzerland) Christine Stückelberger on Gaugin de Lully	(Denmark) Anne Grethe Jensen on Marzog	(West Germany) George Theodorescu on Sunny Boy
1987/1988	(Netherlands) 's-Hertogenbosch	(Switzerland) Christine Stückelberger on Gaugin de Lully	(Canada) Cindy Neale-Ishoy on Dynasty	(Switzerland) Otto Hofer on Andiamo
1988/1989	(Sweden) Gothenburg	(France) Margit Otto-Crepin on Corlandus	(Switzerland) Christine Stückelberger on Gaugin de Lully	(Soviet Union) Nina Menkova on Dikson
1989/1990	(Netherlands) 's-Hertogenbosch	(Germany) Sven Rothenberger on Andiamo	(Germany) Michael Klimke on Entertainer	(Soviet Union) Nina Menkova on Dikson
1990/1991	(France) Paris	(Finland) Kyra Kyrklund on Matador	(Soviet Union) Nina Menkova on Dikson	(Germany) Sven Rothenberger on Andiamo
1991/1992	(Sweden) Gothenburg	(Germany) Isabell Werth on Fabienne	(Germany) Sven Rothenberger on Ideaal	(Germany) Monica Theodorescu on Grunox
1992/1993	(Netherlands) 's-Hertogenbosch	(Germany) Monica Theodorescu on Ganimedes	(Germany) Sven Rothenberger on Ideaal	(Germany) Isabell Werth on Fabienne
1993/1994	(Sweden) Gothenburg	(Germany) Monica Theodorescu on Ganimedes	(Germany) Nicole Uphoff on Grand Gilbert	(Finland) Kyra Kyrklund on Edinburg
1994/1995	(United States) Los Angeles	(Netherlands) Anky van Grunsven on Bonfire	(Germany) Monica Theodorescu on Ganimedes	(Netherlands) Sven Rothenberger on Bo
1995/1996	(Sweden) Gothenburg	(Netherlands) Anky van Grunsven on Bonfire	(France) Margit Otto-Crepin on Lucky Lord	(Germany) Klaus Balkenhol on Garcon
1996/1997	(Netherlands) 's-Hertogenbosch	(Netherlands) Anky van Grunsven on Bonfire	(Netherlands) Sven Rothenberger on Jonggor's Weyden	(Sweden) Louise Nathhorst on Walk on Top
1997/1998	(Sweden) Gothenburg	(Sweden) Louise Nathhorst on Walk on Top	(Netherlands) Anky van Grunsven on Bonfire	(Germany) Isabell Werth on Anthony FRH
1998/1999	(Germany) Dortmund	(Netherlands) Anky van Grunsven on Bonfire	(Germany) Isabell Werth on Anthony FRH	(Germany) Alexandra Simons de Ridder on Chacomo
1999/2000	(Netherlands) 's-Hertogenbosch	(Netherlands) Anky van Grunsven on Bonfire	(Netherlands) Coby van Baalen on Olympic Ferro	(Netherlands) Arjen Teeuwissen on Goliath
2000/2001	(Denmark) Aarhus	(Germany) Ulla Salzgeber on Rusty	(Germany) Isabell Werth on Anthony FRH	(Germany) Rudolf Zeilinger on Livijno
2001/2002	(Netherlands) 's-Hertogenbosch	(Germany) Ulla Salzgeber on Rusty – 81.570%	(Denmark) Lars Petersen on Cavan – 79.670%	(Spain) Beatriz Ferrer-Salat on Beauvalais – 79.120%
2002/2003	(Sweden) Gothenburg	(United States) Debbie McDonald on Brentina – 78.890%	(Germany) Heike Kemmer on Albano – 76.940%	(United States) Guenter Seidel on Nikolaus – 75.720%
2003/2004	(Germany) Düsseldorf	(Netherlands) Anky van Grunsven on Salinero – 83.450 %	(Netherlands) Edward Gal on Lingh – 80.625%	(Germany) Hubertus Schmidt on Wansuela Suerte – 78.875%
2004/2005	(United States) Las Vegas	(Netherlands) Anky van Grunsven on Salinero – 86.725%	(Netherlands) Edward Gal on Lingh – 85.225%	(United States) Debbie McDonald on Brentina – 83.450%
2005/2006	(Netherlands) Amsterdam	(Netherlands) Anky van Grunsven on Salinero – 87.750%	(Germany) Isabell Werth on Warum Nicht FRH – 81.150%	(Sweden) Jan Brink on Briar – 79.320%
2006/2007	(United States) Las Vegas	(Germany) Isabell Werth on Warum nicht FRH – 84.250%	(Netherlands) Imke Schellekens-Bartels on Sunrise – 77.950 %	(United States) Steffen Peters on Floriano – 77.800%
2007/2008	(Netherlands) 's-Hertogenbosch	(Netherlands) Anky van Grunsven on Salinero – 85.200%	(Germany) Isabell Werth on Warum nicht FRH – 82.600%	(Finland) Kyra Kyrklund on Max – 78.150%
2008/2009	(United States) Las Vegas	(United States) Steffen Peters on Ravel – 84.950%	(Germany) Isabell Werth on Satchmo – 84.500%	(Netherlands) Anky van Grunsven on Painted Black – 82.150%
2009/2010	(Netherlands) 's-Hertogenbosch	(Netherlands) Edward Gal om Totilas – 89.800%	(Netherlands) Adelinde Cornelissen on Parzival – 82.850%	(Netherlands) Imke Schellekens-Bartels on Sunrise – 82.150%
2010/2011	(Germany) Leipzig (2011 FEI World Cup Finals)	(Netherlands) Adelinde Cornelissen on Parzival – 84,804%	(Denmark) Nathalie zu Sayn-Wittgenstein on Digby – 80,036%	(Germany) Ulla Salzgeber on Herzruf´s Erbe – 78,821%
2011/2012	(Netherlands) 's-Hertogenbosch (2012 FEI World Cup Finals)	(Netherlands) Adelinde Cornelissen on Parzival – 86,250%	(Germany) Helen Langehanenberg on Damon Hill NRW - 85,143%	(Italy) Valentina Truppa on Eremo del Castegno - 81,232%
2012/2013	(Sweden) Gothenburg (2013 FEI World Cup Finals)	(Germany) Helen Langehanenberg on Damon Hill NRW – 88,286%	(Netherlands) Adelinde Cornelissen on Jerich Parzival - 86,214%	(Netherlands) Edward Gal on Glock's Undercover - 84,446%
2013/2014	(France) Lyon (2014 FEI World Cup Finals)	(United Kingdom) Charlotte Dujardin on Valegro – 92.179%	(Germany) Helen Langehanenberg on Damon Hill NRW - 87.339%	(Netherlands) Edward Gal on Glock's Undercover - 83.696%
2014/2015	(United States) Las Vegas (2015 FEI World Cup Finals)	(United Kingdom) Charlotte Dujardin on Valegro – 94.196%	(Netherlands) Edward Gal on Glock's Undercover - 84.696%	(Germany) Jessica von Bredow-Werndl on Unee BB - 80.464%
2015/2016	(Sweden) Gothenburg (2016 FEI World Cup Finals)	(Netherlands) Hans Peter Minderhoud on Glock's Flirt - 82.357%	(Sweden) Tinne Vilhelmson-Silfvén on Don Auriello - 81.429%	(Germany) Jessica von Bredow-Werndl on Unee BB - 80.464%
2016/2017	(United States) Omaha (2017 FEI World Cup Finals)	(Germany) Isabell Werth on Weihegold OLD - 90.704%	(United States) Laura Graves on Verdades - 85.307%	(United Kingdom) Carl Hester on Nip Tuck - 83.757%
2017/2018	(France) Paris (2018 FEI World Cup Finals)	(Germany) Isabell Werth on Weihegold OLD - 90.657%	(United States) Laura Graves on Verdades - 89.082%	(Germany) Jessica von Bredow-Werndl on Unee BB - 83.725%
2018/2019	(Sweden) Gothenburg (2019 FEI World Cup Finals)	(Germany) Isabell Werth on Weihegold OLD - 88.871%	(United States) Laura Graves on Verdades - 87.179%	(Germany) Helen Langehanenberg on Damsey FRH - 86.571%
2019/2020	(United States) Las Vegas (2020 FEI World Cup Finals)	Cancelled due to the COVID-19 pandemic
2020/2021	(Sweden) Gothenburg (2021 FEI World Cup Finals)	Cancelled due to the EHV-1 outbreak
2021/2022	(Germany) Leipzig (2022 FEI World Cup Finals)	(Germany) Jessica von Bredow-Werndl on TSF Dalera BB - 90.836%	(Denmark) Cathrine Dufour on Vamos Amigos - 86.164%	(Germany) Isabell Werth on Weihegold OLD - 85.921%
2022/2023	(United States) Omaha (2023 FEI World Cup Finals)	(Germany) Jessica von Bredow-Werndl on TSF Dalera BB - 90.482%	(Denmark) Nanna Skodborg Merrald on Blue Hors Zepter - 87.146%	(Germany) Isabell Werth on DSP Quantaz - 85.671%
2023/2024	(Saudi Arabia) Riyadh (2024 FEI World Cup Finals)	(Sweden) Patrik Kittel on Touchdown - 81.661%	(Denmark) Nanna Skodborg Merrald on Blue Hors Don Olymbrio - 81.429%	(Germany) Isabell Werth on DSP Quantaz - 81.404%
2024/2025	(Switzerland) Basel (2025 FEI World Cup Finals)	(United Kingdom) Charlotte Fry on Glamourdale - 88.195%	(Germany) Isabell Werth on DSP Quantaz - 84.365%	(Norway) Isabel Freese on Total Hope OLD - 81.850%
2025/2026	(United States) Fort Worth (2026 FEI World Cup Finals)	(United Kingdom) Becky Moody on Jägerbomb - 88.330%	(United States) Christian Simonson on Indian Rock - 83.810%	(Poland) Sandra Sysojeva on Maxima Bella - 80.770%
2026/2027	(Sweden) Gothenburg (2027 FEI World Cup Finals)
2027/2028	(Switzerland) Basel (2028 FEI World Cup Finals)
