= Christine Stückelberger =

Swiss equestrian (born 1947)

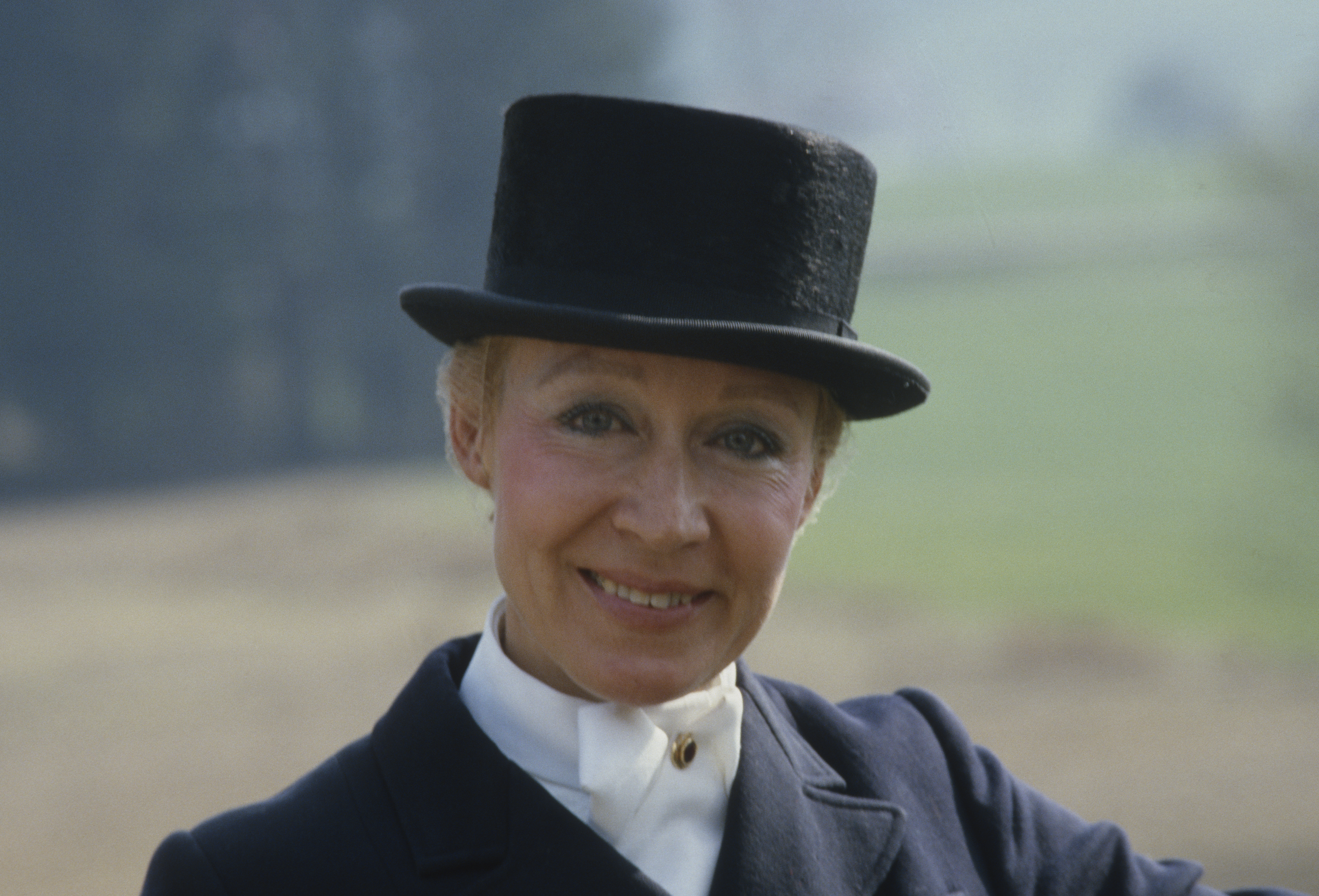
- Christine Stückelberger

Personal information
- Born: 22 May 1947 (age 79) Bern, Switzerland
- Height: 1.62 m (5 ft 4 in)
- Weight: 48 kg (106 lb)

Sport
- Sport: Equestrianism
- Club: Reitverein Bern
- Coached by: Georg Wahl
Medal record
Representing Switzerland
Olympic Games
| Gold medal – first place | 1976 Montreal | Individual dressage |
| Silver medal – second place | 1976 Montreal | Team dressage |
| Silver medal – second place | 1984 Los Angeles | Team dressage |
| Silver medal – second place | 1988 Seoul | Team dressage |
| Bronze medal – third place | 1988 Seoul | Individual dressage |
World Championships
| Gold medal – first place | 1978 Goodwood | Individual dressage |
| Silver medal – second place | 1978 Goodwood | Team dressage |
| Silver medal – second place | 1982 Lausanne | Individual dressage |
| Silver medal – second place | 1982 Lausanne | Team dressage |
| Silver medal – second place | 1986 Cedar Valley | Individual dressage |
| Bronze medal – third place | 1974 Copenhagen | Team dressage |
| Bronze medal – third place | 1986 Cedar Valley | Team dressage |
| Bronze medal – third place | 1990 Stockholm | Team dressage |
European Championships
| Gold medal – first place | 1975 Kyiv | Individual dressage |
| Gold medal – first place | 1977 St. Gallen | Individual dressage |
| Silver medal – second place | 1977 St. Gallen | Team dressage |
| Silver medal – second place | 1979 Aarhus | Individual dressage |
| Silver medal – second place | 1981 Laxenburg | Individual dressage |
| Silver medal – second place | 1981 Laxenburg | Team dressage |
| Silver medal – second place | 1987 Goodwood | Team dressage |
| Bronze medal – third place | 1973 Aachen | Team dressage |
| Bronze medal – third place | 1975 Kyiv | Team dressage |
| Bronze medal – third place | 1979 Aarhus | Team dressage |
| Bronze medal – third place | 1983 Aachen | Team dressage |

Christine Stückelberger (born 22 May 1947) is a Swiss retired equestrian, who won an individual gold medal in dressage at the 1976 Summer Olympics. She was the first, and along with ski jumper Simon Ammann, only Swiss sportsperson to compete at six Olympics: 1972, 1976, 1984, 1988, 1996, and 2000.

== See also ==
- List of athletes with the most appearances at Olympic Games

Olympic Games
| Preceded by | Flagbearer for Switzerland; Los Angeles 1984 | Succeeded by Cornelia Bürki |
