= Equestrian at the 1972 Summer Olympics – Team dressage =

Individual dressage at the Games of the XX Olympiad
- Venue: Dressage Facility Nymphenburg
- Date: 7 September 1972
- Competitors: 30 (10 teams) from 10 nations

Medalists
1st place, gold medalist(s)		Yelena Petushkova; Ivan Kizimov; Ivan Kalita	Soviet Union
2nd place, silver medalist(s)		Liselott Linsenhoff; Josef Neckermann; Karin Schlüter	West Germany
3rd place, bronze medalist(s)		Ulla Håkansson; Ninna Swaab; Maud von Rosen	Sweden

The team dressage in equestrian at the 1972 Olympic Games in Munich was held at Dressage Facility Nymphenburg on 7 September.

== Competition format ==
The team medals were awarded after the Grand-Prix portion of the individual competition. After the Grand-Prix portion of the individual event the three rides of each team were added up and the highest score was the winner, all three scores counted towards the final. Both the team and the individual competitions ran concurrently.

== Results ==
Rank	Names	Horses	Grand Prix	Total
1st place, gold medalist(s)	Soviet Union; Yelena Petushkova; Ivan Kizimov; Ivan Kalita	Pepel; Ikhor; Tarif	1747; 1701; 1647	5095
2nd place, silver medalist(s)	West Germany; Liselott Linsenhoff; Josef Neckermann; Karin Schlüter	Piaff; Venetia; Liostro	1763; 1706; 1614	5083
3rd place, bronze medalist(s)	Sweden; Ulla Håkansson; Ninna Swaab; Maud von Rosen	Ajax; Casanova; Lucky Boy	1649; 1622; 1578	4849
4	Denmark; Aksel Mikkelsen; Ulla Petersen; Charlotte Ingemann	Talisman; Chigwell; Souliman	1597; 1534; 1475	4606
5	East Germany; Gerhard Brockmüller; Wolfgang Müller; Horst Köhler	Marios; Semafor; Imanuel	1545; 1521; 1486	4552
6	Canada; Christilot Hanson-Boylen; Cindy Neale-Ishoy; Lorraine Stubbs	Armagnac; Bonne Année; Venezuela	1615; 1424; 1379	4418
7	Switzerland; Christine Stückelberger; Hermann Dür; Marita Aeschbacher	Granat; Sod; Charlamp	1528; 1466; 1389	4383
8	Netherlands; Anny van Doorne; Cees Benedictus; John Swaab	Pericles; Turista; Maharadscha	1480; 1420; 1409	4309
9	United States; Edith Master; John Winnett; Lois Stephens	Dahlwitz; Reinald; Fasching	1480; 1458; 1345	4283
10	Great Britain; Lorna Johnstone; Jennie Loriston-Clarke; Margaret Lawrence	El Farruco; Kadett; San Fernando	1576; 1450; 1242	4268
