= Equestrian at the 1972 Summer Olympics – Individual dressage =

Individual dressage at the Games of the XX Olympiad
- Venue: Dressage Facility Nymphenburg
- Date: 7–9 September 1972
- Competitors: 33

Medalists
1st place, gold medalist(s)		Liselott Linsenhoff	West Germany
2nd place, silver medalist(s)		Yelena Petushkova	Soviet Union
3rd place, bronze medalist(s)		Josef Neckermann	West Germany

The individual dressage in equestrian at the 1972 Olympic Games in Munich was held at Dressage Facility Nymphenburg with the Grand-Prix on 7 September and the ride-off on 9 September.

== Competition format ==
The individual medals were only awarded based on the results of the ride-off, with the Grand Prix serving as a qualifying round for the ride-off. The top twelve in the Grand Prix qualified for the ride-off only the top 12 qualifiers were eligible to medal. This was a first for this event as in years past the combined Grand Prix and ride-off score would determine the medalists.

== Results ==
Rider	Nation	Horse	Grand Prix	Rank	Ride-off	Overall
Liselott Linsenhoff	West Germany	Piaff	1763	1 Q	1229	1st place, gold medalist(s)
Yelena Petushkova	Soviet Union	Pepel	1747	2 Q	1185	2nd place, silver medalist(s)
Josef Neckermann	West Germany	Venetia	1706	3 Q	1177	3rd place, bronze medalist(s)
Ivan Kizimov	Soviet Union	Ikhor	1701	4 Q	1159	4
Ivan Kalita	Soviet Union	Tarif	1647	6 Q	1130	5
Ulla Håkansson	Sweden	Ajax	1649	5 Q	1126	6
Karin Schlüter	West Germany	Liostro	1614	9 Q	1113	7
Maud von Rosen	Sweden	Lucky Boy	1578	11 Q	1088	8
Christilot Hanson-Boylen	Canada	Armagnac	1615	8 Q	1081	9
Ninna Swaab	Sweden	Casanova	1622	7 Q	1067	10
Aksel Malling Mikkelsen	Denmark	Talisman	1597	10 Q	1060	11
Lorna Johnstone	Great Britain	El Farruco	1576	12 Q	1036	12
Gerhard Brockmüller	East Germany	Marios	1545	13		
Ulla Petersen	Denmark	Chigwell	1534	14		
Christine Stückelberger	Switzerland	Granat	1528	15		
Wolfgang Müller	East Germany	Semafor	1521	16		
Horst Köhler	East Germany	Imanuel	1486	17		
Anny van Doorne	Netherlands	Pericles	1480	T18		
Edith Master	United States	Dahlwitz	1480	T18		
Charlotte Ingemann	Denmark	Souliman	1475	20		
Hermann Dür	Switzerland	Sod	1466	21		
John Winnett	United States	Reinald	1458	22		
Patrick le Rolland	France	Cramique	1451	23		
Jennie Loriston-Clarke	Great Britain	Kadett	1450	24		
Sylvio de Rezende	Brazil	Othelo	1431	25		
Cindy Neale-Ishoy	Canada	Bonne Année	1424	26		
Cees Benedictus-Lieftinck	Netherlands	Turista	1420	27		
John Swaab	Netherlands	Maharadscha	1409	28		
Marita Aeschbacher	Switzerland	Charlamp	1389	29		
Lorraine Stubbs	Canada	Venezuela	1379	30		
Lois Stephens	United States	Fasching	1345	31		
Kikuko Inoue	Japan	Don Carlos	1313	32		
Margaret Lawrence	Great Britain	San Fernando	1242	33		
Francisco d'Alessandri	Argentina	Comalero	DNS			
Juan José Vargas	Argentina	Pincen	DNS			
