= Equestrian at the 1968 Summer Olympics – Individual dressage =

Equestrian at the Olympics

Individual dressage at the Games of the XIX Olympiad
- Venue: Campo Marte
- Date: 24–25 October 1968
- Competitors: 26 from 9 nations

Medalists
1st place, gold medalist(s)		Ivan Kizimov	Soviet Union
2nd place, silver medalist(s)		Josef Neckermann	West Germany
3rd place, bronze medalist(s)		Reiner Klimke	West Germany

The individual dressage at the 1968 Summer Olympics took place between 24 and 25 October, at the Campo Marte. The event was open to men and women. The competition was held over two rounds; the top 7 horse and rider pairs in the first round advanced to the second round. The total score for both rounds determined final ranking.

== Results ==
26 riders competed.

Rank	Rider	Nation	Horse	Round 1		Round 2		Total
Rank	Rider	Nation	Horse	Score	Rank	Score	Rank	Total
1st place, gold medalist(s)	Ivan Kizimov	Soviet Union	Ijor	908	2	664	1	1572
2nd place, silver medalist(s)	Josef Neckermann	West Germany	Mariano	948	1	598	7	1546
3rd place, bronze medalist(s)	Reiner Klimke	West Germany	Dux	896	3	641	2	1537
4	Ivan Kalita	Soviet Union	Absent	879	4	640	3	1519
5	Horst Köhler	East Germany	Neuschnee	875	5	600	5	1475
6	Yelena Petushkova	Soviet Union	Pepel	870	6	601	4	1471
7	Gustav Fischer	Switzerland	Wald	866	7	599	6	1465
8	Liselott Linsenhoff	West Germany	Piaff	855	8	did not advance		
9	Henri Chammartin	Switzerland	Wolfdietrich	845	9	did not advance		
10	Marianne Gossweiler	Switzerland	Stephan	836	10	did not advance		
11	Domini Lawrence	Great Britain	San Fernando	793	11	did not advance		
12	Gerhard Brockmüller	East Germany	Tristan	789	12	did not advance		
13	Lorna Johnstone	Great Britain	El Guapo	777	13	did not advance		
14	Johanna Hall	Great Britain	Conversano Caprice	762	14	did not advance		
15	Inez Fischer-Credo	Canada	Marius	732	15	did not advance		
16	Guillermo Squella	Chile	Colchagüino	693	16	did not advance		
16	Wolfgang Müller	East Germany	Marios	693	16	did not advance		
18	Federico Serrano	Mexico	Marko	689	18	did not advance		
19	Christilot Hanson-Boylen	Canada	Bonheur	677	19	did not advance		
20	Antonio Piraino	Chile	Ciclón	672	20	did not advance		
21	Kyra Downton	United States	Cadet	657	21	did not advance		
22	Patricio Escudero	Chile	Prete	650	22	did not advance		
23	Edith Master	United States	Helios	646	23	did not advance		
24	Donnan Plumb	United States	Attache	616	24	did not advance		
25	Zoltan Sztehlo	Canada	Virtuose	603	25	did not advance		
26	Julio Herrera	Mexico	Otard	537	26	did not advance		
