= Equestrian at the 1968 Summer Olympics – Team dressage =

Equestrian at the Olympics

Team dressage at the Games of the XIX Olympiad
- Venue: Campo Marte
- Date: 24 October 1968
- Competitors: 24 (8 teams) from 8 nations

Medalists
1st place, gold medalist(s)		Reiner Klimke; Liselott Linsenhoff; Josef Neckermann	West Germany
2nd place, silver medalist(s)		Ivan Kalita; Ivan Kizimov; Yelena Petushkova	Soviet Union
3rd place, bronze medalist(s)		Henri Chammartin; Gustav Fischer; Marianne Gossweiler	Switzerland

The team dressage at the 1968 Summer Olympics took place on 24 October, at the Campo Marte. The event was open to men and women. The team dressage competition used the results of the first round of the individual dressage competition. The combined score of the three team members in that round was the team score.

== Results ==
8 teams, or 24 riders, competed.

Rank	Nation	Individual results			Total
Rank	Nation	Rider	Horse	Score	Total
1st place, gold medalist(s)	West Germany	Josef Neckermann	Mariano	948	2699
1st place, gold medalist(s)	West Germany	Reiner Klimke	Dux	896	2699
1st place, gold medalist(s)	West Germany	Liselott Linsenhoff	Piaff	855	2699
2nd place, silver medalist(s)	Soviet Union	Ivan Kizimov	Ijor	908	2657
2nd place, silver medalist(s)	Soviet Union	Ivan Kalita	Absent	879	2657
2nd place, silver medalist(s)	Soviet Union	Yelena Petushkova	Pepel	870	2657
3rd place, bronze medalist(s)	Switzerland	Gustav Fischer	Wald	866	2547
3rd place, bronze medalist(s)	Switzerland	Henri Chammartin	Wolfdietrich	845	2547
3rd place, bronze medalist(s)	Switzerland	Marianne Gossweiler	Stephan	836	2547
4	East Germany	Horst Köhler	Neuschnee	875	2375
4	East Germany	Gerhard Brockmüller	Tristan	789	2375
4	East Germany	Wolfgang Müller	Marios	693	2375
5	Great Britain	Margaret Lawrence	San Fernando	793	2332
5	Great Britain	Lorna Johnstone	El Guapo	777	2332
5	Great Britain	Johanna Hall	Conversano Caprice	762	2332
6	Chile	Guillermo Squella	Colchaguino	693	2015
6	Chile	Antonio Piraino	Ciclón	672	2015
6	Chile	Patricio Escudero	Prete	650	2015
7	Canada	Inez Fischer-Credo	Marius	732	2012
7	Canada	Christilot Hanson-Boylen	Bonheur	677	2012
7	Canada	Zoltan Sztehlo	Virtuose	603	2012
8	United States	Kyra Downton	Cadet	657	1919
8	United States	Edith Master	Helios	646	1919
8	United States	Donnan Plumb	Attache	616	1919
