= Deaths in June 1990 =

The following is a list of notable deaths in June 1990.

Entries for each day are listed alphabetically by surname. A typical entry lists information in the following sequence:

- Name, age, country of citizenship at birth, subsequent country of citizenship (if applicable), reason for notability, cause of death (if known), and reference.

== June 1990 ==
=== 1 ===
- Eric Barker, 78, English actor (Carry On).
- Wilhelm Borchert, 83, German actor.
- Dow Hover, 89, American executioner, suicide by carbon monoxide poisoning.
- Wieslaw Kielar, 70, Polish filmmaker and author.
- Charan Singh, 83, Indian spiritual leader.

=== 2 ===
- Ivor Aldridge, 90, Australian rules footballer.
- Claude Chabauty, 80, French mathematician.
- Walter Davis, 57, American pianist, liver and kidney disease.
- Sir Rex Harrison, 82, English actor (My Fair Lady, Doctor Dolittle, Cleopatra), Oscar winner (1965), pancreatic cancer.
- Shriram Sharma, 78, Indian author and freedom fighter.

=== 3 ===
- Tom Brown, 77, American actor, lung cancer.
- Cécile Lesprit-Poirier, 84, French Olympic diver (1936).
- Robert Noyce, 62, American physicist and entrepreneur (Intel), heart attack.
- Richard Sohl, 37, American musician, heart attack.
- Juan Rovira Tarazona, 60, Spanish politician.
- Aino Taube, 77, Swedish actress.

=== 4 ===
- Stiv Bators, 40, American punk rock vocalist and guitarist, traffic collision.
- Yulian Bromley, 69, Soviet anthropologist.
- René Desroches, 84, French Olympic middle-distance runner (1936).
- Robert Edwards, 85, British politician.
- Jack Gilford, 81, American actor (Save the Tiger, Cocoon, Catch-22), stomach cancer.
- Ivor Raymonde, 63, British musician.
- Antônio da Silveira, 84, Brazilian Olympic sports shooter (1932).
- Roma Wagner, 77, Austrian Olympic swimmer (1936).

=== 5 ===
- Abdul Aziz, 77, Sri Lankan politician.
- Luís Viana Filho, 82, Brazilian politician.
- Jim Hodder, 42, American drummer (Steely Dan), drowned.
- Vasily Kuznetsov, 89, Soviet politician, acting head of state (1982–1983, 1984, 1985).
- Charles Lambert, 58, French Olympic water polo player (1960).
- Fred Stenson, 75, Canadian politician, member of the House of Commons of Canada (1962–1965).
- Peter Throckmorton, 61, American archaeologist and photojournalist.

=== 6 ===
- Albert Alderman, 82, English cricketer and footballer.
- Aurora de Albornoz, 64, Spanish academic, cerebral hemorrhage.
- Mato Dukovac, 71, Yugoslav flying ace during World War II .
- Marcel Grignon, 75, French cinematographer.
- Sobir Kamolov, 80, Soviet politician.
- Butch Lindley, 42, American racing driver, racing accident.
- Joe Loss, 80, British musician.
- Fyodor Remezov, 93, Soviet general.

=== 7 ===
- Robert Perceval Armitage, 83, British colonial administrator.
- Barbara Baxley, 67, American actress and singer, heart attack.
- Lou Blackburn, 67, American trombonist.
- Mary Katherine Campbell, 84, American beauty pageant contestant.
- Adrian Gore, 90, British army officer and cricketer.
- Alfredo Poveda, 64, Ecuadorian politician, interim president (1976–1979), heart attack.
- Moh Yoon-sook, 80, South Korean poet.
- Petar Šegvić, 59, Yugoslav Olympic rower (1952).

=== 8 ===
- Rafael Cabrera, 65, Cuban baseball player.
- José Figueres Ferrer, 83, Costa Rican politician, president (1948–1949, 1953–1958, 1970–1974).
- Herbie Matthews, 76, Australian rules football player.
- Neb Stewart, 72, American baseball player (Philadelphia Phillies).
- Remy Van Lierde, 74, Belgian flying ace during World War II.

=== 9 ===
- Asad Bhopali, 68, Indian lyricist and poet.
- James Carreras, 81, British film producer.
- Charles Cumont, 88, Belgian general and Olympic pentathlete (1928).
- Eric Fletcher, Baron Fletcher, 87, British politician.
- John Holland, 63, New Zealand Olympic hurdler (1948, 1952), cancer.
- Angus McBean, 86, Welsh photographer.

=== 10 ===
- Russel Carrero, 39, Nicaraguan Olympic sprinter (1972).
- André Conrardy, 62, Luxembourgian Olympic canoeist (1960).
- Ludvig Holm-Olsen, 76, Norwegian linguist.
- Fritz Huhn, 89, German Olympic high jumper (1928).
- Jack Lyngcoln, 80, Australian rules footballer.
- Hanna Olsen, 100, Swedish Olympic fencer (1924, 1928).
- Hubert Rostaing, 71, French musician.

=== 11 ===
- Vicente Aguirre, 89, Argentine football player.
- Irakly Andronikov, 81, Soviet and Russian literature historian and media personality.
- Willy Bührer, 78, Swiss Olympic athlete (1936).
- Seosamh Mac Grianna, 89, Irish writer.
- Bram Kool, 53, Dutch racing cyclist.
- John H. Manley, 82, American nuclear physicist (Manhattan Project).
- Clyde McCoy, 86, American trumpeter, Alzheimer's disease.
- Oldřich Nejedlý, 80, Czechoslovak footballer.
- Bert Norris, 91, English Olympic runner (1936).
- Joan Stevens, 81, New Zealand academic.
- Isaac D. White, 89, American general.
- Vaso Čubrilović, 93, Yugoslav scholar and politician.

=== 12 ===
- Solomon Freehof, 97, British-American rabbi and scholar.
- Glen Gorbous, 59, American baseball player (Cincinnati Redlegs, Philadelphia Phillies).
- Moushegh Ishkhan, 77, Armenian diasporan poet, writer and educator.
- Gerald Marchesi, 61, Italian-Australian football player.
- George McNamara, 89, American baseball player (Washington Senators).
- Georg Meistermann, 78, German painter.
- Terence O'Neill, 75, Northern Irish politician, prime minister (1963–1969), cancer.
- Billy Taylor, 71, Canadian ice hockey player.
- Jim Walkup, 94, American baseball player (Detroit Tigers).
- Willy Ørskov, 69, Danish sculptor.

=== 13 ===
- Antony Andrewes, 80, English historian.
- Barbara Claßen, 32, German Olympic judoka (1988), suicide.
- Gidsken Jakobsen, 81, Norwegian aviator.
- Ra'ana Liaquat Ali Khan, 85, Pakistani politician, first lady (1947–1951).
- Michiyo Kogure, 72, Japanese actress.
- Frank McGuren, 80, Australian politician.
- Thomas Ponsonby, 3rd Baron Ponsonby of Shulbrede, 59, British politician.

=== 14 ===
- Erna Berger, 89, German singer.
- Ted Buckle, 65, English football player.
- Jay Gorney, 93, American songwriter.
- Ralf Liivar, 87, Estonian Olympic football player (1924).
- Chet McNabb, 69, American basketball player.
- Roy Nutt, 59, American computer engineer, lung cancer.
- Jean-François Pintat, 66, French politician.
- Heinrich Reinhardt, 87, German-Argentine chess player.

=== 15 ===
- Nobuo Arai, 80–81, Japanese Olympic swimmer (1928).
- St. Clair Drake, 79, American sociologist.
- Raymond Huntley, 86, English actor.
- Cynthia Irwin-Williams, 54, American archaeologist.
- Bucky Jacobs, 77, American baseball player (Washington Senators).
- Halvor Kongsjorden, 78, Norwegian Olympic sports shooter (1948).
- Józef Machnik, 58, Polish footballer.
- George Nakashima, 85, American furniture designer.
- Leonard Sachs, 80, South African-British actor, kidney failure.
- Marjorie van Vliet, 67, American teacher and pilot, plane crash.

=== 16 ===
- Herman S. Bloch, 78, American chemist, heart attack.
- Tom Chilvers, 71, Australian rugby league player.
- Thomas George Cowling, 83, English astronomer.
- Dennis Dyer, 76, South African cricket player.
- Martin Gallagher, 60, Australian rugby league player.
- Truus Kerkmeester, 68, Dutch Olympic swimmer (1936).
- Megan Leigh, 26, American pornographic actress, suicide by gunshot.
- Jack K. McFall, 84, American diplomat.
- Feliciano Monti, 87, Italian Olympic footballer (1924).
- Zoltan Sztehlo, 68, Hungarian-Canadian Olympic equestrian (1968).
- Dame Eva Turner, 98, English singer.
- Ruedi Walter, 73, Swiss actor and comedian, complications from surgery.

=== 17 ===
- Konrad Bauer, 71, German flying ace during World War II.
- Henry T. Bream, 90, American baseball player.
- Mark Americus Costantino, 70, American district judge (United States District Court for the Eastern District of New York).
- Dick Elffers, 79, Dutch artist.
- Gervais Gindre, 62, French Olympic cross-country skier (1952).
- Paul Giovanni, 57, American playwright and composer, AIDS.
- Bob Hamerton, 79, Canadian Olympic swimmer (1936).
- Aleksandrs Leimanis, 76, Soviet film director.
- Francisco Solano Patiño, 66–67, Paraguayan football player.
- Ronald F. Tylecote, 74, British archaeologist.

=== 18 ===
- Arthur Bryse, 81, Australian rules footballer.
- Barbara Cason, 61, American actress, heart attack.
- Arran Hoffmann, 87, German Olympic sports shooter (1936).
- Henryk Leliwa-Roycewicz, 91, Polish Olympic equestrian (1936).
- Ronald Lewis, 80, British politician.
- Rolf Stranger, 99, Norwegian politician.
- John Edward Swindler, 46, American convicted murderer, execution by electrocution.
- Barbra Walz, 39, American fashion photographer, breast cancer.

=== 19 ===
- Isabella Smith Andrews, 84, Scottish-born New Zealand playwright.
- Charles R. Farnsley, 83, American politician, member of the U.S. House of Representatives (1965–1967), Alzheimer's disease.
- Aleksandr Goncharov, 31, Soviet field hockey player and Olympian (1980).
- Melvin Mayfield, 71, American soldier, Medal of Honor recipient.
- Børge Monberg, 84, Danish Olympic field hockey player (1928).
- Steen Eiler Rasmussen, 92, Danish architect.
- Jack Sullivan, 71, Australian rules footballer.
- Karel Sys, 76, Belgian boxer.
- Bill Westwick, 81, Canadian sports journalist.
- G. Yogasangari, Sri Lankan politician, shot.

=== 20 ===
- Ina Balin, 52, American actress (From the Terrace), pulmonary hypertension.
- Mario Dal Fabbro, 76, Italian American artist and author.
- Tom Hopkinson, 85, British journalist.
- Levin Kipnis, 95, Russian-Israeli author.
- James Nguyễn Ngọc Quang, 80, Vietnamese Roman Catholic prelate, bishop of Cần Thơ (1965–1990).
- Kōsaku Yosida, 81, Japanese mathematician.

=== 21 ===
- Cedric Belfrage, 85, English journalist.
- Neil Boyd, 75, Australian rules footballer.
- June Christy, 64, American singer, kidney failure.
- Eliahu Eilat, 86, Soviet-Israeli diplomat.
- Ross Munro, 76, Canadian war correspondent during World War II.
- Tony Sarausky, 77, American football player (New York Giants).
- Eino Valle, 58 Finnish Olympic long-distance runner (1964).
- Margaret J. Winkler, 95, American animation producer.
- Zheng Yanfen, 88, Taiwanese politician, cerebral hemorrhage.

=== 22 ===
- Norm Duncan, 67, Australian rules footballer.
- Ilya Frank, 81, Soviet nuclear physicist, Nobel Prize recipient (1958).
- Elizabeth Harwood, 52, English singer, cancer.
- Binod Kanungo, 78, Indian author, freedom fighter, and encyclopedia compiler.
- Mollie Moon, 82, American civil rights activist.
- Joseph Murumbi, 79, Kenyan politician.
- Sabeena Rafi, 71, Indian literary critic.
- Steve Stevens, 87, Australian rules footballer.

=== 23 ===
- Harindranath Chattopadhyay, 92, Indian politician, actor and playwright, cardiac arrest.
- Frank Gatliff, 62, Australian-English actor.
- Wim Kat, 85, Dutch Olympic runner (1924).
- Ellis Marcus, 72, American television writer, heart attack.
- Hermann Rahn, 77, American physiologist.
- Matthew Ward, 39, American translator, AIDS.

=== 24 ===
- Marvin Burns, 61, American Olympic water polo player (1952, 1960).
- Germán Suárez Flamerich, 83, Venezuelan politician, president (1950–1952).
- Sean Hughes, 44, British history teacher and politician, cancer.
- William Kneale, 84, English logician.
- Paul Lindemann, 72, American basketball player, Goodpasture syndrome.

=== 25 ===
- Jorge Alcalde, 78, Peruvian Olympic footballer (1936).
- Bizunesh Bekele, 53–54, Ethiopian singer.
- Sydney Boehm, 82, American filmmaker, pneumonia.
- Robert Carney, 95, American naval admiral, cardiac arrest.
- Bob Garner, 55, American football player (Los Angeles Chargers, Oakland Raiders).
- Peggy Glanville-Hicks, 77, Australian composer.
- Melba Roy Mouton, 61, American mathematician, brain cancer.
- Yevgeniya Sechenova, 71, Soviet Olympic runner (1952).
- Ronald Gene Simmons, 49, American convicted spree killer, execution by lethal injection.
- John Stoll, 76, British art director.
- Paul Stråhlman, 61, Finnish Olympic rower (1952).

=== 26 ===
- Anni Blomqvist, 80, Finnish-Swedish novelist.
- Albert Byrd, 74, American Olympic racing cyclist (1936).
- Hubert Ebner, 84, German Olympic cyclist (1932).
- Doc Kauffman, 89, German-American electric guitar engineer.
- Wolfe Kelman, 66, Austrian-American rabbi, melanoma.
- J. C. R. Licklider, 75, American computer scientist, asthma.
- Manuel de Pedrolo i Molina, 72, Spanish author of novels, short stories, poetry and plays, cancer.
- Carroll Ringwalt, 82, American football player (Portsmouth Spartans, Frankford Yellow Jackets).
- William Robins, 83, English cricketer and British Army officer.
- Hans Schwerdtfeger, 87, German-Canadian-Australian mathematician.
- James Edward Smith, 37, American convicted murderer, execution by lethal injection.
- Sidney Smith, 82, English snooker player.
- Glen Milton Storr, 68, Australian zoologist.

=== 27 ===
- Olav Benum, 92, Norwegian politician.
- Lambert Anthony Hoch, 87, American Roman Catholic prelate.
- José Marrone, 74, Argentine actor, cardiovascular disease.
- José Clemente Maurer, 90, German Cardinal of the Roman Catholic Church.
- Joe O'Rourke, 85, American baseball player (Philadelphia Phillies).
- Gilberto Román, 28, Mexican boxer and Olympian (1980), traffic collision.

=== 28 ===
- Juan Friede Alter, 89, Ukrainian-Colombian historian of Jewish descent.
- Per Bergersen, 29, Norwegian musician, assisted suicide by gunshot.
- Geoff Farrelly, 82, Australian rules footballer.
- Borys Ivchenko, 49, Ukrainian actor and film director.
- Herbert Jobst, 74, German writer.
- Bernie Winkler, 64, American football player.

=== 29 ===
- Dick Barton, 78, South African boxer and Olympian (1932).
- René Boël, 91, Belgian industrialist.
- Boyd Perry, 76, American baseball player (Detroit Tigers).
- Irving Wallace, 74, American novelist, pancreatic cancer.

=== 30 ===
- Lynne Carol, 76, British actress, heart attack.
- Marquis Childs, 87, American journalist, cardiovascular disease.
- Miguel Cuenco, 85, Filipino politician.
- Eli Whitney Debevoise, 90, American lawyer.
- Dudu Pukwana, 51, South African musician, liver failure.
- Brian Tiler, 47, English footballer and football executive, traffic collision.
