= Deaths in April 1995 =

The following is a list of notable deaths in April 1995.

Entries for each day are listed alphabetically by surname. A typical entry lists information in the following sequence:

- Name, age, country of citizenship at birth, subsequent country of citizenship (if applicable), reason for notability, cause of death (if known), and reference.

== April 1995 ==
=== 1 ===
- Charles Bell, 59, American photorealist who created large scale still lifes, AIDS.
- Stanley Adair Cain, 92, American botanist and pioneer of plant ecology and environmental studies.
- James Cameron, 56, American football coach.
- H. Adams Carter, 80, American mountaineer, language teacher, and editor of the American Alpine Journal.
- Gwyn Davies, 75, Welsh cricketer.
- Samson De Brier, 96, actor and occultist.
- Francisco Moncion, 76, Dominican-American ballet dancer.
- Achmad Nawir, 82, Indonesian footballer.
- Johnny Nicholls, 63, English football player.
- Erling Nielsen, 72, Danish Olympic field hockey player (1948, 1960).
- Lucie Rie, 93, British ceramicist, stroke.
- Víctor Valussi, 82, Argentine football player.

=== 2 ===
- Hannes Alfvén, 86, Swedish physicist.
- Gaston Étienne, 93, Belgian Olympic athlete (1928).
- Irv Frew, 87, Scottish-Canadian ice hockey player (Montreal Maroons, St. Louis Eagles, Montreal Canadiens).
- Henri Guérin, 73, French football player.
- Julius Hemphill, 57, American saxophonist and composer.
- Leo LeBlanc, 55, American country musician, guitarist, and pianist who was legally blind.
- Raúl Martínez, 67, Cuban painter, designer, photographer, muralist, and graphic artist.
- Dragoslav Mitrinović, 86, Serbian mathematician.
- Harvey Penick, 90, American golfer, coach, and writer on golf.

=== 3 ===
- Alfred J. Billes, 92, Canadian businessman and co-founder of Canadian Tire.
- Charles H. Hayes, 88, United States Marine Corps general.
- David Herbert, 86, British writer and raconteur, kidney failure.
- Fernando Huergo, 86, Argentine fencer and Olympian (1948).
- Gracita Morales, 66, Spanish actress.
- Park No-sik, 65, South Korean actor.
- Vera Szemere, 71, Hungarian actress.
- Marion Tinsley, 68, American mathematician and checkers player, pancreatic cancer.
- Bogusław Zych, 43, Polish Olympic fencer (1980, 1988), traffic collision.

=== 4 ===
- Richard Adrian, 2nd Baron Adrian, 67, British peer and physiologist.
- Lyndon Bolton, 95, British Olympic horseman (1948).
- Rita Cadillac, 58, French dancer, singer, and actress, cancer.
- Kenny Everett, 50, British comedian, AIDS-related illness.
- Abraham Kattumana, 51, Indian Catholic archbishop.
- Priscilla Lane, 79, American actress (Saboteur, Arsenic and Old Lace, The Roaring Twenties), lung cancer.
- Hansa Jivraj Mehta, 97, Indian social activist, independence activist, feminist and writer.
- Shirley Patterson, 72, Canadian-American B-movie actress, cancer.
- Paul Raymond, 82, Canadian ice hockey player (Montreal Canadiens).
- Joe Richey, 64, American college basketball player (BYU Cougars).
- Victor León Esteban San Miguel y Erce, 90, Spanish Carmelite friar.
- Jo Sinclair, 81, American novelist whose real name was Ruth Seid, cancer.

=== 5 ===
- Mike Colman, 26, American ice hockey player (San Jose Sharks).
- Nicolaas Cortlever, 79, Dutch chess master.
- Adalbert Dickhut, 71, German gymnast and Olympian (1952).
- Emilio Greco, 81, Italian sculptor, engraver, medallist, writer and poet.
- Baby K, 2, American anencephalic baby who became the center of a medical controversy, heart attack.
- Christian Pineau, 90, French Resistance fighter and politician.
- Ron Richardson, 43, American actor and operatic baritone, AIDS-related complications.
- Oskar Schnirch, 92, Austrian cinematographer.

=== 6 ===
- Ioannis Alevras, 82-83, Greek politician.
- Rogelio Farías, 45, Chilean football midfielder.
- Jan Kula, 73, Polish Olympic ski jumper (1948).
- Alton Meister, 72, American biochemist.
- Trevor Park, 67, British lecturer and politician.
- V. J. Sukselainen, 88, Finnish politician and 24th Prime Minister of Finland.

=== 7 ===
- Viktor Adamishin, 33, Russian militia captain, killed in action.
- Gordon Amos, 90, Australian cricketer.
- Peter Brinson, 75, British ballet and dance writer, lecturer, and promoter.
- Nicholas Ingram, 31, British-American murder convict, execution by electric chair.
- Philip Jebb, 68, British architect and politician.
- Bill Lange, 67, American gridiron football player (Los Angeles Rams, Baltimore Colts, Chicago Cardinals).
- George Lucas, 94, Australian rules footballer.
- Hsin Ping, 56, Taiwanese Buddhist monk, kidney cancer.
- Kannur Rajan, 58, Indian music composer.
- Frank Secory, 82, American baseball player, (Detroit Tigers, Cincinnati Reds, Chicago Cubs), and umpire.

=== 8 ===
- Maurice Allom, 89, English cricketer.
- Hans Bodensteiner, 82, German politician.
- Herb Connolly, 73, American politician from Massachusetts.
- René de Buzelet, 87, French tennis player.
- Frank Dunster, 74, Canadian Olympic ice hockey player (1948).
- George Clifton Edwards Jr., 80, American circuit judge (United States Court of Appeals for the Sixth Circuit).

=== 9 ===
- Bob Allison, 60, American baseball player (Washington Senators/Minnesota Twins).
- Nguyễn Hữu An, 68, People's Army of Vietnam general.
- Bonnie Bird, 80, American modern dancer and dance educator.
- Paola Borboni, 95, Italian stage and film actress, stroke.
- John Chamberlain, 91, American journalist, historian, columnist and literary critic.
- Robert Cobb, 37, American football player (Los Angeles Rams, Tampa Bay Buccaneers, Minnesota Vikings).
- George Hurley, 86, American gridiron football player (Boston Braves/Redskins).
- Karel Kněnický, 87, Czech Olympic sprinter (1928, 1936).
- Kazimierz Kucharski, 86, Polish Olympic sprinter (1936).
- Edda Mussolini, 84, Daughter of Italian fascist dictator Benito Mussolini.
- Henry Oliver, 92, British middle-distance runner and Olympian (1928).
- Shinnen Tagaya, 75, Japanese politician.

=== 10 ===
- Chen Yun, 89, Chinese political leader of the Chinese Communist Party.
- Morarji Desai, 99, 4th Prime Minister of India.
- Feng Depei, 88, Chinese neuroscientist and physiologist.
- Annie Fischer, 80, Hungarian pianist.
- Günter Guillaume, 68, German spy for the Stasi and politician, kidney cancer.
- Glyn Jones, 90, Welsh writer.
- Otto Kolar, 83, American basketball player.
- Hannah Lamdan, 90, Israeli politician.
- Billy Myers, 84, American baseball player (Cincinnati Reds, Chicago Cubs).
- Harold L. Ryan, 71, American district judge (United States District Court for the District of Idaho).

=== 11 ===
- E. K. Imbichi Bava, 77, Indian politician and a leader of the Communist Party of India.
- Maurice Fenn, 83, Fijian cricketer.
- T. Keith Glennan, 89, American administrator and first leader of NASA, complications from a stroke.
- Vic Hey, 82, Australian rugby player and coach.
- Nikolai Kostrov, 93, Russian Soviet painter, graphic artist, and illustrator.
- Kim Yong-ik, 74, Korean–American writer.

=== 12 ===
- Franco Cacioni, 62, Venezuelan Olympic cyclist (1956).
- Buck Cheves, 96, American college football player and referee.
- John Dowdy, 83, American politician, member of the United States House of Representatives (1952-1973).
- Constance Heaven, 83, British romance writer.
- Alberto Larraguibel, 75, Chilean Army officer and equestrian, lung cancer.
- Philip H. Lathrop, 82, American cinematographer.
- Mou Zongsan, 85, Chinese philosopher.
- Chris Pyne, 56, British jazz trombonist.

=== 13 ===
- John Austrheim, 82, Norwegian politician.
- Peter Bastiansen, 82, Norwegian politician.
- Andy Branigan, 73, Canadian ice hockey player (New York/Brooklyn Americans).
- Aristide Compagnoni, 84, Italian cross-country skier.
- Roy Fountain, 80, Australian rules footballer.
- Cocaína García, 89, Cuban baseball player.
- Edward F. Henderson, 77, British diplomat.
- Lang Jingshan, 102, Chinese photojournalist.
- Mal McMullen, 67, American basketball player and golfer.
- Hal Peck, 77, American baseball right fielder (Brooklyn Dodgers, Philadelphia Athletics, Cleveland Indians).
- Allan Scott, 88, American screenwriter.
- Bill Thurman, 74, American actor (The Last Picture Show, Silverado, Close Encounters of the Third Kind).
- Aleksandras Vanagas, 60, Lithuanian linguist and etymologist.

=== 14 ===
- Mario Carotenuto, 78, Italian actor, cancer.
- Brian Coffey, 89, Irish poet and publisher.
- Michael Fordham, 89, English child psychiatrist and Jungian analyst.
- Burl Ives, 85, American singer and actor (Cat on a Hot Tin Roof, The Big Country, Rudolph the Red-Nosed Reindeer), Oscar winner (1959), mouth cancer.
- Hildegard Lächert, 75, German female guard at several nazi concentration camps during World War II.
- Frans Möller, 98, Swedish Olympic swimmer (1920).
- António Lopes Ribeiro, 86, Portuguese film director.

=== 15 ===
- Michael Aldred, 49, British record producer, music journalist, and television presenter, AIDS-related complications.
- Emin Bektöre, 88-89, Crimean Tatar folklorist, ethnographer, lyricist, and activist.
- Cleo Brown, 87, American pianist and singer.
- Fred Cuny, 50, American humanitarian.
- Victor Klees, 87, Luxembourgian footballer and Olympic water polo player (1928).
- Gilbert Moses, 52, American film and television director, multiple myeloma.
- Harry Shoulberg, 91, American expressionist painter.
- Günter Stephan, 82, German footballer.

=== 16 ===
- Olavi Ahonen, 54, Finnish basketball player.
- Lloyd Bennett, 79, Australian rules footballer.
- Cheyenne Brando, 25, French fashion model and daughter of actor Marlon Brando, suicide by hanging.
- Cy Endfield, 80, American screenwriter, director, author, magician and inventor.
- Arthur English, 75, British actor and comedian, pulmonary emphysema.
- Josef Hügi, 65, Swiss football player.
- August E. Johansen, 89, American politician, member of the United States House of Representatives (1955-1965), Alzheimer's disease.
- Iqbal Masih, 11-12, Pakistani Christian boy who became a symbol of abusive child labour in Pakistan, homicide.
- Alfred Ryder, 79, American actor.

=== 17 ===
- Ted Ball, 56, Australian golfer.
- Jimmy D'Aquisto, 59, Italian-American luthier who built archtop guitars.
- Clark G. Fiester, 61, American businessman and government official, Assistant Secretary of the Air Force (Acquisition), plane crash.
- Sonny Boy Jeffries, 80, American baseball player.
- Anton Murray, 72, South African cricketer.
- Frank E. Resnik, 66, American chemist and CEO of Philip Morris USA.
- Max Wünsche, 80, German commander in the Waffen-SS during World War II.
- Nan Youngman, 88, English painter and educationalist.

=== 18 ===
- Elizabeth Emry, 72, American baseball player.
- Arturo Frondizi, 86, Argentine lawyer and politician, 32nd President of Argentina.
- Edward P. Gallogly, 75, American politician.
- Rafael Chaparro Madiedo, 31, Colombian writer, lupus.
- Roza Makagonova, 67, Soviet/Russian actress.

=== 19 ===
- Preston Blair, 86, American animator (Bambi, Pinocchio, Fantasia).
- J. Peter Grace, 81, American industrialist.
- Porter Hardy Jr., 91, American businessman and politician, member of the United States House of Representatives (1947-1969).
- Daniel Octobre, 91, French painter.
- Neil Paterson, 78, Scottish writer of novels, short stories and screenplays.
- Sylvio de Rezende, 77, Brazilian Olympic equestrian (1972).
- Aldo Richins, 84, American gridiron football player (Detroit Lions).
- Richard Snell, 64, American white supremacist and convicted murderer, execution by lethal injection.
- Jack Wilson, 83, American baseball player.

=== 20 ===
- Elsa Benham, 86, American silent film actress and dancer.
- Paul A. Catlin, 46, American mathematician and educator.
- Milovan Djilas, 83, Yugoslav communist politician, theorist and author.
- Harold Fong, 56, American district judge (United States District Court for the District of Hawaii).
- Sunil Jayasinghe, 39, Sri Lankan ODI cricketer, suicide.
- Gary MacGregor, 40, Canadian ice hockey player.
- Elting E. Morison, 85, American historian, military biographer, and author.
- Milton Wallace, 83, Canadian Olympic long-distance runner (1936).
- Bob Wyatt, 93, English cricketer.

=== 21 ===
- José del Carmen, 77, Colombian Olympic fencer (1956).
- Ingvar Ericsson, 81, Swedish Olympic cyclist (1936).
- Stafford Heginbotham, 61, British businessman and chairman of Bradford City football club.
- Amir Machmud, 72, Indonesian military general.
- Malcolm Murray, 90, Swedish Army general.
- Tessie O'Shea, 82, Welsh singer, instrumentalist, and actress, heart failure.
- Roberto Parra Sandoval, 73, Chilean singer-songwriter, guitarist and folklorist.
- Kang Shi'en, 80, Chinese communist revolutionary.
- Carl Whitaker, 83, American physician and family therapy pioneer.

=== 22 ===
- Carl Albert, 32, American musician, car accident.
- Violetta Bovt, 67, American-Soviet ballet dancer.
- Carlo Ceresoli, 84, Italian football goalkeeper.
- Norton Clapp, 89, American businessman.
- Charles Granger, 82, Canadian politician.
- Tony Jaros, 75, American basketball player (Chicago Stags, Minneapolis Lakers).
- Jane Kenyon, 47, American poet and translator, leukemia.
- Maggie Kuhn, 89, American activist and founder of the Gray Panthers movement, heart failure.
- Henry May, 83, New Zealand politician of the Labour Party.
- Don Pullen, 53, American jazz pianist and organist, lymphoma.
- Eddie Rucinski, 78, American football player (Brooklyn Dodgers, Chicago Cardinals, Card-Pitt).
- Joe Sheeketski, 87, American football player, coach, and college athletics administrator.
- Ben Whittam, 85, Australian rules footballer.

=== 23 ===
- Douglas Lloyd Campbell, 99, Canadian politician who served as the 13th Premier of Manitoba.
- Howard Cosell, 77, American sportscaster, heart failure.
- Viktor Getmanov, 54, Soviet/Russian football player.
- John C. Stennis, 93, American politician and U.S. Senator.
- Lonesome Sundown, 66, American blues singer and guitarist.
- Robert Selby Taylor, 86, Anglican bishop.

=== 24 ===
- Ronald Alexander, 78, American playwright.
- Hideyuki Ashihara, 50, Japanese master of karate who founded Ashihara karate, ALS.
- Lodewijk Bruckman, 91, Dutch magic realist painter.
- Stanley Burbury, 85, Australian jurist.
- Florrie Burke, 76, Irish footballer.
- John Campbell, 87, American baseball player (Washington Senators).
- Marie Epstein, 95, French actress, film director, and film preservationist.
- Iosif Kheifits, 90, Russian film director.
- Johannes Ott, 75, German art director.

=== 25 ===
- Lou Ambers, 81, American World Lightweight boxing champion.
- Art Fleming, 70, American actor and first television host of the game show Jeopardy!, pancreatic cancer.
- Andrea Fortunato, 23, Italian football player, leukemia.
- Horst-Günter Gregor, 56, German swimmer and Olympian (1954, 1968).
- Alexander Knox, 88, Canadian-British actor (Wilson, Tinker Tailor Soldier Spy, The Longest Day), bone cancer.
- Walter Marty, 84, American high jumper.
- Attilio Moresi, 61, Swiss cyclist.
- Ginger Rogers, 83, American actress (Top Hat, Kitty Foyle, Primrose Path) and dancer, Oscar winner (1941), diabetes.
- Lev Shankovsky, 91, Ukrainian military historian.
- G. M. Syed, 91, Pakistani politician.

=== 26 ===
- Bruce Bosley, 61, American football player (San Francisco 49ers, Atlanta Falcons).
- Joseph M. Bryan, 99, American insurance executive, broadcast pioneer, and philanthropist.
- Egon Franke, 82, German politician.
- Otto Friedrich, 66, American journalist, author, and historian, lung cancer.
- Sammy Jackson, 57, American actor.
- Willi Krakau, 83, German racing driver.
- Corliss Lamont, 93, American socialist and humanist philosopher.
- Al Lucas, 72, American basketball player (Boston Celtics).
- Hugh Morton, Baron Morton of Shuna, 65, Scottish lawyer and judge.
- Peter Wright, 78, English scientist and MI5 intelligence officer.

=== 27 ===
- Ivo Arčanin, 88, Yugoslav Olympic swimmer (1924).
- Silverio Blasi, 73, Italian television and stage director, actor and screenwriter.
- Albert Brown, 83, English cricketer and snooker player.
- Harold Daly, 79, Australian rules footballer.
- Katherine DeMille, 83, Canadian-American actress, Alzheimer's disease.
- Willem Frederik Hermans, 73, Dutch writer, lung cancer.
- Kent Peterson, 69, American baseball player (Cincinnati Reds, Philadelphia Phillies).
- Raphael Rabello, 32, Brazilian guitarist and composer.
- Auto Shankar, 41, Indian criminal and gangster, suicide.
- Steve Wittman, 91, Air-racer and aircraft engineer, plane crash.
- Jerauld Wright, 96, United States Navy Commander-in-Chief, pneumonia.

=== 28 ===
- Jacqueline Beaujeu-Garnier, 77, French geographer.
- Thomas Binkley, 63, American musicologist and lutenist.
- Peaches Davis, 89, Major Leagues baseball pitcher (Cincinnati Reds).
- Corky Devlin, 63, American basketball player (Fort Wayne Pistons, Minneapolis Lakers).
- Wilfrido Ma. Guerrero, 84, Filipino playwright, director, teacher and theater artist.
- Hana Janků, 54, Czech soprano.
- Gus Polidor, 33, Venezuelan baseball player (California Angels, Milwaukee Brewers, Florida Marlins), homicide.
- Stan Robinson, 84, Australian rugby league footballer.
- Henry C. Rogers, 81, American publicist.
- Andrew Salkey, 67, Panamanian novelist and poet.
- Angelo Savelli, 83, Italian painter.
- Walter Tracy, 81, English type designer, typographer and writer.

=== 29 ===
- Inger Marie Andersen, 64, Norwegian actress.
- Talley Beatty, 76, American dancer, choreographer, and teacher.
- Angier Biddle Duke, 79, American diplomat and ambassador.
- Gary Fallon, 56, American gridiron football player and coach.
- Charles McGinnis, 88, American track and field athlete and Olympian (1928).
- Ray Prim, 88, American baseball player (Washington Senators, Philadelphia Phillies, Chicago Cubs).
- Joe Prokop, 74, American football player (Chicago Rockets).

=== 30 ===
- Eric Barber, 79, English cricketer.
- Christopher Chadman, American dancer and choreographer, AIDS-related complications.
- Michael Graham Cox, 57, English actor (A Bridge Too Far, Watership Down, The Lord of the Rings).
- Maung Maung Kha, 74, Burmese politician and prime minister.
- Mārtiņš Mazūrs, 87, Latvian Olympic cyclist (1936).
