= Erling Nielsen =

Erling Nielsen may refer to:

- Erling Nielsen (field hockey) (1922–1995), Danish Olympic hockey player
- Erling Nielsen (footballer) (1935–1996), Danish footballer
- Erling Nielsen (philologist) (1920–2000), Danish philologist
