= Patrick le Rolland =

French equestrian

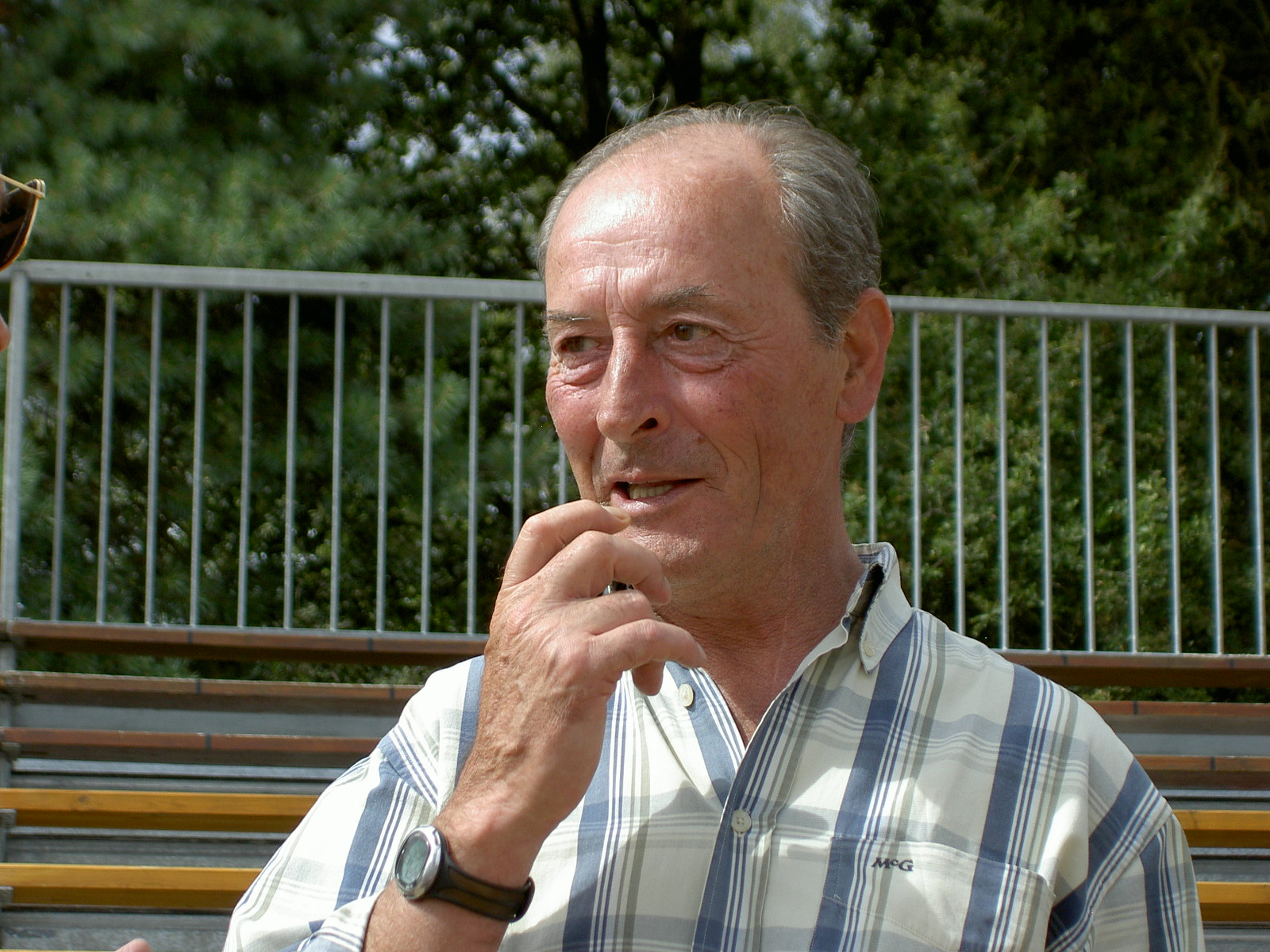
- Patrick le Rolland in 2005

Personal information
- Nationality: French
- Born: 15 May 1943; Hengoat, France
- Died: 28 August 2014 (aged 71); Varennes-sur-Loire, France

Sport
- Sport: Equestrian

Patrick le Rolland (15 May 1943 – 28 August 2014) was a French equestrian. He competed in the individual dressage event at the 1972 Summer Olympics.
