= Julio Herrera =

Julio Herrera may refer to:

- Julio Herrera (cyclist) (born 1980), track and road cyclist from Venezuela
- Julio Herrera (equestrian) (1911–?), Mexican Olympic horse rider
- Julio Herrera (politician), Peruvian politician
- Julio César Herrera (born 1977), Cuban track cyclist
- Julio Herrera Velutini (born 1971), international banker
- Julio Herrera y Obes (1841–1912), Uruguayan political figure, President of the Republic 1890–1894
- Julio Herrera y Reissig (1875–1910), Uruguayan poet, playwright and essayist
