= Squella =

Squella is a surname. Notable people with the surname include:

- Agustín Squella (born 1944), Chilean lawyer, legal philosopher, academic, writer, journalist, and politician
- Arturo Squella (born 1978), Chilean politician
- Guillermo Squella (1923–2010), Chilean equestrian
- Juan Pablo Cárdenas Squella (1949–2026), Chilean journalist and academic
- Juan Serrano Squella (1872–1929), Chilean politician
- Pablo Squella (born 1963), Chilean journalist and middle distance runner
