= Karin Rehbein =

German dressage rider

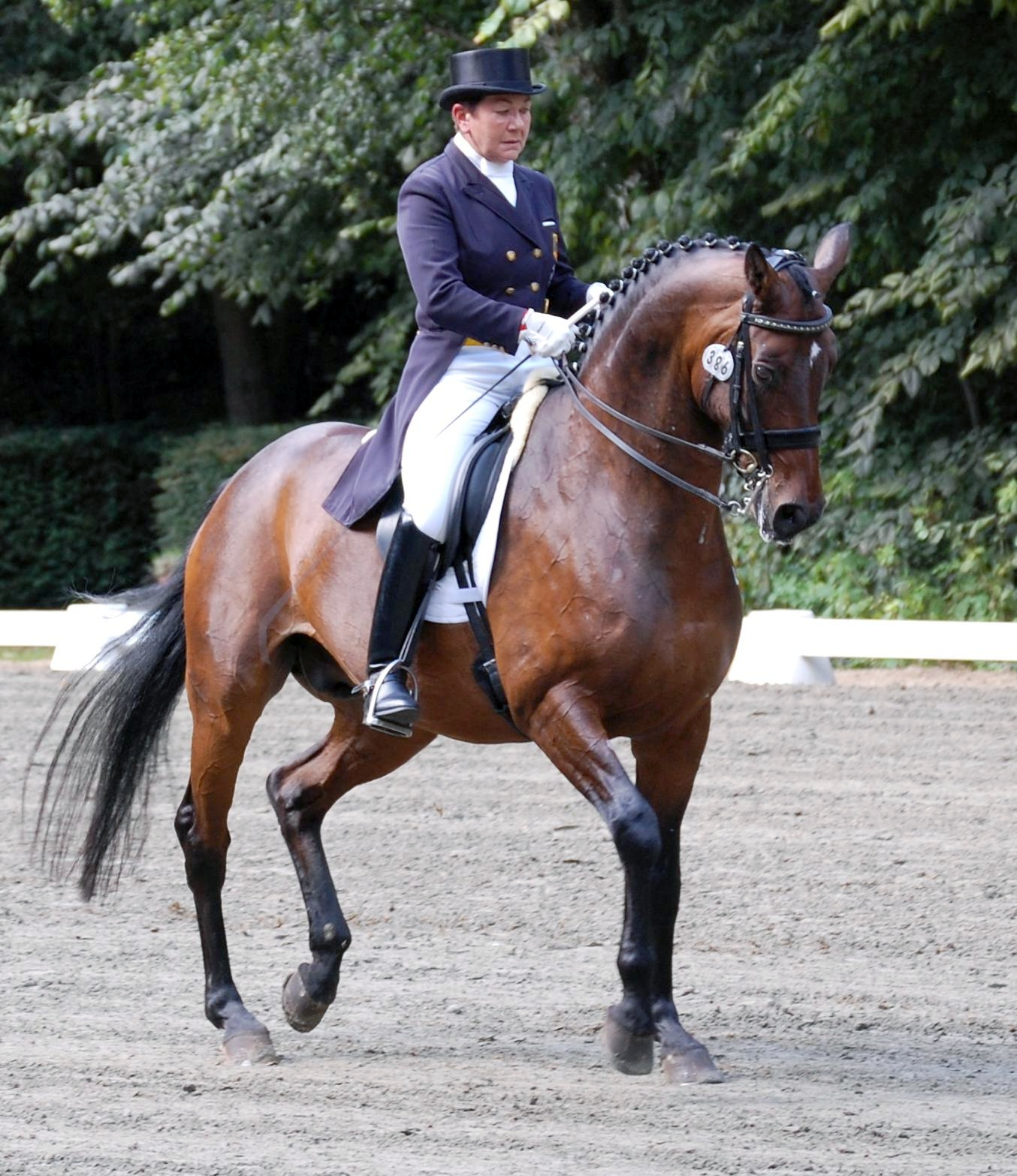
- Karin Rehbein riding World Idol (2011)

Personal information
- Born: 30 March 1949 (age 77) Aurich, West Germany
Medal record
Equestrian
Representing Germany
World Championships
Gold medal – first place	1994 The Hague	Team dressage
Gold medal – first place	1998 Rome	Team dressage
Bronze medal – third place	1994 The Hague	Freestyle dressage
European Championships
Gold medal – first place	1997 Verden	Team dressage
Bronze medal – third place	1997 Verden	Individual dressage

Karin Rehbein (born 30 March 1949 in Aurich) is a German dressage rider. Riding the stallion Donnerhall, Rehbein won multiple championships medal during the 1990s.
