= Stephen Stevens (disambiguation) =

Steven, Stephen or Steve Stephens or Stevens could refer to:

- Stephen Stevens (1793–1870), American jurist and politician
- Steve Stevens (footballer) (1903–1990), Australian rules footballer
- Steve Stephens (1930–2021), American broadcaster
- Steve Stephens (American football) (born 1957), American football player
- Steve Stevens (born 1959), American guitarist and songwriter
- Steve William Stephens (1979–2017), American murderer known as the "Facebook killer"
- Steve Stevens, fictional character, see List of Star Trek: Lower Decks characters#Steve Stevens
