= Willy Blok Hanson =

Canadian dancer and choreographer

Willy Blok Hanson (1914 – December 22, 2012) was a Javanese-born Canadian dancer and choreographer. The Toronto Star has called her a "Canadian dance legend."

== Biography ==
=== Personal life ===
Hanson was born in Java, Dutch East Indies (present-day Indonesia) in 1914. Her father was Dutch-Chinese while her mother was of French-Indonesian descent. She studied dance and gymnastics at a dance academy in Vienna, Austria, but was forced to return to the Dutch East Indies with the outbreak of World War II. She arrived back in Java during the Japanese occupation of the Dutch East Indies. She was accused of spying and espionage by Japanese authorities and imprisoned for fifty-five days.

She met her first husband, an Australian soldier, after World War II. The couple had one daughter (who was Willy Blok Hanson's only child) in 1947, Christilot Hanson, who would later become a four-time Canadian Olympic equestrian. The family moved to Toronto, Canada, in 1951. Willy Blok Hanson and her first husband divorced in the early 1970s. She remarried twice. Her second marriage was to a University of Toronto professor of aeronautical engineering. Hanson's short third marriage was to a 27-year-old medical student when she was in her seventies.

=== Career ===
Willy Blok Hanson opened her first dance studio near Bay and Bloor Streets in Toronto during the 1950s. She also joined a trio of dancers who performed weekly on CBC Television. She transitioned to choreography, creating dances and routines for prominent artistic figures, including the Canadian Film Board and film director, Norman Jewison.

Hanson owned another, well-known dance and personal training studio located at Church and Wellesley Streets before her retirement when she was 75 years old. Her client list included rappers, professional dancers and entertainment industry executives.

Hanson died at her apartment in the Church and Wellesley neighborhood of downtown Toronto on December 22, 2012, at the age of 98. She had previously joked that she planned to live to 100 in a 1991 interview with the Toronto Star, saying, "I will never surrender to old age." She was survived by her only daughter, Christilot Boylen, two grandchildren, and two great grandchildren.
