= La Roche-Derrien =

La Roche-Derrien Ar Roc'h-Derrien
- Part of La Roche-Jaudy
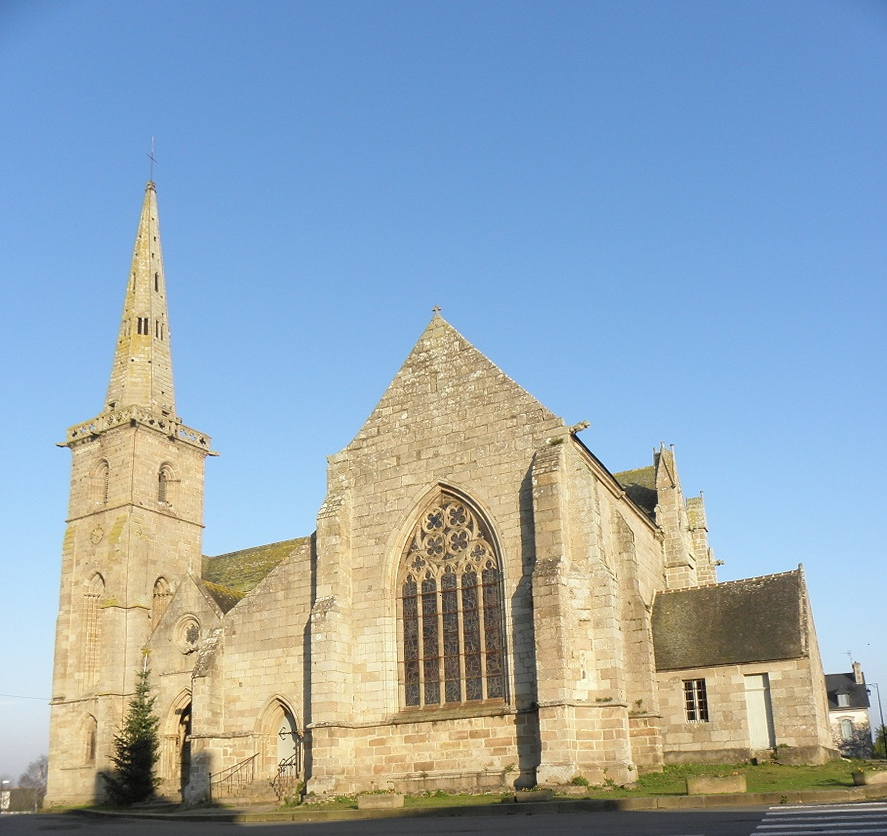
- The church of La Roche-Derrien

- Coat of arms
- Location of La Roche-Derrien
- Location within France Location within Brittany
- Coordinates: 48°44′50″N 3°15′30″W
- Country: France
- Region: Brittany
- Department: Côtes-d'Armor
- Arrondissement: Lannion
- Canton: Tréguier
- Commune: La Roche-Jaudy
- Area^{1}: 1.84 km^{2} (0.71 sq mi)
- Highest elevation: 60 m (200 ft)
- Lowest elevation: 2 m (6.6 ft)
- Population (2022): 1,064
  - Density: 578/km^{2} (1,500/sq mi)
- Time zone: UTC+01:00 (CET)
  - Summer (DST): UTC+02:00 (CEST)
- Postal code: 22450
- ^{1} French Land Register data, which excludes lakes, ponds, glaciers > 1 km^{2} (0.386 sq mi or 247 acres) and river estuaries.

La Roche-Derrien (French pronunciation: [la ʁɔʃ dɛʁjɛ̃]; Breton: Ar Roc'h-Derrien) is a former commune in the Côtes-d'Armor department of Brittany in northwestern France. On 1 January 2019, it was merged into the new commune La Roche-Jaudy.

== Population ==
Inhabitants of La Roche-Derrien are called rochois in French.

Historical population
| Year | Pop. | ±% p.a. |
|---|---|---|
| 1962 | 967 | — |
| 1968 | 946 | −0.37% |
| 1975 | 971 | +0.37% |
| 1982 | 963 | −0.12% |
| 1990 | 883 | −1.08% |
| 1999 | 1,012 | +1.53% |
| 2006 | 1,069 | +0.79% |
| 2022 | 1,064 | −0.03% |
Source: EHESS and INSEE

== See also ==
- Communes of the Côtes-d'Armor department
