= Pommerit-Jaudy =

Pommerit-Jaudy Peurid-ar-Roc'h
- Part of La Roche-Jaudy
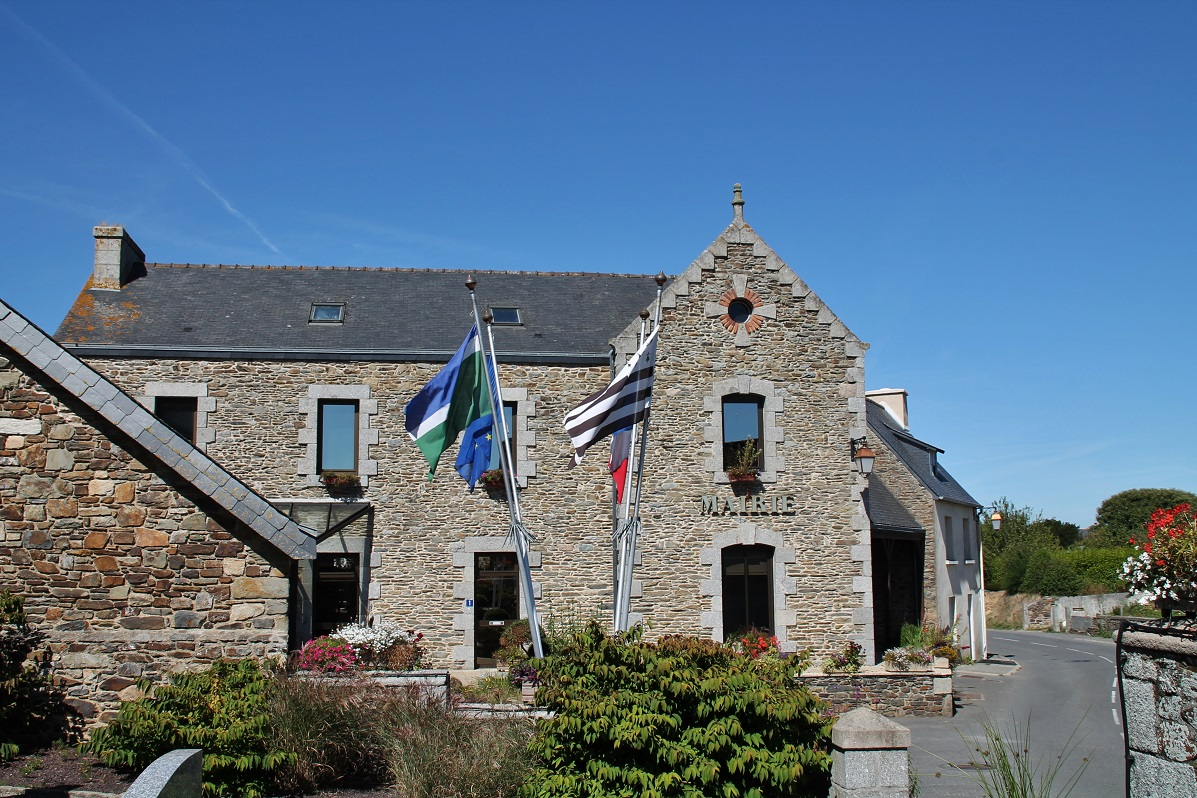
- The town hall of Pommerit-Jaudy
- Location of Pommerit-Jaudy
- Location within France Location within Brittany
- Coordinates: 48°43′58″N 3°14′27″W
- Country: France
- Region: Brittany
- Department: Côtes-d'Armor
- Arrondissement: Lannion
- Canton: Tréguier
- Commune: La Roche-Jaudy
- Area^{1}: 20.37 km^{2} (7.86 sq mi)
- Highest elevation: 94 m (308 ft)
- Lowest elevation: 2 m (6.6 ft)
- Population (2022): 1,181
  - Density: 57.98/km^{2} (150.2/sq mi)
- Time zone: UTC+01:00 (CET)
  - Summer (DST): UTC+02:00 (CEST)
- Postal code: 22450
- ^{1} French Land Register data, which excludes lakes, ponds, glaciers > 1 km^{2} (0.386 sq mi or 247 acres) and river estuaries.

Pommerit-Jaudy (French pronunciation: [pɔmʁit ʒodi]; Breton: Peurid-ar-Roc'h) is a former commune in the Côtes-d'Armor department of Brittany in northwestern France. On 1 January 2019, it was merged into the new commune of La Roche-Jaudy.

== Geography ==
=== Climate ===
Pommerit-Jaudy has an oceanic climate (Köppen climate classification Cfb). The average annual temperature in Pommerit-Jaudy is 11.7 °C (53.1 °F). The average annual rainfall is 891.0 mm (35.08 in) with December as the wettest month. The temperatures are highest on average in August, at around 17.6 °C (63.7 °F), and lowest in January, at around 6.8 °C (44.2 °F). The highest temperature ever recorded in Pommerit-Jaudy was 37.2 °C (99.0 °F) on 9 August 2003; the coldest temperature ever recorded was −8.5 °C (16.7 °F) on 12 January 1987.

Climate data for Pommerit-Jaudy (1981–2010 averages, extremes 1987−present)
Month	Jan	Feb	Mar	Apr	May	Jun	Jul	Aug	Sep	Oct	Nov	Dec	Year
Record high °C (°F)	16.2 (61.2)	22.3 (72.1)	24.3 (75.7)	28.0 (82.4)	29.7 (85.5)	33.5 (92.3)	36.8 (98.2)	37.2 (99.0)	31.5 (88.7)	30.6 (87.1)	21.6 (70.9)	17.4 (63.3)	37.2 (99.0)
Mean daily maximum °C (°F)	9.4 (48.9)	10.1 (50.2)	12.0 (53.6)	13.6 (56.5)	16.8 (62.2)	19.5 (67.1)	21.6 (70.9)	22.3 (72.1)	20.0 (68.0)	16.3 (61.3)	12.3 (54.1)	9.7 (49.5)	15.3 (59.5)
Daily mean °C (°F)	6.8 (44.2)	7.2 (45.0)	8.5 (47.3)	9.7 (49.5)	12.8 (55.0)	15.3 (59.5)	17.5 (63.5)	17.6 (63.7)	15.6 (60.1)	12.8 (55.0)	9.3 (48.7)	7.1 (44.8)	11.7 (53.1)
Mean daily minimum °C (°F)	4.2 (39.6)	4.2 (39.6)	5.1 (41.2)	5.9 (42.6)	8.8 (47.8)	11.1 (52.0)	12.9 (55.2)	13.0 (55.4)	11.3 (52.3)	9.3 (48.7)	6.4 (43.5)	4.5 (40.1)	8.1 (46.6)
Record low °C (°F)	−8.5 (16.7)	−6.5 (20.3)	−3.2 (26.2)	−2.8 (27.0)	−0.6 (30.9)	3.2 (37.8)	6.0 (42.8)	5.2 (41.4)	2.2 (36.0)	−3.1 (26.4)	−5.3 (22.5)	−6.7 (19.9)	−8.5 (16.7)
Average precipitation mm (inches)	91.3 (3.59)	86.4 (3.40)	64.0 (2.52)	73.1 (2.88)	59.7 (2.35)	54.0 (2.13)	51.7 (2.04)	45.1 (1.78)	57.1 (2.25)	96.1 (3.78)	101.9 (4.01)	110.6 (4.35)	891.0 (35.08)
Average precipitation days (≥ 1.0 mm)	14.2	13.4	11.8	12.3	9.4	8.0	9.4	8.3	9.5	14.4	15.4	15.0	141.2
Source: Météo France

== Population ==
Historical population
Year	Pop.	±% p.a.
1962	1,202	—
1968	1,036	−2.45%
1975	958	−1.11%
1982	959	+0.01%
1990	972	+0.17%
1999	990	+0.20%
2006	1,152	+2.19%
2022	1,181	+0.16%
Source: EHESS and INSEE

Inhabitants of Pommerit-Jaudy are called pommeritains in French.

== See also ==
- Communes of the Côtes-d'Armor department
