= Pouldouran =

Pouldouran Pouldouran
- Part of La Roche-Jaudy
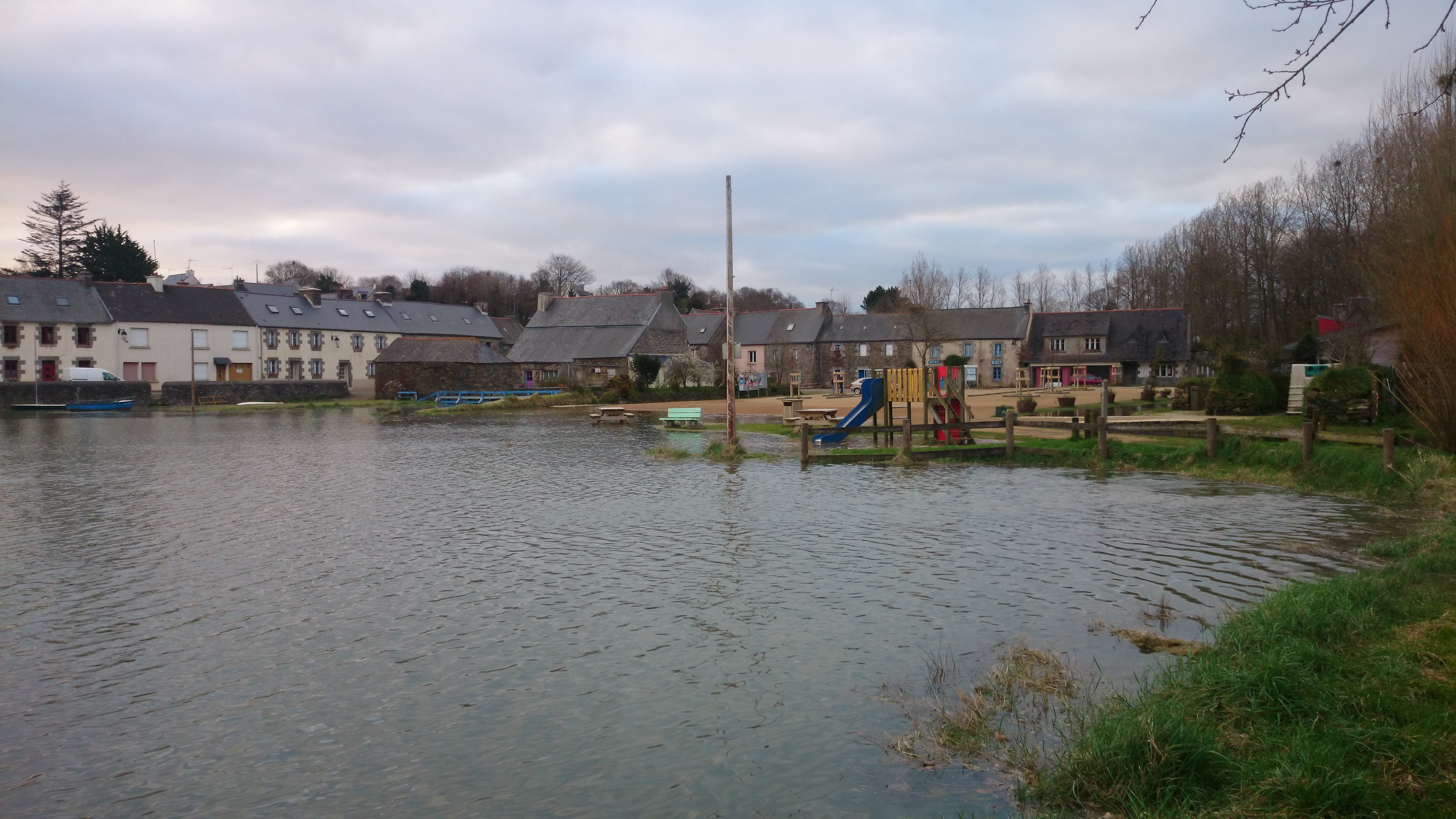
- The village of Pouldouran

- Coat of arms
- Location of Pouldouran
- Location within France Location within Brittany
- Coordinates: 48°45′55″N 3°11′52″W
- Country: France
- Region: Brittany
- Department: Côtes-d'Armor
- Arrondissement: Lannion
- Canton: Tréguier
- Commune: La Roche-Jaudy
- Area^{1}: 1.02 km^{2} (0.39 sq mi)
- Highest elevation: 50 m (160 ft)
- Lowest elevation: 0 m (0 ft)
- Population (2023): 155
  - Density: 152/km^{2} (394/sq mi)
- Time zone: UTC+01:00 (CET)
  - Summer (DST): UTC+02:00 (CEST)
- Postal code: 22450
- ^{1} French Land Register data, which excludes lakes, ponds, glaciers > 1 km^{2} (0.386 sq mi or 247 acres) and river estuaries.

Pouldouran (French pronunciation: [pulduʁɑ̃]; Occitan: Pouldouran) is a former commune in the Côtes-d'Armor department of Brittany in northwestern France. On 1 January 2019, it was merged into the new commune La Roche-Jaudy. Inhabitants of Pouldouran are called pouldourannais in French.

== Breton language ==
The municipality launched a linguistic plan through Ya d'ar brezhoneg on 25 November 2005.

== See also ==
- Communes of the Côtes-d'Armor department
