= Federico Serrano =

Mexican equestrian

Personal information
- Born: 28 September 1944 (age 80); Mexico City, Mexico

Sport
- Sport: Equestrian

Federico Serrano (born 28 September 1944) is a Mexican equestrian. He competed in the individual dressage event at the 1968 Summer Olympics.
