= La Roche-Jaudy =

La Roche-Jaudy Roc'h-ar-Yeodi
- Commune
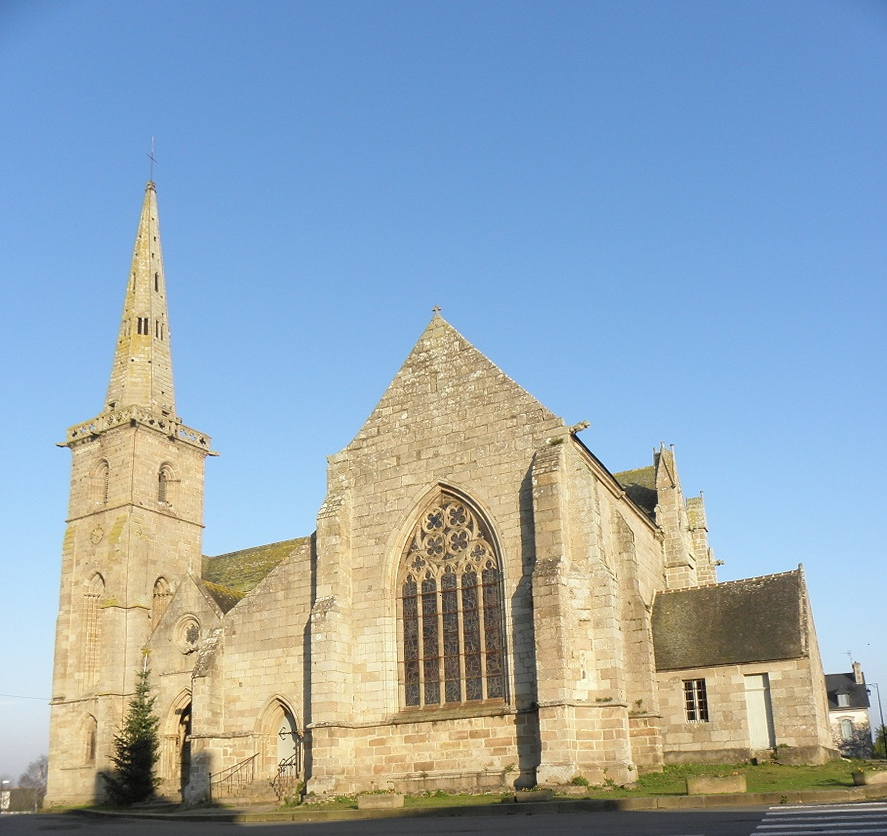
- The church of La Roche-Derrien

- Coat of arms
- Location of La Roche-Jaudy
- Location within France Location within Brittany
- Coordinates: 48°44′50″N 3°15′30″W
- Country: France
- Region: Brittany
- Department: Côtes-d'Armor
- Arrondissement: Lannion
- Canton: Tréguier
- Intercommunality: Lannion-Trégor Communauté

Government
  - Mayor (2020–2026): Jean-Louis Éven
- Area^{1}: 29.42 km^{2} (11.36 sq mi)
- Highest elevation: 94 m (308 ft)
- Lowest elevation: 0 m (0 ft)
- Population (2023): 2,629
  - Density: 89.36/km^{2} (231.4/sq mi)
- Time zone: UTC+01:00 (CET)
  - Summer (DST): UTC+02:00 (CEST)
- INSEE/Postal code: 22264 /22450
- ^{1} French Land Register data, which excludes lakes, ponds, glaciers > 1 km^{2} (0.386 sq mi or 247 acres) and river estuaries.

La Roche-Jaudy (French pronunciation: [la ʁɔʃ ʒodi]; Breton: Roc'h-ar-Yeodi) is a commune in the Côtes-d'Armor department of Brittany in northwestern France. It was established on 1 January 2019 by the merger of the former communes of La Roche-Derrien (the seat), Hengoat, Pommerit-Jaudy and Pouldouran.

== Geography ==
=== Climate ===
La Roche-Jaudy has an oceanic climate (Köppen climate classification Cfb). The average annual temperature in La Roche-Jaudy is 11.7 °C (53.1 °F). The average annual rainfall is 891.0 mm (35.08 in) with December as the wettest month. The temperatures are highest on average in August, at around 17.6 °C (63.7 °F), and lowest in January, at around 6.8 °C (44.2 °F). The highest temperature ever recorded in La Roche-Jaudy was 37.2 °C (99.0 °F) on 9 August 2003; the coldest temperature ever recorded was −8.5 °C (16.7 °F) on 12 January 1987.

Climate data for Pommerit-Jaudy, La Roche-Jaudy (1981–2010 averages, extremes 1987−present)
Month	Jan	Feb	Mar	Apr	May	Jun	Jul	Aug	Sep	Oct	Nov	Dec	Year
Record high °C (°F)	16.2 (61.2)	22.3 (72.1)	24.3 (75.7)	28.0 (82.4)	29.7 (85.5)	33.5 (92.3)	36.8 (98.2)	37.2 (99.0)	31.5 (88.7)	30.6 (87.1)	21.6 (70.9)	17.4 (63.3)	37.2 (99.0)
Mean daily maximum °C (°F)	9.4 (48.9)	10.1 (50.2)	12.0 (53.6)	13.6 (56.5)	16.8 (62.2)	19.5 (67.1)	21.6 (70.9)	22.3 (72.1)	20.0 (68.0)	16.3 (61.3)	12.3 (54.1)	9.7 (49.5)	15.3 (59.5)
Daily mean °C (°F)	6.8 (44.2)	7.2 (45.0)	8.5 (47.3)	9.7 (49.5)	12.8 (55.0)	15.3 (59.5)	17.5 (63.5)	17.6 (63.7)	15.6 (60.1)	12.8 (55.0)	9.3 (48.7)	7.1 (44.8)	11.7 (53.1)
Mean daily minimum °C (°F)	4.2 (39.6)	4.2 (39.6)	5.1 (41.2)	5.9 (42.6)	8.8 (47.8)	11.1 (52.0)	12.9 (55.2)	13.0 (55.4)	11.3 (52.3)	9.3 (48.7)	6.4 (43.5)	4.5 (40.1)	8.1 (46.6)
Record low °C (°F)	−8.5 (16.7)	−6.5 (20.3)	−3.2 (26.2)	−2.8 (27.0)	−0.6 (30.9)	3.2 (37.8)	6.0 (42.8)	5.2 (41.4)	2.2 (36.0)	−3.1 (26.4)	−5.3 (22.5)	−6.7 (19.9)	−8.5 (16.7)
Average precipitation mm (inches)	91.3 (3.59)	86.4 (3.40)	64.0 (2.52)	73.1 (2.88)	59.7 (2.35)	54.0 (2.13)	51.7 (2.04)	45.1 (1.78)	57.1 (2.25)	96.1 (3.78)	101.9 (4.01)	110.6 (4.35)	891.0 (35.08)
Average precipitation days (≥ 1.0 mm)	14.2	13.4	11.8	12.3	9.4	8.0	9.4	8.3	9.5	14.4	15.4	15.0	141.2
Source: Météo France

== Population ==
Population data refer to the commune in its geography as of January 2025.

Historical population
Year	Pop.	±% p.a.
1968	2,556	—
1975	2,409	−0.84%
1982	2,323	−0.52%
1990	2,215	−0.59%
1999	2,328	+0.55%
2007	2,646	+1.61%
2012	2,579	−0.51%
2017	2,688	+0.83%
2023	2,629	−0.37%
Source: INSEE

== See also ==
- Communes of the Côtes-d'Armor department
