= Karin Schlüter =

German equestrian

Medal record

Equestrian

Representing West Germany

Olympic Games
Silver medal – second place	1972 Munich	Team dressage

World Championships
Gold medal – first place	1974 Copenhagen	Team dressage

European Championships
Gold medal – first place	1973 Aachen	Team dressage
Gold medal – first place	1975 Kiev	Team dressage
Bronze medal – third place	1975 Kiev	Individual dressage

Karin Schlüter (born 12 March 1937) is a German equestrian and Olympic medalist. She was born in Hamburg. She competed in dressage at the 1972 Summer Olympics in Munich, and won a silver medal with the German team, along with Liselott Linsenhoff and Josef Neckermann.
