= Violetta Bovt =

American–Soviet ballet dancer (1927–1995

- Виолетта Бовт
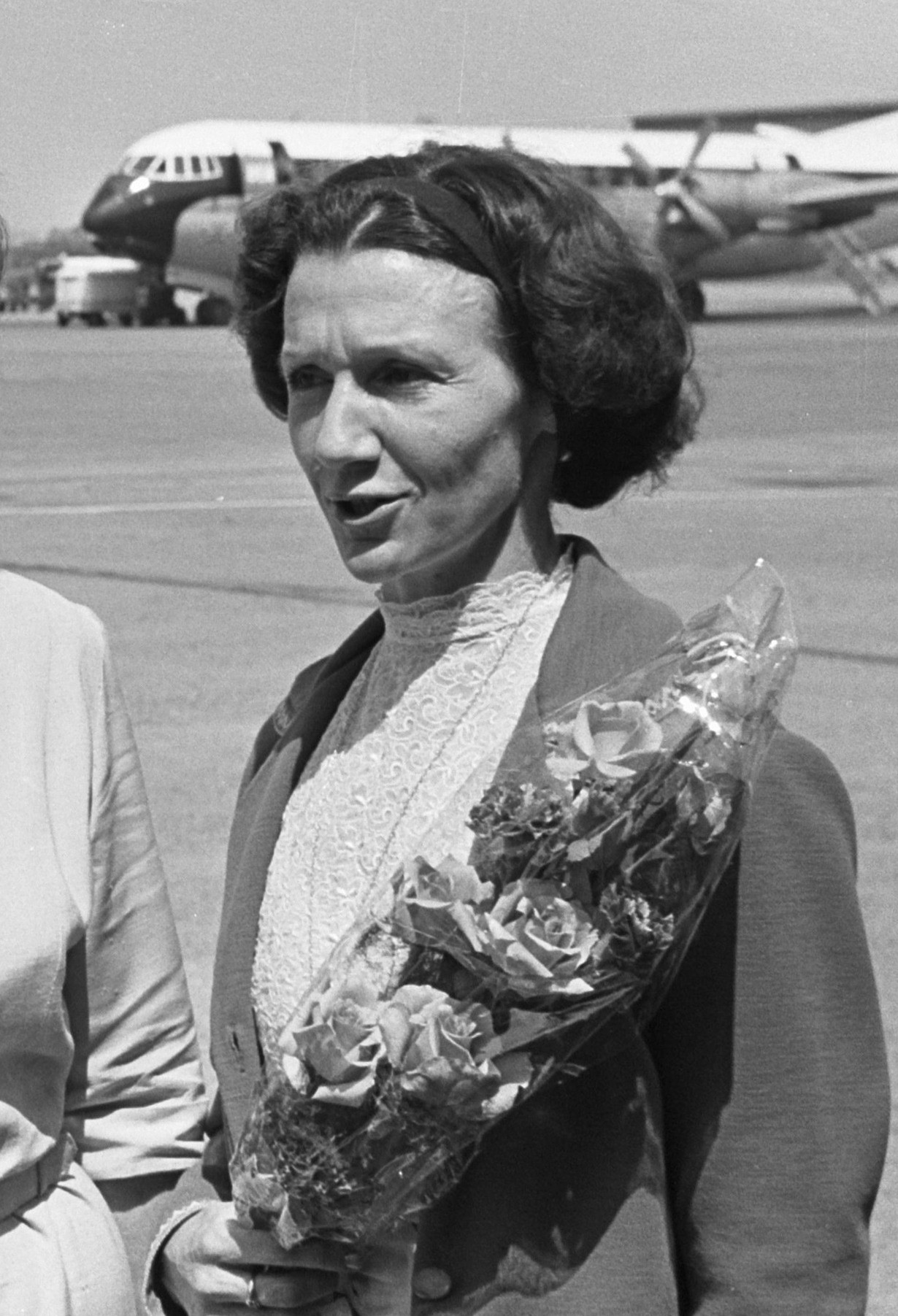
- Bovt in the Netherlands, 1965
- Born: 9 May 1927; Los Angeles, California, U.S.
- Died: 22 April 1995 (aged 67); Columbus, Ohio, U.S.
- Occupation: Ballet dancer

Violetta Trofimovna Bovt (Note: Russian: Виолетта Трофимовна Бовт, romanized: Violetta Trofimovna Bovt, sometimes given as Boft) (9 May 1927 – 22 April 1995) was an American–Soviet ballet dancer.

== Biography ==
Bovt was born in Los Angeles, United States. In the 1930s, her father, a communist sympathizer, moved the family to the Soviet Union; he died in the early 1940s fighting at the World War II front near Leningrad.

In 1944, Bovt graduated from the Bolshoi Ballet Academy and started dancing at the Stanislavski and Nemirovich-Danchenko Theatre. Her roles included:

- Anne Page in The Merry Wives of Windsor by Viktor Oransky (1944)
- Natasha in The Coast of Happiness by Antonio Spadavecchia (1948)
- Esmeralda in La Esmeralda by Cesare Pugni (1950)
- Odette-Odile in Swan Lake by Pyotr Ilyich Tchaikovsky (1953)
- Jeanne d'Arc in Jeanne d'Arc by Nikolay Peyko (1957)
- Lola in Lola by Sergei Vasilenko

Bovt never gave up her American citizenship. For this reason, she was not accepted as a permanent performer with the Bolshoi Ballet and Mariinsky Ballet, despite being a frequent guest star there. She was also not allowed to perform in the United States. She worked at the Stanislavski theatre for 42 years, 35 years as a dancer and 7 as a teacher. A biographical TV film Интервью, которого не было (Interview that never happened) about Bovt was produced in 1968. In 1987, Bovt moved to Columbus, Ohio, where she was hired by BalletMet.
