= Sylvio de Rezende =

Brazilian equestrian

Personal information
- Nationality: Brazilian
- Born: 12 March 1918
- Died: 19 April 1995 (aged 77)

Sport
- Sport: Equestrian

Sylvio de Rezende (12 March 1918 – 19 April 1995) was a Brazilian equestrian. He competed in the individual dressage event at the 1972 Summer Olympics.
