= Günter Stephan (footballer) =

German footballer

Personal information
- Full name: Günter Stephan
- Date of birth: 8 October 1912
- Place of birth: Frankfurt, German Empire
- Date of death: 15 April 1995 (aged 82)
- Place of death: Germany
- Position: Midfielder

Senior career*
Years	Team	Apps	(Gls)
–1934	Schwarz-Weiß Frankfurt		
1934–1943	Schwarz-Weiß Essen		
1943–1944	Eintracht Frankfurt	6	(0)

International career
1935	Germany	1	(0)
- * Club domestic league appearances and goals

Günter Stephan (8 October 1912 – 15 April 1995) was a German footballer who played as a midfielder. He made one appearance for the Germany national team.

== Career ==
Stephan earned his first and only cap for Germany on 18 August 1935 in a friendly against Luxembourg. The match in Luxembourg City finished as a 1–0 win for Germany.

== Personal life ==
Stephan died on 15 April 1995 at the age of 82.

== Career statistics ==
=== International ===
Germany
Year	Apps	Goals
1935	1	0
Total	1	0
