= George Lucas (footballer, born 1901) =

Australian rules footballer

Personal information
- Full name: George Lucas
- Born: 7 January 1901
- Died: 7 April 1995 (aged 94)
- Original team: Sheffield
- Height: 180 cm (5 ft 11 in)
- Weight: 83 kg (183 lb)

Playing career^{1}
Years	Club	Games (Goals)
1924–1928	St Kilda	48 (6)
- ^{1} Playing statistics correct to the end of 1928.

George Lucas (7 January 1901 – 7 April 1995) was an Australian rules footballer who played with St Kilda in the Victorian Football League (VFL).
