= Cécile Lesprit-Poirier =

French diver

Personal information
- Nationality: French
- Born: 2 November 1905; Rambervillers, France
- Died: 3 June 1990 (aged 84); Coutances, France

Sport
- Sport: Diving

Cécile Lesprit-Poirier (2 November 1905 – 3 June 1990) was a French diver. She competed in two events at the 1936 Summer Olympics.
