= Arthur Bryse =

Australian rules footballer, born 1908

Personal information
- Full name: Arthur Percy Bryse
- Born: 13 September 1908; Prahran, Victoria
- Died: 18 June 1990 (aged 81)
- Height: 173 cm (5 ft 8 in)
- Weight: 71 kg (157 lb)

Playing career^{1}
Years	Club	Games (Goals)
1929	Hawthorn	14 (0)
- ^{1} Playing statistics correct to the end of 1929.

Arthur Percy Bryse (13 September 1908 – 18 June 1990) was an Australian rules footballer who played for the Hawthorn Football Club in the Victorian Football League (VFL).
