= Hengoat =

Hengoat Hengoad
- Part of La Roche-Jaudy
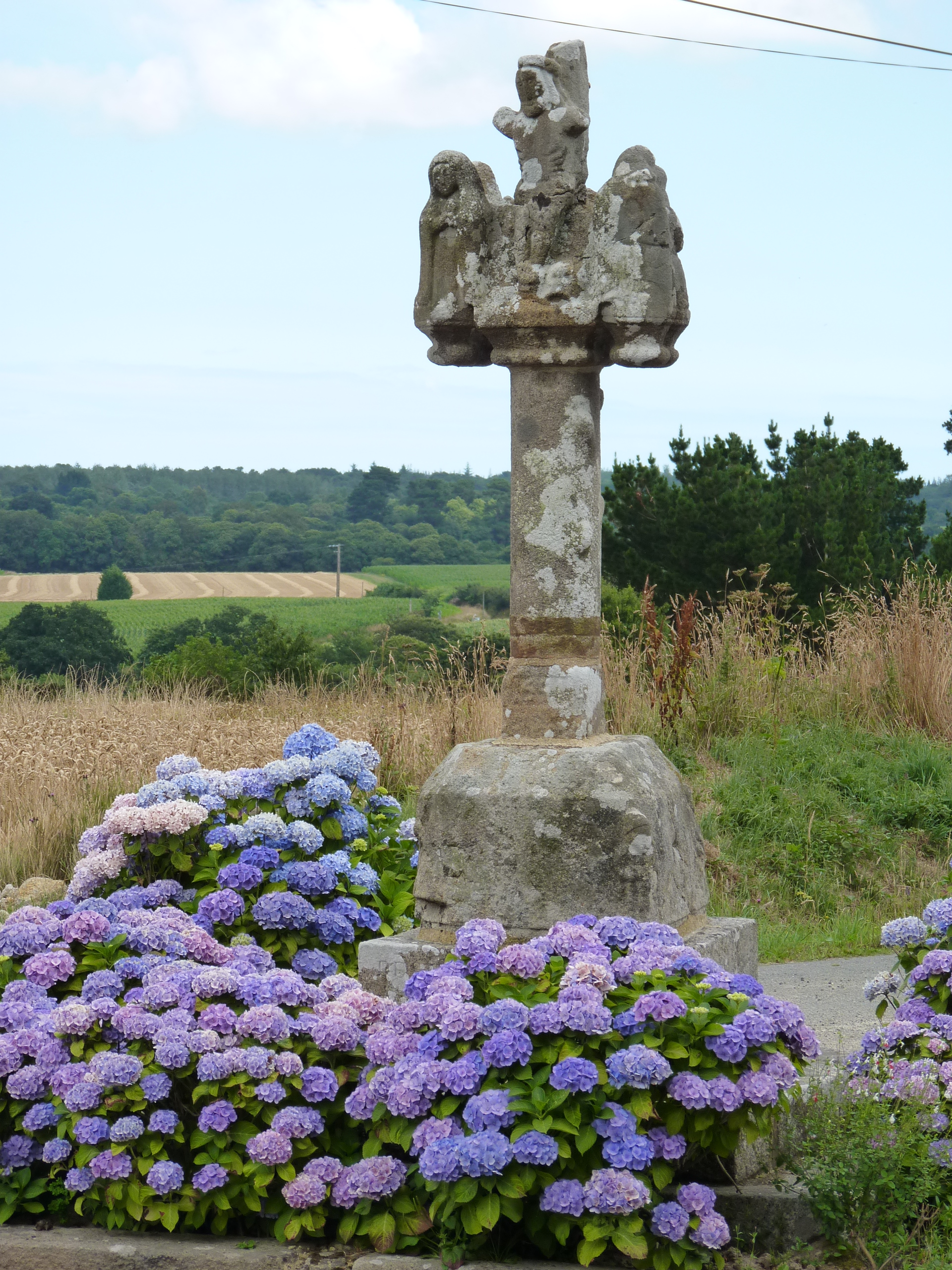
- The calvary of Hengoat

- Coat of arms
- Location of Hengoat
- Location within France Location within Brittany
- Coordinates: 48°44′37″N 3°11′50″W
- Country: France
- Region: Brittany
- Department: Côtes-d'Armor
- Arrondissement: Lannion
- Canton: Tréguier
- Commune: La Roche-Jaudy
- Area^{1}: 6.19 km^{2} (2.39 sq mi)
- Highest elevation: 82 m (269 ft)
- Lowest elevation: 9 m (30 ft)
- Population (2023): 241
  - Density: 38.9/km^{2} (101/sq mi)
- Time zone: UTC+01:00 (CET)
  - Summer (DST): UTC+02:00 (CEST)
- Postal code: 22450
- ^{1} French Land Register data, which excludes lakes, ponds, glaciers > 1 km^{2} (0.386 sq mi or 247 acres) and river estuaries.

Hengoat (French pronunciation: [ɛnɡwat]; Occitan: Hengoad) is a former commune in the Côtes-d'Armor department of Brittany in northwestern France. On 1 January 2019, it was merged into the new commune La Roche-Jaudy. Inhabitants of Hengoat are called hengoatais in French.

== See also ==
- Communes of the Côtes-d'Armor department
