= Gordon Amos =

Australian cricketer

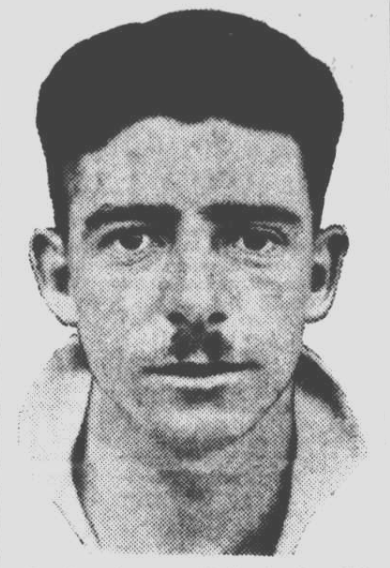

Personal information
- Born: 4 April 1905; Sydney, Australia
- Died: 7 April 1995 (aged 90); Labrador, Queensland, Australia

Domestic team information
- Years: Team
- 1926/27–1931/32: New South Wales
- 1931/32–1936/37: Queensland
- Source: ESPNcricinfo, 22 December 2016

Gordon Amos (4 April 1905 – 7 April 1995) was an Australian cricketer. He played twenty-five first-class matches for New South Wales and Queensland between 1926/27 and 1936/37.

== See also ==
- List of New South Wales representative cricketers
