= Ben Whittam =

Australian rules footballer, born 1909

Personal information
- Full name: Ben Whittam
- Born: 27 August 1909
- Died: 22 April 1995 (aged 85)
- Original team: Alexandra
- Height: 178 cm (5 ft 10 in)
- Weight: 79 kg (174 lb)

Playing career^{1}
Years	Club	Games (Goals)
1931–1933, 1937–1938	North Melbourne	34 (6)
- ^{1} Playing statistics correct to the end of 1938.

Ben Whittam (27 August 1909 – 22 April 1995) was an Australian rules footballer who played for the North Melbourne Football Club in the Victorian Football League (VFL).
