= Sonny Boy Jeffries =

American baseball player (1914–1995)

- Pitcher
- Born: August 5, 1914; Rochester, New York, U.S.
- Died: April 17, 1995 (aged 80); Rochester, New York, U.S.
- Batted: Right Threw: Right

Negro league baseball debut
- 1940, for the Homestead Grays

Last appearance
- 1948, for the Baltimore Elite Giants

Teams
- Homestead Grays (1940); New York Black Yankees (1948)

Nathaniel "Sonny Boy" Jeffries (August 5, 1914 – April 17, 1995) was an American Negro league pitcher in the 1940s.

A native of Rochester, New York, Jeffries made his Negro leagues debut in 1940 for the Homestead Grays, and went on to play for the New York Black Yankees in 1948. He died in Rochester in 1995 at age 80.

Jeffries was a sergeant in the United States Army.
