= Józef Machnik =

Polish footballer

Personal information
- Date of birth: 29 August 1931
- Place of birth: Wadowice, Poland
- Date of death: 15 June 1990 (aged 58)
- Place of death: Mysłowice, Poland
- Height: 1.80 m (5 ft 11 in)
- Position: Goalkeeper

Senior career*
Years	Team	Apps	(Gls)
1950–1952	Wawel Kraków		
1956–1958	Górnik Zabrze		
1959–1966	Zagłębie Sosnowiec		

International career
1956	Poland	2	(0)
- * Club domestic league appearances and goals

Józef Machnik (29 August 1931 – 15 June 1990) was a Polish footballer who played as a goalkeeper. He played in two matches for the Poland national football team in 1956.

== Honours ==
Górnik Zabrze

- Ekstraklasa: 1957
