= Neil Boyd =

Australian rules footballer, born 1915

Personal information
- Full name: Neil Boyd
- Born: 3 June 1915
- Died: 21 June 1990 (aged 75)
- Original team: Preston / Clifton Hill CYMS (CYMSFA)
- Height: 183 cm (6 ft 0 in)
- Weight: 82 kg (181 lb)

Playing career^{1}
Years	Club	Games (Goals)
1938	Fitzroy	4 (0)
- ^{1} Playing statistics correct to the end of 1938.

Neil Boyd (3 June 1915 – 21 June 1990) was an Australian rules footballer who played with Fitzroy in the Victorian Football League (VFL).
