= Marjorie van Vliet =

American aviator (1923–1990)

Marjorie van Vliet (Zeuch) (1923 – 15 June 1990) was a teacher from Warwick, Rhode Island in the United States, who, aged 55, learned to fly and decided to undertake projects to promote world peace and related causes through her flying.

== Touring for peace ==
After founding a "World Friendship Association" and flying some domestic flights to promote world peace and fight child abuse, van Vliet looked for further flying-related challenges. As a more ambitious goal, she decided to fly across the Atlantic Ocean to the Soviet Union to promote world peace, possibly continuing on around the world and returning via the Pacific Ocean. The Cold War, however, was still ongoing and despite many efforts over several years to promote her idea, obtaining permission from the Soviet Union proved insurmountable.

== Planning the Grand Tour of the "Lower 48" ==
The idea was to criss-cross the continental United States (the "Lower 48") in a single two-week period, landing at each state capital to promote her association's messages. A retired USAF colonel, Frank E. Martineau, promoted this campaign and accompanied van Vliet. Martineau was an experienced pilot who had flown bombing missions during World War II and later flew for the U.S. Air Force Reserves. Now aged 69, he had logged 5,400 hours flying time with instrument flying experience. According to periodic newsletters her association published at the time, van Vliet, then 67 years old, believed his experience would significantly enhance her safety during the arduous and ambitious two-week flight.

=== Accident ===
Ultimately, after successfully landing in 47 states, the journey ended in tragedy just one mile short of the penultimate stop. On the morning of June 15, 1990, while executing an instrument approach to Yeager Airport, the single-engine Mooney M-20E that van Vliet and Martineau were flying from Columbus, Ohio to Charleston, West Virginia crashed into wooded terrain in light rain, turbulence and fog. Both perished in the crash.

According to the National Transportation Safety Board report issued in 1992, the probable cause of the crash was:

The pilot's improper IFR procedures, his failure to maintain a proper glide path on the ILS Approach, and his failure to initiate a Missed Approach at the Decision Height. The adverse weather was a related factor.

== Postscript ==
As another irony, the Soviet Union, by now undergoing perestroika, had finally approved van Vliet's request for the World Peace tour flight over their territory (with Martineau as copilot), just prior to the Grand Tour flight.

In 1991, van Vliet was honored by being inducted posthumously into the International Forest of Friendship in Atchison, Kansas.
