= Maurice Fenn =

Fijian cricketer

Personal information
- Full name: Maurice Joseph Fenn
- Born: 5 May 1911; Lau Islands, Fiji
- Died: 11 April 1995 (aged 83); Samoa
- Bowling: Leg break googly

International information
- National side: Fiji

Career statistics
Competition	FC
Matches	9
Runs scored	296
Batting average	19.73
100s/50s	–/–
Top score	44
Balls bowled	2,370
Wickets	50
Bowling average	20.90
5 wickets in innings	4
10 wickets in match	1
Best bowling	6/94
Catches/stumpings	1/–
- Source: Cricinfo, 14 March 2010

Maurice Joseph Fenn (5 May 1911 – 11 April 1995) was a Fijian cricketer. Fenn was a leg break googly bowler.

Fenn made his first-class debut for Fiji in 1948 against Auckland during Fiji's 1947–48 tour of New Zealand, where he played five first-class matches in total. Fenn played a further four first-class matches during Fiji's 1953–54 tour of New Zealand, with his final first-class match for Fiji coming against Auckland.

In his 9 first-class matches for Fiji he scored 296 runs at a batting average of 19.73, with a high score of 44. Widely regarded as the best bowler Fiji has produced, Fenn took 50 wickets at a bowling average of 20.90. He took four five wicket hauls and took ten wickets in a match once, with best innings bowling figures of 6/94 against Auckland in 1948.

Fenn also represented Fiji in 25 non first-class matches from 1948 to 1960, with his final match for Fiji coming against Newcastle during their 1959–60 tour of Australia.

Fenn died on 11 April 1995 in Samoa.
