= Erling Nielsen (philologist) =

Danish philologist (1920–2000)

Erling Frede Nielsen (1920 – 2000) was a Danish philologist.

He worked as a lecturer in Danish language and Danish literature at the University of Oslo from 1950 to 1990. Notable releases include H. C. Andersen og andre danskere (1955) and Navne i dansk litteratur (1970, with Lone Klem). He also edited the series Cappelens nordiske bibliotek, with about thirty titles of Nordic poetry released on Cappelens Forlag in the post-war period, as well as the anthologies Dansk skrivekunst, Norsk skrivekunst and Norske dikt. He was decorated with the Royal Norwegian Order of St. Olav.

For the general audience, he became known when scolding song writer Arne Bendiksen for the song Oj, oj, oj, så glad jeg skal bli, the Norwegian entry in the Eurovision Song Contest 1969. This developed into a heated debate.
