= Gwyn Davies (cricketer) =

Welsh cricketer

Personal information
- Full name: Gwyn Llewelyn Davies
- Born: June 10, 1919; Cathays, Cardiff, Wales
- Died: April 1, 1995 (aged 75); Stockport, Greater Manchester, England
- Batting: Right-handed
- Bowling: Right-arm medium-pace

Gwyn Llewelyn Davies (10 June 1919 – 1 April 1995) was a Welsh cricketer. He was a right-handed batsman and a right-arm medium-pace bowler who played first-class cricket for Glamorgan. He was born in Cathays and died in Stockport.

A regular club cricketer for Cardiff, Davies appeared for Glamorgan Colts and second XI sides prior to the Second World War but his first-class career was disrupted by the war during which he served in the Royal Engineers. He made two appearances for Glamorgan, one each in 1947 and 1948, both times against Lancashire. Between 1948 and 1950 Davies played Minor Counties cricket for the county second XI.

Davies also played rugby, making appearances at full back for Cardiff RFC between 1946 and 1950.
