= Tom Chilvers =

Australian rugby league footballer (1919–1990)

Personal information
- Full name: Thomas William Chilvers
- Born: 3 February 1919; Newtown, New South Wales, Australia
- Died: 16 June 1990 (aged 71); Padstow, New South Wales, Australia

Playing information
- Position: Hooker
Club
| Years | Team | Pld | T | G | FG | P |
|---|---|---|---|---|---|---|
| 1943–44 | Eastern Suburbs | 4 | 0 | 0 | 0 | 0 |
| 1946–47 | St. George | 2 | 0 | 0 | 0 | 0 |
| | Total | 6 | 0 | 0 | 0 | 0 |

Thomas William Chilvers (3 February 1919 – 16 June 1990) was an Australian rugby league footballer who played in the 1940s.

Like many players of his era, Chilvers' rugby league career was interrupted by his Army service in World War II.

In the early 1940s he was playing Reserve Grade with Eastern Suburbs. By 1945, he was stationed in Papua New Guinea with the AIF and survived the conflict.

After returning to Sydney in 1946, he joined the St. George Dragons and played two seasons with them, predominantly in Reserve Grade.

Chilvers died on 16 June 1990 in Padstow, New South Wales aged 71.
