= Chet McNabb =

American basketball player

Personal information
- Born: September 19, 1920 Powell, Missouri, U.S.
- Died: June 14, 1990 (aged 69)
- Listed height: 6 ft 2 in (1.88 m)
- Listed weight: 200 lb (91 kg)

Career information
- College: Arizona State (1939–1942)
- Position: Forward
- Number: 33

Career history

Playing
- 1947: Baltimore Bullets

Coaching
- 1946–1947: Tempe HS

Career highlights
- Second-team All-Border Conference (1942)
- Stats at NBA.com
- Stats at Basketball Reference

Chester Derald McNabb (September 19, 1920 – June 14, 1990) was an American professional basketball player. He played in the Basketball Association of America (BAA) for the Baltimore Bullets in just two games during the 1947–48 season. McNabb's only accumulated career statistics are one personal foul and one field goal attempt.

McNabb also played one season of minor league baseball in 1947. He played for the Phoenix Senators in the Arizona–Texas League.

== BAA career statistics ==
Legend
GP	Games played
FG%	Field-goal percentage
FT%	Free-throw percentage
APG	Assists per game
PPG	Points per game

=== Regular season ===
Year	Team	GP	FG%	FT%	APG	PPG
1947–48	Baltimore	2	.000	.000	.0	.0
Career		2	.000	.000	.0	.0
