= Geoff Farrelly =

Australian rules footballer, born 1908

Personal information
- Full name: Geoffrey Thomas Farrelly
- Born: 9 April 1908; Albury, New South Wales
- Died: 28 June 1990 (aged 82); Cohuna, Victoria
- Original team: Violet Town
- Height: 175 cm (5 ft 9 in)
- Weight: 73 kg (161 lb)

Playing career^{1}
Years	Club	Games (Goals)
1933	Hawthorn	2 (1)
- ^{1} Playing statistics correct to the end of 1933.

Geoffrey Thomas Farrelly (9 April 1908 – 28 June 1990) was an Australian rules footballer who played with Hawthorn in the Victorian Football League (VFL).
