= Norm Duncan =

Australian rules footballer

Personal information
- Full name: Norman Donald Paul Duncan
- Born: 16 December 1922; Carlton, Victoria
- Died: 22 June 1990 (aged 67)
- Height: 191 cm (6 ft 3 in)
- Weight: 89 kg (196 lb)

Playing career^{1}
Years	Club	Games (Goals)
1944, 1946	South Melbourne	19 (15)
- ^{1} Playing statistics correct to the end of 1946.

Norman Donald Paul Duncan (16 December 1922 – 22 June 1990) was an Australian rules footballer who played with South Melbourne in the Victorian Football League (VFL).

He also served in the Royal Australian Air Force during World War II.
