= Donnerhall =

Influential sire in dressage horse breeding

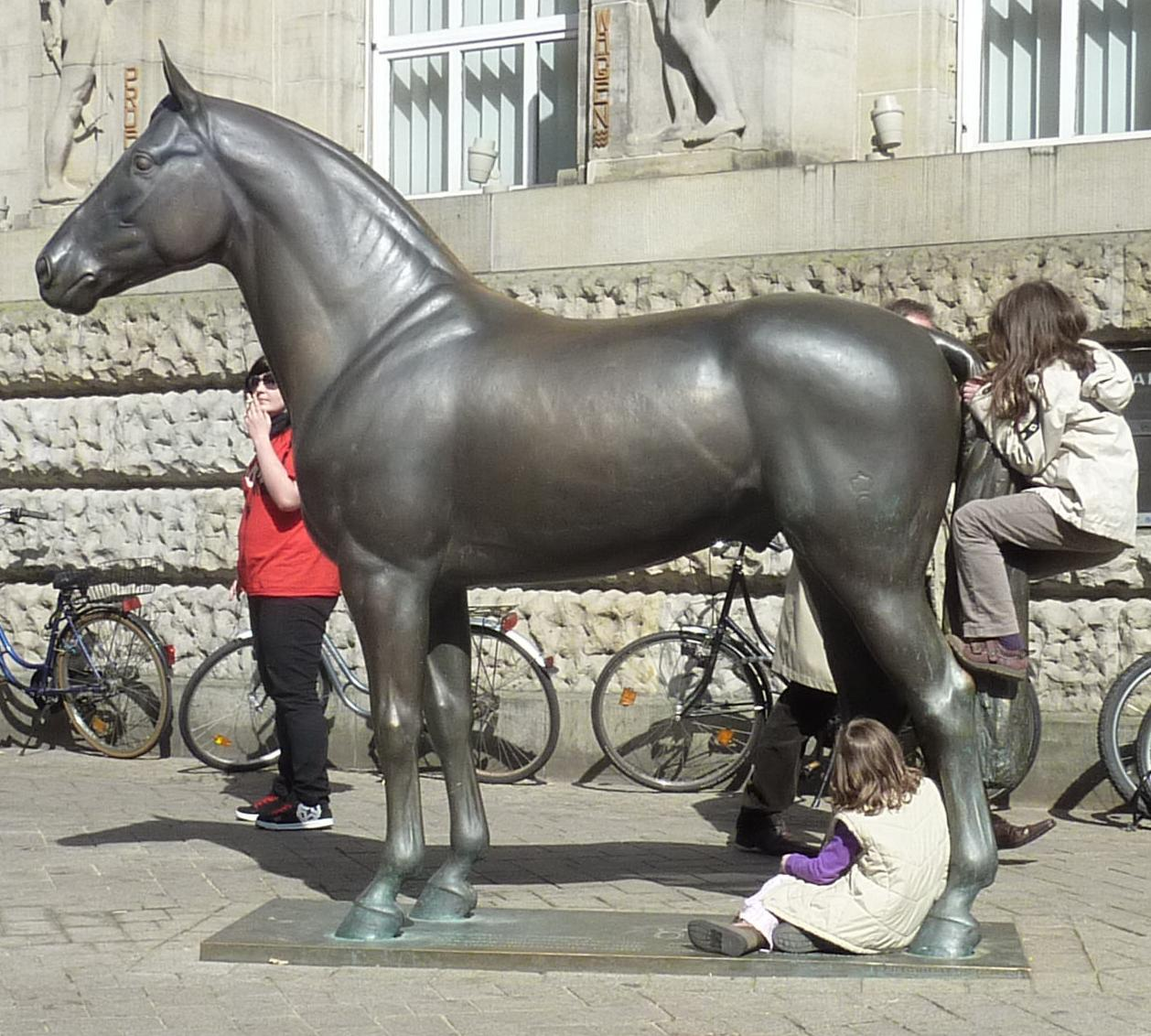
- Donnerhall's bronze statue in Oldenburg
- Breed: Oldenburg
- Sire: Donnerwetter (Hanoverian)
- Grandsire: Disput (Hanoverian)
- Dam: Ninette (Oldenburg)
- Maternal grandsire: Markus (Oldenburg)
- Sex: Stallion
- Foaled: 1981
- Country: Germany
- Colour: Dark Chestnut
- Breeder: Otto Gärtner (sometimes spelled Gaetner)

Donnerhall (May 31, 1981 – January 14, 2002) was a dressage stallion who was known not only for having a successful career as a sport horse, but also passing on his abilities to his offspring to become an influential sire.

== Pedigree ==
Donnerhall was by Donnerwetter, a stallion who stood at Grönwohldhof and competed at Grand Prix level with Herbert and Karin Rehbin before he was sold to the United States in 1990. His other approved sons include Donnerkiel, Dobrock and Don Wienero L.

Donnerhall's dam, Ninette, also produced the mare Noblesse (by Pik Bube I). Ninette was from the Nagate line of mares. Her sire, Markus, was half-Thoroughbred and his sire Manolete xx is also found in the great eventing horse Volturno, winner of 2 Olympic silver medals and a silver medal at the 1978 World Championships in Lexington.

He was approved for Hanoverian, Westphalian, Holstein, Bavarian, Baden-Wurttemberg, Hessen, KWPN, Danish Warmblood studbooks. He stood 16.3 hands (67 inches, 170 cm).

Pedigree of Donnerhall
Sire Donnerwetter blk. 1977 Hanoverian	Disput b. 1967	Diskant b. 1957	Dwinger
Sire Donnerwetter blk. 1977 Hanoverian	Disput b. 1967	Diskant b. 1957	Altpalme
Sire Donnerwetter blk. 1977 Hanoverian	Disput b. 1967	Amselmaerchen ch. 1953	Amselkönig
Sire Donnerwetter blk. 1977 Hanoverian	Disput b. 1967	Amselmaerchen ch. 1953	Berta
Sire Donnerwetter blk. 1977 Hanoverian	Melli b. 1972	Matador blk/br. 1966	Marconi
Sire Donnerwetter blk. 1977 Hanoverian	Melli b. 1972	Matador blk/br. 1966	Landtanne St. Pr
Sire Donnerwetter blk. 1977 Hanoverian	Melli b. 1972	Lilli b. 1965	Der Lowe xx
Sire Donnerwetter blk. 1977 Hanoverian	Melli b. 1972	Lilli b. 1965	Altferne
Dam Ninette blk. 1976 Oldenburg	Markus b. 1963	Manolete xx b. 1955; Thoroughbred	Asterios xx
Dam Ninette blk. 1976 Oldenburg	Markus b. 1963	Manolete xx b. 1955; Thoroughbred	Malta xx
Dam Ninette blk. 1976 Oldenburg	Markus b. 1963	Harine b. 1956	Forscher
Dam Ninette blk. 1976 Oldenburg	Markus b. 1963	Harine b. 1956	Hartherzige V St. Pr
Dam Ninette blk. 1976 Oldenburg	Negola blk. 1966	Carnot ch. 1962	Condor
Dam Ninette blk. 1976 Oldenburg	Negola blk. 1966	Carnot ch. 1962	Schimine
Dam Ninette blk. 1976 Oldenburg	Negola blk. 1966	Negera III blk. 1956	Edler
Dam Ninette blk. 1976 Oldenburg	Negola blk. 1966	Negera III blk. 1956	Negera

== Dressage career ==
Donnerhall
Medal record

Equestrian

World Championships
Gold medal – first place	1994 The Hague	Team dressage
Bronze medal – third place	1994 The Hague	Individual dressage
Gold medal – first place	1998 Rome	Team dressage

European Championships
Gold medal – first place	1997 Verden	Team dressage
Bronze medal – third place	1997 Verden	Individual dressage

Donnerhall began his career in 1984, placing second out of 70 horses at his Stallion Performance Test held in Adelheidsdorf, with a score of 131.92. According to his rider, he was very easy to train, reaching the Grand Prix level of training in 2 years . He was especially known for his expressive passage, piaffe, and extended trot.

Donnerhall had a stellar career as a dressage horse, winning some of the most prestigious competitions, including over 65 FEI Grand Prix Dressage classes and a life earning of D.M. 640,000. He was 1986 German DLG Champion in Hanover, beating out the very athletic Hanoverian stallion World Cup I. In 1994 German Champion (Mannheim), won the team gold and individual bronze at the Dressage World Championship in 1994 and at the European Dressage Championship in 1997 in Verden. In 1997, he also won the World Cup European League. Donnerhall earned his third team gold while finishing 4th individually at the 1998 Dressage World Championship. He was also named Oldenburg Stallion of the Year in 1998.

The stallion then went on a "farewell tour" that same year, retiring from competitive sport at the age of 17. He died January 2002 of acute intestinal toxicopathy.

== Breeding career ==
Donnerhall has the highest dressage breeding value of all stallions at 271, and has produced over 77 approved sons, 450 broodmares (84 State Premium), and over 636 competition horses .

Like his sire, Donnerhall stood at Grönwohldhof. His first few years produced only a few offspring, as the stud was a good distance from the main Oldenburg breeding areas. Within a few years, however, his popularity grew immensely. At the 1998 Federal Championship in Warendorf, more than 50% of the horses had Donnerhall in their pedigree .

Donnerhall passes on his flowing gait, presence, trainability, and excellent temperament.

The 2007 Hanoverian Stallion had Donnerhall offspring 763 winning dressage competitors (84 as show jumpers), with prize money totaling Euro 1,502,302.

Offspring include:

- Don Primero: Champion 5-year old German dressage horse in Verden at the 1990 Bundeschampionate (score of 9.3), now a Grand Prix level dressage horse, siring offspring which sell at 6-figures.
- Don Schufro: exported to Denmark, successful at Grand Prix with Andreas Helgstrand
- Don Frederico: Champion of 1999 Hanovarian stallion licensing and considered second most valuable sport horse stallion with a Breeding Value Index of 174 points.
- Donnerschlag
- Donner bube: located in Wetaskiwin, Alberta, Canada -owner Dr. David Bell and Roxy Bell
- Donnerschwee: sold for DM 220.000, the highest price up to that time paid for a horse at a German Breeding Association auction. Now competes at Grand Prix.
- Dubai: Stallion belonging to the Royal Canadian Mounted Police.
- Primavera: Champion Mare of the Oldenburg elite mare show in 1992, Champion Riding Horse in 1992, and third in the federal championships
- Deutsche Einheit: second in the Federal Championships in Verden in 1992. Sold for what was at that time a record price at the German Breed Societies auctions reaching DM420,000 (£147,000).
- Rastede Schloßpark: 4th place at the German Dressage Horse Championships
- De Niro
- Davignon I: Federal Riding Horse Champion of 1992.
- Hallo: won the elite mare show in Rastede in 1994.
- Duntroon: vice-champion stallion of the Oldenburg approvals in 1993; won the stallion performance test in Adelheidsdorf in 1994.
- High Noon 15: top dressage mare, full sister to Hallo.
- Donatello: Germany’s highest priced auction horse at the time he was sold (1996).
- Deinhard: sold to The Netherlands for DM 155,000 (£54,500) at the Vechta foal auction in 1998, a record price for a foal.
