= Ivor Aldridge =

Australian rules footballer

Personal information
- Full name: Henry Ivor Aldridge
- Born: 13 November 1899; Clifton Hill, Victoria
- Died: 2 June 1990 (aged 90); Glen Iris, Victoria
- Original team: South Melbourne Districts
- Height: 178 cm (5 ft 10 in)
- Weight: 72 kg (159 lb)

Playing career^{1}
Years	Club	Games (Goals)
1920–21	St Kilda	8 (2)
- ^{1} Playing statistics correct to the end of 1921.

Henry Ivor Aldridge (13 November 1899 – 2 June 1990) was an Australian rules footballer who played with St Kilda in the Victorian Football League (VFL).
