= Hermann Dür =

Swiss equestrian

Personal information
- Nationality: Swiss
- Born: 23 June 1925
- Died: 25 August 2015 (aged 90)

Sport
- Sport: Equestrian
Medal record
Equestrian
Representing Switzerland
World Championships
| Bronze medal – third place | 1974 Copenhagen | Team dressage |
European Championships
| Bronze medal – third place | 1973 Aachen | Team dressage |

Hermann Dür (23 June 1925 – 25 August 2015) was a Swiss equestrian. He competed in two events at the 1972 Summer Olympics.
