= Julio Herrera (equestrian) =

Mexican equestrian

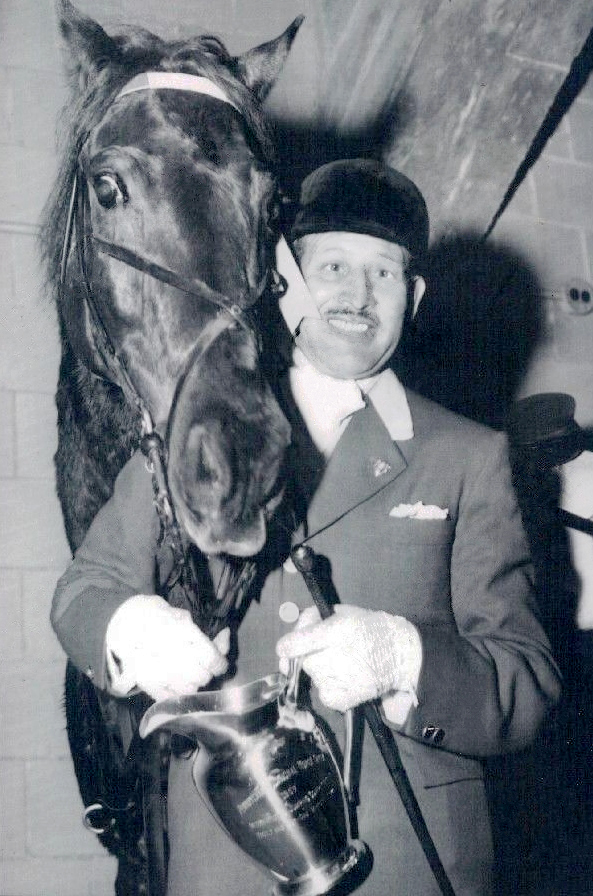
- Herrera in 1957

Personal information
- Born: 16 March 1911 Mexico City, Mexico
- Height: 170 cm (5 ft 7 in)
- Weight: 68 kg (150 lb)

Sport
- Sport: Horse riding
- Event: Dressage

Julio Herrera (March 16, 1911 – ?) was a Mexican equestrian. He finished last in the individual mixed dressage at the 1968 Summer Olympics.
