= Erling Nielsen (field hockey) =

Danish field hockey player

Personal information
- Nationality: Danish
- Born: 1 May 1922 Kalundborg, Denmark
- Died: 1 April 1995 (aged 72) Kalundborg, Denmark

Sport
- Sport: Field hockey

Erling Nielsen (1 May 1922 – 1 April 1995) was a Danish field hockey player. He competed at the 1948 Summer Olympics and the 1960 Summer Olympics.
