= Cees Benedictus-Lieftinck =

Dutch equestrian

Personal information
- Nationality: Dutch
- Born: 16 June 1920 Groningen, Netherlands
- Died: 25 February 2008 (aged 87) Harderwijk, Netherlands

Sport
- Sport: Equestrian

Cees Benedictus-Lieftinck (16 June 1920 – 25 February 2008) was a Dutch equestrian. She competed in two events at the 1972 Summer Olympics.
