= Aksel Malling Mikkelsen =

Danish equestrian (born 1948)

Personal information
- Nationality: Danish
- Born: 15 June 1948 (age 77) Gentofte, Denmark

Sport
- Sport: Equestrian

Aksel Malling Mikkelsen (born 15 June 1948) is a Danish equestrian. He competed in two events at the 1972 Summer Olympics.
