= Yelena Petushkova =

Russian equestrian

- Petushkova in competition

Medal record

Equestrian

Representing the Soviet Union

Olympic Games
Gold medal – first place	1972 Munich	Team dressage
Silver medal – second place	1968 Mexico City	Team dressage
Silver medal – second place	1972 Munich	Individual dressage

World Championships
Gold medal – first place	1970 Aachen	Individual dressage
Gold medal – first place	1970 Aachen	Team dressage
Silver medal – second place	1974 Copenhagen	Team dressage
Bronze medal – third place	1966 Bern	Team dressage
Bronze medal – third place	1974 Copenhagen	Individual dressage
Bronze medal – third place	1978 Goodwood	Team dressage

European Championships
Silver medal – second place	1967 Aachen	Team dressage
Silver medal – second place	1971 Wolfsburg	Team dressage
Silver medal – second place	1973 Aachen	Individual dressage
Silver medal – second place	1973 Wolfsburg	Team dressage
Silver medal – second place	1975 Kiev	Team dressage
Silver medal – second place	1979 Aarhus	Team dressage
Bronze medal – third place	1965 Copenhagen	Team dressage
Bronze medal – third place	1969 Wolfsburg	Team dressage
Bronze medal – third place	1985 Copenhagen	Team dressage

Yelena Vladimirovna Petushkova (Russian: Елена Владимировна Петушкова; 17 November 1940 – 8 January 2007) was a Soviet and Russian equestrian who won three medals, of which one was gold and two silver in dressage during the Summer Olympics.

== Biography ==
Petushkova became a member of the USSR National Team in 1964 and competed for it until 1987. In the 1968 Summer Olympics she won her first silver medal, finishing in second place in the team dressage event alongside Ivan Kalita and Ivan Kizimov. Four years later, in the 1972 Summer Olympics she and her teammates who were again Kalita and Kizimov improved their performance and won the gold medal. In the individual competition she won her third Olympic medal, finishing second behind Liselott Linsenhoff. In between she became World Champion in Aachen 1970 riding her horse Pepel. She became national champion of the Soviet Union a total of thirteen times.

After her career she became vice president of the Soviet Union Olympic Committee between 1983 and 1991, while she was president of the Russian Equestrian Federation from 1996 to 1999 and was the head coach of the Russian National Dressage Team since 1997.

Along with her sports achievements Petushkova also had a highly successful scientific career. After graduating from a secondary school with the gold medal in 1957 she entered the Department of Biology of Moscow State University. She graduated from there with honors in 1963 and after studying in the aspirantura of the Scientific Research Institute of Pharmacology and Medicine by the USSR Academy of Medical Sciences for two years, received Candidate of Biology Sciences scientific degree. Between 1966 and 1976 she was a junior research worker and between 1976 and 1991 - a senior research worker at the chair of biochemistry of the Department of Biology of Moscow State University. In 1991 Petushkova became a senior research worker at the Institute of Biochemistry of the Russian Academy of Sciences, working there until 1997. She authored more than 60 publications in Soviet and international journals of biochemistry and wrote a monograph "An Introduction to the Kinetics of Enzymic Reactions" in 1982.

Petushkova was awarded the Order of the Red Banner of Labour in 1970, the Order of the Badge of Honour in 1972 and the Order of Friendship of Peoples in 1980.

At the age of 66 she died from a brain tumor.
