= Steve Stevens (footballer) =

Australian rules footballer

Personal information
- Full name: Stephen Roy Stevens
- Born: 5 February 1903; Bendigo
- Died: 22 June 1990 (aged 87)

Playing career^{1}
Years	Club	Games (Goals)
1920	St Kilda	1 (0)
- ^{1} Playing statistics correct to the end of 1920.

Stephen Roy Stevens (5 February 1903 – 22 June 1990) was an Australian rules footballer who played with St Kilda in the Victorian Football League (VFL).
