= Lois Stephens =

American equestrian (1923–2018)

Lois Stephens (March 27, 1923 – 2018) was an American equestrian who competed in the 1972 Summer Olympics.
