= Patricio Escudero =

Chilean equestrian

Personal information
- Born: 16 March 1935 (age 91) Santiago, Chile

Sport
- Sport: Equestrian
Medal record
Equestrian
Representing Chile
Pan American Games
Gold medal – first place	1967 Winnipeg	Team dressage
Silver medal – second place	1967 Winnipeg	Individual dressage

Patricio Escudero (born 16 March 1935) is a Chilean equestrian. He competed in two events at the 1968 Summer Olympics.
