= Ulla Petersen =

Danish equestrian (1933–2005)

Personal information
- Nationality: Danish
- Born: 27 May 1933 Aalborg, Denmark
- Died: 29 April 2005 (aged 71)

Sport
- Sport: Equestrian

Ulla Petersen (27 May 1933 – 29 April 2005) was a Danish equestrian. She competed at the 1972 Summer Olympics and the 1976 Summer Olympics. She died on 29 April 2025, at the age of 71.
