= Marita Aeschbacher =

Swiss equestrian (born 1941)

Personal information
- Born: 7 May 1941 (age 85)
- Height: 1.73 m (5 ft 8 in)
- Weight: 64 kg (141 lb)

Sport
- Sport: Equestrian
Medal record
Equestrian
Representing Switzerland
European Championships
Bronze medal – third place	1973 Aachen	Team dressage

Marita Aeschbacher (born 7 May 1941) is a Swiss equestrian. She competed in the 1972 Summer Olympics.
