= Ninna Swaab =

Swedish equestrian

Personal information
- Nationality: Swedish
- Born: 26 June 1940 (age 86) Copenhagen, Denmark

Sport
- Sport: Equestrian
Medal record
Equestrian
Representing Sweden
Olympic Games
Bronze medal – third place	1972 Munich	Team dressage

Ninna Swaab (born 26 June 1940) is a Swedish equestrian and Olympic medalist. She won a bronze medal in dressage at the 1972 Summer Olympics in Munich.
