= Charlotte Ingemann =

Danish equestrian

Personal information
- Nationality: Danish
- Born: 3 September 1946 (age 78); Gentofte, Denmark

Sport
- Sport: Equestrian

Charlotte Ingemann (born 3 September 1946) is a Danish equestrian. She competed in two events at the 1972 Summer Olympics.
