= Maud von Rosen =

Swedish equestrian

Personal information
- Nationality: Swedish
- Born: 24 December 1925 (age 100)

Sport
- Sport: Equestrian
Medal record
Equestrian
Representing Sweden
Olympic Games
Bronze medal – third place	1972 Munich	Team dressage
European Championships
Bronze medal – third place	1971 Wolfsburg	Team dressage

Maud von Rosen (born 24 December 1925) is a Swedish equestrian and Olympic medalist. She won a bronze medal in dressage at the 1972 Summer Olympics in Munich.
