= Anny van Doorne =

Dutch equestrian

Personal information
- Nationality: Dutch
- Born: 26 February 1930; Eindhoven, Netherlands
- Died: 6 April 2004 (aged 74); Neerpelt, Belgium

Sport
- Sport: Equestrian

Anny van Doorne (26 February 1930 – 6 April 2004) was a Dutch equestrian. She competed in two events at the 1972 Summer Olympics.
