= Guillermo Squella =

Chilean equestrian

Personal information
- Born: 18 March 1923 Santiago, Chile
- Died: 11 December 2010 (aged 87) Bogotá, Colombia

Sport
- Sport: Equestrian
Medal record
Equestrian
Representing Chile
Pan American Games
Gold medal – first place	1967 Winnipeg	Team dressage
Silver medal – second place	1951 Buenos Aires	Team eventing
Bronze medal – third place	1967 Winnipeg	Individual dressage

Guillermo Squella (18 March 1923 – 11 December 2010) was a Chilean equestrian. He competed in two events at the 1968 Summer Olympics.
