= Zoltan Sztehlo =

Hungarian equestrian

Personal information
- Nationality: Hungarian-Canadian
- Born: 27 November 1921; Budapest, Hungary
- Died: 16 June 1990 (aged 68); Guatemala City, Guatemala

Sport
- Sport: Equestrian

Zoltan Sztehlo (27 November 1921 – 16 June 1990) was a Hungarian-Canadian equestrian. He competed at the 1968 Summer Olympics.
