= Ivan Kalita (equestrian) =

Soviet equestrian

Medal record

Equestrian

Representing Soviet Union

Olympic Games
Gold medal – first place	1972 Munich	Team dressage
Silver medal – second place	1968 Mexico City	Team dressage
Bronze medal – third place	1964 Tokyo	Team dressage

World Championships
Gold medal – first place	1970 Aachen	Team dressage
Silver medal – second place	1974 Copenhagen	Team dressage

European Championships
Silver medal – second place	1971 Wolfsburg	Team dressage
Silver medal – second place	1973 Aachen	Team dressage
Silver medal – second place	1975 Kiev	Team dressage
Bronze medal – third place	1965 Copenhagen	Team dressage
Bronze medal – third place	1969 Wolfsburg	Team dressage
Bronze medal – third place	1973 Aachen	Individual dressage

Ivan Aleksandrovich Kalita (Russian: Иван Александрович Калита; 14 January 1927 – 29 March 1996) was a Soviet equestrian and Olympic champion. He won a gold medal in team dressage at the 1972 Summer Olympics in Munich. Kalita was the oldest Olympic participant from USSR (49 years and 197 days during 1976 Summer Olympics in Montreal).

== Biography ==
From December 1944 he served as a horse breeder in the cavalry school of equestrian instructors .

Ivan Kalita took part in five consecutive Summer Olympics (1960, 1964, 1968, 1972, 1976), taking part in the individual and team dressage championships. His trainers were Grigory Anastasiev and Nikolay Sitko.

He made his debut at the Olympic Games in 1960 in Rome at the age of 33, finished fifth in the individual championship.

He graduated from the Frunze Military Academy (1961). He played for CSKA. Member of the CPSU since 1952.

Four years later, in Tokyo, Kalita was 15th in the individual championship, and as part of the USSR national team, he won bronze in the team championship at the Moara (together with Sergei Filatov and Ivan Kizimov).

In 1968, in Mexico City, Kalita was 4th in the individual championship (gold was won by Ivan Kizimov). As part of the USSR national team, Kalita won silver in the team championship at Absinthe (together with Ivan Kizimov and Yelena Petushkova).

In 1972, in Munich, Kalita on Tarifa became the 5th in the individual championship, and as part of the USSR national team he became the Olympic champion in team dressage. This was the first victory of Soviet athletes in team competitions in all types of equestrian sports at the Olympic Games. At the time of his victory in Munich, Kalita was already over 45 years old, which made him one of the oldest Olympic champions in the history of the USSR.

Four years later, in Montreal, Kalita performed for the last time at the Olympics and became the 13th in the individual championship, and as part of the USSR national team he took 4th place in the team championship. At the time of his last performance in Montreal, Kalita was 49 years and 197 days, making him the oldest participant in the Olympic Games in all sports in the history of the USSR.

Even during his sports career, Ivan Alexandrovich became a coach. Since 1978 he coached the USSR national team. At the 1992 Games in Barcelona, Kalita was the coach of the United Dressage Team .

He died on March 29, 1996, and was buried at the 42nd section of the Khimki cemetery.
