= Horst Köhler (equestrian) =

German equestrian

Personal information
- Nationality: German
- Born: 14 November 1938 (age 87) Röbel, Germany

Sport
- Sport: Equestrian
Medal record
Equestrian
Representing East Germany
World Championships
Bronze medal – third place	1970 Aachen	Team dressage
European Championships
Silver medal – second place	1969 Wolfsburg	Team dressage

Horst Köhler (born 14 November 1938) is a German equestrian. He competed at the 1968 Summer Olympics and the 1972 Summer Olympics.
