= Christilot Hanson-Boylen =

Canadian equestrian (born 1947)

Medal record

Equestrian

Representing Canada

Pan American Games
Gold medal – first place	1971 Cali	Individual dressage
Gold medal – first place	1971 Cali	Team dressage
Gold medal – first place	1975 Mexico City	Individual dressage
Gold medal – first place	1987 Indianapolis	Individual dressage
Gold medal – first place	1987 Indianapolis	Team dressage
Silver medal – second place	1975 Mexico City	Team dressage
Bronze medal – third place	1967 Winnipeg	Team dressage

Christilot Hanson-Boylen (born 12 April 1947 in Jakarta, Indonesia) is a Canadian equestrian who competed as a member of the Canadian Equestrian Team in Dressage at six Olympic Games (1964, 1968, 1972, 1976, 1984, and 1992).

Boylen's mother was the late Javanese-born Canadian dancer, Willy Blok Hanson, and her father was an Australian soldier. Her mother was of Chinese, Dutch, French, and Indonesian descent. Born in present-day Indonesia in 1947, she moved with her family to Toronto, Ontario, Canada, in 1951. Her parents divorced in the early 1970s.

She earned individual gold medals at the 1971, 1975 and 1987 Pan American Games, making her the only athlete to achieve three individual gold medals in Pan Am history. In addition, she has been a Canadian National Dressage Champion seven times.

At the Summer Olympics, her best performance was in 1976, when she came seventh in the individual competition and fifth in the team event. She was also the highest placed North American rider at the 1984 Olympics in the individual dressage when she came tenth.

She now lives in Germany. She has written two books and produced a video about dressage and is one of the founders of the non-profit Canadian Dressage Owners and Riders Association (CADORA).

Boylen retired from international team competition in July 2020.

== See also ==
- List of athletes with the most appearances at Olympic Games
