= Domini Lawrence =

British equestrian (1925–2025)

Personal information
- Nationality: British
- Born: Domini Margaret Lawrence; 8 May 1925 London, England
- Died: 4 January 2025 (aged 99)

Sport
- Sport: Equestrian

Domini Margaret Morgan (née Lawrence; 8 May 1925 – 4 January 2025) was a British equestrian.

== Biography ==
Lawrence was born in Marylebone, London, on 8 May 1925, to Lydia (née Ivett) and Alfred Clive Lawrence, a barrister who had been appointed Commander of the Order of the British Empire in 1918.

Lawrence competed at the 1968 Summer Olympics and the 1972 Summer Olympics.

In 1968, in the Mexico City games, Lawrence came fifth with the British dressage team and 11th individually. In 1972, in Munich, she came 10th in the team and 33rd individually.

Lawrence later became a judge with the International Federation for Equestrian Sports and continued working until her 1998 retirement. She died on 4 January 2025, at the age of 99. At the time of her death, she was Great Britain's oldest surviving Olympian.
