= Lorna Johnstone =

British equestrian (1902–1990)

Hilda Lorna Johnstone MBE

Personal information
- Nationality: British
- Discipline: Dressage
- Born: 4 September 1902; York, England
- Died: 18 May 1990 (aged 87)

Hilda Lorna Johnstone MBE (4 September 1902 – 18 May 1990) was an Olympic equestrian specialising in dressage who represented Great Britain in three Summer Olympic Games. She was born in York.

She participated in the 1956, 1968 and 1972 Olympic Games. In the last event, aged 70, she became the oldest ever British competitor and oldest ever woman to take part in the Olympic Games. Her best finish was 5th place in the 1968 Mixed Dressage Team event.
