= Wolfgang Müller (equestrian) =

German equestrian (1931–2021)

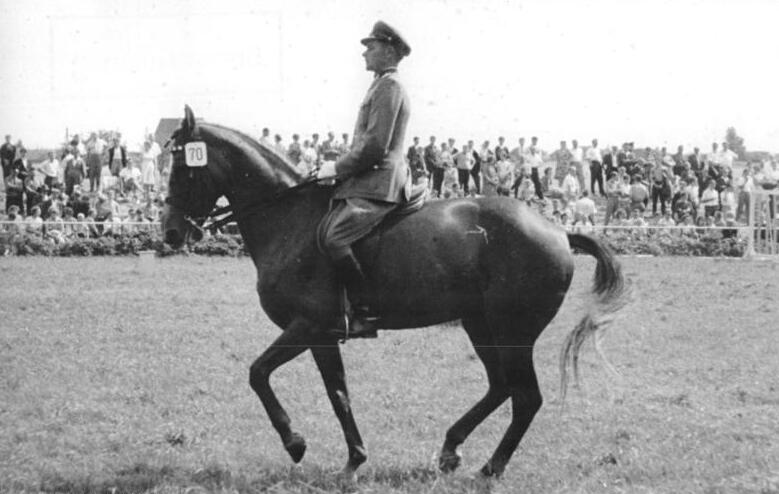
- Müller in 1963

Personal information
- Nationality: German
- Born: 6 October 1931 Landsberg an der Warthe, Brandenburg, Prussia, Germany (today Gorzów Wielkopolski, Poland)
- Died: 30 December 2021 (aged 90) Löbnitz, Germany

Sport
- Sport: Equestrian
Medal record
Equestrian
Representing East Germany
World Championships
Bronze medal – third place	1970 Aachen	Team dressage
European Championships
Silver medal – second place	1969 Wolfsburg	Team dressage

Wolfgang Müller (6 October 1931 – 30 December 2021) was a German equestrian. He competed at the 1968 Summer Olympics and the 1972 Summer Olympics. Müller died on 30 December 2021, at the age of 90.
