= Liselott Linsenhoff =

German equestrian

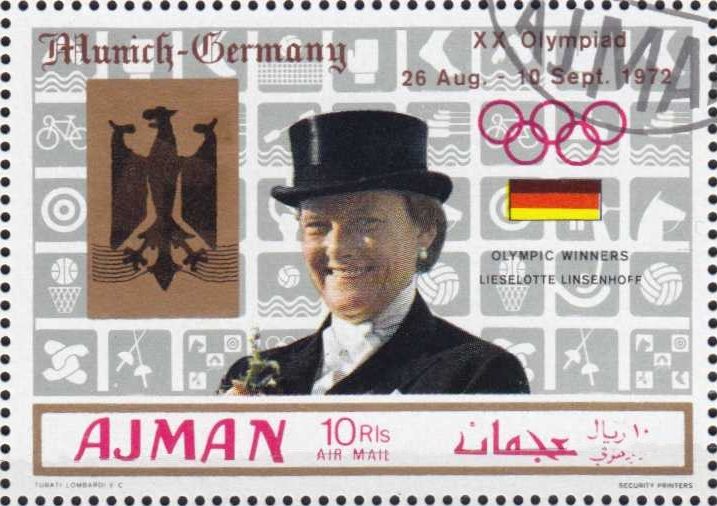

Personal information
- Born: 25 August 1927 Frankfurt am Main, Weimar Republic
- Died: 4 August 1999 (aged 71) Juan-les-Pins, France
- Height: 1.78 m (5 ft 10 in)
- Weight: 65 kg (143 lb)

Sport
- Sport: Equestrian
- Club: FRFC, Frankfurt am Main
Medal record
Representing Germany
Olympic Games
Silver medal – second place	1956 Stockholm	Team dressage
Bronze medal – third place	1956 Stockholm	Individual dressage
Representing West Germany
Olympic Games
Gold medal – first place	1968 Mexico City	Team dressage
Gold medal – first place	1972 Munich	Individual dressage
Silver medal – second place	1972 Munich	Team dressage
World championships
Gold medal – first place	1974 Copenhagen	Team dressage
Silver medal – second place	1970 Aachen	Individual dressage
Silver medal – second place	1970 Aachen	Team dressage
Silver medal – second place	1974 Copenhagen	Individual dressage
European championships
Gold medal – first place	1969 Wolfsburg	Individual dressage
Gold medal – first place	1969 Wolfsburg	Team dressage
Gold medal – first place	1971 Wolfsburg	Individual dressage
Gold medal – first place	1971 Wolfsburg	Team dressage
Gold medal – first place	1973 Aachen	Team dressage

Liselott Linsenhoff (25 August 1927 – 4 August 1999) was a German equestrian and Olympic champion. Competing in the mixed dressage on the famous Swedish stallion Piaff, she won a gold medal at the 1968 Summer Olympics with the West German team, and an individual gold medal at the 1972 Summer Olympics, becoming the first woman gold medalist in this event.

At the world championships, Linsenhoff was a member of the winning dressage team in 1974 and finished second individually in 1970 and third individually in Copenhagen in 1974. In addition, she won two individual (1969 and 1971) and one team European title (1973). Her daughter, Ann-Kathrin, was also an Olympic champion in equestrian sport.

Liselott was the daughter of Albert Schindling, the owner of the racing stable Asta. She lived in Taunus and was one of the most prominent German dressage riders, along with Josef Neckermann. In 1975, her family moved to Switzerland, which resulted in a conflict with the German tax authorities, and retirement of Linsenhoff from sport shortly before the 1976 Olympics.
