= Josef Neckermann =

German equestrian

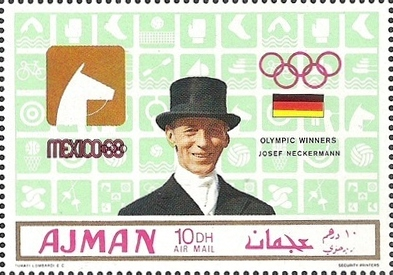

Personal information
- Born: Josef Carl Peter Neckermann; 5 June 1912 Würzburg, Kingdom of Bavaria, German Empire
- Died: 13 January 1992 (aged 79) Dreieich, Germany
- Height: 1.83 m (6 ft 0 in)
- Weight: 65 kg (143 lb)

Sport
- Sport: Equestrian
- Club: RV Gravenbruch, Neu-Isenburg
Medal record
Equestrian
Representing Germany
Olympic Games
Gold medal – first place	1964 Tokyo	Team dressage
Bronze medal – third place	1960 Rome	Individual dressage
Representing West Germany
Olympic Games
Gold medal – first place	1968 Mexico City	Team dressage
Silver medal – second place	1968 Mexico City	Individual dressage
Silver medal – second place	1972 Munich	Team dressage
Bronze medal – third place	1972 Munich	Individual dressage
World Championships
Gold medal – first place	1966 Bern	Individual dressage
Gold medal – first place	1966 Bern	Team dressage
Silver medal – second place	1970 Aachen	Team dressage
European Championships
Gold medal – first place	1965 Copenhagen	Team dressage
Gold medal – first place	1967 Aachen	Team dressage
Gold medal – first place	1969 Wolfsburg	Team dressage
Gold medal – first place	1971 Wolfsburg	Team dressage
Silver medal – second place	1971 Wolfsburg	Individual dressage
Bronze medal – third place	1969 Wolfsburg	Individual dressage

Josef Carl Peter Neckermann (5 June 1912 – 13 January 1992) was a German equestrian and Olympic champion. He won Olympic medals at four different Olympics, in 1960, 1964, 1968 and 1972. Later Neckermann became a member of the West German National Olympic Committee.

He was also the founder and owner of the German mail order company Neckermann AG in 1938.

== Biography ==
He benefited greatly from the Nazi forced hostile takeover of Jewish businesses, including the 1938 acquisition of Karl Amson Joel's retail business in Berlin.

For that, shortly after World War II, Neckermann was sentenced to one year in a military prison.

In 1957, Joel got a compensation of 2 million West German marks for his former company from Neckermann who ran the most successful German mail order selling company at the time.

== Family ==
Neckermann's daughter Eva Maria Pracht and granddaughter Martina Pracht were also Olympic equestrians.
