= Ivan Kizimov =

Soviet Russian equestrian (1928–2019)

Personal information
- Nationality: Russian
- Born: 28 May 1928 Novocherkassk, Russian SFSR, Soviet Union
- Died: 22 September 2019 (aged 91)

Sport
- Sport: Equestrian
Medal record
Equestrian
Representing the Soviet Union
Olympic Games
Gold medal – first place	1968 Mexico City	Individual dressage
Gold medal – first place	1972 Munich	Team dressage
Silver medal – second place	1968 Mexico City	Team dressage
Bronze medal – third place	1964 Tokyo	Team dressage
World Championships
Gold medal – first place	1970 Aachen	Team dressage
Silver medal – second place	1974 Copenhagen	Team dressage
Bronze medal – third place	1966 Bern	Team dressage
Bronze medal – third place	1970 Aachen	Individual dressage
European Championships
Silver medal – second place	1967 Aachen	Individual dressage
Silver medal – second place	1967 Aachen	Team dressage
Silver medal – second place	1969 Wolfsburg	Individual dressage
Silver medal – second place	1971 Wolfsburg	Team dressage
Silver medal – second place	1973 Aachen	Team dressage
Bronze medal – third place	1965 Copenhagen	Team dressage
Bronze medal – third place	1969 Wolfsburg	Team dressage
Bronze medal – third place	1971 Wolfsburg	Individual dressage

Ivan Kizimov (Russian: Иван Михайлович Кизимов; 28 May 1928 – 22 September 2019) was a Soviet and Russian equestrian and Olympic champion. He was born in Novocherkassk. He won an individual gold medal in dressage at the 1968 Summer Olympics in Mexico City, and a gold medal in team dressage at the 1972 Summer Olympics in Munich. He won a bronze medal in individual dressage at the 1970 Dressage World Championship, and team medals in 1966 (bronze), 1970 (gold) and 1974 (silver). He also won eight medals in total at the European Dressage Championships, five silver and three bronze medals.
