= Equestrian at the 1996 Summer Olympics – Individual dressage =

Equestrian at the Olympics

Individual dressage at the Games of the XXVI Olympiad
- Venue: Georgia International Horse Park
- Date: 26 July & 27 July 1996 (Grand Prix); 31 July 1996 (Grand Prix Special); 3 August 1996 (Grand Prix Freestyle)
- Competitors: 49 from 18 nations

Medalists
1st place, gold medalist(s)		Isabell Werth	Germany
2nd place, silver medalist(s)		Anky van Grunsven	Netherlands
3rd place, bronze medalist(s)		Sven Rothenberger	Netherlands

The individual dressage event, part of the equestrian program at the 1996 Summer Olympics, was held from 26 July to 3 August 1996, at the Georgia International Horse Park, in Conyers, Georgia. Like all other equestrian events, the dressage competition was mixed gender, with both male and female athletes competing in the same division. 48 horse and rider pairs were entered, with round one scores from team event.

== Medalists ==
Gold		Silver		Bronze	
Germany		Netherlands		Netherlands	
Isabell Werth	Gigolo	Anky van Grunsven	Bonfire	Sven Rothenberger	Weyden

== Results ==
=== Grand Prix Test ===
Top 25 riders advanced to round two. Held 26 and 27 July. The first round was the Grand Prix Test. Each of the 48 pairs went through a series of movements in the sandy arena, with judges in five different positions observing the movements and giving percentage scores based on the execution of the movements. The total score for the round was the average of the five judges' scores. The top 25 pairs advanced to the second round.

Rank	Rider	Horse	Nation	Total Points	% Score	Qual
1	Isabell Werth	Gigolo	Germany	1915	76.60	Q
2	Anky van Grunsven	Bonfire	Netherlands	1893	75.72	Q
3	Michelle Gibson	Peron	United States	1880	75.20	Q
4	Sven Rothenberger	Weyden	Netherlands	1854	74.16	Q
5	Monica Theodorescu	Grunox	Germany	1845	73.80	Q
6	Klaus Balkenhol	Goldstern	Germany	1793	71.72	Q
7	Margit Otto-Crepin	Luck Lord	France	1783	71.32	Q
8	Martin Schaudt	Durgo	Germany	1781	71.24	Q
9	Nicole Uphoff-Becker	Rembrandt	Germany	1751	70.04	Q
10	Ignacio Rambla	Evento	Spain	1744	69.67	Q
11	Guenter Seidel	Graf George	United States	1734	69.36	Q
12	Lars Petersen	Uffe Korshojgaard	Denmark	1705	68.20	Q
13	Steffen Peters	Udon	United States	1695	67.80	Q
14	Tineke Bartles-de Vries	Olympic Barbria	Netherlands	1690	67.60	Q
15T	Gonnelien Rothenberger	Olympic Dondolo	Netherlands	1673	66.92	Q
15T	Annette Solmell	Strauss	Sweden	1673	66.92	Q
17	Richard Davison	AskariFoltaire	Great Britain	1668	66.72	Q
18	Ulla Hakanson	Bobby	Sweden	1666	66.64	Q
19	Christine Stueckelberger	Aquamarin	Switzerland	1662	66.48	Q
20	Arlette Holsters	Faible	Belgium	1658	66.32	Q
21	Louise Nathhorst	Walk on Top	Sweden	1657	66.28	Q
22	Dominique Brieussel	Akazie	France	1650	66.00	Q
23	Robert Dover	Metallic	United States	1649	65.96	Q
24	Mary Hanna	Mosaic	Australia	1644	65.76	Q
25	Finn Hansen	Bergerac	Denmark	1636	65.44	Q
26	Heike Holstein	Ballaseyr Devesereaux	Ireland	1631	65.24	
27	Hans Staub	Dukaat	Switzerland	1628	65.12	
28	Kyra Kyrklund	Amiral	Finland	1620	64.8	
29	Leonie Bramall	Gilbonia	Canada	1613	64.52	
30	Dominique d'Esme	Arnoldo	France	1612	64.48	
31	Caroline Hatlapa	Merlin	Austria	1609	64.36	
32	Beatriz Ferrer-Salat	Brillant	Spain	1604	64.16	
33	Eva Senn	Renzo	Switzerland	1603	64.12	
34	Pia Laus	Liebenberg	Italy	1600	64.00	
35	Paolo Giani Margi	Destino	Italy	1595	63.80	
36	Joanna Jackson	Mester Mouse	Great Britain	1577	63.08	
37	Tinne Vilhelmson	Caprice	Sweden	1542	61.68	
38	Rafael Soto	Invasor	Spain	1527	61.08	
39	Joaquin Orth	Bellini	Mexico		60.72	
40T	Vicky Thompson	Enfant	Great Britain	1516	60.64	
40T	Marie-Hélène Syre	Marlon	France	1516	60.64	
42	Suzanne Dunkley	Elliot	Bermuda	1502	60.08	
43	Daria Fantoni	Sonny Boy	Italy	1496	69.84	
44	Jane Bredin	Cupido	Great Britain	1468	58.72	
45	Evi Strasser	Lavina	Canada	1462	58.48	
46	Gina Smith	Faust	Canada	1434	57.36	
47	Fausto Puccini	Fiffikus	Italy	1418	56.72	
48	Juan Matute	Hermes	Spain	1416	56.64	
49	Barbara von Grebel-Schiendorfer	Ramar	Switzerland	1324	52.96	
n/a	Thomas Dvorak	World Cup	Canada	WD	WD	

=== Grand Prix Special 2nd Qualifier ===
Held 31 July. The second round was the Grand Prix Special 2nd Qualifier. It was similar to the first, though the time allotted was shorter. The score from this round was added to the score from the Grand Prix Test. The top 14 pairs advanced to the final.

Rank	Rider	Horse	Nation	Round 1	Judge E	Judge H	Judge C	Judge M	Judge B	Total points	% Score	Total Score	Qual
1	Anky van Grunsven	Bonfire	Netherlands	75.72	346	325	330	330	340	1671	77.72	153.44	Q
2	Isabell Werth	Gigolo	Germany	76.60	323	315	323	324	338	1623	75.49	152.09	Q
3	Michelle Gibson	Peron	United States	75.20	320	308	324	320	325	1597	74.28	149.48	Q
4	Sven Rothenberger	Weyden	Netherlands	74.16	318	310	321	327	315	1591	74.00	148.16	Q
5	Monica Theodorescu	Grunox	Germany	73.80	322	311	314	315	327	1589	73.91	147.71	Q
6	Klaus Balkenhol	Goldstern	Germany	71.72	315	311	325	315	321	1587	73.81	144.25	Q
7	Margit Otto-Crepin	Luck Lord	France	71.32	322	309	310	316	311	1568	72.93	146.26	Q
8	Nicole Uphoff-Becker	Rembrandt	Germany	70.04	318	312	315	300	325	1570	73.02	143.06	Q
9	Martin Schaudt	Durgo	Germany	71.24	296	301	312	301	316	1526	70.98	142.22	Q
10	Guenter Seidel	Graf George	United States	69.36	315	301	307	313	303	1544	71.81	141.17	Q
11	Ignacio Rambla	Evento	Spain	69.76	303	299	304	298	305	1509	70.19	139.95	Q
12	Louise Nathhorst	Walk on Top	Sweden	66.28	312	300	325	316	328	1581	73.53	139.81	Q
13	Lars Petersen	Uffe Korshojgaard	Denmark	68.20	297	297	300	292	292	1478	68.74	136.94	Q
14	Tineke Bartles-de Vries	Olympic Barbria	Netherlands	67.60	300	291	293	294	290	1468	68.28	135.88	Q
15	Steffen Peters	Udon	United States	67.80	301	286	291	285	291	1454	67.63	135.43	
16	Gonnelien Rothenberger	Olympic Dondolo	Netherlands	66.92	300	290	307	283	291	1471	68.42	135.34	
17	Christine Stueckelberger	Aquamarin	Switzerland	66.48	301	290	292	284	297	1464	68.09	134.57	
18	Arlette Holsters	Faible	Belgium	66.32	290	288	298	290	299	1465	68.14	134.46	
19	Annette Solmell	Strauss	Sweden	66.92	281	286	293	281	288	1429	66.47	133.39	
20	Ulla Hakanson	Bobby	Sweden	66.64	281	282	290	289	288	1430	65.51	133.15	
21	Richard Davison	AskariFoltaire	Great Britain	66.72	287	274	278	267	291	1397	64.98	131.70	
22	Finn Hansen	Bergerac	Denmark	65.44	282	280	295	275	279	1411	65.63	131.07	
23	Dominique Brieussel	Akazie	France	66.00	278	276	283	270	272	1379	64.14	130.14	
24	Mary Hanna	Mosaic	Australia	65.76	283	271	276	271	282	1383	64.33	130.09	
25	Robert Dover	Metallic	United States	65.96	264	248	250	252	250	1264	58.79	124.75	

=== Grand Prix Freestyle ===
Held 3 August. The final round of dressage competition was the Grand Prix Freestyle Test. Fifteen pairs competed in this round, in which they designed their own program of movements set to music. They were judged on both execution of the movements (technical) and how well their performance matched the music (artistic). Each of the five judges gave a score from 0 to 10 in both categories, with the final score for the round being the sum of those ten scores. This score was then added to the scores from the other two rounds to determine final ranking.

Rank	Rider	Horse	Nation	Judge E	Judge H	Judge C	Judge M	Judge B	Total points	% Score
1	Isabell Werth	Gigolo	Germany	16.63	16.60	16.80	16.73	16.25	83.00	83.00
2	Anky van Grunsven	Bonfire	Netherlands	15.68	16.68	15.82	15.78	15.63	79.58	79.58
3	Monica Theodorescu	Grunox	Germany	15.07	15.35	15.25	15.75	15.43	76.85	76.85
4	Sven Rothenberger	Weyden	Netherlands	14.73	15.57	15.48	15.80	15.20	76.78	76.78
5	Klaus Balkenhol	Goldstern	Germany	15.30	15.10	15.03	15.43	15.43	76.28	76.28
6	Margit Otto-Crepin	Luck Lord	France	15.40	14.70	15.18	15.40	14.88	75.55	75.55
7	Guenter Seidel	Graf George	United States	14.48	14.63	14.68	15.20	14.88	73.85	73.85
8	Michelle Gibson	Peron	United States	14.80	14.38	14.05	15.23	14.90	73.35	73.35
9	Louise Nathhorst	Walk on Top	Sweden	13.65	14.53	14.70	15.55	14.30	72.73	72.73
10	Ignacio Rambla	Evento	Spain	13.90	14.30	14.73	14.82	14.43	72.18	72.18
11	Lars Petersen	Uffe Korshojgaard	Denmark	13.55	14.30	14.53	14.57	13.93	70.88	70.88
12	Martin Schaudt	Durgo	Germany	13.60	13.75	13.85	14.78	14.55	70.53	70.53
13	Tineke Bartles-de Vries	Olympic Barbria	Netherlands	13.40	14.23	14.00	14.30	13.73	69.66	69.66

=== Final rankings ===
Rank	Rider	Horse	Nation	Grand Prix	Grand Prix Special	Grand Prix Freestyle	Total
1	Isabell Werth	Gigolo	Germany	76.60	75.49	83.00	235.09
2	Anky van Grunsven	Bonfire	Netherlands	75.72	77.72	79.58	233.02
3	Sven Rothenberger	Weyden	Netherlands	74.16	74.00	76.78	224.94
4	Monica Theodorescu	Grunox	Germany	73.80	73.91	76.85	224.56
5	Michelle Gibson	Peron	United States	75.20	74.28	73.35	222.83
6	Klaus Balkenhol	Goldstern	Germany	71.72	73.81	76.28	221.81
7	Margit Otto-Crepin	Luck Lord	France	71.32	72.93	76.65	219.80
8	Guenter Seidel	Graf George	United States	69.36	71.81	73.85	215.02
9	Martin Schaudt	Durgo	Germany	71.24	70.98	70.53	212.75
10	Louise Nathhorst	Walk on Top	Sweden	66.28	73.53	72.73	212.54
11	Ignacio Rambla	Evento	Spain	69.76	70.19	72.18	212.13
12	Lars Petersen	Uffe Korshojgaard	Denmark	68.20	68.74	70.88	207.82
13	Tineke Bartles-de Vries	Olympic Barbria	Netherlands	67.60	68.28	69.66	205.54

== Sources ==
- Official Report of the 1996 Atlanta Summer Olympics available at https://web.archive.org/web/20060622162855/http://www.la84foundation.org/5va/reports_frmst.htm
