= Equestrian at the 1996 Summer Olympics – Team dressage =

Team dressage at the Games of the XXVI Olympiad
- Venue: Georgia International Horse Park
- Date: 26 July & 27 July 1996
- Competitors: 10 teams from 10 nations

Medalists
| 1st place, gold medalist(s) | | Isabell Werth; Monica Theodorescu; Klaus Balkenhol; Martin Schaudt | Germany |
| 2nd place, silver medalist(s) | | Anky van Grunsven; Sven Rothenberger; Tineke Bartels; Gonnelien Rothenberger | Netherlands |
| 3rd place, bronze medalist(s) | | Michelle Gibson; Guenter Seidel; Steffen Peters; Robert Dover | United States |

The team dressage event, part of the equestrian program at the 1996 Summer Olympics was held on 27 and 28 July 1996 at the Georgia International Horse Park, in Conyers, Georgia. The results of the first round of the individual dressage were used to award rankings. Like all other equestrian events, the dressage competition was mixed gender, with both male and female athletes competing in the same division. Nine teams, each consisting of four horse and rider pairs, entered the contest. The 1996 Olympic Games saw the debut of the Grand Prix Freestyle to Music (Kür). Germany's Isabell Werth was awarded the individual gold medal.

== Medalists ==
| Gold: | | Silver: | | Bronze: | |
| Germany | | Netherlands | | United States | |
| Isabell Werth | Gigolo | Tineke Bartles-de Vries | Olympic Barbria | Robert Dover | Metallic |
| Klaus Balkenhol | Goldstern | Sven Rothenberger | Weyden | Michelle Gibson | Peron |
| Monica Theodorescu | Grunox | Anky van Grunsven | Bonfire | Steffen Peters | Udon |
| Martin Schaudt | Durgo | Gonnelien Rothenberger | Olympic Dondolo | Guenter Seidel | Graf George |

== Results ==
| Rank | NOC | Rider | Horse | Judge E | Judge H | Judge C | Judge M | Judge B | Scored | Points | Team Points |
|---|---|---|---|---|---|---|---|---|---|---|---|
| 1 | Germany | Isabell Werth | Gigolo | 386 | 390 | 387 | 378 | 374 | # | 1915 | 5553 |
| 1 | Germany | Klaus Balkenhol | Goldstern | 358 | 363 | 366 | 359 | 347 | # | 1793 | 5553 |
| 1 | Germany | Monica Theodorescu | Grunox | 365 | 370 | 376 | 368 | 366 | # | 1845 | 5553 |
| 1 | Germany | Martin Schaudt | Durgo | 365 | 347 | 360 | 355 | 354 | | 1781 | 5553 |
| 2 | Netherlands | Tineke Bartles-de Vries | Olympic Barbria | 330 | 340 | 335 | 346 | 339 | # | 1690 | 5437 |
| 2 | Netherlands | Sven Rothenberger | Weyden | 380 | 367 | 373 | 377 | 357 | # | 1854 | 5437 |
| 2 | Netherlands | Anky van Grunsven | Bonfire | 382 | 382 | 383 | 378 | 368 | # | 1893 | 5437 |
| 2 | Netherlands | Gonnelien Rothenberger | Olympic Dondolo | 339 | 340 | 332 | 341 | 321 | | 1673 | 5437 |
| 3 | United States | Robert Dover | Metallic | 315 | 336 | 326 | 339 | 333 | | 1649 | 5309 |
| 3 | United States | Michelle Gibson | Peron | 393 | 378 | 377 | 370 | 362 | # | 1880 | 5309 |
| 3 | United States | Steffen Peters | Udon | 351 | 342 | 342 | 332 | 328 | # | 1695 | 5309 |
| 3 | United States | Guenter Seidel | Graf George | 355 | 354 | 341 | 355 | 329 | # | 1734 | 5309 |
| 4 | France | Dominique d'Esme | Arnoldo | 313 | 325 | 326 | 320 | 328 | # | 1612 | 5045 |
| 4 | France | Margit Otto-Crepin | Luck Lord | 351 | 365 | 355 | 353 | 359 | # | 1783 | 5045 |
| 4 | France | Dominique Brieussel | Akazie | 324 | 335 | 328 | 328 | 335 | # | 1650 | 5045 |
| 4 | France | Marie-Helene Syre | Marlon | 305 | 307 | 295 | 308 | 301 | # | 1516 | 5045 |
| 5 | Sweden | Tinne Vilhelmson | Caprice | 312 | 329 | 318 | 308 | 275 | | 1542 | 4996 |
| 5 | Sweden | Annette Solmell | Strauss | 330 | 335 | 346 | 336 | 326 | # | 1673 | 4996 |
| 5 | Sweden | Ulla Hakanson | Bobby | 338 | 336 | 337 | 329 | 326 | # | 1666 | 4996 |
| 5 | Sweden | Louise Nathhorst | Walk on Top | 328 | 344 | 320 | 328 | 337 | # | 1657 | 4996 |
| 6 | Switzerland | Eva Senn | Renzo | 321 | 325 | 320 | 322 | 315 | # | 1603 | 4893 |
| 6 | Switzerland | Hans Staub | Dukaat | 324 | 321 | 338 | 322 | 323 | # | 1628 | 4893 |
| 6 | Switzerland | Christine Stueckelberger | Aquamarin | 328 | 330 | 337 | 325 | 342 | # | 1662 | 4893 |
| 6 | Switzerland | Barbara von Grebel-Schiendorfer | Ramar | 273 | 262 | 257 | 263 | 269 | | 1324 | 4893 |
| 7 | Spain | Rafael Soto | Invasor | 311 | 309 | 296 | 299 | 312 | # | 1527 | 4875 |
| 7 | Spain | Beatriz Ferrer-Salat | Brillant | 323 | 318 | 326 | 323 | 314 | # | 1604 | 4875 |
| 7 | Spain | Juan Matute | Hermes | 292 | 300 | 286 | 280 | 258 | | 1416 | 4875 |
| 7 | Spain | Ignacio Rambla | Evento | 347 | 344 | 355 | 349 | 349 | # | 1744 | 4875 |
| 8 | Great Britain | Joanna Jackson | Mester Mouse | 320 | 319 | 316 | 321 | 301 | # | 1577 | 4761 |
| 8 | Great Britain | Jane Bredin | Cupido | 286 | 304 | 306 | 288 | 284 | | 1468 | 4761 |
| 8 | Great Britain | Vicky Thompson | Enfant | 301 | 310 | 300 | 301 | 304 | # | 1516 | 4761 |
| 8 | Great Britain | Richard Davison | Askari | 325 | 341 | 330 | 332 | 330 | # | 1668 | 4761 |
| 9 | Italy | Paolo Giani Margi | Destino | 304 | 334 | 320 | 320 | 317 | # | 1595 | 4691 |
| 9 | Italy | Fausto Puccini | Fiffikus | 272 | 289 | 290 | 282 | 285 | | 1418 | 4691 |
| 9 | Italy | Daria Fantoni | Sonny Boy | 313 | 295 | 297 | 301 | 290 | # | 1496 | 4691 |
| 9 | Italy | Pia Laus | Liebenberg | 321 | 325 | 320 | 329 | 305 | # | 1600 | 4691 |
| 10 | Canada | Thomas Dvorak | World Cup | | | | | | | "WD" | 4691 |
| 10 | Canada | Evi Strasser | Lavina | 294 | 301 | 290 | 291 | 286 | # | 1462 | 4691 |
| 10 | Canada | Leonie Bramall | Gilbonia | 320 | 322 | 328 | 332 | 311 | # | 1643 | 4691 |
| 10 | Canada | Gina Smith | Faust | 295 | 297 | 288 | 280 | 274 | # | 1434 | 4691 |
