= Individual dressage at the 1998 World Equestrian Games =

The individual dressage at the 1998 FEI World Equestrian Games in Rome, Italy was held from 1 to 11 October 1998.

== Competition format ==
The team and individual dressage competitions used the same results. Dressage had three phases. The first phase was the Grand Prix. Top 23 individuals advanced to the second phase, the Grand Prix Special where the first individual medals were awarded. The last set of medals at the 2026 World Dressage Championships was awarded after the third phase, the Grand Prix Freestyle where top 12 combinations competed, where the medals were divided among the overall best scoring riders from the GP, GPS and GPF combined.

== Results ==
Rider	Nation	Horse	GP score	Rank	GPS score	Rank	GPF score	Rank
Isabell Werth	Germany	Gigolo	77.800	1 Q	79.350	2nd place, silver medalist(s)	84.570	1st place, gold medalist(s)
Anky van Grunsven	Netherlands	Bonfire	77.480	2 Q	79.490	1st place, gold medalist(s)	84.420	2nd place, silver medalist(s)
Louise Nathorst	Sweden	Walk On Top	73.480	3 Q	71.670	7 Q	76.860	5
Karin Rehbein	Germany	Donnerhall	73.200	4 Q	73.300	4 Q	76.210	4
Nadine Capellmann	Germany	Gracioso	72.720	5 Q	72.790	6 Q	75.490	7
Ulla Salzgeber	Germany	Rusty	72.320	6 Q	73.440	3rd place, bronze medalist(s)	79.240	3rd place, bronze medalist(s)
Coby van Baalen	Netherlands	Ferro	72.240	7 Q	73.210	5 Q	75.680	6
Guenter Seidel	United States of America	Graf George	70.840	8 Q	71.160	10 Q	71.830	9
Ellen Bontje	Netherlands	Silvano N	70.800	9 Q	71.440	8 Q	72.930	8
Kyra Kyrklund	Finland	Flyinge Amiral	69.200	10 Q	68.790	12 Q	72.210	10
Lars Petersen	Denmark	Blue Hors Cavan	68.640	11 Q	69.260	11 Q	70.240	11
Ignacio Rambla	Spain	Evento	68.320	12 Q	66.190	18		
Margit Otto-Crépin	France	Lucky Lord V	67.880	13 Q	67.810	15		
Christine Stückelberger	Switzerland	Aquamarin	67.640	14 Q	71.440	9		
Susan Blinks	United States of America	Flim Flam	67.560	15 Q	68.700	13 Q	70.040	12
Robert Dover	United States of America	Lennox	67.520	16 Q	66.880	17		
Elena Sidneva	Russia	Podkhod	67.200	17 Q	64.510	23		
Ulla Håkanson	Sweden	Flyinge Bobby	67.040 %	18 Q	68.000	14		
Gonnelien Rothenberger	Netherlands	Dondolo	66.800	19 Q	66.980	16		
Anne van Olst	Denmark	Dempsey	66.720	20 Q	65.020	21		
Annette Solmell	Sweden	Flyinge Strauss 689	66.680	21				
Anna Bienias	Poland	Celbant	66.480	22 Q	64.650	22		
Arlette Holsters	Belgium	Faible	66.440	23 Q	65.950	19		
Emile Faurie	Great Britain	Legrini	66.200	24 Q	65.160	20		
Jon Pedersen	Denmark	Esprit de Valdemar	66.160	25				
Jan Brink	Sweden	Bjorsell’s Fontana	66.040	26				
José Manuel Lucena	Spain	Elorianne	65.640	27				
Sandy Phillips	Great Britain	Fun	65.600	28				
Heike Holstein	Ireland	Ballaseyr Legend	65.440	29				
Rafael Soto	Spain	Invasor	65.040	30				
Janne Bergh	Finland	Chimkent	64.960	31				
Richard Davison	Great Britain	Hiscox Askari	64.840	32				
Beatriz Ferrer-Salat	Spain	Vital Robert Brilant	64.800	33				
Ferdi Eilberg	Great Britain	Arun Tor	64.760	34				
Shelly Francis	United States of America	Pikant	64.560	35				
Caroline Hatlapa	Austria	Merlin TSF	64.560	36				
Nina Menkova	Russia	Garpun	64.440	37				
Peter Gmoser	Austria	Candidat	64.280	38				
Kristy Oatley-Nist	Australia	Rosemount Maurice	64.240	39				
Suzanne Dunkley	Bermuda	Elliot	63.880	40				
Oded Shimoni	Israel	Amora	63.840	41				
Jasmine Sanche	Switzerland	Plaisir d’Amour	63.840	42				
Gyula Dallos	Hungary	Ba’Bolna Aktion	63.800	43				
Daniel Ramseier	Switzerland	Rali Baba	63.760	44				
Heini Naukkarinen	Finland	Patrick of Finland	63.600	45				
Daniel Pinto	Portugal	Weldon Surprise	63.440	46				
Victoria Winter	Canada	Wedgwood	63.400	47				
Finn Hansen	Denmark	Bergerac	63.160	48				
Liz Hopps	Canada	Elymas	63.160	49				
Joaquin Orth	Mexico	Bellini	63.040	50				
Bernadette Pujals	Mexico	Emir	63.040	51				
Jeanette Lechner Gebhard	Austria	Winergy	63.000	52				
Mieko Yagi	Japan	Tasio Ramon	62.920	53				
Heidi Svanborg	Finland	Bazalt	62.920	54				
Ricky MacMillan	Australia	Crisp	62.800	55				
Mary Hanna	Australia	Mosaic II	62.680	56				
Monica Gheno	Italy	Destino di Acciarella	62.600	57				
Natalie Hobday	South Africa	Edelmann	62.600	58				
Dominique Brieussel	France	Akazie	62.320	59				
Susumu Shinomiya	Japan	Gazpacho	62.120	60				
Pierre Rossy	Luxembourg	Chess	62.080	61				
Mauro Roman	Italy	Rigoletto VI	61.920	62				
Per Waaler	Norway	Star Fortune	61.880	63				
Antonio Rivera	Mexico	Aczydos	61.400	64				
Kuranojo Saito	Japan	Dugal	61.360	65				
Cindy Kent	New Zealand	Playschool	61.320	66				
Sandra Walther	Austria	Dukaat	61.280	67				
Pia Laus	Italy	Renoir	61.200	68				
Kjersti Jensen	Norway	Happy Duke	61.120	69				
Catherine Smallbone	New Zealand	Alzac	60.920	70				
James Connor	Italy	Rubino	60.520	71				
Marietta Almasy	France	Quixote Priboy 3	60.520	72				
Yvette Truesdale	Ireland	Accolade	60.480	73				
Inessa Poturajeva	Russia	Targim	60.080	74				
Kallista Field	New Zealand	Janeiro	59.400	75				
Natalia Dombroyskaya	Russia	Damar	59.320	76				
Nancy French	Australia	Wiking	58.800	77				
Tatiana Jelobkovitch	Bulgaria	Potomok	58.120	78				
Nancy Maclachlan	Canada	Davis Cup	57.920	79				
Barbara von Grebel	Switzerland	Ramar	57.440	80				
George Miechowsky	Canada	Leonti	56.960	81				
Toshihiko Kiso	Japan	Giani Naniny	55.120	82				
Katy Bradley-Lynn	Ireland	Diamant II	RT	83				
Florence Lenzini	France	Ravel	EL	84				
