= World Dressage Championships =

Equestrian competition

The World Dressage Championships is held every four years. The best horse and rider competitions in the world compete for individual and team titles. The Dressage World Championship is since 1990, held at the World Equestrian Games in conjunction with other equestrian world championships.

== Individual Results ==
Individual medalists
Year	Location	Event	Gold	Silver	Bronze
1966	(Switzerland) Bern	Individual	(West Germany) Josef Neckermann on Mariano	(West Germany) Harry Boldt on Remus	(West Germany) Reiner Klimke on Dux
1970	(West Germany) Aachen	Individual	(Soviet Union) Elena Petushkova on Pepel	(West Germany) Liselott Linsenhoff on Piaff	(Soviet Union) Ivan Kizimov on Ichor
1974	(Denmark) Copenhagen	Individual	(West Germany) Reiner Klimke on Mehmed	(West Germany) Liselott Linsenhoff on Piaff	(Soviet Union) Elena Petushkova on Pepel
1978	(United Kingdom) Goodwood	Individual	(Switzerland) Christine Stückelberger on Granat	(West Germany) Uwe Schulten-Baumer on Silbowitz	(United Kingdom) Jennie Loriston-Clarke on Dutch Courage
1982	(Switzerland) Lausanne	Individual	(West Germany) Reiner Klimke on Ahlerich	(Switzerland) Christine Stückelberger on Granat	(West Germany) Uwe Schulten-Baumer on Madras
1986	(Canada) Cedar Valley	Individual	(Denmark) Anne Grethe Jensen on Marzog	(Switzerland) Christine Stückelberger on Gauguin de Lully	(West Germany) Johann Hinnemann on Ideaal
1990	(Sweden) Stockholm	Individual	(Germany) Nicole Uphoff on Rembrandt	(Finland) Kyra Kyrklund on Matador	(Germany) Monica Theodorescu on Ganimedes
1994	(Netherlands) The Hague	Spécial	(Germany) Isabell Werth on Gigolo	(Germany) Nicole Uphoff on Rembrandt	(Netherlands) Sven Rothenberger on Dondolo
1994	(Netherlands) The Hague	Freestyle	(Netherlands) Anky van Grunsven on Bonfire	(Germany) Klaus Balkenhol on Goldstern	(Germany) Karin Rehbein on Donnerhall
1998	(Italy) Rome	Individual	(Germany) Isabell Werth on Gigolo	(Netherlands) Anky van Grunsven on Bonfire	(Germany) Ulla Salzgeber on Rusty
2002	(Spain) Jerez de la Frontera	Individual	(Germany) Nadine Capellmann on Farbenfroh	(Spain) Beatriz Ferrer-Salat on Beauvalais	(Germany) Ulla Salzgeber on Rusty
2006	(Germany) Aachen	Spécial	(Germany) Isabell Werth on Satchmo	(Netherlands) Anky van Grunsven on Salinero	(Denmark) Andreas Helgstrand on Matine
2006	(Germany) Aachen	Freestyle	(Netherlands) Anky van Grunsven on Salinero	(Denmark) Andreas Helgstrand on Matine	(Germany) Isabell Werth on Satchmo
2010	(United States) Lexington	Spécial	(Netherlands) Edward Gal on Totilas	(United Kingdom) Laura Bechtolsheimer on Mistral Hojris	(United States) Steffen Peters on Ravel
2010	(United States) Lexington	Freestyle	(Netherlands) Edward Gal on Totilas	(United Kingdom) Laura Bechtolsheimer on Mistral Hojris	(United States) Steffen Peters on Ravel
2014	(France) Normandy	Spécial	(United Kingdom) Charlotte Dujardin on Valegro	(Germany) Helen Langehanenberg on Damon Hill	(Germany) Kristina Sprehe on Desperados
2014	(France) Normandy	Freestyle	(United Kingdom) Charlotte Dujardin on Valegro	(Germany) Helen Langehanenberg on Damon Hill	(Netherlands) Adelinde Cornelissen on Parzival
2018	(United States) Tryon	Spécial	(Germany) Isabell Werth on Bella Rose	(United States) Laura Graves on Verdades	(United Kingdom) Charlotte Dujardin on Freestyle
2018	(United States) Tryon	Freestyle	Competition cancelled due to Hurricane Florence		
2022	(Denmark) Herning	Spécial	(United Kingdom) Charlotte Fry on Glamourdale	(Denmark) Cathrine Laudrup-Dufour on Vamos Amigos	(Netherlands) Dinja van Liere on Hermes
2022	(Denmark) Herning	Freestyle	(United Kingdom) Charlotte Fry on Glamourdale	(Denmark) Cathrine Laudrup-Dufour on Vamos Amigos	(Netherlands) Dinja van Liere on Hermes
2026	(Germany) Aachen	Spécial	(United Kingdom) Charlotte Fry on Glamourdale	(Denmark) Cathrine Laudrup-Dufour on Freestyle	(Germany) Katharina Hemmer on Denoix PCH
2026	(Germany) Aachen	Freestyle	(United Kingdom) Charlotte Fry on Glamourdale	(Denmark) Cathrine Laudrup-Dufour on Freestyle	(Germany) Isabell Werth on Wendy de Fontaine

== Team results ==
Team medalists
Year	Location	Gold	Silver	Bronze
1966	(Switzerland) Bern	West Germany; Reiner Klimke on Dux; Harry Boldt on Remus; Josef Neckermann on Antoinette	Switzerland; Henri Chammartin on Wolfdietrich; Gustav Fischer on Wald; Marianne Gossweiler on Stephan	Soviet Union; Ivan Kizimov on Ikhor; Elena Petushkova on Pepel; Mikhael Kopeykin on Korbej
1970	(West Germany) Aachen	Soviet Union; Ivan Kalita on Tarif; Ivan Kizimov on Ikhor; Elena Petushkova on Pepel	West Germany; Liselott Linsenhoff on Piaff; Josef Neckermann on Mariano; Harry Boldt on Silverdream	East Germany; Horst Köhler on Neuschnee; Wolfgang Müller on Marios; Gerhard Brockmüller on Tristan
1974	(Denmark) Copenhagen	West Germany; Reiner Klimke on Mehmed; Liselott Linsenhoff on Piaff; Karin Schlüter on Liostro	Soviet Union; Elena Petushkova on Pepel; Ivan Kalita on Tarif; Ivan Kizimov on Ikhor	Switzerland; Christine Stückelberger on Granat; Hermann Dür on Sod; Regula Pfrunder on Merry Boy
1978	(United Kingdom) Goodwood	West Germany; Uwe Schulten-Baumer on Silbowitz; Harry Boldt on Woyceck; Gabriela Grillo on Ultimo	Switzerland; Christine Stückelberger on Granat; Ulrich Lehmann on Widin; Claire Koch on Scorpio	Soviet Union; Irina Karacheva on Said; Viktor Ugryumov on Skkval; Elena Petushkova on Abakan
1982	(Switzerland) Lausanne	West Germany; Uwe Schulten-Baumer on Madras; Gabriela Grillo on Galapagos; Reiner Klimke on Ahlerich	Switzerland; Christine Stückelberger on Granat; Doris Ramseier on River King; Claire Koch on Scorpio	Denmark; Anne Grethe Jensen on Marzog; Tove Jorck-Jorckston on Lazuly; Finn Saksö-Larsen on Coq d'Or
1986	(Canada) Cedar Valley	West Germany; Reiner Klimke on Pascal; Herbert Krug on Dukat; Gina Capellmann on Ampere; Johann Hinnemann on Ideaal	Netherlands; Annemarie Sanders-Keyzer on Amon; Bert Rutten on Robby; Tineke Bartels on Olympic Duco; Helene Aubert on Mr. X	Switzerland; Christine Stückelberger on Gauguin; Ulrich Lehmann on Xanthos; Doris Ramseier on Rochus; Daniel Ramseier on Orlando
1990	(Sweden) Stockholm	Germany; Nicole Uphoff on Rembrandt; Monica Theodorescu on Ganimedes; Sven Rothenberger on Ideaal; Ann-Kathrin Linsenhoff on Golfstom	Soviet Union; Olga Klimko on Shipovnik; Valery Tishkov on Kholst; Nina Menkova on Dikson; Yuriy Kovshov on Bouket	Switzerland; Samuel Schatzmann on Rochus; Christine Stückelberger on Gauguin; Silvia Iklé on Spada; Daniel Ramseier on Random
1994	(Netherlands) The Hague	Germany; Isabell Werth on Gigolo; Klaus Balkenhol on Goldstern; Karin Rehbein on Donnerhall; Nicole Uphoff on Rembrandt	Netherlands; Sven Rothenberger on Dondolo; Anky van Grunsven on Bonfire; Ellen Bontje on Heuriger	United States; Robert Dover on Devereaux; Gary Rockwell on Suna; Carol Lavell on Gifted; Kathleen Raine on Avontuur
1998	(Italy) Rome	Germany; Ulla Salzgeber on Rusty; Nadine Capellmann on Gracioso; Karin Rehbein on Donnerhall; Isabell Werth on Gigolo	Netherlands; Gonnelien Rothenberger on Dondolo; Ellen Bontje on Silvano; Coby van Baalen on Ferro; Anky van Grunsven on Bonfire	Sweden; Annette Solmell on Strauss; Ulla Håkansson on Bobby; Louise Nathhorst on Walk On Top; Jan Brink on Fontana
2002	(Spain) Jerez de la Frontera	Germany; Nadine Capellmann on Farbenfroh; Ulla Salzgeber on Rusty; Klaus Husenbeth on Picollino; Ann-Kathrin Linsenhoff on Renoir	United States; Debbie McDonald on Brentina; Lisa Wilcox on Relevant; Susan Blinks on Flim Flam; Günter Seidel on Nikolaus	Spain; Beatriz Ferrer-Salat on Beauvalais; Rafael Soto on Invasor; Juan Antonio Jimenez on Guizo; Ignacio Rambla on Granadero
2006	(Germany) Aachen	Germany; Nadine Capellmann on Elvis VA; Isabell Werth on Satchmo; Heike Kemmer on Bonaparte; Hubertus Schmidt on Wansuela Suerte	Netherlands; Imke Schellekens-Bartels on Sunrise; Laurens van Lieren on Ollright; Edward Gal on Lingh; Anky van Grunsven on Salinero	United States; Steffen Peters on Floriano; Debbie McDonald on Brentina; Leslie Morse on Tip Top; Günter Seidel on Aragon
2010	(United States) Lexington	Netherlands; Edward Gal on Totilas; Imke Schellekens-Bartels on Sunrise; Hans Peter Minderhoud on Nadine; Adelinde Cornelissen on Parzival	Great Britain; Laura Bechtolsheimer on Mistral Hojris; Carl Hester on Liebling II; Fiona Bigwood on Atlantico; Maria Eilberg on Two Sox	Germany; Isabell Werth on Warum Nicht; Christoph Koschel on Donnperignon; Matthias Alexander Rath on Sterntaler; Anabel Balkenhol on Dablino
2014	(France) Normandy	Germany; Isabell Werth on Bella Rose; Helen Langehanenberg on Damon Hill; Kristina Sprehe on Desperados; Fabienne Lütkemeier on d'Agostino	Great Britain; Charlotte Dujardin on Valegro; Carl Hester on Nip Tuck; Michael Eilberg on Half Moon Delphi; Gareth Hughes on Nadonna	Netherlands; Adelinde Cornelissen on Parzival; Hans Peter Minderhoud on Johnson; Diederik van Silfhout on Arlando; Edward Gal on Voice
2018	(United States) Tryon	Germany; Jessica von Bredow-Werndl on Dalera; Dorothee Schneider on Showtime; Sönke Rothenberger on Cosmo; Isabell Werth on Bella Rose	United States; Steffen Peters on Suppenkasper; Adrienne Lyle on Salvino; Kasey Perry-Glass on Dublet; Laura Graves on Verdades	Great Britain; Spencer Wilton on Super Nova; Emile Faurie on Dono di Maggio; Carl Hester on Delicato; Charlotte Dujardin on Freestyle
2022	(Denmark) Herning	Denmark; Nanna Merrald Rasmussen on Blue Hors Zack; Carina Cassøe Krüth on Heiline's Danciera; Daniel Bachmann Andersen on Marshall-Bell; Cathrine Laudrup-Dufour on Vamos Amigos	Great Britain; Richard Davison on Bubblingh; Gareth Hughes on Classic Briolinca; Charlotte Dujardin on Imhotep; Charlotte Fry on Glamourdale	Germany; Ingrid Klimke on Franziskus; Benjamin Werndl on Famoso; Isabell Werth on Quantaz; Frederic Wandres on Duke of Britain
2026	(Germany) Aachen	Germany; Isabell Werth on Wendy de Fontaine; Katharina Hemmer on Denoix PCH; Frederic Wandres on Bluetooth OLD; Raphael Netz on Great Escape Camelot	Great Britain; Charlotte Fry on Glamourdale; Becky Moody on Jagerbomb; Carl Hester on Fame; Fiona Bigwood Donna Bella	Denmark; Daniel Bachmann Andersen on Flash Gordon 37; Cathrine Laudrup-Dufour on Freestyle; Nadja Aaboe Sloth on Favour Gersdorf; Carina Cassøe Krüth on Heiline's Danciera

== Medal count ==
Rank	Nation	Gold	Silver	Bronze	Total
1	Germany	22	9	13	44
2	Great Britain	6	6	3	15
3	Netherlands	5	6	5	16
4	Denmark	2	5	3	10
5	Soviet Union	2	2	4	8
6	Switzerland	1	5	3	9
7	United States	0	3	4	7
8	Spain	0	1	1	2
9	Finland	0	1	0	1
10	East Germany	0	0	1	1
10	Sweden	0	0	1	1
Totals (11 entries)		38	38	38	114

- Note 1: Medal count is sorted by total gold medals, then total silver medals, then total bronze medals, then alphabetically.
- Note 2: Germany includes both Germany and West Germany.
