= Udon (disambiguation) =

Udon is a type of noodle used in Japanese cuisine.

Udon may also refer to:

- Udon Entertainment, a Canadian art studio and publisher
- Udon Thani Province, a province in Thailand
  - Udon Thani, capital city of Udon Thani Province
- Udon (horse), a horse that competed in dressage with Steffen Peters
- Udon (2006), Japanese movie.
