= Joanna Jackson =

Joanna Jackson may refer to:

- Johanna Jackson (born 1985), British race walker
- Joanna Jackson (equestrian) (born 1970), British equestrian
