= Holster (disambiguation) =

A holster is a device used to hold or restrict the undesired movement of a handgun.

Holster may also refer to:

- Police duty belt, a belt used to carrying law enforcement equipment
- A type of mobile phone case

== Music ==
- Holster, a French hip hop duo formed by Sultan and Ibrahim
- "Strike (Holster)", a 2023 song by Lil Yachty

== People ==
- Fredrik Holster (born 1988), Swedish footballer
- Marco Holster (born 1971), Dutch footballer
- Arlette Holsters, (born 1961), Belgian equestrian
