= Isabell Werth =

German equestrian

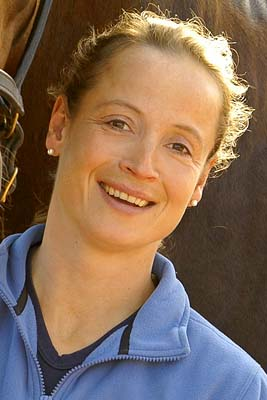
- Werth in 2004

Personal information
- Born: 21 July 1969 (age 57) Issum, West Germany
Medal record
Event	1st	2nd	3rd
Olympic Games	8	6	0
World Championships	9	0	3
European Championships	21	5	1
World Cup	5	5	4
Total	43	15	8
Equestrian
Representing Germany
Olympic Games
Gold medal – first place	1992 Barcelona	Team dressage
Gold medal – first place	1996 Atlanta	Team dressage
Gold medal – first place	1996 Atlanta	Individual dressage
Gold medal – first place	2000 Sydney	Team dressage
Gold medal – first place	2008 Beijing	Team dressage
Gold medal – first place	2016 Rio de Janeiro	Team dressage
Gold medal – first place	2020 Tokyo	Team dressage
Gold medal – first place	2024 Paris	Team dressage
Silver medal – second place	1992 Barcelona	Individual dressage
Silver medal – second place	2000 Sydney	Individual dressage
Silver medal – second place	2008 Beijing	Individual dressage
Silver medal – second place	2016 Rio de Janeiro	Individual dressage
Silver medal – second place	2020 Tokyo	Individual dressage
Silver medal – second place	2024 Paris	Individual dressage
World Championships
Gold medal – first place	1994 The Hague	Team dressage
Gold medal – first place	1994 The Hague	Special dressage
Gold medal – first place	1998 Rome	Team dressage
Gold medal – first place	1998 Rome	Individual dressage
Gold medal – first place	2006 Aachen	Team dressage
Gold medal – first place	2006 Aachen	Special dressage
Gold medal – first place	2014 Normandy	Team dressage
Gold medal – first place	2018 Tryon	Team dressage
Gold medal – first place	2018 Tryon	Special dressage
Gold medal – first place	2026 Aachen	Team dressage
Bronze medal – third place	2006 Aachen	Freestyle dressage
Bronze medal – third place	2010 Kentucky	Team dressage
Bronze medal – third place	2022 Herning	Team dressage
Bronze medal – third place	2026 Aachen	Freestyle dressage
European Championships
Gold medal – first place	1989 Mondorf	Team dressage
Gold medal – first place	1991 Donaueschingen	Team dressage
Gold medal – first place	1991 Donaueschingen	Special dressage
Gold medal – first place	1993 Lipica	Team dressage
Gold medal – first place	1993 Lipica	Special dressage
Gold medal – first place	1995 Mondorf	Team dressage
Gold medal – first place	1995 Mondorf	Individual dressage
Gold medal – first place	1997 Verden	Team dressage
Gold medal – first place	1997 Verden	Individual dressage
Gold medal – first place	1999 Arnhem	Team dressage
Gold medal – first place	2001 Verden	Team dressage
Gold medal – first place	2003 Hickstead	Team dressage
Gold medal – first place	2007 La Mandria	Special dressage
Gold medal – first place	2013 Herning	Team dressage
Gold medal – first place	2017 Gothenburg	Team dressage
Gold medal – first place	2017 Gothenburg	Special dressage
Gold medal – first place	2017 Gothenburg	Freestyle dressage
Gold medal – first place	2019 Rotterdam	Team dressage
Gold medal – first place	2019 Rotterdam	Special dressage
Gold medal – first place	2019 Rotterdam	Freestyle dressage
Gold medal – first place	2021 Hagen	Team dressage
Silver medal – second place	2007 La Mandria	Freestyle dressage
Silver medal – second place	2007 La Mandria	Team dressage
Silver medal – second place	2011 Rotterdam	Team dressage
Silver medal – second place	2023 Riesenbeck	Team dressage
Bronze medal – third place	2015 Aachen	Team dressage
World Cup
Gold medal – first place	1992 Gothenburg	Individual dressage
Gold medal – first place	2007 Las Vegas	Individual dressage
Gold medal – first place	2017 Omaha	Individual dressage
Gold medal – first place	2018 Paris	Individual dressage
Gold medal – first place	2019 Gothenburg	Individual dressage
Silver medal – second place	1999 Dortmund	Individual dressage
Silver medal – second place	2001 Aarhus	Individual dressage
Silver medal – second place	2006 Amsterdam	Individual dressage
Silver medal – second place	2008 Den Bosch	Individual dressage
Silver medal – second place	2009 Las Vegas	Individual dressage
Silver medal – second place	2025 Basel	Individual dressage
Bronze medal – third place	1993 Den Bosch	Individual dressage
Bronze medal – third place	1998 Gothenburg	Individual dressage
Bronze medal – third place	2022 Leipzig	Individual dressage
Bronze medal – third place	2023 Omaha	Individual dressage
Bronze medal – third place	2024 Riyadh	Individual dressage

Isabell Werth (born 21 July 1969 in Issum) is a German equestrian who has competed in dressage at seven Olympic Games —1992, 1996, 2000, 2008, 2016, 2020, 2024— winning the gold medal in the team event in all seven, and one gold and six silver medals in the individual event. She stands alone in having medals from seven Olympics, or across a span of 32 years; her 14 medals are the most for any German or equestrian. She also has numerous titles in the World and European Championships and World Cups.

== Career ==
Werth rode Gigolo, owned by Uwe Schulten-Baumer, her coach from 1986 to 2001. On Gigolo, she won all her championships between 1992 and 2000, save for the 1999 European Championships in Arnheim, where she rode Anthony FRH. In 2006, she started riding Warum Nicht FRH at the international level and with him won the 2007 World Cup in Las Vegas. Warum Nicht retired in 2012. Werth competed at the Olympic Games with Satchmo, who subsequently retired in November 2011. In 2010, Werth started riding El Santo at the international level until the horse was transferred in 2016 to Spanish rider José Antonio Garcia Mena.

In 2016, Werth secured the ride on Weihegold Old, with whom she won the team gold medal and a silver medal in the Individual Dressage at the Rio Olympics.

In July 2024, she was named to the German dressage team for the Paris Olympic games with Wendy. It will be her seventh Olympic games.

== Controversies ==
On 24 June 2009, the forbidden substance fluphenazine was found in the A-sample from Werth's horse Whisper at a Whitsun tournament at Wiesbaden. She was suspended from all tournaments by the International Federation for Equestrian Sports (FEI). On 2 September 2009, the suspension was set by the FEI to six months from 23 June.

Werth subsequently stated that the drug was given to the horse to treat equine shivers—mainly for the safety of the horse's handlers—and that she does not believe the drug influences a horse's ability to compete. She apologized for the positive result. The German Federation requested doubling Werth's suspension to one year as they considered the positive result to be intentional. Fluphenazine is not a medication approved for animal use in Germany.

In 2013, Werth was banned from competing once again after her mount El Santo was found to test positive for a prohibited medication, cimetidine at a competition in 2012.

In 2022, Werth was eliminated from the CHIO Aachen after blood appeared on her horse during the competition.

== Computer game ==
In 2007, a PC Game was released called "Isabell Werth – Reitsport". Made by French company Dancing Dots / German publisher Frogster Interactive, it is an Equestrian Simulation with 3-day Eventing, Show Jumping and Cross-Country Riding. Isabell Werth takes a part as an on-screen trainer, giving advice and pointers on how to ride and handle horses during training and eventing. Now out of print, the original websites can be seen at the Internet Archive Wayback machine, and the game itself is now available at Big Fish Games retitled – "Ride! Equestrian Simulation", with a French-man replacing Isabell as the trainer. Isabell's game character file is still in the data structure of the game, and using a patch still available, the game executable can be overwritten, converting it to the original German version, except for the German instructional audio which is missing.

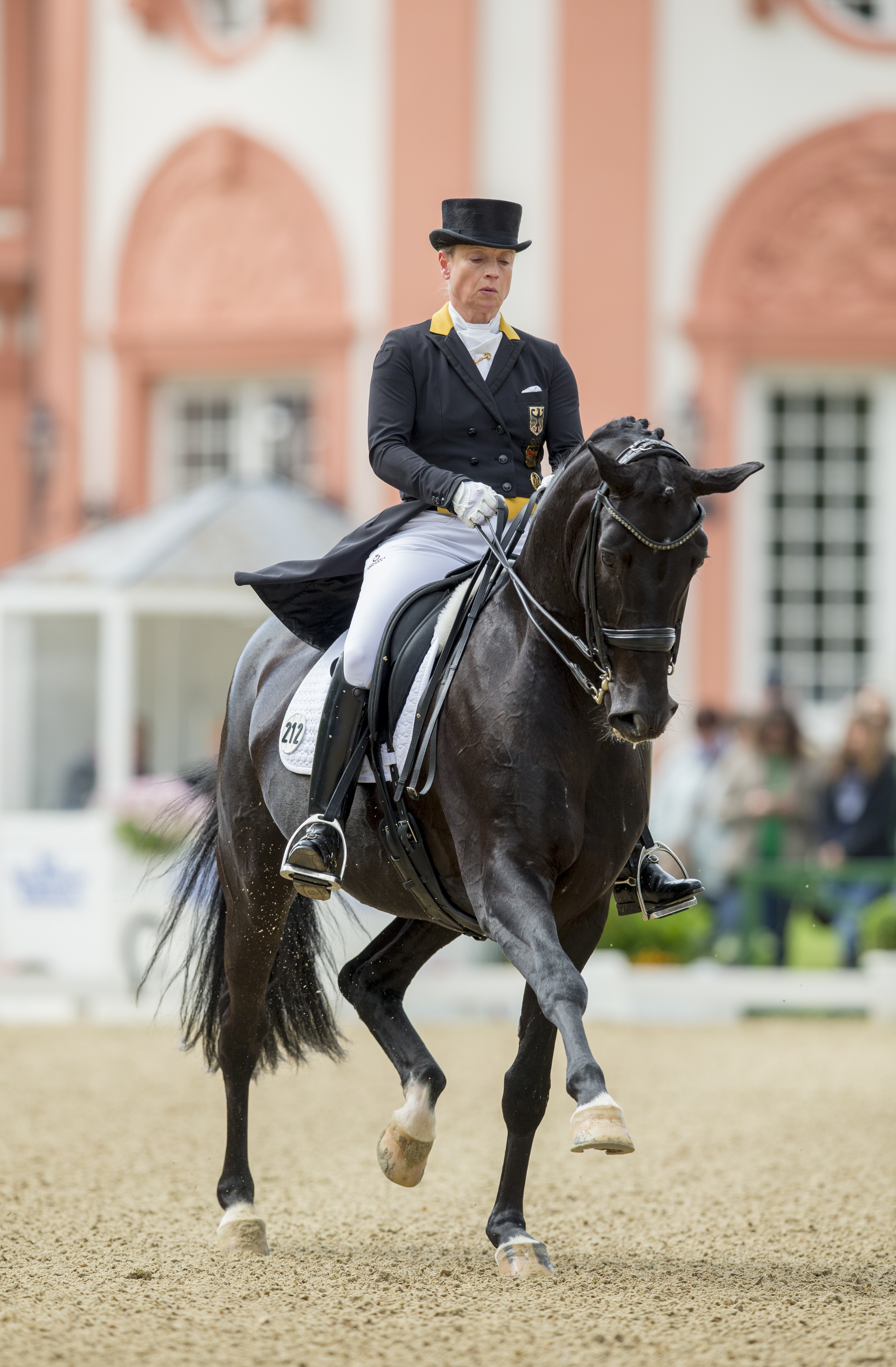
Isabell Werth competing Weihegold OLD

== International championship results ==
Results
Year	Event	Horse	Score	Placing	Notes
1989	European Championships	Weingart		13th	Individual
1991	European Championships	Gigolo FRH		1st place, gold medalist(s)	Team
1991	European Championships	Gigolo FRH		1st place, gold medalist(s)	Individual
1992	Olympic Games	Gigolo FRH		1st place, gold medalist(s)	Team
1992	Olympic Games	Gigolo FRH		2nd place, silver medalist(s)	Individual
1993	European Championships	Gigolo FRH		1st place, gold medalist(s)	Team
1993	European Championships	Gigolo FRH		1st place, gold medalist(s)	Individual
1996	Olympic Games	Gigolo FRH		1st place, gold medalist(s)	Team
1996	Olympic Games	Gigolo FRH		1st place, gold medalist(s)	Individual
1998	World Equestrian Games	Gigolo FRH		1st place, gold medalist(s)	Team
1998	World Equestrian Games	Gigolo FRH		1st place, gold medalist(s)	Individual
1999	European Championships	Antony FRH		1st place, gold medalist(s)	Team
1999	European Championships	Antony FRH		16th	Individual
2000	World Cup Final	Antony FRH		4th	
2000	Olympic Games	Gigolo FRH		1st place, gold medalist(s)	Team
2000	Olympic Games	Gigolo FRH		2nd place, silver medalist(s)	Individual
2001	World Cup Final	Antony FRH		2nd place, silver medalist(s)	
2001	European Championships	Antony FRH		1st place, gold medalist(s)	Team
2001	European Championships	Antony FRH		16th	Individual
2002	World Cup Final	Antony FRH		5th	
2003	World Cup Final	Antony FRH		4th	
2003	European Championships	Satchmo 78		17th	Individual
2004	World Cup Final	Apache OLD		9th	
2006	World Cup Final	Warum Nicht FRH		2nd place, silver medalist(s)	
2006	World Equestrian Games	Satchmo 78		1st place, gold medalist(s)	Team
2006	World Equestrian Games	Satchmo 78		1st place, gold medalist(s)	Individual Special
2006	World Equestrian Games	Satchmo 78		3rd place, bronze medalist(s)	Individual Freestyle
2007	World Cup Final	Warum Nicht FRH	84.250%	1st place, gold medalist(s)	
2007	European Championships	Satchmo 78	76.750%	2nd place, silver medalist(s)	Team
2007	European Championships	Satchmo 78	78.360%	1st place, gold medalist(s)	Individual Special
2007	European Championships	Satchmo 78	83.200%	2nd place, silver medalist(s)	Individual Freestyle
2008	World Cup Final	Warum Nicht FRH	82.600%	2nd place, silver medalist(s)	
2008	Olympic Games	Satchmo 78	76.417%	1st place, gold medalist(s)	Team
2008	Olympic Games	Satchmo 78	78.100%	2nd place, silver medalist(s)	Individual
2009	World Cup Final	Satchmo 78	84.500%	2nd place, silver medalist(s)	
2010	World Cup Final	Warum Nicht FRH	79.750%	4th	
2010	World Equestrian Games	Warum Nicht FRH	75.404%	3rd place, bronze medalist(s)	Team
2010	World Equestrian Games	Warum Nicht FRH	72.000%	10th	Individual Special
2010	World Equestrian Games	Warum Nicht FRH	80.000%	6th	Individual Freestyle
2011	World Cup Final	Satchmo 78	77.143%	5th	
2011	European Championships	El Santo NRW	75.213%	2nd place, silver medalist(s)	Team
2011	European Championships	El Santo NRW	76.533%	7th	Individual Special
2011	European Championships	El Santo NRW	80.536%	7th	Individual Freestyle
2012	World Cup Final	El Santo NRW	79.964%	4th	
2013	World Cup Final	Don Johnson FRH	80.429%	5th	
2013	European Championships	Don Johnson FRH	75.213%	1st place, gold medalist(s)	Team
2013	European Championships	Don Johnson FRH	71.890%	20th	Individual Special
2014	World Cup Final	El Santo NRW	79.089%	5th	
2014	World Equestrian Games	Bella Rose 2	81.529%	1st place, gold medalist(s)	Team
2014	World Equestrian Games	Bella Rose 2		31st	Individual Special
2015	World Cup Final	El Santo NRW	77.875%	6th	
2015	European Championships	Don Johnson FRH	74.900%	3rd place, bronze medalist(s)	Team
2015	European Championships	Don Johnson FRH	75.924%	7th	Individual Special
2015	European Championships	Don Johnson FRH	82.483%	4th	Individual Freestyle
2016	Olympic Games	Weihegold OLD	80.463%	1st place, gold medalist(s)	Team
2016	Olympic Games	Weihegold OLD	89.071%	2nd place, silver medalist(s)	Individual
2017	World Cup Final	Weihegold OLD	90.704%	1st place, gold medalist(s)	
2017	European Championships	Weihegold OLD	83.743%	1st place, gold medalist(s)	Team
2017	European Championships	Weihegold OLD	83.613%	1st place, gold medalist(s)	Individual Special
2017	European Championships	Weihegold OLD	90.982%	1st place, gold medalist(s)	Individual Freestyle
2018	World Cup Final	Weihegold OLD	90.658%	1st place, gold medalist(s)	
2018	World Equestrian Games	Bella Rose 2	84.824%	1st place, gold medalist(s)	Team
2018	World Equestrian Games	Bella Rose 2	86.246%	1st place, gold medalist(s)	Individual Special
2019	World Cup Final	Weihegold OLD	88.872%	1st place, gold medalist(s)	
2019	European Championships	Bella Rose 2	85.652%	1st place, gold medalist(s)	Team
2019	European Championships	Bella Rose 2	86.520%	1st place, gold medalist(s)	Individual Special
2019	European Championships	Bella Rose 2	90.875%	1st place, gold medalist(s)	Individual Freestyle
2021	Olympic Games	Bella Rose 2	83.298%	1st place, gold medalist(s)	Team
2021	Olympic Games	Bella Rose 2	89.657%	2nd place, silver medalist(s)	Individual Freestyle

== Notable horses ==
- Weingart – 1984 Chestnut Hanoverian Mare (Weinstock x Winkel)
  - 1989 European Championships – Team Gold Medal, Individual 13th Place
- Gigolo FRH – 1983 Chestnut Hanoverian Gelding (Graditz x Busoni XX)
  - 1991 European Championships – Team Gold Medal, Individual Gold Medal
  - 1992 Barcelona Olympics – Team Gold Medal, Individual Silver Medal
  - 1993 European Championships – Team Gold Medal, Individual Gold Medal
  - 1994 World Equestrian Games – Team Gold Medal, Individual Silver
  - 1996 Atlanta Olympics – Team Gold Medal, Individual Gold Medal
  - 1998 World Equestrian Games – Team Gold Medal, Individual Gold Medal
  - 2000 Sydney Olympics – Team Gold Medal, Individual Silver Medal
- Antony FRH – 1986 Dark Bay Hanoverian Gelding (Argument x Wenzel I)
  - 1999 European Championships – Team Gold Medal, Individual 16th Place
  - 2000 FEI World Cup Final – Fourth Place
  - 2001 FEI World Cup Final – Silver Medal
  - 2001 European Championships – Team Gold Medal, Individual 16th Place
  - 2002 FEI World Cup Final – Fifth Place
  - 2003 FEI World Cup Final – Fourth Place
- Satchmo 78 – 1994 Dark Bay Hanoverian Gelding (São Paulo x Legat)
  - 2003 European Championships – Team Gold Medal, Individual 17th Place
  - 2006 World Equestrian Games – Team Gold Medal, Individual Gold Medal, Individual Bronze Medal Freestyle
  - 2007 European Championships – Team Silver Medal, Individual Gold Medal, Individual Silver Medal Freestyle
  - 2008 Beijing Olympics – Team Gold Medal, Individual Silver Medal
  - 2009 FEI World Cup Final – Silver Medal
  - 2011 FEI World Cup Final – Fifth Place
- Apache OLD – 1993 Bay Oldenburg Gelding (Alabaster x Grundstein I)
  - 2004 FEI World Cup Final – Ninth Place
- Warum Nicht FRH – 1996 Chestnut Hanoverian Gelding (Weltmeyer x Wenzel I)
  - 2006 FEI World Cup Final – Silver Medal
  - 2007 FEI World Cup Final – Gold Medal
  - 2008 FEI World Cup Final – Silver Medal
  - 2010 FEI World Cup Final – Fourth Place
  - 2010 World Equestrian Games – Team Bronze Medal, Individual Tenth Place, Individual Sixth Place Freestyle
- El Santo NRW – 2001 Bay Rheinlander Gelding (Ehrentusch x Rythmus)
  - 2011 European Championships – Team Silver Medal, Individual Seventh Place, Individual Seventh Place Freestyle
  - 2012 FEI World Cup Final – Fourth Place
  - 2014 FEI World Cup Final – Fifth Place
  - 2015 FEI World Cup Final – Sixth Place
- Don Johnson FRH – 2001 Bay Hanoverian Gelding (Don Frederico x Warkant)
  - 2013 FEI World Cup Final – Fifth Place
  - 2013 European Championships – Team Gold Medal, Individual 20th Place
  - 2015 European Championships – Team Bronze Medal, Individual Seventh Place, Individual Fourth Place Freestyle
- Bella Rose 2 – 2004 Chestnut Westfalen Mare (Belissimo x Cacir AA)
  - 2014 World Equestrian Games – Team Gold Medal
  - 2018 World Equestrian Games – Team Gold Medal, Special Gold Medal
  - 2019 European Championships – Team Gold Medal, Special Gold Medal, Freestyle Gold Medal
- Weihegold OLD – 2005 Black Oldenburg Mare (Don Schufro x Sandro Hit)
  - 2016 Rio Olympics – Team Gold Medal, Individual Silver Medal
  - 2017 FEI World Cup Final – Gold Medal
  - 2017 European Championships – Team Gold Medal, Individual Gold Medal, Individual Gold Medal Freestyle
  - 2018 FEI World Cup Final – Gold Medal
  - 2019 FEI World Cup Final – Gold Medal

== See also ==
- List of multiple Olympic gold medalists in one event
- List of multiple Summer Olympic medalists
