= Philippe Mull =

French eventing rider

Personal information
- Born: 12 November 1964 (age 61)
Medal record
Equestrian
Representing France
World Championships
Silver medal – second place	1998 Rome	Team eventing

Philippe Mull (born 12 November 1964) is a French eventing rider. He won a team silver medal at the 1998 World Equestrian Games, where he also placed 21st in the individual event aboard Viens du Frêne.
