= Steffen Peters =

American equestrian

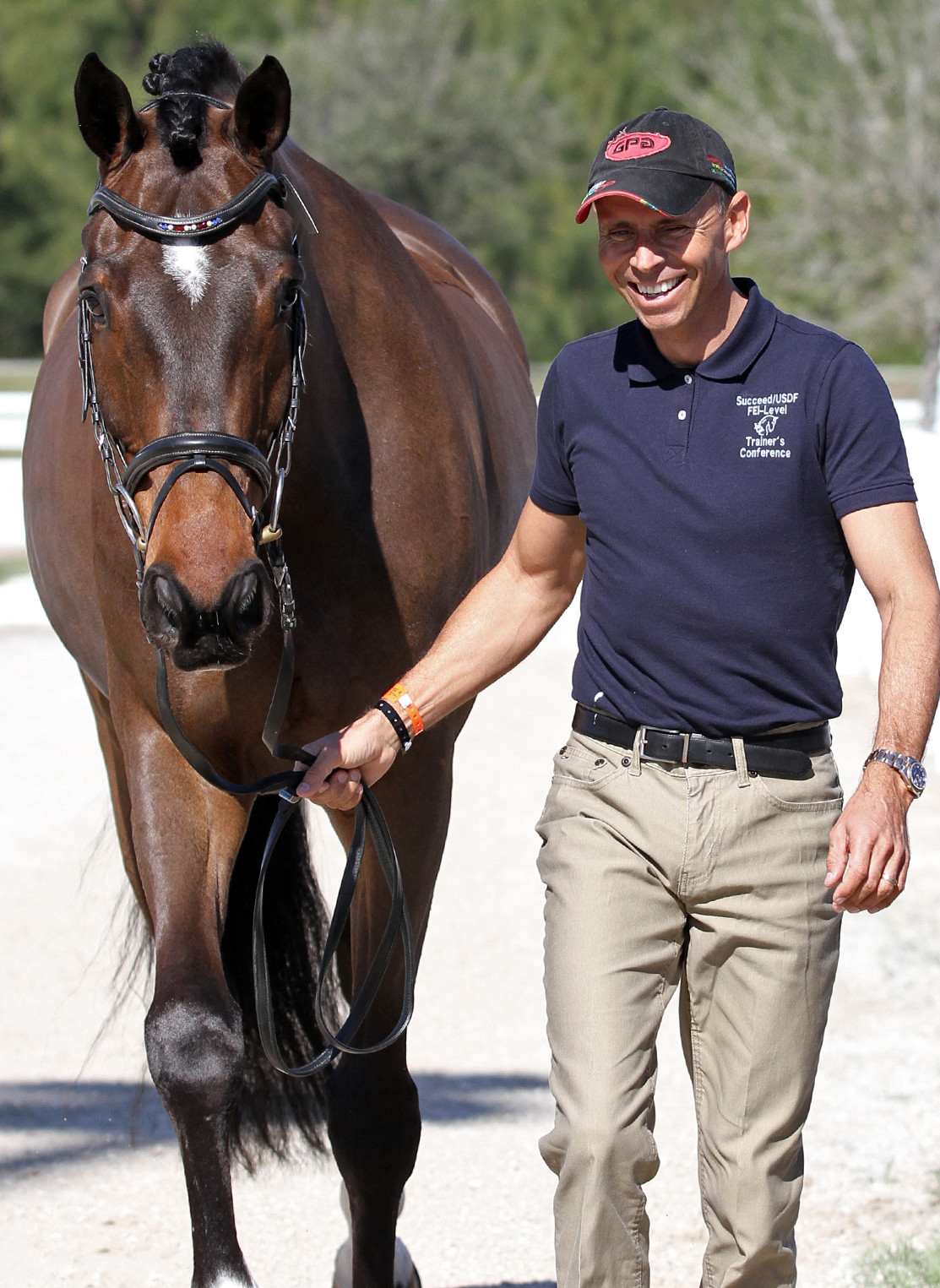
- Peters and Legolas in 2013

Personal information
- Nationality: American
- Discipline: Dressage
- Born: September 18, 1964 (age 61); Wesel, West Germany
- Height: 5 ft 8 in (173 cm)
Medal record
Equestrian
Representing the United States
Olympic Games
Silver medal – second place	2020 Tokyo	Team dressage
Bronze medal – third place	1996 Atlanta	Team dressage
Bronze medal – third place	2016 Rio de Janeiro	Team dressage
World Championships
Silver medal – second place	2018 Tryon	Team dressage
Bronze medal – third place	2006 Aachen	Team dressage
Bronze medal – third place	2010 Kentucky	Spécial dressage
Bronze medal – third place	2010 Kentucky	Freestyle dressage
World Cup
Gold medal – first place	2009 Las Vegas	Individual dressage
Bronze medal – third place	2007 Las Vegas	Individual dressage
Pan American Games
Gold medal – first place	2011 Guadalajara	Individual dressage
Gold medal – first place	2011 Guadalajara	Team dressage
Gold medal – first place	2015 Toronto	Individual dressage
Gold medal – first place	2015 Toronto	Team dressage

Steffen Peters (born September 18, 1964) is a German-born equestrian who competes for the United States in dressage. He has participated in five Olympic Games, winning a team bronze medal on two occasions (1996 and 2016) and a team silver medal once (2020). Peters has been successful in numerous other international competitions, including winning team bronze at the 2006 World Equestrian Games, two individual bronze medals at the 2010 World Equestrian Games and individual and team gold medals at both 2011 and 2015 Pan Am Games. The horse upon which he won many of his titles, Ravel, was retired in 2012. After 2012, his international successes came on Legolas. At the beginning of 2017, Peters handed over the ride on Legolas to his assistant rider Dawn White-O'Connor. Peters is currently working with a new international competition horse, Rosamunde.

== Personal life ==
Peters was born in Wesel, North Rhine-Westphalia, West Germany. He began riding at age seven, and competing in weekend dressage shows. By 15, he was competing outside of Germany, at international competitions in Belgium and Denmark. He received his first horse, Udon, at age 16 as a gift from his father; this horse would carry him to a bronze medal in the 1996 Summer Olympics. In 1984, he spent the summer training in San Diego, California, before returning to Germany to perform his army service. In 1985, he returned to the United States with Udon. In 1991, he opened his own barn and acquired his first sponsor, Lila Kommerstad, who purchased Udon and as of 2012 owned a portion of Peters' Arroyo Del Mar training barn. Peters gained his US citizenship in 1992, saying, "The whole idea of being so patriotic, of feeling so close to one's country makes a difference. There are not too many other countries where the people are so patriotic. I really enjoy this about America." Peters continues to live in the San Diego area with his wife, Shannon. Their large dressage barn is home to approximately 65 horses as of 2012, around half of which the couple trains and the other half of which are in training under other riders. Outside of his competition and training schedule, he teaches in around 30 training seminars each year. His staff call him "a machine" with regard to his training and competition schedule, and in addition to riding, he participates in swimming, cycling and tennis.

== Competitive career ==
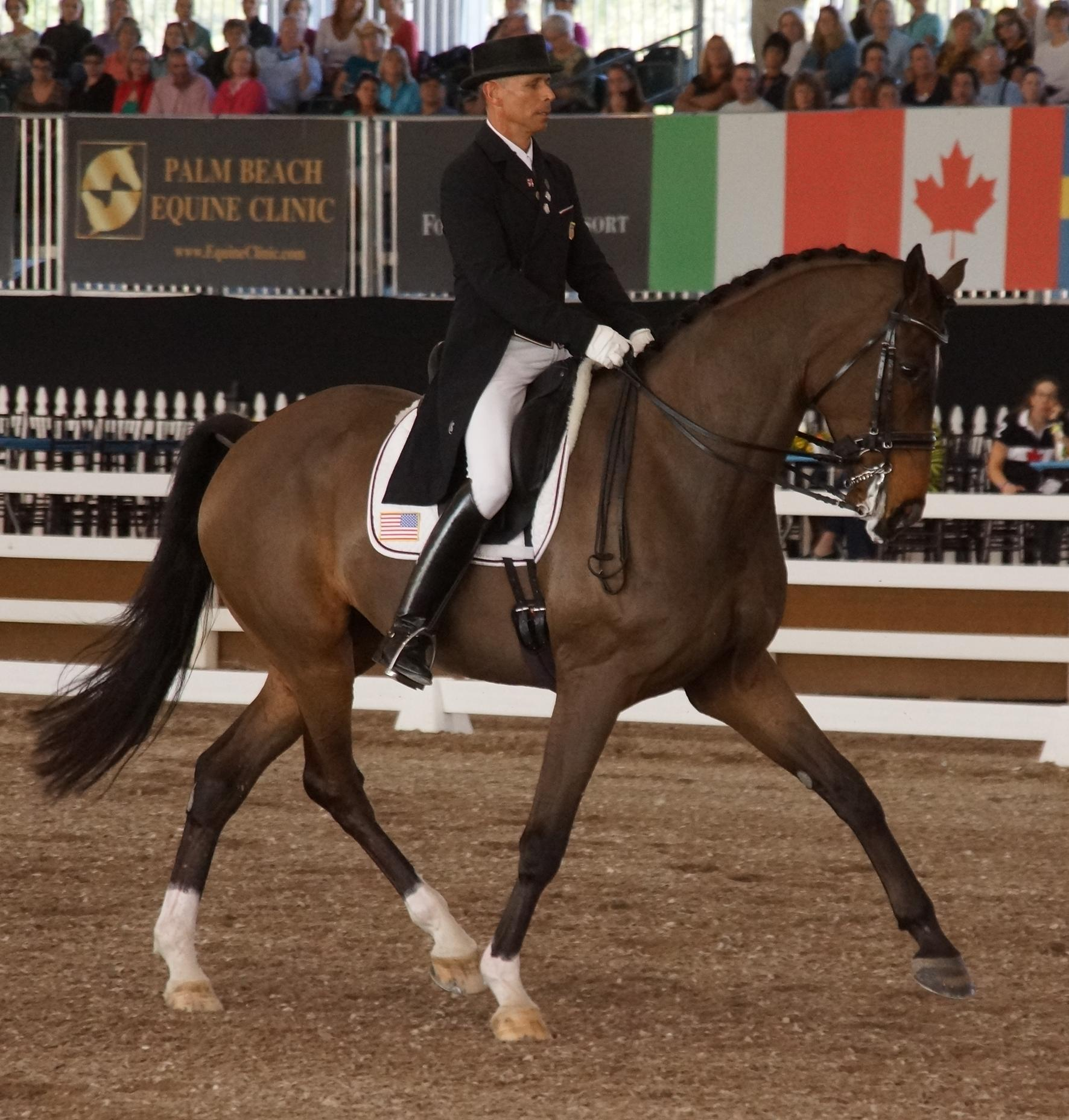
Peters riding Legolas at the CDI 5* West Palm Beach 2013

Peters' show record before the 1992 Summer Olympics made him a hopeful to compete for the US team. However, his citizenship papers were not processed in time to compete in the Olympic trials, and so he did not compete in Barcelona. Peters won his first Olympic medal when he rode with the US dressage team to a bronze medal at the 1996 Summer Olympics in Atlanta, together with Robert Dover, Michelle Gibson and Guenter Seidel. Peters, riding Floriano, was an alternate for the US team at the 2004 Summer Olympics, and did not compete. In 2006, with an aging Floriano, Peters and the US team won bronze at the 2006 World Equestrian Games. Soon after, he began riding TC Ravel, who would become his most successful horse. Despite being gelded while in quarantine after his shipment from the Netherlands and suffering an injury in 2007 that prevented training, Ravel carried Peters to a qualification for the 2008 Summer Olympics. In individual dressage competition at the Games, Peters placed fourth, riding Ravel. The US team finished fourth at the 2008 Games, but was disqualified after team member Courtney King's horse tested positive for felbinac, a banned substance. In 2009, Peters and Ravel had the highest scores in all three portions of the prestigious German Aachen World Equestrian Festival Grand Prix competition, leading them to be the first American pair to be named the Aachen Grand Prix Champions.

Ravel and Peters went on to win the 2009 World Cup Final, two bronze medals in individual competition at the 2010 World Equestrian Games, and be twice named the US Grand Prix Dressage Champions. In 2009, The Chronicle of the Horse named Peters and Ravel Horse and Horseman of the Year, and the United States Equestrian Federation (USEF) named Ravel as Horse of the Year. At the time, the Chronicle called him a "natural athlete with a balanced seat and an inherent understanding of the horse. He's calm under pressure and has a reputation for having ice water in his veins." In 2011, riding Weltino's Magic, he took gold in both the team and individual dressage events at the 2011 Pan Am Games. At the 2012 Summer Olympics he came 17th in the individual dressage and was part of the US team which came 6th, again riding Ravel. Peters retired Ravel from competition after the 2012 Olympic Games, after over 40 Grand Prix wins, and the same year the horse was inducted into the United States Dressage Federation Hall of Fame.

Following Ravel's retirement, Legolas became Peter's main competition horse. The pair went on to compete at the 2014 World Equestrian Games in Normandy, France. Peters placed 10th in both of the individual events and 4th in the team dressage competition. At the beginning of 2015, he participated at the Dressage World Cup finals in Las Vegas. Peters was however eliminated because of blood on Legolas' side. Later that year he participated at the 2015 Pan Am Games, where he successfully defended both of his gold medals from 2011.

As of 2017, Peters' main international competition horse is Rosamunde.

Peters is the first person to be awarded the USEF's Equestrian of the Year Award three times, having won the honor in 2008, 2009 and 2011.

== International championship results ==
Results
Year	Event	Horse	Score	Placing	Notes
1996	Olympic Games	Udon		3rd place, bronze medalist(s)	Team
1996	Olympic Games	Udon		15th	Individual
2002	World Cup Final	Grandeur		8th	
2006	World Equestrian Games	Floriano	75.843%	3rd place, bronze medalist(s)	Team
2006	World Equestrian Games	Floriano		4th	Individual Special
2006	World Equestrian Games	Floriano		6th	Individual Freestyle
2007	World Cup Final	Floriano	77.800%	3rd place, bronze medalist(s)	
2008	Olympic Games	Ravel	74.150%	4th	Individual
2009	World Cup Final	Ravel	84.950%	1st place, gold medalist(s)	
2010	World Equestrian Games	Ravel	75.596%	4th	Team
2010	World Equestrian Games	Ravel	78.542%	3rd place, bronze medalist(s)	Individual Special
2010	World Equestrian Games	Ravel	84.900%	3rd place, bronze medalist(s)	Individual Freestyle
2011	Pan American Games	Weltino's Magic		1st place, gold medalist(s)	Team
2011	Pan American Games	Weltino's Magic		1st place, gold medalist(s)	Individual
2012	Olympic Games	Ravel	77.705%	6th	Team
2012	Olympic Games	Ravel	77.286%	17th	Individual
2014	World Equestrian Games	Legolas 92	75.843%	4th	Team
2014	World Equestrian Games	Legolas 92	75.742%	10th	Individual Special
2014	World Equestrian Games	Legolas 92	77.321%	10th	Individual Freestyle
2015	World Cup Final	Legolas 92		EL	
2015	Pan American Games	Legolas 92	77.240%	1st place, gold medalist(s)	Team
2015	Pan American Games	Legolas 92	80.075%	1st place, gold medalist(s)	Individual
2016	Olympic Games	Legolas 92	77.614%	3rd place, bronze medalist(s)	Team
2016	Olympic Games	Legolas 92	79.393%	12th	Individual
2017	World Cup Final	Rosamunde	75.879%	9th	
2018	World Equestrian Games	Suppenkasper	73.494%	2nd place, silver medalist(s)	Team
2018	World Equestrian Games	Suppenkasper	69.073%	28th	Individual Special
EL = Eliminated
