= Michelle Gibson =

American equestrian (born 1969)

Personal information
- Full name: Lois Michelle Gibson
- Born: February 25, 1969 (age 57)
Medal record
Equestrian
Representing the United States
Olympic Games
Bronze medal – third place	1996 Atlanta	Team dressage

Michelle Gibson (born February 25, 1969) is an American equestrian. She won a bronze medal in team dressage at the 1996 Summer Olympics in Atlanta, together with Robert Dover, Steffen Peters and Guenter Seidel. She placed fifth in individual dressage at the 1996 Summer Olympics.
