= Finn Hansen =

Danish equestrian

Personal information
- Nationality: Danish
- Born: 4 March 1955 (age 70)

Sport
- Sport: Equestrian

Finn Hansen (born 4 March 1955) is a Danish equestrian. He competed in the individual dressage event at the 1996 Summer Olympics.
