= Equine shivers =

Neuromuscular disease of horses

Shivers, or equine shivering, is a rare, progressive neuromuscular disorder of horses. It is characterized by muscle tremors, difficulty holding up the hind limbs, and an unusual gait when the horse is asked to move backwards. Shivers is poorly understood and no effective treatment is available at this time.

== Presentation ==
Most horses with shivers are tall (average affected horse is 17 hands), and they are more commonly male (3:1 ratio of males to females). Shivers is most often seen in Warmbloods, draft horse breeds, and Thoroughbreds, but has also been reported in light harness horses, hacks, Quarter Horses, and other light horse breeds.

== Pathogenesis ==
The cause of shivers is currently unknown. Horses with shivers have been shown to have degeneration of the axons of their cerebellar Purkinje cells, although Purkinje cell number remains normal.

The strong breed predilection suggests a genetic basis to the disease. Despite some similarities in breed prevalence, there is no evidence to suggest a link between equine shivers and equine polysaccharide storage myopathy (PSSM).

== Clinical signs ==
Clinical signs usually are present before the age of 5 years old, and slowly progress throughout the horse's lifetime. Affected horses display muscle tremors of the hindquarters, hind limbs, and tail, and a spastic gait when they are asked to back up. Typical signs of shivers include:

- Farriery problems (96% of cases)
- Muscle twitching/trembling (85%)
- Elevated tail head (74%)
- Muscle atrophy (44%)
- Reduced strength (33%)
- Exercise intolerance (33%)
- Facial twitching (19%)

Clinical signs may be unilateral or bilateral, continuous or intermittent. They often worsen with excitement, stress, when the animal is asked to move on slippery surfaces, or during prolonged periods of standing. While shivers is classically associated with the hind end, horses may also occasionally show spasmodic contraction of the muscles of the head and neck, including twitching of the ears and lips, and rapid blinking. Rarely, horses will show a spastic gait in the front limbs in which the leg is held in full extension or with the knee flexed, with trembling occurring in the upper limb.

Despite histologic changes in the cerebellum, horses with shivers do not show clinical signs typical of cerebellar disease (ataxia, intention tremors). There are usually no changes on serum biochemistry profile, including measurements of muscle enzymes (CK and AST).

=== Progression of the disease ===
In mild cases, shivers may present only when the horse is asked to move backwards, usually seen as trembling in the muscles of the hind limbs and sudden, upward jerks of the tail. Affected animals may also snatch up their foot when asked to lift it for cleaning.

More severely affected horses will produce a backward gait where the hind legs are lifted abnormally high, held abducted for a period of time at the height of flexion, before the limb is slowly extended and the foot is placed on the ground. This pause may last for seconds to several minutes, during which time there is spasming of the muscles of the hind limb and tail, leading to trembling ("shivers"). Similar signs may be seen when the horse is asked to simply lift a hind foot, or during farriery work, especially when the foot is hammered during shoeing. Horses may progress to a point where they show hyperflexion and abduction of the hind limbs for a few steps after being asked to move forward or turn. In advanced cases, the horse may be unable to move backwards.

Although most horses are usually clinically normal when standing, some may stand rigidly with the hind legs in full extension behind their body, heels lifted, supporting their weight only on their toes. Others may intermittently flex and abduct their hind legs, with associated muscle spasms, when asked to stand still for long periods. Severely affected animals become weak, develop muscle atrophy in the hind limbs, and may fall or become reluctant to lie down when confined.

== Treatment and prognosis ==
There is currently no known effective treatment, although additional dietary vitamin E and selenium is often added following diagnosis.

In the early stages of disease, horses with shivers are commonly used as riding and driving animals. However, the disease is often slowly progressive. Muscle spasms usually increase in frequency and severity, and the animal becomes weak, develops muscle wasting, and may become very uncomfortable. The horse may become unable to hold its feet up for trimming by a farrier, although use of alpha-2 agonist drugs, such as xylazine or detomidine, has proven helpful in reducing signs during farriery visits. Eventually, euthanasia is often elected due to poor quality of life for the animal.

== See also ==
- Equine polysaccharide storage myopathy
- Stringhalt
- Cerebellar abiotrophy
