= Caroline Hatlapa =

Austrian equestrian

Personal information
- Nationality: Austrian
- Born: 2 May 1958 (age 66); Meerbusch, Germany

Sport
- Sport: Equestrian

Caroline Hatlapa (born 2 May 1958) is an Austrian equestrian. She competed in the individual dressage event at the 1996 Summer Olympics.
