= Joaquin Orth =

Mexican equestrian

Personal information
- Nationality: Mexican
- Born: 28 April 1955 (age 71)

Sport
- Sport: Equestrian
Medal record
Equestrian
Representing Mexico
Pan American Games
Bronze medal – third place	1987 Indianapolis	Team dressage
Bronze medal – third place	2003 Santo Domingo	Team dressage

Joaquin Orth (born 28 April 1955) is a Mexican equestrian. He competed in the individual dressage event at the 1996 Summer Olympics.
