= Gestion Bonfire =

Dutch Olympic horse

- Breed: Oldenburg
- Sire: Welt As (Oldenburg)
- Grandsire: Weltmeister (Hanoverian)
- Dam: Warine (Oldenburg)
- Maternal grandsire: Praefectus (Thoroughbred)
- Sex: Gelding
- Foaled: March 21, 1983
- Died: October 28, 2013 (aged 30)
- Country: Germany
- Colour: Bay
- Breeder: Karl Bernd Westerholt

Olympic medal record

Equestrian
Silver medal – second place	1992 Barcelona	Team dressage
Silver medal – second place	1996 Atlanta	Individual dressage
Silver medal – second place	1996 Atlanta	Team dressage
Gold medal – first place	2000 Sydney	Individual dressage
Silver medal – second place	2000 Sydney	Team dressage

Gestion Bonfire (March 21, 1983 – October 28, 2013), or Bonfire for short, was an Oldenburg gelding that competed in dressage with Dutch rider Anky van Grunsven. Between 1991 and 2000, the pair competed in multiple national and international championships, including three Olympic Games and two World Equestrian Games. They won one gold medal and four silver medals at the Olympics and one gold and three silvers at the World Equestrian Games. Although known for having a hot temperament, Bonfire mellowed as he aged, becoming one of Van Grunsven's best horses – until she found his replacement, Salinero, she did not think she would ever find a horse to match Bonfire's talent. A statue of Bonfire stands in Van Grunsven's home town of Erp.

== Early life ==
The brown Oldenburg gelding was born March 21, 1983, bred by Karl Bernd Westerholt of Lemwerder, Germany. His sire was Welt As and his dam was Warine (his dam's sire was Praefectus xx).

Van Grunsven first met Bonfire when he was two and a half years old, having been under saddle for only a week. He was later purchased by Van Grunsven's father. At first it appeared that the young horse would be a poor prospect, as his hot temperament led to poor gaits. However, he did well at learning advanced dressage moves such as the piaffe and passage, and so Van Grunsven continued to work with him. He improved, and by the time he was seven years old, he was competing at the Grand Prix level. His temperament continued to lead to difficult rides, and he had a tendency to spook at small items near the ring; these tendencies decreased as he grew older.

== Competitive career ==
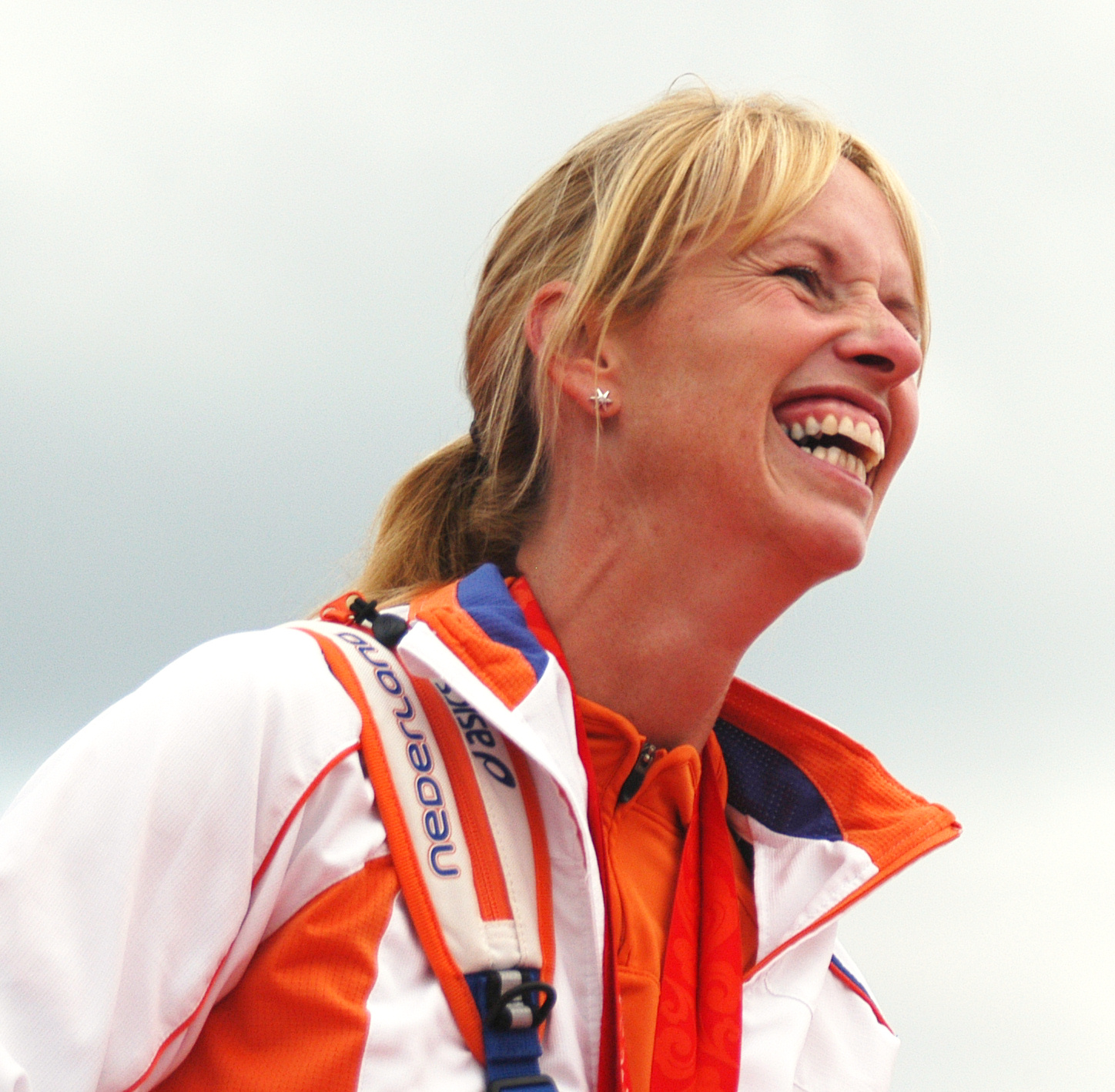
Anky van Grunsven in 2008

Bonfire competed with Van Grunsven at his first Olympic Games (her second Games) in 1992 at the Barcelona Games. There, the pair took 4th individually, while helping the Dutch team to a silver medal. At the 1996 Summer Olympics, they repeated the team performance, while improving to take an individual silver medal. In 2000, at the Sydney Games, the pair won their first (and only) individual gold, while helping the Dutch team to a third silver medal. After the Sydney Games, Van Grunsven replaced Bonfire with Salinero as her Olympic horse. Bonfire and Van Grunsven also competed in two World Equestrian Games. The first, the 1994 The Hague Games, resulted in two medals for the pair – an individual gold and a team silver. At the second, the 1998 World Equestrian Games in Rome, the pair took home both the individual and team silver. However, Van Grunsven considered the judging at this Games so poor that she said "I thought I would quit dressage."

In 1991, Bonfire made his European Dressage Championship debut at Donaueschingen, Germany, where he and Van Grunsven took an individual 5th, while assisting the Dutch team to a bronze medal. At the 1995 Championships in Mondorf, Luxembourg, the pair took the silver medal both individually and with the Dutch team. At the 1999 Championships at Arnhem, the Netherlands Bonfire and Van Grunsven took the title – gold in the individual – as well as assisting the Dutch team to another silver medal. He was also a nine-time national dressage champion in the Netherlands.

== Later life and legacy ==
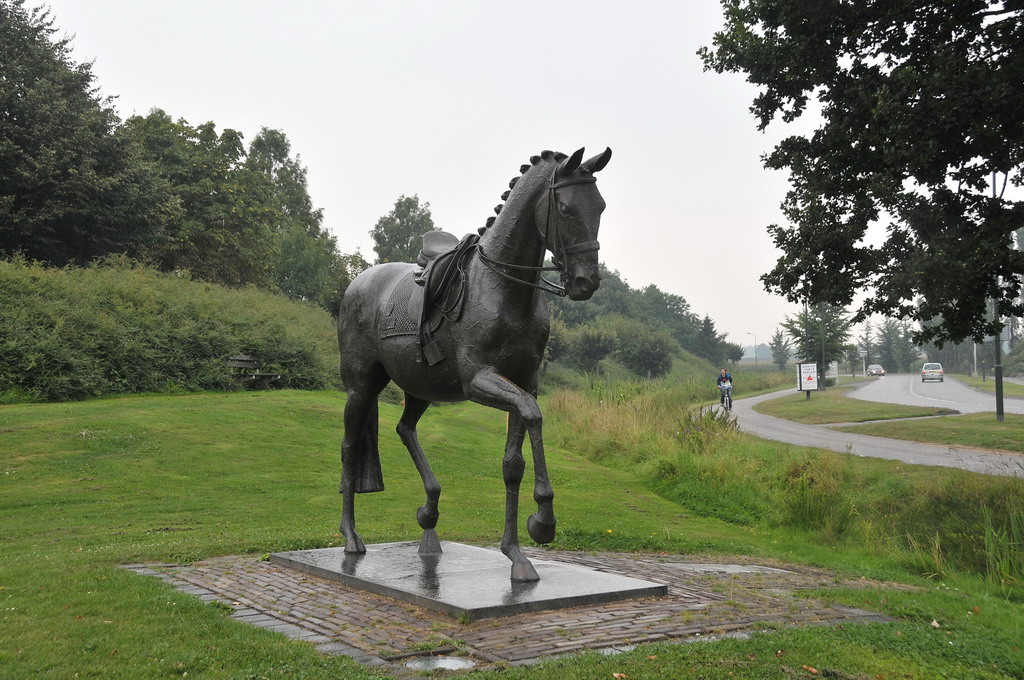
Statue of Gestion Bonfire in Erp

As he grew older, he retained his famed elasticity but show signed of age in other areas, especially at the walk, which was his weakest skill in the dressage ring. Bonfire was retired from competition after the 2000 Olympic Games. To celebrate his retirement, there was a ceremony in Van Grunsven's home town and a farewell ride at an international jumping competition in Maastricht, Netherlands. After Bonfire's retirement, Van Grunsven stated that she never thought she would find another horse as good as he was; however, his successor Salinero proved to be even more successful.

In Van Grunsven's home town of Erp there is a statue of Bonfire. As of 2012, he lived on Van Grunsven's farm in the Netherlands.

Bonfire was euthanized following adrenal disease and hoof inflammation on 28 October 2013, aged 30.
