= Leonie Bramall =

Canadian equestrian

Personal information
- Nationality: Canadian
- Born: 2 July 1963 (age 62) Vancouver, British Columbia, Canada

Sport
- Sport: Equestrian

Leonie Bramall (born 2 July 1963) is a Canadian equestrian. She competed in two events at the 1996 Summer Olympics.
