= 1998 FEI World Equestrian Games =

- Host city: Rome, Italy
- Nations: 42
- Events: 11 in 5 disciplines
- Opening: 1 October 1998
- Closing: 11 October 1998

The 1998 FEI World Equestrian Games were held in Rome, Italy from 1 to 11 October 1998. They were the 3rd edition of the games which are held every four years and run by the FEI.

== Events ==
11 events in 5 disciplines were held in Rome.

Dressage	Driving	Eventing	Jumping	Vaulting
Individual	Individual	Individual	Individual	Individual Female
Individual	Individual	Individual	Individual	Individual Male
Team	Team	Team	Team	Team

== Medal summary ==
=== Medalists ===
Event	Gold	Silver	Bronze
Individual dressage	Isabell Werth on Gigolo; Germany	Anky van Grunsven on Bonfire; Netherlands	Ulla Salzgeber on Rusty 47; Germany
Team dressage	Germany (GER); Isabell Werth on Gigolo; Karin Rehbein on Donerhall; Nadine Capellmann on Gracioso; Ulla Salzgeber on Rusty	Netherlands (NED); Anky van Grunsven on Bonfire; Coby van Baalen on Ferro; Ellen Bontje on Silvano; Gonnelien Rothenberger on Dondolo	Sweden (SWE); Louise Nathhorst on Walk On Top; Ulla Håkansson on Bobby; Annette Solmell on Strauss; Jan Brink on Bjorsell's Fontana
Individual driving	Ulrich Werner; Switzerland	Michael Freund; Germany	Ton Monhemius; Netherlands
Team driving	Netherlands (NED); Ton Monhemius; Ijsbrand Chardon; Harry de Ruyter	Germany (GER); Michael Freund; Christoph Sandmann; Helmet Rolfes	Sweden (SWE); Jan-Erik Pahlsson; Fredrik Persson; Tomas Eriksson
Individual eventing	Blyth Tait on Ready Teddy; New Zealand	Mark Todd on Broadcast News; New Zealand	Paula Törnqvist on Monaghan; Sweden
Team eventing	New Zealand (NZL); Blyth Tait on Ready Teddy; Mark Todd on Broadcast News; Vaughn Jefferis on Bounce; Sally Clark on Squirrel Hill	France (FRA); Marie-Christine Duroy on Summer Song; Rodolphe Scherer on Bambi de Brière; Jean-Lou Bigot on Twist de la Beige; Philippe Mull on Viens du Frêne	United States (USA); David O'Connor on Giltedge; Kerry Milikin on Out and About; Bruce Davidson Sr on Heyday; Karen O'Connor on Prince Panache
Individual jumping	Rodrigo Pessoa on Gandini Lianos; Brazil	Thierry Pomel on Thor des Chaines; France	Franke Sloothaak on San Patrignano Jolly; Germany
Team jumping	Germany (GER); Lars Nieberg on Loro Piana Esprit; Markus Beerbaum on Lady Weingard; Franke Sloothaak on San Patrignano Jolly; Ludger Beerbaum on P.S. Priamos	France (FRA); Alexandra Ledermann on Rochet; Roger-Yves Bost on Airborne Montecillo; Eric Navet on Atout d'Isigny; Thierry Pomel on Thor des Chaines	Great Britain (GBR); Diane Lampard on Abbervail Dream; Geoff Billington on It's Otto; Nick Skelton on Hopes are H. John Whitaker on Heyman
Men's vaulting	Devon Maitozo on Whisky; United States	Matthias Lang on Quitus du Madon; France	Henrik Ossenbrink on Panjano; Germany
Women's vaulting	Nadia Zülow on Rainbow; Germany	Kerith Lemon on Pasio; United States	Janine Oswald on Rainbow; Germany
Squad vaulting	Germany (GER)	Switzerland (SUI)	United States (USA)

=== Medal count ===
* Host nation (Italy)

Rank	Nation	Gold	Silver	Bronze	Total
1	Germany (GER)	5	2	4	11
2	New Zealand (NZL)	2	1	0	3
3	Netherlands (NED)	1	2	1	4
4	United States (USA)	1	1	2	4
5	Switzerland (SUI)	1	1	0	2
6	Brazil (BRA)	1	0	0	1
7	France (FRA)	0	4	0	4
8	Sweden (SWE)	0	0	3	3
9	Great Britain (GBR)	0	0	1	1
Totals (9 entries)		11	11	11	33

== Officials ==
Appointment of (Olympic disciplines) officials is as follows:

Dressage

- (Belgium) Mariette Withages (Ground Jury President)
- (Netherlands) Francis Verbeek (Ground Jury Member)
- (United States) Linda Zang (Ground Jury Member)
- (Italy) Adalberto Boetti (Ground Jury Member)
- (Germany) Volker Moritz (Ground Jury Member)
