= Evi Strasser =

Canadian equestrian

Personal information
- Nationality: Canadian
- Born: 13 February 1964 (age 62) Inzell, Germany

Sport
- Sport: Equestrian
Medal record
Equestrian
Representing Canada
Pan American Games
Silver medal – second place	2003 Santo Domingo	Team dressage

Evi Strasser (born 13 February 1964) is a Canadian equestrian. She competed in two events at the 1996 Summer Olympics.

In February 2024, Strasser and her daughter were provisionally suspended by Equestrian Canada on allegations of horse abuse. The FEI suspended Strasser following response by Equestrian Canada and opened their own investigation into the abuse allegations. In November 2024, the FEI reinstated the suspension of Strasser.

On November 10, 2026, in a final abuse decision, the FEI has fined and suspended Evi Strasser until late 2028.
