= Martin Schaudt =

German equestrian (born 1958)

Personal information
- Born: 7 December 1958 (age 67) Balingen, Baden-Württemberg, West Germany
Medal record
Equestrian
Representing Germany
Olympic Games
| Gold medal – first place | 1996 Atlanta | Team dressage |
| Gold medal – first place | 2004 Athens | Team dressage |
European Championships
| Gold medal – first place | 1995 Mondorf | Team dressage |

Martin Schaudt (born 7 December 1958 in Balingen, Baden-Württemberg) is a German equestrian and Olympic champion. He won a gold medal in team dressage at the 1996 Summer Olympics in Atlanta with the team from Germany.

He also received a gold medal with the German team in 2004.
