= Juan Matute =

Spanish equestrian

Personal information
- Nationality: Spanish
- Born: 16 January 1961 (age 64); Bilbao, Spain

Sport
- Sport: Equestrian

Juan Matute (born 16 January 1951) is a Spanish equestrian. He competed at the 1988 Summer Olympics, the 1992 Summer Olympics and the 1996 Summer Olympics.
