= Jane Gregory =

British equestrian (1959–2011)

Personal information
- Born: 30 June 1959; Bromley, Kent, England
- Died: 1 April 2011 (aged 51); Great Cheverell, Wiltshire, England

Sport
- Country: Great Britain
- Sport: Equestrian

Jane Gregory (née Jane Bredin 30 June 1959 – 1 April 2011), was an international equestrian. She first rode for her country in 1994, competing in the World Equestrian Games of that year, and competed for Great Britain in Dressage at the Atlanta and Beijing Olympic Games.

== Early life ==
Born in Bromley, Kent, Gregory came from a non-equestrian family. At the age of seven she started to learn to ride, going weekly to a riding centre near her home in Cornwall. Her first horse was a Connemara pony called Timolin, and was bought for her by her godmother for £175. She joined the North Cornwall Pony Club, winning the junior section of club's championships in 1976.

== International career ==
Her international career started in 1994. In that year she competed in the World Equestrian Games. She rode at the Atlanta Olympics 1996 with her horse Cupido. For several years after this she did not compete internationally due to horse injuries, but by 2001 she was first in the small tour rankings. She made a full comeback in 2006, when she won grand prix and grand prix special with the horse Lucky Star at Munich CDI in May, then she won the grand prix freestyle at the Mariakalnok CDI.

Her last coach was Ulla Salzgeber. She competed in Dressage for Team GB at the Beijing Olympics, stating "I am in a state of shock" upon finding out that she was selected. She was a member of the GB dressage team along with Laura Bechtolsheimer and Emma Hindle.

== Personal life ==
Based from Great Cheverell, Wiltshire, in 2006 Jane married her partner of twenty years, Hong Kong dressage rider Aram Gregory. Gregory died on 1 April 2011 after suffering a heart attack at the age of 51.

== Results ==
Games	Age	Sport	Event	Team	Position
Atlanta Olympics Summer 1996	37	Equestrianism	Mixed Dressage, Individual	Great Britain	42
Atlanta Olympics Summer 1996	37	Equestrianism	Mixed Dressage, Team	Great Britain	8
Beijing Olympics Summer 2008	49	Equestrianism	Mixed Dressage, Individual	Great Britain	30
Beijing Olympics Summer 2008	49	Equestrianism	Mixed Dressage, Team	Great Britain	5
