= Lars Petersen =

Danish dressage rider

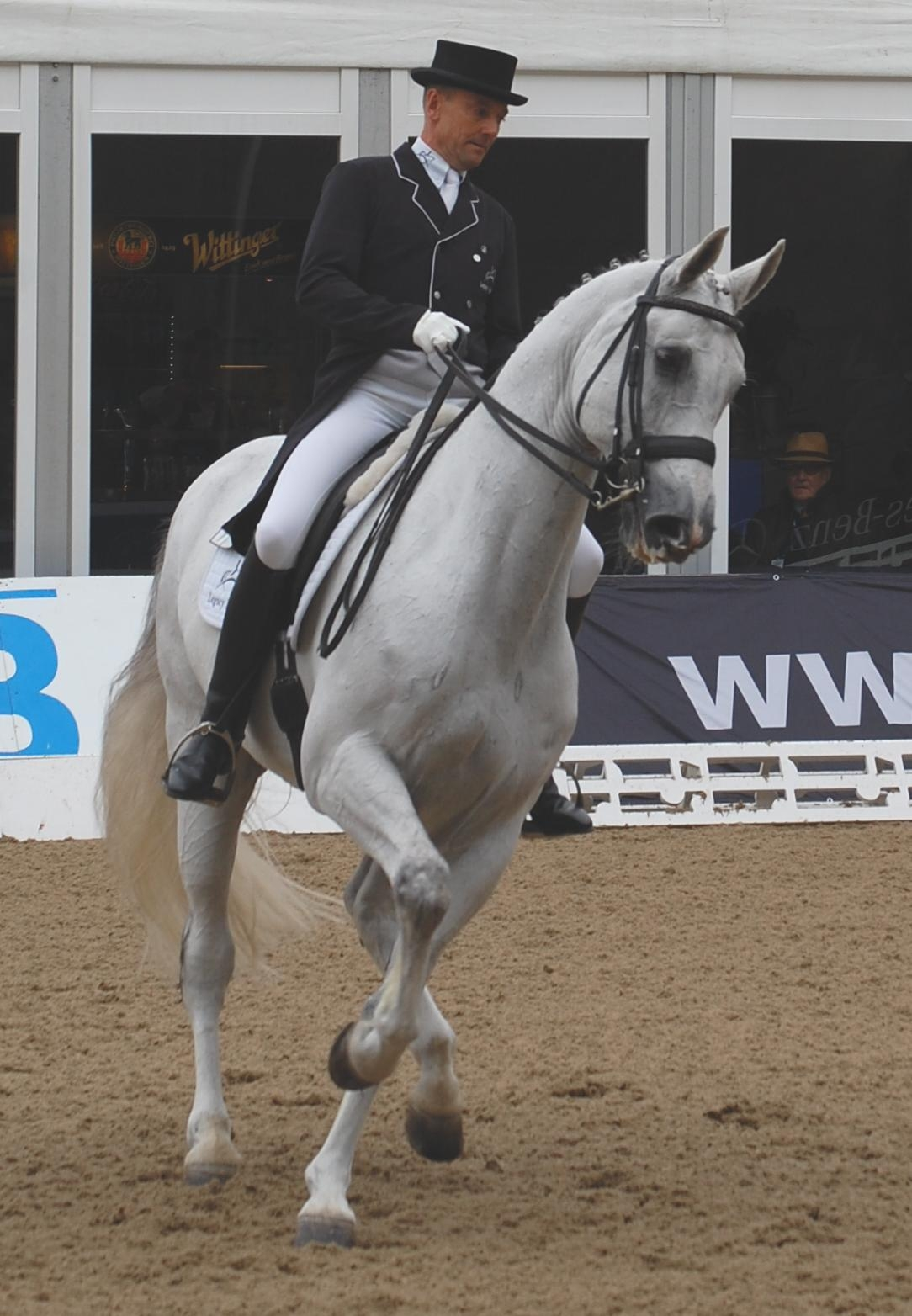
- Lars Petersen and Willano (2014)

Personal information
- Born: September 3, 1965 (age 60) Haderslev, Denmark
Medal record
Equestrian
Representing Denmark
European Championships
Bronze medal – third place	1999 Arnhem	Team dressage
Bronze medal – third place	2001 Verden	Team dressage
Dressage World Cup
Silver medal – second place	2002 Den Bosch	Individual dressage

Lars Petersen (born 3 September 1965 in Haderslev) is a Danish-born dressage rider, who has been competing internationally for the United States since 2017. He competed for Denmark at the 1996 Summer Olympics, where he placed 12th in the individual dressage competition. He won two bronze medals at the European Championships in team dressage.

At the 2002 FEI Dressage World Cup Final in 's-Hertogenbosch, he finished 2nd with a score of 79.670% on his horse Cavan. He has also qualified for the 2014 Dressage World Cup Final in Lyon, France, after winning the North American League. He was forced to withdraw, however, after his horse sustained a hoof injury.
