= Arlette Holsters =

Belgian equestrian

Personal information
- Nationality: Belgian
- Born: 21 June 1961 (age 63); Deurne, Belgium

Sport
- Sport: Equestrian

Arlette Holsters (born 21 June 1961) is a Belgian equestrian. She competed in the individual dressage event at the 1996 Summer Olympics.
