= Eva Senn =

Swiss equestrian

Personal information
- Nationality: Swiss
- Born: 24 October 1952 (age 72); Solothurn, Switzerland

Sport
- Sport: Equestrian

Eva Senn (born 24 October 1952) is a Swiss former equestrian. She competed in two events at the 1996 Summer Olympics.
