= Marie-Hélène Syre =

French equestrian

Personal information
- Nationality: French
- Born: 5 March 1958 (age 68) Rouen, France

Sport
- Sport: Equestrian
Medal record
Equestrian
Representing France
European Championships
| Bronze medal – third place | 1995 Mondorf | Team dressage |

Marie-Hélène Syre (born 5 March 1958) is a French equestrian. She competed in two events at the 1996 Summer Olympics.
