= Vicky Thompson =

British equestrian

Personal information
- Nationality: British
- Born: 10 June 1971 (age 53); Crawley, England

Sport
- Sport: Equestrian

Vicky Thompson (born 10 June 1971) is a British equestrian. She competed in two events at the 1996 Summer Olympics.
