= Heike Holstein =

Irish equestrian (born 1971)

Personal information
- Full name: Heike Holstein
- Nationality: Irish
- Born: 10 December 1971 (age 54) Dublin, Ireland

Sport
- Country: Ireland
- Sport: Equestrian

Heike Holstein (born 10 December 1971) is an Irish equestrian. She competed at the 1996 Summer Olympics, the 2000 Summer Olympics, the 2004 Summer Olympics and the 2020 Summer Olympics.

In 2019 the Irish dressage team qualified for the first time in history a team for the Olympic Games. Due the postponement of the Olympic Games, some of the Irish team members fell out and the Irish Equestrian Federation decided not to send a team to Tokyo. Instead Holstein represented Ireland individually at the 2020 Olympic Games for the fourth time in her career. She competed aboard the home-bred mare Sambuca finishing in 37th place.

Heike's family is closely involved in the equestrian sport. Her mother Gisela Holstein is a horse trainer and an international dressage judge. Her brother Erik Holstein competed in showing and rein classes. Heike herself was a pupil of Reiner Klimke.
