= Gigolo FRH =

German sport horse

- Breed: Hanoverian
- Sire: Graditz (Hanoverian)
- Grandsire: Grande (Hanoverian)
- Dam: Bunette (Hanoverian)
- Maternal grandsire: Busoni (Thoroughbred)
- Sex: Gelding
- Foaled: 1983
- Died: 2009
- Country: Germany
- Colour: Liver Chestnut
- Breeder: Horst Klussmann

Gigolo FRH
Medal record

Summer Olympics
Gold medal – first place	1992 Barcelona	Team dressage
Gold medal – first place	1996 Atlanta	Individual dressage
Gold medal – first place	1996 Atlanta	Team dressage
Gold medal – first place	2000 Sydney	Team dressage
Silver medal – second place	1992 Barcelona	Individual dressage
Silver medal – second place	2000 Sydney	Individual dressage

World Championships
Gold medal – first place	1994 The Hague	Individual dressage
Gold medal – first place	1994 The Hague	Team dressage
Gold medal – first place	1998 Rome	Individual dressage
Gold medal – first place	1998 Rome	Team dressage

European Championships
Gold medal – first place	1991 Donaueschingen	Special dressage
Gold medal – first place	1991 Donaueschingen	Team dressage
Gold medal – first place	1993 Lipica	Special dressage
Gold medal – first place	1993 Lipica	Team dressage
Gold medal – first place	1995 Mondorf	Individual dressage
Gold medal – first place	1995 Mondorf	Team dressage
Gold medal – first place	1997 Verden	Individual dressage
Gold medal – first place	1997 Verden	Team dressage

Gigolo FRH (1983 – 23 September 2009) was a liver chestnut Hanoverian gelding, ridden for Germany by Isabell Werth in dressage competitions. During their competition career, the pair won four gold and two silver medals at Olympic games, four world championships, eight European championships, and four German championships. Gigolo was euthanized in 2009 after being injured, but is known today as history's most successful dressage horse.

== Early life ==
The liver chestnut Hanoverian gelding was bred in 1983 by Horst Klussmann. His sire was Graditz and his dam was Bunett (his dam's sire was Busoni xx). In 1989, Werth's then-trainer Uwe Schulten-Baumer purchased Gigolo.

== Competitive career ==
Gigolo and Werth competed in their first Olympic Games in 1992 at the Barcelona Games. There, the pair took an individual silver, while helping the German team to a gold medal. At the 1996 Summer Olympics in Atlanta, they repeated the team performance, while improving to take the individual gold medal. In 2000, at the Sydney Games, the helped the German team to a third gold medal, while again taking the individual silver. After the Sydney Games, Werth replaced Gigolo with Satchmo as her Olympic horse, although the pair didn't compete until the 2008 Games. Gigolo and Werth also competed in two World Equestrian Games. The first, the 1994 The Hague Games, resulted in both individual and team gold for the pair, as did the second, the 1998 Rome Games.

In 1991, Gigolo made his European Dressage Championship debut at Donaueschingen, Germany, where he and Werth took both individual and team gold. They repeated this double gold feat three times – in 1993 at Lipica, Slovenia; in 1995 at Mondorf, Luxembourg; and in 1997 at Verden, Germany. He was also a four-time national dressage champion in Germany. During his frequent musical kur performances, Gigolo was known for his elasticity – the pair's signature move was a transition from an extended canter directly to a pirouette.

Gigolo was officially retired at the Stuttgart German Masters competition on October 24, 2000.

== Legacy ==
On September 23, 2009, Gigolo was euthanized after being injured and experiencing a rapid decline in health. Werth described him as "my friend, schoolmaster and comrade. His reliability and willingness to work were two of his extraordinary traits." During his competitive career, he won 883,918 DM in prize money. Based on his monetary success and competition record, Gigolo is known as "the most successful dressage horse of all time."
