= Hans Staub =

Olympic dressage rider

Personal information
- Born: 21 March 1959 (age 67)

Hans Staub (born 21 March 1959) is a Swiss Olympic dressage rider. He competed at the 1996 Summer Olympics in Atlanta where he finished 6th with the Swiss team in team dressage and 27th in the individual dressage competition.

He also represented Switzerland at two European Dressage Championships (in 2011 and 2013) and one edition of the World Equestrian Games (in 2014).
