= Fausto Puccini =

Italian equestrian

Personal information
- Nationality: Italian
- Born: 4 November 1932; Rome, Italy
- Died: 1 April 2016 (aged 84); Rome, Italy

Sport
- Sport: Equestrian

Fausto Puccini (4 November 1932 – 1 April 2016) was an Italian equestrian. He competed at the 1976 Summer Olympics and the 1996 Summer Olympics.
