= Guenter Seidel =

American equestrian

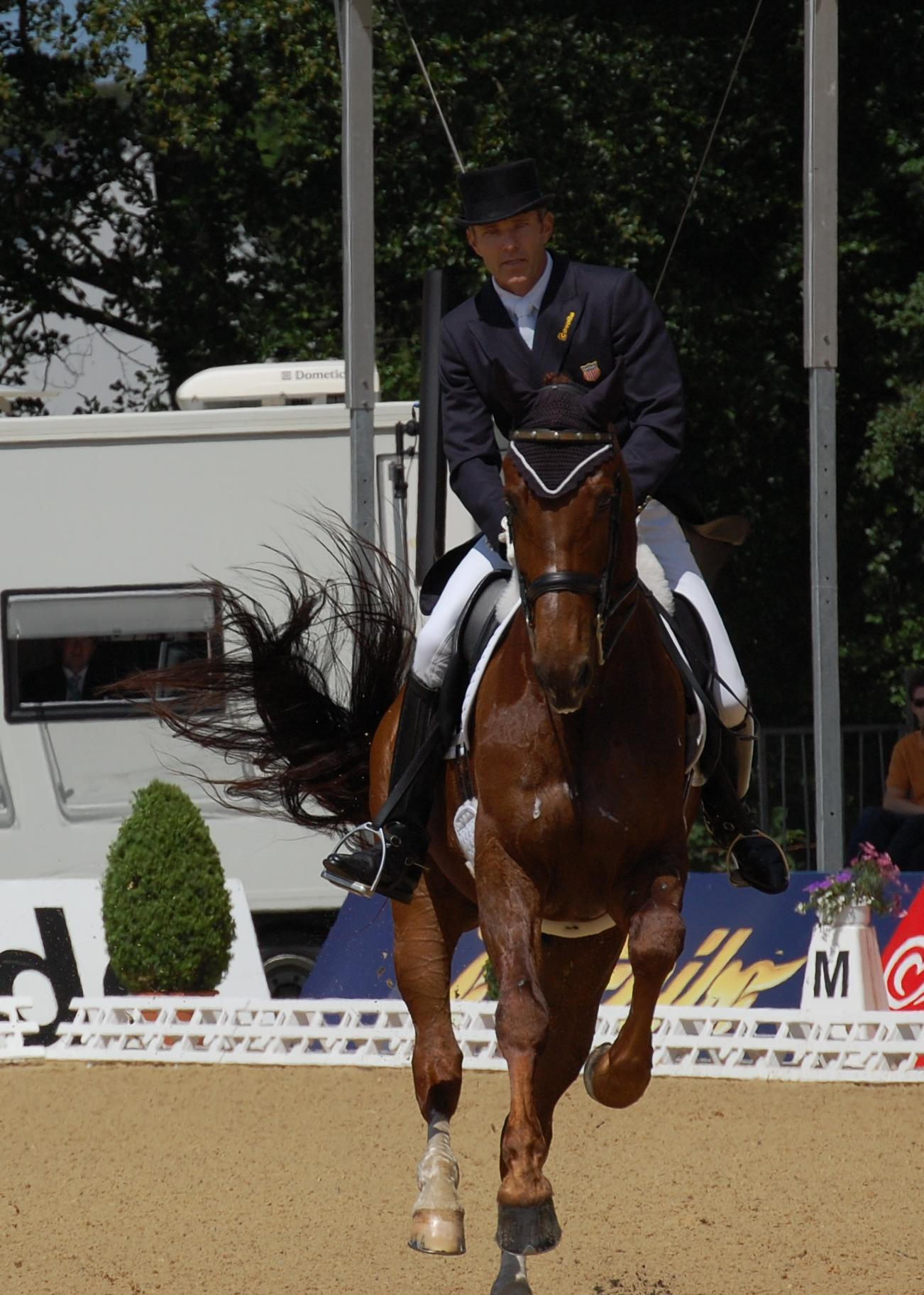

Personal information
- Born: 23 September 1960 (age 65) Fischen im Allgäu, Bavaria, West Germany
- Height: 1.87 m (6 ft 2 in)
- Weight: 79 kg (174 lb)
Medal record
Equestrian
Representing the United States
Olympic Games
Bronze medal – third place	1996 Atlanta	Team dressage
Bronze medal – third place	2000 Sydney	Team dressage
Bronze medal – third place	2004 Athens	Team dressage
World Championships
Silver medal – second place	2002 Jerez	Team dressage
Bronze medal – third place	2006 Aachen	Team dressage
Pan American Games
Silver medal – second place	1995 Mar del Plata	Team dressage

Guenter Seidel (born 23 September 1960) is an American equestrian. He was born in Bavaria, Germany, but represents the United States after moving to the country in 1985. He won a bronze medal in team dressage at the 1996 Summer Olympics in Atlanta, together with Robert Dover, Michelle Gibson and Steffen Peters. He also won bronze medals in team dressage at the 2000 Summer Olympics in Sydney, and at the 2004 Summer Olympics in Athens. He is openly gay.

== Notable horses ==
- Graf George – 1982 Gray Gelding
  - 1996 Atlanta Olympics – Team Bronze Medal, Individual Eighth Place
  - 1997 FEI World Cup Final – Eighth Place
  - 1998 World Equestrian Games – Team Fourth Place, Individual Eighth Place
- Foltaire – 1987 Bay Dutch Warmblood Gelding (Voltaire x Afrikaner)
  - 2000 Sydney Olympics – Team Bronze Medal
- Nikolas 7 – 1989 Bay Westfalen Gelding (Weinberg x Exponent)
  - 2002 World Equestrian Games – Individual 18th Place
  - 2003 FEI World Cup Final – Bronze Medal
  - 2004 FEI World Cup Final – Sixth Place
- Aragon – 1992 Gray Bavarian Gelding (Abydos x Lorenz)
  - 2004 Athens Olympics – Team Bronze Medal, Individual 14th Place
  - 2005 FEI World Cup Final – 12th Place
  - 2006 World Equestrian Games – Team Bronze Medal, Individual 13th Place Grand Prix, Individual 13th Place Freestyle
- Zero Gravity – 2004 Chestnut Dutch Warmblood Gelding (Royal Hit x Contango)
  - 2016 FEI World Cup Final – 18th Place
