= Richard Davison (equestrian) =

Olympic dressage rider

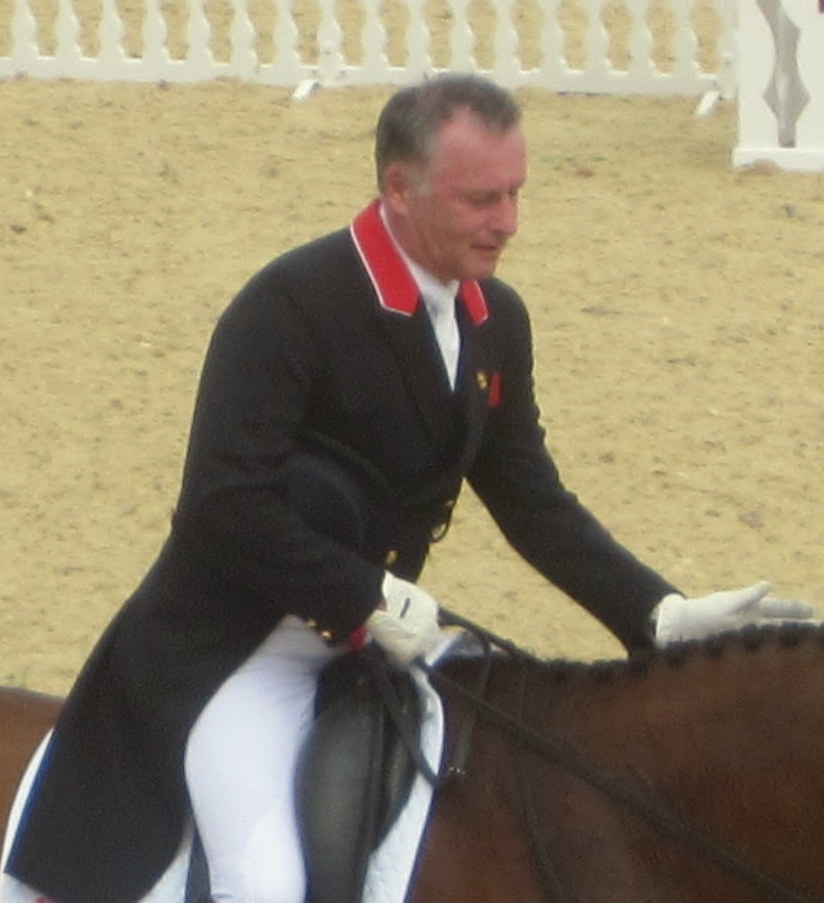
- Davison at the 2012 Olympics

Personal information
- Born: 20 September 1955 (age 70)
Medal record
Equestrian
Representing Great Britain
World Championships
| Silver medal – second place | 2022 Herning | Team dressage |
European Championships
| Silver medal – second place | 1993 Lipica | Team dressage |
| Bronze medal – third place | 2003 Hickstead | Team dressage |

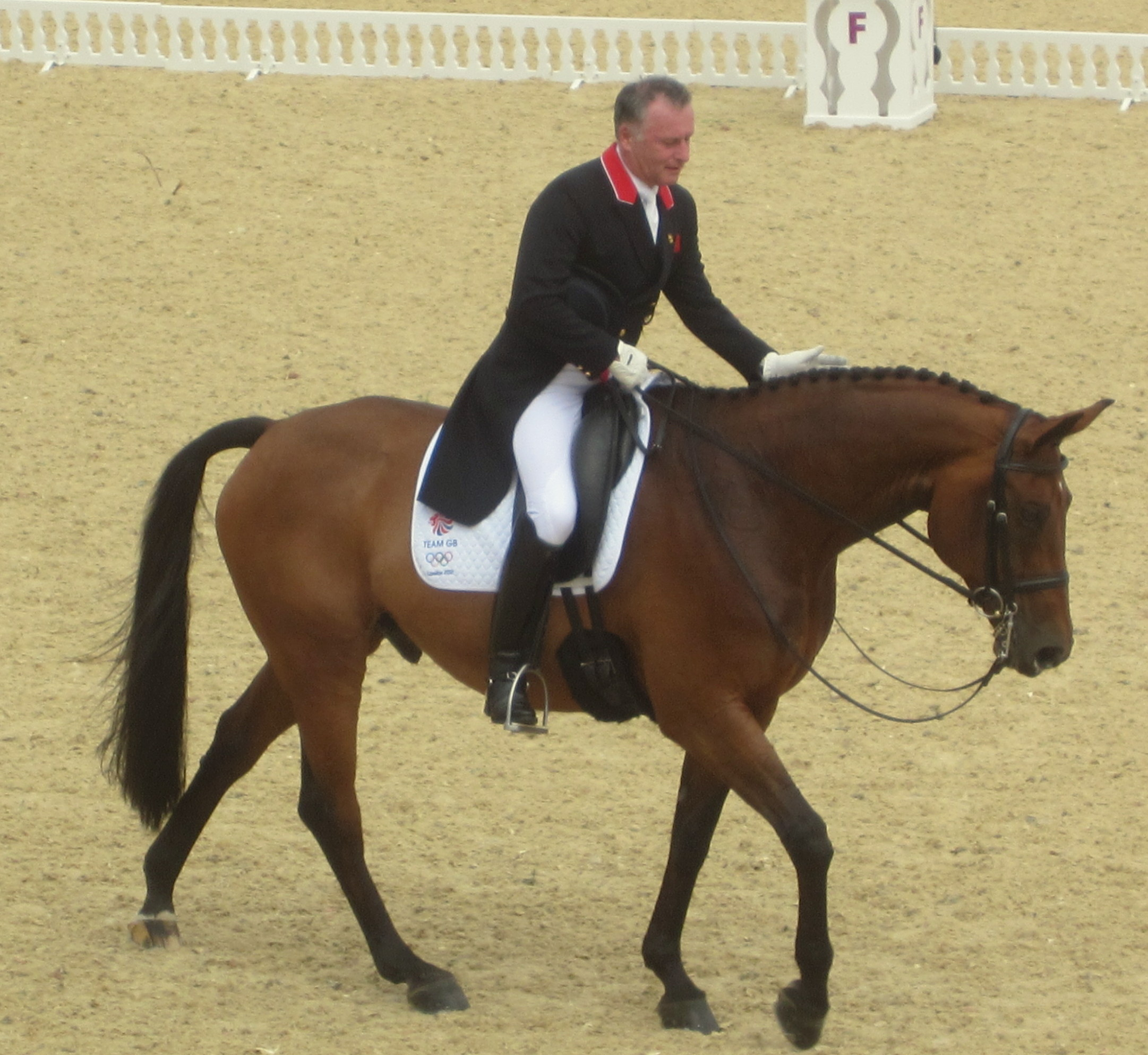
Davison at the 2012 Olympics

Richard Davison (born 20 September 1955) is an Olympic standard dressage rider.

Davison is a four-time Olympian having represented Great Britain at the Olympic Games in London in 2012, Athens in 2004, Sydney in 2000 and Atlanta in 1996. He was the British Team captain at the 2008 Summer Olympics in Beijing.

He is a World and European Championship team medallist. He remains one of Britain's most successful dressage competitors, having competed over four decades. He has made an extensive contribution to the sport during his career, not only as a rider, but also as a trainer and team manager. His knowledge and experience has helped steer dressage from being barely known among the general public to becoming the sport of the 'dancing horses' that Britain celebrated during London.

In 2022 he won team silver at the FEI World Championships on Bubblingh, a horse owned by Gwendolyn Sontheim and which he had bred out of a mare which he had also competed for her at the 2002 World Championships and on whom he had won team bronze at the 2003 European Championships.

He is the former British Dressage World Class Equestrian Programme Performance Manager and British Olympic Dressage Team Captain, and for many years was a coach to the British World Class Show Jumping Programme. He has been credited for 'masterminding the strategic plan behind Britain's most successful period of International successes' which resulted in the Dressage team's historic Olympic and European team gold medals and World Championship medals.

He has acted as a Board Member and moderator for The Global Dressage Forum at each event since its inception in 2001. The event provides a live forum for the global dressage community and has HRH Princess Benedikte of Denmark as its President.

Davison has been described as an eloquent and skilled moderator who is practised at combining firm control with humour when needed, and who keeps meetings on message and delegates engaged.

The six time Olympic medallist Carl Hester MBE describes Davison as 'A long-time friend, teammate and advisor' and like others credits him for 'masterminding the strategic plan behind Britain's most successful period of international success'.

From 1995 until 2003 Davison was a member of the International Equestrian Federation (FEI) Dressage Committee. In 2008 when the FEI President HRH Princess Haya Bint Hussein demanded that the entire committee should resign, on the grounds it did not fully represent the interests of the dressage community, Davison was appointed by the FEI Executive Board to the Ad Hoc Task Force which was established to replace the committee and to inject a new focus in the sport.

He was also a member of the FEI Dressage Judging Working Group established in 2015 to review International judging scoring systems and to make recommendations for improvement. The Working Group made nineteen recommendations when they presented their final report in 2018. One of Davison's roles was to seek input from a cohort of behavioural psychologists and visual cognition experts from Nottingham Trent University to evaluate and ease cognitive load involved in judging.

In 2010 he was also a member of the FEI Working Group tasked with expanding current guidelines for Stewards to facilitate clear implementation of the policy on warm-up techniques at FEI events. Among other things this was established to give stewards greater powers to sanction aggressive riding techniques.

He has a particular interest in law and has acted as an expert witness in high profile legal claims. He has worked as a consultant on a number of equine legal cases, and in August 2025 he was awarded a Masters of Law with Distinction from Liverpool John Moores University.

He is a member of the organising committee of the London International Horse Show and acts as technical advisor to a number of other competitions. He was a member of the founding group of the Burghley Young Event Horse series.

Davison has competed horses for high profile owners including Lord and Lady Bamford, HRH Princess Haya bint Hussein, Gwendolyn Sontheim and the Countess of Derby. In 2015, together with his younger son Joe, he was asked to present a dressage masterclass demonstrating his training methods to HM Queen Elizabeth II using Hiscox Artemis, the horse Davison rode for Lady Derby at the 2012 London Olympic Games.

The Countess of Derby arranged for Sir Elton John and Robbie Williams to give permission for Davison to ride to their music in his dressage freestyle programmes. The Royal Liverpool Philharmonic Orchestra recorded the compositions and the project was supported in part by The Foundation for Sport and the Arts.

Davison spent the early years of his career training and studying dressage in Vienna as a pupil of Arthur Kottas-Heldenberg, and also at the famous Spanish Riding School, considered to be the home of classical dressage, where he also had the honour of being accepted as a student.

During the COVID-19 pandemic Davison joined other equestrian personalities in Equestrian Relief, a fund raising initiative in support of NHS workers.

== Equine Welfare and Ethical Training ==
Davison champions the underpinning of equine training methods, together with the regulation of equestrian sport, with the use of science-based evidence.

He is a former Trustee and current ambassador of World Horse Welfare and a current Trustee of the British Horse Foundation.

He has been invited to present at a number of equine science meetings including those run by The Saddlery Research Trust, the British Horse Society, Liverpool University, The Reaseheath College, BEVA, and has co-chaired events for the International Society for Equestrian Science.

== Media Work ==
Over the years Davison has contributed regularly to a number of equestrian publications, and acted as a guest editor of Horse and Hound magazine with whom he was a long-time columnist. He has regularly commentated on TV. He has made a number of dressage training DVD's. He authored the book Dressage Priority Points published in 1996 and wrote the foreword to Brain, Pain or Training.

Between 2013 and 2017, together with Carl Hester MBE, he hosted The Dressage Convention. The duo used the weekend-long event to attempt to dispel the mysteries surrounding dressage training and make it fun and inclusive. In an effort to unite the classical dressage community with their own competition worlds they invited Sylvia Loch of The Classical Riding Club to join them.

More recently the duo of Hester and Davison have co-hosted Dressage Unwrapped at the London International Horse Show together with other International dressage celebrities.

Horse and Country television have featured Davison in a number of masterclasses and series including 'Daisy Dines With', a cooking and dining series hosted by Daisy Bunn where, alongside fellow Olympian Geoff Billington, he was a guest of Nina Barbour. Alice Plunket also featured Davison and his family in her series 'In the Frame'.

To the Reuters news agency in 2016 Davison described the world record holding champion dressage horse Valegro as the 'Muhammad Ali' of dressage, the greatest. He reiterated this at Valegro's official retirement ceremony at the London International Horse Show but went on to credit the influence of Valegro's rider Charlotte Dujardin and trainer Carl Hester by saying 'In my time in the sport - which is 40 years - I've never seen a horse like Valegro. Frankly he is the greatest, he is the Muhammad Ali of this sport. But he also needs a fantastic rider, and I think it is the alchemy between those three (Valegro, Charlotte Dujardin and Carl Hester), that has given us the privilege of watching the greatest combination together'.

== Honours and awards ==
Richard Davison is a former visiting fellow at Nottingham Trent University. In 2017 the university awarded him an Honorary Degree of Doctor of Science in recognition of his significant contribution to the world of equestrian sport.

He was awarded the Horse and Hound magazine 1996 Dressage Personality of the Year Award.

In 2009 he received the Horse of the Year Show Equestrian of the Year Award.

He was awarded the British Equestrian Federation Medal of Honour in recognition of activities connected with International endeavour.

He is a Fellow of the British Horse Society and a Fellow of the International Dressage Trainer Club.

Davison is holder of the FEI Gold Badge of Honour.

Since 1992 Davison's family have awarded the 'GW Davison Award' to British Dressage riders who perform with excellence when competing as part of the British team at a European or World Championships or Olympic Games. The award is intended to nurture and commend team spirit while competing at the highest levels.

== Personal life ==
Davison is married to fellow equestrian Gillian, and they have two sons. Their eldest son Tom is an international equestrian coach based in the USA and the EU. Their youngest son Joe is an International show jumper. Horse and Hound magazine featured his Staffordshire home asking, 'is this the most idyllic dressage yard in Britain?'
