= Ulla Håkanson =

Swedish equestrian

Ulla Håkansson
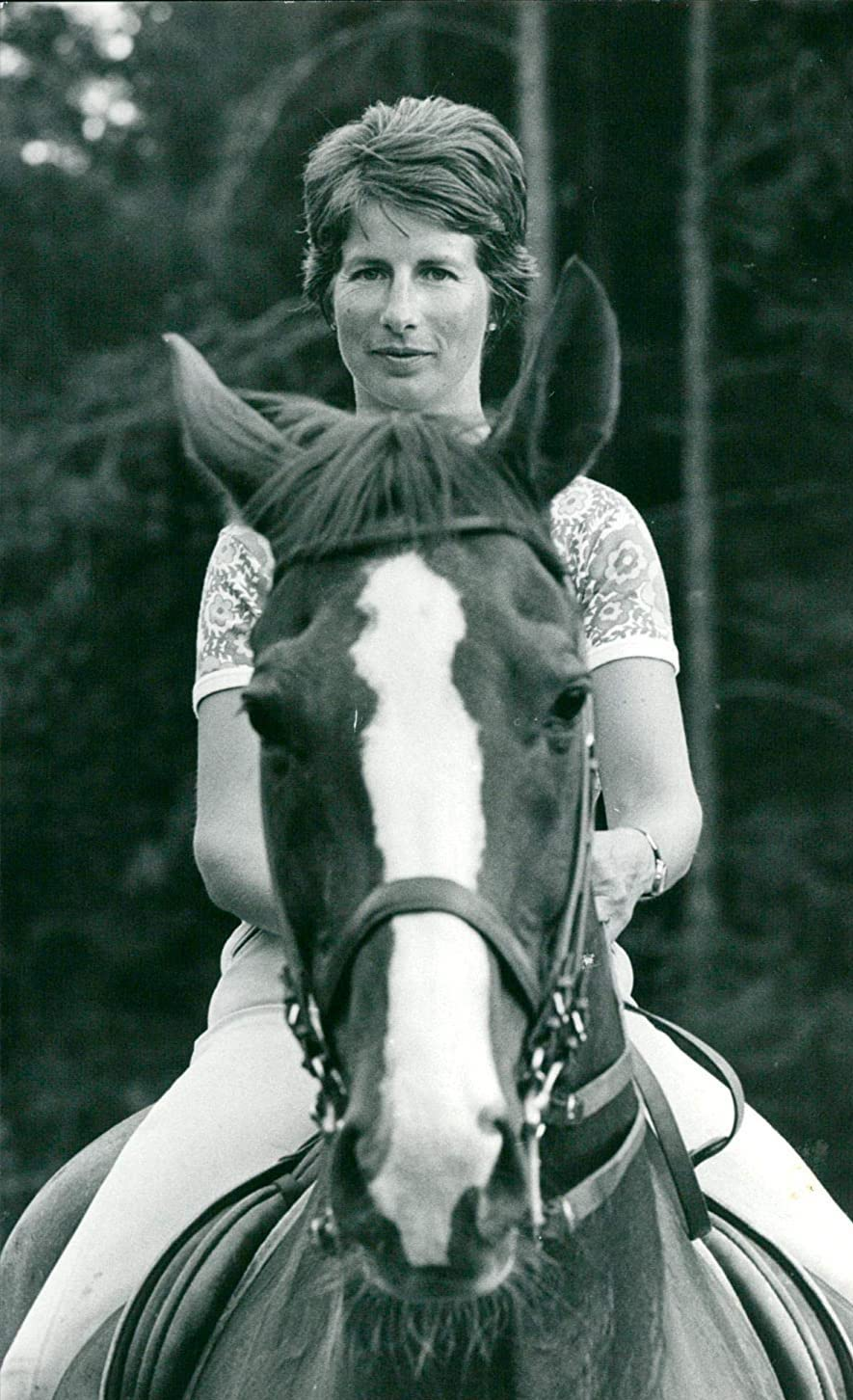
- Håkanson on Ajax in 1972

Personal information
- Nationality: Swedish
- Born: 9 November 1937 (age 88) Motala, Sweden

Sport
- Sport: Equestrian
- Club: Stockholms FRK (1972); Gärds Härads RF (1984–88); Helsingborgs FRK (1996)
Medal record
Equestrian
Representing Sweden
Olympic Games
Bronze medal – third place	1972 Munich	Team dressage
Bronze medal – third place	1984 Los Angeles	Team dressage
World Championships
Bronze medal – third place	1998 Rome	Team dressage
European Championships
Bronze medal – third place	1971 Wolfsburg	Team dressage
Bronze medal – third place	1997 Verden	Team dressage

Ulla Håkanson (also Håkansson, born 9 November 1937) is a Swedish equestrian. She won a bronze medal in dressage at the 1972 and 1984 Summer Olympics.

Håkanson started competing in show jumping and won the national titles in 1966 and 1967. At one competition, her horse Ajax was injured, and Håkanson switched from jumping to dressage, starting a long and successful career in this event: between 1970 and 2002 she won twelve gold, five silver and five bronze medals at the national championships. Internationally, she won team bronze medals at European championships in 1971 and 1997, at world championships in 1998, and at Olympic Games in 1972 and 1984. Individually she placed 6th in 1972, 12th in 1984, 11th in 1988 and 20th in 1996. She skipped the 1976 Games because Ajax died shortly before the competition, and at the 2000 Olympics she was part of the Swedish reserve. In 1971 she was awarded the Swedish Equestrian Medal of Honor and in 1988 she received a royal medal for her sports achievements.
