= Barbara von Grebel-Schiendorfer =

Swiss equestrian

Personal information
- Nationality: Swiss
- Born: 27 September 1950 (age 74); Zürich, Switzerland

Sport
- Sport: Equestrian

Barbara von Grebel-Schiendorfer (born 27 September 1950) is a Swiss equestrian. She competed in two events at the 1996 Summer Olympics.
