= Joanna Jackson (equestrian) =

British equestrian

Personal information
- Nationality: British
- Born: 26 February 1970 (age 55); Chatburn, England

Sport
- Sport: Equestrian

Joanna Jackson (born 26 February 1970) is a British equestrian. She competed in two events at the 1996 Summer Olympics.
