= Dominique Brieussel =

French equestrian

Personal information
- Nationality: French
- Born: 7 October 1962 (age 63) Enghien-les-Bains, France

Sport
- Sport: Equestrian
Medal record
Equestrian
Representing France
European Championships
Bronze medal – third place	1995 Mondorf	Team dressage

Dominique Brieussel (born 7 October 1962) is a French equestrian. He competed in two events at the 1996 Summer Olympics.
