= Annette Solmell =

Swedish equestrian

Personal information
- Nationality: Swedish
- Born: 1 July 1959 (age 66) Norrköping, Sweden

Sport
- Sport: Equestrian
Medal record
Equestrian
Representing Sweden
European Championships
| Bronze medal – third place | 1997 Verden | Team dressage |

Annette Solmell (born 1 July 1959) is a Swedish equestrian. She competed in two events at the 1996 Summer Olympics.
