= Robert Dover (equestrian) =

20th and 21st-century American equestrian

Personal information
- Born: June 7, 1956 (age 70) Chicago, Illinois, U.S.
Medal record
Equestrian
Representing United States
Olympic Games
Bronze medal – third place	1992 Barcelona	Team dressage
Bronze medal – third place	1996 Atlanta	Team dressage
Bronze medal – third place	2000 Sydney	Team dressage
Bronze medal – third place	2004 Athens	Team dressage
World Championships
Bronze medal – third place	1994 The Hague	Team dressage

Robert Jeffrey Dover (born June 7, 1956) is an American equestrian who has had international success in the sport of dressage. Riding from the age of 13, he began specializing in dressage at age 19 and competed in his first Olympics in 1984. He competed in every summer Games between 1984 and 2004, winning four team bronze medals. He also took a team bronze at the 1994 World Equestrian Games. Dover is the most honored dressage rider in the United States, and has been inducted to the United States Dressage Federation Hall of Fame. Outside of competition, Dover founded the Equestrian Aid Foundation in 1996 to assist others in the equestrian world, and hosted a TV show that searched for the next dressage star. From late 2009 to early 2011, Dover served as the Technical/Coach Advisor for the Canadian national dressage team. In April 2013, Dover was named Technical Advisor/Chef d'Equipe for the US national dressage team.

== Personal life ==
Dover, who is Jewish, was born in Chicago, Illinois to parents Herb and Jean Dover. He was given a horse for his Bar Mitzvah at 13 and was active in Pony Club, graduating at "A" level, the highest level. He decided to specialize in dressage when he was 19. Dover attended the University of Georgia. He is openly gay, and his partner is fellow rider Robert Ross. He became the first openly gay Olympic athlete when he came out in 1988. Injuries, including a torn rotator cuff and pinched sciatic nerve, began to plague him in the late 1990s, causing major back pain and reducing his ability to ride.

== Career ==
=== Competition ===
In 1984, Dover competed in his first Olympic Games at the age of 28. At the Los Angeles Games, he finished 17th individually, and the US team finished 6th. At the 1988 Seoul Olympics, he finished 13th, and the team tied for 6th place. In 1992, at the Barcelona Games, Dover tied for 22nd place, while the American team took the bronze medal. At the 1996 Atlanta Games, the 2000 Sydney Olympics and the 2004 Athina Games the United States dressage team took the bronze medal each time, while Dover finished 25th, 23rd and 6th respectively. He was elected team captain in all six Olympics in which he competed. Of his Olympic experience, Dover says, "The medals themselves aren't the important thing. My memories of the Games and of the entire Olympic experience are, to me, everything."

In 1987, Dover defeated Reiner Klimke, a six-time Olympic gold medalist, at the German Aachen Grand Prix freestyle competition. In doing so, he became the first American in 27 years to win that event. In 1994 he was named the US Olympic Male Equestrian Athlete of the Year, and in 1995 awarded the Whitney Stone Cup, given by the United States Equestrian Federation (USEF) for excellence in international competition. Dover has been named the USEF Dressage Champion five times, and ridden seven times in the FEI World Cup Final. In 1994, Dover rode with the United States dressage team at the World Equestrian Games, winning a team bronze. He was also amassed more than 100 Grand Prix victories. Overall, Dover has won more honors in dressage than any other rider from the United States. In 2009, Dover announced his retirement from competitive riding, instead choosing to focus on teaching and philanthropy.

=== Other ===
Dover founded the Equestrian Aid Foundation in 1996. The Foundation's mission is to financially assist members of the equestrian community who have suffered a catastrophic accident, injury or illness. In 2002, Dover was listed as one of the 50 most influential horsemen by Chronicle of the Horse magazine. In 2007, "The Search for America's Next Equestrian Star: Dressage", a reality TV show created and promoted by Dover, aired on the Fox Reality Channel with five one-hour episodes. The show followed a search for young, talented dressage riders, with the final five being allowed to train with Dover for one month before a winner was selected; the winner became Dover's assistant. In 2008, Dover was inducted into the United States Dressage Federation Hall of Fame. Dover served on the USEF Dressage Committee for many years, and spent eight years on the US Olympic Committee Athlete Advisory Council.

In late 2009, Dover was selected as a Technical/Coach Advisor for the Canadian dressage team, with a contract that extended through the 2010 World Equestrian Games in Lexington, Kentucky. After the Games, it was announced that Dover and the Canadian team had not been able to agree on contract renewal terms, but in late 2010 it was announced that Dover would remain as the interim trainer for the first quarter of 2011. In March 2011, German equestrian Markus Gribbe was hired, and Dover's term as a Canadian coach came to an end. Dover is known for his coaching abilities, with some of the best dressage riders with top international titles to their credit coming from his stables. During his time as a trainer for Canada, he was no longer be eligible to train top riders with the USEF. In April 2013, Dover was named Technical Advisor/Chef d'Equipe of the US national dressage team. He is expected to remain in the position through the 2016 Summer Olympics. Dover is currently a rider and trainer at Stillpoint Farm in Florida.

== See also ==
- List of athletes with the most appearances at Olympic Games
- List of select Jewish equestrians
