= Equestrian at the 1984 Summer Olympics – Individual dressage =

Equestrian at the Olympics

Individual dressage at the Games of the XXIII Olympiad
- Venue: Santa Anita Racetrack
- Date: 8–10 August 1984
- Competitors: 43 from 18 nations

Medalists
1st place, gold medalist(s)		Reiner Klimke	West Germany
2nd place, silver medalist(s)		Anne Grethe Jensen	Denmark
3rd place, bronze medalist(s)		Otto Hofer	Switzerland

The individual dressage event was one of six equestrian events on the Equestrian at the 1984 Summer Olympics programme. The competition was held at the Santa Anita Racetrack in Arcadia, California.

The competition was split into two phases:

1. Qualifying round (8–9 August)
  Riders performed the Grand Prix test. The twelve riders with the highest scores advanced to the final.
2. Final (10 August)
  Riders performed the Grand Prix Special test.

== Results ==
Rank	Rider	Horse	Qualifying		Final
Rank	Rider	Horse	Points	Rank	Points
1st place, gold medalist(s)	Reiner Klimke (FRG)	Ahlerich	1797	1	1504
2nd place, silver medalist(s)	Anne Grethe Jensen (DEN)	Marzog	1701	2	1442
3rd place, bronze medalist(s)	Otto Hofer (SUI)	Limandus	1609	3	1364
4	Ingamay Bylund (SWE)	Aleks	1582	7	1332
5	Herbert Krug (FRG)	Muscadeur	1576	9	1323
6	Uwe Sauer (FRG)	Montevideo	1582	7	1279
6	Christopher Bartle (GBR)	Wily Trout	1547	11	1279
8	Annemarie Sanders-Keyzer (NED)	Amon	1591	5	1271
9	Christine Stückelberger (SUI)	Tansanit	1606	4	1257
10	Christilot Boylen (CAN)	Anklang	1540	12	1237
11	Elisabeth Max-Theurer (AUT)	Acapulco	1556	10	1214
12	Ulla Håkansson (SWE)	Flamingo	1589	6	1197
13	Tineke Bartels (NED)	Ducci	1539	13	Did not advance
14	Hilda Gurney (USA)	Keen	1530	14	Did not advance
15	Alojz Lah (YUG)	Maestoso Monteaura	1523	15	Did not advance
16	Sandy Pflueger-Clarke (USA)	Marco Polo	1516	16	Did not advance
17	Robert Dover (USA)	Romantico	1513	17	Did not advance
18	Margit Otto-Crépin (FRA)	Crapici	1512	18	Did not advance
19	Kyra Kyrklund (FIN)	Nor	1504	19	Did not advance
20	Bonny Chesson (CAN)	Satchmo	1496	20	Did not advance
20	Torben Ulsø Olsen (DEN)	Patricia	1496	20	Did not advance
20	Dušan Mavec (YUG)	Favory Mera	1496	20	Did not advance
23	Jane Bartle-Wilson (GBR)	Pinocchio	1489	23	Did not advance
24	Dominique d'Esmé (FRA)	Fresh Wind	1484	24	Did not advance
25	Eva Maria Pracht (CAN)	Little Joe	1467	25	Did not advance
26	Louise Nathhorst (SWE)	Inferno	1459	26	Did not advance
27	Amy-Cathérine de Bary (SUI)	Aintree	1458	27	Did not advance
28	Jo Rutten (NED)	Ampere	1456	28	Did not advance
29	Peter Ebinger (AUT)	Malachit	1434	29	Did not advance
30	Jennie Loriston-Clarke (GBR)	Prince Consort	1427	30	Did not advance
31	Christa Winkel (AUT)	Richelieu	1401	31	Did not advance
32	Marie-Louise Castenskiold (DEN)	Stradivarius	1377	32	Did not advance
33	Stojan Moderc (YUG)	Maestoso Allegra	1362	33	Did not advance
34	Cristobal Egerstrom (MEX)	Metternich	1361	34	Did not advance
35	Mariam Cunningham (PER)	Eldorado	1317	35	Did not advance
36	Margarita Nava (MEX)	Pentagon	1316	36	Did not advance
37	Libby Hernández (PUR)	Rocco	1305	37	Did not advance
38	Osamu Nakamata (JPN)	Medina	1271	38	Did not advance
39	Manuel Cid (MEX)	Civian	1256	39	Did not advance
40	Nobutada Hiromatsu (JPN)	Win-Sol	1246	40	Did not advance
41	Brigitte Morillo (ECU)	Ballotage	1232	41	Did not advance
42	Margaret McIver (AUS)	C.K.	1202	42	Did not advance
DNF	Michel Bertraneu (FRA)	Gaillard	Eliminated		Did not advance
