= Equestrian at the 1984 Summer Olympics – Team dressage =

Team dressage at the Games of the XXIII Olympiad
- Venue: Santa Anita Racetrack
- Date: August 8–9, 1984
- Competitors: 36 from 12 nations
- Teams: 13

Medalists
1st place, gold medalist(s)		Reiner Klimke, Uwe Sauer, Herbert Krug	West Germany
2nd place, silver medalist(s)		Otto Hofer, Christine Stückelberger, Amy-Cathérine de Bary	Switzerland
3rd place, bronze medalist(s)		Ulla Håkansson, Ingamay Bylund, Louise Nathhorst	Sweden

The team dressage in equestrian at the 1984 Olympic Games in Los Angeles was held at Santa Anita Racetrack.

== Competition format ==
The team medals were awarded after the Grand-Prix portion of the individual competition. After the Grand-Prix portion of the individual event the three rides of each team were added up and the highest score was the winner, all three scores counted towards the final. Both the team and the individual competitions ran concurrently.

== Results ==
Rank	Nation	Individual results			Total
Rank	Nation	Rider	Horse	Score	Total
1st place, gold medalist(s)	West Germany	Reiner Klimke	Ahlerich	1797	4955
1st place, gold medalist(s)	West Germany	Uwe Sauer	Montevideo	1582	4955
1st place, gold medalist(s)	West Germany	Herbert Krug	Muscadeur	1576	4955
2nd place, silver medalist(s)	Switzerland	Otto Hofer	Limandus	1609	4673
2nd place, silver medalist(s)	Switzerland	Christine Stückelberger	Tansanit	1606	4673
2nd place, silver medalist(s)	Switzerland	Amy-Cathérine de Bary	Aintree	1458	4673
3rd place, bronze medalist(s)	Sweden	Ulla Håkansson	Flamingo	1589	4630
3rd place, bronze medalist(s)	Sweden	Ingamay Bylund	Aleks	1582	4630
3rd place, bronze medalist(s)	Sweden	Louise Nathhorst	Inferno	1459	4630
4	Netherlands	Annemarie Sanders-Keyzer	Amon	1591	4586
4	Netherlands	Tineke Bartels	Ducci	1539	4586
4	Netherlands	Jo Rutten	Ampere	1456	4586
5	Denmark	Anne Grethe Jensen	Marzog	1701	4574
5	Denmark	Torben Ulsø Olsen	Patricia	1496	4574
5	Denmark	Marie-Louise Castenskiold	Stradivarius	1377	4574
6	United States	Hilda Gurney	Keen	1530	4559
6	United States	Sandy Pflueger-Clarke	Marco Polo	1516	4559
6	United States	Robert Dover	Romantico	1513	4559
7	Canada	Christilot Boylen	Anklang	1540	4503
7	Canada	Bonny Chesson	Satchmo	1496	4503
7	Canada	Eva Maria Pracht	Little Joe	1467	4503
8	Great Britain	Christopher Bartle	Willy Trout	1547	4463
8	Great Britain	Jane Bartle-Wilson	Pinocchio	1489	4463
8	Great Britain	Jennie Loriston-Clarke	Prince Consort	1427	4463
9	Austria	Elisabeth Max-Theurer	Acapulco	1556	4391
9	Austria	Peter Ebinger	Malachit	1434	4391
9	Austria	Christa Winkel	Richelieu	1401	4391
10	Yugoslavia	Alojz Lah	Maestoso Monteaura	1523	4381
10	Yugoslavia	Dušan Mavec	Favory Mera	1496	4381
10	Yugoslavia	Stojan Moderc	Maestoso Allegra	1362	4381
11	Mexico	Cristobal Egerstrom	Metternich	1361	3927
11	Mexico	Margarita Nava	Pentagon	1316	3927
11	Mexico	Manuel Cid	Civian	1256	3927
–	France	Margit Otto-Crépin	Crapici	1512	DNF
–	France	Dominique d'Esmé	Fresh Wind	1484	DNF
–	France	Michel Bertraneu	Gaillard	Eliminated	DNF
