= Boxing at the 1984 Summer Olympics – Flyweight =

Olympic boxing tournament

Flyweight boxing at the Games of the XXIII Olympiad
- Venue: Los Angeles Memorial Sports Arena
- Dates: 31 July – 11 August 1984
- Competitors: 31 from 31 nations

Medalists
1st place, gold medalist(s)		Steve McCrory	United States
2nd place, silver medalist(s)		Redzep Redzepovski	Yugoslavia
3rd place, bronze medalist(s)		Eyüp Can	Turkey
3rd place, bronze medalist(s)		Ibrahim Bilali	Kenya

The men's flyweight event was part of the boxing programme at the 1984 Summer Olympics. The weight class allowed boxers of up to 51 kilograms to compete. The competition was held from 31 July to 11 August 1984. 31 boxers from 31 nations competed.

== Medalists ==
Gold	Steve McCrory; United States
Silver	Redzep Redzepovski; Yugoslavia
Bronze	Eyüp Can; Turkey
Bronze	Ibrahim Bilali; Kenya

== Results ==
The following boxers took part in the event:

Rank	Name	Country
1	Steve McCrory	United States
2	Redzep Redzepovski	Yugoslavia
3T	Eyüp Can	Turkey
3T	Ibrahim Bilali	Kenya
5T	Peter Ayesu	Malawi
5T	Heo Yeong-mo	South Korea
5T	Jeff Fenech	Australia
5T	Laureano Ramírez	Dominican Republic
9T	Oppe Pinto	Paraguay
9T	Fausto García	Mexico
9T	Efren Tabanas	Philippines
9T	Seiki Segawa	Japan
9T	David Mwaba	Tanzania
9T	Pat Clinton	Great Britain
9T	Álvaro Mercado	Colombia
9T	José Rodríguez	Puerto Rico
17T	Prabin Tuladhar	Nepal
17T	Andre Seymour	Bahamas
17T	John Kakooza	Uganda
17T	Fayek Gobran	Egypt
17T	Chen King-ming	Chinese Taipei
17T	Junior Ward	Guyana
17T	Bill Dunlop	Canada
17T	Chibou Amna	Niger
17T	René Centellas	Bolivia
17T	Leonard Makhanya	Swaziland
17T	Teraporn Sang-Ano	Thailand
17T	Patrick Mwamba	Zambia
17T	Julio Gómez	Spain
17T	Rubén Carballo	Argentina
17T	Lutuma Diabateza	Zaire

=== First round ===
- Peter Ayesu (MLW) def. Prabin Tuladhar (NEP), 5:0
- Oppe Pinto (PAR) def. Andrew Seymour (BAH), 5:0
- Steve McCrory (USA) def. Tad Joseph (GRN), walk-over
- Fausto Garcia (MEX) def. John Kakooza (UGA), 5:0
- Huh Yong-Mo (KOR) def. Fayek Gobran (EGY), RSC-1
- Efreen Tabanas (PHI) def. Hen Chin Ming (TPE), KO-2
- Seiki Segawa (JPN) def. Junior Ward (GUY), KO-2
- Eyüp Can (TUR) def. Bill Dunlop (CAN), 5:0
- David Mwaba (TNZ) def. Chibou Amna (NIG), 5:0
- Jeff Fenech (AUS) def. René Centellas (BOL), RSC-3
- Pat Clinton (GBR) def. Leonard Makhanya (SWZ), 5:0
- Redzep Redzepovski (YUG) def. Sanguo Teraporn (THA), 3:2
- Ibrahim Bilali (KEN) def. Patrick Mwamba (ZAM), 3:2
- Alvaro Mercado (COL) def. Julio Gómez (ESP), 4:1
- Laureano Ramírez (DOM) def. Oscar Carballo (ARG), RSC-2
- José Rodríguez (PUR) def. Lutuma Diabateza (ZAI), 5:0

=== Second round ===
- Peter Ayesu (MLW) def. Oppe Pinto (PAR), 5:0
- Steve McCrory (USA) def. Fausto Garcia (MEX), RSC-1
- Huh Yong-Mo (KOR) def. Efreen Tabanas (PHI), 4:1
- Eyüp Can (TUR) def. Seiki Segawa (JPN), 4:1
- Jeff Fenech (AUS) def. David Mwaba (TNZ), 5:0
- Redzep Redzepovski (YUG) def. Pat Clinton (GBR), KO-2
- Ibrahim Bilali (KEN) def. Alvaro Mercado (COL), 4:1
- Laureano Ramírez (DOM) def. José Rodríguez (PUR), 5:0

=== Quarterfinals ===
- Steve McCrory (USA) def. Peter Ayesu (MLW), 5:0
- Eyüp Can (TUR) def. Huh Yong-Mo (KOR), 4:1
- Redzep Redzepovski (YUG) def. Jeff Fenech (AUS), 4:1
- Ibrahim Bilali (KEN) def. Laureano Ramírez (DOM), 5:0

=== Semifinals ===
- Steve McCrory (USA) def. Eyüp Can (TUR), 5:0
- Redzep Redzepovski (YUG) def. Ibrahim Bilali (KEN), 5:0

=== Final ===
- Steve McCrory (USA) def. Redzep Redzepovski (YUG), 4:1
