= Yugoslavia at the 1984 Summer Olympics =

- Flag of Yugoslavia
- IOC code: YUG
- NOC: Yugoslav Olympic Committee

in Los Angeles
- Competitors: 139 (105 men, 34 women) in 16 sports
- Flag bearer: Dražen Dalipagić
- Medals Ranked 9th: Gold 7 Silver 4 Bronze 7 Total 18

Summer Olympics appearances (overview)
- 1920; 1924; 1928; 1932; 1936; 1948; 1952; 1956; 1960; 1964; 1968; 1972; 1976; 1980; 1984; 1988; 1992; 1996; 2000

Other related appearances
- Serbia (1912, 2008–pres.); Croatia (1992–pres.); Slovenia (1992–pres.); Bosnia and Herzegovina (1992 S–pres.); Independent Olympic Participants (1992 S); North Macedonia (1996–pres.); Serbia and Montenegro (1996–2006); Montenegro (2008–pres.); Kosovo (2016–pres.)

Yugoslavia competed at the 1984 Summer Olympics in Los Angeles, United States which took place from 29 July to 12 August 1984. Yugoslav athletes had competed in every Summer Olympic Games since their official debut in 1920. The Yugoslav Olympic Committee (JOK) sent a delegation of 139 athletes, 105 men and 34 women, competing in 16 sports, down from 164 competitors in 1980. Due to the Soviet-led boycott, Yugoslavia was one of only three Communist countries to take part at the Games, along with China and Romania.

Yugoslavia left Los Angeles with a total of 18 Olympic medals (7 gold, 4 silver, and 7 bronze), finishing ninth in the overall medal standings, the best total in the history of Yugoslavia's participation in the Olympics. Five of these medals were won in team sports and included gold in both men's and women's handball tournaments, gold in the water polo tournament and bronze medals in men's football and basketball. The most successful sport was wrestling, winning the nation five medals, while the canoeing duo of Matija Ljubek and Mirko Nišović were the only Yugoslav athletes who won more than a single Olympic medal. For the first time in its history, Yugoslavia sent athletes to compete in rhythmic gymnastics, a new event introduced into the Olympic programme, with 14-year-old gymnast Danijela Simić the youngest participant in the entire Yugoslav delegation.

Among the nation's medalists were canoeist Matija Ljubek, who took his third and fourth career Olympic medals, wrestler Shaban Sejdiu, who won his second career Olympic bronze medal, another wrestler Shaban Tërstena became the youngest Olympic Champion ever in Wrestling after winning his gold medal with the age of 19 in the Men's freestyle 52 kg. Rowers Zoran Pančić and Milorad Stanulov who won a bronze medal in double sculls after winning silver in the same event in 1980. Water polo coach Ratko Rudić led the national men's team to triumph in the tournament, a feat he would repeat in 1988.

== Medalists ==
Yugoslavia finished in ninth position in the final medal rankings, with seven gold medals and 18 medals overall. Both totals were Yugoslavia's best ever performance at the Olympic Games.

Medal	Name	Sport	Event	Date
Gold	Vlado Lisjak	Wrestling	Men's Greco-Roman 68 kg	3 August
Gold	Yugoslavia women's national handball team: Svetlana Anastasovska; Alenka Cuderman; Svetlana Dašić; Slavica Dukić; Dragica Đurić; Mirjana Đurica; Emilija Erčić; Ljubinka Janković; Jasna Kolar-Merdan; Ljiljana Mugoša; Svetlana Mugoša; Mirjana Ognjenović; Zorica Pavićević; Jasna Ptujec; Biserka Višnjić	Handball	Women's tournament	9 August
Gold	Matija Ljubek; Mirko Nišović	Canoeing	Men's C-2 500 m	10 August
Gold	Shaban Tërstena	Wrestling	Men's freestyle 52 kg	10 August
Gold	Yugoslavia men's national water polo team: Dragan Andrić; Milivoj Bebić; Perica Bukić; Veselin Đuho; Milorad Krivokapić; Deni Lušić; Igor Milanović; Tomislav Paškvalin; Zoran Petrović; Andrija Popović; Zoran Roje; Goran Sukno; Božo Vuletić	Water polo	Men's tournament	10 August
Gold	Anton Josipović	Boxing	Men's light heavyweight	11 August
Gold	Yugoslavia national handball team: Zlatan Arnautović; Mirko Bašić; Jovica Elezović; Mile Isaković; Pavle Jurina; Milan Kalina; Slobodan Kuzmanovski; Dragan Mladenović; Zdravko Rađenović; Momir Rnić; Branko Štrbac; Veselin Vujović; Veselin Vuković; Zdravko Zovko	Handball	Men's tournament	11 August
Silver	Refik Memišević	Wrestling	Men's Greco-Roman +100 kg	2 August
Silver	Milan Janić	Canoeing	Men's K-1 1000 m	11 August
Silver	Matija Ljubek; Mirko Nišović	Canoeing	Men's C-2 1000 m	11 August
Silver	Redžep Redžepovski	Boxing	Men's flyweight	11 August
Bronze	Jožef Tertei	Wrestling	Men's Greco-Roman 100 kg	3 August
Bronze	Zoran Pančić; Milorad Stanulov	Rowing	Men's double sculls	5 August
Bronze	Mirko Puzović	Boxing	Men's light welterweight	9 August
Bronze	Aziz Salihu	Boxing	Men's super heavyweight	9 August
Bronze	Shaban Sejdiu	Wrestling	Men's freestyle 74 kg	10 August
Bronze	Yugoslavia men's national basketball team: Dražen Dalipagić; Sabit Hadžić; Andro Knego; Emir Mutapčić; Mihovil Nakić; Aleksandar Petrović; Dražen Petrović; Ratko Radovanović; Ivan Sunara; Branko Vukićević; Rajko Žižić; Nebojša Zorkić	Basketball	Men's tournament	10 August
Bronze	Yugoslavia men's national football team: Mirsad Baljić; Mehmed Baždarević; Vlado Čapljić; Borislav Cvetković; Stjepan Deverić; Milko Đurovski; Marko Elsner; Nenad Gračan; Tomislav Ivković; Srečko Katanec; Branko Miljuš; Mitar Mrkela; Jovica Nikolić; Ivan Pudar; Ljubomir Radanović; Admir Smajić; Dragan Stojković	Football	Men's tournament	10 August

Medals by sport
Sport	1st place, gold medalist(s)	2nd place, silver medalist(s)	3rd place, bronze medalist(s)	Total
Wrestling	2	1	2	5
Handball	2	0	0	2
Canoeing	1	2	0	3
Boxing	1	1	2	4
Water polo	1	0	0	1
Basketball	0	0	1	1
Football	0	0	1	1
Rowing	0	0	1	1
Total	7	4	7	18

Medals by date
Day	Date	1st place, gold medalist(s)	2nd place, silver medalist(s)	3rd place, bronze medalist(s)	Total
Day 1	29 July	0	0	0	0
Day 2	30 July	0	0	0	0
Day 3	31 July	0	0	0	0
Day 4	1 August	0	0	0	0
Day 5	2 August	0	1	0	1
Day 6	3 August	1	0	1	2
Day 7	4 August	0	0	0	0
Day 8	5 August	0	0	1	1
Day 9	6 August	0	0	0	0
Day 10	7 August	0	0	0	0
Day 11	8 August	0	0	0	0
Day 12	9 August	1	0	2	3
Day 13	10 August	3	0	3	6
Day 14	11 August	2	3	0	5
Day 15	12 August	0	0	0	0
Total		7	4	7	18

== Competitors ==
The following is the list of number of Yugoslav athletes participating in the Games:

Sport	Men	Women	Total
Athletics	4	2	6
Basketball	12	12	24
Boxing	7	0	7
Canoeing	3	0	3
Cycling	6	0	6
Equestrian	3	0	3
Football	17	0	17
Handball	14	15	29
Gymnastics	0	2	2
Judo	5	0	5
Rowing	5	0	5
Sailing	1	0	1
Shooting	3	3	6
Swimming	3	0	3
Water polo	13	0	13
Wrestling	9	0	9
Total	105	34	139

== Athletics ==
Key

- Note – Ranks given for track events are within the athlete's heat only
- Q = Qualified for the next round
- q = Qualified for the next round as a fastest loser or, in field events, by position without achieving the qualifying target
- NR = National record
- N/A = Round not applicable for the event
- Bye = Athlete not required to compete in round

Men
Field events

Athlete	Event	Qualification		Final	
Athlete	Event	Distance	Position	Distance	Position
Nenad Stekić	Long jump	7.60	14	Did not advance	
Novica Čanović	High jump	2.15	22	Did not advance	
Hrvoje Fižuleto	High jump	2.18	19	Did not advance	
Sejad Krdžalić	Javelin throw	76.52	16	Did not advance	

Women
Field events

Athlete	Event	Qualification		Final	
Athlete	Event	Distance	Position	Distance	Position
Snežana Dančetović	Long jump	6.22	11 Q	5.88	12
Lidija Benedetič-Lapajne	High jump	1.87	16	Did not advance	

== Basketball ==
=== Men's tournament ===
Roster

- Dražen Dalipagić
- Sabit Hadžić
- Andro Knego
- Emir Mutapčić
- Mihovil Nakić
- Aleksandar Petrović
- Dražen Petrović
- Ratko Radovanović
- Ivan Sunara
- Branko Vukićević
- Rajko Žižić
- Nebojša Zorkić

Preliminary round (Group A)

Pos	Team	Pld	W	L	PF	PA	PD	Pts	Qualification
1	Yugoslavia	5	5	0	457	366	+91	10	Quarterfinals
2	Italy	5	4	1	437	363	+74	9	Quarterfinals
3	Australia	5	3	2	383	403	−20	8	Quarterfinals
4	West Germany	5	2	3	384	376	+8	7	Quarterfinals
5	Brazil	5	1	4	401	423	−22	6	9th–12th classification round
6	Egypt	5	0	5	349	480	−131	5	9th–12th classification round

Source: [ FIBA archive]
Rules for classification: 1) points; 2) head-to-head points; 3) head-to-head goal average; 4) head-to-head number of points scored.
- Preliminary round (group A)
  - Defeated West Germany (96–83)
  - Defeated Australia (94–64)
  - Defeated Egypt (100–69)
  - Defeated Brazil (98–85)
  - Defeated Italy (69–65)
- Quarterfinals
  - Defeated Uruguay (110–82)
- Semifinals
  - Lost to Spain (61–74)
- Bronze medal match
  - Defeated Canada (88–82) → Bronze Medal

=== Women's tournament ===
- Preliminary round
  - Lost to United States (55–83)
  - Lost to South Korea (52–55)
  - Lost to PR China (58–79)
  - Defeated Canada (69–68)
  - Lost to Australia (59–62) → Sixth and last place
- Team roster
  - Sanja Ožegović
  - Slavica Šuka
  - Jelica Komnenović
  - Zagorka Počeković
  - Stojna Vangelovska
  - Slavica Pečikoza
  - Slađana Golić
  - Polona Dornik
  - Biljana Majstorović
  - Jasmina Perazić
  - Cvetana Dekleva
  - Marija Uzelac

== Boxing ==
Men's Flyweight (– 51 kg)

- Redžep Redžepovski → Silver Medal
  1. First Round — Defeated Sanguo Teraporn (THA), 3:2
  2. Second Round — Defeated Pat Clinton (GBR), KO-2
  3. Quarterfinals — Defeated Jeff Fenech (AUS), 4:1
  4. Semifinals — Defeated Ibrahim Bilali (KEN), 5:0
  5. Final — Lost to Steve McCrory (USA), 4:1

Men's Bantamweight (– 54 kg)

- Ljubiša Simić
  1. First Round — Lost to Pedro Nolasco (DOM), 1:4

Men's Lightweight (– 60 kg)

- Slobodan Pavlović

Men's Light welterweight (– 63.5 kg)

- Mirko Puzović

Men's Middleweight (– 75 kg)

- Damir Škaro

Men's Light-Heavyweight (– 81 kg)

- Anton Josipović

Men's Super Heavyweight (+ 91 kg)

- Aziz Salihu → Bronze Medal
  1. First Round – Bye
  2. Quarterfinals – Defeated Peter Hussing (FRG), 3:2
  3. Semifinals – Lost to Tyrell Biggs (USA), 0:5

== Canoeing ==
Men's K-1 500 metres

- Milan Janić

Men's K-1 1000 metres

- Milan Janić

Men's C-2 500 metres

- Matija Ljubek, Mirko Nišović

Men's C-2 1000 metres

- Matija Ljubek, Mirko Nišović

== Cycling ==
Six cyclists represented Yugoslavia in 1984.

Individual road race

- Bojan Ropret — +1:19 (→ 7th place)
- Primož Čerin — +15:30 (→ 35th place)
- Jure Pavlič — +18:04 (→ 42nd place)
- Marko Cuderman — +22:20 (→ 46th place)

Team time trial

- Bruno Bulić
- Primož Čerin
- Janez Lampič
- Bojan Ropret

== Equestrianism ==
Individual dressage

- Alojz Lah
- Dušan Mavec
- Stojan Moderc

Team dressage

- Alojz Lah
- Dušan Mavec
- Stojan Moderc

== Football ==
=== Men's tournament ===
Roster

The following is the Yugoslavia squad in the men's football tournament of the 1984 Summer Olympics.

Coach: Ivan Toplak

No.	Pos.	Player	Date of birth (age)	Caps	Goals	1984 club
1	GK	Ivan Pudar	16 August 1961 (aged 22)	2	0	(Football Association of Yugoslavia) Hajduk Split
2	DF	Vlado Čapljić	22 March 1962 (aged 22)	3	0	(Football Association of Yugoslavia) Željezničar
3	DF	Mirsad Baljić	4 March 1962 (aged 22)	6	1	(Football Association of Yugoslavia) Željezničar
4	MF	Srečko Katanec	16 July 1963 (aged 21)	5	0	(Football Association of Yugoslavia) Olimpija
5	DF	Marko Elsner	11 April 1960 (aged 24)	5	0	(Football Association of Yugoslavia) Red Star
6	DF	Ljubomir Radanović	21 July 1960 (aged 24)	6	1	(Football Association of Yugoslavia) Partizan
7	MF	Admir Smajić	7 September 1963 (aged 20)	3	0	(Football Association of Yugoslavia) Partizan
8	MF	Nenad Gračan	23 January 1962 (aged 22)	6	1	(Football Association of Yugoslavia) Rijeka
9	FW	Milko Đurovski	26 February 1963 (aged 21)	2	0	(Football Association of Yugoslavia) Red Star
10	MF	Mehmed Baždarević	28 September 1960 (aged 23)	6	0	(Football Association of Yugoslavia) Željezničar
11	FW	Borislav Cvetković	30 September 1962 (aged 21)	3	5	(Football Association of Yugoslavia) Dinamo Zagreb
12	GK	Tomislav Ivković	11 August 1960 (aged 23)	4	0	(Football Association of Yugoslavia) Red Star
13	MF	Jovica Nikolić	11 February 1959 (aged 25)	5	3	(Football Association of Yugoslavia) Red Star
14	FW	Stjepan Deverić	20 August 1961 (aged 22)	5	5	(Football Association of Yugoslavia) Dinamo Zagreb
15	DF	Branko Miljuš	17 August 1960 (aged 23)	5	0	(Football Association of Yugoslavia) Hajduk Split
16	MF	Dragan Stojković	3 March 1965 (aged 19)	5	0	(Football Association of Yugoslavia) Radnički Niš
17	MF	Mitar Mrkela	10 July 1965 (aged 19)	4	0	(Football Association of Yugoslavia) Red Star

Group play

Pos	Team	Pld	W	D	L	GF	GA	GD	Pts	Qualification
1	Yugoslavia	3	3	0	0	7	3	+4	6	Qualified for quarter-finals
2	Canada	3	1	1	1	4	3	+1	3	Qualified for quarter-finals
3	Cameroon	3	1	0	2	3	5	−2	2	
4	Iraq	3	0	1	2	3	6	−3	1	

Source: FIFA
- Preliminary round (group B)
  - Defeated Cameroon (2–1)
  - Defeated Canada (1–0)
  - Defeated Iraq (4–2)
- Quarterfinals
  - Defeated West Germany (5–2)
- Semifinals
  - Lost to France (2–4, after extra time)
- Bronze medal match
  - Defeated Italy (2–1) → Bronze Medal
- Team roster

== Gymnastics ==
Individual all-around

- Milena Reljin
- Danijela Simić

== Handball ==
=== Men's tournament ===
- Team roster
  - Zlatan Arnautović
  - Mirko Bašić
  - Jovica Elezović
  - Mile Isaković
  - Pavle Jurina
  - Milan Kalina
  - Slobodan Kuzmanovski
  - Dragan Mladenović
  - Zdravko Rađenović
  - Momir Rnić
  - Branko Štrbac
  - Veselin Vujović
  - Veselin Vuković
  - Zdravko Zovko
- Head coach: Branislav Pokrajac

=== Women's tournament ===
- Preliminary Round Robin
  - Yugoslavia – Federal Republic of Germany 20:19 (11:12)
  - Yugoslavia – Austria 30:15 (15:8)
  - Yugoslavia – United States 33:20 (14:10)
  - Yugoslavia – South Korea 29:23 (15:14)
  - Yugoslavia – China 31:25 (15:15) → Gold Medal
- Team roster
  - Jasna Ptujec
  - Mirjana Ognjenović
  - Zorica Pavićević
  - Ljubinka Janković
  - Svetlana Anastasovska
  - Svetlana Dašić
  - Emilija Erčić
  - Alenka Cuderman
  - Svetlana Mugoša
  - Mirjana Đurica
  - Biserka Višnjić
  - Slavica Đukić
  - Jasna Kolar-Merdan
  - Ljiljana Mugoša
  - Dragica Đurić
- Head coach: Josip Samaržija

== Judo ==
Men's Half-Lightweight

- Franc Očko

Men's Lightweight

- Vojo Vujević

Men's Half-Middleweight

- Filip Leščak

Men's Middleweight

- Stanko Lopatić

Men's Heavyweight

- Radomir Kovačević

== Rowing ==
Men

Athlete	Event	Heats		Repechage		Final	
Athlete	Event	Time	Rank	Time	Rank	Time	Rank
Zoran Pančić; Milorad Stanulov	Double sculls	6:49.98	5 R	6:39.70	2 Q	6:39.59	3rd place, bronze medalist(s)
Zlatko Celent; Mirko Ivančić; Dario Vidošević	Coxed pair	7:27.28	4 R	7:28.68	3 FB	7:25.60	7

== Sailing ==
Men

Athlete	Event	Race							Net points	Final rank
Athlete	Event	1	2	3	4	5	6	7	Net points	Final rank
Dušan Puh	Windglider	15	17	13	7	14	16	~~19~~	118.0	15

== Shooting ==
Men's 10m Air Rifle

- Rajmond Debevec
- Šaćir Džeko

Men's 50m 3 Positions

- Goran Maksimović
- Rajmond Debevec

Men's 50m Rifle Prone

- Goran Maksimović

Women's 10m Air Rifle

- Valentina Atanaskovski
- Mirjana Jovović

Women's 50m 3 Positions

- Biserka Vrbek
- Mirjana Jovović

== Swimming ==
Men's 200 m Freestyle

- Borut Petrič
  - Heat — 1:52.74 (→ did not advance, 19th place)
- Darjan Petrič
  - Heat — 1:55.68 (→ did not advance, 30th place)

Men's 400 m Freestyle

- Darjan Petrič
  - Heat — 3:54.39
  - Final — 3:54.88 (→ 6th place)
- Borut Petrič
  - Heat — 3:56.07
  - B-Final — scratched (→ 18th place)

Men's 1500 m Freestyle

- Borut Petrič
  - Heat — 15:36.44 (→ did not advance, 15th place)
- Darjan Petrič
  - Heat — 15:39.79 (→ did not advance, 16th place)

Men's 100 m Butterfly

- Hrvoje Barić
  - Heat — 56.70 (→ did not advance, 29th place)

== Water polo ==
=== Men's tournament ===
- Team roster
  - Milorad Krivokapić
  - Deni Lušić
  - Zoran Petrović
  - Božo Vuletić
  - Veselin Đuho
  - Zoran Roje
  - Milivoj Bebić
  - Perica Bukić
  - Goran Sukno
  - Tomislav Paškvalin
  - Igor Milanović
  - Dragan Andrić
  - Andrija Popović

== Wrestling ==
Greco-Roman

Men's Lightweight

- Vlado Lisjak

Men's Welterweight

- Karlo Kasap

Men's Middleweight

- Momir Petković

Men's Light-Heavyweight

- Karolj Kopas

Men's Heavyweight

- Jožef Tertei

Men's Super-Heavyweight

- Refik Memišević

Freestyle

Men's Flyweight

- Šaban Trstena

Men's Bantamweight

- Zoran Šorov

Men's Welterweight

- Šaban Sejdi
