= Boxing at the 1982 Asian Games – Men's 48 kg =

Boxing competitions

Men's 48 kg at the 1982 Asian Games
- Venue: Pragati Maidan
- Date: 26 November – 3 December 1982
- Competitors: 10 from 10 nations

Medalists
| gold medal | Heo Yong-mo | South Korea |
| silver medal | Efren Tabanas | Philippines |
| bronze medal | Seiki Segawa | Japan |
| bronze medal | Ali Bux | Pakistan |

The men's light flyweight (48 kilograms) event at the 1982 Asian Games took place from 26 November to 3 December 1982 at Pragati Maidan, New Delhi, India.

A boxer may win by knockout or by points with 5 judges scoring each round. The boxer with the higher score from a majority of the judges is the winner.

== Schedule ==
All times are Indian Standard Time (UTC+05:30)

| Date | Time | Event |
|---|---|---|
| Friday, 26 November 1982 | 15:00 | 1st round |
| Sunday, 28 November 1982 | 15:00 | Quarterfinals |
| Tuesday, 30 November 1982 | 15:00 | Semifinals |
| Friday, 3 December 1982 | 15:00 | Final |

== Results ==
Legend

- RSC — Won by referee stop contest

1st round
Yong Hwan-ko (PRK) | RSC
Nipoj Chalermmoo (THA)
Efren Tabanas (PHI) | 5
Donjagatm Nettikumara (SRI) | 0

Quarterfinals
Herry Maitimu (INA) | 1
Seiki Segawa (JPN) | 4
Birender Singh Thapa (IND) | 1
Heo Yong-mo (KOR) | 4
Ali Bux (PAK) | 5
Kazi Shahadat Hossain (BAN) | 0
Yong Hwan-ko (PRK) | 2
Efren Tabanas (PHI) | 3

Semifinals
Seiki Segawa (JPN) | 0
Heo Yong-mo (KOR) | 5
Ali Bux (PAK)
Efren Tabanas (PHI) | RSC

Final
Heo Yong-mo (KOR) | 3
Efren Tabanas (PHI) | 2
