= Steve McCrory =

American boxer (1964–2000)

Personal information
- Born: April 13, 1964 Detroit, Michigan
- Died: August 1, 2000 (aged 36)
Medal record
Men's Boxing
Representing the United States
Olympic Games
Gold medal – first place	1984 Los Angeles	Flyweight
Pan American Games
Bronze medal – third place	1983 Caracas	Flyweight

Steve McCrory (April 13, 1964 – August 1, 2000) was an American boxer, who won the Flyweight Gold medal at the 1984 Summer Olympics. A year earlier he won a bronze medal at the 1983 Pan American Games, as well as the world title at the World Championship Challenge.

== Early life and education ==
The younger brother of former WBC Welterweight champion Milton McCrory, Steve McCrory trained at Kronk Gym in Detroit alongside other world champions including Thomas Hearns and Hilmer Kenty.

He graduated from Pershing High School in Detroit in 1982.

== Amateur career ==
McCrory was the U.S. Amateur flyweight champion in 1982 and 1983. He won a world title at the World Championship Challenge after defeating Yuri Alexandrov of the USSR in 1983, but lost the title to Pedro Reyes of Cuba the following year.

McCrory went on to win a gold medal in flyweight boxing at the 1984 Olympics in Los Angeles.

=== Olympic Results ===
- Defeated Tad Joseph (Grenada) walkover
- Defeated Fausto Garcia (Mexico) RSC 1, in ony 1 minute and 46 seconds
- Defeated Peter Ayesu (Malawi) 5-0
- Defeated Eyup Can (Turkey) 5-0
- Defeated Redzep Redzepovski (Yugoslavia) 4-1

== Professional career ==
Nicknamed Bluesman, McCrory began his professional career in 1984 and challenged IBF Bantamweight Title holder Jeff Fenech in 1986. Fenech dominated and won via 14th-round TKO. This was to be McCrory's last shot at a major title, and he later moved up to Super Featherweight and was beaten by Jesse James Leija.

== Death ==
McCrory died on August 1, 2000, after a prolonged illness.
