= Prabin =

Prabin is a masculine given name. Notable people with the name include:

- Prabin Kumar Chaudhuri (1918–1975), Indian politician
- Prabin Hazarika (fl. 1996–2011), Indian politician
- Prabin Luha (born 1995), Indian cricketer
- Prabin Chandra Sarma (fl. 1996–1998), Indian politician
- Prabin Tuladhar (fl. 1984), Nepalese boxer
