= Centellas =

Centellas is a surname. Notable people with the surname include:

- Carlos de Borja y Centellas, Spanish cardinal
- René Centellas (born 1960), Bolivian boxer
- Ricardo Centellas (1962–2026), Bolivian Roman Catholic prelate
