= Prabin Tuladhar =

Nepalese boxer

Personal information
- Nationality: Nepalese

Sport
- Sport: Boxing

Prabin Tuladhar is a Nepalese boxer. He competed in the men's flyweight event at the 1984 Summer Olympics. At the 1984 Summer Olympics, he lost to Peter Ayesu of Malawi.
