= José Rodríguez (boxer) =

Puerto Rican boxer

Personal information
- Nickname: Pancho
- Nationality: Puerto Rican
- Born: 18 July 1967 (age 58) Humacao, Puerto Rico
- Height: 167 cm (5 ft 6 in)

Sport
- Sport: Boxing
Medal record
Men's amateur boxing
Representing Puerto Rico
World Cup
Silver medal – second place	1985 Seoul	Bantamweight

José Rodríguez (born 18 July 1967) is a Puerto Rican boxer. He competed in the men's flyweight event at the 1984 Summer Olympics.
