= Andre Seymour =

Bahamian boxer (born 1967)

Personal information
- Nationality: Bahamian
- Born: 22 August 1967 (age 57)

Sport
- Sport: Boxing

Andre Seymour (born 22 August 1967) is a Bahamian boxer. He competed at the 1984 Summer Olympics and the 1988 Summer Olympics. At the 1984 Summer Olympics, he lost to Oppe Pinto of Paraguay.
