= Ibrahim Bilali =

Kenya boxer (born 1965)

Olympic medal record

Men's Boxing
| Bronze medal – third place | 1984 Los Angeles | Flyweight |

Ibrahim Bilali (born July 21, 1965) is a retired flyweight boxer from Kenya, who won a bronze medal in the flyweight division (– 51 kg) at the 1984 Summer Olympics in Los Angeles, California. In the semifinals he was defeated by Redzep Redzepovski of Yugoslavia, the eventual silver medalist.

== 1984 Olympic results ==
Below are the results of Ibrahim Bilali, a Kenyan flyweight boxer who competed at the 1984 Los Angeles Olympics:

- Round of 32: Defeated Patrick Mwamba (Zambia) by decision, 3-2
- Round of 16: Defeated Alvaro Mercado (Colombia) by decision, 4-1
- Quarterfinal: Defeated Laureano Ramirez Padilla (Dominican Republic) by decision, 5-0
- Semifinal: Lost to Redzep Redzepovski (Yugoslavia) by decision, 0-5 (was awarded bronze medal)
