= Nobutada Hiromatsu =

Japanese equestrian

Personal information
- Nationality: Japanese
- Born: 8 July 1942 (age 82)

Sport
- Sport: Equestrian

Nobutada Hiromatsu (born 8 July 1942) is a Japanese equestrian. He competed in the individual dressage event at the 1984 Summer Olympics.
