= Rubén Carballo =

Argentine boxer

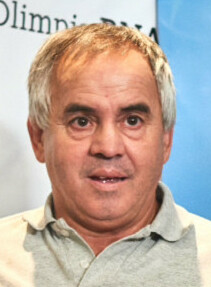

Personal information
- Born: 25 December 1962 Buenos Aires, Argentina
- Died: 14 October 2024 (aged 61)

Sport
- Sport: Boxing

Rubén Carballo (25 December 1962 – 14 October 2024) was an Argentine boxer. He competed in the men's flyweight event at the 1984 Summer Olympics.
