= Isidro Pérez =

Mexican boxer

Personal information
- Nickname: Sid
- Born: May 24, 1964 Puerto Marqués, Mexico
- Died: January 9, 2013 (aged 48) Mexico City, Mexico
- Weight: Light flyweight; Flyweight

Boxing career
- Stance: Orthodox

Boxing record
- Total fights: 69
- Wins: 57
- Win by KO: 41
- Losses: 9
- Draws: 3

Isidro Pérez (May 24, 1964 – January 9, 2013) was a Mexican professional boxer. Pérez is a former WBO Flyweight Champion.

== Professional career ==
In May 1986, Isidro won the Mexican National Light Flyweight Championship by beating veteran Jorge Cano.

=== WBC Light Flyweight Championship ===
In his first World Championship attempt he lost a very disputed twelve-round decision to Jung-Koo Chang in Chungmu Gymnasium, Daejeon, South Korea.

=== WBO Flyweight Championship ===
On August 18, 1990 Pérez won the WBO Flyweight Championship by upsetting Puerto Rico's Angel Rosario with a twelfth round T.K.O. in Ponce, Puerto Rico.

== Professional boxing record ==
| 69 fights | 57 wins | 9 losses |
|---|---|---|
| By knockout | 41 | 3 |
| By decision | 16 | 6 |
| Draws | 3 | |

| No. | Result | Record | Opponent | Type | Round, time | Date | Location | Notes |
|---|---|---|---|---|---|---|---|---|
| 69 | Loss | 57–9–3 | Antonio Oscar Salas | TKO | 2 (10) | 1997-08-15 | Acapulco, Mexico | |
| 68 | Win | 57–8–3 | Efren Torres | TKO | 6 (10) | 1997-04-18 | Acapulco, Mexico | |
| 67 | Loss | 56–8–3 | Pat Clinton | SD | 12 (12) | 1992-03-18 | Kelvin Hall, Glasgow, Scotland | Lost WBO flyweight title |
| 66 | Win | 56–7–3 | Alli Galvez | SD | 12 (12) | 1991-08-10 | Arena Nacional, Santiago, Chile | Retained WBO flyweight title |
| 65 | Loss | 55–7–3 | Ismael Rodriguez | TKO | 8 (?) | 1991-04-10 | Mexico | |
| 64 | Win | 55–6–3 | Alli Galvez | UD | 12 (12) | 1990-11-03 | Centro Internacional Acapulco, Acapulco, Mexico | Retained WBO flyweight title |
| 63 | Win | 54–6–3 | Angel Rosario | TKO | 12 (12) | 1990-08-18 | Auditorio Juan Pachín Vicéns, Ponce, Puerto Rico | Won vacant WBO flyweight title |
| 62 | Win | 53–6–3 | Antonio Herrera | KO | 1 (?) | 1990-07-28 | Puebla, Mexico | |
| 61 | Win | 52–6–3 | Carlos Salinas | TKO | 5 (?) | 1990-05-19 | Mexico City, Mexico | |
| 60 | Loss | 51–6–3 | José de Jesús | UD | 12 (12) | 1989-10-21 | San Juan, Puerto Rico | For WBO light-flyweight title |
| 59 | Loss | 51–5–3 | Je Suk Park | TD | 8 (10) | 1989-03-25 | Daegu Gymnasium, Daegu, South Korea | |
| 58 | Win | 51–4–3 | Ramon Alicea | PTS | 10 (10) | 1989-03-18 | Arena Coliseo, Mexico City, Mexico | |
| 57 | Win | 50–4–3 | Joaquin Feliciano | PTS | 10 (10) | 1988-11-26 | Mexico City, Mexico | |
| 56 | Win | 49–4–3 | Edgar Romero | TKO | 4 (?) | 1988-04-16 | Mexico City, Mexico | |
| 55 | Win | 48–4–3 | Leonardo Lorenzo | PTS | 10 (10) | 1988-02-05 | Mexico City, Mexico | |
| 54 | Loss | 47–4–3 | Chang Jung-koo | UD | 12 (12) | 1987-12-13 | Chungmu Gymnasium, Daejeon, South Korea | For WBC light-flyweight title |
| 53 | Win | 47–3–3 | Emilio Ortega | PTS | 8 (8) | 1987-08-21 | Mexico | |
| 52 | Loss | 46–3–3 | Willy Salazar | KO | 5 (?) | 1987-03-14 | Mexico City, Mexico | |
| 51 | Win | 46–2–3 | Efrain Martinez | TKO | 8 (?) | 1987-03-08 | Mexico City, Mexico | |
| 50 | Win | 45–2–3 | Tomas Maldonado | PTS | 10 (10) | 1986-08-21 | Mexico City, Mexico | |
| 49 | Win | 44–2–3 | Jorge Cano | PTS | 12 (12) | 1986-05-24 | Mexico City, Mexico | Won Mexican light-flyweight title |
| 48 | Win | 43–2–3 | Luis Enrique Keb Baas | TKO | 5 (?) | 1985-11-30 | Mérida, Mexico | |
| 47 | Win | 42–2–3 | Hilario Duran | TKO | 7 (?) | 1985-07-27 | Mexico City, Mexico | |
| 46 | Win | 41–2–3 | Mercedes Valenzuela | TKO | 9 (?) | 1985-06-14 | La Paz, Mexico | |
| 45 | Draw | 40–2–3 | Ruben Padilla | PTS | 10 (10) | 1985-05-31 | Salina Cruz, Mexico | |
| 44 | Win | 40–2–2 | Rafael Guerra | KO | 2 (?) | 1985-02-23 | Mexico City, Mexico | |
| 43 | Loss | 39–2–2 | Francisco Montiel | PTS | 10 (10) | 1984-12-14 | La Paz, Mexico | |
| 42 | Win | 39–1–2 | Amado Ursua | TKO | 7 (?) | 1984-07-27 | Mexicali, Mexico | |
| 41 | Win | 38–1–2 | Rene Medina | TKO | 7 (?) | 1984-03-16 | Acapulco, Mexico | |
| 40 | Win | 37–1–2 | Alan De Leon | TKO | 9 (10) | 1983-11-26 | Gimnasio Nuevo Panama, Panama City, Panama | |
| 39 | Win | 36–1–2 | Emilio Santos | TKO | 7 (?) | 1983-09-02 | Acapulco, Mexico | |
| 38 | Win | 35–1–2 | Aaron Garcia | TKO | 3 (?) | 1983-06-04 | Mexico City, Mexico | |
| 37 | Win | 34–1–2 | Camilo Gentil Ortiz | KO | 3 (?) | 1983-03-27 | Acapulco, Mexico | |
| 36 | Draw | 33–1–2 | Eduardo Acosta | PTS | 10 (10) | 1983-02-05 | Mérida, Mexico | |
| 35 | Win | 33–1–1 | Alejandro Flores | TKO | 7 (?) | 1982-11-09 | Acapulco, Mexico | |
| 34 | Win | 32–1–1 | Juan Manuel Rios | KO | 10 (12) | 1982-10-01 | Acapulco, Mexico | |
| 33 | Win | 31–1–1 | Julio Cesar Cardona | KO | 8 (?) | 1982-09-03 | Acapulco, Mexico | |
| 32 | Win | 30–1–1 | Pedro Moreno | TKO | 3 (?) | 1982-07-23 | Acapulco, Mexico | |
| 31 | Win | 29–1–1 | Carlos Garcia | TKO | 8 (?) | 1982-05-14 | Acapulco, Mexico | |
| 30 | Win | 28–1–1 | Venancio Rosas | TKO | 8 (12) | 1982-03-05 | Acapulco, Mexico | |
| 29 | Win | 27–1–1 | Juan Manuel Rios | PTS | 12 (12) | 1981-12-18 | Arena Coliseo, Acapulco, Mexico | |
| 28 | Draw | 26–1–1 | Aaron Garcia | PTS | 10 (10) | 1981-08-14 | Acapulco, Mexico | |
| 27 | Win | 26–1 | Jose Vasquez | TKO | 10 (?) | 1981-07-10 | Acapulco, Mexico | |
| 26 | Win | 25–1 | Rey Hernandez | KO | 2 (?) | 1981-06-19 | Acapulco, Mexico | |
| 25 | Win | 24–1 | Abel Vargas | PTS | 10 (10) | 1981-05-15 | Zihuatanejo, Mexico | |
| 24 | Win | 23–1 | Grillito Carranza | TKO | 10 (?) | 1981-04-10 | Cárdenas, Mexico | |
| 23 | Win | 22–1 | Gallito Perez | KO | 3 (?) | 1981-03-06 | Acapulco, Mexico | |
| 22 | Win | 21–1 | Alacran Aguilar | KO | 4 (?) | 1981-01-23 | Acapulco, Mexico | |
| 21 | Win | 20–1 | Anastacio Noyola | KO | 2 (?) | 1980-10-31 | Acapulco, Mexico | |
| 20 | Loss | 19–1 | Pedro Flores | PTS | 8 (8) | 1980-09-26 | Acapulco, Mexico | |
| 19 | Win | 19–0 | Jose Luis Arceta | PTS | 8 (8) | 1980-08-15 | Acapulco, Mexico | |
| 18 | Win | 18–0 | Gilberto De Jesus | KO | 1 (?) | 1980-07-11 | Acapulco, Mexico | |
| 17 | Win | 17–0 | Ismael Benitez | KO | 8 (?) | 1980-05-23 | Acapulco, Mexico | |
| 16 | Win | 16–0 | Margarito Chavez | PTS | 8 (8) | 1980-04-11 | Mexico | |
| 15 | Win | 15–0 | Antelmo Cuevas | KO | 8 (?) | 1980-03-21 | Acapulco, Mexico | |
| 14 | Win | 14–0 | Raul Reyes | TKO | 8 (?) | 1980-02-29 | Acapulco, Mexico | |
| 13 | Win | 13–0 | Juan Herrera | KO | 8 (10) | 1979-12-28 | Mexico | |
| 12 | Win | 12–0 | Julian Gomez | KO | 8 (?) | 1979-11-26 | Mexico | |
| 11 | Win | 11–0 | Rodrigo Limon | KO | 6 (?) | 1979-11-01 | Petatlán, Mexico | |
| 10 | Win | 10–0 | Gallito Perez | PTS | 4 (4) | 1979-10-25 | Acapulco, Mexico | |
| 9 | Win | 9–0 | Martin Garcia | PTS | 4 (4) | 1979-10-04 | Acapulco, Mexico | |
| 8 | Win | 8–0 | Isidro Valle | KO | 6 (?) | 1979-09-16 | Mexico | |
| 7 | Win | 7–0 | Miguel Guzman | PTS | 6 (6) | 1979-08-12 | Acapulco, Mexico | |
| 6 | Win | 6–0 | Gallito Perez | PTS | 6 (6) | 1979-07-17 | Acapulco, Mexico | |
| 5 | Win | 5–0 | Juan Alvarado | TKO | 6 (?) | 1979-06-15 | Petatlán, Mexico | |
| 4 | Win | 4–0 | Andres Garcia | TKO | 4 (?) | 1979-05-18 | Acapulco, Mexico | |
| 3 | Win | 3–0 | Tomas Hernandez | KO | 4 (?) | 1979-04-27 | Acapulco, Mexico | |
| 2 | Win | 2–0 | Ruben Solis | KO | 4 (?) | 1979-03-23 | Petatlán, Mexico | |
| 1 | Win | 1–0 | Raul Arroyo | KO | 4 (?) | 1979-02-15 | Petatlán, Mexico | |

== Death ==
Isidro Pérez was reported to have died in Mexico in January 2013, he was reported missing earlier. Perez's friends and family have not heard from him in months previous to reporting him missing and he has not cashed a pension check since September 2012. Date of death was not reported.

== See also ==
- List of male boxers
- List of Mexican boxing world champions
- List of world flyweight boxing champions

Sporting positions
Regional boxing titles
| Preceded by Jorge Cano | Mexican light-flyweight champion May 24, 1986 – 1986; Vacated | Vacant Title next held by Jorge Cano |
World boxing titles
| Vacant Title last held by Elvis Álvarez | WBO flyweight champion August 18, 1990 – March 18, 1992 | Succeeded by Pat Clinton |
