= Libby Hernández =

Puerto Rican equestrian

Personal information
- Nationality: Puerto Rican
- Born: 22 September 1947 (age 77)

Sport
- Sport: Equestrian

Libby Hernández (born 22 September 1947) is a Puerto Rican equestrian. She competed in the individual dressage event at the 1984 Summer Olympics.
