= Julio Gómez (boxer) =

Spanish boxer (born 1959)

Julio Ramón Gómez Pando (born December 29, 1959, in Santander, Cantabria) is a retired boxer from Spain. He represented his native country at the 1984 Summer Olympics in Los Angeles. There, he was stopped in the first round of the flyweight division (– 51 kg) by Colombia's Álvaro Mercado.
