= Brigitte Morillo =

Ecuadorian equestrian

Personal information
- Nationality: Ecuadorian
- Born: 28 June 1960 (age 64)

Sport
- Sport: Equestrian

Brigitte Morillo (born 28 June 1960) is an Ecuadorian equestrian. She competed in the individual dressage event at the 1984 Summer Olympics.
