= Anne Grethe Jensen =

Danish equestrian (born 1951)

Personal information
- Born: November 7, 1951 (age 73); Vejlø, Denmark
Medal record
Equestrian
Representing Denmark
Olympic Games
Silver medal – second place	1984 Los Angeles	Individual dressage
World Championships
Gold medal – first place	1986 Cedar Valley	Individual dressage
Bronze medal – third place	1982 Lausanne	Team dressage
European Championships
Gold medal – first place	1983 Aachen	Individual dressage
Silver medal – second place	1983 Aachen	Team dressage
Silver medal – second place	1985 Copenhagen	Team dressage
Bronze medal – third place	1985 Copenhagen	Individual dressage
World Cup
Gold medal – first place	1986 Den Bosch	Individual dressage
Silver medal – second place	1987 Essen	Individual dressage

Anne Grethe Jensen (born November 7, 1951 in Vejlø, Denmark) is a Danish equestrian. She won a silver medal in individual dressage at the 1984 Summer Olympics in Los Angeles on the horse Marzog. She is also a one-time World Champion and one-time European Champion in individual dressage. Reiner Klimke took the gold medals at that occasion. Two years after she won the World Championship. Reiner Klimke did however not compete at that event.

At the 1988 Olympics she was the flagbearer for the Danish delegation.
