= Marian Cunningham =

Peruvian equestrian

Personal information
- Nationality: Peruvian, American
- Born: 23 November 1951 (age 73); Lima, Peru

Sport
- Sport: Equestrian

Marian Cunningham (born 23 November 1951) is a Peruvian equestrian. She competed in the individual dressage event at the 1984 Summer Olympics. She also competed at the 1983 Pan American Games in Venezuela.

Cunningham is active as international judge on 4* level and has judged many Concours de Dressage International (CDIs) and several major championships in dressage around the world.
