= Efren Tabanas =

Filipino boxer (born 1962)

Personal information
- Nationality: Filipino
- Born: December 31, 1962 (age 63) Philippines
- Height: 5 ft 3 in (160 cm)
- Weight: 112 lb (51 kg)

Sport
- Sport: Boxing
- Weight class: Flyweight

Efren Tabanas (born December 31, 1962) is a Filipino amateur boxer. He competed in the men's flyweight event at the 1984 Summer Olympics. At the 1984 Summer Olympics, Tabanas defeated Chen King-ming of Taiwan before losing to Heo Yong-mo of South Korea. Tabanas also worked with the Cebu City Sports Commission where he helped train the local youth in boxing.
