= Margaret McIver =

Australian equestrian (1933–2020)

Personal information
- Born: Margaret Elizabeth Young; 7 August 1933 Gordon, Victoria, Australia
- Died: 21 July 2020 (aged 86) Ballarat, Victoria, Australia

Sport
- Country: Australia
- Sport: Equestrian
- Event: Dressage

Margaret Elizabeth McIver (7 August 1933 – 21 July 2020) was an Australian equestrian, dressage coach and judge.

Before switching to dressage, McIver competed at the Melbourne Royal and at other Victorian shows in showjumping on Bonanza and also in eventing on Pyewacket.

McIver was the first Australian to represent her country in dressage when she competed at the Los Angeles 1984 Olympics in the individual event. Riding C.K., she finished in 42nd place. Her horse was named after his breeder, Colin Kelly, who in 1949 won the first dressage event held in Victoria.

In May 2007, McIver was awarded an honorary doctorate by the University of Ballarat in recognition of her contribution to dressage in Australia as an Olympic competitor, and dressage coach and judge.

McIver was an honorary life member of Equestrian Australia. In January 2000, she was awarded the Australian Sports Medal as the first Australian to compete at the Olympics in dressage.

She died on 21 July 2020 at the age of 86.
