= Fayek 'Adly 'Azb =

Egyptian boxer (1958–2021)

Personal information
- Full name: Fayek 'Adly 'Azb Gobran
- Nationality: Egyptian
- Born: 26 May 1958; Alexandria, Egypt
- Died: 31 October 2021

Sport
- Sport: Boxing

Fayek 'Adly 'Azb Gobran (26 May 1958 – 31 October 2021) was an Egyptian boxer. He competed in the men's flyweight event at the 1984 Summer Olympics.

He won a gold medal at the 1979 Mediterranean Games, and won silver at the 1983 Mediterranean Games after losing against Brahim Brahimi. In the Olympics, he competed for his home country, but was subsequently defeated by Heo Yong-Mo.
