= Otto Hofer =

Swiss equestrian (born 1944)

Personal information
- Born: 28 June 1944 (age 82)
Medal record
Equestrian
Representing Switzerland
Olympic Games
Silver medal – second place	1984 Los Angeles	Team dressage
Silver medal – second place	1988 Seoul	Team dressage
Bronze medal – third place	1984 Los Angeles	Individual dressage
European Championships
Silver medal – second place	1985 Copenhagen	Individual dressage
Silver medal – second place	1987 Goodwood	Team dressage
Bronze medal – third place	1983 Aachen	Team dressage
Bronze medal – third place	1989 Mondorf	Team dressage

Otto Josef Hofer (born 28 June 1944) is a Swiss equestrian. He won an individual bronze medal at the 1984 Summer Olympics in Los Angeles, and a silver medal with the Swiss team. He won a silver medal with the Swiss team at the 1988 Summer Olympics in Seoul.
