= Eyüp Can =

Turkish boxer (born 1964)

Medal record

Representing Turkey

Men's boxing

Olympic Games
Bronze medal – third place	1984 Los Angeles	Flyweight

World Amateur Championships
Bronze medal – third place	1986 Reno	Flyweight

Eyüp Can (born August 3, 1964, in Pınarbaşı, Cihanbeyli, Konya, Turkey) is a Turkish retired boxer. He won a Flyweight Bronze medal at the 1984 Summer Olympics, losing in the semi-final to eventual gold medalist Steve McCrory. Two years later, he won the bronze medal at the 1986 World Amateur Boxing Championships in Reno, United States.

== Olympic results ==
- Defeated Bill Dunlop (Canada) 5-0
- Defeated Seiki Segawa (Japan) 4-1
- Defeated Huh Yong-Mo (South Korea) 4-1
- Lost to Steve McCrory (United States) 0-5

== Pro career ==
Can began his professional career in 1986 and had limited success, losing his only defining fight, a decision loss to former WBA Light Flyweight title holder Joey Olivo. He retired in 1992 with a record of 15-1-0.
