= Tyrone Downes =

Barbados boxer (born 1957)

Personal information
- Born: 24 February 1957 (age 69) Bridgetown, Barbados
- Weight: feather/super feather/light/light welter/welter/light middleweight

Boxing career

Boxing record
- Total fights: 45
- Wins: 35 (KO 16)
- Losses: 10 (KO 6)
- Draws: 0

Tyrone Downes (born 24 February 1957) born in Bridgetown is a Barbadian-Trinitarian professional feather/super feather/light/light welter/welter/light middleweight boxer of the 1970s, '80s and '90s who won the Barbados featherweight title, Barbados lightweight title, World Boxing Council (WBC) FECARBOX featherweight title, and Commonwealth middleweight title, and was a challenger for the USA New York State welterweight title against Larry Barnes, and World Boxing Council (WBC) featherweight title against Jeff Fenech, his professional fighting weight varied from featherweight to lightweight, although his final 2 bouts at the end of his career were fought at welterweight.

Downes also fought future IBF world Jr. Welterweight champion Vince Phillips as a substitute for a fighter named Fernando Sanchez; he survived several knockdowns before being stopped in round seven of an ESPN televised fight by Phillips.
