= Junior Ward =

Guyanese boxer

Personal information
- Nationality: Guyanese
- Born: 29 June 1956 (age 68)

Sport
- Sport: Boxing

Junior Ward (born 29 June 1956) is a Guyanese boxer. He competed in the men's flyweight event at the 1984 Summer Olympics.
