= Jeff Fenech =

Australian boxer (born 1964)

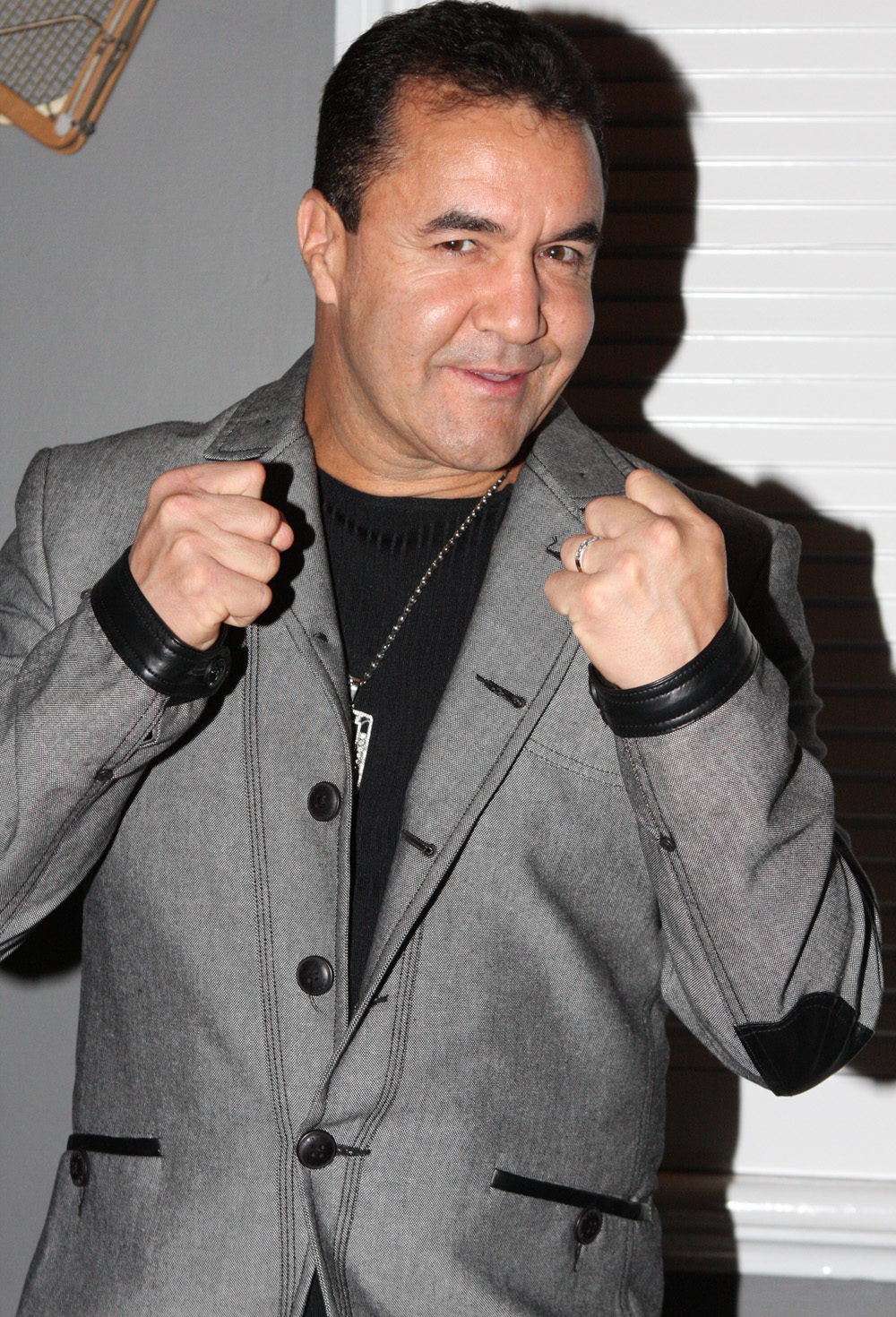

Personal information
- Nicknames: Marrickville Mauler; Brick Top
- Born: Jeff Fenech; 28 May 1964 (age 62) Sydney, New South Wales, Australia
- Height: 5 ft 7 in (170 cm)
- Weight: Super-flyweight; Bantamweight; Super-bantamweight; Featherweight; Super-featherweight; Lightweight

Boxing career
- Reach: 66 1/2 in (169 cm)
- Stance: Orthodox

Boxing record
- Total fights: 33
- Wins: 28
- Win by KO: 21
- Losses: 3
- Draws: 1
Medal record
Men's amateur boxing
Representing Australia
World Cup
Bronze medal – third place	1983 Rome	Flyweight
Commonwealth Championships
Bronze medal – third place	1983 Belfast	Flyweight
Oceanian Championships
Gold medal – first place	1984 Taoyuan	Flyweight

Jeff Fenech (born 28 May 1964) is an Australian former professional boxer who competed between 1984 and 2008. He won world titles in three weight divisions, having held the IBF bantamweight title from 1985 to 1987, the WBC super-bantamweight title from 1987 to 1988, the WBC featherweight title from 1988 to 1990. He retroactively won a fourth weight division title, the WBC super-featherweight title in 1991, after the WBC recounted his first bout against Azumah Nelson which had been a controversial decision draw. Fenech was trained by renowned Sydney-based trainer Johnny Lewis.

Jeff Fenech was inducted into the International Boxing Hall of Fame in 2002 and the Australian National Boxing Hall of Fame Moderns category in 2003, and became the 4th person to be elevated to Legend status in 2013.

== Boxing career ==
Fenech was born in St Peters, Sydney and is of Maltese parentage. After playing junior rugby league and getting into trouble with the police as a child, Fenech was turned onto boxing when he attended the Newtown Police Boys Club in Sydney where he met Johnny Lewis. From there Fenech had a stellar amateur career, which led to him representing his country at the 1984 Summer Olympics in Los Angeles where he was selected as the boxing team captain. At the Olympics, Fenech lost a controversial quarter-final bout to Yugoslavian Redžep Redžepovski. Fenech was initially given the decision, but after intervention by the Olympic Boxing Committee and a total recount, the decision was reversed with Redžepovski being awarded the win. Many of the other boxers and those in the press felt that Fenech had been robbed of a chance to win an Olympic medal and most boxing writers noted how political amateur boxing was, especially at the Olympic Games.

It was that decision that led Fenech to turn professional later in 1984, and in his first professional fight he defeated Bobby Williams by a knockout in round two. Fenech quickly gained a reputation as a fast starter: he won his first eleven bouts by knockout, and held his first fight abroad in only his fourth fight, when he beat Iliesa Manila by a knockout in two rounds in Fiji.

He beat fringe contenders Wayne Mulholland and Rolando Navarro, both by a knockout in the fifth round, to start 1985. After those two wins, he was placed number one among the world's bantamweights by the International Boxing Federation. However, his early wins by KO had some of the press wondering if he could last the full 15 round distance.

=== Bantamweight champion ===
Fenech took only six professional fights to become the number one contender. He became the eighth-fastest boxer to fight for a world title after beginning his career when he challenged Satoshi Shingaki for the IBF Bantamweight title in only his seventh bout, displacing the second Davey Moore, and trailing Shingaki himself, Leon Spinks, Saensak Muangsurin, Pete Rademacher, Joves De La Puz, Joko Arter and Rafael Lovera. Fenech was the third fastest boxer to become a world champion, behind Muangsuring and Spinks, when he knocked out Shingaki in nine rounds in front of a packed house at the Horden Pavilion in Sydney. After two non-title knockout wins, he gave Shingaki a rematch at the State Sports Centre in Sydney and retained the crown with a knockout in three rounds. After one more non-title knockout win, Fenech had to go the distance for the first time, when he faced American Jerome Coffee at the Sydney Entertainment Centre, retaining the title by a 15-round unanimous decision.

In 1986, Fenech had only two bouts, but they were both major fights: He won a 10-round, non-title fight decision over former WBC bantamweight and future super bantamweight world champion Daniel Zaragoza, and he retained his IBF world championship with a TKO in round 14 over American Steve McCrory in a bout dubbed "Olympic Revenge" by Fenech's then promoter Bill Mordy. McCrory, like Fenech, had competed in the flyweight division at the Los Angeles Olympics, winning the Gold Medal by defeating Redžep Redžepovski in the final. After the bout at the Sydney Entertainment Centre, McCrory graciously allowed the Australian to wear his Olympic Gold Medal to show off to the crowd. During the fight with McCrory, Fenech wore green and red trunks, the colours of the South Sydney Rabbitohs rugby league team with their tough forward Mario Fenech (no relation) in his corner. McCrory was trained out of the Kronk Gym in Detroit.

=== Super bantamweight champion ===
1987 was a big year for Fenech. He went up in weight, and in his first fight as a super bantamweight, he defeated Tony Miller by a decision. Then the WBC super bantamweight champion, Samart Payakaroon, travelled to Australia to defend his belt against Fenech. Fenech became a two-weight world champion by knocking Payakaroon out in four rounds. For his next defense, he met future world bantamweight champion Greg Richardson and knocked him out in five. Next it was former WBC bantamweight champion Carlos Zarate's turn to challenge Fenech. Fenech retained his crown by a technical decision win in four rounds at the Perth Entertainment Centre, and then finished his year by knocking out Osmar Avila in one round in a non-title affair.

=== Featherweight champion ===
By 1988, Fenech had grown into a featherweight, and the WBC matched him with Puerto Rico's former world super bantamweight champion Victor Luvi Callejas for their vacant featherweight title, once again, in Sydney. Fenech joined boxing's exclusive group of fighters who have been world champs in three or more divisions, by knocking Callejas out in the 11th round. He retained that title twice before the year was over, knocking out Tyrone Downes and Georgie "Go Go" Navarro, both in the fifth round.

In 1989, he beat Marcos Villasana and former Julio César Chávez challenger Mario Martinez, both by decision.

=== Super featherweight title challenges ===
After that, Fenech took one year off and came back in 1991 as a super featherweight. After beating Johnny Calhoun by a knockout in four, he tried to become a four division world champion when he met Azumah Nelson. The fight was fought on the undercard to the Mike Tyson vs Razor Ruddock rematch at Caesars Palace in Las Vegas. After 12 ferocious rounds the bout was controversially declared a draw with many of the boxing press who were present (as well as Tyson) claiming that Fenech had been robbed of a clear win. Fenech has accused Nelson's promoter Don King of fixing the fight: "Him being Azumah Nelson and being under the Don King banner helped him because I believe the referee (Joe Cortez) didn’t let me do what I wanted to do, breaking up the fight, let Azumah hit me after the bell. People want to say I’m a dirty fighter but I only retaliate when someone does something to me. I’ve got no need to do something dirty at the start because I’m busy trying to cut the ring off and put pressure on. Like I said, although I won the fight, nobody tried to help me like that. The judging, the referring, everything was against me." On Monday 7 November 2022, a review of the fight by WBC Boxing retrospectively declared Fenech the winner, thus giving him a fourth world title.

Fenech returned to Australia and after beating Miguel Francia, Nelson travelled to Melbourne to offer Fenech a second title try. On 1 March 1992, in front of over 30,000 fans at the Princes Park football stadium, Fenech suffered his first loss, when he was knocked out in the eighth round for Nelson to retain the world title. Fenech's TKO loss was recognized as the Ring Magazine Upset of the Year.

After that fight, he fought sporadically. In 1993, he was beaten in seven rounds by knockout by American former IBF featherweight champion Calvin Grove at the Rod Laver Arena in Melbourne, and in 1995, he beat Tialano Tovar, by a knockout in eight in New Jersey.

=== Lightweight title challenge ===
In 1996, in what was thought to have been his last fight (he fought Nelson a third time 12 years later), he lost to IBF lightweight champion Phillip Holiday of South Africa by a knockout in the second round. He retired after the bout.

Fenech retired with a record of 28 wins, 3 losses and 1 draw, with 21 wins by knockout.

== Post-retirement career ==
Fenech was inducted into the Sport Australia Hall of Fame in 1986.

In retirement, Fenech has kept busy, and now he is the owner of a sports clothing brand that carries his name in Australia. In addition, he was inducted in 2002 into the International Boxing Hall of Fame in Canastota, New York. Fenech has become a trainer training fighters such as Danny Green, Nedal Hussein, Hussein Hussein, Sakio Bika, and former IBF flyweight champion Vic Darchinyan.

On 5 January 2004, Fenech was attacked and stabbed by four men in Sydney, receiving facial cuts that required plastic surgery.

In June of the same year, the Fenech family home was attacked by shooters; seven bullets were recovered but no one was injured. Australian police believed the two attacks against Fenech are connected, ranging from a bar fight that Fenech had with a gang-member in 2003. The Australian newspaper quoted someone related to a Lebanese gang stating that "they will get him", but Fenech does not believe that the violent events are related.

In March 2005, Fenech became the trainer for former heavyweight champion Mike Tyson, in an effort to relaunch Tyson's career.

During the year 2020, Fenech trained Mike Tyson once again in preparation for Tyson's exhibition bout against Roy Jones Jr.

Despite repeated denials made in the popular press and on his website, Fenech pleaded guilty to his role in the 2005 theft of 3 gold watches worth a total of $327 from a Gold Coast, Queensland boutique store. There was clear evidence of his involvement from in-store security cameras, revealing that Fenech actively participated in the incident.

=== Boxing comeback against Nelson ===
In March 2008, Fenech – at age 43 – announced a comeback to professional boxing and lost 22 kilos in preparation for the fight. He was to fight Azumah Nelson (who was 49 years old by this time) in what was later built up as the grudge match of the century. The two were to do battle on 24 June 2008 in Melbourne, Australia. A reality series/documentary on Fenech's life aired on Channel 9 and Fox Sports in the weeks leading up to the fight. On 24 June 2008, Fenech won the grudge match against Azumah Nelson by a majority decision, one judge scoring the fight a draw and the last two judges scoring it in favour of Fenech.

In June 2008, Fenech won the Shane Warne 888 Poker World Series of Poker Celebrity Bounty Event at Crown Casino. Fenech now appears at poker events around the world including the Aussie Millions and the World Series of Poker.

== Amateur career ==
- 1983 Oceanic Flyweight champion
- 1983 3rd place at Flyweight in World Championships in Rome, Italy. Results were:
  - Defeated Marcelino Diaz (Colombia) points
  - Lost to Huh Yong-Mo (South Korea) points
- 1983 3rd place as a Flyweight at Commonwealth Titles in Belfast, Northern Ireland.
- 1984 Oceanic Flyweight champion
- 1984 represented Australia as a Flyweight at Olympic Games in Los Angeles. Results were
  - Round of 32: Defeated Rene Centellas (Bolivia) KO 3
  - Round of 16: Defeated David Mwaba (Tanzania) points
  - Quarterfinal: Lost to Redzep Redzepovski (Yugoslavia) points

== Professional boxing record ==
33 fights	29 wins	3 losses
By knockout	21	3
By decision	8	0
Draws	1	

No.	Result	Record	Opponent	Type	Round, time	Date	Location	Notes
33	Win	29–3–1	Azumah Nelson	MD	10	24 Jun 2008	Hisense Arena, Melbourne, Australia	
32	Loss	28–3–1	Phillip Holiday	TKO	2 (12), 2:18	18 May 1996	The Glass House, Melbourne, Australia	For IBF lightweight title
31	Win	28–2–1	Mike Juarez	TKO	2 (10), 2:06	9 Mar 1996	Melbourne Park, Melbourne, Australia	
30	Win	27–2–1	Tialano Tovar	TKO	8 (10), 2:31	18 Nov 1995	Convention Center, Atlantic City, New Jersey, U.S.	
29	Loss	26–2–1	Calvin Grove	TKO	7 (10), 0:59	7 Jun 1993	International Tennis Centre, Melbourne, Australia	
28	Loss	26–1–1	Azumah Nelson	TKO	8 (12), 2:20	11 Mar 1992	Princes Park Football Ground, Melbourne, Australia	For WBC super-featherweight title
27	Win	26–0–1	Miguel Angel Francia	UD	10	13 Sep 1991	International Tennis Centre, Melbourne, Australia	
26	Draw	25–0–1	Azumah Nelson	SD	12	28 Jun 1991	Mirage Hotel & Casino, Las Vegas, Nevada, U.S.	For WBC super-featherweight title; WBC Retrospectively awarded title to Fenech 7 Nov 2022, after a recount
25	Win	25–0	John Kalbhenn	TKO	4 (10), 1:20	19 Jan 1991	Memorial Drive Tennis Centre, Adelaide, Australia	
24	Win	24–0	Mario Martinez	UD	12	24 Nov 1989	International Tennis Centre, Melbourne, Australia	
23	Win	23–0	Marcos Villasana	UD	12	8 Apr 1989	National Tennis Centre, Melbourne, Australia	Retained WBC featherweight title
22	Win	22–0	Georgie Navarro	TKO	5 (12), 1:41	11 Nov 1988	National Tennis Centre, Melbourne, Australia	Retained WBC featherweight title
21	Win	21–0	Tyrone Downes	TKO	5 (12), 1:07	12 Aug 1988	National Tennis Centre, Melbourne, Australia	Retained WBC featherweight title
20	Win	20–0	Victor Callejas	TKO	10 (12), 1:21	7 Mar 1988	Entertainment Centre, Sydney, Australia	Won vacant WBC featherweight title
19	Win	19–0	Osmar Alfredo Avila	KO	1 (10), 0:56	11 Dec 1987	Entertainment Centre, Sydney, Australia	
18	Win	18–0	Carlos Zarate	TD	4 (12), 3:00	16 Oct 1987	Hordern Pavilion, Sydney, Australia	Retained WBC super-bantamweight title
17	Win	17–0	Greg Richardson	KO	5 (12), 1:29	10 Jul 1987	Entertainment Centre, Sydney, Australia	Retained WBC super-bantamweight title
16	Win	16–0	Samart Payakaroon	KO	4 (12), 2:42	8 Jun 1987	Entertainment Centre, Sydney, Australia	Won WBC super-bantamweight title
15	Win	15–0	Tony Miller	UD	12	3 Apr 1987	Sports & Entertainment Centre, Melbourne, Australia	Won Australian featherweight title
14	Win	14–0	Steve McCrory	TKO	14 (15), 1:41	18 Jul 1986	Entertainment Centre, Sydney, Australia	Retained IBF bantamweight title
13	Win	13–0	Daniel Zaragoza	UD	10	11 Apr 1986	Entertainment Centre, Perth, Australia	
12	Win	12–0	Jerome Coffee	UD	15	2 Dec 1985	Entertainment Centre, Sydney, Australia	Retained IBF bantamweight title
11	Win	11–0	Kenny Butts	KO	2 (10)	4 Nov 1985	Festival Hall, Brisbane, Australia	
10	Win	10–0	Satoshi Shingaki	TKO	4 (15)	23 Aug 1985	State Sports Centre, Sydney, Australia	Retained IBF bantamweight title
9	Win	9–0	John Farrell	TKO	9 (10), 0:40	26 Jul 1985	Festival Hall, Brisbane, Australia	
8	Win	8–0	John Matienza	TKO	6 (10), 2:41	14 Jun 1985	Hordern Pavilion, Sydney, Australia	
7	Win	7–0	Satoshi Shingaki	TKO	9 (15), 2:43	26 Apr 1985	Hordern Pavilion, Sydney, Australia	Won IBF bantamweight title
6	Win	6–0	Rolando Navarro	TKO	4 (12)	4 Mar 1985	Hordern Pavilion, Sydney, Australia	
5	Win	5–0	Wayne Mulholland	TKO	5 (12)	1 Feb 1985	Dapto Rugby League Club, Dapto, Australia	Won vacant South Pacific & South Seas bantamweight title
4	Win	4–0	Iliesa Manila	KO	2 (10)	15 Dec 1984	National Indoor Stadium, Suva, Fiji	
3	Win	3–0	Junior Thompson	TKO	4 (10), 2:15	30 Nov 1984	Marrickville RSL Club, Sydney, Australia	Won vacant Australian super-flyweight title
2	Win	2–0	Percy Israel	TKO	7 (10), 1:38	26 Oct 1984	Marrickville RSL Club, Sydney, Australia	
1	Win	1–0	Bobby Williams	TKO	2 (10), 2:06	12 Oct 1984	Marrickville RSL Club, Sydney, Australia	

== Titles in boxing ==
=== Major world titles ===
- IBF bantamweight champion (118 lbs)
- WBC super bantamweight champion (122 lbs)
- WBC featherweight champion (126 lbs)
- WBC super featherweight champion (130 lbs) (Note: Retrospectively awarded the WBC super featherweight title on November 7, 2022 due to the controversial decision of his bout against Azumah Nelson on June 28, 1991.)

=== Regional/International titles ===
- Australian super flyweight champion (115 lbs)
- South Pacific bantamweight champion (118 lbs)
- South Seas bantamweight champion (118 lbs)
- Australian featherweight champion (126 lbs)

== See also ==
- List of boxing quadruple champions
- List of IBF world champions
- List of WBC world champions

== Notes and references ==
=== References ===
- Fenech, the official biography / Grantlee Kieza and Peter Muszkat (1988, ISBN 0-949853-15-1)
- Jeff Fenech: I love youse all / with Terry Smith (1993, ISBN 1-875481-37-0)
- Caricature portrait of Jeff Fenech, 1988 / Spooner
- Jeff Fenech during a training session, 1991 / David Mahony
- Jeff Fenech in tears ..., 1984 / Bruce Howard

Sporting positions
World boxing titles
Preceded by Satoshi Shingaki	IBF bantamweight champion 26 April 1985 – 10 February 1987; Vacated	Vacant Title next held by Kelvin Seabrooks
Preceded by Samart Payakaroon	WBC super-bantamweight champion 8 May 1987 – 27 January 1988; Vacated	Vacant Title next held by Daniel Zaragoza
Vacant Title last held by Azumah Nelson	WBC featherweight champion 7 March 1988 – 18 April 1990; Vacated	Vacant Title next held by Marcos Villasana
Awards
Preceded by Azumah Nelson	WBC super-featherweight champion 28 June 1991; WBC retroactively awarded title on 7 November 2022 after WBC's recount	N/A
