= Fausto García =

Mexican boxer (born 1956)

Personal information
- Full name: Fausto Daniel García Navarro
- Nationality: Mexican
- Born: 5 January 1956 (age 70)
- Height: 169 cm (5 ft 7 in)

Sport
- Sport: Boxing
Medal record
Men's boxing
Representing Mexico
Central American and Caribbean Games
Silver medal – second place	1974 Santo Domingo	-48 kg

Fausto Daniel García Navarro (Note: In this Spanish name, the first or paternal surname is García and the second or maternal family name is Navarro.) (born 5 January 1956) is a Mexican boxer. He competed in the men's flyweight event at the 1984 Summer Olympics.

He began promoting professional fights in 2003 and was named director of the WBC Amateur Program in 2019.
