= Redžep Redžepovski =

Macedonian boxer

Personal information
- Born: 14 December 1962 (age 63) Kumanovo, SR Macedonia, Yugoslavia
Medal record
Men's Boxing
Representing Yugoslavia
Olympic Games
Silver medal – second place	1984 Los Angeles	Flyweight

Redžep Redžepovski (Macedonian: Реџеп Реџеповски; born 14 December 1962) is a retired Macedonian flyweight boxer of ethnic Macedonian Turkish origin, who won silver medal for Yugoslavia in the flyweight division (< 51 kg) at the 1984 Summer Olympics in Los Angeles, California. In the final he was defeated by Steve McCrory of the United States.

During the preliminary rounds of the 1984 Olympics, Redžepovski scored a controversial win over Australia's Jeff Fenech, a future World Champion in four weight divisions. Fenech was initially given the decision, but after intervention by the Olympic Boxing Committee and a total recount, the decision was reversed with Redžepovski being awarded the win. Many of the other boxers and those in the press felt that Fenech had been unfairly robbed of a chance to win an Olympic medal and most boxing writers noted how political amateur boxing was, especially at the Olympic Games.

== Olympic results ==
- Defeated Sanguo Teraporn (Thailand) 3–2
- Defeated Pat Clinton (Great Britain) KO 2
- Defeated Jeff Fenech (Australia) 4–1
- Defeated Ibrahim Bilali (Kenya) 5–0
- Lost to Steve McCrory (United States) 1–4
