= Reiner Klimke =

German equestrian

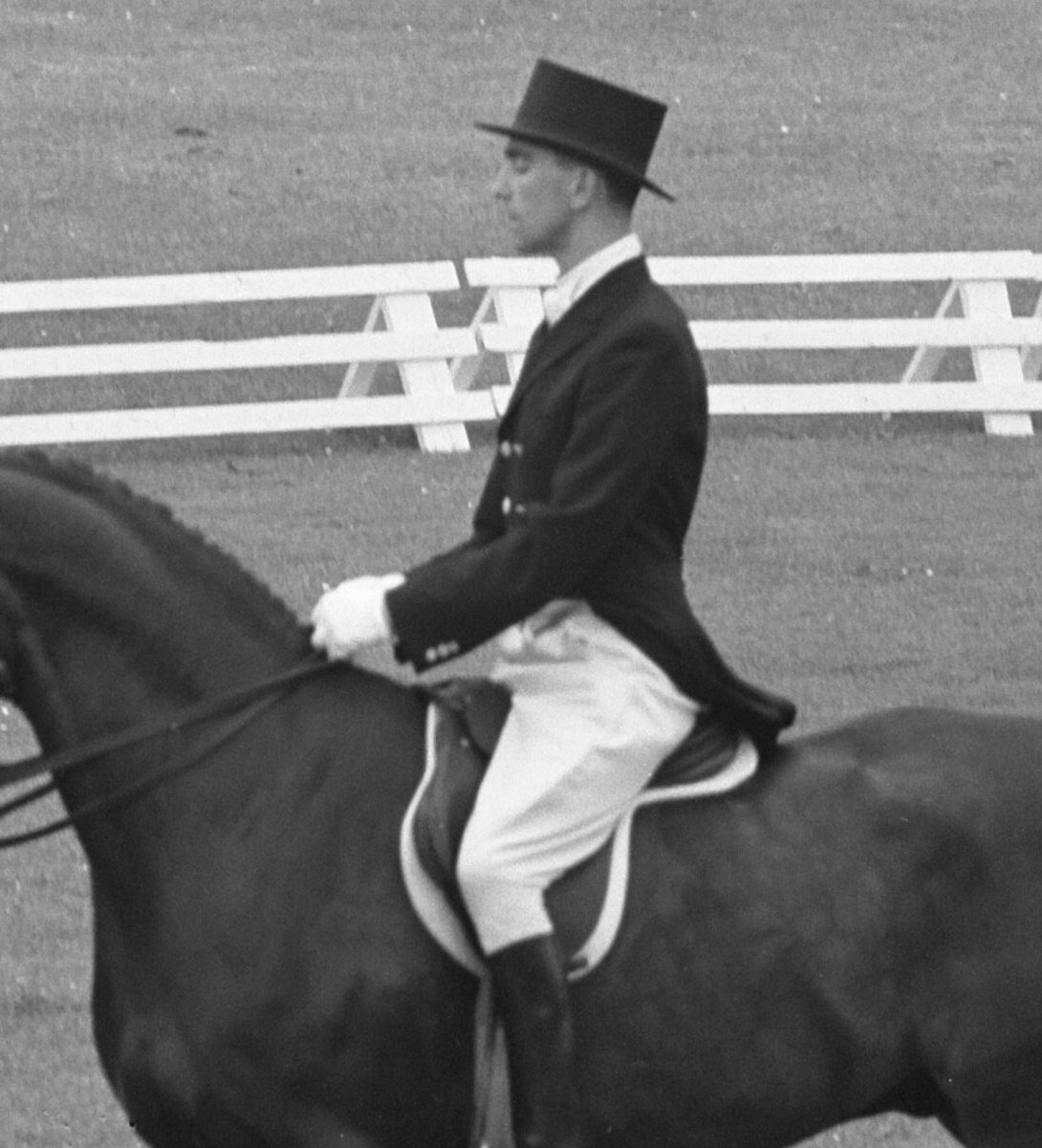
- Klimke in 1962

Personal information
- Born: January 14, 1936 Münster, Nazi Germany
- Died: August 17, 1999 (aged 63) Münster, Germany
- Height: 1.84 m (6 ft 0 in)
- Weight: 66 kg (146 lb)

Sport
- Sport: Equestrianism
- Club: RuF Gustav Rau, Telgte; RV St. Georg Münster
Medal record
Representing Germany
Olympic Games
Gold medal – first place	1964 Tokyo	Team dressage
Representing West Germany
Olympic Games
Gold medal – first place	1968 Mexico City	Team dressage
Gold medal – first place	1976 Montréal	Team dressage
Gold medal – first place	1984 Los Angeles	Team dressage
Gold medal – first place	1984 Los Angeles	Individual dressage
Gold medal – first place	1988 Seoul	Team dressage
Bronze medal – third place	1968 Mexico City	Individual dressage
Bronze medal – third place	1976 Montréal	Individual dressage
World Championships
Gold medal – first place	1966 Bern	Team dressage
Gold medal – first place	1974 Copenhagen	Individual dressage
Gold medal – first place	1974 Copenhagen	Team dressage
Gold medal – first place	1982 Lausanne	Individual dressage
Gold medal – first place	1982 Lausanne	Team dressage
Gold medal – first place	1986 Cedar Valley	Team dressage
Bronze medal – third place	1966 Bern	Individual dressage
European Championships
Gold medal – first place	1959 Harewood	Team eventing
Gold medal – first place	1965 Copenhagen	Team dressage
Gold medal – first place	1967 Aachen	Individual dressage
Gold medal – first place	1967 Aachen	Team dressage
Gold medal – first place	1969 Wolfsburg	Team dressage
Gold medal – first place	1971 Wolfsburg	Team dressage
Gold medal – first place	1973 Klew	Individual dressage
Gold medal – first place	1973 Klew	Team dressage
Gold medal – first place	1981 Laxenburg	Team dressage
Gold medal – first place	1983 Aachen	Team dressage
Gold medal – first place	1985 Copenhagen	Individual dressage
Gold medal – first place	1985 Copenhagen	Team dressage
Silver medal – second place	1957 Copenhagen	Team eventing
Silver medal – second place	1983 Aachen	Individual dressage
Bronze medal – third place	1965 Copenhagen	Individual dressage

Reiner Klimke (German pronunciation: [ˈʁaɪnɐ ˈklɪmkə]; 14 January 1936 – 17 August 1999) was a German equestrian, who won six gold and two bronze medals in dressage at the Summer Olympics — a record for equestrian events that has since been surpassed. He appeared in six Olympics from 1960 to 1988, excluding the 1980 Games that were boycotted by West Germany.

== Equestrian career ==
Klimke studied Harry Boldt and Gustaf Rau.

He won team gold in 1964, 1968 (both on Dux), 1976 (riding Mehmed), 1984 and 1988 (both with Ahlerich), and the individual gold in 1984 on Ahlerich. He is the most recent man to win Olympic gold in dressage.

His two bronze medals came in the individual event in 1968 and 1976. Klimke also had a fine record at the World Championships, winning six gold medals: two individual, in 1974 on Mehmed and in 1982 on Ahlerich, and four team: 1966, 1974, 1982, 1986.

At the European Championships, he was the individual champion in 1967, 1973, and 1985 and rode on seven winning West German teams (1965, 1973, 1983, 1985, and others) . Klimke also competed in eventing early in his career. He was a member of the winning West German three-day event team at the 1959 European Championships, and finished 18th in individual eventing at the 1960 Summer Olympics, making him the best German combination. He also won a Grand Prix show jumping competition in Berlin.

== Personal life ==
Reiner Klimke was the son of a psychologist and a neurologist. With his wife, Ruth (also a top show jumping and dressage rider), he had three children: Ingrid, Rolf, and Michael. Ingrid competes in eventing and dressage; she won a gold medal at the 2008 Summer Olympics, twenty years after her father's last Olympic gold. Michael also competes at the Grand Prix level in dressage.

Klimke not only rode and trained, but also ran a law firm and served on several boards, including the FEI Dressage Committee. Klimke died from a heart attack at age 63 in Münster, his place of birth. Prior to his death, he had planned to start at the 2000 Summer Olympics.

== Publications ==
- Cavaletti: Ausbildung von Reiter und Pferd über Bodenricks Stuttgart: Franckh 1966
- Military: Geschichte, Training, Wettkampf Stuttgart: Franckh 1967, "Eventing"
- Cavalletti: Schooling of Horse and Rider over Ground Rails (translation of Cavaletti by Daphne Machin Goodall) London: J.A. Allen 1969
- Le Concours complet: histoire, entraînement, compétition (translation of Military by Pierre André) Paris: Crépin-Leblond 1977
- Grundausbildung des jungen Reitpferdes: von der Fohlenerziehung bis zum ersten Turnierstart Stuttgart: Franckh 1980
- Horse trials (translation of Military by Daphne Machin Goodall) London: J.A. Allen 1984
- Ahlerich von der Remonte zum Dressur-Weltmeister; ein exemplarischer Ausbildungsweg Stuttgart: Franckh 1984
- Basic Training of the Young Horse: From the Education of the Young Foal to the First Competition (translation of Grundausbildung by Sigrid Young) London: J.A. Allen 1985
- Ahlerich: The Making of a Dressage World Champion (translation of Ahlerich by Courtney Searls-Ridge) Gaithersburg, MD: Half Halt Press 1986
- Von der Schönheit der Dressur vom jungen Pferd bis zum Grand Prix Stuttgart: Franckh-Kosmos 1991
- Klimke on Dressage: From the Young Horse Through Grand Prix (translation of the above by Courtney Searls-Ridge and Jan Spauschus Johnson) Middletown, MD: Half Halt Press 1992

== See also ==
- List of multiple Olympic gold medalists
- List of multiple Olympic gold medalists in one event
- List of athletes with the most appearances at Olympic Games
- List of writers on horsemanship
