= Svetlana Mugoša-Antić =

Yugoslavian handball player (born 1964)

Personal information
- Nationality: Yugoslav / Austrian / Montenegrin
- Born: 13 November 1964 (age 61) Titograd, SFR Yugoslavia
- Height: 1.87 m (6 ft 2 in)

Sport
- Sport: Handball
- Position: Pivot
- Current club: Retired

Senior clubs
- Years: Team
- 1979-1989: ŽRK Budućnost Podgorica
- 1989-1990: ŽRK Voždovac Belgrade
- 1990-1992: Hypo NÖ
- 1992-1994: USM Gagny
- 1995-1996: CS Noisy-le-Grand
- 1996-2000: AS Bondy
- 2000-2003: ESBF Besançon
National team
| Years | Team | Apps |
| 1984-1992 | Yugoslavia | 153 |
| – | Austria | 45 |
Medal record
Representing Yugoslavia
Women's Handball
| Gold medal – first place | 1984 Los Angeles | Team |
World Championship
| Silver medal – second place | 1990 South Korea | Team |
Representing Austria
World Championship
| Bronze medal – third place | 1999 Denmark/Norway | Team |

Svetlana Antić, née Mugoša (born 13 November 1964, in Titograd, SR Montenegro, SFR Yugoslavia), is a first Yugoslav and then Austrian handball player who competed in the 1984 Summer Olympics and in the 1988 Summer Olympics.

== National team ==
=== Yugoslavia ===
In the 1984 Olympics, she was a member of the Yugoslav handball team, which won the gold medal. She played three matches and scored two goals. Four years later, she was part of the Yugoslav team that finished fourth. She played all five matches and scored 15 goals.

At the 1990 World Women's Handball Championship she won a silver medal with Yugoslavia, losing to the Soviet Union in the final 24-22.

She also represented Yugoslavia at the 1986 World Women's Handball Championship, where they finished 6th.

=== Austria ===
She later chose to represent Austria, where she won a bronze medal at the 1999 World Women's Handball Championship.

She also competed in the women's tournament at the 2000 Summer Olympics, representing Austria, where they finished 5th.

== Club handball ==
=== In Yugoslavia ===
Between 1979 and 1989 she played for Buducnost Titograd. In 1981 she helped the team getting promoted to the Yugoslav first league. In 1984 she won the Yugoslav cup beating ŽRK Olimpija Ljubljana in the final 24-21, and the year later she won the Yugoslav Championship. Two years later she won the 1986–87 Women's IHF Cup with the club. In 1989 she won the Yugoslav Championship and Cup once again, and then joined ŽRK Voždovac Belgrade.

=== In Austria ===
A year later she joined the Austrian top team Hypo Niederösterreich. In 1991 she won the Austrian Championship and Cup double and in 1992 she won the treble, including the 1991-92 EHF Women's Champions League.

=== In France ===
Between 1992 and 1994 she played for USM Gagny, where she won the 1993 Coupe de France.

She then took a year's break from handball, and joined CS Noisy-Le-Grand in 1995. A year later she joined AS Bondy.

In 2000 she joined Entente Sportive Bisontine Féminin in the top league. Here she won the 2001 and 2003 French Championship and the 2001, 2002 and 2003 French Cup. She retired in 2003.

== Titles ==
- EHF Champions League:
  - Winner: 1992
  - Second place: 1991
- EHF Cup Winners' Cup:
  - Winner: 1985, 2003
- IHF Cup:
  - Winner: 1987
- Yugoslav Championship:
  - Winner:1985, 1989
- Yugoslav Cup:
  - Winner:1984, 1989
- Austrian Championship:
  - Winner:1991, 1992
- Austrian Cup:
  - Winner:1991, 1992
- French Championship:
  - Winner: 2001, 2003
  - Second place: 1993, 1994
- French Cup:
  - Winner: 1993, 2001, 2002, 2003
- Coupe de la Ligue:
  - Winner: 2003

== Private ==
She is the sister of Ljiljana Mugoša, who also played on the 1984 Gold winning team. They also played together at USM Gagny.
