= Slavica Đukić =

Austrian handball player (born 1960)

Olympic medal record

Women's Handball
Gold medal – first place	1984 Los Angeles	Team

Slavica Đukić (Serbian Cyrillic: Славица Ђукић, German: Slavica Djukic, born 7 January 1960 in Veliko Gradište, Serbia, FPR Yugoslavia) is a former Yugoslav/Austrian handball player who competed in the 1984 Summer Olympics, in the 1988 Summer Olympics, and in the 1992 Summer Olympics.

In 1984 she was a member of the Yugoslav handball team which won the gold medal. She played four matches as goalkeeper. Four years later she was part of the Yugoslav team which finished fourth. She played all five matches as goalkeeper. In 1992 she represented Austria at the Summer Olympics, finishing in fifth place.
