= Bill Dunlop =

Canadian boxer (born 1963)

Bill Dunlop (born November 19, 1963, in Montreal, Quebec) is a retired boxer from Canada, who competed for his native country at the 1984 Summer Olympics in Los Angeles, California. There he was defeated in the first round of the men's flyweight (– 51 kg) division by Turkey's eventual bronze medalist Eyüp Can. He also represented Canada at the 1983 Pan American Games.

== 1984 Olympic results ==
Below is the record of Bill Dunlop, a Canadian flyweight boxer who competed at the 1984 Los Angeles Olympics:

- Round of 32: lost to Eyüp Can (Egypt) by decision, 0-5
