= David Mwaba =

Tanzanian boxer

Personal information
- Nationality: Tanzanian

Sport
- Sport: Boxing

David Mwaba is a Tanzanian boxer. He competed in the men's flyweight event at the 1984 Summer Olympics.
