= Pat Clinton =

Scottish boxer

Personal information
- Nationality: Scottish
- Born: 4 April 1964 (age 62) Croy, Lanarkshire, Scotland
- Height: 5 ft 3 in (160 cm)
- Weight: Flyweight

Boxing career

Boxing record
- Total fights: 23
- Wins: 20
- Win by KO: 9
- Losses: 3
- Draws: 0
Medal record
Men's boxing
Representing Scotland
Commonwealth Championships
| Gold medal – first place | 1983 Belfast | Flyweight |

Patrick "Pat" Clinton (born 4 April 1964) is a Scottish former professional boxer who competed from 1985 to 1994. He held the WBO flyweight title from 1992 to 1993. At regional level, he held the British flyweight title from 1988 to 1999, and the EBU European title in 1990.

== Career ==
=== Amateur ===
Born and raised in Croy, Scotland, one of ten children, his father Billy was a former Scottish professional champion and his uncle Jim an amateur champion.

He was a member of Croy Miners Amateur Boxing Club. Clinton represented Great Britain as a Flyweight at the 1984 Olympic Games in Los Angeles. Results were:

- Round of 32: Defeated Leonard Makhanya (Swaziland) by decision, 5–0
- Round of 16: Lost to Redzep Redzepovski (Yugoslavia) by second-round knockout

Clinton was also the Amateur Boxing Association of England flyweight champion in 1984 and 1985.

=== Professional ===
Clinton turned professional in 1985, his first pro fight a points victory over Gordon Stobie in October that year. After winning his first eleven fights, he won his first title in September 1987, stopping Joe Kelly to take the vacant BBBofC Scottish Area flyweight title. In his next fight he again faced Kelly with Clinton's Scottish Area title and the vacant British title at stake. Clinton won on points this time to become British champion.

In February 1989, Clinton faced Eyüp Can for the vacant European title, losing a unanimous decision. He made successful defences of his British title against Danny Porter and David Afan Jones before getting a second shot at the European title in August 1990; Clinton took a majority decision against Salvatore Fanni in Cagliari to take the vacant European title.

In March 1992, Clinton challenged for the WBO world flyweight title held by Isidro Pérez at the Kelvin Hall in Glasgow. Clinton took a split decision to become WBO world champion. In September 1992 he successfully defended the world title against Porter, but lost it in May 1993 when he was stopped by Jacob Matlala in the eighth round at the Scottish Exhibition Centre.

Clinton was out of the ring for eleven months, returning in April 1994 to face Adey Benton. Benton stopped him in the first round, in what proved to be Clinton's final fight. He retired at the age of 30 with a professional record of 20 wins and three losses.

In his thirties, as a result of perforated eardrums suffered during his boxing career, Clinton suffered tinnitus and started to lose his hearing, and had to start wearing a hearing aid at the age of 33. He returned to his trade as a joiner before going on to work as a salesman for British Gas.

Achievements
| Preceded by Isidro Perez | WBO flyweight champion 18 March 1992 – 15 May 1993 | Succeeded by Jacob Matlala |
