= Herbert Krug =

German equestrian (1937–2010)

Medal record

Equestrian

Representing West Germany

Olympic Games
Gold medal – first place	1984 Los Angeles	Team dressage

World Championships
Gold medal – first place	1986 Cedar Valley	Team dressage

European Championships
Gold medal – first place	1983 Aachen	Team dressage
Gold medal – first place	1987 Goodwood	Team dressage

Herbert Krug (21 June 1937 – 1 November 2010) was a German equestrian and Olympic champion. He won a gold medal in team dressage at the 1984 Summer Olympics in Los Angeles. He was born in Mainz and died in Hochheim am Main.
