= Ingamay Bylund =

Swedish equestrian (1947–2025)

Personal information
- Nationality: Swedish
- Born: 25 September 1947 Söderhamn, Sweden
- Died: 11 November 2025 (aged 78) Varberg, Sweden

Sport
- Sport: Equestrian
Medal record
Equestrian
Representing Sweden
Olympic Games
| Bronze medal – third place | 1984 Los Angeles | Team dressage |

Ingamay Bylund (25 September 1947 – 11 November 2025) was a Swedish equestrian and Olympic medalist. She was born in Söderhamn. She won a bronze medal in dressage at the 1984 Summer Olympics in Los Angeles.

Bylund died from complications of COVID-19 on 11 November 2025, at the age of 78.
