= Zorica Pavićević =

Yugoslav handball player (born 1956)

Olympic medal record

Women's Handball
Gold medal – first place	1984 Los Angeles	Team

Zorica Pavićević, née Dragović (born 9 May 1956 in Danilovgrad, Montenegro) is a former Yugoslav handball player who competed in the 1984 Summer Olympics.

She was a member of the Yugoslav handball team which won the gold medal. She played four matches and scored two goals.
