= Ljiljana Mugoša =

Handball player (born 1962)

Ljiljana Vučević
Personal information
- Nationality: Montenigrin
- Born: 10 April 1962 (age 64) Titograd, SFR Yugoslavia
- Height: 1.81 m (5 ft 11 in)

Sport
- Sport: Handball
- Position: Centre back
- Current club: Retired

Senior clubs
- Years: Team
- 1976-1988: ŽRK Budućnost Podgorica
- 1988-1989: ŽRK Voždovac Belgrade
- 1989-1993: USM Gagny
National team
- Years: Team
- –: Yugoslavia
Medal record
Women's Handball
Gold medal – first place	1984 Los Angeles	Team
World Championship
Bronze medal – third place	1982 Hungary	Team

Ljiljana Vučević, née Mugoša (born April 10, 1962 in Titograd, PR Montenegro, FPR Yugoslavia), is a former Yugoslav handball player who competed in the 1984 Summer Olympics and in the 1988 Summer Olympics.

In 1984, she was a member of the Yugoslav handball team which won the gold medal. She played four matches and scored four goals.

Four years later she was part of the Yugoslav team which finished fourth. She played all five matches and scored five goals.

She is the sister of Svetlana Mugoša-Antić, who also played on the 1984 Gold winning team. They also played together at USM Gagny.
