= Chen King-ming =

Taiwanese boxer

Personal information
- Full name: 陳 金銘, Pinyin: Chén Jīn-míng
- Nationality: Taiwanese
- Born: 1 May 1958 (age 66)

Sport
- Sport: Boxing

Chen King-ming (born 1 May 1958) is a Taiwanese boxer. He competed in the men's flyweight event at the 1984 Summer Olympics.
