= Heo Yong-mo =

South Korean boxer (1965–2019)

Medal record

Representing South Korea

Men's Boxing

World Amateur Championships
Bronze medal – third place	1982 Munich	Light Flyweight

Asian Games
Gold medal – first place	1982 New Delhi	Light Flyweight

Asian Amateur Championships
Gold medal – first place	1982 Seoul	Light Flyweight
Gold medal – first place	1987 Kuwait	Bantamweight

Heo Yong-Mo (April 21, 1965 – March 9, 2019) was a South Korean amateur boxer.

== Career ==
He won a Light Flyweight bronze medal at the 1982 World Amateur Boxing Championships.

Heo captured a Flyweight silver medal in the 1983 Boxing World Cup in Rome, Italy, beating Australian boxing legend Jeff Fenech by unanimous decision in the semifinals.

Next year, Heo participated in the 1984 Summer Olympics. However, he, in a major upset, lost to Eyüp Can of Turkey by split decision in the quarterfinals.

Heo served as a middle school teacher in Yeosu, Jeollanam-do.

== Results ==
1981 Boxing World Cup
Event	Round	Result	Opponent	Score
Light Flyweight	Quarterfinal	bye		
Light Flyweight	Semifinal	Win	(Philippines) Gil Jamile	5–0
Light Flyweight	Final	Loss	(Bulgaria) Ismail Mustafov	0–5

1982 World Championships
Event	Round	Result	Opponent	Score
Light Flyweight	First	bye		
Light Flyweight	Second	Win	(Romania) Sandu Petrescu	5–0
Light Flyweight	Quarterfinal	Win	(Kenya) Ibrahim Bilali	4–1
Light Flyweight	Semifinal	Loss	(Bulgaria) Ismail Mustafov	1–4

1983 Boxing World Cup
Event	Round	Result	Opponent	Score
Flyweight	Quarterfinal	Win	(Kenya) Ibrahim Bilali	RSC 1
Flyweight	Semifinal	Win	(Australia) Jeff Fenech	5–0
Flyweight	Final	Loss	(Cuba) Pedro Orlando Reyes	1–4

1984 Summer Olympics
Event	Round	Result	Opponent	Score
Flyweight	First	Win	(Egypt) Fayek Gobran	RSC 1
Flyweight	Second	Win	(Philippines) Efreen Tabanas	4–1
Flyweight	Quarterfinal	Loss	(Turkey) Eyüp Can	1–4
