= Oppe Pinto =

Paraguayan boxer

Personal information
- Nationality: Paraguayan
- Born: 30 April 1963 (age 61)

Sport
- Sport: Boxing

Oppe Pinto (born 30 April 1963) is a Paraguayan boxer. He competed in the men's flyweight event at the 1984 Summer Olympics.
