= Ljubinka Janković =

Serbian handball player (born 1958)

Olympic medal record

Women's Handball
Gold medal – first place	1984 Los Angeles	Team

Ljubinka Janković (born 23 September 1958 in Badovinci village near Bogatić, Serbia, former Yugoslavia) is a former Yugoslav handball player who competed in the 1984 Summer Olympics and in the 1988 Summer Olympics.

In 1984 she was a member of the Yugoslav handball team that won the gold medal. She played all five matches and scored six goals.

Four years later, she was part of the Yugoslav team that finished fourth. She played all five matches and scored ten goals.
