= Amy-Cathérine de Bary =

Swiss equestrian (born 1944)

Medal record

Equestrian

Representing Switzerland

Olympic Games
| Silver medal – second place | 1984 Los Angeles | Team dressage |

European Championships
| Silver medal – second place | 1981 Laxenburg | Team dressage |
| Bronze medal – third place | 1979 Aarhus | Team dressage |
| Bronze medal – third place | 1983 Aachen | Team dressage |

Amy-Cathérine de Bary (born 29 January 1944) is a Swiss equestrian and Olympic medalist. She competed in dressage at the 1984 Summer Olympics in Los Angeles, where she won a silver medal with the Swiss team.
