= Manuel Cid =

Mexican equestrian

Personal information
- Nationality: Mexican
- Born: 19 August 1956 (age 69)

Sport
- Sport: Equestrian
Medal record
Equestrian
Representing Mexico
Pan American Games
Silver medal – second place	1983 Caracas	Team dressage

Manuel Cid (born 19 August 1956) is a Mexican equestrian. He competed in two events at the 1984 Summer Olympics.
