= Álvaro Mercado =

Colombian boxer

Personal information
- Nationality: Colombian
- Born: 18 October 1964 (age 60); Barranquilla, Colombia

Sport
- Sport: Boxing

Álvaro Mercado (born 18 October 1964) is a Colombian boxer. He competed in the men's flyweight event at the 1984 Summer Olympics.
