= Seiki Segawa =

Japanese boxer

Personal information
- Nationality: Japanese
- Born: 8 November 1961 (age 63)

Sport
- Sport: Boxing

Seiki Segawa (瀬川 正義, Segawa Seiki; born 8 November 1961) is a Japanese boxer. He competed in the men's flyweight event at the 1984 Summer Olympics.
