= Ahlerich =

Olympics dressage–winning horse

- Breed: Westphalian
- Sire: Angelo (Thoroughbred)
- Grandsire: Oliveri (Thoroughbred)
- Dam: Dodona (Westphalian)
- Maternal grandsire: Donar (Westphalian)
- Sex: Gelding
- Foaled: 1971

Olympic medal record

Equestrian
Gold medal – first place	1988 Seoul	Team dressage
Gold medal – first place	1984 Los Angeles	Team dressage
Gold medal – first place	1984 Los Angeles	Individual dressage

Ahlerich (1971–1992) was a Westphalian gelding. With his rider Reiner Klimke, he won the 1984 and 1988 team gold medals in Olympic Grand Prix dressage and the individual gold in 1984.

In 1975, Klimke purchased Ahlerich at auction in Warendorf for a record-breaking 42.000 DM (roughly $26,600).

He is the subject of a book written by Klimke, Ahlerich von der Remonte zum Dressur-Weltmeister; ein exemplarischer Ausbildungsweg (1984), published in translation by Courtney Searls-Ridge as Ahlerich: The Making of a Dressage World Champion in 1986.
