= Laureano Ramírez =

Dominican Republic boxer (born 1965)

Personal information
- Born: December 24, 1965 (age 60)
Medal record
Men's Boxing
Representing the Dominican Republic
Pan American Games
Silver medal – second place	1983 Caracas	Flyweight
Central American and Caribbean Games
Silver medal – second place	1986 Santiago	Flyweight

Laureano Ramírez Padilla (born December 24, 1965, in San Pedro de Macorís) is a retired Dominican boxer, who represented his native country at the 1984 Summer Olympics in Los Angeles in the Men's Flyweight division.

Ramírez won the silver medal in the same weight category a year earlier at the 1983 Pan American Games. In the final he was defeated by Cuba's Pedro Orlando Reyes.

== 1984 Olympic results ==
Below are the results of Laureano Ramirez, a flyweight boxer from the Dominican Republic, who competed at the 1984 Los Angeles Olympics:

- Round of 32: defeated Oscar Carballo (Argentina) referee stopped contest in second round
- Round of 16: defeated Jose Rodriguez (Puerto Rico) by decision, 5-0
- Quarterfinal: lost to Ibrahim Bilali (Kenya) by decision, 0-5
