= Tad Joseph =

Grenadian boxer (born 1963)

Taddeus Joseph
Personal information
- Full name: Taddeus Joseph
- Nickname: "Tad"
- Born: February 23, 1963 (age 63)
- Height: 1.57 m (5 ft 2 in)
- Weight: 53 kg (117 lb)

Sport
- Country: Grenada
- Sport: Boxing

Thaddeus "Tad" Joseph (born February 23, 1963) is retired male amateur boxer from Grenada, who fought at the 1988 Summer Olympics in the men's Bantamweight division. He also represented Grenada at the 1987 Pan American Games.

== 1988 Olympic results ==
Below is the record of Tad Joseph, a bantamweight boxer from Grenada who competed at the 1988 Seoul Olympics:

- Round of 64: lost to Jose Garcia (Mexico) referee stopped contest in the first round
