= Bonny Chesson =

Canadian equestrian

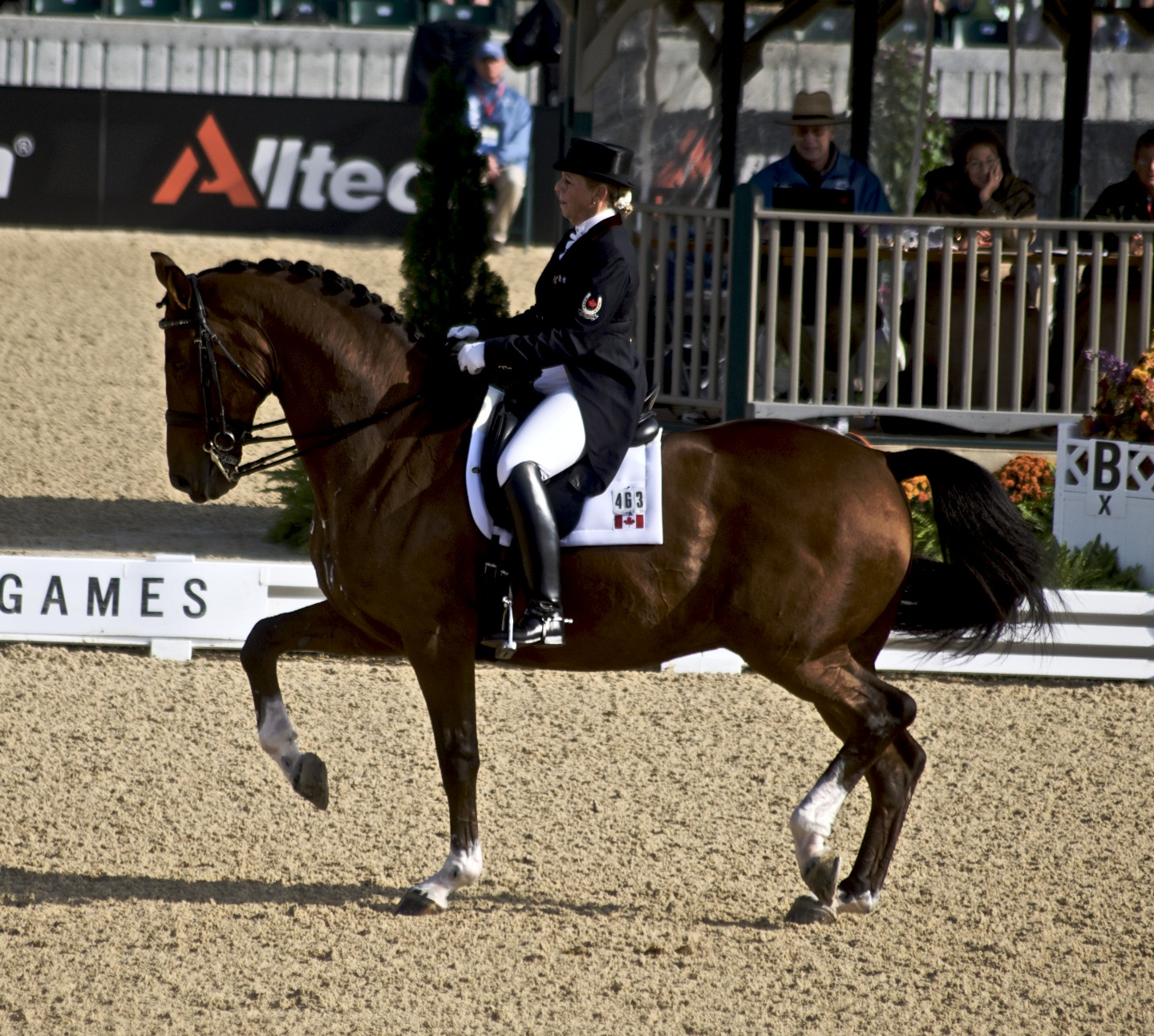
- Chesson riding Pikardi (2010)

Personal information
- Nationality: Canadian
- Born: 17 December 1950 (age 74); Newark, England

Sport
- Sport: Equestrian

Bonny Chesson (born 17 December 1950) is a Canadian equestrian. She competed in two events at the 1984 Summer Olympics.
