= Peter Ebinger =

Austrian equestrian

Personal information
- Nationality: Austrian
- Born: 10 October 1958; Vienna, Austria
- Died: 24 August 2015 (aged 56); Vienna, Austria

Sport
- Sport: Equestrian

Peter Ebinger (10 October 1958 – 24 August 2015) was an Austrian equestrian. He competed in two events at the 1984 Summer Olympics.
