= Christopher Bartle =

British equestrian (born 1952)

Christopher Bartle FBHS
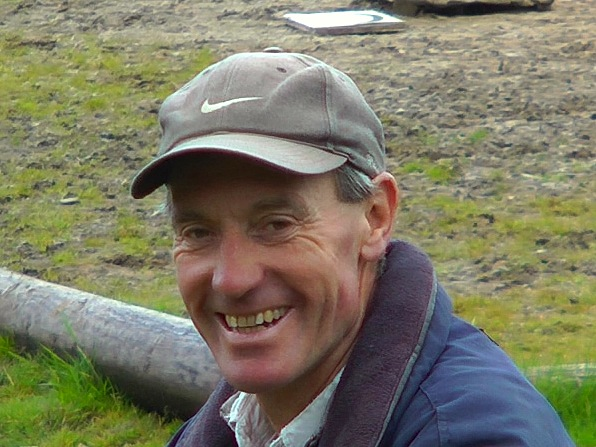

Personal information
- Full name: Christopher John Bartle
- Nationality: England
- Born: 19 February 1952 (age 74) Harrogate
- Height: 5 ft 11 in (1.80 m)
- Weight: 143 lb (65 kg; 10.2 st)

Sport
- Country: Great Britain
- Sport: Equestrianism
- Event(s): Dressage, Eventing
- Turned pro: 1976
- Coached by: Mrs Nicole Bartle, Hans von Blixen-Finecke, Jr.
- Retired: 2003

Achievements and titles
- Olympic finals: 6th - 84' Los Angeles (Holds British Record)
- World finals: 2nd - 1992 Nashua Dressage World Cup
- National finals: 1st - 1984, 1985
- Personal best: Individual C'ship Dressage - 6th (1984, NR)

Christopher Bartle
Medal record

Eventing

Representing Great Britain

European Eventing Championships
Gold medal – first place	1997 Burghley	Team Eventing

Christopher Bartle, FBHS (born 19 February 1952 in Harrogate, West Riding of Yorkshire) is a British equestrian who has enjoyed success in both Dressage and Eventing. He is currently the Managing Director of the Yorkshire Riding Centre and Performance Coach to the British Three Day Event Squad. Chris Bartle was a member of the British Dressage Team from 1981 to 1987 and was placed 6th in individual dressage in the 1984 Los Angeles Olympics. From 2001 to 2016, together with Hans Melzer, he was the German Three Day Eventing National Team Trainer. Chris is the brother of Jane Bartle-Wilson, who was also an Olympian in the '84 Los Angeles Olympics.

== Early years ==
Chris Bartle was educated at Ampleforth College and at the University of Bristol where he obtained a BSc (Econ) with honours in Economics. After university Chris was an amateur jockey, but being 5 ft 11, struggled to keep his weight down in order to establish himself. This prompted his first spell in three-day eventing. He was initially trained by his mother, Mrs Nicole Bartle and then later by Hans von Blixen-Finecke, Jr., who was double gold medalist at the 1952 Helsinki Olympics in Three Day Eventing.

== Competitor ==
=== Dressage ===
While preparing for the 1976 Burghley Horse Trials Bartle's horse, Wily Trout, picked up a tendon injury that forced the horse into retirement from eventing. However, Wily Trout showed potential in dressage. One year later Bartle was competing at the World Championships as an individual. The combination went on to become part of the British Dressage Team from 1981–1987. In this time Bartle competed at the '84 Summer Olympics in Los Angeles for the British team. The team came 8th, but Chris Bartle tied for 6th in the individual event to make history by becoming the highest placed British rider, a record he still held as of January 2011. Chris and Wily Trout's last major contribution in dressage came when they were placed 2nd at the first Dressage World Cup Final in 's-Hertogenbosch 1986. This period was capped off when Bartle was awarded the British Equestrian Federation's Medal of Honour in 1986.

=== Three Day Eventing ===
Bartle then took the opportunity to turn back to eventing and had a whole host of successes which included winning team Gold at the 1997 European Championships with the British Event Team, before winning the prestigious Badminton Horse Trials in 1998, on Word Perfect II, owned by Elaine and Adrian Cantwell. He also travelled with Word Perfect to the Sydney Olympics in 2000, as reserve.

== Past Rides ==
- Dressage - Wily Trout & Honey Tangle
- Eventing - Wily Trout, Up River, Castle Hill, Word Perfect II, Oscar

== Trainer ==
=== British National Team ===
After his successful dressage period, Bartle was invited to train the British Eventing Team, with whom he went to the 1996 Atlanta and 2000 Sydney Olympic games. In 1995 Christopher Bartle received the British Horse Society's Trainers Award, and in 2001 was awarded Honorary Fellowship of the British Horse Society. In 2016 Chris Bartle was appointed to the new role of Performance Coach to the British Evening Team.

=== German National Team ===
From 2001 to 2016 Chris was the National Coach to the German Olympic Three Day Event Team - Winners of Team and Individual Gold medals at the Beijing Olympics in 2008, with Michael Jung also becoming Individual World Champion, Kentucky 2010. His experience led to him write Training the Sport Horse, which he co-authored with Gilliam Newsum. The book was published by J. A. Allen in 2004.

=== Training Individuals ===
Locally Christopher Bartle trains many British International level riders, notably for many years the British team rider Nicola Wilson from Northallerton, North Yorkshire.

== Yorkshire Riding Centre ==
Bartle has been the Managing Director and resident instructor at the Yorkshire Riding Centre in Markington near Harrogate for many years, sharing his wealth of knowledge. He does not exclusively teach international or high level competition riders, and is known to teach developing riders on their own horses.

== Accomplishments ==
Dressage

- Highest placed British Dressage rider in the Olympic Games to date (6th, 1984 Los Angeles Olympics)
- National Dressage Champion in 1984 and 1985
- 4th place at the 1985 European Championships
- 2nd place at the 1986 Nashua Dressage World Cup
- Awarded the British Equestrian Federation's Medal of Honour in 1986.

Eventing

- 1991 Scottish Open Champion (Up River)
- Placed at 1995 Burghley CCI**** (Castle Hill)
- 3rd at 1996 Blenheim ***
- 5th at 1996 Bramham ***
- Completed 1997 Badminton ****
- 1997 Scottish Open Champion (Word Perfect)
- Team Gold Medal at the 1997 European Championships
- 1st at the 1998 Badminton Horse Trials CCI**** (Word Perfect)
- 1st at the 1999 Achselschwang Horse Trials *** (Oscar)
- 5th at the 2000 Burghley **** (Word Perfect)
- Reserve for Sydney 2000 British Event Team (Word Perfect)

Training

- Was awarded the British Horse Society's Trainers Award in 1995
- Dressage Trainer to British Event Team at the 1996 Atlanta and 2000 Sydney Games
- German National Trainer Eventing since 2001 (together with Hans Melzer)
- Was awarded Honorary Fellowship of the British Horse Society (FBHS) in 2001

== Citations ==
1.^ https://web.archive.org/web/20120724093044/http://yrc.co.uk/instructor/christopher-bartle-fbhs

2.^ a b Murphy "Bartle finds right lines" The Independent

3.^ "Training the Sport Horse" Amazon.com [edit] References
