= Margarita Nava =

Mexican equestrian (1944–2025)

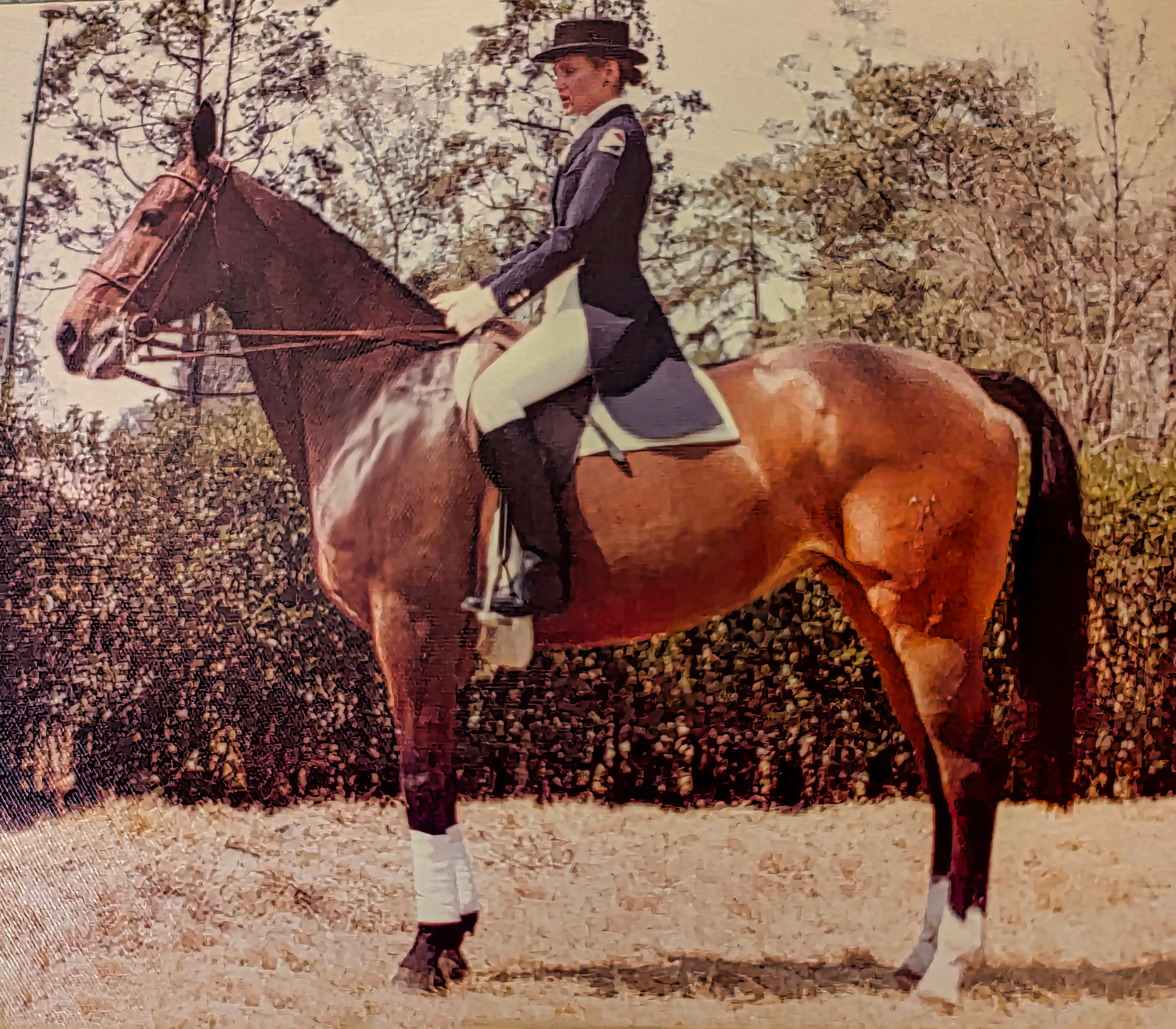

Personal information
- Full name: Margarita Nava Sánchez
- Nationality: Mexican
- Born: 17 April 1944
- Died: 6 August 2025 (aged 81)
Medal record
Equestrian
Representing Mexico
Pan American Games
Silver medal – second place	1983 Caracas	Team dressage
Bronze medal – third place	1987 Indianapolis	Individual dressage
Bronze medal – third place	1987 Indianapolis	Team dressage
Bronze medal – third place	1991 Havana	Team dressage

Margarita Nava (17 October 1944 – 6 August 2025) was a Mexican equestrian. Through Dressage she represented her country in Europe and South America from 1980 – 2000. From the 1970s she promoted riding as a way of life, therapy and sport. She competed in two events at the 1984 Summer Olympics. Nava died in August 2025, at the age of 79.

Nava died on 6 August 2025, at the age of 79.
