= René Centellas =

Bolivian boxer (born 1960)

René Centellas (born 31 May 1960) is a former boxer from Bolivia, who competed in the flyweight (- 51 kg) division at the 1984 Summer Olympics. Centellas lost his opening bout to Jeff Fenech of Australia.
