= Marie-Louise Castenskiold =

Danish equestrian

Personal information
- Nationality: Danish
- Born: 10 November 1960 (age 64); Holbæk, Denmark

Sport
- Sport: Equestrian

Marie-Louise Castenskiold (born 10 November 1960) is a Danish equestrian. She competed in two events at the 1984 Summer Olympics.
