= Christa Winkel =

Austrian equestrian

Personal information
- Nationality: Austrian
- Born: 28 April 1959 (age 65)

Sport
- Sport: Equestrian

Christa Winkel (born 28 April 1959) is an Austrian equestrian. She competed in two events at the 1984 Summer Olympics.
