= Jane Bartle-Wilson =

British equestrian (born 1951)

Jane Bartle-Wilson (born 14 February 1951 in Harrogate, West Riding of Yorkshire) is a former Olympian, competing in the 1984 Los Angeles games with her horse Pinocchio, in the individual dressage event. Jane is sister to Badminton winner, Christopher Bartle.

== Competitor ==
Jane competed internationally in dressage:

- Member of the British Dressage Team from 1982 to 1987
- Competed in the Los Angeles Olympics, 1984 with her horse Pinocchio
- National Dressage Champion in 1983 and 1986

== Trainer ==
Bartle-Wilson has trained many top riders including Karen Dixon who was a member of the British Olympic Three Day Event Team in Seoul, Barcelona, Atlanta and Sydney Olympics.

She was the Chef d'Equipe to the British Dressage Team 1993–2000.
