= Michel Bertraneu =

French equestrian (1949–2023)

Personal information
- National team: French team
- Citizenship: France
- Born: 26 October 1949; France
- Died: 10 December 2023 (aged 74)
- Height: 180 cm (5 ft 11 in)
- Weight: 72 kg (159 lb; 11 st 5 lb)
- Spouse: Delphine Bertraneu

Sport
- Sport: Equestrian

Michel Bertraneu (26 October 1949 – 10 December 2023) was a French equestrian.

== Biography ==
Born on 26 October 1949 in France, he competed in two events at the 1984 Summer Olympics. He also competed at the 1990 World Equestrian Games and 1983 European Dressage Championships.

Bertraneu died on 10 December 2023, at the age of 74.

== Titles ==
- 1983 - European Dressage Championships - Team Dressage: 8th
- 1990 - World FEI Equestrian Games - Team Dressage: 6th
