= Torben Ulsø Olsen =

Danish equestrian (born 1960)

Personal information
- Nationality: Danish
- Born: 27 June 1960 (age 66) Næstved, Denmark

Sport
- Sport: Equestrian
Medal record
Equestrian
Representing Denmark
European Championships
Silver medal – second place	1983 Aachen	Team dressage
Silver medal – second place	1985 Copenhagen	Team dressage

Torben Ulsø Olsen (born 27 June 1960) is a Danish equestrian. He competed in two events at the 1984 Summer Olympics.
