= Dušan Mavec =

Slovenian equestrian

Personal information
- Nationality: Slovenian
- Born: 23 October 1947 Lipica, Yugoslavia
- Died: 2 May 1995 (aged 47)

Sport
- Sport: Equestrian

Dušan Mavec (23 October 1947 – 2 May 1995) was a Slovenian equestrian. He competed in two events at the 1984 Summer Olympics.
