= Peter Ayesu =

Malawian boxer (born 1962)

Peter Ayesu (born 1 June 1962) is a former Malawian flyweight boxer. He competed at the 1984 and 1988 Summer Olympics. His best finish was 5th at the 1984 games.

== 1984 Olympic results ==
Below are the results of Peter Ayesu, a flyweight boxer from Malawi who competed at the 1984 Los Angeles Olympics:

- Round of 32: defeated Prabin Tulahar (Nepal) by decision, 5-0
- Round of 16: defeated Oppe Pinto (Paraguay) by decision, 5-0
- Quarterfinals: lost to Steve McCrory (United States) by decision, 0-5
