= Stojan Moderc =

Slovenian equestrian

Personal information
- Nationality: Slovenian
- Born: 1 April 1949 (age 75); Lipica, Yugoslavia

Sport
- Sport: Equestrian

Stojan Moderc (born 1 April 1949) is a Slovenian equestrian. He competed in two events at the 1984 Summer Olympics.
