= Alojz Lah =

Slovenian equestrian

Personal information
- Nationality: Slovenian
- Born: 17 July 1958 (age 66); Lipica, Yugoslavia

Sport
- Sport: Equestrian

Alojz Lah (born 17 July 1958) is a Slovenian equestrian. He competed in two events at the 1984 Summer Olympics.
