= Equestrian events at the 2016 Summer Olympics =

Equestrian at the Games of the XXXI Olympiad
- Pictograms for Dressage (left), Eventing (center), and Jumping (right)
- Venue: National Equestrian Center
- Dates: 6–19 August 2016
- No. of events: 6
- Competitors: 200 from 43 nations

The equestrian events at the 2016 Summer Olympics in Rio de Janeiro were held between 6 and 19 August at National Equestrian Center in Deodoro. Medals were awarded in three disciplines for both individual and team competitions.

== Events ==
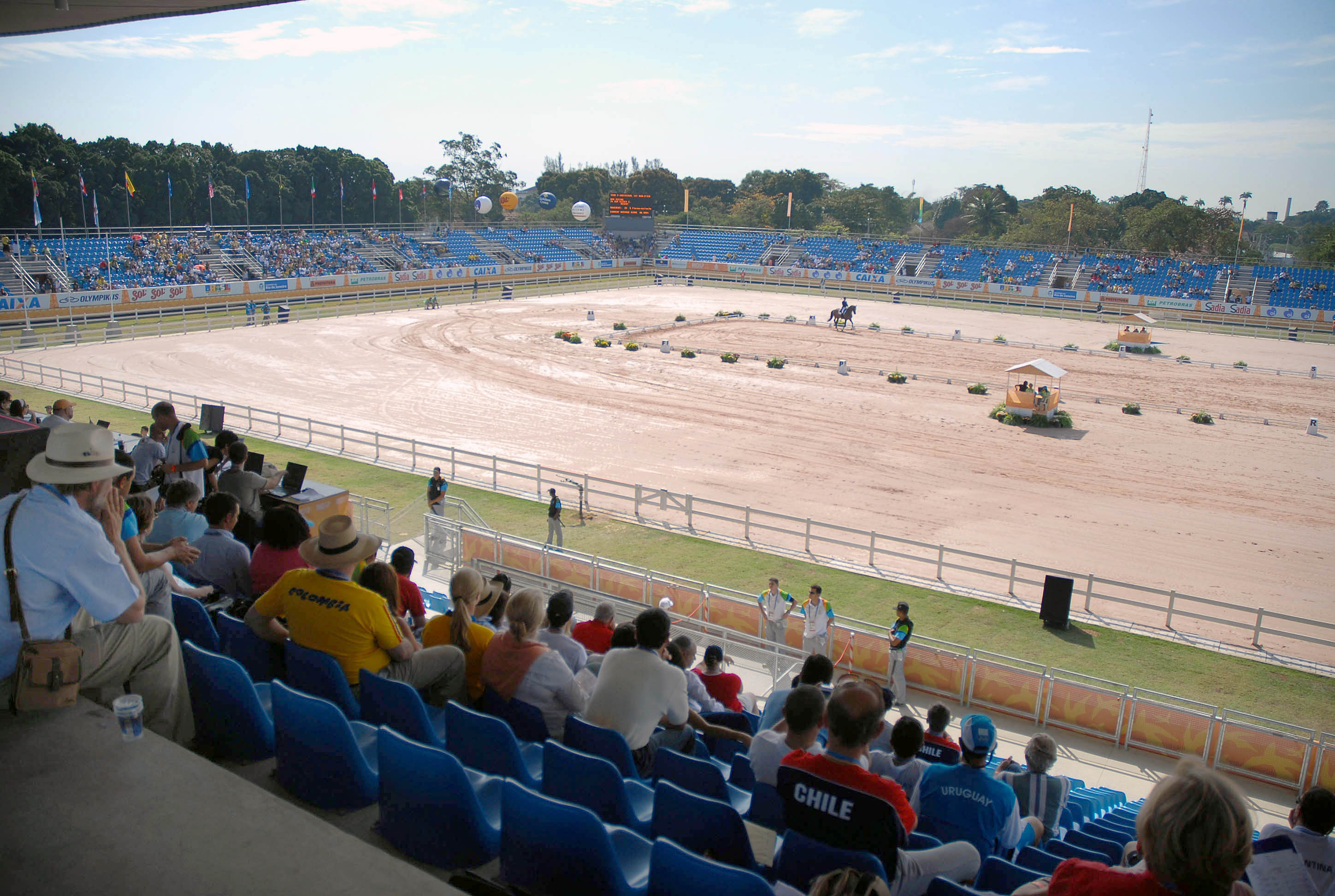
National Equestrian Center hosted the equestrian events.

Medals were awarded in the following competitions:

- Individual dressage
- Team dressage
- Individual jumping
- Team jumping
- Individual eventing
- Team eventing

== Qualification ==
Each event had its own qualification rules, but generally rely on FEI rankings.

=== Dressage ===
For the team competition, ten quota spots were available. Three team spots were awarded at the 2014 FEI World Equestrian Games. In addition, six more were awarded at regional competitions (Europe: 3, America: 1, Africa/Asia: 2). In addition, should a country had qualified 3 or 4 athletes in the individual competition, they also qualified as a team and were allowed to compete in the team competition.

For the individual competition, 60 spots were allocated as follows: 40 to the athletes who qualified from the teams above. In addition, the two highest ranked riders from each of seven geographic regions were qualified. The top six riders based on FEI ranking who did not qualify otherwise were given spots as well.

=== Jumping ===
A country might have sent up to four riders if it had qualified for the team competition. Similar to dressage, teams of four riders were qualified at either the World Equestrian Games (WEG) or through a regional competition. The WEG awarded five spots, the regions nine (Americas: two, Europe: four, Asia: two, Africa and the Middle East: one), and the hosts (Brazil). For the individual competition, a total of 75 spots was allocated as follows: 60 from the above teams the rest regional or through rankings.

=== Eventing ===
A country might have sent up to four riders if it had qualified for the team competition. Similar to dressage, teams of four riders were qualified at either the WEG, a regional competition, or through a composite spot. The WEG awarded six spots, the regions seven (America: one, Europe: two, Asia, Africa and Oceania: one), the hosts (Brazil). For the individual competition, a total of 65 spots was allocated as follows: 44 from the above teams, 7 through regional competitions and 14 through the world rankings.

== Participating ==
=== Participating nations ===
43 nations qualified. Chinese Taipei, Dominican Republic, Palestine, Qatar and Zimbabwe made their Olympic debuts in equestrian events.

- Argentina (4)
- Australia (12)
- Austria (1)
- Belgium (5)
- Brazil (8)
- Canada (10)
- Chile (1)
- China (1)
- Colombia (2)
- Denmark (4)
- Dominican Republic (1)
- Ecuador (1)
- Egypt (1)
- Finland (1)
- France (12)
- Germany (12)
- Great Britain (12)
- Ireland (6)
- Italy (5)
- Japan (10)
- Mexico (1)
- Morocco (1)
- Netherlands (12)
- New Zealand (5)
- Palestine (1)
- Peru (1)
- Poland (1)
- Portugal (1)
- Puerto Rico (1)
- Qatar (4)
- Russia (5)
- South Africa (1)
- South Korea (1)
- Spain (9)
- Sweden (12)
- Switzerland (7)
- Chinese Taipei (1)
- Turkey (1)
- Ukraine (5)
- United States (12)
- Uruguay (1)
- Venezuela (2)
- Zimbabwe (1)

== Competition format ==
=== Show jumping ===
Five rounds are ridden to determine individual medals. Riders placing first through 60th (including ties for 60th place) advance to the second round. The top 45 riders of round 2, including ties for 45th, advance to the third round. The top 35 riders of the third round progress to the 4th round, but only up to three riders per team (so if a country has four riders in the top 35, one of those is not allowed to compete for individual medals).

In the fourth round (individual final round A), the slate is wiped clean and all riders begin with zero faults. The top 20 riders in round 4 advance to round 5 (individual final round B), and ride another course. The faults for individual final round A and B and added together to determine individual medals.

The team competition completes three rounds to determine medals. It runs concurrently with the individual competition (riders running over the same course) so team riders are also competing for individual medals. The first round for team competition is the round 2 course for individual medals. The top eight teams from the first team round advance to the second team round (which is the same course as the individual round 3). The scores for these eight countries over team rounds 1 and 2 are combined, and medals are awarded based on those scores.

=== Dressage ===
Teams are made of up to four riders, all of whom are also competing concurrently for individual medals. Additionally, countries who can not make a full team may send riders to compete for individual medals.

All riders compete in the Grand Prix, which serves as the first round of both the individual and team medals. The top six teams (included those tied for 6th) advance to the Grand Prix Special, which is a slightly more rigorous test. The combined scores of the top three riders of those teams in both the Grand Prix and the Special determine the team medals, with the team with the highest score winning gold.

Riders completing the Grand Prix test (first qualifying round of the individual competition) may move on to the Grand Prix Special (second qualifying round for the individual competition) if their team is in the top six (24 riders total). Additionally, the top 8 riders who do not qualify with a team may also advance to the Special to ride for individual medals. The top 18 riders from the Special move on to the third individual round, the freestyle. However, no more than three members on a team may advance. Each rider designs their own test for the freestyle, which must be set to music and has several compulsory movements. Riders can tailor a test to their horses' strengths, as well as incorporate movements that are more difficult than those required in the Grand Prix or the Special (such as a pirouette in piaffe) in order to increase their scores. As the slate is wiped clean after the first two rounds, individual medals are assigned based on scores in the freestyle.

=== Eventing ===
Competitions for team and individual medals ran concurrently. Riders performed a dressage test, a cross-country round, and a jumping round. Team medals were then awarded by adding together the best three scores from a country's team, out of a maximum of five team members, from all three phases, the team with the lowest number of penalty points winning the gold. The top 25 individual scores after the first show jumping round performed a second, final, show jumping round to determine individual medals, with up to 3 riders in the individual running per team. Therefore, those competing for individual spots completed one dressage test and cross-country round, and two jumping rounds.

== Medal summary ==
The 2016 event was marked by returning champions in the individual events, and new nations winning the team events. 2012 Individual eventing champion Michael Jung retained his title, as did 2012 Individual dressage gold medallist, Great Britain's Charlotte Dujardin on Valegro. In jumping, veteran Nick Skelton, part of the gold medal-winning Great Britain jumping team from 2012, returned to take the individual title on Big Star, his 2012 gold winning horse.

In the team events, Germany displaced Great Britain from the top step of the Team Dressage podium, with the 2012 winners in silver, and the United States taking an unexpected bronze ahead of traditional powerhouse, the Netherlands. In Eventing and Jumping, France won the team gold medals.

As a result, Germany, Great Britain and France dominated the medal table with two golds each, Germany leading by dint of four minor medals to the one silver each for France and Great Britain.

=== Medal table ===
| Rank | Nation | Gold | Silver | Bronze | Total |
|---|---|---|---|---|---|
| 1 | Germany | 2 | 2 | 2 | 6 |
| 2 | France | 2 | 1 | 0 | 3 |
| 2 | Great Britain | 2 | 1 | 0 | 3 |
| 4 | United States | 0 | 1 | 2 | 3 |
| 5 | Sweden | 0 | 1 | 0 | 1 |
| 6 | Australia | 0 | 0 | 1 | 1 |
| 6 | Canada | 0 | 0 | 1 | 1 |
| Totals (7 entries) | | 6 | 6 | 6 | 18 |

=== Medalists ===
| Games | Gold | Silver | Bronze |
|---|---|---|---|
| Individual dressage | Charlotte Dujardin on Valegro; Great Britain | Isabell Werth on Weihegold Old; Germany | Kristina Bröring-Sprehe on Desperados FRH; Germany |
| Team dressage | Germany; Sönke Rothenberger on Cosmo; Dorothee Schneider on Showtime FRH; Kristina Bröring-Sprehe on Desperados FRH; Isabell Werth on Weihegold Old | Great Britain; Spencer Wilton on Super Nova II; Fiona Bigwood on Orthilia; Carl Hester on Nip Tuck; Charlotte Dujardin on Valegro | United States; Allison Brock on Rosevelt; Kasey Perry-Glass on Dublet; Steffen Peters on Legolas; Laura Graves on Verdades |
| Individual eventing | Michael Jung on Sam FBW; Germany | Astier Nicolas on Piaf de B'Neville; France | Phillip Dutton on Mighty Nice; United States |
| Team eventing | France; Karim Laghouag on Entebbe; Thibaut Vallette on Qing du Briot; Mathieu Lemoine on Bart L Astier Nicolas on Piaf de B'Neville | Germany; Julia Krajewski on Samourai du Thot; Sandra Auffarth on Opgun Louvo; Ingrid Klimke on Hale-Bob Old; Michael Jung on Sam FBW | Australia; Shane Rose on CP Qualified; Stuart Tinney on Pluto Mio; Sam Griffiths on Paulank Brockagh; Chris Burton on Santano II |
| Individual jumping | Nick Skelton on Big Star; Great Britain | Peder Fredricson on All In; Sweden | Eric Lamaze on Fine Lady 5 Canada |
| Team jumping | France; Philippe Rozier on Rahotep de Toscane; Kevin Staut on Rêveur de Hurtebise; Roger-Yves Bost on Sydney une Prince; Pénélope Leprevost on Flora de Mariposa | United States; Kent Farrington on Voyeur; Lucy Davis on Barron; McLain Ward on Azur; Elizabeth Madden on Cortes 'C' | Germany; Christian Ahlmann on Taloubet Z Meredith Michaels-Beerbaum on Fibonacci; Daniel Deusser on First Class; Ludger Beerbaum on Casello |

== See also ==
- Equestrian at the 2016 Summer Paralympics
