= Equestrian at the 2016 Summer Olympics – Individual dressage =

Individual dressage at the Games of the XXXI Olympiad
- Venue: National Equestrian Center
- Date: 10–15 August 2016
- Competitors: 60 from 25 nations
- Winning score: 93.857%

Medalists
1st place, gold medalist(s)		Charlotte Dujardin	Great Britain
2nd place, silver medalist(s)		Isabell Werth	Germany
3rd place, bronze medalist(s)		Kristina Bröring-Sprehe	Germany

The individual dressage in equestrian at the 2016 Summer Olympics in Rio de Janeiro was held at National Equestrian Center from 10 - 15 August.

The medals for the competition were presented by Syed Shahid Ali, Pakistan, member of the International Olympic Committee, and the gifts were presented by Maria Gretzer, FEI executive board member.

== Competition format ==
The team and individual dressage competitions used the same results. Dressage had three phases, with the last being used only for the individual event. The first phase was the Grand Prix. Individuals advanced to the second phase, the Grand Prix Special, if they were on one of the top seven teams or were one of the top 11 remaining competitors. The top 18 competitors in the Grand Prix Special (ignoring Grand Prix scores) advanced to the final phase, the Grand Prix Freestyle. The results of that phase (again ignoring previous scores) produced final results.

== Schedule ==
All times are Brasília Time (UTC–3)

Date	Time	Round
Wednesday, 10 August 2016	10:00	Grand Prix (Day 1)
Thursday, 11 August 2016	10:00	Grand Prix (Day 2)
Friday, 12 August 2016	10:00	Grand Prix Special
Monday, 15 August 2016	10:00	Grand Prix Freestyle

== Results ==
Rider	Nationality	Horse	GP score	Rank	GPS score	Rank	GPF score	Rank
Charlotte Dujardin	Great Britain	Valegro	85.071	1 Q	82.983	2 Q	93.857	1st place, gold medalist(s)
Isabell Werth	Germany	Weihegold Old	80.643	4 Q	83.711	1 Q	89.071	2nd place, silver medalist(s)
Kristina Bröring-Sprehe	Germany	Desperados FRH	82.257	2 Q	81.401	4 Q	87.142	3rd place, bronze medalist(s)
Laura Graves	United States	Verdades	78.071	5 Q	80.644	5 Q	85.196	4
Severo Jurado	Spain	Lorenzo	76.429	11 Q	77.479	6 Q	83.625	5
Dorothee Schneider	Germany	Showtime FRH	80.986	3 Q	82.619	3 Q	82.946	6
Carl Hester	Great Britain	Nip Tuck	75.529	15 Q	76.485	9 Q	82.553	7
Tinne Vilhelmson-Silfvén	Sweden	Don Aurelio	76.429	11 Q	77.199	7 Q	81.553	8
Hans Peter Minderhoud	Netherlands	Johnson	76.957	9 Q	75.224	13 Q	80.571	9
Beatriz Ferrer-Salat	Spain	Delgado	74.829	20 Q	76.863	8 Q	80.161	10
Diederik van Silfhout	Netherlands	Arlando	75.900	13 Q	76.092	11 Q	79.535	11
Steffen Peters	United States	Legolas 92	77.614	6 Q	74.622	14 Q	79.393	12
Cathrine Dufour	Denmark	Cassidy	76.657	10 Q	76.050	12 Q	78.143	13
Anna Kasprzak	Denmark	Donnperignon	73.943	23 Q	74.524	15 Q	76.982	14
Allison Brock	United States	Rosevelt	72.686	25 Q	73.824	19 Q	76.160	15
Patrik Kittel	Sweden	Deja	74.586	22 Q	73.866	18 Q	76.018	16
Fiona Bigwood	Great Britain	Orthilia	77.157	8 Q	74.342	16 Q	76.018	17
Judy Reynolds	Ireland	Vancouver K	74.700	21 Q	74.090	17 Q	75.696	18
Sönke Rothenberger	Germany	Cosmo	77.329	7 Q	76.261	10		
Edward Gal	Netherlands	Voice	75.271	16 Q	73.655	20		
Spencer Wilton	Great Britain	Super Nova II	72.686	25 Q	73.613	21		
Kasey Perry-Glass	United States	Dublet	75.229	17 Q	73.235	22		
Inessa Merkulova	Russia	Mister X	75.800	14 Q	73.154	23		
Marcela Krinke-Susmelj	Switzerland	Molberg	72.700	24 Q	72.885	24		
Karen Tebar	France	Don Luis	75.029	18 Q	72.773	25		
Agnete Kirk Thinggaard	Denmark	Jojo AZ	72.229	27 Q	72.465	26		
Belinda Trussell	Canada	Anton	72.214	28 Q	72.325	27		
Juliette Ramel	Sweden	Buriel K.H.	74.943	19 Q	72.045	28		
Mads Hendeliowitz	Sweden	Jimmie Choo SEQ	71.771	29 Q	71.681	29		
Anders Dahl	Denmark	Selten HW	69.900	37 Q	71.232	30		
Pierre Volla	France	Badinda Altena	71.500	30 Q	65.742	31		
Marina Aframeeva	Russia	Vosk	71.343	31				
Megan Lane	Canada	Caravella	71.286	32				
Victoria Max-Theurer	Austria	Della Cavalleria	71.129	33				
Daniel Martin Dockx	Spain	Grandioso	70.829	34				
Jorinde Verwimp	Belgium	Tiamo	70.771	35				
Lyndal Oatley	Australia	Sandro Boy	70.186	36				
Claudio Castilla Ruiz	Spain	Alcaide	69.814	38				
Mary Hanna	Australia	Boogie Woogie	69.643	39				
Ludovic Henry	France	After You	69.214	40				
Inna Logutenkova	Ukraine	Don Gregorius	68.943	41				
Kristy Oatley	Australia	Du Soleil	68.900	42				
Kim Dong-seon	South Korea	Bukowski	68.657	43				
Julie Brougham	New Zealand	Vom Feinsten	68.543	44				
Kiichi Harada	Japan	Egistar	68.286	45				
João Victor Marcari Oliva	Brazil	Xamã dos Pinhais	68.071	46				
Giovana Pass	Brazil	Zingaro de Lyw	67.700	47				
Yuko Kitai	Japan	Don Lorean	67.271	48				
Luiza de Almeida	Brazil	Vendaval	66.914	49				
Akane Kuroki	Japan	Toots	66.900	50				
Bernadette Pujals	Mexico	Rolex	66.757	51				
Valentina Truppa	Italy	Chablis	65.971	52				
Pedro de Almeida	Brazil	Xaparro do Vouga	65.714	53				
Sue Hearn	Australia	Remmington	65.343	54				
Stéphanie Brieussel	France	Amorak	65.114	55				
Tanya Seymour	South Africa	Ramoneur 6	63.929	56				
Christian Zimmermann	Palestine	Aramis 606	63.271	57				
Masanao Takahashi	Japan	Fabriano	62.986	58				
Yvonne Losos de Muñiz	Dominican Republic	Foco Loco W	61.300	59				
Adelinde Cornelissen	Netherlands	Parzival	RT					
