= Great Britain at the 2016 Summer Olympics =

- Flag of the United Kingdom
- IOC code: GBR
- NOC: British Olympic Association

in Rio de Janeiro 5 August 2016 – 21 August 2016
- Competitors: 366 in 25 sports
- Flag bearer (opening): Andy Murray
- Flag bearer (closing): Kate Richardson-Walsh
- Officials: Mark England (Chef de Mission)
- Medals Ranked 2nd: Gold 27 Silver 23 Bronze 17 Total 67

Summer Olympics appearances (overview)
- 1896; 1900; 1904; 1908; 1912; 1920; 1924; 1928; 1932; 1936; 1948; 1952; 1956; 1960; 1964; 1968; 1972; 1976; 1980; 1984; 1988; 1992; 1996; 2000; 2004; 2008; 2012; 2016; 2020; 2024; 2028

Other related appearances
- 1906 Intercalated Games

Great Britain, or in full Great Britain and Northern Ireland, represented by the British Olympic Association (BOA), the previous host of the 2012 Olympics at London, competed at the 2016 Summer Olympics in Rio de Janeiro, Brazil, from 5 to 21 August 2016 and the team of selected athletes was officially known as Team GB. British athletes have appeared in every Summer Olympic Games of the modern era, alongside Australia, France, Greece, and Switzerland, though Great Britain is the only country to have won at least one gold medal at all of them. The team represented the United Kingdom, the three Crown Dependencies, and the thirteen British Overseas Territories, ten of whom sent representatives.

These Games were the most successful for Great Britain since 1908, winning a total of 67 medals, which exceeded its London 2012 tally of 65 medals, therefore becoming the first nation to surpass its medal total at the Olympics immediately following one that it hosted. Great Britain also became one of only two nations (the other being Azerbaijan) ever to increase the number of medals achieved in five consecutive Games. Overall, Great Britain finished second in gold medals behind the United States and third in total medals after the United States and China. The country won gold medals in more sports than any other nation at the Games and topped the medal tables in cycling, sailing, triathlon, golf, and rowing. Great Britain also secured its first-ever golds in golf, diving, and gymnastics, and successfully defended 18 of the gold medals it had won in London.

In cycling, male, cyclist Jason Kenny won three gold medals, placing him alongside Sir Chris Hoy as the joint-most successful British Olympian. Sir Bradley Wiggins won his fifth gold and eighth overall medal, making him the most decorated British Olympian. Laura Trott won two gold medals to become Britain's most successful female Olympian with a total of four golds; dressage rider Charlotte Dujardin's gold medal had briefly placed her in first. Katherine Grainger's fifth consecutive medal, a silver, made her Britain's joint most decorated female Olympian, and made her one of only five British Olympians to win medals in five consecutive Games. Trott, Dujardin, taekwondo-ka Jade Jones and boxer Nicola Adams became the first British female Olympians ever to successfully defend individual Olympic titles.

Gymnast Max Whitlock won Britain's first ever gold medals in gymnastics, in men's floor and pommel horse, and four golds were claimed in rowing. Alistair Brownlee became the first triathlete to successfully defend an Olympic title. In athletics, in both the men's 5,000 and 10,000 metres, Mo Farah successfully defended his Olympic titles to become Britain's most successful ever athlete in the discipline. Christine Ohorougu became the second British track and field athlete to win medals in three successive Games.

In swimming, Adam Peaty won gold in the 100 metres breaststroke, the first British male swimmer to win gold since 1988. Jack Laugher and Chris Mears became Britain's first Olympic diving champions. Giles Scott won his fifth consecutive gold medal in the Finn sailing class, while Nick Dempsey became the most decorated windsurfer in Olympic history with his third medal, a silver. In the first Olympic men's golf tournament for 100 years, Justin Rose claimed the gold medal. In the women's field hockey, Great Britain won the country's first gold medal in a team sport at a Summer Olympics for 28 years.

== Medallists ==
Medal	Name	Sport	Event	Date
Gold	Adam Peaty	Swimming	Men's 100 m breaststroke	7 August
Gold	Joe Clarke	Canoeing	Men's K-1	10 August
Gold	Jack Laugher; Chris Mears	Diving	Men's 3 m synchronized springboard	10 August
Gold	Philip Hindes; Jason Kenny; Callum Skinner	Cycling	Men's team sprint	11 August
Gold	Helen Glover; Heather Stanning	Rowing	Women's coxless pair	12 August
Gold	Alex Gregory; Constantine Louloudis; George Nash; Mohamed Sbihi	Rowing	Men's coxless four	12 August
Gold	Steven Burke; Ed Clancy; Owain Doull; Bradley Wiggins	Cycling	Men's team pursuit	12 August
Gold	Paul Bennett; Scott Durant; Matt Gotrel; Matt Langridge; Tom Ransley; Pete Reed; William Satch; Andrew Triggs Hodge; Phelan Hill	Rowing	Men's eight	13 August
Gold	Katie Archibald; Elinor Barker; Joanna Rowsell; Laura Trott	Cycling	Women's team pursuit	13 August
Gold	Mo Farah	Athletics	Men's 10,000 m	13 August
Gold	Max Whitlock	Gymnastics	Men's floor	14 August
Gold	Justin Rose	Golf	Men's individual	14 August
Gold	Max Whitlock	Gymnastics	Men's pommel horse	14 August
Gold	Jason Kenny	Cycling	Men's sprint	14 August
Gold	Andy Murray	Tennis	Men's singles	14 August
Gold	Charlotte Dujardin	Equestrian	Individual dressage	15 August
Gold	Giles Scott	Sailing	Finn	16 August
Gold	Laura Trott	Cycling	Women's omnium	16 August
Gold	Jason Kenny	Cycling	Men's keirin	16 August
Gold	Alistair Brownlee	Triathlon	Men's triathlon	18 August
Gold	Saskia Clark; Hannah Mills	Sailing	Women's 470	18 August
Gold	Jade Jones	Taekwondo	Women's 57 kg	18 August
Gold	Nick Skelton	Equestrian	Individual jumping	19 August
Gold	Great Britain women's field hockey team: Maddie Hinch; Laura Unsworth; Crista Cullen; Hannah Macleod; Georgie Twigg; Helen Richardson-Walsh; Susannah Townsend; Kate Richardson-Walsh; Sam Quek; Alex Danson; Giselle Ansley; Sophie Bray; Hollie Webb; Shona McCallin; Lily Owsley; Nicola White	Field hockey	Women's tournament	19 August
Gold	Liam Heath	Canoeing	Men's K-1 200 m	20 August
Gold	Nicola Adams	Boxing	Women's flyweight	20 August
Gold	Mo Farah	Athletics	Men's 5000 m	20 August
Silver	Jazmin Carlin	Swimming	Women's 400 m freestyle	7 August
Silver	Siobhan-Marie O'Connor	Swimming	Women's 200 m individual medley	9 August
Silver	James Guy; Stephen Milne; Duncan Scott; Daniel Wallace; Robbie Renwick*	Swimming	Men's 4 × 200 m freestyle relay	9 August
Silver	Vicky Thornley; Katherine Grainger	Rowing	Women's double sculls	11 August
Silver	David Florence; Richard Hounslow	Canoeing	Men's C-2	11 August
Silver	Great Britain national rugby sevens team: Mark Robertson; Ruaridh McConnochie; Phil Burgess; Dan Norton; James Rodwell; Tom Mitchell; Dan Bibby; James Davies; Ollie Lindsay-Hague; Sam Cross; Marcus Watson; Mark Bennett	Rugby sevens	Men's tournament	11 August
Silver	Fiona Bigwood; Charlotte Dujardin; Carl Hester; Spencer Wilton	Equestrian	Team dressage	12 August
Silver	Bryony Page	Gymnastics	Women's trampoline	12 August
Silver	Jazmin Carlin	Swimming	Women's 800 m freestyle	12 August
Silver	Karen Bennett; Olivia Carnegie-Brown; Jessica Eddie; Katie Greves; Frances Houghton; Zoe Lee; Polly Swann; Melanie Wilson; Zoe De Toledo	Rowing	Women's eight	13 August
Silver	Becky James	Cycling	Women's keirin	13 August
Silver	James Guy; Adam Peaty; Duncan Scott; Chris Walker-Hebborn	Swimming	Men's 4 × 100 m medley relay	13 August
Silver	Jessica Ennis-Hill	Athletics	Women's heptathlon	13 August
Silver	Nick Dempsey	Sailing	Men's RS:X	14 August
Silver	Louis Smith	Gymnastics	Men's pommel horse	14 August
Silver	Callum Skinner	Cycling	Men's sprint	14 August
Silver	Mark Cavendish	Cycling	Men's omnium	15 August
Silver	Becky James	Cycling	Women's sprint	16 August
Silver	Jack Laugher	Diving	Men's 3 m springboard	16 August
Silver	Liam Heath; Jon Schofield	Canoeing	Men's K-2 200 m	18 August
Silver	Jonathan Brownlee	Triathlon	Men's triathlon	18 August
Silver	Lutalo Muhammad	Taekwondo	Men's 80 kg	19 August
Silver	Joseph Joyce	Boxing	Men's super heavyweight	21 August
Bronze	Edward Ling	Shooting	Men's trap	8 August
Bronze	Tom Daley; Daniel Goodfellow	Diving	Men's 10 m synchronized platform	8 August
Bronze	Chris Froome	Cycling	Men's road time trial	10 August
Bronze	Steven Scott	Shooting	Men's double trap	10 August
Bronze	Sally Conway	Judo	Women's 70 kg	10 August
Bronze	Max Whitlock	Gymnastics	Men's all-around	10 August
Bronze	Greg Rutherford	Athletics	Men's long jump	13 August
Bronze	Sophie Hitchon	Athletics	Women's hammer throw	15 August
Bronze	Amy Tinkler	Gymnastics	Women's floor	16 August
Bronze	Nile Wilson	Gymnastics	Men's horizontal bar	16 August
Bronze	Katy Marchant	Cycling	Women's sprint	16 August
Bronze	Joshua Buatsi	Boxing	Men's light heavyweight	16 August
Bronze	Marcus Ellis; Chris Langridge	Badminton	Men's doubles	18 August
Bronze	Daryll Neita; Asha Philip; Desiree Henry; Dina Asher-Smith	Athletics	Women's 4 × 100 m relay	19 August
Bronze	Vicky Holland	Triathlon	Women's triathlon	20 August
Bronze	Bianca Walkden	Taekwondo	Women's +67 kg	20 August
Bronze	Emily Diamond; Eilidh Doyle; Anyika Onuora; Kelly Massey*; Christine Ohuruogu	Athletics	Women's 4 × 400 m relay	20 August

Medals by sport
Sport	1st place, gold medalist(s)	2nd place, silver medalist(s)	3rd place, bronze medalist(s)	Total
Cycling	6	4	2	12
Rowing	3	2	0	5
Gymnastics	2	2	3	7
Canoeing	2	2	0	4
Athletics	2	1	4	7
Equestrian	2	1	0	3
Sailing	2	1	0	3
Swimming	1	5	0	6
Boxing	1	1	1	3
Diving	1	1	1	3
Taekwondo	1	1	1	3
Triathlon	1	1	1	3
Field hockey	1	0	0	1
Golf	1	0	0	1
Tennis	1	0	0	1
Rugby sevens	0	1	0	1
Shooting	0	0	2	2
Badminton	0	0	1	1
Judo	0	0	1	1
Total	27	23	17	67

Medals by date
Day	Date	1st place, gold medalist(s)	2nd place, silver medalist(s)	3rd place, bronze medalist(s)	Total
1	6 Aug	0	0	0	0
2	7 Aug	1	1	0	2
3	8 Aug	0	0	2	2
4	9 Aug	0	2	0	2
5	10 Aug	2	0	4	6
6	11 Aug	1	3	0	4
7	12 Aug	3	3	0	6
8	13 Aug	3	4	1	8
9	14 Aug	5	3	0	8
10	15 Aug	1	1	1	3
11	16 Aug	3	2	4	9
12	17 Aug	0	0	0	0
13	18 Aug	3	2	1	6
14	19 Aug	2	1	1	4
15	20 Aug	3	0	3	6
16	21 Aug	0	1	0	1
Total		27	23	17	67

* – Indicates the athlete competed in preliminaries but not the final

=== Multiple medallists ===
The following Team GB competitors won several medals at the 2016 Olympic Games.

Name	Medal	Sport	Event
Jason Kenny	Gold; Gold; Gold	Cycling	Men's team sprint Men's sprint Men's keirin
Max Whitlock	Gold; Gold; Bronze	Gymnastics	Men's floor Men's pommel horse Men's all around
Mo Farah	Gold; Gold	Athletics	Men's 10,000 metres Men's 5,000 metres
Laura Trott	Gold; Gold	Cycling	Women's team pursuit Women's omnium
Charlotte Dujardin	Gold; Silver	Equestrian	Individual dressage Team dressage
Liam Heath	Gold; Silver	Canoeing	Men's K-1 200 metres Men's K-2 200 metres
Jack Laugher	Gold; Silver	Diving	Men's synchronized 3 m springboard Men's 3 m springboard
Adam Peaty	Gold; Silver	Swimming	Men's 100 m breaststroke Men's 4 × 100 m medley relay
Callum Skinner	Gold; Silver	Cycling	Men's team sprint Men's sprint
Jazmin Carlin	Silver; Silver	Swimming	Women's 400 m freestyle Women's 800 m freestyle
James Guy	Silver; Silver	Swimming	Men's 4 × 200 m freestyle relay Men's 4 × 100 m medley relay
Becky James	Silver; Silver	Cycling	Women's keirin Women's sprint
Duncan Scott	Silver; Silver	Swimming	Men's 4 × 200 m freestyle relay Men's 4 × 100 m medley relay

== Administration ==
On 29 April 2014, the British Olympic Association announced the appointment of Mark England as Chef-de-Mission to the British Olympic team at Rio 2016.

== Medal and performance targets ==
UK Sport targeted 47 medals for Rio, the highest target ever for an away Olympics, following the success of the 2012 Games in London. The GB squad surpassed this target on 17 August

Key	✗ Target missed	✓ Target met	✓ ✓ Target exceeded

Sport	Medals target set	Medals or result	Target missed, met, or exceeded
Archery	0	0	✓
Athletics	7–9	7	✓
Badminton	0–1	1	✓
Boxing	3–5	3	✓
Canoeing	3–5	4	✓
Cycling	8–10	12	✓ ✓
Diving	1–2	3	✓ ✓
Equestrian	2–4	3	✓
Fencing	0–1	0	✓
Field hockey	1–2	1	✓
Golf	1–2	1	✓
Gymnastics	3–5	7	✓ ✓
Judo	0–1	1	✓
Modern pentathlon	1–2	0	✗
Rowing	6–8	5	✗
Rugby sevens	0–1	1	✓
Sailing	3–6	3	✓
Shooting	1–2	2	✓
Swimming	3–5	6	✓ ✓
Synchronised swimming	0	0	✓
Table tennis	0	0	✓
Taekwondo	1–3	3	✓
Tennis	1–2	1	✓
Triathlon	2–3	3	✓
Weightlifting	0	0	✓
Total	47-79	67	✓

== Funding ==
As with previous games, UK Sport was the body responsible for allocating elite funding for Olympic sports. In December 2012, a record £347 million of funding for Olympic and Paralympic athletes was announced with the aim of becoming the first nation in recent history to win more medals at the Games following being the host nation.

Four sports, basketball, synchronised swimming, water polo, and weightlifting, initially had all their funding withdrawn, while swimming and badminton had their funding cut. Following an appeal process weightlifting had its funding restored.

The Sport and Recreation Alliance, an umbrella body that represents national sports organisations in Britain, raised concerns about how the Scottish independence referendum, which took place on 18 September 2014, would affect sport funding and recognition issues for Scottish athletes who aim to compete at the Olympic Games.

== Competitors ==
Nick Skelton, the show jumper, participated at his seventh Olympic Games, a record for a British competitor. He celebrated this achievement by becoming the first British rider to win an individual gold medal in jumping.

The team included seven sets of siblings: Alistair and Jonathan Brownlee (Triathlon), Peter and Richard Chambers (Rowing), Ellie and Rebecca Downie (Gymnastics), Callum and Derek Hawkins (Athletics), Andy and Jamie Murray (Tennis), Cindy Ofili and Tiffany Porter (Athletics), and John and Michael Whitaker (Equestrian). There were also two married couples: Chris and Gabby Adcock (Badminton) and Helen and Kate Richardson-Walsh (Hockey). Mark Gleghorne (Hockey) competed for Great Britain while his brother Paul competed for Ireland in the same sport.

The following is a list of the number of competitors participating in the Games. Note that reserves in fencing, field hockey, football, and handball are not counted as athletes:

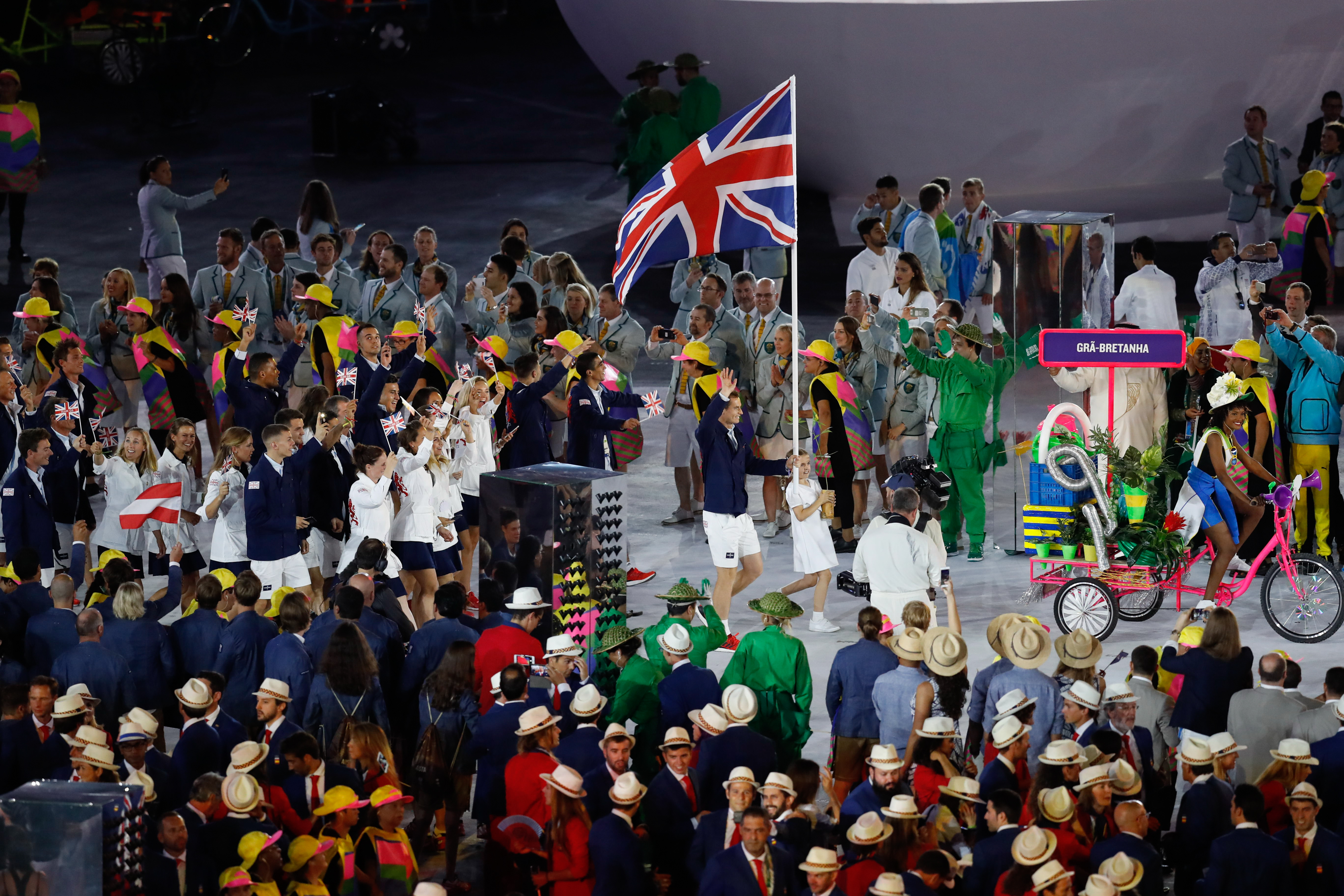
The Great Britain team at the opening ceremony; tennis player Andy Murray is the flag bearer.

Sport	Men	Women	Total
Archery	1	1	2
Athletics	41	39	80
Badminton	4	4	8
Boxing	10	2	12
Canoeing	5	7	12
Cycling	16	10	26
Diving	5	6	11
Equestrian	7	5	12
Fencing	3	0	3
Field hockey	16	16	32
Golf	2	2	4
Gymnastics	6	7	13
Judo	3	4	7
Modern pentathlon	2	2	4
Rowing	28	15	43
Rugby sevens	12	12	24
Sailing	8	7	15
Shooting	3	3	6
Swimming	16	12	28
Synchronized swimming	—	2	2
Table tennis	3	0	3
Taekwondo	2	2	4
Tennis	5	2	7
Triathlon	3	3	6
Weightlifting	1	1	2
Total	202	164	366

== Archery ==
One British archer qualified for the men's individual recurve at the Olympics by securing one of three available Olympic spots at the 2016 European Championships in Nottingham. Meanwhile, another British archer was added to the squad by virtue of a top six national finish in the women's individual recurve at the 2016 Archery World Cup meet in Antalya, Turkey.

Athlete	Event	Ranking round		Round of 64	Round of 32	Round of 16	Quarterfinals	Semifinals	Final / BM	
Athlete	Event	Score	Seed	Opposition Score	Opposition Score	Opposition Score	Opposition Score	Opposition Score	Opposition Score	Rank
Patrick Huston	Men's individual	656	38	van der Ven (NED); W 6–4	Ku B-c (KOR); L 0–6	did not advance				
Naomi Folkard	Women's individual	639	23	Rochmawati (INA); W 6–5	Kawanaka (JPN); W 6–0	dos Santos (BRA); W 6–2	Chang H-j (KOR); L 1–7	did not advance		

== Athletics ==
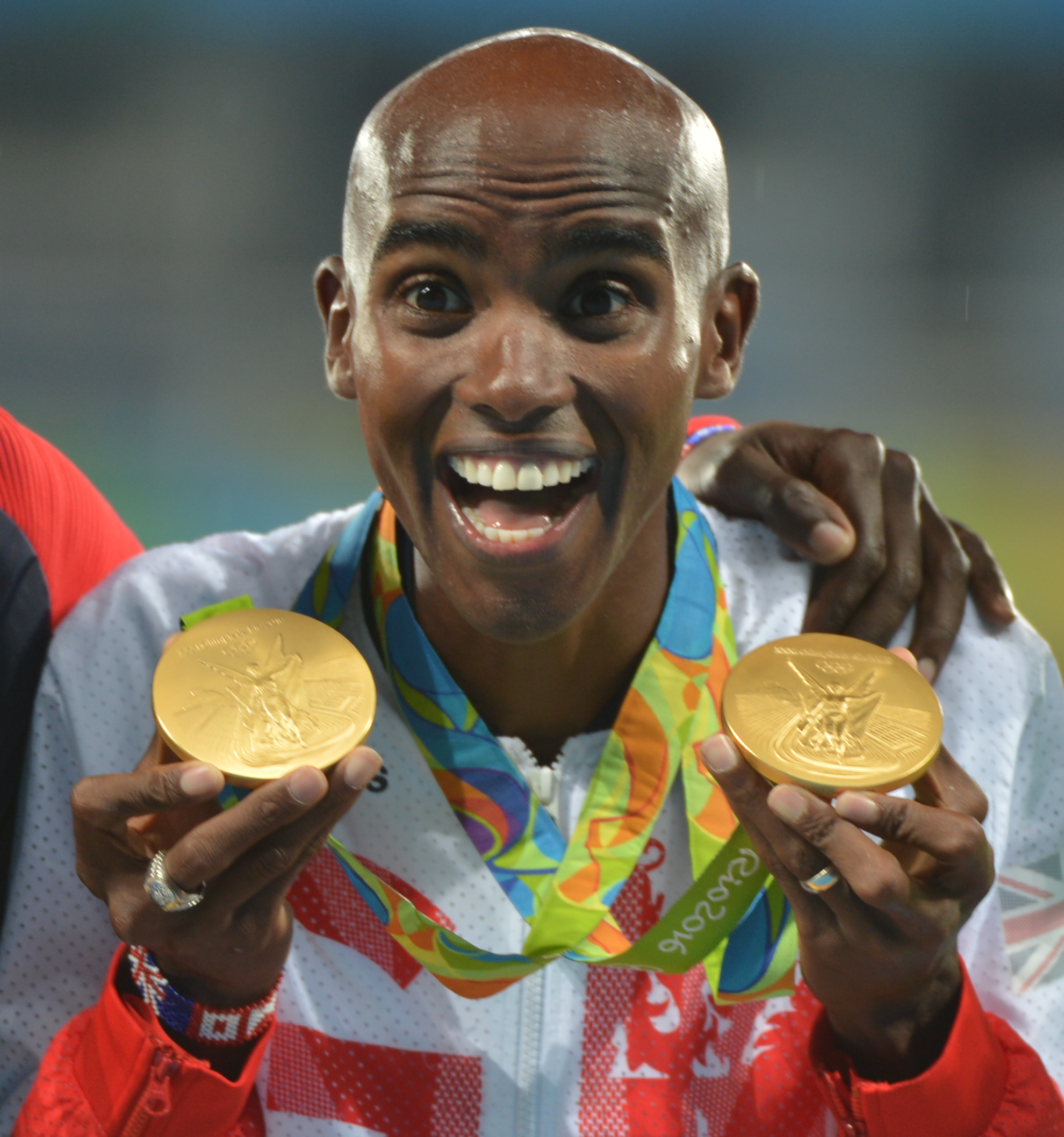
Mo Farah successfully defended both gold medals

Great Britain secured a place in all relay events with the exception of the men's 4 × 100 m relay based on the team's performance at the 2015 IAAF World Relays, before securing a place in the final relay in July 2016 by their position in world rankings. British athletes have so far achieved qualifying standards in the following athletics events (up to a maximum of 3 athletes in each event): The team nominated its athletes with an entry standard for the individual events based on the results at the British Championships, scheduled to take place in Birmingham between 24 and 26 June 2016.

On 24 April 2016, the top two finishers in both the men's and women's 2016 London Marathon won automatic places for Team GB at the Olympics. Two days later, British Athletics confirmed four athletes, and added Derek Hawkins, brother of Callum to the men's marathon, and race walker Dominic King to the 50 km (31 mi) walk.

On 21 May 2016, the Great Britain trials were held for the 10,000 metres, with two places in both the men's and women's races available to the first two across the line, if they had the qualification time. In the women's race, Jess Andrews won in the qualification time, while Beth Potter, who already had the time, came second and also earned a place in Rio. Mo Farah, reigning World and Olympic champion at 5000 and 10,000 metres, has been preselected by Great Britain for both men's races. Neither of the first two finishers in the men's race had at that point achieved the qualifying standard, but on 11 June 2016, Ross Millington, who won the trial, managed to also beat the standard, thus confirming his Olympic place.

On 29 May 2016, Katarina Johnson-Thompson achieved the qualification mark in heptathlon at the Gotzis meeting, the designated Olympic trial for Great Britain, joining the pre-selected Jessica Ennis-Hill in that event.

Following the end of the qualifying period on 11 July, a total of 80 athletes (41 men and 39 women) were officially named to Team GB's track and field team for the Games. Apart from Ennis-Hill and Farah, notable athletes also featured defending Olympic long jump champion Greg Rutherford, two-time medalist Christine Ohuruogu, high jump bronze medalist Robbie Grabarz, Sudanese-born sprinter Rabah Yousif, and long-distance stalwart Jo Pavey, who is set to compete at her fifth Games in the 10,000 metres.

Key

- Note–Ranks given for track events are within the athlete's heat only
- Q = Qualified for the next round
- q = Qualified for the next round as a fastest loser or, in field events, by position without achieving the qualifying target
- NR = National record
- N/A = Round not applicable for the event
- Bye = Athlete not required to compete in round

Track & road events
Men

Athlete	Event	Heat		Quarterfinal		Semifinal		Final	
Athlete	Event	Result	Rank	Result	Rank	Result	Rank	Result	Rank
James Dasaolu	100 m	Bye		10.18	3 q	10.16	6	Did not advance	
James Ellington	100 m	Bye		10.29	5	Did not advance			
Chijindu Ujah	100 m	Bye		10.13	2 Q	10.01 SB	4	Did not advance	
Adam Gemili	200 m	20.20	2 Q	—N/a		20.08	3 q	20.12	4
Nethaneel Mitchell-Blake	200 m	20.24	2 Q	—N/a		20.25	5	Did not advance	
Danny Talbot	200 m	20.27 PB	2 Q	—N/a		20.25 PB	3	Did not advance	
Matthew Hudson-Smith	400 m	45.26	3 Q	—N/a		44.48 PB	2 Q	44.61	8
Martyn Rooney	400 m	45.60	5	—N/a		Did not advance			
Rabah Yousif	400 m	DNS		—N/a		Did not advance			
Elliot Giles	800 m	1:47.88	7	—N/a		Did not advance			
Michael Rimmer	800 m	1:45.99	3 Q	—N/a		1:46.80	8	did not advance	
Charlie Grice	1500 m	3:38.41	10 q**	—N/a		3:40.050	5 Q	3:51.73	12
Chris O'Hare	1500 m	3:39.36	4 Q	—N/a		3:40.93	10	Did not advance	
Andrew Butchart	5000 m	13:20.08	5 Q	—N/a				13:08.61 PB	6
Mo Farah	5000 m	13:25.25	3 Q	—N/a				13:03.30	1st place, gold medalist(s)
Tom Farrell	5000 m	14:11.65	20	—N/a				Did not advance	
Mo Farah	10000 m	—N/a						27:05.17	1st place, gold medalist(s)
Ross Millington	10000 m	—N/a						29:14.95	31
Andy Vernon	10000 m	—N/a						28:19.36 SB	25
Laurence Clarke	110 m hurdles	13:55	3 Q	—N/a		13.47	5	Did not advance	
Andrew Pozzi	110 m hurdles	13:50	2 Q	—N/a		13.67	5	Did not advance	
Jack Green	400 m hurdles	48.96	2 Q	—N/a		49.54	8	Did not advance	
Sebastian Rodger	400 m hurdles	49.54	6 *	—N/a		Did not advance			
Rob Mullett	3000 m steeplechase	8:48.19	12	—N/a				Did not advance	
James Ellington; Chijindu Ujah***; Adam Gemili; Richard Kilty; Harry Aikines-Aryeetey	4 × 100 m relay	38.06	4 q	—N/a				37.98	5
Nigel Levine; Matthew Hudson-Smith; Delano Williams; Martyn Rooney; Jack Green; Jarryd Dunn; Rabah Yousif	4 × 400 m relay	DSQ		—N/a				Did not advance	
Callum Hawkins	Marathon	—N/a						2:11:52	9
Derek Hawkins	Marathon	—N/a						2:29:24	114
Tsegai Tewelde	Marathon	—N/a						DNF	
Tom Bosworth	20 km walk	—N/a						1:20:13 NR	6
Dominic King	50 km walk	—N/a						DSQ	

* : Seb Rodger originally advanced as the last of the 'fastest losers' to the semifinal, but was excluded after a successful appeal by another runner against disqualification.
** : Charlie Grice was reinstated for the semi-finals following an appeal after obstruction in the heat.
*** : Chijindu Ujah raced in heat but not in final.

Women

Athlete	Event	Heat		Quarterfinal		Semifinal		Final	
Athlete	Event	Result	Rank	Result	Rank	Result	Rank	Result	Rank
Desirèe Henry	100 m	Bye		11.08	1 Q	11.09	4	Did not advance	
Daryll Neita	100 m	Bye		11.41	4	Did not advance			
Asha Philip	100 m	Bye		11.34	3 q	11.33	8	Did not advance	
Dina Asher-Smith	200 m	22.77	2 Q	—N/a		22.49	4 q	22.31 SB	5
Jodie Williams	200 m	22.69	3 q	—N/a		22.99	8	Did not advance	
Seren Bundy-Davies	400 m	53.63	7	—N/a		Did not advance			
Emily Diamond	400 m	51.76	4 q	—N/a		51.49	6	Did not advance	
Christine Ohuruogu	400 m	51.40	2 Q	—N/a		51.22	5	Did not advance	
Shelayna Oskan-Clarke	800 m	1:56.67	3 q	—N/a		1:59.45 SB	5	Did not advance	
Lynsey Sharp	800 m	2:00.83	1 Q	—N/a		1:58.65	2 Q	1:57.69 PB	6
Laura Muir	1500 m	4:06.53	3 Q	—N/a		4:04.16	3 Q	4:12.88	7
Laura Weightman	1500 m	4:08.37	7 q	—N/a		4:05.28	5 Q	4:14.95	11
Eilish McColgan	5000 m	15:18.20	5 Q	—N/a				15:12.09	13
Stephanie Twell	5000 m	15:25.90	8	—N/a				Did not advance	
Laura Whittle	5000 m	15:31.30	10	—N/a				Did not advance	
Jess Andrews	10000 m	—N/a						31:35.92 PB	16
Jo Pavey	10000 m	—N/a						31:33.44 SB	15
Beth Potter	10000 m	—N/a						33:04.34	34
Cindy Ofili	100 m hurdles	12.75	1 Q	—N/a		12.71	2 Q	12.63 SB	4
Tiffany Porter	100 m hurdles	12.87	2 Q	—N/a		12.82	4 q	12.76	=6
Eilidh Doyle	400 m hurdles	55:46	1 Q	—N/a		54.99	3 q	54.61	8
Lennie Waite	3000 m steeplechase	10:14.18	17	—N/a				Did not advance	
Daryll Neita; Asha Philip; Desirèe Henry; Dina Asher-Smith	4 × 100 m relay	41.93	2 Q	—N/a				41.77 NR	3rd place, bronze medalist(s)
Emily Diamond; Eilidh Doyle; Anyika Onuora; Christine Ohuruogu; Kelly Massey*	4 × 400 m relay	3:24.81 SB	2 Q	—N/a				3:25.88	3rd place, bronze medalist(s)
Alyson Dixon	Marathon	—N/a						2:34:11	28
Sonia Samuels	Marathon	—N/a						2:34:36	30

* : Kelly Massey raced in heat but not in final.

Field events
Men

Athlete	Event	Qualification		Final	
Athlete	Event	Distance	Position	Distance	Position
Greg Rutherford	Long jump	7.90	10 q	8.29	3rd place, bronze medalist(s)
Chris Baker	High jump	2.26	16	Did not advance	
Robbie Grabarz	High jump	2.29	5 q	2.33 SB	=4
Luke Cutts	Pole vault	5.45	22	Did not advance	
Chris Bennett	Hammer throw	71.32	19	Did not advance	
Mark Dry	Hammer throw	71.03	21	Did not advance	
Nick Miller	Hammer throw	70.83	22	Did not advance	

Women

Athlete	Event	Qualification		Final	
Athlete	Event	Distance	Position	Distance	Position
Shara Proctor	Long jump	6.36	21	Did not advance	
Jazmin Sawyers	Long jump	6.53	12 q	6.69	8
Lorraine Ugen	Long jump	6.65	7 q	6.58	11
Morgan Lake	High jump	1.94	=15 Q PB	1.93	=10
Holly Bradshaw	Pole vault	4.60	=2 Q	4.70 SB	5
Jade Lally	Discus throw	54.06	28	Did not advance	
Sophie Hitchon	Hammer throw	70.37	11 q	74.54 NR	3rd place, bronze medalist(s)

Combined events – Women's heptathlon

Athlete	Event	100H	HJ	SP	200 m	LJ	JT	800 m	Final	Rank
Jessica Ennis-Hill	Result	12.84	1.89	13.86	23.49	6.34	46.06	2:09.07	6775 SB	2nd place, silver medalist(s)
Jessica Ennis-Hill	Points	1149	1093	785	1030	956	784	978	6775 SB	2nd place, silver medalist(s)
Katarina Johnson-Thompson	Result	13.48	1.98 NR	11.68	23.26	6.51	36.36	2:10.47	6523 SB	6
Katarina Johnson-Thompson	Points	1053	1211	640	1053	1010	598	958	6523 SB	6

== Badminton ==
Great Britain qualified a total of eight badminton players for each of the following events into the Olympic tournament based on the BWF World Rankings as of 5 May 2016: one entry each in the men's and women's singles, and a pair in the men's, women's, and mixed doubles.

Athlete	Event	Group Stage				Elimination	Quarterfinal	Semifinal	Final / BM	
Athlete	Event	Opposition Score	Opposition Score	Opposition Score	Rank	Opposition Score	Opposition Score	Opposition Score	Opposition Score	Rank
Rajiv Ouseph	Men's singles	Sasaki (JPN); W (21–15, 21–9)	Koukal (CZE); W (21–14, 21–8)	—N/a	1 Q	Sugiarto (INA); W (21–13, 14–21, 21–16)	Axelsen (DEN); L (12–21, 16–21)	Did not advance		
Marcus Ellis; Chris Langridge	Men's doubles	Kim G-j / Kim S-r (KOR); W (17–21, 25–23, 21–18)	Boe / Mogensen (DEN); L (9–21, 21–9, 16–21)	Cwalina / Wacha (POL); W (21–18, 21–16)	2 Q	—N/a	Endo / Hayakawa (JPN); W (21–19, 21–17)	Fu Hf / Zhang N (CHN); L (14–21, 18–21)	Chai B / Hong W (CHN); W (21–18, 19–21, 21–10)	3rd place, bronze medalist(s)
Kirsty Gilmour	Women's singles	Zetchiri (BUL); L (21–12, 17–21, 16–21)	Jaquet (SUI); W (21–17, 21–15)	—N/a	2	did not advance				
Heather Olver; Lauren Smith	Women's doubles	Maheswari / Polii (INA); L (10–21, 13–21)	Poon L Y / Tse Y S (HKG); W (21–17, 18–21, 21–16)	V Hoo / Woon K W (MAS); L (17–21, 22–24)	3	—N/a	Did not advance			
Chris Adcock; Gabby Adcock	Mixed doubles	Fischer Nielsen / Pedersen (DEN); W (21–19, 22–24, 21–17)	Xu C / Ma J (CHN); L (21–13, 20–22, 15–21)	Mateusiak / Zięba (POL); L (21–18, 25–27, 9–21)	3	—N/a	Did not advance			

== Boxing ==
Great Britain entered twelve boxers to compete in each of the following weight classes into the Olympic boxing tournament. Galal Yafai, Muhammad Ali, Qais Ashfaq, Joseph Cordina, Antony Fowler, Joshua Buatsi, Lawrence Okolie, and Joseph Joyce claimed their Olympic spots at the 2016 European Qualification Tournament in Samsun, Turkey.

London 2012 flyweight champion Nicola Adams and fellow Olympian Savannah Marshall were the only British women to book Olympic spots, as a result of their quarterfinal victories at the World Championships in Astana, Kazakhstan. Pat McCormack and Josh Kelly secured further Olympic places for Team GB at the 2016 AIBA World Qualifying Tournament in Baku, Azerbaijan.

Men

Athlete	Event	Round of 32	Round of 16	Quarterfinals	Semifinals	Final	
Athlete	Event	Opposition Result	Opposition Result	Opposition Result	Opposition Result	Opposition Result	Rank
Galal Yafai	Light flyweight	Fotsala (CMR); W 3–0	Argilagos (CUB); L 1–2	Did not advance			
Muhammad Ali	Flyweight	Bye	Finol (VEN); L 0–3	Did not advance			
Qais Ashfaq	Bantamweight	Butdee (THA); L 0–3	Did not advance				
Joe Cordina	Lightweight	Suarez (PHI); W 2–1	Tojibaev (UZB); L 0–2	Did not advance			
Pat McCormack	Light welterweight	Zhussupov (KAZ); W 2–1	Toledo (CUB); L 1–2	Did not advance			
Josh Kelly	Welterweight	Mohamed (EGY); W 3–0	Yeleussinov (KAZ); L 0–3	Did not advance			
Antony Fowler	Middleweight	Alimkhanuly (KAZ); L 0–3	Did not advance				
Joshua Buatsi	Light heavyweight	Katende (UGA); W TKO	Rasulov (UZB); W KO	Benchabla (ALG); W 3–0	Niyazymbetov (KAZ); L 0–3	Did not advance	3rd place, bronze medalist(s)
Lawrence Okolie	Heavyweight	Jakubowski (POL); W 3–0	Savón (CUB); L 0–3	Did not advance			
Joseph Joyce	Super heavyweight	Bye	Morais (CPV); W TKO	Jalolov (UZB); W 3–0	Dychko (KAZ); W 3–0	Yoka (FRA); L 1–2	2nd place, silver medalist(s)

Women

Athlete	Event	Round of 16	Quarterfinals	Semifinals	Final	
Athlete	Event	Opposition Result	Opposition Result	Opposition Result	Opposition Result	Rank
Nicola Adams	Flyweight	Bye	Kob (UKR); W 3–0	Ren Cc (CHN); W 3–0	Ourahmoune (FRA); W 3–0	1st place, gold medalist(s)
Savannah Marshall	Middleweight	Nash (SWE); W 3–0	Fontijn (NED); L 0–2	Did not advance		

== Canoeing ==
=== Slalom ===
British canoeists qualified a maximum of one boat in each of the following classes through the 2015 ICF Canoe Slalom World Championships and the Olympic selection trials, both held in Lee Valley Park. On 4 November 2015, Team GB announced the names of the four slalom canoeists selected for the Games.

Athlete	Event	Preliminary						Semifinal		Final	
Athlete	Event	Run 1	Rank	Run 2	Rank	Best	Rank	Time	Rank	Time	Rank
David Florence	Men's C-1	94.11	1	DNS		94.11	3 Q	99.36	7 Q	109.00	10
David Florence; Richard Hounslow	Men's C-2	103.27	2	DNS		103.27	3 Q	109.60	3 Q	102.01	2nd place, silver medalist(s)
Joe Clarke	Men's K-1	135.89	13	86.95	1	86.95	2 Q	90.67	3 Q	88.53	1st place, gold medalist(s)
Fiona Pennie	Women's K-1	100.52	1	DNS		100.52	3 Q	101.81	2 Q	105.70	6

=== Sprint ===
British canoeists qualified one boat in each of the following events through the 2015 ICF Canoe Sprint World Championships and the Olympic selection trials, held in Duisburg (18 to 19 April 2016). Under Olympic rules, the successful canoeists could also enter other events where no Team GB canoeist was separately entered. As a result, Liam Heath, a World Cup gold medalist in the K-1 200 m, would take part in that event, and this was confirmed on 14 June 2016, as well as the participation of Jessica Walker in the equivalent women's event under the same rule. On 18 July 2016, as a consequence of the disqualification of the Romanian and Belarusian squads from the Games, Lani Belcher and Angela Hannah, as highest ranked non-qualifier in the 2015 World Championships, were upgraded to a quota place in the K2-500 event.

Men

Athlete	Event	Heats		Semifinals		Final	
Athlete	Event	Time	Rank	Time	Rank	Time	Rank
Liam Heath	K-1 200 m	34.327	1 Q	34.076	1 FA	35.197	1st place, gold medalist(s)
Liam Heath; Jon Schofield	K-2 200 m	31.534	3 Q	31.899	1 FA	32.368	2nd place, silver medalist(s)

Women

Athlete	Event	Heats		Semifinals		Final	
Athlete	Event	Time	Rank	Time	Rank	Time	Rank
Rachel Cawthorn	K-1 500 m	1:56.612	4 Q	1:58.410	6 FB	1:58.470	15
Jessica Walker	K-1 200 m	41.123	5 Q	41.483	4 FB	42.205	15
Lani Belcher; Angela Hannah	K-2 500 m	1:53.948	8 Q	1:49.285	7 FB	1:54.193	15
Rachel Cawthorn; Louisa Gurski; Rebeka Simon; Jessica Walker	K-4 500 m	1:36.853	5 Q	1:36.254	=2 FA	1:40.043	7

Qualification Legend: FA = Qualify to final (medal); FB = Qualify to final B (non-medal)

== Cycling ==
=== Road ===
British riders qualified for the following quota places in the men's and women's Olympic road race by virtue of their top 15 final national ranking in the 2015 UCI World Tour (for men) and top 22 in the UCI World Ranking (for women).

The BOA announced the eight-athlete squad of road racers (five men and three women) for Team GB on 24 June 2016. On 19 July, it was announced that Peter Kennaugh had withdrawn from the squad due to a lack of race fitness after struggling to recover from injuries sustained in May and that his place in the squad would be taken by Steve Cummings.

Men

Athlete	Event	Time	Rank
Steve Cummings	Road race	Did not finish	
Chris Froome	Road race	6:13:03	12
Chris Froome	Time trial	1:13:17.54	3rd place, bronze medalist(s)
Ian Stannard	Road race	Did not finish	
Geraint Thomas	Road race	6:12:34	11
Geraint Thomas	Time trial	1:14:52.85	9
Adam Yates	Road race	6:13:08	15

Women

Athlete	Event	Time	Rank
Lizzie Armitstead	Road race	3:51:47	5
Nikki Harris	Road race	Did not finish	
Emma Pooley	Road race	Did not finish	
Emma Pooley	Time trial	46:31.98	14

=== Track ===
Following the completion of the 2016 UCI Track Cycling World Championships, British riders accumulated spots in both men's and women's team pursuit, and men's team sprint, as well as both the men's and women's omnium. As a result of their place in the men's team sprint, Great Britain won the right to enter two riders in both men's sprint and men's keirin.

Great Britain narrowly failed to win a quota place in the women's team sprint. As such, they did not earn the two places in women's sprint and keirin that the team quota place would have gained them. However, Great Britain did earn a single place in the women's keirin, and two places in the women's sprint, by virtue of their final individual UCI Olympic rankings in those events.

Team GB's track cycling squad was officially selected for the Games on 24 June 2016, with seven-time medallist Bradley Wiggins returning to the track scene at his fifth straight Olympics.

Sprint

Athlete	Event	Qualification		Round 1	Repechage 1	Round 2	Repechage 2	Quarterfinals	Semifinals	Final	
Athlete	Event	Time Speed (km/h)	Rank	Opposition Time Speed (km/h)	Opposition Time Speed (km/h)	Opposition Time Speed (km/h)	Opposition Time Speed (km/h)	Opposition Time Speed (km/h)	Opposition Time Speed (km/h)	Opposition Time Speed (km/h)	Rank
Jason Kenny	Men's sprint	9.551 OR; 75.384	1 Q	Levy (GER); W 10.245; 70.278	Bye	Puerta (COL); W 10.369; 69.437	Bye	Constable (AUS); W 10.341, W 10.219	Dmitriev (RUS); L, W 10.048, W 10.071	Skinner (GBR); W 10.164, W 9.916	1st place, gold medalist(s)
Callum Skinner	Men's sprint	9.703 OR; 74.203	2 Q	Constable (AUS); W 10.254; 70.216	Bye	Constable (AUS); W 10.359; 69.504	Bye	Xu C (CHN); W 10.299, W 10.212	Glaetzer (AUS); W 10.119, W 10.244	Kenny (GBR); L, L	2nd place, silver medalist(s)
Becky James	Women's sprint	10.721 OR; 67.157	1 Q	Ismayilova (AZE); W 11.377; 63.285	Bye	Cueff (FRA); W 11.375; 63.296	Bye	Zhong Ts (CHN); W 11.289, W 11.243	Ligtlee (NED); W 11.246, W 10.970	Vogel (GER); L, L	2nd place, silver medalist(s)
Katy Marchant	Women's sprint	10.787; 66.747	2 Q	Sullivan (CAN); W 11.499; 62.614	Bye	Welte (GER); W 12.247; 58.789	Bye	Krupeckaitė (LTU); W 11.225, W 11.342	Vogel (GER); L, L	Ligtlee (NED); W 11.237, W 11.424	3rd place, bronze medalist(s)

Team sprint

Athlete	Event	Qualification		Semifinals		Final	
Athlete	Event	Time Speed (km/h)	Rank	Opposition Time Speed (km/h)	Rank	Opposition Time Speed (km/h)	Rank
Philip Hindes; Jason Kenny; Callum Skinner	Men's team sprint	42.562 OR; 63.436	1 Q	Venezuela; W 42.640; 63.320	2 FA	New Zealand; W 42.440 OR; 63.619	1st place, gold medalist(s)

Qualification legend: FA=Gold medal final; FB=Bronze medal final

Pursuit

Athlete	Event	Qualification		Semifinals		Final	
Athlete	Event	Time	Rank	Opponent Results	Rank	Opponent Results	Rank
Steven Burke; Ed Clancy; Owain Doull; Bradley Wiggins	Men's team pursuit	3:51.943	1 Q	New Zealand; W 3:50.570 WR	1	Australia; W 3:50.265 WR	1st place, gold medalist(s)
Katie Archibald; Elinor Barker; Joanna Rowsell; Laura Trott	Women's team pursuit	4:13.260 WR	1 Q	Canada; W 4:12.152 WR	1	United States; W 4:10.236 WR	1st place, gold medalist(s)

Keirin

Athlete	Event	1st Round	Repechage	2nd Round	Final
Athlete	Event	Rank	Rank	Rank	Rank
Jason Kenny	Men's keirin	1 Q	Bye	1 Q	1st place, gold medalist(s)
Callum Skinner	Men's keirin	6	REL	Did not advance	
Becky James	Women's keirin	1 Q	Bye	2 Q	2nd place, silver medalist(s)

Omnium

Athlete	Event	Scratch race		Individual pursuit			Elimination race		Time trial			Flying lap			Points race		Total points	Rank
Athlete	Event	Rank	Points	Time	Rank	Points	Rank	Points	Time	Rank	Points	Time	Rank	Points	Points	Rank	Total points	Rank
Mark Cavendish	Men's omnium	6	30	4:16.878	2	38	7	28	1:02.868	6	30	12.793	3	36	32	4	194	2nd place, silver medalist(s)
Laura Trott	Women's omnium	2	38	3:25.054 NR	1	40	1	40	35.253	2	38	13.708	1	40	34	7	230	1st place, gold medalist(s)

=== Mountain biking ===
Great Britain received a spare Olympic berth freed up by Sweden from the UCI to send a mountain biker competing in the Olympic men's cross-country race. On 4 July 2016, British Cycling announced that Grant Ferguson was officially added to the cycling squad for the Games.

Athlete	Event	Time	Rank
Grant Ferguson	Men's cross-country	1:39.10	17

=== BMX ===
British riders qualified for two men's quota places in BMX at the Olympics, as a result of the nation's fifth-place finish in the UCI Olympic Ranking List of 31 May 2016. Team GB selected London 2012 top 8 finalist Liam Phillips and rookie Kyle Evans to the BMX cycling team for the Games on 24 June 2016.

Athlete	Event	Seeding		Quarterfinal		Semifinal		Final	
Athlete	Event	Result	Rank	Points	Rank	Points	Rank	Result	Rank
Kyle Evans	Men's BMX	35.776	21	19	7	Did not advance			
Liam Phillips	Men's BMX	35.095	10	28	8	Did not advance			

== Diving ==
British divers qualified for seven of the maximum of eight individual spots and four synchronized teams at the Olympics through the 2015 FINA World Championships and the 2016 FINA World Cup series. The divers who secured the places for Great Britain were not necessarily the athletes who would be selected to represent their country in these events. Instead, they needed to compete at the Olympic trials, held from 10 to 12 June 2016 in Sheffield, to book their places for the Games. A total of eleven divers (five men and six women) were officially named to Team GB on 17 June 2016, featuring London 2012 bronze medalist Tom Daley in both men's individual and synchronized platform.

Men

Athlete	Event	Preliminaries		Semifinals		Final	
Athlete	Event	Points	Rank	Points	Rank	Points	Rank
Jack Laugher	3 m springboard	439.95	7 Q	389.40	12 Q	523.85	2nd place, silver medalist(s)
Freddie Woodward	3 m springboard	388.15	19	Did not advance			
Tom Daley	10 m platform	571.85	1 Q	403.25	18	Did not advance	
Jack Laugher; Chris Mears	3 m synchronised springboard	—N/a				454.32	1st place, gold medalist(s)
Tom Daley; Daniel Goodfellow	10 m synchronised platform	—N/a				444.45	3rd place, bronze medalist(s)

Women

Athlete	Event	Preliminaries		Semifinals		Final	
Athlete	Event	Points	Rank	Points	Rank	Points	Rank
Rebecca Gallantree	3 m springboard	286.65	20	Did not advance			
Grace Reid	3 m springboard	304.95	14 Q	314.25	11 Q	318.60	8
Sarah Barrow	10 m platform	277.40	23	Did not advance			
Tonia Couch	10 m platform	332.80	5 Q	318.00	10 Q	323.70	12
Alicia Blagg; Rebecca Gallantree	3 m synchronized springboard	—N/a				292.83	6
Tonia Couch; Lois Toulson	10 m synchronized platform	—N/a				319.44	5

== Equestrian ==
Great Britain became one of the first three nations to earn places at the Games, qualifying a complete team in dressage by winning the silver medal in the team event at the 2014 FEI World Equestrian Games. The Great Britain eventing team also qualified by winning a silver medal at the same event. Great Britain secured a full equestrian team for Rio when the British riders achieved one of three qualification places from the 2015 European Show Jumping Championships.

=== Dressage ===
Athlete	Horse	Event	Grand Prix		Grand Prix Special		Grand Prix Freestyle		Overall	
Athlete	Horse	Event	Score	Rank	Score	Rank	Technical	Artistic	Score	Rank
Fiona Bigwood	Orthilia	Individual	77.157	8 Q	74.384	16 Q	74.179	77.857	76.018	17
Charlotte Dujardin	Valegro	Individual	85.071	1 Q	83.025	2 Q	90.000	97.714	93.857	1st place, gold medalist(s)
Carl Hester	Nip Tuck	Individual	75.529	15 Q	76.485	9 Q	79.107	86.000	82.553	7
Spencer Wilton	Super Nova	Individual	72.686	25 Q	73.739	21	Did not advance			
Fiona Bigwood; Charlotte Dujardin; Carl Hester; Spencer Wilton	See above	Team	79.252	2 Q	77.951	2	—N/a		78.602	2nd place, silver medalist(s)

=== Eventing ===
Athlete	Horse	Event	Dressage		Cross-country			Jumping						Total	
Athlete	Horse	Event	Dressage		Cross-country			Qualifier			Final			Total	
Athlete	Horse	Event	Penalties	Rank	Penalties	Total	Rank	Penalties	Total	Rank	Penalties	Total	Rank	Penalties	Rank
William Fox-Pitt	Chilli Morning	Individual	37.00	1	30.40	67.40	22	0.00	67.40	18 Q	0.00	67.40	12	67.40	12
Pippa Funnell	Billy The Biz	Individual	43.90	16	40.40	84.30	28	0.00	84.30	26	Did not advance			84.30	26
Kitty King	Ceylor	Individual	46.80	26	53.60	100.40	34	0.00	100.40	30	Did not advance			100.40	30
Gemma Tattersall	Quicklook	Individual	47.20 #	32	89.60 #	136.80	44	4.00 #	140.80 #	41	Did not advance			140.80	41
William Fox-Pitt; Pippa Funnell; Kitty King; Gemma Tattersall	See above	Team	127.70	4	124.40	252.10	8	0	252.10	5	—N/a			252.10	5

"#" indicates that the score of this rider does not count in the team competition, since only the best three results of a team are counted.

=== Jumping ===
Athlete	Horse	Event	Qualification								Final					Total	
Athlete	Horse	Event	Round 1		Round 2			Round 3			Round A		Round B			Total	
Athlete	Horse	Event	Penalties	Rank	Penalties	Total	Rank	Penalties	Total	Rank	Penalties	Rank	Penalties	Total	Rank	Penalties	Rank
Ben Maher	Tic Tac	Individual	4	=27 Q	4	8	=30 Q	1	9	=23 Q	4	=16 Q	13	17	25	17	25
Nick Skelton	Big Star	Individual	4	=27 Q	4	8	=30 Q	5	13	=33 Q	0	=1 Q	0	0	=1 JO	0	1st place, gold medalist(s)
John Whitaker	Ornellaia	Individual	0	=1 Q	23 #	23	57	Did not advance									
Michael Whitaker	Cassionato	Individual	4 #	=27 Q	5	9	=42 Q	Withdrew			Did not advance						
Ben Maher; Nick Skelton; John Whitaker; Michael Whitaker	See above	Team	8	=8	13	13	12	Did not advance			—N/a					13	12

"#" indicates that the score of this rider does not count in the team competition, since only the best three results of a team are counted.

== Fencing ==
British fencers qualified a full squad in the men's team foil by virtue of being the highest ranking team from Europe outside the world's top four in the FIE Olympic Team Rankings. A trio of men's foil fencers, James Davis, Laurence Halsted and Richard Kruse, along with their reserve Marcus Mepstead, were named to Team GB on 5 May 2016. In the men's individual foil Kruse came close to winning Great Britain's first medal of the Games, and its first fencing medal since the 1964 Games, finishing fourth after losing the bronze medal match to Timur Safin of Russia.

Athlete	Event	Round of 64	Round of 32	Round of 16	Quarterfinal	Semifinal	Final / BM	
Athlete	Event	Opposition Score	Opposition Score	Opposition Score	Opposition Score	Opposition Score	Opposition Score	Rank
James Davis	Men's foil	Bye	M Ferjani (TUN); W 15–7	Safin (RUS); L 10–15	Did not advance			
Laurence Halsted	Men's foil	Bye	Chen Hw (CHN); L 9–15	Did not advance				
Richard Kruse	Men's foil	Bye	Sintès (ALG); W 15–4	Cassarà (ITA); W 15–12	Meinhardt (USA); W 15–13	Massialas (USA); L 9–15	Safin (RUS); L 13–15	4
James Davis; Laurence Halsted; Richard Kruse; Marcus Mepstead	Men's team foil	—N/a			Russia; L 43–45	Classification semifinal Egypt; W 45–43	5th place final China; L 38–45	6

== Field hockey ==
Summary

Key:

- FT – After full-time.
- P – Match decided by penalty-shootout.

Team	Event	Group Stage						Quarterfinal	Semifinal	Final / BM	
Team	Event	Opposition Score	Opposition Score	Opposition Score	Opposition Score	Opposition Score	Rank	Opposition Score	Opposition Score	Opposition Score	Rank
Great Britain men's	Men's tournament	Belgium; L 1–4	New Zealand; D 2–2	Brazil; W 9–1	Australia; L 1–2	Spain; D 1–1	5	Did not advance			9
Great Britain women's	Women's tournament	Australia; W 2–1	India; W 3–0	Argentina; W 3–2	Japan; W 2–0	United States; W 2–1	1	Spain; W 3–1	New Zealand; W 3–0	Netherlands; W 2–0^{P} FT: 3–3	1st place, gold medalist(s)

=== Men's tournament ===
Great Britain's men's field hockey team qualified for the Olympics by having reached the last four at the 2014–15 Men's FIH Hockey World League Semifinals. Only three nations qualified through this route, but India had already secured qualification as continental champions after the team's success at the 2014 Asian Games, so that the remaining teams automatically received the three quotas.

Squad

The following is the Great Britain roster in the men's field hockey tournament of the 2016 Summer Olympics.

Head coach: Bobby Crutchley

1. George Pinner (GK)
5. David Ames
6. Henry Weir
7. Ashley Jackson
8. Simon Mantell
9. Harry Martin
11. Alastair Brogdon
12. Michael Hoare
13. Samuel Ward
14. Mark Gleghorne
16. Adam Dixon
17. Barry Middleton (C)
22. David Condon
24. Iain Lewers
26. Nicholas Catlin
27. Daniel Fox
31. Ian Sloan

Reserves:

- James Bailey
- Dan Shingles

Group play

Pos	Team	Pld	W	D	L	GF	GA	GD	Pts	Qualification
1	Belgium	5	4	0	1	21	5	+16	12	Quarter-finals
2	Spain	5	3	1	1	13	6	+7	10	Quarter-finals
3	Australia	5	3	0	2	13	4	+9	9	Quarter-finals
4	New Zealand	5	2	1	2	17	8	+9	7	Quarter-finals
5	Great Britain	5	1	2	2	14	10	+4	5	
6	Brazil (H)	5	0	0	5	1	46	−45	0	

Source: Rio2016
Rules for classification: 1) Points; 2) Matches won; 3) Goal difference; 4) Goals for; 5) Head-to-head result.
(H) Hosts

6 August 2016
12:30

Belgium	4–1	Great Britain
Truyens 5'; Cosyns 32'; Gougnard 35'; Charlier 56'	Report	Catlin 27'

Umpires:
John Weight (RSA)
Coen van Bunge (NED)

7 August 2016
17:00

Great Britain	2–2	New Zealand
Condon 2'; Middleton 25'	Report	Russell 14'; Phillips 19'

Umpires:
Marcin Grochal (POL)
Lim Hong Zhen (SIN)

9 August 2016
18:00

Brazil	1–9	Great Britain
Smith 4'	Report	Dixon 9'; Middleton 12', 54'; Jackson 27', 57'; Martin 37'; Ward 47', 59'; Gleghorne 56'

Umpires:
Chen Dekang (CHN)
Coen van Bunge (NED)

10 August 2016
20:30

Great Britain	1–2	Australia
Jackson 58'	Report	Zalewski 50'; Whetton 55'

Umpires:
Marcin Grochal (POL)
John Wright (RSA)

12 August 2016
17:00

Great Britain	1–1	Spain
Ward 15'	Report	Alegre 9'

Umpires:
Christian Blasch (GER)
Coen van Bunge (NED)

=== Women's tournament ===
Great Britain's women's field hockey team qualified for the Olympics by having achieved a top three finish at the 2014–15 Women's FIH Hockey World League Semifinals. As England also won the 2015 Women's EuroHockey tournament, Great Britain were treated as having qualified as European champions, and relinquished their Hockey World League qualification place to the highest ranking non qualified team, India.

Squad

The following is the Great Britain roster in the women's field hockey tournament of the 2016 Summer Olympics.

Head coach: Danny Kerry

No.	Pos.	Player	Date of birth (age)	Caps	Goals	Club
1	GK	Maddie Hinch	8 October 1988 (aged 27)			
4	DF	Laura Unsworth	8 March 1988 (aged 28)			
5	DF	Crista Cullen	20 August 1985 (aged 30)			
6	FW	Hannah Macleod	9 June 1984 (aged 32)			
7	MF	Georgie Twigg	21 November 1990 (aged 25)			
8	MF	Helen Richardson-Walsh	23 September 1981 (aged 34)			
9	MF	Susannah Townsend	28 July 1989 (aged 27)			
11	DF	Kate Richardson-Walsh (C)	9 May 1980 (aged 36)			
13	DF	Sam Quek	18 October 1988 (aged 27)			
15	FW	Alex Danson	21 May 1985 (aged 31)			
18	DF	Giselle Ansley	31 March 1992 (aged 24)			
19	FW	Sophie Bray	12 May 1990 (aged 26)			
20	DF	Hollie Webb	19 September 1990 (aged 25)			
24	MF	Shona McCallin	18 May 1992 (aged 24)			
26	FW	Lily Owsley	10 December 1994 (aged 21)			
28	MF	Nicola White	20 January 1988 (aged 28)			

Group play

Pos	Team	Pld	W	D	L	GF	GA	GD	Pts	Qualification
1	Great Britain	5	5	0	0	12	4	+8	15	Quarter-finals
2	United States	5	4	0	1	14	5	+9	12	Quarter-finals
3	Australia	5	3	0	2	11	5	+6	9	Quarter-finals
4	Argentina	5	2	0	3	12	6	+6	6	Quarter-finals
5	Japan	5	0	1	4	3	16	−13	1	
6	India	5	0	1	4	3	19	−16	1	

Source: Rio2016
Rules for classification: 1) Points; 2) Matches won; 3) Goal difference; 4) Goals for; 5) Head-to-head result.

6 August 2016
20:30

Great Britain	2–1	Australia
Owsley 26'; Danson 43'	Report	Morgan 33'

Umpires:
Laurine Delforge (BEL)
Irene Presenqui (ARG)

8 August 2016
18:00

India	0–3	Great Britain
	Report	Ansley 25'; White 27'; Danson 33'

Umpires:
Chieko Soma (JPN)
Amy Baxter (USA)

10 August 2016
13:30

Great Britain	3–2	Argentina
H. Richardson-Walsh 23', 25'; Bray 38'	Report	F. Habif 41', 42'

Umpires:
Michelle Meister (GER)
Miao Lin (CHN)

11 August 2016
20:30

Japan	0–2	Great Britain
	Report	Owsley 5'; White 55'

Umpires:
Kylie Seymour (AUS)
Elena Eskina (RUS)

13 August 2016
18:00

Great Britain	2–1	United States
Bray 53'; Danson 56'	Report	Vittese 39'

Umpires:
Amber Church (NZL)
Irene Presenqui (ARG)

Quarterfinal

15 August 2016
18:00

Great Britain	3–1	Spain
Twigg 8'; H. Richardson-Walsh 13'; Owsley 27'	Report	Oliva 53'

Umpires:
Kelly Hudson (NZL)
Melissa Trivic (AUS)

Semifinal

17 August 2016
17:00

New Zealand	0–3	Great Britain
	Report	Danson 22', 52'; H. Richardson-Walsh 48'

Umpires:
Carolina de la Fuente (ARG)
Michelle Joubert (RSA)

Gold medal match

19 August 2016
17:00

Netherlands	3–3	Great Britain
Van Male 16', 37'; Paumen 25'	Report	Owsley 10'; Cullen 26'; White 52'
Penalties
Bos (penalty shoot-out missed); Hoog (penalty shoot-out missed); Leurink (penalty shoot-out missed); Van Geffen (penalty shoot-out missed)	0–2	(penalty shoot-out missed) H. Richardson-Walsh; (penalty shoot-out missed) Danson; (penalty shoot-out scored) Bray; (penalty shoot-out missed) Unsworth; (penalty shoot-out scored) Webb

Umpires:
Michelle Joubert (RSA)
Laurine Delforge (BEL)

== Golf ==
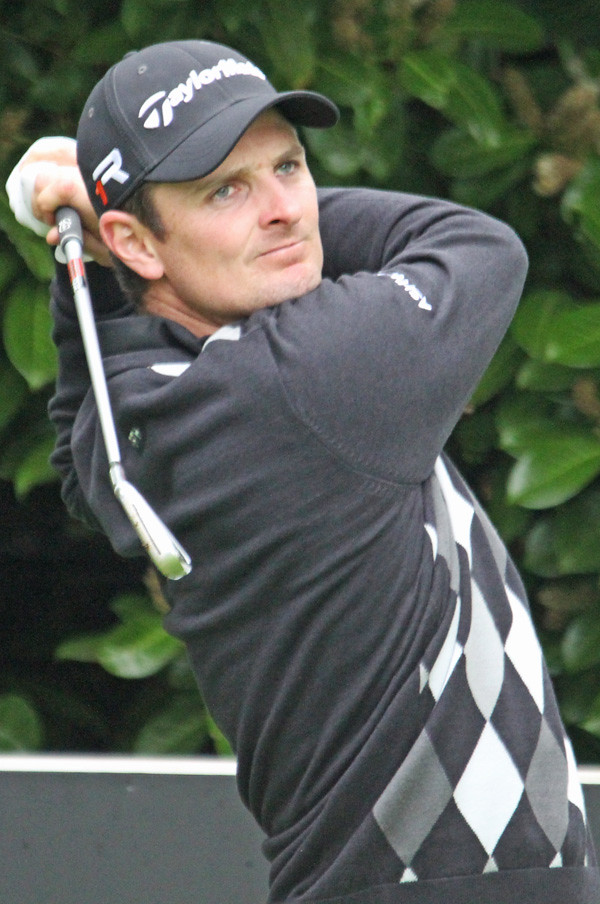
Justin Rose won first gold medal in golf since 1904

Great Britain entered four golfers (two per gender) into the Olympic tournament. Justin Rose (world no. 11), Danny Willett (world no. 9), Charley Hull (world no. 27) and Catriona Matthew (world no. 63) qualified directly among the top 60 eligible players for their respective individual events based on the IGF World Rankings as of 11 July 2016.

Athlete	Event	Round 1	Round 2	Round 3	Round 4	Total		
Athlete	Event	Score	Score	Score	Score	Score	Par	Rank
Justin Rose	Men's	67	69	65	67	268	−16	1st place, gold medalist(s)
Danny Willett	Men's	71	70	69	74	284	E	=37
Charley Hull	Women's	68	66	74	68	276	−8	=7
Catriona Matthew	Women's	71	66	77	70	284	E	29

== Gymnastics ==
=== Artistic ===
Great Britain qualified a full squad of five gymnasts in both the men's and women's artistic gymnastics events through top eight finishes in the team all-around competitions at the 2015 World Artistic Gymnastics Championships in Glasgow. BOA announced the men's and women's artistic gymnastic squads, highlighted by London 2012 medalists Louis Smith and Max Whitlock, for the Games on July 12, 2016.

Men
Team

Athlete	Event	Qualification								Final							
Athlete	Event	Apparatus						Total	Rank	Apparatus						Total	Rank
Athlete	Event	F	PH	R	V	PB	HB	Total	Rank	F	PH	R	V	PB	HB	Total	Rank
Brinn Bevan	Team	14.233	14.733	14.333	14.133	14.966	14.366	86.764	17	—N/a	14.866	14.466	15.033	14.933	—N/a	—N/a	
Louis Smith	Team	—N/a	15.700 Q	—N/a						—N/a	14.766	—N/a				—N/a	
Kristian Thomas	Team	15.233 Q	—N/a	14.166	14.233	—N/a	14.900	—N/a		15.033	—N/a		15.400	—N/a	14.833	—N/a	
Max Whitlock	Team	15.500 Q	15.800 Q	14.600	13.700	15.066	13.566	88.232	12 Q	15.400	15.991	14.500	14.966	14.500	14.500	—N/a	
Nile Wilson	Team	15.066	14.133	14.941	14.700	14.900	15.500 Q	89.240	5 Q	14.666	—N/a	15.100	—N/a	15.133	15.666	—N/a	
Total	Team	45.799	46.233	43.874	43.066	44.932	44.766	268.670	3 Q	45.099	45.623	44.066	45.399	44.566	44.999	269.752	4

Individual finals

Athlete	Event	Apparatus						Total	Rank
Athlete	Event	F	PH	R	V	PB	HB	Total	Rank
Louis Smith	Pommel horse	—N/a	15.833	—N/a				15.833	2nd place, silver medalist(s)
Kristian Thomas	Floor	15.058	—N/a					15.058	7
Max Whitlock	All-around	15.200	15.875	14.733	15.133	15.000	14.700	90.641	3rd place, bronze medalist(s)
Max Whitlock	Floor	15.633	—N/a					15.633	1st place, gold medalist(s)
Max Whitlock	Pommel horse	—N/a	15.966	—N/a				15.966	1st place, gold medalist(s)
Nile Wilson	All-around	14.900	14.066	14.933	15.000	15.700	14.966	89.565	8
Nile Wilson	Horizontal bar	—N/a					15.466	15.466	3rd place, bronze medalist(s)

Women
Team

Athlete	Event	Qualification						Final					
Athlete	Event	Apparatus				Total	Rank	Apparatus				Total	Rank
Athlete	Event	V	UB	BB	F	Total	Rank	V	UB	BB	F	Total	Rank
Ellie Downie	Team	14.833	14.633	14.500	12.500	56.466	24 Q	15.133	14.633	13.366	14.133	—N/a	
Rebecca Downie	Team	—N/a	15.233	13.300	—N/a			—N/a	15.400	14.166	—N/a	—N/a	
Claudia Fragapane	Team	14.766	12.533	13.400	14.333	55.032	30	14.700	—N/a	14.433	14.166	—N/a	
Ruby Harrold	Team	14.600	14.800	—N/a	13.633	—N/a		—N/a	14.833	—N/a		—N/a	
Amy Tinkler	Team	14.833	—N/a	14.500	14.600 Q	—N/a		14.933	—N/a		14.466	—N/a	
Total	Team	44.432	44.666	42.400	42.566	174.064	4 Q	44.766	44.866	41.965	42.765	174.362	5

Individual finals

Athlete	Event	Apparatus				Total	Rank
Athlete	Event	V	UB	BB	F	Total	Rank
Ellie Downie	All-around	15.100	13.783	13.700	14.300	56.883	13
Amy Tinkler	Floor	—N/a			14.933	14.933	3rd place, bronze medalist(s)

=== Trampoline ===
Great Britain qualified two gymnasts in the women's trampoline by virtue of a top eight finish at the 2015 World Championships in Odense, Denmark. Meanwhile, an Olympic berth was secured in the men's event by Nathan Bailey, who finished in the top six at the 2016 Olympic Test Event in Rio de Janeiro.

Athlete	Event	Qualification		Final	
Athlete	Event	Score	Rank	Score	Rank
Nathan Bailey	Men's	106.795	9	Did not advance	
Bryony Page	Women's	100.075	7 Q	56.040	2nd place, silver medalist(s)
Katherine Driscoll	Women's	100.295	5 Q	53.645	6

== Judo ==
Great Britain qualified a total of seven judokas for each of the following weight classes at the Games. Six of them (McKenzie, Oates, Smythe-Davis, Schlesinger, Conway, and Powell) were ranked among the top 22 eligible judokas for men and top 14 for women in the IJF World Ranking List of 30 May 2016, while Benjamin Fletcher earned a continental quota spot from the European region as Great Britain's top-ranked judoka outside of direct qualifying position. Team GB officially announced the judo team on 16 June 2016.

Men

Athlete	Event	Round of 64	Round of 32	Round of 16	Quarterfinals	Semifinals	Repechage	Final / BM	
Athlete	Event	Opposition Result	Opposition Result	Opposition Result	Opposition Result	Opposition Result	Opposition Result	Opposition Result	Rank
Ashley McKenzie	−60 kg	Bye	Özlü (TUR); W 003–000	Smetov (KAZ); L 000–001	Did not advance				
Colin Oates	−66 kg	Bye	Le Blouch (FRA); L 000–000 YUS	Did not advance					
Benjamin Fletcher	−100 kg	Bye	Gviniashvili (GEO); L 000–100	Did not advance					

Women

Athlete	Event	Round of 32	Round of 16	Quarterfinals	Semifinals	Repechage	Final / BM	
Athlete	Event	Opposition Result	Opposition Result	Opposition Result	Opposition Result	Opposition Result	Opposition Result	Rank
Nekoda Smythe-Davis	−57 kg	Filzmoser (AUT); W 001–000	Pavia (FRA); L 000–010	Did not advance				
Alice Schlesinger	−63 kg	Bak J-y (KOR); W 100–000	van Emden (NED); L 000–000 S	Did not advance				
Sally Conway	−70 kg	Miled (TUN); W 100–000	Émane (FRA); W 100–001	Bolder (ISR); W 100–000	Alvear (COL); L 000–010	Bye	Graf (AUT); W 001–000	3rd place, bronze medalist(s)
Natalie Powell	−78 kg	Bye	Mazouz (GAB); W 100–000	Tcheuméo (FRA); L 000–000 S	Did not advance	Malzahn (GER); L 000–100	Did not advance	7

== Modern pentathlon ==
British athletes qualified for the following spots to compete in modern pentathlon. If more than two competitors qualified in either the men's or women's event, selection for the two places available to each gender was to be made by the British Olympic Association in conjunction with Pentathlon GB. Freyja Prentice became the third British woman to qualify for Rio as a result of her world ranking at the end of May 2016. As the two previously qualified athletes failed to guarantee their selection at the 2016 World Modern Pentathlon Championships, the choice of which two women would go to the Games was determined by the selectors before the team was named on 8 June; in the event, London 2012 silver medalist Samantha Murray and rookie Kate French were selected.

Athlete	Event	Fencing (épée one touch)				Swimming (200 m freestyle)			Riding (show jumping)			Combined: shooting/running (10 m air pistol)/(3200 m)			Total points	Final rank
Athlete	Event	RR	BR	Rank	MP points	Time	Rank	MP points	Penalties	Rank	MP points	Time	Rank	MP Points	Total points	Final rank
Joe Choong	Men's	22–13	2	8	222	1:58.50	3	345	7	8	293	11:51.59	29	589	1451	9
Jamie Cooke	Men's	14–21	1	28	184	1:55:60 OR	1	354	7	11	288	11:31.07	20	609	1436	14
Kate French	Women's	17–18	0	18	202	2:16.17	15	292	0	1	300	12:43.08	8	537	1331	5*
Samantha Murray	Women's	14–21	8	25	192	2:10.81	4	308	21	22	279	12:38.54	7	542	1321	8*

* Promoted following the disqualification of a higher-ranked modern pentathlete for doping.

== Rowing ==
Great Britain qualified twelve out of fourteen boats for each of the following rowing classes into the Olympic regatta, with the majority of crews (except women's single & quadruple sculls) having confirmed Olympic places for their boats at the 2015 FISA World Championships in Lac d'Aiguebelette, France. They also had to have competed at the British Rowing Olympic Trials in Caversham (March 21 to 23) to assure their selection to the Olympic team for the Games.

A total of 43 rowers were officially named to Team GB's Olympic squad on June 9, 2016, with double silver medalist Frances Houghton aiming to appear at her fifth Olympics and London 2012 bronze medalist Alan Campbell racing in the single sculls at his fourth. The crew also featured reigning Olympic champions Helen Glover and Heather Stanning from the women's pair, and two-time gold medalists Pete Reed and Andrew Triggs Hodge from the men's four. A squad of twelve rowers, not including cox Phelan Hill was announced for the men's eight; Team GB announced at the same time that the men's pair, and two 'spares' or reserves, would be selected at a later date from those members of the twelve that were not seated in the largest boat. Following the breaking up of the women's double sculls partnership of Katherine Grainger and Victoria Thornley, and their failure thereafter to make the women's eight squad, the double sculls was also not announced, although selector David Tanner confirmed later that evening that the pair of Grainger and Thornley would be selected.

Men

Athlete	Event	Heats		Repechage		Quarterfinals		Semifinals		Final	
Athlete	Event	Time	Rank	Time	Rank	Time	Rank	Time	Rank	Time	Rank
Alan Campbell	Single sculls	7:08.31	1 QF	Bye		6:49.41	2 SA/B	7:09.54	4 FB	DNS	12
Stewart Innes; Alan Sinclair	Pair	6:50.77	2 SA/B	Bye		—N/a		6:26.37	2 FA	7.07.99	4
John Collins; Jonathan Walton	Double sculls	6:43.93	4 R	6:19.60	1 SA/B	—N/a		6:13.83	3 FA	7:01.25	5
Richard Chambers; Will Fletcher	Lightweight double sculls	6:25.62	2 SA/B	Bye		—N/a		6:38.76	4 FB	6:28.81	7
Alex Gregory; Constantine Louloudis; George Nash; Moe Sbihi	Four	5:55.59	1 SA/B	Bye		—N/a		6:17.13	1 FA	5:58.61	1st place, gold medalist(s)
Mark Aldred; Chris Bartley; Peter Chambers; Jono Clegg	Lightweight four	6:01.27	2 SA/B	Bye		—N/a		6:10.46	4 FB	6:31.54	7
Angus Groom; Peter Lambert; Sam Townsend; Jack Beaumont	Quadruple sculls	5:52.77	4 R	5:53.10	2 FA	—N/a				6:13.08	5
Paul Bennett; Scott Durant; Matt Gotrel; Matt Langridge; Tom Ransley; Pete Reed; Will Satch; Andrew Triggs Hodge; Phelan Hill (cox)	Eight	5:34.23	1 FA	Bye		—N/a				5:29.63	1st place, gold medalist(s)

Women

Athlete	Event	Heats		Repechage		Semifinals		Final	
Athlete	Event	Time	Rank	Time	Rank	Time	Rank	Time	Rank
Helen Glover; Heather Stanning	Pair	7:05.05	1 SA/B	Bye		7:18.69	1 FA	7:18.29	1st place, gold medalist(s)
Katherine Grainger; Victoria Thornley	Double sculls	7:05.32	2 SA/B	Bye		6:52.47	2 FA	7:41.05	2nd place, silver medalist(s)
Katherine Copeland; Charlotte Taylor	Lightweight double sculls	7:10.25	5 R	8:05.70	3 SC/D	7:59.11	1 FC	7:37.89	14
Karen Bennett; Olivia Carnegie-Brown; Jessica Eddie; Katie Greves; Frances Houghton; Zoe Lee; Polly Swann; Melanie Wilson; Zoe de Toledo (cox)	Eight	6:09.52	1 FA	Bye		—N/a		6:03.98	2nd place, silver medalist(s)

Qualification Legend: FA=Final A (medal); FB=Final B (non-medal); FC=Final C (non-medal); FD=Final D (non-medal); FE=Final E (non-medal); FF=Final F (non-medal); SA/B=Semifinals A/B; SC/D=Semifinals C/D; SE/F=Semifinals E/F; QF=Quarterfinals; R=Repechage

== Rugby sevens ==
In international competition the constituent nations of Great Britain ordinarily compete as separate unions representing England, Scotland and Wales. Northern Irish players who normally represent Ireland would have been eligible however the IRFU insisted that they do not play for Great Britain. For the purposes of qualification for the 2016 Olympics the three British unions agreed in advance of the 2013–14 men's and women's Sevens World Series that their highest-finishing teams in that season would represent all three unions in the first stage of qualification during the 2014–15 series. The England men's and women's teams earned the right to represent the British unions in that stage of their respective competitions.

=== Men's tournament ===
The England men's team secured a qualifying berth for Great Britain at the Olympics by having achieved one of the top four places in the 2014–15 Sevens World Series.

Squad

The following is the Great Britain roster in the men's rugby sevens tournament of the 2016 Summer Olympics.

Head coach: Simon Amor

No.	Pos.	Player	Country	Date of birth (age)	Events	Points	Union
1	FW	Mark Robertson	Scotland	30 December 1984 (aged 31)	47	426	Unattached
2	BK	Ruaridh McConnochie	England	23 October 1991 (aged 24)	9	45	Unattached
3	FW	Phil Burgess	England	1 July 1988 (aged 28)	22	212	Unattached
4	BK	Dan Norton	England	22 March 1988 (aged 28)	57	1,064	Unattached
5	FW	James Rodwell	England	23 August 1984 (aged 31)	69	445	Unattached
6	BK	Tom Mitchell (c)	England	22 July 1989 (aged 27)	34	897	(England) Harlequins
7	BK	Dan Bibby	England	6 February 1991 (aged 25)	25	321	Unattached
8	FW	James Davies	Wales	25 October 1990 (aged 25)	14	180	(Wales) Scarlets
9	BK	Ollie Lindsay-Hague	England	8 October 1990 (aged 25)	15	110	(England) Harlequins
10	FW	Sam Cross	Wales	26 August 1992 (aged 23)	27	170	(Wales) Newport
11	BK	Marcus Watson	England	27 June 1991 (aged 25)	32	424	(England) Newcastle Falcons
12	BK	Mark Bennett	Scotland	3 February 1993 (aged 23)	2	35	(Scotland) Glasgow Warriors

Group play

Pos	Team	Pld	W	D	L	PF	PA	PD	Pts	Qualification
1	Great Britain	3	3	0	0	73	45	+28	9	Quarter-finals
2	Japan	3	2	0	1	64	40	+24	7	Quarter-finals
3	New Zealand	3	1	0	2	59	40	+19	5	Quarter-finals
4	Kenya	3	0	0	3	19	90	−71	3	

Source: World Rugby
Rules for classification: 1) Points; 2) Head-to-head result; 3) Point difference; 4) Points scored.

9 August 2016
12:00

Great Britain	31–7	Kenya
Try: Norton 2' m Burgess 4' c Bibby (2) 6' m, 12' c Bennett 7' c Con: Mitchell (3/4); Bibby (0/1)	Report (Rio 2016); Report (World Rugby)	Try: Odhiambo 8' c Con: Adema (1/1)

Deodoro Stadium, Rio de Janeiro
Referee: Alexandre Ruiz (France)

9 August 2016
17:00

Great Britain	21–19	Japan
Try: Rodwell (2) 1' c, 2' c Watson 13' c Con: Mitchell (3/3)	Report (Rio 2016); Report (World Rugby)	Try: Lemeki (2) 6' c, 14' m Sakai 11' c Con: Goya (1/1); Sakai (1/2)

Deodoro Stadium, Rio de Janeiro
Referee: Nick Briant (New Zealand)

10 August 2016
12:30

New Zealand	19–21	Great Britain
Try: R. Ioane 9' m Ware 11' c Ormond 13' c Con: Kaka (2/3)	Report (Rio 2016); Report (World Rugby)	Try: Bennett 2' c Davies 5' c Norton 7' c Con: Mitchell (3/3)

Deodoro Stadium, Rio de Janeiro
Referee: Craig Joubert (South Africa)

Quarterfinal

10 August 2016
18:00

Great Britain	5–0 (a.e.t.)	Argentina
Try: Bibby 18'; Pen: Mitchell (0/1)	Report (Rio 2016); Report (World Rugby)	Pen: Revol (0/1)

Deodoro Stadium, Rio de Janeiro
Referee: Alexandre Ruiz (France)

Semifinal

11 August 2016
15:00

Great Britain	7–5	South Africa
Try: Norton 8' c Con: Mitchell (1/1)	Report (Rio 2016); Report (World Rugby)	Try: Brown 2' m Con: Afrika (0/1)

Deodoro Stadium, Rio de Janeiro
Referee: Richard Kelly (New Zealand)

Gold medal match

11 August 2016
19:00

(gold) Fiji	43–7	Great Britain (silver)
Try: Kolinisau 1' m Tuwai 3' c Veremalua 7' m Nakarawa 8' m Ravouvou 10' c Tuisova 14' c Mata 19' c Con: Ravouvou (1/2); Kolinisau (2/4); Taliga (1/1)	Report (Rio 2016); Report (World Rugby)	Try: Norton 16' c Con: Watson (1/1)

Deodoro Stadium, Rio de Janeiro
Referee: Rasta Rasivhenge (South Africa)

Team details

Fiji	Great Britain

P	3	Semi Kunatani
L	5	Leone Nakarawa
H	2	Jasa Veremalua
FL	7	Osea Kolinisau (c)
FH	10	Samisoni Viriviri
C	12	Masivesi Dakuwaqa
SH	9	Seremaia Tuwai
Substitutes:
P	1	Apisai Domolailai
L	4	Viliame Mata
N	8	Josua Tuisova
FL	6	Kitione Taliga
Head Coach:
(England) Ben Ryan

P	3	Phil Burgess
N	8	James Davies
L	5	James Rodwell
C	12	Mark Bennett
FL	7	Dan Bibby
FL	6	Tom Mitchell (c)
L	4	Dan Norton
Substitutes:
FH	10	Sam Cross
SH	9	Ollie Lindsay-Hague
P	1	Mark Robertson
W	11	Marcus Watson
H	2	Ruaridh McConnochie
Head Coach:
(England) Simon Amor

=== Women's tournament ===
The England women's team secured a qualifying berth for Great Britain at the Olympics by having achieved one of the top four places in the 2014–15 World Rugby Women's Sevens Series.

Squad

The following is the Great Britain squad in the women's rugby sevens tournament of the 2016 Summer Olympics.

Head coach: Simon Middleton

Backs		Forwards
1	(England) Claire Allan	2	(England) Abbie Brown
3	(England) Alice Richardson	6	(England) Katy McLean
4	(England) Emily Scarratt (c)	7	(England) Heather Fisher
5	(England) Danielle Waterman	12	(England) Amy Wilson-Hardy
8	(England) Emily Scott
9	(England) Natasha Hunt
10	(England) Joanne Watmore
11	(Wales) Jasmine Joyce

Group play

Pos	Team	Pld	W	D	L	PF	PA	PD	Pts	Qualification
1	Great Britain	3	3	0	0	91	3	+88	9	Quarter-finals
2	Canada	3	2	0	1	83	22	+61	7	Quarter-finals
3	Brazil (H)	3	1	0	2	29	77	−48	5	
4	Japan	3	0	0	3	10	111	−101	3	

Source: World Rugby
Rules for classification: 1) Points; 2) Head-to-head result; 3) Point difference; 4) Points scored.
(H) Hosts

6 August 2016
12:00

Great Britain	29–3	Brazil
Try: Watmore 5' c Hunt (2) 9' c, 12' m Joyce 14' m Scott 14' m Con: McLean (2/3); Watmore (0/2)	Report (Rio 2016); Report (World Rugby)	Pen: Kochhann (1/1) 7'

Deodoro Stadium, Rio de Janeiro
Referee: Alhambra Nievas (Spain)

6 August 2016
17:00

Great Britain	40–0	Japan
Try: Wilson-Hardy 1' c Richardson 4' c Watmore 6' c McLean 7' m Scott 10' c Fisher 16' c Con: Richardson (3/3); McLean (0/1); Scott (2/2)	Report (Rio 2016); Report (World Rugby)

Deodoro Stadium, Rio de Janeiro
Referee: Rasta Rasivhenge (South Africa)

7 August 2016
12:30

Canada	0–22	Great Britain
	Report (Rio 2016); Report (World Rugby)	Try: Richardson 4' m Wilson-Hardy 6' m Scarratt (2) 10' m, 12' c Con: Richardson (1/2); McLean (0/2)

Deodoro Stadium, Rio de Janeiro
Referee: Jess Beard (New Zealand)

Quarterfinal

7 August 2016
18:00

Great Britain	26–7	Fiji
Try: Brown (2) 1' c, 12' c Richardson 4' c Waterman 7' m Con: McLean (3/4)	Report (Rio 2016); Report (World Rugby)	Try: Naiqato 3' c Con: Tinai (1/1)

Deodoro Stadium, Rio de Janeiro
Referee: Alhambra Nievas (Spain)

Semifinal

8 August 2016
15:00

Great Britain	7–25	New Zealand
Try: Richardson 4' c Con: McLean (1/1)	Report (Rio 2016); Report (World Rugby)	Try: Woodman (3) 2' m, 7' m, 8' m Tui 5' m Manuel 10' m Con: Nathan-Wong (0/5)

Deodoro Stadium, Rio de Janeiro
Referee: Amy Perrett (Australia)

Bronze medal match

8 August 2016
18:30

(bronze) Canada	33–10	Great Britain
Try: Paquin 3' c Landry (2) 6' c, 16' c Farella 9' m Russell 10' c Con: Landry (4/5)	Report (Rio 2016); Report (World Rugby)	Try: Waterman 4' m Joyce 13' m Con: McLean (0/1); Richardson (0/1)

Deodoro Stadium, Rio de Janeiro
Referee: Amy Perrett (Australia)

== Sailing ==
Great Britain qualified one boat for each of the following classes at the 2014 ISAF Sailing World Championships, bringing the maximum quota of 15 sailors, in ten boats. The sailors who secured the quotas for Great Britain were not necessarily the athletes who would be selected to represent their country in these events. On 9 September 2015, Team GB announced the names of the first six sailors to be selected for places at the Rio 2016 regatta. Five more sailors were added to the list of confirmed athletes for Rio on 8 March 2016, with the windsurfer Nick Dempsey appearing at his fifth Olympics. The men's 470 (Patience & Grube) and 49er (Fletcher & Sign) crews completed the Team GB's sailing lineup for the Olympics on 4 May 2016.

Men

Athlete	Event	Race													Net points	Final rank
Athlete	Event	1	2	3	4	5	6	7	8	9	10	11	12	M*	Net points	Final rank
Nick Dempsey	RS:X	1	1	2	1	4	~~8~~; ~~RDG~~	2	5	8	5	7	8	8	52	2nd place, silver medalist(s)
Nick Thompson	Laser	8	17	9	15	2	1	~~24~~	7	6	22	—N/a		16	103	6
Giles Scott	Finn	~~17~~	3	2	1	11	1	1	3	8	2	—N/a		4	36	1st place, gold medalist(s)
Chris Grube; Luke Patience	470	21	5	5	6	1	~~27~~	20	4	3	4	—N/a		6	75	5
Dylan Fletcher; Alain Sign	49er	15	10	7	~~20~~	14	4	5	6	9	1	6	3	20	100	6

Women

Athlete	Event	Race													Net points	Final rank
Athlete	Event	1	2	3	4	5	6	7	8	9	10	11	12	M*	Net points	Final rank
Bryony Shaw	RS:X	7	~~20~~	9	7	14	12	3	5	2	4	4	4	12	83	9
Alison Young	Laser Radial	13	17	12	~~26~~	6	9	7	10	16	1	—N/a		2	93	8
Saskia Clark; Hannah Mills	470	4	7	1	6	1	~~8~~	1	3	2	3	—N/a		16	44	1st place, gold medalist(s)
Sophie Ainsworth; Charlotte Dobson	49erFX	2	11	5	8	7	10	2	5	9	~~15~~	14	8	20	101	8

Mixed

Athlete	Event	Race													Net points	Final rank
Athlete	Event	1	2	3	4	5	6	7	8	9	10	11	12	M*	Net points	Final rank
Ben Saxton; Nicola Groves	Nacra 17	3	4	2	7	5	3	13	12	~~16~~	15	15	12	18	109	9

M = Medal race; RDG = Redress given; EL = Eliminated – did not advance into the medal race

== Shooting ==
British shooters achieved quota places for the following events by virtue of their best finishes at the 2014 and 2015 ISSF World Championships, the 2015 ISSF World Cup series, and European Championships or Games, as long as they obtained a minimum qualifying score (MQS) by March 31, 2016.

On 10 November 2015, Team GB announced the names of the six sport shooters to compete at the Games.

Athlete	Event	Qualification		Semifinal		Final	
Athlete	Event	Points	Rank	Points	Rank	Points	Rank
Tim Kneale	Men's double trap	139	3 Q	26 (+2)	3 q	28	4
Edward Ling	Men's trap	120	2 Q	12 (+3)	4 q	13	3rd place, bronze medalist(s)
Steven Scott	Men's double trap	138	4 Q	26 (+2)	3 q	30	3rd place, bronze medalist(s)
Elena Allen	Women's skeet	64	14	Did not advance			
Amber Hill	Women's skeet	70	5 Q	13	6	Did not advance	
Jennifer McIntosh	Women's 10 m air rifle	414.7	15	—N/a		Did not advance	
Jennifer McIntosh	Women's 50 m rifle 3 positions	578	18	—N/a		Did not advance	

Qualification Legend: Q = Qualify for the next round; q = Qualify for the bronze medal (shotgun)

== Swimming ==
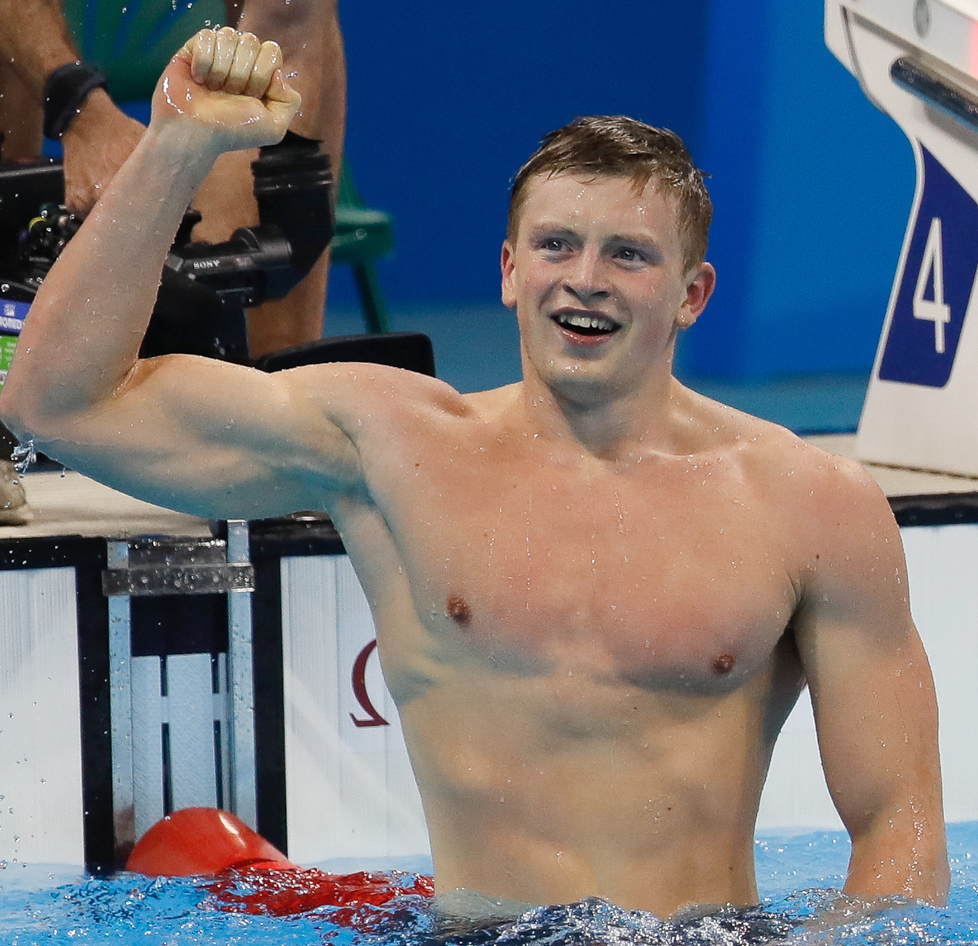
Adam Peaty broke his own world record two times to take gold medal in the 100 m breaststroke

British swimmers achieved qualifying standards in the following events (up to a maximum of 2 swimmers in each event at the Olympic Qualifying Time (OQT), or potentially 1 at the Olympic Selection Time (OST)): All British swimmers had to qualify by finishing in the top two of the Olympic trials having gained the GB qualifying A standard set by British Swimming in the relevant final (that time being the fastest time of the sixteenth fastest swimmer internationally in that event in 2015).

Great Britain secured its first spot for Rio 2016 when Jack Burnell finished fifth in the 10 km (6.2 mi) open water marathon at the 2015 FINA World Championships. Meanwhile, in the pool, British swimmers earned places for Rio in all the relay events at the same meet with the exception of the women's 4 × 100 m freestyle relay; therefore, they will rely on the ranking times for one of the final four places available in these events.

On 21 April 2016, British Swimming announced the final squad of 26 swimmers for the Olympics. Among them were 2015 World champions Adam Peaty and James Guy, Commonwealth champion Jazmin Carlin, and incoming three-time Olympians Robbie Renwick and Hannah Miley.

Men

Athlete	Event	Heat		Semifinal		Final	
Athlete	Event	Time	Rank	Time	Rank	Time	Rank
Craig Benson	200 m breaststroke	2:11.19	15 Q	2:10.93	13	Did not advance	
Jack Burnell	10 km open water	—N/a				DSQ	
James Guy	200 m freestyle	1:46.13	5 Q	1:46.23	8 Q	1:45.49	4
James Guy	400 m freestyle	3:45.31	5 Q	—N/a		3:44.68	6
James Guy	100 m butterfly	51.78	=8 Q	52.10	14	Did not advance	
Cameron Kurle	200 m freestyle	1:49.08	35	Did not advance			
Max Litchfield	400 m individual medley	4:11.95	5 Q	—N/a		4:11.62	4
Ieuan Lloyd	200 m individual medley	1:59.74	15 Q	1:59.49	10	Did not advance	
Stephen Milne	400 m freestyle	3:46.00	17	—N/a		Did not advance	
Stephen Milne	1500 m freestyle	14:57.23	10	—N/a		Did not advance	
Ross Murdoch	100 m breaststroke	59.47	3 Q	1:00.05	11	Did not advance	
Adam Peaty	100 m breaststroke	57.55 WR	1 Q	57.62	1 Q	57.13 WR	1st place, gold medalist(s)
Benjamin Proud	50 m freestyle	21.83	7 Q	21.54 NR	5 Q	21.68	4
Benjamin Proud	100 m freestyle	49.14	29	Did not advance			
Duncan Scott	100 m freestyle	48.01 NR	3 Q	48.20	7 Q	48.01	5
Timothy Shuttleworth	1500 m freestyle	15:13.01	27	—N/a		Did not advance	
Chris Walker-Hebborn	100 m backstroke	53.54	10 Q	53.75	11	Did not advance	
Daniel Wallace	200 m individual medley	1:59.44	11 Q	1:57.97	5 Q	1:58.54	8
Andrew Willis	200 m breaststroke	2:08.92	3 Q	2:07.73	2 Q	2:07.78	4
James Guy; Stephen Milne; Robbie Renwick*; Duncan Scott; Daniel Wallace	4 × 200 m freestyle relay	7:06.31	1 Q	—N/a		7:03.13 NR	2nd place, silver medalist(s)
James Guy; Adam Peaty; Duncan Scott; Chris Walker-Hebborn	4 × 100 m medley relay	3:30.47 NR	1 Q	—N/a		3:29.24 NR	2nd place, silver medalist(s)

* – Indicates athlete swam in the preliminaries but not in the final race. Qualifiers for the latter rounds (Q) of all events were decided on a time only basis, therefore positions shown are overall results versus competitors in all heats.

Women

Athlete	Event	Heat		Semifinal		Final	
Athlete	Event	Time	Rank	Time	Rank	Time	Rank
Jazmin Carlin	400 m freestyle	4:02.88	2 Q	—N/a		4:01.23	2nd place, silver medalist(s)
Jazmin Carlin	800 m freestyle	8:19.67	3 Q	—N/a		8:16.17	2nd place, silver medalist(s)
Georgia Coates	200 m freestyle	1:59.33	27	did not advance			
Georgia Davies	100 m backstroke	59.86	7 Q	59.85	10	did not advance	
Eleanor Faulkner	200 m freestyle	2:00.51	32	did not advance			
Francesca Halsall	50 m freestyle	24.26	2 Q	24.41	4 Q	24.14	4
Camilla Hattersley	800 m freestyle	8:33.65	15	—N/a		did not advance	
Hannah Miley	200 m individual medley	2:11.84	12 Q	2:12.15	=12	did not advance	
Hannah Miley	400 m individual medley	4:33.74	4 Q	—N/a		4:32.54	4
Siobhan-Marie O'Connor	200 m individual medley	2:08.44	2 Q	2:07.57 NR	1 Q	2:06.88 NR	2nd place, silver medalist(s)
Keri-anne Payne	10 km open water	—N/a				1:57:23.9	7
Molly Renshaw	100 m breaststroke	1:07.92	23	did not advance			
Molly Renshaw	200 m breaststroke	2:23.37	5 Q	2:22.33 NR	3 Q	2:22.72	6
Chloe Tutton	100 m breaststroke	1:06.88	12 Q	1:07.29	12	did not advance	
Chloe Tutton	200 m breaststroke	2:23.34	4 Q	2:22.71	7 Q	2:22.34	4
Aimee Willmott	200 m butterfly	2:09.71	19	did not advance			
Aimee Willmott	400 m individual medley	4:34.08	5 Q	—N/a		4:35.04	7
Jazmin Carlin; Georgia Coates; Eleanor Faulkner; Camilla Hattersley	4 × 200 m freestyle relay	7:54.17	9	—N/a		did not advance	
Georgia Coates; Georgia Davies; Siobhan-Marie O'Connor; Chloe Tutton	4 × 100 m medley relay	3:59.34	8 Q	—N/a		3:56.96 NR	7

Qualifiers for the latter rounds (Q) of all events were decided on a time only basis, therefore positions shown are overall results versus competitors in all heats.

== Synchronized swimming ==
Great Britain was able to submit a squad of two synchronized swimmers to compete only in the women's duet, after picking up one of four spare berths freed by the continental selection for being the next highest ranking nation at the FINA Olympic test event in Rio de Janeiro. Katie Clark and Olivia Federici, who were both part of the Great Britain lineup for the team event at the 2012 Games, were confirmed as the British representatives in May 2016.

Athlete	Event	Free routine (preliminary)		Technical routine			Free routine (final)		
Athlete	Event	Points	Rank	Points	Total (technical + free)	Rank	Points	Total (technical + free)	Rank
Katie Clark; Olivia Federici	Duet	79.9667	18	80.7650	160.7317	17	did not advance		

== Table tennis ==
Great Britain qualified a team of three athletes for the table tennis competition at the Games. London 2012 Olympians Paul Drinkhall and Liam Pitchford were automatically selected among the top 22 eligible players in the men's singles based on the ITTF Olympic Rankings. On 3 June 2016, Sam Walker was named as the third member of the Great Britain team, with Tom Jarvis also named, as travelling reserve.

Athlete	Event	Preliminary	Round 1	Round 2	Round 3	Round of 16	Quarterfinals	Semifinals	Final / BM	
Athlete	Event	Opposition Result	Opposition Result	Opposition Result	Opposition Result	Opposition Result	Opposition Result	Opposition Result	Opposition Result	Rank
Paul Drinkhall	Men's singles	Bye	Karakašević (SRB); W 4–1	Gao N (SIN); W 4–3	Gaćina (CRO); W 4–2	Samsonov (BLR); L 2–4	did not advance			
Liam Pitchford	Men's singles	Bye		Kenjaev (UZB); W 4–1	Jung Y-s (KOR); L 1–4	did not advance				
Paul Drinkhall; Liam Pitchford; Sam Walker	Men's team	—N/a				France; W 3–2	China; L 0–3	did not advance		

== Taekwondo ==
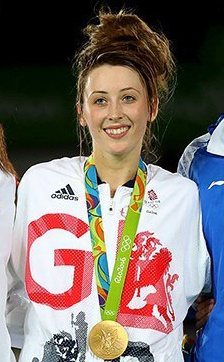
Jade Jones successfully defend her Olympic title in Women's −57 kg

Great Britain fielded a squad of four athletes into the taekwondo competition at the Olympics by finishing in the top 6 of the WTF Olympic rankings in their respective classes. Defending Olympic champion Jade Jones, and former World and reigning European champion Bianca Walkden qualified automatically for their respective weight classes. The quota secured in the men's 80 kg category could be allocated to either Lutalo Muhammad or Damon Sansum, and was at the discretion of British Taekwondo in collaboration with the British Olympic Association; in the event, the higher ranked Muhammad got the nod on 22 June 2016. The remaining British spot was awarded to Mahama Cho in the men's heavyweight category (+80 kg) by virtue of his top two finish at the 2016 European Qualification Tournament in Istanbul, Turkey.

Athlete	Event	Round of 16	Quarterfinals	Semifinals	Repechage	Final / BM	
Athlete	Event	Opposition Result	Opposition Result	Opposition Result	Opposition Result	Opposition Result	Rank
Lutalo Muhammad	Men's −80 kg	Shkara (AUS); W 14–0 PTG	López (USA); W 9–2	Beigi (AZE); W 12–7	Bye	Cisse (CIV); L 6–8	2nd place, silver medalist(s)
Mahama Cho	Men's +80 kg	Obame (GAB); W 12–6	Mardani (IRI); W 4–3 SUD	Isayev (AZE); L 1–4	Bye	Siqueira (BRA); L 4–5	5
Jade Jones	Women's −57 kg	Bakkal (MAR); W 12–4	Asemani (BEL); W 7–2	Glasnović (SWE); W 9–4	Bye	Calvo (ESP); W 16–7	1st place, gold medalist(s)
Bianca Walkden	Women's +67 kg	S Kassman (PNG); W 14–1 PTG	Mandić (SRB); W 5–0	Zheng Sy (CHN); L 1–4 SUD	Bye	Dislam (MAR); W 7–1	3rd place, bronze medalist(s)

== Tennis ==
Great Britain entered four tennis players into the Olympic tournament. Reigning Olympic champion Andy Murray (world no. 2), along with returning Olympian Heather Watson (world no. 56) from London 2012 and rookie Johanna Konta (world no. 18), qualified directly among the top 56 eligible players for their respective singles events based on the ATP and WTA World Rankings as of 6 June 2016. Murray also teamed up with his older brother Jamie in the men's doubles by virtue of the latter's top-10 ATP ranking.

On 1 July 2016, the International Tennis Federation announced that further places would be allocated to Kyle Edmund in the men's singles, and the pair of Colin Fleming and Dominic Inglot in the men's doubles.

Men

Athlete	Event	Round of 64	Round of 32	Round of 16	Quarterfinals	Semifinals	Final / BM	
Athlete	Event	Opposition Score	Opposition Score	Opposition Score	Opposition Score	Opposition Score	Opposition Score	Rank
Kyle Edmund	Singles	Thompson (AUS); W 6–4, 6–2	Daniel (JPN); L 6–4, 7–5	did not advance				
Andy Murray	Singles	Troicki (SRB); W 6–3, 6–2	Mónaco (ARG); W 6–3, 6–1	Fognini (ITA); W 6–1, 2–6, 6–3	Johnson (USA); W 6–0, 4–6, 7–6^{(7–2)}	Nishikori (JPN); W 6–1, 6–4	del Potro (ARG); W 7–5, 4–6, 6–2, 7–5	1st place, gold medalist(s)
Colin Fleming; Dominic Inglot	Doubles	—N/a	González / Reyes-Varela (MEX); L 3–6, 0–6	did not advance				
Andy Murray; Jamie Murray	Doubles	—N/a	Bellucci / Sá (BRA); L 6–7^{(6–8)}, 6–7^{(14–16)}	did not advance				

Women

Athlete	Event	Round of 64	Round of 32	Round of 16	Quarterfinals	Semifinals	Final / BM	
Athlete	Event	Opposition Score	Opposition Score	Opposition Score	Opposition Score	Opposition Score	Opposition Score	Rank
Johanna Konta	Singles	Vogt (LIE); W 6–3, 6–1	Garcia (FRA); W 6–2, 6–3	Kuznetsova (RUS); W 3–6, 7–5, 7–5	Kerber (GER); L 1–6, 2–6	did not advance		
Heather Watson	Singles	Peng S (CHN); W 6–4, 6–7^{(5–7)}, 6–3	Svitolina (UKR); L 3–6, 6–1, 3–6	did not advance				
Johanna Konta; Heather Watson	Doubles	—N/a	Janković / Krunić (SRB); W 6–1, 6–2	Chan H-c / Chan Y-j (TPE); L 6–3, 0–6, 4–6	did not advance			

Mixed

Athlete	Event	Round of 16	Quarterfinals	Semifinals	Final / BM	
Athlete	Event	Opposition Score	Opposition Score	Opposition Score	Opposition Score	Rank
Johanna Konta; Jamie Murray	Doubles	Mattek-Sands / Sock (USA); L 4–6, 3–6	did not advance			
Heather Watson; Andy Murray	Doubles	Suárez Navarro / Ferrer (ESP); W 6–3, 6–3	Mirza / Bopanna (IND); L 4–6, 4–6	did not advance		

== Triathlon ==
British triathletes qualified for the following events at the 2016 Olympic Games. Gordon Benson secured a quota in the men's triathlon event as a result of winning the gold medal at the 2015 European Games, while Non Stanford and Vicky Holland added two more quotas to the British team in the women's triathlon event by finishing second and third at the ITU World Qualification Event in Rio de Janeiro. Stanford and Holland then assured themselves places on the British team in accordance with the selection criteria set by the British Triathlon Federation, by finishing second and third in the ITU World Triathlon Grand Final in Chicago. Two times world champion Helen Jenkins was confirmed as the third British athlete for the women's event over Commonwealth Games champion Jodie Stimpson, following victory for Jenkins in the World Triathlon Series event in Gold Coast, Australia, used by Great Britain as a selection event, and brothers Alistair and Jonathan Brownlee, who both won medals at the previous Games, were chosen for the men's event. European Games gold medalist Gordon Benson was the last triathlete to be selected for the Games on 7 June 2016, selected to fill the quota place he had won for Great Britain at those Games.

Athlete	Event	Swim (1.5 km)	Trans 1	Bike (40 km)	Trans 2	Run (10 km)	Total Time	Rank
Gordon Benson	Men's	18:09	0:53	did not finish				
Alistair Brownlee	Men's	17:24	0:50	55:04	0:34	31:09	1:45:01	1st place, gold medalist(s)
Jonathan Brownlee	Men's	17:24	0:50	55:04	0:33	31:16	1:45:07	2nd place, silver medalist(s)
Vicky Holland	Women's	19:09	0:54	1:01:26	0:38	34:54	1:57:01	3rd place, bronze medalist(s)
Helen Jenkins	Women's	19.11	0:56	1:04:37	0:38	35:45	2:01:07	19
Non Stanford	Women's	19:10	0:53	1:01:25	0:41	34:55	1:57.04	4

== Weightlifting ==
Great Britain qualified one male and one female weightlifter for the Rio Olympics by virtue of a top seven national finish (for men) and top six (for women), respectively, at the 2016 European Championships. The team were required to allocate these places to individual athletes by 20 June 2016.

First-time Olympians Sonny Webster and Rebekah Tiler were named to Team GB's weightlifting team for the Games on 29 June 2016.

Athlete	Event	Snatch		Clean & Jerk		Total	Rank
Athlete	Event	Result	Rank	Result	Rank	Total	Rank
Sonny Webster	Men's −94 kg	148	14	185	13	333	14
Rebekah Tiler	Women's −69 kg	101	9	126	10	227	10

== Sports not contested by Great Britain in Rio ==
=== Basketball ===
Neither the men's nor the women's team qualified. The men's team failed to qualify for the finals of EuroBasket from which European qualification was made, while the women finished last in their EuroBasket Women 2015 group to leave both the Eurobasket competition and Olympic qualification.

=== Football ===
Following the appearance of a British team in both the men's and women's tournaments as the nation hosted the 2012 Summer Olympics in London, the Football Association initially indicated it was unlikely that a men's team would be entered to take part in the Rio Olympics as the component nations of Great Britain were to compete separately in the men's 2015 European Under-21 Championship which acted as the qualifying competition. However, in February 2015, the FA indicated a change in its policy, championed by Gareth Southgate, the England under-21 coach, who held the view that, as the only global tournament for that age group (there is no FIFA under 21/under 23 World Cup), the Olympic tournament would provide valuable experience for the players. As a consequence, the FA indicated its willingness to the BOA to run a men's team for the Olympic Games.

England women's national football team qualified for the 2015 FIFA Women's World Cup but is not an Olympic member nation, as they are part of Great Britain. Although England were one of the top three European teams, the last Olympic spot went to the fourth-best UEFA team. The Football Association had originally declared on 2 March 2015 its intention to enter and run teams on behalf of the British Olympic Association at the 2016 Olympics should England qualify. However, following strong objections from the Scottish, Welsh and Northern Irish football associations, as well as a commitment from FIFA that they would not allow entry of a British team unless all four Home Nations were in agreement, the Football Association announced on 30 March 2015 that they would not seek entry into the Olympic tournament.

=== Handball ===
Team GB did not qualify.

=== Volleyball ===
Team GB had no qualified teams.

=== Water polo ===
Team GB did not qualify.

=== Wrestling ===
Great Britain did not qualify any athletes.

== See also ==
- Great Britain at the 2016 Summer Paralympics
