= Stéphanie Brieussel =

French equestrian

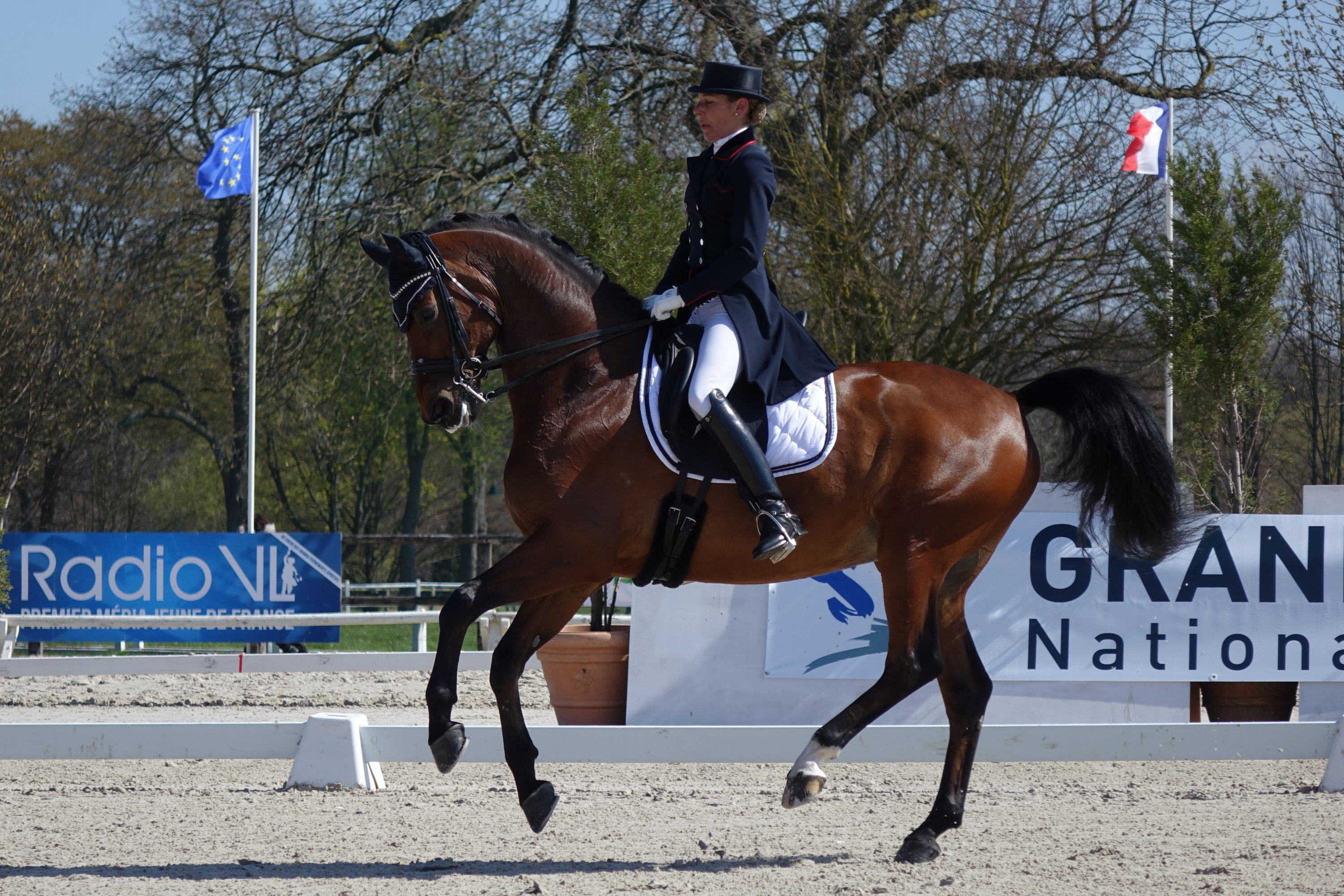
- Brieussel in 2016

Personal information
- Born: 29 January 1974 (age 52) Saint-Denis, France
- Height: 1.69 m (5 ft 7 in)
- Weight: 55 kg (121 lb)

Stéphanie Brieussel (born 29 January 1974) is a French Olympic dressage rider. Representing France, she competed at the 2016 Summer Olympics in Rio de Janeiro, where she finished 55th in the individual and 8th in the team competitions.
