= Ludovic Henry =

French equestrian

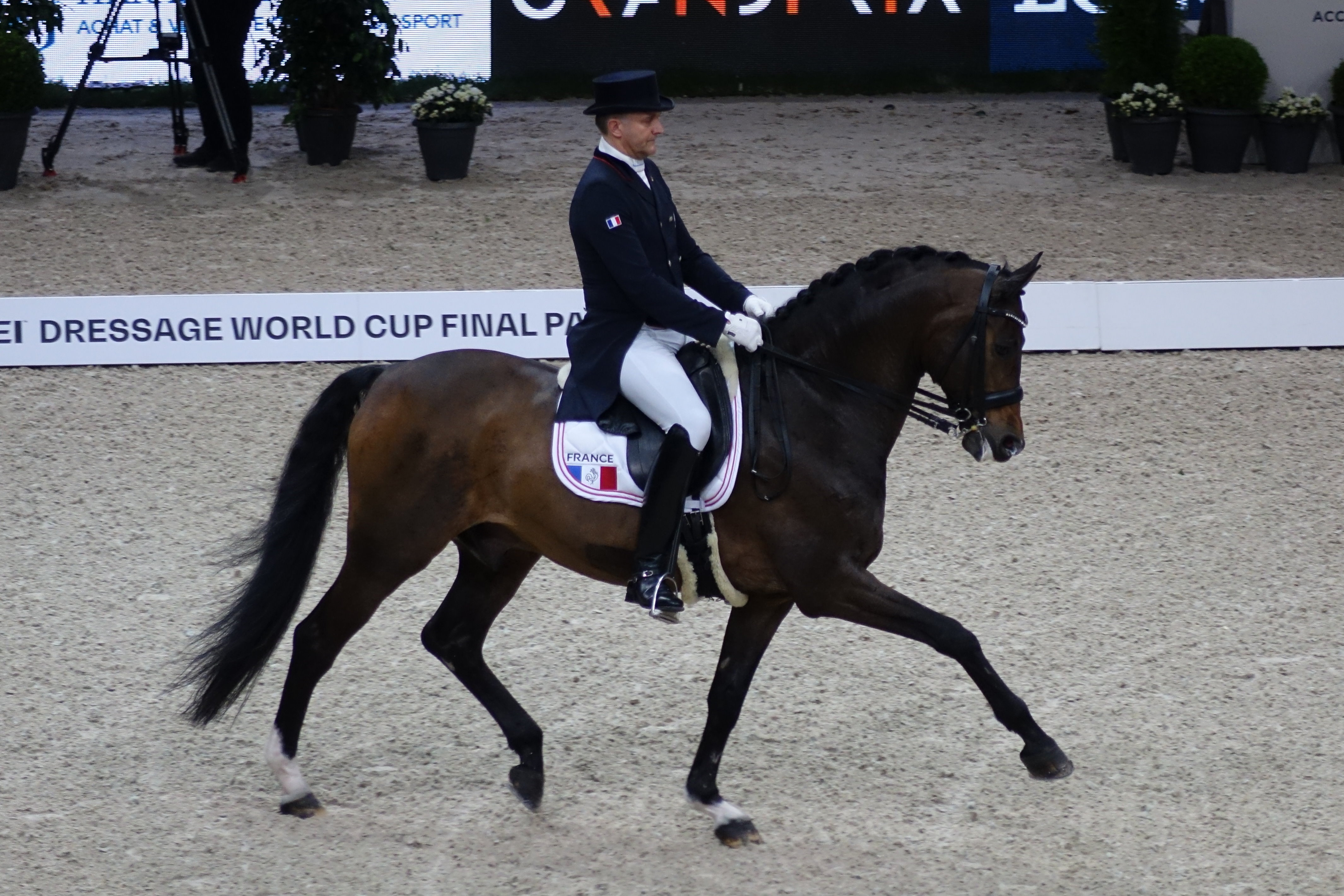
- Henry in 2018

Personal information
- Born: 4 October 1968 (age 58) Le Mesnil-Saint-Denis, France
- Height: 1.95 m (6 ft 5 in)
- Weight: 88 kg (194 lb)

Ludovic Henry (born 4 October 1968) is a French Olympic dressage rider. Representing France, he competed at the 2016 Summer Olympics in Rio de Janeiro where he finished 40th in the individual and 8th in the team competition.

Henry also competed at the 2015 European Dressage Championships where he placed 6th in the team and 43rd in the individual competition.
