= Sue Hearn =

Australian equestrian

Personal information
- Full name: Suzanne Hearn
- Born: 13 February 1956 (age 70) Blacktown, New South Wales
- Height: 165 cm (5 ft 5 in)
- Weight: 68 kg (150 lb)

Sport
- Country: Australia
- Sport: Equestrian
- Event: Dressage
- Club: Bowral Dressage Club

Suzanne Hearn (born 13 February 1956) is an Australian Olympic dressage rider. Representing Australia, she competed at the 2016 Summer Olympics in Rio de Janeiro, where she finished 54th in the individual and 9th in the team competition.

At age of 60, she became the second oldest Australian debuting Olympian, behind sailor Harold Brooke who made his debut as a 61-year old at the 1960 Summer Olympics.

In February 2019, Hearn won the CDI4* Grand Prix in Bawley Point, the first ever 4* dressage competition held on the Southern hemisphere.

== Notable horses ==
- Remmington – 2002 Brown Australian Warmblood Gelding (River Dance x Imperial Prince)
  - 2016 Olympics – Team 9th Place, Individual 54th Place
  - 2016 Aachen Nations Cup – Team 8th Place, Individual 29th Place
  - 2018 Melbourne World Cup – 1st Place
