= Severo Jurado =

Spanish equestrian (born 1988)

Severo Jurado López
Personal information
- Full name: Severo Jesus Jurado López
- Born: 9 September 1988 (age 37) Seville, Spain
- Website: juradodressage.com

Sport
- Country: Spain
- Sport: Equestrian

Achievements and titles
- Olympic finals: Rio de Janeiro 2016, Tokyo 2020
Medal record
Equestrian
Representing Spain
World Championships for Young Horses
Gold medal – first place	2015 Verden	Individual dressage 5 years old horses
Gold medal – first place	2016 Ermelo	Individual dressage 6 years old horses
Gold medal – first place	2017 Ermelo	Individual dressage 7 years old horses
Gold medal – first place	2018 Ermelo	Individual dressage 6 years old horses
Gold medal – first place	2019 Ermelo	Individual dressage 7 years old horses
Bronze medal – third place	2017 Ermelo	Individual dressage 6 years old horses

Severo Jurado Lopez (born 9 September 1988) is a Spanish Olympic dressage rider. Representing Spain, he competed at the 2016 Summer Olympics in Rio de Janeiro where he finished 5th in the individual and 7th in the team competitions. His Olympic horse was the chestnut gelding Lorenzo. He was also part of the Spanish Olympic team during the 2020 Summer Olympics, finishing 38th in the Grand Prix and 21st in the Grand Prix Special with his horse Fendi.

In 2015, 2016 and 2017 he won the World Championship for Young Horses with Fiontini. In 2017 he got the bronze medal in the World Championships for Young Horses with Quel Filou. In 2018 he won the World Championships for Young Horses with D'Avie.

Severo has competed in the European Championship on Deep Impact (De Niro x Rubinstein) in 2017 in Gothenburg (Sweden) and also the World Equestrian Games in Tryon (USA) in 2018.

== Controversies ==
In 2024, he was accused of being involved in a money laundering network, headed by Alessandro Bazzoni and Siri Evjemo-Nysveen, dedicated to the purchase of polo horses with money from corruption in the Venezuelan oil company PDVSA through the companies CGC One Planet and Clareville Grove Capital.
