= Giovana Pass =

Brazilian equestrian

Personal information
- Born: March 30, 1998 (age 28)

Giovana Prado Pass (born March 30, 1998) is a Brazilian Olympic dressage rider. Representing Brazil, she competed at the 2016 Summer Olympics in Rio de Janeiro where she finished 47th in the individual and 10th in the team competitions.
