= Equestrian at the 2016 Summer Olympics – Team dressage =

Team dressage at the Games of the XXXI Olympiad
- Venue: National Equestrian Center
- Date: 10–12 August 2016
- Competitors: 36 from 9 nations
- Overall average: 81.936%

Medalists
| 1st place, gold medalist(s) | | Sönke Rothenberger; Dorothee Schneider; Kristina Bröring-Sprehe; Isabell Werth | Germany |
| 2nd place, silver medalist(s) | | Spencer Wilton; Fiona Bigwood; Carl Hester; Charlotte Dujardin | Great Britain |
| 3rd place, bronze medalist(s) | | Allison Brock; Kasey Perry-Glass; Steffen Peters; Laura Graves | United States |

The team dressage in equestrian at the 2016 Summer Olympics in Rio de Janeiro was held at National Equestrian Center from 10 to 12 August.

== Competition format ==
The team and individual dressage competitions used the same results. Dressage had three phases, with only the first two used in the team competition. The first phase was the Grand Prix. The top six teams advanced to the second phase, the Grand Prix Special. The results of that phase (ignoring the previous Grand Prix scores) produced the final results.

== Schedule ==
Times are Brasília time, BRT (UTC−03:00)

| Date | Time | Round |
|---|---|---|
| Wednesday 10 August 2016; Thursday, 11 August 2016 | 10:00 | Grand Prix |
| Friday, 12 August 2016 | 10:00 | Grand Prix Special |

== Results ==
| Rank | Name | Horse | GP Score | | GPS Score | | Overall Average |
| Rank | Name | Horse | Individual Average | Team Average | Individual Average | Team Average | Overall Average |
|---|---|---|---|---|---|---|---|
| 1st place, gold medalist(s) | Germany; Sönke Rothenberger; Dorothee Schneider; Kristina Bröring-Sprehe; Isabell Werth | Cosmo; Showtime FRH; Desperados FRH; Weihegold Old | 77.329; 80.986; 82.257; 80.643 | 81.295 | 76.261; 82.619; 81.401; 83.711 | 82.577 | 81.936 |
| 2nd place, silver medalist(s) | Great Britain; Spencer Wilton; Fiona Bigwood; Carl Hester; Charlotte Dujardin | Super Nova II; Orthilia; Nip Tuck; Valegro | 72.686; 77.157; 75.529; 85.071 | 79.252 | 73.613; 74.342; 76.485; 82.983 | 77.937 | 78.595 |
| 3rd place, bronze medalist(s) | United States; Allison Brock; Kasey Perry-Glass; Steffen Peters; Laura Graves | Rosevelt; Dublet; Legolas 92; Verdades | 72.686; 75.229; 77.614; 78.071 | 76.971 | 73.824; 73.235; 74.622; 80.644 | 76.363 | 76.667 |
| 4 | Netherlands; Adelinde Cornelissen; Edward Gal; Diederik van Silfhout; Hans Peter Minderhoud | Parzival; Voice; Arlando; Johnson | RT; 75.271; 75.900; 76.957 | 76.043 | — 73.655; 76.092; 75.224 | 74.991 | 75.517 |
| 5 | Sweden; Mads Hendeliowitz; Juliette Ramel; Patrik Kittel; Tinne Vilhelmson-Silfvén | Jimmie Choo SEQ; Buriel K.H. Deja; Don Aurelio | 71.771; 74.943; 74.586; 76.429 | 75.319 | 71.681; 72.045; 73.866; 77.199 | 74.370 | 74.845 |
| 6 | Denmark; Anders Dahl; Agnete Kirk Thinggaard; Cathrine Dufour; Anna Kasprzak | Selten HW; Jojo AZ; Cassidy; Donnperignon | 69.900; 72.229; 76.657; 73.943 | 74.276 | 71.232; 72.465; 76.050; 74.524 | 74.346 | 74.311 |
| 7 | Spain; Claudio Castilla Ruiz; Daniel Martin Dockx; Severo Jurado; Beatriz Ferrer-Salat | Alcaide; Grandioso; Lorenzo; Delgado | 69.814; 70.829; 76.429; 74.829 | 74.029 | did not advance | | |
| 8 | France; Ludovic Henry; Stéphanie Brieussel; Pierre Volla; Karen Tebar | After You; Amorak; Badinda Altena; Don Luis | 69.214; 65.114; 71.500; 75.029 | 71.914 | did not advance | | |
| 9 | Australia; Sue Hearn; Mary Hanna; Lyndal Oatley; Kristy Oatley | Remmington; Boogie Woogie; Sandro Boy; Du Soleil | 65.343; 69.643; 70.186; 68.900 | 69.576 | did not advance | | |
| 10 | Brazil; Pedro de Almeida; Giovana Pass; Luiza de Almeida; João Victor Marcari Oliva | Xaparro do Vouga; Zingaro de Lyw; Vendaval; Xamã dos Pinhais | 65.714; 67.700; 66.914; 68.071 | 67.562 | did not advance | | |
| 11 | Japan; Akane Kuroki; Kiichi Harada; Masanao Takahashi; Yuko Kitai | Toots; Egistar; Fabriano; Don Lorean | 66.900; 68.286; 62.986; 67.271 | 67.486 | did not advance | | |

.
