= Allison Brock =

American equestrian

Allison M. Brock
Personal information
- Born: 7 December 1979 (age 46) Honolulu, Hawaii, United States
- Height: 1.68 m (5 ft 6 in)
- Weight: 58 kg (128 lb)

Sport
- Country: United States
- Sport: Equestrianism
Medal record
Equestrian
Representing United States
Olympic Games
| Bronze medal – third place | 2016 Rio de Janeiro | Team dressage |

Allison M. Brock (born 7 December 1979) is an American equestrian. She represented her country at the 2016 Summer Olympics, winning a bronze medal in team dressage.
