= Kasey Perry-Glass =

American equestrian

Personal information
- Born: October 12, 1987 (age 38) Sacramento, California, United States
- Height: 1.63 m (5 ft 4 in)
- Weight: 58 kg (128 lb)
- Website: www.kpgdressage.com

Sport
- Country: United States
- Sport: Equestrianism
Medal record
Equestrian
Representing United States
Olympic Games
Bronze medal – third place	2016 Rio de Janeiro	Team dressage
World Championships
Silver medal – second place	2018 Tryon	Team dressage

Kasey Perry-Glass (born October 12, 1987) is an American equestrian. She represented her country at the 2016 Summer Olympics.
