= Spencer Wilton =

British equestrian (born 1973)

Personal information
- Nationality: British
- Born: 1 February 1973 (age 53)
- Height: 1.83 m (6 ft 0 in)
- Weight: 83 kg (183 lb)

Sport
- Country: United Kingdom
- Sport: Equestrianism
Medal record
Representing Great Britain
Olympic Games
Silver medal – second place	2016 Rio de Janeiro	Team dressage
World Championships
Bronze medal – third place	2018 Tryon	Team dressage

Spencer Wilton (born 1 February 1973) is a British equestrian. He represented his country at the 2016 Summer Olympics.

Together with the British dressage team, he won silver medal at the 2016 Summer Olympics on his horse Super Nova II.

== International Championship Results ==
Results
Year	Event	Horse	Score	Placing	Notes
2016	Olympic Games	Super Nova II	72.686%	2nd place, silver medalist(s)	Team
2016	Olympic Games	Super Nova II	73.613%	21st	Individual
2017	European Championships	Super Nova II	72.086%	4th	Team
2017	European Championships	Super Nova II	76.078%	6th	Individual Special
2017	European Championships	Super Nova II	75.443%	13th	Individual Freestyle
2018	World Equestrian Games	Super Nova II	74.581%	3rd place, bronze medalist(s)	Team
