= Team dressage at the 2014 FEI World Equestrian Games =

The team dressage at the 2014 World Equestrian Games in Normandy was held at Stade Michel d'Ornano on 25 and 26 August 2014.

German team won gold medal, their first World Equestrian Games gold in team dressage since 2006. The silver medal was won by the British team while the Dutch team, the defending champions, won the bronze medal.

== Competition format ==
The team scores were based on the Grand Prix results. In order to compete, team had to have three or four riders entered. Grand Prix results were also used for the individual dressage competition.

== Schedule ==
All times are Central European Summer Time (UTC+2)

Date	Time	Round
Monday, 25 August 2014	08:00	Grand Prix (Day 1)
Tuesday, 26 August 2014	08:00	Grand Prix (Day 2)

== Results ==
Rank	Country			Total
Rank	Rider	Horse	% Score	Total
1st place, gold medalist(s)	Germany			241.700
1st place, gold medalist(s)	Isabell Werth	Bella Rose	81.529	241.700
1st place, gold medalist(s)	Helen Langehanenberg	Damon Hill	81.357	241.700
1st place, gold medalist(s)	Kristina Sprehe	Desperados	78.814	241.700
1st place, gold medalist(s)	Fabienne Lütkemeier	D'Agostino	73.586#	241.700
2nd place, silver medalist(s)	Great Britain			231.343
2nd place, silver medalist(s)	Charlotte Dujardin	Valegro	85.271	231.343
2nd place, silver medalist(s)	Carl Hester	Nip Tuck	74.186	231.343
2nd place, silver medalist(s)	Michael Eilberg	Half Moon Delphi	71.886	231.343
2nd place, silver medalist(s)	Gareth Hughes	Stenkjers Nadonna	69.714#	231.343
3rd place, bronze medalist(s)	Netherlands			227.400
3rd place, bronze medalist(s)	Adelinde Cornelissen	Parzival	79.629	227.400
3rd place, bronze medalist(s)	Hans Peter Minderhoud	Johnson	74.357	227.400
3rd place, bronze medalist(s)	Diederik van Silfhout	Arlando	73.414	227.400
3rd place, bronze medalist(s)	Edward Gal	Voice	72.414#	227.400
4	United States			222.714
4	Steffen Peters	Legolas	75.843	222.714
4	Laura Graves	Verdades	74.871	222.714
4	Adrienne Lyle	Wizard	72.000	222.714
4	Tina Konyot	Calecto	69.643#	222.714
5	Spain			221.800
5	Morgan Barbançon	Painted Black	75.143	221.800
5	Jose Daniel Martin Dockx	Grandioso	74.243	221.800
5	José Antonio Garcia Mena	Norte Lovera	72.414	221.800
5	Borja Carrascosa	Hicksteadt	66.143#	221.800
6	Sweden			221.386
6	Tinne Vilhelmson-Silfvén	Don Auriello	76.186	221.386
6	Patrik Kittel	Scandic	74.086	221.386
6	Minna Telde	Santana	71.114	221.386
6	Jeanna Högberg	Darcia	69.657#	221.386
7	Denmark			218.028
7	Anna Kasprzak	Donnperignon	74.457	218.028
7	Nathalie zu Sayn-Wittgenstein	Digby	72.771	218.028
7	Lars Petersen	Mariett	70.800	218.028
7	Mikala Münter Gundersen	My Lady	70.271#	218.028
8	Austria			213.229
8	Victoria Max-Theurer	Augustin	77.114	213.229
8	Renate Voglsang	Fabriano	69.329	213.229
8	Christian Schumach	Picardo	66.786	213.229
8	Karin Kosak	Lucy's Day	66.043#	213.229
9	Canada			211.714
9	Belinda Trussell	Anton	71.614	211.714
9	David Marcus	Capital	70.357	211.714
9	Megan Lane	Caravella	69.743	211.714
9	Karen Pavicic	Don Daiquiri	69.486#	211.714
10	Australia			210.829
10	Mary Hanna	Sancette	70.929	210.829
10	Lyndal Oatley	Sandro Boy	70.600	210.829
10	Maree Tomkinson	Diamantina	69.300	210.829
10	Kristy Oatley	Ronan	63.771#	210.829
11	France			210.615
11	Arnaud Serre	Robinson de Lafont de Massa	72.843	210.615
11	Marc Boblet	Noble Dream	70.686	210.615
11	Jessica Michel	Riwera de Hus	67.086	210.615
11	Alexandre Ayache	Lights of Londonderry	66.886#	210.615
12	Belgium			209.557
12	Claudia Fassaert	Donnerfee	70.386	209.557
12	Jeroen Devroe	Eres	70.214	209.557
12	Laurence Vanommeslaghe	Avec Plaisir	68.957	209.557
12	Julie de Deken	Lucky Dance	66.486#	209.557
13	Switzerland			208.514
13	Marcela Krinke-Susmelj	Molberg	73.186	208.514
13	Melanie Hofmann	Cazzago	67.671	208.514
13	Caroline Häcki	Rigoletto Royal	67.657	208.514
13	Hans Staub	Warbeau	66.114#	208.514
14	Finland			206.486
14	Terhi Stegars	Axis	69.257	206.486
14	Eevamaria Porthan-Broddell	Solos Lacan	68.700	206.486
14	Mikaela Lindh	Mas Guapo	68.529	206.486
14	Stella Hagelstam	Chopin	65.500#	206.486
15	Italy			205.271
15	Valentina Truppa	Eremo del Castegno	73.814	205.271
15	Ester Soldi	Harmonia	66.300	205.271
15	Leonardo Tiozzo	Randon	65.157	205.271
15	Federica Scolari	Beldonwelt	64.429#	205.271
16	Portugal			202.686
16	Carlos Pinto	Soberano	68.800	202.686
16	Maria Caetano	Xiripiti	67.186	202.686
16	Filipe Canelas	Der Clou	66.700	202.686
16	Manuel Veiga	Ben Hur Da Broa	65.543#	202.686
17	Poland			200.843
17	Beata Stremler	Rubicon	67.343	200.843
17	Anna Lukasik	Stella Pack Ganda	67.257	200.843
17	Zaneta Skowronska	Mystery	66.243	200.843
18	Russia			200.700
18	Inessa Merkulova	Mister X	71.157	200.700
18	Marina Aframeeva	Vosk	67.629	200.700
18	Tatiana Dorofeeva	Kartsevo Upperville	61.914	200.700
19	Ukraine			198.829
19	Inna Logutenkova	Don Gregorius	69.229	198.829
19	Svetlana Kiseliova	Parish	66.814	198.829
19	Maksim Kovshov	Flirt	62.786	198.829
20	South Africa			194.929
20	Nicole Smith	Victoria	68.757	194.929
20	Chere Burger	Adelparg Anders	64.929	194.929
20	Denise Hallion	Wervelwind	61.243	194.929
20	Tanya Seymour	Ramoneur	55.257#	194.929
21	Norway			194.386
21	Lillann Jebsen	Pro-Set	68.057	194.386
21	Trude Hestengen	Tobajo Pik Disney	67.543	194.386
21	Ellen Birgitte Farbrot	Akon Askelund	58.786	194.386
22	Ireland			194.057
22	Roland Tong	Pompidou	66.900	194.057
22	Anna Merveldt	Vancouver	64.800	194.057
22	James Connor	Casino Royal	62.357	194.057
22	Judy Reynolds	Vancouver	61.086#	194.057
21	Luxembourg			192.829
21	Sascha Schulz	Wito Corleone	66.086	192.829
21	Veronique Henschen	Fontalero	65.457	192.829
21	Diane Erpelding	Woltair	61.286	192.829
24	Brazil			188.429
24	João Victor Oliva	Signo Dos Pinhais	63.843	188.429
24	Manuel de Almeida	Vinheste	63.057	188.429
24	Pedro de Almeida	Sambo	61.529	188.429
24	Luiza de Almeida	Pastor	EL#	188.429
