= Individual dressage at the 2014 FEI World Equestrian Games =

The individual dressage at the 2014 World Equestrian Games in Normandy was held at Stade Michel d'Ornano from 25 to 29 August.

Great Britain's Charlotte Dujardin won gold medal in both Grand Prix Special and Grand Prix Freestyle while Helen Langehanenberg won silver medal in both events for Germany. The bronze in Special was won by Kristina Sprehe of Germany while the bronze in Freestyle went to Adelinde Cornelissen representing the Netherlands.

== Competition format ==
The team and individual dressage competitions used the same results. Dressage had three phases. The first phase was the Grand Prix. Top 30 individuals advanced to the second phase, the Grand Prix Special where the first individual medals were awarded. The last set of medals in dressage at the 2014 World Equestrian Games was awarded after the third phase, the Grand Prix Freestyle where top 15 combinations competed.

== Schedule ==
All times are Central European Summer Time (UTC+2)

Date	Time	Round
Monday, 25 August 2014	08:00	Grand Prix (Day 1)
Tuesday, 26 August 2014	08:00	Grand Prix (Day 2)
Wednesday, 27 August 2014	09:00	Grand Prix Special
Friday, 29 August 2014	13:35	Grand Prix Freestyle

== Results ==
Rider	Nation	Horse	GP score	Rank	GPS score	Rank	GPF score	Rank
Charlotte Dujardin	Great Britain	Valegro	85.271	1 Q	86.120	(gold) Q	92.161	1st place, gold medalist(s)
Helen Langehanenberg	Germany	Damon Hill	81.357	3 Q	84.468	(silver) Q	88.286	2nd place, silver medalist(s)
Adelinde Cornelissen	Netherlands	Parzival	79.629	4 Q	79.328	4 Q	85.714	3rd place, bronze medalist(s)
Kristina Sprehe	Germany	Desperados	78.814	5 Q	79.762	(bronze) Q	83.125	4
Laura Graves	United States	Verdades	74.871	10 Q	77.157	8 Q	82.036	5
Victoria Max-Theurer	Austria	Augustin	77.114	6 Q	77.857	6 Q	81.036	6
Tinne Vilhelmson-Silfvén	Sweden	Don Auriello	76.186	7 Q	78.235	5 Q	80.375	7
Michael Eilberg	Great Britain	Half Moon Delphi	71.886	25 Q	75.462	13 Q	79.696	8
Anna Kasprzak	Denmark	Donnperignon	74.457	11 Q	77.269	7 Q	78.929	9
Steffen Peters	United States	Legolas	75.843	8 Q	75.742	10 Q	77.321	10
Diederik van Silfhout	Netherlands	Arlando	73.414	18 Q	75.924	9 Q	77.286	11
Carl Hester	Great Britain	Nip Tuck	74.186	14 Q	75.532	12 Q	76.589	12
Nathalie zu Sayn-Wittgenstein	Denmark	Digby	72.771	21 Q	75.406	14 Q	76.143	13
Hans Peter Minderhoud	Netherlands	Johnson	74.357	12 Q	75.630	11 Q	75.554	14
Morgan Barbançon	Spain	Painted Black	75.143	9 Q	74.902	15 Q	74.393	15
Marcela Krinke-Susmelj	Switzerland	Molberg	73.186	19 Q	74.874	16		
Patrik Kittel	Sweden	Scandic	74.086	15 Q	74.860	17		
Jose Daniel Martin Dockx	Spain	Grandioso	74.243	13 Q	74.090	18		
Fabienne Lütkemeier	Germany	D'Agostino	73.586	17 Q	74.062	19		
Valentina Truppa	Italy	Eremo del Castegno	73.814	16 Q	73.922	20		
José Antonio Garcia Mena	Spain	Norte Lovera	72.414	22 Q	72.689	21		
Belinda Trussell	Canada	Anton	71.614	26 Q	72.409	22		
Minna Telde	Sweden	Santana	71.114	28 Q	71.359	23		
Marc Boblet	France	Noble Dream	70.686	31 Q	70.924	24		
Edward Gal	Netherlands	Voice	72.414	22 Q	70.392	25		
Inessa Merkulova	Russia	Mister X	71.157	27 Q	70.252	26		
Arnaud Serre	France	Robinson de Lafont de Massa	72.843	20 Q	70.084	27		
Lars Petersen	Denmark	Mariett	70.800	30 Q	69.706	28		
Mary Hanna	Australia	Sancette	70.929	29 Q	69.314	29		
Adrienne Lyle	United States	Wizard	72.000	24 Q	69.202	30		
Isabell Werth	Germany	Bella Rose	81.529	2	WD	–		
Lyndal Oatley	Australia	Sandro Boy	70.600	32				
Claudia Fassaert	Belgium	Donnerfee	70.386	33				
David Marcus	Canada	Capital	70.357	34				
Mikala Münter Gundersen	Denmark	My Lady	70.271	35				
Jeroen Devroe	Belgium	Eres	70.214	36				
Megan Lane	Canada	Caravella	69.743	37				
Gareth Hughes	Great Britain	Stenkjers Nadonna	69.714	38				
Jeanna Högberg	Sweden	Darcia	69.657	39				
Tina Konyot	United States	Calecto	69.643	40				
Karen Pavicic	Canada	Don Daiquiri	69.486	41				
Renate Voglsang	Austria	Fabriano	69.329	42				
Maree Tomkinson	Australia	Diamantina	69.300	43				
Terhi Stegars	Finland	Axis	69.257	44				
Inna Logutenkova	Ukraine	Don Gregorius	69.229	45				
Laurence Vanommeslaghe	Belgium	Avec Plaisir	68.957	46				
Carlos Pinto	Portugal	Soberano	68.800	47				
Nicole Smith	South Africa	Victoria	68.757	48				
Eevamaria Porthan-Broddell	Finland	Solos Lacan	68.700	49				
Mikaela Lindh	Finland	Mas Guapo	68.529	50				
Lillann Jebsen	Norway	Pro-Set	68.057	51				
Janette Bouman	Kazakhstan	v.Power	67.800	52				
Melanie Hofmann	Switzerland	Cazzago	67.671	53				
Caroline Häcki	Switzerland	Rigoletto Royal	67.657	54				
Marina Aframeeva	Russia	Vosk	67.629	55				
Trude Hestengen	Norway	Tobajo Pik Disney	67.543	56				
Beata Stremler	Poland	Rubicon	67.343	57				
Anna Lukasik	Poland	Stella Pack Ganda	67.257	58				
Maria Caetano	Portugal	Xiripiti	67.186	59				
Jessica Michel	France	Riwera de Hus	67.086	60				
Roland Tong	Ireland	Pompidou	66.900	61				
Alexandre Ayache	France	Lights of Londonderry	66.886	62				
Svetlana Kiseliova	Ukraine	Parish	66.814	63				
Christian Schumach	Austria	Picardo	66.786	64				
Filipe Canelas	Portugal	Der Clou	66.700	65				
Kim Dong-seon	South Korea	Bukowski	66.543	66				
Julie de Deken	Belgium	Lucky Dance	66.486	67				
Christian Brühe	Palestine	Cinco de Mayo	66.329	68				
Ester Soldi	Italy	Harmonia	66.300	69				
Zaneta Skowronska	Poland	Mystery	66.243	70				
Borja Carrascosa	Spain	Hicksteadt	66.143	71				
Hans Staub	Switzerland	Warbeau	66.114	72				
Sascha Schulz	Luxembourg	Wito Corleone	66.086	73				
Karin Kosak	Austria	Lucy's Day	66.043	74				
Manuel Veiga	Portugal	Ben Hur Da Broa	65.543	75				
Stella Hagelstam	Finland	Chopin	65.500	76				
Dina Ellermann	Estonia	Landy's Akvarel	65.457	77				
Veronique Henschen	Luxembourg	Fontalero	65.457	77				
Leonardo Tiozzo	Italy	Randon	65.157	79				
Grete Barake	Estonia	Talent	65.043	80				
Yassine Rahmouni	Morocco	Floresco	64.986	81				
Chere Burger	South Africa	Adelprag Anders	64.929	82				
Anna Merveldt	Ireland	Vancouver	64.800	83				
Federica Scolari	Italy	Beldonwelt	64.429	84				
João Victor Oliva	Brazil	Signo Dos Pinhais	63.843	85				
Kristy Oatley	Australia	Ronan	63.771	86				
Manuel de Almeida	Brazil	Vinheste	63.057	87				
Maksim Kovshov	Ukraine	Flirt	62.786	88				
James Connor	Ireland	Casino Royal	62.357	89				
Tatiana Dorofeeva	Russia	Kartsevo Upperville	61.914	90				
Pedro de Almeida	Brazil	Samba	61.529	91				
Diane Erpelding	Luxembourg	Woltair	61.286	92				
Denise Hallion	South Africa	Wervelwind	61.243	93				
Judy Reynolds	Ireland	Vancouver	61.086	94				
Sergey Buikevich	Kazakhstan	Ispovednik	59.643	95				
Maria Ines Garcia	Colombia	Kupfermann	59.000	96				
Ellen Birgitte Farbrot	Norway	Akon Askelund	58.786	97				
Tanya Seymour	South Africa	Ramoneur	55.257	98				
Joanne Vaughan	Georgia	Elmegardens Marquis	RET	–				
Luiza de Almeida	Brazil	Pastor	EL	–				
