= Individual dressage at the 2013 European Dressage Championships =

The individual dressage at the 2013 European Dressage Championship in Herning, Denmark was held at MCH Arena from 21 to 25 August.

Great Britain's Charlotte Dujardin won the gold medal in both Grand Prix Special and Grand Prix Freestyle. Helen Langehanenberg representing Germany won a silver medal in both Grand Prix Freestyle and Grand Prix Special. Adelinde Cornelissen of Netherlands won a bronze in special and in the Freestyle as well. In the Grand Prix Germany won the golden team medal, while the Netherlands won the silver medal and Great Britain bronze.

== Competition format ==
The team and individual dressage competitions used the same results. Dressage had three phases. The first phase was the Grand Prix. Top 30 individuals advanced to the second phase, the Grand Prix Special where the first individual medals were awarded. The last set of medals at the 2013 European Dressage Championships was awarded after the third phase, the Grand Prix Freestyle where top 15 combinations competed, with a maximum of the three best riders per country.

== Judges ==
The following judges were appointed to officiate during the European Dressage Championships.

- (Denmark) Leif Törnblad (Ground Jury President)
- (Australia) Susan Hoevenaars (Ground Jury Member)
- (Netherlands) Francis Verbeek- van Rooy (Ground Jury Member)
- (United Kingdom) Andrew Ralph Gardner (Ground Jury Member)
- (France) Isabelle Judet (Ground Jury Member)
- (Germany) Dietrich Plewa (Ground Jury Member)
- (Sweden) Gustaf Svalling (Ground Jury Member)
- (Germany) Gotthilf Riexinger (Technical Delegate)

== Schedule ==
All times are Central European Summer Time (UTC+2)

| Date | Time | Round |
|---|---|---|
| Wednesday, 21 August 2013 | 14:30 | Grand Prix (Day 1) |
| Thursday, 22 August 2013 | 08:00 | Grand Prix (Day 2) |
| Friday, 23 August 2013 | 09:00 | Grand Prix Special |
| Sunday, 25 August 2013 | 13:30 | Grand Prix Freestyle |

== Results ==
| Rider | Nation | Horse | GP score | Rank | GPS score | Rank | GPF score | Rank |
|---|---|---|---|---|---|---|---|---|
| Charlotte Dujardin | Great Britain | Valegro | 85.942 | 1 Q | 85.699 | (gold) Q | 91.250 | 1st place, gold medalist(s) |
| Helen Langehanenberg | Germany | Damon Hill | 84.337 | 2 Q | 84.330 | (silver) Q | 87.286 | 2nd place, silver medalist(s) |
| Edward Gal | Netherlands | Glock's Undercover | 81.763 | 3 Q | 79.479 | 4 Q | 84.911 | 4 |
| Adelinde Cornelissen | Netherlands | Parzival | 80.851 | 4 Q | 81.548 | (bronze) Q | 86.393 | 3rd place, bronze medalist(s) |
| Nathalie zu Sayn-Wittgenstein | Denmark | Digby | 76.003 | 5 Q | 73.735 | 11 Q | 79.554 | 9 |
| Anna Kasprzak | Denmark | Donnperignon | 75.881 | 6 Q | 76.682 | 7 Q | 80.161 | 7 |
| Carl Hester | Great Britain | Uthopia | 75.334 | 7 Q | 78.497 | 5 Q | 81.696 | 6 |
| Isabell Werth | Germany | Don Johnson FRH | 75.213 | 8 Q | 71.890 | 20 | | |
| Kristina Bröring-Sprehe | Germany | Desparados FRH | 75.061 | 9 Q | 79.345 | 5 Q | 81.875 | 5 |
| Tinne Vilhelmson-Silfvén | Sweden | Don Auriello | 75.046 | 10 Q | 76.220 | 8 Q | 80.071 | 8 |
| Victoria Max-Theurer | Austria | Augustin OLD | 74.772 | 10 Q | 75.119 | 10 Q | 75.518 | 12 |
| Valentina Truppa | Italy | Fixdesign Eremo del Castegno | 73.860 | 12 Q | 71.830 | 21 | | |
| Patrik Kittel | Sweden | Toy Story | 73.283 | 13 Q | 72.148 | 17 | | |
| Fabienne Lütkemeier | Germany | D´Agostino 5 | 73.237 | 14 Q | 75.818 | 9 Q | 77.411 | 10 |
| Andreas Helgstrand | Denmark | Akeem Foldager | 72.720 | 15 Q | 71.116 | 23 | | |
| Michael Eilberg | Great Britain | Half Moon Delphi | 72.264 | 16 Q | 72.857 | 14 Q | 74.232 | 15 |
| Jose Daniel Martin Dockx | Spain | Grandioso | 72.204 | 17 Q | 71.220 | 22 | | |
| Hans-Peter Minderhoud | Netherlands | Glock's Romanov | 71.353 | 18 Q | 73.244 | 13 | | |
| Marcela Krinke-Susmelj | Switzerland | Smeyers Molberg | 70.125 | 19 Q | 72.039 | 18 | | |
| Claudia Fassaert | Belgium | Donnerfee | 70.897 | 20 Q | 72.292 | 16 Q | 74.786 | 14 |
| Minna Telde | Sweden | Santana | 70.517 | 21 Q | 72.574 | 15 Q | 76.589 | 11 |
| Danielle Heijkoop | Netherlands | Siro | 70.228 | 22 Q | 73.274 | 12 Q | 75.304 | 13 |
| Marc Boblet | France | Noble Dream Concept Sol | 70.015 | 23 Q | 66.890 | 30 | | |
| Gonçalo Carvalho | Portugal | Rubi | 69.362 | 24 Q | 71.935 | 19 | | |
| Cathrine Rasmussen | Norway | Fernandez | 69.319 | 25 Q | 69.256 | 26 | | |
| José Antonio Garcia Mena | Spain | Norte Lovera | 69.164 | 26 Q | 70.179 | 24 | | |
| Lone Bang Larsen | Denmark | Fitou L | 68.875 | 27 Q | 69.985 | 25 | | |
| Jessica Michel | France | Riwera de Hus | 68.875 | 27 Q | 67.619 | 29 | | |
| Henri Ruoste | Finland | Jojo AZ | 68.860 | 29 Q | 67.991 | 28 | | |
| Renate Voglsang | Austria | Fabriano 58 | 68.860 | 29 Q | 69.241 | 27 | | |
| Simon Missiaen | Belgium | Vradin | 68.571 | 31 | | | | |
| Mikaela Lindh | Finland | Skovlunds Mas Guapo | 68.511 | 32 | | | | |
| Andrea John | Austria | Esperanto 4 | 68.389 | 33 | | | | |
| Maria Caetano | Portugal | Xiripiti | 68.313 | 34 | | | | |
| Lillann Jebsen | Norway | Pro-Set | 67.872 | 35 | | | | |
| Veronique Henschen | Luxembourg | Fontalero | 67.720 | 36 | | | | |
| Julie de Deken | Belgium | Lucky Dance | 67.629 | 37 | | | | |
| Claire Gosselin | France | Karamel de Lauture | 66.778 | 38 | | | | |
| Caroline Häcki | Switzerland | Rigoletto Royal CH | 66.657 | 39 | | | | |
| Katarzyna Milczarek | Poland | Ekwador | 66.626 | 40 | | | | |
| Roland Tong | Ireland | Pompidou | 66.611 | 41 | | | | |
| Karen Tebar | France | Florentino 47 | 66.246 | 42 | | | | |
| Hans Staub | Switzerland | Warbeau | 65.790 | 43 | | | | |
| Inna Logutenkova | Ukraine | VIAN Stallone | 65.684 | 44 | | | | |
| Stella Hagelstam | Finland | Soraya II | 65.623 | 45 | | | | |
| Karin Kosak | Austria | Lucy's Day | 65.532 | 46 | | | | |
| Elena Sidneva | Russia | Romeo-Star | 65.532 | 46 | | | | |
| Melanie Hofmann | Switzerland | CB Cazaggo C | 65.471 | 48 | | | | |
| Philippe Jorissen | Belgium | Le Beau | 65.106 | 49 | | | | |
| Filipe Canelas | Portugal | Der Clou | 65.091 | 50 | | | | |
| Emma Kanerva | Finland | Sini Spirit | 65.091 | 50 | | | | |
| Isabelle Constantini | Luxembourg | Rimbeau | 64.757 | 52 | | | | |
| Malin Hamilton | Sweden | Fleetwood | 64.742 | 53 | | | | |
| Luis Principe | Portugal | World Performance Washington | 64.271 | 54 | | | | |
| Svetlana Kiseliova | Ukraine | Parish | 63.830 | 55 | | | | |
| Zaneta Skowronska | Poland | Salmag With You | 63.480 | 56 | | | | |
| Federica Scolari | Italy | Beldonwelt | 62.964 | 57 | | | | |
| Micol Rustignoli | Italy | Corallo Nero | 62.796 | 58 | | | | |
| Gaston Chelius | Luxembourg | Flamenco R | 62.325 | 59 | | | | |
| Tatiana Dorofeeva | Russia | Khorovod | 62.234 | 60 | | | | |
| Diane Erpelding | Luxembourg | Woltair TSF | 62.219 | 61 | | | | |
| Ester Soldi | Italy | Harmonia | 61.900 | 62 | | | | |
| Dane Rawlins | Ireland | Sydney | 61.839 | 63 | | | | |
| Ellen Birgitte Farbrot | Norway | Tailormade Akon Askelund | 61.383 | 64 | | | | |
| Gareth Hughes | Great Britain | Stenjkens Nadonna | 60.866 | 65 | | | | |
