= Soldi (surname) =

Soldi is an Italian surname. Notable people with the surname include:

- Andrea Soldi (1703–1771), Italian portraitist
- Ester Soldi (born 1970), Italian horse rider
- Raúl Soldi (1905–1994), Argentine painter
