= Tatiana Dorofeeva =

Tatiana Dorofeeva may refer to:

- Tatiana Dorofeeva (linguist) (1948–2012), Russian linguist, orientalist and translator
- Tatiana Dorofeeva (equestrian) (born 1965), Russian dressage rider
