= Kristy Oatley =

Australian equestrian (born 1978)

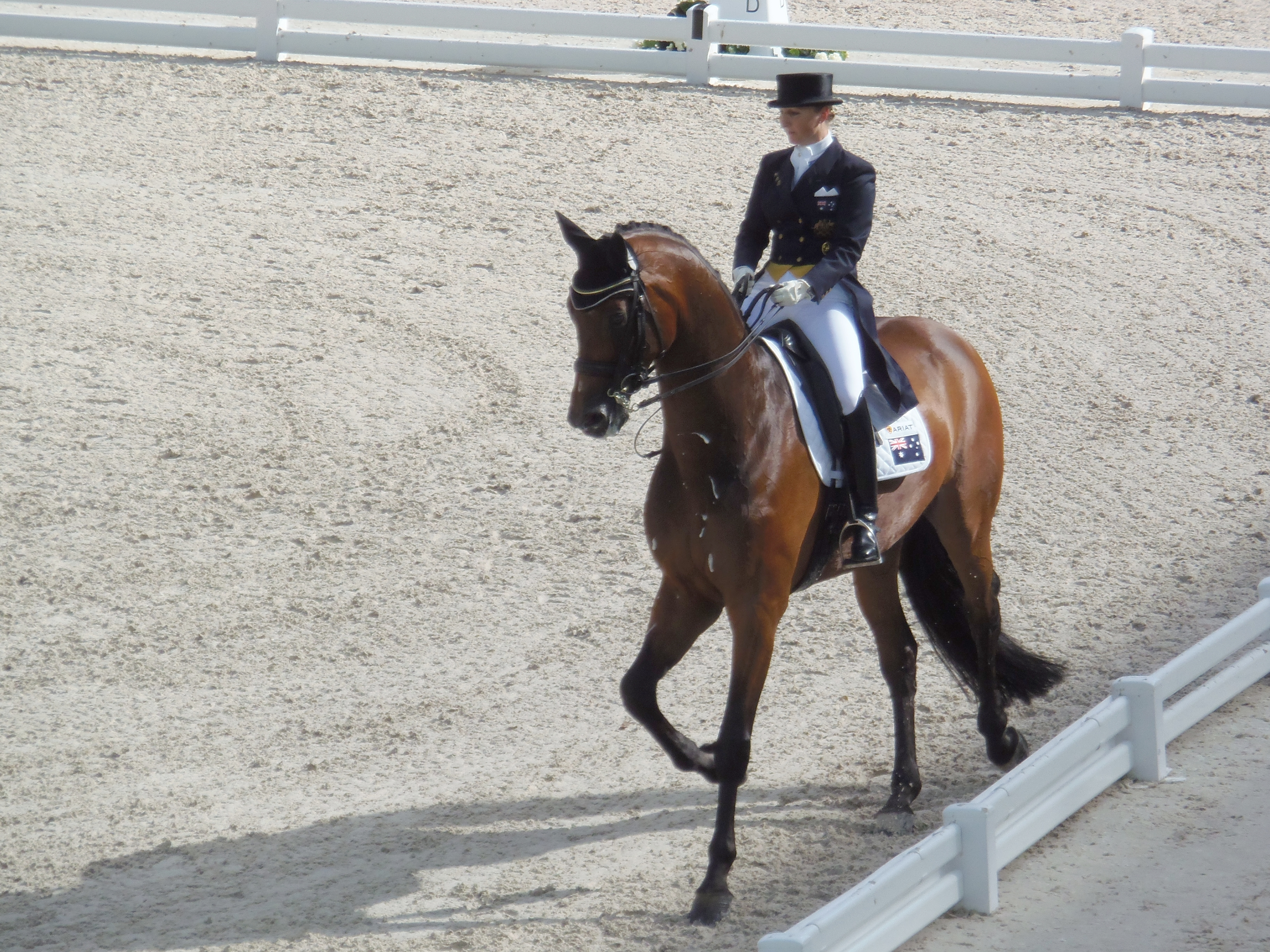
- Kristy Oatley and Ronan (2014 FEI World Equestrian Games)

Personal information
- Nationality: Australian
- Born: 18 July 1978 (age 48) Sydney, Australia
- Height: 170 cm (67 in) (2012)
- Weight: 56 kg (123 lb) (2012)

Sport
- Country: Australia
- Sport: Equestrian
- Event: Dressage
- Club: Trittau Reitverein

Kristy Oatley-Nist (born 18 July 1978) is an Australian equestrian. She represented Australia at the 2000, 2008, 2012 and 2016 Summer Olympics in the equestrian discipline of dressage.

== Personal ==
Oatley was born on 18 July 1978 in Sydney, Australia. She attended St James Primary School in New South Wales before going to high school at Scone Grammar School in New South Wales and St Catherines High School in Victoria. She moved to Germany in 2000. As of June 2012, she lives in Gronwohld, Germany.

She is a granddaughter of wine producer and yachtsman Robert Oatley and a cousin of fellow Australian Olympian Lyndal Oatley.

As of 2012, Oatley was 170 centimetres (67 in) tall and weighed 56 kilograms (123 lb).

== Equestrian ==
Oatley is an equestrian dressage competitor. She has been coached by Sjef Janssen since 2010. Her primary training base is in Hamburg, Germany with a secondary base in Erp, Netherlands. She is a member of Trittau Reitverein in Germany. She represented Germany at the European Young Rider competition in 1995 and 1997, where she claimed the title. She became a member of the Australian national team in 1999.

Oatley competed at the 2000 Summer Olympics where she finished 9th individually and 6th teamwise with Wall Street and at the 2008 Summer Olympics where she finished 7th in the team event with Quando Quando. At the 2008 Wiesbaden, she finished 1st in the Freestyle event. She finished 8th at the 2012 CDI3 Star Grand Prix held in Compiegne, France. She finished 7th at the 2012 CDI3 Star Grand Prix held in Saumur, France. She finished 3rd at the 2012 CDI Grand Prix held in Warsaw, Poland. She finished 5th at the 2012 CDI3 Star held in Stadl Paura, Austria. At the 2012 Compiegne Equestre, Dressage International, France, she finished first in the freestyle event.

Oatley was selected to represent Australia at the 2012 Summer Olympics in equestrian dressage. She will ride her horse, Clive. The Games were her third. Her 2012 selection was subject to scrutiny following allegations by Hayley Beresford, Australia's top ranked female dressage competitor, that there was bias by Equestrian Australia in the team selection process which Beresford charactertised as "blatant bias and double standards." Oatley was not a member of Australia's Shadow Olympic Squad until April 2012, after the initial team was named. During Olympic qualification, she "was granted an exemption from competing in one of the two compulsory nomination events after her horse fell ill." A similar exemption was not granted to another Olympic hopeful. She placed 9th with the Australian team in the team competition and 43rd in the individual competition.

In 2014, Kristy was selected to be a part of Australian team for the 2014 World Equestrian Games. At the Games, which were held in the region of Normandy, France, Kristy finished 86th in the individual competition and 10th in the team competition.

Two years later she competed at her 4th Olympics as she was selected to compete at the 2016 Summer Olympics held in Rio de Janeiro, Brazil. She placed 9th in the team and 42nd in the individual dressage competitions.

In 2017, Oatley participated at the Dressage World Cup Finals. She qualified to compete at the event through the Western European League, marking her first World Cup Finals qualification since 2004. At the Finals held in Omaha, Kristy placed 10th.
