= Pedro Almeida (equestrian) =

Brazilian equestrian (born 1993)

Personal information
- Full name: Pedro Manuel Tavares de Almeida
- Born: 11 December 1993 (age 32) São Paulo, Brazil
- Height: 176 cm (5 ft 9 in)
- Weight: 78 kg (172 lb)

Sport
- Sport: Equestrian
- Event: Dressage
Medal record
Equestrian
Representing Brazil
Pan American Games
Bronze medal – third place	2019 Lima	Team dressage

Pedro Manuel Tavares de Almeida (born 11 December 1993) is a Brazilian Olympic dressage rider. He participated at his home Olympics in Rio de Janeiro in 2016, where he placed 10th in the team and 53rd in the individual competition.

He also competed at the 2014 World Equestrian Games in Normandy, France, where he finished 24th with the Brazilian team in the team competition and 91st in the individual dressage competition.

His twin brother Manuel and sister Luiza have also been competing internationally for Brazil in dressage.
