= Lyndal Oatley =

Australian equestrian

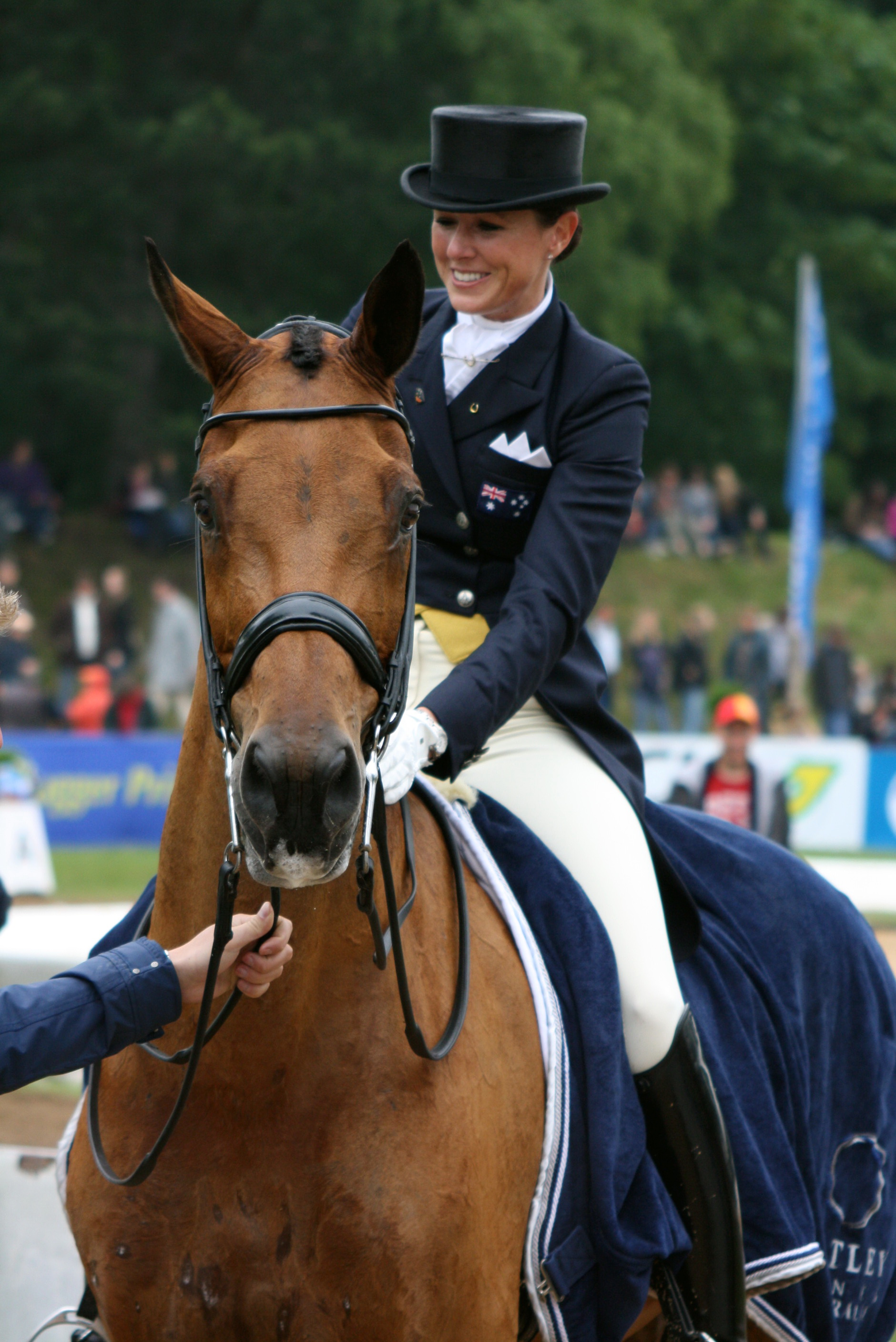
- Lyndal Oatley (2011)

Personal information
- Nationality: Australian
- Born: Lyndal Oatley; 27 June 1980 (age 46) Sydney, Australia
- Height: 176 cm (69 in) (2012)
- Weight: 61 kg (134 lb) (2012)
- Spouse: Patrik Kittel

Sport
- Country: Australia
- Sport: Equestrian
- Event: Dressage
- Club: Dressage NSW

Lyndal Oatley (born 27 June 1980) is an Australian equestrian. She represented Australia at two Summer Olympics in equestrian dressage (in 2012 and 2016).

== Personal ==
Oatley was born on 27 June 1980 in Sydney, Australia. She attended Denman Public School before going to high school at Scone Grammar School. From 2000 to 2006, she attended Charles Sturt University where she earned a Bachelor of Business in Marketing and Business Management. As of June 2012, she lived in Nottuln, Germany; and is married to Swedish equestrian Patrik Kittel.

Her grandfather was Robert Oatley. In the Super-Maxi Wild Oats XI, he won the Sydney to Hobart Yacht Race five times. Her cousin is fellow Olympian Kirsty Oatley.

As of 2012, Oatley was 176 centimetres (69 in) tall and weighed 61 kilograms (134 lb).

== Equestrian ==
Oatley is an equestrian dressage competitor. She has been coached by Patrik Kittel since 2008. Her primary training base is in Nottuln, Germany. She is a member of Dressage NSW.

In 2010, as a member of Team Australia, Oatley finished eighth at the World Equestrian Games. She finished 31st at the 2011 Aachen CDIO5 GP held in Aachen, Germany. She finished 13th at the 2011 München-Riem CDI3 GP held in Munich, Germany. She finished 15th at the 2011 Lingen CDI4 GP held in Lingen, Germany.

Oatley finished 4th at the 2012 CDI3 Grand Prix held in Compiegne, France. She finished 7th at the 2012 CDI3 Grand Prix held in Mannheim, Germany. She finished 4th at the 2012 CDI-W Grand Prix Special held in Wroclaw, Poland. She finished 14th at the 2012 CDI-W Grand Prix held in Wroclaw, Poland. At the 2012 Compiegne Equestre, Dressage International, France, she finished third in the freestyle event. In 2012, she was named the Australian Equestrian Athlete of the Year.

Oatley was selected to represent Australia at the 2012 Summer Olympics in equestrian dressage. They were her debut Games. She rode Sandro Boy. Her 2012 selection was subject to scrutiny following allegations by Hayley Beresford, Australia's top ranked female dressage competitor, that there was bias by Equestrian Australia in the team selection process which Beresford charactertised as "blatant bias and double standards." She placed 9th with the Australian team in the team competition and 37th in the individual competition.

In 2014, Oatley was selected to be a part of Australian team for the 2014 World Equestrian Games. At the Games, which were held in the region of Normandy, France, Lyndal finished 32nd in the individual competition and 10th in the team competition.

Oatley qualified for the 2016 edition of the Dressage World Cup finals held in Gothenburg, Sweden. She finished 11th in the field of 18 top class competitors. Later that year she competed at the 2016 Summer Olympics held in Rio de Janeiro, Brazil. She placed 9th in the team and 37th in the individual dressage competitions.
