= Megan Lane =

Canadian dressage rider (born 1991)

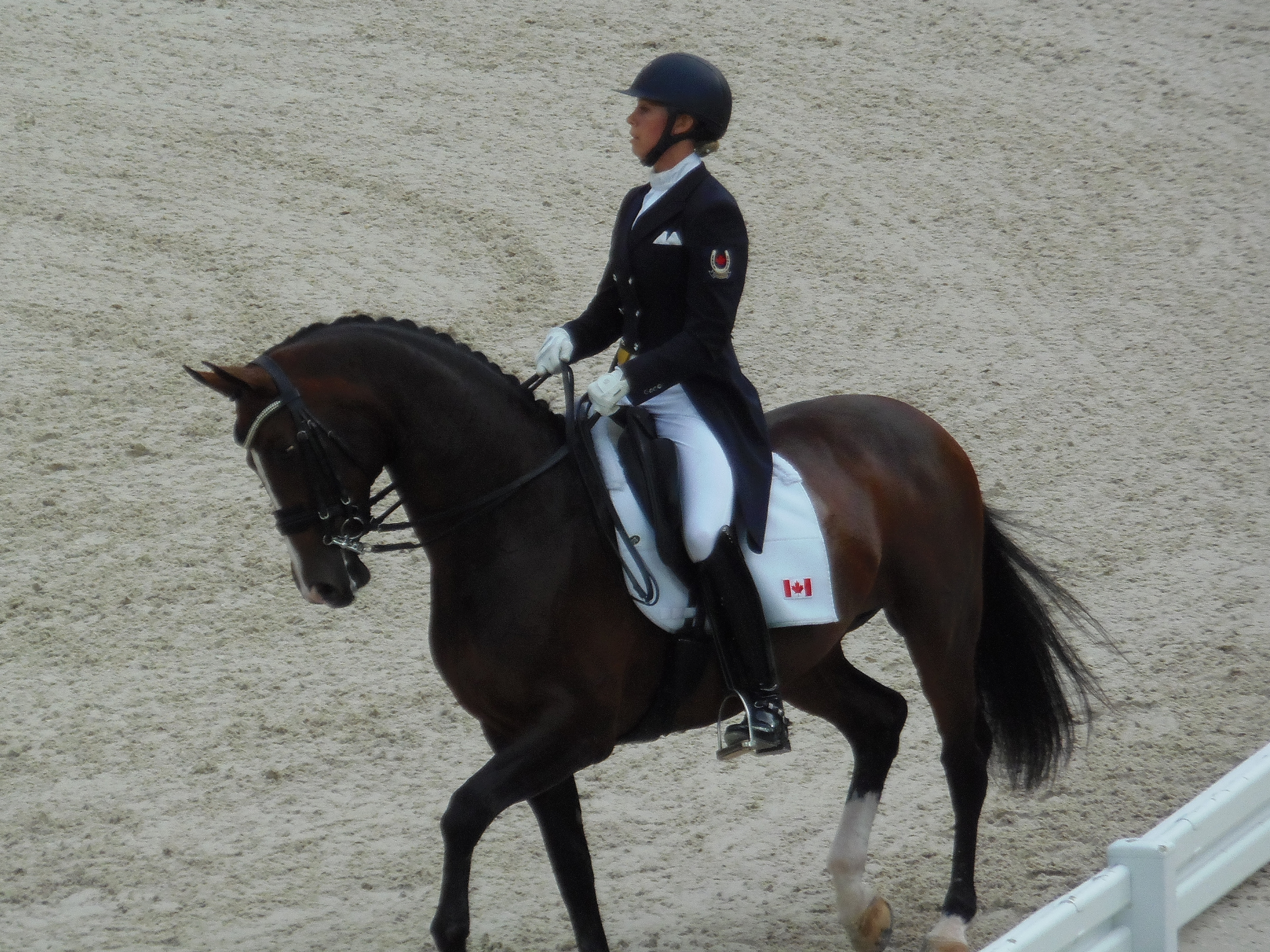
- Megan Lane and Caravella (2014 FEI World Equestrian Games)

Personal information
- Born: July 4, 1991 (age 35) Collingwood, Ontario, Canada

Sport
- Sport: Equestrian
- Event: Dressage
Medal record
Equestrian
Representing Canada
Pan American Games
Silver medal – second place	2015 Toronto	Team dressage

Megan Lane (born 4 July 1991) is a Canadian Olympic dressage rider. She participated at two World Equestrian Games (in 2014 and 2018). Her best results were achieved during the 2014 edition, when she placed 9th with the Canadian team in the team competition, and 37th in the individual competition aboard Caravella.

Lane is a multiple medalist from the North American junior and young riders' dressage championships. She was also named the Dressage Canada Owner of the year in 2014 due to her successes over the years with her own Dutch Warmblood mare Caravella.

In July 2016, she was named to Canada's Olympic team. At the Olympics held in Rio de Janeiro, Brazil, Lane placed 32nd in the individual dressage.

== Notable Horses ==
- Dolany
  - 2008 North American Junior Championships - Individual 15th Place, Individual 11th Place Freestyle
- Caravella - 2001 Bay Dutch Warmblood Mare (Contango)
  - 2009 North American Junior Championships - Individual Bronze Medal, Individual Silver Medal Freestyle
  - 2010 North American Young Rider Championships - Individual Silver Medal, Individual Bronze Medal Freestyle
  - 2011 North American Young Rider Championships - Individual 4th Place, Individual 13th Place Freestyle
  - 2014 World Equestrian Games - Team 9th Place, Individual 37th Place
  - 2015 Pan American Games - Team Silver Medal, Individual 22nd Place
  - 2016 Rio Olympics - Individual 33rd Place
- Lucky Lemon - 2004 Bay Hannoverian Gelding (Lemon Park x Bergkristall)
  - 2012 North American Young Rider Championships - Team Fourth Place, Individual 11th Place, Individual 9th Place Freestyle
- Zodiac MW - 2004 Bay Dutch Warmblood Gelding (Rousseau x Amethist)
  - 2018 World Equestrian Games - Team 11th Place, Individual 75th Place
