= Bob Oatley =

Australian businessman, winemaker and yachtsman

Bob Oatley AO, BEM
- Born: Robert Ian Oatley; 11 June 1928; Mosman, New South Wales, Australia
- Died: 10 January 2016 (aged 87); Pittwater, New South Wales, Australia
- Occupations: Businessman; winemaker; yachtsman
- Known for: Wild Oats XI; Rosemount winery
- Spouses: Rosemary Nell Bray (m. 1951; div. 1982); Valerie
- Children: 3
- Relatives: Kristy Oatley, Lyndal Oatley (granddaughters)
- Website: Official website

Robert Ian Oatley AO, BEM (11 June 1928 – 10 January 2016) was an Australian businessman, winemaker, yachtsman and philanthropist. He was perhaps best known for owning the nine-time Sydney-Hobart-winning yacht Wild Oats XI. He bought Hamilton Island, Queensland in 2003 for $200 million, he also owned retirement homes and a villa in Sardinia, Italy. Oatley also established the Rosemount winery, in the Hunter Valley in 1969.

== Biography ==
Robert Oatley was born in the Sydney suburb of Mosman in 1928, the son of Geoffrey Oatley and Isabel "Jean" née Brown. Oatley was a great, great grandson of British clock maker James Oatley. and a great grandson of James Oatley, Lord Mayor of Sydney and a Member of the Legislative Assembly of New South Wales.

Oatley's mother, Jean, died from melanoma 13 months after his birth, leaving him as an only child. Oatley's father was employed in the wool industry, which meant spending much of his working life was spent travelling in rural New South Wales. Consequently, Oatley was raised by his mother's sister, Muriel, the wife of Duncan A. Cameron. Oatley attended the Mosman Primary School.

Oatley's first employment, in about 1943 and still wartime, was by the firm, Colyer Watson, owned by Rupert Alexander Colyer. His tasks included delivering letters by hand to other local businesses and to fill the company's inkwells. Later, as Bob gained expertise and business acumen, he accompanied his employer on business trips. The Colyer Watson firm also owned a coffee division on Papua New Guinea; a division which owed money to the parent company. The task of recovering the money was handed over to the increasingly competent business employee, Robert Oatley. Oatley started out as a businessman in the 1950s trading coffee and cocoa beans from Papua New Guinea.

In his early 40s Bob bought this Papuan Division of the Colyer company from his employer and changed its name to Angco. Oatley then expanded his company both in Papua and by establishing trade with northern hemisphere countries, an enterprise which earned him a British Empire Medal about fifteen years later, in 1985. Soon afterwards he sold the last of his Papuan businesses. After Papua gained independence in the mid-1970s Oatley had begun to sell off his business holdings there.

Oatley had also established his successful Rosemount winery, in the Hunter Valley, started in 1968. Actually, the name was not original for the district. The original Rosemount winery was established in the same area, near Denman, during the 1860s. Oatley's Rosemount winery was sold in 2001. By this time Oatley and his family had established other wineries, including, in the early 1990s, another winery, near Mudgee, with the company name Oatley Wines and label Wild Oats.

He died from a lung infection on 10 January 2016, aged 87.

== Personal life ==
Oatley married Rosemary Nell Bray on 12 April 1951 in St Clement's Church, Mosman; and divorced on 2 December 1982, about seven weeks before Rosemary died. They had three children, Andrew "Sandy", Ian, and Rosalind. Two of Oatley's grandchildren, cousins Kristy Oatley and Lyndal Oatley, are Olympic equestrians. Oatley later married Valerie.

== Honours ==
Oatley was awarded the British Empire Medal in 1984, for his service to the coffee industry in Papua New Guinea. In 2014, Oatley was appointed an Officer of the Order of Australia.
