= Manuel Almeida (equestrian) =

Brazilian equestrian (born 1993)

Personal information
- Full name: Manuel Rodrigues Tavares de Almeida Neto
- Born: 11 December 1993 (age 32)
Medal record
Equestrian
Representing Brazil
Pan American Games
Silver medal – second place	2023 Santiago	Team dressage

Manuel Rodrigues Tavares de Almeida Neto (born 11 December 1993) is a Brazilian dressage rider. He competed at the 2014 World Equestrian Games in Normandy where she finished 24th with the Brazilian team in the team competition and 87th in the individual dressage competition.

His twin brother Pedro and sister Luiza have also been competing internationally for Brazil in dressage.
