= Alexandre Ayache =

French dressage rider

Personal information
- Nationality: France
- Discipline: Dressage
- Born: 20 September 1982 (age 44); Nice, France
- Home town: Lantosque, France

Alexandre Ayache (born 20 September 1982 in Nice) is a French dressage rider. He represented France at the 2014 World Equestrian Games in Normandy where he finished 11th in team dressage and 62nd in the individual dressage competition.

Ayache was the traveling reserve for the French Olympic team during the 2016 Olympic Games in Rio de Janeiro. In 2021 he represented the French team at the 2020 Olympic Games in Tokyo, finishing 34th with his horse Zo What in the individual competition and 9th with the team.

He is married to Estonian dressage rider Grete Püvi and together they have two daughters.
