= Grete Püvi =

Estonian dressage rider

Grete Ayache
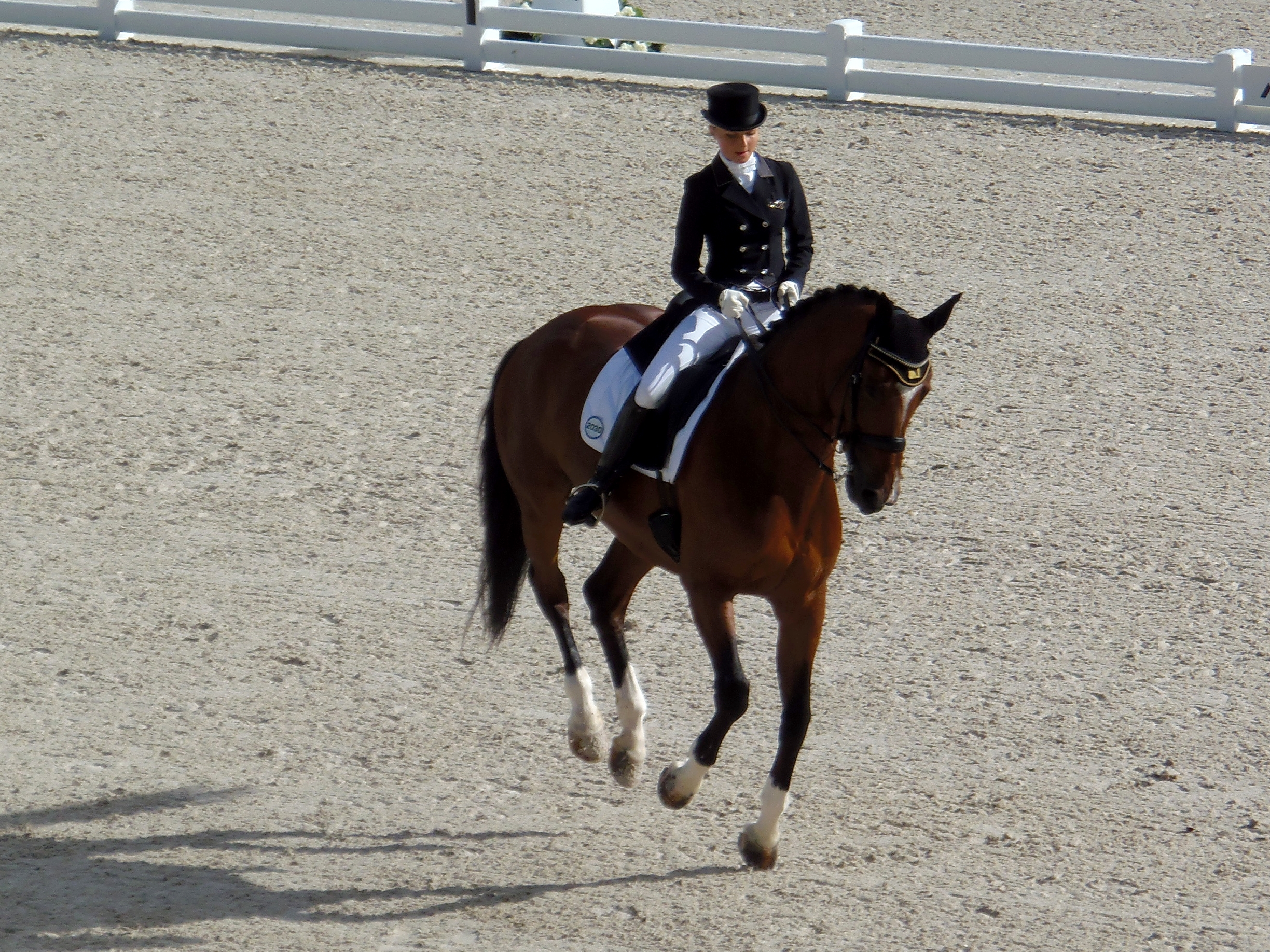
- Grete Püvi and Talent (2014 FEI World Equestrian Games)

Personal information
- Nickname: Coco
- Born: Grete Püvi; 12 March 1982 (age 44) Tallinn, then part of Estonian SSR, Soviet Union

Sport
- Country: Estonia
- Sport: Equestrian

Achievements and titles
- World finals: 2014 FEI World Equestrian Games

Grete Ayache (born 12 March 1982 in Tallinn), born as Grete Püvi, is an Estonian dressage rider. Representing Estonia, she competed at the 2014 World Equestrian Games and at the 2011 European Dressage Championship. She placed 61st place in individual dressage at the 2011 Europeans held in Rotterdam.

She retired her Grand Prix horse, Talent, from the competition in 2016. The horse had been previously ridden by Bernard Bosseaux.

In 2017 she won 3rd place in the FEI World Cup Dressage Central European League Freestyle competition.

== Personal ==
Püvi started riding at the age of 12. She made her international debut in 2005 during the CDI in Warka, Poland. She is married to the reserve rider for the French Olympic team in 2016; Alexandre Ayache and together they have a daughter. She lives in Nice, France.

Her sister Pirjo Püvi is an opera singer and her uncle is Leo Näppinen, an Estonian scientist. Grete is fluent in Estonian, French, English, German, Finnish and Russian.

== Personal bests ==
Personal bests as of April 2015
Event	Score	Horse	Venue	Date
Grand Prix	70.220	Talent	Nice, France	April 4, 2015
Grand Prix Special	70.313	Aleandro	Brno, Czech Republic	June 17, 2017
Grand Prix Freestyle	73.850	Talent	Lipica, Slovenia	May 24, 2015
