= Borja Carrascosa =

Spanish dressage rider

Personal information
- Born: 5 February 1982 (age 43); Madrid, Spain

Borja Carrascosa (born 5 February 1982, in Madrid, Spain) is a Spanish dressage rider. He represented Spain at the 2014 World Equestrian Games in Normandy, France where he finished 5th in team dressage and 71st in the individual dressage competition.

He competed at the 2024 Olympic Games in Paris, France where he finished 28th in the Grand Prix and 13th with the Spanish team.
