= Joanne Vaughan =

British-born Georgian dressage rider

Personal information
- Born: 30 April 1961 (age 65)

Joanne Vaughan (born 30 April 1961) is a British-born Georgian dressage rider. She represented Georgia at the 2014 World Equestrian Games in Normandy where she retired during the Grand Prix, the first phase of the individual dressage competition. By doing so, she became the first Georgian athlete to compete at the World Equestrian Games.
