= Michael Eilberg =

British dressage rider (born 1986)

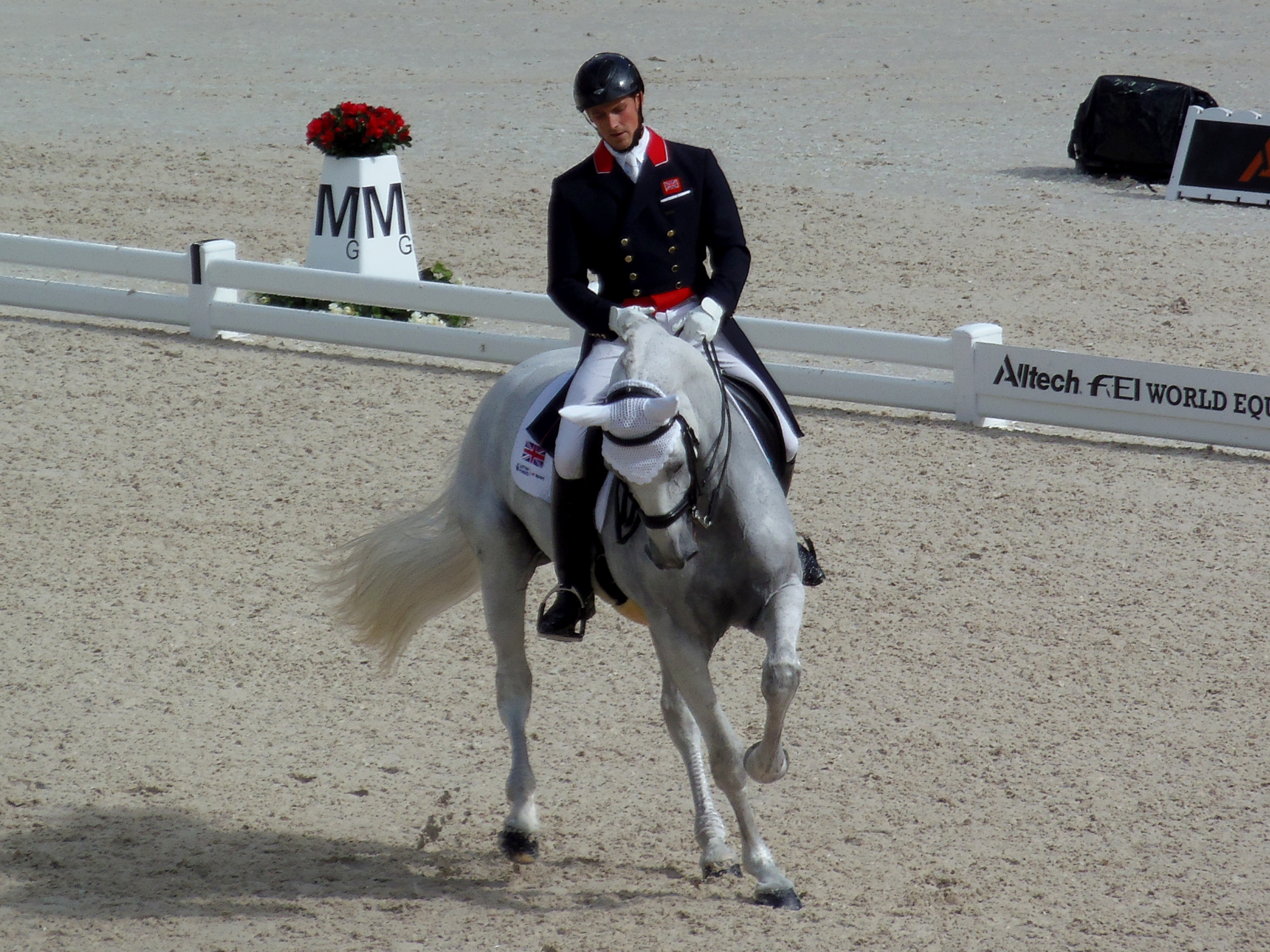
- Michael Eilberg and Half Moon Delphi (2014 FEI World Equestrian Games)

Personal information
- Born: 6 October 1986 (age 39)
Medal record
Equestrian
Representing Great Britain
World Championships
Silver medal – second place	2014 Normandy	Team dressage
European Championships
Silver medal – second place	2015 Aachen	Team dressage
Bronze medal – third place	2013 Herning	Team dressage

Michael George Eilberg (born 6 October 1986) is a British dressage rider. Representing Great Britain, he competed at the 2014 World Equestrian Games and at two European Dressage Championships (in 2013 and 2015).

Altogether, Eilberg has won three team medals at various championships (one silver and two bronze). Meanwhile, his best individual championship result is 8th place in Grand Prix Freestyle at the 2014 World Equestrian Games.
