= Christian Schumach =

Austrian dressage rider (born 1981)

Personal information
- Nickname: Chris
- Nationality: Austrian
- Born: Christian Schumach; 17 September 1981 (age 44); Murau, Austria

Sport
- Country: Austria
- Sport: Dressage
- Team: Team Gut Muraunberg

Achievements and titles
- Olympic finals: 2020 Summer Olympics
- World finals: 2014 World Equestrian Games

Christian Schumach (born 17 September 1981 in Murau) is an Austrian dressage rider. He represented Austria at the 2014 World Equestrian Games in Normandy, France, where he finished 8th in team dressage and 64th in the individual dressage competition. He also represented Austria at the 2017 FEI European Dressage Championships.

In 2021, he was selected by the Austrian Equestrian Federation (OEPS) to represent Austria at the Olympic Games in Tokyo, he finished 21st in individual dressage. He was initially also selected for the Austrian team for the 2024 Summer Olympics in Paris but his horse Te Quiro was not fit so he was replaced by first reserve Stefan Lehfellner.
