= Anna Łukasik =

Polish dressage rider

Personal information
- Born: 27 July 1987 (age 37); Lublin, Poland

Anna Łukasik (born 27 July 1987 in Lublin, Poland) is a Polish dressage rider. She represented Poland at the 2014 World Equestrian Games in Normandy, France where she finished 17th in team dressage and 58th in the individual dressage competition.
