= Nicole Smith =

South African dressage rider

Personal information
- Born: October 8, 1991 (age 34)

Nicole Smith (born 8 October 1991) is a South African dressage rider. She competed at the 2014 World Equestrian Games in Normandy where she finished 20th with the South African team in the team competition and 48th in the individual dressage competition.

Her father first put her on a horse at age six months. She rode in junior competitions through childhood and began competing the senior division at age 15.

== Achievements ==
Winner of Galencia SA Dressage Derby 2014
Winner of Roseberry Stables Trophy for Young riders 2008+2007+2010+2011
Winner of Principal Stud Young Riders Cup for Dressage 2008+2009+2010+2011
10th overall in FEI World Dressage Challenge 2009
Winner of Intermediate 1 at 2010 Nissan Easter Festival
Winner of Medium and Intermediate 1 Freestyles at 2010 Musical Kur Festival
Gauteng Adult Intermediate 1 Dressage+ Freestyle Champion 2010
19th in Hungary Grand Prix with 63.4% 2011
19th in France Grand Prix with 62.9% 2011
6th overall in Regional Olympic Team Qualifier with 64.4% 2011
9th in Germany Grand Prix Special with 67.91% 2012
4th in Portugal Grand Prix Special with 66.816% 2012
1st in France Intermediate II with 67.816% 2012
Winner of Intermediate II Gauteng Championship 2012
