= Tanya Seymour =

South African dressage rider

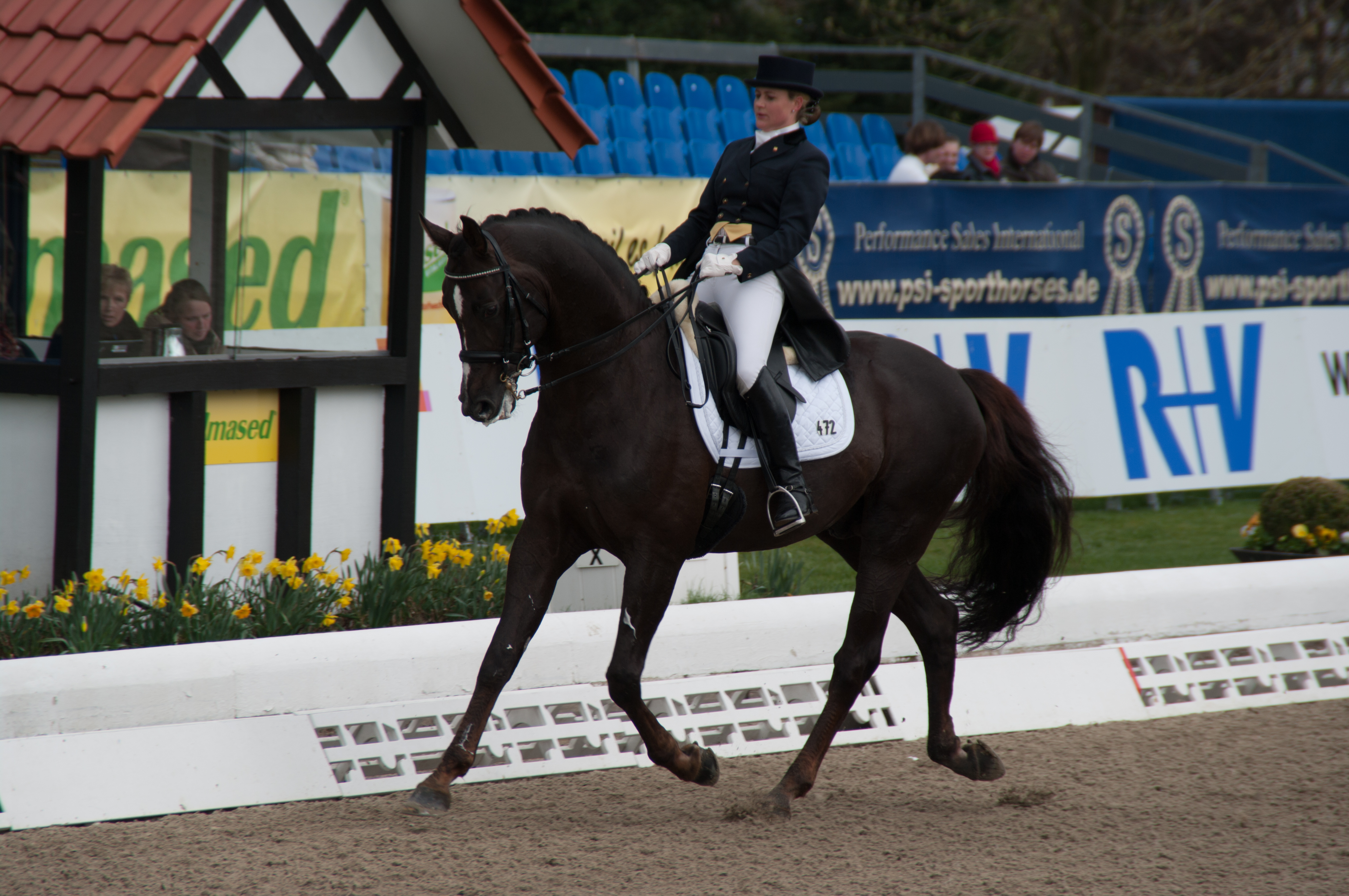
- Tanya Seymour riding Ramoneur (2013)

Personal information
- Full name: Tanya Karen Seymour
- Nationality: South African, Australian
- Born: 5 November 1983 (age 42) Port Elizabeth, South Africa
- Height: 1.65 m (5 ft 5 in)
- Weight: 57 kg (126 lb)

Sport
- Country: South Africa
- Sport: Equestrian
- Coached by: Johnny Hilberath

Achievements and titles
- Olympic finals: Rio de Janeiro 2016; Tokyo 2020
- World finals: 2014 World Equestrian Games; 2019 World Cup Final

Tanya Karen Seymour (born 5 November 1983 in Port Elizabeth, South Africa) is a South African dressage rider. She competed at the 2014 World Equestrian Games in Normandy, where she placed 20th with the South African team in the team competition and 98th in the individual dressage competition.

She was born in South Africa but moved to Australia with her family in 2000. She has been based in Germany since 2007, where she is coached by Jonny Hilberath. She believes that riding should be light and harmonious, with the horse always happy and willing to perform. She credits her support team with maintaining her horses in the highest standard of care possible to ensure they can perform to their best ability.

She earned an individual dressage 2016 Summer Olympics quota place for South Africa after finishing 4th at the Olympic qualification event held in Perl, Germany. She finished in 56th place at the 2016 Summer Olympics, becoming the first ever South African dressage rider to compete at the Olympics.

In 2019, she competed as the first South African rider at the World Cup finals in Goteborg, Sweden. In October later that year, she qualified for the Tokyo Olympics with the South African team during a special Olympic qualifier event in Exloo, Netherlands. Due the postponement of the Olympic Games some of the South African team members fell out and South Africa could not fulfils the Olympic criteria to compete. Seymour was nominated to represent South Africa for the second time as individual with her horse Ramoneur, but had to withdraw one day before the vet-check due a minor injury of her horse after arriving in Tokyo.

== Dressage results ==
=== Olympic Games ===
Event	Individual	Freestyle	Horse
(Brazil) 2016 Rio de Janeiro	56th	—	Ramoneur
(Japan) 2020 Tokyo	WD	—	Ramoneur

=== World Championships ===
Event	Individual	Freestyle	Horse
(France) 2014 Caen	98th	—	Ramoneur

=== World Cup ===
==== Final ====
Event	Score	Rank	Horse
(Sweden) 2019 Gothenburg	65.165	18th	Ramoneur
