= Denise Hallion =

South African dressage rider

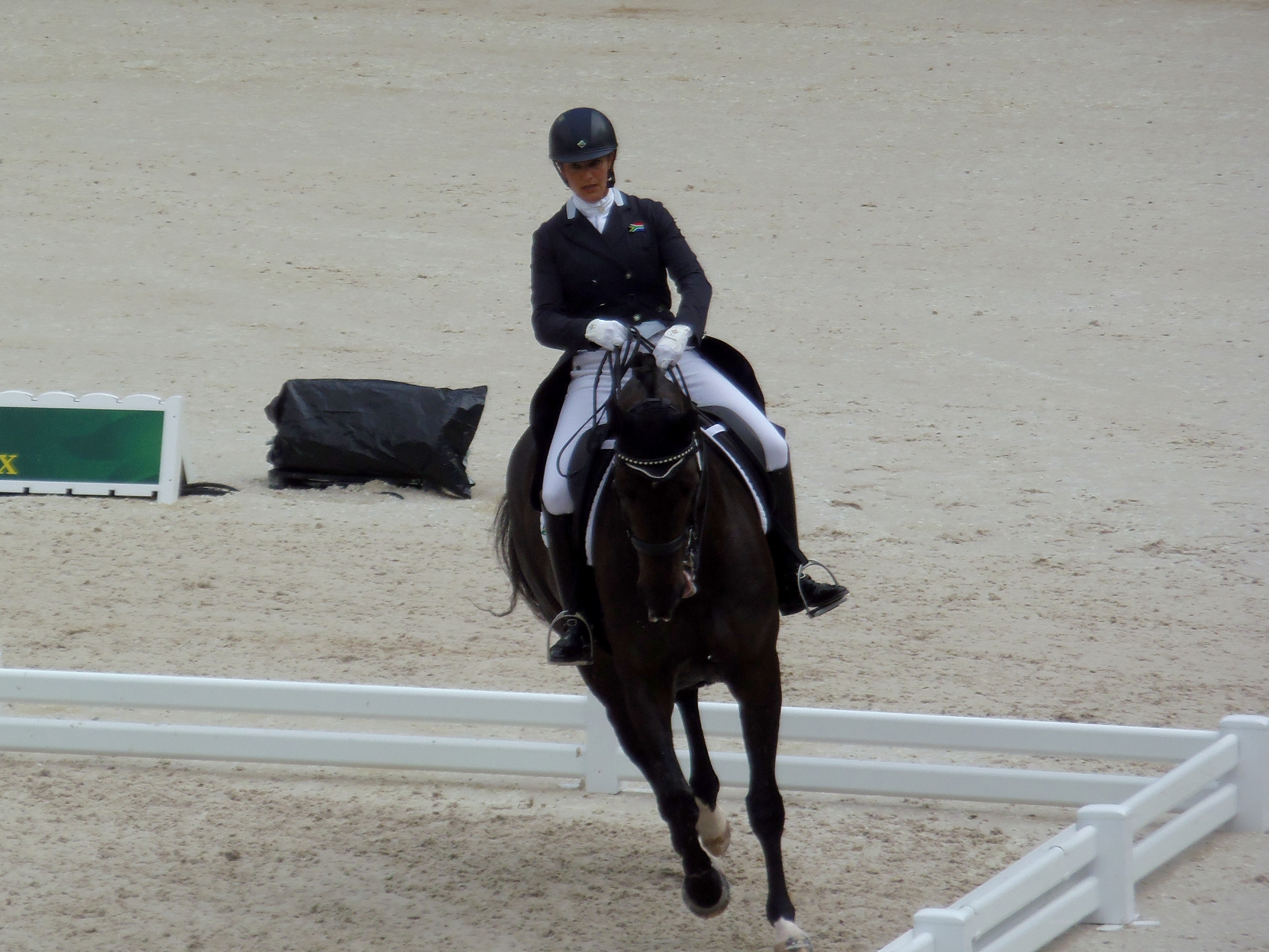
- Denise Hallion and Wervelwind (2014 FEI World Equestrian Games)

Personal information
- Born: May 15, 1966 (age 60)

Denise Hallion (born 15 May 1966) is a South African dressage rider. She competed at the 2014 World Equestrian Games in Normandy where she finished 20th with the South African team in the team competition and 93rd in the individual dressage competition.
