= Marina Aframeeva =

Russian Olympic dressage rider (born 1991)

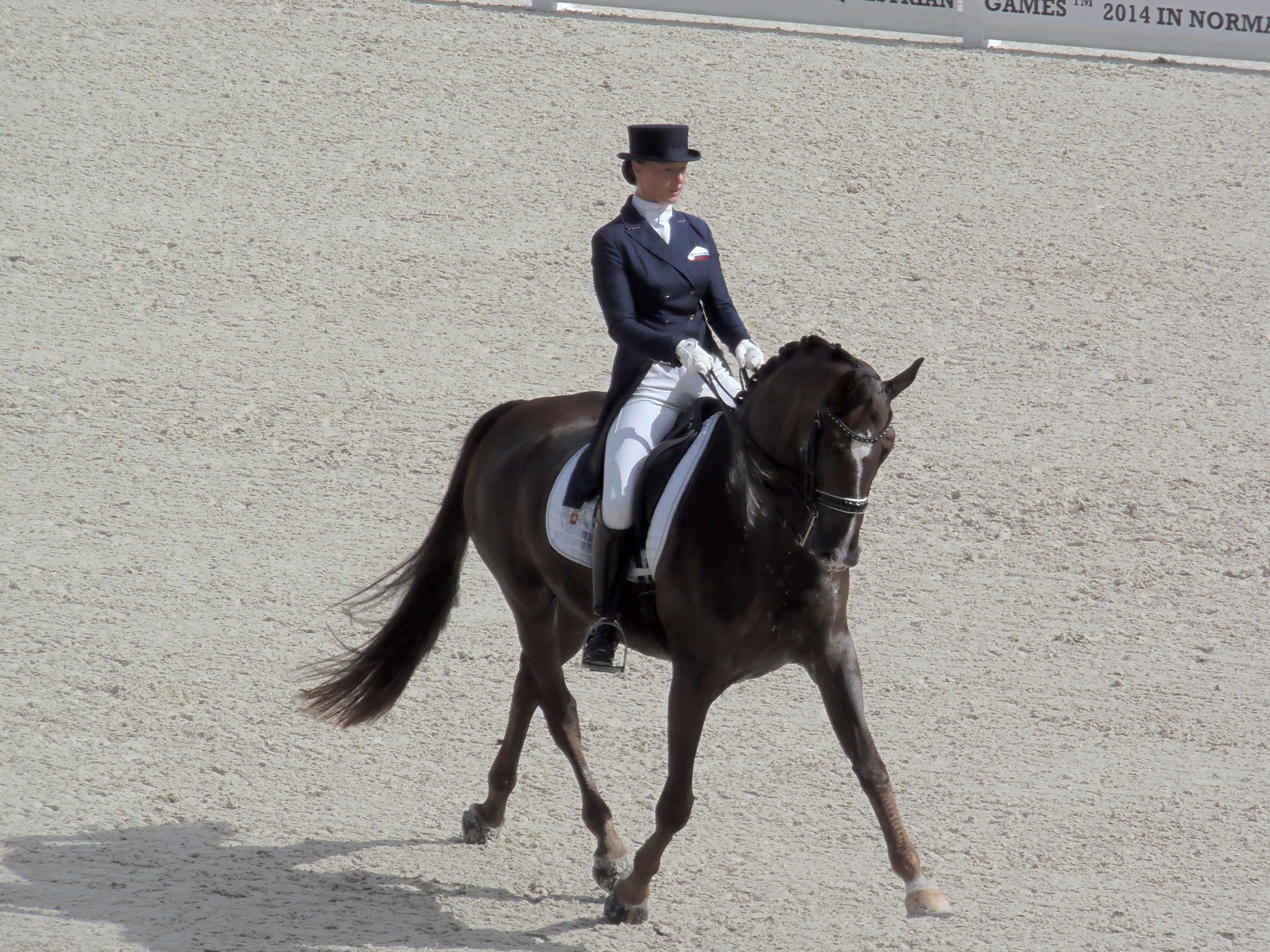
- Marina Aframeeva and Vosk (2014 World Equestrian Games)

Personal information
- Born: 4 March 1991 (age 35) Moscow, Russia

Marina Anatolievna Aframeeva (born 4 March 1991 in Moscow, Russia) is a Russian Olympic dressage rider. She represented Russia at the 2016 Summer Olympics in Rio de Janeiro, Brazil, where she on a horse named Vosk placed 32nd in the individual competition.

Aframeeva also competed at the 2014 World Equestrian Games and at the 2015 European Championships. She finished 7th in team dressage at the 2015 Europeans in Aachen, Germany.

Her aunt Inessa Merkulova also competed at the 2016 Olympics. Marina Aframeeva was named "Best Dressage Rider of 2017" by an equine magazine L’Année Hippique.
