= Chere Burger =

South African dressage rider

Personal information
- Born: June 11, 1982 (age 43); Johannesburg, South Africa

Chere Burger (born 11 June 1982) is a South African dressage rider. She competed at the 2014 World Equestrian Games in Normandy where she finished 20th with the South African team in the team competition and 82nd in the individual dressage competition.
