= Mikala Münter =

Danish dressage rider

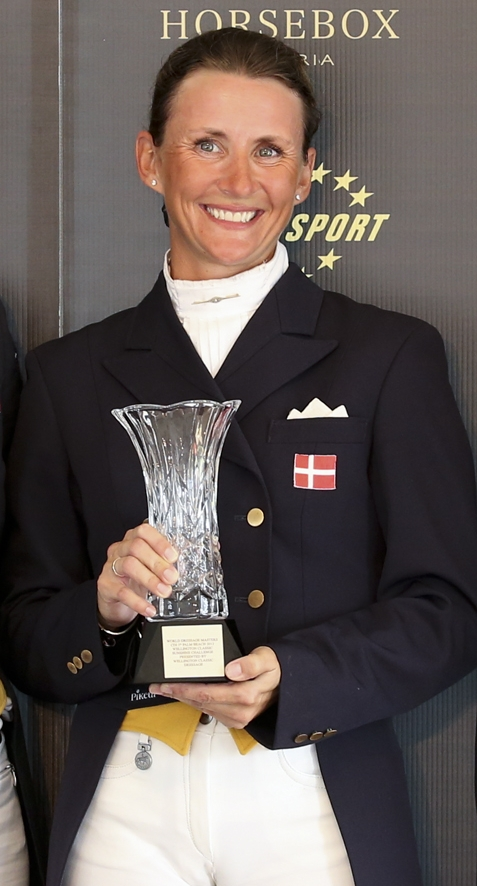

Personal information
- Born: September 26, 1968 (age 57)

Sport
- Sport: Equestrian
- Event: Dressage

Mikala Münter (formerly Mikala Münter Gundersen; born 26 September 1968) is a Danish-born dressage rider, who has been competing internationally for the United States since 2019. She represented Denmark at the 2014 World Equestrian Games, where she placed 7th with the Danish team in the team dressage competition.

She has also qualified for the 2014 Dressage World Cup Final in Lyon, France, by virtue of finishing 2nd in the North American League. She became eligible to compete at the World Cup Final after her fellow Danish rider, Anna Kasprzak, withdrew. At the World Cup Final held in Lyon's Euroexpo, Mikala finished 11th aboard My Lady.

In April 2015, Gundersen qualified for another World Cup finals in Las Vegas, Nevada, which were held from the 15–19 April. She came in 12th place in the Grand Prix due to an "expensive mistake". Despite that, Gundersen rode an excellent Grand Prix Freestyle, holding the leading score until the half-time break. She ended the evening with a 9th place ribbon with a score of 75.018, right behind the Spanish rider, Morgan Barbançon, who rode the famous stallion, Painted Black.

Later that year, Mikala competed at the 2015 European Dressage Championships in Aachen, Germany, where she placed 8th in the team and 27th in the individual competition.

She is currently based in Wellington, Florida.
