= Eevamaria Porthan-Broddell =

Finnish equestrian

Personal information
- Born: December 17, 1978 (age 47) Helsinki, Finland

Eevamaria Porthan-Broddell (born 16 December 1978 in Helsinki, Finland) is a Finnish dressage rider. Representing Finland, she competed at the 2014 World Equestrian Games and at two European Dressage Championships (in 2001 and 2015).

Her current best championship result is 13th place in team dressage at the 2015 European Dressage Championships in Aachen while her current best individual championship result is 42nd place from the 2001 Europeans held in Verden.
