= Manuel Veiga (rider) =

Portuguese dressage rider

Personal information
- Born: March 7, 1986 (age 40) Golegã, Portugal

Manuel Veiga (born 7 March 1986 in Golegã, Portugal) is a Portuguese dressage rider. He took part at two World Equestrian Games (in 2014 and 2018). On both occasions he campaigned with Lusitano Ben Hur da Broa. His best results were achieved in 2018, when he placed 12th in the team and 67th in the individual dressage competition.

He is part of the Veiga farming and horse breeding family that has been active since the early 1800s in Portugal.
