= Karen Pavicic =

Canadian dressage rider

Personal information
- Born: April 29, 1971 (age 55) Vancouver, British Columbia, Canada
Medal record
Equestrian
Representing Croatia
Balkan Championships
Gold medal – first place	2022 Baicol	Individual dressage
Gold medal – first place	2022 Baicol	Freestyle dressage
Representing Canada
Pan American Games
Silver medal – second place	2007 Rio de Janeiro	Team dressage

Karen Pavicic (born April 29, 1971) is a Canadian-born Croatian dressage rider. She represented Canada at the 2014 World Equestrian Games, where she placed 9th in the team competition and 41st in the individual dressage competition onboard Don Daiquiri.

Pavicic won a silver medal in team dressage at the 2007 Pan American Games in Rio de Janeiro, Brazil.

In 2018, Pavicic switched her sports allegiance to Croatia after obtaining dual citizenship. Pavicic made her championships debut for Croatia at the 2022 Balkan Championships in Romania, where she topped each class in the senior division.
