= James Connor (equestrian) =

Irish dressage rider

Personal information
- Born: 25 June 1959 (age 67) Dublin, Ireland

James Connor (born 25 June 1959 in Dublin, Ireland) is an Irish dressage rider. Representing Ireland, he competed at two World Equestrian Games (in 1998 and 2014) and at the 2001 European Dressage Championships.

His current best championship results are 8th place in team dressage and 41st place in individual dressage from the 2001 European Championships.
