= Trude Hestengen =

Norwegian dressage rider

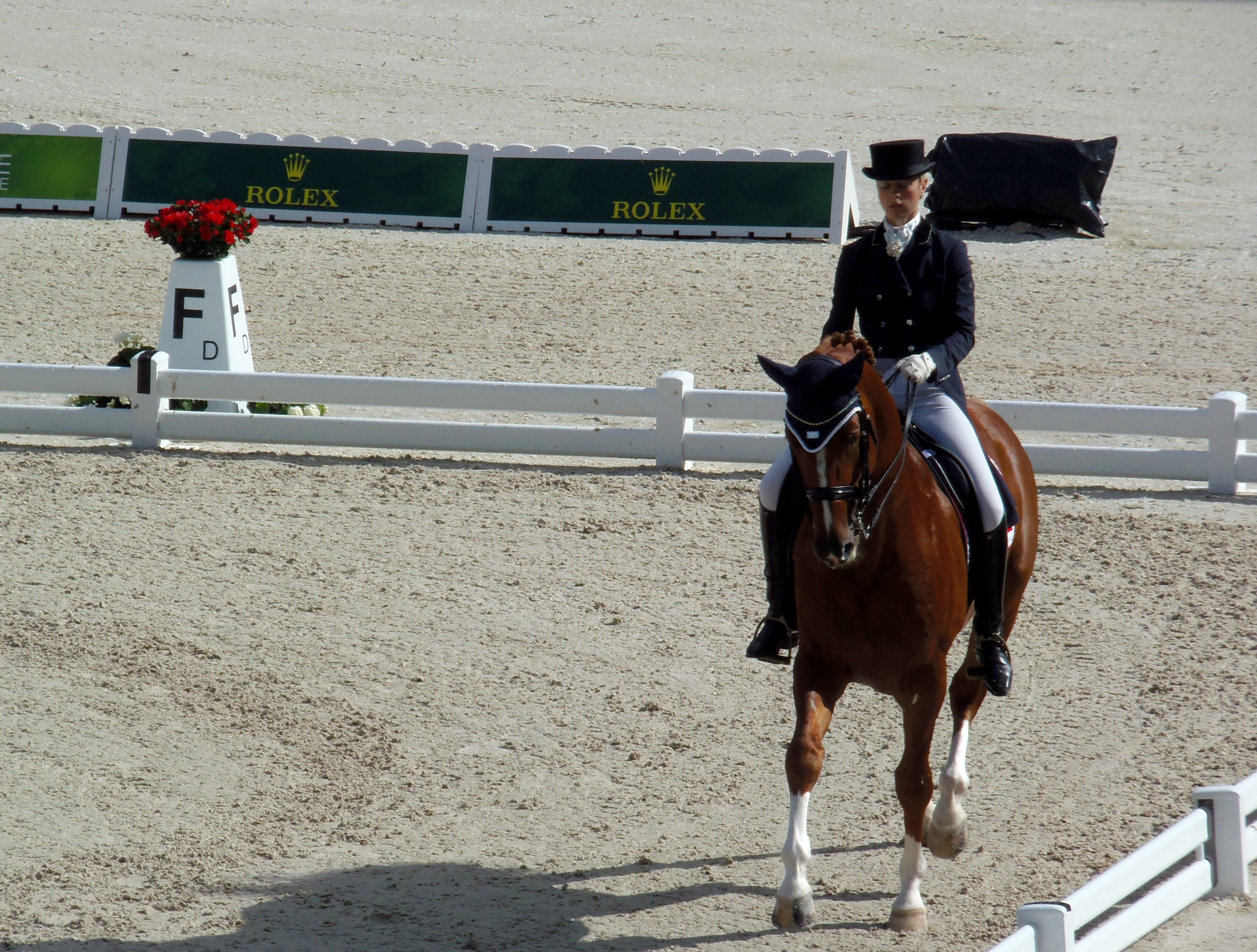
- Trude Hestengen and Tobajo Pik Disney (2014 FEI World Equestrian Games)

Personal information
- Born: 24 October 1983 (age 42)

Trude Hestengen (born 24 October 1983) is a Norwegian dressage rider. She represented Norway at the 2014 World Equestrian Games in Normandy, France and at the 2015 European Dressage Championships in Aachen, Germany with the stallion Tobajo Pik Disney, who was sold to Sweden right after the Europeans. In 2022 she was back at international Grand Prix level and represented Norway at the World Championship in Herning, Denmark with the 9-year old gelding Christianslund Fürstino. She is two times Norwegian champion at senior Grand Prix level (2013 and 2015) and won the silver medal at the 2022 Norwegian championship with her number one horse Fürstino

Her current best international championship result is 15th place in team dressage from the 2015 Europeans while her current best individual result is 24th place in Grand Prix Special dressage from the same championship.
