= Sascha Schulz =

Luxembourgish dressage rider (born 1972)

Personal information
- Born: July 19, 1972 (age 53) Mamer, Luxembourg

Sascha Schulz (born 19 July 1972 in Mamer, Luxembourg) is a Luxembourgish dressage rider. He represented Luxembourg at the 2014 World Equestrian Games in Normandy and at 2015 European Dressage Championships in Aachen.

His current best championship result is 14th place in team dressage at 2015 European Championships while his current best individual result is 56th place achieved at the same championships.
