= Leonardo Tiozzo =

Italian dressage rider

Personal information
- Born: May 28, 1994 (age 32) Rome, Italy

Leonardo Tiozzo (born 28 May 1994 in Rome, Italy) is an Italian dressage rider. He represented Italy at the 2014 World Equestrian Games in Normandy and at the 2015 European Dressage Championships in Aachen.

His current best championship result is 15th place in team dressage at the 2014 World Equestrian Games while his current best individual result is 53rd place at the 2015 Europeans.
