= José Antonio García Mena =

Spanish equestrian

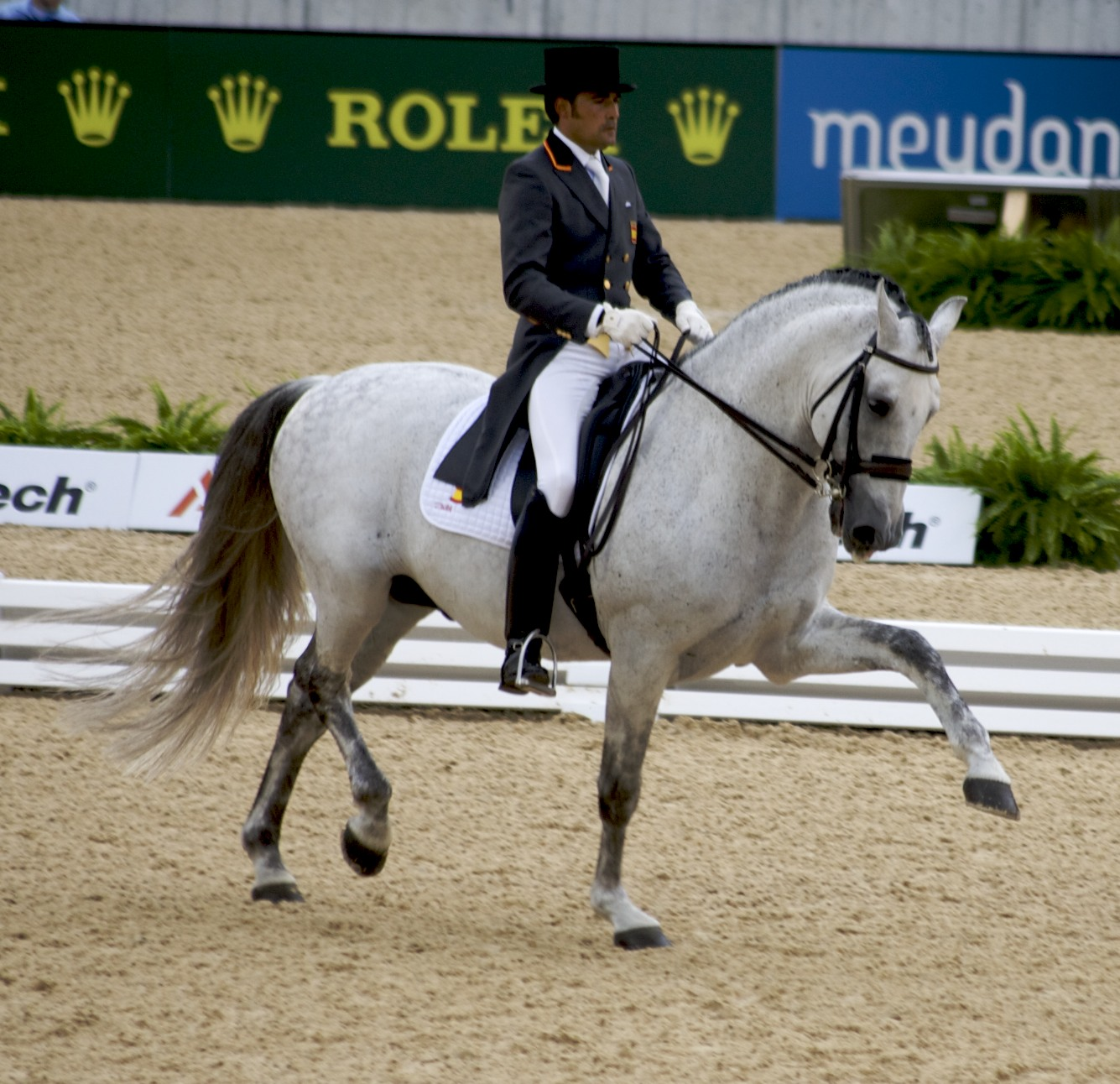
- García Mena and Norte at the 2010 World Equestrian Games

Personal information
- Born: 21 September 1980 (age 45) Cádiz, Spain

José Antonio García Mena (born 21 September 1980) is a Spanish dressage rider. Representing Spain, he competed at two World Equestrian Games (in 2010 and 2014) and at two European Dressage Championships (in 2013 and 2015).

His current best championship result is 4th place in team dressage at the 2015 European Dressage Championships while his current best individual result is 21st place from 2014 Worlds.

García Mena competed on the Grand Prix horses Dragao Figueiras and Norte. Dragao Figueiras was sold in 2015, and Norte retired the same year due to injury. For the 2016 Olympic show season, García Mena leased El Santo, a horse that had been successfully competed by German Olympian Isabell Werth over the years.
