= Maksim Kovshov =

Ukrainian dressage rider

Personal information
- Born: August 13, 1991 (age 34) Kyiv, Ukraine

Maksim Kovshov (born 13 August 1991 in Kyiv, Ukraine) is a Ukrainian dressage rider. He represented Ukraine at the 2014 World Equestrian Games, where he finished 19th with Ukrainian team in the team dressage and 88th in the individual dressage competitions.

In 2015, Kovshov competed at the European Championships in Aachen, where he placed 58th in the individual and 16th in the team competition. Two years later, in Gothenburg, he achieved his career-best championship results, finishing 56th in the individual competition and helping the Ukrainian team to the 15th-place result.

He is the grandson of Yuri Kovshov, the Olympic champion in team dressage and silver medalist in individual dressage at the 1980 Summer Olympics held in Moscow.
