= Arnaud Serre =

French equestrian

Personal information
- Born: 21 July 1976 (age 48)

Arnaud Serre (born 21 July 1976) is a French dressage rider. Representing France, he competed at 2014 World Equestrian Games and at two European Dressage Championships (in 2011 and 2015).

His current best championship result is 6th place in team dressage from the 2015 European Dressage Championships while his current best individual result is 27th place from the 2014 World Games, which were held in Normandy, France.
