= Laurence Vanommeslaghe =

Belgian dressage rider

Personal information
- Born: April 9, 1971 (age 55) Bruxelles

Laurence Vanommeslaghe (born 9 April 1971) is a Belgian dressage rider. She represented Belgium at the 2014 World Equestrian Games in Normandy where she finished 12th with Belgian team in the team competition and 46th in the individual dressage competition.

In 2015, Laurence competed at the European Dressage Championships where she finished 33rd in individual and 10th in team competition.
