= David Marcus (equestrian) =

Canadian dressage rider

Personal information
- Born: August 28, 1980 (age 45) Omaha, Nebraska, U.S.

Sport
- Sport: Equestrian
- Event: Dressage

David Marcus (born August 28, 1980, in Omaha, Nebraska) is an American-born, Canadian dressage rider.

He has been competing internationally for Canada since 2011. He competed at the 2012 Summer Olympics in London where he was eliminated during the Grand Prix test in the individual competition.

He also competed at the 2014 World Equestrian Games in Normandy where he finished 9th in team dressage and 34th in the individual contest.
