= Jeanna Högberg =

Swedish dressage rider

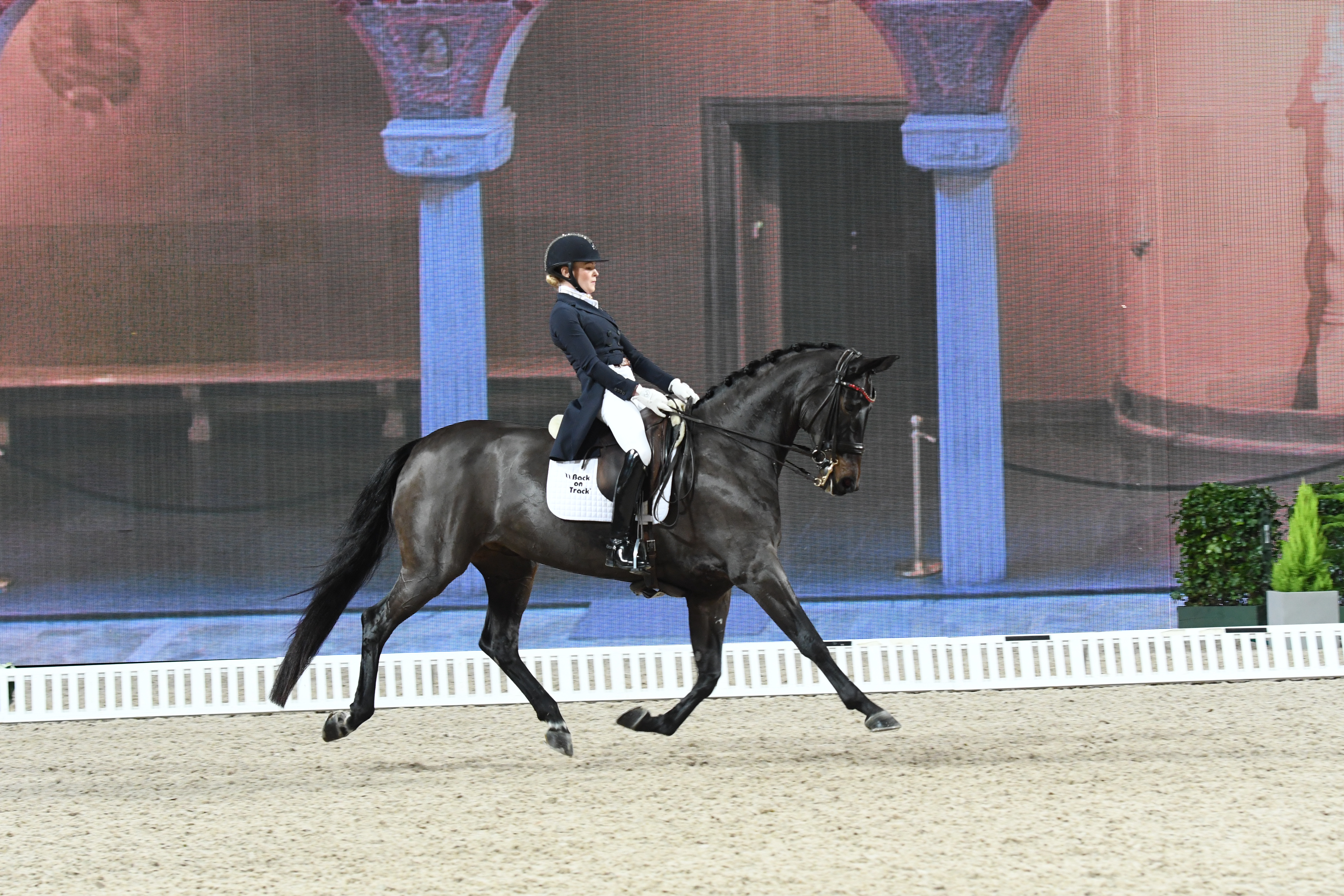
- Jeanna Högberg and JH’s Daenerys during Nat D - Dressage PFS Kür (Dressage Power Future Stars) during Sweden International Horse Show 2018.

Personal information
- Born: 16 June 1982 (age 44)

Sport
- Sport: Dressage
Medal record
Equestrian
Representing Sweden
World Championships for Young Horses
Gold medal – first place	2021 Verden	Individual dressage
Silver medal – second place	2016 Ermelo	Individual dressage

Jeanna Högberg (born 16 June 1982) is a Swedish dressage rider. She represented Sweden at the 2014 World Equestrian Games in Normandy, where she placed 6th in the team competition representing Sweden, and 39th in the individual dressage competition. She made her championships comeback at the 2021 European Dressage Championships, where she placed 5th with the Swedish team, and 19th as an individual riding Lorenzo.
