= Daniel Martin Dockx =

Spanish equestrian (born 1974)

Daniel Martín Dockx
Personal information
- Full name: José Daniel Martín Dockx
- Born: 7 January 1974 (age 52) Málaga, Spain

José Daniel Martín Dockx (born 7 January 1974) is a Spanish Olympic dressage rider. Representing Spain, he competed at two Summer Olympics (in 2012 and 2016). He finished 7th in the team competitions at both of the Olympics. Meanwhile, his current best individual Olympic achievement is 29th place from 2012.

He also participated at the 2014 World Equestrian Games and at three European Dressage Championships (in 2013, 2015 and 2023). His current best championship result is 4th place in team dressage at the 2015 European Dressage Championships while his current best individual result is 18th place from 2014 Worlds.

== Personal life ==
Born in Spain, Martín Dockx is of Belgian descent through his mother.
