= Terhi Stegars =

Finnish equestrian

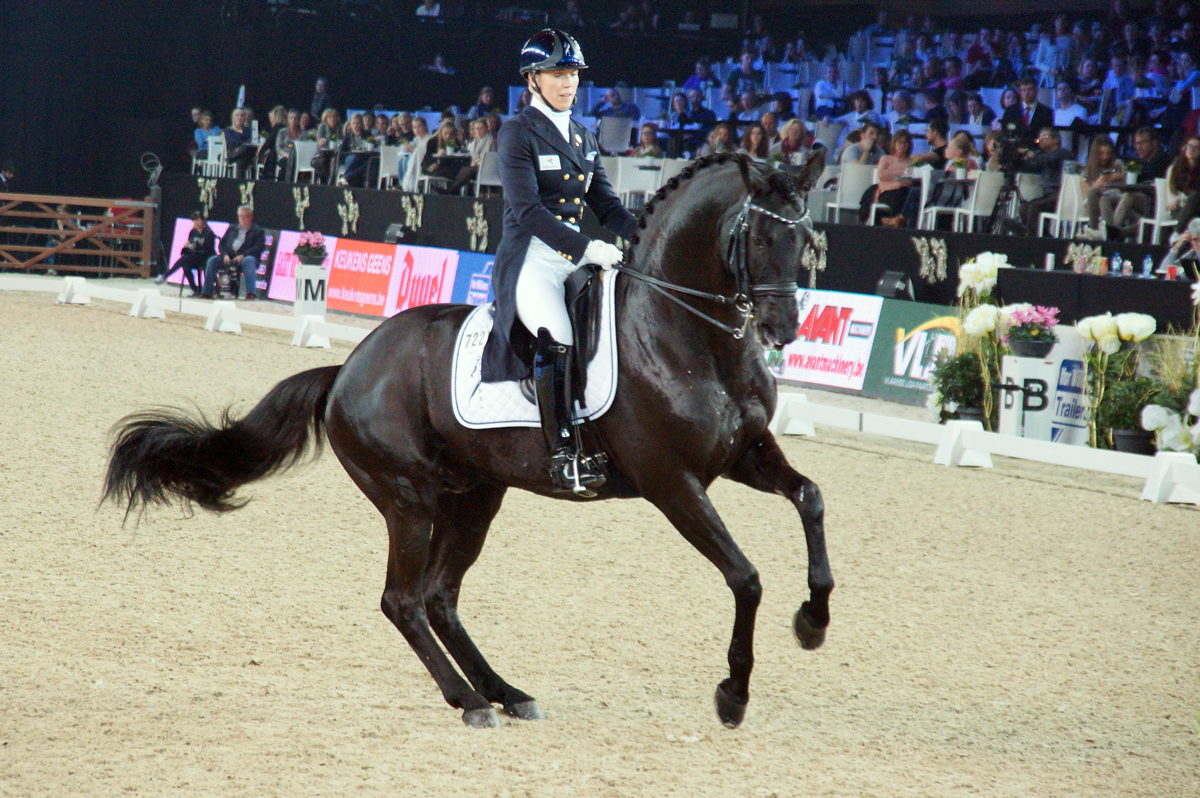
- Terhi Stegars and Axis TSF (2015)

Personal information
- Born: June 12, 1974 (age 52) Kangasala, Finland

Terhi Stegars (born 12 June 1974) is a Finnish dressage rider and trainer. Representing Finland, she has competed internationally, including at the World Equestrian Games and several European Dressage Championships. Stegars trains Grand Prix horses and has earned multiple national titles in Finland. She founded the Stegars Dressage Academy, an educational program for horses and riders.

== Early life ==
Stegars was born in Kangasala, Finland, developing an early passion for horses. In 1995, she relocated to Germany, training under prominent coaches including Jürgen Böckmann and Holger Schmezer. Her early success included becoming a two-time Finnish Grand Prix Champion with her horse Payano.

== Career ==
Stegars' international career expanded significantly after moving to Luxembourg in 2010, working with patron Tanja Kayser and riding the notable Trakehner stallion Axis TSF. She represented Finland at the European Championships (2011, 2015, 2017, 2019), the 2014 World Equestrian Games, and FEI World Cup Finals (2015, 2016). Stegars won the 2016 CDI-W Brno World Cup qualifier. In 2019, she became head rider at Luxembourg's Contern Dressage CenterShe did not complete in the 2024 Olympics. In 2024, she joined Austria's Gestüt Pramwaldhof, aiming to compete in the 2028 Olympics. In 2025 she was appointed as the Finnish youth national team coach.

== Achievements ==
=== National Titles ===
- Two-time Finnish Grand Prix dressage champion with Payano
- Topped national rankings in Finland and Luxembourg multiple times

=== International Championships ===
- Competed at the 2014 World Equestrian Games
- Competed at four European Dressage Championships (2011, 2015, 2017, 2019)
- Competed at FEI World Cup Finals (2015, Las Vegas; 2016, Gothenburg)

=== Grand Prix Victories ===
- Winner of several international Grand Prix competitions
- World Cup qualifier winner at 2016 CDI-W Brno (Grand Prix and Freestyle)

=== Team Performances ===
- 7th-place team finish at 2011 European Championships, Rotterdam
- Team medals at Nordic-Baltic Championships (two silver, one bronze, 2005–2008)
- Top-20 individual finish at the 2015 European Championships, Aachen

== Notable Horses ==
- Axis TSF – Trakehner stallion, top 30 FEI rankings, multiple international championships
- Payano – Trakehner stallion, two-time Finnish Champion
- Thai Pee – Oldenburg mare, competed at 2017 and 2019 European Championships
- Heartbreaker – Hanoverian gelding, later ridden by Emma Kanerva
- Dalou Shan – Hanoverian gelding, competed internationally at Grand Prix
- Valet – Finnish Warmblood gelding, Nordic-Baltic Championships medalist

== Stegars Dressage Academy ==
Stegars founded the academy initially based in Luxembourg and relocated to Austria in 2024. It provides comprehensive training programs from young horses to Grand Prix level, offering clinics internationally and emphasizing patient, systematic horse development.

== Personal life ==
Stegars married former British Army officer John “Ronnie” O’Sullivan in 2014. They have a son, Tomi Alexander (born 2017). Stegars continued competing internationally during and after her pregnancy. After 14 years in Luxembourg, she moved to Austria in 2024. Fluent in multiple languages, Stegars enjoys Finnish traditions, swimming, and reading, remaining an active ambassador for Finnish dressage.
