= Melanie Hofmann =

Swiss dressage rider (born 1977)

Personal information
- Nationality: Swiss
- Born: December 21, 1977 (age 48)

Melanie Hofmann (born 21 December 1977) is a Swiss dressage rider. Representing Switzerland, she competed at the 2014 World Equestrian Games and at the 2013 European Dressage Championship.

Her current best championship result is 9th place in team dressage at the 2013 Europeans held in Herning, while her current best individual result is 48th place from the same championships.
