= Karin Kosak =

Austrian dressage rider

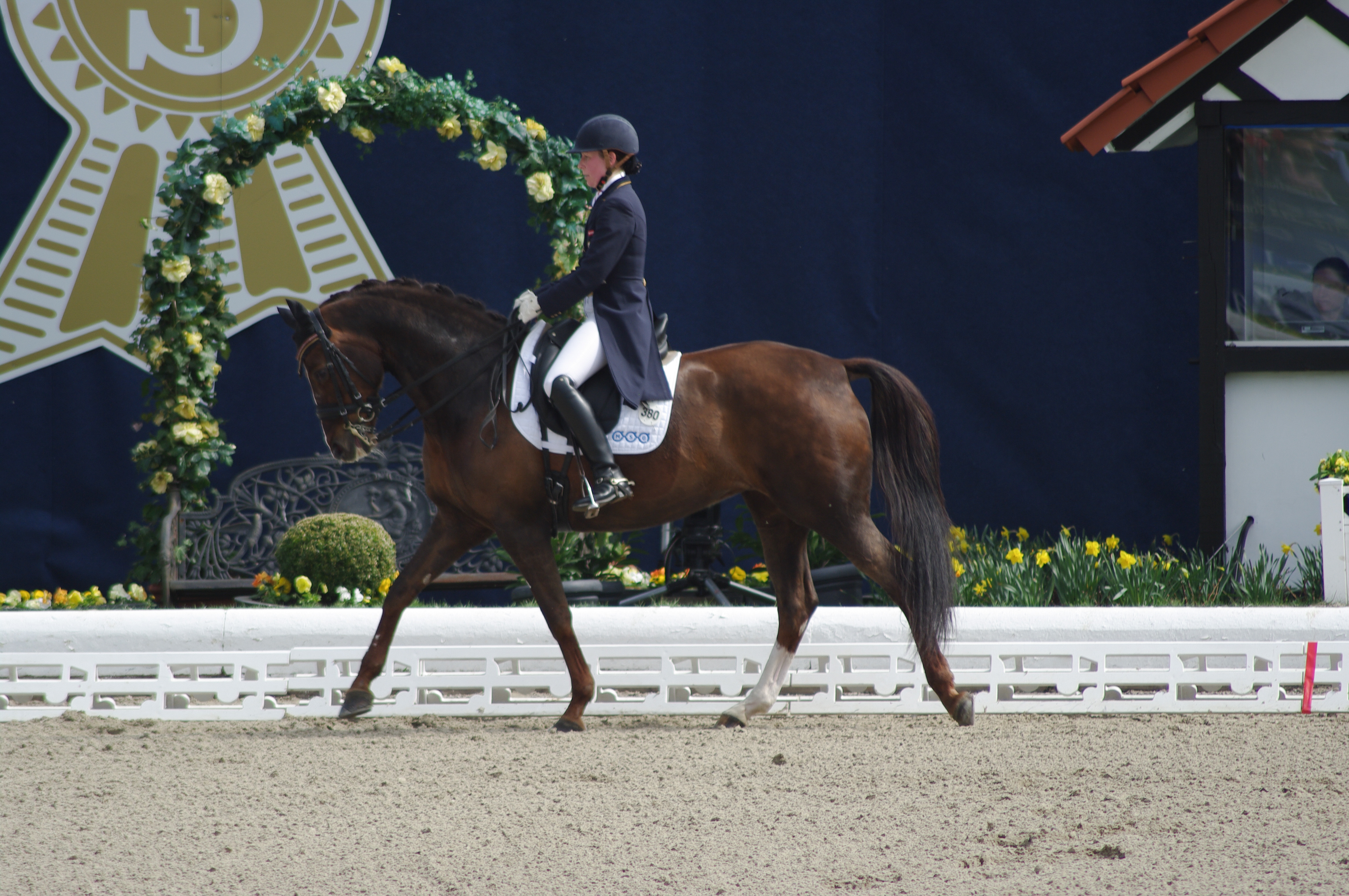
- Karin Kosak and Lucy's Day (2013)

Personal information
- Born: May 12, 1979 (age 47)

Karin Kosak (born 12 May 1979) is an Austrian dressage rider. Representing Austria, she competed at the 2014 World Equestrian Games and at the 2013 European Dressage Championship.

Her current best championship result is 6th place in team dressage at the 2013 Europeans held Herning while her current best individual result is 46th place from the same championships.
