= Ellen Birgitte Farbrot =

Norwegian dressage rider

Personal information
- Born: December 31, 1984 (age 41)

Achievements and titles
- Personal best(s): 68.239% (GP); 67.604% (GPS); 73.440% (GPF)

Ellen Birgitte "EB" Farbrot (born 31 December 1984) is a Norwegian dressage rider. She competed at two World Equestrian Games (in 2010 and 2014) and two European Dressage Championships (in 2013 and 2021).

Her personal best championship result is 12th place in team dressage from the 2010 World Equestrian Games, while her current best individual result is 56th place from the 2021 European Dressage Championships.

Farbrot qualified to compete at the Olympic Games in Tokyo, but withdrew in consideration with the owners of her horse Red Rebel. Farbrot said the travel to Tokyo is too much for her still inexperienced horse.
