= Inna Logutenkova =

Ukrainian equestrian (born 1986)

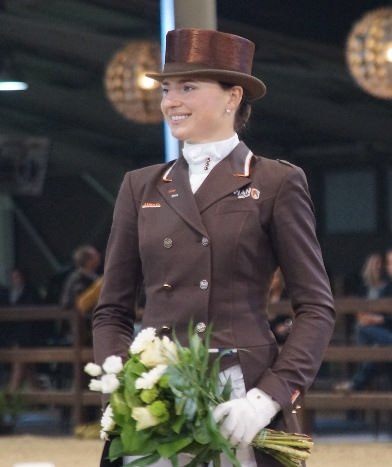

Personal information
- Nationality: Ukrainian
- Born: 19 October 1986 (age 39) Donetsk, Ukrainian SSR, Soviet Union

Sport
- Country: Ukraine
- Sport: Dressage
- Club: Stud Arenberg NV, Belgium
- Turned pro: 2011
- Coached by: Mykhailo Parkhomchuk

Achievements and titles
- Olympic finals: Rio de Janeiro 2016 Tokyo 2020
- World finals: 2014 FEI World Equestrian Games

Inna Volodymyrivna Logutenkova (Ukrainian: Інна Володимирівна Логутенкова; born 19 October 1986, Donetsk, Ukrainian SSR, Soviet Union) is a Ukrainian Olympic dressage rider. She represented Ukraine at the 2016 Summer Olympics in Rio de Janeiro, Brazil, where she placed 41st in the individual competition. Logutenkova also competed at the 2020 Summer Olympics in Tokyo where she finished 47th in the individual competition.

She also participated at two World Equestrian Games (in 2014 and 2018) and three European Dressage Championships (in 2013, 2015 and 2017). Her current best championship result is 15th place with the Ukrainian team in team dressage at the 2017 Europeans. Meanwhile, her best individual result is 42nd place from the 2015 Europeans.

Logutenkova competed at the 2013 edition of the Dressage World Cup finals.
