= Lillann Jebsen =

Norwegian dressage rider

Personal information
- Born: 16 December 1987 (age 38)

Lillann Jebsen (born 16 December 1987) is a Norwegian dressage rider. Representing Norway, she competed at two World Equestrian Games (in 2010 and 2014) and at two European Dressage Championships (in 2011 and 2013).

Her current best championship result is 11th place in team dressage at the 2011 European Dressage Championship in Rotterdam while her current best individual championship result is 29th place from the 2010 World Equestrian Games held in Kentucky. She also competed at the 2013 Dressage World Cup Final in Gothenburg, Sweden where she finished 11th.

She competed with Pro-Set at all of the championships, the former horse of Carl Hester.
