= Filipe Canelas =

Portuguese dressage rider

Personal information
- Born: October 14, 1966 (age 59) Elvas, Portugal

Filipe Canelas (born 14 October 1966 in Elvas, Portugal) is a Portuguese dressage rider. He competed at the 2014 World Equestrian Games and three European Dressage Championships (in 2013, 2015 and 2021). He competed aboard Der Clou (2013 through 2015), and Fortuna (2021).

His best championships results were achieved at the 2021 European Dressage Championships, where he placed 10th with the Portuguese team and 35th individually.
