= Diane Erpelding =

Luxembourgish dressage rider

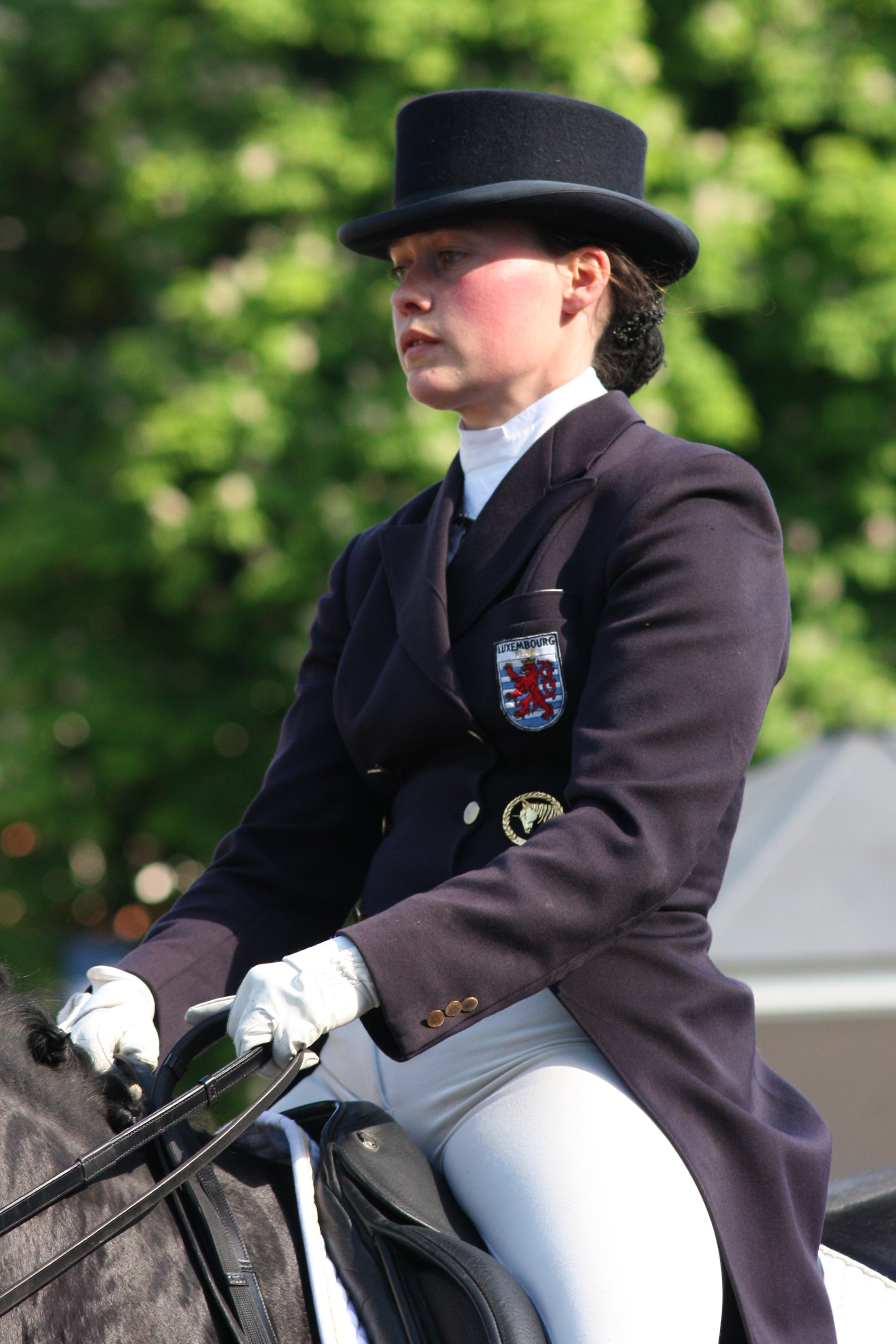
- Diane Erpelding (2013)

Personal information
- Born: March 14, 1982 (age 44)

Diane Erpelding (born 14 March 1982) is a Luxembourgish dressage rider. Representing Luxembourg, she competed at the 2014 World Equestrian Games and at two European Dressage Championships (in 2013 and 2015).

Her current best championship result is 14th place in team dressage at the 2013 European Championships in Herning while her current best individual result 54th place at the 2015 Europeans in Aachen.
