= Roland Tong =

Irish dressage rider

Personal information
- Born: March 5, 1979 (age 47)

Roland Tong (born 5 March 1979) is an Irish dressage rider. Representing Ireland, he competed at the 2014 World Equestrian Games and at the 2013 European Dressage Championship.

His current best championship result is 22nd place in team dressage from the 2014 World Equestrian Games in Normandy while his current best individual result is 41st place from the 2013 Europeans held in Herning.
