= Julie de Deken =

Belgian dressage rider

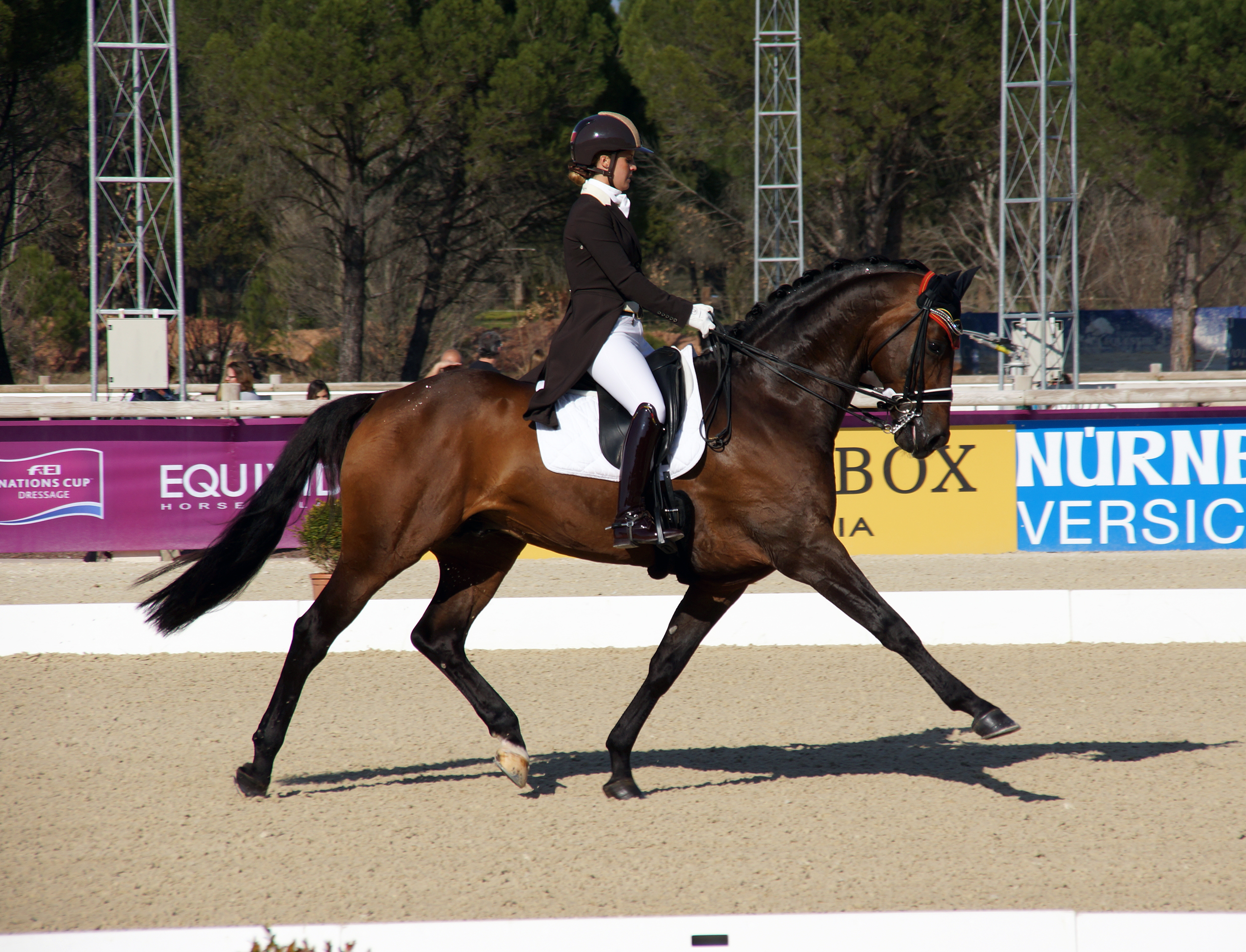

Personal information
- Born: 13 December 1985 (age 40)

Julie de Deken (born 13 December 1985) is a Belgian dressage rider. Representing Belgium, she competed at the 2014 World Equestrian Games and at the 2013 European Dressage Championship.

Her current best championship result is 7th place in team dressage from the 2013 Europeans held in Herning while her current best individual result is 37th place from the same championship.
