= Veronique Henschen =

Luxembourgish dressage rider

Personal information
- Born: April 8, 1988 (age 38)

Veronique Henschen (born 8 April 1988) is a Luxembourgish dressage rider. Representing Luxembourg, she competed at the 2014 World Equestrian Games and at two European Dressage Championships (in 2013 and 2015).

Her current best championship result is 14th place in team dressage at the 2013 Europeans held in Herning while her current best individual result is 36th place from the same championships.
