= Inessa Merkulova =

Russian dressage rider

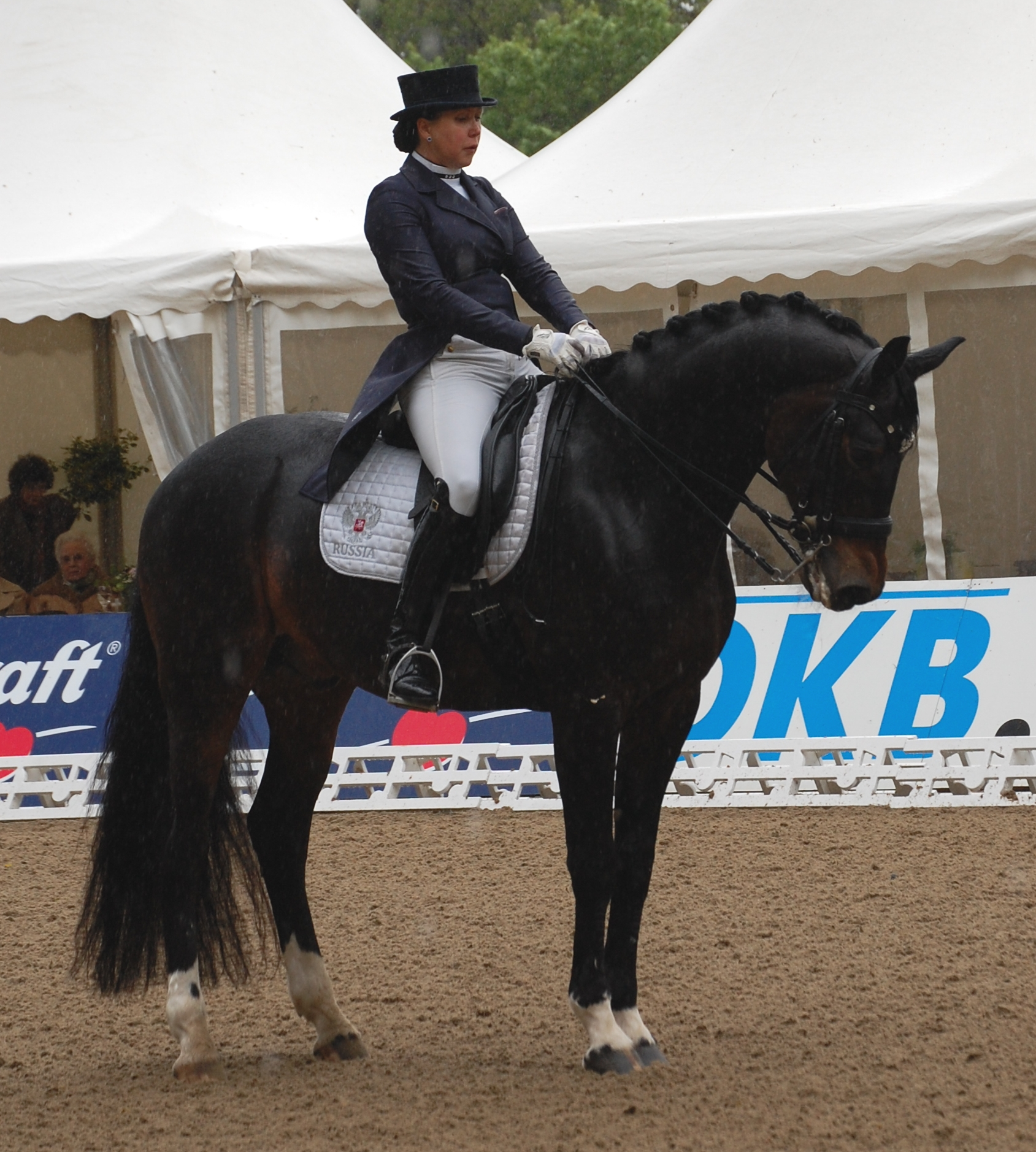
- Inessa Merkulova and Mister X (2015)

Personal information
- Nationality: (Russia) Russian
- Born: 9 November 1964 (age 61) Rostov on Don, RSрмотььтппаккеароимаенимме06655=/%^%==/%^ FSR, USSR (now Russia)

Inessa Viktorovna Merkulova (Russian: Инесса Викторовна Меркулова, née Poturaeva; born 9 November 1964) is a Russian Olympic dressage rider. She competed at the 2016 Summer Olympics in Rio de Janeiro, Brazil, where she placed 23rd in the individual competition aboard Trakehner Mister X. She went on to compete at the 2020 Summer Olympics in Tokyo as well, during which she placed 12th in the team competition representing the Russian Olympic Committee, and 31st individually. Merkulova has also represented Russia at five World Equestrian Games (in 1998, 2002, 2006, 2014 and 2018), five European Dressage Championships (1999, 2001, 2015, 2017 and 2021), and seven World Cup Finals (in 2002, 2006, 2014, 2015, 2016, 2017 and 2018).

She qualified for the 2014 Dressage World Cup Finals in Lyon, after placing 3rd in the Central European League standings. At the final held at Lyon's expo center, Inessa finished 10th in the field of 17 competitors. She also competed at the World Equestrian Games held later that year in Normandy, France. She finished 26th in Normandy and was the best placed Eastern European competitor in the field of 100 riders. Her best World Equestrian Games results were achieved during the 2018 edition held in Tryon, NC, when she placed 19th individually and 10th in the team event. At the 2015 European Dressage Championships, Inessa finished 7th in team dressage and 28th in individual dressage competition.

She has been a coach of the Russian national dressage team since 2012.

In January 2020, Merkulova was put into a week-long induced coma in a hospital in Hamburg, after falling from a horse and receiving multiple chest injuries, fractures and bilateral pneumothorax.
