= Jessica Michel =

French dressage rider

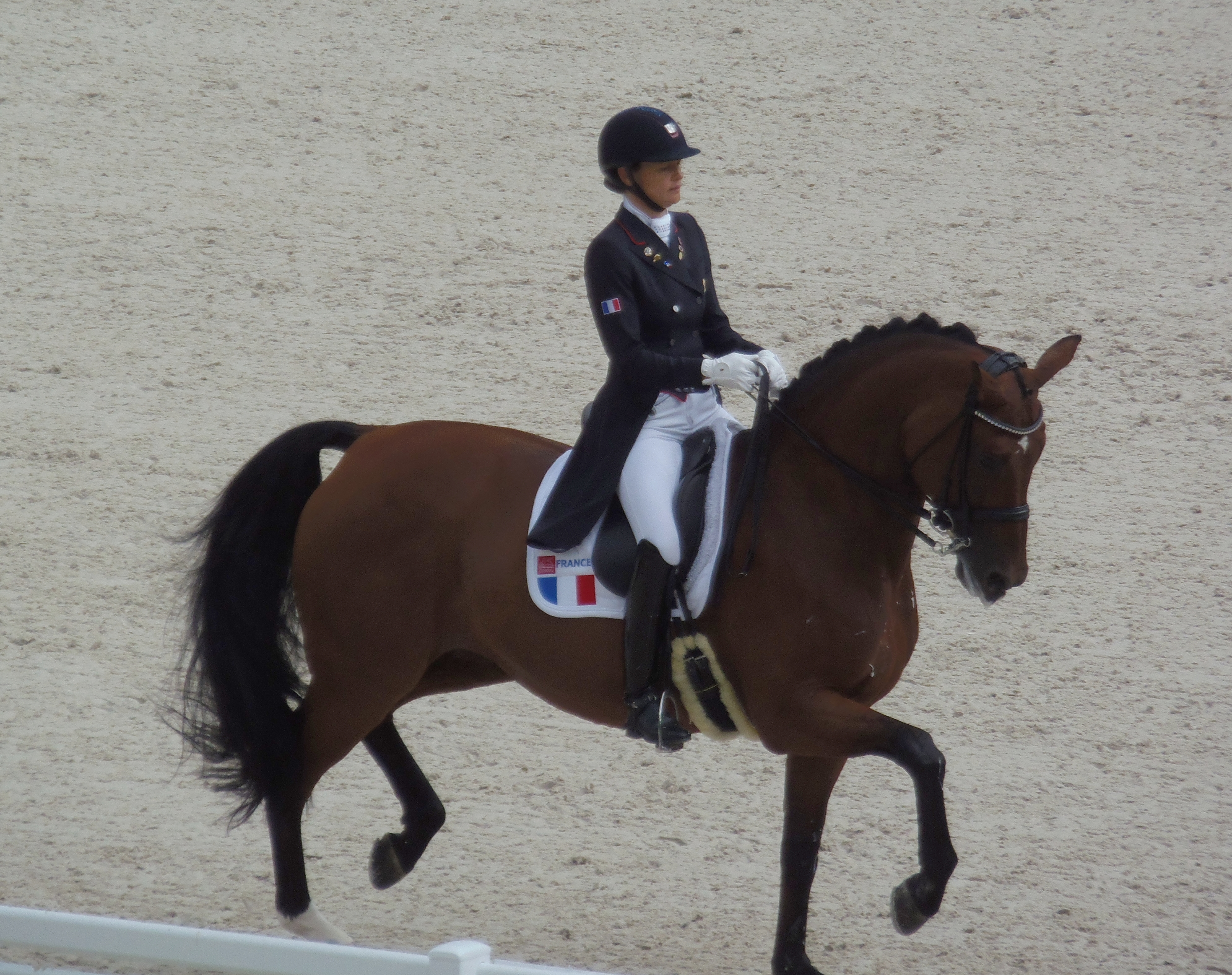
- Jessica Michel (2014)

Personal information
- Full name: Jessica Michel Botton
- Nickname: Jess
- Born: Jun 22, 1982 (age 44) Paris, France

Sport
- Country: France
- Sport: Dressage
- Club: Haras de Hus, France
- Turned pro: 2006
- Coached by: Hans Heinrich Meyer zu Strohen

Achievements and titles
- Olympic finals: London 2012
- World finals: 2014 FEI World Equestrian Games

Jessica Michel Botton (born 22 June 1982, in Paris) is a French dressage rider. She competed at the 2012 Summer Olympics in the individual. Her husband, Gilles Botton represents Belgium in showjumping.
