= Stella Hagelstam =

Finnish dressage rider

Personal information
- Born: February 28, 1984 (age 42) Sipoo, Finland

Stella Hagelstam (born 28 February 1984 in Sipoo, Finland) is a Finnish dressage rider. Representing Finland, she competed at the 2014 World Equestrian Games and 2013 European Dressage Championships.

Her best championship result is 10th place in team dressage and 45th place in individual dressage from the 2013 European Championships.
