= Federica Scolari =

Italian equestrian

Personal information
- Born: April 1, 1988 (age 38) Brescia, Italy

Federica Scolari (born 1 April 1988 in Brescia, Italy) is an Italian dressage rider. Representing Italy, she competed at the 2014 World Equestrian Games and at two European Dressage Championships (in 2013 and 2015).

Her current best championship result is 12th place in team dressage at the 2013 Europeans held Herning while her current best individual result is 57th place from the same championships.
