= Renate Voglsang =

Austrian dressage rider

Renate Vogelsang
Personal information
- Born: 10 June 1971 (age 55) Munich, West Germany

Renate Vogelsang (born 10 June 1971 in Munich, West Germany) is an Austrian Olympic dressage rider. Representing Austria, she competed at the 2012 Summer Olympics in London where she finished 36th in the individual competition.

She also competed at the 2014 World Equestrian Games and four European Dressage Championships (in 2003, 2005, 2011 and 2013). Her current best championship result 6th place in team dressage at the 2013 European Dressage Championship while her current best individual placement was 27th place from the same championship.
