= Patrik Kittel =

Swedish horse rider

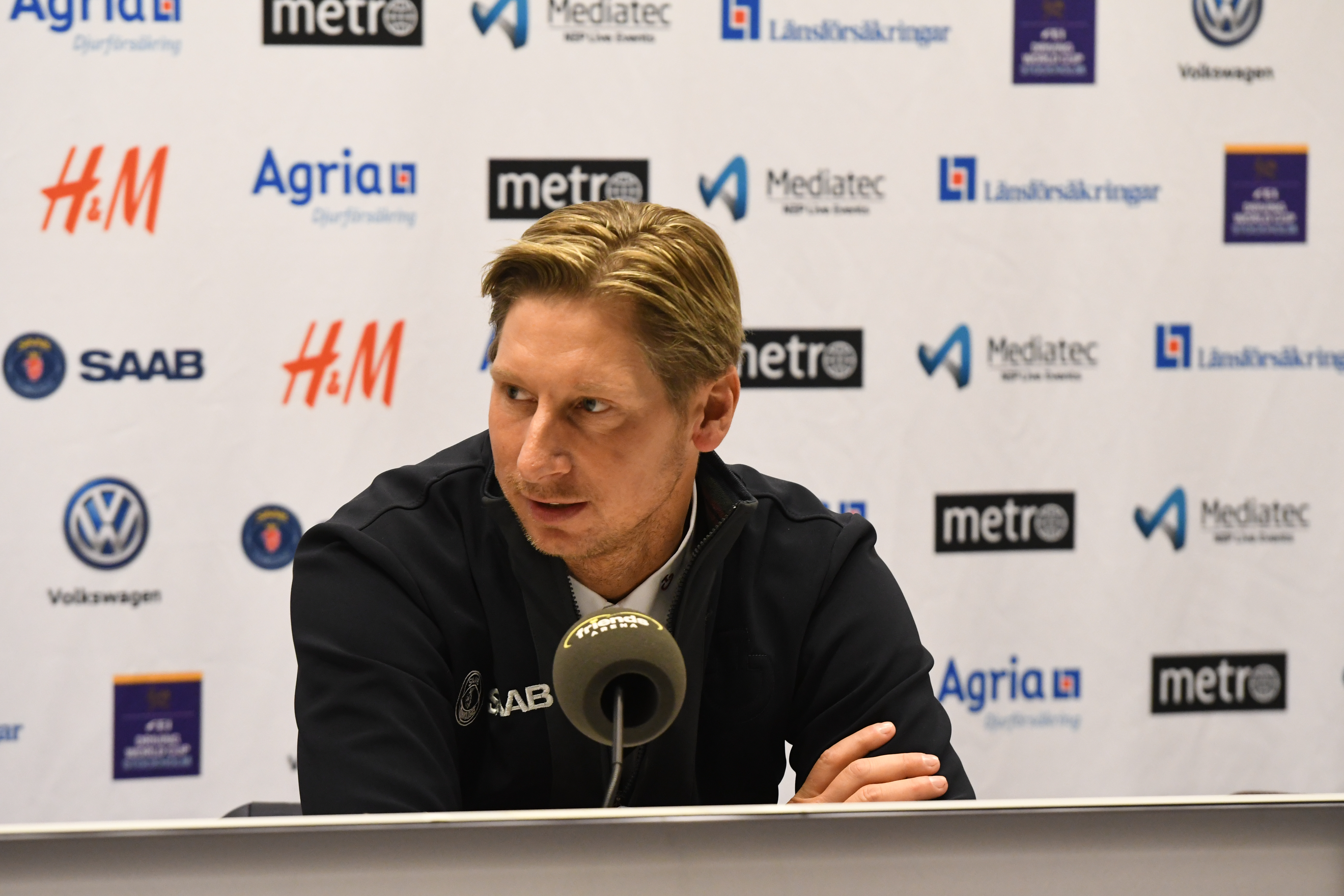
- Kittel in 2018

Personal information
- Full name: Patrik Alexander Kittel
- Born: 10 June 1976 (age 50) Österåker, Sweden
- Height: 186 cm (6 ft 1 in)
- Spouse: Lyndal Oatley
Medal record
Equestrian
Representing Sweden
European Championships
Bronze medal – third place	2011 Rotterdam	Freestyle dressage
Bronze medal – third place	2017 Gothenburg	Team dressage
Bronze medal – third place	2019 Rotterdam	Team dressage
World Cup
Gold medal – first place	2024 Riyadh	Individual dressage

Patrik Alexander Kittel (born 10 June 1976) is a Swedish dressage rider. He was born in Stockholm. He competed at the 2008 Summer Olympics in Beijing, where he placed fourth in team dressage. At the 2012 Summer Olympics he competed in the team dressage events and qualified for the Grand Prix Special and Grand Prix Freestyle, finishing 14th.

In 2024, Kittel was chosen to represent Sweden at the 2024 Olympic Games, where he placed 14th in the individual competition.

== Controversy ==
In 2009, a video of Kittel riding Watermill Scandic using rollkur, or hyperflexion of the horse's neck during warm up at a competition in Denmark caused international outcry. The horse's tongue appeared to turn blue as a result of the maneuver, leading to the "blue-tongue scandal". Tens of thousands of letters in protest were sent to dressage's world governing body, the International Federation for Equestrian Sports (FEI), who banned the practice of rollkur after public pressure. At the 2012 Summer Olympics in London, Kittel was pictured riding Scandic in rollkur in the warm up prior to the competition. In response to public outcry, the FEI reported the images were taken during an "inopportune moment".

In 2024, Kittel was pictured riding in competitions in Amsterdam and Neumünster where his horse's tongue was noticeably blue, suggesting his mount was in pain and had lost oxygen. The FEI claimed to be looking into the allegations. At the 2024 Summer Olympic Games, Kittel's horse Touchdown was again pictured with a blue tongue. When asked about the incident, Göran Åkerström, the International Equestrian Federation chief veterinarian said a blue tongue was unacceptable.

== Personal life ==
He is married to Australian dressage rider Lyndal Oatley.
