= Mikaela Fabricius-Bjerre =

Finnish equestrian (1969–2023)

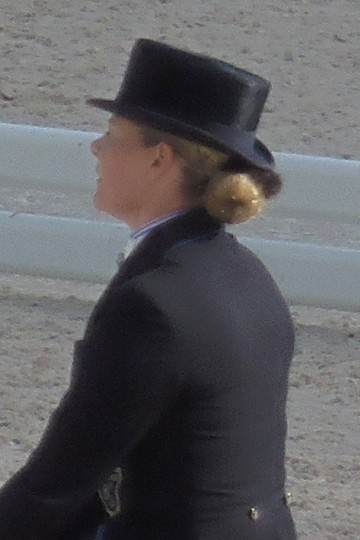
- Fabricius-Bjerre in 2014

Personal information
- Birth name: Mikaela Lindh
- Nickname: Fia
- Born: 17 December 1969; Turku, Finland
- Died: 13 February 2023 (aged 53)
- Website: http://dressurstald.com/

Sport
- Country: Finland
- Sport: Equestrian
- Club: Stable Solyst, Denmark
- Coached by: Jon Pedersen

Achievements and titles
- Olympic finals: 2012 Olympic Games
- World finals: 2014 FEI World Equestrian Games

Mikaela Fabricius-Bjerre (née Lindh; 17 December 1969 – 13 February 2023) was a Finnish dressage rider. She represented Finland in 2012 Summer Olympics in London finishing 30th.

Fabricius-Bjerre died from cancer on 13 February 2023, at the age of 53.
