= Ester Soldi =

Italian equestrian (born 1970)

Personal information
- Born: February 15, 1970 (age 56) Varese, Italy

Sport
- Club: Fiamme Azzurre

Ester Soldi (born 15 February 1970 in Varese, Italy) is an Italian dressage rider. Representing Italy, she competed at the 2014 World Equestrian Games and at three European Dressage Championships (in 2011, 2013 and 2015).

Her current best championship result is 12th place in team dressage at the 2013 Europeans held in Herning while her current best individual result is 59th place accomplished at the 2011 European Championship in Rotterdam.
