= Tatiana Dorofeeva (equestrian) =

Russian dressage rider

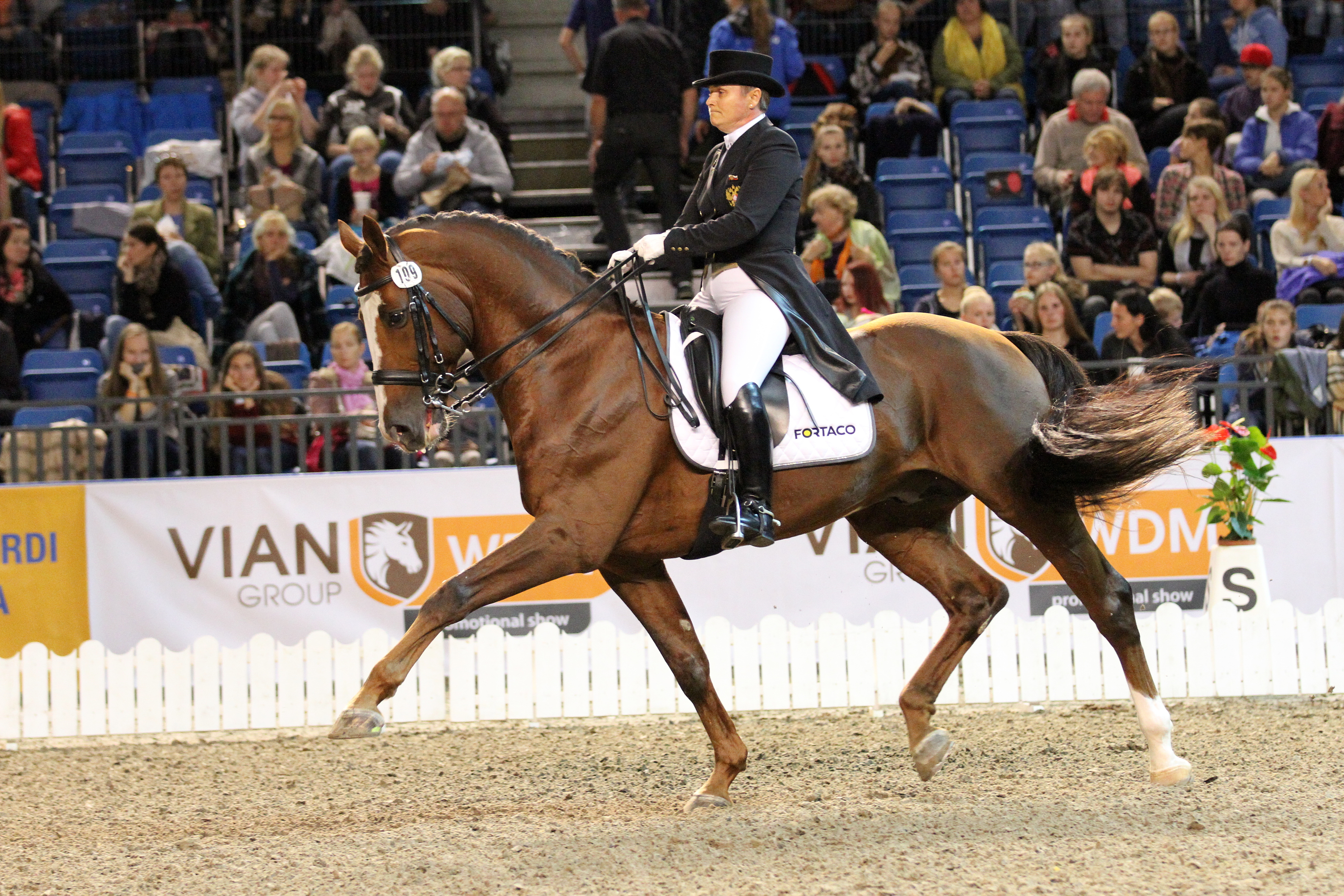

Personal information
- Born: February 2, 1965 (age 61) Ryazan, Russia

Tatiana Dorofeeva (born 2 February 1965 in Ryazan, Russia) is a Russian dressage rider. Representing Russia, she competed at the 2014 World Equestrian Games and at two European Dressage Championships (in 2011 and 2013).

Her current best championship result is 16th place in team dressage at the 2011 European Dressage Championship in Rotterdam while her current best individual result is 55th place from the same championships. She also competed at the 2013, 2015 and 2016 where she finished 17th, 16th and 17th, respectively.

Her father Vitaly Dorofeev was a member of a Soviet eventing team.
