= 2012 CHIO Aachen =

Horse show in Aachen, Germany

The 2012 CHIO Aachen was the 2012 edition of the CHIO Aachen, the German official horse show in five horse sport disciplines (show jumping, dressage, eventing, four-in-hand-driving and vaulting).

== Introduction ==
The 2012 CHIO Aachen is held as CSIO 5* (show jumping), CDIO 5* (dressage), CICO 3* (eventing), CAIO (four-in-hand-driving) and CVIO 3* (vaulting). The event is held between June 29, 2012 and July 8, 2012.

The CHIO Aachen is in show jumping and dressage often called as the most prestigious horse show in Europe. It is also called "Weltfest der Pferdesports" (World Equestrian Festival). The competitions are held at different places at the Soers in Aachen. The show jumping competitions are held in the "Hauptstadion" of the CHIO Aachen, the dressage event are held in the "Deutsche Bank Stadion" and the vaulting competitions are held in the "Albert-Vahle-Halle".

The first horse show were held 1924 in Aachen, together with a horse race. In 1927 the horse show lasted six days. The first show jumping Nations Cup was held here in 1929. Since 2007, influenced by the World Equestrian Games 2006 in Aachen, also eventing and vaulting are disciplines of the CHIO Aachen. In 2012 the eventing Nations Cup is first time part of the new FEI Nations Cup Eventing.

== Nations Cup of Germany (vaulting) ==
The 2012 vaulting Nations Cup of Germany was part of the 2012 CHIO Aachen and was held Sunday, July 1. It was a combined competition of three Freestyle vaulting competitions (single vaulting – Men, single vaulting – Women and team vaulting). Unlike the other disciplines nations could start with more than one team.

	Team	Vaulter	Group	Lunger	Horse	result
1	Germany I	Sarah Kay		Lasse Kristensen	Fruerholms Cato	8.166
1	Germany I	Erik Oese		Kai Vorberg	Sir Bernhard RS von der Wintermühle	8.572
1	Germany I		RSV Neuss Grimlinghausen	Jessica Schmitz	Arkansas	9.251
1	Germany I					25.989
2	Austria	Lisa Krakowitzer		Veronika Greisberger	Pink Floyd	8.047
2	Austria	Stefan Csandl		Julie Newell	Solitaire Legacy	8.793
2	Austria		UVT Salzburg / Freisaal	Nina Rossin	Robin	8.786
2	Austria					25.626
3	Germany II	Viktor Brüsewitz		Silke Gedien	Rockard H	8.140
3	Germany II	Regina Burgmayr		Alexander Hartl	Lazio	8.052
3	Germany II		Voltigierverein Ingelsberg	Alexander Hartl	Adlon	8.997
3	Germany II					25.605
4	United States I	Alicen Divita		Elke Schelp-Lensing	Pino del Rio	8.224
4	United States I	Gabe Aniello		Agnes Forst	Forrest Cump	8.174
4	United States I		Mt. Eden Sun	Lasse Kristensen	Jarl	8.727
4	United States I					25.125

(Top 4 of 8 teams)

== Prize of Europe (show jumping) ==
The "Preis von Europa" (Prize of Europe), a competition held since 1960, was the first main competition in show jumping at the 2012 CHIO Aachen. The sponsor of this competition was the Warsteiner Brewery. It was held on Wednesday, July 4, 2012 at 2:15 pm. The competition was a show jumping competition with one round and one jump-off, the height of the fences were up to 1.55 meters. The Prize of Europe was endowed with 60,300 €.

As in much competitions in this year (for example the Grand Prixs of La Baule and Hamburg), the name of the winner of this competition is Nick Skelton. He, riding the 9-year-old stallion Big Star, was the fastest faultless rider in a jump-off with 12 riders.

	Rider	Horse	Round 1	jump-off		prize money
	Rider	Horse	Penalties	Penalties	Time (s)	prize money
1	(United Kingdom) Nick Skelton	Big Star	0	0	49.77	15,000 €
2	(Germany) Christian Ahlmann	Taloubet Z	0	0	50.48	12,000 €
3	(Switzerland) Janika Sprunger	Palloubet d'Halong	0	0	51.29	9,000 €
4	(Germany) Marc Bettinger	Oh d´Eole	0	0	52.03	6,000 €
5	(Ukraine) Katharina Offel	Vivant	0	4	53.65	4,200 €

(Top 5 of 55 Competitors)

== Grand Prix de Dressage / Nations Cup of Germany (dressage) ==
The 2012 dressage Nations Cup of Germany was part of the 2012 CHIO Aachen. Each team consist of three or four team riders, three results of each team count for the Nations Cup ranking. Because the Olympic Games in London, which start only three weeks after the CHIO Aachen, much nations did not start with their top teams. The German team with all four riders that are likely to start in London, win the competition.

The sponsor of the Grand Prix de Dressage was Tesch Inkasso, the dressage Nations Cup ranking was sponsored by the Lambertz-Group.

=== Team result ===
	Team	Rider	Horse	Score
1	Germany	Dorothee Schneider	Diva Royal	74.277 %
1	Germany	Anabel Balkenhol	Dablino FRH	75.426 %
1	Germany	Kristina Sprehe	Desperados	79.702 %
1	Germany	Helen Langehanenberg	Damon Hill NRW	78.426 %
1	Germany			233.554 %
2	Denmark	Sidsel Johansen	Schianto	69.596 %
2	Denmark	Anne van Olst	Clearwater	72.638 %
2	Denmark	Anna Kasprzak	Donnperignon	73.426 %
2	Denmark	Nathalie of Sayn-Wittgenstein	Digby	74.936 %
2	Denmark			221.000 %
3	Netherlands	Stephanie Peters	Unlimited	69.064 %
3	Netherlands	Marlies van Baalen	Miciano	69.660 %
3	Netherlands	Imke Schellekens-Bartels	Toots	71.596 %
3	Netherlands	Patrick van der Meer	Uzzo	72.936 %
3	Netherlands			214.192 %
5	Sweden	Michelle Hagman	TSF Rudi´s Memory	67.021 %
5	Sweden	Sofie Lexner	Charming Boy	70.340 %
5	Sweden	Maria von Essen	Ferdi	70.106 %
5	Sweden	Patrik Kittel	Toy Story	71.128 %
5	Sweden			211.574 %
7	Spain	Carmen Naesgaard	Ciowa	64.255 %
7	Spain	Ignacio Rambla	Fogonero IX	65.745 %
7	Spain	Jose Daniel Martin Dockx	Grandioso	70.468 %
7	Spain	Beatriz Ferrer-Salat	Delgado	72.638 %
7	Spain			208.851 %
8	Australia	Rozzie Ryan	Bullwinkle	66.000 %
8	Australia	Hayley Beresford	Belissimo NRW	69.426 %
8	Australia	Kristy Oatley	Clive	68.383 %
8	Australia	Lyndal Oatley	Sandro Boy	68.936 %
8	Australia			206.745 %
2	Great Britain	Nikki Crisp	Pasoa	69.574 %
2	Great Britain	Hannah Biggs	Weltzin	67.149 %
2	Great Britain	Emma Hindle	Diamond Hit	69.851 %
2	Great Britain			206.574 %

(grey penalties points do not count for the team result)

=== Individual result ===
	Rider	Horse	Score	prize money (€)
1	(Germany) Kristina Sprehe	Desperados	79.702 %	7,800 €
2	(Germany) Helen Langehanenberg	Damon Hill NRW	78.426 %	5,500 €
3	(Austria) Victoria Max-Theurer	Augustin OLD	77.894 %	3,600 €
4	(Germany) Anabel Balkenhol	Dablino FRH	75.426 %	2,200 €
5	(Denmark) Nathalie of Sayn-Wittgenstein	Digby	74.936 %	1,400 €

(top 5 of 36 competitors)

== FEI Nations Cup of Germany (show jumping) ==
The 2012 FEI Nations Cup of Germany in show jumping was part of the 2012 CHIO Aachen. It was the fifth competition of the 2012 FEI Nations Cup.

The 2012 FEI Nations Cup of Germany was held on Thursday, July 5, 2012 at 7:30 pm (second round under floodlight). The competing teams are: Sweden, Switzerland, Germany, France, Belgium, the Netherlands, Great Britain and Ireland.

The competition was a show jumping competition with two rounds and optionally one jump-off. The height of the fences were up to 1.60 meters. The Nations Cup was endowed with 250,000 €. Mercedes-Benz is the sponsor of this competition.

	Team	Rider	Horse	Round A	Round B	Total penalties	Jump-off		Prize money	scoring points
	Team	Rider	Horse	Penalties	Penalties	Total penalties	Penalties	Time (s)	Prize money	scoring points
1	France	Eugénie Angot	Old Chap Tame	0	5					
1	France	Roger-Yves Bost	Nippon d´Elle	1	5					
1	France	Pénélope Leprevost	Mylord Carthago	0	0					
1	France	Olivier Guillon	Lord de Theize	4	4					
1	France			1	9	10			72,000 €	10
2	Germany	Marcus Ehning	Plot Blue	0	0					
2	Germany	Christian Ahlmann	Codex One	0	0					
2	Germany	Janne Friederike Meyer	Lambrasco	4	8					
2	Germany	Marco Kutscher	Cornet Obolensky	16	16					
2	Germany			4	8	12			44,000 €	7
3	Ireland	Denis Lynch	Lantinus	4	8					
3	Ireland	Dermott Lennon	Lou-Lou	4	16					
3	Ireland	Billy Twomey	Je T´Aime Flamenco	12	0					
3	Ireland	Cian O'Connor	Blue Loyd	4	0					
3	Ireland			12	8	20			34,000 €	6
4	Switzerland	Werner Muff	Kiamon	8	12					
4	Switzerland	Paul Estermann	Castlefield Eclipse	0	0					
4	Switzerland	Steve Guerdat	Carpalo	5	8					
4	Switzerland	Pius Schwizer	Carlina	8	0					
4	Switzerland			13	8	21			25,000 €	5
5	Great Britain	Nick Skelton	Carlo	4	5					
5	Great Britain	Guy Williams	Titus II	17	16					
5	Great Britain	Scott Brash	Intertoy Z	12	4					
5	Great Britain	Michael Whitaker	Amai	1	5					
5	Great Britain			17	14	31			18,000 €	4
6	Netherlands	Leon Thijssen	Tyson	0	12					
6	Netherlands	Marc Houtzager	Tamino	4	4					
6	Netherlands	Harrie Smolders	Walnut de Muze	4	8					
6	Netherlands	Maikel van der Vleuten	Verdi	4	did not start					
6	Netherlands			8	24	32			12,000 €	3
7	Sweden	Rolf-Göran Bengtsson	Casall	4	4					
7	Sweden	Peder Fredricson	Arctic Aurora Borealis	eliminated	did not start					
7	Sweden	Lisen Bratt Fredricson	Matrix	4	16					
7	Sweden	Henrik von Eckermann	Allerdings	4	4					
7	Sweden			12	24	36			9,000 €	2
8	Belgium	Dirk Demeersman	Bufero van het Panishof	8	8					
8	Belgium	Olivier Philippaerts	Cabrio van de Heffinck	0	9					
8	Belgium	Niels Bruynseels	Conisha van de Helle	8	12					
8	Belgium	Ludo Philippaerts	Challenge van de Begijnakker	7	8					
8	Belgium			15	25	40			6,000 €	1

(grey penalties points do not count for the team result)

== Grand Prix Spécial (dressage) ==
The Grand Prix Spécial was one of the most important dressage competitions at the 2012 CHIO Aachen. A Grand Prix Spécial is the competition with the highest definite level of dressage competitions.

It was held on Saturday, July 7, 2012 at 8:30 am. The Meggle AG was the sponsor of this competition.

	Rider	Horse	Score	prize money (€)
1	(Germany) Kristina Sprehe	Desperados	81.000 %	11,000 €
2	(Germany) Helen Langehanenberg	Damon Hill NRW	80.622 %	7,000 €
3	(Austria) Victoria Max-Theurer	Augustin OLD	77.600 %	5,000 €
4	(Germany) Dorothee Schneider	Diva Royal	77.378 %	3,000 €
5	(Denmark) Nathalie of Sayn-Wittgenstein	Digby	76.622 %	2,200 €

(top 5 of 30 competitors)

== CICO 3* (eventing) ==
The CICO 3* is the official eventing competition of Germany. It was held as two-day-event. For the first time it was part of the new FEI Nation Cup eventing, it is the fourth competition of this series in 2012.

The first part of this competition, the dressage phase, was held on Friday, July 6, 2012, at 8:30 am. The second phase, the show jumping phase, was held on the same day at 5:30 pm. The final phase, the cross country phase, was held on Saturday, July 7, 2012 at 9:00 am.

The sponsor of this competition is DHL.

After dressage and show jumping the host team was in the lead, leader in the individual ranking was Laura Collett with her 13-year-old gelding Rayef. In the cross country phase Abraxxas, the horse of German team rider Ingrid Klimke had a run-out (20 penalties). The second place team (Great Britain) also had to accept some faults, British team rider Emily Baldwin had 11,60 time penalties. So the German team win third time in this FEI Nation Cup eventing season.

Team result CICO 3*

Rank	Team	Rider and horses	Penalties				Scoring points
Rank	Team	Rider and horses	Dressage	Show jumping	Cross country	Total	Scoring points
1	Germany	Sandra Auffarth; Opgun Louvo; Dirk Schrade; King Artus; Michael Jung; Leopin FST; Ingrid Klimke; FRH Butts Abraxxas	34.60 43.20 39.60 35.80	3.00 4.00 8.00 4.00	4.00 0.00 0.00 22.00	136.40; 41.60 47.20 47.60 (61.80)	11
2	Great Britain	Laura Collett; Rayef; William Fox-Pitt; Neuf des Coeurs; Francis Whittington; Sir Percival III; Emily Baldwin; Drivetime	30.20 42.60 49.80 49.80	6.00 4.00 4.00 4.00	4.40 0.00 0.00 11.60	141.00; 40.60 46.60 53.80 (61.40)	9
3	Sweden	Ludvig Svennerstål; Shamwari; Niklas Jonsson; First Lady; Hannes Melin; Gaston	40.00 46.80 47.60	12.00 14.00 12.00	0.40 0.00 4.00	176.80; 52.40 60.80 63.60	8
4	New Zealand	Andrew Nicholson; Nereo; Lucy Jackson; Kilcoltrim Ambassador; Jonathan Paget; Bullet Proof	43.60 57.60 50.40 56.20	0.00 4.00 2.00 20.00	0.00 8.40 51.60 eliminated	217.60; 43.60 70.00 104.00 (1000.00)	7
More rankings: France: 5th place Netherlands: 6th place Australia: eliminated							6 5 0

After the CICO Aachen Germany are in the lead in the FEI Nation Cup Eventing with 41 scoring points. Second is the Dutch team with 21 points, third the British and the French team (both 20 points).

Individual result CICO 3*

Rank	Rider	Horse	Team rider	Penalties			
Rank	Rider	Horse	Team rider	Dressage	Show jumping	Cross country	Total
1	(Australia) Christopher Burton	Underdiscussion	no	37.80	1.00	0.00	38.80
2	(Germany) Michael Jung	Sam FBW	no	38.00	1.00	1.60	40.60
3	(United Kingdom) Laura Collett	Rayef	yes	30.20	6.00	4.00	(Note: Third rank because of a worse cross country result than Michael Jung.) 40.60
4	(Germany) Sandra Auffarth	Opgun Louvo	yes	34.60	3.00	4.00	41.60
5	(New Zealand) Andrew Nicholson	Nereo	yes	43.60	0.00	0.00	43.60

== Combined individual classification (four-in-hand-driving) ==
The combined individual classification was held separated from the team competition. Only the marathon phase was held together with the team competition.

The first part of this competition, the driven dressage, was held on Wednesday, July 4, 2012 at 1:00 pm. The second competition, the obstacle cone driving, was held on Friday, July 6, 2012 at 9:15 pm. The final phase, the marathon, was held on Saturday, July 7, 2012 at 2:00 pm.

	Driver	driven dressage score	marathon score	obstacle cone driving score	Total score	prize money (€)
1	(Australia) Boyd Exell	44.93	91.07	3.49	139,49	5,000 €
2	(Netherlands) Koos de Ronde	51.46	100.13	0.00	151.59	3,000 €
3	(Germany) Christoph Sandmann	45.18	105.71	0.75	151.64	2,250 €
4	(Netherlands) Theo Timmerman	44.80	101.58	6.14	152.52	1,500 €
5	(Germany) Georg von Stein	52.99	99.93	0.00	152.92	750 €
6	(Switzerland) Werner Ulrich	55.30	101.08	3.00	159.38	500 €
7	(Hungary) Jozsef Dobrovitz	52.86	111.34	0.56	164.76	280 €
8	(Germany) Michael Brauchle	66.18	98.28	3.00	167.47	220 €
9	(Sweden) Fredrik Persson	54.14	109.44	6.00	169.58	150 €
10	(United States) Chester Weber	33.54	134.05	3.00	170.59	150 €

(top 10 of 24 competitors)

== Best of Champions ==
The "Best of Champions" was a show jumping competition with two rounds. The height of the fences was up to 1.50 meters. It was held on Saturday, July 7, 2012 at 8:30 pm.

Since 2011 the best six women and the best six men in the FEI World Ranking have the permission to start in this competition. Also the best placed German men and women in the World Ranking can start in this competition. The first round of this competition was a qualifying round, the best six rider of this round can start in the second round. The winner was the rider with the lowest number of penalties and the fastest time in the second round.

	Rider	Horse	Round 1	Round 2		prize money
	Rider	Horse	Penalties	Penalties	Time (s)	prize money
1	(Germany) Marcus Ehning	Noltes Küchengirl	4	0	47.50	11,000 €
2	(Switzerland) Pius Schwizer	Verdi III	0	0	47.90	7,000 €
3	(Germany) Marco Kutscher	Satisfaction FRH	0	0	49.43	5,500 €
4	(United States) Laura Kraut	Belmont	1	4	49.94	4,000 €
5	(Sweden) Rolf-Göran Bengtsson	Ninja	0	4	57.60	3,000 €

(Top 5 of 12 Competitors)

== Grand Prix Freestyle (dressage) ==
The Grand Prix Freestyle (or Grand Prix Kür), also called the "Großer Dressurpreis von Aachen" (Grand dressage price of Aachen) will be the final competition of the CDIO 5* at the 2012 CHIO Aachen.

A Grand Prix Freestyle is a Freestyle dressage competition. The level of this competition is at least the level of a Grand Prix de Dressage, but it can be higher than the level of a Grand Prix Spécial.

The Grand Prix Freestyle at the CDIO 5* (2012 CHIO Aachen) will be held on Sunday, July 8, 2012 at 10:00 am. The Deutsche Bank is the sponsor of this competition.

	Rider	Horse	Score	prize money (€)
1	(Germany) Helen Langehanenberg	Damon Hill NRW	85.150 %	43,000 €
2	(Germany) Kristina Sprehe	Desperados	84.700 %	26,000 €
3	(Germany) Dorothee Schneider	Diva Royal	81.100 %	20,000 €
4	(Austria) Victoria Max-Theurer	Augustin OLD	80.975 %	13,000 €
5	(Denmark) Nathalie of Sayn-Wittgenstein	Digby	79.750 %	7,000 €

(top 5 of 15 competitors)

== Nations Cup of Germany (four-in-hand-driving) ==
The four-in-hand-driving Nations Cup was the official four-in-hand-driving competition of Germany.

The first part of this competition, the driven dressage, was held on Thursday, May 5, 2012 at 10:00 am. The second competition, the marathon, was held on Saturday, July 7, 2012 at 2:20 pm. The final phase, the obstacle cone driving, was held on Sunday, July 8, 2012 at 10:00 am. Sixth time in a row the Dutch team win this competition.

	Team	Driver	driven dressage score	marathon score	obstacle cone driving score	Total score	prize money (€)
1	Netherlands	IJsbrand Chardon	36.99	131.93	3.00		
1	Netherlands	Koos de Ronde	53.12	100.13	5.99		
1	Netherlands	Theo Timmerman	43.39	101.58	1.44		
1	Netherlands					286.53	5,600 €
2	Germany	Michael Brauchle	56.19	98.28	10.15		
2	Germany	Christoph Sandmann	42.75	105.71	0.00		
2	Germany	Georg von Stein	53.63	99.93	12.00		
2	Germany					304.74	3,500 €
3	Sweden	Tomas Eriksson	54.40	105.04	7.04		
3	Sweden	Axel Olin	62.98	150.98	6.47		
3	Sweden	Fredrik Persson	49.66	109.44	0.00		
3	Sweden					325.01	2,500 €
4	Switzerland	Toni Stofer	66.94	143.11	22.94		
4	Switzerland	Werner Ulrich	55.68	101.08	6.82		
4	Switzerland	Daniel Würgler	60.16	122.35	9.03		
4	Switzerland					355.12	2,000 €
4	Hungary	Jozsef Dobrovitz	53.50	111.34	11.35		
4	Hungary	Jozsef Dobrovitz junior	57.86	eliminated	6.00		
4	Hungary	Zoltán Lazar	55.68	112.90	15.74		
4	Hungary					360.51	1,800 €
6	Belgium	Felix Marie Brasseur	60.80	124.13	7.56		
6	Belgium	Glenn Geerts	68.61	113.20	14.39		
6	Belgium	Gert Schrijvers	60.16	116.43	23.59		
6	Belgium					372.54	1,600 €
ELI	Australia	Boyd Exell	33.54	91.07	6.00		
ELI	Australia	Gavin Robson	56.45	230.77	eliminated		
ELI	Australia					eliminated	

(grey penalties points do not count for the team result)

== Großer Preis von Aachen (show jumping) ==
The "Großer Preis von Aachen", the show jumping Grand Prix of Aachen, was the mayor show jumping competition of the 2012 CHIO Aachen. It was held on Sunday, July 8, 2012 at 2:00 pm. The competition was a show jumping competition with two round and one jump-off, the height of the fences were up to 1.60 meters. The first round of this competition was a qualifying round, the best 18 rider of this round was qualified for the second round. The winner was the rider with the lowest number of penalties and the fastest time in the jump-off.

The main sponsor of the "Großer Preis von Aachen" is Rolex. The Grand Prix was endowed with 350,000 €.

	Rider	Horse	Round 1	Round 2		Jump-off		prize money
	Rider	Horse	Round 1	Penalties	Time (s)	Penalties	Time (s)	prize money
1	(United Kingdom) Michael Whitaker	Amai	0	0		0	49.73	110,000 €
2	(Germany) Thomas Voß	Carinjo	0	0		0	54.37	75,000 €
3	(Germany) Meredith Michaels-Beerbaum	Bella Donna	0	0		4	56.96	50,000 €
4	(Germany) Hans-Dieter Dreher	Embassy II	4	4	73.61			28,000 €
5	(Germany) Christian Ahlmann	Taloubet Z	4	4	74.68			19,000 €

(Top 5 of 40 Competitors)

== Sport farewell ==
At the first CHIO weekend, Kai Vorberg, one of the most successful vaulter ever say goodbye. With 30 years he ended his career as an active athlete. Now he will be the lunger for other vaulters. He will also support the German vaulting national coach Ulla Ramge.

== Television / Live Video ==
The German TV stations (WDR, ARD and ZDF) had broadcast more than 16 hours from the 2012 CHIO Aachen, most of them live. Across Europe Eurosport broadcast at two Wednesdays, in total two hour summary programme of the 2012 CHIO Aachen (Show jumping nations cup and show jumping Grand Prix).

Much of the competition are streamed live by the German IPTV-channel ClipMyHorse.
