= Philippaerts =

Philippaerts is an originally Flemish given name and may refer to:

- David Philippaerts (born 1983), Italian Grand Prix motocross world champion
- Ludo Philippaerts (born 1963), Belgian show jumping rider
- Nicola Philippaerts and Olivier Philippaerts (born 1993), twin sons of Ludo, both Belgian show jumping rider as well
