= Concours de Dressage International =

Competition rating for international dressage events

Concours de Dressage International (CDI) is the competition rating for international dressage events. The rating is given by the equestrian governing body FEI.

A CDI is divided from one to five stars. The height of the star depends on the class in which the rider competes and the prize money.

- CDI5*: Big Tour (Minimum of prizemoney €72'200, no maximum)
- CDI4*: Big Tour (Minimum of prizemoney €19'200 and maximum of prizemoney €71'099)
- CDI3*: Big Tour (Maximum of prizemoney €19'199, no minimum)
- CDI2*: Medium Tour (No minimum nor maximum prizemoney)
- CDI1*: Small Tour (No minimum nor maximum prizemoney)

To be able to organize a CDI5* you must first have organized a CDI4*. Only when a positive report has been released on the CDI4* by the Foreign Judge can a CDI5* be organized.

== Other sections ==
- CDI-W: International World Cup competition or a WC qualifier in Grand Prix.
- CDIAm: International amateurs class
- CDIYH: International Young Horse class divided into 5 years old, 6 years old, and 7 years old horses.
- CDIU25: An international class for Grand Prix riders under the age of 25
- CDIY: An international class for Young Riders between the age of 18 and 21
- CDIJ: An international class for Juniors between the age of 16 and 18
- CDICh-A/B: An international class for Children between the age of 12 and 14 in which the rider can decide to ride on E-ponies and horses. This class is for children who already want to start in a horse division class.
- CDIP: An international class for Pony riders between the age of 12 and 16

== Nations Cup ==
A CDI can also be organized as a Nations Cup, well known as a Concours de Dressage International Officiele (CDIO). The CDIO rating is divided between a CDIO2*, CDIO3*, CDIO4*, and CDIO5*. There are currently eight Nations Cup competitions:

Show	Class
CHIO Aachen (Germany)	CDIO5*
CHIO Rotterdam (Netherlands)	CDIO4*
Falsterbo Horse Show (Sweden)	CDIO5*
CDI Budapest Pilisjaszfalu (Hungary)	CDIO3*
Compiègne Equestre (France)	CDIO5*
Global Dressage Festival, Wellington FL (United States)	CDIO3*

Former Dressage Nations Cup shows

Show	Class
CDI Aarhus, Vilhelmsborg (Denmark)	CDIO2*
CDI Lipica (Slovenia)	CDIO2*
CDI Kiyv (Ukraine)	CDIO3*
Grande Semaine de Saumur (France)	CDIO2*
CDIO Kristiansand (Norway)	CDIO3*
CDIO Taipei (Chinese Taipei)	CDIO2*
CDIO Mondorf less Bains (Luxembourg)	CDIO3*
All England Jumping Course at Hickstead (United Kingdom)	CDIO3*
Domaine Equestre Vidauban (France)	CDIO3*
Equitour Denmark, Uggerhalne	CDIO4*
Nordic Horse Show, Drammen (Norway)	CDIO3*
CDI Helsinki (Finland)	CDIO3*
Hamina Horse Show (Finland)	CDIO3*
Equitour Aalborg (Denmark)	CDIO3*
CDIO Hagen (Germany)	CDIO5*
Odense Horse Show (Denmark)	CDIO3*
CDI Ypäjä (Finland)	CDIO3*
CSI Twente, Geesteren (Netherlands)	CDIO3*
Järvenpää Horse Show (Finland)	CDIO4*

In the youth classes, there is also a Nations Cup. This exists of the CDIOU25, CDIOY, CDIOJ, CDIOP, and CDIOCh.

== Prestigious shows ==
There are several major competitions that have the prestigious 5 * status. The best riders and horses come together at these competitions.

Shows as Aachen, München-Riem and Frankfurt (Germany), Rotterdam (Netherlands), Falsterbo (Sweden), Doha (Qatar), Herning (Denmark), Wellington (USA), Geneva (Switzerland) and Compiegne (France) are prestigious CDI5* shows.
