= 2012 CHIO Rotterdam =

The 2011 CHIO Rotterdam was the 2012 edition of the CHIO Rotterdam, the Dutch official show jumping horse show. It was held as CSIO 5* in show jumping, CDIO 3* and CDI 3* in dressage.

The first (national) horse show were held in1937, Rotterdam and in 1948 it became an international horse show.

== Nations Cup of the Netherlands (dressage) ==
The 2012 dressage Nations Cup of the Netherlands was part of the 2012 CHIO Rotterdam horse show. Teams of eight nations took part in this competition. The competition was held at June 20 (9:00 am to 12:00 noon) and June 21, 2012 (08:30 am to 1:30 pm).

=== Team result ===
The team ranking of this competition was endowed with 27,000 €.

	Team	Rider	Horse	Score	Prize money
1	Netherlands	Hans Peter Minderhoud	Tango	72.000 %	
1	Netherlands	Imke Schellekens-Bartels	Toots	73.489 %	
1	Netherlands	Anky van Grunsven	Salinero	78.480 %	
1	Netherlands	Edward Gal	Undercover	74.085 %	
1	Netherlands			73.660 %	9,000 €
2	Sweden	Minna Telde	Santana	70.511 %	
2	Sweden	Rose Mathisen	Bocelli	67.128 %	
2	Sweden	Tinne Vilhelmson-Silfvén	Don Auriello	75.830 %	
2	Sweden	Patrik Kittel	Watermill Scandic	70.000 %	
2	Sweden			72.113 %	7,000 €
3	Belgium	Philippe Jorissen	Le Beau	71.043 %	
3	Belgium	Vicky Smits-Vanderhasselt	Daianira van de Helle	71.362 %	
3	Belgium	Claudia Fassaert	Donnerfee	71.872 %	
3	Belgium			71.426 %	5,000 €
4	Denmark	Anne van Olst	Taikoen	70.426 %	
4	Denmark	Lone Jørgensen	De Vito	69.234 %	
4	Denmark	Lisbeth Seierskilde	Raneur	71.404 %	
4	Denmark			70.355 %	3,000 €
5	Spain	Ignacio Rambla	Fogonero IX	68.447 %	
5	Spain	Jose Daniel Martin Dockx	Grandioso	68.702 %	
5	Spain	Morgan Barbançon	Painted Black	73.660 %	
5	Spain			70.270 %	2,000 €
6	Germany	Anja Plönzke	Le Mont d'Or	69.809 %	
6	Germany	Uta Gräf	Le Noir	70.085 %	
6	Germany	Hubertus Schmidt	Lento	70.021 %	
6	Germany			69.972 %	1,000 €
7	Great Britain	Gareth Hughes	Stenkjers Nadonna	67.362 %	
7	Great Britain	Nikki Crisp	Pasoa	64.234 %	
7	Great Britain	Michael Eilberg	Half Moon Delphi	69.851 %	
7	Great Britain	Emile Faurie	Marquis	67.149 %	
7	Great Britain			68.121 %	
8	Switzerland	Elisabeth Eversfield-Koch	Rokoko N	67.681 %	
8	Switzerland	Jeannine Zuber	Wesergesit	62.383 %	
8	Switzerland	Hans Staub	Warbeau	66.511 %	
8	Switzerland			65.525 %	

(grey penalties points do not count for the team result)

=== Individual results ===
	Rider	Horse	Score
1	(Sweden) Tinne Vilhelmson-Silfvén	Don Auriello	75.830 %
2	(Netherlands) Edward Gal	Undercover	74.085 %
3	(Spain) Morgan Barbançon	Painted Black	73.660 %
4	(Netherlands) Imke Schellekens-Bartels	Toots	73.489 %
5	(Netherlands) Anky van Grunsven	Salinero	78.480 %

== FEI Nations Cup of the Netherlands (show jumping) ==
The 2012 FEI Nations Cup of the Netherlands was part of the 2012 CHIO Rotterdam. It was the fourth competition of the 2012 FEI Nations Cup.

The 2012 FEI Nations Cup of the Netherlands was held at Friday, June 22, 2012 at 5:15 pm. The competing teams were: the Netherlands, Germany, the Switzerland, Belgium, France, Great Britain, Sweden and Ireland. The competition was a show jumping competition with two rounds and optionally one jump-off. The height of the fences were up to 1.60 meters.

The competition was endowed with 200,000 €.

	Team	Rider	Horse	Round A	Round B	Total penalties	Jump-off		Prize money	Scoring points
	Team	Rider	Horse	Penalties	Penalties	Total penalties	Penalties	Time (s)	Prize money	Scoring points
1	Germany	Marcus Ehning	Copin van de Broy	9	4					
1	Germany	Ludger Beerbaum	Gotha FRH	0	1					
1	Germany	Philipp Weishaupt	Monte Bellini	1	0					
1	Germany	Marco Kutscher	Cornet Obolensky	1	1					
1	Germany			2	2	4			64,000 €	10
2	Sweden	Jens Fredricson	Lunatic	4	0					
2	Sweden	Malin Baryard-Johnsson	Tornesch	0	0					
2	Sweden	Rolf-Göran Bengtsson	Carusso	1	0					
2	Sweden	Henrik von Eckermann	Allerdings	8	0					
2	Sweden			5	0	5			40,000 €	7
3	France	Patrice Delaveau	Orient Express	1	0					
3	France	Eugénie Angot	Old Chap Tame	9	1					
3	France	Pénélope Leprevost	Mylord Carthago	5	8					
3	France	Kevin Staut	Silvana	4	0					
3	France			10	0	10			32,000 €	6
4	Ireland	Cian O'Connor	Blue Loyd	5	0					
4	Ireland	Jessica Kürten	Voss	5	8					
4	Ireland	Clement McMahon	Pacino	1	4					
4	Ireland	Denis Lynch	Abbervail van het Dingeshof	4	1					
4	Ireland			10	5	15			24,000 €	5
5	Switzerland	Paul Estermann	Castlefield Eclipse	0	0					
5	Switzerland	Claudia Gisler	Touchable	11	8					
5	Switzerland	Janika Sprunger	Palloubet D'Halong	9	0					
5	Switzerland	Steve Guerdat	Nino des Buissonnets	4	4					
5	Switzerland			13	4	17			16,000 €	4
6	Great Britain	Tim Stockdale	Kalico Bay	17	8					
6	Great Britain	Tina Fletcher	Hello Sailor	5	5					
6	Great Britain	Scott Brash	Hello Sanctos	4	0					
6	Great Britain	Peter Charles	Vindicat W	0	4					
6	Great Britain			9	9	18			11,000 €	3
7	Netherlands	Jur Vrieling	Bubalou	5	0					
7	Netherlands	Maikel van der Vleuten	Verdi	4	8					
7	Netherlands	Jeroen Dubbeldam	Utascha	4	17					
7	Netherlands	Gerco Schröder	London	4	4					
7	Netherlands			9	12	21			8,000 €	2
8	Belgium	Ludo Philippaerts	Challenge van de Begijnakker	0	8					
8	Belgium	Rik Hemeryck	Quarco de Kerambars	19	13					
8	Belgium	Nicola Philippaerts	Carlos V.H.P.Z.	4	9					
8	Belgium	Jos Lansink	Valentina	9	5					
8	Belgium			13	22	35			5,000 €	1

(grey penalties points do not count for the team result)

== Grand Prix Spécial ==
At Friday Afternoon a Grand Prix Spécial was held as one competition of the CDIO 3*. 15 Riders with their horses started in this competition. The Grand Prix Spécial was endowed with 7,000 €.

	Rider	Horse	Score	Prize money
1	(Sweden) Patrik Kittel	Watermill Scandic	74.289 %	2000 €
2	(Denmark) Anne van Olst	Taikoen	73.733 %	1600 €
3	(United Kingdom) Michael Eilberg	Half Moon Delphi	71.778 %	1200 €
4	(Finland) Terhi Stegars	Axis TSF	69.333 %	800 €
5	(Germany) Uta Gräf	Le Noir	68.756 %	500 €

== Grand Prix Freestyle ==
The InterChem prijs, the Grand Prix Freestyle (or Grand Prix Kür) of the 2012 CHIO Rotterdam, was the final competition of the CDIO 3* at the 2012 CHIO Rotterdam. InterChem was the sponsor of this competition.

The competition was held at Saturday, June 23, 2012 at 8:00 pm.

	Rider	Horse	Score	
1	(Sweden) Tinne Vilhelmson-Silfvén	Don Auriello	78.450 %	12,000 €
2	(Netherlands) Anky van Grunsven	Salinero	78.400 %	10,000 €
3	(Netherlands) Imke Schellekens-Bartels	Toots	77.750 %	8000 €
4	(Netherlands) Edward Gal	Undercover	77.300 %	6000 €
5	(Spain) Morgan Barbançon	Painted Black	77.025 %	4000 €

== Longines Grand Prix Port of Rotterdam ==
The Grand Prix was the mayor show jumping competition of the 2012 CHIO Rotterdam. The sponsor of this competition was Longines. It was held at Sunday, June 24, 2012 at 2:30 pm. The competition was a show jumping competition with one round and one jump-off, the height of the fences were up to 1.60 meters.

	Rider	Horse	Round 1	jump-off		prize money
	Rider	Horse	Penalties	Penalties	Time (s)	prize money
1	(Netherlands) Marc Houtzager	Tamino	0	0	30.51	50,000 €
2	(United States) Laura Kraut	Cedric	0	0	30.55	40,000 €
3	(France) Simon Delestre	Napoli du Ry	0	0	30.61	30,000 €
4	(Netherlands) Jur Vrieling	Bubalu	0	0	30.72	20,000 €
5	(Republic of Ireland) Denis Lynch	Lantinus	0	0	30.83	14,000 €

(Top 5 of 50 Competitors)
