= Hendrik Snoek =

Equestrian and businessman

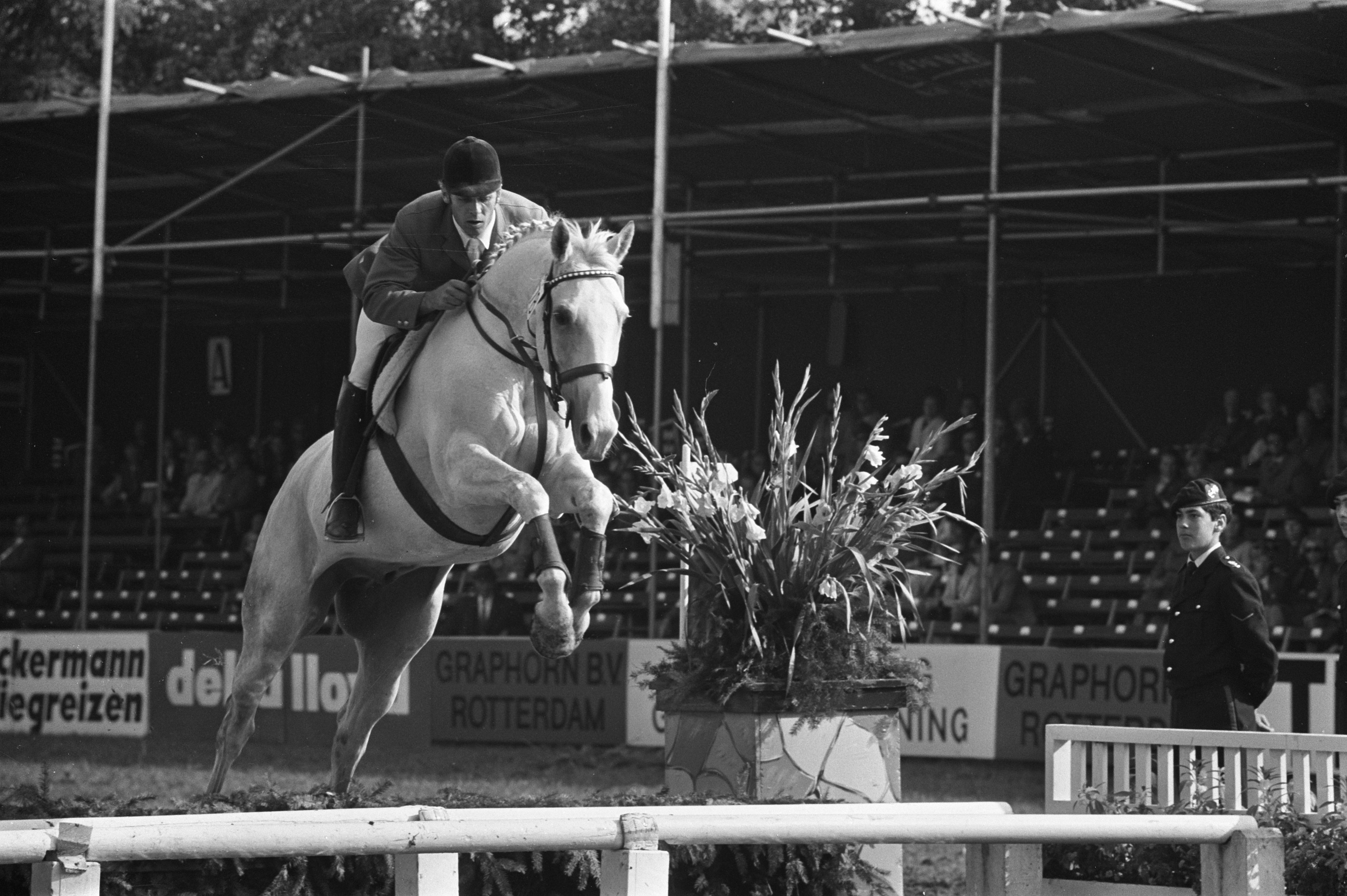
Hendrik Snoek at 1972 CHIO Rotterdam

Hendrik Snoek is a former German show jumper who later became a businessman. Snoek was heir to a supermarket fortune.

== Kidnapping ==
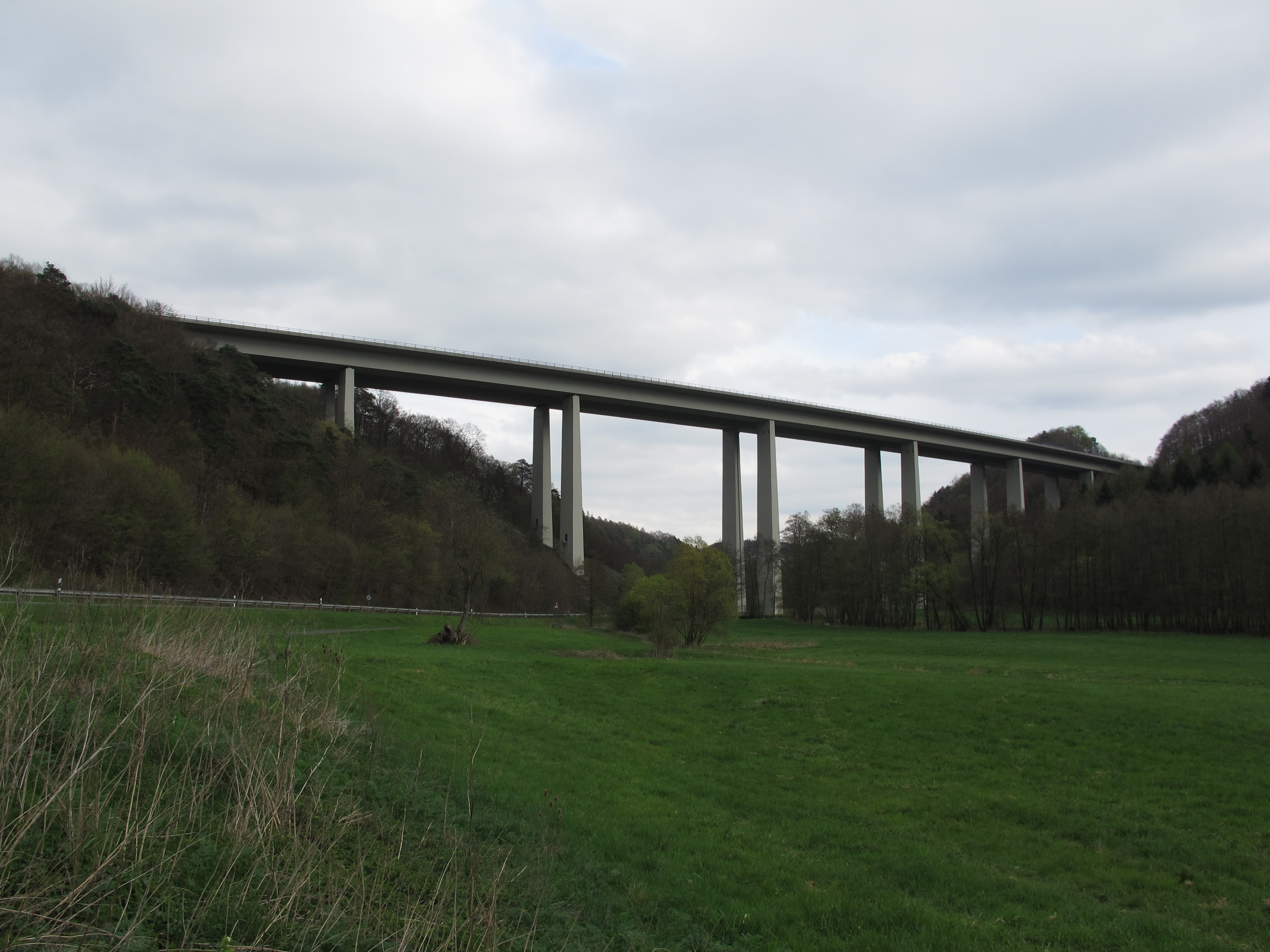
View of the Ambachtalbrücke from the valley

He was kidnapped on 3 November 1976 and held for a DM 5,000,000 ransom. He was discovered by a lorry driver, chained up in service room in a pillar of a 52 meter high road bridge, the Ambachtalbrücke near Herborn over the A45, after the ransom was paid by his father. A considerable amount of the ransom was eventually recovered.

== Westphalian Horse Museum ==
He was a founder of the Westphalian Horse Museum in Münster.

== Show jumping ==
Snoek won the 1972 Hickstead Derby on Shirokko. He was a reserve at the 1976 Summer Olympics for West Germany. He won the R.D.S. Dublin Grand Prix in 1984 riding the chestnut mare Palma Nova.
