= Horse Museum =

Horse Museum may refer to:

- Living Museum of the Horse, France
- Fort Garry Horse Museum & Archives,
- Westphalian Horse Museum, Germany
- Horse Museum (Dr. Seuss), children's book
- Horse Museum (Lithuania), an agricultural ethnographic museum in Lithuania

== See also ==
- Category:Equestrian museums
