= 2012 Piazza di Siena =

The 2012 Piazza di Siena – CSIO Rome was the 2012 edition of the CSIO Rome, the Italian official show jumping horse show, at the Piazza di Siena in Rome. It was held as CSIO 5*.

In 2012 the Piazza di Siena horse show celebrates its 80th anniversary. In 1922, the first horse show were held at the Piazza di Siena. Since the year 1926 it is an international horse show. Two years later, in 1928, the horse show was first time the location of the Italian official show jumping horse show (CSIO = Concours de Saut International Officiel).

The 2012 edition of the CSIO Rome was held between May 24, 2012 and May 27, 2012. Main sponsor of the 2012 Piazza di Siena horse show was Fixdesign.

== FEI Nations Cup of Italy ==
The 2012 FEI Nations Cup of Italy is part of the 2012 Piazza di Siena horse show. It was the second competition of the 2012 FEI Nations Cup and was held at Friday, May 25, 2012 at 3:15 pm. The competing teams were: Belgium, the Netherlands, Switzerland, Ireland, Sweden, Great Britain, Germany and France. Also an Italian team as host nation had the chance to start in the competition.

The competition was a show jumping competition with two rounds and optionally one jump-off. The height of the fences were up to 1.60 meters. All teams were allowed to start in the second round. The competition is endowed with 200,000 €.

Winner of the competition was the German team. It was the first victory of Germany in the Italian Nations Cup since 2000. Before this a German team had won in Rome in 1931, 1932, 1933, 1940, 1958, 1971 and 1993.

	Team	Rider	Horse	Round A	Round B	Total penalties	Jump-off		Prize money	scoring points
	Team	Rider	Horse	Penalties	Penalties	Total penalties	Penalties	Time (s)	Prize money	scoring points
1	Germany	Marco Kutscher	Cornet Obolensky	0	4					
1	Germany	Christian Ahlmann	Taloubet Z	4	0					
1	Germany	Marcus Ehning	Copin van de Broy	0	0					
1	Germany	Ludger Beerbaum	Gotha FRH	0	did not start					
1	Germany			0	4	4			64.000 €	10
2	Switzerland	Paul Estermann	Castlefield Eclipse	0	0					
2	Switzerland	Janika Sprunger	Uptown Boy	4	8					
2	Switzerland	Simone Wettstein	Cash and Go	4	0					
2	Switzerland	Clarissa Crotta	West Side van Meerputhoeve	4	0					
2	Switzerland			8	0	8			40.000 €	7
3	Belgium	Ludo Philippaerts	Challenge van de Begijnakker	0	22					
3	Belgium	Olivier Philippaerts	Cabrio van de Heffnink	0	4					
3	Belgium	Nicola Philippaerts	Carlos V.H.P.Z.	12	4					
3	Belgium	Jos Lansink	Valentina	4	0					
3	Belgium			4	8	12			32.000 €	6
4	Italy	Juan Carlos Garcia	Bonzai van de Warande	8	0					
4	Italy	Francesca Capponi	Stallone	0	0					
4	Italy	Luca Marziani	Wivina	12	4					
4	Italy	Natale Chiaudani	Almero	4	4					
4	Italy			12	4	16			23.000 €	-
5	France	Patrice Delaveau	Ornella Mail	4	16					
5	France	Marc Dilasser	Obiwan de Piliere	4	4					
5	France	Roger-Yves Bost	Nippon d'Elle	0	8					
5	France	Kevin Staut	Silvana	12	0					
5	France			8	12	20			15.000 €	5
6	Netherlands	Harry Smolders	Regina Z	4	4					
6	Netherlands	Marc Houtzager	Voltaire	4	8					
6	Netherlands	Jur Vrieling	Bubalou	0	8					
6	Netherlands	Gerco Schröder	New Orleans	4	4					
6	Netherlands			8	16	24			8,500 €	3,5
6	Great Britain	William Funnell	Billy Angelo	9	12					
6	Great Britain	Tina Fletcher	Hello Sailor	4	4					
6	Great Britain	Scott Brash	Sanctos	0	0					
6	Great Britain	Peter Charles	Vindicat	4	12					
6	Great Britain			8	16	24			8.500 €	3,5
8	Sweden	Helena Persson	Bonzai H	12	12					
8	Sweden	Angelica Augustsson	Mic Mac du Tillard	0	eliminated					
8	Sweden	Lisen Bratt Fredricson	Matrix	8	4					
8	Sweden	Henrik von Eckermann	Allerdings	0	4					
8	Sweden			8	20	28			5.000 €	2
9	Ireland	Shane Sweetnam	Amaretto D'Arco	0	8					
9	Ireland	Niall Talbot	Nicos de la Censes	eliminated	did not start					
9	Ireland	Cian O'Connor	Blue Loyd	20	4					
9	Ireland	Billy Twomey	Tinka's Serenade	0	0					
9	Ireland			20	12	32			4.000 €	1

(grey penalties points do not count for the team result)

== Grand Prix “Città di Roma” ==
The Grand Prix “Città di Roma” was the major competition of the 2012 Piazza di Siena horse show. The sponsor of this competition is again Loro Piana. It is held at Sunday, May 29, 2011 at 2:15 pm.

The competition is a show jumping competition with two rounds, the height of the fences was up to 1.60 meters. It is endowed with 200,000 €.

	Rider	Horse	Round 1	Round 2		prize money
	Rider	Horse	Penalties	Penalties	Time (s)	prize money
1	(Germany) Ludger Beerbaum	Gotha FRH	0	0	43.10	50,000 €
2	(Germany) Christian Ahlmann	Taloubet Z	0	0	44.58	40,000 €
3	(France) Marc Dilasser	Obiwan de Piliere	0	0	45.10	30,000 €
4	(Germany) Marco Kutscher	Cornet Obolensky	0	0	45.59	20,000 €
5	(Switzerland) Janika Sprunger	Palloubet D'Halong	0	0	45.67	14,000 €
