= Concours Hippique International Officiel =

International-level horse show competitions

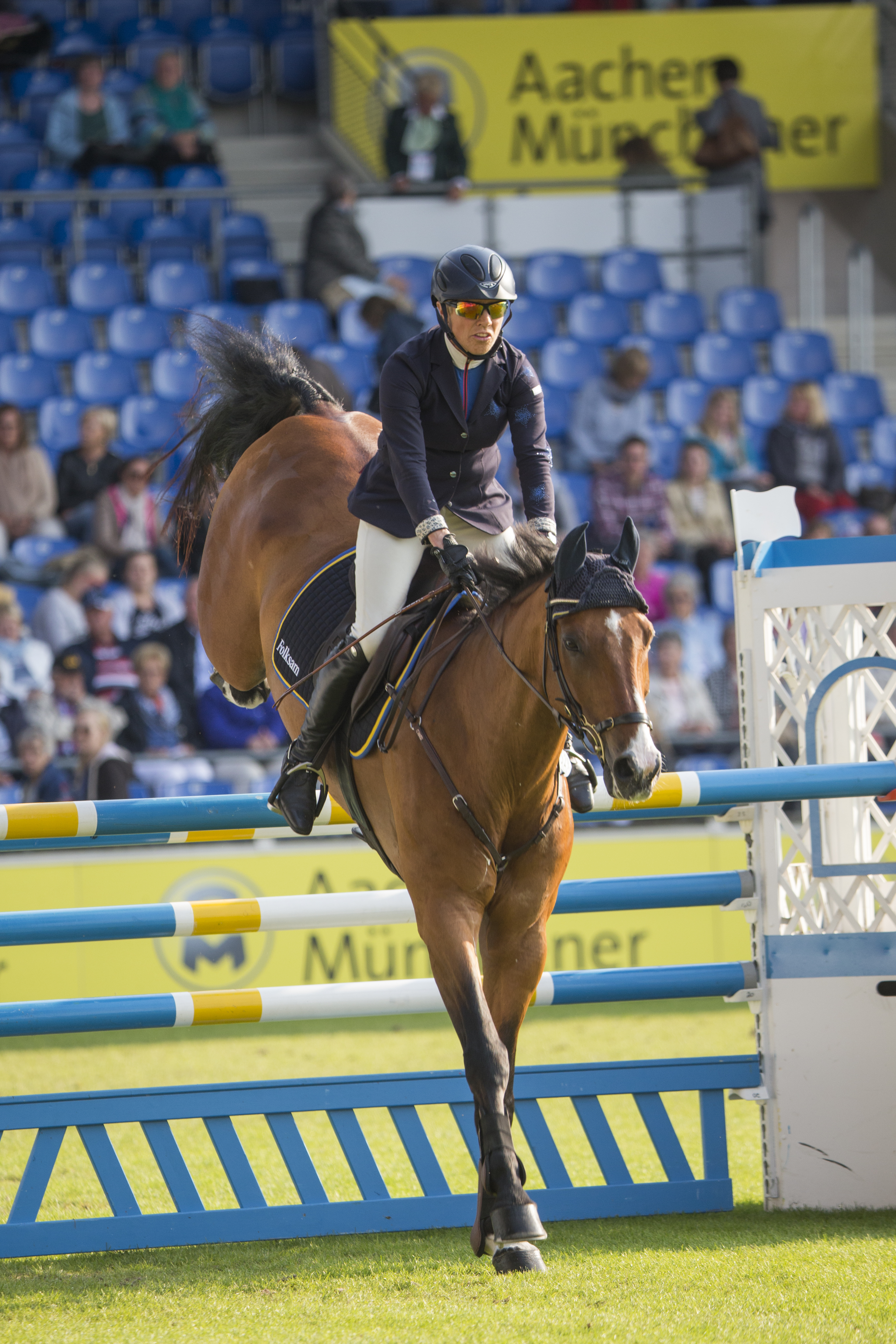
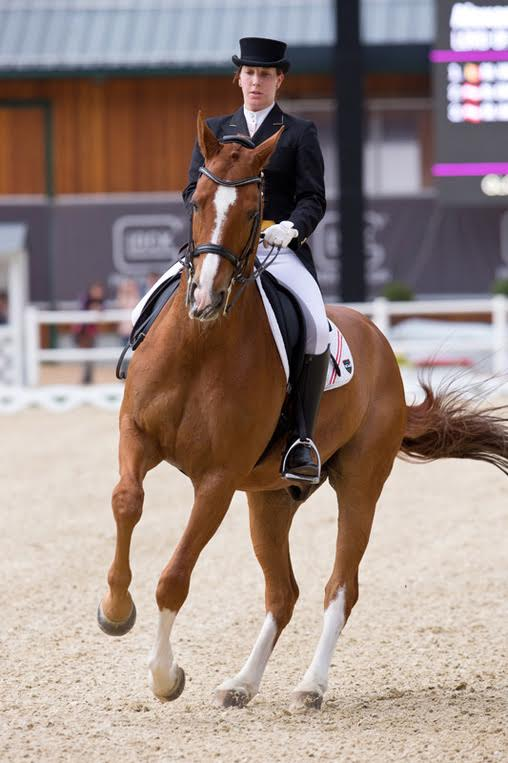
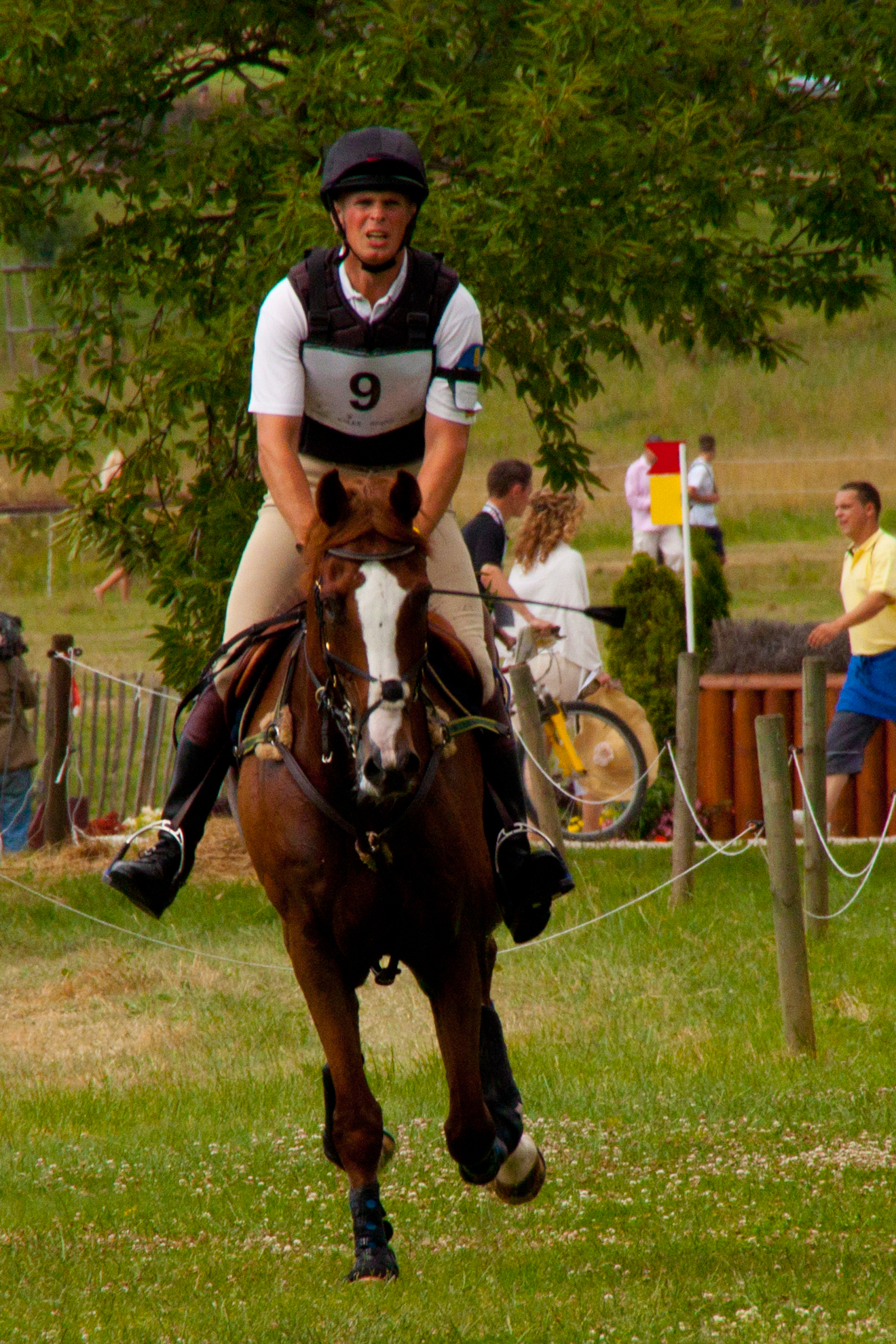
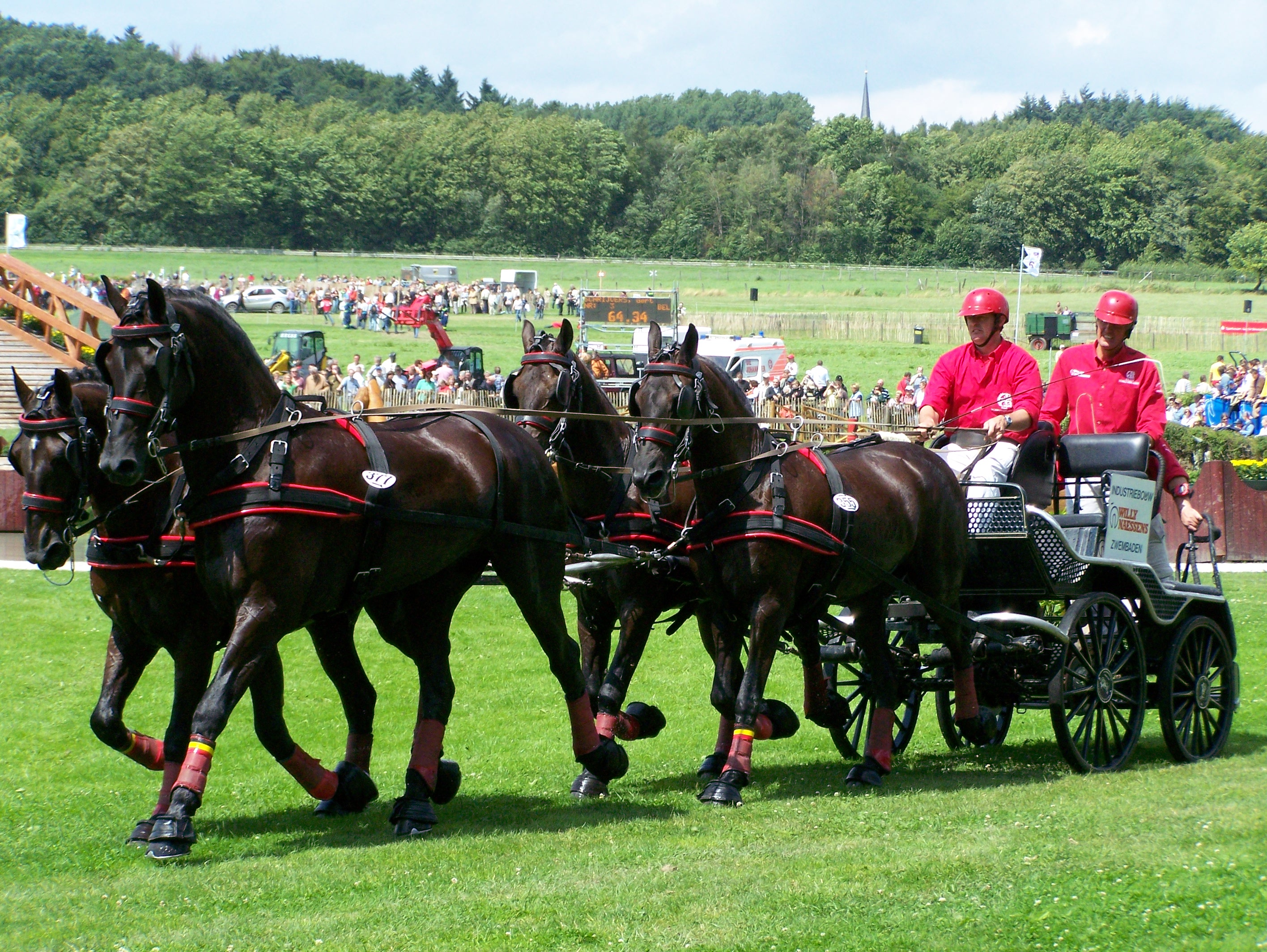
CHIO disciplines: Jumping, dressage, eventing, and driving

A Concours Hippique International Officiel (CHIO) (from French, meaning "Official International Equestrian Competition") is an FEI-sanctioned horse show with international-level competitors in equestrian sports such as show jumping, dressage, eventing, and combined driving. In a CHIO, there are individual and team competitions. Nation-teams consist of three or four riders from the same country. Only one CHIO may take place in each FEI member country per year, but not all countries have a CHIO. Two notable long-standing CHIOs are CHIO Aachen in Germany (since 1924) and CHIO Rotterdam in Netherlands, which has traditionally taken place at the Kralingse Bos since 1948.

== CHIO Aachen ==
Billed as the "World Equestrian Festival", CHIO Aachen is an international equestrian competition that has taken place since the 1920s. It is a 10-day horse show for top-level horses and riders from around the world competing in multiple disciplines. It is held in Aachen, Germany at the 40,000 spectator capacity stadium Hauptstadion in the Soers Sports Park complex. The event is popular in Europe for its Grand Prix show jumping and dressage. In addition to the competitions, there is an extensive trade fair, food, and parties. The event ends with a grand finale called the "Farewell of Nations".

== CHIO Rotterdam ==
From its early start of a riding school horse show in 1937, and its relaunch after World War II in 1947, CHIO Rotterdam quickly grew into an international-level equestrian competition. Since 1948, the event has been held at the Kralingse Bos and its biggest draw is the show jumping and dressage competitions. It is one of the top three hospitality events in the Netherlands.

== See also ==
- Concours de Saut International – Ranking system for show jumping competitions (CSIO)
