= Aachen Open Air Pop Festival =

German rock festival

- Genre: Rock, pop
- Dates: 10–12 July 1970
- Locations: Aachen, West Germany
- Years active: 1970
- Attendance: ≥ 30,000

The Aachen Open Air Pop Festival was a rock festival held at Hauptstadion in Aachen, West Germany, on 10–12 July 1970. The "Soersfestival", as it is commonly called, was the initiative of three local students: Golo Goldschmitt, Walter Reiff, and Karl-August Hohmann in particular. As there were many hippies and freaks to be expected from all over Europe, the organisers had to tackle considerable difficulties and hostilities to crack on with the idea. Between 30,000 and 40,000 visitors attended. The festival was well-organised, the weather was fine and no real problems occurred in spite of a massive and intimidating cop presence. Coca-Cola was the main investor, along with some local entrepreneurs. Tickets cost DM 15,- , or DM 40,- for three days. Artists who ultimately declined invitations, included Ginger Baker's Air Force, Canned Heat, Donovan, Fat Mattress, John Lennon & the Plastic Ono Band, John Mayall, Rhinoceros, The Rolling Stones and Soft Machine.

== Acts ==
Friday, July 10:

- Traffic (advertised, but did not appear)
- Deep Purple
- Free
- If
- Quintessence
- Livin' Blues
- Principal Edwards Magic Theatre
- Cuby + Blizzards (advertised, but did not appear)
- Golden Earring
- Spencer Davis & Alun Davies

Saturday, July 11:

- Edgar Broughton Band
- Taste
- Keef Hartley
- Caravan
- Can
- Kevin Ayers and the Whole World
- Mungo Jerry
- Kraftwerk

Sunday, July 12:

- Pink Floyd
- Fairport Convention (advertised, but did not appear)
- Van der Graaf Generator (cancelled for finishing time)
- Hardin & York
- Amon Düül II
- Tyrannosaurus Rex
- Krokodil
- Raw Material
- Champion Jack Dupree

== See also ==
- List of historic rock festivals
- List of music festivals
