= CHIO Aachen =

Annual horse show in Aachen, Germany

Coordinates: 50.7957°N 6.0942°E

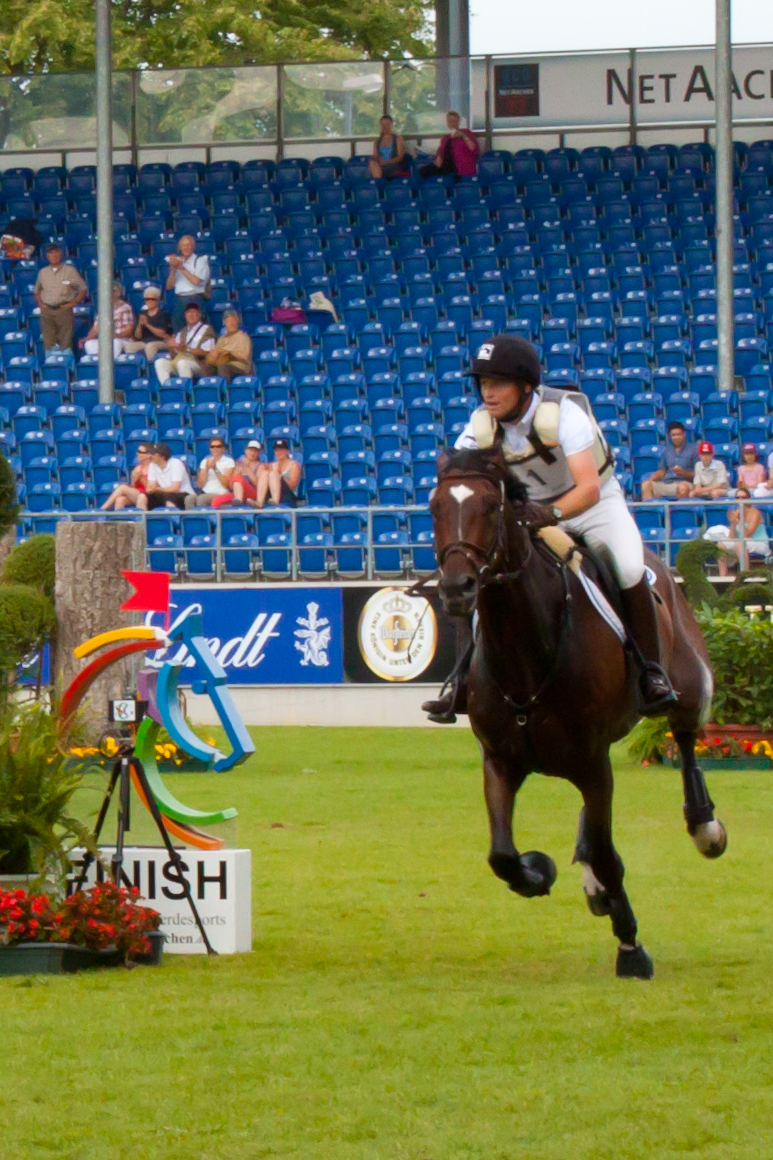
Eventing at the 2010 CHIO Aachen

The CHIO Aachen is a Concours Hippique International Officiel held in Aachen, Germany, each summer. It is the biggest Equestrian sporting event in the world.

== The event ==
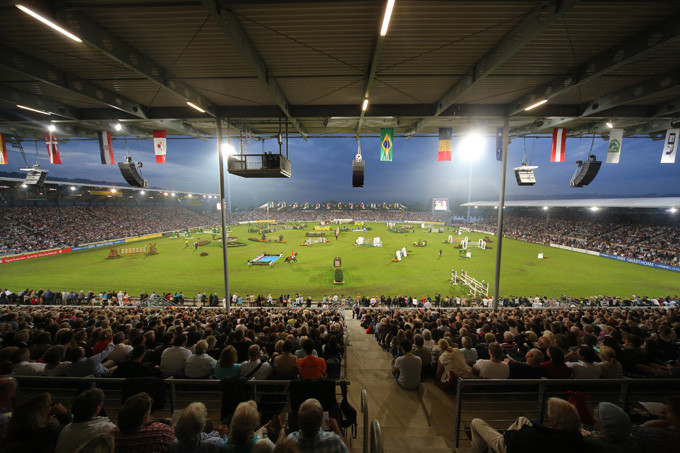
CHIO Aachen main stadium

Competitions in show jumping, dressage, eventing, four-in-hand driving, and vaulting are held at the CHIO Aachen.

According to the rules of the International Federation for Equestrian Sports (FEI), each country may only stage one Nations Cup event in each horse sport discipline. In Germany, the Nations Cup events in show jumping, dressage, eventing and four-in-hand driving are held at the CHIO (Concours Hippique International Officiel, Nations Cup event in different disciplines) in Aachen. Also a vaulting nations competition are held here. Its organizer is the Aachen-Laurensberger Rennverein society, which was founded in 1898.

The CHIO Aachen is the most prestigious horse show in Europe when it comes to show jumping and dressage. In addition to the title and following the nomenclature for the tournament, the CHIO has been held under the self-chosen name "Weltfest des Pferdesports" (World Equestrian Festival) since 1992.

== History ==
The first horse show was held 1924 in Aachen, together with a horse race. In 1927 the horse show lasted six days. The first show jumping nations cup was held in 1929. From 1940 to 1946 the event was not held because of the Second World War. Also in 1986 no horse show was held because of the Show Jumping Championship in Aachen.

The CHIO Aachen and the World Equestrian Games were both held in Aachen in 2006. Because of the World Equestrian Games a flood light system was installed in the show jumping and in the Hauptstadion.

Eventing and vaulting were added to the CHIO Aachen in 2007, influenced by the World Equestrian Games. Also since 2007 the Show jumping Nations Cup is held at Thursday eventing (former at Friday afternoon) – in the television prime time.

In 2011, the 80th time a horse show is held at the Sport Park Soers in Aachen.

== Venue ==
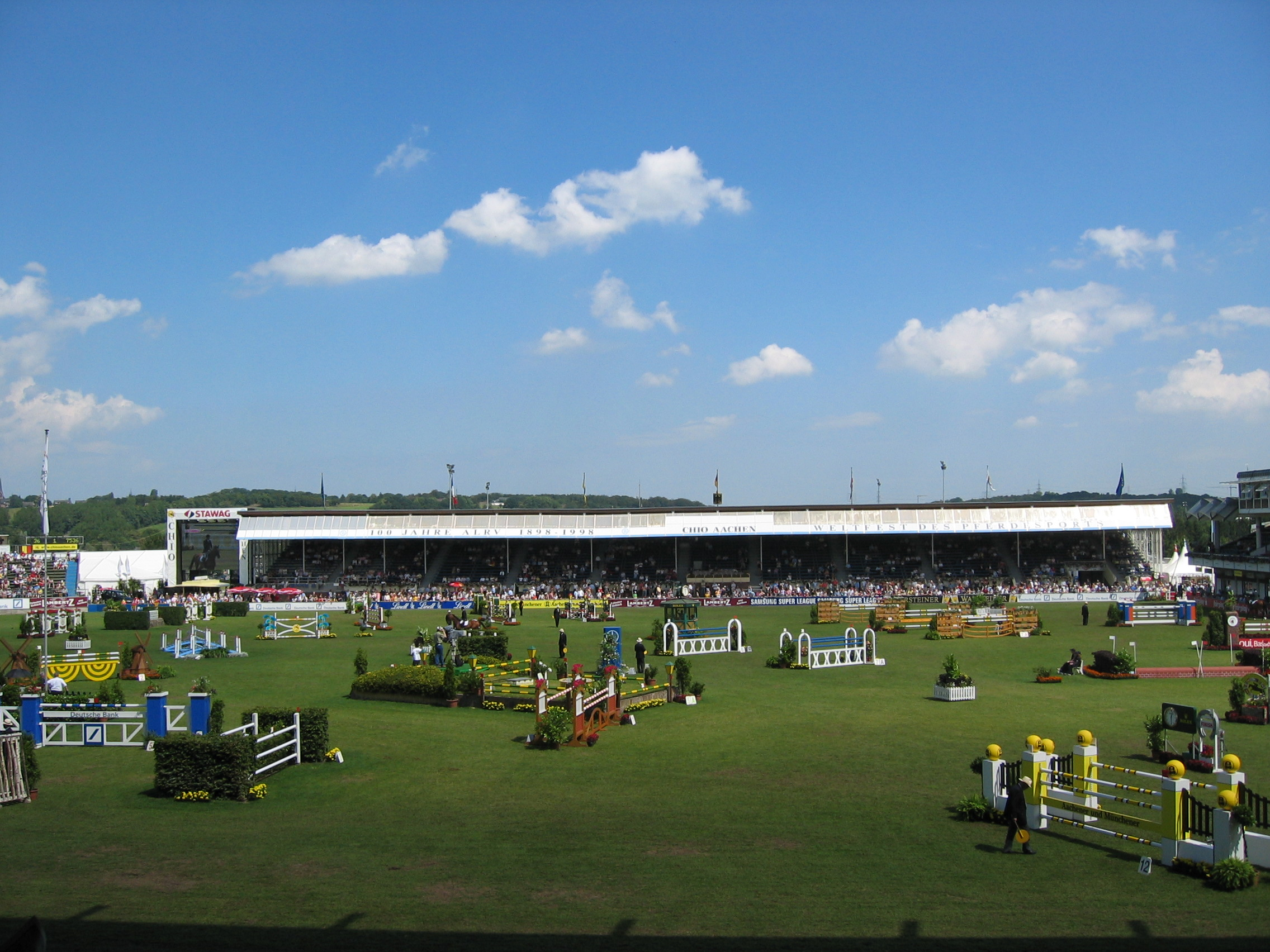
Hauptstadion during the 2004 CHIO Aachen

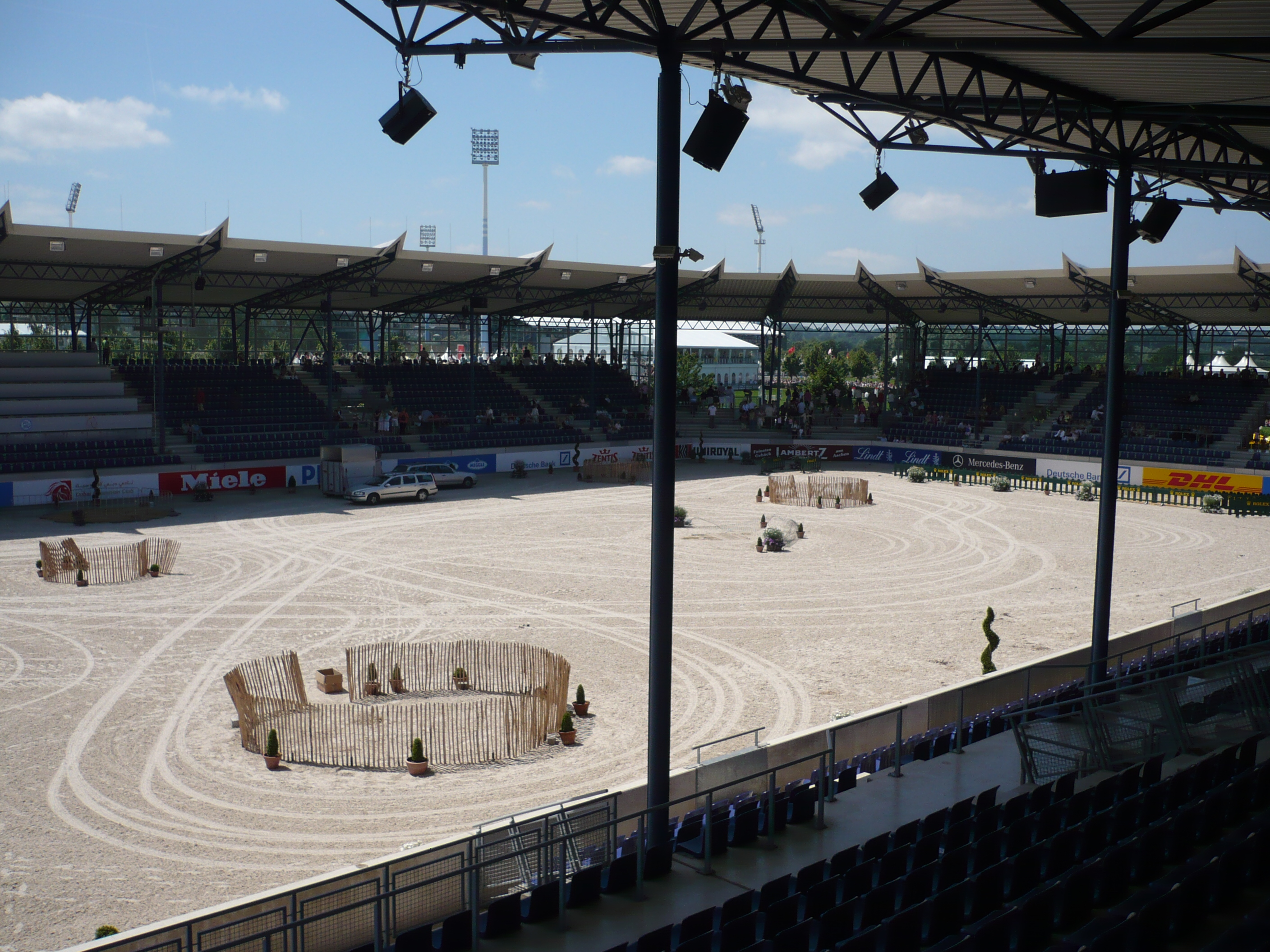
The "Deutsche Bank Stadion" during the 2004 CHIO Aachen

The event is held at the Soers in the northern part of Aachen. Here the different disciplines held at different places. The showjumping competitions are held in the "Hauptstadion", the dressage events are held in the "Deutsche Bank Stadion", and the vaulting competitions are held in the "Albert-Vahle-Halle", all in the Soers.

== Lists of winners ==
From the German-Wikipedia:

- Show jumping: de:Liste der Sieger im Springreiten beim CHIO Aachen
- Dressage: de:Liste der Sieger im Dressurreiten beim CHIO Aachen
- Four-in-hand driving: de:Liste der Sieger im Fahren beim CHIO Aachen
- Eventing: de:Liste der Sieger in der Vielseitigkeit beim CHIO Aachen
- Vaulting: de:Liste der Sieger im Voltigieren beim CHIO Aachen

== See also ==
- 2010 CHIO Aachen
- 2011 CHIO Aachen
- 2012 CHIO Aachen
- CHIO Rotterdam
- 2026 FEI World Equestrian Games
