= 2012 Falsterbo Horse Show =

The 2012 Falsterbo Horse Show was the 2012 edition of the Falsterbo Horse Show, the Swedish official show jumping horse show. It was held as CSIO 5* and CDI 5*.

The first horse show was held 1920 in Falsterbo, in 1969 the first show jumping derby was held here.

The 2012 edition of the Falsterbo Horse Show was held between July 12, 2012, and July 15, 2012.

== FEI Nations Cup of Sweden ==
The 2012 FEI Nations Cup of Sweden was part of the 2012 Falsterbo Horse Show. It was the sixth competition of the 2012 FEI Nations Cup and was held on Friday, July 13, 2012, at 2:30 pm. The competing teams were: Ireland, Germany, Great Britain, Switzerland, the Netherlands, France, Sweden and Belgium.

The competition was a show jumping competition with two rounds and optionally one jump-off. The height of the fences were up to 1.60 meters.

The competition is endowed with 200,000 €.

	Team	Rider	Horse	Round A	Round B	Total penalties	Jump-off		Prize money	scoring points
	Team	Rider	Horse	Penalties	Penalties	Total penalties	Penalties	Time (s)	Prize money	scoring points
1	Sweden	Jens Fredricson	Lunatic	0	0		0	37.62		
1	Sweden	Malin Baryard-Johnsson	Tornesch	0	8					
1	Sweden	Henrik von Eckermann	Coupe de Coeur	12	8					
1	Sweden	Rolf-Göran Bengtsson	Ninja	4	0					
1	Sweden			4	8	12	0	37,62	€64,000	10
2	Great Britain	William Funnell	Billy Angelo	0	0		0	40.75		
2	Great Britain	Alexandra Thornton	Caballero	12	17					
2	Great Britain	Tina Fletcher	Ursula XII	0	8					
2	Great Britain	Robert Smith	Voila	4	0					
2	Great Britain			4	8	12	0	40.75	€40,000	7
3	France	Jerome Hurel	Ohm De Ponthual	0	0		4	43.74		
3	France	Aymeric de Ponnat	Armitages Boy	0	8					
3	France	Marc Dilasser	Obiwan de Piliere	4	16					
3	France	Pénélope Leprevost	Topinambour	0	4					
3	France			0	12	12	4	43.74	€32,000	6
4	Switzerland	Arthur Gustavo da Silva	Luis della Caccia	0	4					
4	Switzerland	Martin Fuchs	Principal	12	nicht gestartet					
4	Switzerland	Christina Liebherr	Callas Sitte Z	4	4					
4	Switzerland	Clarissa Crotta	West Side van de Meerputhoeve	0	4					
4	Switzerland			4	12	16			€24,000	5
5	Germany	Holger Wulschner	Cefalo	4	12					
5	Germany	Jörg Naeve	Commanchi	0	4					
5	Germany	Tim Rieskamp-Goedeking	Chopin	4	4					
5	Germany	Thomas Voß	Carinjo	8	4					
5	Germany			8	12	20			€16,000	4
6	Belgium	Ludo Philippaerts	Kassini Jac	4	4					
6	Belgium	Donaat Brondeel	Adorado	4	4					
6	Belgium	Nicola Philippaerts	Carlos V.H.P.Z.	4	4					
6	Belgium	Koen Vereecke	Allegro C van de Donkhoeve	aufgegeben	8					
6	Belgium			12	12	24			€11,000	3
7	Netherlands	Mathijs van Asten	Credence Z	4	4					
7	Netherlands	Hendrik-Jan Schuttert	Cerona	12	4					
7	Netherlands	Leon Thijssen	Haertthago	12	12					
7	Netherlands	Jeroen Dubbeldam	Quality Time	0	4					
7	Netherlands			16	12	28			€8,000	2
8	Ireland	Shane Breen	Cos I Can	16	0					
8	Ireland	Capt. David O'Brien	Annestown	24	16					
8	Ireland	Shane Carey	Ballymore Eustace	0	5					
8	Ireland	Clement McMahon	Pacino	13	0					
8	Ireland			29	5	34			€5,000	1

(grey penalties points do not count for the team result)

== JMS Falsterbo Derby ==
The Falsterbo Derby is an important show jumping competition at the 2012 Falsterbo Horse Show. The sponsor of this competition is JMS. A Derby is a show jumping competition with special fences like walls or natural fences build of wood (another example of a derby competition in show jumping is the British Jumping Derby).

This competition will be held on Saturday, July 13, 2012, at 3:45 pm. The competition is a show jumping competition with one round and one jump-off.

	Rider	Horse	Round 1		jump-off		prize money
	Rider	Horse	Penalties	Time (s)	Penalties	Time (s)	prize money
1	(France) Olivier Robert	Belle Rock	0	-	0	50.19	€19,000
2	(Republic of Ireland) Capt. David O'Brien	Mo Chroi	0	-	0	52.99	€12,000
3	(Republic of Ireland) Dermott Lennon	Lou-Lou	4	159.38			€9,000
4	(Netherlands) Leon Thijssen	Dahlia Z	4	161.38			€6,000
5	(United Kingdom) William Funnell	Dorada	4	163.97			€3,600

(Top 5 of 25 Competitors)

== Grand Prix Spécial (B-Final) ==
The 2012 Falsterbo Horse Show is the venue of the first competition of the World Dressage Masters (WDM) – rider ranking, season 2012/2013.

All competitors had started first in the Grand Prix de Dressage at Saturday. The eight best-placed competitors of the Grand Prix de Dressage were allowed to start in the A-Final (the Grand Prix Freestyle). If some of best-placed competitors had want to start in the B-Final, the same number of competitors, who are placed after the best-placed competitors, move up in the A-Final.

The Grand Prix Spécial is the B-Final of the World Dressage Masters competitions at 2012 Falsterbo Horse Show. The B-Final was held as Grand Prix Spécial, the competition with the highest definite level of dressage competitions. This year the shorter 2012 Olympic version was ridden.

The B-Final of the World Dressage Masters competitions at 2012 Falsterbo Horse Show was held on July 15, 2012, at 10:00 am. It was endowed with €20,000 .

	Rider	Horse	Score
1	(Norway) Lillann Jebsen	Pro-Set	69.467 %
2	(Germany) Dorothee Schneider	Forward Looking	68.200 %
3	(Sweden) Charlotte Haid Bondergaard	Triviant	68.000 %

(top 3 of 7 competitors)

== Grand Prix Freestyle (A-Final) ==
The Grand Prix Freestyle, the A-Final of the World Dressage Masters, is a Freestyle dressage competition. The level of this competition is at least the level of a Grand Prix de Dressage, but it can be higher than the level of a Grand Prix Spécial.

The Grand Prix Freestyle at the 2012 Falsterbo Horse Show was held on Sunday, July 15, 2012, at 12:15 noon. It was endowed with €70,000 .

	Rider	Horse	Score
1	(Sweden) Patrik Kittel	Scandic	79.100 %
2	(Germany) Isabell Werth	El Santo NRW	78.825 %
3	(Sweden) Tinne Vilhelmson-Silfven	Favourit	73.000 %
4	(Norway) Cathrine Rasmussen	Fernandez	71.700 %
5	(Sweden) Sofie Lexner	Charming Boy	71.500 %

(top 5 of 8 competitors)

== Longines Falsterbo Grand Prix ==
The Grand Prix was the mayor show jumping competition of the 2012 Falsterbo Horse Show. The sponsor of this competition was Longines. It was held on Sunday, July 15, 2012, at 2:30 pm. The competition was a show jumping competition with two rounds, the height of the fences were up to 1.60 meters.

	Rider	Horse	Round 1	jump-off		prize money
	Rider	Horse	Penalties	Penalties	Time (s)	prize money
1	(Belgium) Nicola Philippaerts	Carlos	0	0	50.21	€66,000
2	(United States) Brianne Goutal	Nice de Prissey	0	0	50.50	€40,000
3	(Sweden) Peder Fredricson	Cash In	0	0	51.42	€30,000
4	(Switzerland) Arthur Gustavo da Silva	Luis della Caccia	0	0	52.08	€20,000
5	(Denmark) Linnea Ericsson	Extens	0	0	53.36	€12,000

(Top 5 of 44 Competitors)
