= 2012 CSIO Schweiz =

The 2012 CSIO Schweiz (English: CSIO Switzerland) was the 2012 edition of the CSIO Schweiz, the Swiss official show jumping horse show, at Gründenmoos in St. Gallen. It was held as CSIO 5*.

The first horse show were held 1884 at St. Gallen. Up to the 1970s the CSIO Schweiz was held on year in Geneva and the next year in Lucerne. In the next years, up to 2006, the CSIO Schweiz was held one year in St. Gallen and in the outer year in Lucerne. Since 2007 each year the CSIO Schweiz are held in St. Gallen.

The 2012 edition of the CSIO Schweiz was held between May 31, 2012 and June 3, 2012.

== FEI Nations Cup of Switzerland ==
The 2012 FEI Nations Cup of Switzerland was part of the 2012 CSIO Schweiz. It was the third competition of the 2012 FEI Nations Cup and was held at Friday, June 1, 2012 at 2:45 pm. The competing teams were: the Netherlands, Germany, the Switzerland, Belgium, France, Great Britain, Sweden and Ireland.

The competition was a show jumping competition with two rounds and optionally one jump-off. The height of the fences were up to 1.60 meters. All teams were allowed to start in the second round. The competition is endowed with 200,000 €.

	Team	Rider	Horse	Round A	Round B	Total penalties	Jump-off		Prize money	scoring points
	Team	Rider	Horse	Penalties	Penalties	Total penalties	Penalties	Time (s)	Prize money	scoring points
1	Netherlands	Leon Thijssen	Tyson	4	0					
1	Netherlands	Marc Houtzager	Voltaire	1	4					
1	Netherlands	Jeroen Dubbeldam	Utascha	1	0					
1	Netherlands	Gerco Schröder	New Orleans	9	1					
1	Netherlands			6	1	7			64,000 €	10
2	Switzerland	Werner Muff	Kiamon	0	0					
2	Switzerland	Janika Sprunger	Palloubet d'Halong	8	0					
2	Switzerland	Clarissa Crotta	West Side van Meerputhoeve	0	0					
2	Switzerland	Pius Schwizer	Carlina	12	retired					
2	Switzerland			8	0	8			36,000 €	6.5
2	Great Britain	Nick Skelton	Carlo	4	0					
2	Great Britain	Michael Whitaker	Viking	4	12					
2	Great Britain	Tim Stockdale	Kalico Bay	0	0					
2	Great Britain	John Whitaker	Maximillian	4	0					
2	Great Britain			8	0	8			36,000 €	6.5
4	Germany	Christian Ahlmann	Taloubet Z	1	0					
4	Germany	Rene Tebbel	Light On	0	8					
4	Germany	Meredith Michaels-Beerbaum	Bella Donna	0	8					
4	Germany	Marcus Ehning	Plot Blue	8	0					
4	Germany			1	8	9			24,000 €	5
5	Belgium	Niels Bruynseels	Conisha van de Helle	4	12					
5	Belgium	Dirk Demeersman	Bufero van het Panishof	4	4					
5	Belgium	Rik Hemeryck	Quarco de Kerambars	1	4					
5	Belgium	Grégory Wathelet	Cadjanine Z	8	8					
5	Belgium			9	16	25			16,000 €	4
6	Ireland	Shane Sweetnam	Amaretto D'Arco	4	8					
6	Ireland	Jessica Kürten	Voss	9	0					
6	Ireland	Cian O'Connor	Blue Loyd	8	4					
6	Ireland	Billy Twomey	Je T'Aime Flamenco	4	12					
6	Ireland			16	12	28			11,000 €	3
7	France	Simon Delestre	Napoli du Ry	4	4					
7	France	Patrice Delaveau	Ornella Mail	4	10					
7	France	Pénélope Leprevost	Mylord Carthago	8	5					
7	France	Olivier Guillon	Lord de Theize	20	retired					
7	France			16	19	35			8,000 €	2
8	Sweden	Jens Fredricson	Lunatic	0	4					
8	Sweden	Peder Fredricson	Arctic Aurora Borealis	0	18					
8	Sweden	Helena Persson	Chamonix H	13	13					
8	Sweden	Linda Heed	Bee Wonderful	retired	did not start					
8	Sweden			13	35	48			5,000 €	1

(grey penalties points do not count for the team result)

== Grosses Jagdspringen ==
The “Grosses Jagdspringen” was the biggest competition on Saturday at the 2011 CSIO Schweiz. The sponsor of this competition was Mercedes-Benz Switzerland. It was held at Saturday, June 2, 2012 at 1:00 pm.

The competition was a speed and handiness show jumping competition (faults at fences will be converted into seconds; this seconds will be added to the time of the competitor). The height of the fences was up to 1.45 meters. It was endowed with 80,000 CHF.

	Rider	Horse	Time (s)	Penalties	Result	prize money
1	(Switzerland) Pius Schwizer	Graciella	73.16	(0)	73.16 (73.16 + 0.00)	car
2	(France) Pénélope Leprevost	Oscar des Fontaines	73.68	(0)	73.68 (73.68 + 0.00)	16,000 CHF
3	(United Kingdom) Michael Whitaker	Ingliston Twister	74.01	(0)	74.01 (74.01 + 0.00)	12,000 CHF
4	(Switzerland) Steve Guerdat	Sidney VIII	74.75	(0)	74.75 (74.75 + 0.00)	8,000 CHF
5	(Switzerland) Werner Muff	Osiris du Goyen	71.93	(4)	75.93 (71.93 + 4.00)	5,600 CHF

== Longines Grand Prix ==
The Longines Grand Prix was the major competition of the 2011 CSIO Schweiz. The sponsor of this competition is Longines. It will be held at Sunday, June 3, 2011 at 2:30 pm.

The competition was a show jumping competition with two rounds, the height of the fences will be up to 1.60 meters. It is endowed with 200,000 €. Ten years after his victory with For Pleasure German rider Marcus Ehning win again the Grand Prix of St. Gallen.

	Rider	Horse	Round 1	Round 2		prize money
	Rider	Horse	Penalties	Penalties	Time (s)	prize money
1	(Germany) Marcus Ehning	Plot Blue	0	0	50.26	50,000 €
2	(United Kingdom) Tim Stockdale	Kalico Bay	0	0	51.64	40,000 €
3	(Germany) Christian Ahlmann	Codex One	0	0	52.05	30,000 €
4	(Switzerland) Steve Guerdat	Carpalo	1	0	55.09	20,000 €
5	(Germany) Rene Tebbel	Light On	1	0	60.71	14,000 €
