= CHIO Rotterdam =

International horse show held each summer in Rotterdam, Netherlands

The CHIO Rotterdam (Concours Hippique International Officiel) is an annual international horse show held in Rotterdam, Netherlands. The show is held every year in June. Is the largest international equestrian outdoor event in The Netherlands, hosted at the 'Rotterdamse Manege' in Kralingen.

== The event ==
Two equestrian disciplines, show-jumping and dressage, are part of the CHIO Rotterdam in which both competitions hosts the Nations Cup. Only one Nations Cup in each discipline can be staged in a country, according to the regulations of the International Federation for Equestrian Sports, the FEI. For show-jumping the 5* CSI event is part of the program, while for dressage the 5* CDI event is part of the program. Hosting a 5* in both show-jumping and dressage, making it one of the most prestigious equestrian shows in the world.

== History ==
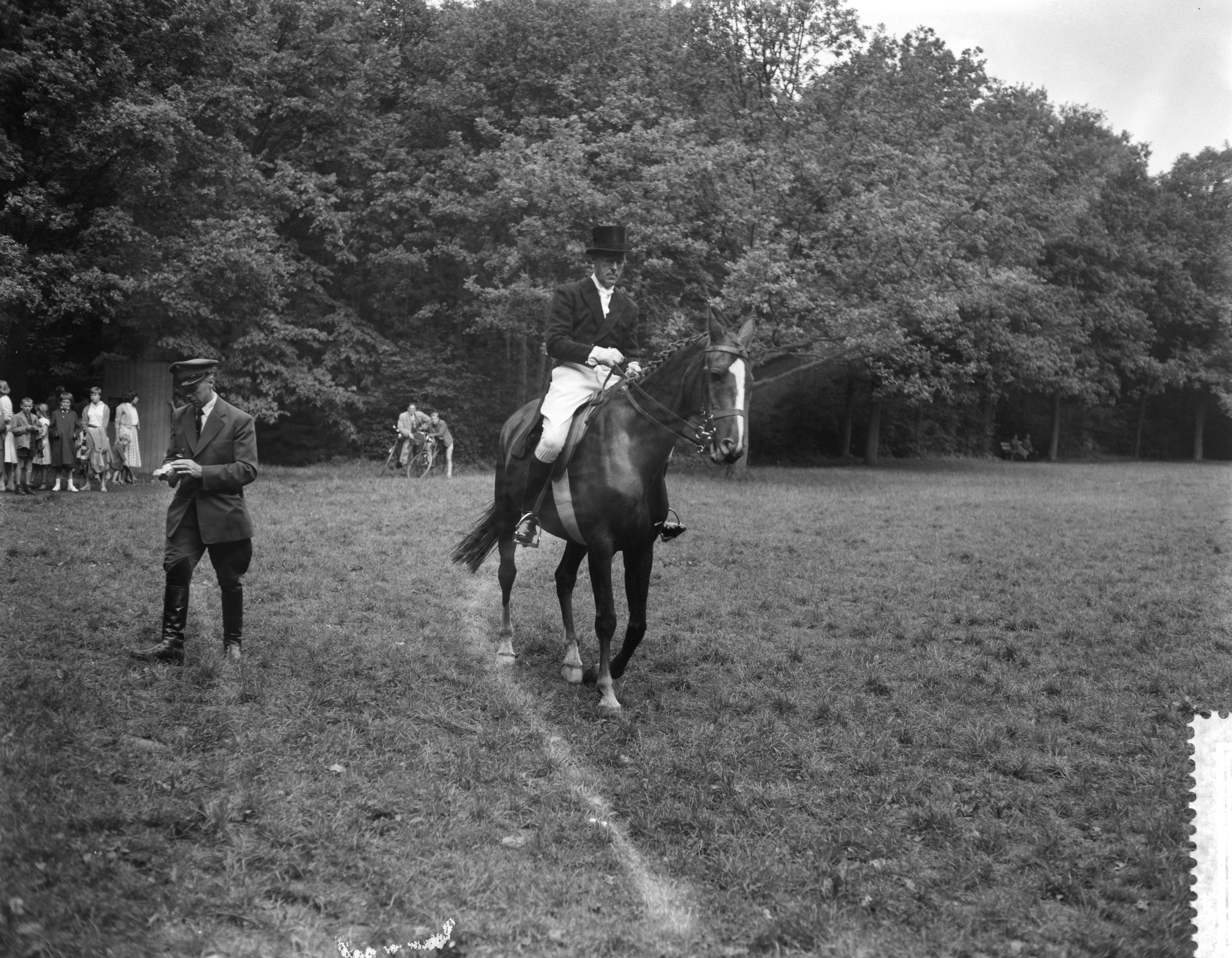
Dressage at the 1957 CHIO Rotterdam

In 1937 the Rotterdam local riding school hosted its first national show at a substantial piece of land. Also in 1939 and 1940 the local riding school hosted the two-day event, but were forced to quit because of World War II. In 1947 the local show was back on the calendar and also welcomed riders from Belgium. The first official international edition of CHIO Rotterdam was in 1948, which makes it the oldest international sport event in the city of Rotterdam. Already during the first edition of the show, a nations cup in show-jumping was held, while dressage was not yet not part of the event. In 1961 a permanent tribune was built for the CHIO Rotterdam, which was sponsored by several local businesses in Rotterdam. The same year the freestyle to music in dressage was introduced. Winner of the first dressage freestyle was the late German Reiner Klimke. A year later, in 1962, the Nations Cup for dressage was also introduced. In 1967 the CHIO Rotterdam hosted the European Championships for show-jumping, celebrating its 20th anniversary. Ten years later in 1979, Rotterdam again hosted the European Championships for show-jumping.

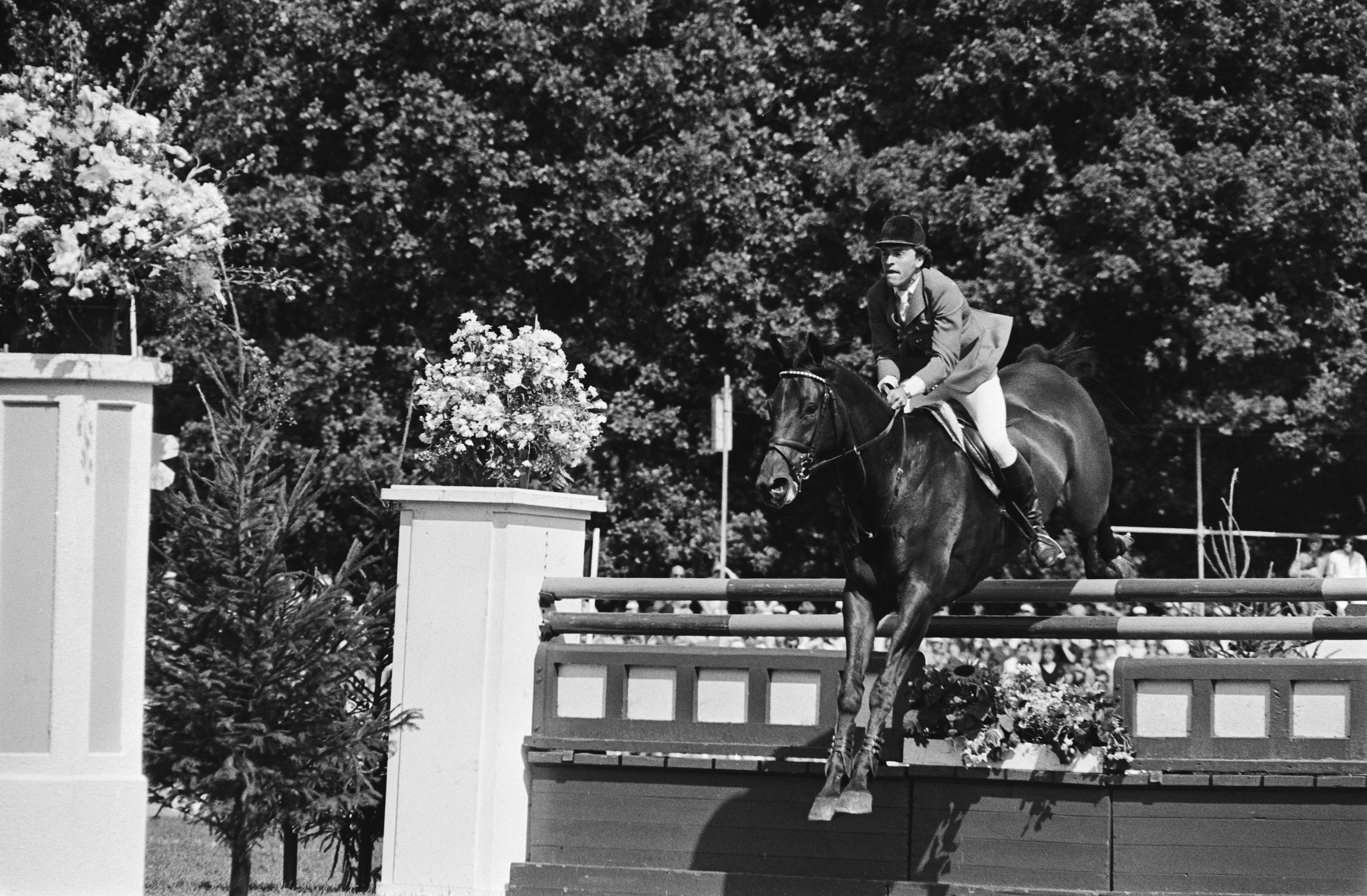
Henk Nooren during the 1980 alternate Olympic Games

In 1980 the Olympic Games in Moscow were boycotted by a major number of countries because of the protest against the Soviet invasion of Afghanistan. CHIO Rotterdam was designated to organize the alternative Olympic Games for equestrian and was won by Austrian Hugo Simon. Nine years later, CHIO Rotterdam hosted again the European Championships for show-jumping.

The 90's was a difficult decade for the organization as the standards of the International Federation became stricter, the costs of organizing the event became significantly high because of the growth, and the municipality in Rotterdam could not agree on the progress and organization surrounding the event. The CHIO Rotterdam takes place in a forest and to further expand, 51 trees had to be cut to make the expansion possible. Ultimately, the plan fell through. Also a setback in the 1990s was the fire at the Rotterdamse Manege, which resulted in the destruction of the specially built tribune.

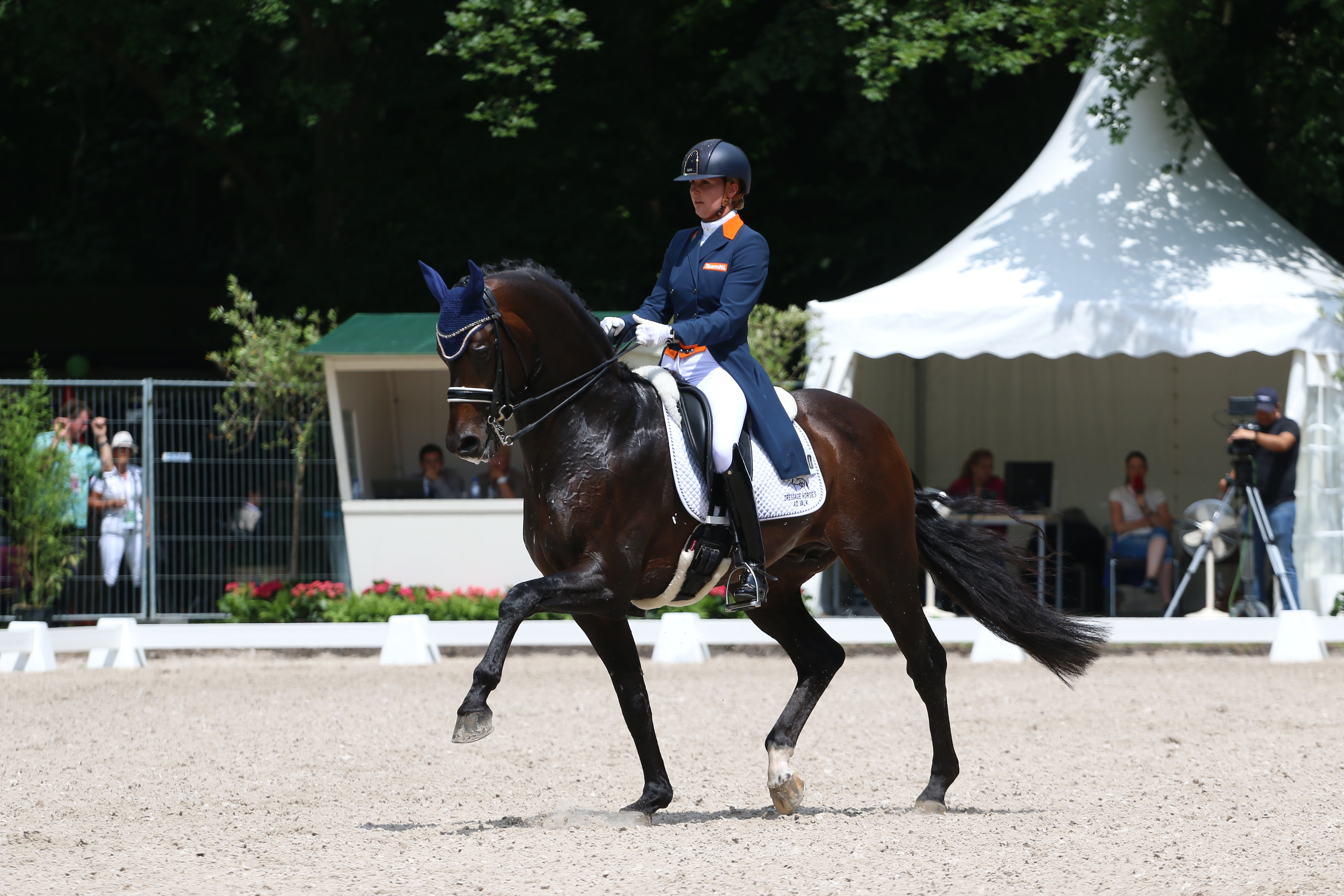
Modern dressage at CHIO Rotterdam (in 2017)

In the 2000s the event is able to grow again and a new era for the event begins, while the popularity of equestrian in The Netherlands was rising. The grass in the main arena was replaced by sand and dressage moved from the smaller second arena to the main arena, while the event became more popular by visitors because of the expansion of exhibitors and more entertainment besides the sport. In 2006 Dutch Olympic gold medalist Anky van Grunsven sets a new world record with her horse Salinero in the freestyle to music. In 2011 a complete new modern tribune was built which resulted in the allocation of the European Championships for dressage. In 2019, for the first time in history the CHIO Rotterdam hosted a multi discipline European Championship for show-jumping, dressage as well as Para-equestrian. In 2023, the FEI announced that Rotterdam will be part of a new format of the show-jumping Nations Cup, the League of Nations. Only five competitions are part of the League of Nations, of which two are on European soil.

== Winners ==
The list of winners names the winner of the Grand Prix of Rotterdam in show-jumping and dressage. The first Grand Prix was in 1937. From 1938 until 1947 the Grand Prix of Rotterdam was cancelled because of the World War II, excluding 1939.

Year	Show-Jumping	Dressage
1937	(Netherlands) Jan de Bruine on Milord	No Dressage
1939	(Netherlands) Christiaan Tonnet on Kantaka	No Dressage
1947	(Netherlands) Jan de Bruine on Kantaka	No Dressage
1948	(Turkey) Ziya Azak on Rizgar	No Dressage
1949	(United Kingdom) Jane Starkey on Cascade	No Dressage
1950	(United Kingdom) Major G. Gibbon on Sarah	No Dressage
1951	(United Kingdom) Harry Llewellyn on Foxhunter	No Dressage
1952	(Mexico) Victor Carrillo on Resorte II	No Dressage
1953	(Germany) Magnus von Buchwaldt on Jaspis	No Dressage
1954	(Republic of Ireland) Kevin Barry on Hollyford	No Dressage
1955	(Spain) Paco Goyoaga on Toscanella	No Dressage
1956	(United Kingdom) Dawn Wofford on Earlsrath Rambler	(Germany) Liselott Linsenhoff on Adular
1957	(Germany) Hans Günter Winkler on Halla
1958	(United States) William Steinkraus on Ksar d’Esprit
1959	(Germany) K. Pade on Domherr
1960	(Germany) Anna Dehning on Nico
1961	(United Kingdom) V. Clark on Atalanta	(Germany) Reiner Klimke on Arcadius
1962	(United Kingdom) Harvey Smith on O’Malley	(Germany) Reiner Klimke on Arcadius
1963	(United Kingdom) Charles David Barker on Mister Softee
1964	(Republic of Ireland) Seamus Hayes on Goodbye
1965	(United Kingdom) William Barker on North Flight
1966	(Brazil) Nelson Pessoa on Caribe
1967	(United Kingdom) David Broome on Mister Softee
1968	(United States) Carol Hofmann on Out Late
1969	(Netherlands) Harry Wouters van den Oudenweijer on Abadan
1970	(Germany) Hauke Schmidt on Causa
1971	(United Kingdom) Alison Dawes on The Maverick
1972	Not held	Not held
1973	(Germany) Alwin Schockemöhle on Rex the Robber
1974	(Italy) Piero D'Inzeo on Easter Light (United Kingdom) Harvey Smith on Salvador III
1975	(Germany) Hendrik Snoek on Gaylord
1976	(France) Christophe Cuyer on Varin	(Germany) Reiner Klimke on Andiana
1977	(Canada) John Simpson on Texas
1978	(Canada) Terry Leibel on Sympatico
1979	(Netherlands) Johan Heins on Argonaut ‘Z (Germany) Paul Schockemöhle on Deister (Germany) Gerd Wiltfang on Roman
1980	(Austria) Hugo Simon on Gladstone
1981	(France) Gilles Bertrán de Balanda on Galoubet A. Malesan
1982	(Germany) Paul Schockemöhle on Deister
1983	(Switzerland) Walter Gabathuler on Beethoven	(Netherlands) Annemarie Sanders on Amon
1984	(Germany) Paul Schockemöhle on Deister
1985	(United Kingdom) Philip Heffer on Viewpoint
1986	(Switzerland) Bruno Candrian on Lampire
1987	(United Kingdom) John Whitaker on Milton	(United States) Robert Dover on Federleicht
1988	(Netherlands) Jos Lansink on Felix
1989	(France) Pierre Durand on Jappeloup (United Kingdom) John Whitaker on Milton
1990	(Germany) Elmar Gundel on Prints
1991	(Germany) Franke Sloothaak on Walzerkönig
1992	(Germany) Ludger Beerbaum on Almox Grand Plaisir	(Netherlands) Anky van Grunsven on Olympic Cocktail
1993	(Germany) Ludger Beerbaum on Almox Rush On
1994	Took not place because of the 1994 FEI World Equestrian Games
1995	(United Kingdom) Michael Whitaker on Everest Two Step	(Netherlands) Gonnelien Rothenberger on Ideaal
1996	(Germany) Franke Sloothaak on San Patrigano Joly	(Netherlands) Anky van Grunsven on Bonfire
1997	(Switzerland) Paul Estermann on Flying Shark CH	(Netherlands) Anky van Grunsven on TCN Partout
1998	(Brazil) Rodrigo Pessoa on Gandini Lianos	No Dressage
1999	(United States) Beezie Madden on Innocence	(Netherlands) Anky van Grunsven on Bonfire
2000	(Austria) Hugo Simon on E.T.	No Dressage
2001	(Germany) Franke Sloothaak on Joli Coeur	(Denmark) Hans Jorgen Norgaard on Pianostar
2002	(Brazil) Rodrigo Pessoa on Baloubet de Rouet	(Netherlands) Anky van Grunsven on Salinero
2003	(Germany) Lars Nieberg on Loreana	(Netherlands) Edward Gal on Gestion Lingh
2004	(Netherlands) Gert-Jan Bruggink on Joel	(Netherlands) Anky van Grunsven on Salinero
2005	(Germany) Lars Nieberg on Lucie	(Netherlands) Kirsten Beckers on Broere Jazz
2006	(Germany) Marcus Ehning on Gitania	(Netherlands) Anky van Grunsven on Salinero
2007	(United States) Laura Kraut on Anthem	(Netherlands) Anky van Grunsven on Salinero
2008	(Netherlands) Albert Zoer on Sam	(France) Hubert Perring on Diabolo St Maurice
2009	(Switzerland) Steve Guerdat on Tresor V	(Netherlands) Edward Gal on Totilas
2010	(Sweden) Rolf-Göran Bengtsson on Casall La Silla	(Netherlands) Edward Gal on Totilas
2011	(United States) Beezie Madden on Coral Reef Via Volo	No Dressage because of the 2011 European Dressage Championships
2012	(Netherlands) Marc Houtzager on Sterrehof's Tamino	(Sweden) Tinne Vilhelmson-Silfvén on Don Auriello
2013	(Germany) Philipp Weishaupt on Monte Bellini	(United Kingdom) Charlotte Dujardin on Valegro
2014	(France) Patrice Delaveau on Orient Express Hdc	(Netherlands) Adelinde Cornelissen on Parzival
2015	(United States) Lucy Davis on Barron	(Sweden) Patrik Kittel on Watermill Scandic
2016	(Portugal) Luciana Diniz on Fit for Fun 13	(Sweden) Tinne Vilhelmson-Silfvén on Don Auriello
2017	(Sweden) Peder Fredricson on H&M All In	(United States) Laura Graves on Verdades
2018	(Belgium) Jos verlooy on Caracas	(Netherlands) Edward Gal on Zonik N.O.P.
2019	Took not place because of the 2019 FEI European Championships
2020	Cancelled due to the COVID-19 pandemic
2021	(Netherlands) Sanne Thijssen on Con Quidam	(Germany) Isabell Werth on Weihegold OLD
2022	(Republic of Ireland) Daniel Coyle on Oak Grove's Carlyle	(Sweden) Patrik Kittel on Zepter
2023	(Netherlands) Willem Greve on Highway M TN	(France) Morgan Barbançon on Habana Libre
2024	(Netherlands) Marc Houtzager on Dante	(Netherlands) Dinja van Liere on Hermes
2025	(United States) Karl Cook on Caracole de la Roque	(Netherlands) Hans-Peter Minderhoud on Taminiau
2026	(United Kingdom) Ben Maher on Point Break

== See also ==
- 2010 CHIO Rotterdam
- 2011 CHIO Rotterdam
- 2012 CHIO Rotterdam
