= Olivier Philippaerts =

Belgian equestrian

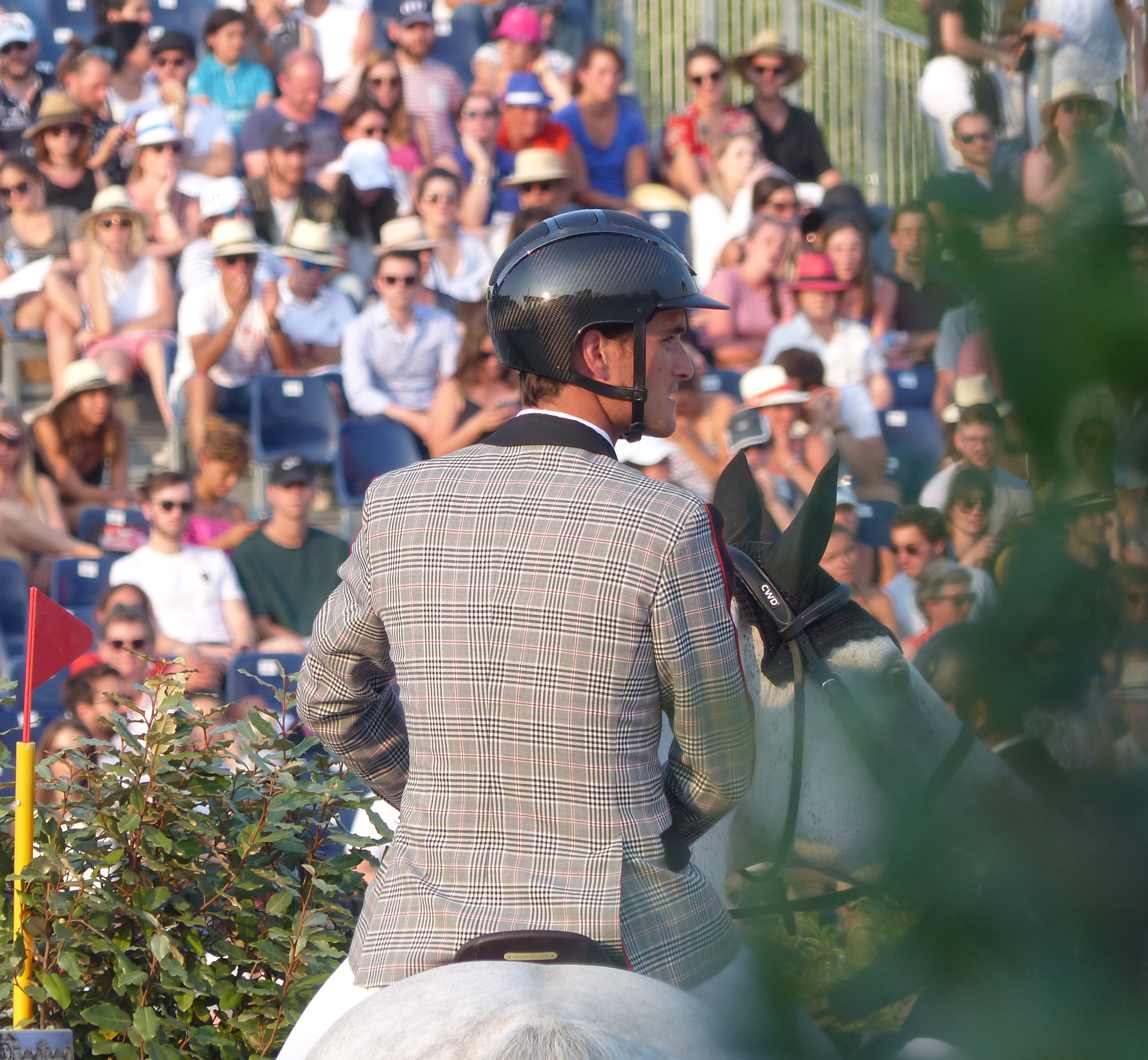

Personal information
- Nationality: Belgian
- Discipline: Show jumping
- Born: 30 July 1993 (age 33)
Medal record
Representing Belgium
European Championships
Bronze medal – third place	2021 Riesenbeck	Team jumping

Olivier Philippaerts (born 30 July 1993 ) is a Belgian show jumping rider. He is a native of Genk, Limburg, Belgium. He is the son of Ludo Philippaerts and twin brother of Nicola Philippaerts, both show jumping riders as well.

Together with his father and brother, and Olympic Gold Medal winner Jos Lansink, he finished third at the 2012 Piazza di Siena FEI Nations Cup of Italy. On 9 September 2012, he became the youngest rider ever to win the CN International Grand Prix at the 2012 CSIO Spruce Meadows 'Masters' Tournament.
