= Nicola Philippaerts =

Belgian professional Equestrian

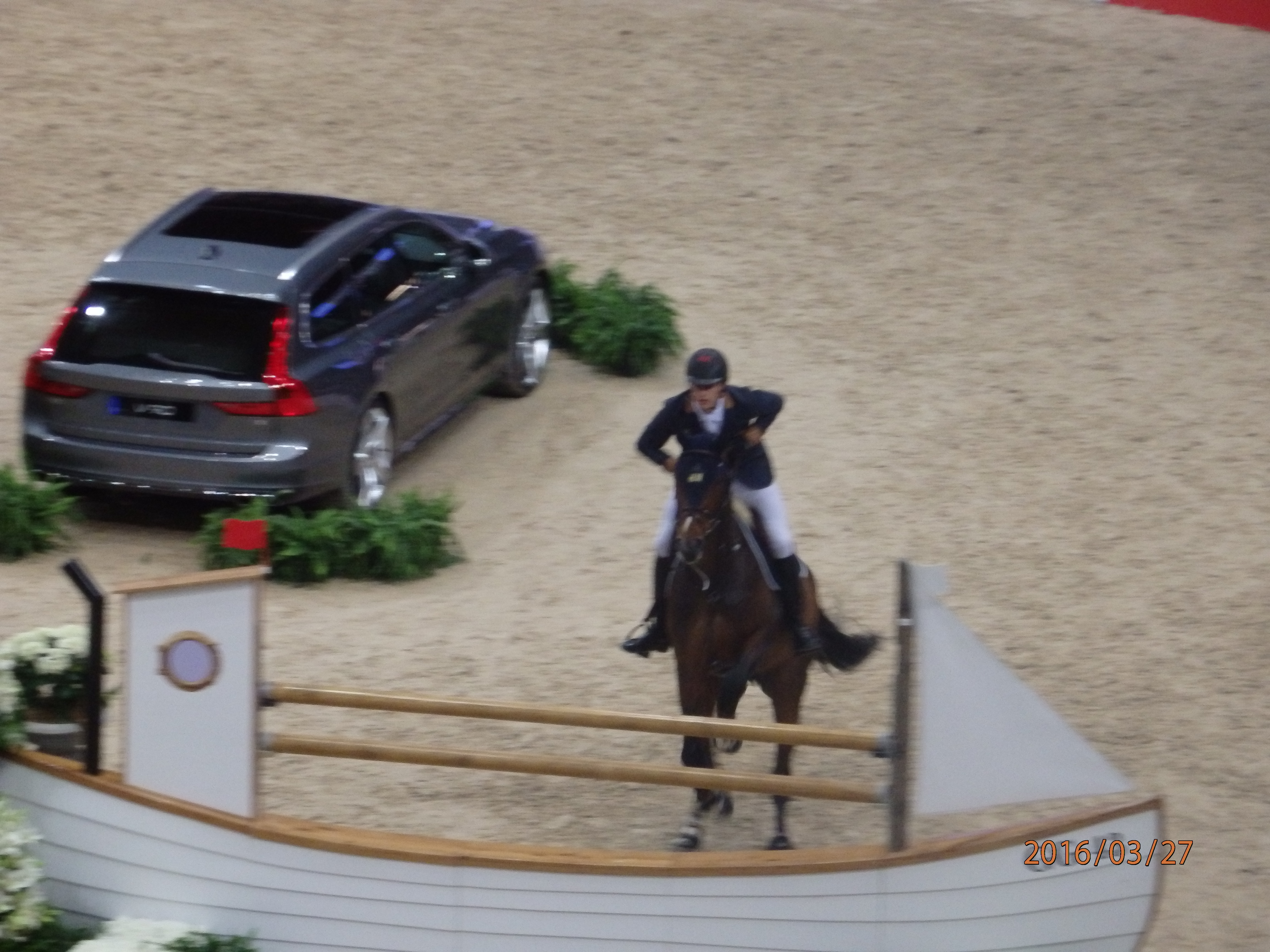
- Philippaerts in 2016

Personal information
- Nationality: Belgian
- Discipline: Show Jumping
- Born: 30 July 1993 (age 33)
Medal record
Representing Belgium
World Championships
Silver medal – second place	2026 Aachen	Team jumping
European Championships
Gold medal – first place	2025 A Coruña	Team jumping
Bronze medal – third place	2021 Riesenbeck	Team jumping
Representing (International Olympic Committee) Mixed-NOCs team
Youth Olympic Games
Gold medal – first place	2010 Singapore	Team jumping

Nicola Philippaerts (born 30 July 1993) is a Belgian show jumping rider. He is a native of Genk, Limburg, Belgium. He is the son of Ludo Philippaerts and twin brother of Olivier Philippaerts, both show jumping riders as well.

== Career ==
He competed at the Equestrian at the 2010 Summer Youth Olympics, finishing 23rd individually but winning the gold medal in the team event.

In 2011, he finished fifth in the Longines International Grand Prix of Ireland at the 2011 Dublin Horse Show. He won the gold medal in Comporta, Portugal at the European Young Riders Show Jumping Championship, and the silver medal at the Belgian senior championship.

In 2012, he won the Longines Grand Prix at the 2012 Falsterbo Horse Show. Together with his father and brother, and Olympic Gold Medal winner Jos Lansink, he finished third at the 2012 Piazza di Siena FEI Nations Cup of Italy.

At the 2016 Olympics, in Rio de Janeiro, he was disqualified from competition for excessive use of his spurs and whip.
