= 2012 FEI Nations Cup =

The 2012 FEI Nations Cup was the 2012 edition of the FEI Nations Cup, a premier international team Grand Prix show jumping competition run by the FEI. It was held at eight European venues from May 11 concluding in Dublin on August 17, 2012. Germany retained the title they won in 2011.

== 2012 show schedule ==
Date	Show	Winning team
May 11, 2012	2012 Jumping International de France; La Baule, France; CSIO***** €200,000	Belgium
May 25, 2012	2012 Piazza di Siena (Italy) Rome, Italy; CSIO***** €200,000	Germany
June 1, 2012	2012 CSIO Schweiz (Switzerland) St. Gallen, Switzerland; CSIO***** €200,000	Netherlands
June 22, 2012	2012 CHIO Rotterdam (Netherlands) Rotterdam, Netherlands; CSIO***** €200,000	Germany
July 5, 2012	2012 CHIO Aachen (Germany) Aachen, Germany; CSIO***** €250,000	France
July 14, 2012	2012 Falsterbo Horse Show (Sweden) Skanör med Falsterbo, Sweden; CSIO***** €200,000	Sweden
July 20, 2012	2012 Royal International Horse Show (United Kingdom) Hickstead, United Kingdom; CSIO***** €200,000	Ireland
August 17, 2012	2012 Dublin Horse Show (Republic of Ireland) Dublin, Ireland; CSIO***** €200,000	Ireland

== Standings ==
At the end of the season, the two teams with the lowest points will be relegated to the 2013 FEI Nations Cup Promotional League.

	Team	Points								Total
	Team	FRA (France)	ITA (Italy)	SUI (Switzerland)	NED (Netherlands)	GER (Germany)	SWE (Sweden)	GBR (United Kingdom)	IRL (Republic of Ireland)	Total
1	Germany	5	10	5	10	7	4	6	1	48
2	France	1	5	2	6	10	6	7	7	44
3	Ireland	3	1	3	5	6	1	10	10	39
4	Great Britain	3	3,5	6,5	3	4	7	5	6	38
5	Switzerland	3	7	6,5	4	5	5	1	3,5	35
6	Netherlands	7	3,5	10	2	3	2	2	5	34,5
7	Sweden	7	2	1	7	2	10	3,5	2	33,5
8	Belgium	10	6	4	1	1	3	3,5	3,5	32

Sweden wins through in three-round thriller at Falsterbo, FEI press release with Standings after six competitions]
