= Hauptstadion =

Stadium in Aachen, Germany

Coordinates: 50°47′36″N 6°5′50″E

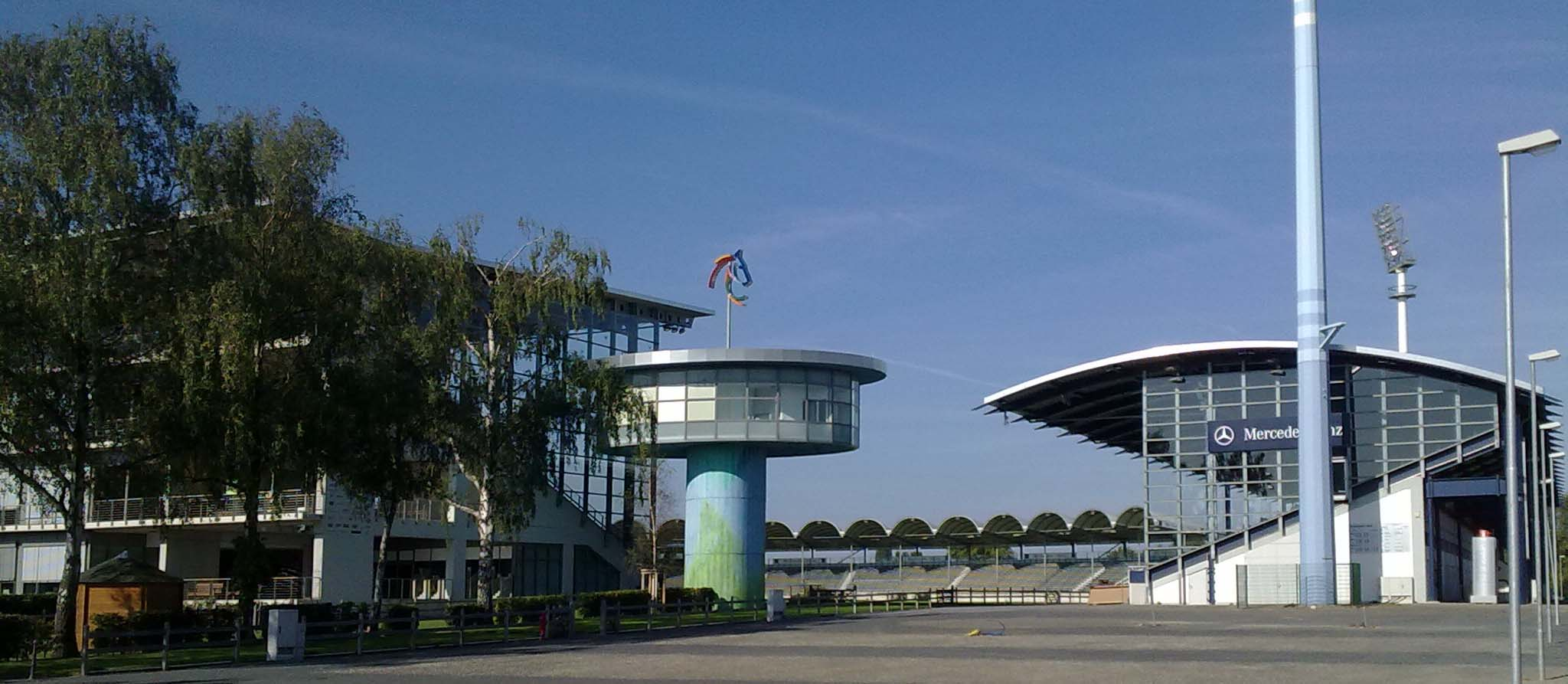
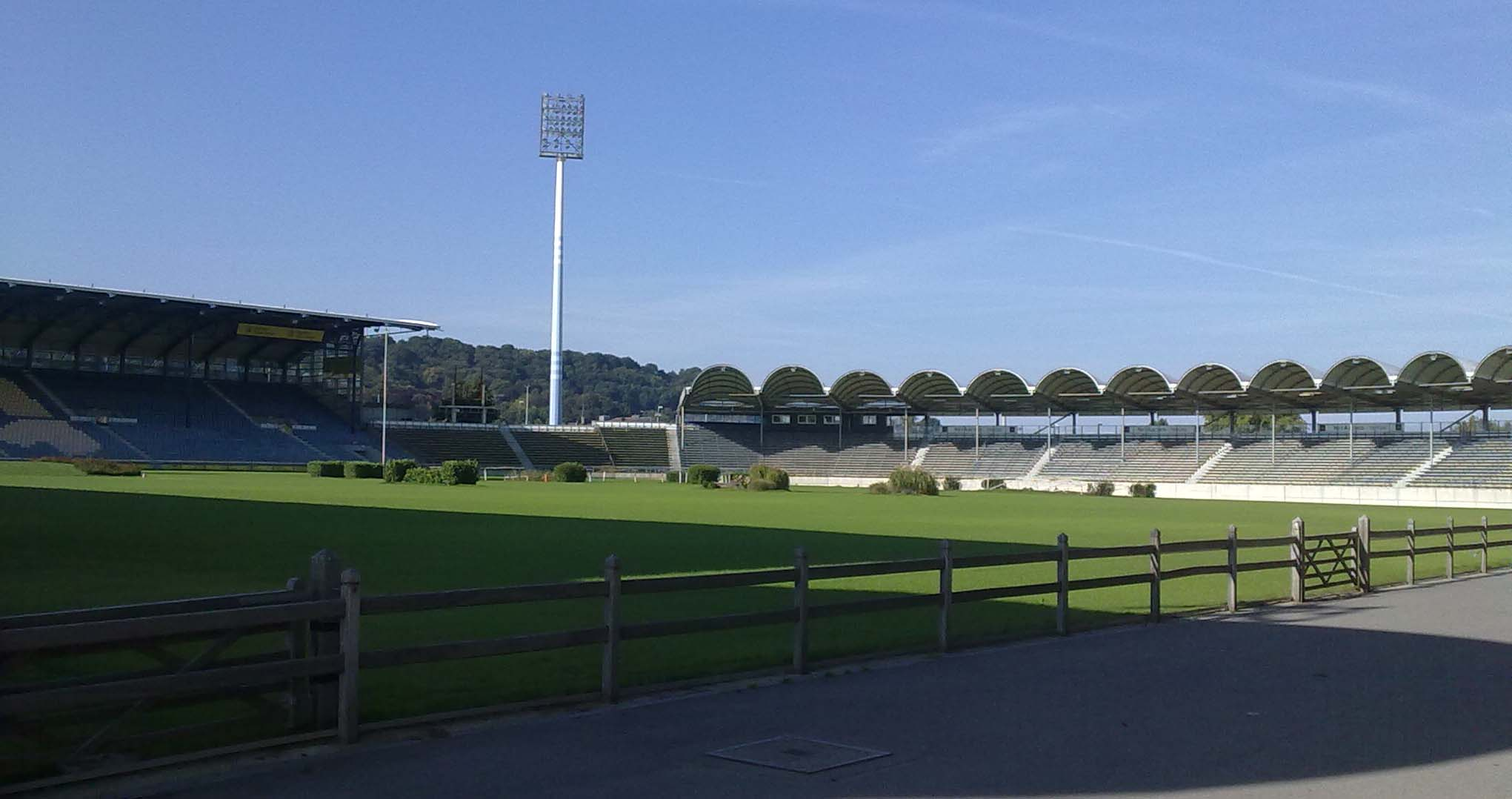
- Interactive map of Hauptstadion
- Location: Aachen, Germany
- Owner: Aachen Laurensberger Rennverein e.V. (ALRV)
- Capacity: 40,000
- Surface: Grass
- Field size: 120 × 150

Construction
- Opened: 1924
- Cost: 17 million EUR
- Architect: Hermann Tilke

Tenants
- CHIO Aachen, 2006 FEI World Equestrian Games

The Hauptstadion is a stadium located in Sport Park Soers in Aachen, Germany. It is used for equestrian and show jumping. It was renovated in 2005 and has a capacity of 40,000 spectators. It hosted the 2006 FEI World Equestrian Games.

In July 1970, it was the location of the Aachen Open Air Pop Festival.
