= Westphalian Horse Museum =

Coordinates: 51°56′51.49″N 7°35′14.11″E

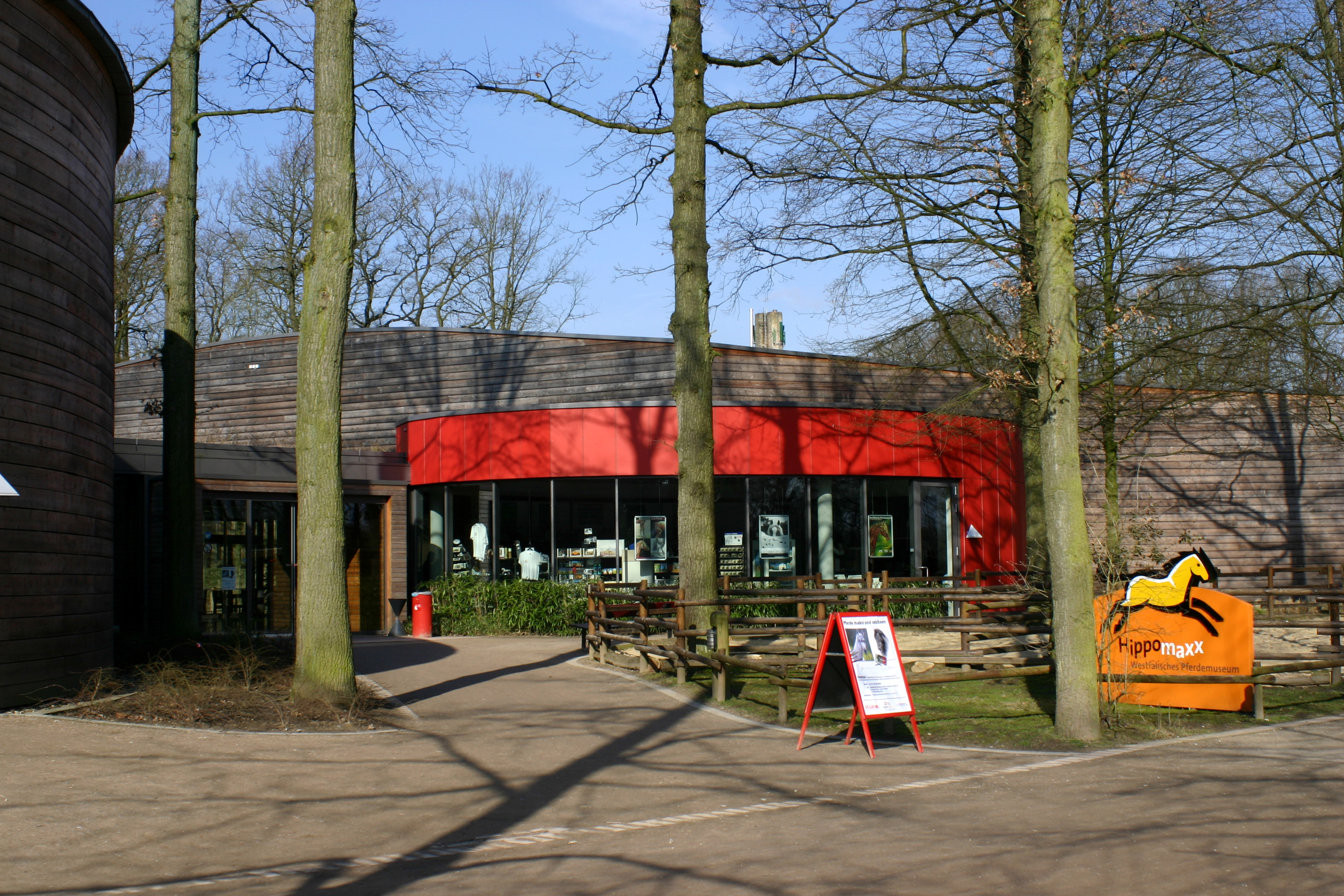
Hippomaxx

The Westfälische Pferdemuseum Münster - Hippomaxx is in the Allwetterzoo in Münster, Westphalia, Germany. The Hippomaxx is an independent entity in the Allwetterzo managed by Verein zur Förderung des Westfälischen Pferdemuseums e.V.. Entrance is included to the admission charge of the zoo.
