= Ludo Philippaerts =

Belgian equestrian (born 1963)

Personal information
- Nationality: Belgium
- Discipline: Show jumping
- Born: 22 June 1963 (age 61); Genk, Belgium
- Height: 5.9 ft 7.8 in (2.00 m)
- Weight: 176 lb (80 kg; 12 st 8 lb)

Ludo Philippaerts (born 22 June 1963) is a Belgian show jumping rider. He is a native of Genk, Limburg, Belgium.

== Career ==
Philippaerts is a four-time Olympian. As an individual, he ranked 4th at both the 2000 Olympic Games and the 2004 Olympic Games. In Athens, the Belgian team, of which he was a part, ranked 6th. At the 1992 Summer Olympics in Barcelona, Philippaerts and his late champion horse, Darco, ranked 7th.

Philippaerts won the 2008 FEI World Cup final in Mechelen, 26–30 December 2008. At the 2006 FEI World Equestrian Games in Aachen, he had an individual rank of 9 and a team rank of 7. He competed at the World Equestrian Games twice before, in 1998 and 1990.

He was the BP Cup Champion in Spruce Meadows in 2006 and the 2006 winner of the Global Champions Tour. In 2005, his fourth consecutive year of competition in the Show Jumping World Cup, Philippaerts ranked 9th. He ranked 15th at the 1989 European Championships in Rotterdam.

== Family ==
Philippaerts was born into an equestrian family. His brother, Johan Philippaerts, and his four sons are also showjumping riders.

He and his wife Veronique have four children:

- Nicola and Olivier (twins), b.1993
- Thibault, b.2001
- Anthony, b.2003

== See also ==
- Equestrian at the 2000 Summer Olympics
- Equestrian at the 2004 Summer Olympics
- Equestrian at the 1996 Summer Olympics
- Equestrian at the 1992 Summer Olympics
- CSIO Spruce Meadows 'Masters' Tournament
- European Show Jumping Championships
