= Individual dressage at the 2015 European Dressage Championships =

The individual dressage at the 2015 European Dressage Championships in Aachen, Germany was held at Stade Michel d'Ornano from 12 to 16 August.

Great Britain's Charlotte Dujardin won gold medal in both Grand Prix Special and Grand Prix Freestyle, repeating her success from 2013 European Dressage Championship held in Herning, Denmark. Kristina Bröring-Sprehe representing the host nation Germany won a silver medal in both Grand Prix Freestyle and Grand Prix Special. Hans Peter Minderhoud of Netherlands won a bronze in special, his first ever individual championship medal while Spain's Beatriz Ferrer-Salat won a bronze in freestyle, the first medal for Spain since 2005.

== Competition format ==
The team and individual dressage competitions used the same results. Dressage had three phases. The first phase was the Grand Prix. Top 30 individuals advanced to the second phase, the Grand Prix Special where the first individual medals were awarded. The last set of medalsat the 2015 European Dressage Championships was awarded after the third phase, the Grand Prix Freestyle where top 15 combinations competed.

== Judges ==
The following judges were appointed to officiate during the European Dressage Championships.

- (Germany) Katrina Wüst (Ground Jury President)
- (Netherlands) Eduard de Wolff-van Westerrode (Ground Jury Member)
- (United States) Anne Gribbons (Ground Jury Member)
- (United Kingdom) Andrew Gardner (Ground Jury Member)
- (Sweden) Annette Fransen Iacobaeus (Ground Jury Member)
- (France) Jean-Michel Roudier (Ground Jury Member)
- (Denmark) Susanne Baarup (Ground Jury Member)
- (Slovenia) Maja Stukelj (Technical Delegate)

== Schedule ==
All times are Central European Summer Time (UTC+2)

Date	Time	Round
Wednesday, 12 August 2015	09:30	Grand Prix (Day 1)
Thursday, 13 August 2014	11:00	Grand Prix (Day 2)
Saturday, 15 August 2014	11:00	Grand Prix Special
Sunday, 16 August 2014	13:30	Grand Prix Freestyle

== Results ==
Rider	Nation	Horse	GP score	Rank	GPS score	Rank	GPF score	Rank
Charlotte Dujardin	Great Britain	Valegro	83.029	1 Q	87.577	(gold) Q	89.054	1st place, gold medalist(s)
Kristina Bröring-Sprehe	Germany	Desperados	79.743	3 Q	83.067	(silver) Q	88.804	2nd place, silver medalist(s)
Beatriz Ferrer-Salat	Spain	Delgado	77.186	5 Q	77.395	4 Q	82.714	3rd place, bronze medalist(s)
Isabell Werth	Germany	Don Johnson	74.900	13 Q	75.924	7 Q	82.482	4
Hans Peter Minderhoud	Netherlands	Johnson	77.586	4 Q	79.034	(bronze) Q	82.411	5
Tinne Vilhelmson-Silfvén	Sweden	Don Auriello	75.157	12 Q	76.148	6 Q	80.643	6
Jessica von Bredow-Werndl	Germany	Unee	75.200	10 Q	74.790	8 Q	80.214	7
Carl Hester	Great Britain	Nip Tuck	75.400	9 Q	77.003	5 Q	79.571	8
Diederik van Silfhout	Netherlands	Arlando	75.814	7 Q	74.426	10 Q	78.696	9
Karen Tebar	France	Don Luis	73.771	17 Q	73.193	12 Q	74.964	10
Patrick van der Meer	Netherlands	Uzzo	72.400	19 Q	73.151	13 Q	74.375	11
Morgan Barbançon	Spain	Painted Black	73.957	15 Q	71.429	14 Q	76.589	12
Gonçalo Carvalho	Portugal	Batuta	70.557	23 Q	71.148	15 Q	73.375	13
Fiona Bigwood	Great Britain	Orthilia	75.800	8 Q	74.510	9 Q	WD	–
Anna Kasprzak	Denmark	Donnperignon	72.986	18 Q	73.473	11 Q	WD	–
Marcela Krinke-Susmelj	Switzerland	Molberg	69.914	30 Q	70.714	16		
Jorinde Verwimp	Belgium	Tiamo	71.086	22 Q	70.560	17		
Pierre Volla	France	Badinda Altena	70.357	25 Q	70.238	18		
Michael Eilberg	Great Britain	Marakov	69.943	29 Q	69.930	19		
Terhi Stegars	Finland	Axis	69.971	28 Q	69.636	20		
Victoria Max-Theurer	Austria	Blind Date	75.200	10 Q	69.412	21		
Emilie Nyreröd	Sweden	Miata	71.829	20 Q	69.384	22		
Jeroen Devroe	Belgium	Eres	70.486	24 Q	69.160	23		
Trude Hestengen	Norway	Tobajo Pik Disney	69.900	31 Q	68.992	24		
Marina Aframeeva	Russia	Vosk	70.300	26 Q	68.824	25		
Jose Daniel Martin Dockx	Spain	Grandioso	71.343	21 Q	68.179	26		
Mikala Münter Gundersen	Denmark	My Lady	70.229	27 Q	67.997	27		
Inessa Merkulova	Russia	Mister X	73.800	16 Q	67.003	28		
Edward Gal	Netherlands	Undercover	82.229	2 Q	EL	–		
Patrik Kittel	Sweden	Deja	74.571	14 Q	RET	–		
Matthias Alexander Rath	Germany	Totilas	75.971	6 Q	WD	–		
Daniel Pinto	Portugal	Santurion de Massa	69.614	32				
Laurence Vanommeslaghe	Belgium	Avec Plaisir	69.529	33				
Judy Reynolds	Ireland	Vancouver K	69.486	34				
Anna-Mengia Aerne	Switzerland	Raffaelo va Bene	69.443	35				
Astrid Neumayer	Austria	Rodriguez	69.386	36				
Veronique Henschen	Luxembourg	Fontalero	69.329	37				
Fanny Verliefden	Belgium	Annarico	69.200	38				
Daniel Bachmann Andersen	Denmark	Loxana	68.857	39				
José Antonio Garcia Mena	Spain	Norte Lovera	68.771	40				
Minna Telde	Sweden	Santana	68.714	41				
Inna Logutenkova	Ukraine	Don Gregorius	68.657	42				
Ludovic Henry	France	After You	68.629	43				
Elena Sidneva	Russia	Romeo-Star	68.443	44				
Zaneta Skowronska	Poland	Mystery	67.600	45				
Rikke Svane	Denmark	Finckenstein	67.586	46				
Filipe Canelas	Portugal	Der Clou	67.557	47				
Ekaterina Kharchenko	Russia	Gulliver	67.257	48				
Eevamaria Porthan-Broddell	Finland	Solos Lacan	67.186	49				
Arnaud Serre	France	Robinson de Lafont	67.100	50				
Alexandra Slanec	Austria	Lord of Dream	66.943	51				
Caroline Häcki	Switzerland	Rigoletto Royal	66.929	52				
Leonardo Tiozzo	Italy	Randon	66.514	53				
Diane Erpelding	Luxembourg	Woltair	66.271	54				
Anne Lene Holmen	Norway	Rainbow Dancer	66.214	55				
Sascha Schulz	Luxembourg	Wito Corleone	66.000	56				
Kristina Böckmann	Finland	Der Kleine Lord	65.957	57				
Maksim Kovshov	Ukraine	Flirt	65.900	58				
Birgit Wientzek Pläge	Switzerland	For Compliment	65.200	59				
Ester Soldi	Italy	Harmonia	65.029	60				
Anna Lukasik	Poland	Ganda	65.000	61				
Svetlana Kiseliova	Ukraine	Parish	64.614	62				
Katarzyna Milczarek	Poland	Dzeko	64.600	63				
Fie Christine Skarsoe	Luxembourg	One Night Stand	64.429	64				
Emma Kanerva	Finland	Solina	64.357	65				
Federica Scolari	Italy	Beldonwelt	64.114	66				
Louise Løkken	Norway	Mr Gold	63.871	67				
Dina Ellermann	Estonia	Akvarel	63.800	68				
Maria Caetano	Portugal	Xiripiti	63.786	69				
Micol Rustignoli	Italy	Corallo Nero	63.729	70				
Evelyn Haim-Swarovski	Austria	Dorina	63.157	71				
Alisa Kovan'ko	Ukraine	Stallone	EL	–				
