= 2015 in equestrianism =

2015 in equestrianism describes the timeline and results of various equestian sporting events that occurred in the year 2015. Events which followed on from those which took place in the year prior are also included.

== 2016 Summer Olympics (Test event) ==
- August 6–9: Aquece Rio International Horse Trials 2015 in Brazil (Olympic Test Event)
  - Dressage winner: (Brazil) Marcelo Tosi with horse BRIEFING DB Z
  - Cross Country winner: (Brazil) Márcio Jorge with horse CORONEL MCJ
  - Jumping winner: (Brazil) Márcio Jorge with horse CORONEL MCJ

== International Federation for Equestrian Sports (FEI) ==
=== FEI World Cup Show jumping ===
- April 5, 2014 – April 19, 2015: 2014–15 FEI World Cup Show Jumping season
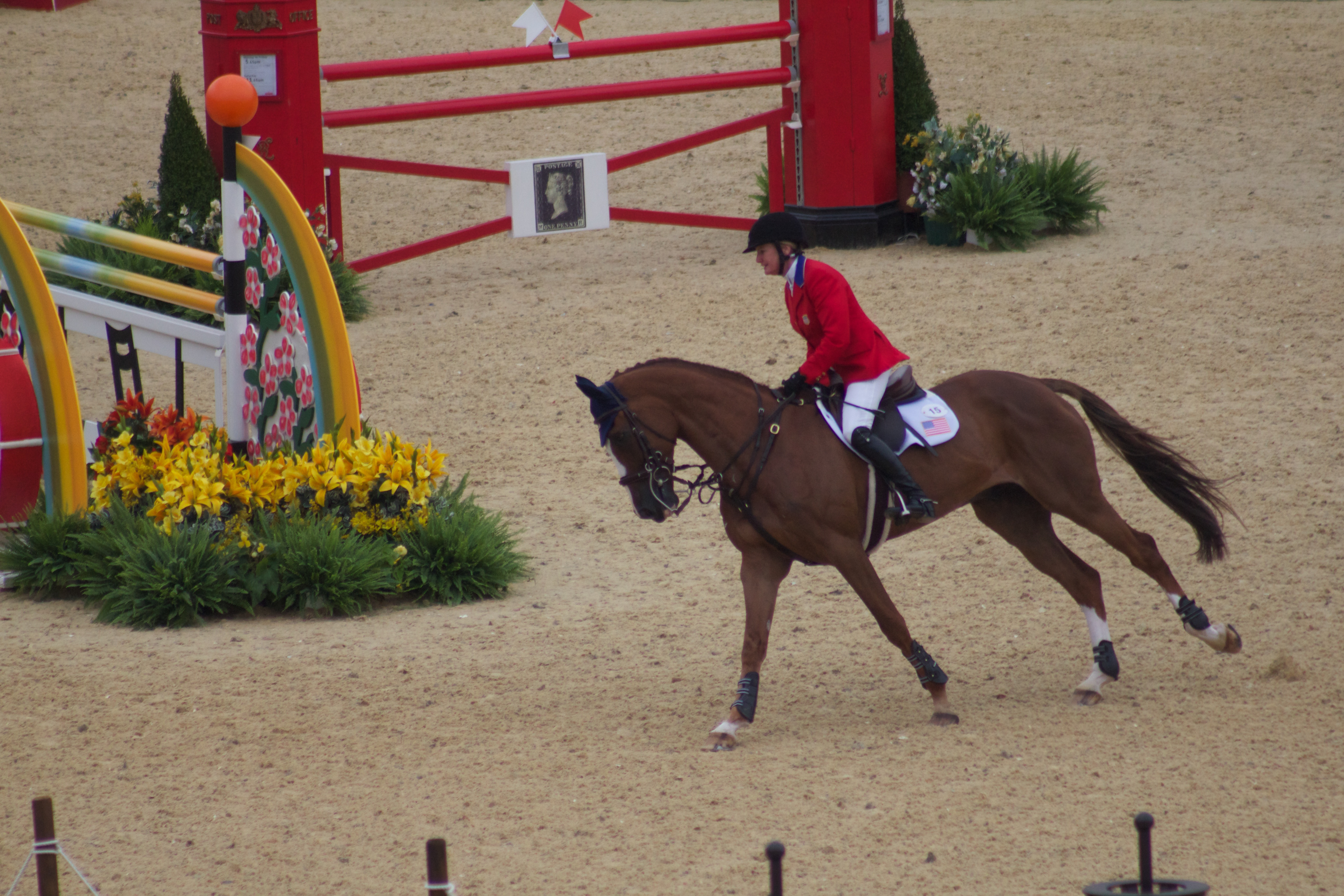
  - Equestrian sports
    April 5, 2014 – November 23, 2014: 2014 FEI Japan League
    - Overall winner: (Japan) Tae Sato (with horse Vrouwe Toltien)
  - April 24, 2014 – July 5, 2014: 2014 FEI Central Asian League
    - Overall winner: (Kyrgyzstan) Rinat Galimov (with horse Charlize)
  - April 25, 2014 – October 7, 2014: 2014 FEI China League
    - Overall winner: (China) Zhao Zhiwen (with horse Bolero)
  - April 25, 2014 – January 25, 2015: 2014–15 FEI Australian League
    - Overall winner: (Australia) Tim Clarke (with horse Caltango)
  - May 1, 2014 – November 30, 2014: 2014 FEI Central European League South
    - Overall winner: (Slovenia) Tomaž Laufer (with horse Heart Stealer)
  - May 14, 2014 – November 16, 2014: 2014 FEI South African League
    - Overall winner: (South Africa) Nicole Horwood (with horse Capital Don Cumarco)
  - May 14, 2014 – November 23, 2014: 2014 FEI South American South League
    - Overall winner: (Brazil) Sergio Henriques Neves Marins (with horse Landpeter do Feroleto)
  - May 28, 2014 – February 22, 2015: 2014–15 FEI North American League West
    - Overall winner: (United States) Susan Artes (with horse Zamiro)
  - June 5, 2014 – November 15, 2014: 2014 FEI Caucasian League
    - Overall winner: (Azerbaijan) Kanan Novruzov (with horse Concorde 57)
  - June 12, 2014 – December 7, 2014: 2014 FEI Central European League North
    - Overall winner: (Lithuania) Andrius Petrovas (with various horses)
  - June 13, 2014 – August 18, 2014: 2014 FEI South American North League
    - Overall winner: (Colombia) Camilo Rueda (with horse Cassaro 5)
  - July 23, 2014 – March 22, 2015: 2014–15 FEI North American League East
    - Overall winner: (United States) Todd Minikus (with horse Quality Girl)
  - October 10, 2014 – February 7, 2015: 2014–15 FEI Arab League
    - Overall winner: (Saudi Arabia) Abdullah Al-Sharbatly (with various horses)
  - October 16, 2014 – March 1, 2015: 2014–15 FEI Western European League
    - Overall winner: (Switzerland) Steve Guerdat (with various horses)
  - October 22, 2014 – January 11, 2015: 2014–15 FEI New Zealand League
    - Overall winner: (New Zealand) Katie Laurie (with various horses)
  - October 24, 2014 – November 30, 2014: 2014 FEI South East Asian League
    - Overall winner: (Thailand) Siengsaw Lertratanachai (with horse Viranka B)
- March 12–15: 2015 FEI Central European League Final in (Poland) Warsaw
  - Winner: (Germany) Marcel Marschall (with horse Undercontract)
- April 15–19: 2015 FEI World Cup Finals (show jumping and dressage) in (United States) Las Vegas
  - Winner: (Switzerland) Steve Guerdat (with horse Albfeuhren's Paille)

=== FEI World Cup Dressage ===
- May 23, 2014 – March 22, 2015: 2014–15 FEI World Cup Dressage season
  - May 23, 2014 – October 12, 2014: 2014 FEI Central European League
    - Winner: (Russia) Elena Sidneva (with horse Romeo-Star)
  - June 6, 2014 – March 22, 2015: 2014–15 FEI North American League
    - Winner: (United States) Steffen Peters (with horse Legolas 92)
  - July 17, 2014 – January 25, 2015: 2014–15 FEI Asia/Pacific League
    - July 17–20, 2014: 2014 Brisbane QLD in Australia
      - Grand Prix: (Australia) Suzanne Hearn (with horse Remmington)
      - Grand Prix Freestyle to Music: (Australia) Chantal Wigan (with horse Ferero)
      - Grand Prix Special: (Australia) Suzanne Hearn (with horse Remmington)
    - October 23–26, 2014: 2014 Sydney NSW in Australia
      - Grand Prix: (Australia) Heath Ryan (with Regardez Moi)
      - Grand Prix Freestyle to Music: (Australia) Heath Ryan (with Regardez Moi)
    - November 20–23, 2014: 2014 Melbourne Equitana VIC in Australia
      - Grand Prix: (Australia) Heath Ryan (with Regardez Moi)
      - Grand Prix Freestyle to Music: (Australia) Heath Ryan (with Regardez Moi)
    - January 21–25, 2015: 2015 Boneo VIC in Australia
      - Grand Prix: (Australia) Mary Hanna (with horse Umbro)
      - Grand Prix Freestyle to Music: (Australia) Mary Hanna (with horse Umbro)
  - October 16, 2014 – March 15, 2015: 2014–15 FEI Western European League
    - Winner: (Netherlands) Edward Gal (with horse Glock's Underground)
- April 15–19: 2015 FEI World Cup Finals in (United States) Las Vegas (shared with the show jumping event)
  - Winner: (United Kingdom) Charlotte Dujardin (with horse Valegro)

=== FEI Nations Cup in Show Jumping ===
- February 10 – September 6: 2015 FEI Nations Cup Show Jumping Schedule
  - February 10–15: Cup #1 in (United States) Ocala, Florida
    - Team Jumping winners: Ireland
      - Darragh Kenny with horse Picolo
      - Lorcan Gallagher with horse Diktator van de Boslehoeve
      - Kevin Babington with horse Shorapur, and
      - Conor Swail with horse Grafton
  - February 18–21: Cup #2 in (United Arab Emirates) Abu Dhabi
    - Team Jumping winners: Qatar
      - Ali Al Rumaihi with horse Gunder
      - Khalid Al Emadi with horse Tamira IV
      - Sheikh Ali Bin Khalid Al Thani with horse Vienna Olympic, and
      - Bassem Hassan Mohammed with horse Palloubet d'Halong
  - April 23–26: Cup #3 at the (Mexico) Coapexpan Equestrian Club in Xalapa
    - Team Jumping winners: United States
      - Candice King with horse Kismet 50
      - Callan Solem with horse VDL Wizard
      - Ali Wolff with horse Casall, and
      - Brianne Goutal with horse Nice de Prissey
  - April 29 – May 3: Cup #4 in (Belgium) Lummen
    - Team Jumping winners: Italy
      - Luca Maria Moneta with horse Neptune Brecourt
      - Lorenzo de Luca with horse Erco van T Roosakker
      - Daniele Augusto Da Rios with horse For Passion, and
      - Piergiorgio Bucci with horse Casallo Z
  - May 7–10: Cup #5 in (Austria) Linz–Ebelsberg
    - Team Jumping winners: Czech Republic
      - Zuzana Zelinkova with horse Caleri II
      - Emma Augier de Moussac with horse Charly Brown
      - Ondrej Zvara with horse Cento Lano, and
      - Ales Opatrny with horse Acovardo
  - May 14–17: Cup #6 in (France) La Baule-Escoublac
    - Team Jumping winners: Great Britain
      - Joe Clee with horse Utamaro D'Ecaussines
      - Spencer Roe with horse Wonder Why
      - Guy Williams with horse Titus, and
      - Michael Whitaker with horse Cassionato
  - May 14–17: Cup #7 in (Denmark) Odense
    - Team Jumping winners: Belgium
      - Gilles Dunon with horse Fou de Toi v. Keihoeve
      - Catherine van Roosbroeck with horse Gautcho da Quinta
      - Wilm Vermeir with horse Garrincha Hedoniste, and
      - Jerome Guery with horse Papillon Z
  - May 21–24: Cup #8 in (Italy) Rome
    - Team Jumping winners: Great Britain
      - Holly Gillott with horse Dougie Douglas
      - Robert Whitaker with horse Catwalk IV
      - Michael Whitaker with horse Cassionato, and
      - John Whitaker with horse Argento
  - May 28–31: Cup #9 in (Portugal) Lisbon
    - Team Jumping winners: Spain
      - Alberto Marquez Galobardes with horse Belcanto Z
      - Gerardo Menendez Mieres with horse Cassino DC
      - Laura Roquet Puignero with horse Quilate del Duero, and
      - Ivan Serrano Saenz with horse Condor
  - June 4–7: Cup #10 in (Poland) Sopot
    - Team Jumping winners: Germany
      - André Thieme with horse Conthendrix
      - Janne Friederike Meyer with horse Goja
      - Holger Wulschner with horse BSC Cavity, and
      - Patrick Stühlmeyer with horse Lacan
  - June 4–7: Cup #11 in (Switzerland) St. Gallen
    - Team Jumping winners: Belgium
      - Piete Devos with horse Dream of India Greenfield
      - Niels Bruynseels with horse Pommeau du Heup
      - Jos Verlooy with horse Domino, and
      - Grégory Wathelet with horse Conrad de Hus
  - June 17–21: Cup #12 in (Netherlands) Rotterdam
    - Team Jumping winners: Great Britain
      - Ben Maher with horse Diva II
      - Joe Clee with horse Utamaro D'Ecaussines
      - Jessica Mendoza with horse Spirit T, and
      - Michael Whitaker with horse Cassionato
  - July 9–12: Cup #13 in (Sweden) Falsterbo
    - Team Jumping winners: Netherlands
      - Harrie Smolders with horse Emerald
      - Maikel van der Vleuten with horse Vdl Groep Verdi Tn N.O.P.
      - Leopold van Asten with horse Vdl Groep Zidane, and
      - Gerco Schröder with horse Glock'S Cognac Champblanc
  - July 16–19: Cup #14 in (Hungary) Budapest
    - Team Jumping winners: Denmark
      - Sören Pedersen with horse Tailormade Chaloubet
      - Rikke Haastrup with horse Qualico du Bobois
      - Thomas Sandgaard with horse Amarone, and
      - Andreas Schou with horse Allstar
  - July 23–26: Cup #15 in (Slovakia) Bratislava
    - Team Jumping winners: France
      - Geoffroy de Coligny with horse Qaid Louviere
      - Marc Le Berre with horse Rubis du Rustick
      - Bernard Briand Chevalier with horse Qadillac du Heup, and
      - Francois Xavier Boudant with horse Stella Lyght
  - July 30 – August 2: Cup #16 in (United Kingdom) Hickstead, West Sussex
    - Team Jumping winners: Belgium
      - Pieter Devos with horse Dylano
      - Judy Ann Melchior with horse As Cold As Ice Z
      - Gudrun Patteet with horse Sea Coast Pebles Z, and
      - Olivier Philippaerts with horse H&M Armstrong van de Kapel
  - August 5–9: Cup #17 in (Republic of Ireland) Dublin
    - Team Jumping winners: Ireland
      - Bertram Allen with horse Romanov
      - Greg Patrick Broderick with horse Mhs Going Global
      - Cian O'Connor with horse Good Luck, and
      - Darragh Kenny with horse Sans Soucis Z
  - August 26–31: Cup #18 in (Spain) Gijón
    - Team Jumping winners: France
      - Alexandre Fontanelle with horse Prime Time des Vagues
      - Cyril Bouvard with horse Quasi Modo Z
      - Adeline Hecart with horse Pasha du Gue, and
      - Aymeric de Ponnat with horse Ricore Courcelle
  - September 2–6: Cup #19 (final) in (Italy) Arezzo
    - Team Jumping winners: Brazil
      - Marlon Módolo Zanotelli with horse Valetto Jx
      - Karina Johannpeter with horse Casper
      - Yuri Mansur Guerios with horse Cornetto K, and
      - Bernardo Alves with horse Vatson Sitte
- September 24–27: 2015 FEI Nations Cup in Show Jumping Series Final in (Spain) Barcelona
  - Team Jumping winners: Belgium
    - Olivier Philippaerts with horse H&M Armstrong van de Kapel
    - Judy-Ann Melchior with horse As Cold As Ice Z
    - Jos Lansink with horse For Cento, and
    - Grégory Wathelet with horse Conrad de Hus

=== FEI Nations Cup in Dressage ===
- March 4 – July 19: 2015 FEI Nations Cup Dressage Schedule
  - March 4–8: Cup #1 in (France) Vidauban
    - Individual Dressage winner: (Netherlands) Dominique Filion (with horse Wenicienta)
    - Team Dressage winners: Germany
      - Victoria Michalke with horse Dance On OLD
      - Thomas Wagner with horse Amoricello
      - Sanneke Rothenberger with horse Wolke Sieben 21, and
      - Bernadette Brune with horse Spirit of the Age OLD
  - March 24–28: Cup #2 in Wellington, Florida
    - Individual Dressage winner: (United States) Laura Graves (with horse Verdades)
    - Team Dressage winners: United States
      - Olivia LaGoy-Weltz with horse Rassing's Lonoir
      - Kimberly Herslow with horse Rosmarin
      - Allison Brock with horse Rosevelt, and
      - Laura Graves with horse Verdades
  - June 17–21: Cup #3 in Rotterdam
    - Individual Dressage winner: (Sweden) Patrick Kittel (with horse Watermill Scandic)
    - Team Dressage winners: Netherlands
      - Patrick van der Meer with horse Uzzo
      - Diederik van Silfhout with horse Arlando N.O.P.
      - Hans Peter Minderhoud with horse Glock's Johnson TN, and
      - Edward Gal with horse Glock's Undercover N.O.P
  - July 8–12: Cup #4 in Hagen
    - Individual Dressage winner: (Germany) Kristina Bröring-Sprehe (with horse Desperados FRH)
    - Team Dressage winners: Germany
      - Hubertus Schmidt with horse Imperio 3
      - Jessica von Bredow-Werndl with horse Unee BB
      - Isabell Werth with horse Don Johnson FRH, and
      - Kristina Bröring-Sprehe with horse Desperados FRH
  - July 9–12: Cup #5 in Falsterbo
    - Individual Dressage winner: (Sweden) Tinne Vilhelmson-Silfvén (with horse Don Auriello)
    - Team Dressage winners: Sweden
      - Emelie Nyrerod with horse Miata
      - Minna Telde with horse Santana
      - Tinne Vilmhelmson-Silfven with horse Don Auriello, and
      - Patrik Kittel with horse Deja
  - July 15–19: Cup #6 (final) in (United Kingdom) Hickstead, West Sussex
    - Individual Dressage winner: (United Kingdom) Carl Hester (with horse Wanadoo)
    - Team Dressage winners: Denmark
      - Anders Dahl with horse Wie-Atlantico de Ymas
      - Sune Hansen with horse Charmeur, and
      - Sidsel Johansen with horse Alibi D

=== FEI Nations Cup in Eventing ===
- March 19 – October 11: 2015 FEI Nations Cup Eventing Schedule
  - March 19–22: Cup #1 in Fontainebleau
    - Individual winner: (Germany) Michael Jung (with horse La Biosthetique – SAM FBW)
    - Team winners: France
      - Gwendolen Fer with horse Romantic Love
      - Arnaud Boiteau with horse Quoriano 'Ene HN'
      - Hélène Vattier with horse Quito de Baliere, and
      - Karim Laghouag with horse Entebbe de Hus
  - April 24–26: Cup #2 in (Republic of Ireland) Ballindenisk, Watergrasshill
    - Individual winner: (United Kingdom) Emilie Chandler (with horse Gino Royale)
    - Team winners: Great Britain
      - Nicky Roncoroni with horse Stonedge
      - Louise Harwood with horse Whitson
      - Georgie Strang with horse Cooley Business Time, and
      - Izzy Taylor with horse KBIS Starchaser
  - May 28–31: Cup #3 in (United Kingdom) Houghton Hall
    - Individual winner: (France) Luc Château (with horse Propriano de L'ebat)
    - Team winners: Germany
      - Andreas Ostholt with horse So Is It
      - Nicholas Bschorer with horse Tom Tom Go
      - Dirk Schrade with horse Hope & Skip, and
      - Sandra Auffarth with horse Ispo
  - June 25–28: Cup #4 in (Poland) Strzegom
    - Individual winner: (Belgium) Karin Donckers (with horse Fletcha van't Verahof)
    - Team winners: Great Britain
      - Izzy Taylor with horse KBIS Starburst
      - Sarah Bullimore with horse Valentino V
      - Emily Llewellyn with horse Greenlawn Sky High, and
      - Jodie Amos with horse Figaro van het Broekxhof
  - August 11–14: Cup #5 in Aachen
    - Individual winner: (Germany) Ingrid Klimke (with horse FRH Escada JS)
    - Team winners: Germany
      - Ingrid Klimke with horse Horseware Hale Bob
      - Sandra Auffarth with horse Opgun Louvo
      - Michael Jung with horse Halunke FBW, and
      - Dirk Schrade with horse Hop and Skip
  - September 17–20: Cup #6 in (Italy) Montelibretti
    - Event cancelled.
  - September 24–27: Cup #7 in (Belgium) Waregem
    - Individual winner: (United Kingdom) Nana Dalton (with horse Abbeylara Prince)
    - Team winners: Germany
      - Andreas Ostholt with horse Pennsylvania 28
      - Julia Krajewski with horse Samourai du Thot
      - Anna-Maria Rieke with horse Petite Dame, and
      - Andreas Dibowski with horse FRH Butts Avedon
  - October 8–11: Cup #8 in (Netherlands) Boekelo (final)
    - Individual winner: (United Kingdom) Nicola Wilson (with horse Bulana)
    - Team winners: Ireland
      - Jonty Evans with horse Cooley Rorke's Drift
      - Joseph Murphy with horse Westwinds Hercules
      - Cathal Daniels with horse Rioghan Rua, and
      - Padraig McCarthy with horse Simon Porloe

== Longines Global Champions Tour for show jumping ==
- April 2 – November 14: 2015 Global Champions Tour
  - April 2–4: Tour #1 in (United States) Miami Beach, Florida
    - Class 14: Miami Beach 2015 CSI5* 1.60m (Global Champions Tour) Winner: (United Kingdom) Scott Brash (with horse Hello Sanctos)
  - April 22–25: Tour #2 in (Belgium) Antwerp
    - Class 06: Antwerp 2015 CSI5* 1.60m (Global Champions Tour) Winner: (France) Simon Delestre (with horse Ryan des Hayettes)
  - May 1–3: Tour #3 in (Spain) Madrid
    - Class 10: Madrid 2015 CSI5* 1.60m (Global Champions Tour) Winner: (Portugal) Luciana Diniz (with horse Winningmood)
  - May 8–10: Tour #4 in (China) Shanghai
    - Class 04: Shanghai 2015 CSI5* 1.60 m (Global Champions Tour) Winner: (Netherlands) Harrie Smolders (with horse Regina Z)
  - May 14–17: Tour #5 in (Germany) Hamburg
    - Class 06: Hamburg 2015 CSI5* 1.60 m (Global Champions Tour) Winner: (United States) Kent Farrington (with horse Voyeur)
  - June 11–13: Tour #6 in (France) Cannes
    - Class 14: Cannes 2015 CSI5* 1.60 m (Global Champions Tour) Winner: (France) Penelope Leprevost (with horse Ratina d'la Rousserie)
  - June 25–27: Tour #7 in Monaco
    - Class 05: Monaco 2015 CSI5* 1.60m (Global Champions Tour) Winner: (United Kingdom) Scott Brash (with horse Hello M'Lady)
  - July 3–5: Tour #8 in (France) Paris
    - Class 11: Paris 2015 CSI5* 1.60m (Global Champions Tour) Winner: (Republic of Ireland) Bertram Allen (with horse Romanov)
  - July 9–11: Tour #9 in (Portugal) Cascais–Estoril
    - Class 04: Cascais 2015 CSI5* 1.60m (Global Champions Tour) Winner: (United Kingdom) Scott Brash (with horse Hello Sanctos)
  - July 17–19: Tour #10 in (France) Chantilly
    - Class 04: Chantilly 2015 CSI5* 1.60m (Global Champions Tour) Winner: (Belgium) Grégory Wathelet (with horse Conrad de Hus)
  - July 24–26: Tour #11 in (United Kingdom) London
    - Class 10: London 2015 CSI5* 1.60m (Global Champions Tour) Winner: (Sweden) Rolf-Göran Bengtsson (with horse Casall ASK)
  - August 13–16: Tour #12 in (Netherlands) Valkenswaard
    - Class 06: Valkenswaard 2015 CSI5* 1.60m (Global Champions Tour) Winner: (Germany) Marco Kutscher (with horse van Gogh)
  - September 11–13: Tour #13 in (Italy) Rome
    - Class 08: Rome 2015 CSI5* 1.60m (Global Champions Tour) Winner: (Sweden) Rolf-Göran Bengtsson (with horse Casall ASK)
  - September 17–20: Tour #14 in (Austria) Vienna
    - Class 04: Vienna 2015 CSI5* 1.60m (Global Champions Tour) Winner: (Portugal) Luciana Diniz (with horse Winningmood)
  - November 12–14: Tour #15 (final) in (Qatar) Doha
    - Class 05: Doha 2015 CSI5* 1.60m (Global Champions Tour) Winner: (Portugal) Luciana Diniz (with horse Fit For Fun)

== Spruce Meadows Tournaments for show jumping ==
- June 3 – September 13: 2015 Spruce Meadows Tournaments in Calgary
  - June 3–7: The National
    - Biggest Purse: C$400,000 RBC Grand Prix Presented by ROLEX
      - Winner: (United States) Kent Farrington (with horse Voyeur)
  - June 11–14: The Continental
    - Biggest Purse: C$210,000 CP Grand Prix
      - Winner: (United States) McLain Ward (with horse Rothchild)
  - June 24–28: Canada One
    - Biggest Purse: C$126,000 Imperial Challenge
      - Winner: (Egypt) Sameh El-Dahan (with horse Sumas Zorro)
  - June 30 – July 5: The North American
    - Biggest Purse: C$400,000 ATCO Power Queen Elizabeth II Cup
      - Winner: (United States) McLain Ward (with horse HH Azur)
  - July 9–12: The Pan American
    - Biggest Purse: C$400,000 Pan American Cup Presented by ROLEX
      - Winner: (United States) Kent Farrington (with horse Voyeur)
  - September 9–13: The Masters (final)
    - C$300,000 BMO Nations' Cup
      - Winners: Brazil
      - Pedro Veniss with horse Quabri de L'Isle
      - Felipe Amaral with horse Premiere Carthoes
      - Eduardo Menezes with horse Quintol, and
      - Rodrigo Pessoa with horse Status
    - Biggest Purse: C$1,500,000 CP International Grand Prix Presented by ROLEX
      - Winner: (United Kingdom) Scott Brash (with horse Hello Sanctos)

== Triple Crown of Thoroughbred Racing ==
- USA Triple Crown
  - May 2: 2015 Kentucky Derby
    - Horse: (United States) American Pharoah; Jockey: (Mexico) Victor Espinoza; Trainer: (United States) Bob Baffert
  - May 16: 2015 Preakness Stakes
    - Horse: (United States) American Pharoah; Jockey: (Mexico) Victor Espinoza; Trainer: (United States) Bob Baffert
  - June 6: 2015 Belmont Stakes
    - Horse: (United States) American Pharoah; Jockey: (Mexico) Victor Espinoza; Trainer: (United States) Bob Baffert
- Note: A new Triple Crown winner, since 1978, with horse Affirmed.
- United Kingdom Triple Crown
  - May 2: 2015 2000 Guineas Stakes
    - Horse: (Republic of Ireland) Gleneagles; Jockey: (United Kingdom) Ryan Moore; Trainer: (Republic of Ireland) Aidan O'Brien
  - June 6: 2015 Epsom Derby
    - Horse: (United Kingdom) Golden Horn; Jockey: (Italy) Frankie Dettori; Trainer: (United Kingdom) John Gosden
  - September 12: 2015 St. Leger Stakes
    - Horse: (Republic of Ireland) Bondi Beach; Jockey: (Republic of Ireland) Colm O'Donoghue; Trainer: (Republic of Ireland) Aidan O'Brien
- Canadian Triple Crown
  - July 5: 2015 Queen's Plate
    - Horse: (Canada) Shaman Ghost; Jockey: (United States) Rafael Manuel Hernandez; Trainer: (Australia) Brian A. Lynch
  - July 29: 2015 Prince of Wales Stakes
    - Horse: (Canada) Breaking Lucky; Jockey: (Canada) James S. McAleney; Trainer: (Canada) Reade Baker
  - August 16: 2015 Breeders' Stakes
    - Horse: (Canada) Danish Dynaformer; Jockey: (Barbados) Patrick Husbands; Trainer: (United Kingdom) Roger Attfield
- Australian Triple Crown
  - March 14: 2015 Randwick Guineas
    - Horse: (Australia) Hallowed Crown; Jockey: (Australia) Hugh Bowman; Trainers: (Australia) Bart Cummings and James Cummings
  - March 21: 2015 Rosehill Guineas
    - Horse: (New Zealand) Volkstok'n'barrell; Jockey: (Australia) Craig Williams; Trainer: (New Zealand) Donna Logan
  - April 4: 2015 Australian Derby
    - Horse: (Australia) Mongolian Khan; Jockey: (New Zealand) Owen Bosson; Trainer: (New Zealand) Murray Baker
- Hong Kong Triple Crown
  - January 25: 2015 Hong Kong Stewards' Cup
    - Horse: (Australia) Able Friend; Jockey: (Brazil) João Moreira; Trainer: (Australia) John Moore
  - March 1: 2015 Hong Kong Gold Cup
    - Horse: (Republic of Ireland) Designs On Rome; Jockey: (Brazil) João Moreira; Trainer: (Australia) John Moore
  - May 31: 2015 Hong Kong Champions & Chater Cup
    - Horse: (United States) Helene Super Star; Jockey: (South Africa) Douglas Whyte; Trainer: (Hong Kong) Anthony S. Cruz

== Other equestrian events ==
- July 1–5: FEI Dressage Children, Junior & Under 21 European Championships 2015 in (France) Vidauban
  - Open Junior Individual Test Dressage winner: (Germany) Hannah Erbe with horse Carlos
  - Open Under 21 Individual Test Dressage winner: (Netherlands) Dana van Lierop with horse Equestricons Walkuere
  - Open Children Individual Test Dressage winner: (Denmark) Sofia Valentina Hegstrup with horse Santa
  - Open Junior Individual Dressage Freestyle winner: (Spain) Juan Matute Guimon with horse Dhannie Ymas
  - Open Under 21 Individual Dressage Freestyle winner: (Germany) Bianca Nowag with horse Fair Play RB
  - Open Junior Team Dressage winners: Germany (Paulina Holzknecht with horse Wells Fargo, Kristin Biermann with horse Zwetcher, Semmieke Rothenberger with horse Geisha, Hannah Erbe with horse Carlos)
  - Open Under 21 Team Dressage winners: Germany (Claire-Louise Averkorn with horse Condio B, Vivien Niemann with horse Don Vertino, Anna-Christina Abbelen with horse Fuerst On Tour, Bianca Nowag with horse Fair Play RB)
  - Open Children Team Dressage winners: Switzerland (Jorina Miehling with horse Rising Star, Annina Lüthi with horse Odin III, Meiling Ngovan with horse Don Paulo)
