= Fabienne Müller-Lütkemeier =

German dressage rider

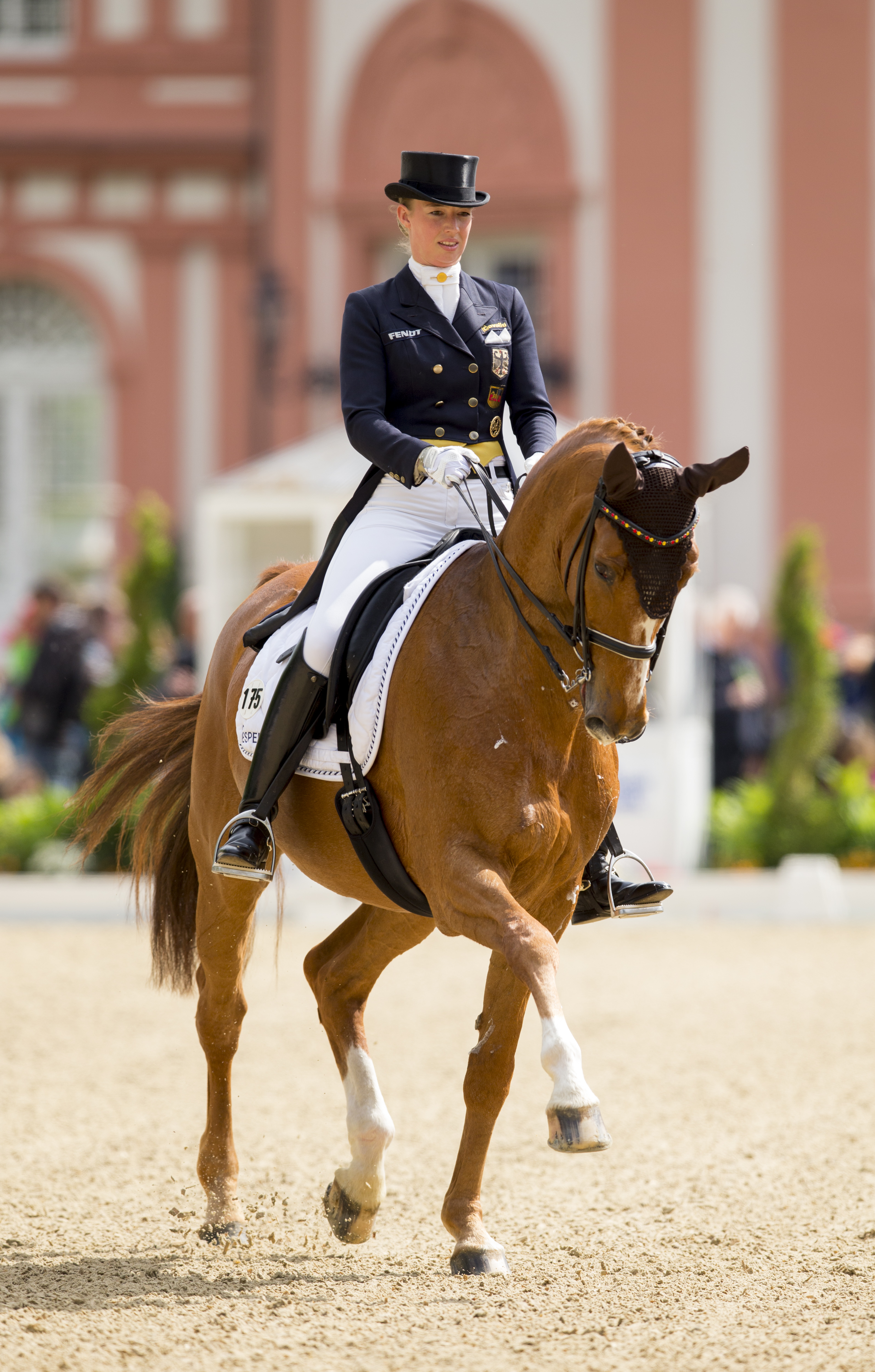
- Fabienne Lütkemeier and Qui Vincit Dynamis. (Photo: WRFC/Lafrentz)

Personal information
- Born: 28 October 1989 (age 35); Paderborn, West Germany

Website
- fabienne-luetkemeier.de
Medal record
Equestrian
Representing Germany
World Championships
Gold medal – first place	2014 Normandy	Team dressage
European Championships
Gold medal – first place	2013 Herning	Team dressage

Fabienne Müller-Lütkemeier (born 28 October 1989 in Paderborn, West Germany) is a German dressage rider. Representing Germany, she has won gold medals in team dressage at the 2013 European Dressage Championship in Herning and at the 2014 World Equestrian Games in Normandy. Meanwhile, her current best individual championship result is 10th from the European Championships in 2013.

Lütkemeier also competed at two editions of World Cup Finals (in 2015 and 2016). At the 2015 edition she placed 10th aboard Qui Vincit Dynamis. The following year she placed 6th aboard D'Agostino.

She is a niece of Nadine Capellmann, 2002 World Champion in dressage and the daughter of Gina Capellmann, a multiple championship medalist.

== Dressage results ==
=== World Championships ===
1 medal (1 gold, 0 silver, 0 bronze)

Event	Team	Individual	Freestyle	Horse
(France) 2014 Normandy	Gold	19th	—	D'Agostino

=== European Championships ===
1 medal (1 gold, 0 silver, 0 bronze)

Event	Team	Individual	Freestyle	Horse
(Denmark) 2013 Herning	Gold	9th	10th	D'Agostino

=== World Cup ===
==== Final ====
Event	Score	Rank	Horse
(United States) 2015 Las Vegas	74.804%	10th	Qui Vincit Dynamis
(Sweden) 2016 Gothenburg	78.339%	6th	D'Agostino
(United States) 2017 Omaha	Withdrew		

==== Western European League ====
Season	Points	Rank
2013-14	48	8th
2014-15	64	3rd Q
2015-16	50	9th Q
2016-17	54	5th Q
2017-18	50	10th
2018-19	51	10th

- Q - denotes qualification for the World Cup Final

==== Western European League podiums ====
5 podiums (1 gold, 2 silver, 2 bronze)

Season	Place	Placement	Horse
2014-15	(France) Lyon	2nd	D'Agostino
2014-15	(Germany) Stuttgart	1st	D'Agostino
2014-15	(Germany) Neumünster	2nd	D'Agostino
2015-16	(France) Lyon	3rd	D'Agostino
2016-17	(Germany) Stuttgart	3rd	D'Agostino

== Personal bests ==
Personal bests as of January 2019
Event	Score	Horse	Venue	Date
Grand Prix	76.460	D'Agostino	Lyon, France	October 30, 2014
Grand Prix Special	76.549	D'Agostino	Perl, Germany	June 29, 2014
Grand Prix Freestyle	80.775	D'Agostino	Neumünster, Germany	February 15, 2015
