= Emilie Nyreröd =

Swedish dressage rider

Personal information
- Born: 30 August 1987 (age 39)

Emilie Nyreröd (born 30 August 1987) is a Swedish dressage rider. She represented Sweden at the 2015 European Dressage Championships in Aachen, Germany where she finished 5th in team dressage and 22nd in the individual dressage competition.

Emilie also competed at the 2016 edition of the Dressage World Cup Final in Gothenburg, Sweden, where she achieved 14th position.
