= Gina Capellmann =

German equestrian

Personal information
- Born: February 15, 1960 (age 65); Würselen, Germany
Medal record
Equestrian
Representing Germany
World Championships
Gold medal – first place	1986 Cedar Valley	Team dressage
European Championships
Gold medal – first place	1987 Goodwood	Team dressage

Gina Capellmann-Lütkemeier (born February 15, 1960, in Würselen) is a German equestrian and trainer. She won a golden team medal in team dressage at the 1986 World Dressage Championships in Cedar Valley and a golden team medal at the 1987 European Dressage Championships in Goodwood.

Capellmann is the older sister of Olympic, World and European Champion Nadine Capellmann and mother of Fabienne Müller-Lütkemeier, who was part of the golden team at the 2014 FEI World Equestrian Games and the 2013 European Dressage Championships and also served as reserve member for the German team during the 2012 Olympics.
