= Wim Ernes =

Willem Egidius Johannes "Wim" Ernes (2 July 1958 – Schimmert, 1 November 2016) was a Dutch equestrian dressage coach from Schimmert. Ernes was seen as an icon within the Dutch equestrian sport. He was twice the coach of the Dutch national dressage team, his first from 1993 to 1996 and the second from 2013. During his first period the Dutch dressage team won the silver medal at the 1994 World Championships and the silver medal at the 1996 Summer Olympics. During his second period the Dutch dressage team won the silver medal at the 2013 European Championships, the bronze medal at the 2014 World Championships and gold at the 2015 European Championships.

In December 2015 he had an epileptic attack due to a brain tumor. He left hospital in January 2016. He was able do things independently, but had to rest. He had quit his job as national coach and was not able to go to the 2016 Summer Olympics. Johan Rockx took over his position. For all of his work Ernes was honoured with the gouden speld (golden pin) by the Dutch National Equestrian Federation (KNHS) on 31 October 2016. The day afterwards, on 1 November Ernes died at the age of 58. The team that won the gold medal at the 2015 European Championships, Edward Gal, Hans Peter Minderhoud, Diederik van Silfhout and Patrick van der Meer carried his coffin during his funeral on 5 November 2016.

== Personal ==
Ernes lived in Schimmert, was married and had a daughter in 1988 called Maud.
