= Slanec (surname) =

Slanec is a surname. Notable people with the surname include:

- Alexandra Slanec (born 1986), Austrian dressage rider
- Gustav Slanec (1913–1974), Austrian speed skater
