= Astrid Neumayer =

Austrian equestrian

Personal information
- Born: 17 February 1982 (age 44)

Astrid Neumayer (born 17 February 1982) is an Austrian dressage rider. She represented Austria at the 2015 European Dressage Championships in Aachen, Germany where she finished 9th in team dressage and 36th in the individual dressage competition.

She is coached by German Olympian Ulla Salzgeber.
