= Danielle Heijkoop =

Dutch dressage rider (born 1987)

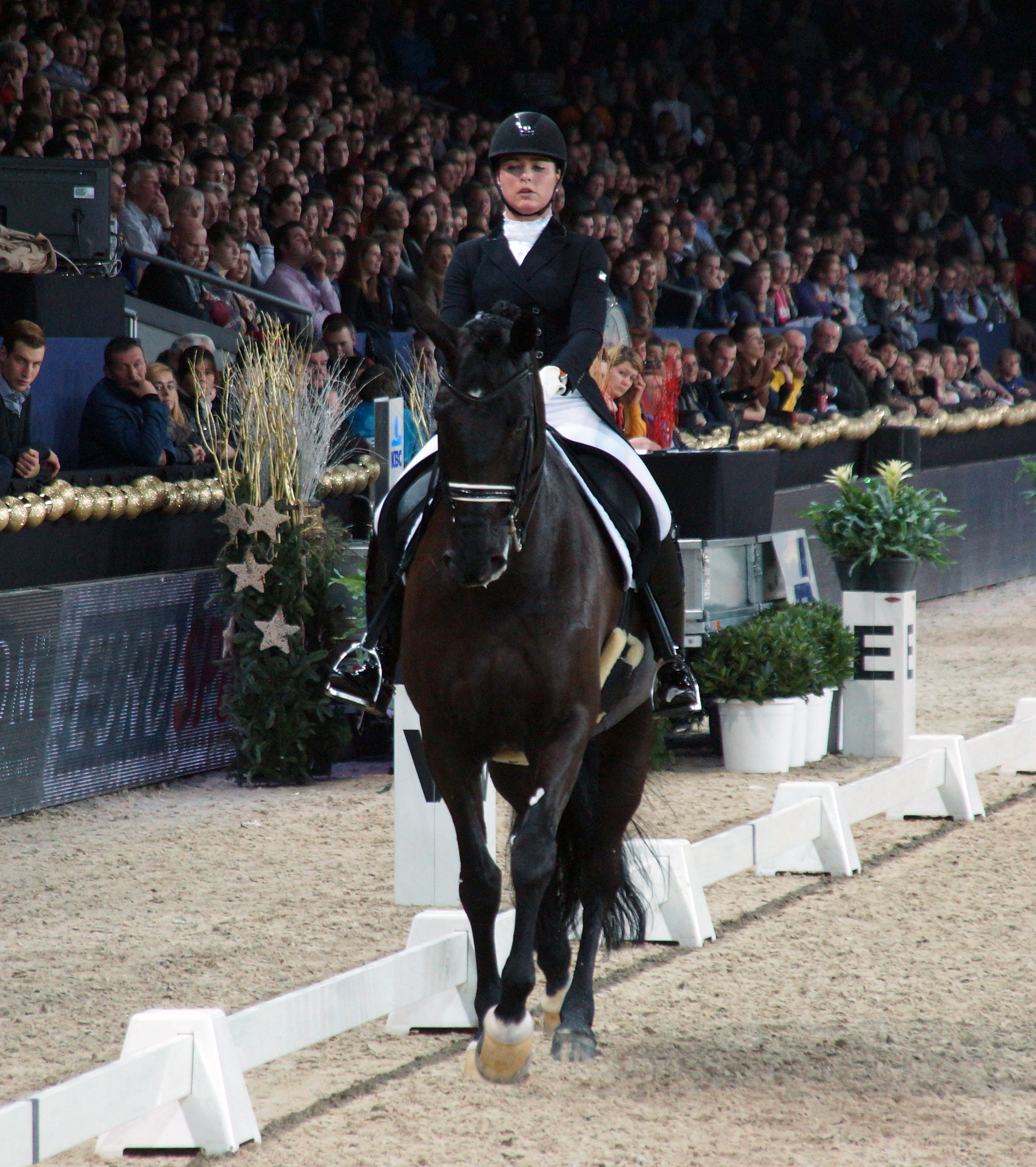
- Danielle Heijkoop and Siro (2013)

Personal information
- Born: 16 April 1987 (age 39) Rotterdam
Medal record
Equestrian
Representing Netherlands
European Championships
Silver medal – second place	2013 Herning	Team dressage

Danielle Heijkoop (born 16 April 1987) is a Dutch dressage rider.

She won silver medal at the 2013 European Dressage Championship in the team competition. She has qualified for the 2014 Dressage World Cup Final in Lyon after finishing 9th overall in the 2013/14 Western European League rankings.
