= Pieter Eijssen =

Dutch lawyer (1906–1988)

Pieter Eijsen

Vice President of the Supreme Court of the Netherlands
- In office 1973–1976

Councilor in the Supreme Court of the Netherlands
- In office 1961–1973

Advocate general in the Supreme Court of the Netherlands
- In office 1960–1961

Personal details
- Born: 15 February 1906 Schimmert, Netherlands
- Died: 30 June 1988 (aged 82) The Hague, Netherlands
- Education: University of Nijmegen

Pieter Eijssen (Schimmert, 15 February 1906 – The Hague, 30 June 1988) was a Dutch lawyer and, among other things, Vice President of the Supreme Court of the Netherlands.

In 1924 he completed his education at the municipal gymnasium in Maastricht. He studied at the University of Nijmegen, where he obtained his doctorate in Dutch law cum laude on 30 May 1930. After entering military service at the age of 16 he successfully completed his master's degree in private law at the Faculty of Law in Batavia in 1931. From 1930 he worked in the Dutch East Indies. He held many positions including editor at the Department of Justice, secretary of the commission for constitutional reforms (from 1940), secretary of the Council of Heads of Department at the Department of Economic Affairs and the General Staff of the Department of War (1936–1940), secretary of the (private) Mortgage Association for mortgage companies, secretary of the Volksraad voting office, vice-chairman of the Indies Catholic Party and member of the Insurance Chamber (1946). Furthermore, in 1936, the Government expressed its special satisfaction to him for the commendable performance of his duties as Secretary of the Preparatory Commission for the Sugar Regulations.

He was Advocate general at the Supreme Court of the Netherlands from 1960 until 1961. In this capacity, among other things, he argued against the use of preliminary references. Eijsen was Councilor in the Supreme Court of the Netherlands from 1961 to 1973 and Vice President of the Supreme Court from 1973 to 1976.

== Sources ==
- P.J. van Koppen & J. ten Kate, De Hoge Raad in persoon. Benoemingen in de Hoge Raad der Nederlanden 1838-2002, Deventer: Kluwer 2003, p. 147.
