= Rikke Svane =

Danish equestrian

Personal information
- Born: January 26, 1974 (age 52) Aarhus, Denmark

Rikke Svane (born 26 January 1976) is a Danish dressage rider Rikke competed at the 2018 World Equestrian Games and at the 2015 European Dressage Championships with her black Trakhener stallion Finckenstein TSF. She is based in Denmark.
