= Alexandra Slanec =

Austrian equestrian

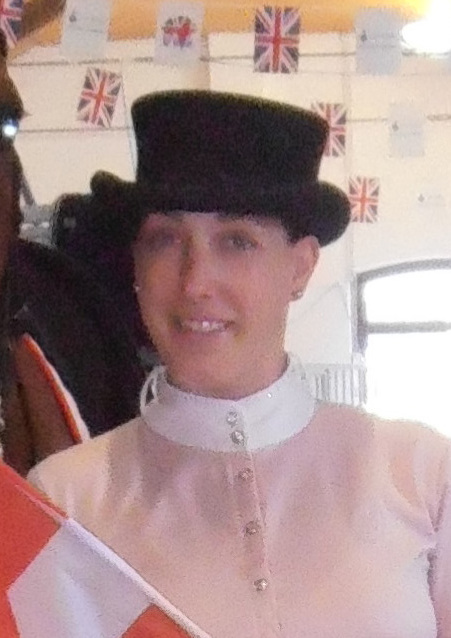
- Alexandra Slanec, in 2015

Personal information
- Born: 9 December 1986 (age 39) Vienna, Austria
Medal record
Equestrian
Representing Austria
European Young Riders Championships
Bronze medal – third place	2006 Stadl Paura	Team dressage

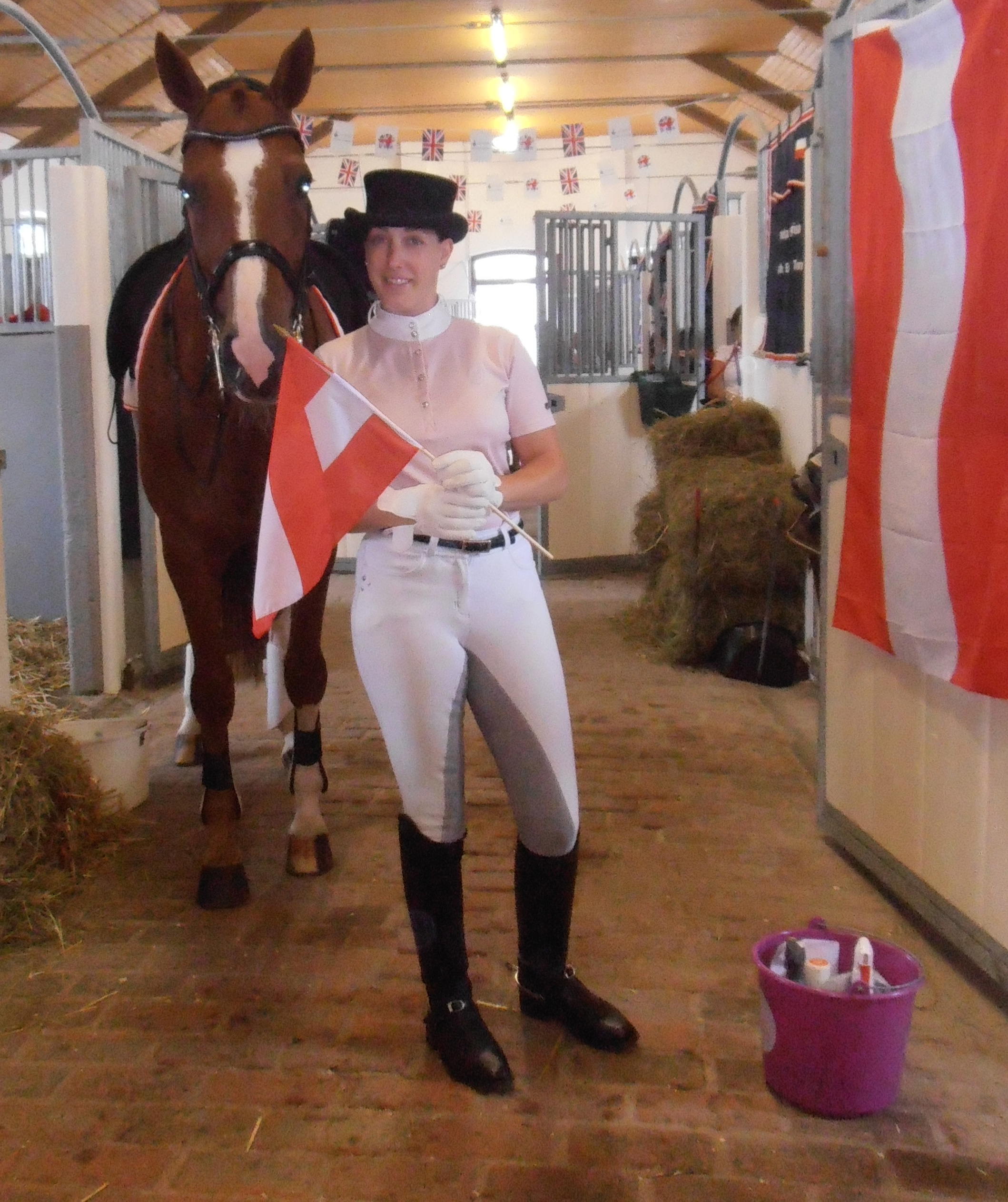
Alexandra Slanec Aachen European Championships 2015 Dressage Team

Alexandra Slanec (born 9 December 1986 in Vienna, Austria) is an Austrian dressage rider. She represented Austria at the 2015 European Dressage Championships in Aachen, Germany where she finished 9th in team dressage and 51st in the individual dressage competition.
