= Schimmert =

Schimmert Sjömmert
- Village
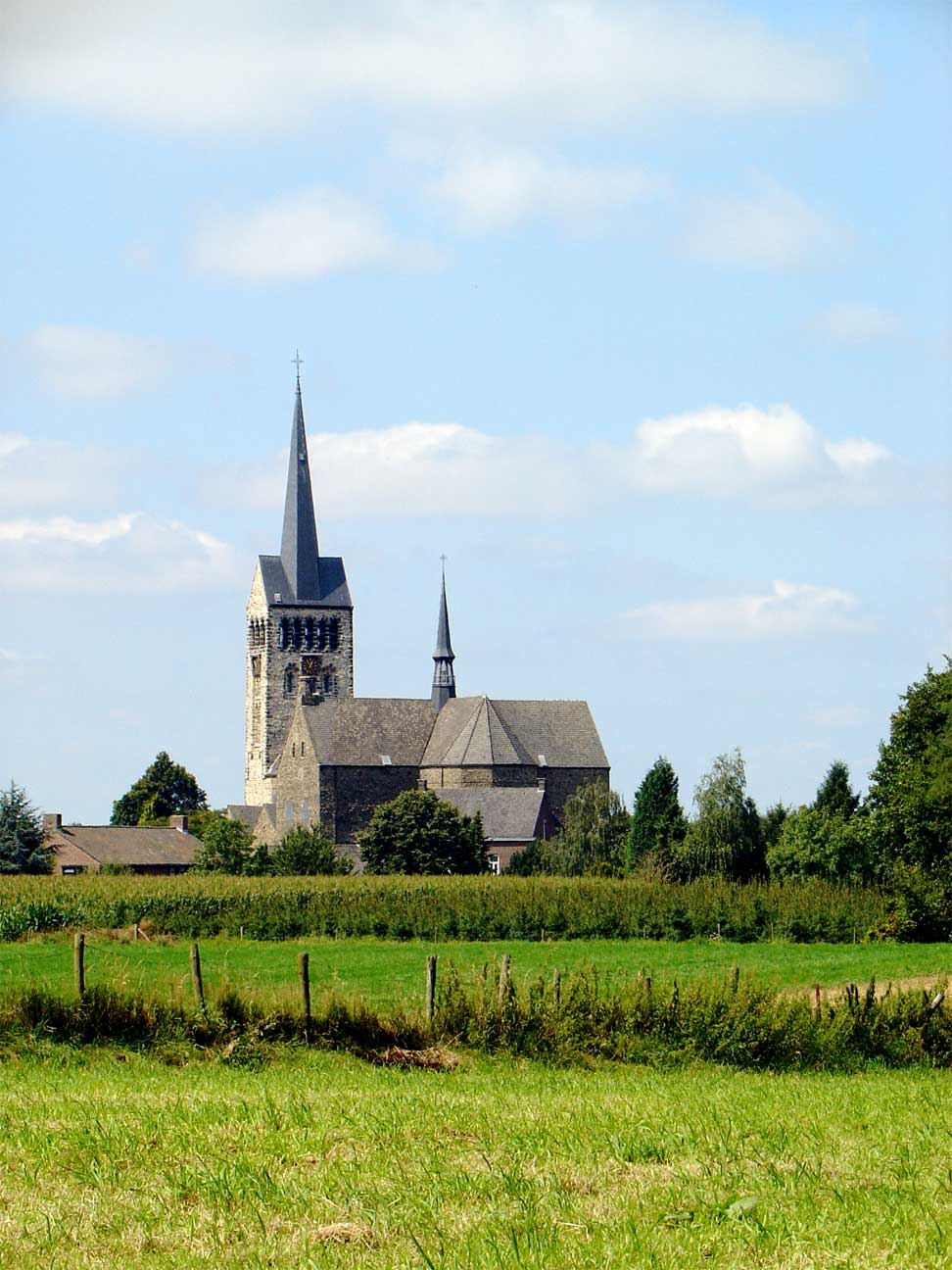
- Remigiuskerk te Schimmert

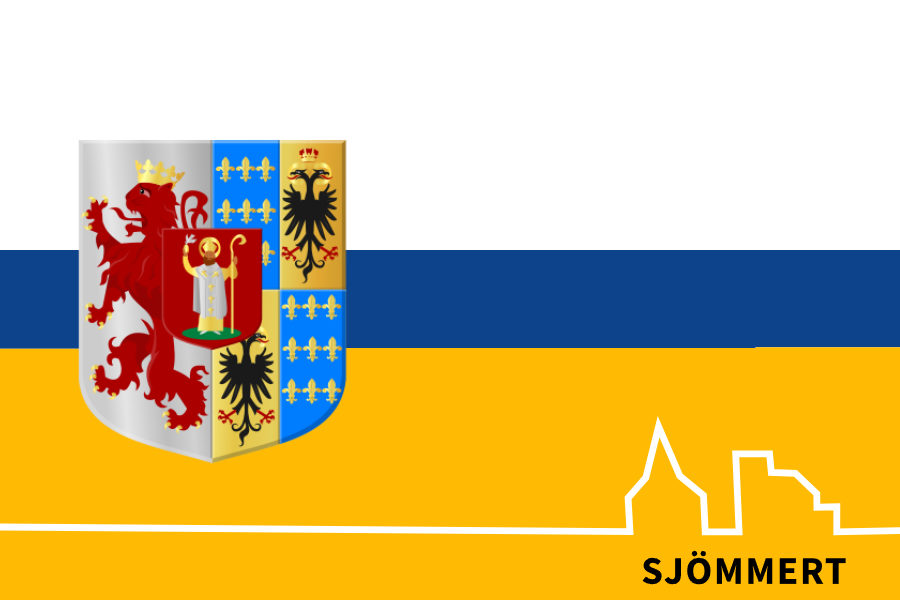
- Flag Coat of arms

- Location in the Netherlands Location in the province of Limburg in the Netherlands
- Coordinates: 50°54′20″N 5°49′19″E
- Country: Netherlands
- Province: Limburg
- Municipality: Beekdaelen

Area
  - Total: 3.75 km^{2} (1.45 sq mi)
- Elevation: 129 m (423 ft)

Population (2021)
  - Total: 2,275
  - Density: 607/km^{2} (1,570/sq mi)
- Time zone: UTC+1 (CET)
  - Summer (DST): UTC+2 (CEST)
- Postal code: 6333
- Dialing code: 045

Schimmert (Dutch pronunciation: [ˈsxɪmərt]; Limburgish: Sjömmert [ˈʃœməʀt]) is a village in the Dutch province of Limburg. It is located in the municipality of Beekdaelen.

== History ==
The village was first mentioned in the mid-11th century as "de Scinmottera". The etymology is unclear. Schimmert is a village with a dries (type of village square).

The Catholic St Remigius Church is a three-aisled church from irregular blocks of chalk constructed in 1924-1926 after a design by Pierre Cuypers and Joseph Cuypers. The tower was damaged during World War II and repaired in 1956.

The water tower was built between 1926 and 1927 on the highest point of the plateau in Expressionist style. The tower measures 38 metres (125 ft). In 1935, matching worker's houses were added.

Schimmert was home to 215 people in 1840. Schimmert was a separate municipality until 1982, when it was merged with Nuth. In 2019, it became part of Beekdaelen.

== Gallery ==
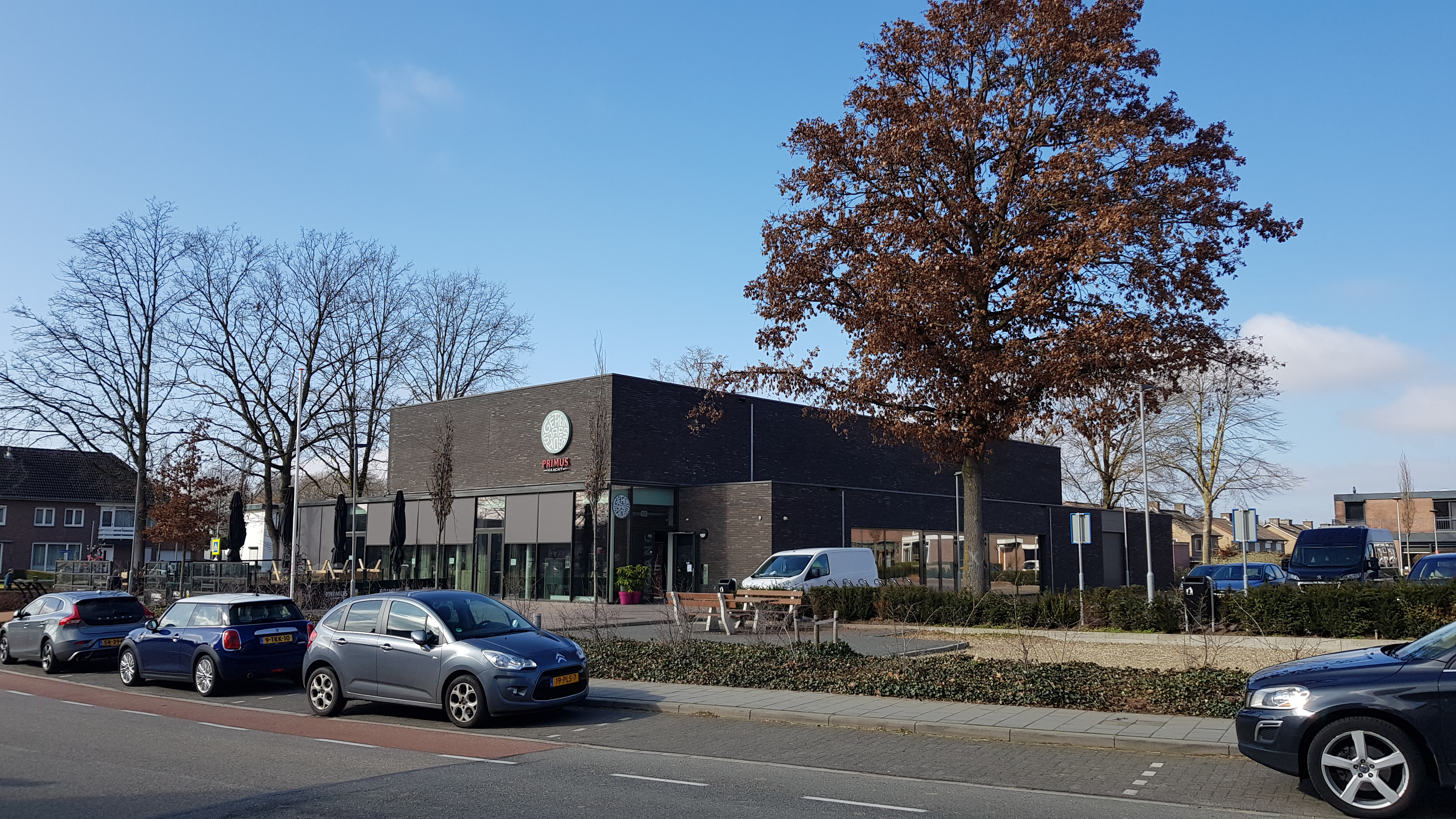
Community house

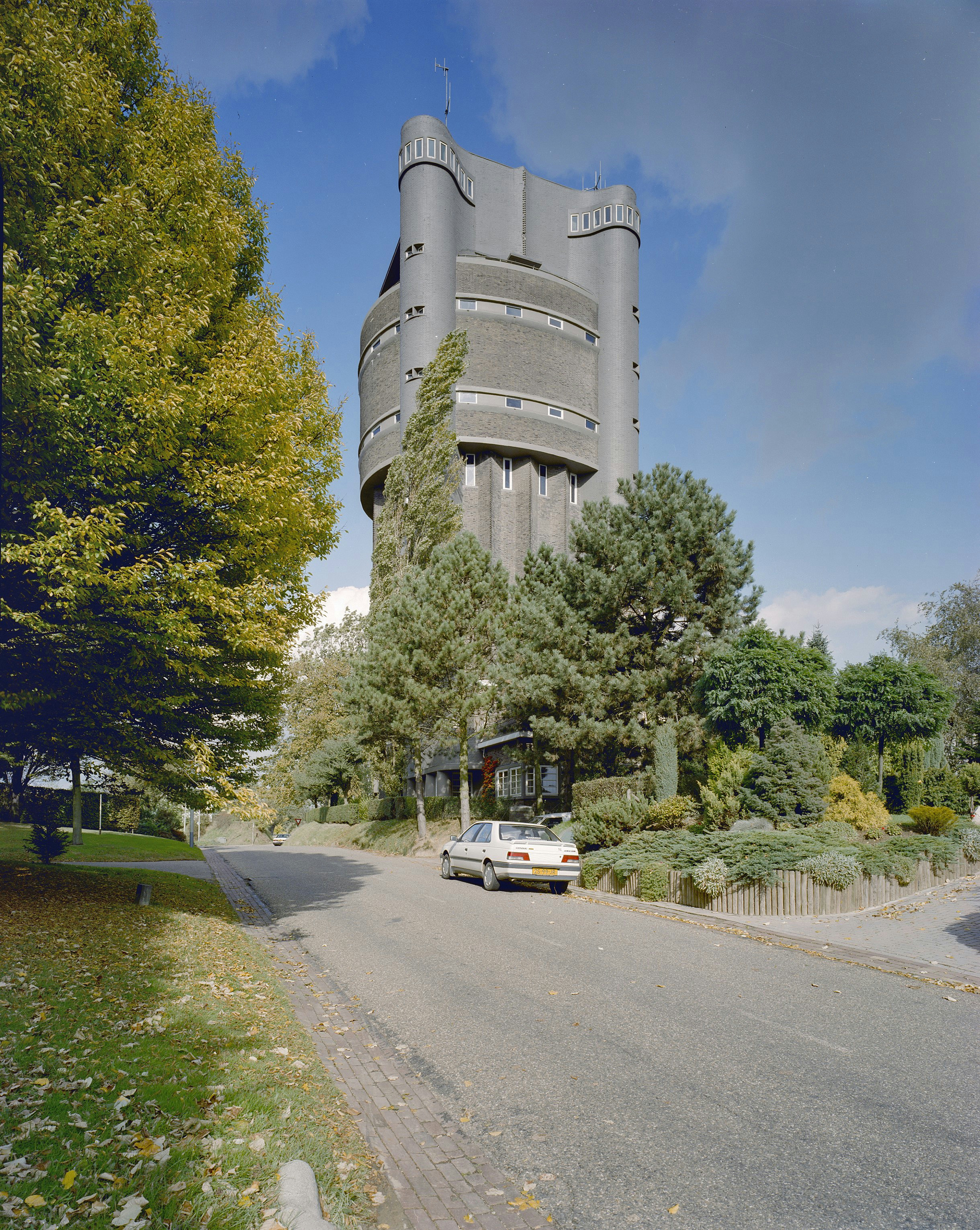
Water tower

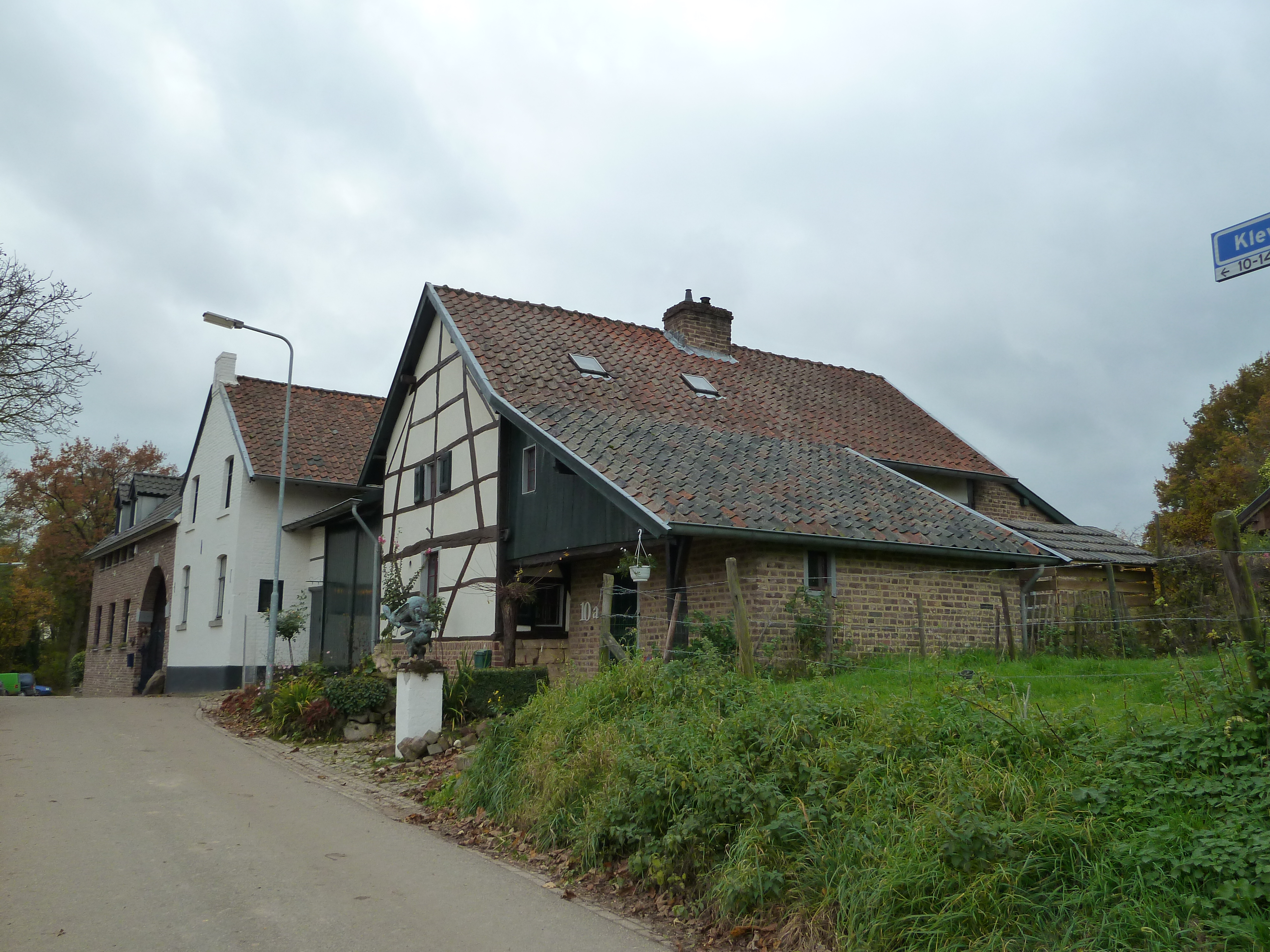
Farm

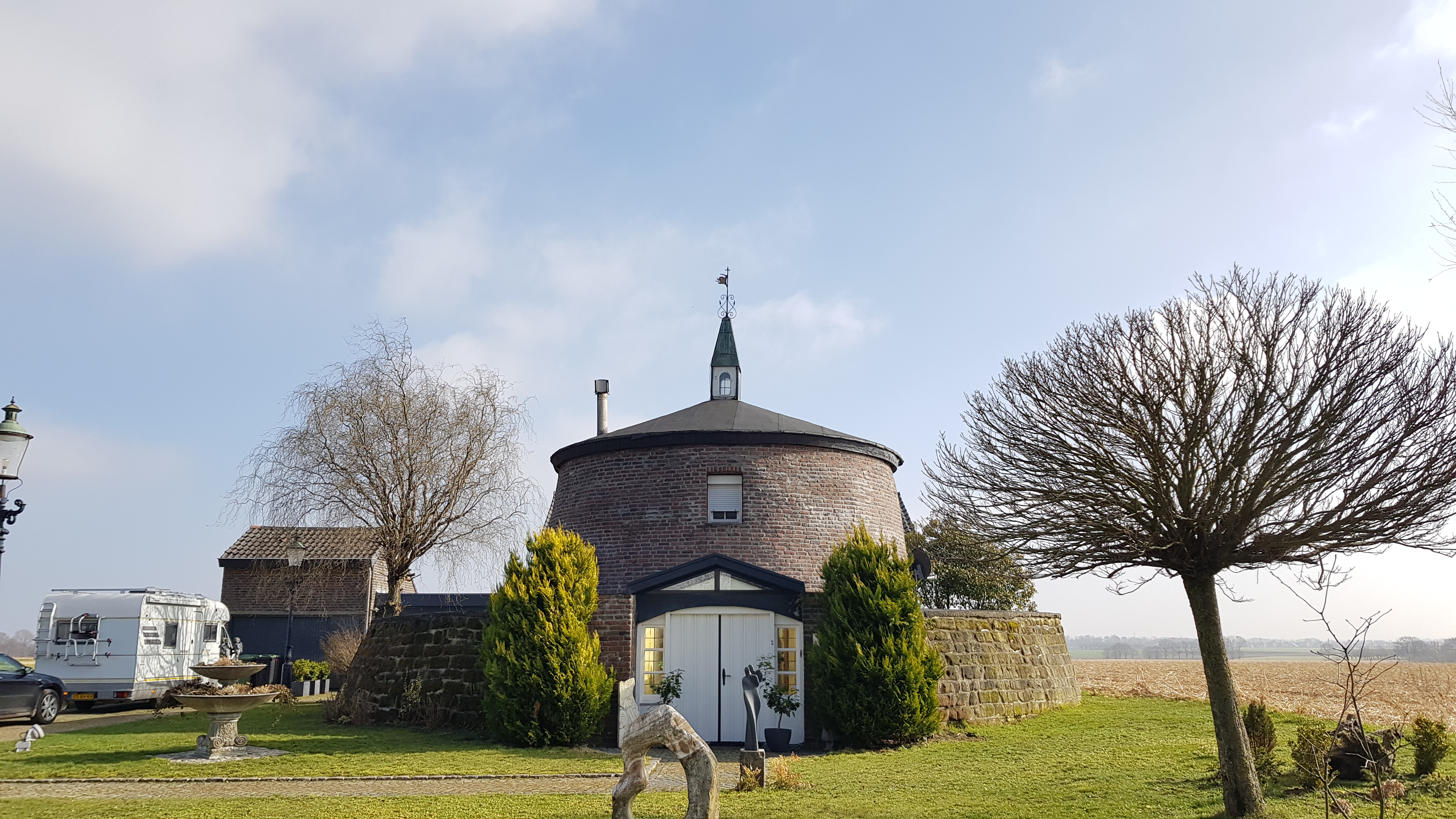
Remnant of a wind mill

== Notable people ==
- Pieter Eijssen, Dutch lawyer (1906–1988)
- Wim Ernes, equestrian dressage coach (1958–2016)
- Charles Eyck, visual artist (1897–1983)
- Otto Hermans, politician (born 1950)
- Guillaume Lemmens, Bishop of Roermond, Archbishop of Samsat (1884–1960)
- Jean-Nicolas Lemmens, Bishop of Victoria, Vancouver Island, Canada
- Jan Theunissen, Bishop of Giufi, Metropolitan bishop of Blantyre, Archbishop of Bavagaliana and Skálholt (1905–1979)
