= Diederik van Silfhout =

Dutch dressage rider (born 1988)

Personal information
- Born: 20 April 1988 (age 38) Ede, Netherlands
Medal record
Equestrian
Representing Netherlands
World Championships
Bronze medal – third place	2014 Normandy	Team dressage
European Championships
Gold medal – first place	2015 Aachen	Team dressage

Diederik van Silfhout (born 20 April 1988 in Ede, Netherlands) is a Dutch Olympic dressage rider. Representing the Netherlands, he competed at the 2016 Summer Olympics where he placed 4th in the team and 11th in the individual competitions.

Van Silfhout also competed at the 2014 World Equestrian Games in Normandy, France, where he won a team bronze medal and placed 9th in the freestyle dressage competition. He competed in Normandy as a late replacement for Danielle Heijkoop, who was forced to withdraw after her horse sustained injury.

He also competed at the 2015 European Dressage Championships in Aachen where he won a gold medal in team dressage. The Dutch national dressage coach Wim Ernes died on 1 November 2016 due to a brain tumor. Van Silfhout, together with the other gold medal winners Patrick van der Meer, Edward Gal and Hans Peter Minderhoud, carried his coffin during the funeral on 5 November 2016.

== Personal bests ==
Personal bests as of March 2016
Event	Score	Horse	Venue	Date
Grand Prix	77.460	Arlando	Amsterdam, Netherlands	January 29, 2016
Grand Prix Special	77.098	Arlando	Rotterdam, Netherlands	June 20, 2015
Grand Prix Freestyle	82.750	Arlando	Amsterdam, Netherlands	January 30, 2016
