= Jorinde Verwimp =

Belgian dressage rider

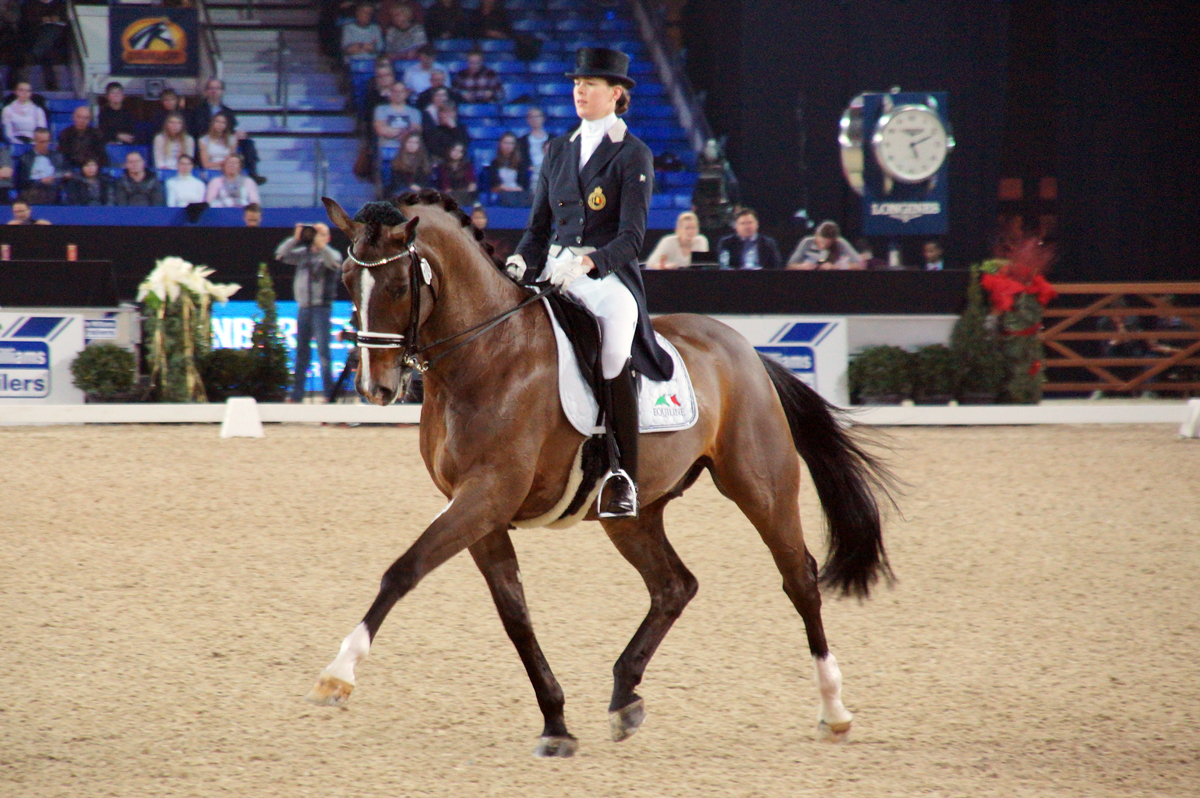
- Verwimp in 2015

Personal information
- Born: 10 November 1994 (age 31)
Medal record
Equestrian
Representing Belgium
European Young Riders Championships
Bronze medal – third place	2013 Compiegne	Team dressage
Bronze medal – third place	2014 Arezzo	Freestyle dressage

Jorinde Verwimp (born 10 November 1994) is a Belgian Olympic dressage rider. Representing Belgium, she competed at the 2016 Summer Olympics in Rio de Janeiro where she finished 36th in the individual competition.

Verwimp also competed at the 2015 European Dressage Championships where she achieved 10th place in the team and 17th place in the individual competitions. She won two medals at European young riders championships.
