= Helen Langehanenberg =

German dressage rider (born 1982)

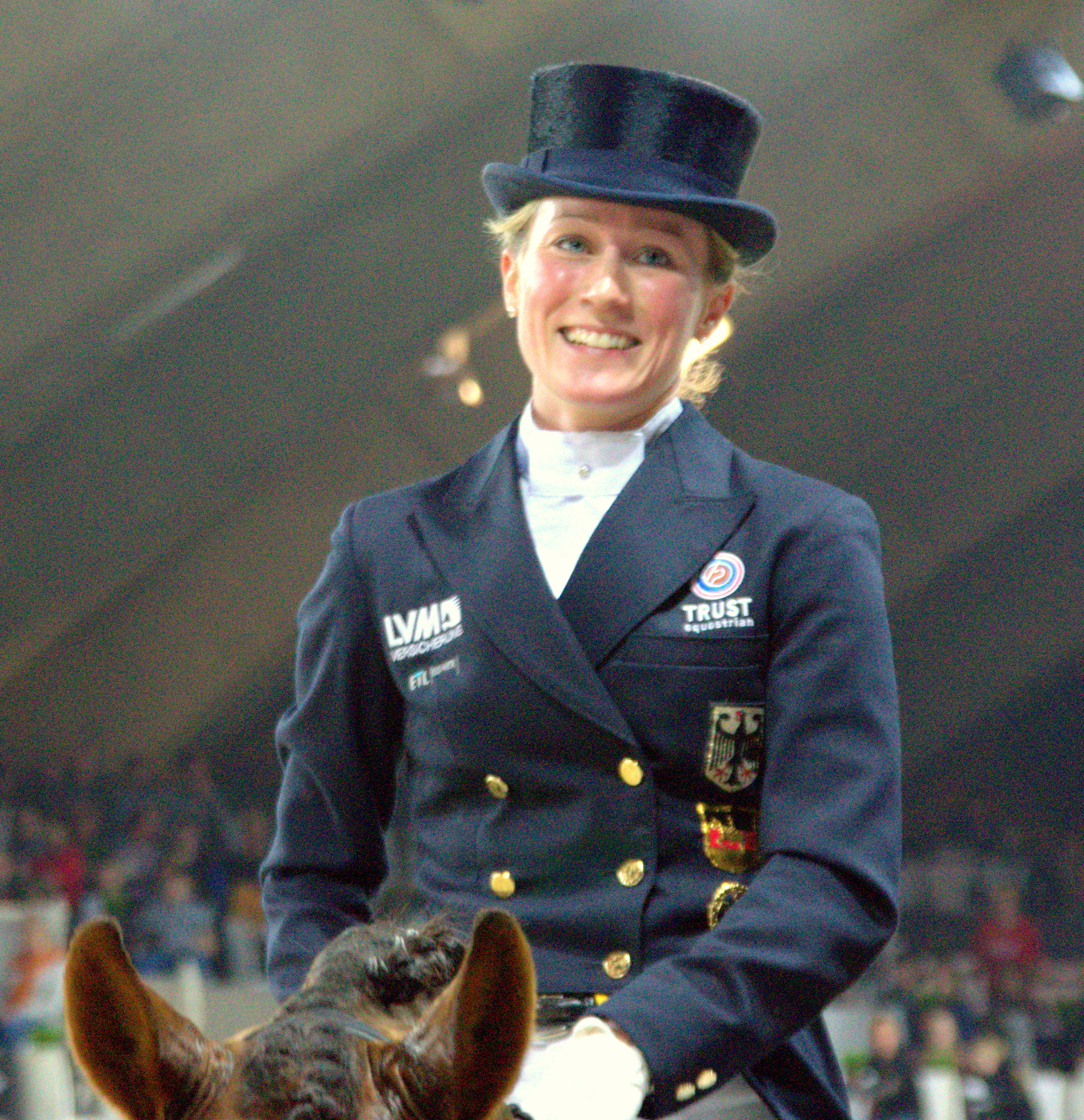
- Langehanenberg in 2012

Personal information
- Nationality: German
- Born: 21 May 1982 (age 44) Münster, West Germany

Sport
- Country: Germany
- Sport: Equestrian
Medal record
Equestrian
Representing Germany
Olympic Games
| Silver medal – second place | 2012 London | Team dressage |
World Championships
| Gold medal – first place | 2014 Normandy | Team dressage |
| Silver medal – second place | 2014 Normandy | Spécial dressage |
| Silver medal – second place | 2014 Normandy | Freestyle dressage |
European Championships
| Gold medal – first place | 2013 Herning | Team dressage |
| Gold medal – first place | 2017 Gothenburg | Team dressage |
| Gold medal – first place | 2021 Hagen | Team dressage |
| Silver medal – second place | 2011 Rotterdam | Team dressage |
| Silver medal – second place | 2013 Herning | Special dressage |
| Silver medal – second place | 2013 Herning | Freestyle dressage |
World Cup
| Gold medal – first place | 2013Gothenburg | Individual dressage |
| Silver medal – second place | 2012 Den Bosch | Individual dressage |
| Silver medal – second place | 2014 Lyon | Individual dressage |
| Bronze medal – third place | 2019 Gothenburg | Individual dressage |

Helen Langehanenberg (born 21 May 1982 in Münster) is a German dressage rider competing at Olympic level. On 7 August 2012 Langehanenberg, riding Damon Hill, was a member of the team which won the silver medal in the team dressage event.
