= 2014 FEI World Cup Finals (show jumping and dressage) =

Horse sport competition

The 2014 FEI World Cup Finals in Lyon was held between April 17 and April 21, 2014. It was the final of the Show jumping and Dressage World Cup series. The finals were held in the Lyon Euroexpo. For the first time since 1987, the Show Jumping World Cup Final was held in France while the Dressage World Cup Final had not been held in France since 1991.

== Winners ==
=== Dressage Grand Prix ===
On April 19, 2014 (15:00) the Grand Prix was held. It was the first competition of the Dressage World Cup final, but it did not count for the final ranking. Every rider competing in the Grand Prix qualified for the Grand Prix Freestyle. Denmark's Nanna Skodborg Merrald was scheduled to compete, but had to withdraw after her horse failed to pass the veterinary test.

Placing	Rider	Horse	Percentage
1	(United Kingdom) Charlotte Dujardin	Valegro	87.129 %
2	(Germany) Helen Langehanenberg	Damon Hill NRW	83.343 %
3	(Netherlands) Edward Gal	Glock's Undercover	79.957 %

=== Dressage Grand Prix Freestyle ===
The second competition of the Dressage World Cup final was the Grand Prix Freestyle, held on the afternoon of Sunday, April 21. Charlotte Dujardin won her first World Cup title with Valegro. Dujardin also set the new highest winning score, becoming the first rider to score above 90% at the World Cup final.

Placing	Rider	Horse	Percentage
1	(United Kingdom) Charlotte Dujardin	Valegro	92.176%
2	(Germany) Helen Langehanenberg	Damon Hill NRW	87.339%
3	(Netherlands) Edward Gal	Glock's Undercover	83.696%

=== Show jumping Final I ===
The first competition of the Show Jumping World Cup Final, a speed and handiness competition, was held at Friday evening (April 18, 2014). The results of this competition were converted into faults for the World Cup Final standings.

Placing	Rider	Horse	Time	World Cup Points
1	(Switzerland) Pius Schwizer	Quidam du Vivier	63.37 s + 0 penalty s = 63.37	41
2	(France) Patrice Delaveau	Lacrimoso HDC	63.67 s + 0 penalty s. = 63.67	39
3	(Germany) Ludger Beerbaum	Chaman	65.54 s + 0 penalty s. = 65.54	38

Last year final winner Beezie Madden had one obstacle fault in the speed and handiness competition, so she had a result of 68.55 seconds and was placed 12th after the first round.

=== Show jumping Final II ===
On the April 19 evening the second competition of the Show Jumping World Cup Final was held, a show jumping competition with one jump-off. After the second round, the World Cup Points were converted in Penalties for the Final Round.

Placing	Rider	Horse	Round 1		Jump-off		World Cup Points (only from the World Cup Final)
Placing	Rider	Horse	Penalties	Time (s)	Penalties	Time (s)	World Cup Points (only from the World Cup Final)
1	(United States) Kent Farrington	Voyeur	0	-	0	39.69	41
2	(Switzerland) Steve Guerdat	Nino des Buissonnets	0	-	0	40.29	39
3	(United States) Beezie Madden	Simon	0	-	0	40.35	38
