= Patrick van der Meer =

Dutch equestrian

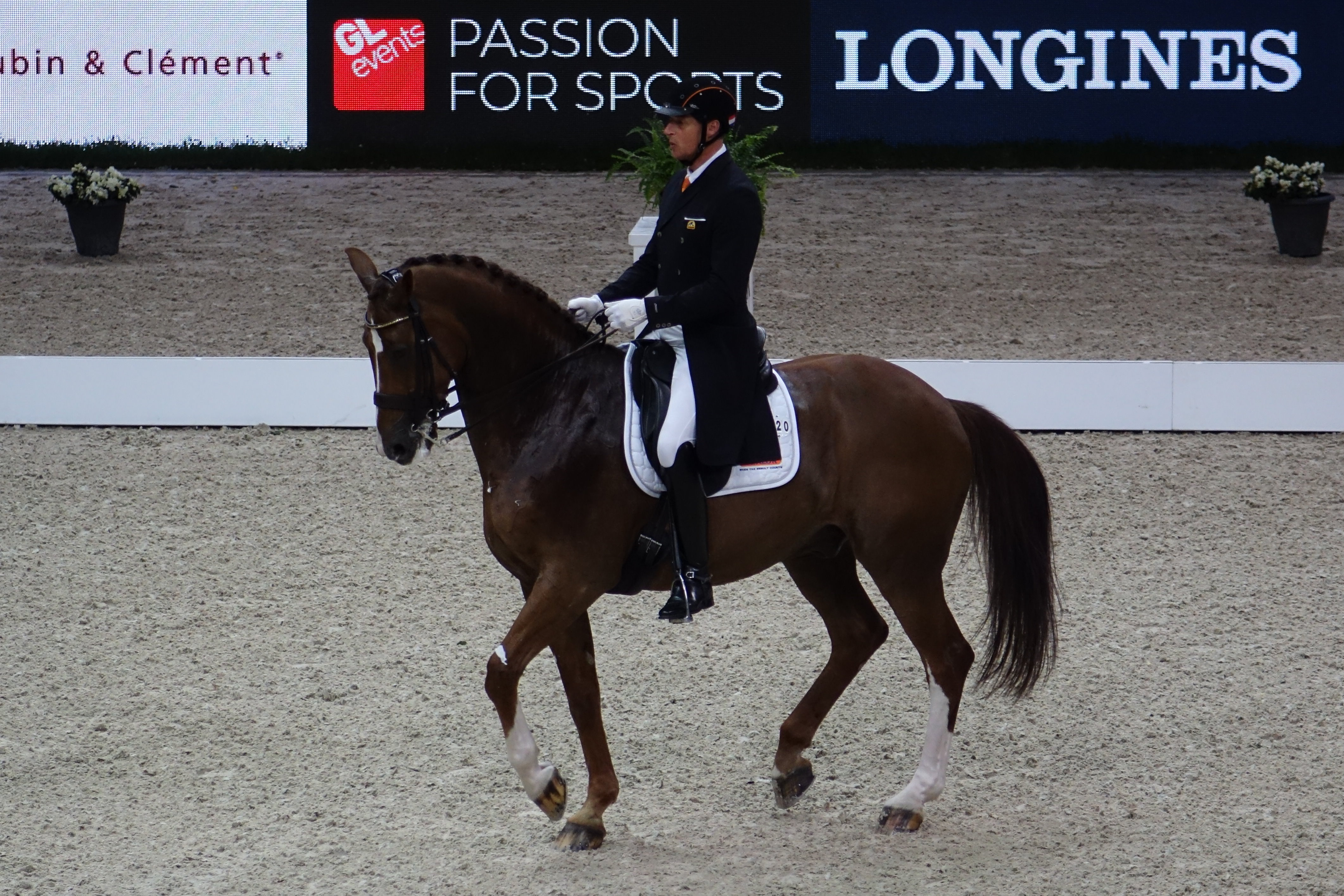

Personal information
- Born: March 23, 1971 (age 55) Wateringen, South Holland, Netherlands
Medal record
Equestrian
Representing the Netherlands
European Championships
| Gold medal – first place | 2015 Aachen | Team dressage |

Patrick van der Meer (born 23 March 1971) is a Dutch Olympic dressage rider. Representing the Netherlands, he competed at the 2012 Summer Olympics in London where he finished 32nd in the individual competition.

He also competed at the 2015 European Dressage Championships in Aachen where he won a gold medal in team dressage and finished 11th in the freestyle dressage competition. The Dutch national dressage coach Wim Ernes died on 1 November 2016 due to a brain tumor. Van der Meer, together with the other gold medal winners Edward Gal, Hans Peter Minderhoud and Diederik van Silfhout, carried his coffin during the funeral on 5 November 2016.
