= Florencio (horse) =

Dressage horse

- Breed: Westphalian
- Sire: Florestan I (Rhinelander)
- Grandsire: Fidelio (Hanoverian)
- Dam: Walessa (Westphalian)
- Maternal grandsire: Weltmeyer (Hanoverian)
- Sex: Stallion
- Foaled: 1999
- Died: May 4, 2016
- Colour: Dark Bay
- Breeder: Susanne Sanal
- Owner: Bosch brothers (33% share) & Henk Nijhoff (66% share)

Major wins
- 2004 World Young Horse Championships 2008 VHO Trophy 2009 VHO Trophy

Florencio (1999 - 2016) was a horse that won the 2004 World Championships for Young Dressage Horses in the five-year-old division. He was the only horse to receive a mark of "10" in the 2004 competition, and he received the highest marks total ever given to a combination at the World Championship for Young Horses. He stood at 16.2 hh (1.68m) and was registered in the following stud books: Westfalen, Oldenburg, NRPS, Hannover, AES, Sweden.

As a foal, Florencio was bought from Frank Van Dijck of Belgium, by Eugene Reesink. Henk Nijhoff partnered in the young stallion, and Florencio was sent into training as a dressage horse with rider Simon Dropp. With Dropp, he was Reserve Champion of Germany in the prestigious 2003 "Bundeschampionaat" and was Overall Champion of the 4-year-olds in Westphalia.

Minderhoud took Florencio as a comunt in 2004. He also began his breeding career during this time. By 2004, he had covered more than 500 mares across Europe, mostly through artificial insemination provided by the Kathmann Stud in Vechta, Germany. That year, Florencio had a breeding accident and required several weeks of recovery.

In 2005, Florencio came back EVA (Equine viral arteritis) positive.

In 2008 and 2009, Florencio won the VHO Trophy at the KWPN Stallion Licensing in 's Hertogenbosch, The Netherlands. He attempted, but never successfully competed at Grand Prix.

In 2013, Florencio had surgery to repair a inguinal hernia.

On 5 May 2016, Florencio died suddenly from cardiac arrest.

== Testing Scores ==
=== Performance Test ===
Florencio's performance test was held in Zweibrücken, where he finished second:

- Character: 8.5
- Walk: 10
- Trot: 8.2
- Canter: 9.2
- "Rittigkeit" (Rideability): 9.5
- Jumping 7.8.

=== Scores for the 2004 World Championships for Young Dressage Horses ===
- First Round: 9.66
  - Walk: 9.5
  - Trot: 9.8
  - Canter: 9.8
- Finals:
  - Walk: 9.8
  - Trot: 9.7
  - Canter: 10*

Florencio's canter was especially notable, being extremely uphill and engaged. However, all three gaits were very impressive. The stallion was said to be very supple, elastic, and through during the Championship.

- Florencio is one of only two horses to have ever received a mark of "10" at the World Championships for Young Horses. The other was the stellar mare, Poetin, who received a 10 for her trot at the 2003 Championships, when she competed as a 6-year-old.

=== Scores for the 2005 World Championships for Young Dressage Horses ===
- Friday Qualifier Total: 9.38
  - Walk: 9.00
  - Trot: 9.60
  - Canter: 9.70
- Overall: 9.48
  - Trot: 9.8
  - Canter: 10

The stallion again had an impressive qualifier test at the 2005 World Championships, winning it yet again. The judges commented on his elasticity, suppleness, and engagement. His trot was bouncy, and his collected and extended walk work was considered excellent. The only negative comment was of the young horse's tendency to sometimes let a little of his tongue hang out.

His test at the final was also excellent, where he won the six-year-old division. The judges commented on his bouncy trot "like a rubber ball", his regular and even walk, and his excellent canter that again earned him a 10. However, the bay stallion lost points due to a medium trot that was not quite in rhythm, a too-large walk pirouette, and the flying changes that would cause the canter to become unbalanced after they were performed.
