= Edward Gal =

Dutch dressage rider (born 1970)

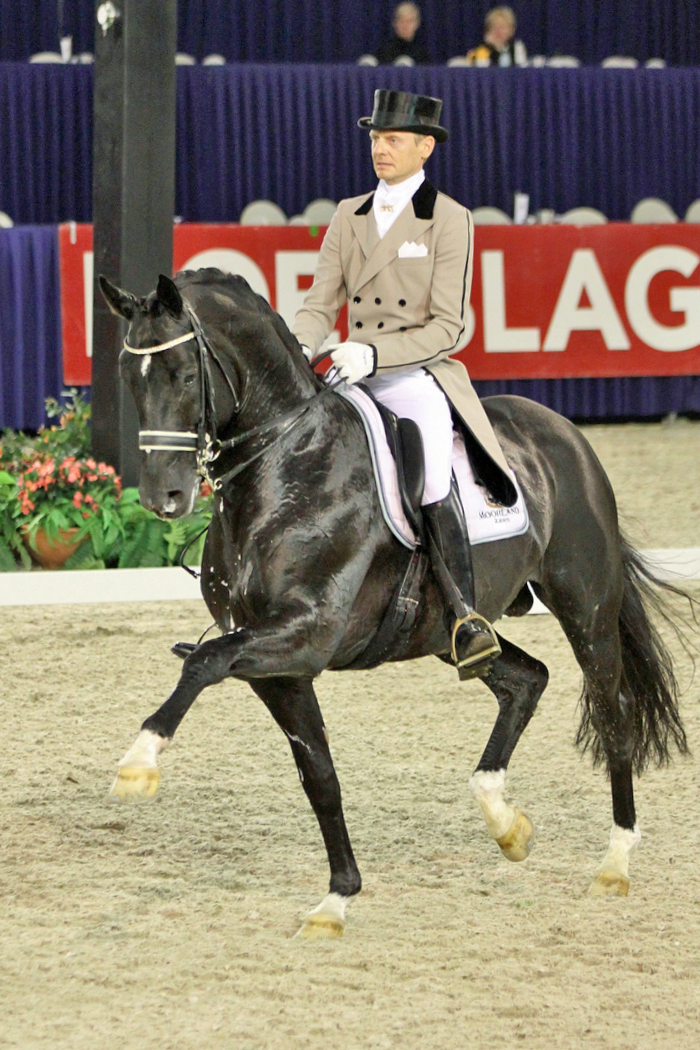
- Edward Gal with Totilas

Medal record

Representing the Netherlands

Equestrian

Olympic Games
Bronze medal – third place	2012 London	Team dressage

World Championships
Gold medal – first place	2010 Lexington	Team dressage
Gold medal – first place	2010 Lexington	Special dressage
Gold medal – first place	2010 Lexington	Freestyle dressage
Silver medal – second place	2006 Aachen	Team dressage
Bronze medal – third place	2014 Normandy	Team dressage

European Championships
Gold medal – first place	2009 Windsor	Team dressage
Gold medal – first place	2009 Windsor	Freestyle dressage
Gold medal – first place	2015 Aachen	Team dressage
Silver medal – second place	2005 Hagen	Team dressage
Silver medal – second place	2009 Windsor	Special dressage
Silver medal – second place	2013 Herning	Team dressage
Silver medal – second place	2019 Rotterdam	Team dressage
Bronze medal – third place	2011 Rotterdam	Team dressage

World Cup
Gold medal – first place	2010 Den Bosch	Individual dressage
Silver medal – second place	2004 Düsseldorf	Individual dressage
Silver medal – second place	2005 Las Vegas	Individual dressage
Silver medal – second place	2015 Las Vegas	Individual dressage
Bronze medal – third place	2014 Lyon	Individual dressage

Edward Gal (born 4 March 1970 in Rheden) is a Dutch dressage rider. He and the stallion Totilas (nicknamed "Toto"), were triple gold medalists at the 2010 FEI World Equestrian Games, becoming the first horse-rider partnership ever to sweep the three available dressage gold medals at a single FEI World Games. Going into the 2010 Games, they had amassed multiple world-record scores in international competition, leading one American journalist to call them "rock stars in the horse world". After the World Equestrian Games, Totilas was sold to German trainer Paul Schockemöhle. Gal continues to be successful, training and competing dressage horses at the international level. Despite the success, he has been criticised to be a harsh trainer who creates stressed and fearful horses.

== Career ==
Gal began his equestrian career as a jumper at age 14, beginning with ponies and graduating to larger horses at age 20. However, when he discovered his horse did not like jumping, he switched to dressage. While enjoying solid success in national and international competition, he did not become a truly dominant rider until he began competing with Totilas in 2008. Gal would later say that he and his team understood that Totilas was a special horse after their first Grand Prix competition.

At the time, Gal replaced his countrywoman Anky van Grunsven as the dominant rider on the world dressage circuit. In July 2009, Gal and Totilas broke van Grunsven's world record score in Grand Prix Freestyle with an 89.50% mark at Hickstead, England, and shortly thereafter followed it up with another record score of 90.75% in the same discipline at that year's European Championships. In December 2009, at the fourth leg of the 2009–10 FEI World Cup Dressage series at Olympia in London, they extended their record in GP Freestyle to 92.30%, more than 10 points above the second-place finisher. While not setting a world record, they easily won that season's FEI World Cup final in GP Freestyle at home in the Netherlands, winning by more than 7 points with a score better than their first world record. The pair also had a world-record score in the Grand Prix Special discipline to their credit, having recorded 86.460% at Aachen in July 2010.

Gal and Totilas were installed as the overwhelming favorites in the 2010 FEI World Games in Lexington, Kentucky, their first competition outside Europe. Klaus Röser, head of the German dressage team that has long dominated the discipline, said about Gal, "That we can beat Edward; I don't think so, I don't believe so. We have to be realistic." Röser's assessment proved correct, with Gal and Toto first leading the Dutch team to gold in the team competition, and then easily winning gold in Grand Prix Special and Grand Prix Freestyle.

In a piece in The Courier-Journal of Louisville, Kentucky that ran before the 2010 Games, dressage trainer Susan Posner pointed out that Totilas was only in his second year in grand prix dressage despite being 10 years old, and said that his success illustrated how capable Gal was as a rider.

He also competed at the 2015 European Dressage Championships in Aachen where he won a gold medal in team dressage. The Dutch national dressage coach Wim Ernes died on 1 November 2016 due to a brain tumor. Gal, together with the other gold medal winners Patrick van der Meer, Hans Peter Minderhoud and Diederik van Silfhout, carried his coffin during the funeral on 5 November 2016. He is known to use rollkur on his horses

== International Championship results ==
Results
Year	Event	Horse	Score	Placing	Notes
2003	European Championships	Lingh		29th	Individual
2004	World Cup Final	Lingh		2nd place, silver medalist(s)	
2005	World Cup Final	Lingh		2nd place, silver medalist(s)	
2005	European Championships	Lingh		2nd place, silver medalist(s)	Team
2005	European Championships	Lingh		4th	Individual
2006	World Cup Final	Lingh		4th	
2006	World Equestrian Games	Lingh		2nd place, silver medalist(s)	Team
2006	World Equestrian Games	Lingh		12th	Individual
2007	World Cup Final	Gribaldi	64.900%	11th	
2009	European Championships	Totilas	84.085%	1st place, gold medalist(s)	Team
2009	European Championships	Totilas	83.042%	2nd place, silver medalist(s)	Individual Special
2009	European Championships	Totilas	90.750%	1st place, gold medalist(s)	Individual Freestyle
2010	World Cup Final	Totilas	89.800%	1st place, gold medalist(s)	
2010	World Equestrian Games	Totilas	84.043%	1st place, gold medalist(s)	Team
2010	World Equestrian Games	Totilas	85.708%	1st place, gold medalist(s)	Individual Special
2010	World Equestrian Games	Totilas	91.800%	1st place, gold medalist(s)	Individual Freestyle
2011	World Cup Final	Sisther du Jeu	77.393%	4th	
2011	European Championships	Sisther du Jeu	70.517%	3rd place, bronze medalist(s)	Team
2011	European Championships	Sisther du Jeu	69.211%	18th	Individual Special
2012	Olympic Games	Glock's Undercover	75.395%	3rd place, bronze medalist(s)	Team
2012	Olympic Games	Glock's Undercover	80.267%	9th	Individual
2013	World Cup Final	Glock's Undercover	84.446%	3rd place, bronze medalist(s)	
2013	European Championships	Glock's Undercover	81.763%	2nd place, silver medalist(s)	Team
2013	European Championships	Glock's Undercover	79.479%	4th	Individual Special
2013	European Championships	Glock's Undercover	84.911%	4th	Individual Freestyle
2014	World Cup Final	Glock's Undercover	83.696%	3rd place, bronze medalist(s)	
2014	World Equestrian Games	Glock's Voice	72.414%	3rd place, bronze medalist(s)	Team
2014	World Equestrian Games	Glock's Voice	70.392%	25th	Individual Special
2015	World Cup Final	Glock's Undercover	84.696%	2nd place, silver medalist(s)	
2015	European Championships	Glock's Undercover	82.229%	1st place, gold medalist(s)	Team
2015	European Championships	Glock's Undercover	EL	29th	Individual Special
2016	Olympic Games	Glock's Voice	75.271%	4th	Team
2016	Olympic Games	Glock's Voice	73.655%	20th	Individual
2017	World Cup Final	Glock's Voice	78.921%	6th	
2017	European Championships	Glock's Voice	72.457%	5th	Team
2017	European Championships	Glock's Voice	69.468%	24th	Individual Special
2018	World Cup Final	Glock's Zonik	79.654%	8th	
2018	World Equestrian Games	Glock's Zonik	77.189%	5th	Team
2018	World Equestrian Games	Glock's Zonik	77.751%	7th	Individual Special
2019	European Championships	Glock's Zonik	78.758%	2nd place, silver medalist(s)	Team
2019	European Championships	Glock's Zonik	77.994%	8th	Individual Special
2019	European Championships	Glock's Zonik	84.271%	6th	Individual Freestyle

== Notable horses ==
- Lingh - 1993 Bay Dutch Warmblood Stallion (Flemmingh x Columbus)
  - 2003 European Championships - Individual 29th Place
  - 2004 FEI World Cup Final - Silver Medal
  - 2005 FEI World Cup Final - Silver Medal
  - 2005 European Championships - Team Silver Medal, Individual Fourth Place
  - 2006 FEI World Cup Final - Fourth Place
  - 2006 World Equestrian Games - Team Silver Medal, Individual 11th Place, Individual 12th Place Freestyle
- IPS Gribaldi - 1993 Black Trakehner Stallion (Kostolany x Ibikus)
  - 2007 FEI World Cup Final - 11th Place
- Totilas - 2000 Black Dutch Warmblood Stallion (Gribaldi x Glendale)
  - 2009 European Championships - Team Gold Medal, Individual Silver Medal, Individual Gold Medal Freestyle
  - 2010 FEI World Cup Final - Gold Medal
  - 2010 World Equestrian Games - Team Gold Medal, Individual Gold Medal, Individual Gold Medal Freestyle
- Sisther de Jeu - 1999 Bay Dutch Warmblood Mare (Gribaldi x Amor)
  - 2011 FEI World Cup Final - Fourth Place
  - 2011 European Championships - Team Bronze Medal, Individual 18th Place
- Glock's Undercover - 2001 Black Dutch Warmblood Gelding (Ferro x Donnerhall)
  - 2012 London Olympics - Team Bronze Medal, Individual Ninth Place
  - 2013 FEI World Cup Final - Bronze Medal
  - 2013 European Championships - Team Silver Medal, Individual Fourth Place, Individual Fourth Place Freestyle
  - 2014 FEI World Cup Final - Bronze Medal
  - 2015 FEI World Cup Final - Silver Medal
  - 2015 European Championships - Team Gold Medal, Individual 29th Place
- Glock's Voice - 2002 Black Dutch Warmblood Stallion (De Niro x Rhodiamant)
  - 2014 World Equestrian Games - Team Bronze Medal, Individual 25th Place
  - 2016 Rio Olympics - Team Fourth Place, Individual 20th Place
  - 2017 FEI World Cup Final - Sixth Place
- Glock's Zonik NOP - 2008 Dark Bay Danish Warmblood Stallion (Blue Hors Zack x Romanov)
  - 2018 FEI World Cup Final - Eighth Place

== Personal life ==
Gal is in a long-term relationship with teammate Hans Peter Minderhoud. Gal has been interviewed in several Dutch media outlets about his relationship with Minderhoud.
