= Kristina Bröring-Sprehe =

German dressage rider (born 1986)

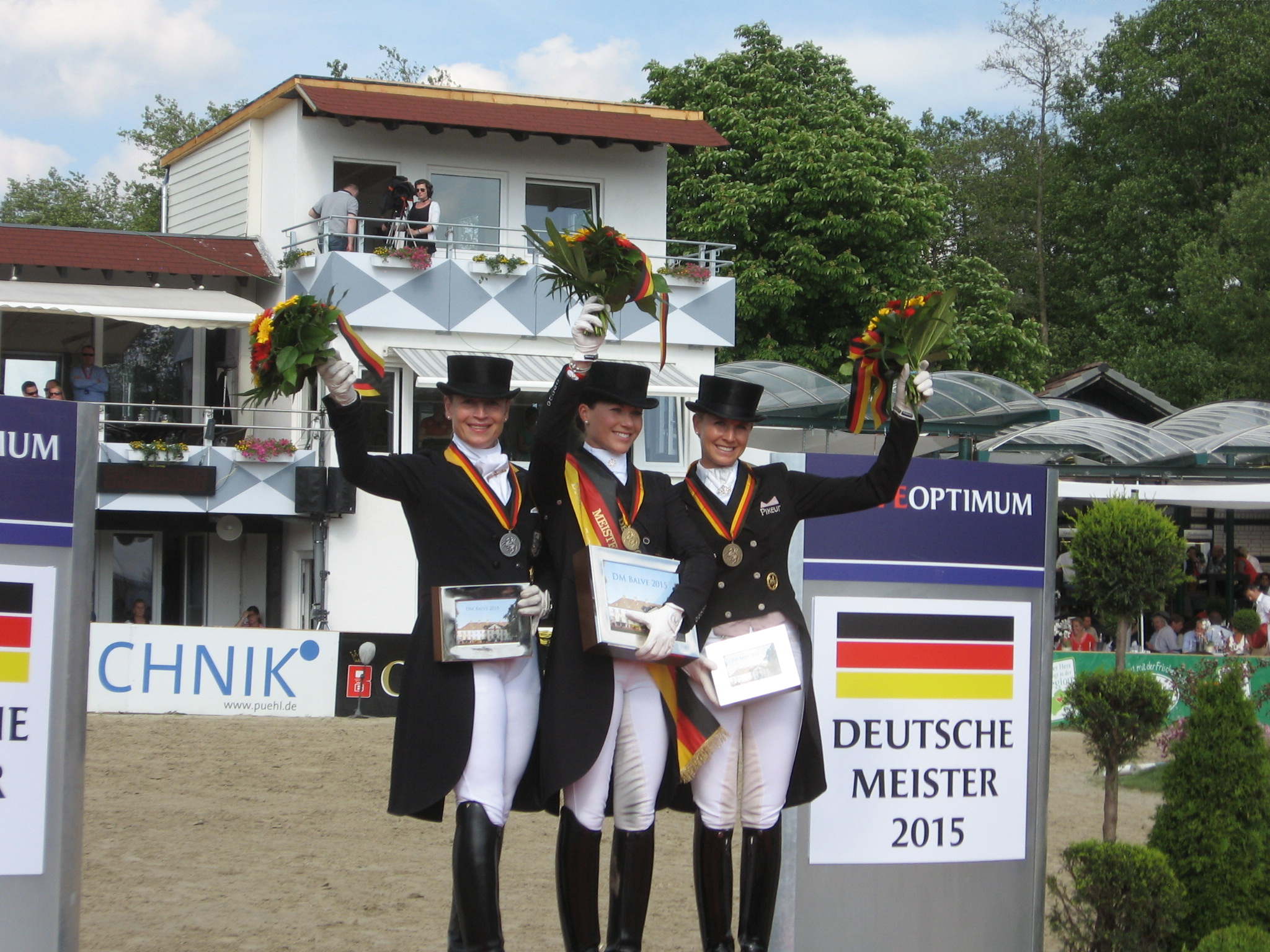
- Bröring-Sprehe (in the middle) at the 2015 German Championships

Personal information
- Nationality: German
- Born: 28 October 1986 (age 39) Lohne, West Germany
- Height: 168 cm (5 ft 6 in)
- Weight: 54 kg (119 lb)

Sport
- Country: Germany
- Sport: Equestrian
Medal record
Equestrian
Representing Germany
Olympic Games
Gold medal – first place	2016 Rio de Janeiro	Team dressage
Silver medal – second place	2012 London	Team dressage
Bronze medal – third place	2016 Rio de Janeiro	Individual dressage
World Championships
Gold medal – first place	2014 Normandy	Team dressage
Bronze medal – third place	2014 Normandy	Spécial dressage
European Championships
Gold medal – first place	2013 Herning	Team dressage
Silver medal – second place	2015 Aachen	Spécial dressage
Silver medal – second place	2015 Aachen	Freestyle dressage
Bronze medal – third place	2015 Aachen	Team dressage

Kristina Bröring-Sprehe (born 28 October 1986 in Lohne, West Germany) is a German dressage rider competing at Olympic level.

== Career ==
On 7 August 2012 Sprehe was a member of the team which won the silver medal in the team dressage event.

She was a member of the German team that won the team Gold at the 2013 European Dressage Championship in Herning. At the 2014 World Equestrian Games in Normandy Kristina won another team Gold and individual Bronze in the Grand Prix Special, her first individual championship medal at the senior level. At the 2015 European Dressage Championships in Aachen, Kristina and her top horse of the past four years, Desperados, won team Bronze and two individual silver medals. She also won bronze in the individual dressage at the 2016 Summer Olympics.
