= 2013 European Dressage Championships =

2013 European Dressage Championship
- Host city: Herning, Denmark
- Date(s): 21–25 August
- Level: Senior, Under 25
- Events: 3 Team, GP Special, GP Freestyle
- Records set: 1

The 2013 European Dressage Championship, known for sponsorship reasons as the Blue Hors European Dressage Championship was held between August 21 and August 25, 2013 in Herning, Denmark. It formed part of the 2013 FEI ECCO European Championships; other disciplines included were Showjumping and Para-Dressage.

Germany, the historically dominant nation in European and World dressage, regained its European team title, which it had lost to Great Britain in 2011. The Netherlands edged out the British team, for whom Olympic team champion Laura Tomlinson was a late withdrawal, for the silver team medal.

The individual competitions were dominated by the British double Olympic champion Charlotte Dujardin, riding Valegro, winning her first European titles and edging out 2011 double individual champion Adelinde Cornelissen. Dujardin set a new Championship record in the Individual Freestyle or Kr with the second highest score ever recorded in the discipline.

The 2013 event was the 26th edition of the European Dressage Championships. Parallel to the senior European Championships, a Youth Horse Show for riders up to 25 years of age was also held.

== Medal summary ==
Event	Gold		Silver		Bronze	
Team Dressage	Germany; Fabienne Lütkemeier riding D´Agostino 5 Isabell Werth riding Don Johnson FRH; Kristina Sprehe riding Desperados FRH; Helen Langehanenberg riding Damon Hill NRW	234.651	Netherlands; Danielle Heijkoop riding Kingsley Siro; Hans Peter Minderhoud riding Glock´s Romanov; Edward Gal riding Glock´s Undercover; Adelinde Cornelissen riding Parzival	233.967	Great Britain; Charlotte Dujardin riding Valegro; Carl Hester riding Uthopia; Gareth Hughes riding Dv Stenkjers Nadonna; Michael Eilberg riding Half Moon Delphi	233.540
Individual GP Special Details	Charlotte Dujardin (United Kingdom) riding Valegro	85.699	Helen Langehanenberg (Germany) riding Damon Hill	84.330	Adelinde Cornelissen (Netherlands) riding Parzival	81.548
Individual GP Freestyle (Kúr) Details	Charlotte Dujardin (United Kingdom) riding Valegro	91.250 CR	Helen Langehanenberg (Germany) riding Damon Hill	87.286	Adelinde Cornelissen (Netherlands) riding Parzival	86.393

- CR - Championship Record

=== Medal table ===
Place	Nation	1st place, gold medalist(s)	2nd place, silver medalist(s)	3rd place, bronze medalist(s)	Total
1	Great Britain	2	0	1	3
2	Germany	1	2	0	3
3	Netherlands	0	1	2	3
Total		3	3	3	9

=== Minor Competitions ===
As part of the event, two individual under 25 'junior' competitions were also held. They were both won by Nanna Skodborg Merrald, as hosts Denmark dominated the medals in both disciplines.

Event	Gold		Silver		Bronze	
Under 25
Intermediere II	Nanna Skodborg Merrald (Denmark) riding Millibar	74.605	Daniel Bachmann Andersen (Denmark) riding Donna Silver	71.184	Nadine Husenbeth (Germany) riding Florida 94	70.877
Grand Prix	Nanna Skodborg Merrald (Denmark) riding Millibar	73.411	Daniel Bachmann Andersen (Denmark) riding Donna Silver	71.628	Nadine Husenbeth (Germany) riding Florida 94	69.767

== Competitions ==
=== General ===
Competition was held in the MCH Arena of Herning, in three events; the team event involved three or four horses per nation (the three best scores are counted), while individuals competed in two individual competitions, Individual Grand Prix Spécial and two days later in the individual Grand Prix Freestyle or Kúr. Unlike in the Olympic Games, scores in the two individual disciplines were not combined, and medals were awarded in each discipline separately.

At this European Championship a record number of participants started the Championship competitions. In the Team Grand Prix de Dressage 64 riders and 16 teams start. Each nation can start with a team of three or four riders, each rider with one horse.
