= Hans Peter Minderhoud =

Dutch equestrian

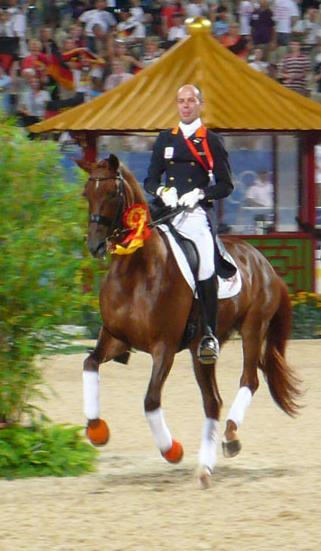
- Minderhoud with Nadine at the 2008 Summer Olympics

Personal information
- Full name: Hans Peter Francois Minderhoud
- Discipline: Dressage
- Born: 7 October 1973 (age 52); Westkapelle, Zeeland
- Height: 190 cm (6 ft 3 in)
Medal record
Equestrian
Representing Netherlands
Olympic Games
Silver medal – second place	2008 Beijing	Team dressage
World Championships
Gold medal – first place	2010 Kentucky	Team dressage
Bronze medal – third place	2014 Normandy	Team dressage
European Championshipsv
Gold medal – first place	2007 La Mandria	Team dressage
Gold medal – first place	2015 Aachen	Team dressage
Silver medal – second place	2013 Herning	Team dressage
Silver medal – second place	2019 Rotterdam	Team dressage
Bronze medal – third place	2011 Rotterdam	Team dressage
Bronze medal – third place	2015 Aachen	Spécial dressage
World Cup
Gold medal – first place	2016 Göteborg	Individual dressage

Hans Peter Francois Minderhoud (born 7 October 1973 in Westkapelle, Zeeland) is a Dutch dressage rider.

Minderhoud won the VSN Cup in 2004 with his horse Gameboy and also succeeded in the Pavo Cup with Sandreo and Florencio. At the 2004 World Championships for 5-year-old horses, he won the World title in Verden with Florencio. In the 2004/05 Stallion Competition, he won the L-Class with Sandreo and the Z-Class with Rhodium. He won his second World title at the 2005 World Championships for 6-year-old horses with Florencio. Later that year, he and Uptown won the Pavo Cup as well.

In the 2005/06 Stallion Competition, he retained his titles in the L and Z-Class, and also added the M-Class to his list. With Rubels he won the 2006 VHO Trophy. Besides that, he succeeded in the Future Stallion Tournament with Florencio and the Pavo Cup with Ucelli T. In the 2007 Future Stallion Tournament he retained his title with Ucelli T, but also won the silver medal with EXQUIS Rubiloh in the same event. He succeeded again at the Pavo Cup, this time with Vivaldi. At the 2007 European Championships in Turin, he and his teammates became European Champion in the team competition.

With Johnson, he won the KWPN Stallion Championship 2007/08 and he also qualified for the 2008 Summer Olympics in Beijing. He qualified for the individual competition as well as the team event with his teammates Anky van Grunsven and Imke Bartels. In personal life, Minderhoud has a relationship with teammate Edward Gal.

He also competed at the 2015 European Dressage Championships in Aachen where he won a gold medal in team dressage. The Dutch national dressage coach Wim Ernes died on 1 November 2016 due to a brain tumor. Minderhoud, together with the other gold medal winners Patrick van der Meer, Edward Gal, and Diederik van Silfhout, carried his coffin during the funeral on 5 November 2016.

== Notable horses ==
- Exquis Nadine - 1995 Chestnut Dutch Warmblood Mare (TCN Partout x Roemer)
  - 2007 European Championships - Team Gold Medal, Individual 14th Place
  - 2008 Beijing Olympics - Team Silver Medal, Individual Fifth Place
  - 2009 FEI World Cup Final - Fourth Place
  - 2010 World Equestrian Games - Team Gold Medal, Individual 22nd Place
  - 2011 FEI World Cup Final - Eighth Place
  - 2011 European Championships - Team Bronze Medal, Individual 14th Place, Individual 11th Place Freestyle
- Glock's Tango - 2000 Chestnut Dutch Warmblood Stallion (Jazz x Contango)
  - 2012 FEI World Cup Final - Sixth Place
- Glock's Romanov - 2000 Bay Oldenburg Stallion (Rohdiamant x Grundstein II)
  - 2013 European Championships - Team Silver Medal, Individual 13th Place
- Glock's Johnson TN - 2002 Bay Dutch Warmblood Stallion (Jazz x Flemmingh)
  - 2014 FEI World Cup Final - Eighth Place
  - 2014 World Equestrian Games - Team Bronze Medal, Individual 11th Place, Individual 14th Place Freestyle
  - 2015 European Championships - Team Gold Medal, Individual Bronze Medal, Individual Fifth Place Freestyle
  - 2016 Rio Olympics - Team Fourth Place, Individual Ninth Place
- Glock's Flirt - 2001 Chestnut Swiss Warmblood Stallion (Florestan I x Gauguin de Lully)
  - 2015 FEI World Cup Final - Fifth Place
  - 2016 FEI World Cup Final - Gold Medal
- Glock's Dream Boy - 2008 Black Dutch Warmblood Stallion (Vivaldi x Olympic Ferro)
  - 2018 World Equestrian Games - Team Fourth lace, Individual 20th Place
  - 2019 FEI World Cup Final - Tenth Place
  - 2019 European Championships - Team Silver Medal, Individual Thirteenth Place, Individual Ninth Place Freestyle
  - 2021 Tokyo Olympics - Team Fifth Place, Individual Twelfth Place
  - 2021 European Championships - Team Fifth Place, Individual Sixteenth Place
