= 2015 FEI World Cup Finals (show jumping and dressage) =

Dressage and show jumping

The 2015 FEI World Cup Finals in Las Vegas was held between April 15 to April 19, 2015. It was to be the final of the Show jumping and Dressage World Cup series. The finals were held at the Thomas & Mack Center. For the first time since 2009 Show Jumping and Dressage World Cup Finals were held in the United States.

== Dressage results ==
Grand Prix

1. Charlotte DUJARDIN (GBR)
2. Edward GAL (NED)
3. Steffen PETERS (USA)

Grand Prix Freestyle to Music

1. Charlotte DUJARDIN (GBR)
2. Edward GAL (NED)
3. Jessica VON BREDOW-WERNDL (GER)

== Show jumping results ==
Final Individual Classification

1. GUERDAT, Steve (SUI)
2. LEPREVOST, Penelope (FRA)
3. ALLEN, Bertram (IRL)
