= 2015 European Dressage Championships =

2015 European Dressage Championship
- Host city: Aachen, Germany
- Date(s): 12–16 August 2015
- Level: Senior
- Events: 3 Team, GP Special, GP Freestyle

The 2015 European Dressage Championships was held between August 12 and August 16, 2015 in Aachen, Germany. It formed part of the 2015 FEI European Championships; other disciplines included were jumping, reining and vaulting. It also served as a 2016 Olympics qualifier with team quotas in dressage awarded to the best three teams not already qualified nations.

The 2015 event was the 27th edition of the European Dressage Championships. This was the first European Dressage Championships held in Germany since 2005 and the first held in Aachen since 1983.

18 nations were scheduled to compete.

== Summary ==
The host country was Germany. The Netherlands and Great Britain maintained their domination of the sport. As all three nations had already qualified for the 2016 Games, the quota places went to Spain, Sweden and France. Spain won its first medal since 2005.

== Medal summary ==
Event	Gold	Silver	Bronze
Individual special dressage	(United Kingdom) Charlotte Dujardin on Valegro	(Germany) Kristina Bröring-Sprehe on Desperados	(Netherlands) Hans Peter Minderhoud on Johnson
Individual freestyle dressage	(United Kingdom) Charlotte Dujardin on Valegro	(Germany) Kristina Bröring-Sprehe on Desperados	(Spain) Beatriz Ferrer-Salat on Delgado
Team dressage	Netherlands; Patrick van der Meer on Uzzo; Diederik van Silfhout on Arlando; Hans Peter Minderhoud on Johnson; Edward Gal on Undercover	Great Britain; Michael Eilberg on Marakov; Fiona Bigwood on Orthilia; Carl Hester on Nip Tuck; Charlotte Dujardin on Valegro	Germany; Jessica von Bredow-Werndl on Unee; Isabell Werth on Don Johnson; Matthias Alexander Rath on Totilas; Kristina Bröring-Sprehe on Desperados

=== Medal table ===
Medal Event
Rank	Nation	Gold	Silver	Bronze	Total
1	Great Britain (GBR)	2	1	0	3
2	Netherlands (NED)	1	0	1	2
3	Germany (GER)*	0	2	1	3
4	Spain (ESP)	0	0	1	1
Totals (4 entries)		3	3	3	9

== Aftermath ==
The Dutch coach of the dressage team Wim Ernes died on 1 November 2016. The gold medal winning dressage team at these championships Edward Gal, Hans Peter Minderhoud, Diederik van Silfhout and Patrick van der Meer carried his coffin during his funeral on 5 November 2016.
