= 2003 European Dressage Championships =

23rd edition of European Dressage Championship

2003 Open European Dressage Championships
- Host city: Hickstead, Great Britain (United Kingdom)
- Date(s): 13–17 August 2003
- Level: Senior
- Events: 3 Team, GP Special, GP Freestyle
- Records set: 0

The 2003 FEI Open European Dressage Championships, was the 23rd edition of the European Dressage Championship. It was held at The All England Jumping Course in Hickstead, Great Britain, from 13 August to 17 August 2003. The 2003 European Dressage Championships was the first open European Championship, including riders from the US, Australia, Canada and Japan. Germany won the golden team medal, as well as the individual gold medal won by Ulla Salzgeber. Great Britain won a team medal for the second time in history during the European Dressage Championships, the first medal was won in 1993.

== Medal summary ==
=== Medal table ===
Rank	Nation	Gold	Silver	Bronze	Total
1	Germany (GER)	2	0	0	2
2	Spain (ESP)	0	1	1	2
3	Sweden (SWE)	0	1	0	1
4	Great Britain (GBR)	0	0	1	1
Totals (4 entries)		2	2	2	6

=== Medalists ===
Event	Gold	Silver	Bronze
Individual dressage	(Germany) Ulla Salzgeber on Rusty	(Sweden) Jan Brink on Björsells Briar 899	(Spain) Beatriz Ferrer-Salat on Beauvalais
Team dressage	Germany; Ulla Salzgeber on Rusty; Klaus Husenbeth on Piccolo; Heike Kemmer on Bonaparte; Isabell Werth on Satchmo	Spain; Beatriz Ferrer-Salat on Beauvalais; Rafael Soto on Invasor; Ignacio Rambla on Distinguido; Juan Antonio Jimenez on Guizo	Great Britain; Emma Hindle on Wie Weltmeyer; Nicola McGivern on Active Walters; Richard Davison on Ballaseyr Royale; Emile Faurie on Rascher Hopes
