= European Dressage Championships =

Equestrian competition

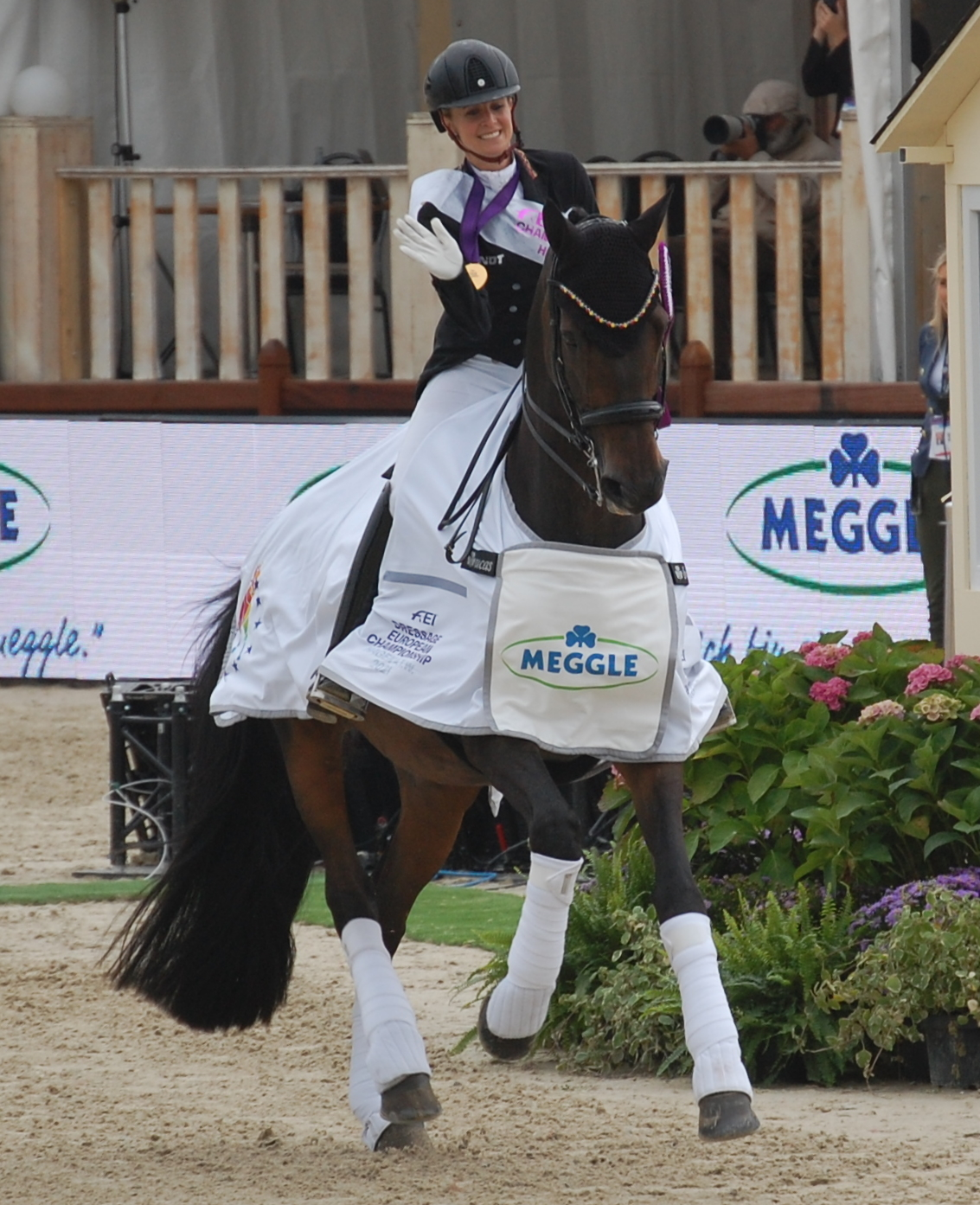
- 2021 European dressage championship Jessica von Bredow-Werndl
- Status: Active
- Genre: Sports event
- Frequency: Biannually
- Location: Various
- Inaugurated: 1963
- Most recent: 2023, Riesenbeck
- Next event: 2025, Crozet
- Organiser: FEI

The European Dressage Championships are the European championships for the equestrian discipline of dressage. They are held every two years in odd-numbered years. Gold, silver, and bronze medals are awarded in both individual and team competitions. There are also championships held for juniors, young riders, and ponies. Since 2015, the competition has shared a site and branding with vaulting, reining, jumping, and driving events. For sponsorship reasons, eventing is not included, as it is part of the FEI European Championships, echoing the combined World Equestrian Games concept. The first official combined event took place in Aachen in 2015.

== History ==
The official European Dressage Championship was first held in 1963. Before then, beginning in the 1950s, the FEI has held the FEI Grand Prix annually. The winners of these events were referred to as European champions.

At the official first European Dressage Championship in 1963 it was possible to start with more than one horse, so each rider could win more than one individual medal. Today, each rider can start with only one horse.

The history of team medals starts at the European Dressage Championships in 1965. Two years before, only Great Britain and Romania had three riders at the European Championships (three riders are necessary for a team). However, the rules state that a minimum number of three teams must compete in the team competition, so no team medals were awarded in 1963. From 1963 to 2005, each European Dressage Championship team competition was won by the Federal Republic of Germany, which became Germany in 1990. In 2007, the Dutch team won the competition.

Up to 1991, only one individual prize giving was held. In 1993 and 1995 two individual competitions were held—the Grand Prix Spécial and the Grand Prix Freestyle (also called Grand Prix Kür). The riders had to choose which of the two individual competitions they wanted to start in.

In 1997, the rules were changed again. The riders had to start in the Grand Prix de Dressage (the team competition), the Grand Prix Spécial, and the Grand Prix Freestyle. At the end of these competitions, only one individual prize giving was held. Since 2005, the riders can win an individual competition in both the Grand Prix Spécial and the Grand Prix Freestyle. A rider who wants to start in the Grand Prix Freestyle must start also in the Grand Prix Spécial.

In 2003 the European Dressage Championship was held as the Open European Dressage Championship, but a closed European Championship was calculated based on the result.

== Individual results ==
Individual medalists
Year	Location	Event	Gold	Silver	Bronze
1963	(Denmark) Copenhagen	Individual	(Switzerland) Henri Chammartin on Wolfdietrich	(West Germany) Harry Boldt on Remus	(Switzerland) Henri Chammartin on Woerman
1965	(Denmark) Copenhagen	Individual	(Switzerland) Henri Chammartin on Wolfdietrich	(West Germany) Harry Boldt on Remus	(West Germany) Reiner Klimke on Arcadius
1967	(West Germany) Aachen	Individual	(West Germany) Reiner Klimke on Dux	(Soviet Union) Ivan Kizimov on Ichor	(West Germany) Harry Boldt on Remus
1969	(West Germany) Wolfsburg	Individual	(West Germany) Liselott Linsenhoff on Piaff	(Soviet Union) Ivan Kizimov on Ichor	(West Germany) Josef Neckermann on Mariano
1971	(West Germany) Wolfsburg	Individual	(West Germany) Liselott Linsenhoff on Piaff	(West Germany) Josef Neckermann on Van Eick	(Soviet Union) Ivan Kizimov on Ichor
1973	(West Germany) Aachen	Individual	(West Germany) Reiner Klimke on Mehmed	(Soviet Union) Elena Petushkova on Pepel	(Soviet Union) Ivan Kalita on Tarif
1975	(Soviet Union) Kyiv	Individual	(Switzerland) Christine Stückelberger on Granat	(West Germany) Harry Boldt on Woyceck	(West Germany) Karin Schlüter on Liostro
1977	(Switzerland) St. Gallen	Individual	(Switzerland) Christine Stückelberger on Granat	(West Germany) Harry Boldt on Woyceck	(West Germany) Uwe Schulten-Baumer on Silbowitz
1979	(Denmark) Aarhus	Individual	(Austria) Elisabeth Theurer on Mon Chéri	(Switzerland) Christine Stückelberger on Granat	(West Germany) Harry Boldt on Woyceck
1981	(Austria) Laxenburg	Individual	(West Germany) Uwe Schulten-Baumer on Madras	(Switzerland) Christine Stückelberger on Granat	(West Germany) Gabriela Grillo on Galapagos
1983	(West Germany) Aachen	Individual	(Denmark) Anne Grethe Jensen on Marzog	(West Germany) Reiner Klimke on Ahlerich	(West Germany) Uwe Sauer on Montevideo
1985	(Denmark) Copenhagen	Individual	(West Germany) Reiner Klimke on Ahlerich	(Switzerland) Otto Hofer on Limandus	(Denmark) Anne Grethe Jensen on Marzog
1987	(United Kingdom) Goodwood	Individual	(France) Margit Otto-Crépin on Corlandus	(West Germany) Ann-Kathrin Linsenhoff on Courage	(West Germany) Johann Hinnemann on Ideaal
1989	(Luxembourg) Mondorf	Individual	(West Germany) Nicole Uphoff on Rembrandt	(France) Margit Otto-Crépin on Corlandus	(West Germany) Ann-Kathrin Linsenhoff on Courage
1991	(Germany) Donaueschingen	Spécial	(Germany) Isabell Werth on Gigolo	(Germany) Nicole Uphoff on Rembrandt	(France) Margit Otto-Crépin on Corlandus
1991	(Germany) Donaueschingen	Freestyle	(Germany) Sven Rothenberger on Andiamo	(Germany) Klaus Balkenhol on Goldstern	(Soviet Union) Nina Menkova on Dixon
1993	(Slovenia) Lipica	Spécial	(Germany) Isabell Werth on Gigolo	(Germany) Monica Theodorescu on Grunox	(United Kingdom) Emile Faurie on Virtu
1993	(Slovenia) Lipica	Freestyle	(Germany) Nicole Uphoff on Rembrandt	(Germany) Sven Rothenberger on Andiamo	(Hungary) Gyula Dallos on Aktion
1995	(Luxembourg) Mondorf	Individual	(Germany) Isabell Werth on Gigolo	(Netherlands) Anky van Grunsven on Bonfire	(Netherlands) Sven Rothenberger on Bo
1997	(Germany) Verden	Individual	(Germany) Isabell Werth on Gigolo	(Netherlands) Anky van Grunsven on Bonfire	(Germany) Karin Rehbein on Donnerhall
1999	(Netherlands) Arnhem	Individual	(Netherlands) Anky van Grunsven on Bonfire	(Germany) Ulla Salzgeber on Rusty	(Netherlands) Arjen Teeuwissen on Goliath
2001	(Germany) Verden	Individual	(Germany) Ulla Salzgeber on Rusty	(Netherlands) Arjen Teeuwissen on Goliath	(Germany) Nadine Capellmann on Farbenfroh
2003	(United Kingdom) Hickstead	Individual	(Germany) Ulla Salzgeber on Rusty	(Sweden) Jan Brink on Briar	(Spain) Beatriz Ferrer-Salat on Beauvalais
2005	(Germany) Hagen	Individual	(Netherlands) Anky van Grunsven on Salinero	(Germany) Hubertus Schmidt on Wansuela Suerte	(Sweden) Jan Brink on Briar
2007	(Italy) La Mandria	Spécial	(Netherlands) Anky van Grunsven on Salinero	(Germany) Isabell Werth on Satchmo	(Netherlands) Imke Schellekens-Bartels on Sunrise
2007	(Italy) La Mandria	Freestyle	(Germany) Isabell Werth on Satchmo	(Netherlands) Anky van Grunsven on Salinero	(Netherlands) Imke Schellekens-Bartels on Sunrise
2009	(United Kingdom) Windsor	Spécial	(Netherlands) Adelinde Cornelissen on Parzival	(Netherlands) Edward Gal on Totilas	(United Kingdom) Laura Bechtolsheimer on Mistral Hojris
2009	(United Kingdom) Windsor	Freestyle	(Netherlands) Edward Gal on Totilas	(Netherlands) Adelinde Cornelissen on Parzival	(Netherlands) Anky van Grunsven on Salinero
2011	(Netherlands) Rotterdam	Spécial	(Netherlands) Adelinde Cornelissen on Parzival	(United Kingdom) Carl Hester on Uthopia	(United Kingdom) Laura Bechtolsheimer on Mistral Hojris
2011	(Netherlands) Rotterdam	Freestyle	(Netherlands) Adelinde Cornelissen on Parzival	(United Kingdom) Carl Hester on Uthopia	(Sweden) Patrik Kittel on Scandic
2013	(Denmark) Herning	Spécial	(United Kingdom) Charlotte Dujardin on Valegro	(Germany) Helen Langehanenberg on Damon Hill	(Netherlands) Adelinde Cornelissen on Parzival
2013	(Denmark) Herning	Freestyle	(United Kingdom) Charlotte Dujardin on Valegro	(Germany) Helen Langehanenberg on Damon Hill	(Netherlands) Adelinde Cornelissen on Parzival
2015	(Germany) Aachen	Spécial	(United Kingdom) Charlotte Dujardin on Valegro	(Germany) Kristina Bröring-Sprehe on Desperados	(Netherlands) Hans Peter Minderhoud on Johnson
2015	(Germany) Aachen	Freestyle	(United Kingdom) Charlotte Dujardin on Valegro	(Germany) Kristina Bröring-Sprehe on Desperados	(Spain) Beatriz Ferrer-Salat on Delgado
2017	(Sweden) Gothenburg	Spécial	(Germany) Isabell Werth on Weihegold	(Germany) Sönke Rothenberger on Cosmo	(Denmark) Cathrine Dufour on Atterupgaards Cassidy
2017	(Sweden) Gothenburg	Freestyle	(Germany) Isabell Werth on Weihegold	(Germany) Sönke Rothenberger on Cosmo	(Denmark) Cathrine Dufour on Atterupgaards Cassidy
2019	(Netherlands) Rotterdam	Spécial	(Germany) Isabell Werth on Bella Rose	(Germany) Dorothee Schneider on Showtime	(Denmark) Cathrine Dufour on Atterupgaards Cassidy
2019	(Netherlands) Rotterdam	Freestyle	(Germany) Isabell Werth on Bella Rose	(Germany) Dorothee Schneider on Showtime	(Germany) Jessica von Bredow-Werndl on Dalera
2021	(Germany) Hagen	Spécial	(Germany) Jessica von Bredow-Werndl on Dalera	(Germany) Isabell Werth on Weihegold OLD	(Denmark) Cathrine Dufour on Bohemian
2021	(Germany) Hagen	Freestyle	(Germany) Jessica von Bredow-Werndl on Dalera	(Denmark) Cathrine Dufour on Bohemian	(United Kingdom) Charlotte Dujardin on Gio
2023	(Germany) Riesenbeck	Spécial	(Germany) Jessica von Bredow-Werndl on Dalera	(Denmark) Nanna Skodborg Merrald on Zepter	(United Kingdom) Charlotte Dujardin on Imhotep
2023	(Germany) Riesenbeck	Freestyle	(Germany) Jessica von Bredow-Werndl on Dalera	(United Kingdom) Charlotte Fry on Glamourdale	(United Kingdom) Charlotte Dujardin on Imhotep
2025	(France) Crozet	Spécial	(Belgium) Justin Verboomen on Zonik Plus	(Denmark) Cathrine Dufour on Freestyle	(Germany) Isabell Werth on Wendy de Fontaine
2025	(France) Crozet	Freestyle	(Belgium) Justin Verboomen on Zonik Plus	(Denmark) Cathrine Dufour on Freestyle	(Germany) Isabell Werth on Wendy de Fontaine

== Team results ==
Team medalists
Year	Location	Gold	Silver	Bronze
1965	(Denmark) Copenhagen	West Germany; Reiner Klimke on Arcadius; Harry Boldt on Remus; Josef Neckermann on Antoinette	Switzerland; Henri Chammartin on Wolfdietrich; Gustav Fischer on Wald; Marianne Gossweiler on Stephan	Soviet Union; Ivan Kalita on Moar; Ivan Kizimov on Ichor; Elena Petushkova on Pepel
1967	(West Germany) Aachen	West Germany; Reiner Klimke on Dux; Harry Boldt on Remus; Josef Neckermann on Mariano	Soviet Union; Mikhael Kopeykin on Korbej; Ivan Kizimov on Ichor; Elena Petushkova on Pepel	Switzerland; Henri Chammartin on Wolfdietrich; Marianne Gossweiler on Stephan; Hansrüdi Thomi on Mekka
1969	(West Germany) Wolfsburg	West Germany; Liselott Linsenhoff on Piaff; Reiner Klimke on Dux; Josef Neckermann on Mariano	East Germany; Horst Köhler on Neuschnee; Wolfgang Müller on Marios; Gerhard Brockmüller on Tristan	Soviet Union; Ivan Kalita on Tarif; Ivan Kizimov on Ichor; Elena Petushkova on Pepel
1971	(West Germany) Wolfsburg	West Germany; Liselott Linsenhoff on Piaff; Reiner Klimke on Dux; Josef Neckermann on Von Eick	Soviet Union; Ivan Kalita on Tarif; Ivan Kizimov on Ichor; Elena Petushkova on Pepel	Sweden; Maud von Rosen on Lucky Boy; Ulla Håkansson on Ajax; Anders Lindgren
1973	(West Germany) Aachen	West Germany; Reiner Klimke on Mehmed; Karin Schlüter on Liostro; Liselott Linsenhoff on Piaff	Soviet Union; Ivan Kalita on Tarif; Ivan Kizimov on Ichor; Elena Petushkova on Pepel	Switzerland; Christine Stückelberger on Merry Boy II; Marita Aeschbacher on Charlamp; Hermann Dür on Sod
1975	(Soviet Union) Kyiv	West Germany; Harry Boldt on Wojceck; Karin Schlüter on Liostro; Ilsebill Becher on Mitsouko	Soviet Union; Ivan Kalita on Tarif; Mikhail Kopeykin; Elena Petushkova on Pepel	Switzerland; Christine Stückelberger on Granat; Ulrich Lehmann on Widin; Doris Ramseier on Roch
1977	(Switzerland) St. Gallen	West Germany; Harry Boldt on Wojceck; Gabriela Grillo on Ultimo; Uwe Schulten-Baumer on Silbowitz	Switzerland; Christine Stückelberger on Granat; Ulrich Lehmann on Widin; Claire Koch on Scorpio	Soviet Union; Irina Karacheva on Said; Mikhail Kopeykin on Igrok; Vera Misevich on Plot
1979	(Denmark) Aarhus	West Germany; Gabriela Grillo on Ultimo; Harry Boldt on Wojceck; Uwe Schulten-Baumer on Silbowitz	Soviet Union; Viktor Ugryumov on Shkval; Irina Karacheva on Said; Elena Petushkova on Abakan	Switzerland; Christine Stückelberger on Granat; Amy-Catherine de Bary on Aintree; Ulrich Lehmann on Widin
1981	(Austria) Laxenburg	West Germany; Uwe Schulten-Baumer on Madras; Gabriela Grillo on Galapagos; Reiner Klimke on Ahlerich	Switzerland; Christine Stückelberger on Granat; Amy-Catherine de Bary on Aintree; Ulrich Lehmann on Widin	Soviet Union; Yuriy Kovshov on Igrok; Vera Misevich on Plot; Tatiana Nenachova on Garun
1983	(West Germany) Aachen	West Germany; Uwe Schulten-Baumer on Madras; Uwe Sauer on Montevideo; Herbert Krug on Muscadeur; Reiner Klimke on Ahlerich	Denmark; Anne Grethe Jensen on Marzog; Finn Saksø-Larsen on Coq d'Or; Torben Ulsø Olsen on Patricia; Renee Igelski on Baloo	Switzerland; Otto Hofer on Limandus; Claire Koch on Beau Geste II; Christine Stückelberger on Achat; Amy-Catherine de Bary on Aintree
1985	(Denmark) Copenhagen	West Germany; Reiner Klimke on Ahlerich; Tilmann Meyer zu Erpen on Tristan; Uwe Sauer on Montevideo; Uwe Schulten-Baumer on Madras	Denmark; Anne Grethe Jensen on Marzog; Ernst Jessen on Why Not; Torben Ulsø Olsen on Patricia; Jesper Frismann on Clermont	Soviet Union; Olga Klimko on Rukh; Elena Petushkova on Hevsur; Yuriy Kovshov on Buket; Vladimir Lanyugin on Kuznets
1987	(United Kingdom) Goodwood	West Germany; Ann-Kathrin Linsenhoff on Courage; Johann Hinnemann on Ideaal; Herbert Krug on Floriano; Gina Capellmann on Ampere	Switzerland; Daniel Ramseier on Orlando; Otto Hofer on Limandus; Ulrich Lehmann on Xanthos; Christine Stückelberger on Gauguin de Lully	Netherlands; Annemarie Sanders-Keijzer on Amon; Hélène Aubert on Mr. X Tineke Bartels on Duco; Bert Rutten on Robby
1989	(Luxembourg) Mondorf	West Germany; Nicole Uphoff on Rembrandt; Ann-Kathrin Linsenhoff on Courage; Isabell Werth on Weingart; Monica Theodorescu on Ganimedes	Soviet Union; Nina Menkova on Dikson; Yuriy Kovshov on Buket; Olga Klimko on Shipovnik; Olga Udodenko on Vidury	Switzerland; Otto Hofer on Andiamo; Daniel Ramseier on Random; Samuel Schatzmann on Rochus; Ulrich Lehmann on Xanthos
1991	(Germany) Donaueschingen	Germany; Isabell Werth on Gigolo; Nicole Uphoff on Rembrandt; Klaus Balkenhol on Goldstern; Sven Rothenberger on Andiamo	Soviet Union; Nina Menkova on Dikson; Yuriy Kovshov on Buket; Inna Zhurakovskaya on Podgon; Olga Klimko on Shipovnik	Netherlands; Anky van Grunsven on Bonfire; Sjef Janssen on Bo; Tineke Bartels on Duphar's Courage; Ellen Bontje on Larius
1993	(Slovenia) Lipica	Germany; Nicole Uphoff on Grand Gilbert; Klaus Balkenhol on Goldstern; Monica Theodorescu on Grunox; Isabell Werth on Gigolo	Great Britain; Ferdi Eilberg on Arun Tor; Richard Davison on Master JCB; Laura Fry on Quarryman; Emile Faurie on Virtu	Netherlands; Jeanette Haazen on Windsor; Leida Strijk on Jewel; Suzanne van Cuyk on Mr Jackson; Gonnelien Rothenberger on Ideaal
1995	(Luxembourg) Mondorf	Germany; Nicole Uphoff on Rembrandt; Klaus Balkenhol on Goldstern; Isabell Werth on Gigolo; Martin Schaudt on Durgo	Netherlands; Tineke Bartels on Barbria; Ellen Bontje on Silvano; Sven Rothenberger on Bo; Anky van Grunsven on Bonfire	France; Dominique Brieussel on Akazie; Dominique d'Esmé on Arnoldo Thor; Margit Otto-Crépin on Lucky Lord; Marie-Hélène Syre on Marlon
1997	(Germany) Verden	Germany; Isabell Werth on Gigolo; Karin Rehbein on Donnerhall; Ulla Salzgeber on Rusty; Nadine Capellmann on Gracioso	Netherlands; Sven Rothenberger on Weyden; Gonnelien Rothenberger on Bo; Anky van Grunsven on Bonfire; Ellen Bontje on Silvano	Sweden; Jan Brink on Kleber Martini; Louise Nathhorst on Walk On Top; Annette Solmell on Strauss; Ulla Håkansson on Bobby
1999	(Netherlands) Arnhem	Germany; Nadine Capellmann on Gracioso; Alexandra Simons de Ridder on Chacomo; Ulla Salzgeber on Rusty; Isabell Werth on Anthony	Netherlands; Anky van Grunsven on Bonfire; Ellen Bontje on Silvano; Coby van Baalen on Ferro; Arjen Teeuwissen on Goliath	Denmark; Lone Joergensen on Kennedy; Lars Petersen on Cavan; Jon Pedersen on Esprit d'Valdemar; Anne van Olst on Any How
2001	(Germany) Verden	Germany; Nadine Capellmann on Farbenfroh; Heike Kemmer on Albano; Ulla Salzgeber on Rusty; Isabell Werth on Anthony	Netherlands; Ellen Bontje on Silvano; Arjen Teeuwissen on Goliath; Gonnelien Rothenberger on Weyden; Anky van Grunsven on Idool	Denmark; Jon Pedersen on Esprit d'Valdemar; Lone Joergensen on Kennedy; Lars Petersen on Cavan; Nathalie zu Sayn-Wittgenstein on Fantast
2003	(United Kingdom) Hickstead	Germany; Ulla Salzgeber on Rusty; Heike Kemmer on Bonaparte; Klaus Husenbeth on Piccolino; Isabell Werth on Satchmo	Spain; Beatriz Ferrer-Salat on Beauvalais; Rafael Soto on Invasor; Ignacio Rambla on Distinguido; Juan Antonio Jimenez on Guizo	Great Britain; Emma Hindle on Weltmeyer; Nicola McGivern on Active Walero; Richard Davison on Ballaseyr Royale; Emile Faurie on Rascher Hopes
2005	(Germany) Hagen	Germany; Heike Kemmer on Bonaparte; Hubertus Schmidt on Wansuela Suerte; Ann-Kathrin Linsenhoff on Sterntaler; Klaus Husenbeth on Piccolino	Netherlands; Anky van Grunsven on Salinero; Edward Gal on Lingh; Laurens van Lieren on Ollright; Sven Rothenberger on Barclay II	Spain; Beatriz Ferrer-Salat on Beauvalais; Juan Antonio Jimenez on Guizo; Ignacio Rambla on Distinguido; José Ignacio López on Nevado Santa Clara; Sweden; Jan Brink on Briar; Tinne Vilhelmson-Silfvén on Just Mickey; Louise Nathhorst on Guinness
2007	(Italy) La Mandria	Netherlands; Hans Peter Minderhoud on Nadine; Laurens van Lieren on Ollright; Anky van Grunsven on Salinero; Imke Schellekens-Bartels on Sunrise	Germany; Monica Theodorescu on Whisper; Ellen Schulten-Baumer on Donatha; Nadine Capellmann on Elvis VA; Isabell Werth on Satchmo	Sweden; Per Sandgaard on Orient; Louise Nathhorst on Isidor; Tinne Vilhelmson-Silfvén on Solos Carex; Jan Brink on Briar
2009	(United Kingdom) Windsor	Netherlands; Imke Schellekens-Bartels on Sunrise; Adelinde Cornelissen on Parzival; Anky van Grunsven on Salinero; Edward Gal on Totilas	Great Britain; Maria Eilberg on Two Sox; Carl Hester on Liebling II; Laura Bechtolsheimer on Mistral Hojris; Emma Hindle on Lancet	Germany; Susanne Lebek on Potomac; Ellen Schulten-Baumer on Donatha; Matthias Alexander Rath on Sterntaler; Monica Theodorescu on Whisper
2011	(Netherlands) Rotterdam	Great Britain; Emile Faurie on Elmegardens Marquis; Charlotte Dujardin on Valegro; Carl Hester on Uthopia; Laura Bechtolsheimer on Mistral Hojris	Germany; Helen Langehanenberg on Damon Hill; Christoph Koschel on Donnperignon; Isabell Werth on El Santo; Matthias Alexander Rath on Totilas	Netherlands; Sander Marijnissen on Moedwill; Hans Peter Minderhoud on Nadine; Edward Gal on Sisther de Jeu; Adelinde Cornelissen on Parzival
2013	(Denmark) Herning	Germany; Fabienne Lütkemeier on d'Agostino; Isabell Werth on Don Johnson; Kristina Sprehe on Desperados; Helen Langehanenberg on Damon Hill	Netherlands; Danielle Heijkoop on Siro; Hans Peter Minderhoud on Romanov; Edward Gal on Undercover; Adelinde Cornelissen on Parzival	Great Britain; Charlotte Dujardin on Valegro; Carl Hester on Uthopia; Michael Eilberg on Half Moon Delphi; Gareth Hughes on Nadonna
2015	(Germany) Aachen	Netherlands; Patrick van der Meer on Uzzo; Hans Peter Minderhoud on Johnson; Edward Gal on Undercover; Diederik van Silfhout on Arlando	Great Britain; Charlotte Dujardin on Valegro; Carl Hester on Nip Tuck; Michael Eilberg on Marakov; Fiona Bigwood on Atterupgaards Orthilia	Germany; Jessica von Bredow-Werndl on Unee; Isabell Werth on Don Johnson; Kristina Bröring-Sprehe on Desperados; Matthias Alexander Rath on Totilas
2017	(Sweden) Gothenburg	Germany; Helen Langehanenberg on Damsey; Dorothee Schneider on Sammy Davis Jr. Sönke Rothenberger on Cosmo; Isabell Werth on Weihegold	Denmark; Agnete Kirk Thinggaard on Jojo; Anna Zibrandtsen on Arlando; Anna Kasprzak on Donnperignon; Cathrine Dufour on Atterupgaards Cassidy	Sweden; Rose Mathisen on Zuidenwind; Tinne Vilhelmson-Silfvén on Paridon Magi; Therese Nilshagen on Dante Weltino; Patrik Kittel on Delaunay
2019	(Netherlands) Rotterdam	Germany; Jessica von Bredow-Werndl on Dalera; Dorothee Schneider on Showtime; Sönke Rothenberger on Cosmo; Isabell Werth on Bella Rose	Netherlands; Anne Meulendijks on Avanti; Hans Peter Minderhoud on Dream Boy; Emmelie Scholtens on Desperado; Edward Gal on Zonik	Sweden; Antonia Ramel on Brother de Jeu; Juliette Ramel on Buriel; Therese Nilshagen on Dante Weltino; Patrik Kittel on Well Done de la Roche
2021	(Germany) Hagen	Germany; Jessica von Bredow-Werndl on Dalera; Dorothee Schneider on Faustus; Isabell Werth on Weihegold; Helen Langehanenberg on Annabelle	Great Britain; Charlotte Dujardin on Gio; Gareth Hughes on Sintano; Carl Hester on En Vogue; Charlotte Fry on Everdale	Denmark; Cathrine Dufour on Bohemian; Daniel Bachmann Andersen on Marshall-Bell; Nanna Skodborg Merrald on Orthilia; Charlotte Heering on Bufranco
2023	(Germany) Riesenbeck	Great Britain; Gareth Hughes on Classic Briolinca; Carl Hester on Fame; Charlotte Dujardin on Imhotep; Charlotte Fry on Glamourdale	Germany; Matthias Alexander Rath on Thiago GS; Isabell Werth on DSP Quantaz; Frederic Wandres on Bluetooth OLD; Jessica von Bredow-Werndl on TSF Dalera BB	Denmark; Daniel Bachmann Andersen on Vayron; Andreas Helgstrand on Jovian; Carina Cassøe Krüth on Heiline's Danciera; Nanna Skodborg Merrald on Blue Hors Zepter
2025	(France) Crozet	Germany; Isabell Werth on Wendy de Fontaine; Frederic Wandres on Bluetooth OLD; Katharina Hemmer on Denoix PCH; Ingrid Klimke on Vayron	Great Britain; Carl Hester on Fame; Charlotte Fry on Glamourdale; Becky Moody on Jagerbomb; Andrew Gould on Indigro	Denmark; Cathrine Laudrup-Dufour on Freestyle; Andreas Helgstrand on Jovian; Rikke Dupont on Grand Galiano; Nadja Aaboe Sloth on Favour Gersdorf

== All-time medal table (1963–2025) ==
Rank	Nation	Gold	Silver	Bronze	Total
1	Germany	50	26	16	92
2	Netherlands	10	13	12	35
3	Great Britain	6	8	8	22
4	Switzerland	4	7	7	18
5	Denmark	1	6	10	17
6	France	1	1	2	4
7	Austria	1	0	0	1
7	Belgium	1	0	0	1
9	Soviet Union	0	10	8	18
10	Sweden	0	1	8	9
11	Spain	0	1	3	4
12	East Germany	0	1	0	1
13	Hungary	0	0	1	1
Totals (13 entries)		74	74	75	223

- Note 1: Medal count is sorted by total gold medals, then total silver medals, then total bronze medals, then alphabetically.
- Note 2: Germany includes both Germany and West Germany.

== See also ==
- U25 European Dressage Championships (Charlotte Fry - 2021 European Dressage Championships)
- FEI Dressage European Championships for Young Riders and U25
- Jessica Mendoza (equestrian) - Pony Europeans, Junior Europeans (European Driving Championship)
- British Equestrian Federation
- Badminton Horse Trials

== Associate members ==
1. IDOC - International Dressage Officials Club
2. IDRC - International Dressage Riders Club
3. IDTC - International Dressage Trainers Club
4. IEOA - International Equestrian Organisers Alliance
5. IJOC - International Jumping Officials Club
6. JOC - Jumping Owners Club
7. IGEQ - International Group for Equestrian Qualificiations
8. IJRC - International Jumping Riders Club
