= Rembrandt (horse) =

Dressage horse

- Breed: Westphalian
- Sire: Romadour II (Westphalian)
- Grandsire: Romulus I (Westphalian)
- Dam: Adone (Westphalian)
- Maternal grandsire: Angelo (Thoroughbred)
- Sex: Gelding
- Foaled: 1977
- Country: Germany
- Colour: Dark Bay
- Breeder: Herbert de Baey
- Trainer: Klaus Balkenhol

Rembrandt
Medal record

Summer Olympics
Gold medal – first place	1988 Seoul	Team dressage
Gold medal – first place	1988 Seoul	Individual dressage
Gold medal – first place	1992 Barcelona	Team dressage
Gold medal – first place	1992 Barcelona	Individual dressage

World Championships
Gold medal – first place	1990 Stockholm	Individual dressage
Gold medal – first place	1990 Stockholm	Team dressage
Gold medal – first place	1994 The Hague	Team dressage
Silver medal – second place	1994 The Hague	Individual dressage

Rembrandt (15 March 1977 – 30 October 2001) was a dark bay Westphalian gelding ridden for Germany by Nicole Uphoff in dressage competitions. Together, the pair won four Olympic gold medals, three gold and one silver World Equestrian Games medals, and numerous other international championships. Although known as a sensitive horse prone to spookiness, Rembrandt's elegance and expression in the ring allowed him to become one of the top horses in the sport of dressage.

== Early life ==
Rembrandt was foaled in 1977 by Herbert de Baey. His sire was Romadour II, a famous Westphalian stallion during the 1970s, and his dam was Adone, full sister to Ahlerich, a multiple Olympic medal winning dressage horse under German rider Reiner Klimke. Due to his Thoroughbred-like appearance, several riders passed over a chance to purchase the gelding as a youngster. In 1981, he was purchased by Nicole Uphoff's father, Jürgen Uphoff, as a mount for his then-14-year-old daughter. Rembrandt was too much for her, however, and he was sent to train with Klaus Balkenhol, a noted trainer who saw his potential and advised the Uphoffs to keep the horse, despite his spookiness and sensitivity.

== Competitive career ==
In 1985, Rembrandt and Uphoff began to compete at events for young riders, and in 1986, the pair began working with Uwe Schulten-Baumer, a well-known dressage coach. In 1987, the pair began to compete, and win, at the international level. They rose to the top of the dressage world with unheard-of speed, due to Rembrandt's elegance and expression in the ring. Their rise to fame resulted in a 1988 Olympic nomination. Uphoff switched trainers four months before the Games began, leaving Schulten-Baumer to work with Harry Boldt, the German national coach.

Rembrandt and Uphoff were Olympic Champions twice, in 1988 in Seoul and 1992 in Barcelona. Both times they took both individual gold and a gold medal with the German team. The Barcelona games resulted in Rembrandt being titled a "living work of art" by one German sports commentator. During the last two years of his career, Rembrandt began to decline slightly, and he missed the team nomination to the 1996 Summer Olympics. Uphoff used her right as defending champion to compete as an individual, and they were again part of the German team in Atlanta, where the pair eventually placed 14th. This placement was despite being pulled from competition before the last round, due to an injury, at which point he was in 8th place. Rembrandt and Uphoff took both individual and team gold at the first World Equestrian Games in 1990. In 1993, he was injured by a kick from another horse during a victory lap at the German Championships, but recovered from the blow to take individual silver at the 1994 World Equestrian Games. The German team, including Uphoff, again took gold.

Rembrandt and Uphoff also competed at many other international-level events. In 1989, Rembrandt made his European Dressage Championships debut at Mondorf, Luxembourg, where they took both individual and team gold. It was the first time that the gold-medal winning German team (which had also won the previous 12 team golds) had been made up of four female riders. In 1991, at the Championships in Donaueschingen, Germany, the pair took silver in the Grand Prix Special, while again riding to gold as part of the German team. The silver medal was the first defeat in three years for the pair, and was dealt by another Schulten-Baumer student, Isabell Werth on Gigolo FRH. At the 1995 Championships, held in Mondorf, Luxembourg, Rembrandt again assisted the German team to a gold medal, while taking 5th individually. The pair also won seven times at the Stuttgart German Masters international show, the last in 1995. This was a record number of wins until 2010, when Werth won for an eighth time, and Uphoff remains the only rider to have won seven masters titles on a single horse (Werth rode three different horses to her eight victories).

== Later life and legacy ==
In 1996, Rembrandt and Uphoff gave a farewell show at his official retirement at the Stuttgart Indoor Show. He spent the rest of his life at Uphoff's farm. On October 30, 2001, he was euthanized after his health deteriorated quickly and he was unable to rise.

Rembrandt's transitions, particularly from passage to extended trot back to passage, have been called "unequalled". He was also known for his spookiness, however, to the point that crowds hushed themselves when he was performing. He is known as a "legendary" dressage horse, and mounted upon Rembrandt, Nicole Uphoff pioneered an era of female-dominated dressage competitions.

In 2009, Uphoff donated Rembrandt's saddle to the equestrian museum at CHIO Aachen in Germany.
