= Tineke Bartels =

Dutch equestrian (born 1951)

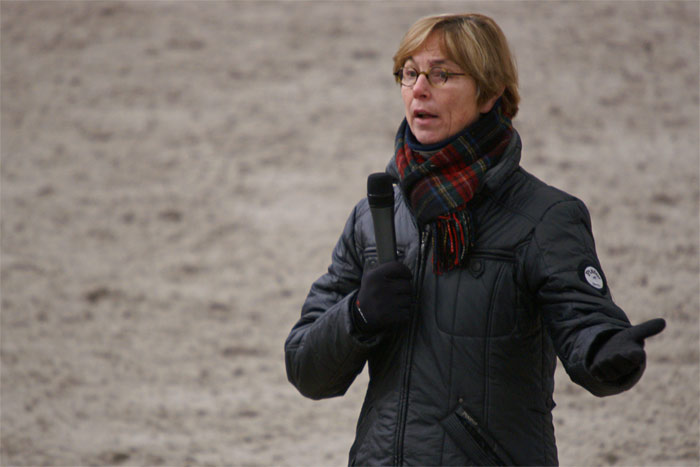

Personal information
- Born: 6 February 1951 (age 75)
Medal record
Equestrian
Representing the Netherlands
Olympic Games
| Silver medal – second place | 1992 Barcelona | Team dressage |
| Silver medal – second place | 1996 Atlanta | Team dressage |
World Championships
| Silver medal – second place | 1986 Cedar Valley | Team dressage |
European Championships
| Silver medal – second place | 1995 Mondorf | Team dressage |
| Bronze medal – third place | 1987 Goodwood | Team dressage |
| Bronze medal – third place | 1991 Donaueschingen | Team dressage |

Martina Maria Anna Antonia "Tineke" Bartels-de Vries (born 6 February 1951 in Eindhoven) is an equestrian from the Netherlands, who won the silver medal in the Team Dressage Event at the 1992 Summer Olympics in Barcelona, Spain. She did so alongside Annemarie Sanders, Ellen Bontje, and Anky van Grunsven. In the Individual Competition she finished in fifteenth position.

== Biography ==
Four years later Bartels repeated that feat, this time with Van Grunsven and the couple Gonnelien and Sven Rothenberger. She competed in four Summer Olympics for her native country, starting in 1984. Her daughter Imke competed at the 2004 Summer Olympics in Athens, Greece.

Bartels was heavily injured on 7 November 2006 after she fell off her horse during a training. She fell with her head against a tree and will need a long time to recover. It is unsure whether she can continue her career.
