= Rothenberger =

Rothenberger is a surname. Notable people with the surname include:

- Anneliese Rothenberger (1924–2010), German operatic soprano
- Curt Rothenberger (1896–1959), German jurist
- Gonnelien Rothenberger (born 1969), Dutch equestrian
- Sven Rothenberger (born 1966), German equestrian
