= Uwe Schulten-Baumer =

German equestrian (1926–2014)

Medal record

Equestrian

Representing West Germany

World Championships
Gold medal – first place	1978 Goodwood	Team dressage
Gold medal – first place	1982 Lausanne	Team dressage
Silver medal – second place	1978 Goodwood	Individual dressage
Bronze medal – third place	1982 Lausanne	Individual dressage

European Championships
Gold medal – first place	1977 St. Gallen	Team dressage
Gold medal – first place	1979 Aarhus	Team dressage
Gold medal – first place	1981 Laxenburg	Team dressage
Gold medal – first place	1981 Laxenburg	Individual dressage
Gold medal – first place	1983 Aachen	Team dressage
Gold medal – first place	1985 Copenhagen	Team dressage
Bronze medal – third place	1977 St. Gallen	Individual dressage

Uwe Schulten-Baumer (14 January 1926 – 28 October 2014), nicknamed "Der Doktor" (The Doctor), was a German show jumping and dressage rider who became an internationally famous dressage trainer and coach who worked with Nicole Uphoff and Isabell Werth, who won 4 and 5, respectively, Olympic gold medals in individual and team dressage.

== Early life ==
Schulten-Baumer was born in Kettwig, Essen, Germany. The son of a farmer, he became interested in horses early in life. He helped groom horses at a riding academy across from his school, later he learned to ride there. During his military service he was in the navy, and on Saturdays he would ride the commander's horses. After World War II, he rode the horse Senta at the international show jumping competition CHIO Aachen in 1952. Later he acquired the gelding Glückspiel from noted dressage trainer Fritz Tempelmann. Riding Glückspiel, Schulten-Baumer focused solely on dressage and began to train other riders.

== Career ==
Schulten-Baumer worked as a manager in the steel and cement industry, and was a member of the board of the "Roheisen-Verband" (Pig iron association). Due to these commitments, he decided to concentrate on training horses and dressage riders rather than participate in competition himself. Among his first students were his son Uwe and his daughter Alexa, as well as Margit Otto-Crépin and Italian rider Pia Lau.

Beginning in 1986, he began to work with Nicole Uphoff, and a year later she first won a Grand Prix Spécial in Lausanne, with Rembrandt. Several national and international awards followed. In 1986 he also began to coach Isabell Werth, whom he asked to ride his own horses, including Gigolo FRH, Nicole Uphoff and Isabell Werth are just further proof of his dressage knowledge and skill. The collaboration lasted until 2001, when Werth left to work with another trainer. Werth, however, continued to identify Schulten-Baumer as one of the most significant influences on her career. Part of the reason for the split was linked to "problems" between Werth and Ellen Schulten-Baumer, his stepdaughter, who thereafter took over the training of two horses previously assigned to Werth. Ellen Schulten-Baumer went on to compete in the European Dressage Championships in both 2007 and 2009.

He also helped develop and train a number of promising young dressage horses, including Gigolo FRH whom he purchased in 1989 and was successfully shown by Werth to four gold and two silver Olympic medals. Schulten-Baumer owned the horse until its death in 2009. He also developed and promoted the horse Satchmo, which he purchased as a two-year-old.

== Awards ==
The Deutsche Reiterliche Vereinigung (German Equestrian Federation), a member of the International Federation for Equestrian Sports, awarded him the title "Reitmeister" (Riding Master) on 28 August 2005, a title given in recognition of exceptional achievements. Other awards included the 1974 Grand Medal of the Pferdesportverband Rheinland (Equestrian Association of the Rhineland, PSVR), the 1981 Silver Plaque for Exceptional Achievement in equestrian sport, and 1988 St. Georgs-Plakette (Badge of St. George's) from the PSVR. In 1992 and 1997 he was proclaimed Trainer of the Year by the International Dressage Trainers' Club (IDTC). At the 2005 CHIO Aachen he was awarded the "Silbernes Pferd" (Silver Horse) for his lifetime achievement and the German Rider's Cross in Gold. In 2007, he won the P.S.I. Award in recognition of his work selecting and training talented young horses for dressage and show jumping. In 2009, he was awarded the Order of Merit of the Federal Republic of Germany. Twice, in 1999 and 2002, he won the Otto-Lörke-Preis of the Deutsches Olympiade-Komitee für Reiterei for the most successful rising young Grand Prix horse of the year.

== Rollkur ==
Schulten-Baumer is considered by some to be the inventor of the controversial "deep and round" training method known as Rollkur, or hyperflexion. However, both proponents and opponents of Rollkur have disagreed on this point. Sjef Janssen, the Dutch national team dressage coach and spouse of Anky van Grunsven, both known for their use of Rollkur, stated that the Rollkur system Janssen created was "totally different" from the training techniques of Schulten-Baumer. German Olympic team member Klaus Balkenhol, now dressage coach for the United States Equestrian Team and opponent of Rollkur training, also stated: "There were horses in Germany, which have been set low, for example, those from the training of Dr. Schulten-Baumer, but there was always the stretching and relaxation in the forehand. But what Sjef Janssen did in recent years, was something else."

== Bibliography ==
- Collins, David (2006). "Dr. Uwe Schulten-Baumer". Dressage Masters: Techniques and Philosophies of Four Legendary Trainers. Guilford, Connecticut: The Lyons Press. pp. 85–108. ISBN 978-159228-674-4.
