= Johann Hinnemann =

German equestrian (born 1948)

Personal information
- Born: August 29, 1948 (age 76)
Medal record
Equestrian
Representing Germany
World Championships
Bronze medal – third place	1986 Cedar Valley	Individual dressage
Gold medal – first place	1986 Cedar Valley	Team dressage
European Championships
Bronze medal – third place	1987 Goodwood	Individual dressage
Gold medal – first place	1987 Goodwood	Team dressage

Johan Hinnemann (born August 29, 1948) is a German equestrian and trainer. He won a bronze medal in individual dressage and a golden team medal in team dressage at the 1986 World Dressage Championships in Cedar Valley. At the 1987 European Dressage Championships in Goodwood Hinnemann also won a bronze individual medal and a golden team medal.

He is still active as trainer and has trained several Olympians such as Coby van Baalen, Marlies van Baalen, Heike Kemmer, Steffen Peters and Ulla Salzgeber. He also served as team trainer for Canada, The Netherlands, Germany and most recently the Irish dressage team until 2023. Hinnemann resides both in Germany and in California, USA.
