= Gabriela Grillo =

German equestrian (1952–2024)

- Grillo in the 1970s
- Born: 19 August 1952; Duisburg, West Germany
- Died: 25 February 2024 (aged 71); Mülheim, Germany
- Awards: Order of Merit of the Federal Republic of Germany
- Sports career
- Sport: Equestrian
Medal record
Equestrian
Representing West Germany
Olympic Games
Gold medal – first place	1976 Montreal	Team dressage
World Championships
Gold medal – first place	1978 Goodwood	Team dressage
Gold medal – first place	1982 Lausanne	Team dressage
European Championships
Gold medal – first place	1977 St. Gallen	Team dressage
Gold medal – first place	1979 Aarhus	Team dressage
Gold medal – first place	1981 Laxenburg	Team dressage
Bronze medal – third place	1981 Laxenburg	Individual dressage

Gabriela Grillo (19 August 1952 – 25 February 2024) was a German businesswoman, equestrian and Olympic champion. She won a gold medal in team dressage and placed fourth in individual dressage at the 1976 Summer Olympics in Montreal. She achieved gold medals with the team at three European championships.

She also worked as a journalist and book author on riding topics. From 1993, she held leading positions in the family business, as CEO and then as a member of the supervisory board. She supported the training of young talents. She served voluntarily several foundations supporting a hospital in Duisburg, citizens of Duisburg and Mülheim, and the University of Duisburg.

== Life and career ==
Grillo was born in Duisburg on 19 August 1952, the daughter of Herbert and Marita Grillo. Her father traded metals, running the Grillo-Handelshaus and the Grillo-Werke AG. She had a brother, Rainer. The parents loved horses, and she had riding lessons from age six. She completed school with the Abitur at the Frau-Rath-Goethe-Gymnasium in Duisburg in 1971, and then studied musicology, German studies and theatre studies at the University of Cologne. She trained riding from 1960 to 1966 with Otto Fuhrmann, then until 1973 with Walter Günther, and from 1974 with Albert Stecken. She achieved the Goldenes Reiterabzeichen qualification in 1969.

At the 1976 Summer Olympics in Montreal, she won a gold medal in team dressage, placing fourth in individual dressage. She rode Ultimo, a Trakehner black horse born in 1965, alongside Harry Boldt and Reiner Klimke.

She was German champion three times, with different horses: Ultimo, Galapagos and Grandison. In world championships, she won gold twice, also with the team, and two victories at the Deutsches Dressur Derby, again with Ultimo. In the 1981 European competition, she won bronze in the singles and gold with the team, riding Galapagos. She belonged to the German dressage team until 1982.

She also worked as a journalist and for charity. From 1980, she was a regular contributor to the trade magazine Reiten und Fahren (later part of St.GEORG), and wrote books such as 60 Worte Reiterdeutsch, about riding terms, in 1979.

Grillo was elected to the board of the department of dressage in the Deutscher Reiter- und Fahrerverband (DRFV) association in 1981. She became CEO of the Wilhelm Grillo Handelsgesellschaft in 1993 and, in 1995, also the speaker of the board of the Grillo-Werke AG. From 2004, she was a member of the supervisory board of the Grillo-Werke AG, serving as its president until 2021. Since 2015, in cooperation with Grillo, the Familie Herbert Grillo foundation and the Stiftung Deutscher Pferdesport sponsored the training of young talents in dressage through scholarships.

She held voluntary positions, including as a member of the board of trustees of the Stiftung zur Förderung evangelischer Krankenhäuser from 2010. The foundation began as an initiative of her father and others to sponsor the building of the present Protestant hospital in Duisburg-Nord. She was also a member of the supervisory board of the Bürgerstiftung Duisburg, a citizens' foundation, president of the supervisory board of the Bürgerstiftung Mülheim, and member of the board of the Förderverein Duisburger Universitäts-Gesellschaft, supporting the University of Duisburg.

Grillo died in Mülheim, where she lived, on 25 February 2024, at the age of 71.

== Awards ==
Grillo received the Silbernes Lorbeerblatt in 1976 after winning the Olympic gold medal. She was the 2010 recipient of the Luther-Rose of the Internationale Martin Luther Stiftung. She was awarded the Order of Merit of the Federal Republic of Germany in 2021, in recognition of her extraordinary engagement in social, cultural, trades and sports matters.
