= Gyula Dallos =

Hungarian dressage rider

Personal information
- Full name: Gyula Dallos
- Born: April 11, 1950 (age 76)
Medal record
Equestrian
Representing Hungary
European Championships
Bronze medal – third place	1993 Lipica	Freestyle dressage

Gyula Dallos (born 11 April 1950) is a Hungarian dressage rider and horse trainer. He won a bronze medal at the 1993 European Dressage Championships.

Dallos found his career-making horse Aktion in 1989. They went on to compete at two World Equestrian Games (in 1994 and 1998), four European Dressage Championships (in 1991, 1993, 1997 and 1999) and six World Cup Finals.

Dallos was set to compete at the 1992 Barcelona Olympics, however Aktion suffered viral pneumonia shortly after arriving to the competition site, which sidelined them from taking part. They were scheduled to make Hungary's Olympic debut in dressage, and were considered a medal outsiders following a podium finish at the CHIO Aachen shortly before the Games. At the 1993 European Championships, Dallos and Aktion won a freestyle bronze, the first major dressage medal won for Hungary.

Dallos was once again set to compete at the 1996 Atlanta Olympics, however Aktion failed to pass the horse inspection going into the competition.

In total, Dallos achieved 154 international victories aboard Aktion, which include 11 World Cup qualifiers and 11 Hungarian Championships.
