= Nicole Uphoff =

German equestrian

Personal information
- Born: 25 January 1967 (age 59) Duisburg, West Germany
- Height: 1.73 m (5 ft 8 in)
- Weight: 60 kg (132 lb)

Sport
- Sport: Equestrianism
- Club: FTR Mülheim, Mülheim an der Ruhr
Medal record
Equestrian
Representing West Germany
Olympic Games
Gold medal – first place	1988 Seoul	Individual dressage
Gold medal – first place	1988 Seoul	Team dressage
European Championships
Gold medal – first place	1989 Mondorf	Individual dressage
Gold medal – first place	1989 Mondorf	Team dressage
Representing Germany
Olympic Games
Gold medal – first place	1992 Barcelona	Individual dressage
Gold medal – first place	1992 Barcelona	Team dressage
World Championships
Gold medal – first place	1990 Stockholm	Individual dressage
Gold medal – first place	1990 Stockholm	Team dressage
Gold medal – first place	1994 The Hague	Team dressage
Silver medal – second place	1994 The Hague	Spécial dressage
European Championships
Gold medal – first place	1991 Donaueschingen	Team dressage
Gold medal – first place	1993 Lipica	Freestyle dressage
Gold medal – first place	1993 Lipica	Team dressage
Gold medal – first place	1995 Mondorf	Team dressage
Silver medal – second place	1991 Donaueschingen	Spécial dressage

Nicole Uphoff (born 25 January 1967) is a German equestrian who competes in the sport of dressage. She won four gold medals in individual and team competition at the 1988 and 1992 Summer Olympics. Riding her star horse, Rembrandt, Uphoff also won numerous other international competitions, including the World Equestrian Games and the European Dressage Championships.

== Personal life ==
Uphoff married international show jumper Otto Becker in the early 1990s, but the pair separated in late 2007 and later divorced. In January 2004, Uphoff gave birth to her first child, a son named Patrick. Long-time boyfriend Travis Morgan was the baby's father.

== Competitive career ==
In 1985, Uphoff, riding Rembrandt, began to compete at events for young riders, and in 1986, the pair began working with Uwe Schulten-Baumer, a well-known dressage coach. In 1987, they began to compete, and win, at the international level. They rose to the top of the dressage world with unheard-of speed, due to Rembrandt's elegance and expression in the ring. Their rise to fame resulted in a 1988 Olympic nomination. Uphoff switched trainers four months before the Games began, leaving Schulten-Baumer to work with Harry Boldt, the German national coach.

Rembrandt and Uphoff were Olympic Champions twice, in 1988 in Seoul and 1992 in Barcelona. Both times they took both individual gold and a gold medal with the German team. The Barcelona games resulted in Rembrandt being titled a "living work of art" by one German sports commentator. During the last two years of his career, Rembrandt began to decline slightly, and he missed the team nomination to the 1996 Summer Olympics. Uphoff used her right as defending champion to compete as an individual, and they were again part of the German delegation in Atlanta, where they placed 14th. This placement was despite being pulled from competition before the last round, due to an injury, at which point they were in 8th place. Uphoff and Rembrandt also took both individual and team gold at the first World Equestrian Games in 1990. In 1993, he was injured by a kick from another horse during a victory lap at the German Championships, but recovered from the blow to take individual silver at the 1994 World Equestrian Games. The German team, including Uphoff, again took gold.

Uphoff and Rembrandt also competed at many other international-level events. In 1989, Rembrandt made his European Dressage Championships debut at Mondorf, Luxembourg, where they took both individual and team gold. It was the first time that the gold medal-winning German team (which had also won the previous 12 team golds) had been made up of four female riders. In 1991, at the Championships in Donaueschingen, Germany, the pair took silver in the Grand Prix Special, while again riding to gold as part of the German team. The silver medal was the first defeat in three years for the pair, and was dealt by another Schulten-Baumer student, Isabell Werth on Gigolo FRH. At the 1995 Championships, held in Mondorf, Luxembourg, Uphoff again assisted the German team to a gold medal, while taking 5th individually. The pair also won seven times at the Stuttgart German Masters international show, the last in 1995. This was a record number of wins until 2010, when Werth won for an eighth time, and Uphoff remains the only rider to have won seven masters titles on a single horse (Werth rode three different horses to her eight victories).

In 1996, Uphoff and Rembrandt gave a farewell show at his official retirement at the Stuttgart Indoor Show. Rembrandt spent the rest of his life at Uphoff's farm. On 30 October 2001, he was euthanized after his health deteriorated quickly and he was unable to rise. Rembrandt's transitions, particularly from passage to extended trot back to passage, have been called "unequalled". He was also known for his spookiness, however, to the point that crowds hushed themselves when he was performing. He is known as a "legendary" dressage horse, and mounted upon Rembrandt, Nicole Uphoff pioneered an era of female-dominated dressage competitions. In 2009, Uphoff donated Rembrandt's saddle to the equestrian museum at CHIO Aachen in Germany.

After the 1996 Olympics and Rembrandt's retirement, Uphoff faded from the dressage world for several years, unable to find a mount that could win in international competition. However, in early 1998, she began riding Borbet Rubinstein and soon returned to international prominence, winning the 1999 CDI Frankfurt. She also began training several of Rubinstein's offspring. In 1999, she appeared on German television, giving dressage commentary, and was named the German Sportswoman of the Year. There was speculation that she may make a bid for the 2000 Olympic team. She did not compete in the 2000 Olympics, and by early 2013, she had officially retired from competition.
