= Tinne Vilhelmson-Silfvén =

Swedish equestrian

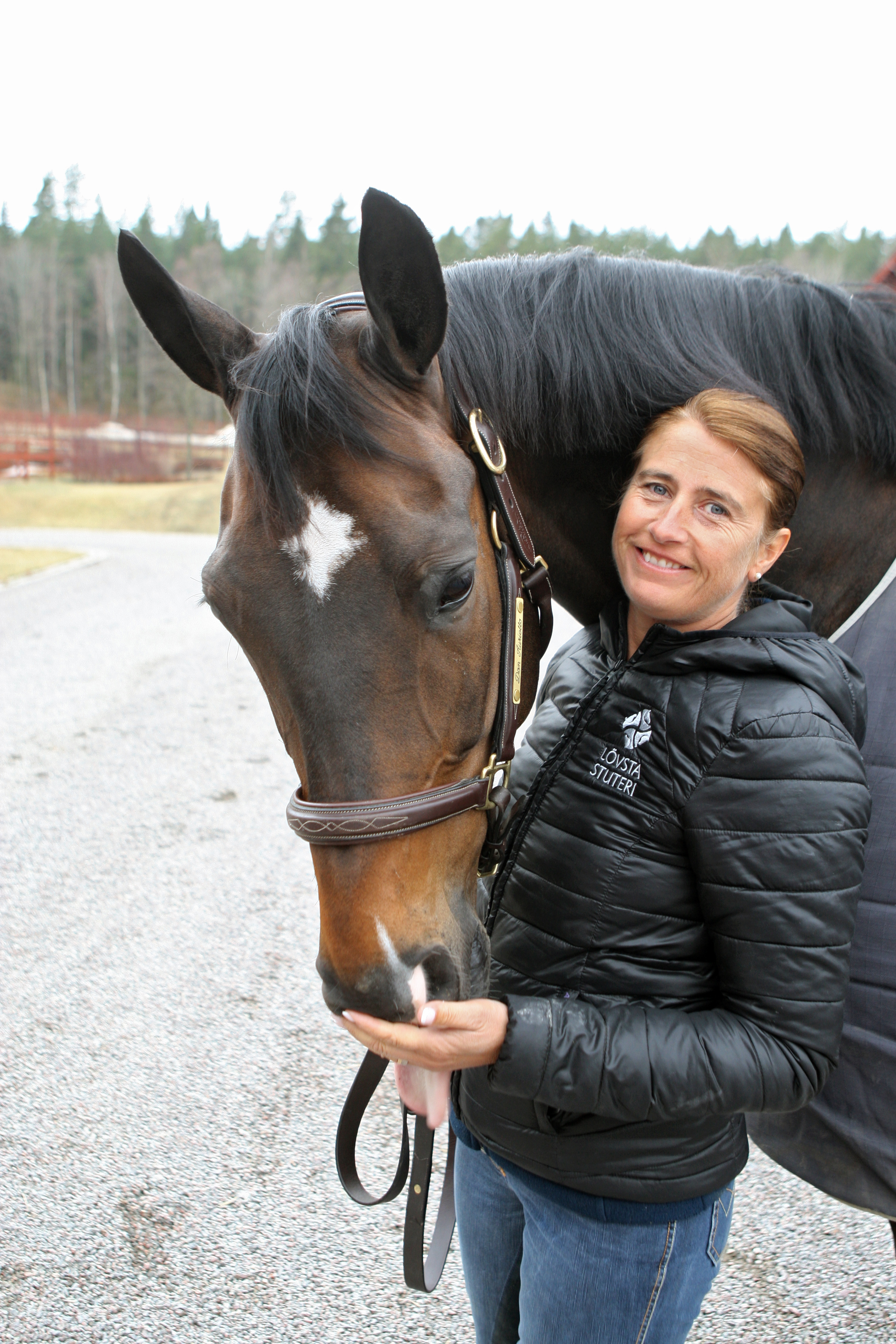
- Tinne Vilhelmson-Silfvén with Don Auriello

Personal information
- Born: 12 July 1967 (age 58) Stockholm, Sweden
Medal record
Representing Sweden
Equestrian
European Championships
Bronze medal – third place	2005 Hagen	Team dressage
Bronze medal – third place	2007 La Mandria	Team dressage
Bronze medal – third place	2017 Gothenburg	Team dressage
World Cup
Silver medal – second place	2016 Gothenburg	Individual dressage

Tinne Eva Caroline Vilhelmson-Silfvén (born 12 July 1967) is a Swedish horse rider. Representing Sweden, she competed at seven Summer Olympics (1992, 1996, 2000, 2004, 2008, 2012 and 2016). She placed 4th in team dressage in 1992, and in team dressage in Beijing in 2008. Meanwhile, her current best individual Olympic placement is 8th place from 2016 Olympics.

Tinne also competed at six World Equestrian Games (in 1994, 2002, 2006, 2010, 2014 and 2018) and at eleven European Dressage Championships (in 1993, 1995, 2001, 2005, 2007, 2009, 2011, 2013, 2015 and 2017). She has won three bronze medals in team competitions at European championships, in 2003, 2007, and 2017.

She also competed at seven editions of Dressage World Cup finals (in 2004, 2010, 2012, 2013, 2014, 2016, and 2019). In 2013 and 2014 she narrowly missed the podium finish and placed 4th. At the 2016 finals held in Gothenburg, Sweden, Tinne finished in a runner-up position, narrowly behind Hans Peter Minderhoud of the Netherlands.
