= 2005 European Dressage Championships =

24th edition of European Dressage Championship

- Host city: Hagen, Germany
- Date(s): 28–31 July 2005
- Level: Senior
- Events: 3 Team, GP Special, GP Freestyle
- Records set: 0

The 2005 FEI European Dressage Championships, was the 24th edition of the European Dressage Championship. It was held at Hof Kasselmann in Hagen, Germany, from 28 July to 31 July 2005. The 2005 European Dressage Championships was previously allocated to Moscow, Russia but due financial problems of the organizer they were not able to organise the Championships and had to withdraw two weeks before the start. Ulrich Kasselmann jumped in as last minute organizer of the European Championships and organised the show at the same date as Moscow was supposed to organise.

== Judges ==
The following judges were appointed to officiate during the European Dressage Championships.

- (Germany) Gotthilf Riexinger (Ground Jury President)
- (Denmark) Hanne Valentin (Ground Jury Member)
- (Netherlands) Francis Verbeek (Ground Jury Member)
- (Italy) Vincenzo Truppa (Ground Jury Member)
- (Canada) Cara Whitham (Ground Jury Member)
- (Belgium) Mariëtte Withages (Ground Jury Member)
- (France) Bernard Maurel (Ground Jury Member)

== Medal summary ==
=== Medal table ===
Rank	Nation	Gold	Silver	Bronze	Total
1	Germany (GER)	1	1	0	2
1	Netherlands (NED)	1	1	0	2
3	Sweden (SWE)	0	0	2	2
4	Spain (ESP)	0	0	1	1
Totals (4 entries)		2	2	3	7

=== Medalists ===
Event	Gold	Silver	Bronze
Individual dressage	(Netherlands) Anky van Grunsven on Salinero	(Germany) Hubertus Schmidt on Wansuela Suerte	(Sweden) Jan Brink on Björsells Briar 899
Team dressage	Germany; Hubertus Schmidt on Wansuela Suerte; Klaus Husenbeth on Piccolo; Ann-Kathrin Linsenhoff on Sterntaler-Unicef; Heike Kemmer on Bonaparte	Netherlands; Anky van Grunsven on Keltec Salinero; Edward Gal on Geldnet Lingh; Laurens van Lieren on Hexagon's Ollright; Sven Rothenberger on Barclay II	Sweden; Jan Brink on Björsells Briar 899; Louise Nathorst on Isador; Kristian von Krusenstierna on Wilson; Tinne Vilhelmson-Silfvén on Just Mickey Spain; Ignacio Rambla on Distiguido 2 Beatriz Ferrer-Salat on Beauvalais; José Ignacio López on Nevado Santa Clara; Juan Antonio Jimenez on Guizo
