= Margit Otto-Crépin =

French equestrian (1945–2020)

Personal information
- Born: 19 February 1945 Saarbrücken, Westmark, Germany
- Died: 19 April 2020 (aged 75) Hamburg, Germany
Medal record
Equestrian
Representing France
Olympic Games
Silver medal – second place	1988 Seoul	Individual dressage
European Championships
Gold medal – first place	1987 Goodwood	Individual dressage
Silver medal – second place	1989 Mondorf	Individual dressage
Bronze medal – third place	1991 Donaueschingen	Spécial dressage
Bronze medal – third place	1995 Mondorf	Team dressage

Margit Otto-Crépin (19 February 1945 – 19 April 2020) was a German-born French equestrian.

She won a silver medal at 1988 Summer Olympics in Seoul, behind Nicole Uphoff. She was trained by Fritz Tempelmann and Uwe Schulten-Baumer. Born in Germany, she adopted French nationality in 1971.

Otto-Crépin died in Hamburg on 19 April 2020 at age 75 following an illness.
