= 2007 European Dressage Championships =

- Host city: Turin, Italy
- Date(s): 30 August - 2 September 2007
- Level: Senior
- Events: 3 Team, GP Special, GP Freestyle
- Records set: 1

The 2007 FEI European Dressage Championships, was the 25th edition of the European Dressage Championship. It was held at La Mandria in Turin, Italy, from August 30 to September 2, 2007.

== Medal summary ==
=== Medal table ===
Rank	Nation	Gold	Silver	Bronze	Total
1	Netherlands (NED)	2	1	2	5
2	Germany (GER)	1	2	0	3
3	Sweden (SWE)	0	0	1	1
Totals (3 entries)		3	3	3	9

=== Medalists ===
Event	Gold	Silver	Bronze
Individual freestyle dressage	(Netherlands) Anky van Grunsven on Salinero	(Germany) Isabell Werth on Satchmo	(Netherlands) Imke Schellekens-Bartels on Sunrise
Individual special dressage	(Germany) Isabell Werth on Satchmo	(Netherlands) Anky van Grunsven on Salinero	(Netherlands) Imke Schellekens-Bartels on Sunrise
Team dressage	Netherlands; Anky van Grunsven on Salinero; Hans-Peter Minderhoud on Eqxuis Nadine; Laurens van Lieren on Hexagon's Ollright; Imke Schellekens-Bartels on Sunrise	Germany; Isabell Werth on Satchmo; Monica Theodorescu on Whisper 128; Nadine Capellmann on Elvis VA; Ellen Schulten-Baumer on Donate S	Sweden; Jan Brink on Bjorsells Brair; Louise Nathorst on Isador; Per Sandgaard on Oridor; Tinne Vilhelmson-Silfvén on Solos Carex
