= Annemarie Sanders =

Dutch equestrian (born 1958)

Personal information
- Born: 3 April 1958 (age 68) Koog aan de Zaan, North Holland, Netherlands
Medal record
Equestrian
Representing the Netherlands
Olympic Games
Silver medal – second place	1992 Barcelona	Team dressage
World Championships
Silver medal – second place	1986 Cedar Valley	Team dressage
European Championships
Bronze medal – third place	1987 Goodwood	Team dressage

Annemarie Sanders-Keijzer (born 3 April 1958) is an equestrian from the Netherlands, who won the silver medal in the Team Dressage Event at the 1992 Summer Olympics in Barcelona, Spain. She did so alongside Tineke Bartels, Ellen Bontje, and Anky van Grunsven. In the individual competition Sanders finished in 40th position. She competed in three Summer Olympics for her native country, starting in 1984.
