= 1990 FEI World Equestrian Games =

- Host city: Stockholm, Sweden
- Nations: 37
- Events: 13 in 6 disciplines
- Opening: 24 July 1990
- Closing: 5 August 1990

The 1990 FEI World Equestrian Games were held in Stockholm, Sweden from July 24 to August 5, 1990. They were the first edition of the games which are held every four years and run by the FEI.

== Events ==
13 events in 6 disciplines were held in Stockholm.

| Dressage | Driving | Endurance | Eventing | Jumping | Vaulting |
|---|---|---|---|---|---|
| Individual | Individual | Individual | Individual | Individual | Individual Female |
| Individual | Individual | Individual | Individual | Individual | Individual Male |
| Team | Team | Team | Team | Team | Team |

== Medal summary ==
=== Medalists ===
| Event | Gold | Silver | Bronze |
|---|---|---|---|
| Individual dressage | Nicole Uphoff on Rembrandt; West Germany | Kyra Kyrklund on Matador; Finland | Monica Theodorescu on Ganimedes; West Germany |
| Team dressage | West Germany (FRG); Nicole Uphoff on Rembrandt; Monica Theodorescu on Ganimedes; Ann-Kathrin Kroth on Golfstom; Sven Rothenberger on Ideaal | Soviet Union (URS); Yuriy Kovshov on Bouket; Olga Klimko on Shipovnik; Valery Tishkov on Kholst; Nina Menkova on Dikson | Switzerland (SUI); Samuel Schatzmann on Rochus; Christine Stückelberger on Gauguin; Silvia Iklé on Spada; Daniel Ramseier on Random |
| Individual driving | Tomas Eriksson; Sweden | József Bozsik; Hungary | Ijsbrand Chardon; Netherlands |
| Team driving | Sweden (SWE); Christer Pahlsson; Jan-Erik Pahlsson; Tomas Eriksson | Netherlands (NED); Ad Aarts; Ijsbrand Chardon; Theo Weusthof | Hungary (HUN); József Bozsik; Lajos Sipos; Laszlo Juhasz |
| Individual endurance | Becky Hart on RD Grand Sulton; United States | Jane Donovan on Ibriz; Great Britain | June Petersen on Abbeline Lionel; Australia |
| Team endurance | Great Britain (GBR); Elizabeth Finney on Show Girl II; Judith Heeley on Shumac; Joy Loyla on General Portfolio Hero; Lilla Wall on Alfie | Belgium (BEL); Dominique Crutzen on Domino de Sier; Armand de Merode on Perlita; Jean-Luc Marchal on Mamlouk; Marcel Rossius on Arafat | Spain (ESP); Juan Alvarez on Muntcho; Pascual Alvarez on Melfenik; José Manzano on Olga; Roser Xalabarder on Kid |
| Individual eventing | Blyth Tait on Messiah; New Zealand | Ian Stark on Murphy Himself; Great Britain | Bruce Davidson on Pirate Lion; United States |
| Team eventing | New Zealand (NZL); Mark Todd on Bahlua; Blyth Tait on Messiah; Andrew Scott on Umptee; Andrew Nicholson on Spinning Rhombus | Great Britain (GBR); Ian Stark on Murphy Himself; Virginia Leng on Griffin; Rodney Powell on The Irishman II; Karen Straker on Get Smart | West Germany (FRG); Herbert Blöcker on Feine Dame; Marina Loheit on Sundance Kid; Matthias Naumann on Alabaster; Edith Beine on Kyang |
| Individual jumping | Eric Navet on Quito de Baussy; France | John Whitaker on Henderson Milton; Great Britain | Hubert Bourdy on Morgat; France |
| Team jumping | France (FRA); Eric Navet on Quito de Baussy; Hubert Bourdy on Morgat; Roger-Yves Bost on Norton de Rhuys; Pierre Durand on Jappeloup | West Germany (FRG); Karsten Huck on Nepomuk; René Tebbel on Borsu Urchin; Otto Becker on Optiebeurs Pamina; Ludger Beerbaum on Almox Gazelle | Great Britain (GBR); Nick Skelton on Alan Paul Grand Slam; Michael Whitaker on Henderson Mon Santa; David Broome on Lennegan; John Whitaker on Henderson Milton |
| Men's vaulting | Michael Lehner on Zarewitsch; West Germany | Christoph Lensing on Rascal; West Germany | Dietmar Otto on Mainzelmann; West Germany |
| Women's vaulting | Silke Bernhard on Mainzelmann; West Germany | Silke Michelberger on Zarewitsch; West Germany | Ute Schönlan on Marco Polo; West Germany |
| Squad vaulting | Switzerland (SUI) | West Germany (FRG) | United States (USA) |

=== Medal count ===
* Host nation (Sweden)

| Rank | Nation | Gold | Silver | Bronze | Total |
|---|---|---|---|---|---|
| 1 | West Germany (FRG) | 4 | 4 | 4 | 12 |
| 2 | France (FRA) | 2 | 0 | 1 | 3 |
| 3 | New Zealand (NZL) | 2 | 0 | 0 | 2 |
| 3 | Sweden (SWE)* | 2 | 0 | 0 | 2 |
| 5 | Great Britain (GBR) | 1 | 4 | 1 | 6 |
| 6 | United States (USA) | 1 | 0 | 2 | 3 |
| 7 | Switzerland (SUI) | 1 | 0 | 1 | 2 |
| 8 | Hungary (HUN) | 0 | 1 | 1 | 2 |
| 8 | Netherlands (NED) | 0 | 1 | 1 | 2 |
| 10 | Belgium (BEL) | 0 | 1 | 0 | 1 |
| 10 | Finland (FIN) | 0 | 1 | 0 | 1 |
| 10 | Soviet Union (URS) | 0 | 1 | 0 | 1 |
| 13 | Australia (AUS) | 0 | 0 | 1 | 1 |
| 13 | Spain (ESP) | 0 | 0 | 1 | 1 |
| Totals (14 entries) | | 13 | 13 | 13 | 39 |

== Officials ==
Appointment of (Olympic disciplines) officials is as follows:

Dressage

- (Switzerland) Wolfgang Niggli (Ground Jury President)
- (Sweden) William Hamilton (Ground Jury Member)
- (West Germany) Heinz Schütte (Ground Jury Member)
- (Soviet Union) Elena Kondratieva (Ground Jury Member)
- (Japan) Eizo Osaka (Ground Jury Member)
