= Jesper Frismann =

Danish dressage rider (born 1961)

Jesper Firsmann
Personal information
- Born: 21 March 1961 (age 65)

Sport
- Sport: Equestrian
Medal record
Equestrian
Representing Denmark
European Championships
Silver medal – second place	1985 Copenhagen	Team dressage

Jesper Frismann (born 21 March 1961) is a Danish dressage rider, who participated for the Danish silver medalist team at the European Dressage Championship in Copenhagen in 1985, on the horse Clermont.

Today, Jesper Frismann owns a dressage stable near Elsinore, Denmark. Jesper Frismann's teaching is based on the correct posture of the rider and always takes an offset to the horse. In addition, Jesper Frismann always puts great emphasis in the horse being correctly warmed up and loosened, before starting the individual dressage lessons.
