= Montevideo (horse) =

- Breed: Holsteiner
- Sire: Marlon (Thoroughbred)
- Grandsire: Tamerlane (Thoroughbred)
- Dam: Afrika (Holsteiner)
- Maternal grandsire: Roman (Holsteiner)
- Foaled: 1971
- Country: Germany
- Colour: Bay

Montevideo
Medal record

Equestrian

Olympic Games
Gold medal – first place	1984 Los Angeles	Team Dressage

European Championships
Gold medal – first place	1983 Aachen	Team Dressage
Bronze medal – third place	1983 Aachen	Individual Dressage
Gold medal – first place	1985 Copenhagen	Team Dressage

Montevideo was a Holsteiner horse ridden by Uwe Sauer for West Germany in international level dressage competitions between 1983 and 1992.

Montevideo and Sauer competed in the 1983 European Championships, where they took an individual bronze and helped the West German team to back-to-back team golds in the 1983 and 1985 European Championships. The pair also competed at the 1984 Olympics in Los Angeles, where they took a team gold and 6th individually. Other major accomplishments include a team gold and an individual silver at the 1984 German Championships and an individual silver at the 1985 German Championships.

== Pedigree ==
Pedigree of Montevideo
Sire Marlon Thoroughbred 1958	Tamerlane; Thoroughbred; 1952	Persian Gulf; Thoroughbred; 1940	Bahram – 1932
Sire Marlon Thoroughbred 1958	Tamerlane; Thoroughbred; 1952	Persian Gulf; Thoroughbred; 1940	Double Life – 1926
Sire Marlon Thoroughbred 1958	Tamerlane; Thoroughbred; 1952	Eastern Empress; Thoroughbred; 1944	Nearco – 1935
Sire Marlon Thoroughbred 1958	Tamerlane; Thoroughbred; 1952	Eastern Empress; Thoroughbred; 1944	Cheveley Lady – 1939
Sire Marlon Thoroughbred 1958	Maralinni; Thoroughbred; 1950	Fairford; Thoroughbred; 1934	Fairway – 1925
Sire Marlon Thoroughbred 1958	Maralinni; Thoroughbred; 1950	Fairford; Thoroughbred; 1934	Pallet Crag – 1928
Sire Marlon Thoroughbred 1958	Maralinni; Thoroughbred; 1950	Misguided; Thoroughbred; 1937	Knight of the Garter – 1921
Sire Marlon Thoroughbred 1958	Maralinni; Thoroughbred; 1950	Misguided; Thoroughbred; 1937	Miss Privet – 1923
Dam Afrika Holsteiner ~1965	Roman; Holsteiner; 1960	Ramzes; Anglo-Arab; 1937	Rittersporn – 1917
Dam Afrika Holsteiner ~1965	Roman; Holsteiner; 1960	Ramzes; Anglo-Arab; 1937	Jordi – 1928
Dam Afrika Holsteiner ~1965	Roman; Holsteiner; 1960	Dorette; Holsteiner; 1948	Monarch – 1941
Dam Afrika Holsteiner ~1965	Roman; Holsteiner; 1960	Dorette; Holsteiner; 1948	Schelle – 1940
Dam Afrika Holsteiner ~1965	Tuja; Holsteiner; ~1957	Faehnrich; Holsteiner; 1953	Fachmann – 1949
Dam Afrika Holsteiner ~1965	Tuja; Holsteiner; ~1957	Faehnrich; Holsteiner; 1953	Fera – 1947
Dam Afrika Holsteiner ~1965	Tuja; Holsteiner; ~1957	Ostende; Holsteiner; ~1950	Loewenjaeger – 1943
Dam Afrika Holsteiner ~1965	Tuja; Holsteiner; ~1957	Ostende; Holsteiner; ~1950	Duenaburg - ~1945
