= Louise Nathhorst =

Swedish equestrian

Personal information
- Nationality: Swedish
- Born: 26 May 1955 (age 71)

Sport
- Sport: Equestrian
Medal record
Equestrian
Representing Sweden
Olympic Games
Bronze medal – third place	1984 Los Angeles	Team dressage
World Championships
Bronze medal – third place	1998 Rome	Team dressage
European Championships
Bronze medal – third place	1997 Verden	Team dressage
Bronze medal – third place	2005 Hagen	Team dressage
Bronze medal – third place	2007 La Mandria	Team dressage
Dressage World Cup
Gold medal – first place	1998 Göteborg	Individual dressage

Louise Nathhorst (born 26 May 1955) is a Swedish equestrian and Olympic medalist. She was born in Stockholm. She won a bronze medal in dressage at the 1984 Summer Olympics in Los Angeles.

She won the 1997/98 edition of the FEI Dressage World Cup.
