= Ann-Kathrin Linsenhoff =

German equestrian

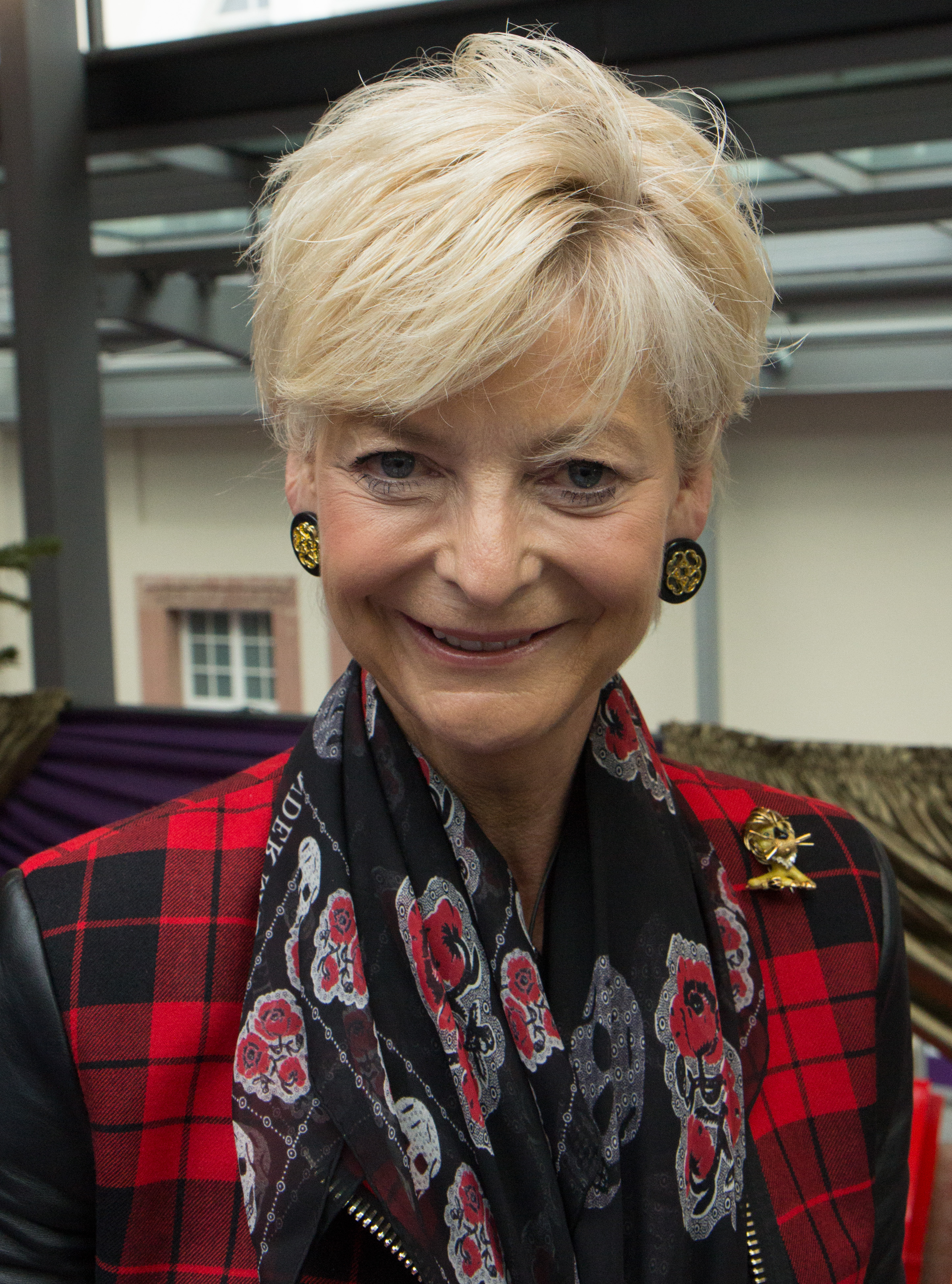
- Festhallen Reitturnier Frankfurt 2017

Medal record

Equestrian

Representing West Germany

Olympic Games
Gold medal – first place	1988 Seoul	Team dressage

European Championships
Gold medal – first place	1987 Goodwood	Team dressage
Gold medal – first place	1989 Mondorf	Team dressage
Silver medal – second place	1987 Goodwood	Individual dressage
Bronze medal – third place	1989 Mondorf	Individual dressage

Representing Germany

World Championships
Gold medal – first place	1990 Stockholm	Team dressage
Gold medal – first place	2002 Jerez	Team dressage

European Championships
Gold medal – first place	2005 Hagen	Team dressage

Ann-Kathrin Linsenhoff (born 1 August 1960, in Düsseldorf) is a German equestrian and Olympic champion. She won a gold medal in team dressage at the 1988 Summer Olympics in Seoul.

She is daughter of equestrian and Olympic champion Liselott Linsenhoff. She was appointed UNICEF Goodwill Ambassador in 2002.
