= Olga Klimko =

Soviet equestrian

Personal information
- Nationality: Moldavian
- Born: 7 January 1960 (age 66)

Sport
- Sport: Equestrian
Medal record
Equestrian
Representing the Soviet Union
World Championships
Silver medal – second place	1990 Stockholm	Team dressage
European Championships
Silver medal – second place	1989 Mondorf	Team dressage
Silver medal – second place	1991 Donaueschingen	Team dressage
Bronze medal – third place	1985 Copenhagen	Team dressage
Friendship Games
Gold medal – first place	1984 Wałbrzych	Team dressage

Olga Klimko (born 7 January 1960) is a Moldavian equestrian. She competed at the 1988 Summer Olympics and the 1992 Summer Olympics.
