= José Ignacio López =

Spanish dressage rider

Personal information
- Full name: José Ignacio López Porras
- Born: August 1, 1970 (age 55)
Medal record
Equestrian
Representing Spain
European Championships
Bronze medal – third place	2005 Hagen	Team dressage

José Ignacio López Porras (born 1 August 1970) is a Spanish dressage rider. He won a team bronze medal at the 2005 European Dressage Championships aboard Nevado Santa Clara. He also competed at the 2006 World Equestrian Games.
