= Nina Menkova =

Russian equestrian

Personal information
- Nationality: Russian
- Born: 25 December 1945 (age 80) Yekaterinburg, Russia

Sport
- Sport: Equestrian
Medal record
Equestrian
Representing the Soviet Union
World Championships
Silver medal – second place	1990 Stockholm	Team dressage
European Championships
Silver medal – second place	1989 Mondorf	Team dressage
Silver medal – second place	1991 Donaueschingen	Team dressage
Bronze medal – third place	1991 Donaueschingen	Freestyle dressage
World Cup
Silver medal – second place	1991 Paris	Individual dressage
Bronze medal – third place	1989 Gothenburg	Individual dressage
Bronze medal – third place	1990 Den Bosch	Individual dressage

Nina Menkova (born 25 December 1945) is a Russian equestrian. She competed in two events at the 1988 Summer Olympics.
