= Uwe Sauer =

German equestrian

Medal record

Equestrian

Representing West Germany

Olympic Games
Gold medal – first place	1984 Los Angeles	Team dressage

European Championships
Gold medal – first place	1983 Aachen	Team dressage
Gold medal – first place	1985 Copenhagen	Team dressage
Bronze medal – third place	1983 Aachen	Individual dressage

Uwe Sauer (born 30 August 1943) is a German equestrian and Olympic champion. He was born in Hamburg. He won a gold medal in team dressage at the 1984 Summer Olympics in Los Angeles with Montevideo.

Montevideo and Sauer competed in the 1983 European Championships, where they took an individual bronze and helped the West German team to back-to-back team golds in the 1983 and 1985 European Championships. The pair also competed at the 1984 Olympics in Los Angeles, where they took a team gold and 6th individually. Other major accomplishments include a team gold and an individual silver at the 1984 German Championships and an individual silver at the 1985 German Championships.
