= Ulrich Lehmann =

Swiss equestrian

Personal information
- Born: 26 January 1944 (age 82)
Medal record
Equestrian
Representing Switzerland
Olympic Games
Silver medal – second place	1976 Montreal	Team dressage
World Championships
Silver medal – second place	1978 Goodwood	Team dressage
Bronze medal – third place	1986 Cedar Valley	Team dressage
European Championships
Silver medal – second place	1977 St. Gallen	Team dressage
Silver medal – second place	1981 Laxenburg	Team dressage
Silver medal – second place	1987 Goodwood	Team dressage
Bronze medal – third place	1975 Kiev	Team dressage
Bronze medal – third place	1979 Aarhus	Team dressage
Bronze medal – third place	1989 Mondorf	Team dressage

Ulrich Lehmann (born 26 January 1944) is a Swiss equestrian. He won a silver medal in team dressage at the 1976 Summer Olympics in Montreal, together with Christine Stückelberger and Doris Ramseier.
