= Sönke Rothenberger =

German equestrian

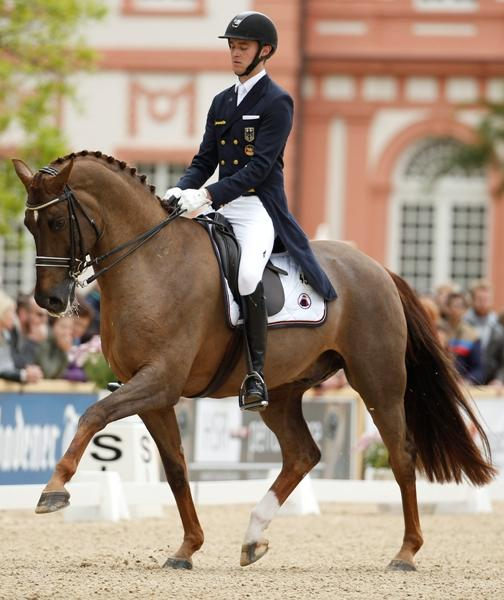
- Sönke Rothenberger and Favourit (2016)

Personal information
- Nationality: German
- Born: 14 October 1994 (age 31)
- Height: 1.93 m (6 ft 4 in)
- Weight: 73 kg (161 lb)

Sport
- Country: Germany
- Sport: Equestrianism
Medal record
Equestrian
Representing Germany
Olympic Games
Gold medal – first place	2016 Rio de Janeiro	Team dressage
World Championships
Gold medal – first place	2018 Tryon	Team dressage
European Championships
Gold medal – first place	2017 Gothenburg	Team dressage
Gold medal – first place	2019 Rotterdam	Team dressage
Silver medal – second place	2017 Gothenburg	Spécial dressage
Silver medal – second place	2017 Gothenburg	Freestyle dressage

Sönke Rothenberger (born 14 October 1994) is a German Olympic equestrian. He represented his country at the 2016 Summer Olympics, where he finished in 19th place in the individual dressage competition. He was also part of the German dressage team which won the gold medal in the team dressage competition. In 2024 he was the first traveling reserve for the German dressage team at the 2024 Olympic Games in Paris.

Sönke is the only son of dressage riders Sven and Gonnelien Rothenberger, multiple Olympic medalists from 1996 Summer Olympics. German-born Sven switched to the Netherlands after marrying Gonnelien. Meanwhile, Sönke, as well as his sisters Sanneke and Semmieke, have been representing Germany since the start of their international careers.

== International championship results ==
Results
Year	Event	Horse	Score	Placing	Notes
2007	European Pony Championships	Deinhard B	72.947%	1st place, gold medalist(s)	Team
2007	European Pony Championships	Deinhard B	73.000%	3rd place, bronze medalist(s)	Individual
2008	European Pony Championships	Deinhard B		1st place, gold medalist(s)	Team
2008	European Pony Championships	Deinhard B		1st place, gold medalist(s)	Individual
2009	European Pony Championships	Deinhard B		1st place, gold medalist(s)	Team
2009	European Pony Championships	Deinhard B		2nd place, silver medalist(s)	Individual
2009	European Pony Championships	Deinhard B		15th	Individual Freestyle
2014	European Young Rider Championships	Cosmo 59	75.632%	1st place, gold medalist(s)	Team
2014	European Young Rider Championships	Cosmo 59	74.500%	3rd place, bronze medalist(s)	Individual
2014	European Young Rider Championships	Cosmo 59	73.330%	9th	Individual Freestyle
2016	Olympic Games	Cosmo 59	77.329%	1st place, gold medalist(s)	Team
2016	Olympic Games	Cosmo 59	76.271%	10th	Individual Special
2017	European Championships	Cosmo 59	78.343%	1st place, gold medalist(s)	Team
2017	European Championships	Cosmo 59	82.479%	2nd place, silver medalist(s)	Individual Special
2017	European Championships	Cosmo 59	90.614%	2nd place, silver medalist(s)	Individual Freestyle
2018	World Equestrian Games	Cosmo 59	81.444%	1st place, gold medalist(s)	Team
2018	World Equestrian Games	Cosmo 59	81.277%	4th	Individual Special
2019	European Championships	Cosmo 59	79.084%	1st place, gold medalist(s)	Team
2019	European Championships	Cosmo 59	78.115%	6th	Individual Special

== Notable horses ==
- Deinhard B - 1999 Palomino German Riding Pony Stallion (Dornick B x Golden Dancer)
  - 2007 European Pony Championships - Team Gold Medal, Individual Bronze Medal
  - 2008 European Pony Championships - Team Gold Medal, Individual Gold Medal
  - 2009 European Pony Championships - Team Gold Medal, Individual Silver Medal, Individual 15th Place Freestyle
- Cosmo 59 - 2007 Bay Dutch Warmblood Gelding (Van Gogh x Fruhling)
  - 2014 European Young Rider Championships - Team Gold Medal, Individual Bronze Medal, Individual Ninth Place Freestyle
  - 2016 Rio Olympics - Team Gold Medal, Individual 19th Place
  - 2017 European Championships - Team Gold Medal, Individual Silver Medal, Individual Silver Medal Freestyle
  - 2018 World Equestrian Games - Team Gold Medal
