= Doris Ramseier =

Swiss equestrian

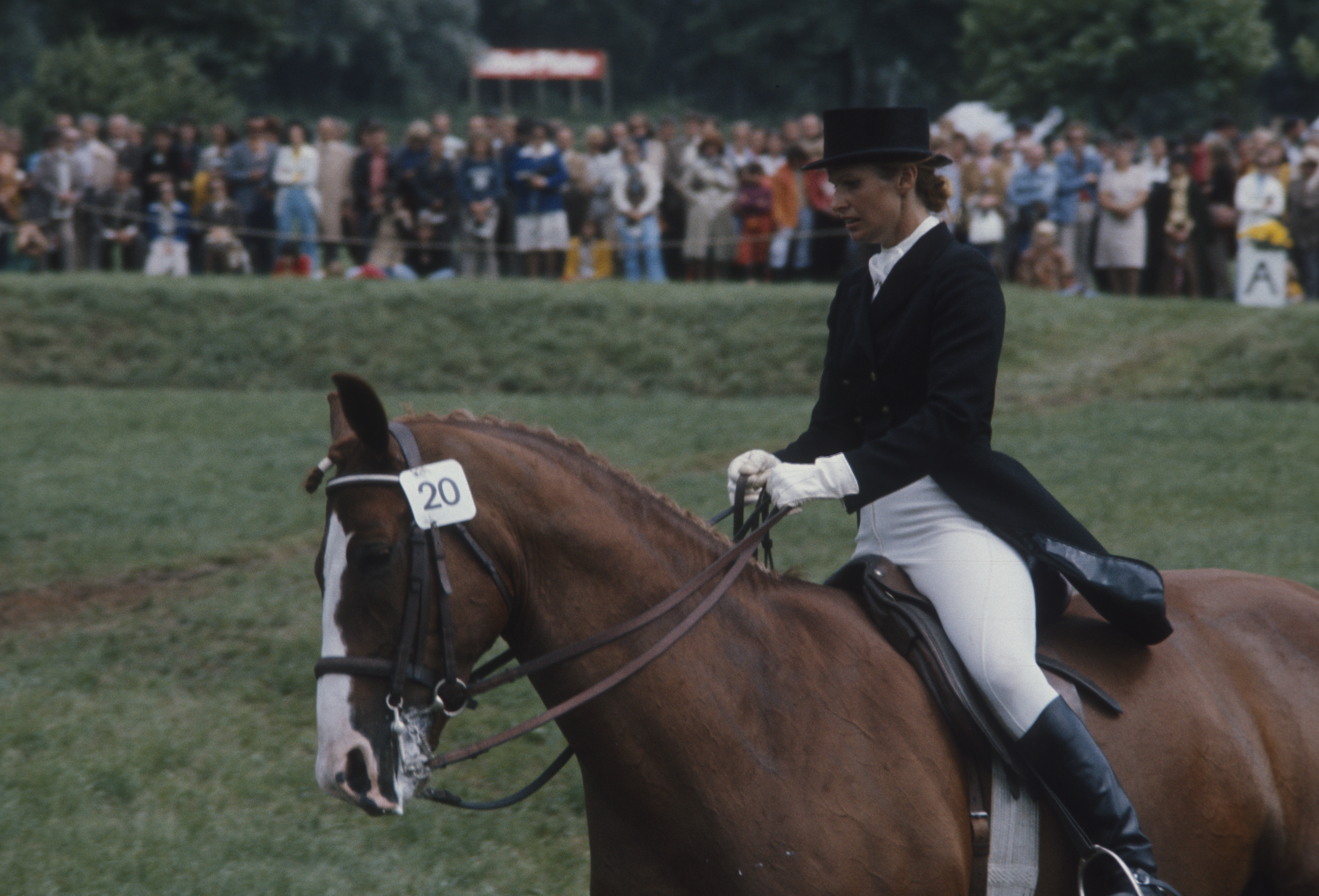

Personal information
- Born: 18 May 1939 (age 87)
Medal record
Equestrian
Representing Switzerland
Olympic Games
| Silver medal – second place | 1976 Montreal | Team dressage |
World Championships
| Silver medal – second place | 1982 Lausanne | Team dressage |
| Bronze medal – third place | 1986 Cedar Valley | Team dressage |
European Championships
| Bronze medal – third place | 1975 Kiev | Team dressage |

Doris Ramseier (born 18 May 1939) is a Swiss equestrian. She won a silver medal in team dressage at the 1976 Summer Olympics in Montreal, together with Christine Stückelberger and Ulrich Lehmann. She also competed at the 1992 Summer Olympics.
