= Imke Schellekens-Bartels =

Dutch equestrian (born 1977)

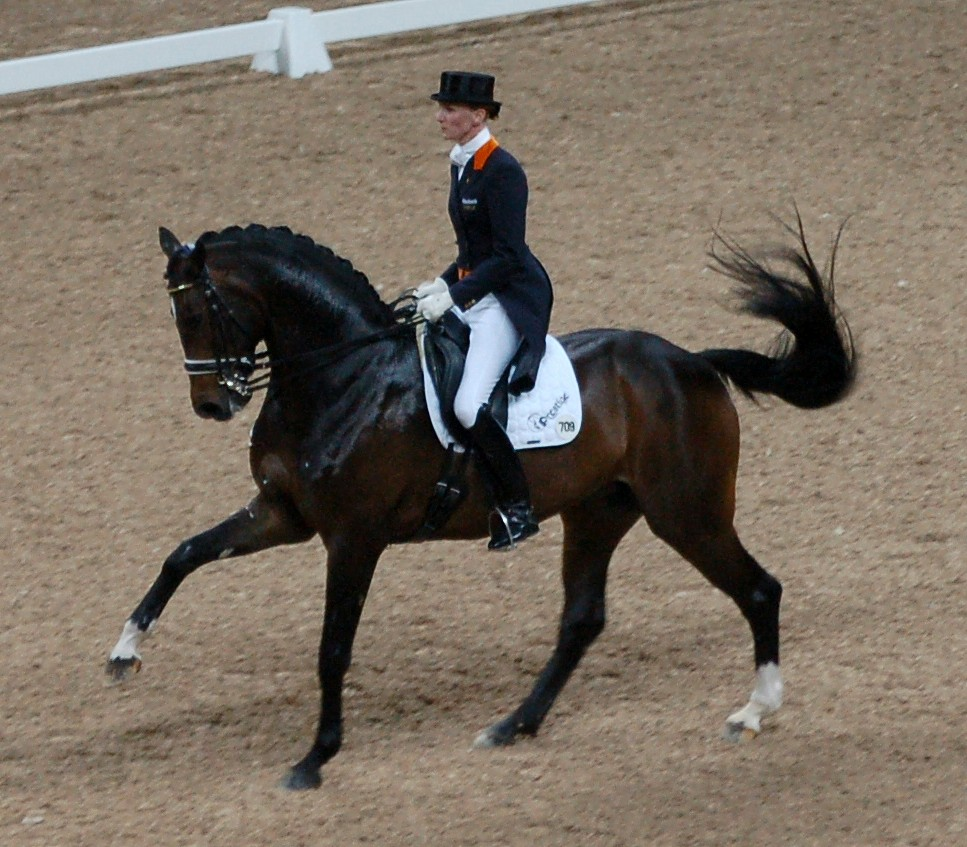
- Imke Schellekens-Bartels

Medal record

Equestrian

Representing the Netherlands

Olympic Games
Silver medal – second place	2008 Beijing	Team dressage

World Championships
Gold medal – first place	2010 Kentucky	Team dressage
Silver medal – second place	2006 Aachen	Team dressage

European Championships
Gold medal – first place	2007 La Mandria	Team dressage
Gold medal – first place	2009 Windsor	Team dressage
Bronze medal – third place	2007 La Mandria	Spécial dressage
Bronze medal – third place	2007 La Mandria	Freestyle dressage

World Cup
Bronze medal – third place	2010 Den Bosch	Individual dressage

Imke Anne Marian Schellekens-Bartels (born 15 March 1977, in Hooge Mierde) is an equestrian from the Netherlands, who competed at the 2004 Summer Olympics in Athens, Greece and at the 2008 Summer Olympics in Beijing, China. She was the first reserve for the Dutch team at the 2012 Summer Olympics in London, United Kingdom. Her mother Tineke was also a competitor in dressage and competed at several Olympic Games between 1984 and 1996.
