= Arjen Teeuwissen =

Dutch equestrian (1971–2024)

Personal information
- Full name: Arjen Gerald Teeuwissen
- Born: 29 March 1971 Mook en Middelaar, Netherlands
- Died: 29 May 2024 (aged 53) Zoersel, Belgium
Medal record
Equestrian
Representing the Netherlands
Olympic Games
Silver medal – second place	2000 Sydney	Team dressage
European Championships
Silver medal – second place	1999 Arnhem	Team dressage
Silver medal – second place	2001 Verden	Team dressage
Silver medal – second place	2001 Verden	Individual dressage
Bronze medal – third place	1999 Arnhem	Individual dressage

Arjen Gerald Teeuwissen (29 March 1971 – 29 May 2024) was a Dutch equestrian, who won the silver medal in the Team Dressage event at the 2000 Summer Olympics in Sydney, Australia. He did so alongside Anky van Grunsven, Ellen Bontje, and Coby van Baalen.

Teeuwissen was one of eight LGBT Olympians, who were also equestrians at the 2000 Olympic Games. At the medal ceremony of the team dressage, the three men of the twelve who were awarded medals were all gay men, Robert Dover and Guenter Seidel (both USA, bronze) and Teeuwissen. He died in Zoersel, Belgium on 29 May 2024, aged 53.
