= 1994 FEI World Equestrian Games =

- Host city: The Hague, Netherlands
- Nations: 37
- Events: 14 in 6 disciplines
- Opening: 27 July 1994
- Closing: 7 August 1994

The 1994 FEI World Equestrian Games were held in The Hague, Netherlands from 27 July to 7 August 1994. They were the second edition of the Games which are held every four years and run by the FEI.

== Events ==
14 events in 6 disciplines were held in The Hague.

Dressage	Driving	Endurance	Eventing	Jumping	Vaulting
Individual Special, Individual Freestyle	Individual	Individual	Individual	Individual	Individual Female
Individual Special, Individual Freestyle	Individual	Individual	Individual	Individual	Individual Male
Team	Team	Team	Team	Team	Team

== Medal summary ==
=== Medalists ===
Event	Gold	Silver	Bronze
Individual special dressage	Isabell Werth on Gigolo; Germany	Nicole Uphoff on Rembrandt; Germany	Sven Rothenberger on Dondolo; Netherlands
Individual freestyle dressage	Anky van Grunsven on Bonfire; Netherlands	Klaus Balkenhol on Goldstern; Germany	Karin Rehbein on Donerhall; Germany
Team dressage	Germany (GER); Nicole Uphoff on Rembrandt; Klaus Balkenhol on Goldstern; Isabell Werth on Gigolo; Karin Rehbein on Donerhall	Netherlands (NED); Ellen Bontje on Heuriger; Sven Rothenberger on Dondolo; Anky van Grunsven on Bonfire	United States (USA); Kathleen Raine on Avontuur; Robert Dover on Devereaux; Gary Rockwell on Suna; Carol Lavell on Gifted
Individual driving	Michael Freund; Germany	George Bowman; Great Britain	Ijsbrand Chardon; Netherlands
Team driving	Germany (GER); Christoph Sandmann; Michael Freund; Hansjoerg Hammann	Belgium (BEL); Felix Brasseur; Eddy van Dijck; Valere Standaert	Netherlands (NED); Ad Aarts; Ijsbrand Chardon; Harry de Ruyter
Individual endurance	Valerie Kanavy on Pieraz; United States	Dennis Pesce on Melfenik; France	Stephane Fleury on Roc'H; France
Team endurance	France (FRA); Stephane Fleury on Roc'H; Martine Jollivet on Lizazat; Jacques David on Nelson I Bénédicte Atger on Sunday d'Aurabelle	Spain (ESP); Miguel Vila Ubach on Bajeque; Francisco Cobos on Bruja; Augusta Albarran on Colores; Gerardo Amian on Klux Klux	Australia (AUS); Christine Forrester on Mandala Galactic; Melonia de Jong on Vet School Laurance; Barbara Timms on Kildara Sharina; Meg Wade on Glenallan Sheida
Individual eventing	Vaughn Jefferis on Bounce; New Zealand	Dorothy Trapp on Murphy Holokai; United States	Karen Dixon on Get Smart; Great Britain
Team eventing	Great Britain (GBR); Karen Dixon on Get Smart; Mary Thomson on King William; Charlotte Bathe on The Cool Customer; Kristina Gifford on General Jock	France (FRA); Jean-Lou Bigot on Twist La Beige; Jean Teulere on Rodosto; Marie-Christine Duroy on Summer Song	Germany (GER); Bettina Overesch on Watermill Stream; Cord Mysegaes on Ricardo; Ralf Ehrenbrink on Kildare
Individual jumping	Franke Sloothaak on San Patrignano Weihaiwej; Germany	Michel Robert on Miss San Patrignano; France	Sören von Rönne on Taggi; Germany
Team jumping	Germany (GER); Franke Sloothaak on San Patrignano Weihaiwej; Soren von Ronne on Taggi; Dirk Hafemeister on P.S. Priamos; Ludger Beerbaum on Almox Ratina	France (FRA); Roger-Yves Bost on Souviens Toi III Equus; Philippe Rozier on Baiko Rocco; Eric Navet on Quito de Baussy; Michel Robert on Miss San Patrignano	Switzerland (SUI); Thomas Fuchs on Major AC Folien; Stefan Lauber on Lugana II; Markus Fuchs on Interpane Goldfights; Lesley McNaught-Mändli on Piroi
Men's vaulting	Thomas Fiskbaek on Hamlet; Denmark	Christoph Lensing on Aladin; Germany	Thomas Föcking on Aladin; Germany
Women's vaulting	Tanja Bendetto on Zarewitsch; Germany	Kerith Lemon on Maxwell; United States	Mieke Lorentz on Falun; Germany
Squad vaulting	Switzerland (SUI)	Germany (GER)	Sweden (SWE)

=== Medal count ===
* Host nation (Netherlands)

Rank	Nation	Gold	Silver	Bronze	Total
1	Germany (GER)	7	4	5	16
2	France (FRA)	1	4	1	6
3	United States (USA)	1	2	1	4
4	Netherlands (NED)*	1	1	3	5
5	Great Britain (GBR)	1	1	1	3
6	Switzerland (SUI)	1	0	1	2
7	Denmark (DEN)	1	0	0	1
7	New Zealand (NZL)	1	0	0	1
9	Belgium (BEL)	0	1	0	1
9	Spain (ESP)	0	1	0	1
11	Australia (AUS)	0	0	1	1
11	Sweden (SWE)	0	0	1	1
Totals (12 entries)		14	14	14	42

== Officials ==
Appointment of (Olympic disciplines) officials is as follows:

Dressage

- (Netherlands) Nico H. van Stigt (Ground Jury President)
- (New Zealand) Nicholas Williams (Ground Jury Member)
- (Germany) Heinz Schütte (Ground Jury Member)
- (Sweden) Eric Lette (Ground Jury Member)
- (Belgium) Mariette Withages (Ground Jury Member)
