= Monica Theodorescu =

German equestrian

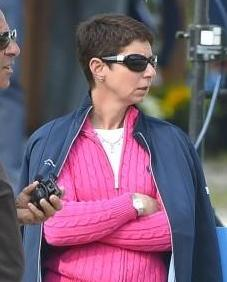
- Monica Theodorescu in 2015

Personal information
- Born: 2 March 1963 (age 63) Halle, North Rhine-Westphalia, West Germany
- Height: 1.65 m (5 ft 5 in)
- Weight: 55 kg (121 lb)

Sport
- Sport: Equestrianism
- Club: RFV Warendorf
Medal record
Representing West Germany
Olympic Games
Gold medal – first place	1988 Seoul	Team dressage
European Championships
Gold medal – first place	1989 Mondorf	Team dressage
Representing Germany
Olympic Games
Gold medal – first place	1992 Barcelona	Team dressage
Gold medal – first place	1996 Atlanta	Team dressage
World Championships
Gold medal – first place	1990 Stockholm	Team dressage
Bronze medal – third place	1990 Stockholm	Individual dressage
European Championships
Gold medal – first place	1993 Lipica	Team dressage
Silver medal – second place	1993 Lipica	Spécial dressage
Silver medal – second place	2007 La Mandria	Team dressage
Bronze medal – third place	2009 Windsor	Team dressage

Monica Theodorescu (born 2 March 1963) is a German retired equestrian and dressage rider.

== Biography ==
Born in Halle, North Rhine-Westphalia, Monica Theodorescu is the daughter of the German, former Romanian, dressage rider George Theodorescu and the German show jumping rider Inge Theodorescu (born as Inge Fellgiebel). Inge Fellgiebel was the daughter of Hans Fellgiebel, the brother of Erich Fellgiebel, a "July 20th" conspirator. Monica was successful for 30 years as a rider in the international world of dressage. Her last team medal came at the European Championships at Windsor, England, in 2009.

In 2012, German Olympic Equestrian Committee appointed Theodorescu the new German dressage team trainer.
