= Ignacio Rambla =

Spanish equestrian

Medal record

Equestrian

Representing Spain

Olympic Games
Silver medal – second place	2004 Athens	Team dressage

World Championships
Bronze medal – third place	2002 Jerez	Team dressage

European Championships
Silver medal – second place	2003 Hickstead	Team dressage
Bronze medal – third place	2005 Hagen	Team dressage

Ignacio Rambla (born 2 January 1964) is a Spanish equestrian and Olympic medalist. He was born in Jerez de la Frontera. He won a silver medal in dressage at the 2004 Summer Olympics in Athens.
