= Juan Antonio Jiménez =

Spanish equestrian (born 1959)

Personal information
- Full name: Juan Antonio Jiménez Cobo
- Born: 11 May 1959 (age 67) Castro del Río, Spain
- Height: 178 cm (5 ft 10 in)

Sport
- Sport: Equestrian
Medal record
Equestrian
Representing Spain
Olympic Games
Silver medal – second place	2004 Athens	Team dressage
World Championships
Bronze medal – third place	2002 Jerez	Team dressage
European Championships
Silver medal – second place	2003 Hickstead	Team dressage
Bronze medal – third place	2005 Hagen	Team dressage

Juan Antonio Jiménez Cobo (Note: In this Spanish name, the first or paternal surname is Jiménez and the second or maternal family name is Cobo.) (born 11 May 1959) is a Spanish equestrian and Olympic medalist. He was born in Castro del Río. He won a silver medal in dressage at the 2004 Summer Olympics in Athens. At 65, he was the oldest athlete to compete in the 2024 Summer Olympics in Paris.
