= Emile Faurie =

British equestrian (born 1963)

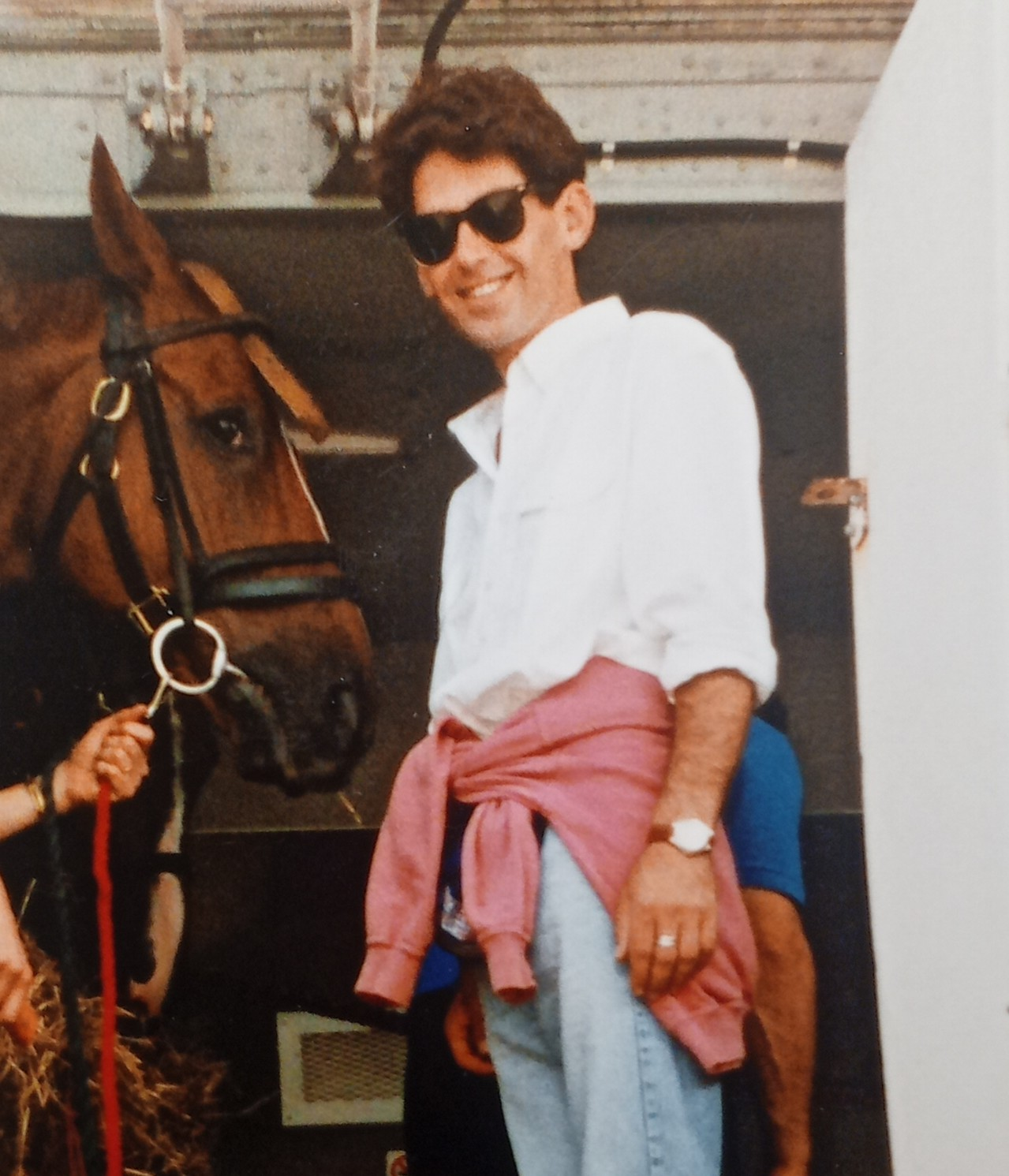
- Faurie stands in an aeroplane prior to travelling to the 1992 Summer Olympics

Personal information
- Nationality: British
- Born: 15 October 1963 (age 62) Johannesburg, South Africa

Sport
- Sport: Equestrian
Medal record
Equestrian
Representing Great Britain
World Championships
| Bronze medal – third place | 2018 Tryon | Team dressage |
European Championships
| Gold medal – first place | 2011 Rotterdam | Team dressage |
| Silver medal – second place | 1993 Lipica | Team dressage |
| Bronze medal – third place | 1993 Lipica | Special dressage |
| Bronze medal – third place | 2003 Hickstead | Team dressage |

Emile Faurie (born 15 October 1963) is a British equestrian. He competed at the 1992 Summer Olympics and the 2000 Summer Olympics.
