= Gonnelien Rothenberger =

Dutch equestrian (born 1968)

Medal record

Equestrian

Representing Netherlands

Olympic Games
Silver medal – second place	1996 Atlanta	Team dressage

World Championships
Silver medal – second place	1998 Rome	Team dressage

European Championships
Silver medal – second place	1997 Verden	Team dressage
Silver medal – second place	2001 Verden	Team dressage
Bronze medal – third place	1993 Lipica	Team dressage

Gonnelien Rothenberger (born 5 June 1968 in Weert, Limburg) is an equestrian from the Netherlands, who was born as Gonneke Antoinette Arnolda Johanna Adriana Robertine Gordijn. She is married to German equestrian Sven Rothenberger, with whom she won the silver medal in the Team Dressage Event at the 1996 Summer Olympics in Atlanta, Georgia for Holland, alongside Anky van Grunsven and Tineke Bartels. In the Individual Competition she finished in sixteenth position.

Her son Sönke Rothenberger is also an Olympic equestrian.
