= Coby van Baalen =

Dutch equestrian (born 1957)

Personal information
- Born: 6 April 1957 (age 69) Werkhoven, Utrecht, Netherlands

Sport
- Sport: Equestrian
- Event: Dressage
Medal record
Equestrian
Representing the Netherlands
Olympic Games
Silver medal – second place	2000 Sydney	Team dressage
World Championships
Silver medal – second place	1998 Rome	Team dressage
European Championships
Silver medal – second place	1999 Arnhem	Team dressage

Jacoba ("Coby") Maria Jozina van Baalen-Dorresteijn (born 6 April 1957 in Werkhoven, Utrecht) is an equestrian from the Netherlands, who won the silver medal in the Team Dressage event at the 2000 Summer Olympics in Sydney, Australia. She did so alongside Anky van Grunsven, Ellen Bontje, and Arjen Teeuwissen. In the Individual Competition Van Baalen finished in fifth position. Her daughter Marlies van Baalen is also an Olympic equestrian. Van Baalen competed in the Olympics with a KWPN stallion called Ferro, also known as Olympic Ferro.
