= Sjef Janssen =

Dutch dressage trainer

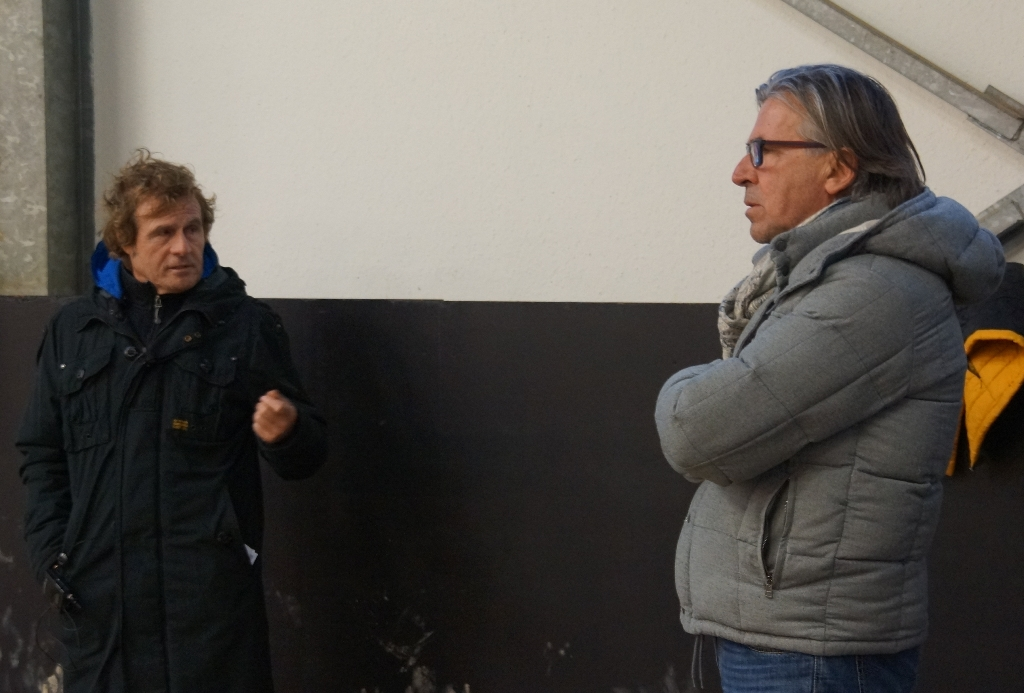
- Sjef Janssen (left)

Personal information
- Born: January 15, 1950 (age 76)
Medal record
Equestrian
Representing the Netherlands
European Championships
Bronze medal – third place	1991 Donaueschingen	Team dressage

Sjef Janssen (born January 15, 1950) is the Dutch national Olympic team dressage coach and spouse of Anky van Grunsven. He won a bronze medal in team dressage at the 1991 European Dressage Championships in Donaueschingen, Germany.
