= Mistral Højris =

Dressage horse

- Breed: Danish Warmblood
- Sire: Mitchellino
- Grandsire: Michelangelo
- Dam: Virginia
- Maternal grandsire: Ibsen
- Sex: Gelding
- Foaled: April 4, 1995
- Colour: Chestnut
- Owner: Dr Wilfried Bechtolsheimer, Mrs Ursula Bechtolsheimer and Laura Bechtolsheimer

Mistral Højris (born 1995) is a Danish-bred chestnut gelding ridden by the British equestrian Laura Bechtolsheimer in the sport of dressage. Mistral Højris, affectionately known as "Alf", and Bechtolsheimer were selected to represent Great Britain in both the 2008 Beijing Olympics where they finished 6th, as well as the 2012 London Olympics where they gained Team Gold and Individual Bronze.

He was retired in 2013.
