= Jan Brink =

Swedish equestrian

Medal record

Equestrian

Representing Sweden

European Championships
Silver medal – second place	2003 Hickstead	Individual dressage
Bronze medal – third place	1997 Verden	Team dressage
Bronze medal – third place	2005 Hagen	Individual dressage
Bronze medal – third place	2005 Hagen	Team dressage
Bronze medal – third place	2007 La Mandria	Team dressage

Jan Brink (born 1960) is a Swedish equestrian. He was born in Hörby. He competed at the 2008 Summer Olympics in Beijing, where he placed fourth in team dressage. He also competed at the 2000 and 2004 Summer Olympics.

Jan Brink is a seven-time Swedish dressage champion who rides the number one horse Björsell's Briar, winner of the Aachen Championships in 2005, and Bronze medallist at the 2005 European Dressage Championships.
