= Sven Rothenberger =

Dutch equestrian

Medal record

Equestrian

Representing Netherlands

Olympic Games
Silver medal – second place	1996 Atlanta	Team dressage
Bronze medal – third place	1996 Atlanta	Individual dressage

World Championships
Silver medal – second place	1994 The Hague	Team dressage
Bronze medal – third place	1994 The Hague	Special dressage

European Championships
Silver medal – second place	1995 Mondorf	Team dressage
Silver medal – second place	1997 Verden	Team dressage
Silver medal – second place	2005 Hagen	Team dressage
Bronze medal – third place	1995 Mondorf	Individual dressage

Representing Germany

World Championships
Gold medal – first place	1990 Stockholm	Team dressage

European Championships
Gold medal – first place	1991 Donaueschingen	Team dressage
Gold medal – first place	1991 Donaueschingen	Freestyle dressage
Gold medal – first place	1993 Lipica	Team dressage
Silver medal – second place	1993 Lipica	Freestyle dressage

Sven Günther Rothenberger (born 1 June 1966 in Frankfurt am Main) is an equestrian from Germany, who competed for the Netherlands after his marriage with Dutch equestrian Gonnelien Gordijn.

Sven is the father of Sonke Rothenberger, who won team gold at the 2016 Rio de Janeiro Olympics.
