= Ellen Bontje =

Dutch equestrian (born 1958)

Personal information
- Full name: Petronella Theodora Maria Bontje
- Born: 11 June 1958 (age 68) Hilversum, North Holland
Medal record
Equestrian
Representing the Netherlands
Olympic Games
Silver medal – second place	1992 Barcelona	Team dressage
Silver medal – second place	2000 Sydney	Team dressage
World Championships
Silver medal – second place	1994 The Hague	Team dressage
Silver medal – second place	1998 Rome	Team dressage
European Championships
Silver medal – second place	1995 Mondorf	Team dressage
Silver medal – second place	1997 Verden	Team dressage
Silver medal – second place	1999 Arnhem	Team dressage
Silver medal – second place	2001 Verden	Team dressage
Bronze medal – third place	1991 Donaueschingen	Team dressage

Petronella Theodora Maria "Ellen" Bontje (born 11 June 1958 in Hilversum, North Holland) is an equestrian from The Netherlands, who won the silver medal in the Team Dressage Event at the 2000 Olympic Games in Sydney, Australia. She did so alongside Anky van Grunsven, Coby van Baalen, and Arjen Teeuwissen. In the individual competition Bontje finished in sixth position.

Eight years earlier, at the 1992 Olympic Games in Barcelona, Spain, Bontje was also a member of the Dutch team that won the silver medal in the Team Dressage Competition. She competed in three Summer Games for her native country, starting at the 1988 Olympics in Seoul, South Korea.

She has won eight silver medals and one bronze medal in team dressage at various championships.
