= Heike Kemmer =

German equestrian

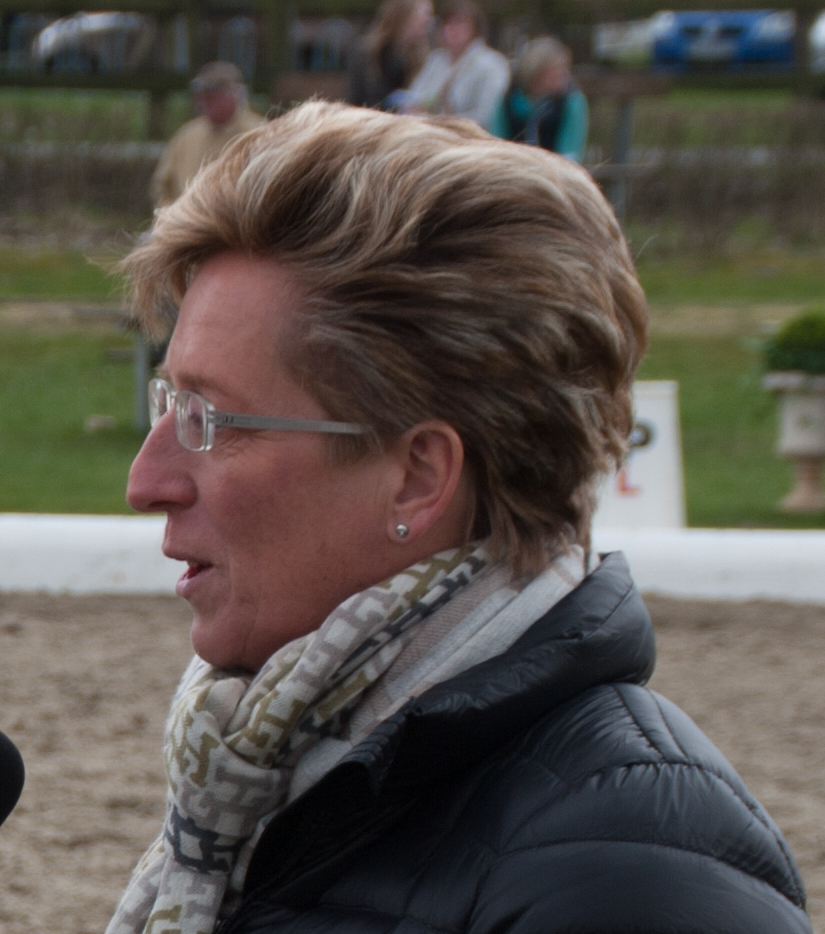
- Kemmer during an interview in 2013

Medal record

Representing Germany

Equestrian

Olympic Games
Gold medal – first place	2004 Athens	Team dressage
Gold medal – first place	2008 Beijing	Team dressage
Bronze medal – third place	2008 Beijing	Individual dressage

World Championships
Gold medal – first place	2006 Aachen	Team dressage

European Championships
Gold medal – first place	2001 Verden	Team dressage
Gold medal – first place	2003 Hickstead	Team dressage
Gold medal – first place	2005 Hagen	Team dressage

Heike Kemmer (born 24 April 1962 in East Berlin, East Germany) is a German equestrian who competes in the sport of dressage. She won team gold medals at the 2004 and 2008 Summer Olympics, as well as individual bronze in 2008. She also won medals at the German Dressage Championships and European Dressage Championships, as well as assisting the German team to gold at the 2006 World Equestrian Games. Kemmer retired Bonaparte 67, upon whom she had won most of her international medals, in 2011.

== Personal life ==
Kemmer was the daughter of Joachim Kemmer, a noted horse breeder who established Amselhof Walle, the breeding stable for Hanoverian horses now run by Heike. In the 1990s, Heike became the farm manager, and moved the focus of the stables from show jumping to dressage.

== Competitive career ==
Kemmer attended her first Olympics in 2000, as an alternate to the German team, but did not participate in the Games. In 2004, she rode in the Olympics for the first time, placing 26th individually. She also rode as part of the gold medal-winning German team, but as the lowest-scoring member, her score was not used to determine the team's standing. At the 2008 Summer Olympics, her performance improved significantly, and she took home an individual bronze medal and was a scoring member of the gold medal-winning German team. She rode Bonaparte 67 at both the 2004 and 2008 Olympic Games. In 2006, Kemmer and Bonaparte also assisted the German team to a gold medal at the World Equestrian Games.

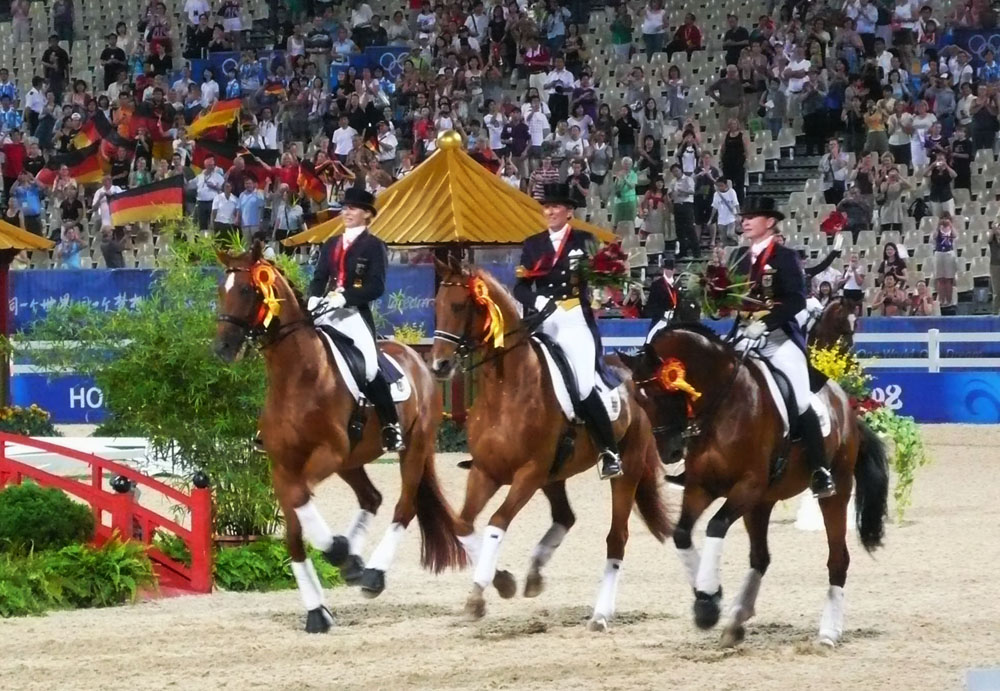
Kemmer (center) with the gold medal-winning German dressage team in 2008

Kemmer's international career stretches back to a silver medal win at the 1984 German Dressage Championships, followed by a lengthy break to focus on her schooling and profession as a business economist. She returned to the international competition ring in 1998, riding Caesar, and then moved to riding Albano for the 1999 season. Riding Albano, she again rose to prominence with another silver medal win at the 2000 German Dressage Championships. This was followed by a bronze at the same competition in 2001 and gold in 2005 and 2006. She also helped the Germans to team gold at the European Dressage Championships in 2001, 2003 and 2005, and was a reserve team member in 2007. Following their success at the 2008 Olympics, Kemmer and Bonaparte briefly had a successful return to the competition ring in early 2009. However, injuries later in the year prevented a return to the German team for the 2009 European Championships, and a diagnosis of Lyme disease for Bonaparte removed the possibility of competition in the 2010 competition. In 2011, Kemmer retired Bonaparte at the 2011 CDN Hanover show.

In 2002, Kemmer and Bonaparte 67 were awarded the Otto Lorke Prize, which is given to the "most talented upcoming Grand Prix combination of the year in Germany", and in 2004 the horse was named Hanoverian of the Year. By 2013, she was riding two new horses at the international level: Rock My Soul at Intermediare I level and Quantico in Grand Prix competitions.

== Notable horses ==
- Albano 7 - 1987 Bay Oldenburg Gelding (Argentinus x Grundstein I)
  - 2001 European Championships - Team Gold Medal, Individual Ninth Place
  - 2003 FEI World Cup Final - Silver Medal
- Bonaparte 67 - 1993 Chestnut Hanoverian Gelding (Bon Bonaparte x Consul)
  - 2003 European Championships - Individual Fourth Place
  - 2004 FEI World Cup Final - Fourth Place
  - 2004 Athens Olympics - Team Gold Medal, Individual 26th Place
  - 2005 European Championships - Team Gold Medal, Individual 25th Place
  - 2006 World Equestrian Games - Team Gold Medal, Individual Fifth Place, Individual Fifth Place Freestyle
  - 2008 Beijing Olympics - Team Gold Medal, Individual Fourth Place
