= Klaus Balkenhol =

German equestrian (born 1939)

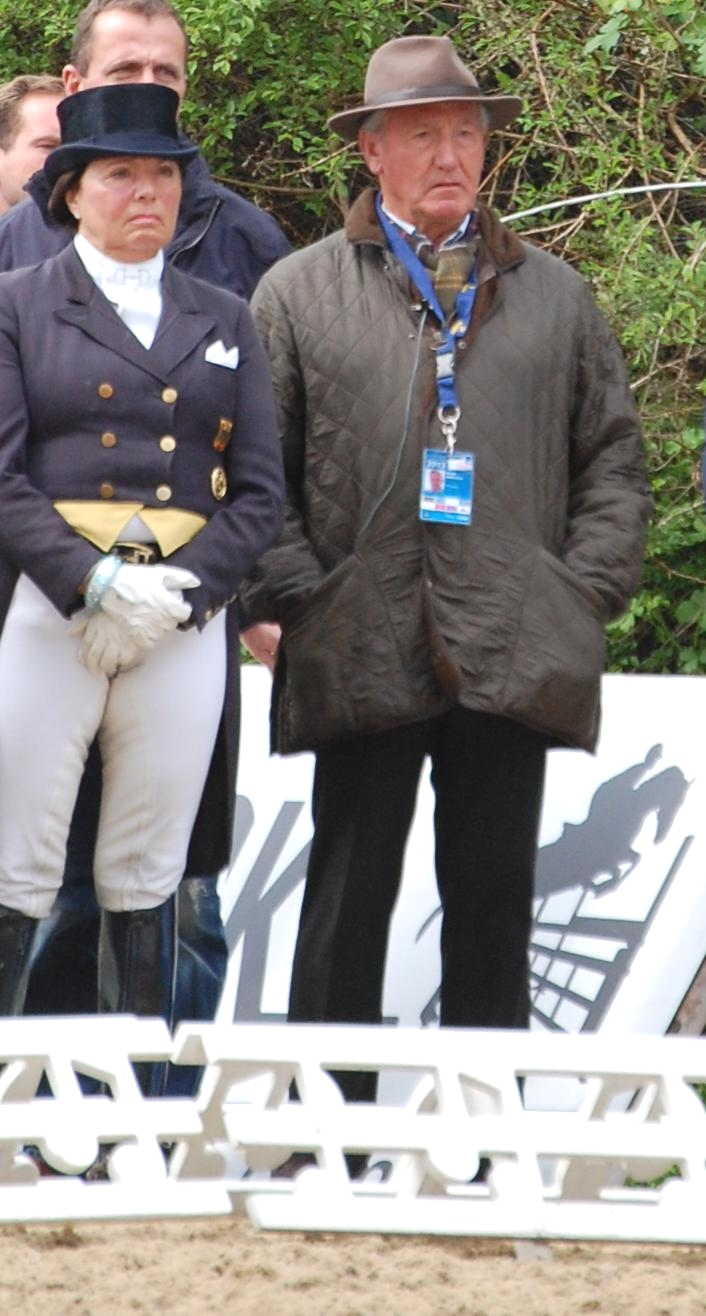

Medal record

Equestrian

Representing Germany

Olympic Games
Gold medal – first place	1992 Barcelona	Team dressage
Gold medal – first place	1996 Atlanta	Team dressage
Bronze medal – third place	1992 Barcelona	Individual dressage

World Championships
Gold medal – first place	1994 The Hague	Team dressage
Silver medal – second place	1994 The Hague	Freestyle dressage

European Championships
Gold medal – first place	1991 Donaueschingen	Team dressage
Gold medal – first place	1993 Lipica	Team dressage
Gold medal – first place	1995 Mondorf	Team dressage
Silver medal – second place	1991 Donaueschingen	Spécial dressage

Klaus Balkenhol (born 6 December 1939 in Velen) is a German equestrian and Olympic champion. He won a gold medal in team dressage at the 1992 Summer Olympics in Barcelona with the team from Germany. Balkenhol is the author of several dressage books. He is an avid member of Xenophen, and like Philippe Karl petitions against the use of rollkur. Balkenhol's earlier riding career consisted of being a mounted policeman. He was also the coach of the U.S. Olympic team. He also received a gold medal with the German team in 1996. At present Balkenhol is the trainer of Olympic equestrian Laura Bechtolsheimer.

== Bibliography ==
- Collins, David (2006) [2006]. "Klaus Balkenhol". Dressage Masters. Guilford, Connecticut: The Lyons Press. pp. 1–49. ISBN 978-159228-674-4.
