= Hagen am Teutoburger Wald =

- Municipality
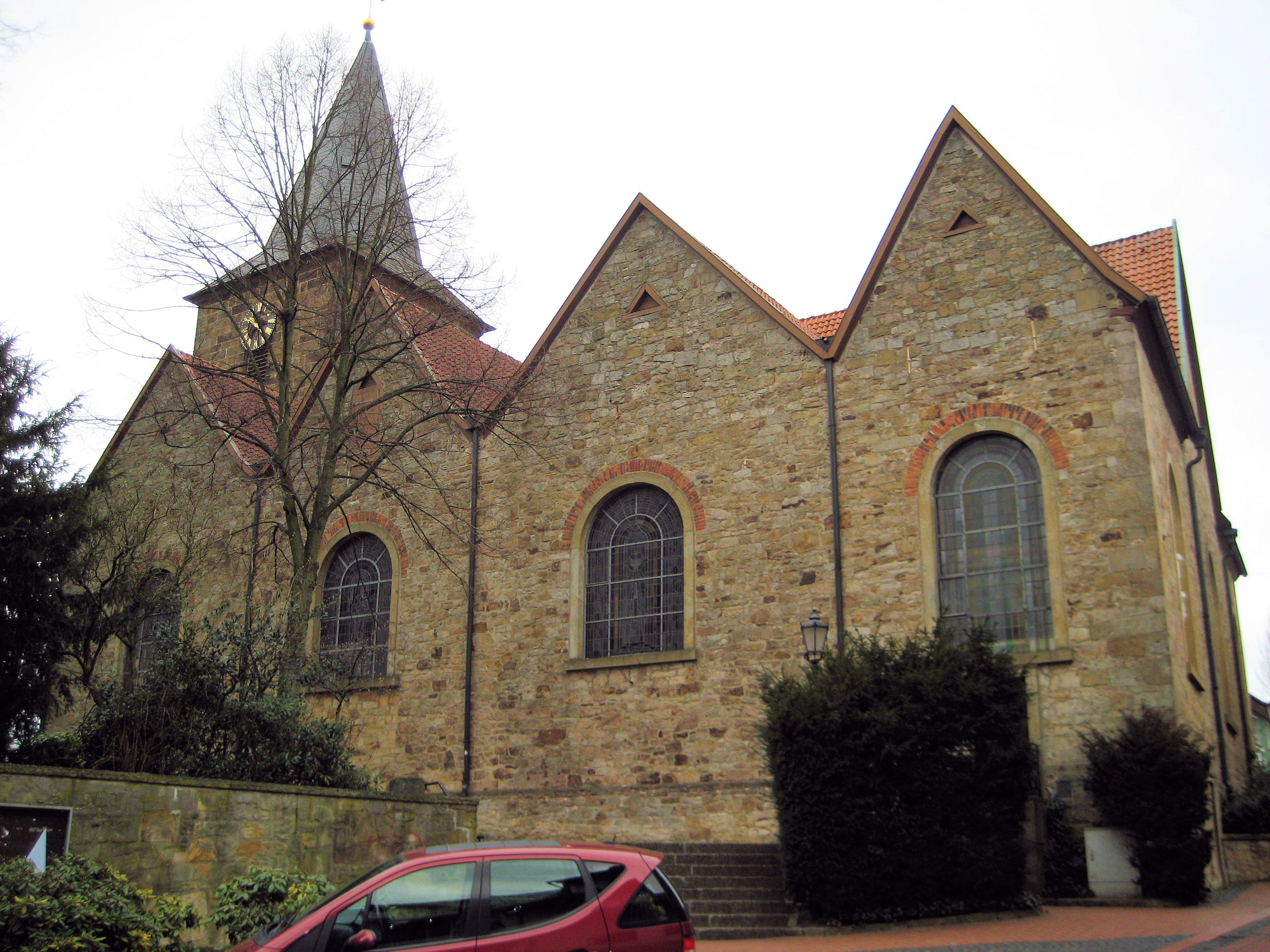
- Church of Saint Martin in secular use

- Coat of arms

- Location of Hagen am Teutoburger Wald within Osnabrück district
- Interactive map of Hagen am Teutoburger Wald
- Location within Germany Location within Lower Saxony
- Coordinates: 52°11′46″N 07°58′52″E
- Country: Germany
- State: Lower Saxony
- District: Osnabrück
- Subdivisions: 6 Ortsteile

Government
  - Mayor (2021–26): Christine Möller (CDU)

Area
  - Total: 34.49 km^{2} (13.32 sq mi)
- Elevation: 110 m (360 ft)

Population (2025-12-31)
  - Total: 13,208
  - Density: 383.0/km^{2} (991.8/sq mi)
- Time zone: UTC+01:00 (CET)
  - Summer (DST): UTC+02:00 (CEST)
- Postal codes: 49170
- Dialling codes: 05401, 05405
- Vehicle registration: OS, BSB, MEL, WTL
- Website: www.hagen-atw.de

Hagen am Teutoburger Wald (German pronunciation: [ˈhaːɡn̩ ʔam ˈtɔʏtoˌbʊʁɡɐ ˈvalt], lit. 'Hagen on the Teutoburg Forest') is a municipality in the district of Osnabrück, in Lower Saxony, Germany. It is situated in the Teutoburg Forest, approx. 10 km southwest of Osnabrück.
