= Harry Boldt =

German equestrian

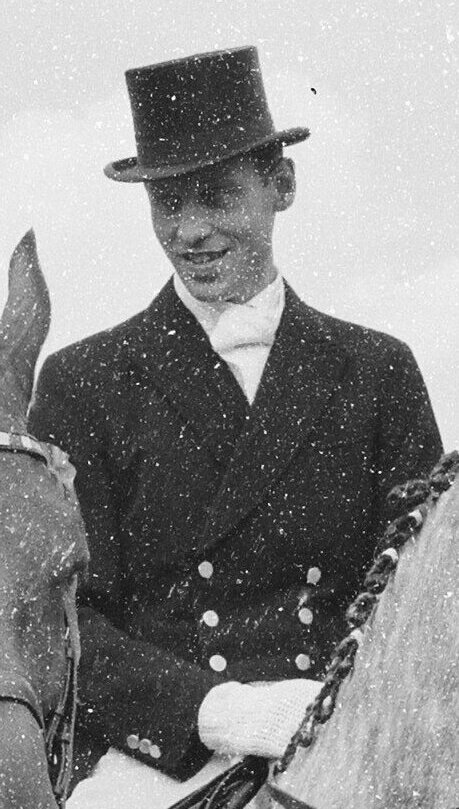
- Harry Boldt (1962)

Personal information
- Nationality: German
- Born: 23 February 1930 (age 96) Insterburg, East Prussia, Weimar Republic

Sport
- Sport: Equestrian
Medal record
Equestrian
Representing Germany
Olympic Games
Gold medal – first place	1964 Tokyo	Team dressage
Silver medal – second place	1964 Tokyo	Individual dressage
Representing West Germany
Olympic Games
Gold medal – first place	1976 Montreal	Team dressage
Silver medal – second place	1976 Montreal	Individual dressage
World Championships
Gold medal – first place	1966 Bern	Team dressage
Gold medal – first place	1978 Goodwood	Team dressage
Silver medal – second place	1966 Bern	Individual dressage
Silver medal – second place	1970 Aachen	Team dressage
European Championships
Gold medal – first place	1965 Copenhagen	Team dressage
Gold medal – first place	1967 Aachen	Team dressage
Gold medal – first place	1975 Kiev	Team dressage
Gold medal – first place	1977 St. Gallen	Team dressage
Gold medal – first place	1979 Aarhus	Team dressage
Silver medal – second place	1963 Copenhagen	Individual dressage
Silver medal – second place	1965 Copenhagen	Individual dressage
Silver medal – second place	1975 Kiev	Individual dressage
Silver medal – second place	1977 St. Gallen	Individual dressage
Bronze medal – third place	1967 Aachen	Individual dressage
Bronze medal – third place	1979 Aarhus	Individual dressage

Harry Boldt (born 23 February 1930) is a German equestrian and Olympic champion. He was born in Insterburg, East Prussia, Germany. He won a gold medal in the team dressage at the 1964 Summer Olympics in Tokyo, and another at the 1976 Summer Olympics in Montreal.
