= FEI World Equestrian Games =

Major international championships for equestrianism

- Status: active
- Genre: sports event
- Frequency: every 4th year
- Location: various
- Years active: Since 1990
- Inaugurated: 1990
- Organiser: FEI

The FEI World Equestrian Games are the major international championships for equestrianism, and are administered by the Fédération Équestre Internationale (FEI). The games have been held every four years, halfway between sets of consecutive Summer Olympic Games, since 1990. Prior to that year, all ten of the FEI's individual disciplines held separate championships, usually in separate countries. The modern WEG runs over two weeks and, like the Olympics, the location rotates to different parts of the world. Riders and horses competing at WEG go through a rigorous selection process, and each participating country sends teams that have distinguished themselves through competition as the nation's best in each respective discipline. At the 2010 Games, 57 countries were represented by 800 people and their horses.

The WEG gradually expanded to include eight of the FEI's ten disciplines: combined driving, dressage, endurance riding, eventing, paraequestrianism, reining, show jumping, and vaulting. The FEI's two remaining regional disciplines, horseball and tent pegging, still conduct independent championships.

The 2010 FEI World Equestrian Games in Lexington, Kentucky marked a series of firsts in WEG history: the first time WEG were held outside Europe; the first time that championships for eight FEI disciplines were held at one location (the Kentucky Horse Park); and the first time WEG had a title sponsor (in this case the animal health and nutrition group corporation Alltech, headquartered in the nearby city of Nicholasville). Permanent upgrades added to the Kentucky Horse Park leading up to the event included the completion of a 6,000 seat, climate-controlled indoor arena and completion of a 7,500 seat outdoor stadium.

The Tryon International Equestrian Center, near Mill Spring, North Carolina, was the location of the 2018 FEI World Equestrian Games.

Tryon 2018 was the last World Equestrian Games as the WEG format was discontinued during the FEI General Assembly meeting on 20 November 2018.

"We need to think carefully about the future of WEG and have the courage to look at the future of our World Championships and ask if WEG is still fit for purpose. ... So the FEI Board decided to open the bidding process to separate World Championships with a focus on combined bids. Is this the end of World Equestrian Games? Not necessarily as this procedure will still allow bidders to apply for all Championships in one event. ... The Secretary General confirmed that bids would be invited for individual discipline World Championships in 2022 in place of the WEG format."

— FEI General Assembly and Extraordinary General Assembly - Minutes

== Locations ==
Number	Year	Host	Events
1	1990	Stockholm, Sweden	13
2	1994	The Hague, Netherlands	14
3	1998	Rome, Italy	11
4	2002	Jerez de la Frontera, Spain	15
5	2006	Aachen, Germany	16
6	2010	Lexington, USA	27
7	2014	Normandy, France	28
8	2018	Tryon, USA	29
9	2022	Herning, Denmark: Jumping, Dressage, Para Dressage, Eventing, Driving, Vaulting; Rome, Italy: Eventing, Driving	21
10	2026	Aachen, Germany: Jumping, Dressage, Para Dressage, Eventing, Driving, Vaulting	25

== Medal count ==
The current historical medal count (as of 2026) of the FEI World Championships is as follows:

Rank	Nation	Gold	Silver	Bronze	Total
1	Germany^{1}	51	33	46	130
2	Great Britain	29	30	22	81
3	Netherlands	28	22	24	74
4	United States	22	20	23	65
5	France	15	22	7	44
6	Denmark	8	14	9	31
7	Belgium	8	11	5	24
8	Italy	5	7	8	20
9	Switzerland	5	7	6	18
10	Sweden	5	2	7	14
11	New Zealand	5	1	2	8
12	Australia	4	2	6	12
13	Spain	3	2	2	7
14	United Arab Emirates	3	1	1	5
15	Austria	1	7	9	17
16	Canada	1	4	4	9
17	Brazil	1	2	2	5
17	Ireland	1	2	2	5
19	Latvia	1	2	1	4
20	Finland	0	1	2	3
20	Hungary	0	1	2	3
22	Singapore	0	1	1	2
23	Saudi Arabia	0	1	0	1
23	Soviet Union ^{2}	0	1	0	1
25	Japan	0	0	1	1
25	Norway	0	0	1	1
25	Portugal	0	0	1	1
25	Qatar	0	0	1	1
25	Slovakia	0	0	1	1
Totals (29 entries)		196	196	196	588

Notes

Medal count is sorted by total gold medals, then total silver medals, then total bronze medals, then alphabetically. The table doesn't count events before 1990.

- ^1 The reunified Federal Republic of Germany (1990 onwards) is regarded by the FEI as being the same country as pre-reunification West Germany (1948–1990), as part of an unbroken line going back to Germany's affiliation to the FEI in 1927 during its Weimar Republic (1919–1933). If Germany and West Germany were considered to be two separate countries, their medal tallies would be: Germany 26 gold, 14 silver, and 20 bronze; West Germany 4 gold, 4 silver, and 4 bronze.
- ^2 The Soviet Union competed only in the 1990 Games, as it collapsed prior to the 1994 Games

== Incidents ==
- 2014: Qalao des Mers, ridden by Maxime Livio (FRA) was found to have a positive finding for hydroxyethylpromazine sulfoxide, a banned substance. Livio was disqualified, which cost the French team their place in the Rio 2016 Olympics.
- 2018: Horse Barack Obama, ridden by Jenny Champion (NZL) was euthanized after experiencing kidney problems during the endurance competition.
- 2018: Box Qutie, ridden by Anna Freskgård (SWE) was euthanized after injury during the cross country portion of the event.

== Results ==
- Eventing World Championship
- Show Jumping World Championships
- Dressage World Championship

== See also ==
- Equestrian at the Summer Olympics
- List of World Champions in Driving (horse)
