= Individual freestyle dressage at the 2006 World Equestrian Games =

eleThe individual freestyle dressage competition at the 2006 FEI World Equestrian Games was held between August 22 and August 26, 2006.

== Medalists ==
Gold	Silver	Bronze
(Netherlands) Anky van Grunsven (Keltec Salinero)	(Denmark) Andreas Helgstrand (Blue Hors Matiné)	(Germany) Isabell Werth (Satchmo)

== Complete results ==
Rider and horse were eliminated from further competition

Rider and horse did not qualify for the next round

=== Round 1 ===
The first round of the individual freestyle dressage competition was held on August 22 and August 23, 2006.

	Rider	Horse	Judges					Total percentage
	Rider	Horse	E	H	C	M	B	Total percentage
	Rider	Horse	(Netherlands)	(United States)	(United Kingdom)	(France)	(Germany)	Total percentage
1	(Denmark) Andreas Helgstrand	Blue Hors Matiné	78.125	75.833	74.375	77.292	76.042	76.333
2	(Germany) Heike Kemmer	Bonaparte	76.458	75.000	75.625	74.792	77.083	75.792
3	(Germany) Isabell Werth	Satchmo	76.042	76.667	73.125	73.542	75.625	75.000
3	(Netherlands) Anky van Grunsven	Keltec Salinero	76.042	72.708	75.417	75.833	75.000	75.000
5	(Germany) Nadine Capellmann	Elvis Va	69.792	74.792	73.542	71.667	74.375	72.833
6	(United States) Steffen Peters	Floriano	71.250	72.917	72.708	72.917	73.750	72.708
7	(Sweden) Jan Brink	Björsells Briar 899	70.625	73.125	72.292	71.875	72.917	72.167
8	(Netherlands) Imke Schellekens-Bartels	Sunrise	70.833	68.542	73.542	71.875	72.917	71.542
9	(United States) Debbie McDonald^{1}	Brentina	69.375	72.917	72.083	72.083	70.625	71.417
10	(Netherlands) Edward Gal	Group 4 Securicor Lingh	70.625	71.042	71.458	71.458	72.292	71.375
11	(France) Karen Tebar	Falada M	69.792	72.083	70.833	70.833	70.625	70.833
12	(Finland) Kyra Kyrklund	Max	69.792	72.292	70.417	69.375	71.250	70.625
13	(United Kingdom) Emma Hindle	Lancet	68.542	71.250	71.250	69.583	71.667	70.458
14	(Sweden) Tinne Vilhelmson	Solos Carex	70.208	71.667	71.250	68.125	70.417	70.333
15	(Australia) Kristy Oatley	Quando-Quando	68.750	71.250	70.417	70.417	69.583	70.083
16	(Mexico) Bernadette Pujals	Vincent	69.583	71.458	71.042	68.542	69.375	70.000
17	(United States) Guenter Seidel	Aragon	69.583	70.417	69.792	68.958	70.208	69.792
18	(Germany) Hubertus Schmidt	Wansuela Suerte	68.750	67.500	71.458	68.750	69.583	69.208
19	(Austria) Victoria Max-Theurer	Falcao	67.500	70.625	70.000	67.500	70.208	69.167
20	(Switzerland) Silvia Iklé	Salieri CH	68.750	68.125	68.750	70.833	67.292	68.750
21	(Netherlands) Laurens van Lieren	Hexagon's Ollright	68.333	67.500	68.542	68.125	70.000	68.500
22	(Switzerland) Christian Pläge	Regent	67.500	69.375	67.083	69.792	68.333	68.417
23	(United Kingdom) Sandy Phillips	Lara	66.667	68.333	67.708	71.250	67.500	68.292
24	(Russia) Elena Kalinina	Royal Black Label	67.083	67.917	67.083	68.750	67.917	67.750
25	(United Kingdom) Wayne Channon	Lorenzo CH	66.458	65.833	68.542	68.333	68.542	67.542
26	(United Kingdom) Laura Bechtolsheimer	Douglas Dorsey	67.292	68.542	67.917	66.458	66.667	67.375
27	(France) Dominique d'Esmé	Roi de Coeur GFD	66.250	65.833	68.958	68.333	66.458	67.167
28	(Belgium) Jeroen Devroe	Paganini	67.083	65.833	68.333	66.667	66.250	66.833
29	(Australia) Matthew Dowsley	Cinderella	65.625	66.042	68.750	67.292	65.625	66.667
29	(Spain) Rafael Soto	Invasor	65.208	65.000	66.250	69.583	67.292	66.667
31	(Switzerland) Marie-Line Wettstein	Le Primeur	66.042	65.417	67.083	66.667	67.500	66.542
31	(Russia) Alexandra Korelova	Balagur	66.250	67.292	66.042	67.500	65.625	66.542
33	(Switzerland) Marcela Krinke-Susmelj	Corinth	67.083	67.292	65.625	65.625	66.667	66.458
33	(Denmark) Anders Dahl	Afrikka	65.417	66.250	67.083	68.125	65.417	66.458
35	(Canada) Evi Strasser	Quantum Tyme	66.042	64.375	67.083	68.333	66.042	66.375
36	(Sweden) Louise Nathorst	Guinness	65.833	66.458	66.458	66.458	66.042	66.250
37	(Spain) Ignacio Rambla	Distinguido 2	66.250	66.042	65.625	67.083	65.625	66.125
37	(France) Hubert Perring	Diabolo St. Maurice	65.208	65.208	66.042	68.125	66.042	66.125
39	(Denmark) Nathalie Zu Sayn-Wittgenstein	Digby	65.625	68.542	67.083	63.125	66.042	66.083
40	(Spain) Juan Antonio Jimenez	Guizo	65.417	64.583	63.958	66.667	64.167	64.958
41	(Poland) Katarzyna Milczarek	Lecantos	64.375	64.375	65.000	67.083	63.333	64.833
42	(Italy) Claudia Montanari	Don Vittorio	64.792	64.792	67.500	62.708	63.750	64.708
43	(Poland) Michal Rapcewicz	Randon	64.375	64.792	63.958	64.792	64.583	64.500
44	(Spain) José Ignacio López Porras	Nevado Santa Clara	62.917	63.125	64.583	65.833	65.833	64.458
45	(Canada) Ashley Holzer	Gambol	62.708	65.417	65.000	64.792	63.542	64.292
46	(United States) Leslie Morse	Tip Top 962	66.458	63.750	62.708	63.958	64.375	64.250
47	(Republic of Ireland) Anna Merveldt	Lafitte	63.750	61.667	65.625	64.375	63.958	63.875
48	(Italy) Anna Paprocka-Campanella	Andretti H	63.333	63.125	64.583	62.917	64.583	63.708
49	(Colombia) Cesar Parra	Galant du Serein	63.958	63.958	63.333	64.167	62.083	63.500
50	(France) Constance Menard	Lianca	63.542	61.250	65.208	65.417	61.875	63.458
51	(Austria) Evelyn Haim-Swarovski	Chopin	62.500	61.667	63.125	63.542	63.125	62.792
51	(Portugal) Daniel Pinto	Galopin de la Font	60.417	60.833	61.667	66.875	64.167	62.792
53	(Belarus) Iryna Lis	Problesk	60.625	62.292	62.708	64.792	62.917	62.667
54	(Austria) Nina Stadlinger	Egalité	61.458	61.250	62.917	64.375	62.500	62.500
54	(Australia) Rachael Sanna	Chatham Park Jac	64.792	61.458	61.875	61.667	62.708	62.500
54	(Denmark) Lone Jørgensen	Hardthof's Ludewig G	62.083	61.042	63.958	61.667	63.750	62.500
57	(Belgium) Mieke Lunskens	Jade	61.875	61.042	61.250	64.167	62.292	62.125
58	(Poland) Zaneta Skowronska	Romeo	61.667	61.042	62.083	63.750	60.000	61.708
59	(Lithuania) Julija Ona Vysniauskas	Syntax	60.625	59.583	62.500	62.708	59.167	60.917
59	(Portugal) Andre Parada	Landim	60.417	58.750	61.250	64.167	60.000	60.917
61	(Italy) Eva Rosenthal	L'Etoile 009	60.417	60.833	59.167	62.292	60.417	60.625
62	(Ukraine) Yuriy Kovshov	Areal	60.208	59.375	60.208	62.917	60.000	60.542
63	(Sweden) Kristian von Krusenstierna	Wilson	61.042	58.333	59.792	60.000	62.917	60.417
64	(Belgium) Carl Cuypers	Hofgut Liederbach's Barclay	62.500	57.708	59.583	60.833	61.250	60.375
65	(Netherlands Antilles) Susan de Klein	Special	61.250	60.208	60.833	60.208	58.333	60.167
66	(Austria) Caroline Kottas-Heldenberg	Exupery	59.792	56.667	60.000	63.958	59.792	60.042
67	(Belarus) Svetlana Yevshchik	Dombai	60.000	59.583	58.958	62.292	58.333	59.833
68	(Slovenia) Igor Maver	085 Favory Canissa XXII	60.625	58.333	60.417	61.458	57.917	59.750
69	(Belgium) Francoise Hologne-Joux	Born	60.208	57.708	62.292	58.958	59.375	59.708
70	(Antigua and Barbuda) Emily Ward	Vallon	59.167	59.375	58.958	61.458	59.167	59.625
71	(Republic of Ireland) Judy Reynolds	Rathbawn Valet	58.958	59.167	60.000	60.417	58.750	59.458
72	(Portugal) Nuno Vicente	Nostradamus Do Top	60.208	60.000	60.417	57.500	58.750	59.375
73	(Greece) Ioanna Georgopoulou	Dynastie	58.333	58.958	59.583	61.458	56.250	58.917
74	(Japan) Kuranojo Saito	Lotus	57.500	59.792	58.125	61.250	57.500	58.833
75	(Japan) Yuriko Miyoshi	Chevalier 66	58.333	57.917	57.083	62.292	56.875	58.500
76	(Ukraine) Inna Tzydrenkova	Odis	57.500	56.875	58.125	59.583	59.583	58.333
77	(South Africa) Natalie Hobday	Callaho Wenckstern	58.333	57.917	58.333	58.542	57.292	58.083
78	(Luxembourg) Joelle Kinnen	Petit Prince 9	56.875	57.292	59.792	56.042	58.333	57.667
79	(Hungary) Zsofia Dallos	Leonardo	57.292	57.917	55.625	61.458	55.208	57.500
80	(Japan) Toshihiko Kiso	Esko 10	57.292	55.625	55.417	60.417	54.375	56.625
81	(Hungary) Roberts Acs	Lagerfeld	57.500	57.083	54.792	58.125	55.000	56.500
82	(Poland) Jaroslaw Wierzchowski	Wieland	56.667	56.875	54.792	57.917	55.208	56.292
83	(Portugal) Miguel Duarte	Oxalis da Meia Lua	52.292	55.208	52.083	52.917	52.500	53.000
84	(Kazakhstan) Sergey Buikevich	Volan	Eliminated					
84	(Ukraine) Andriy Luk'Yanov	Gopak	Eliminated					
84	(Australia) Kelly Layne	Amoucheur	Eliminated					
85	(Japan) Hiroshi Hoketsu	Calambo	Did Not Start					
85	(Russia) Tatiana Miloserdova	Wat a Feeling	Did Not Start					
85	(Russia) Inessa Poturaeva	Zorro	Did Not Start					

- ^1 Debbie McDonald withdrew prior to the final due to a veterinary concern with her horse, Brentina.

=== Round 2 ===
The second round of the individual freestyle dressage competition was held on August 25, 2006. This round was also used as the final for the individual special competition.

	Rider	Horse	Judges					Total percentage
	Rider	Horse	E	H	C	M	B	Total percentage
	Rider	Horse	(United States)	(Australia)	(Poland)	(Germany)	(France)	Total percentage
1	(Germany) Isabell Werth	Satchmo	80.600	79.200	79.200	79.400	79.000	79.480
2	(Netherlands) Anky van Grunsven	Keltec Salinero	76.200	78.200	79.600	78.000	77.000	77.800
3	(Denmark) Andreas Helgstrand	Blue Hors Matiné	76.600	76.600	75.800	75.600	78.200	76.560
4	(United States) Steffen Peters	Floriano	76.600	75.600	73.600	76.600	73.600	75.200
5	(Germany) Nadine Capellmann	Elvis Va	72.800	75.000	74.800	75.200	76.000	74.760
6	(Switzerland) Silvia Iklé	Salieri CH	73.200	73.600	75.800	75.400	70.600	73.720
7	(Germany) Heike Kemmer	Bonaparte	70.800	73.400	73.200	73.800	74.800	73.200
8	(Sweden) Jan Brink	Björsells Briar 899	71.400	75.200	72.200	73.000	73.400	73.040
9	(Netherlands) Imke Schellekens-Bartels	Sunrise	73.800	71.600	73.200	73.200	73.200	73.000
10	(Mexico) Bernadette Pujals	Vincent	71.200	73.000	73.600	72.800	71.800	72.480
11	(Netherlands) Edward Gal	Group 4 Securicor Lingh	71.200	70.600	73.600	72.600	71.200	71.840
12	(Finland) Kyra Kyrklund	Max	72.600	72.400	72.800	71.200	69.600	71.720
13	(Germany) Hubertus Schmidt^{2}	Wansuela Suerte	72.800	70.800	69.600	72.400	69.600	71.040
14	(United States) Guenter Seidel	Aragon	72.000	70.400	69.200	71.200	70.000	70.560
15	(Netherlands) Laurens van Lieren^{2}	Hexagon's Ollright	68.400	70.200	69.600	72.000	71.200	20.280
16	(Switzerland) Christian Pläge	Regent	68.200	66.600	70.600	70.400	70.200	69.200
17	(United Kingdom) Emma Hindle	Lancet	70.600	69.600	70.000	68.800	66.600	69.120
18	(Australia) Kristy Oatley	Quando-Quando	69.800	69.400	68.400	67.800	69.400	68.960
19	(Spain) Rafael Soto	Invasor	69.200	68.600	68.600	68.200	69.600	68.840
20	(Sweden) Tinne Vilhelmson	Solos Carex	67.200	68.800	67.600	67.600	68.600	67.960
21	(United Kingdom) Laura Bechtolsheimer	Douglas Dorsey	67.800	67.600	67.200	66.800	68.600	67.600
22	(Belgium) Jeroen Devroe	Paganini	67.000	68.400	65.800	67.000	65.000	66.640
23	(Switzerland) Marie-Line Wettstein	Le Primeur	66.600	67.000	67.200	65.400	66.000	66.440
23	(United Kingdom) Wayne Channon	Lorenzo CH	65.400	65.600	67.000	66.600	67.600	66.440
25	(France) Karen Tebar	Falada M	66.400	66.600	64.800	64.600	67.200	65.920
26	(Russia) Elena Kalinina	Royal Black Label	65.000	64.600	68.400	65.800	64.200	65.600
27	(Russia) Alexandra Korelova	Balagur	64.600	66.200	64.200	66.200	65.200	65.280
27	(United Kingdom) Sandy Phillips	Lara	64.800	66.600	64.800	65.200	65.000	65.280
29	(Austria) Victoria Max-Theurer	Falcao	64.400	65.000	66.800	64.000	66.000	65.240
29	(Australia) Matthew Dowsley	Cinderella	64.600	65.800	64.600	64.400	66.800	65.240
31	(France) Dominique d'Esmé	Roi de Coeur GFD	62.000	64.000	63.000	62.800	66.600	63.680

- ^2 Because of a ruling that only three competitors from each nation may compete, both Hubertus Schmidt of Germany and Laurens van Lieren of the Netherlands were unable to compete in the final, allowing Christian Pläge of Switzerland and Emma Hindle of the United Kingdom to take their places.

=== Final ===
The final round of the individual freestyle dressage competition was held on August 26, 2006.

	Rider	Horse	Judges					Total percentage
	Rider	Horse	E	H	C	M	B	Total percentage
	Rider	Horse	(Australia)	(Netherlands)	(Germany)	(Poland)	(United Kingdom)	Total percentage
1	(Netherlands) Anky van Grunsven	Keltec Salinero	78.000; 91.000	78.500; 89.000	80.500; 92.000	83.500; 92.000	82.500; 94.000	86.100
2	(Denmark) Andreas Helgstrand	Blue Hors Matiné	73.000; 85.000	76.500; 87.000	80.500; 89.000	76.000; 84.000	79.000; 85.000	81.500
3	(Germany) Isabell Werth	Satchmo	72.500; 83.000	73.500; 82.000	79.000; 92.000	77.000; 89.000	75.500; 84.000	80.750
4	(Germany) Nadine Capellmann	Elvis Va	73.000; 85.000	74.000; 84.000	74.500; 87.000	75.500; 85.000	77.000; 84.000	79.900
5	(Germany) Heike Kemmer	Bonaparte	72.000; 81.000	76.500; 85.000	76.500; 88.000	71.500; 84.000	72.000; 82.000	78.850
6	(United States) Steffan Peters	Floriano	74.000; 84.000	73.500; 81.000	72.500; 84.000	76.000; 84.000	75.000; 82.000	78.600
7	(Finland) Kyra Kyrklund	Max	71.000; 76.000	72.000; 79.000	75.500; 86.000	75.000; 84.000	73.500; 81.000	77.300
8	(Netherlands) Imke Schellekens-Bartels	Sunrise	71.000; 82.000	71.500; 78.000	70.000; 82.000	76.500; 83.000	72.000; 78.000	76.400
9	(Sweden) Jan Brink	Björsells Briar 899	68.500; 80.000	71.500; 82.000	72.500; 84.000	71.000; 79.000	71.500; 78.000	75.800
10	(Mexico) Bernadette Pujals	Vincent	72.000; 79.000	70.500; 75.000	72.000; 84.000	72.000; 75.000	71.500; 79.000	75.000
11	(Switzerland) Silvia Iklé	Salieri CH	70.000; 80.000	71.000; 76.000	68.500; 81.000	71.500; 77.000	73.500; 79.000	74.750
11	(Netherlands) Edward Gal	Group 4 Securicor Lingh	68.500; 75.000	73.500; 80.000	72.000; 82.000	72.000; 75.000	71.500; 78.000	74.750
13	(United States) Guenter Seidel	Aragon	69.500; 80.000	67.500; 71.000	67.000; 80.000	68.500; 73.000	70.500; 78.000	72.500
14	(Switzerland) Christian Pläge	Regent	65.500; 71.000	68.500; 70.000	68.500; 76.000	71.000; 75.000	70.500; 75.000	71.100
15	(United Kingdom) Emma Hindle	Lancet	66.000; 70.000	70.500; 72.000	69.500; 74.000	68.500; 70.000	69.500; 69.000	69.900
