= Individual dressage at the 2005 European Dressage Championships =

The individual dressage at the 2005 European Dressage Championships in Hagen, Germany was held at Hof Kasselmann from 29 to 31 July 2005.

The Netherlands's Anky van Grunsven won Grand Prix, the Grand Prix Special and the Grand. Prix Freestyle and was crowned as overall European Champion. Hubertus Schmidt representing Germany won a silver medal, becoming second in the Grand Prix, second in the Grand Prix Special and third in the Grand Prix Freestyle. Jan Brink of Sweden won a bronze medal overall. after becoming third in the Grand Prix, fifth in the Grand Prix Special and second in the Grand Prix Freestyle. Germany won the golden team medal, The Netherlands won silver and Spain and Sweden won bronze with an ex-aequo result.

== Competition format ==
The team and individual dressage competitions used the same results. Dressage had three phases. The first phase was the Grand Prix. Top 25 individuals advanced to the second phase, the Grand Prix Special which was part of the individual overall ranking. The set of medals at the 2005 European Dressage Championships was awarded after the third phase, the Grand Prix Freestyle where the top 15 combinations competed, with a maximum of the three best riders per country.

== Schedule ==
All times are Central European Summer Time (UTC+1)

Date	Time	Round
Thursday, 28 July 2005	10:30	Grand Prix (Day 1)
Friday, 29 July 2005	10:30	Grand Prix (Day 2)
Saturday, 30 July 2005	10:00	Grand Prix Special
Sunday, 31 July 2005	11:00	Grand Prix Freestyle

== Results ==
Rider	Nation	Horse	GP score	Rank	GPS score	Rank	GPF score	Rank
Anky van Grunsven	Netherlands	Salinero	77.417	1 Q	76.160	1 Q	83.000	1
Hubertus Schmidt	Germany	Wansuela Suerte	74.625	2 Q	75.720	2 Q	80.525	3
Jan Brink	Sweden	Björsells Briar 899	74.292	3 Q	73.720	5 Q	81.000	2
Ann Kathrin Linsenhoff	Germany	Sterntaler UNICEF	74.250	4 Q	73.360	7 Q	72.350	13
Edward Gal	Netherlands	Lingh	72.917	5 Q	73.560	6 Q	76.650	6
Heike Kemmer	Germany	Bonaparte	72.833	6 Q	WD	-		
Carl Hester	Great Britain	Escapado	72.792	7 Q	74.320	3 Q	74.675	11
Karen Tebar	France	Falada M	72.292	8 Q	73.280	8 Q	. 72.350	14
Beatriz Ferrer-Salat	Spain	Beauvalais	71.833	9 Q	73.840	4 Q	75.375	8
Juan Antonio Jimenez	Spain	Guizo	71.792	10 Q	70.600	13 Q	79.550	4
Silvia Ikle	Switzerland	Salieri CH	71.583	11 Q	71.360	10 Q	75.775	7
Andreas Helgstrand	Denmark	Blue Horse Cavan	71.542	12 Q	70.760	12 Q	77.450	5
Lone Joergensen	Denmark	Hardthof's Ludewig G	70.833	13 Q	67.560	20		
Laurens van Lieren	Netherlands	Hexagon's Ollright	70.833	13 Q	70.280	15 Q	75.050	9
Kyra Kyrklund	Finland	Max	70.500	15 Q	71.720	9 Q	75.000	10
Tinne Vilhelmson	Sweden	Just Mickey	70.208	16 Q	71.240	11 Q	72.925	12
Alexandra Korelova	Russia	Balagur	69.708	17 Q	70.600	13 Q	70.375	15
Fiona Bigwood	Great Britain	Mr. G de Lully	69.708	17 Q	67.840	19		
Ignacio Rambla	Spain	Distinguido 2	69.500	19 Q	69.920	17		
Victoria Max-Theurer	Austria	Falcao	69.417	20 Q	67.400	21		
Klaus Husenbeth	Germany	Piccolino	69.250	21 Q	67.360	22		
Hubert Perring	France	Diabolo St Maurice	68.958	22 Q	65.360	24		
Emma Hindle	Great Britain	Wie Weltmeyer	68.792	23 Q	66.120	23		
Louise Nathorst	Sweden	Guinness	68.625	24 Q	69.960	16		
Christian Pläge	Switzerland	Regent	68.375	25 Q	69.840	18		
Elena Kalinina	Russia	Royal Black Label	68.000	26				
Fie Christine Skarsoe	Denmark	Münchhausen TSF	67.875	27				
Wayne Channon	Great Britain	Lorenzo CH	67.708	28				
Caroline Kottas-Heldenberg	Austria	Exupery	67.208	29				
Dominique d'Esmé	France	Roi de Cour GFD	66.833	30				
Nathalie zu Sayn-Wittgenstein	Denmark	Rigoletto	66.792	31				
Sven Rothenberger	Netherlands	Barclay II	66.667	32				
Miguel Duarte	Portugal	Oxalis da Meia Lua	66.667	32				
Marie-Line Wettstein	Switzerland	Le Primeur	65.708	34				
Carlos Pinto	Portugal	Novatel JCL Puy du Fou	65.542	35				
Jose Ignacio Lopez Porras	Spain	Nevado Santa Clara	64.917	36				
Jeroen Devroe	Belgium	Paganini	64.333	37				
Mieke Lunskens	Belgium	Jade	64.333	37				
Katarzyna Milczarek	Poland	Lecantos	64.083	39				
Renate Voglsang	Austria	Davidoff	63.917	40				
Claudia Montanari	Italy	Don Vittorio	63.792	41				
Heike Holstein	Ireland	Welt Adel	63.792	41				
Nina Stadlinger	Austria	Egalite	63.583	43				
Vera Minaeva	Russia	Gepard	63.458	44				
Jaroslaw Wierzchowski	Poland	Wieland	63.417	45				
Nuno Vicente	Portugal	Nostradamus do Top	63.042	46				
Marcela Krinke-Susmelj	Switzerland	Fibrin	62.833	47				
Tanja Ylikoski	Finland	Roi du Ballet	62.333	48				
Constance Menard	France	Lianca	62.292	49				
Zaneta Skowronska	Poland	Romeo	61.708	49				
Andre Parada	Portugal	Landim	61.042	50				
Svetlana Yevshchik	Russia	Dombai	60.958	52				
Halina Zotava	Belarus	Verona	60.083	53				
Philippe Jorissen	Belgium	Pikante Pia VD Bergerhoeve	58.792	54				
