= Individual dressage at the 2007 European Dressage Championships =

The individual dressage at the 2007 FEI European Dressage Championships in Turin, Italy was held at La Mandria from 30 August to 2 September 2007.

The Netherlands's Anky van Grunsven won the gold medal in the Grand Prix Freestyle. Isabell Werth representing Germany won a golden medal the Grand Prix Special and silver in the Grand Prix Freestyle. Imke Schellekens-Bartels of The Netherlands won a bronze in the Special and in the Freestyle. In the Grand Prix The Netherlands won the golden team medal, while the Great Britain won the silver medal and Germany bronze.

== Competition format ==
The team and individual dressage competitions used the same results. Dressage had three phases. The first phase was the Grand Prix. Top 30 individuals advanced to the second phase, the Grand Prix Special where the first individual medals were awarded. The last set of medals at the 2007 European Dressage Championships was awarded after the third phase, the Grand Prix Freestyle where top 15 combinations competed, with a maximum of the three best riders per country.

== Judges ==
The following judges were appointed to officiate during the European Dressage Championships.

- (Italy) Vincenzo Truppa (Ground Jury President)
- (France) Isabelle Judet (Ground Jury Member)
- (Germany) Evi Eisenhardt (Ground Jury Member)
- (Netherlands) Wim Ernes (Ground Jury Member)
- (United States) Gary Rockwell (Ground Jury Member)
- (Switzerland) Beatrice Bürchler-Keller (Ground Jury Member)
- (Denmark) Leif Törnblad (Ground Jury Member)
- (Germany) Gotthilf Riexinger (Technical Delegate)

== Schedule ==
All times are Central European Summer Time (UTC+1)

| Date | Time | Round |
|---|---|---|
| Wednesday, 30 August 2007 | 10:00 | Grand Prix (Day 1) |
| Thursday, 31 August 2007 | 10:00 | Grand Prix (Day 2) |
| Friday, 1 September 2007 | 9:30 | Grand Prix Special |
| Sunday, 2 September 2007 | 11:00 | Grand Prix Freestyle |

== Results ==
| Rider | Nation | Horse | GP score | Rank | GPS score | Rank | GPF score | Rank |
|---|---|---|---|---|---|---|---|---|
| Anky van Grunsven | Netherlands | Salinero | 77.458 | 1 Q | 77.480 | (silver) Q | 85,800 | 1st place, gold medalist(s) |
| Isabell Werth | Germany | Satchmo | 76.750 | 2 Q | 78.360 | (gold) Q | 83,200 | 2nd place, silver medalist(s) |
| Silvia Iklé | Switzerland | Salieri | 74.583 | 3 Q | 73.640 | 5 Q | 79,500 | 4 |
| Imke Schellekens-Bartels | Netherlands | Sunrise | 74.167 | 4 Q | 75.920 | (bronze) Q | 81,750 | 3rd place, bronze medalist(s) |
| Nadine Capellmann | Germany | Elvis VA | 72.417 | 5 Q | 74.120 | 4 Q | 78,300 | 5 |
| Ellen Schulten-Baumer | Germany | Donatha S | 71.667 | 6 Q | 72.240 | 9 | | |
| Tinne Vilhelmson-Silfvén | Sweden | Solos Carex | 71.042 | 7 Q | 73.600 | 6 Q | 71,350 | 12 |
| Hans-Peter Minderhoud | Netherlands | Exquis Nadine | 70.458 | 8 Q | 69.440 | 14 | | |
| Alexandra Korelova | Russia | Balagur | 70.333 | 9 Q | 72.360 | 8 Q | 78,200 | 6 |
| Andreas Helgstrand | Denmark | Casmir | 70.250 | 10 Q | 69.800 | 13 Q | 72,650 | 9 |
| Kyra Kyrklund | Finland | Max | 70.000 | 10 Q | 67.240 | 19 | | |
| Monica Theodorescu | Germany | Whisper 128 | 69.708 | 12 Q | 72.880 | 7 Q | 71,750 | 11 |
| Laura Bechtolsheimer | Great Britain | Mistral Hojris | 69.583 | 13 Q | 67.200 | 20 | | |
| Jan Brink | Sweden | Bjorsells Briar | 69.208 | 14 Q | 71.880 | 10 Q | 76,000 | 8 |
| Laurens van Lieren | Netherlands | Hexagon's Ollright | 68.542 | 15 Q | 71.160 | 11 Q | 76,950 | 7 |
| Victoria Max-Theurer | Austria | Falcao OLD | 68.375 | 16 Q | 69.920 | 12 Q | 71,350 | 12 |
| Emma Hindle | Great Britain | Lancet | 68.042 | 17 Q | 67.080 | 21 | | |
| Louise Nathorst | Sweden | Isidor | 67.750 | 18 Q | 63.800 | 26 | | |
| Anna Ross-Davis | Great Britain | Liebling II | 67.417 | 19 Q | 68.040 | 16 Q | 71,950 | 10 |
| Hubert Perring | France | Fuego de Cardenas | 67.208 | 20 Q | 62.520 | 29 | | |
| Anna Paprocka-Campanella | Italy | Andretti H | 66.917 | 21 Q | 68.000 | 17 Q | 69,750 | 14 |
| Per Sandgaard | Sweden | Orient | 66.583 | 22 Q | 63.000 | 28 | | |
| Veronika Marthaler | Switzerland | Romario | 66.542 | 23 Q | 63.560 | 27 | | |
| Nathalie Zu-Sayn Wittgenstein | Denmark | Rigoletto | 66.417 | 24 Q | 68.600 | 15 Q | EL | 15 |
| Jeroen Devroe | Belgium | Paganini | 66.333 | 25 Q | 65.480 | 23 | | |
| Miguel Ralao Duarte | Portugal | Oxalis Da Meia Lua | 66.250 | 26 Q | 64.240 | 25 | | |
| Sanne Henningsen | Denmark | Clearwater | 66.125 | 27 Q | 65.920 | 22 | | |
| Hannes Mayr | Austria | Ellis | 65.833 | 27 Q | 64.760 | 24 | | |
| Fiona Bigwood | Great Britain | Mr. G de Lully | 65.167 | 29 Q | 67.360 | 18 | | |
| Nina Stadlinger | Austria | Egalité | 64.958 | 29 Q | 62.400 | 30 | | |
| Tatiana Miloserdova | Russia | What a Feeling | 64.708 | 31 | | | | |
| Constance Menard | France | Lianca | 64.667 | 32 | | | | |
| Elena Sidneva | Russia | Artax Condor RBB | 64.583 | 33 | | | | |
| Juan Matute | Spain | Wie Atlantico Ymas | 64.500 | 34 | | | | |
| Juan Manuel Munoz Diaz | Spain | Fuego XXIV | 64.500 | 34 | | | | |
| Jordi Domingo Coll | Spain | Prestige | 64.375 | 36 | | | | |
| Olga Klimko | Ukraine | Highlight | 64.208 | 37 | | | | |
| Christian Pläge | Switzerland | Regent | 64.208 | 37 | | | | |
| Daniel Pinto | Portugal | Galopin de la Font | 63.958 | 39 | | | | |
| Joachim Thomson | Denmark | Mikado Engvang | 63.958 | 40 | | | | |
| Marie-Line Wettstein | Switzerland | Le Primeur | 63.917 | 41 | | | | |
| Francoise Hologne-Joux | Belgium | Born | 63.167 | 42 | | | | |
| Eva-Maria Bachinger | Austria | Palazzo | 63.125 | 43 | | | | |
| Wim Verwimp | Belgium | Maxwill V | 63.083 | 44 | | | | |
| Odile van Doorn | France | Parodie v/d Wateringhoeve | 63.000 | 44 | | | | |
| Anna Merveldt | Ireland | Coryolano | 62.708 | 46 | | | | |
| Pedro Valente Torres | Portugal | Riopele | 62.667 | 46 | | | | |
| David Engelen | Belgium | Artic's Rosantica | 62.417 | 48 | | | | |
| Miquel Lauro Aguilo | Spain | @uxtro van de Vlasbloemhoeve | 62.167 | 49 | | | | |
| Julia Chevanne | France | Calimucho | 62.167 | 49 | | | | |
| Carlos Pinto | Portugal | Novatel Puy Du Fou | 61.917 | 50 | | | | |
| Svetlana Kiseliova | Ukraine | Parish | 61.583 | 52 | | | | |
| Anett Kristin Olsen | Norway | Potifar | 61.417 | 53 | | | | |
| Judy Reynolds | Ireland | Burgfräulein | 60.083 | 54 | | | | |
| Ksenia Morozkina | Russia | Lady Lux | 60.042 | 55 | | | | |
