= Oxalis (disambiguation) =

Oxalis may refer to:

- Oxalis, plant of the woodsorrel genus Oxalis
- Oxalis (restaurant), a Michelin-starred restaurant in New York City
- Tadoritsuku Basho/Oxalis
- Oxalis da Meia Lua, dressage horse ridden in the 2006 FEI World Equestrian Games and at the 2008 Summer Olympics by Miguel Ralão Duarte, see Individual freestyle dressage at the 2006 World Equestrian Games
