= Birgit Wientzek Pläge =

Swiss dressage rider (born 1971)

Personal information
- Full name: Birgit Wientzek Pläge
- Nationality: Swiss
- Born: 5 May 1971 (age 55)
- Website: www.greengold.ch

Sport
- Country: Switzerland
- Sport: Equestrian

Achievements and titles
- World finals: 2018 FEI World Equestrian Games

Birgit Wientzek Pläge (born 5 May 1971) is a Swiss dressage rider and trainer. She competed at the World Equestrian Games in Tryon 2018 and at four European Dressage Championships (in 2003, 2015, 2019 and 2021). She earned a quota place for Switzerland to send an individual rider for the Olympic Games in Tokyo, but was not eventually selected to compete.

Her husband Christian Pläge competed at the 2004 Olympic Games in Athens.
