= Brantridge Park =

Country house in Balcombe, West Sussex, England

Coordinates: 51°3′26.32″N 0°9′52.64″W

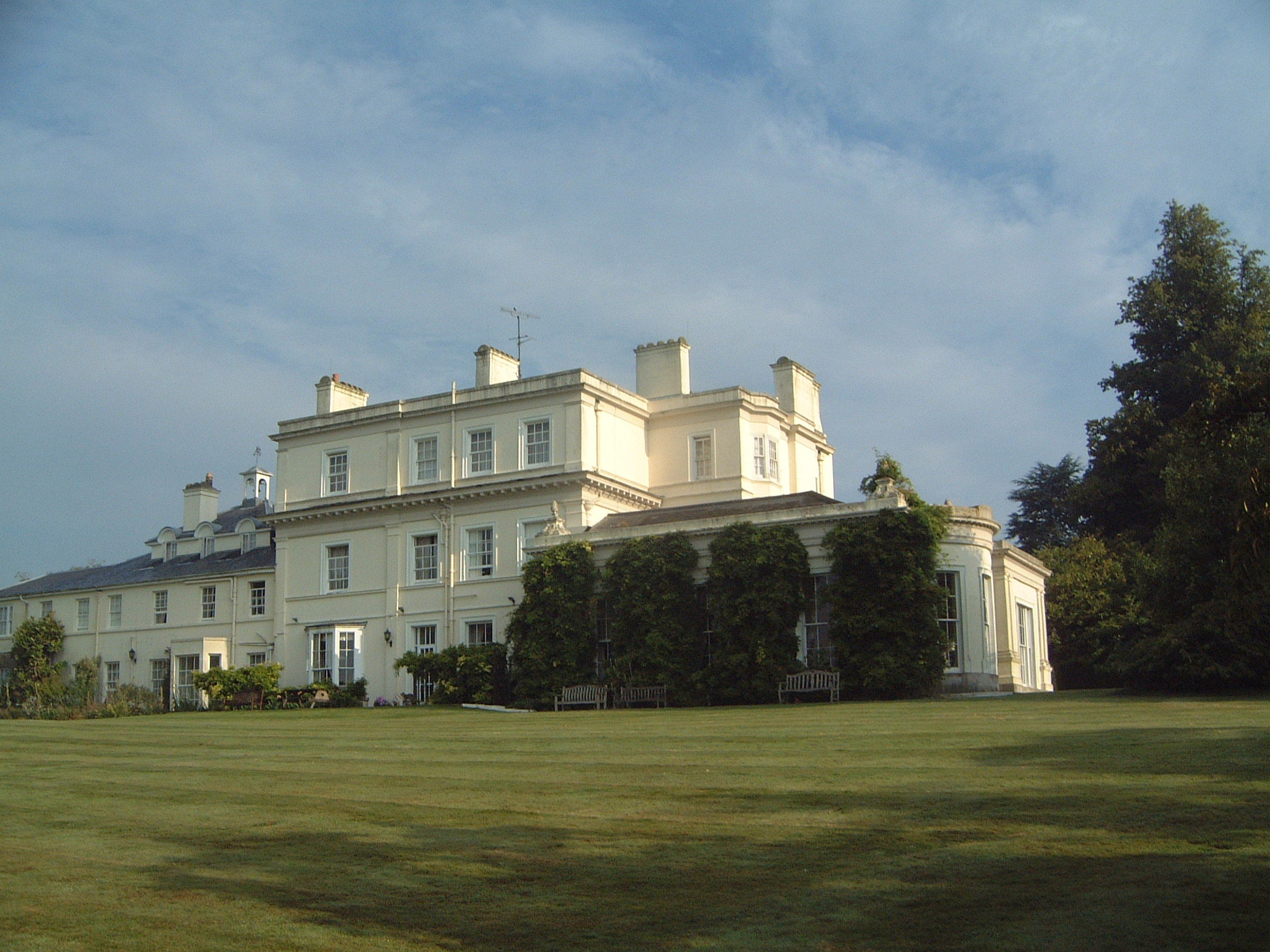
Brantridge Park

Brantridge Park, Balcombe, West Sussex, England is a 19th-century country house, formerly one of the lesser royal residences. It is a Grade II listed building.

== History ==
The house and grounds replaced Brantridge farmhouse and farm. Sir Robert Loder, 1st Baronet acquired the estate in 1849, and by 1874, Brantridge Park mansion had been built.

Standing in Brantridge Forest, it was the seat of Alexander Cambridge, 1st Earl of Athlone (and brother of Queen Mary), and his wife, Princess Alice of Albany, the last surviving grandchild of Queen Victoria. They leased the house Weetman Pearson, 1st Viscount Cowdray from 1922 onwards.

Princess Beatrice, youngest and last surviving child of Queen Victoria and aunt of Princess Alice, also lived in Brantridge Park until her death in her sleep here on 26 October 1944, aged 87.

Sir Denys Lowson, at one time Lord Mayor of London, lived there for some years after the Athlones. The house was then used as a home for disabled children.

== 21st century ==
The house was divided into apartments, and operated as a time-share resort until January 2008.

In December 2016, Brantridge Park was bought by Anders Dahl and his wife, Fiona Bigwood.
