= Evelyn Haim-Swarovski =

Austrian dressage rider (born 1954)

Personal information
- Born: July 7, 1954 (age 71)

Evelyn Haim-Swarovski (born 7 July 1954) is an Austrian dressage rider. Representing Austria, she competed at the 2006 World Equestrian Games and at 2015 European Dressage Championships.

Her current best championship result is 9th place in team dressage from the 2015 Europeans while her current best individual result is 51st place achieved at the 2006 World Games.

Her family owns and runs Swarovski crystal company.
