= Julija Ona Vysniauskas =

Canadian equestrian (born 1981)

Personal information
- Full name: Julija Ona Vysniauskas
- Nationality: Canada, Lithuania
- Born: Aug 12, 1981 (age 44) Cochrane, Alberta, Canada

Sport
- Country: Canada
- Sport: Equestrian

Achievements and titles
- World finals: 2006 FEI World Equestrian Games

Julija Ona Vysniauskas (born 21 August 1981, Cochrane, Alberta) is a Canadian dressage rider. She competed at the 2006 FEI World Equestrian Games representing Lithuania as the first Lithuanian dressage rider in history to participate in the World Equestrian Games, riding her horse Syntax. Julija is a Canadian-born athlete of Lithuanian descent. She competed under the Canadian flag until 2003, when she changed her sporting nationality in to Lithuanian. In 2017, she decided to compete again under the Canadian flag. In 2018, she won the Grand Prix and Grand Prix Special at the CDI Calgary.
