= Anders Dahl (equestrian) =

Danish Olympic dressage rider

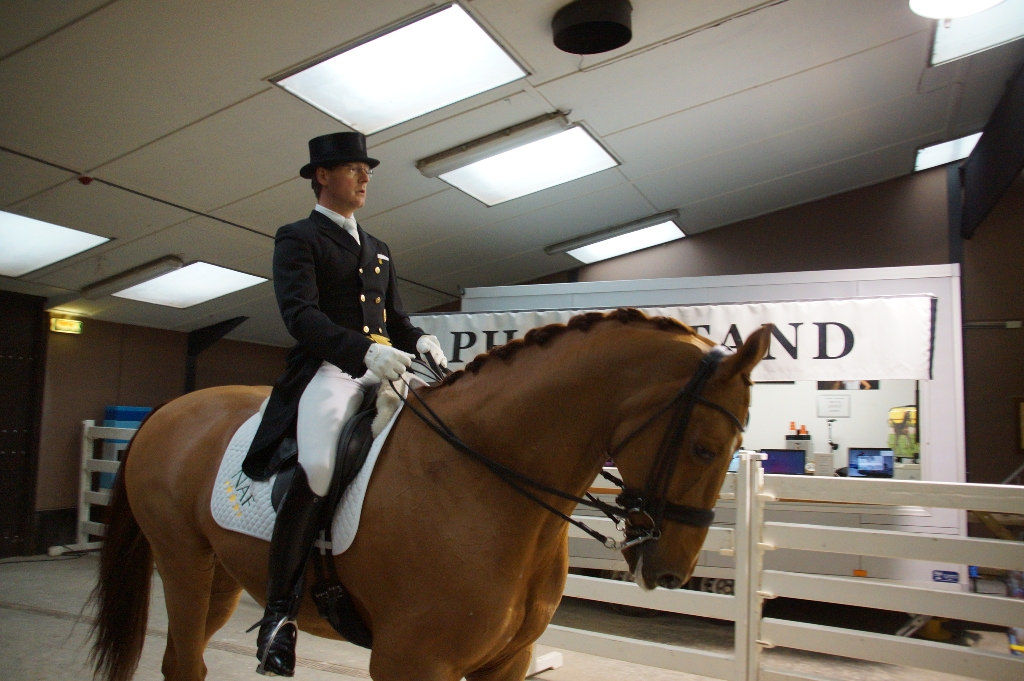

Personal information
- Born: 11 March 1976 (age 50)

Anders Dahl (born 11 March 1976) is a Danish Olympic dressage rider. He competed at the 2016 Summer Olympics in Rio de Janeiro where he finished 30th in the individual and 6th in the team competition.

Dahl also competed at the 2006 World Equestrian Games, placing 4th in team dressage. In 2008, he participated at Dressage World Cup final in Den Bosch where he finished 10th.

He was married to the fellow dressage rider Fiona Bigwood.

In 2016, Dahl and his now ex-wife Bigwood relocated from Bourne Hill House in Horsham in West Sussex to Brantridge Park in order to establish a new world class equestrian facility.

Dahl is now thought to be living in another property in West Sussex following his divorce from Bigwood.

== Notable horses ==
- Afrikka - 1990 Bay Gelding
  - 2006 World Equestrian Games - Team Fourth Place, Individual 34th Place
  - 2008 FEI World Cup Final - Tenth Place
- Selten HW - 2004 Black Hanoverian Gelding (Sandro Hit x Hohenstein)
  - 2016 Rio Olympics - Team Sixth Place, Individual 30th Place
