= Fie Christine Skarsoe =

Luxembourgish equestrian

Personal information
- Born: 18 December 1976 (age 49) Aarhus, Denmark

Sport
- Country: Luxembourg
- Sport: Equestrian

Fie Christine Skarsoe (born 18 December 1976, Aarhus) is a Danish-born equestrian athlete competing for Luxembourg. She competed at the European Championships in 2005 under the Danish flag and in 2015 and 2019 under the flag of Luxembourg.

== Biography ==
Fie started riding at an age of nine in Denmark and competed successfully in the youth division. She competed at the European Championships for Young Riders in 1996. In 2006 she moved to Luxembourg where she met her husband. In 2015 she obtained her dual citizenship and competed that same year for Luxembourg at the European Championships in Aachen.

== Personal life ==
Fie Christine Skarsoe is married to her Luxembourgish husband Ken Gruber, which is a national show-jumper. She is fluent in Danish, English and German.
