= Robert Acs =

Hungarian equestrian (born 1980)

Personal information
- Born: Jul 1, 1980 (age 45) Debrecen Hungary
- Website: dressurzentrum.hu

Sport
- Country: Hungary
- Sport: Equestrian
- Club: Acs Jozsef LSE: Máriakálnok

Achievements and titles
- World finals: 2006 World Equestrian Games

Robert Acs (born 1 July 1980) is a Hungarian equestrian athlete from Budapest. He competed at the 2006 World Championships in Aachen as individual and competed as first Hungarian dressage rider at the World Cup Final in Leipzig in 2011. In 2017 he was one of the team members at the European Championships in Goteborg in 2017, where Hungary has a dressage team for the first time in history at a European Dressage Championship.

== See also ==
- Equestrianism
- Arly Golombek
