= Susan de Klein =

Dutch dressage rider (1973–2019)

Personal information
- Nationality: Dutch
- Born: 29 May 1973; Ewijk, Netherlands
- Died: 7 November 2019 (aged 46); Beuningen, Netherlands

Sport
- Country: Netherlands Antilles
- Sport: Equestrian
- Event: Dressage

Achievements and titles
- World finals: Aachen 2006, Lexington KY 2010

Susan de Klein (29 May 1973 – 7 November 2019) was a Dutch dressage rider who competed for the Netherlands Antilles until 2012. She competed at the World Equestrian Games in 2006 in Aachen and 2010 in Lexington, Kentucky, which made her the most successful rider for the Dutch Antilles. She also competed at several World Cup and major international events through Europe. De Klein was a highly respected rider and trainer and competed several horses on Grand Prix level, while she coached several riders up to higher level.

In 2019 De Klein lost her fight to cancer. She was only 46 years old.
