= Emily Ward Hansen =

Antiguan equestrian

Personal information
- Born: Emily Ward; December 11, 1977 (age 48) Willikies, Antigua and Barbuda

Sport
- Country: Antigua and Barbuda
- Sport: Equestrian

Achievements and titles
- World finals: 2006 World Equestrian Games

Emily Ward Hansen (born 11 December 1977, Willikies, Antigua and Barbuda) is an Antiguan dressage rider who represented Antigua and Barbuda at the 2006 World Equestrian Games for the first time in history. Ward was selected to compete at the 2008 Olympic Games, but due an injury of her horse, she was not able to represent her country. She spend 12 years in The Netherlands before she moved to Germany and Denmark, where she met Danish dressage rider Sune Hansen. The couple married in 2010 and moved later to the United Kingdom where they established their dressage stable in Heathfield, East Sussex.
