= Żaneta Skowrońska =

Polish dressage rider

Zaneta Skowronska
Personal information
- Born: October 11, 1979 (age 46) Zakrzów, Kędzierzyn-Koźle County, Poland

Żaneta Skowrońska (born 11 October 1979 in Zakrzów, Kędzierzyn-Koźle County, Poland) is a Polish dressage rider. Representing Poland, she competed at two World Equestrian Games (in 2006 and 2014) and at four European Dressage Championships (in 2005, 2013, 2015 and 2021).

Her current best championship result is 12th places in team dressage at the 2005 European Championships and 2006 World Equestrian Games, while her current best individual result is 45th place from the 2015 European Championships.

Skowrońska was nominated by the Polish Equestrian Federation to represent the Poland team at the 2024 Olympic Games in Paris, but her horse Love Me was not fit which resulted in a withdrawal from the competition. The first reserve Aleksandra Szulc replaced her.
