= Judy Reynolds =

Irish dressage rider

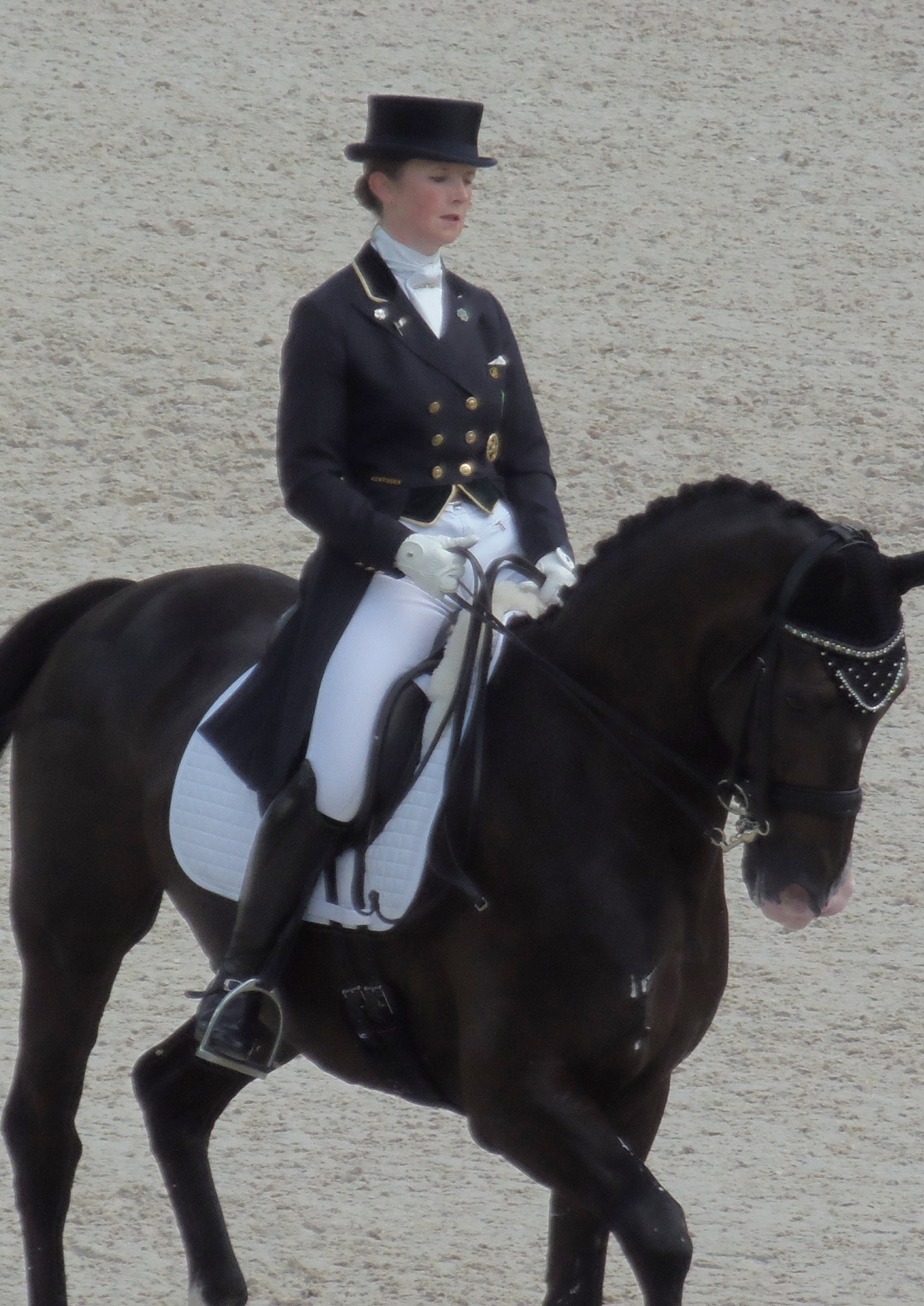
- Judy Reynolds and Vancouver K (2014 FEI World Equestrian Games)

Personal information
- Born: 11 June 1981 (age 45) Kildare, Ireland

Judy Reynolds (born 11 June 1981 in Kildare, Ireland) is an Irish Olympic dressage rider. Representing Ireland, she participated at the 2016 Summer Olympics in Rio de Janeiro, Brazil, where she achieved 18th place in the individual competition.

Reynolds also competed at four World Equestrian Games (in 2006, 2010, 2014 and 2018) and at four European Championships (in 2007, 2011, 2015 and 2019). Her current best championship results were achieved in 2019, when she placed 5th in both special and freestyle competitions.

Reynolds participated at three editions of World Cup Finals (in 2016, 2017 and 2019). Her best result came at the 2017 Finals held in Omaha, Nebraska, where she placed 4th.

She was named the Irish Dressage Rider of the Year in 2008, 2014, 2015, 2016, 2017 and 2018.

== Dressage results ==
=== Olympic Games ===
Event	Team	Individual	Horse
(Brazil) 2016 Rio de Janeiro	—	18th	Vancouver K

=== World Championships ===
Event	Team	Individual	Freestyle	Horse
(Germany) 2006 Aachen	—	71st	—	Rathbawn Valet
(United States) 2010 Lexington	—	61st	—	Remember
(France) 2014 Normandy	22nd	94th	—	Vancouver K
(United States) 2018 Tryon	—	15th	—	Vancouver K

=== European Championships ===
Event	Team	Individual	Freestyle	Horse
(Italy) 2007 La Mandria	—	54th	—	Burgfraulein
(Netherlands) 2011 Rotterdam	—	57th	—	Remember
(Germany) 2015 Aachen	—	34th	—	Vancouver K
(Netherlands) 2019 Rotterdam	7th	5th	5th	Vancouver K

=== World Cup ===
==== Final ====
Event	Score	Rank	Horse
(Sweden) 2016 Gothenburg	77.339%	8th	Vancouver K
(United States) 2017 Omaha	79.571%	4th	Vancouver K
(Sweden) 2019 Gothenburg	79.350%	11th	Vancouver K

==== Western European League ====
Season	Points	Rank
2014-15	7	53rd
2015-16	38	13th Q
2016-17	57	3rd Q
2018-19	49	11th Q

- Q - denotes qualification for the World Cup Final

==== Western European League podiums ====
Season	Place	Placement	Horse
2018-19	(Germany) Neumünster	3rd	Vancouver K
