= Andreas Helgstrand =

Danish dressage rider (born 1977)

Medal record

Equestrian

Representing Denmark

Olympic Games
Bronze medal – third place	2008 Beijing	Team dressage

World Championships
Silver medal – second place	2006 Aachen	Freestyle dressage
Bronze medal – third place	2006 Aachen	Special dressage

European Championships
Bronze medal – third place	2023 Riesenbeck	Team dressage

Andreas Helgstrand (born 2 October 1977) is a Danish dressage rider. He won four consecutive Danish dressage championships, from 2005 through 2008. Helgstrand is banned from competition until 2025.

== Early life ==
Andreas Helgstrand was born 2 October 1977 to Ulf Helgstrand and his wife. His father became president of the Danish Equestrian Federation in 2003. Andreas started competitive riding aged 7 or 8, competing initially in showjumping. At the age of 17, he started training as a riding master in 1994 at the Sport Riding Club in Aalborg. He passed the final exams in 2000.

== Career ==
Helgstrand has worked as a horse trainer, riding instructor, and horse trader; first in the Netherlands with Anne van Olst, then in Kongsberg in Norway, before replacing Lars Petersen at the Blue Hors stud in Randboel, Denmark. At the 2004 Olympics, riding Cavan, Helgstrand came in ninth in the individual and fifth in the team. He finished fourth in the 2004 poll for Danish sportsperson of the year.

At the 2006 World Equestrian Games, riding the mare Matiné, Helgstrand came in second in the Individual freestyle and third in the individual special. Eurodressage's report of the tournament called him "the favourite of the crowd" and said he "seemed to have redefined piaffe and passage". A video of this performance (to the hip-hop song "No Mo" by Red Astaire) has circulated widely on YouTube, being seen over 5 million times.

Helgstrand withdrew from the 2007 Dressage World Cup finals in Las Vegas when Matiné twisted her left front pastern on arrival while getting out of the van. She was retired from competition in the months afterward, as she was unable to recover from the injury. In 2010 she was euthanised after breaking a leg in the pasture.

In 2008, Helgstrand won his fourth consecutive Danish dressage championship, on his fourth horse (Don Schufro, after Cavan, Matiné and Casmir). At the 2008 Olympics, riding Don Schufro, he came in eleventh in the individual and third in the team.

At the end of 2008, Helgstrand left the Blue Hors stud to start his own business, which he named Helgstrand Dressage, at Møgelmosegård near Aalborg.

In 2010, Helgstrand rode Uno Donna Unique to victory in the 6-year-old class at the 2010 World Championships for Young Dressage Horses. In 2013, he became embroiled in a dispute regarding the sale of Uno Donna Unique.

Helgstrand was shortlisted for the Danish dressage team for the 2012 Olympics, but was not selected.

== Business ==
In 2008, Helgstrand set up his own business, Helgstrand Dressage. In 2021, he merged this business into a new entity, Global Equestrian Group with Ludger Beerbaum. The company participates in various activities around horse sport, from breeding, dressage, show jumping, events to real estate. Helgstrand's personal holding company Wama Consult Aps was found to have an equity of 1.026 billion DKK in 2020.

== Notable Horses ==
- Blue Hors Cavan - 1990 Bay Hanoverian Gelding (Cavalier x Damnatz)
  - 2004 Athens Olympics - Team Fifth Place, Individual Ninth Place
  - 2005 FEI World Cup Final - Fifth Place
  - 2005 European Championships - Team Sixth Place, Individual Ninth Place
- Blue Hors Matine - 1997 Gray Danish Warmblood Mare (Silvermoon x Matador)
  - 2006 World Equestrian Games - Team Fourth Place, Individual Bronze Medal, Individual Silver Medal Freestyle
- Gredstedgards Casmir - 1999 Dark Bay Danish Warmblood Gelding (Continue x Rastell)
  - 2007 European Championships - Team Sixth Place, Individual 13th Place, Individual Ninth Place Freestyle
  - 2008 FEI World Cup Final - Seventh Place
- Blue Hors Don Schufro - 1993 Chestnut Oldenburg Stallion (Donnerhall)
  - 2008 Beijing Olympics - Team Bronze Medal, Individual Tenth Place
- Carabas - 1998 Dark Bay Holsteiner Stallion (Carnaby x Roberto)
  - 2009 European Championships - Team Fifth Place, Individual 29th Place
- Akeem Foldager - 2002 Bay Danish Warmblood Gelding (Akinos x Loran)
  - 2013 European Championships - Team Fourth Place, Individual 23rd Place
- Ferrari OLD - 2012 Dark Bay Oldenburg Stallion (Foundation 2 x Blue Hors Hotline)
  - 2017 FEI Dressage Young Horse World Championships - Silver Medal
- Springbank VH - 2010 Chestnut Swedish Warmblood Gelding (Skovens Rafael x De Niro)
  - 2017 FEI Dressage Young Horse World Championships - 14th Place

== Controversies ==
In 2014, Helgstrand was accused of abusing his horse Akeem Foldager in a social media campaign which circulated a photograph of the horse with a blue tongue. On 28 November 2014, a court in Aalborg acquitted him of all animal cruelty charges. However, the Danish Equestrian Federation ruled on 2 February 2015 that Helgstrand was guilty of "improper use of bit and bridle" and that his use of a double-bridle was "completely unacceptable". The incident caused several of his sponsors to drop him, and he lost his eligibility to compete in the 2014 World Equestrian Games. Later that year, the website Epona.tv published photos of Helgstrand warming up his horse Torveslettens Stamina in a rollkur position, though he was not warned or sanctioned at the event.

In 2022, Helgstrand on Queenpark's Wendy was disqualified from the Stockholm Grand Prix when the judge stopped him mid-performance after noticing pink froth on the horse's mouth. A veterinarian determined it was a minor injury and Helgstrand was allowed to compete with the horse the following day. A few months later, the pair were again disqualified from the World Cup Grand Prix in Amsterdam for the blood rule when Queenpark's Wendy bit her own tongue.

In June 2023, Helgstrand was disqualified from the Danish Championships when it was found that his horse Jovian had been treated with a medication on show grounds without first disclosing it to the show authorities. The horse's veterinarian testified that Helgstrand was not aware the horse had been treated for a mild colic the night before the competition, and that the medications were not on the FEI list of banned substances. However, the show was not governed by FEI rules, but by Dansk Ride Forbund's which require medications to be approved by the DRF veterinary advisor before administering them. Helgstrand was held as the responsible party under the Danish rules and had to return the bronze medal he won and pay a fine.

=== Operation X ===
In September 2023, he once again came under fire for alleged animal abuse. This time it was an undercover documentary, that allegedly exposed the use of training methods that were illegal in Denmark, as well as other controversial methods that were hidden from customers and visitors.

In the videos, undercover footage shows grooms concealing open spur marks with shoe polish and hide whip marks by blankets. They also discuss horses bleeding as a result of their training regimes, and are horses are shown being ridden in a tight frame, behind the vertical.

Helgstrand filed an injunction against Danish television station TV2, the producer of the documentary to prevent the program from being shown. He was unsuccessful, and the program was broadcast.

In November 2023, Helgstrand was removed from the Danish national dressage team – and reported to the police – following the broadcast of the Operation X documentary filmed undercover at Helgstrand Dressage. His ban will last at least until January 1, 2025.

As a result, his father Ulf Helgstrand, who had been chairman of the Danish Equestrian Federation since 2003, took a leave of absence from his position, and later resigned in April 2024.

In October 2024, as his suspension from the Danish equestrian team was due to lift, Helgstrand was banned for an additional three months after evidence in his involvement in another suspect training episode came to light.
