= Iryna Lis =

Belarusian dressage rider

Iryna Lis (born 26 December 1972) is a Belarusian dressage rider. She competed at the 2004 Summer Olympics where she finished 24th in the individual dressage competition. She also competed at the 2008 Summer Olympics.
