= Fiona Bigwood =

British equestrian (born 1976)

Personal information
- Born: 24 April 1976 (age 50) Camberwell, United Kingdom
Medal record
Equestrian
Representing Great Britain
Olympics
Silver medal – second place	2016 Rio de Janeiro	Team dressage
World Championships
Silver medal – second place	2010 Kentucky	Team dressage
Silver medal – second place	2026 Aachen	Team dressage
European Championships
Silver medal – second place	2015 Aachen	Team dressage
World Championships for Young Dressage Horses
Gold medal – first place	2024 Ermelo	Individual dressage

Fiona Bigwood (born 24 April 1976 in Camberwell, United Kingdom) is a British dressage rider and winner of a silver medal in the team dressage event at the 2016 Summer Olympics.

== Early life ==
Bigwood was born on 24 April 1976. By the time she was 10, Bigwood rode Tanya Larrigan's old Grand Prix horse Salute on lease. She soon competed at the 1993 Junior European Championships and the Young Rider European Championships. As a teenager, she trained in Denmark and was educated at Croydon High School.

== Career ==
In 1997, Bigwood became the youngest British rider to be selected for a Senior European Championships. In the same year, she won the British National Elementary title with Afrikka and was shortlisted for the 1998 World Equestrian Games. Afterwards, she competed at the 2010 World Equestrian Games and four European Dressage Championships (1999, 2005, 2007 and 2015). In 2014, she suffered a concussion after a fall while riding. As a result of her injury, Bigwood experiences double vision, which means that she wears an eye patch while riding.

Upon returning to competitions, Bigwood earned a silver medal for Great Britain in the team dressage event at the 2016 Summer Olympics. However, she would later sell her silver medal-winning horse "Atterupgaards Orthilia" to Danish rider Agnete Kirk Thinggaard.

== Personal life ==
She was married with three children; her ex-husband, Anders Dahl, is also a dressage rider.

In 2016, Bigwood and her ex-husband relocated from Bourne Hill House in Horsham in West Sussex to Brantridge Park, where she is in the process of establishing a new world-class equestrian centre.

== Notable horses ==
- Mr G de Lully - 1993 Bay Swedish Warmblood Gelding (Gauguin de Lully x Ambassadeur)
  - 2005 European Championships - Team Fifth Place, Individual 20th Place
  - 2007 European Championships - Team Fifth Place, Individual 18th Place
- Wie-Atlantico De Ymas - 1999 Chestnut Hanoverian Gelding (Wie Weltmeyer x Rondo)
  - 2010 World Equestrian Games - Team Silver Medal, Individual 16th Place, Individual 12th Place Freestyle
- Atterupgaards Orthilia - 2005 Bay Oldenburg Mare (Gribaldi x Donnerschlag)
  - 2015 European Championships - Team Silver Medal, Individual Ninth Place
  - 2016 Rio Olympics - Team Silver Medal, Individual 17th Place
- Quinn G - 2018 Chestnut Danish Warmblood Mare (Quaterhit x Fassbinder)
  - 2024 World Breeding Championships for Young Dressage Horses - Gold Medal
