= Marcela Krinke-Susmelj =

Swiss dressage rider (1965–2024)

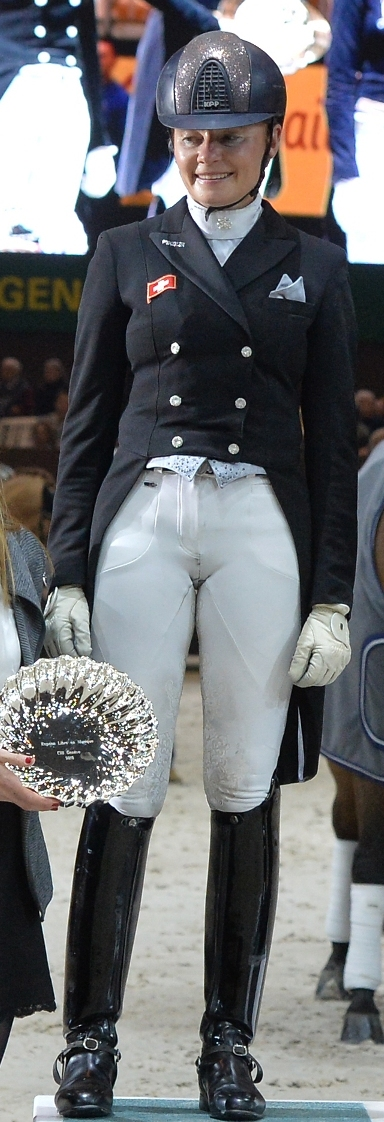
- Pictured 2016

Personal information
- National team: Switzerland
- Born: 18 October 1965 Vlašim, Czechoslovakia
- Died: 17 July 2024 (aged 58)
- Occupation(s): Dressage rider and veterinarian
- Employer(s): Obergrund Veterinary Clinic, Rotsee Riding Centre
- Agent: Irene Meyer (sponsor and patron)
- Spouse(s): Ivan Susmelj, Yugoslav dressage champion and trainer, married 1996
- Website: https://marcelakrinke.ch/

Sport
- Country: Switzerland
- Sport: Dressage
- Coached by: Ton de Ridder, Daniel Ramseier
- Retired: 2018

Achievements and titles
- Olympic finals: 2016 Summer Olympics
- National finals: Swiss Grand Prix Championships 2012, 2013, 2016 and 2017

Marcela Krinke-Susmelj (18 October 1965 – 17 July 2024) was a Czechoslovak-born Swiss Olympic dressage rider. She participated at the 2016 Summer Olympics in Rio de Janeiro, Brazil, where she placed 24th in the individual competition.

Krinke-Susmelj competed at three editions of World Equestrian Games (2006, 2010 and 2014), six European Dressage Championships (2005, 2007, 2011, 2013, 2015 and 2017) and four World Cup Finals (2013, 2014, 2016 and 2017). Her best championship results were two 8th places in team dressage competitions (from the 2005 Europeans and the 2006 Worlds), while her best individual result is 11th place in freestyle dressage from the 2010 World Equestrian Games.

== Biography ==
Marcela Krinke was born 18 October 1965 in Vlašim, Czechoslovakia. She and her parents fled the country to Switzerland in 1968 during the Soviet invasion of the country.

She first began riding horses on her twelfth birthday, after receiving lessons as a birthday present. After high school, Marcela Krinke continued her riding career while pursuing studies in veterinary science, writing her doctoral thesis on cardiology and pursuing an internship at Washington State University in the United States. She returned to Switzerland to set up a small animal medical practice.

She would later meet her husband, Yugoslav dressage champion Ivan Susmelj when training in Lausen. Susmelj was the former trainer at the Lipica Stud Farm in Slovenia, and the pair would go on to have a long association of training and owning Lippizan horses.

In 1996, Marcela and Ivan established the Rotsee Riding Center, and Marcela focused on riding and training full time. At Rotsee Riding Center, Krinke-Susmelj met Irine Meyer, who would become her long-time sponsor and patron, helping acquire top level horses for her to compete at the international level.

=== International competition ===
In 2005, Krinke-Susmelj first represented Switzerland at the international level when she competed at the European Dressage Championships. She would go on to compete at the 2006 World Equestrian Games riding Corinth, an Oldenburg gelding with whom she would ride at a host of international and European competitions until his retirement in 2011.

In 2010, Krinke-Susmelj acquired the ride on Atterupgaards Molberg, a Danish warmblood with whom the pair would become one of Switzerland's most successful dressage competitors. Together, the pair were champions at the Swiss Grand Prix Championships in 2012, 2013, 2016 and 2017. Krinke-Susmelj and Atterupgaards Molberg would go to the 2016 Summer Olympics and represent Switzerland at the 2013, 2014, 2016 and 2017 World Cup Finals.

Krinke-Susmelj was notable at the time for being the only Swiss dressage rider on the international stage. At the time of her appearance at the 2013 World Cup Finals, no Swiss horse and riding pairing had made it to the Grand Prix finals for a decade. At the time of her appearance in Rio at the 2016 Summer Olympics, no Swiss horse-rider dressage pairing had reached the games in twelve years.

Despite qualifying, Krinke-Susmelj did not ride Atterupgaards Molberg at the 2018 World Cup Finals. At the time, she said she did not want to ask too much of her 17-year-old Olympic horse.

=== Later life ===
Krinke-Susmelj was diagnosed with Alzheimers disease in 2019 and was forced to retire at the age of 54.

She died on 17 July 2024, at the age of 58 shortly after the death of her husband. She and her husband Ivan Susmelj had two children who now run their Rotsee Riding Centre.

== Personal bests ==
Personal bests as of February 2017
Event	Score	Horse	Venue	Date
Grand Prix	74.260	Molberg	Lyon, France	29 October 2015
Grand Prix Special	74.874	Molberg	Caen, France	27 August 2014
Grand Prix Freestyle	78.000	Molberg	Lyon, France	30 October 2015
