= Karen Tebar =

German-French dressage rider

Personal information
- Born: 19 September 1964 (age 62) Ludwigsburg, Germany

Sport
- Country: France
- Sport: Equestrian

Karen Tebar (born 19 September 1964 in Ludwigsburg, Germany) is a German-born French Olympic dressage rider. Representing France, she has competed at two Olympic Games (in 2004 and 2016). Her current best Olympic result is 8th place in the team dressage competition in 2016 while her current best individual result is 21st place from 2004.

Tebar also competed at the 2006 World Equestrian Games and at four European Dressage Championships (in 2003, 2005, 2013 and 2015).
