= Leslie Morse =

American equestrian

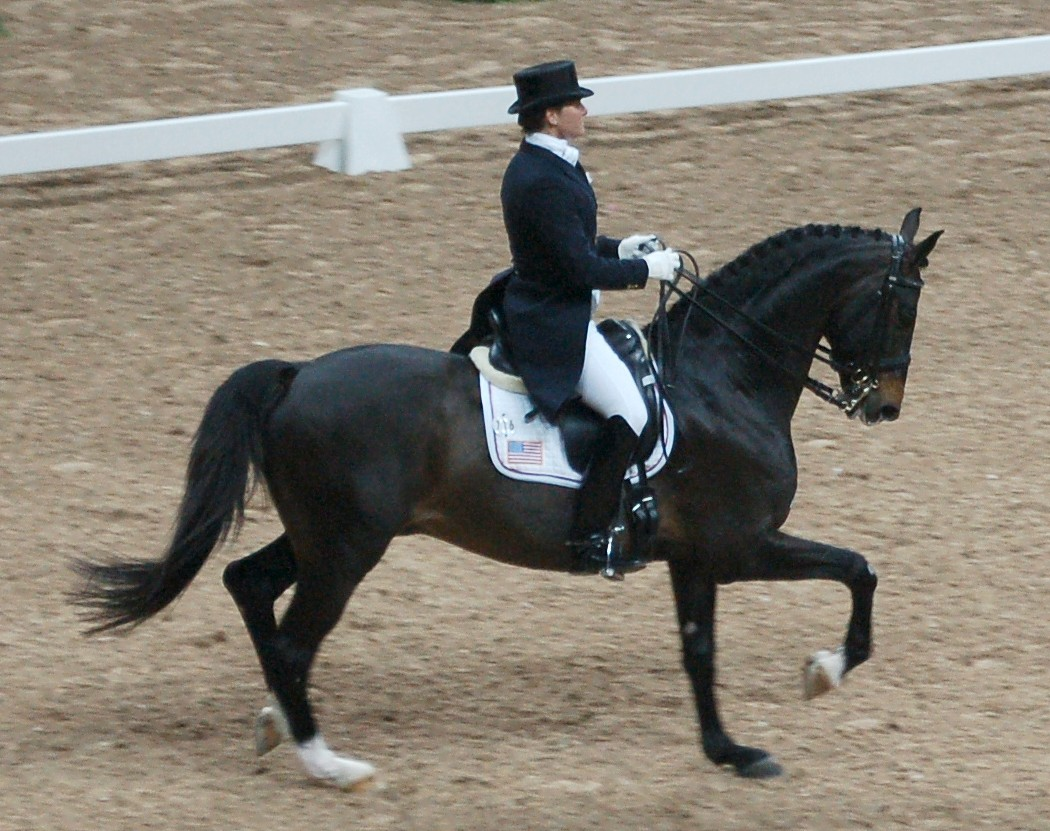

Personal information
- Born: November 25, 1961 (age 64) Tarzana, California
Medal record
Equestrian
Representing the United States
World Championships
Bronze medal – third place	2006 Aachen	Team dressage

Leslie Morse (born November 25, 1961, in Tarzana, California) is an American dressage rider and trainer. She competed at five World Cup finals between 2004 and 2007. In 2006 Morse was part of the American team that won a bronze team medal at the 2006 World Equestrian Games in Aachen. Morse was also traveling reserve for the American team during the 2004 Olympics and the 2008 Olympics.

In 2022 Morse decided to retire from competitions and to focus on training and educating young riders.
