= Kelly Layne =

Australian equestrian

Personal information
- Nationality: Australian
- Born: 14 May 1975 (age 51) Queensland, Australia

Sport
- Country: Australia
- Sport: Equestrian dressage
- Turned pro: 1993

Achievements and titles
- Highest world ranking: 87

Kelly Layne (born 14 May 1975) is an Australian Dressage rider and trainer. She planned on qualifying to represent her country at the 2016 Summer Olympics in Rio de Janeiro. However, Layne was unable to compete in the final qualifying event due to an injury suffered by her horse, Udon P, forcing her to withdraw. While born in Australia, Layne is currently based in Wellington, Florida. Layne also helped found her own riding team, "Dream Team Dressage".

Throughout her career, Layne has scored an average of 67.491 (150 classes) per competition with her highest score being a 76.613. In dressage, above a 60 is considered satisfactory.

In addition to riding Layne also helps to advise clients with finding horses and one of Layne's horses represented Japan in the 2008 Summer Olympics.

== Early life ==
Layne grew up in Queensland, Australia. As the daughter of a Helen Antsee, a Grand Prix rider and FEI judge, Layne was exposed to riding from a young age. Layne had decided that she wanted to be a dressage rider by the time she was 11 years old, a decision influenced by her mother's experience with dressage. By the age of 12, Layne was twice crowned the Under 12 National Dressage Champion. At 16, she finished 9th in the Open Prix St Georges at the Australian National Dressage Championships. By 18, Layne competed in her first Grand Prix, the highest level of competition, riding her mother's horse, Adonis. The same year, Layne became an Australian National Coaching Accreditation Scheme Level 1 Coach in dressage, show jumping and eventing. She attended Marymount College before moving with her parents to the Sunshine Coast. In December 2004, Kelly became a NCAS Level 2 dressage specialist.

== Career ==
Layne has performed and represented Australia at the highest level for over ten years. She competed for Australia in the 2006 World Equestrian Games held in Aachen, Germany with her horse, Amoucher - placing ninth in the competition. Layne has also represented Australia as a Young Rider in New Zealand and Hong Kong. In 2013, Layne competed in and won the Hermes’ Cup for the Small Tour championship at the Tokyo CDI3* (international competition). In 2014, she won the Wellington CDI3* Grand Prix Freestyle.

Leading up to the 2016 Olympics, Layne scored her personal best with Udon-P in at the Grand Prix Special at the Wellington CDI-W in February 2016, placing 3rd with a score of 70.157%.

Layne was chosen to compete in the Olympic Games and would have made her Olympic debut, but had to withdraw from the final qualifying event due to complications stemming from a reoccurring injury with her horse Udon-P. As a result, fellow countrywoman Sue Hearn competed in the qualifying event in her stead, as Layne did not want to jeopardize the team's chances at the Rio Games.

As of March 2017, she is ranked 280th out of 816 dressage riders worldwide with her horse Udon P and ranked 358th with Von Primaire. Layne is coached by previous World Cup Champion and Olympian Ulla Salzburger.

On 24 March 2017, Layne placed Second in the FEI Grand Prix Freestyle CDI3* in Wellington, Florida along with her horse, Udon-P.

Layne was selected for the Tokyo 2020 Olympics and rode Samhitas in the Dressage event. She was not able to progress to the final.

== Honors ==
- Ranked 87th in the world with her horse Amoucheur (2005)
- Member of the Australian team at the 2006 FEI World Equestrian Games (2006)
- Won the Grand Prix Special at the CDN Gold Coast Finale (2011)
- Won the Hermes’ Cup for the Small Tour championship at the Tokyo CDI3* (2013)
- Won the Wellington CDI3* Grand Prix Freestyle (2014)
- Personal Best: Scored a 76.613 with Don Santiago at a First Level Test qualifying for USEF

== Horses ==
- Adonis (1992)
- Abbey Hill (1993)
- Neversfelde Feuer (2007)
- Amoucher (2003-2008)
- Raja (2008-2012)
- Starnberg (2013)
- Don Santiago (2014)
- Don Royal (2012-2014)
- Heineking (2015-2016)
- Furst Amante (2016)
- Von Primaire (2012 – present)
- Udon-P (2013 – present)
- Samhitas

== Personal life ==
Layne's mother started breeding horses for Kelly to ride even before she was even born. Layne came to the United States in 2007 with her husband, an ex F-16 Fighter pilot in the Air Force who works in the aviation industry. She relocated to Wellington, Florida, which is known for as the "dressage capital of the US".

== See also ==
- Dressage World Championship
- Dressage at the Summer Olympics
- Equestrianism
