= Sandy Pflueger =

American equestrian

- Born: Helen Sandy Pflueger; April 14, 1954 (age 71); Hawaii, U.S.
- Other names: Sandy Phillips
- Occupation: Equestrian
- Spouse: Mark Phillips (m. 1997; sep. 2012)
- Children: Stephanie Hosier

Helen Sandy Pflueger (born April 14, 1954) is an American equestrian. She has competed successfully in both eventing and dressage, finishing second at the Badminton Horse Trials in 1981 and competing on the United States Dressage Team at the 1984 Los Angeles Olympics. She competed under the British flag at the World Equestrian Games in Rome 1998 and Aachen in 2006 and the European Championships in Arnheim 1998.

She is the daughter of Nancy and James Pflueger, a Kauai landowner, auto dealer, philanthropist and self-made millionaire. On February 1, 1997, Sandy Pflueger married British Olympian and coach of the American Eventing team, Captain Mark Phillips, whose first wife was Princess Anne, the daughter of Queen Elizabeth II. Pflueger coached the US eventing team in dressage, alongside her husband. The couple lived in England with their daughter, Stephanie (b. October 2, 1997).

Pflueger was the co-owner of Hawaii's Ka Loko Dam, which collapsed after heavy rain on March 14, 2006, killing seven people. Unlicensed grading operations had been carried out, with the knowledge of the local authorities, who failed to enforce a stop-work order.

It emerged in May 2012 that Capt. Phillips had left Pflueger and intended to divorce her, having become involved with another woman, Lauren Hough.

In equestrian sport Sandy is still active as an FEI Level 3 international jury member in dressage and FEI Level 4 international jury member in eventing. She also coaches several riders and gives clinics worldwide. She was a member of the jury during the 2016 Summer Olympics in Eventing. Sandy was a ground jury president at the 2025 European Eventing Championships
