= Tatiana Miloserdova =

Russian equestrian

Personal information
- Nationality: Italian, Russian
- Born: 9 January 1960 (age 65); Moscow, Russia

Sport
- Sport: Equestrian

Tatiana Miloserdova (born 9 January 1960) is a Russian-born equestrian, who has been representing Italy since 2019. She competed in the individual dressage event at the 2008 Summer Olympics.
