= Dominique d'Esmé =

French equestrian

Personal information
- Nationality: French
- Born: 26 December 1945 (age 80) Rennes, France

Sport
- Sport: Equestrian
Medal record
Equestrian
Representing France
European Championships
Bronze medal – third place	1995 Mondorf	Team dressage

Dominique d'Esmé (born 26 December 1945) is a French equestrian. She competed at five Olympic Games.
