= Laurens van Lieren =

Dutch dressage rider (born 1981)

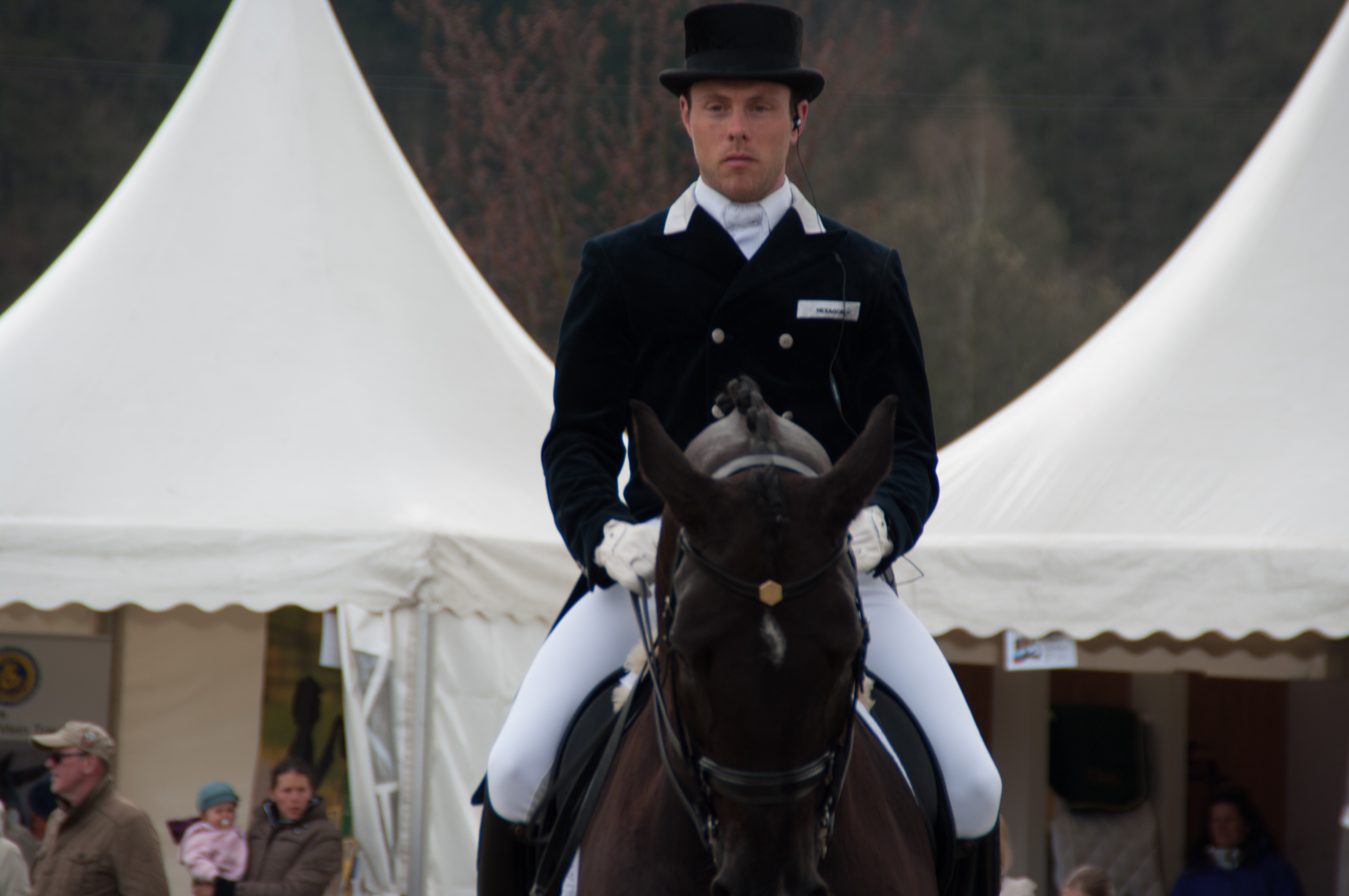
- Laurens van Lieren in 2013

Personal information
- Nationality: Dutch
- Born: 21 December 1981 (age 44) Goes, Netherlands
- Website: www.laurensvanlieren.nl

Sport
- Country: Netherlands
- Sport: Equestrian
Medal record
Equestrian
Representing the Netherlands
World Equestrian Games
Silver medal – second place	2006 Aachen	Team dressage
European Championships
Gold medal – first place	2007 La Mandria	Team dressage
Silver medal – second place	2005 Hagen	Team dressage

Laurens van Lieren (born 21 December 1981) is a Dutch dressage rider who competed at the 2005 and 2007 European Championships where he won team silver and gold. He competed also at the World Equestrian Games in Aachen 2006 where he won team silver with his horse Hexagon's Ollright.

He is well known as a sport commentator at the NOS and sport director at CHIO Rotterdam.
