= Hubertus Schmidt =

German equestrian

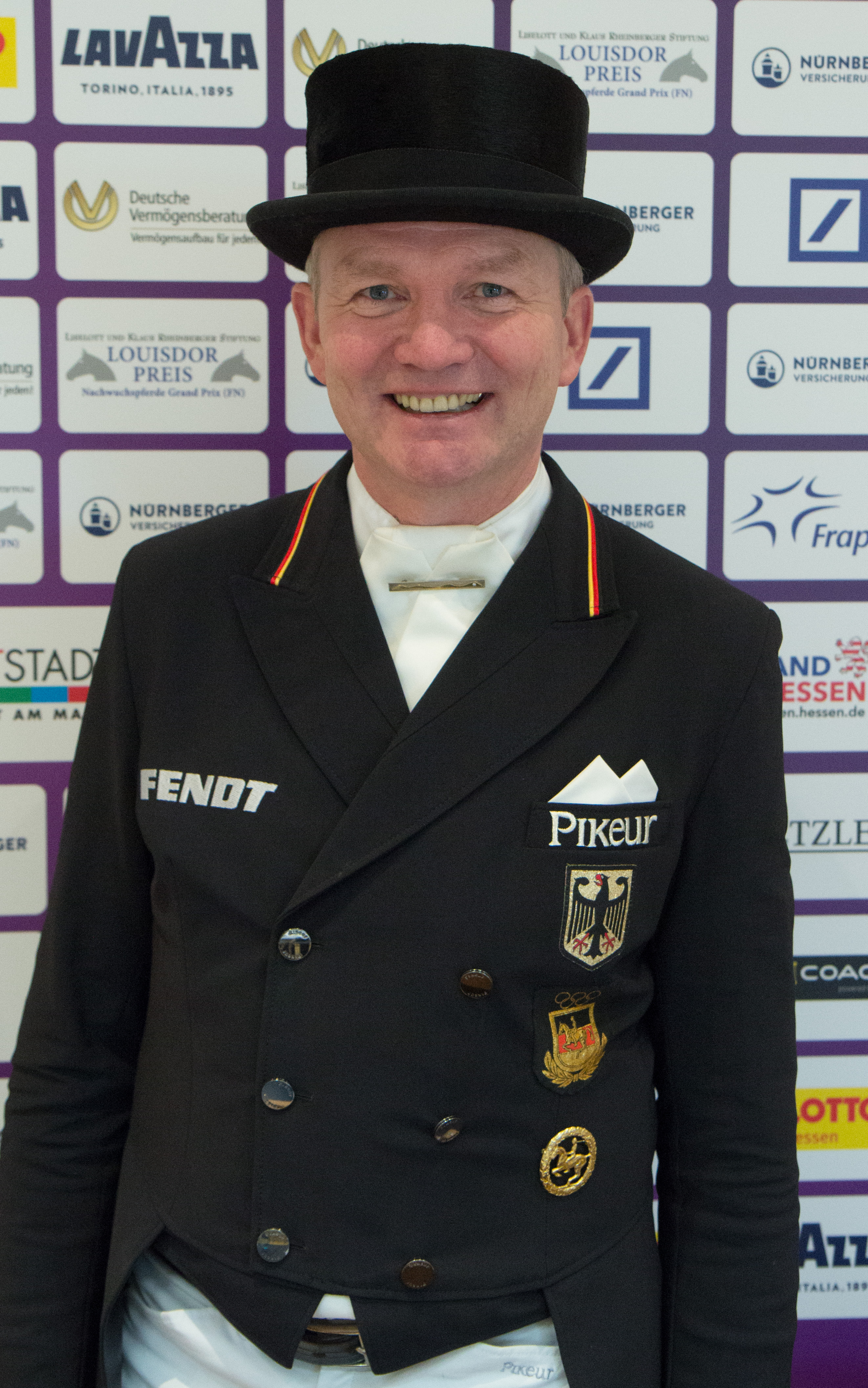
- Schmidt in 2017

Medal record

Equestrian

Representing Germany

Olympic Games
Gold medal – first place	2004 Athens	Team dressage

World Championships
Gold medal – first place	2006 Aachen	Team dressage

European Championships
Gold medal – first place	2005 Hagen	Team dressage
Silver medal – second place	2005 Hagen	Individual dressage

Hubertus Schmidt (born 8 October 1959) is a German equestrian and Olympic champion. He won a gold medal in team dressage at the 2004 Summer Olympics in Athens with the team from Germany.

Hubertus was a mainstay of the German team with his famous mare Wansuela Suerte, and he has trained many other horses to Grand Prix. He is currently (2010) the coach for the Swedish team. He teaches at Fleyenhof stable in Germany.
