= Christian Pläge =

Swiss equestrian

Personal information
- Nationality: Swiss
- Born: 1 November 1956 (age 68); Meerbusch, Germany

Sport
- Sport: Equestrian

Christian Pläge (born 1 November 1956) is a Swiss equestrian. He competed in two events at the 2004 Summer Olympics. Christian is married to Swiss Grand Prix rider Birgit Wientzek Pläge.
