= Constance Menard =

French dressage rider

Constance Menard
Country:	France
Residence:	Saumur, France
Height:	1.67 m (5 ft 6 in)
Turned pro:	1987

Constance Menard (born 17 May 1968) is a French professional dressage rider and equestrienne. She started training with Michel Autran from the Cadre Noir in 2003.

She has been placed in more than 40 international Grand Prix (dressage), and is a member of the French team.

== Career ==
The daughter of Jacques Menard, a professional French dressage rider, Constance Menard started her own career twenty years ago, choosing dressage as her forte after having practiced all horse riding disciplines.

Vanini and Constance at Neunmunster CDIW in 2002

Constance Menard has been a Grand Prix rider since 2001. She is a member of the French national team. For several years Constance maintained her own stables near Paris, before qualifying as riding instructor in 2005 after graduating from the national riding school at Saumur. She now lives in Saumur, France, where she trains daily with her coach, Lt. Col. Michel Autran, ecuyer (riding master) of the Cadre Noir.

On August 9, 2005, Menard suffered a near-fatal accident when a bale of hay weighing almost 300 kilograms (660 lb) fell on her. Both collarbones and three vertebrae were broken, and her sternum was bruised.

Constance Menard is also an instructor, teaching students at riding schools all over Europe, including Geneva, Brussels, and Toulouse. She judges at dressage competitions around France.

== Major events ==
Constance with the Dutch Harness Horse Lianca at the European Championship at Hagen in 2005

In 1986, Menard won her first Junior and Senior Championships in Normandy. In 1992, she was the French Champion. In 2004, she won the Bushmills National Grand Prix. In 2005, Menard won the Grand Prix Special of Vejer and Lipica, and participated in the European championship at Hagen, where she helped her team to seventh place. In March 2006, she won the Marc-en-Baroeul (France) National Grand Prix. In 2008, she rode at the Beijing Olympic Games.
