= Anky van Grunsven =

Dutch equestrian

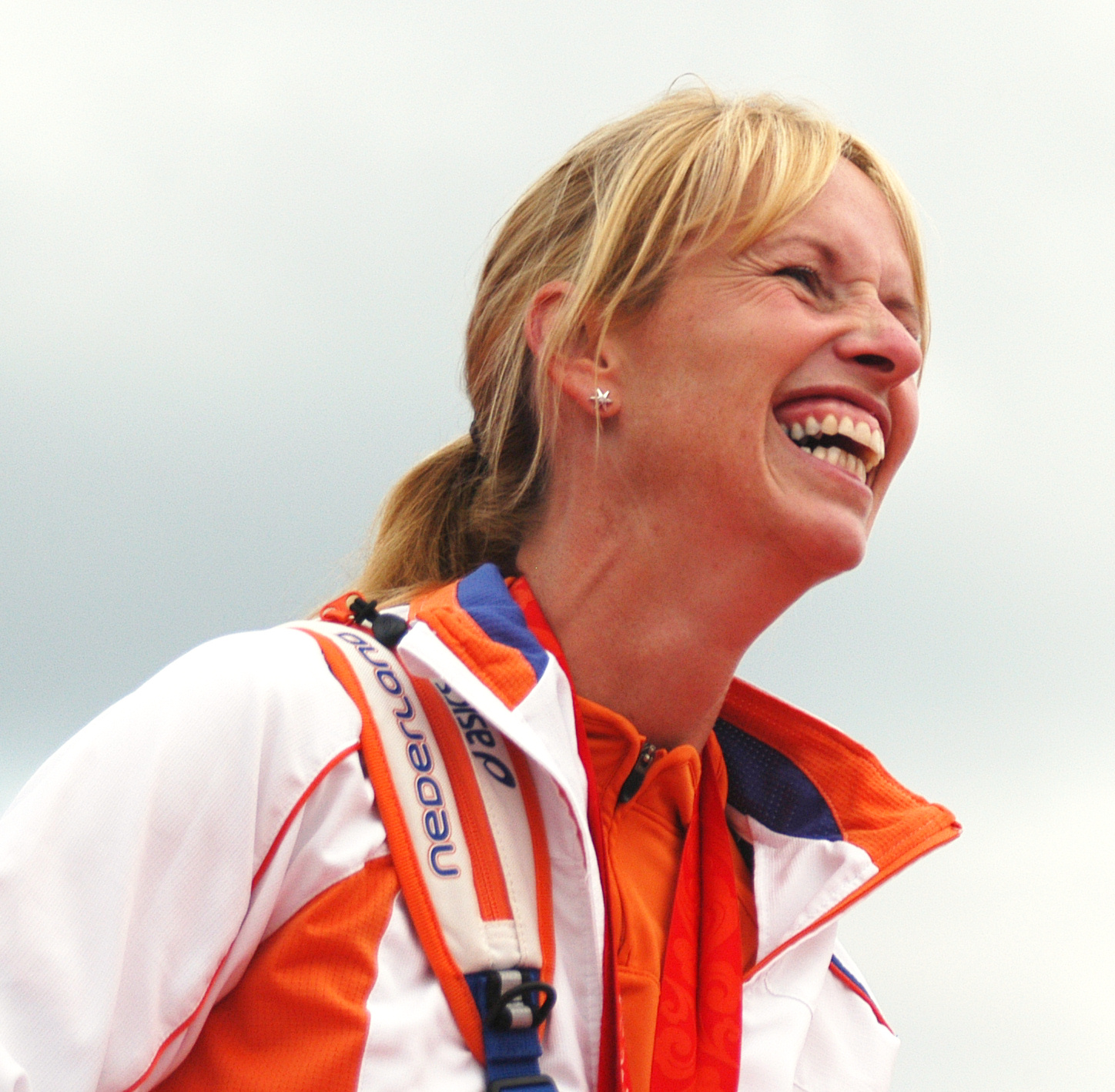

Medal record

Equestrian

Representing the Netherlands

Olympic Games
Gold medal – first place	2000 Sydney	Individual dressage
Gold medal – first place	2004 Athens	Individual dressage
Gold medal – first place	2008 Beijing	Individual dressage
Silver medal – second place	1992 Barcelona	Team dressage
Silver medal – second place	1996 Atlanta	Individual dressage
Silver medal – second place	1996 Atlanta	Team dressage
Silver medal – second place	2000 Sydney	Team dressage
Silver medal – second place	2008 Beijing	Team dressage
Bronze medal – third place	2012 London	Team dressage

World Championships
Gold medal – first place	1994 The Hague	Freestyle dressage
Gold medal – first place	2006 Aachen	Freestyle dressage
Silver medal – second place	1994 The Hague	Team dressage
Silver medal – second place	1998 Rome	Individual dressage
Silver medal – second place	1998 Rome	Team dressage
Silver medal – second place	2006 Aachen	Special dressage
Silver medal – second place	2006 Aachen	Team dressage

European Championships
Gold medal – first place	1999 Arnhem	Individual dressage
Gold medal – first place	2005 Hagen	Individual dressage
Gold medal – first place	2007 La Mandria	Special dressage
Gold medal – first place	2007 La Mandria	Team dressage
Gold medal – first place	2009 Windsor	Team dressage
Silver medal – second place	1995 Mondorf	Individual dressage
Silver medal – second place	1995 Mondorf	Team dressage
Silver medal – second place	1997 Verden	Individual dressage
Silver medal – second place	1997 Verden	Team dressage
Silver medal – second place	1999 Arnhem	Team dressage
Silver medal – second place	2001 Verden	Team dressage
Silver medal – second place	2005 Hagen	Team dressage
Silver medal – second place	2007 La Mandria	Freestyle dressage
Bronze medal – third place	1991 Donaueschingen	Team dressage
Bronze medal – third place	2009 Windsor	Freestyle dressage
Bronze medal – third place	2015 Aachen	Team reining

World Cup
Gold medal – first place	1995 Los Angeles	Individual dressage
Gold medal – first place	1996 Göteborg	Individual dressage
Gold medal – first place	1997 Den Bosch	Individual dressage
Gold medal – first place	1999 Dortmund	Individual dressage
Gold medal – first place	2000 Den Bosch	Individual dressage
Gold medal – first place	2004 Düsseldorf	Individual dressage
Gold medal – first place	2005 Las Vegas	Individual dressage
Gold medal – first place	2006 Amsterdam	Individual dressage
Gold medal – first place	2008 Den Bosch	Individual dressage
Silver medal – second place	1998 Göteborg	Individual dressage
Bronze medal – third place	2009 Las Vegas	Individual dressage

Theodora Elisabeth Gerarda "Anky" van Grunsven (born 2 January 1968) is a Dutch dressage champion who is the only rider to record three successive Olympic wins in the same event. Along with her Olympic successes, she has won numerous medals at the World Equestrian Games (WEG), and is the only rider to have competed at every WEG since they began in 1990. Between 1990 and 2006, she competed at the Games in dressage, but in 2010 she was named as part of the Dutch reining team, marking a major change in discipline.

In addition to her Olympic and World Equestrian Games successes, van Grunsven holds the record for the most wins at the Dressage World Cup, winning the event nine times between 1995 and 2008. She has also competed numerous times at the European Dressage Championships, winning seven individual medals and eight team medals between 1991 and 2009. Although van Grunsven has ridden many horses over her career, she won the majority of her top events on two horses: Bonfire and Salinero. Bonfire, upon whom she had many of her early successes, was retired in 2002. Salinero quickly took over as van Grunsven's top horse, and remained in that position until his retirement in 2013, after making a major comeback to compete in the 2012 Olympic Games. Van Grunsven has been closely linked with the controversial training method rollkur, although she has moved to distance herself from the practice after it was banned from international competition.

== Personal life ==
Van Grunsven was born in Erp, North Brabant. She began training in dressage at the age of 12, after her horse Prisco (who she would later ride at the Olympics and World Equestrian Games) performed poorly in show jumping.

Van Grunsven is married to Dutch national equestrian coach Sjef Janssen, with whom she has two children. She was pregnant with her first child, Yannick, when she competed at the 2004 Olympic Games, and gave birth in November of that year. Van Grunsven and Janssen married in Las Vegas in late 2005, and in March 2007 had her second child, Ava Eden.

In 1999, van Grunsven, "frustrated by the lack of fashion in the equestrian world", developed a line of equestrian clothing, now sold internationally.

== Competitive career ==
=== Olympics and World Equestrian Games ===
Van Grunsven holds the record for winning the most Olympic medals by an equestrian, with nine medals, and is the only person to have won any equestrian event in three successive Olympics. She is also the only person to compete at seven successive Olympics in dressage. She has competed in every Olympic Games between 1988 and 2012, winning a total of three gold medals, five silvers and one bronze. At the 1988 Summer Olympics, riding Prisco, she was eliminated in the qualifying rounds of the individual dressage, and was the lowest-scoring member of the fifth-place Dutch team, meaning her score was not used to determine the team's standing. At the 1992 Summer Olympics, her performance improved, and riding Bonfire she took fourth individually and won her first silver medal in the team competition. At the 1996 Games, again riding Bonfire, she won double silver in the individual and team dressage competitions.

With her last Olympic ride on Bonfire, at the 2000 Summer Olympics, she won her first gold in the individual competition, while helping the Dutch team to their third consecutive silver. In 2004 in Athens, on her new mount, Salinero, she won her second gold in individual competition, while the Dutch team came in fourth. The 2008 Olympic Games, again riding Salinero, brought her her third consecutive individual gold, while the Dutch team returned to the medal podium with a silver. Riding Salinero in 2012 in London, van Grunsven slipped to sixth place individually, but helped the Dutch team to her first bronze medal. Van Grunsven was originally not expected to compete in the 2012 Olympics, as the horse she was riding at the beginning of 2012, IPS Upido, was injured. However, in April, she announced that she planned to compete for a spot on the Dutch Olympic team with the then-18-year-old Salinero, who had staged what the media called a "comeback" after previous injuries.

Along with her Olympic successes, van Grunsven has also won numerous medals at the World Equestrian Games. After competing in the 2010 World Equestrian Games, she became the only equestrian to have competed in every World Equestrian Games, which have been held every four years since 1990, and which include three sections of dressage competition, two individual and one team. At the 1990 World Equestrian Games, riding Prisco, she finished 23rd individually. Van Grunsven rode Bonfire at the 1994 and 1998 World Equestrian Games, winning individual gold and team silver at the first and double silver (one individual and one team) at the second. She was unhappy with the judging at the 1998 Games, held in Rome, and said that she "thought [she] would quit dressage", despite her high finish placement.

At the 2002 World Equestrian Games, riding Krack C, she finished 11th individually and rode to 5th place with the Dutch team. Her best finish was at the 2006 Games, riding Salinero, where she won an individual gold and two silvers, one individually and one team. At the 2010 Games, after her top horse Salinero was injured and second-best horse Painted Black was sold, she competed as part of the Dutch reining team, marking a major change in discipline. Riding Whizashiningwalla BB, she was eliminated in the qualifying rounds. At the Games, she also performed a reining demonstration at the presentation of the team dressage medal and participated in an exhibition of freestyle reining. Van Grunsven began riding reining horses around 2000, but only became a serious competitor in the sport after the 2008 Olympics. She won a team bronze in the 2015 European reining championships.

=== Other competition ===
Van Grunsven has won the Dressage World Cup nine times, in 1995, 1996, 1997, 1999, 2000, 2004, 2005, 2006 and 2008. She took second in 1998 and third in 2009. The World Cup features freestyle dressage (also called Kur Grand Prix), and her record number of wins has won van Grunsven the nickname "Queen of the Kur". She has also collected five gold medals, eight silver and two bronze at the European Dressage Championships. At the bi-annual European Championships, there is one team competition and three individual events: Individual Dressage, Kur Grand Prix and Special Grand Prix. Van Grunsven took first in the Individual Dressage portion in 1999 and 2005, and second in 1995 and 1997. In the Kur competition, she took first in 2007 and third in 2009. The Special Grand Prix has historically been her weakest event, only taking second in 2007. She has taken the greatest number of medals in the team competition, with the Dutch team taking first in 2007 and 2009; second in 1995, 1997, 1999, 2001 and 2005; and third in 1991.

In 2002, Bonfire was retired, after a nine-year international career. The pair's gold medal-winning freestyle dressage performance at the 1994 World Equestrian Games marked the first the time event had been held at the Games, and "changed the world of dressage forever", according to fellow Olympic gold medalist Carl Hester. A statue was erected in Erp to mark Bonfire's achievements. In October 2013, he was euthanized following illness. After Bonfire's retirement, Van Grunsven stated that she never thought she would find another horse as good as he was; however, his successor Salinero proved to be even more successful. In March 2013, Salinero was retired. Van Grunsven and Salinero have been called the "pioneers of the modern freestyle test", and were the first pair to have music written specifically for their performances. A horse known for his power and ability, he was also sensitive and, early in his career, prone to becoming tense, making him a more difficult horse to ride. Despite this, he was a star of the dressage world, winning numerous international competitions.

In January 2003, van Grunsven sustained a fracture of a bone in her upper leg in a fall from a horse in training, and required surgery. A metal plate was embedded in her leg to immobilize the bone during the healing process, and van Grunsven recovered, winning the 2003 Dutch Dressage Championships in June. In September, she underwent a second surgery to have the plate removed. In 2004, she became the first Dutch rider to win the CHIO Aachen dressage competition, a top international competition.

== International and championship results ==
Results
Year	Event	Horse	Score	Placing	Notes
1988	Olympic Games	Prisco		5th	Team
1988	Olympic Games	Prisco		36th	Individual
1989	World Cup Final	Prisco		7th	
1989	European Championships	Prisco		5th	Team
1989	European Championships	Prisco		22nd	Individual
1990	World Equestrian Games	Prisco		8th	Team
1990	World Equestrian Games	Prisco		23rd	Individual
1991	European Championships	Bonfire		3rd place, bronze medalist(s)	Team
1991	European Championships	Bonfire		5th	Individual
1992	Olympic Games	Bonfire		2nd place, silver medalist(s)	Team
1992	Olympic Games	Bonfire		4th	Individual
1994	World Equestrian Games	Bonfire		1st place, gold medalist(s)	Individual
1996	Olympic Games	Bonfire		2nd place, silver medalist(s)	Team
1996	Olympic Games	Bonfire		2nd place, silver medalist(s)	Individual
1997	World Cup Final	Bonfire		1st place, gold medalist(s)	
1998	World Equestrian Games	Bonfire		2nd place, silver medalist(s)	Team
1998	World Equestrian Games	Bonfire		2nd place, silver medalist(s)	Individual
1999	European Championships	Bonfire		2nd place, silver medalist(s)	Team
1999	European Championships	Bonfire		1st place, gold medalist(s)	Individual
2000	World Cup Final	Bonfire		1st place, gold medalist(s)	
2000	Olympic Games	Bonfire		2nd place, silver medalist(s)	Team
2000	Olympic Games	Bonfire		1st place, gold medalist(s)	Individual
2001	European Championships	Idool		2nd place, silver medalist(s)	Team
2001	European Championships	Idool		17th	Individual
2002	World Equestrian Games	Krack C		5th	Team
2002	World Equestrian Games	Krack C		11th	Individual
2004	World Cup Final	Salinero		1st place, gold medalist(s)	
2004	Olympic Games	Salinero		4th	Team
2004	Olympic Games	Salinero		1st place, gold medalist(s)	Individual
2005	World Cup Final	Salinero		1st place, gold medalist(s)	
2005	European Championships	Salinero		2nd place, silver medalist(s)	Team
2005	European Championships	Salinero		1st place, gold medalist(s)	Individual
2006	World Cup Final	Salinero		1st place, gold medalist(s)	
2006	World Equestrian Games	Salinero		2nd place, silver medalist(s)	Team
2006	World Equestrian Games	Salinero		2nd place, silver medalist(s)	Individual Special
2006	World Equestrian Games	Salinero		1st place, gold medalist(s)	Individual Freestyle
2007	European Championships	Salinero	77.458%	1st place, gold medalist(s)	Team
2007	European Championships	Salinero	77.480%	2nd place, silver medalist(s)	Individual Special
2007	European Championships	Salinero	85.800%	1st place, gold medalist(s)	Individual Freestyle
2008	World Cup Final	Salinero	85.200%	1st place, gold medalist(s)	
2008	Olympic Games	Salinero	74.750%	2nd place, silver medalist(s)	Team
2008	Olympic Games	Salinero	82.400%	1st place, gold medalist(s)	Individual
2009	World Cup Final	Painted Black	82.150%	3rd place, bronze medalist(s)	
2009	European Championships	Salinero	73.827%	1st place, gold medalist(s)	Team
2009	European Championships	Salinero	77.917%	4th	Individual Special
2009	European Championships	Salinero	87.250%	3rd place, bronze medalist(s)	Individual Freestyle
2012	Olympic Games	Salinero	73.343%	3rd place, bronze medalist(s)	Team
2012	Olympic Games	Salinero	82.000%	6th	Individual
2015	European Reining Championships	Whizashiningwalla BB	207.00	3rd place, bronze medalist(s)	Team

== Rollkur ==
Van Grunsven was closely linked with the controversial training method rollkur, and advocated use of the method as recently as 2007. She has since moved to distance herself with the method since the International Federation for Equestrian Sports (FEI) declared in February 2010 that this method "is seen as an aggressive way of a deep moving horse. This is forbidden as well as any head-neck position which is obtained in an aggressive way."

In a lawsuit announced on 24 August 2010, van Grunsven claimed to have been defamed by journalist Astrid Appels on the website eurodressage.com. A release posted on that website announcing the lawsuit reported that "according to Anky, images of her horses can not be connected to the controversial rollkur training method." The lawsuit was scheduled to begin 8 September 2010 in 's-Hertogenbosch but van Grunsven withdrew the case.

== See also ==
- List of multiple Olympic gold medalists in one event
- List of multiple Summer Olympic medalists
- List of athletes with the most appearances at Olympic Games

Awards
Preceded by Leontien van Moorsel	Dutch Sportswoman of the Year; 1994	Succeeded by Angelique Seriese
Olympic Games
Preceded by Carina Benninga	Flagbearer for Netherlands; Atlanta 1996	Succeeded by Nico Rienks
