= Silvia Iklé =

Swiss equestrian

Personal information
- Nationality: Swiss
- Born: 12 January 1949 (age 77) St. Gallen, Switzerland

Sport
- Sport: Equestrian
Medal record
Equestrian
Representing Switzerland
World Championships
Bronze medal – third place	1990 Stockholm	Team dressage

Silvia Iklé (born 12 January 1949) is a Swiss equestrian. She competed in two events at the 2004 Summer Olympics.
