= Nina Stadlinger =

Austrian equestrian

Personal information
- Nationality: Austrian
- Born: 22 April 1980 (age 44); Salzburg, Austria

Sport
- Sport: Equestrian

Nina Stadlinger (born 22 April 1980) is an Austrian equestrian. She competed in two events at the 2004 Summer Olympics.
