= Salinero =

Horse

Olympic medal record

Equestrian
Gold medal – first place	2004 Athens	Individual dressage
Gold medal – first place	2008 Beijing	Individual dressage
Silver medal – second place	2008 Beijing	Team dressage
Bronze medal – third place	2012 London	Team dressage

IPS Salinero (formerly Keltec Salinero and Gestion Salinero; 6 May 1994 – December 2022) was a horse ridden by the Dutch equestrian Anky van Grunsven in the sport of dressage.

Sjef Janssen originally purchased the horse for American Tess Guilder. After it performed well at the lower levels, Sjef and his wife Anky purchased him.

Anky van Grunsven achieved success with Salinero, winning the individual gold medal at the 2004 and 2008 Olympic Games and additional international Grand Prix. On Salinero, she won the title at Aachen in 2004, making her the first Dutch rider to win there.

In late 2008, Salinero competed under the name "IPS Salinero", changed from the former Gestion Salinero and Keltec Salinero.

At age 16 (2010), Salinero retired from shows, however an injury to van Grunsven's IPS Upido caused her to bring Salinero back for the 2012 Olympics. Salinero's return was at CDIO Saumur (26–29 April 2012), where the combination placed second.

On 24 June 2012, Salinero and Anky van Grunsven were officially added to the 2012 Dutch Olympic Dressage Team along with Adelinde Cornelissen (Parzival) and Edward Gal (Undercover). Van Grunsven and Salinero turned in a performance that helped to capture the team bronze medal for the Netherlands on 2 August 2012, even though Van Grunsven's husband and national team coach, Sjef Janssen, had gotten violently ill the previous night. Salinero's last ride came at the Olympic Individual Dressage Competition on 9 August 2012. The 18-year-old horse posted a score of 82.000%, which earned sixth place overall. Salinero retired to pasture at van Grunsven's residence in the Netherlands.

Salinero died in December 2022, at the age of 28.

== Results ==
- 2012 Olympic Games London (GBR) : GPSpecial 82.000%
- 2012 Olympic Games London (GBR) : GPKür 73.343% (Team Bronze)
- 2008 Olympic Games Beijing (CHN) : GPKür 82.500% (Individual Gold)
- 2006 WEG Aachen : GPKür 86.10% (1st place), GP 77.80% (2nd place)
- 2006 CHIO Rotterdam: GP 81.33% (World Record)
- 2006 CDI-W Final Amsterdam (NED): 78.250% (1st place)
- 2006 CDI 3*-W 's-Hertogenbosch (NED) GPKür 87.925% (world record), GP 77.375% (1st place)
- 2005 CDI-W Mechelen: (BEL) GPKür 83.600%, GP 76.126% (1st place)
- 2005 CDI-W London-Olympia (GBR): GPKür 82.850%, GP 76.083% (1st place)
- 2005 CDI 3*-W Maastricht (NED): GPKür 82.375%, GP 78.000% (1st place)
- 2005 CDIO 3* Aachen (GER): GPKür / CDIO 81.525%, GPSpecial / CDIO 70.960%, GP / CDIO 74.500%
- 2005 CH-EU-D Hagen (GER): GPKür 83.000%, GPSpecial 76.160%, GP 77.417% (1st place)
- 2005 CDI 3* Gelderland (NED): GPSpecial 78.640%, GP 78.212% (1st place)
- 2005 CDI-W Final Las Vegas (USA): GPKür 86.725%, GP 78.000%
- 2005 CDI-W Düsseldorf (GER): GP 77.416%, GPKür 84.425% (1st place)
- 2005 CDI 3*-W 's-Hertogenbosch (NED): GP 75.750%, GPKür 83.600% (1st place)
- 2004 Olympic Games Athens (GRE): GPKür 85.825%, GPSpecial 77.800%, GP 74.208% (Individual Gold)
- 2004 CDIO Aachen (GER): GPKür 83.650%, GPSpecial 77.160%, GP 75.416% (1st place)
- 2004 CDI-W Final Düsseldorf (GER): GP 75.791%, GPKür 83.450% (1st place)
- 2004 CDI-W 's-Hertogenbosh (NED): GP 75.208%, GPKür 81.400% (1st place)
- 2004 CDI-W Amsterdam (NED): GP 74.750%, GPKür 80.450% (1st place)
- 2003 CDI-W Mechelen (BEL): GP 72.125%, GPKür 80.825% (1st place)
- 2003 CDI-W Maastricht (NED): GP 70.083%, GPKür 79.975%

== See also ==
- Bonfire (horse)
- Upido
