= 2006 FEI World Equestrian Games =

International equestrian competition

- Host city: Aachen, Germany
- Nations: 59
- Athletes: 767
- Events: 16 in 7 disciplines
- Opening: 20 August 2006
- Closing: 3 September 2006
- Website: www.aachen2006.de

The 2006 FEI World Equestrian Games were held in Aachen, Germany from 20 August to 3 September 2006. They were the 5th edition of the games which are held every four years and run by the FEI. It was held in the Soers, a district of Aachen. The main stadium of this event was the Hauptstadion.

== Host selection ==
On 18 September 2002 in Jerez de la Frontera, Spain, the FEI awarded the 2006 Games to Aachen. The only other host city applicant was Lexington, Kentucky, United States (which was later awarded the following edition of the Games in 2010).

== Events ==
16 events in 7 disciplines were held in Aachen.

Dressage	Driving	Endurance	Eventing	Jumping	Reining	Vaulting
Individual Freestyle	Individual	Individual	Individual	Individual	Individual	Individual Female
Individual Special	Individual	Individual	Individual	Individual	Individual	Individual Male
Team	Team	Team	Team	Team	Team	Team

== Participating nations ==
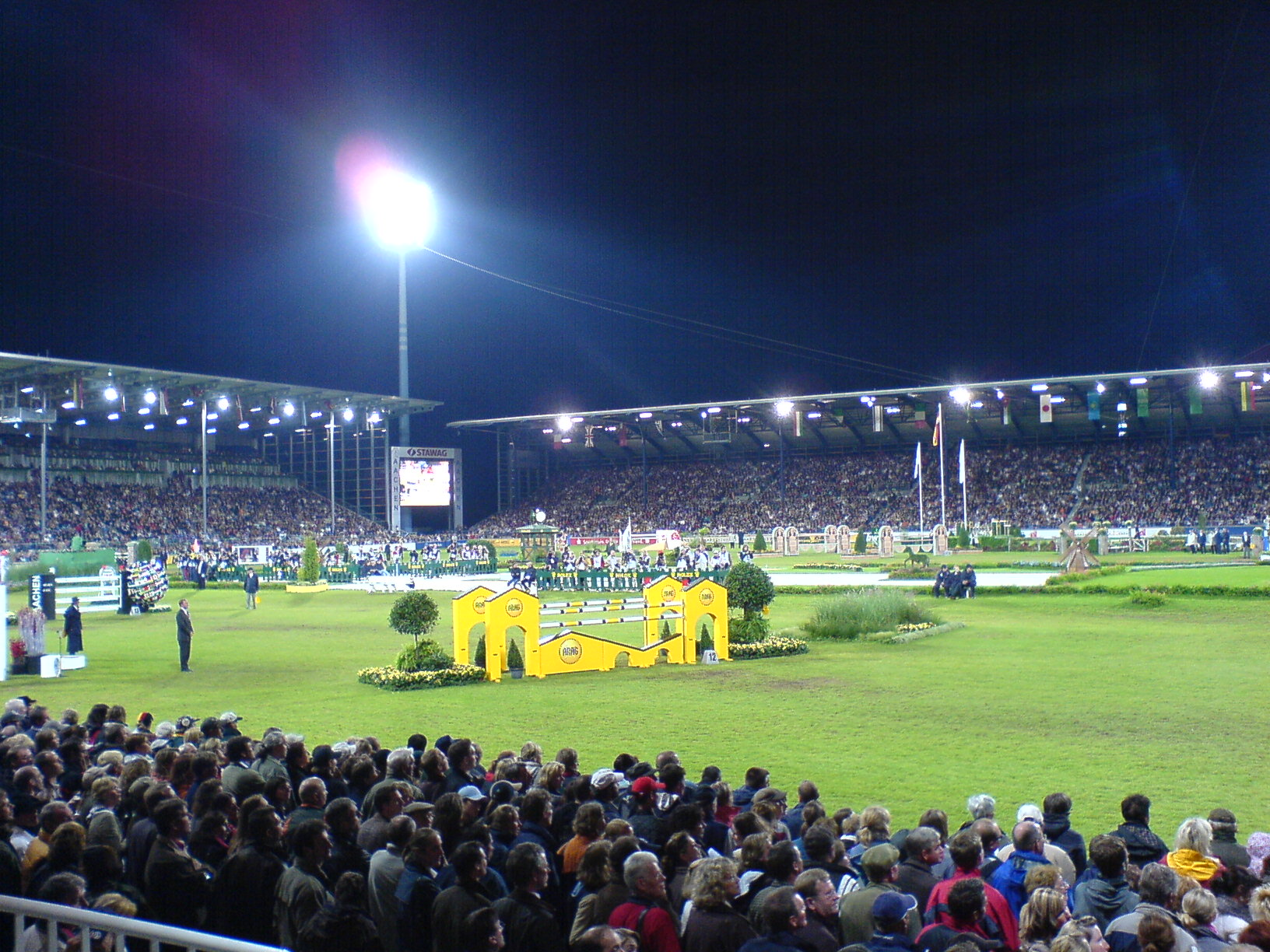
Main Stadium, Mercedes-Benz-Prize, Aachen, Germany

59 National Equestrian Federations sent athletes to the Aachen games.

- Antigua and Barbuda
- Argentina
- Australia
- Austria
- Bahrain
- Belarus
- Belgium
- Brazil
- Bulgaria
- Canada
- Chile
- Colombia
- Croatia
- Czech Republic
- Denmark
- Dominican Republic
- Egypt
- El Salvador
- Estonia
- Finland
- France
- (Georgia (country)) Georgia
- Germany
- (United Kingdom) Great Britain
- Greece
- Hungary
- (Republic of Ireland) Ireland
- Israel
- Italy
- Jamaica
- Japan
- Jordan
- Libya
- Lithuania
- Luxembourg
- Malaysia
- Mexico
- Namibia
- Netherlands
- Netherlands Antilles
- New Zealand
- Norway
- Oman
- Poland
- Portugal
- Qatar
- Russia
- Saudi Arabia
- Slovakia
- Slovenia
- South Africa
- Spain
- Sweden
- Switzerland
- Syria
- Ukraine
- United Arab Emirates
- United States
- Venezuela

== Medal summary ==
=== Medalists ===
Event	Gold	Silver	Bronze
Individual special dressage	Isabell Werth on Satchmo; Germany	Anky van Grunsven on Salinero; Netherlands	Andreas Helgstrand on Blue Hors Matine; Denmark
Individual freestyle dressage	Anky van Grunsven on Salinero; Netherlands	Andreas Helgstrand on Blue Hors Matine; Denmark	Isabell Werth on Satchmo; Germany
Team dressage	Germany (GER); Hubertus Schmidt on Wansuela Suerte; Heike Kemmer on Bonaparte; Nadine Capellmann on Elvis VA; Isabell Werth on Satchmo	Netherlands (NED); Laurens van Lieren on Hexagon's Ollright; Imke Schellekens-Bartels on Sunrise; Anky van Grunsven on Salinero; Edward Gal on Lingh	United States (USA); Leslie Morse on Tip Top; Guenter Seidel on Aragon; Steffen Peters on Floriano; Debbie McDonald on Brentina
Individual driving	Felix-Marie Brasseur; Belgium	Ijsbrand Chardon; Netherlands	Christoph Sandmann; Germany
Team driving	Germany (GER); Christoph Sandmann; Michael Freund; Rainer Duen	Belgium (BEL); Felix-Marie Brasseur; Gert Schrijvers; Geert de Brauwer	Netherlands (NED); Ijsbrand Chardon; Theo Timmerman; Koos de Ronde
Individual endurance	Miguel Vila Ubach on Hungares; Spain	Virginie Atger on Kangoo d'Aurabelle; France	Elodie Le Labourier on Sangho'Limousian; France
Team endurance	France (FRA); Virginie Atger on Kangoo d'Aurabelle; Philippe Benoit on Akim Du Boulve; Pascale Dietsch on Hifrane Du Barthas	Switzerland (SUI); Urs Wenger on Zialka; Anna Lena Wagner on Tessa IV; Nora Wagner on Temir	Portugal (POR); Joao Raposo on Sultao; Ana Margarida Costa on Gozlane Du Somail; Ana Barbas on Piperino
Individual eventing	Zara Phillips on Toytown; Great Britain	Clayton Fredericks on Ben Along Time; Australia	Amy Tryon on Poggio II; United States
Team eventing	Germany (GER); Frank Ostholt on Air Jordan; Hinrich Romeike on Marius; Bettina Hoy on Ringwood Cockatoo; Ingrid Klimke on Sleep Late	Great Britain (GBR); Zara Phillips on Toytown; Daisy Dick on Spring Along; William Fox-Pitt on Tamarillo; Mary King on Call Again Cavalier	Australia (AUS); Clayton Fredericks on Ben Along Time; Megan Jones on Kirby Park Irish Jester; Andrew Hoy on Master Monarch; Sonja Johnson on Ringwood Jaguar
Individual jumping	Jos Lansink on Cavalor Cumano; Belgium	Beezie Madden on Authentic; United States	Meredith Michaels-Beerbaum on Shutterfly; Germany
Team jumping	Netherlands (NED); Gerco Schröder on Eurocommerce; Albert Zoer on Okidoki; Jeroen Dubbeldam on BMC Up and Down; Piet Raijmakers on Van Schijndel's	United States (USA); Beezie Madden on Authentic; McLain Ward on Sapphire; Laura Kraut on Miss Independent; Margie Goldstein-Engle on Quervo Gold	Germany (GER); Ludger Beerbaum on L'Espoir; Marcus Ehning on Noltes Kuchengirl; Meredith Michaels-Beerbaum on Shutterfly; Christian Ahlmann on Cöster
Individual reining	Duane Latimer on Hang Ten Surprise; Canada	Tim McQuay on Mister Nicadual; United States	Aaron Ralston on Smart Paul Olena; United States
Team reining	United States (USA); Dell Hendricks on Starbucks Sidekick; Tim McQuay on Mister Nicadual; Matt Mills on Easy Otie Whiz; Aaron Ralston on Smart Paul Olena	Canada (CAN); Luke Gagnon on Lil Santana; François Gauthier on Show Gun; Lance Griffin on Whiz'n'Tag Chex; Duane Latimer on Hang Ten Surprise	Italy (ITA); Dario Carmignani on Skeets Dun; Adriano Meacci on Docs Tivio Hancock; Christian Perez on Dualin For Me; Marco Ricotta on Pappy Secolo
Men's vaulting	Kai Vorberg on Picasso; Germany	Gero Meyer on Arador; Germany	Ladislav Majdlen on Catalin III-73; Slovakia
Women's vaulting	Megan Benjamin on Leonardo; United States	Katharina Faltin on Pitucelli; Austria	Sissa Jarz on Escudo Fox; Austria
Squad vaulting	Germany (GER)	United States (USA)	Austria (AUT)

=== Medal count ===
* Host nation (Germany)

Rank	Nation	Gold	Silver	Bronze	Total
1	Germany (GER)*	6	1	4	11
2	United States (USA)	2	4	3	9
3	Netherlands (NED)	2	3	1	6
4	Belgium (BEL)	2	1	0	3
5	France (FRA)	1	1	1	3
6	Canada (CAN)	1	1	0	2
6	Great Britain (GBR)	1	1	0	2
8	Spain (ESP)	1	0	0	1
9	Austria (AUT)	0	1	2	3
10	Australia (AUS)	0	1	1	2
10	Denmark (DEN)	0	1	1	2
12	Switzerland (SUI)	0	1	0	1
13	Italy (ITA)	0	0	1	1
13	Portugal (POR)	0	0	1	1
13	Slovakia (SVK)	0	0	1	1
Totals (15 entries)		16	16	16	48

== Officials ==
The Ground Jury during the 2006 World Equestrian Games was nominated as follows;

Dressage

- (Germany) Dieter Schüle (Ground Jury President)
- (United States) Linda Zang (Ground Jury Member)
- (Netherlands) Ghislain Fouarge (Ground Jury Member)
- (United Kingdom) Stephen Clarke (Ground Jury Member)
- (France) Bernard Maurel (Ground Jury Member)
- (Poland) Wojtek Markowski (Ground Jury Member)
- (Australia) Mary Seefried (Ground Jury Member)
- (Belgium) Mariette Withages (Technical Delegate)

Jumping

- (Germany) Hanno Dohn (Ground Jury President)
- (Sweden) Sven Holmberg (Ground Jury Member)
- (Argentina) Pablo Mayorga (Ground Jury Member)
- (Republic of Ireland) Ronan Sugrue (Ground Jury Member)
- (Germany) Frank Rothenberger (Course Designer)
- (France) Frédéric Cottier (Technical Delegate)

Eventing

- (United Kingdom) Angela Tucker (Ground Jury President)
- (United States) Brian Ross (Ground Jury Member)
- (Germany) Martin Plewa (Ground Jury Member)
- (Germany) Rüdiger Schwarz (Course Designer)
- (Belgium) Tom Ryckewaert (Technical Delegate)

== Broadcasting rights ==
The television broadcasting rights to the 2006 Games were held by the following networks:

- CBC Country Canada
- (European Union) Eurosport
- (France) Equidia
- (Germany) ARD, WDR, ZDF
- (Italy) RAI
- (Netherlands) NOS
- (Switzerland) SF, TSI, TSR
- (Sweden) SVT
- (United Arab Emirates) Dubai TV
- (United Kingdom) BBC
- (United States) HorseTV

== See also ==
- 2006 CHIO Aachen
- Equestrian at the 2008 Summer Olympics
