= Individual dressage at the 2009 FEI European Jumping and Dressage Championships =

The individual dressage at the 2009 FEI European Jumping and Dressage Championships in Windsor, Great Britain was held at Windsor Castle from 25 to 30 August.

The Netherlands's Edward Gal won the gold medal in the Grand Prix Freestyle. Adelinde Cornelissen representing Netherlands won a golden medal the Grand Prix Special and silver in the Grand Prix Freestyle. Laura Bechtolsheimer of Great Britain won a bronze in the Special while Dutch triple Olympic gold medalist Anky van Grunsven won the bronze medal in the Freestyle. In the Grand Prix The Netherlands won the golden team medal, while the Great Britain won the silver medal and Germany bronze.Edward Gal broke the World Record in the Grand Prix Freestyle with scoring for the first time over the 90%. He also broke the World Record in the Grand Prix Special, but Adelinde Cornelissen, who rode her test after Edward broke the WR again.

== Competition format ==
The team and individual dressage competitions used the same results. Dressage had three phases. The first phase was the Grand Prix. Top 30 individuals advanced to the second phase, the Grand Prix Special where the first individual medals were awarded. The last set of medals at the 2013 European Dressage Championships was awarded after the third phase, the Grand Prix Freestyle where top 15 combinations competed, with a maximum of the three best riders per country.

== Judges ==
The following judges were appointed to officiate during the European Dressage Championships.

- (United Kingdom) Stephen Clarke (Ground Jury President)
- (France) Isabelle Judet (Ground Jury Member)
- (Netherlands) Francis Verbeek- van Rooy (Ground Jury Member)
- (United States) Anne Gribbons (Ground Jury Member)
- (Poland) Wojtech Markowski (Ground Jury Member)
- (Germany) Katrina Wüst (Ground Jury Member)
- (Sweden) Eric Lette (Ground Jury Member)

== Schedule ==
All times are Central European Summer Time (UTC-0)

Date	Time	Round
Wednesday, 25 August 2009	10:00	Grand Prix (Day 1)
Thursday, 26 August 2009	10:00	Grand Prix (Day 2)
Friday, 27 August 2009	10:00	Grand Prix Special
Sunday, 29 August 2009	20:00	Grand Prix Freestyle

== Results ==
Rider	Nation	Horse	GP score	Rank	GPS score	Rank	GPF score	Rank
Edward Gal	Netherlands	Totilas	84.085	1 Q	83.042	(silver) Q	90.750	1st place, gold medalist(s)
Adelinde Cornelissen	Netherlands	Jerich Parzival	80.638	2 Q	84.042	(gold) Q	87.350	2nd place, silver medalist(s)
Laura Bechtolsheimer	Great Britain	Mistral Hojris	76.638	3 Q	80.083	(bronze) Q	81.750	4
Matthias Alexander Rath	Germany	Sterntaler-Unicef	75.617	4 Q	75.458	6 Q	77.850	6
Victoria Max-Theurer	Austria	Augustin OLD	74.000	5 Q	75.958	5 Q	79.000	5
Anky van Grunsven	Netherlands	Salinero	73.872	6 Q	77.917	4 Q	87.250	3rd place, bronze medalist(s)
Imke Schellekens-Bartels	Netherlands	Sunrise	73.149	7 Q	74.083	7		
Emma Hindle	Great Britain	Lancet	72.936	8 Q	70.750	16 Q	76.050	8
Nathalie Zu-Sayn Wittgenstein	Denmark	Digby	72.894	9 Q	71.417	14 Q	74.300	11
Tinne Vilhelmson-Silfvén	Sweden	Favorit	72.340	10 Q	72.125	12 Q	62.800	15
Monica Theodorescu	Germany	Whisper 128	72.340	10 Q	71.750	13 Q	75.950	9
Patrik Kittel	Sweden	Watermill Scandic	72.255	12 Q	73.958	8 Q	73.350	13
Carl Hester	Great Britain	Liebling II	72.085	13 Q	72.250	10 Q	75.900	10
Kyra Kyrklund	Finland	Max	72.000	14 Q	73.917	9 Q	76.450	7
Susanne Lebek	Germany	Potomac 4	71.277	15 Q	72.250	10 Q	72.450	14
Andreas Helgstrand	Denmark	Helenenhof's Carabas	70.809	16 Q	65.083	29		
Ellen Schulten-Baumer	Germany	Donatha S	70.638	17 Q	70.917	15		
Peter Gmoser	Austria	Contrieau 10	70.170	18 Q	68.833	19		
Minna Telde	Sweden	Don Charlie 1052	69.957	19 Q	69.958	17 Q	73.600	12
Juan Manuel Munoz Diaz	Spain	Fuego de Cardenas	69.745	20 Q	67.292	24		
Anne van Olst	Denmark	Exquis Clearwater	69.404	21 Q	67.042	26		
Alexandra Korelova	Russia	Balagur	69.191	22 Q	69.125	18		
Jordi Domingo Coll	Spain	Prestige	69.021	23 Q	65.667	27		
Anna Merveldt	Ireland	Coryolano	68.426	24 Q	67.125	25		
Christian Pläge	Switzerland	Regent	68.085	25 Q	65.375	28		
Sune Hansen	Denmark	Casmir	68.043	26 Q	68.292	21		
Maria Eilberg	Great Britain	Two Sox	67.915	27 Q	68.833	19		
Katarzyna Milczarek	Poland	Ekwador	67.617	27 Q	67.333	23		
Maria Eriksson	Sweden	Galliano	66.936	29 Q	61.708	30		
Marcela Krinke-Susmelj	Switzerland	Corinth	66.590	29 Q	67.583	22		
Jeroen Devroe	Belgium	Apollo van het Vijverhof	66.000	31				
Carlos Pinto	Portugal	Poderoso de Retiro	65.660	32				
Pierluigi Sangiorgi	Italy	Flourian	65.617	33				
Stefan van Ingelgem	Belgium	Withney van 't Genthof	65.489	34				
Claudio Castilla Ruiz	Spain	Jade de MV	65.362	35				
Hannes Mayr	Austria	Ellis	64.936	36				
Jean Philippe Siat	France	Tarski van de Zuuthoeve	64.936	36				
Iryna Lis	Belarus	Redford 2	64.809	38				
Svetlana Kiseliova	Ukraine	Parish	63.872	39				
Olga Klimko	Ukraine	Highlight 36	63.532	40				
Hubert Perring	France	Diabolo st Maurice	63.362	41				
Anna Paprocka-Campanella	Italy	Prego	63.106	42				
Daniel Pinto	Portugal	Galopin de la Font	63.106	43				
Susanna Bordone	Italy	Dark Surprise 4	62.894	44				
Maria Caetano	Portugal	Diamant 394	62.894	44				
Nikolaus Erdmann	Austria	Danny Wilde	62.426	46				
Michal Rapcewicz	Poland	Randon	62.298	46				
Juan Antonio Jiminez Cobo	Spain	Piconero IV	62.043	48				
Larisa Bushina	Russia	Kompliment	61.106	49				
Yvette Truesdale	Ireland	Has To Be Fun	60.894	50				
Airisa Penele	Latvia	Ravels	60.723	50				
Olga Michalik	Poland	Harmonia	60.596	52				
Wim Verwimp	Belgium	Maxwill V	60.426	53				
Marc Boblet	France	Whitni Star	WD	54				
