= Team dressage at the 2009 FEI European Jumping and Dressage Championships =

The team dressage at the 2009 FEI European Jumping and Dressage Championships took place between August 25 and 26 at Windsor Castle.

== Medalists ==
| Gold: | | Silver: | | Bronze: | |
| Netherlands | | Great Britain | | Germany | |
| Edward Gal | Moorlands Totilas | Laura Bechtolsheimer | Mistral Højris | Matthias Alexander Rath | Sterntale-Unicef |
| Adelinde Cornelissen | Parzival | Emma Hindle | Lancet | Monica Theodorescu | Whisper |
| Anky van Grunsven | Salinero | Carl Hester | Liebling II | Susanne Lebek | Potomac |
| Imke Schellekens-Bartels | Sunrise | Maria Eilberg | Two Sox | Ellen Schulten-Baumer | Donatha S |

== Results ==
Italics indicates dropped score.

| Rank | Country | | | Total |
| Rank | Rider | Horse | % Score | Total |
|---|---|---|---|---|
| 1st place, gold medalist(s) | Netherlands | | | 238.595 |
| 1st place, gold medalist(s) | Edward Gal | Moorlands Totilas | 84.085 | 238.595 |
| 1st place, gold medalist(s) | Adelinde Cornelissen | Parzival | 80.638 | 238.595 |
| 1st place, gold medalist(s) | Anky van Grunsven | Salinero | 73.872 | 238.595 |
| 1st place, gold medalist(s) | Imke Schellekens-Bartels | Sunrise | 73.149 | 238.595 |
| 2nd place, silver medalist(s) | Great Britain | | | 221.659 |
| 2nd place, silver medalist(s) | Laura Bechtolsheimer | Mistral Hojris | 76.638 | 221.659 |
| 2nd place, silver medalist(s) | Emma Hindle | Lancet | 72.936 | 221.659 |
| 2nd place, silver medalist(s) | Carl Hester | Liebling II | 72.085 | 221.659 |
| 2nd place, silver medalist(s) | Maria Eilberg | Two Sox | 67.915 | 221.659 |
| 3rd place, bronze medalist(s) | Germany | | | 219.234 |
| 3rd place, bronze medalist(s) | Matthias Alexander Rath | Sterntale-Unicef | 75.617 | 219.234 |
| 3rd place, bronze medalist(s) | Monica Theodorescu | Whisper | 72.340 | 219.234 |
| 3rd place, bronze medalist(s) | Susanne Lebek | Potomac | 71.277 | 219.234 |
| 3rd place, bronze medalist(s) | Ellen Schulten-Baumer | Donatha S | 70.638 | 219.234 |
| 4 | Sweden | | | 214.552 |
| 4 | Tinne Vilhelmson-Silfven | Favourit | 72.340 | 214.552 |
| 4 | Patrik Kittel | Watermill Scandic H.B.C. | 72.255 | 214.552 |
| 4 | Minna Telde | Don Charly | 69.957 | 214.552 |
| 4 | Maria Eriksson | Galliano | 66.936 | 214.552 |
| 5 | Denmark | | | 213.107 |
| 5 | Nathalie Zu Seyn-Wittgenstein | Digby | 72.894 | 213.107 |
| 5 | Andreas Helgstrand | Tannenhof's Carabas | 70.809 | 213.107 |
| 5 | Anne van Olst | Exquis Clearwater | 69.404 | 213.107 |
| 5 | Sune Hansen | Gredstedgards Casmir | 68.043 | 213.107 |
| 6 | Austria | | | 209.106 |
| 6 | Victoria Max-Theurer | Augustin OLD | 74.000 | 209.106 |
| 6 | Peter Gmoser | Cointreau | 70.170 | 209.106 |
| 6 | Hannes Mayr | Ellis | 64.936 | 209.106 |
| 6 | Nikolaus Erdmann | Danny Wilde | 62.426 | 209.106 |
| 7 | Spain | | | 204.128 |
| 7 | Juan Manuel Munoz Diaz | Fuego XII | 69.745 | 204.128 |
| 7 | Jordi Domingo Coll | Prestige | 69.021 | 204.128 |
| 7 | Claudio Castilla Ruiz | Jade de MV | 65.362 | 204.128 |
| 7 | Juan Antonio Jimenez | Piconero IV | 62.043 | 204.128 |
| 8 | Belgium | | | 191.915 |
| 8 | Jeroen Devroe | Apollo van het Vijverhof | 66.000 | 191.915 |
| 8 | Stefan Van Ingelem | Withney van't Genthof | 65.489 | 191.915 |
| 8 | Wim Verwimp | Maxvil V | 60.426 | 191.915 |
| 9 | Portugal | | | 191.660 |
| 9 | Carlos Pinto | Poderoso do Retiro | 65.660 | 191.660 |
| 9 | Daniel Pinto | Galopin de la Font | 63.106 | 191.660 |
| 9 | Maria Caetano | Diamant | 62.894 | 191.660 |
| 10 | Italy | | | 191.617 |
| 10 | Pierluigi Sangiorgi | Flourian | 65.617 | 191.617 |
| 10 | Anna Paprocka-Campanella | Prego | 63.106 | 191.617 |
| 10 | Susanna Bordone | Dark Surprise | 62.894 | 191.617 |
| 11 | Poland | | | 190.511 |
| 11 | Katarzyna Milczarek | Ekwador | 67.617 | 190.511 |
| 11 | Michal Rapcewicz | Randon | 62.298 | 190.511 |
| 11 | Olga Michalik | Harmonia | 60.596 | 190.511 |
| 12 | France | | | 128.298 |
| 12 | Jean Philippe Siat | Tarski van de Zuuthoeve | 64.936 | 128.298 |
| 12 | Hubert Perring | Diabolo St. Maurice | 63.362 | 128.298 |
| 12 | Marc Boblet | Whitni Star | DNS | 128.298 |
