= Individual dressage at the 2010 FEI World Equestrian Games =

Event at the 2010 FEI World Equestrian Games

The individual dressage at the 2010 FEI World Equestrian Games in Lexington, Kentucky, United States of America was held at Kentucky Horse Park from September 25 to October 1, 2010.

Dutch Edward Gal won the gold medal in the Grand Prix Special and Grand Prix Freestyle. Laura Bechtolsheimer representing Great Britain won a silver medal in the Grand Prix Special and Grand Prix Freestyle and the Steffen Peters won bronze in the Special and Freestyle as well, becoming the first American dressage rider made it on the individual podium at a World Championship.

== Competition format ==
The team and individual dressage competitions used the same results. Dressage had three phases. The first phase was the Grand Prix. The top 30 individuals advanced to the second phase, the Grand Prix Special where the first individual medals were awarded. The Individual Grand Prix Freestyle was the third phase where the best 15 competed and the final individual medals were awarded.

== Judges ==
The Grand Prix, Grand Prix Special and Grand Prix Freestyle were assessed by a group of seven appointed judges, five judges each phase. The president of the ground jury was the Linda Zang from The United States of America. Her colleagues were Stephen Clarke from Great Britain, Cara Whitham from Canada, Evi Eisenhardt from Germany, Ghislain Fouarge from The Netherlands, Maribel Alonso de Quinzanos from Mexico and Mary Seefried from Australia. Wojtech Markowski from Poland was the Technical Delegate.

== Schedule ==
Event date	Starting time	Event details
27 September	08:30	Team Grand Prix–1st Half
28 September	07:30	Team Grand Prix–2nd Half
29 September	10:00	Grand Prix Special–1st Half
29 September	14:30	Grand Prix Special–2nd Half
1 October	19:00	Grand Prix Freestyle

== Results ==
Rider	Nation	Horse	GP score	Rank	GPS score	Rank	GPF score	Rank
Edward Gal	Netherlands	Totilas	84.043	1 Q	85.708	(gold) Q	91.800	1st place, gold medalist(s)
Laura Bechtolsheimer	Great Britain	Misral Højris	82.511	2 Q	81.708	(silver) Q	85.350	2nd place, silver medalist(s)
Steffen Peters	USA	Ravel	78.596	3 Q	78.542	(bronze) Q	84.900	3rd place, bronze medalist(s)
Isabell Werth	Germany	Warum Nicht	75.404	4 Q	72.000	10 Q	80.000	6
Juan Manuel Munoz Diaz	Spain	Fuego XII	73.957	5 Q	76.042	4 Q	81.450	5
Nathalie Zu Sayn-Wittgenstein	Denmark	Digby	73.830	6 Q	72.875	7 Q	78.750	7
Imke Schellekens-Bartels	Netherlands	Sunrise	73.447	7 Q	74.792	5 Q	82.100	4
Christoph Koschel	Germany	Donnperignon	72.638	8 Q	73.292	6 Q	76.100	10
Matthias Alexander Rath	Germany	Sterntaler-UNICEF	72.553	9 Q	70.250	13		
Hans-Peter Minderhoud	Netherlands	Nadine	72.255	10 Q	68.333	22		
Carl Hester	Great Britain	Liebling II	72.128	10 Q	69.417	17		
Ashley Holzer	Canada	Pop-Art	70.383	12 Q	71.708	11 Q	76.550	8
Marcela Krinke-Susmelj	Switzerland	Corinth	70.340	13 Q	70.417	12 Q	75.300	11
Fiona Bigwood	Great Britain	Wie-Atlantico	70.128	14 Q	69.708	16 Q	73.400	12
Brett Parbery	Australia	Victory Salute	70.085	15 Q	72.167	9 Q	76.350	9
Tina Konyot	USA	Calecto V	69.915	16 Q	68.625	20		
Katherine Bateson	USA	Nartan	69.617	17 Q	68.875	19		
Anne van Olst	Denmark	Clearwater	69.532	18 Q	68.958	18		
Michal Rapcewicz	Poland	Randon	69.191	19 Q	69.875	15 Q	70.400	15
Sune Hansen	Denmark	Gredstedgårds Casmir	69.106	20 Q	64.708	30		
Belinda Trussell	Canada	Anton	69.021	21 Q	67.208	25		
Emma Kanerva	Finland	Sini Spirit	68.851	22 Q	67.667	24		
Rachael Sanna	Australia	Jaybee Alabaster	68.809	23 Q	67.000	27		
Hiroshi Hoketsu	Japan	Whisper	68.681	24 Q	61.625	31		
José Antonio García Mena	Spain	Norte	68.638	25 Q	68.000	23		
Maria Eilberg	Great Britain	Two-Sox	68.213	26 Q	68.500	21		
Katarzyna Milczarek	Poland	Ekwador	68.085	27 Q	67.208	25		
Minna Telde	Sweden	Larina-Höm	68.000	28 Q	66.042	28		
Lillann Jebsen	Norway	Pro-Set	67.957	29 Q	65.583	29		
Anabel Balkenhol	Germany	Dablino	67.702	30 Q	72.625	8 Q	73.250	13
Peter Gmoser	Austria	Cointreau	67.702	30 Q	70.167	14 Q	71.500	14
Jeroen Devroe	Belgium	Apollo van het Vijverhof	67.532	32				
Mafalda Galiza Mendes	Portugal	D'Artagnan	67.489	33				
Claudio Castilla Ruiz	Spain	Jade de MV	67.319	34				
Gonçalo Carvalho	Portugal	Rubi	66.766	35				
Victoria Winter	Canada	Proton	66.681	36				
Stefan van Ingelghem	Belgium	Whitney van 't Genthof	66.638	37				
Todd Flettrich	USA	Otto	66.553	38				
Susan de Klein	Netherlands Antilles	Prins	66.511	39				
Elisabeth Eversfield-Koch	Switzerland	The Lion King B	66.340	40				
Oded Shimodi	Israel	Granada	66.298	41				
Patrik Kittel	Sweden	Scandic	66.255	42				
Claudia Fassaert	Belgium	Donnerfee	66.255	42				
Tinne Vilhelmson Silfven	Sweden	Favourite	66.000	44				
Pierluigi Sangiorgi	Italy	Flourian	65.830	45				
Lyndal Oatley	Australia	Potifar	65.574	46				
Anne Troensegaard	Denmark	Seduc	65.447	47				
Bonny Bonello	Canada	Pikardi	65.447	47				
Daniel Pinto	Portugal	Galopin de la Font	65.319	49				
Philippe Jorissen	Belgium	Le Beau	64.809	50				
Cathrine Rasmussen	Norway	Orlando III	64.468	51				
Susanna Bordone	Italy	Dark Surprise	64.340	52				
Camilla Kalseth	Norway	Carte O'Dor	64.170	53				
Yuko Kitai	Japan	Fairytale	64.000	54				
Luiza de Almeida	Brazil	Samba	63.574	55				
Marcelo Alexandre	Brazil	Signo dos Pinhais	63.234	56				
Rafael Ortiz	Spain	G Nidium	63.021	57				
Rogerio Clementino	Brazil	Portugal	61.872	58				
Mieko Yagi	Japan	Dow Jones	61.319	59				
Gaston Chelius	Luxembourg	Flamenco R	61.149	60				
Judy Reynolds	Ireland	Remember	61.021	61				
Hiroyuki Kitahara	Japan	Why Me	58.170	62				
Marco Bernal	Colombia	Halbgott	57.362	63				
Hayley Beresford	Australia	Relâmpago do Retiro	EL	64				
Adelinde Cornelissen	Netherlands	Parzival	EL	64				
Ellen Birgitte Farbrot	Norway	CC Royal	DNS	65				
