= Individual dressage at the 2018 FEI World Equestrian Games =

Tryon, United States

The individual dressage at the 2018 FEI World Equestrian Games in Tryon, United States was held at Tryon International Equestrian Center from September 11 to September 23, 2018.

Germany's Isabell Werth won the gold medal in the Grand Prix Special. Laura Graves representing United States won a silver medal in the Grand Prix Special and the title defender Charlotte Dujardin won bronze in the Special, her first individual medal at a major championship with another horse then Valegro.

== Competition format ==
The team and individual dressage competitions used the same results. Dressage had three phases but ended in two. The first phase was the Grand Prix. The top 30 individuals advanced to the second phase, the Grand Prix Special where the first individual medals were awarded. The Individual Grand Prix Freestyle was cancelled due to Hurricane Florence.

== Judges ==
The Grand Prix and Grand Prix Special were assessed by seven judges. The president of the ground jury was the Anne Gribbons from The United States of America. Her colleagues were Katrina Wüst from Germany, Andrew Ralph Gardner from Great Britain, Mariëtte Sanders van Gansewinkel from The Netherlands, Annette Fransen Iacobaeus from Sweden, Susan Hoevenaars from Australia and Hans-Christian Matthiesen from Denmark. Thomas Lang from Austria was the reserve judge, while Cara Whitham from Canada was the Technical Delegate.

== Schedule ==
| Event date | Starting time | Event details |
|---|---|---|
| 12 September | 08:45 | Grand Prix Day 1 |
| 13 September | 08:45 | Grand Prix Day 2 |
| 14 September | 10:30 | Grand Prix Special |
| 16 September | 08:30 | Grand Prix Freestyle (cancelled due to Hurricane Florence) |

== Results ==
| Rider | Nation | Horse | GP score | Rank | GPS score | Rank |
|---|---|---|---|---|---|---|
| Isabell Werth | Germany | Bella Rose | 84.829 | 1 Q | 86.246 | 1st place, gold medalist(s) |
| Laura Graves | United States of America | Verdades | 81.537 | 2 Q | 81.717 | 2nd place, silver medalist(s) |
| Sonke Rothenberger | Germany | Cosmo | 81.444 | 3 Q | 81.277 | 4 |
| Patrik Kittel | Sweden | Well Done de la Rouche CMF | 78.199 | 4 Q | 79.726 | 5 |
| Charlotte Dujardin | Great Britain | Mount st. John Freestyle | 77.764 | 5 Q | 81.489 | 3rd place, bronze medalist(s) |
| Carl Hester | Great Britain | Hawins Delicato | 77.283 | 6 Q | 77.219 | 9 |
| Edward Gal | Netherlands | Glock's Zonik | 77.189 | 7 Q | 77.751 | 7 |
| Kasey Perry-Glass | United States of America | Goerklintgaards Dublet | 76.739 | 8 Q | 78.541 | 6 |
| Jessica von Bredow-Werndl | Germany | Dalera TSF | 76.677 | 9 Q | 73.875 | 16 |
| Daniel Bachmann Andersen | Denmark | Blue Hors Zack | 76.211 | 10 Q | 73.541 | 17 |
| Therese Nilshagen | Sweden | Dante Weltino OLD | 76.009 | 10 Q | 75.821 | 10 |
| Juliette Ramel | Sweden | Buriel K.H. | 75.248 | 12 Q | 77.280 | 8 |
| Dorothee Schneider | Germany | Sammy Davis Jr. | 75.062 | 13 Q | 75.608 | 11 |
| Adrienne Lyle | United States of America | Salvino | 74.860 | 14 Q | 69.043 | 29 |
| Spencer Wilton | Great Britain | Super Nova II | 74.581 | 15 Q | DNS | 30 |
| Severo Jurado Lopez | Spain | Deep Impact | 74.581 | 16 Q | 73.116 | 18 |
| Hans-Peter Minderhoud | Netherlands | Glock's Dream Boy | 73.509 | 17 Q | 72.052 | 20 |
| Steffen Peters | United States of America | Supperkasper | 73.494 | 18 Q | 69.073 | 28 |
| Tinne Vilhelmson Silfven | Sweden | Don Auriello | 73.106 | 19 Q | 71.632 | 21 |
| Madeleine Witte-Vrees | Netherlands | Cennin | 72.966 | 20 Q | 71.489 | 22 |
| Beatriz Ferrer-Salat | Spain | Delgado | 72.919 | 21 Q | 74.103 | 13 |
| Emile Faurie | Great Britain | Dono di Maggio OLD | 72.795 | 22 Q | 70.380 | 27 |
| Emmelie Scholtens | Netherlands | Apache | 72.733 | 23 Q | 70.562 | 25 |
| Claudio Castilla Ruiz | Spain | Alcaide | 72.686 | 24 Q | 74.103 | 14 |
| Inessa Merkulova | Russia | Mister X | 72.640 | 25 Q | 72.523 | 19 |
| Judy Reynolds | Ireland | Vancouver K | 71.957 | 26 Q | 73.982 | 15 |
| Kristy Oatley | Australia | Du Soleil | 71.584 | 27 Q | 74.605 | 12 |
| Maria Caetano | Portugal | Coroado | 71.165 | 28 Q | 71.018 | 23 |
| Laurence Roos | Belgium | Fil Rouge | 70.978 | 29 Q | 70.471 | 26 |
| Rikke Svane | Denmark | Finckenstein TSF | 70.233 | 30 Q | 70.714 | 24 |
| Betina Jæger | Denmark | Mane Stream Belstaff | 70.140 | 31 | | |
| Brett Parbery | Australia | DP Weltmieser | 70.109 | 32 | | |
| Brittany Fraser | Canada | All In | 70.016 | 33 | | |
| Riccardo Sanavio | Italy | Glock's Federleicht | 69.658 | 34 | | |
| Tatyana Kosterina | Russia | Diavolessa V.A. | 69.472 | 35 | | |
| Julie Brougham | New Zealand | Vom Feinsten | 68.991 | 36 | | |
| Antonella Joannou | Switzerland | Dandy de la Roche CMF CH | 68.820 | 37 | | |
| Anders Dahl | Denmark | Selten HW | 68.758 | 38 | | |
| Belinda Trussell | Canada | Tattoo 15 | 68.634 | 39 | | |
| Jeroen Devroe | Belgium | Eres DL | 68.540 | 40 | | |
| Juan Matute Guimon | Spain | Quantico Ymas | 68.494 | 41 | | |
| Mary Hanna | Australia | Boogie Woogie 6 | 68.323 | 42 | | |
| Fanny Verliefden | Belgium | Indoctro v/h Steenblok | 67.981 | 43 | | |
| Jill Irving | Canada | Degas 12 | 67.888 | 44 | | |
| Birgit Wientzek Pläge | Switzerland | Robinvale | 67.842 | 45 | | |
| Shingo Hayashi | Japan | Clearwater | 67.655 | 46 | | |
| Kim Dong-seon | Korea | Bukowski | 67.562 | 47 | | |
| Emma Kanerva | Finland | Heartbreaker | 67.516 | 48 | | |
| Alexis Hellyer | Australia | Bluefields Floreno | 67.360 | 49 | | |
| Jacqueline Wing Ying Siu | Hong Kong | Ferrera | 67.127 | 50 | | |
| Maria Florencia Manfredi | Argentina | Bandurria Kacero | 67.050 | 51 | | |
| Masanao Takahashi | Japan | Rubicon Unitechno | 66.661 | 52 | | |
| Joanne Vaughan | Georgia | Elmegardens Marquis | 66.429 | 53 | | |
| Miguel Ralão Duarte | Portugal | Xenofonte d'Atela | 66.382 | 54 | | |
| Inna Logutenkova | Ukraine | Fleraro | 66.335 | 55 | | |
| Caroline Chew | Singapore | Tribiani | 66.289 | 56 | | |
| Annabelle Collins | Bermuda | Joyero VG | 66.118 | 57 | | |
| Julio Cesar Mendoza Loor | Ecuador | Chardonnay | 65.916 | 58 | | |
| João Victor Marcari Oliva | Brazil | Xiripiti | 65.512 | 59 | | |
| Kiichi Harada | Japan | Egistar | 65.481 | 60 | | |
| Ismail Jilaoui | Morocco | What A Feeling | 65.435 | 61 | | |
| Vasco Mira Godinho | Portugal | Bariloche | 65.388 | 62 | | |
| Kazuki Sado | Japan | Barolo | 65.357 | 63 | | |
| Giovana Prado Pass | Brazil | Zingaro de Lyw | 65.217 | 64 | | |
| Elena Sidneva | Russia | Fuhur 6 | 64.953 | 65 | | |
| Gretha Ferreira | South Africa | Lertevangs Lavinia | 64.332 | 66 | | |
| Manuel Veiga | Portugal | Ben Hur Da Broa | 64.208 | 67 | | |
| Caroline Häcki | Switzerland | Rigoletto Royal CH | 63.540 | 68 | | |
| Pierluigi Sangiorgi | Italy | Gelo Delle Schiave | 63.292 | 69 | | |
| Evgenija Davydova | Russia | Awakening | 63.276 | 70 | | |
| Leandro Aparecido Da Silva | Brazil | Dicaprio | 63.171 | 71 | | |
| Pedro Manuel Tavares de Almeida | Brazil | Aoleo | 62.578 | 72 | | |
| Estelle Wettstein | Switzerland | West Side Story OLD | 62.019 | 73 | | |
| Ellesse Tzinberg | Philippines | Triviant | 60.916 | 74 | | |
| Megan Lane | Canada | Zodiac MW | 60.901 | 75 | | |
| Christian Zimmermann | Palestine | Roble | 60.342 | 76 | | |
| Isabel Cool | Belgium | Aranco V | EL | 77 | | |
