= Equestrian at the 2012 Summer Olympics – Individual dressage =

Individual dressage at the Games of the XXX Olympiad
- Venue: Greenwich Park
- Date: 2–9 August 2012
- Competitors: 50 from 23 nations

Medalists
1st place, gold medalist(s)		Charlotte Dujardin	Great Britain
2nd place, silver medalist(s)		Adelinde Cornelissen	Netherlands
3rd place, bronze medalist(s)		Laura Bechtolsheimer	Great Britain

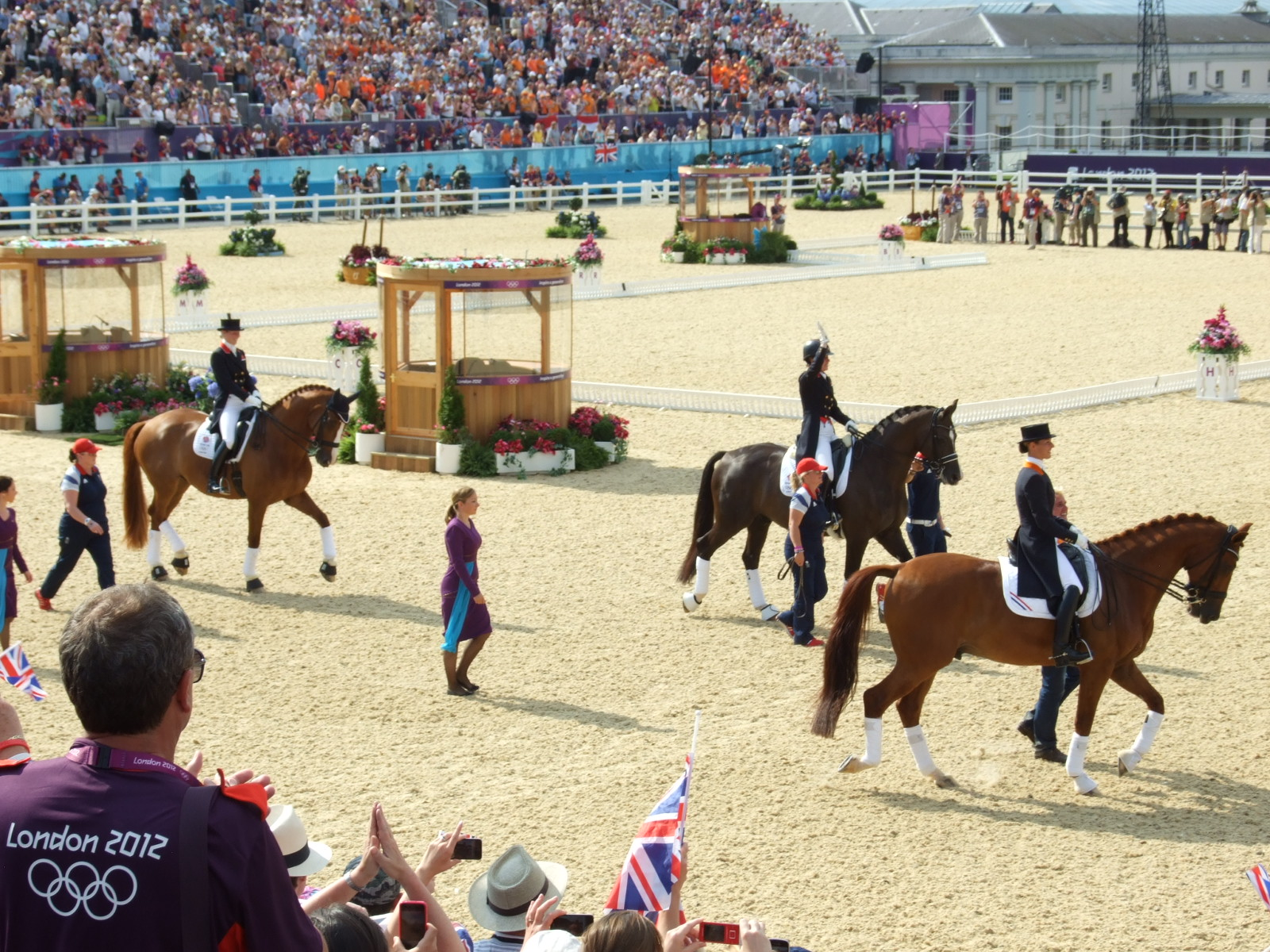
The individual dressage medalists, (l to r) Laura Bechtolsheimer, Charlotte Dujardin and Adelinde Cornelissen, parading past spectators prior to the awards ceremony.

The individual dressage in equestrian at the 2012 Olympic Games in London was held at Greenwich Park from 2 to 9 August. Great Britain's Charlotte Dujardin won the gold medal and Laura Bechtolsheimer the bronze. The silver was won by Adelinde Cornelissen of the Netherlands.

== Competition format ==
The team and individual dressage competitions used the same results. Dressage had three phases, with the last being used only for the individual event. The first phase was the Grand Prix. Individuals advanced to the second phase, the Grand Prix Special, if they were on one of the top seven teams or were one of the top 11 remaining competitors. The top 18 competitors in the Grand Prix Special (ignoring Grand Prix scores) advanced to the final phase, the Grand Prix Freestyle. The results of that phase (again ignoring previous scores) produced final results.

== Schedule ==
All times are British Summer Time (UTC+1)

Date	Time	Round
Thursday, 2 August 2012	11:00	Grand Prix (Day 1)
Friday, 3 August 2012	11:00	Grand Prix (Day 2)
Tuesday, 7 August 2012	10:00	Grand Prix Special
Thursday, 9 August 2012	12:30	Grand Prix Freestyle

== Results ==
Rider	Nation	Horse	GP score	Rank	GPS score	Rank	GPF score	Rank
Charlotte Dujardin	Great Britain	Valegro	83.663	1 Q	83.286	1 Q	90.089	1st place, gold medalist(s)
Adelinde Cornelissen	Netherlands	Parzival	81.687	2 Q	81.968	2 Q	88.196	2nd place, silver medalist(s)
Laura Bechtolsheimer	Great Britain	Mistral Højris	76.839	7 Q	77.794	5 Q	84.339	3rd place, bronze medalist(s)
Helen Langehanenberg	Germany	Damon Hill	81.140	3 Q	78.937	4 Q	84.303	4
Carl Hester	Great Britain	Uthopia	77.720	5 Q	80.571	3 Q	82.857	5
Anky van Grunsven	Netherlands	Salinero	73.343	16 Q	74.794	12 Q	82.000	6
Dorothee Schneider	Germany	Diva Royal	76.277	8 Q	77.571	6 Q	81.661	7
Kristina Sprehe	Germany	Desperados	79.119	4 Q	76.254	=7 Q	81.375	8
Edward Gal	Netherlands	Undercover	75.395	11 Q	75.556	10 Q	80.267	9
Juan Manuel Muñoz	Spain	Fuego	75.608	10 Q	75.476	11 Q	79.321	10
Tinne Vilhelmsson-Silfvén	Sweden	Don Auriello	74.271	14 Q	74.063	15 Q	79.286	11
Nathalie Zu Sayn-Wittgenstein	Denmark	Digby	74.924	13 Q	75.730	9 Q	79.089	12
Victoria Max-Theurer	Austria	Augustin	73.267	17 Q	73.619	17 Q	79.053	13
Patrik Kittel	Sweden	Scandic	74.073	15 Q	74.079	14 Q	78.732	14
Valentina Truppa	Italy	Eremo del Castegno	75.790	9 Q	73.127	18 Q	78.214	15
Gonçalo Carvalho	Portugal	Rubi	71.520	22 Q	74.222	13 Q	77.607	16
Steffen Peters	United States	Ravel	77.705	6 Q	76.254	=7 Q	77.286	17
Anna Kasprzak	Denmark	Donnperignon	75.289	12 Q	73.794	16 Q	76.446	18
Anabel Balkenhol	Germany	Dablino	70.973	24 Q	73.032	19		
Minna Telde	Sweden	Santana	67.477	44 Q	72.270	20		
Anne van Olst	Denmark	Clearwater	71.322	23 Q	72.016	21		
Emma Kanerva	Finland	Sini Spirit	70.395	29 Q	71.889	22		
Morgan Barbançon	Spain	Painted Black	72.751	19 Q	71.556	23		
Ashley Holzer	Canada	Breaking Dawn	71.809	20 Q	71.317	24		
Tina Konyot	United States	Calecto V	70.456	27 Q	70.651	25		
Richard Davison	Great Britain	Artemis	72.812	18 Q	70.524	26		
Claudia Fassaert	Belgium	Donnerfee	71.793	21 Q	70.095	27		
Jan Ebeling	United States	Rafalca	70.243	30 Q	69.302	28		
José Daniel Martín	Spain	Grandioso	69.043	39 Q	69.286	29		
Mikaela Lindh	Finland	Skovlunds Más Guapo	70.729	26 Q	69.016	30		
Jessica Michel	France	Riwera	70.410	28 Q	68.810	31		
Patrick van der Meer	Netherlands	Uzzo	70.912	25 Q	67.444	32		
Siril Helljesen	Norway	Dorina	69.985	31				
Lisbeth Seierskilde	Denmark	Raneur	69.863	32				
Anna Merveldt	Ireland	Coryolano	69.772	33				
Renate Voglsang	Austria	Fabriano	69.635	34				
Adrienne Lyle	United States	Wizard	69.468	35				
Beata Stremler	Poland	Martini	69.422	36				
Lyndal Oatley	Australia	Sandro Boy	69.377	37				
Katarzyna Milczarek	Poland	Ekwador	69.271	38				
Hiroshi Hoketsu	Japan	Whisper	68.739	40				
Jacqueline Brooks	Canada	D'Niro	68.526	41				
Kristy Oatley	Australia	Clive	68.222	42				
Mary Hanna	Australia	Sancette	67.964	43				
Michał Rapcewicz	Poland	Randon	66.915	45				
Svetlana Kiseliova	Ukraine	Parish	66.763	46				
Luiza de Almeida	Brazil	Pastor	65.866	47				
Louisa Hill	New Zealand	Antonello	65.258	48				
Yassine Rahmouni	Morocco	Floresco	64.453	49				
David Marcus	Canada	Capital	EL	–				
