= Hanni Toosbuy Kasprzak =

Danish businesswoman

- Born: 1957 (age 68–69)
- Known for: Owner and chair of ECCO
- Spouse: Dieter Kasprzak
- Children: 2: André and Anna
- Parent: Karl Toosbuy

Hanni Toosbuy Kasprzak (born 1957) is a Danish billionaire, the owner and chair of ECCO, the Danish shoe company which was founded by her father in 1963.

== Early life ==
Hanni Toosbuy was born in 1957. Her father, Karl Toosbuy, founded ECCO in 1963.

== Career ==
Kasprzak joined ECCO on completing her school education. When she was only 21, she complied with her father's request to work in quality control in India. "I spent more than a year there," she explained. "Learning at the factory level is possibly the best way to understand a business." After India, she went to Germany but returned to Denmark in 1997 as ECCO chairman.

Since March 2014, she has also been a member of Sydbank's advisory board.

In June 2018, according to Forbes, she had a net worth of $2.6 billion.

== Personal life ==
Toosbuy is married to Dieter Kasprzak, who has served as ECCO's president since 2004. Their son, André, is a golfer and their daughter, Anna, practices dressage.
