= Anna Kasprzak =

Danish dressage rider (born 1989)

Personal information
- Born: 8 December 1989 (age 35); Grevenbroich, Germany
Medal record
Equestrian
Representing Denmark
European Championships
Silver medal – second place	2017 Gothenburg	Team dressage
European Young Riders Championships
Bronze medal – third place	2008 Azeitao	Team dressage
Bronze medal – third place	2009 Ermelo	Team dressage
Bronze medal – third place	2010 Kronberg	Freestyle dressage
Bronze medal – third place	2010 Kronberg	Team dressage
European Junior Championships
Silver medal – second place	2005 Billund	Team dressage
Bronze medal – third place	2005 Billund	Individual dressage
Bronze medal – third place	2005 Billund	Freestyle dressage

Anna Kasprzak (born 8 December 1989) is a Danish dressage rider. She represented Denmark at two Summer Olympics (in 2012 and 2016). Her best Olympic result came in 2012 when she placed 4th with a Danish team in the team competition. Meanwhile, her best individual Olympic result is 14th place achieved in 2016.

Kasprzak represented Denmark at 2014 World Equestrian Games held in Normandy, France and at two European Dressage Championships (in 2013 and 2015). She finished 4th with Danish team at the 2013 Europeans held in Herning, Denmark. She also competed at two editions of Dressage World Cup finals (in 2013 and 2016), where she finished 8th and 5th, respectively.

Kasprzak won multiple medals (one silver and six bronze) at various European junior and young riders championships.

== Personal life ==
Kasprzak was born in Germany to a German father and Danish mother. Her mother Hanni Toosbuy Kasprzak is the billionaire owner of the Danish shoe brand ECCO, and her father Dieter Kasprzak is the former CEO. Her father's family has their roots in Hamburg, Germany for many generations. She has a daughter born in 2018 and a son born in 2021, with her partner Mathias Skov Rasch.
