= Ellesse (given name) =

Ellesse is a feminine given name. Notable people with the name include:

- Ellesse Andrews (born 1999), New Zealand racing cyclist
- Ellesse Gundersen (born 1991), Filipino equestrian athlete
