= Karl Toosbuy =

Danish businessman (1928-2004)

- Born: Karl-Heinz Werner Toosbuy; 23 February 1928; Holte, Denmark
- Died: 8 June 2004 (aged 76)
- Known for: Owner and founder of ECCO
- Spouse: Birte Toosbuy
- Children: Hanni Toosbuy Kasprzak

Karl-Heinz Werner Toosbuy (23 February 1928 – 8 June 2004) was a Danish businessman, the founder and owner of ECCO, the Danish shoe company.

Karl Toosbuy trained as a shoemaker and by his early 30s, was running a Copenhagen factory. In 1963, he moved with his wife Birte and daughter Hanni to Bredebro on the west coast of Denmark, just north of the German border. Toosbuy started ECCO in what had been an empty factory.

He died on 8 June 2004.
