= Equestrian at the 2012 Summer Olympics – Team dressage =

Team dressage at the Games of the XXX Olympiad
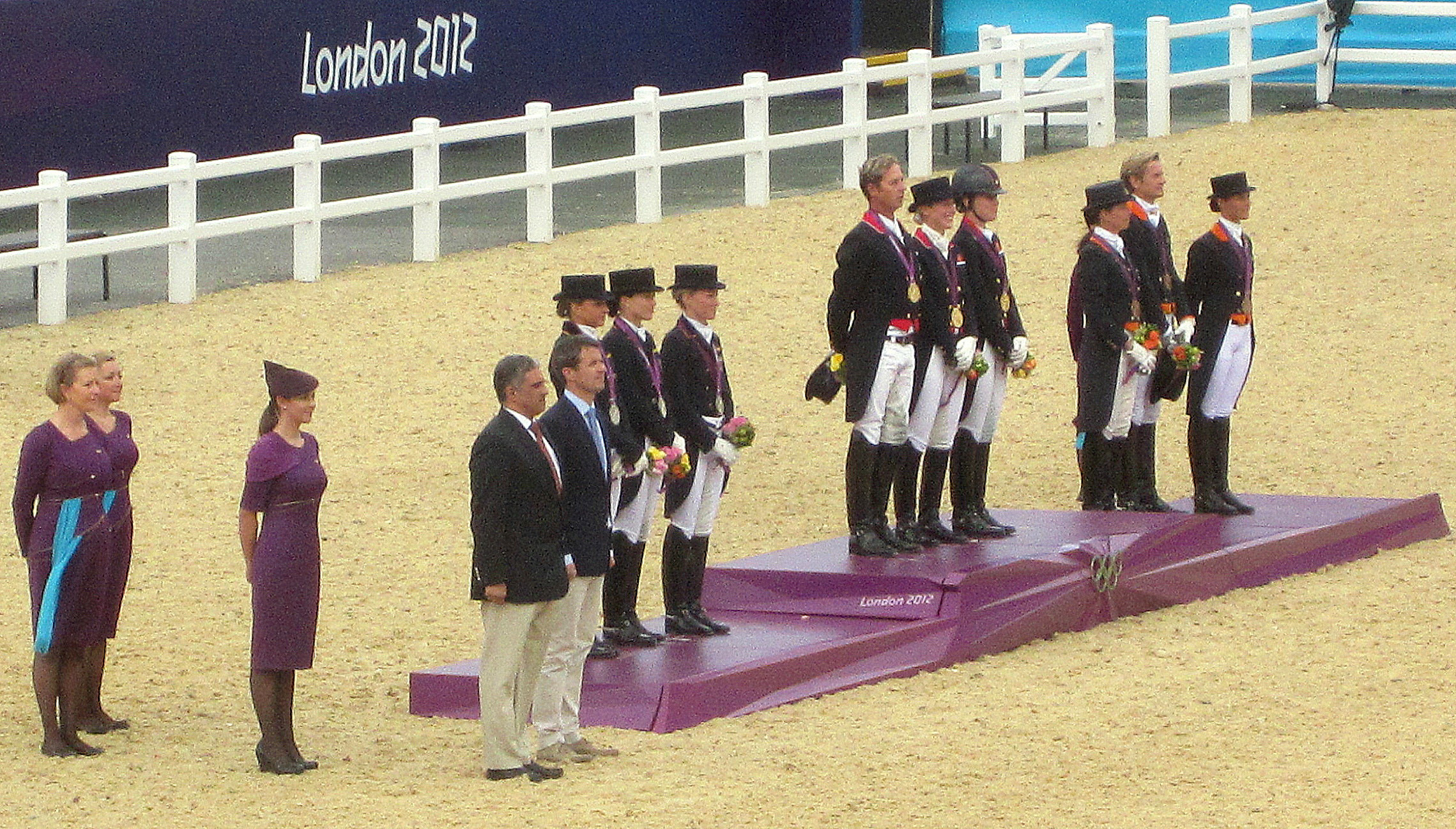
- Team dressage victory ceremony
- Venue: Greenwich Park
- Date: 2–7 August 2012
- Competitors: 30 from 10 nations

Medalists
1st place, gold medalist(s)		Carl Hester; Laura Bechtolsheimer; Charlotte Dujardin	Great Britain
2nd place, silver medalist(s)		Dorothee Schneider; Kristina Sprehe; Helen Langehanenberg	Germany
3rd place, bronze medalist(s)		Anky van Grunsven; Edward Gal; Adelinde Cornelissen	Netherlands

The team dressage in equestrian at the 2012 Olympic Games in London was held at Greenwich Park from 2 to 7 August. The competition was performed on raised arena platforms for the first time, which were suspended by support struts.

== Competition format ==
The team and individual dressage competitions used the same results. Dressage had three phases, with only the first two used in the team competition. The first phase was the Grand Prix. The top seven teams advanced to the second phase, the Grand Prix Special. The results of that phase (ignoring the previous Grand Prix scores) produced the final results. Each phase involves a different test for horse and rider to perform, which is made up of a series of movements that horses perform in a rectangular arena The teams scores were determined by judges Leif Torblas of Denmark, Maribel Alonso of Mexico, Jean Michel Roudier of France, Gary Rockwell of the United States, Wim Ernes of the Netherlands, Evi Eisenhardt of Germany, and Stephan Clarke who is the president of the International Equestrian Federations ground jury

== Schedule ==
All times are British Summer Time (UTC+1)

Date	Time	Round
Thursday 2 August 2012; Friday, 3 August 2012	11:00	Grand Prix
Tuesday, 7 August 2012	10:00	Grand Prix Special

== Results ==
Rank	Name	Horse	GP Score		GPS Score		Overall Average
Rank	Name	Horse	Individual Average	Team Average	Individual Average	Team Average	Overall Average
1st place, gold medalist(s)	Great Britain; Carl Hester; Laura Bechtolsheimer; Charlotte Dujardin	Uthopia; Mistral Hojris; Valegro	77.720; 76.839; 83.663	79.407	80.571; 77.794; 83.286	80.550	79.979
2nd place, silver medalist(s)	Germany; Dorothee Schneider; Kristina Sprehe; Helen Langehanenberg	Diva Royal; Desperados; Damon Hill	76.277; 79.119; 81.140	78.845	77.571; 76.254; 78.937	77.587	78.216
3rd place, bronze medalist(s)	Netherlands; Anky van Grunsven; Edward Gal; Adelinde Cornelissen	Salinero; Undercover; Parzival	73.343; 75.395; 81.687	76.809	74.794; 75.556; 81.968	77.439	77.124
4	Denmark; Anne van Olst; Anna Kasprzak; Nathalie Zu Sayn-Wittgenstein	Clearwater; Donnperignon; Digby	71.322; 75.289; 74.924	73.845	72.016; 73.794; 75.730	73.847	73.846
5	Sweden; Minna Telde; Tinne Vilhelmson-Silfvén; Patrik Kittel	Santana; Don Auriello; Scandic	67.477; 74.271; 74.073	71.940	72.270; 74.063; 74.079	73.471	72.706
6	United States; Jan Ebeling; Tina Konyot; Steffen Peters	Rafalca; Calecto V Ravel	70.243; 70.456; 77.705	72.801	69.302; 70.651; 76.254	72.069	72.435
7	Spain; Jose Daniel Martin Dockx; Morgan Barbancon Mestres; Juan Manuel Munoz Diaz	Grandioso; Painted Black; Fuego	69.043; 72.751; 75.608	72.467	69.286; 71.556; 75.476	72.106	72.287
8	Poland; Michal Rapcewicz; Beata Stremler; Katarzyna Milczarek	Randon; Martini; Ekwador	66.915; 69.422; 69.271	68.536	did not advance		
9	Australia; Kristy Oatley; Lyndal Oatley; Mary Hanna	Clive; Sandro Boy; Sancette	68.222; 69.377; 67.964	68.521	did not advance		
-	Canada; Jacqueline Brooks; David Marcus; Ashley Holzer	D'Niro; Capital; Breaking Dawn	68.526; EL; 71.809	EL	did not advance		
