= Adrienne Lyle =

American equestrian

Personal information
- Discipline: Dressage
- Born: January 2, 1985 (age 41); Coupeville, Washington, U.S.
- Height: 5 ft 11 in (180 cm)
Medal record
Equestrian
Representing the United States
Olympic Games
Silver medal – second place	2020 Tokyo	Team dressage
World Championships
Silver medal – second place	2018 Tryon	Team dressage

Adrienne Lyle (born January 2, 1985 in Coupeville, Washington) is an American Olympic dressage rider. Representing the United States, she competed at the 2012 Summer Olympics in London where she finished 37th in the individual competition, and the 2020 Summer Olympics in Tokyo where she won a silver medal in the team competition. After qualifying for the individual Grand Prix Freestyle at the 2020 Olympics she withdrew from the competition out of concern for her horse, Salvino.

In 2014, Lyle was selected to compete for the United States at the 2014 FEI World Equestrian Games in Normandy. At the Games the United States placed fourth in team dressage. Returning four years later at the 2018 FEI World Equestrian Games, she was part of the American team which placed second in the team event, earning the silver medal in the team event.

== International Championship Results ==
Results
Year	Event	Horse	Score	Placing	Notes
2012	Olympic Games	Wizard	69.468%	35th	Individual
2014	World Equestrian Games	Wizard	72.000%	4th	Team
2014	World Equestrian Games	Wizard	69.202%	30th	Individual
2018	World Equestrian Games	Salvino	74.860%	2nd place, silver medalist(s)	Team
2018	World Equestrian Games	Salvino	69.043%	29th	Individual Special
2019	World Cup Final	Salvino	81.832%	7th	
2021	Olympic Games	Salvino	2504.0	2nd place, silver medalist(s)	Team
2021	Olympic Games	Salvino	qualified	WD	Individual
EL = Eliminated; RET = Retired; WD = Withdrew
