= Airisa Penele =

Latvian equestrian (born 1970)

Personal information
- Nationality: Latvian
- Born: 8 March 1970 (age 55) Riga, Latvia

Sport
- Sport: Equestrian

Airisa Penele (born 8 March 1970 Riga, Latvia) is a Latvian dressage rider. She competed at the 2009 FEI European Championships, becoming the first dressage rider representing Latvia at a continental dressage championship. Penele was close to an Olympic spot for the 2008 Olympic Games by obtaining the required qualifying scores, but only one Central European rider was able to compete at the Olympics, in which Penele was not chosen.
