= John Hindle (businessman) =

British Olympic hockey player (1934–2012)

Personal information
- Born: 20 November 1934
- Died: 4 October 2012 (aged 87)
- Height: 165 cm (5 ft 5 in)
- Weight: 70 kg (154 lb)

Sport
- Sport: Field hockey
Senior career
Years	Team	Caps	Goals
1954–1967	Preston	-	-
1968–1976	Bowdon	-	-
National team
Years	Team	Caps	Goals
–	Great Britain		-
–	England		-

For the Australian politician, see John Hindle.

John A. Hindle (20 November 1934 – 4 October 2012) was a British Olympic Games hockey player and later a property developer

== Biography ==
Hindle was born on 20 November 1934. Hindle played club hockey for Preston Hockey Club and became their first international player after making his England international debut against Scotland on 6 April 1957.

Hindle played hockey for Great Britain, representing the country at the 1960 and 1964 Olympic Games. Great Britain came fourth in the hockey tournament at the 1960 Olympics, so he missed out on a medal.

He later played for Bowdon Hockey Club and made his 100th appearances for Lancashire in February 1969.

Hindle was a Director of Brookhouse Properties from 1996 to 2012. In 2005, the Sunday Times estimated his net worth at GBP£102 million. Hindle resided in Sale, Greater Manchester. He had a daughter, Emma Hindle, an equestrian who has competed for Great Britain in Dressage at both the Athens and Beijing Olympic Games. Hindle died in 2012. Emma now runs his property business.
