= Salvino (horse) =

Salvino (born on April 30, 2007) was formerly a horse ridden for the United States by Adrienne Lyle. Salvino and Lyle won several medals.

== Early life ==
Salvino was born on April 30, 2007. Salvino was moved to Spain and had joined a competition as a five-year old.

== Career ==
Lyle and Salvino was in the USA team at the 2018 World Equestrian Games in Tryon. Lyle and Salvino won team silver.

On February 8 2024, Salvino had a colic. Because of this, Adrienne Lyle had to go out of competition for a temporary amount of time.

Lyle and Salvino got went to the U.S.A. team for the 2022 World Championships in Herning. Lyle and Salvino was named for the US International Equestrian Athlete of the Year 2022.

== Retirement ==
On April 4 2024, Salvino was retired by Betsy Juliano. Salvino, a Hanoverian horse, is now a breeding stallion in Wellington and Colorado.

== See also ==
- Adrienne Lyle
