= Susanne Lebek =

German dressage rider

Personal information
- Full name: Susanne Lebek
- Born: November 5, 1986 (age 39)
Medal record
Equestrian
Representing Germany
European Championships
Bronze medal – third place	2009 Windsor	Team dressage

Susanne Lebek (born 5 November 1986) is a German dressage rider. She won a team bronze medal at the 2009 FEI European Championships aboard Potomac.
