= Anna Merveldt =

Irish equestrian

Personal information
- Full name: Anna Merveldt-Steffens
- Nationality: Irish
- Born: 20 September 1962 (age 63) Maple Ridge, British Columbia, Canada

Sport
- Country: Ireland
- Sport: Equestrian

Achievements and titles
- Olympic finals: London 2012

Anna "Peetzy" Merveldt-Steffens (born 20 September 1962 in Maple Ridge, British Columbia, Canada) is an Irish dressage rider competing at the Olympic level. She competed at the 2012 Summer Olympics in the Individual dressage.
