= Anabel Balkenhol =

German dressage rider

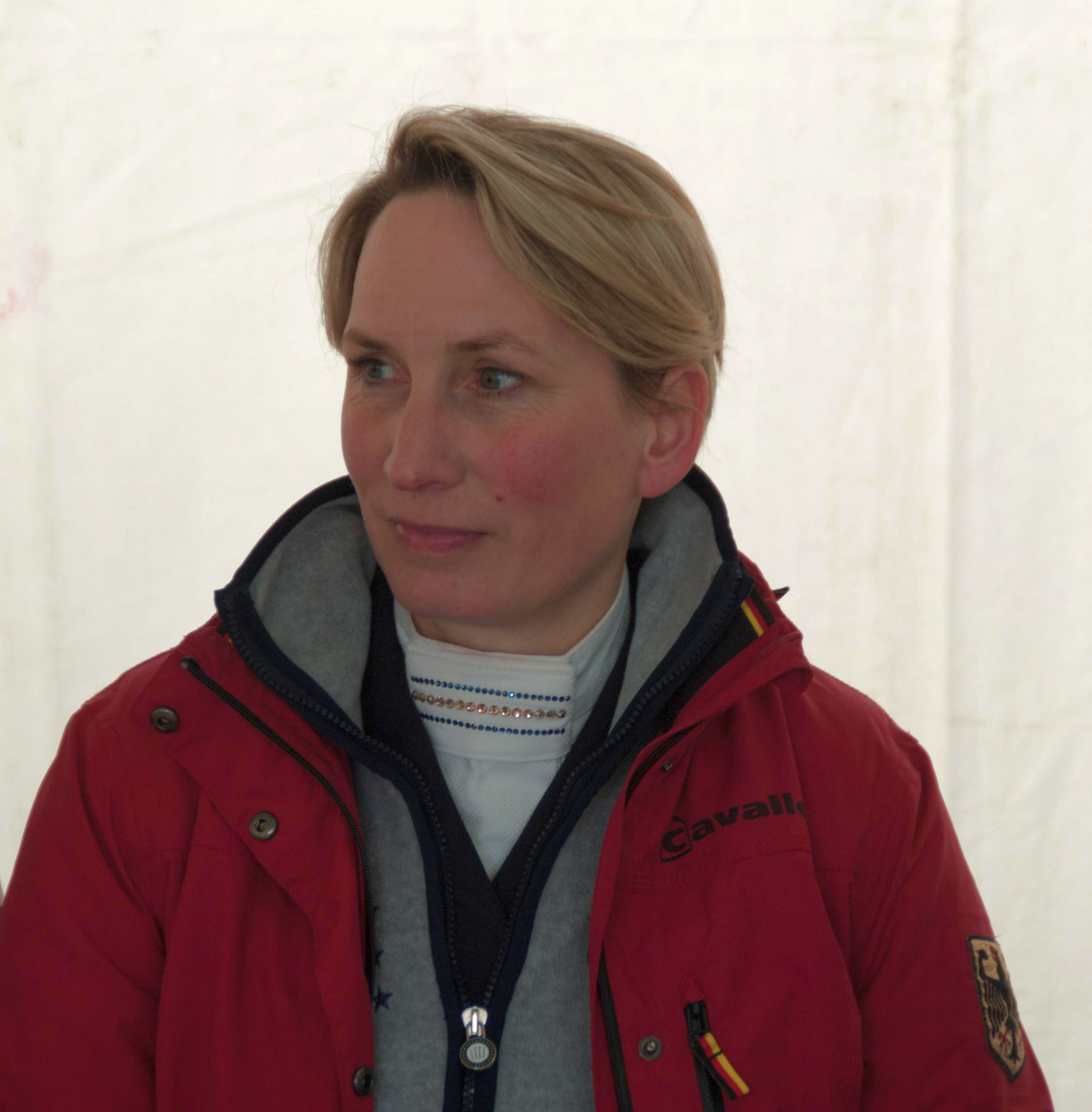
- Balkenhol in 2013

Personal information
- Born: 8 April 1972 (age 54); Hilden, West Germany
Medal record
Equestrian
Representing Germany
World Championships
Bronze medal – third place	2010 Kentucky	Team dressage

Anabel Balkenhol (born April 8, 1972, in Hilden, Germany) is a German Olympic dressage rider. Representing Germany, she competed at the 2012 Summer Olympics in London where she finished 19th in the individual competition.

She also competed at the 2010 World Equestrian Games in Kentucky where she won a bronze medal in team dressage and finished 8th in the Grand Prix Special dressage competition.

== Biography ==
Balkenhol is the daughter of Klaus Balkenhol, a multiple Olympic medalist. After leaving school and graduating from high school in 1993, Balkenhol studied special education.

In 1999, she graduated as an office clerk from the German Equestrian Federation, and then moved to the United States where she lived from 2000 to 2002.
