= Alexis Hellyer =

Australian dressage rider

Personal information
- Nationality: Australian
- Born: March 30, 1989 (age 36)

Sport
- Country: Australia
- Sport: Dressage

Achievements and titles
- World finals: 2018 FEI World Equestrian Games

Alexis Hellyer is an Australian Dressage rider. She competed at the 2018 FEI World Equestrian Games in Tryon, North Carolina. She has won several international Grand Prix's in Australia with her horse Floreno. She runs an equestrian business in Moggill, Queensland, Australia.
