= Claudia Fassaert =

Belgian Olympic dressage rider

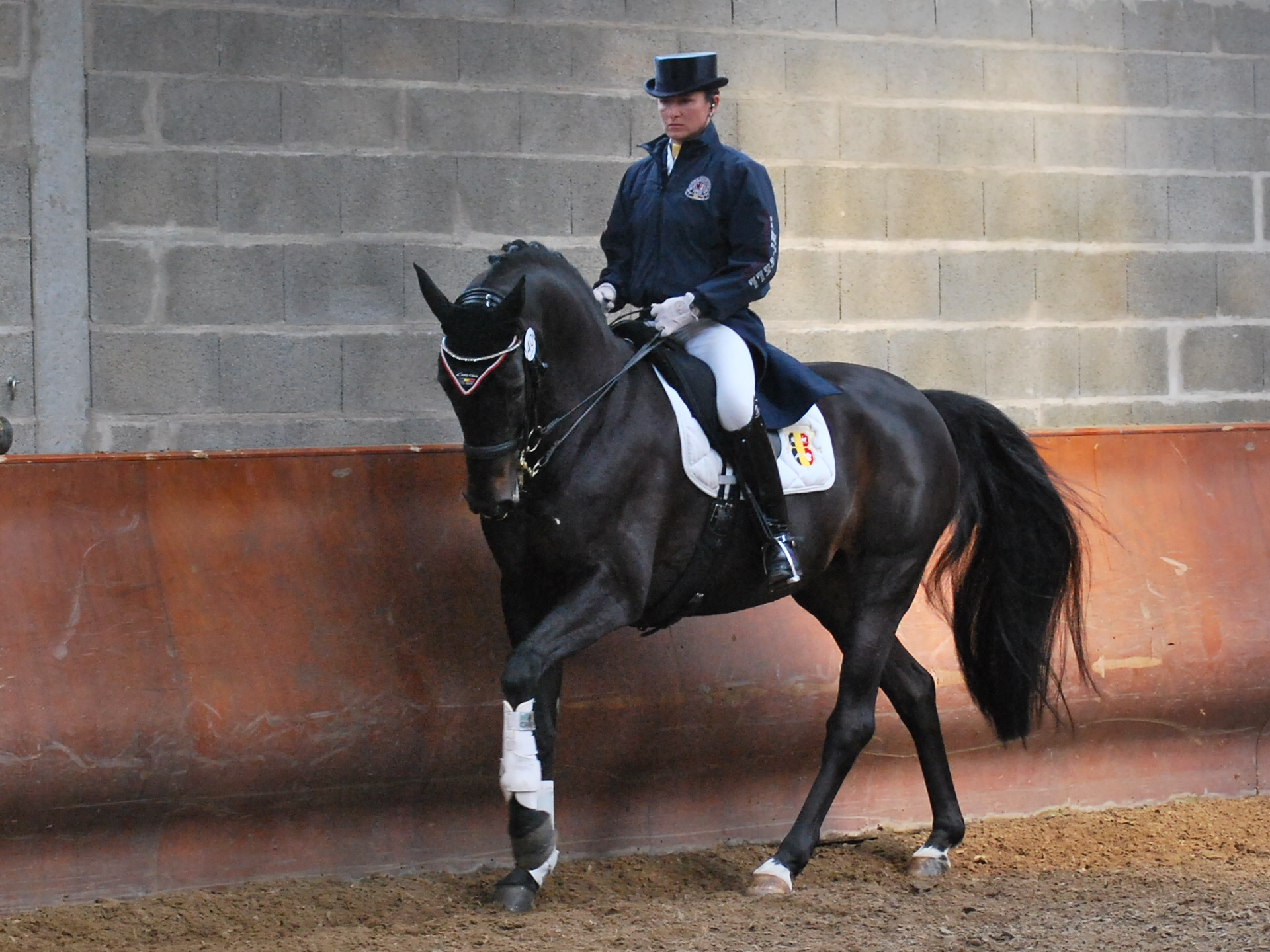
- Fassaert in 2012

Personal information
- Born: 11 July 1970 (age 54); Hontenisse, The Netherlands

Claudia Fassaert (born 11 July 1970, in Hontenisse, Netherlands) is a Belgian Olympic dressage rider. Representing Belgium, she competed at the 2012 Summer Olympics in London where she finished 27th in the individual competition.

She also competed at two World Equestrian Games (in 2010 and 2014) and at two European Dressage Championships (in 2011 and 2013). Her current best championship result is 7th place in team dressage from the 2011 European Dressage Championship while her current best individual result is 14th place in freestyle dressage from the same championship.
