= Svetlana Kiseliova =

Ukrainian equestrian

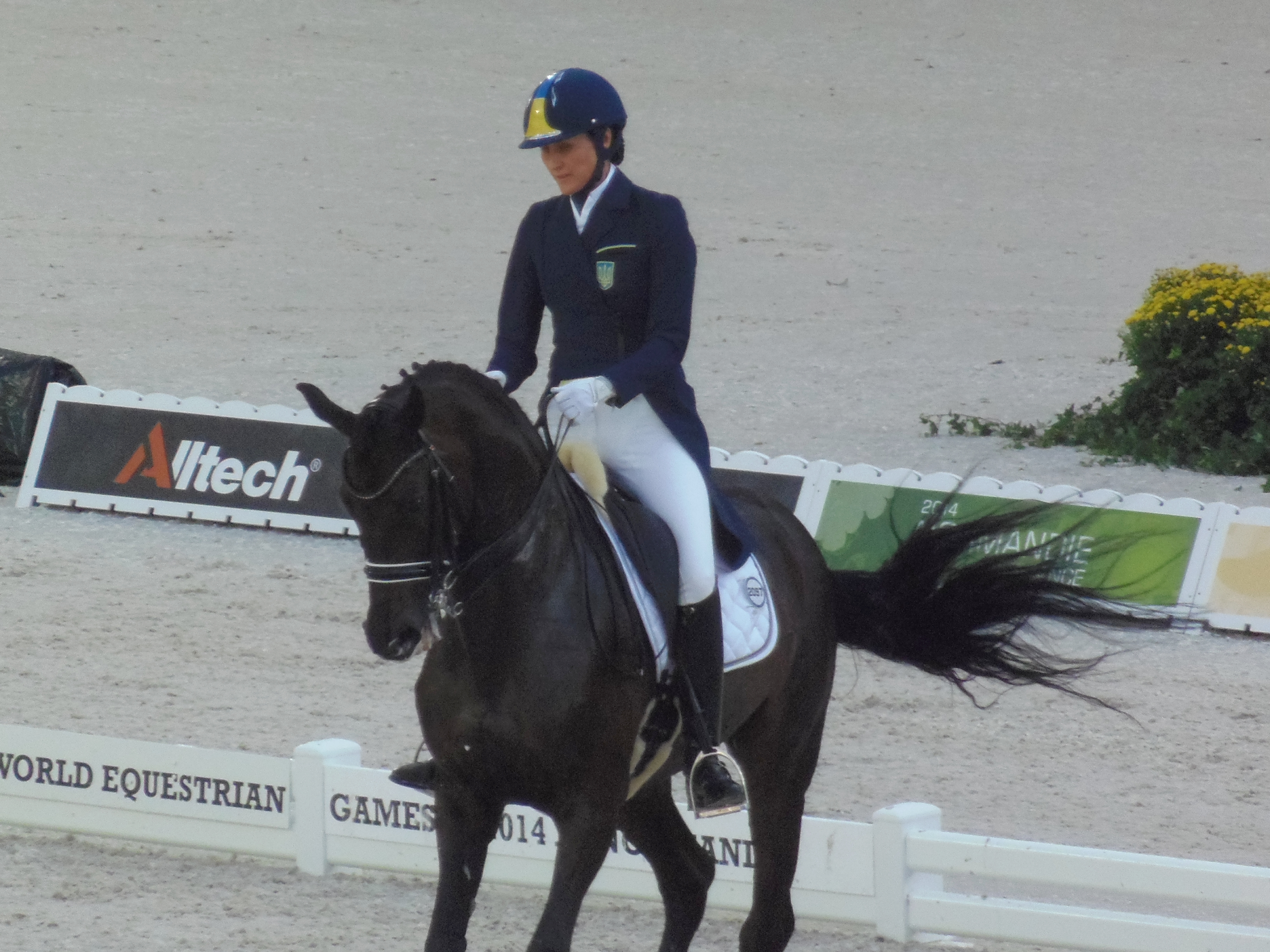
Svetlana Kiseliova and Parish (2014 FEI World Equestrian Games)

Svitlana Ivanivna Kyselyova (Ukrainian: Світлана Іванівна Кисельова; born 25 August 1971) is a Ukrainian dressage rider. She represented Ukraine at the 2012 Summer Olympics in the individual dressage, finishing 46th.
