= Emma Hindle =

British equestrian (born 1975)

Medal record

Equestrian

Representing Great Britain

European Championships
Silver medal – second place	2009 Windsor	Team dressage
Bronze medal – third place	2003 Hickstead	Team dressage

Emma Hindle (born 19 May 1975) is a British international equestrian. She first rode for her country in 2004, competing in the World Equestrian Games of that year, and competed for Great Britain in Dressage at both the Athens and Beijing Olympic Games.

== Early life ==
Hindle was born in Preston, Lancashire on 19 May 1975, the daughter of multimillionaire property developer John Hindle. After riding a donkey on the beach at Blackpool aged four, she began taking regular riding lessons at her aunt's stables. She began competitive showing in Working hunter classes, followed by eventing.

== Career ==
Aged 12, Hindle was under instruction from international dressage judge Stephen Clarke and at 18 she moved to Sweden to train with Kyra Kyrklund at the Flyinge Stud.

When Kyrklund moved to the UK in 1993, Hindle moved to the base of Netherlands Olympic dressage medallist Ellen Bontje in Frankfurt, Germany. It was from this base that she competed in the Beijing Olympics.

Now running the Brookhouse Stud in Erbach, Hessen, Hindle is part of the London 2012 World Class Performance Programme.

== Results ==
Games	Age	Sport	Event	Team	Position
Athens Summer Olympics 2004		Equestrianism	Individual Dressage	Great Britain	8
Athens Summer Olympics 2004		Equestrianism	Mixed Dressage, Team	Great Britain	8
Beijing Summer Olympics 2008		Equestrianism	Individual Dressage	Great Britain	8
Beijing Summer Olympics 2008		Equestrianism	Individual Grand Prix Dressage	Great Britain	8
Beijing Summer Olympics 2008		Equestrianism	Mixed Dressage, Team	Great Britain	8

== Personal life ==
She has a son Luke, and following her father's death, she is running his property business.
