= Maria Caetano =

Portuguese dressage rider (born 1986)

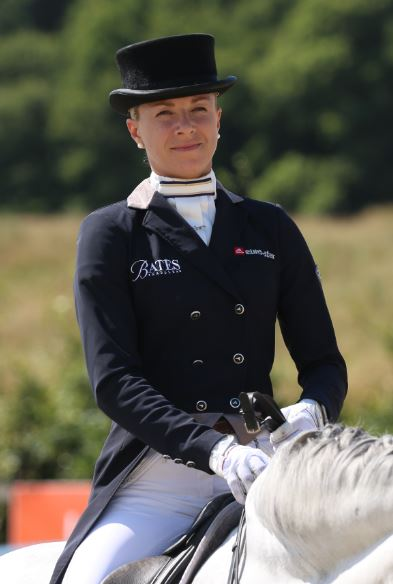
- Caetano in 2018

Personal information
- Full name: Maria da Conceição Cortes de Moura Padrão Caetano
- Born: 7 November 1986 (age 39) Monforte, Portugal
- Height: 1.67 m (5 ft 6 in)
- Weight: 59 kg (130 lb)
- Life partner: Antonio Gomes Pereira

Sport
- Country: Portugal
- Sport: Equestrian
- Coached by: Kyra Kyrklund (FIN), Ton de Ridder (NED), Paulo Caetano (POR)

Maria da Conceição Cortes de Moura Padrão Caetano (born 7 November 1986) is a Portuguese dressage rider. She competed at two World Equestrian Games (in 2014 and 2018), and at six European Dressage Championships, from 2009 through 2018.

Caetano's current career-high championship result is 6th place achieved in team dressage at the 2017 European Championships. Her best individual finish is 21nd place from the same event.

Caetano was selected to represent Portugal at the 2020 and 2024 Olympic Games.

== Dressage results ==
=== Olympic Games ===
Event	Team	Individual	Freestyle	Horse
(Japan) Tokyo 2020	7th	27th	—	Fenix de Tineo
(France) Paris 2024				Hit Plus

=== World Championships ===
Event	Team	Individual	Freestyle	Horse
(France) 2014 Normandy	16th	59th	—	Xiripiti
(United States) 2018 Tryon	12th	23rd	—	Coroado
(Denmark) 2022 Herning	10th	36th	—	Fenix de Tineo

=== European Championships ===
Event	Team	Individual	Freestyle	Horse
(United Kingdom) 2009 Windsor	9th	45th	—	Diamant
(Netherlands) 2011 Rotterdam	12th	36th	—	Xiripiti
(Denmark) 2013 Herning	11th	34th	—	Xiripiti
(Germany) 2015 Aachen	11th	69th	—	Xiripiti
(Sweden) 2017 Gothenburg	6th	22nd	—	Coroado
(Netherlands) 2019 Rotterdam	8th	23rd	—	Coroado
(Germany) 2023 Riesenbeck	10th	47th	—	Fenix de Tineo

=== World Cup ===
==== Final ====
Event	Score	Rank	Horse
(Sweden) 2019 Gothenburg	76.393%	13th	Coroado

==== Western European League ====
Season	Points	Rank
2018-19	59	7th Q
2019-20	17	36th

- Q - denotes qualification for the World Cup Final

==== Western European League podiums ====
3 podiums (0 gold, 1 silver, 2 bronze)

Season	Place	Placement	Horse
2018-19	(Spain) Madrid	3rd	Coroado
2018-19	(Belgium) Mechelen	3rd	Coroado
2019-20	(Belgium) Mechelen	2nd	Coroado
