= Isabel Cool =

Belgian equestrian

Personal information
- Born: Isabel Cool; Sep 17, 1985 (age 40)

Sport
- Country: Belgium
- Sport: Dressage

Achievements and titles
- World finals: 2018 FEI World Equestrian Games

Isabel Cool (born 17 September 1985) is a Belgian equestrian athlete. She competed at the 2018 FEI World Equestrian Games and at the European Dressage Championships in 2019.
