= Gonçalo Carvalho =

Portuguese dressage rider

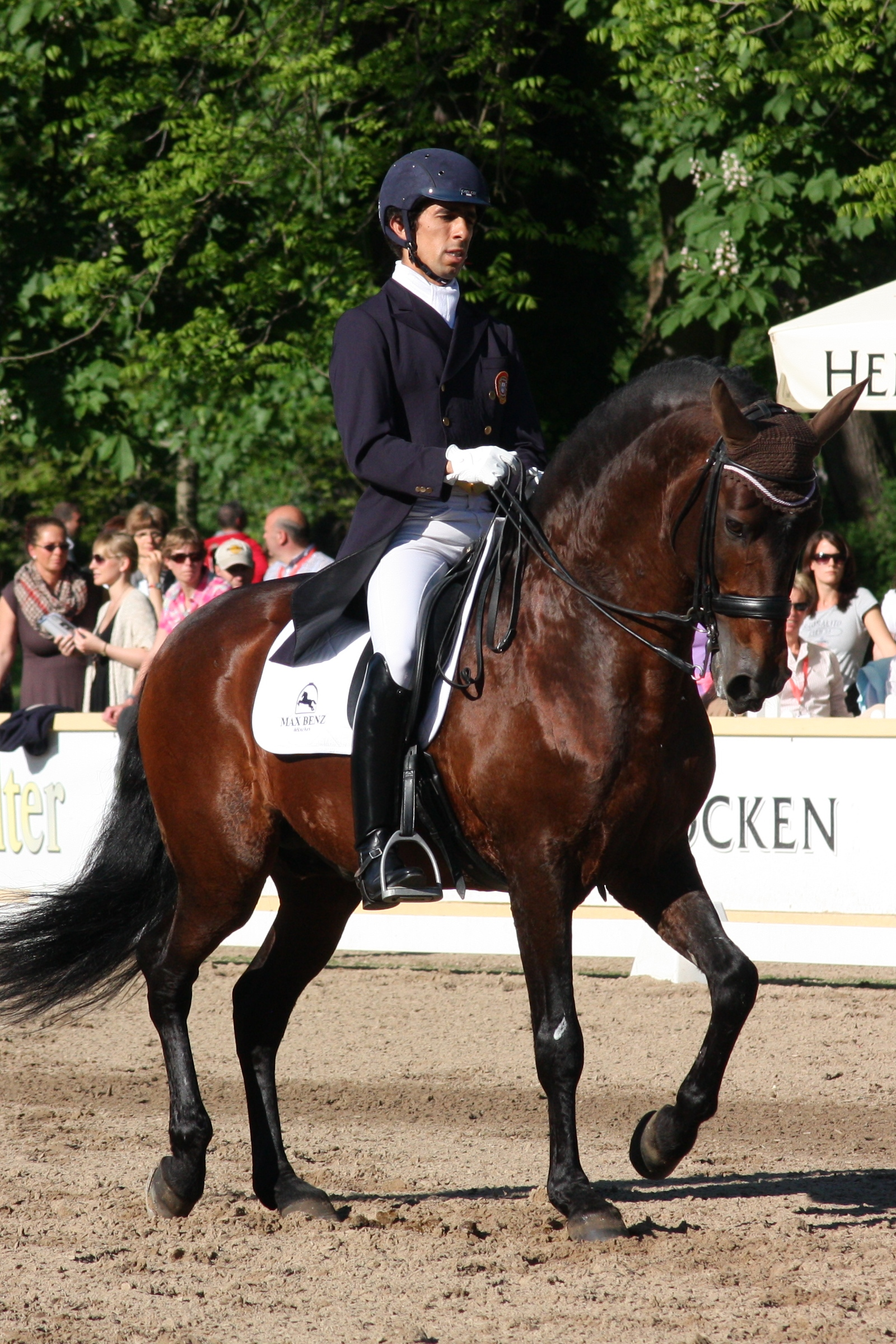
- Gonçalo Carvalho and Rubi (2013)

Personal information
- Born: 1 April 1982 (age 44) Lisbon, Portugal

Gonçalo Carvalho (born 1 April 1982 in Lisbon, Portugal) is a Portuguese Olympic dressage rider. Representing Portugal, he competed at the 2012 Summer Olympics in London where he finished 16th in the individual competition.

He also competed at the 2010 World Equestrian Games and at three European Dressage Championships (in 2011, 2013 and 2015). His current best championship result 11th place in team dressage at the 2013 European Dressage Championship and at the 2010 World Equestrian Games.
