= Juan Matute Guimon =

Spanish equestrian (born 1997)

Juan Matute Guímon
Personal information
- Full name: Juan Matute Guímon
- Nickname: Junior
- Born: 14 November 1997 (age 28) Madrid, Spain

Sport
- Sport: Equestrian
- Coached by: Juan Matute

Achievements and titles
- World finals: 2018 FEI World Equestrian Games
Medal record
Equestrian
Representing Spain
European Under 25 Championships
Bronze medal – third place	2017 Lamprechtshausen	Individual dressage
Bronze medal – third place	2016 Hagen	Individual dressage
European Junior Championships
Gold medal – first place	2015 Vidauban	Individual dressage

Juan Matute Guímon (born 14 November 1997 in Madrid) is a Spanish/American equestrian athlete. He competed at the World Equestrian Games in Tryon 2018 and at various European Youth Championships. His father Juan Matute competed at the 1988 Olympic Games, 1992 Olympic Games and the 1996 Olympic Games.

== Biography ==
Juan started riding at the age of 6 in Spain. In 2008 he moved to the United States where he relocated in Wellington, Florida where his father worked as a coach. In 2018 he gained the American citizenship after ten years living in the US. In 2018 he relocated back to Spain where he wanted to focus on his study International Relations at the Francisco de Vitoria University in Madrid and to establish his riding career in Europe. He started riding on the highest Dressage level already at an age of 16. He also represents the FEI at several media platforms and was the presenter of the FEI Awards in 2018 and 2019.

== Personal life ==
Juan's sister Paula Matute is also an international dressage rider and lives in Wellington. He has also a younger brother who does not compete. He is fluent in English Spanish and German.

His wife, Paloma Zafrilla, participated in season 14 of Masterchef Spain.

== Heavy accident ==
On Tuesday 5 May 2020 he was hospitalized with a Arteriovenous Malformation brain bleeding. When he had several headaches in the week before the accident, he felt unwell after he rode a horse. He then got off the horse, after which he collapsed. He was subsequently taken to hospital in a critical condition by helicopter to the La Paz Hospital in Madrid, where he was operated on for his brain haemorrhage. Juan was in an artificial coma for three weeks. On 3 July he left the hospital and was allowed to start his rehabilitation process.
