= Tina Konyot =

American equestrian

Tina Magdalena Konyot (born September 12, 1961, in Hollywood, Florida) is an American dressage rider.

She competed at the 2012 Summer Olympics where she finished 25th in the individual dressage and 6th in the team dressage competition. In 2013, Konyot was eliminated from the World Dressage Masters tournament in Palm Beach when fresh blood from a spur mark was found on her horse after her test. It was one of the first eliminations due to FEI's "blood rule" passed in 2012, garnering significant attention given the rule's recent passage.

Konyot qualified for the 2014 Dressage World Cup Final in Lyon after finishing 3rd overall in the 2013/14 North American League rankings.

In March 2024, she and J Everdale placed second at the Lövsta Future Challenge Series Final in Wellington, Florida.
