= Victoria Max-Theurer =

Austrian dressage rider

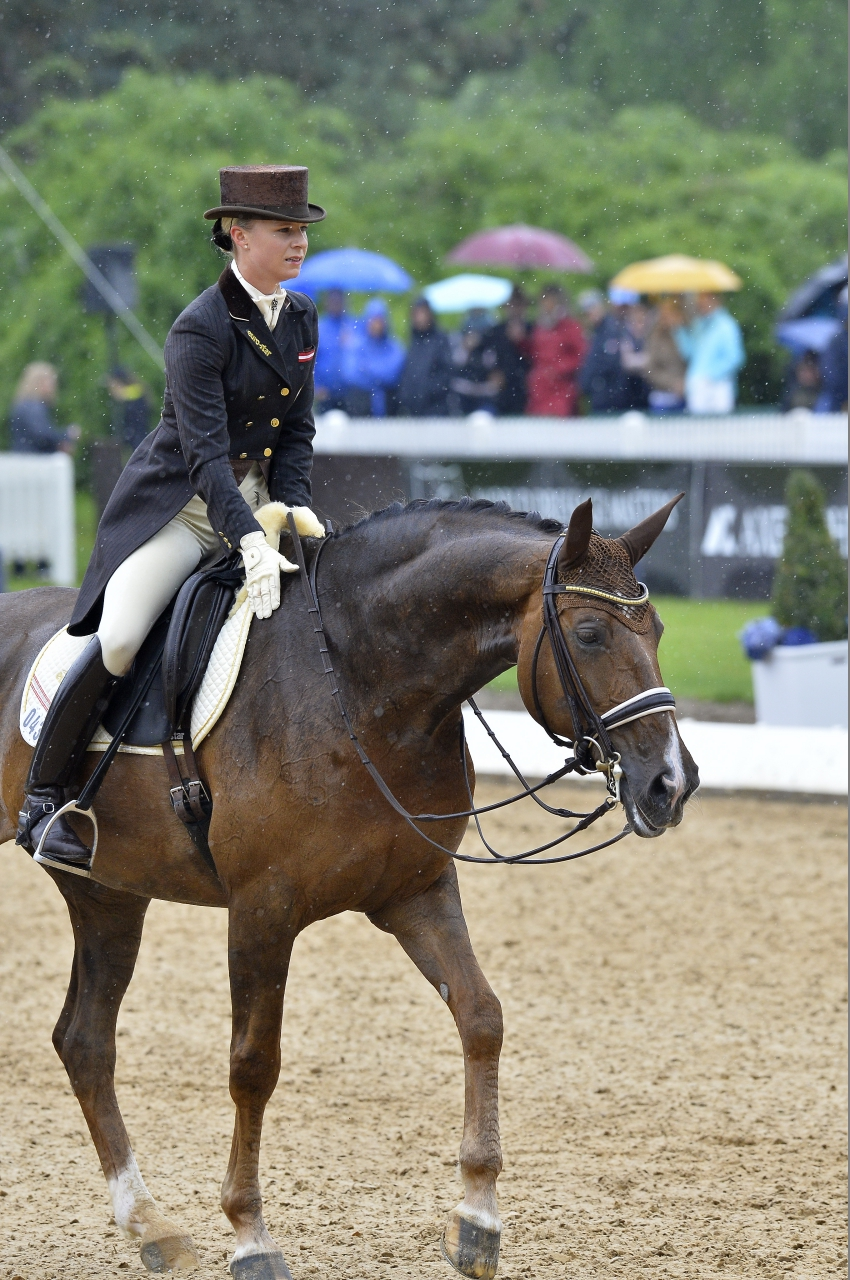
- Victoria Max-Theurer and Blind Date (2013)

Personal information
- Nickname: Vici
- Born: 24 October 1985 (age 40) Linz, Austria

Victoria "Vici" Max-Theurer (born 24 October 1985 in Linz, Austria) is an Austrian Olympic dressage rider. Representing Austria, she has competed in five Olympic Games (in 2004, 2008, 2012, 2016 and 2020). Her best Olympic result is 8th place, achieved in the team dressage competition in 2004, while her highest individual Olympic placement is 13th place from 2012.

She has also competed at two World Equestrian Games (2006 and 2014) and at nine European Dressage Championships (2003 - 2017, 2021). She placed 5th in both the special and freestyle individual competitions at the 2009 European Championships held at Windsor Castle.

In 2021, she withdrew from the Olympic competition just hours before the event because her horse had a dental problem.

She is the daughter of Elisabeth Theurer, the 1980 Olympic champion in individual dressage.

== Personal bests ==
Personal bests as of December 2014
Event	Score	Horse	Venue	Date
Grand Prix	78.553	Augustin	Achleiten, Austria	1 June 2012
Grand Prix Special	77.857	Augustin	Caen, France	27 August 2014
Grand Prix Freestyle	83.050	Augustin	Achleiten, Austria	2 June 2012

== Notable horses ==
- Falcao - 1987 Grey Gelding (Jaquetao x Zina)
  - 2004 Athens Olympics - Team 8th place, Individual 20th place
  - 2005 European Championships - Team 10th place, Individual 21st place
- Weinrausch - 1992 Bay Hannoverian Gelding (Walt Disney x Darling)
  - 2003 European Championships - Individual 26th place
- Falcao OLD - 1992 Bay Oldenburg Gelding (Feiner Stern x Odienne)
  - 2007 European Championships - Team 8th place, Special 12th place, Freestyle 12th place
  - 2008 Beijing Olympics - Individual 27th place
- Augustin OLD - 2000 Bay Oldenburg Stallion (August Der Starke x Rohdiamant)
  - 2009 European Championships - Special 5th place, Freestyle 5th place, Team 6th place
  - 2012 London Olympics - Individual 13th place
  - 2013 European Championships - Team 6th place, Freestyle 10th place, Special 12th place
  - 2014 World Championships - Special 6th place, Freestyle 6th place, Team 8th place
- Blind Date - 2002 Chestnut Hannoverian Mare (Breitling W x Donnerhall)
  - 2015 European Championships - Team 9th place, Special 21st place
  - 2017 European Championships - Team 9th place, Individual 34th place
- Della Cavelleria OLD - 2003 Bay Brown Oldenburg Mare (Diamond Hit x Rubinstein I)
  - 2016 Rio Olympics - Individual 34th place
