= Riccardo Sanavio =

Italian dressage rider

Personal information
- Nationality: Italian
- Born: April 8, 1990 (age 36)

Sport
- Country: Italy
- Sport: Dressage

Achievements and titles
- World finals: 2018 FEI World Equestrian Games

Riccardo Sanavio is an Italian Dressage rider. He competed at the 2018 FEI World Equestrian Games in Tryon, North Carolina and at several European Championships in the Young Riders division in 2008, 2009 and 2011. He is based in The Netherlands and has worked for former world champion Edward Gal and Hans-Peter Minderhoud.
