= Ellen Schulten-Baumer =

German dressage rider (born 1979)

Personal information
- Full name: Ellen Schulten-Baumer
- Nationality: German
- Born: 22 March 1979 (age 47) Rheinberg, Germany

Sport
- Country: Germany
- Sport: Equestrian
Medal record
Equestrian
Representing Germany
European Championships
Silver medal – second place	2007 La Mandria	Team dressage
Bronze medal – third place	2009 Windsor	Team dressage

Ellen Schulten-Baumer (born 22 March 1979) is a German dressage rider who competed at the 2007 and 2009 European Championships where she won team silver and bronze. She competed also at the 2006 World Cup Finals in Amsterdam and was selected for the 2008 Olympic Games to represent Germany but she had to withdraw because of an injury of her horse Donatha S.

Ellen's stepfather is the legendary dressage rider and trainer Uwe Schulten-Baumer who represented Germany and West-Germany during several World and European Championships. He won double gold at the World Equestrian Games and six times gold during the European Championships. He also coached former Olympic champions Isabell Werth and Nicole Uphoff.
