= Gretha Ferreira =

South African dressage rider (born 1989)

Personal information
- Full name: Gretha Ferreira
- Nationality: South African
- Born: 23 June 1989 (age 37) Pretoria, South Africa

Sport
- Country: South Africa
- Sport: Equestrian
- Coached by: Ulrike Nivelle

Achievements and titles
- World finals: 2018 World Equestrian Games

Gretha Ferreira (born 23 June 1989 in Pretoria, South Africa) is a South African dressage rider. She competed at the 2018 World Equestrian Games in Tryon, where she placed 66th in the individual dressage competition.

In October 2019, she qualified for the Tokyo Olympics with the South African team during a special Olympic qualifier event in Exloo, Netherlands.
