= Ismail Jilaoui =

Moroccan dressage rider

Personal information
- Nationality: Moroccan, French
- Born: December 20, 1978 (age 47)

Sport
- Country: Morocco
- Sport: Dressage

Achievements and titles
- World finals: 2018 FEI World Equestrian Games

Ismail Jilaoui is a French born Moroccan Dressage rider. He competed at the 2018 FEI World Equestrian Games in Tryon, North Carolina and has qualified as individual rider for the 2020 Summer Olympics in Tokyo, Japan.
