= Katarzyna Milczarek =

Polish dressage rider

Personal information
- Full name: Katarzyna Milczarek-Jasińska
- Nickname: Kasia
- Born: 2 September 1965 (age 60) Warsaw, Poland
- Height: 168 cm (5 ft 6 in)

Sport
- Country: Poland
- Sport: Equestrian
- Event: Dressage
- Club: KSJ Zagozd, Poland

Achievements and titles
- Olympic finals: London 2012; Paris 2024

Katarzyna Milczarek-Jasińska (born 2 September 1965 in Warsaw) is a Polish dressage rider. She represented Poland at the 2012 Summer Olympics in the team and individual dressage.

Her coach is Ernst Hoyos, she is a part of the equestrian club KSJ Zagozd.

She started with her horse Ekwador in 2009 FEI European Championships, in 2011 European Dressage Championships, and in 2012 Kentucky Derby. She also qualified for 2012 Summer Olympics in London, where she took 38th place in an individual contest and 8th place in a team contest.

In October 2022, Milczarek was suspended by the International Federation for Equestrian Sports after testing positive for a prohibited substance at competitions in Spring and Summer 2022. Milczarek took responsibility for the incident, explaining the result was unintentional as the substance was found in her medication to alleviate menopause symptoms.

In 2024, she was selected to represent Poland in the 2024 Summer Olympic Games. Milczarek became the oldest Olympian in Polish history at 58 years and 332 days old during her appearance in Paris.
