= Hubert Perring =

French equestrian

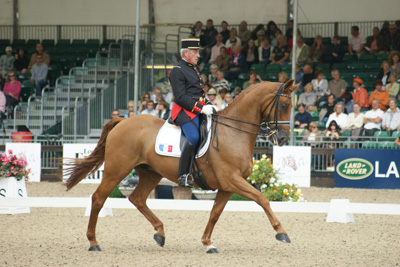
- Hubert Perring in 2009

Personal information
- Nationality: French
- Born: 19 January 1957 (age 68); Auxerre, France

Sport
- Sport: Equestrian

Hubert Perring (born 19 January 1957) is a French equestrian. He competed in two events at the 2008 Summer Olympics.
