= ECCO =

Danish shoe manufacturer

ECCO Sko A/S

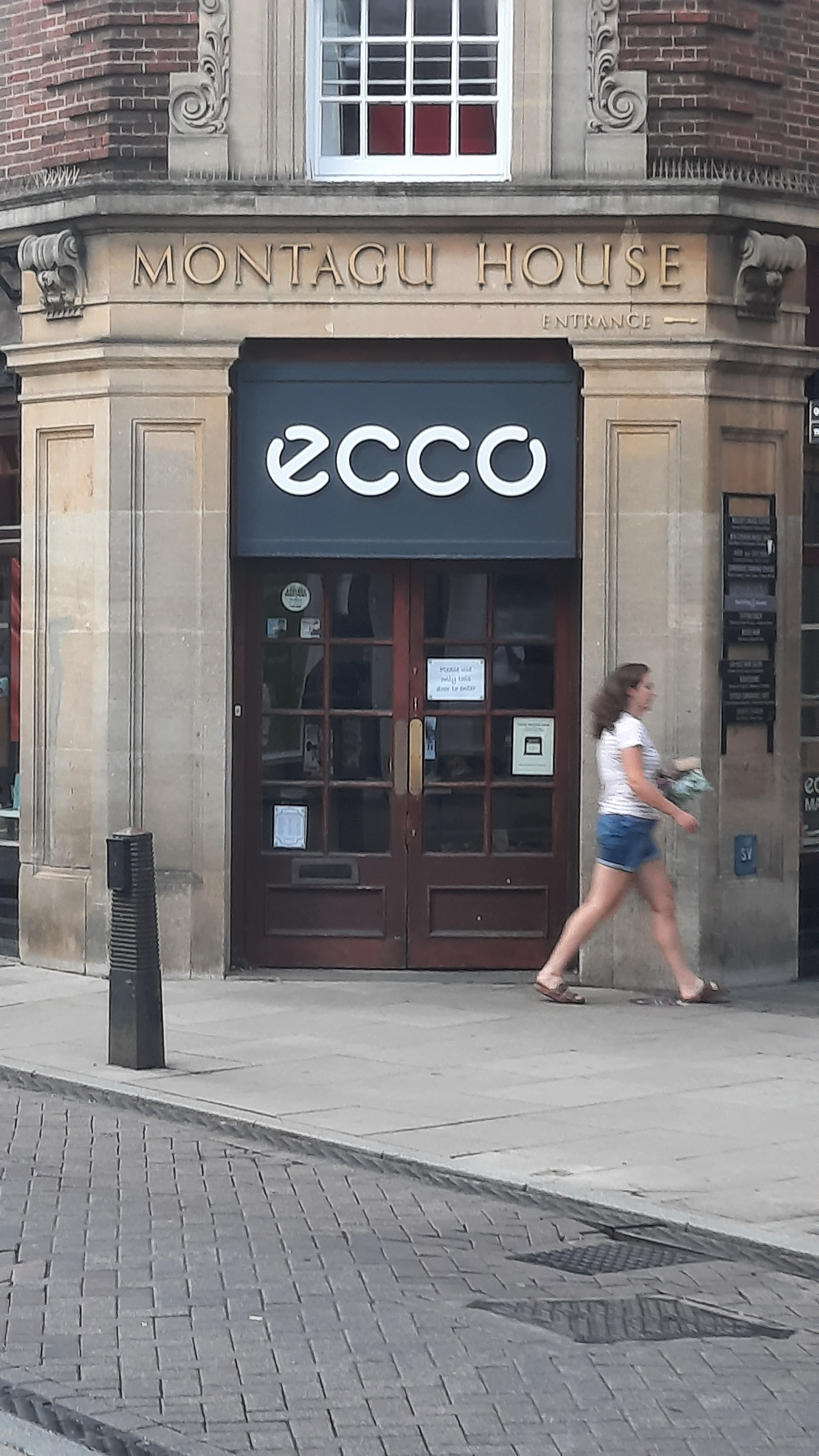
- ecco shoes, Cambridge, England, July 2025
- Company type: Aktieselskab
- Founded: 1 April 1963; 63 years ago (as A/S Bredebro Skofabrik)
- Founder: Karl Toosbuy
- Headquarters: Bredebro, Denmark
- Key people: Thomas Gøgsig (CEO); Hanni Toosbuy (Chairman)
- Products: Shoes, leather, and accessories
- Revenue: €1.09 billion (2020)
- Net income: €23.14 million (2020)
- Total assets: €1.32 billion (2020)
- Number of employees: 21,434 (2020)
- Website: global.ecco.com

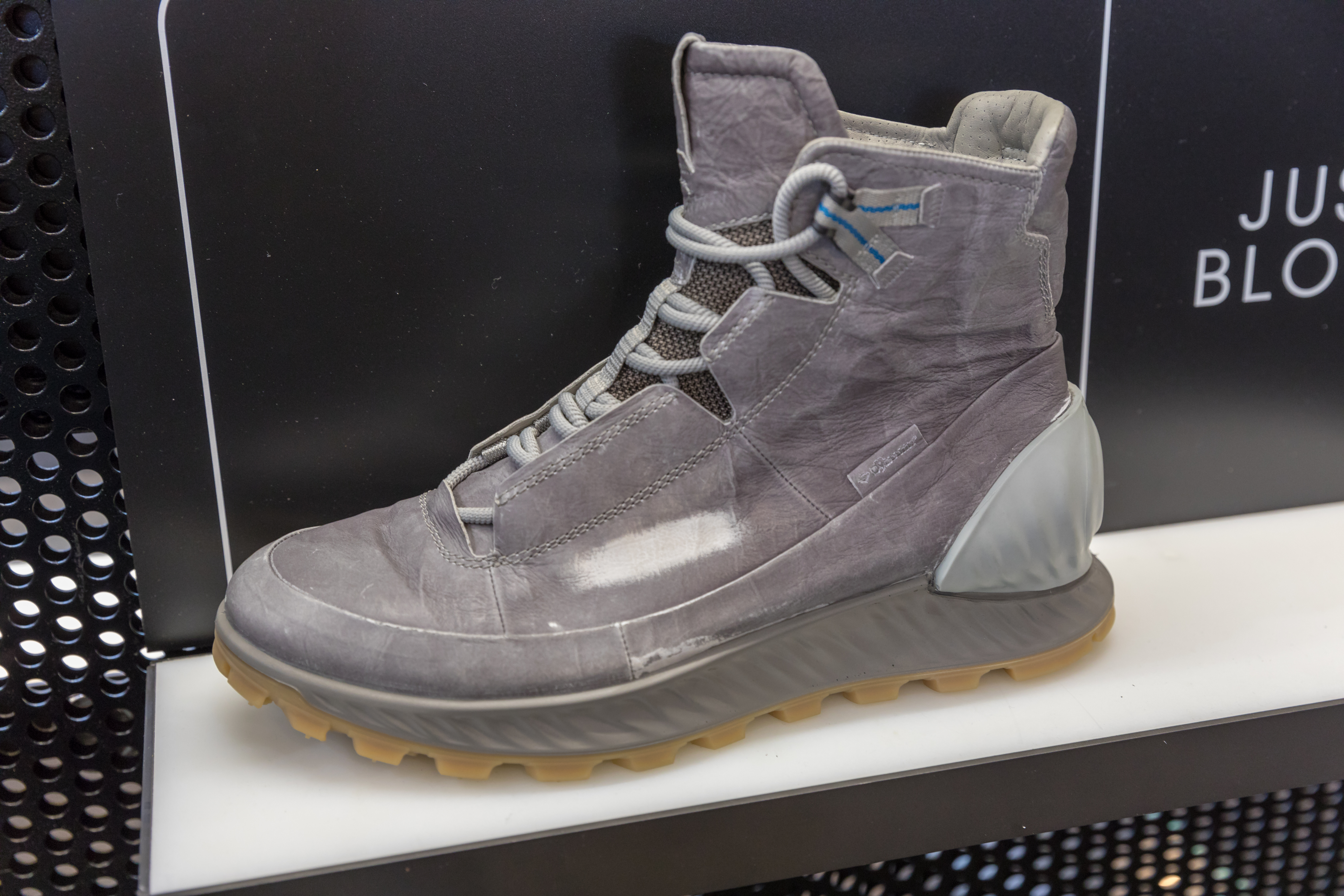
Ecco leather boot

ECCO Sko A/S is a Danish shoe and leather accessories manufacturer founded in 1963 by Karl Toosbuy, in Bredebro, Denmark. ECCO opened its first retail store in Denmark in 1982. ECCO is family-owned and employs 21,300 people worldwide, with product sales in 101 countries from over 2,250 shops and more than 14,000 sales points.

== History ==
ECCO was established in 1963 by Karl Toosbuy in the small town of Bredebro in southern Denmark. Throughout the 1980s, the company expanded its operations internationally. By 1982, sales reached 1 million pairs of shoes annually. In order to accommodate the increasing demand, additional production was established in Portugal, and under license in Japan and Cyprus. ECCO built its own research and design center, named "Futura", in Denmark in 1996, since 2009 Portugal is the R&D center of ECCO and opened its own beamhouse in Indonesia and tannery in Thailand a few years later. In 1998 the first flagship retail store opened on Oxford Street, in London. By 2000, ECCO owned every step of the production process, from design and leather production to branded retail sales.

== Production ==
ECCO owns tanneries in the Netherlands, Thailand, Indonesia and China. ECCO’s tanneries are among the leading manufacturers of leather to the fashion, sports, and car industries. ECCO has engaged in a research program to reduce the environmental impact of the tanning process. Approximately 98% of ECCO's shoes are produced in its own shoe factories in Portugal, Slovakia, Thailand, Indonesia, Vietnam and China, and some under licence in India.

== International ==
ECCO shoes and leather goods are sold in 101 countries worldwide. The company operates through more than 6,250 mono-brand stores, independent retailers and online sales.

== Controversies ==
In 1998, ECCO faced problems with a large quantity of shoes. Due to a production fault involving the composition of sole material – hydrolysis of the molded polyurethane – the soles disintegrated after only one to five years. After discovering the source of the problem, ECCO changed the composition of its sole material.

In 2016 Adidas filed a trademark suit against ECCO in American courts. However, in 2018, Adidas voluntarily dismissed its claims.

In March 2022, ECCO decided to continue its operations in Russia despite the invasion of Ukraine and heavy sanctions directed towards Russia by Western nations. As a consequence, ECCO lost its 30 year long status as purveyor to the Danish royal family.
