= Ellesse Gundersen =

Philippines equestrian

Personal information
- Born: Ellesse Jordan Tzinberg; December 17, 1991 (age 34) Kuala Lumpur, Malaysia
- Website: http://www.ellessejordan.com

Sport
- Country: United States
- Sport: Equestrian

Achievements and titles
- World finals: 2018 World Equestrian Games

Ellesse Jordan Gundersen (née Tzinberg; born 17 December 1991 in Kuala Lumpur, Malaysia) is an American (since switching from Philippines to USA in 2023) equestrian athlete. She competed at the 2018 World Equestrian Games and at the 2018 World Cup Final aboard her horse Triviant. She became the first Filipino athlete to compete at the major dressage championships. Since switching to represent the USA in international dressage, Ellesse went on to win the first ever US Grand Prix Championships in 2026 with her horse Quintessential 4.

== Biography ==
Ellesse Gundersen is born to an American-Australian father and a Filipino-Spanish mother. She started riding at an age of six, and competed already aged 12 in both dressage and show jumping. In 2008, she moved to the United States, where she started an equestrian scholarship at the Kansas State University. In 2009, she received her university degree at the University of San Diego. Her international equestrian career started at the age of 23 in Europe.

== Personal life ==
Ellesse Gundersen is married to Henrik Gundersen and is the mother of a son Christian. They live in Wellington, Florida. She is fluent in English, Filipino, French, Malay and Danish.

== Modelling ==
In 2010, she was scouted as a model while she visited Paris. She was offered a modelling contract to work as a professional. After working a full season as a model, she signed a contract for a modelling agency based in Los Angeles. After four years of modelling, she decided to return to the equestrian world to focus on her professional equestrian career.

== Dressage results ==
=== World Championships ===
Event	Individual	Freestyle	Horse
(United States) 2018 Tryon	74th	—	Triviant

=== World Cup ===
==== Final ====
Event	Score	Rank	Horse
(France) 2018 Paris		18th	Triviant
