= Emma Kanerva Teufert =

Finnish equestrian (born 1985)

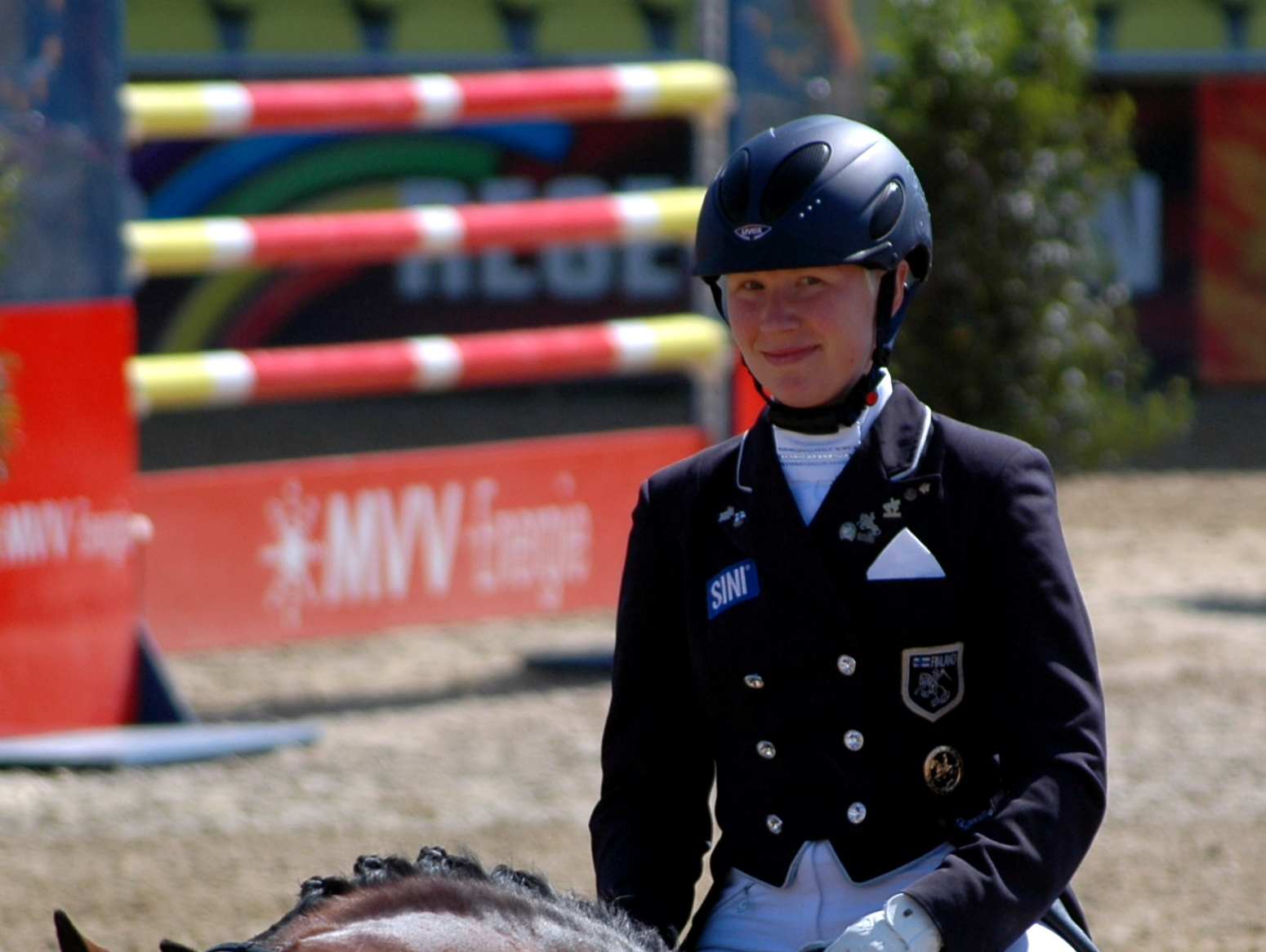
- Kanerva in 2014

Personal information
- Born: Emma Kanerva; 13 July 1985 (age 40) Mikkeli, Finland
- Height: 168 cm (5 ft 6 in)
- Spouse: Nils Teufert (m. 2026)

Sport
- Country: Finland
- Sport: Equestrian
- Event: Dressage

Achievements and titles
- Olympic finals: London 2012; Paris 2024
- World finals: Lexington 2010; Tryon 2018

Emma Kanerva Teufert (née Kanerva; born 13 July 1985) is a Finnish dressage rider. She represented Finland in the 2012 Summer Olympics in London, finishing 22nd. She also competed at the World Equestrian Games in 2010 and 2018. Kanerva Teufert represented Finland five times during the European Championships in 2011, 2013, 2015, 2021 and 2023.

In 2024 Kanerva Teufert represented the Finnish team at the 2024 Olympic Games in Paris with her horse Greek Air. She finished 7th in the team competition and 12th in the individual freestyle. She was the first Finnish dressage rider after Kyra Kyrklund to make it to the freestyle final at the Olympic Games.

== Personal life ==
Kanerva married Nils Teufert on 16 May 2026.
