= Jordi Domingo =

Spanish equestrian

Personal information
- Nationality: Spanish
- Born: 1 August 1981 (age 43); Barcelona, Spain

Sport
- Sport: Equestrian

Jordi Domingo Coll (born 1 August 1981) is a Spanish equestrian. He competed in the individual dressage event at the 2008 Summer Olympics.
