= Jeroen Devroe =

Belgian equestrian

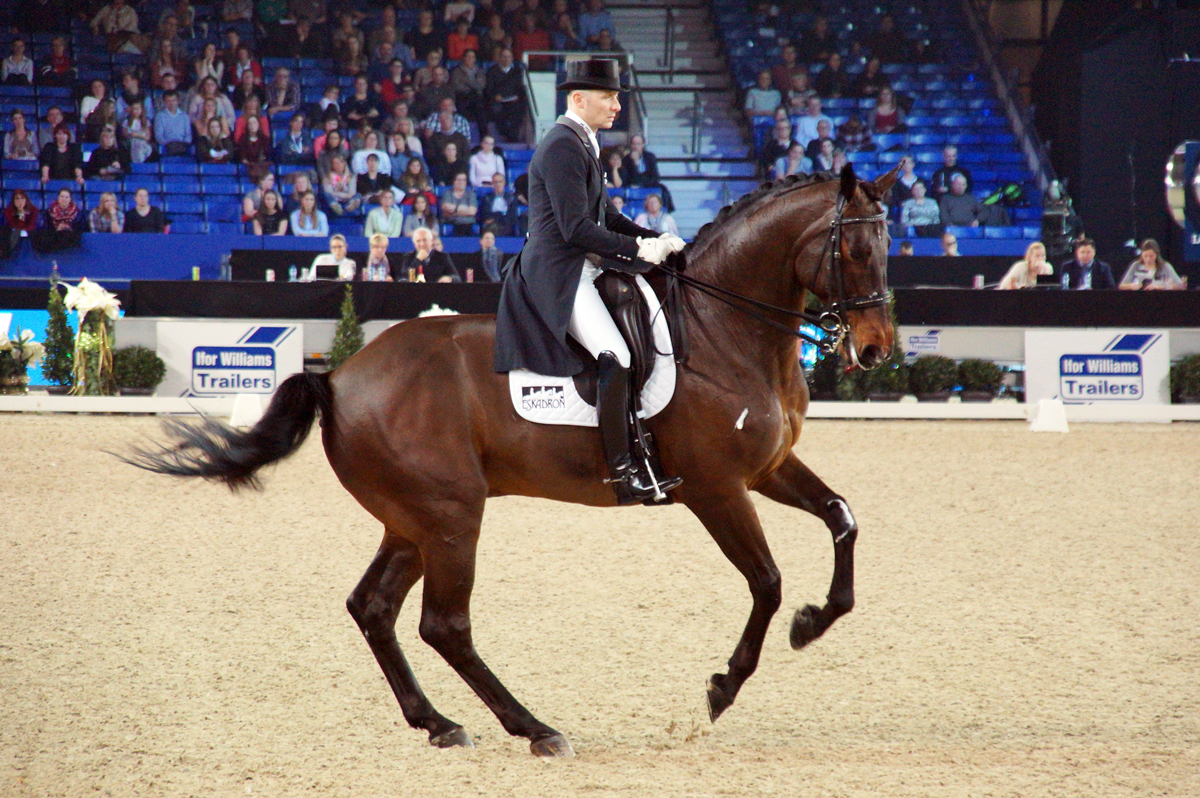
- Jeroen Devroe and Eres DL (2015)

Personal information
- Born: October 30, 1969 (age 56)

Jeroen Devroe (born 30 October 1969) is a Belgian dressage rider. Representing Belgium, he competed at three World Equestrian Games (in 2006, 2010 and 2014) and at five European Dressage Championships (in 2005, 2007, 2009, 2011 and 2015).

His current best championship result is 8th place in team dressage at the 2009 Europeans held at Windsor Castle, while his current best individual result is 22nd place from the 2006 World Equestrian Games.

Jeroen is also a four time participant at the Dressage World Cup Finals (in 2006, 2008, 2010 and 2011). His best World Cup result is 9th place on three occasions.
