= Susanna Bordone =

Italian equestrian

Personal information
- Born: 9 September 1981 (age 44) Milan, Italy
Medal record
Equestrian
Representing Italy
European Championships
Silver medal – second place	2009 Fontainebleau	Team eventing
Bronze medal – third place	2007 Pratoni del Vivaro	Team eventing

Susanna Bordone (born 9 September 1981) is an Italian Olympic eventing and dressage rider. She competed at three Summer Olympics (in 2004, 2008 and 2020). Her best Olympic results came in 2008 when she placed 5th in the team eventing. Her top individual Olympic result is 18th place from Tokyo 2020.

Bordone also participated at three World Equestrian Games (in 2002, 2006 and 2010), at five European Eventing Championships (in 2003, 2005, 2007, 2009 and 2011) and at two European Dressage Championships (in 2009 and 2011). She has won two team medals at the continental eventing championships.
