= Maria Eilberg =

British dressage rider

Personal information
- Nationality: British
- Born: January 9, 1984 (age 42)

Sport
- Sport: Dressage

Achievements and titles
- World finals: 2010 FEI World Equestrian Games
Medal record
Equestrian
Representing United Kingdom
World Championships
Silver medal – second place	2010 FEI World Equestrian Games	Team Dressage
European Championships
Silver medal – second place	2009 FEI European Championships	Team Dressage

Maria Eilberg is a British dressage rider. She won team silver with the British team at the European Championships in Windsor 2009 and at the World Equestrian Games in Lexington KY in 2010 with her horse Two Sox. She was also the first reserve for the British team at the 2008 Olympic Games and for the 2006 FEI World Equestrian Games.

Her brother Michael Eilberg is also a successful dressage rider for Great Britain. He won team silver at the European Championships in 2013 and at the 2014 FEI World Equestrian Games. Maria's father Ferdi is a renowned dressage trainer and silver medal winner at the 1993 European Championships.
