= Michał Rapcewicz =

Polish dressage rider (born 1982)

Personal information
- Born: Michał Rapcewicz; Mar 10, 1982 (age 44) Wałbrzych, Poland

Sport
- Country: Poland
- Sport: Equestrian

Achievements and titles
- Olympic finals: Beijing 2008, London 2012

Michał Rapcewicz (born 10 March 1982 in Wałbrzych) is a Polish dressage rider. He represented Poland at the 2008 Summer Olympics in the individual dressage, finishing in 22nd place, and then represented Poland at the 2012 Summer Olympics in the team (finishing in 8th place) and individual dressage (finishing in 45th place).
