= Juan Manuel Muñoz Díaz =

Spanish equestrian

Personal information
- Nationality: Spanish
- Born: 19 May 1969 (age 55); Écija, Spain
- Height: 1.72 m (5 ft 8 in)
- Weight: 73 kg (161 lb)

Sport
- Country: Spain
- Sport: Equestrian dressage
- Coached by: Luis Lucio

Juan Manuel Muñoz Díaz (born 19 May 1969) is a Spanish dressage rider. He represented Spain at the 2012 Summer Olympics in team and individual dressage. As of 2013, Díaz no longer competes in dressage.
