= Adelinde Cornelissen =

Dutch dressage rider (born 1979)

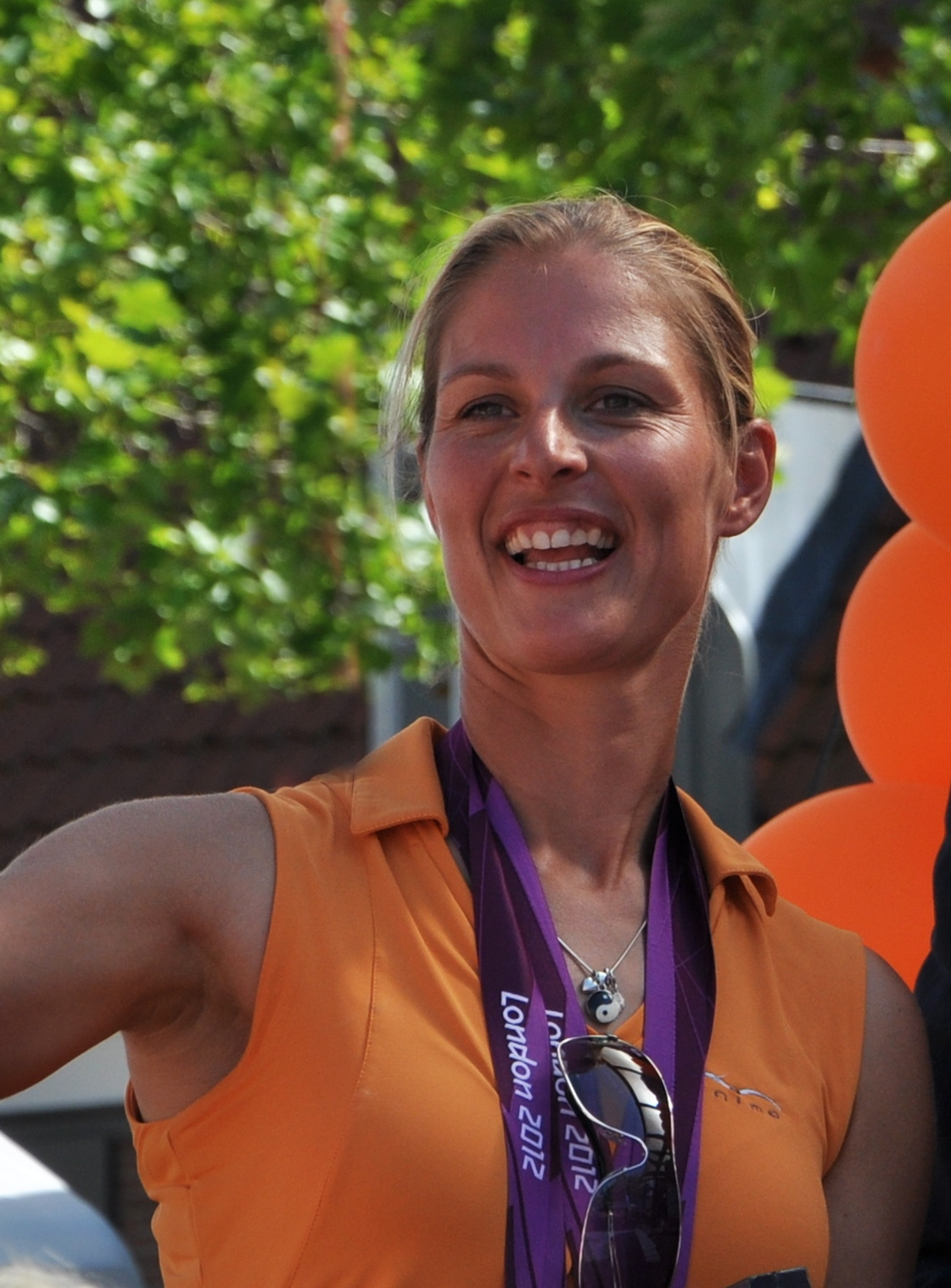

Personal information
- Nationality: Dutch
- Born: 8 July 1979 (age 46) Beilen, Netherlands

Sport
- Country: Netherlands
- Sport: Equestrian
- Turned pro: 2006

Achievements and titles
- Olympic finals: London 2012, Rio de Janeiro 2016
Medal record
Equestrian
Representing Netherlands
Olympic Games
Silver medal – second place	2012 London	Individual dressage
Bronze medal – third place	2012 London	Team dressage
World Championships
Gold medal – first place	2010 Kentucky	Team Dressage
Bronze medal – third place	2014 Normandy	Team dressage
Bronze medal – third place	2014 Normandy	Freestyle dressage
European Championships
Gold medal – first place	2009 Windsor	Spécial Dressage
Gold medal – first place	2009 Windsor	Team Dressage
Gold medal – first place	2011 Rotterdam	Spécial Dressage
Gold medal – first place	2011 Rotterdam	Freestyle Dressage
Silver medal – second place	2009 Windsor	Freestyle Dressage
Silver medal – second place	2013 Herning	Team Dressage
Bronze medal – third place	2011 Rotterdam	Team Dressage
Bronze medal – third place	2013 Herning	Spécial Dressage
Bronze medal – third place	2013 Herning	Freestyle Dressage
World Cup
Gold medal – first place	2011 Leipzig	Individual dressage
Gold medal – first place	2012 Den Bosch	Individual dressage
Silver medal – second place	2010 Den Bosch	Individual dressage
Silver medal – second place	2013 Gothenburg	Individual dressage

Adelinde Cornelissen (born 8 July 1979, in Beilen, Drenthe) is a Dutch dressage rider.

== Biography ==
As a junior, Cornelissen won three national Dutch titles; twice with Ayesha and once with Mr. Pride. In 2004, she won her first senior title at national level when she won the Z2-class with Parzival. In that same year she became national champion in the Reserve Championships in the ZZ-light-class with, followed by the same title in the ZZ-heavy-class title in 2005, both times on Parzival. In 2007, she and Parzival won the Dutch national championship in the heavy-class and she won two silver medals, at International Grand Prix meetings in Falsterbo and Herentals. In Falsterbo she finished second in the Grand Prix Spécial, while in she won the GPS in Herentals. During the Grand Prix in Rotterdam she and her teammates won the gold medal in the Nations competition, she came third in the Grand Prix Spécial. She won another GPS bronze medal in Arnhem.

In 2008, she became the champion in the Reserve Championships again, this time in the ZZ-heavy-class. She also became national champion at the Dutch Championships that year. Cornelissen and Parzival went on to win the International Grand Prix of Indoor Brabant, while they became second in the Grand Prix Spécial. At the Grand Prix meeting in Aachen, they became second in both the Grand Prix as well as the GPS.

Cornelissen was selected to represent the Netherlands at the 2008 Summer Olympics in Beijing as a reserve. The original team consisted of Anky van Grunsven, Imke Bartels and Hans Peter Minderhoud.

At the 2009 European Dressage Championship she won with Parzival team and individual (Grand Prix Spécial) gold and in the Grand Prix Freestyle she won the silver medal. At the 2010 FEI World Equestrian Games Cornelissen was eliminated in the Grand Prix due to blood being visible in Parzival's mouth as a result of Parzival having bitten his tongue.

In 2011 Adelinde Cornelissen won the Dressage World Cup Final in Leipzig with Parzival. At the 2011 European Dressage Championship in Rotterdam she won both individual gold medals Parzival, the Dutch team won the bronze medal. In 2012, she won the bronze medal in the team event at the Olympic Games and the silver medal in the individual dressage on Parzival. The day after Adelinde won the individual silver medal and upon being questioned by the BBC Breakfast presenter Bill Turnbull why Adelinde Cornelissen hadn't won the gold the president of the dressage ground jury, Stephen Clarke, stated that her horse had had a case of crossing jaws.

At the 2013 European Dressage Championships she won team silver and two bronze medals in individual events.

In the 2016 Summer Olympics in Rio de Janeiro, Cornelissen withdrew from the team dressage competition out of concern for her horse Parzival's health.

== International Championship Results ==
Results
Year	Event	Horse	Score	Placing	Notes
2009	European Championships	Jerich Parzival	80.638%	1st place, gold medalist(s)	Team
2009	European Championships	Jerich Parzival	84.042%	1st place, gold medalist(s)	Individual Special
2009	European Championships	Jerich Parzival	87.350%	2nd place, silver medalist(s)	Individual Freestyle
2010	World Cup Final	Jerich Parzival	82.850%	2nd place, silver medalist(s)	
2010	World Equestrian Games	Jerich Parzival	EL	1st place, gold medalist(s)	Team
2011	World Cup Final	Jerich Parzival	84.804%	1st place, gold medalist(s)	
2011	European Championships	Jerich Parzival	81.155%	3rd place, bronze medalist(s)	Team
2011	European Championships	Jerich Parzival	82.113%	1st place, gold medalist(s)	Individual Special
2011	European Championships	Jerich Parzival	88.839%	1st place, gold medalist(s)	Individual Freestyle
2012	World Cup Final	Jerich Parzival	85.250%	1st place, gold medalist(s)	
2012	Olympic Games	Jerich Parzival	81.687%	3rd place, bronze medalist(s)	Team
2012	Olympic Games	Jerich Parzival	88.196%	2nd place, silver medalist(s)	Individual
2013	World Cup Final	Jerich Parzival	86.500%	2nd place, silver medalist(s)	
2013	European Championships	Jerich Parzival	80.851%	2nd place, silver medalist(s)	Team
2013	European Championships	Jerich Parzival	81.548%	3rd place, bronze medalist(s)	Individual Special
2013	European Championships	Jerich Parzival	86.393%	3rd place, bronze medalist(s)	Individual Freestyle
2014	World Equestrian Games	Jerich Parzival	79.629%	3rd place, bronze medalist(s)	Team
2014	World Equestrian Games	Jerich Parzival	79.328%	4th	Individual Special
2014	World Equestrian Games	Jerich Parzival	85.714%	3rd place, bronze medalist(s)	Individual Freestyle
2016	Olympic Games	Jerich Parzival	RET	4th	Team
2017	World Young Horse Championships	Henkie	88.000%	6th	Five Year Olds
2017	World Young Horse Championships	Governor STR	90.600%	2nd place, silver medalist(s)	Six Year Olds
2017	World Young Horse Championships	Fleau de Baian	77.760%	7th	Seven Year Olds
2018	World Young Horse Championships	Henkie	81.600%	8th	Six Year Olds
2018	World Young Horse Championships	Governor STR	84.143%	2nd place, silver medalist(s)	Seven Year Olds
2021	European Championships	Governor STR	72.484%	5th	Team
2021	European Championships	Governor STR	72.143%	18th	Individual Special
2021	European Championships	Governor STR	EL		Individual Freestyle
EL = Eliminated; RET = Retired; WD = Withdrew

== Notable Horses ==
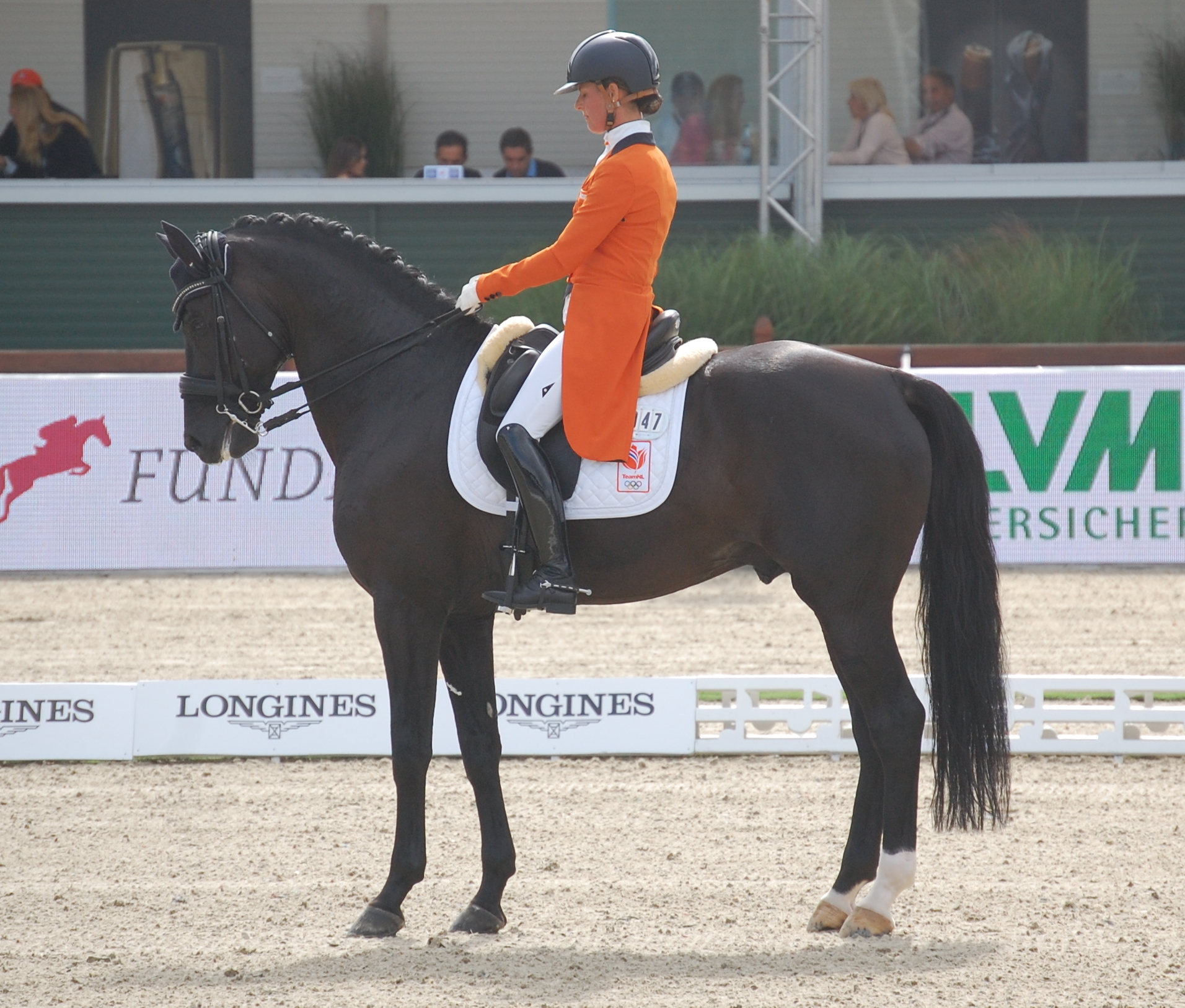
Adelinde Cornelissen and Governor, 2021 FEI Dressage European Championships in Hagen

- Jerich Parzival - 1997 Chestnut Dutch Warmblood Gelding (Jazz x Ulft)
  - 2009 European Championships - Team Gold Medal, Individual Gold Medal, Individual Silver Medal Freestyle
  - 2010 FEI World Cup Final - Silver Medal
  - 2010 World Equestrian Games - Team Gold Medal
  - 2011 FEI World Cup Final - Gold Medal
  - 2011 European Championships - Team Bronze Medal, Individual Gold Medal, Individual Gold Medal Freestyle
  - 2012 FEI World Cup Final - Gold Medal
  - 2012 London Olympics - Team Bronze Medal, Individual Silver Medal
  - 2013 FEI World Cup Final - Silver Medal
  - 2013 European Championships - Team Silver Medal, Individual Bronze Medal, Individual Bronze Medal Freestyle
  - 2014 World Equestrian Games - Team Bronze Medal, Individual Fourth Place, Individual Bronze Medal Freestyle
  - 2016 Rio Olympics - Team Fourth Place
- Henike - 2012 Bay Dutch Warmblood Stallion (Alexandro P x Upperville)
  - 2017 FEI Dressage Young Horse World Championships - Sixth Place
- Fleau de Baian - 2010 Chestnut Dutch Warmblood Stallion (Jazz)
  - 2017 FEI Dressage Young Horse World Championships - Seventh Place
- Governor STR - 2011 Black Dutch Warmblood Stallion (Totilas x Jazz)
  - 2017 FEI Dressage Young Horse World Championships - Silver Medal
