= Peter Gmoser =

Austrian equestrian

Personal information
- Nationality: Austrian
- Born: 16 February 1971 (age 55) Graz, Austria

Sport
- Sport: Equestrian

Peter Gmoser (born 16 February 1971) is an Austrian equestrian. He competed at the 2000 Summer Olympics and the 2004 Summer Olympics.
