= Minna Telde =

Swedish horse rider

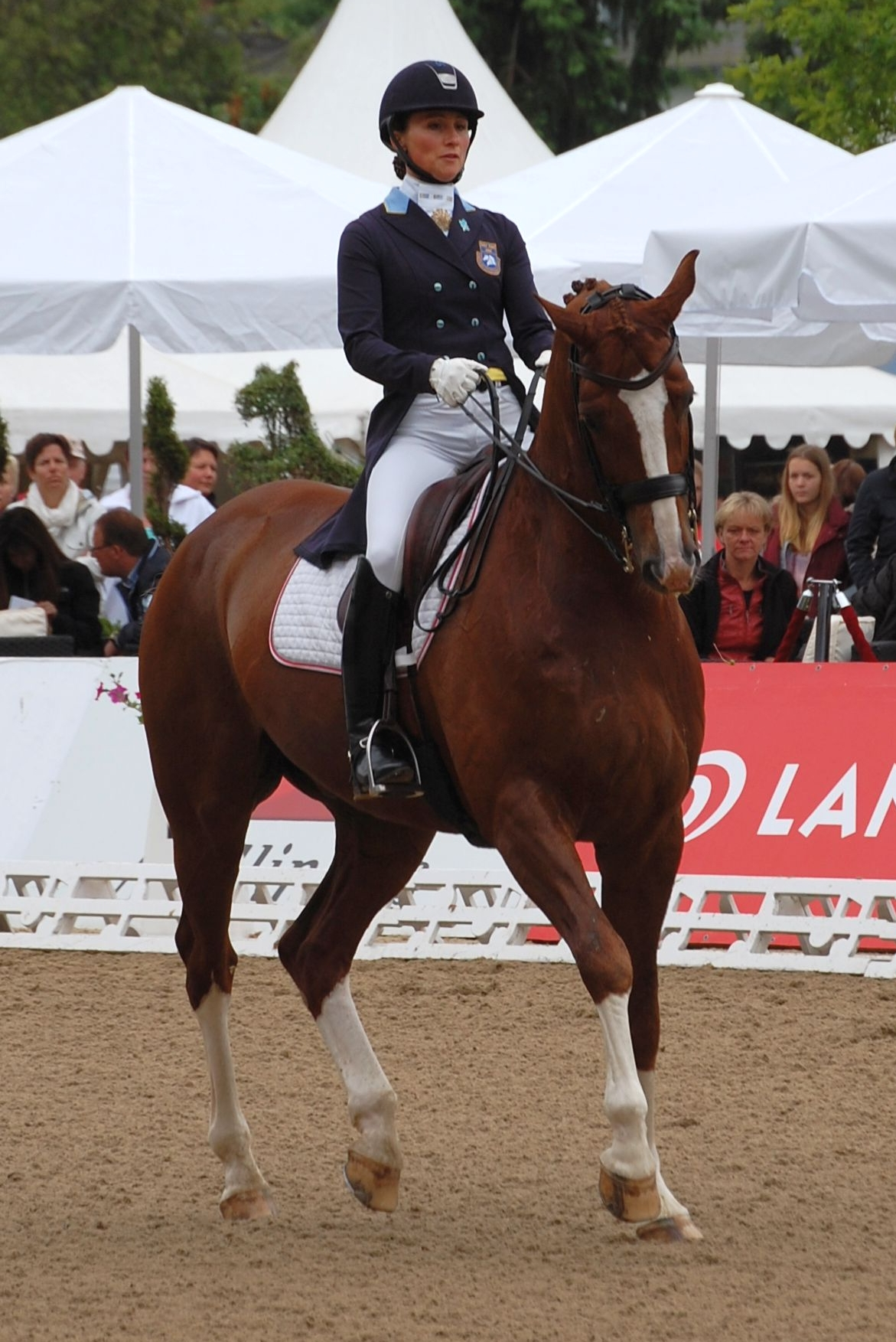
- Minna Telde and Deinhard (2014)

Personal information
- Born: Dec 19, 1974 (age 51) Uppsala, Sweden

Sport
- Country: Sweden
- Sport: Equestrian
- Coached by: Bo Jena

Achievements and titles
- Olympic finals: Athens 2004, London 2012

Minna Telde (born 1974) is a Swedish horse rider. She was born in Uppsala and competed at the 2004 Summer Olympics in Athens. She also represented Sweden in individual dressage and team dressage at the 2012 Summer Olympics in London.

Minna Telde lives in Sweden with son. Her soon to be husband Johan Ulander, has three children from previous marriage; Natalie, Christoffer and Joachim. Johan's oldest children Natalie 1996 and Christoffer 1998 attend private boarding schools in Switzerland.
