= Kyra Kyrklund =

Finnish equestrian (born 1951)

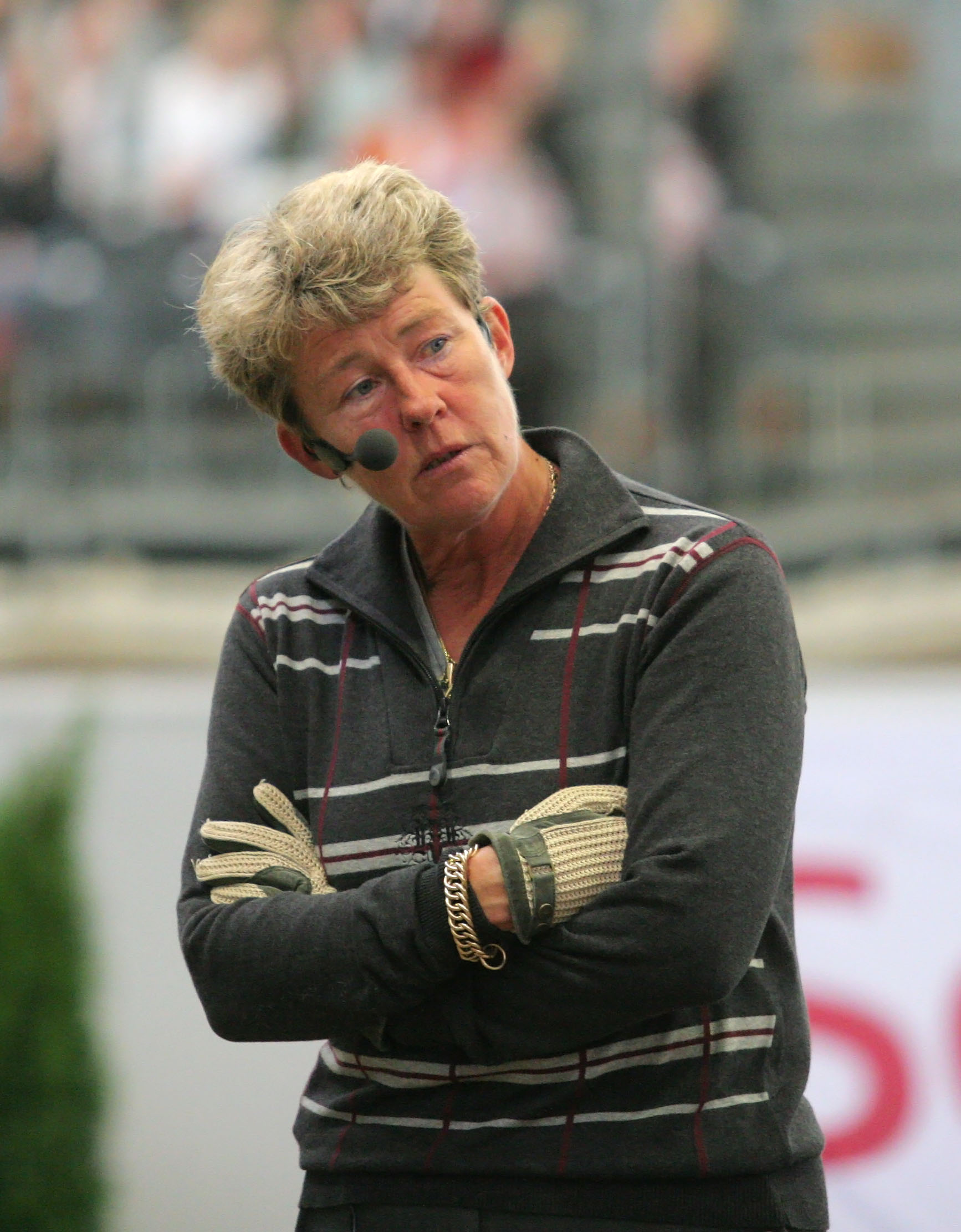

Medal record

Equestrian

Representing Finland

World Championships
Silver medal – second place	1990 Stockholm	Individual dressage

Kyra Marie Christine Kyrklund (born 30 November 1951 in Helsinki) is a Finnish dressage rider and trainer who currently lives in West Sussex. In 1991 she and "Matador II" won the World Cup Finals in Paris. She has competed in six Olympics.

== See also ==
- List of athletes with the most appearances at Olympic Games
