= Pierluigi Sangiorgi =

Italian equestrian

Personal information
- Nationality: Italian
- Born: 7 October 1968 (age 56); Faenza, Italy

Sport
- Sport: Equestrian

Pierluigi Sangiorgi (born 7 October 1968) is an Italian former equestrian. He competed in the individual dressage event at the 2008 Summer Olympics.
