= 2009 FEI European Championships =

2009 European Jumping and Dressage Championship
- Host city: Windsor, Great Britain (United Kingdom)
- Date(s): 25–30 August 2009
- Level: Senior
- Events: 3 Team, GP Special, GP Freestyle
- Records set: 1

The 2009 FEI European Jumping and Dressage Championships, also known as the 2009 Alltech FEI European Jumping and Dressage Championships, is the 30th edition of the European Show Jumping Championships and the 26th edition of the European Dressage Championship. It was held at Windsor Castle in Windsor, England, from August 25 to August 30, 2009. For the first time, the European Jumping Championships and the European Dressage Championship are being held at the same time. 92 competitors from 24 nations will compete in the jumping competition, while 54 competitors from 19 nations will compete in the dressage competition.

== Medal summary ==
=== Medal table ===
Rank	Nation	Gold	Silver	Bronze	Total
1	Netherlands (NED)	3	2	2	7
2	France (FRA)	1	0	0	1
2	Switzerland (SUI)	1	0	0	1
4	Germany (GER)	0	1	2	3
5	Great Britain (GBR)	0	1	1	2
6	Italy (ITA)	0	1	0	1
Totals (6 entries)		5	5	5	15

=== Medalists ===
Event	Gold	Silver	Bronze
Individual freestyle dressage	(Netherlands) Edward Gal on Moorlands Totilas	(Netherlands) Adelinde Cornelissen on Parzival	(Netherlands) Anky van Grunsven on Salinero
Individual special dressage	(Netherlands) Adelinde Cornelissen on Parzival	(Netherlands) Edward Gal on Moorlands Totilas	(United Kingdom) Laura Bechtolsheimer on Mistral Hojris
Team dressage	Netherlands; Edward Gal on Moorlands Totilas; Adelinde Cornelissen on Parzival; Anky van Grunsven on Salinero; Imke Schellekens-Bartels on Sunrise	Great Britain; Laura Bechtolsheimer on Mistral Hojris; Emma Hindle on Lancet; Carl Hester on Liebling II; Maria Eilberg on Two Sox	Germany; Matthias Alexander Rath on Sterntaler-Unicef; Monica Theodorescu on Whisper; Susanne Lebek on Potomac; Ellen Schulten-Baumer on Donatha S
Individual jumping	(France) Kevin Staut on Kraque Boom	(Germany) Carsten-Otto Nagel on Corradina	(Netherlands) Albert Zoer on Okidoki
Team jumping	Switzerland Pius Schwizer on Ulysse; Daniel Etter on Peu à Peu; Steve Guerdat on Jalisca Solier; Clarissa Grotta on West Side v. Meerputhoeve	Italy Juan-Carlos Garcia on Hamilton de Perhet; Giuseppe d'Onofrio on Landzeu; Natale Chiaudani on SNAI Seldana di campalto Piergiorgio Bucci on Kanebo	Germany Marcus Ehning on Plot Blue; Carsten-Otto Nagel on Corradina; Thomas Mühlbauer on Asti Spumante; Meredith Michaels-Beerbaum on Checkmate
