= Equestrian at the 2000 Summer Olympics – Individual dressage =

Individual dressage at the Games of the XXVII Olympiad
- Venue: Sydney International Equestrian Centre
- Date: 26–30 September 2000
- Competitors: 47 from 18 nations
- Winning time: 239.18

Medalists
1st place, gold medalist(s)		Anky van Grunsven	Netherlands
2nd place, silver medalist(s)		Isabell Werth	Germany
3rd place, bronze medalist(s)		Ulla Salzgeber	Germany

The individual dressage event, part of the equestrian program at the 2000 Summer Olympics, was held from 26 to 30 September 2000 at the Sydney International Equestrian Centre 45 miles outside of Sydney, Australia. Like all other equestrian events, the dressage competition was mixed gender, with both male and female athletes competing in the same division. Forty-eight horse and rider pairs were entered.

== Results ==
=== Grand Prix Test ===
Held Tuesday, 26 September. The first round was the Grand Prix Test. Each of the 48 pairs went through a series of movements in the sandy arena, with judges in five different positions observing the movements and giving percentage scores based on the execution of the movements. The total score for the round was the average of the five judges' scores. The top 25 pairs advanced to the second round, though no more than 3 pairs from any nation could advance.*

Rank	Rider	Horse	Nation	Judge E	Judge H	Judge C	Judge M	Judge B	Total points	% Score	Qual
1	Isabell Werth	Gigolo	Germany	386	375	383	383	381	1908	76.32	Q
2	Anky van Grunsven	Bonfire	Netherlands	367	382	377	371	378	1875	75.00	Q
3	Coby van Baalen	Ferro	Netherlands	371	384	383	369	366	1873	74.92	Q
4	Nadine Capellmann	Farbenfroh	Germany	361	362	377	393	374	1867	74.68	Q
5	Alexandra Simons de Ridder	Chacomo	Germany	368	373	377	369	370	1857	74.28	Q
6	Arjen Teeuwissen	Goliath	Netherlands	353	373	370	369	367	1831	73.24	Q
7	Ulla Salzgeber	Rusty	Germany	350	362	378	366	373	1829	73.16	Q
8	Lone Castrup Jørgensen	Kennedy	Denmark	349	368	366	353	360	1796	71.84	Q
9	Ellen Bontje	Silvano	Netherlands	356	370	351	357	352	1786	71.44	Q
10	Christine Traurig	Etienne	United States	345	344	353	353	351	1746	69.84	Q
11	Jon Pedersen	Esprit de Valdemar	Denmark	345	345	357	342	339	1728	69.12	Q
12	Susan Blinks	Flim Flam	United States	341	347	344	350	343	1725	69.00	Q
13	Beatriz Ferrer-Salat	Beauvalais	Spain	338	345	347	327	353	1710	68.40	Q
14	Kristy Oatley	Wall Street	Australia	335	338	337	346	348	1704	68.16	Q
15	Guenter Seidel	Foltaire	United States	343	351	338	328	335	1695	67.80	Q-T
16	Pia Lau	Renoir	Italy	326	346	350	333	337	1692	67.68	Q
17	Robert Dover	Ranier	United States	337	331	347	331	332	1678	67.12	Q
18	Emile Faurie	Rascher Hopes	Great Britain	331	338	332	324	349	1674	66.96	Q
19	Daniel Ramseier	Rali Baba	Switzerland	340	336	332	327	329	1664	66.56	Q
20	Rafael Soto	Invasor	Spain	331	337	328	342	325	1663	66.52	Q
21	Kallista Field	Waikare	New Zealand	323	330	342	336	330	1661	66.44	Q
22	Tinne Vilhelmson	Cezar	Sweden	327	337	324	323	335	1646	65.84	Q
23	Elena Sidneva	Podkhod	Russia	329	333	327	321	334	1644	65.76	Q
24	Peter Gmoser	Candidat	Austria	326	332	335	318	327	1638	65.52	Q
24	Juan Antonio Jimenez	Guizo	Spain	319	332	329	337	321	1638	65.52	Q
26	Christine Stueckelberger	Aquamarin	Switzerland	324	337	325	324	327	1637	65.48	Q
27	Daniel Pinto	Weldon Surpris	Portugal	317	329	329	330	327	1632	65.28	
28	Pether Markne	Amiral	Sweden	321	319	338	327	325	1630	65.20	
29	Anne van Olst	Any How	Denmark	320	332	324	324	325	1625	65.00	
30	Françoise Cantamessa	Sir S	Switzerland	311	327	332	317	336	1623	64.92	
31	Carl Hester	Argentine Gull	Great Britain	312	327	323	328	332	1622	64.88	
32	Patricia Bottani	Diamond	Switzerland	316	325	332	313	329	1615	64.60	
33	Rachael Downs	Aphrodite	Australia	318	321	323	311	340	1613	64.52	
34	Mary Hanna	Limbo	Australia	317	322	326	319	324	1608	64.32	
35	Ricky MacMillan	Crisp	Australia	319	324	324	317	318	1602	64.08	
35	Richard Davison	Askari	Great Britain	320	324	324	315	319	1602	64.08	
37	Elisabet Ehrnrooth	Harald	Finland	308	328	324	320	321	1601	64.04	
38	Stefan Peter	Bon Voyage	Austria	314	318	330	318	315	1595	63.80	
39	Svetlana Knyazeva	Russian Dance	Russia	313	308	328	315	314	1578	63.12	
40	Jan Brink	Briar	Sweden	299	313	310	343	319	1573	62.92	
41	Kirsty Mepham	Dikkiloo	Great Britain	292	316	322	325	315	1570	62.80	
42	Heike Holstein	Royale	Ireland	307	319	330	299	314	1569	62.76	
43	Lluis Lucio	Aljarafe	Spain	308	310	304	304	327	1553	62.12	
44	Antonio Rivera	Aczydos	Mexico	299	305	318	317	302	1541	61.64	
45	Morton Thomsen	Gay	Denmark	302	314	319	299	302	1536	61.44	
46	Heidi Svanborg	Bazalt	Finland	292	286	272	291	296	1437	57.48	
47	Jorge da Rocha	Quixote Lancia	Brazil	255	271	269	278	277	1350	54.00	
	Ulla Hakanson	Bobby	Sweden								WD

=== Grand Prix Special 2nd Qualifier ===
Held Friday, 29 September. The second round was the Grand Prix Special 2nd Qualifier. It was similar to the first, though the time allotted was shorter. The score from this round was averaged with the score from the Grand Prix Test. The top 17 pairs advanced to the final, though no more than 3 pairs from any nation could advance.

Rank	Rider	Horse	Nation	Round 1	Judge E	Judge H	Judge C	Judge M	Judge B	Total points	% Score	Total Score	Qual
1	Anky van Grunsven	Bonfire	Netherlands	75.00	346	331	327	340	336	1680	78.13	153.13	Q
2	Isabell Werth	Gigolo	Germany	76.32	323	338	317	331	318	1627	75.67	151.99	Q
3	Nadine Capellmann	Farbenfroh	Germany	74.68	326	322	332	327	340	1647	76.60	151.28	Q
4	Ulla Salzgeber	Rusty	Germany	73.16	346	325	327	329	323	1650	76.74	149.90	Q
4	Alexandra Simons de Ridder	Chacomo	Germany	74.28	333	315	324	325	325	1626	75.62	149.90	Q-T
6	Lone Joergensen	Kennedy	Denmark	71.84	322	321	321	324	318	1606	74.69	146.53	Q
7	Coby van Baalen	Ferro	Netherlands	74.92	316	310	312	307	289	1534	71.34	146.26	Q
8	Ellen Bontje	Silvano	Netherlands	71.44	317	313	309	312	310	1561	72.60	144.04	Q
9	Arjen Teeuwissen	Goliath	Netherlands	73.24	307	289	301	307	311	1515	70.46	143.70	Q-T
10	Christine Traurig	Etienne	United States	69.84	321	305	296	300	303	1525	70.93	140.77	Q
11	Susan Blinks	Flim Flam	United States	69.00	311	307	303	307	303	1531	71.20	140.20	Q
12	Beatriz Ferrer-Salat	Beauvalais	Spain	68.40	300	309	307	303	297	1516	71.20	138.91	Q
13	Kristy Oatley	Wall Street	Australia	68.16	307	297	311	306	289	1510	70.23	138.39	Q
14	Rafael Soto	Invasor	Spain	66.52	306	304	292	304	307	1513	70.37	136.89	Q
15	Daniel Ramseier	Rali Baba	Switzerland	66.56	292	299	316	306	293	1506	70.04	136.60	Q
16	Jon Pedersen	Esprit de Valdemar	Denmark	69.12	289	281	294	287	298	1449	67.39	136.51	Q
17	Pia Lau	Renoir	Italy	67.68	292	300	288	299	292	1471	68.41	136.09	Q
18	Kallista Field	Waikare	New Zealand	66.44	300	292	282	291	298	1463	68.04	134.48	
19	Juan Antonio Jimenez	Guizo	Spain	65.52	309	294	289	293	297	1482	68.93	134.45	
20	Emile Faurie	Rascher Hopes	Great Britain	66.96	281	280	286	287	276	1410	65.58	132.54	
21	Peter Gmoser	Candidat	Austria	65.52	286	282	287	286	289	1430	66.51	132.03	
22	Christine Stueckelberger	Aquamarin	Switzerland	65.48	279	287	285	289	286	1426	66.32	131.80	
23	Robert Dover	Ranier	United States	67.12	264	271	278	268	293	1374	63.90	131.02	
24	Elena Sidneva	Podkhod	Russia	65.76	273	275	284	279	258	1369	63.67	129.43	
25	Tinne Vilhelmson	Cezar	Sweden	65.84	254	249	247	245	256	1251	58.18	124.02	

=== Grand Prix Freestyle ===
Held Saturday, 30 September. The final round of dressage competition was the Grand Prix Freestyle Test. Fifteen pairs competed in this round, in which they designed their own program of movements set to music. They were judged on both execution of the movements (technical) and how well their performance matched the music (artistic). Each of the five judges gave a score from 0 to 10 in both categories, with the final score for the round being the sum of those ten scores. This score was then added to the scores from the other two rounds to determine final ranking.

Rank	Rider	Horse	Nation	Rounds 1+2	Judge E	Judge H	Judge C	Judge M	Judge B	Total points	% Score	Total Score
1st place, gold medalist(s)	Anky van Grunsven	Bonfire	Netherlands	153.13	7.85/9.00	7.90/9.15	8.05/9.00	8.20/9.02	8.25/9.62	40.25/45.79	86.05	239.18
2nd place, silver medalist(s)	Isabell Werth	Gigolo	Germany	151.99	7.45/8.60	7.25/8.65	8.05/8.77	7.75/8.92	7.85/8.90	38.35/43.84	82.20	234.19
3rd place, bronze medalist(s)	Ulla Salzgeber	Rusty	Germany	149.90	7.35/8.25	7.50/8.92	7.45/8.47	7.60/8.60	7.80/8.72	37.70/42.96	80.67	230.57
4	Nadine Capellmann	Farbenfroh	Germany	151.28	7.15/7.90	7.15/8.02	7.00/7.55	7.15/7.90	7.20/7.57	35.65/38.94	74.60	225.88
5	Coby van Baalen	Ferro	Netherlands	146.26	7.00/7.57	7.35/8.07	7.45/7.87	7.20/7.67	7.25/7.65	36.25/38.83	75.10	221.36
6	Ellen Bontje	Silvano	Netherlands	144.04	6.75/7.55	6.95/8.00	7.00/7.82	6.85/7.85	6.95/7.82	34.50/39.04	73.55	217.59
7	Lone Joergensen	Kennedy	Denmark	146.53	6.45/7.77	6.55/7.25	6.75/7.77	6.70/7.27	6.60/7.25	33.05/37.31	70.37	216.90
8	Susan Blinks	Flim Flam	United States	140.20	6.90/7.87	7.30/8.15	6.90/7.72	6.85/7.90	6.95/7.90	34.90/39.54	74.45	214.65
9	Kristy Oatley	Wall Street	Australia	138.39	6.50/7.00	7.20/7.75	7.05/7.62	6.80/7.50	7.10/7.87	34.65/37.74	72.40	210.79
10	Beatriz Ferrer-Salat	Beauvalais	Spain	138.91	6.60/7.22	6.80/7.50	6.90/7.65	7.05/7.67	6.70/7.32	34.05/37.36	71.42	210.33
11	Christine Traurig	Etienne	United States	140.77	6.30/7.40	6.30/7.32	6.30/7.35	5.90/6.82	6.45/7.42	31.25/36.31	67.57	208.34
12	Rafael Soto	Invasor	Spain	136.89	6.85/7.32	7.05/7.62	6.60/7.07	7.05/7.52	6.80/7.42	34.35/36.95	71.32	208.21
13	Daniel Ramseier	Rali Baba	Switzerland	136.60	6.55/7.07	6.55/7.47	6.60/7.15	6.65/7.27	6.60/7.07	32.95/36.03	69.00	205.60
14	Pia Lau	Renoir	Italy	136.09	6.40/7.15	6.50/7.05	6.70/7.55	6.75/7.17	6.75/7.32	32.10/36.24	69.35	205.44
15	Jon Pedersen	Esprit de Valdemar	Denmark	136.51	6.40/6.82	6.40/6.82	6.70/7.47	6.45/7.02	6.50/7.07	32.45/35.20	67.67	204.18

== Sources ==
- Official Report of the 2000 Sydney Summer Olympics available at https://web.archive.org/web/20060622162855/http://www.la84foundation.org/5va/reports_frmst.htm
