= Individual dressage at the 2002 FEI World Equestrian Games =

The individual dressage at the 2002 FEI World Equestrian Games in Jerez de la Frontera, Spain was held at Estadio Municipal de Chapín from September 10 to September 22, 2002. Germany's Nadine Capellmann won the gold medal. Beatriz Ferrer-Salat representing Spain won the silver medal and Ulla Salzgeber won bronze.

== Competition format ==
The team and individual dressage competitions used the same results. Dressage had three phases. The first phase was the Grand Prix. The top 30 individuals advanced to the second phase, the Grand Prix Special. The Individual Grand Prix Freestyle was the third phase where the individual medals where given. The best results of the Grand Prix Special and Grand Prix Freestyle counted for the final result.

Germany's Ann-Kathrin Linsenhoff, American Günter Seidel and Dutch Coby van Baalen qualified for the Freestyle, but with a maximum of the best three rider per country, Linsenhoff and Seidel were not allowed to compete in the final. Van Baalen had to withdraw from the Freestyle due an injury of her horse Olympic Ferro.

== Judges ==
The Grand Prix, Grand Prix Special and Grand Prix Freestyle were assessed by five judges. The president of the Ground Jury was Volker Moritz from Germany. The other judges were Mariette Withages from Belgium, Elizabeth McMullen from Canada, Jan Peeters from The Netherlands and Ernst Holz from South Africa.

== Schedule ==
Event date	Event details
11 September	Grand Prix Day 1
12 September	Grand Prix Day 2
13 September	Grand Prix Special
15 September	Grand Prix Freestyle

== Results ==
The individual results of dressage during the World Equestrian Games in 2002 were as follow:

Rider	Nation	Horse	GP score	Rank	GPS score	Rank	GPF score	Rank	Overall	Rank
Nadine Capellmann	Germany	Farbenfroh	77.96	1 Q	75.88	3 Q	83.67	2	237.51	1st place, gold medalist(s)
Beatriz Ferrer-Salat	Spain	Beauvalais	74.56	4 Q	77.00	1 Q	82.82	3	234.38	2nd place, silver medalist(s)
Ulla Salzgeber	Germany	Rusty	75.64	2 Q	74.12	5 Q	83.78	1	233.54	3rd place, bronze medalist(s)
Debbie McDonald	United States of America	Brentina	74.64	3 Q	76.12	2 Q	82.70	4	233.46	4
Lisa Wilcox	United States of America	Relevant 5	74.20	5 Q	75.68	4 Q	82.64	5	232.52	5
Rafael Soto	Spain	Invasor	72.16	8 Q	73.04	11 Q	78.90	6	224.10	6
Klaus Husenbeth	Germany	Piccolino	72.08	9 Q	73.52	6 Q	76.33	9	221.93	7
Lone Joergensen	Denmark	FBW Kennedy	71.92	10 Q	73.20	10 Q	76.50	7	221.62	8
Lars Petersen	Denmark	Blue Hors Cavan	71.44	11 Q	73.52	7 Q	75.73	10	220.69	9
Susan Blinks	United States of America	Flim Flam	72.24	7 Q	73.24	9 Q	74.37	11	219.85	10
Anky van Grunsven	Netherlands	Krack C	69.52	14 Q	71.80	12 Q	76.37	8	217.69	11
Elena Sidneva	Russia	Artax Condor RBB	69.52	14 Q	69.76	15 Q	74.30	12	213.58	12
Jan Brink	Sweden	Briar 899	68.52	19 Q	70.56	13 Q	71.86	14	210.94	13
Gonnelien Rothenberger	Netherlands	Jonggor's Weyden	68.20	22 Q	69.88	14 Q	72.67	13	210.75	14
Jon D. Petersen	Denmark	Esprit de Valdemar	69.40	16 Q	67.64	22 Q	70.03	15	207.07	15
Ann-Kathrin Linsenhoff	Germany	Renoir-UNICEF	70.32	12 Q	73.40	8				
Coby van Baalen	Netherlands	Olympic Ferro	72.52	6 Q	69.64	16				
Günter Seidel	United States of America	Nikolaus	69.84	13 Q	69.60	17				
Daniel Ramseier	Switzerland	Rali Baba	68.24	21 Q	68.68	18				
Christian Pläge	Switzerland	Regent	69.12	18 Q	67.80	20				
Ignacio Rambla	Spain	Granadero	68.44	20 Q	68.24	19				
Juan Antonio Jiminez Cobo	Spain	Guizo	69.40	16 Q	66.68	23				
Françoise Cantamessa	Switzerland	Laudatio	66.92	25 Q	67.80	21				
Tinne Vilhelmson-Silfvén	Sweden	Solos Carex	67.00	24 Q	65.64	24				
Shannon Dueck	Canada	Korona	67.56	23 Q	59.60	25				
Nathalie Zu-Sayn Wittgenstein	Denmark	Fantast S	66.80	26						
Alexandra Korelova	Russia	Balagur	66.12	27						
Richard Davison	Great Britain	Ballaseyr Royale	66.08	28						
Tineke Bartels	Netherlands	Broere Jazz	65.88	29						
Mattias Jansson	Sweden	Morell	65.84	30						
Laura Richardson	Great Britain	Millenium	65.80	31						
Iryna Lis	Belarus	Problesk	65.64	32						
Nancy McLachlan	Canada	Davis Cup	65.48	33						
Anna Merveldt	Ireland	Fosbury	65.48	33						
Andrea John	Austria	Hermes 89	65.36	35						
Oded Shimoni	Israel	Glenstern	65.20	36						
Heath Ryan	Australia	G.V. Sterling Stilton	64.96	37						
Ashley Holzer	Canada	Imperioso (NL)	64.72	38						
Nina Stadlinger	Austria	Egalite	64.64	39						
Olga Klimko	Ukraine	Bosporus-S	64.44	40						
Mary Hanna	Australia	Limbo	64.40	41						
Yvette Truesdale	Ireland	Accolade	64.32	42						
Peter Gmoser	Austria	Willibald's Candidat	64.08	43						
Belinda Trussell	Canada	Royal II	63.96	44						
Ricky MacMillan	Australia	Crisp	63.84	45						
Elena Kalinina	Russia	Manhattan	63.68	46						
Stefano Blasi	Italy	Red Bastian	63.60	47						
Hubert Perring	France	Diabolo St. Maurice	63.36	48						
Rachael Sanna	Australia	Yardly Aphrodite	63.24	49						
Emile Faurie	Great Britain	Insterburg	63.16	50						
Peter Storr	Great Britain	Gambrinus	63.04	51						
Heike Holstein	Ireland	Welt Adel	62.84	52						
Stefan Peter	Austria	Acartenango	62.80	53						
Cesar Parra	Colombia	Robinson 94	62.64	54						
Susanne Gielen	Sweden	Chasmir	62.60	55						
Kallista Field	New Zealand	Jamahl	61.88	56						
Yoshikata Serimachi	Japan	Rousseau 28	61.88	56						
Yuri Kovshov	Ukraine	Welcome	61.84	58						
Silvia Iklé	Switzerland	Romario	60.92	59						
James Connor	Ireland	High Flyer	60.80	60						
Inessa Porturaeva	Russia	Targim	60.60	61						
Kuranojo Saito	Japan	He Man	60.60	61						
Daniel Pinto	Portugal	Weldon Surprise	60.32	63						
Elisabet Ehrnrooth	Finland	Angard	59.72	64						
Micheline Schulze	Brazil	Frape	54.20	65						
