= Equestrian at the 2000 Summer Olympics – Team dressage =

Team dressage at the Games of the XXVII Olympiad
- Venue: Sydney International Equestrian Centre
- Date: 26 September 2000
- Competitors: 35 from 9 nations
- Teams: 9
- Winning time: 5,632

Medalists
1st place, gold medalist(s)		Isabell Werth, Alexandra Simons de Ridder, Ulla Salzgeber,	Germany
2nd place, silver medalist(s)		Anky van Grunsven, Ellen Bontje, Arjen Teeuwissen, Coby van Baalen	Netherlands
3rd place, bronze medalist(s)		Robert Dover, Susan Blinks, Guenter Seidel, Christine Traurig	United States

The team dressage event, part of the equestrian program at the 2000 Summer Olympics was held on 26 September 2000 at the Sydney International Equestrian Centre 45 miles outside of Sydney, Australia. The results of the first round of the individual dressage were used to award rankings. Like all other equestrian events, the dressage competition was mixed gender, with both male and female athletes competing in the same division. Nine teams, each consisting of four horse and rider pairs, entered the contest.

== Results ==
Rank	NOC	Rider	Horse	Judge E	Judge H	Judge C	Judge M	Judge B	Scored	Points	Team Points
1	Germany	Isabell Werth	Gigolo	386	375	383	383	381	#	1908	5632
1	Germany	Alexandra Simons de Ridder	Chacomo	368	373	377	369	370	#	1857	5632
1	Germany	Ulla Salzgeber	Rusty	350	362	378	366	373		1829	5632
1	Germany	Nadine Capellmann	Farbenfroh	361	362	377	393	374	#	1867	5632
2	Netherlands	Anky van Grunsven	Bonfire	367	382	377	371	378	#	1875	5579
2	Netherlands	Ellen Bontje	Silvano	356	370	351	357	352		1786	5579
2	Netherlands	Arjen Teeuwissen	Goliath	353	373	370	369	367	#	1831	5579
2	Netherlands	Coby van Baalen	Ferro	371	384	383	369	366	#	1873	5579
3	United States	Robert Dover	Ranier	337	331	347	331	332		1678	5166
3	United States	Susan Blinks	Flim Flam	341	347	344	350	343	#	1725	5166
3	United States	Guenter Seidel	Foltaire	343	351	338	328	335	#	1695	5166
3	United States	Christine Traurig	Etienne	345	344	353	353	351	#	1746	5166
4	Denmark	Jon Pedersen	Esprit de Valdemar	345	345	357	342	339	#	1728	5149
4	Denmark	Morton Thomsen	Gay	302	314	319	299	302		1536	5149
4	Denmark	Anne van Olst	Any How	320	332	324	324	325	#	1625	5149
4	Denmark	Lone Jorgensen	Kennedy	349	368	366	353	360	#	1796	5149
5	Spain	Juan Antonio Jimenez	Guizo	319	332	329	337	321	#	1638	5011
5	Spain	Rafael Soto	Invasor	331	337	328	342	325	#	1663	5011
5	Spain	Luis Lucio	Aljarafe	308	310	304	304	327		1553	5011
5	Spain	Beatriz Ferrer-Salat	Beauvalais	338	345	347	327	353	#	1710	5011
6	Australia	Kristy Oatley-Nist	Wall Street	335	338	337	346	348	#	1704	4925
6	Australia	Rachael Downs	Aphrodite	318	321	323	311	340	#	1613	4925
6	Australia	Ricky MacMillan	Crisp	319	324	324	317	318		1602	4925
6	Australia	Mary Hanna	Limbo	317	322	326	319	324	#	1608	4925
7	Switzerland	Patricia Bottani	Diamond	316	325	332	313	329		1615	4924
7	Switzerland	Daniel Ramseier	Rali Baba	340	336	332	327	329	#	1664	4924
7	Switzerland	Christine Stueckelberger	Aquamarin	324	337	325	324	327	#	1637	4924
7	Switzerland	Francoise Cantamessa	Sir S	311	327	332	317	336	#	1623	4924
8	Great Britain	Emile Faurie	Rascher Hopes	331	338	332	324	349	#	1674	4898
8	Great Britain	Carl Hester	Argentine Gull	312	327	323	328	332	#	1622	4898
8	Great Britain	Kirsty Mepham	Dikkiloo	292	316	322	325	315		1570	4898
8	Great Britain	Richard Davison	Askari	320	324	324	315	319	#	1602	4898
9	Sweden	Ulla Hakanson	Bobby							WD	4849
9	Sweden	Jan Brink	Briar	299	313	310	343	319	#	1573	4849
9	Sweden	Tinne Vilhelmson-Silfvén	Cezar	327	337	324	323	335	#	1646	4849
9	Sweden	Pether Markne	Amiral	321	319	338	327	325	#	1630	4849
