= Equestrian at the 2004 Summer Olympics – Individual dressage =

Individual dressage at the Games of the XXVIII Olympiad
- Venue: Markopoulo Olympic Equestrian Centre
- Date: 20–25 August 2004
- Competitors: 51 from 18 nations
- Winning time: 79.278

Medalists
1st place, gold medalist(s)		Anky van Grunsven	Netherlands
2nd place, silver medalist(s)		Ulla Salzgeber	Germany
3rd place, bronze medalist(s)		Beatriz Ferrer-Salat	Spain

The individual dressage event, part of the equestrian program at the 2004 Summer Olympics, was held from 20 to 25 August 2004 at the Olympic Equestrian Centre on the outskirts of Markópoulo, in the Attica region of Greece. Like all other equestrian events, the dressage competition was mixed gender, with both male and female athletes competing in the same division. 53 horse and rider pairs were entered.

== Results ==
=== Inspection ===
The inspection was held on 19 August. 49 of the horses were passed on initial inspection. Three were re-inspected before being accepted, and one was disqualified.

Re-inspections:

- Wels, ridden by Friedrich Gaulhofer of Austria
- Gabana, ridden by Louisa Hill of New Zealand
- Condor, ridden by Elena Sidneva of Russia

Disqualification:

- Heros, ridden by Alaia Demiropoulou of Greece.

=== Grand Prix Test ===
The first round was the Grand Prix Test. Each of the 52 pairs went through a series of movements in the sandy arena, with judges in five different positions observing the movements and giving percentage scores based on the execution of the movements. The total score for the round was the average of the five judges' scores. The top 25 pairs advanced to the second round, though no more than 3 pairs from any nation could advance.

Rank	Rider (Horse)	Judge 1	Judge 2	Judge 3	Judge 4	Judge 5	Score
1	Ulla Salzgeber (Rusty) (GER)	77.708	77.917	81.667	76.042	77.708	78.208
2	Beatriz Ferrer-Salat (Beauvalais) (ESP)	74.792	75.208	74.583	75.417	73.333	74.667
3	Anky van Grunsven (Salinero) (NED)	72.292	75.625	75.208	73.125	74.792	74.208
4	Martin Schaudt (Weltall) (GER)	70.000	73.333	75.833	75.000	72.917	73.417
5	Deborah McDonald (Brentina) (USA)	74.167	71.875	75.000	72.292	73.542	73.375
6	Jan Brink (Briar) (SWE)	72.083	72.500	74.167	74.375	73.125	73.250
7	Rafael Soto (Invasor) (ESP)	72.292	72.500	73.958	72.917	72.292	72.792
8	Hubertus Schmidt (Wansuela Suerte) (GER)	74.167	73.333	72.292	70.000	71.875	72.333
9	Robert Dover (Kennedy) (USA)	72.083	72.083	72.083	71.250	70.625	71.625
10	Heike Kemmer (Bonaparte) (GER)	71.250	70.625	71.875	72.917	69.792	71.292
10	Juan Antonio Jimenez (Guizo) (ESP)	71.458	70.208	69.583	72.708	72.500	71.292
12	Carl Hester (Escapado) (GBR)	70.208	70.625	71.042	71.458	70.000	70.667
12	Per Sandgaard (Zancor) (DEN)	68.750	70.833	71.250	71.458	71.042	70.667
14	Sven Rothenberger (Barclay II) (NED)	69.375	70.208	70.417	68.958	70.208	69.833
15	Imke Bartels (Lancet) (NED)	70.625	69.375	68.333	68.542	71.875	69.750
16	Guenter Seidel (Aragon) (USA)	70.625	68.542	70.625	67.292	70.417	69.500
17	Jon Pedersen (Esprit de Valdemar) (DEN)	69.375	67.292	70.625	68.125	69.583	69.000
18	Lisa Wilcox (Relevant 5) (USA)	68.542	68.125	70.000	69.583	67.708	68.792
19	Julia Chevanne Gimel (Calimucho) (FRA)	68.333	69.375	69.167	68.750	68.125	68.750
20	Victoria Max-Theurer (Falcao) (AUT)	67.500	70.417	70.208	67.083	68.125	68.667
21	Richard Davison (Ballaseyr Royale) (GBR)	68.333	69.583	68.333	67.708	68.750	68.542
22	Andreas Helgstrand (Cavan) (DEN)	68.750	68.958	69.167	67.917	66.875	68.333
23	Alexandra Korelova (Balagur) (RUS)	66.250	70.208	68.958	68.958	66.875	68.250
24	Karen Tebar (Falada M) (FRA)	67.708	67.917	68.750	69.375	66.042	67.958
25	Emma Hindle (Wie Weltmeyer) (GBR)	67.500	67.500	67.292	66.875	68.333	67.500
26	Nina Stadlinger (Egalite) (AUT)	65.625	67.500	69.792	67.500	66.458	67.375
27	Iryna Lis (Problesk) (BLR)	68.542	67.083	66.875	66.875	66.042	67.083
28	Silvia Ikle (Salieri CH) (SUI)	66.042	66.458	67.083	68.333	67.292	67.042
29	Tinne Vilhelmson-Silfvén (Just Mickey) (SWE)	68.333	65.625	67.500	65.625	67.500	66.917
30	Christian Plaege (Regent) (SUI)	65.417	68.750	67.917	67.708	63.542	66.667
31	Louise Nathorst (Guinness) (SWE)	67.500	68.125	65.417	65.208	66.667	66.583
31	Elena Sidneva (Condor) (RUS)	66.042	63.958	69.167	66.458	67.292	66.583
31	Cynthia Ishoy (Proton) (CAN)	65.417	66.667	67.917	68.333	64.583	66.583
34	Nicola McGivern (Active Walero) (GBR)	65.625	66.667	68.125	66.042	65.833	66.458
35	Leslie Reid (Mark) (CAN)	65.833	64.792	66.458	66.250	67.083	66.083
36	Belinda Trussell (Royan II) (CAN)	66.458	66.458	67.708	65.000	64.375	66.000
37	Ricky MacMillan (Crisp) (AUS)	65.000	65.000	66.042	67.917	65.625	65.917
38	Lone Joergensen (Ludewig G) (DEN)	63.333	66.875	68.125	65.208	65.208	65.750
39	Mary Hanna (Limbo) (AUS)	65.417	65.000	67.500	65.208	64.375	65.500
40	Minna Telde (Sack) (SWE)	65.833	64.375	66.042	66.250	64.375	65.375
41	Ignacio Rambla (Oleaje) (ESP)	65.417	64.792	65.417	65.000	63.125	64.750
42	Ashley Holzer (Imperioso) (CAN)	64.583	65.625	65.833	64.583	62.708	64.667
43	Marlies van Baalen (Idocus) (NED)	62.708	65.625	65.208	65.833	63.542	64.583
44	Friedrich Gaulhofer (Wels) (AUT)	62.917	63.333	63.542	65.417	63.125	63.667
45	Daniel Ramseier (Palladio) (SUI)	62.083	65.625	63.333	63.750	61.458	63.250
46	César Parra (Galant du Serein) (COL)	61.250	61.458	63.542	65.208	63.125	62.917
47	Alexandra Sourla (Gregory) (GRE)	62.500	65.208	62.083	63.125	61.250	62.833
48	Peter Gmoser (Don Debussy) (AUT)	62.292	62.292	62.917	64.167	62.083	62.750
49	Louisa Hill (Gabana) (NZL)	60.417	62.917	63.750	62.500	63.958	62.708
50	Heike Holstein (Welt Adel) (IRL)	60.208	64.375	58.542	61.042	57.917	60.417
51	Gerta Lehmann (Louis) (GRE)	59.583	62.083	58.542	60.208	59.583	60.000
—	Jasmien Sanche-Burger (Mr G de Lully) (SUI)	(Withdrawn)					

=== Grand Prix Special ===
The Grand Prix Special Test was the second round. It was similar to the first, though the time allotted was shorter. The score from this round was averaged with the score from the Grand Prix Test, with the top fifteen pairs advancing to the final round. Individual judges' scores were given in 1/5 point increments.

Rank	Nation	Rider	Horse	Judge 1	Judge 2	Judge 3	Judge 4	Judge 5	Score	Place	Overall
1	Germany	Ulla Salzgeber	Rusty	76.0	76.0	73.8	75.2	73.2	74.84	3	76.524
2	Netherlands	Anky van Grunsven	Salinero	76.8	82.6	76.4	77.8	75.4	77.80	1	76.004
3	Spain	Beatriz Ferrer-Salat	Beauvalais	75.4	76.4	75.8	76.4	74.8	75.76	2	75.213
4	United States	Deborah McDonald	Brentina	75.8	76.2	73.4	75.0	73.4	74.76	4	74.067
5	Germany	Hubertus Schmidt	Wansuela Suerte	73.4	75.0	72.0	73.4	73.4	73.44	7	72.887
6	United States	Robert Dover	Kennedy	74.6	74.2	74.8	73.6	73.0	74.04	5	72.833
7	Sweden	Jan Brink	Briar	73.0	71.2	71.4	70.8	70.0	71.28	11	72.265
8	Germany	Martin Schaudt	Weltall	68.8	72.4	70.4	69.6	71.8	70.60	14	72.008
9	Great Britain	Carl Hester	Escapado	73.4	73.0	71.0	73.0	71.8	72.44	8	71.553
10	Denmark	Andreas Helgstrand	Cavan	74.2	75.8	73.4	73.8	72.6	73.96	6	71.147
11	Denmark	Per Sandgaard	Zancor	73.2	69.4	71.4	72.2	71.6	71.56	10	71.113
12	Spain	Rafael Soto	Invasor	69.6	69.0	68.6	68.4	69.4	69.00	18	70.896
13	Netherlands	Imke Bartels	Lancet	73.4	71.6	70.6	72.4	70.6	71.72	9	70.735
14	United States	Guenter Seidel	Aragon	71.6	71.4	70.8	70.2	71.2	71.04	13	70.270
15	Spain	Juan Antonio Jimenez	Guizo	69.6	68.4	68.0	67.0	68.2	68.240	20	69.766
16	France	Julia Chevanne Gimel	Calimucho	71.0	72.2	69.6	69.4	70.6	70.56	15	69.655
17	Netherlands	Sven Rothenberger	Barclay II	72.2	67.4	67.2	70.0	68.4	69.04	17	69.437
18	Switzerland	Silvia Ikle	Salieri CH	72.4	70.6	69.8	71.0	72.0	71.16	12	69.101
19	Denmark	Jon Pedersen	Esprit de Valdemar	71.4	69.2	67.6	68.6	69.0	69.16	16	69.080
20	Austria	Victoria Max-Theurer	Falcao	70.6	66.0	68.8	68.6	70.2	68.84	19	68.753
21	France	Karen Tebar	Falada M	67.2	65.6	66.8	67.4	70.2	67.44	21	67.699
22	Great Britain	Richard Davison	Ballaseyr Royale	67.6	66.8	65.2	65.6	65.6	66.16	22	67.351
23	Russia	Alexandra Korelova	Balagur	65.8	66.4	65.4	65.0	67.0	65.92	24	67.085
24	Belarus	Iryna Lis	Problesk	66.2	65.6	66.2	65.6	66.2	65.96	23	66.522
25	Austria	Nina Stadlinger	Egalite	65.4	66.2	64.0	63.4	65.6	64.92	25	66.148

=== Grand Prix Freestyle ===
The final round of dressage competition was the Grand Prix Freestyle Test. Fifteen pairs competed in this round, in which they designed their own program of movements set to music. They were judged on both execution of the movements (technical) and how well their performance matched the music (artistic). Each of the five judges gave a score from 0 to 10 in both categories, with the final score for the round being the sum of those ten scores. This score was then averaged with the scores from the other two rounds to determine final ranking.

Rank	Nation	Rider	Horse	Technical total	Artistic total	Score	Place	Overall
1	Netherlands	Anky van Grunsven	Salinero	40.600	45.225	85.825	1	79.278
2	Germany	Ulla Salzgeber	Rusty	38.900	44.550	83.450	2	78.833
3	Spain	Beatriz Ferrer-Salat	Beauvalais	37.450	42.125	79.575	3	76.667
4	United States	Deborah McDonald	Brentina	37.250	41.575	78.825	6	75.653
5	Germany	Hubertus Schmidt	Wansuela Suerte	37.800	41.075	78.875	5	74.883
6	United States	Robert Dover	Kennedy	37.650	40.825	78.475	7	74.713
7	Sweden	Jan Brink	Briar	36.350	40.300	76.650	8	73.727
8	Spain	Rafael Soto	Invasor	38.050	40.975	79.025	4	73.606
9	Denmark	Andreas Helgstrand	Cavan	36.150	40.150	76.300	9	72.864
10	Denmark	Per Sandgaard	Zancor	35.700	39.350	75.050	11	72.426
11	Netherlands	Imke Bartels	Lancet	35.800	39.050	74.850	12	72.107
12	Spain	Juan Antonio Jimenez	Guizo	36.350	39.050	75.400	10	71.644
13	Great Britain	Carl Hester	Escapado	33.650	37.925	71.575	14	71.561
14	United States	Guenter Seidel	Aragon	35.300	38.500	73.800	13	71.447
15	Germany	Martin Schaudt	Weltall	31.350	33.600	64.950	15	69.656

== Qualifying athletes ==
Place	Athlete	Country
1	Anky van Grunsven	Netherlands
2	Ulla Salzgeber	Germany
3	Beatriz Ferrer-Salat	Spain
4	Deborah McDonald	United States
5	Hubertus Schmidt	Germany
6	Robert Dover	United States
7	Jan Brink	Sweden
8	Rafael Soto	Spain
9	Andreas Helgstrand	Denmark
10	Per Sangaard	Denmark
11	Imke Bartels	Netherlands
12	Juan Antonio Jiminez	Spain
13	Carl Hester	Great Britain
14	Guenter Seidel	United States
15	Martin Schaudt	Germany
16	Julia Chevanne-Gimel	France
17	Sven Rothenberger	Netherlands
18	Silvia Ikle	Switzerland
19	Jon Pedersen	Denmark
20	Victoria Max-Theurer	Austria
21	Karen Tebar	France
22	Richard Davison	Great Britain
23	Alexandra Korelova	Russia
24	Iryna Lis	Belarus
25	Nina Stadlinger	Austria
26	Heike Kemmer	Germany
27	Lisa Wilcox	United States
28	Emma Hindle	Great Britain
29	Tinne Vilhelmson	Sweden
30	Christian Plaege	Switzerland
31	Louise Nathorst	Sweden
32	Elena Sidneva	Russia
33	Cynthia Ishoy	Canada
34	Nicola McGivern	Great Britain
35	Leslie Reid	Canada
36	Belinda Trussell	Canada
37	Rick MacMillan	Australia
38	Lone Joergensen	Denmark
39	Mary Hanna	Australia
40	Minna Telde	Sweden
41	Ignacio Rambla	Spain
42	Ashley Holzer	Canada
43	Marlies van Baalen	Netherlands
44	Fritz Gaulhofer	Austria
45	Daniel Ramseier	Switzerland
46	Cesar Parra	Colombia
47	Alexandra Sourla	Greece
48	Peter Gmoser	Austria
49	Louisa Hill	New Zealand
50	Heike Holstein	Ireland
51	Gerta Lehmann	Greece
w/d	Jasmien Sanche-Burger	Switzerland
DSQ	Alaia Demiropoulou	Greece
