= Equestrian at the 2004 Summer Olympics – Team dressage =

Team dressage at the Games of the XXVIII Olympiad
- Venue: Markopoulo Olympic Equestrian Centre
- Date: 20–21 August 2004
- Competitors: 39 from 10 nations
- Teams: 10

Medalists
1st place, gold medalist(s)		Ulla Salzgeber, Martin Schaudt, Hubertus Schmidt, Heike Kemmer	Germany
2nd place, silver medalist(s)		Beatriz Ferrer-Salat, Rafael Soto, Juan Antonio Jimenez, Ignacio Rambla	Spain
3rd place, bronze medalist(s)		Debbie McDonald, Robert Dover, Günter Seidel, Lisa Wilcox	United States

The team dressage event, part of the equestrian program at the 2004 Summer Olympics, used the results of the first round of the individual dressage to award rankings. That round was held on 20 August and 21 August 2004 at the Olympic Equestrian Centre on the outskirts of Markópoulo, in the Attica region of Greece. Like all other equestrian events, the dressage competition was mixed gender, with both male and female athletes competing in the same division. 10 teams, each consisting of four horse and rider pairs, entered the contest.

== Results ==
=== By individual ===
The team event used the points from the first round of competition. 40 of the 52 pairs that competed in the individual event were members of a team. Team members are shown below, with scores used for the team highlighted.

Rank	Nation	Rider	Horse	Judge 1	Judge 2	Judge 3	Judge 4	Judge 5	Score
1	Germany	Ulla Salzgeber	Rusty	77.708	77.917	81.667	76.042	77.708	78.208
2	Spain	Beatriz Ferrer-Salat	Beauvalais	74.792	75.208	74.583	75.417	73.333	74.667
3	Netherlands	Anky van Grunsven	Salinero	72.292	75.625	75.208	73.125	74.792	74.208
4	Germany	Martin Schaudt	Weltall	70.000	73.333	75.833	75.000	72.917	73.417
5	United States	Deborah McDonald	Brentina	74.167	71.875	75.000	72.292	73.542	73.375
6	Sweden	Jan Brink	Briar	72.083	72.500	74.167	74.375	73.125	73.250
7	Spain	Rafael Soto	Invasor	72.292	72.500	73.958	72.917	72.292	72.792
8	Germany	Hubertus Schmidt	Wansuela Suerte	74.167	73.333	72.292	70.000	71.875	72.333
9	United States	Robert Dover	Kennedy	72.083	72.083	72.083	71.250	70.625	71.625
10	Germany	Heike Kemmer	Bonaparte	71.250	70.625	71.875	72.917	69.792	71.292
10	Spain	Juan Antonio Jimenez	Guizo	71.458	70.208	69.583	72.708	72.500	71.292
12	Great Britain	Carl Hester	Escapado	70.208	70.625	71.042	71.458	70.000	70.667
12	Denmark	Per Sandgaard	Zancor	68.750	70.833	71.250	71.458	71.042	70.667
14	Netherlands	Sven Rothenberger	Barclay II	69.375	70.208	70.417	68.958	70.208	69.833
15	Netherlands	Imke Bartels	Lancet	70.625	69.375	68.333	68.542	71.875	69.750
16	United States	Guenter Seidel	Aragon	70.625	68.542	70.625	67.292	70.417	69.500
17	Denmark	Jon Pedersen	Esprit de Valdemar	69.375	67.292	70.625	68.125	69.583	69.000
18	United States	Lisa Wilcox	Relevant 5	68.542	68.125	70.000	69.583	67.708	68.792
20	Austria	Victoria Max-Theurer	Falcao	67.500	70.417	70.208	67.083	68.125	68.667
21	Great Britain	Richard Davison	Ballaseyr Royale	68.333	69.583	68.333	67.708	68.750	68.542
22	Denmark	Andreas Helgstrand	Cavan	68.750	68.958	69.167	67.917	66.875	68.333
25	Great Britain	Emma Hindle	Wie Weltmeyer	67.500	67.500	67.292	66.875	68.333	67.500
26	Austria	Nina Stadlinger	Egalite	65.625	67.500	69.792	67.500	66.458	67.375
28	Switzerland	Silvia Ikle	Salieri CH	66.042	66.458	67.083	68.333	67.292	67.042
29	Sweden	Tinne Vilhelmson	Just Mickey	68.333	65.625	67.500	65.625	67.500	66.917
30	Switzerland	Christian Plaege	Regent	65.417	68.750	67.917	67.708	63.542	66.667
31	Sweden	Louise Nathorst	Guinness	67.500	68.125	65.417	65.208	66.667	66.583
31	Canada	Cynthia Ishoy	Proton	65.417	66.667	67.917	68.333	64.583	66.583
34	Great Britain	Nicola McGivern	Active Walero	65.625	66.667	68.125	66.042	65.833	66.458
35	Canada	Leslie Reid	Mark	65.833	64.792	66.458	66.250	67.083	66.083
36	Canada	Belinda Trussell	Royan II	66.458	66.458	67.708	65.000	64.375	66.000
38	Denmark	Lone Joergensen	Ludewig G	63.333	66.875	68.125	65.208	65.208	65.750
40	Sweden	Minna Telde	Sack	65.833	64.375	66.042	66.250	64.375	65.375
41	Spain	Ignacio Rambla	Oleaje	65.417	64.792	65.417	65.000	63.125	64.750
42	Canada	Ashley Holzer	Imperioso	64.583	65.625	65.833	64.583	62.708	64.667
43	Netherlands	Marlies van Baalen	Idocus	62.708	65.625	65.208	65.833	63.542	64.583
44	Austria	Friedrich Gaulhofer	Wels	62.917	63.333	63.542	65.417	63.125	63.667
45	Switzerland	Daniel Ramseier	Palladio	62.083	65.625	63.333	63.750	61.458	63.250
48	Austria	Peter Gmoser	Don Debussy	62.292	62.292	62.917	64.167	62.083	62.750
WD	Switzerland	Jasmien Sanche-Burger	Mr G de Lully

=== By team ===
Each team consisted of four pairs of horse and rider. The scores of the top three pairs from each team were averaged to get the team score.

1. Germany - 74.563
  - Ulla Salzgeber riding Rusty, 78.208
  - Martin Schaudt riding Weltall, 73.417
  - Hubertus Schmidt riding Wansuela Suerte, 72.333
  - Heike Kemmer riding Bonaparte, ~~71.292~~
2. Spain - 72.917
  - Beatriz Ferrer-Salat riding Beauvalais, 74.667
  - Rafael Soto riding Invasor, 72.792
  - Juan Antonio Jimenez riding Guizo, 71.292
  - Ignacio Rambla riding Oleaje, ~~64.750~~
3. United States - 71.500
  - Deborah McDonald riding Brentina, 73.375
  - Robert Dover riding Kennedy, 71.625
  - Guenter Seidel riding Aragon, 69.500
  - Lisa Wilcox riding Relevant 5, ~~68.792~~
4. Netherlands - 71.264
  - Anky van Grunsven riding Salinero, 74.208
  - Sven Rothenberger riding Barclay II, 69.833
  - Imke Bartels riding Lancet, 69.750
  - Marlies van Baalen riding Idocus, ~~64.583~~
5. Denmark - 69.333
  - Per Sandgaard riding Zancor, 70.667
  - Jon Pedersen riding Esprit de Valdemar, 69.000
  - Andreas Helgstrand riding Cavan, 68.333
  - Lone Joergensen riding Ludewig G, ~~65.750~~
6. Sweden - 68.917
  - Jan Brink riding Briar, 73.250
  - Tinne Vilhelmson riding Just Mickey, 66.917
  - Louise Nathorst riding Guinness, 66.583
  - Minna Telde riding Sack, 65.375
7. Great Britain - 68.903
  - Carl Hester riding Escapado, 70.667
  - Richard Davison riding Ballaseyr Royale, 68.542
  - Emma Hindle riding Wie Weltmeyer, 67.500
  - Nicola McGivern riding Active Walero, ~~66.458~~
8. Austria - 66.570
  - Victoria Max-Theurer riding Falcao, 68.667
  - Nina Stadlinger riding Egalite, 67.375
  - Friedrich Gaulhofer riding Wels, 63.667
  - Peter Gmoser riding Don Debussy, ~~62.750~~
9. Canada - 66.222
  - Cynthia Ishoy riding Proton, 66.583
  - Leslie Reid riding Mark, 66.083
  - Belinda Trussell riding Royan II, 66.000
  - Ashley Holzer riding Imperioso, ~~64.667~~
10. Switzerland - 65.653
  - Silvia Ikle riding Salieri CH, 67.042
  - Christian Plaege riding Regent, 66.667
  - Daniel Ramseier riding Palladio, 63.250
  - Jasmine Sanche-Burger riding Mr G de Lully, ~~WD~~
