= Flim Flam (horse) =

Dressage horse (1987–2004)

- Breed: Hanoverian
- Discipline: Dressage
- Sire: Wilhelm Tell I
- Grandsire: Wedekind
- Dam: Cilia
- Maternal grandsire: Cavalier
- Sex: Gelding
- Foaled: March 27, 1987
- Country: United States
- Color: Dark Bay
- Owner: Fritz Kundrun
- Trainer: Sue Blinks

Flim Flam
Medal record

Representing United States

Equestrian
Bronze medal – third place	2000 Sydney	Team Dressage
Silver medal – second place	2002 Jerez de la Frontera	Team Dressage

Flim Flam (March 27, 1987–October 28, 2004) was a Hanoverian dressage horse who, along with rider Sue Blinks, competed for the United States at the 2000 Olympics. The pair was eighth in the individual competition and was part of the bronze medal-winning US team. Flim Flam was sired by the stallion Wilhelm Tell I, out of the mare, Cilia.

== Life and career ==
Flim Flam was foaled in 1987, out of Cilia and by Wilhelm Tell I. He was a dark bay who stood 16.1 hands (65 inches, 165 cm) at maturity. Flim Flam began training with rider Sue Blinks at two and a half years old. He was owned by Fritz Kundrun and Renate Kundrun, who bought him initially hoping he could be an approved Hanoverian breeding stallion as well as a dressage hopeful. However, after he placed third at the Bundeschampionate, Kundrun realized the horse could not be successful in dressage as a stallion, so Flim Flam was castrated and went on to succeed as a dressage horse.

Flim Flam's first major international competition was in 1998, at the World Equestrian Games in Rome. He and rider Sue Blinks finished 12th individually and 4th as part of the US team. In 2000, Flim Flam and Blinks won the US Equestrian Team National Grand Prix Championship. It was stated that he could quietly "steal" the show. The horse was listed as being in the top half-dozen Grand Prix level dressage horses competing at the time.

Flim Flam competed for the United States in the 2000 Olympic Games in Sydney, Australia with Blinks, winning 8th individually and taking the bronze team medal with fellow members Robert Dover, Guenter Seidel, and Christine Traurig. Jane Savoie was credited with coaching the pair; She had helped Blinks with Flim Flam since he was three years old. In 2001, Flim Flam won first place in the Dressage Special and second place in the Grand Prix dressage competition at the Devon Horse Show. Blinks and Flim Flam were the leading horse-rider pair on the United States' silver medal dressage team at the 2002 World Equestrian Games, topping their 1998 win.

After his retirement in the summer of 2004, Flim Flam was relaxing in a field when he showed signs of colic. After his condition was noticed, he was taken to the Palm Beach Equine in Wellington, Florida. Flim Flam died October 28, 2004, of complications arising from colic surgery; his stomach burst, causing him to be euthanized on the operating table. He was 17 years old.

== Legacy ==
Breyer Animal Creations released a model horse based on Flim Flam between 2003 and 2004. Blinks credits the horse as having been "a huge part of my education" as a rider and competitor. She also noted one of his strengths, saying, "He can piaffe forever, basically."

== Pedigree ==
Through his sire, Film Flam is the "nephew" of Wilhelm Tell II. Wilhelm Tell II is the sire of many notable Show Jumping/Dressage horses.

Pedigree of Flim Flam
Sire Wilhelm Tell I	Wedekind	Ferdinand	Ferrara
Sire Wilhelm Tell I	Wedekind	Ferdinand	Herzenskind
Sire Wilhelm Tell I	Wedekind	Atlasmaedel	Athos
Sire Wilhelm Tell I	Wedekind	Atlasmaedel	Koenigsliebe
Sire Wilhelm Tell I	Donauliese	Don Carlos	Dominik
Sire Wilhelm Tell I	Donauliese	Don Carlos	Fasanenmoos
Sire Wilhelm Tell I	Donauliese	Festglorie	Fernruf
Sire Wilhelm Tell I	Donauliese	Festglorie	Frisenblume
Dam Cilia	Cavalier	Cardinal	Off Key
Dam Cilia	Cavalier	Cardinal	Chevaliers Star
Dam Cilia	Cavalier	Fackel	Ferdinand
Dam Cilia	Cavalier	Fackel	Asternprinzess
Dam Cilia	Liebelei	Lugano II	Der Loewe
Dam Cilia	Liebelei	Lugano II	Altwunder
Dam Cilia	Liebelei	Dascha	Domaenenrat I
Dam Cilia	Liebelei	Dascha	Astgirl
