= Mepham =

Mepham is a surname. Notable people with the surname include:

- Chris Mepham (born 1997), Welsh footballer
- Dennis Mepham (born 1958), American soccer player
- Kirsty Mepham (born 1969), British equestrian
- Simon Mepeham (died 1333), English bishop
