= Wilhelm Tell II =

- Breed: Hanoverian
- Discipline: Show jumping
- Sire: Wedekind
- Grandsire: Ferdinand
- Dam: Donauliese
- Maternal grandsire: Don Carlos
- Sex: Stallion
- Foaled: January 1, 1980
- Country: Foaled in Germany, imported to the United States in 1985
- Color: Black
- Breeder: Klaus Jungclaus
- Owner: David G. Horsburgh

Record
- Free jumping 6'5

Wilhelm Tell II (January 1, 1980- 2008) or Wilhelm Tell, was a black Hanoverian horse foaled in Germany. He was sired by Wedekind, out of Donauliese.

== Life and career ==
Wilhelm Tell was foaled on January 1, 1980 in Germany. He was sired by Wedekind, out of the mare Donauliese. Wilhelm Tell was brown/black and recorded to be 165 centimetres (16.1 hands; 65 in) tall. His highest recorded free jump was 6'5.

Wilhelm Tell II was imported to the United States in 1985 from Niedersaches Landgestut Celle as a breeding stallion. After that, his main use was to be a stud horse.

He died in the summer of 2008 due to cancer.

== Pedigree ==
Being the colt of Wedekind and Donauliese, Wilhelm Tell II is a full brother to Wilhelm Tell I. Wilhelm Tell I is the sire of the 2002 Olympic dressage team member, Flim Flam with partner Sue Blinks.

Pedigree of Wilhelm Tell II
Sire Wedekind	Ferdinand	Ferrara	Feinschnitti
Sire Wedekind	Ferdinand	Ferrara	Arlenda
Sire Wedekind	Ferdinand	Herzenskind	Helgoland I
Sire Wedekind	Ferdinand	Herzenskind	Irland
Sire Wedekind	Atlasmaedal	Athos	Allerhand
Sire Wedekind	Atlasmaedal	Athos	Anghris
Sire Wedekind	Atlasmaedal	Koenigsliebe	Koerting
Sire Wedekind	Atlasmaedal	Koenigsliebe	Candidat II Mare
Dam Donauliese	Don Carlos	Dominik	Doemitz I
Dam Donauliese	Don Carlos	Dominik	Abendglueck
Dam Donauliese	Don Carlos	Fasanenmoos	Farina
Dam Donauliese	Don Carlos	Fasanenmoos	Flottenmanover
Dam Donauliese	Festglorie	Fernruf	Fermor III
Dam Donauliese	Festglorie	Fernruf	Fernroeschen
Dam Donauliese	Festglorie	Friesenblume	Friesenkoenig
Dam Donauliese	Festglorie	Friesenblume	Sporthaus
