= Stefan Peter =

Stefan Peter may refer to:

- Stefan Peter (swimmer)
- Stefan Peter (equestrian)
