= Svetlana Knyazeva =

Russian equestrian

Personal information
- Nationality: Russian
- Born: 29 May 1970 (age 54); Nizhny Novgorod, Russia

Sport
- Sport: Equestrian

Svetlana Knyazeva (born 29 May 1970) is a Russian equestrian. She competed in the individual dressage event at the 2000 Summer Olympics.
