= Rachael Sanna =

Australian equestrian

Personal information
- Nationality: Australian
- Born: 17 December 1972 (age 53) Sydney, New South Wales, Australia

Sport
- Country: Australia
- Sport: Equestrian
- Event: Dressage

Rachael Sanna (née Downs) (born 17 December 1972 in Sydney, New South Wales) is an Australian equestrian. She competed at the Sydney 2000 Olympics in the individual and the team dressage events. Riding Aphrodite, she finished in 33rd place in the individual event, while the Australian team of Kristy Oatley-Nist, Ricky MacMillan, Mary Hanna and Sanna finished 6th in the team event. She is married to fellow Australian equestrian George Sanna.
