= Gerta Lehmann =

Greek equestrian (born 1979)

Personal information
- Nationality: Greek
- Born: 21 July 1979 (age 45); Cagnes-sur-Mer, France

Sport
- Sport: Equestrian

Gerta Lehmann (born 21 July 1979) is a Greek former equestrian. She competed in the individual dressage event at the 2004 Summer Olympics.
