= Heidi Svanborg =

Finnish equestrian (born 1970)

Personal information
- Nationality: Finnish
- Born: 24 April 1970 (age 54); Espoo, Finland

Sport
- Sport: Equestrian

Heidi Svanborg (born 24 April 1970) is a Finnish equestrian. She competed in the individual dressage event at the 2000 Summer Olympics.
