= Andrea John =

Austrian dressage rider

Personal information
- Nationality: Austrian, German
- Born: September 26, 1976 (age 49) Munich, Germany

Sport
- Country: Austria
- Sport: Dressage

Achievements and titles
- World finals: 2002 FEI World Equestrian Games

Andrea John is a German born dressage rider competing for Austria. Andrea represented Austria at the 2002 FEI World Equestrian Games in Jerez de la Frontera, Spain. She competed at three European Championships; in Verden 2001, Hickstead 2003 and at the 2013 European Championships in Herning.
