= Ricky MacMillan =

Australian equestrian

Personal information
- Born: Erica MacMillan; 24 September 1961 (age 64) Surat, Queensland, Australia

Sport
- Country: Australia
- Sport: Equestrian
- Event: Dressage

Ricky MacMillan (born 24 September 1961 in Surat, Queensland) is an Australian equestrian, international dressage judge, chair of Equestrian Australia and dentist.

Born as Erica MacMillan, she competed at the Sydney 2000 Olympics in the individual and the team dressage events. Riding Crisp, she finished in 35th place in the individual event, while the Australian team of Kristy Oatley, Mary Hanna, Rachael Downs and MacMillan finished 6th in the team event.

She subsequently competed at the Athens 2004 Olympics in the individual dressage event. Again riding Crisp, she finished 37th in the individual event.

Following her retirement from competition, MacMillan now acts as an international dressage judge.

In April 2019 MacMillan was appointed to the board of Equestrian Australia, and became chair of the board in November of the same year at the annual general meeting.

MacMillan is also a dentist and principal of a dental practice on the Gold Coast.
