= Jorge da Rocha =

Brazilian equestrian

Personal information
- Born: 17 September 1945 (age 81) Rio de Janeiro, Brazil

Sport
- Sport: Equestrian

Jorge da Rocha (born 17 September 1945) is a Brazilian equestrian. He competed in the individual dressage event at the 2000 Summer Olympics.
