= Jane Savoie =

American sportsperson and writer (1949–2021)

Jane Savoie (15 April 1949 – 4 January 2021) was an American sportsperson and writer.

== Life ==
Jane Savoie was born in 1949 in Worcester, Massachusetts. She spent her early life in Natick, Massachusetts. She attended the University of Massachusetts at Amherst to earn a bachelor's degree in animal sciences.

During the 1992 Olympics, she was part of the U.S. Olympic dressage team as a reserve. She was also a coach of Susan Blinks.

During her career she won National Freestyle Championships title three times.

Her debut book That Winning Feeling! Program Your Mind for Peak Performance was published in 1992. Her books have been translated into multiple languages.

In 2019 she was inducted into the USDF Hall of Fame.

Savoie died in 2021 from cancer.

== Recognition ==
- 2019: USDF Hall of Fame

== Bibliography ==
- That Winning Feeling (1992)
- More Cross Training (1998)
- Horses of a Lifetime (1998)
- It's Not Just About the Ribbons (2003)
- Dressage 101: The Ultimate Source of Dressage Basics in a Language You Can Understand (2011)
- Jane Savoie's Dressage Between the Jumps (2020)
- Second Chances (2020)
