= Louisa Hill =

New Zealand equestrian

Personal information
- Nationality: New Zealand
- Born: 2 March 1962 (age 63); Takapuna, New Zealand

Sport
- Sport: Equestrian
- Event: Dressage

Louisa Hill (born 2 March 1962) is a New Zealand dressage rider. She represented New Zealand at the 2004 Summer Olympics in the individual dressage, finishing 49th and at the 2012 Summer Olympics in the individual dressage, finishing 48th.
