= Alexandra Sourla =

Greek equestrian (born 1973)

Personal information
- Nationality: Greek
- Born: 15 January 1973 (age 52); Athens, Greece

Sport
- Sport: Equestrian

Alexandra Sourla (born 15 January 1973) is a Greek equestrian who competed in the individual dressage event at the 2004 Summer Olympics.
