= Kallista Field =

New Zealand equestrian

Personal information
- Nationality: New Zealand
- Born: 7 July 1978 (age 47) Pahiatua, New Zealand

Sport
- Sport: Equestrian

Kallista Field (born 7 July 1978) is a New Zealand equestrian. She competed in the individual dressage event at the 2000 Summer Olympics.

In 2024, Field was inducted into the Equestrian Sports New Zealand Hall of Fame.
