= Leslie Reid (equestrian) =

Canadian equestrian

Personal information
- Born: July 2, 1956 (age 69)
Medal record
Equestrian
Representing Canada
Pan American Games
Gold medal – first place	1991 Havana	Team dressage
Gold medal – first place	2003 Santo Domingo	Individual dressage
Silver medal – second place	2003 Santo Domingo	Team dressage

Leslie Reid (born 2 July 1956) is a Canadian Olympic dressage rider. She competed at two Summer Olympics (in 2004 and 2008). Her best Olympic result came at the 2008 Beijing Games, where she achieved 8th position in the team dressage competition. Meanwhile, her best individual Olympic placing is 35th place from 2004.

Reid participated at two Pan American Games (in 1999 and 2003). At the 2003 Pan American Games held in Santo Domingo, Dominican Republic, she won an individual gold and a team silver. Reid also competed at the 2005 edition of the Dressage World Cup Final, finishing in 17th position.
