= 2002 FEI World Equestrian Games =

- Host city: Jerez de la Frontera, Spain
- Nations: 48
- Events: 15 in 7 disciplines
- Opening: 10 September 2002
- Closing: 22 September 2002

The 2002 FEI World Equestrian Games were held in Jerez de la Frontera, Spain, from 10 to 22 September 2002. They were the 4th edition of the games which are held every four years and run by the FEI.

== Venue ==
The main venue was the Estadio Municipal de Chapín. It was remodeled for the event.

== Officials ==
Appointment of (Olympic disciplines) officials is as follows:

Dressage

- (Germany) Volker Moritz (Ground Jury President)
- (Belgium) Mariëtte Withages (Ground Jury Member)
- (Netherlands) Jan Peeters (Ground Jury Member)
- (South Africa) Ernst Holz (Ground Jury Member)
- (Canada) Elizabeth McMullen (Ground Jury Member)

Eventing

- (Republic of Ireland) Jean Scott Mitchell (Ground Jury President)
- (Canada) Cara Whitham (Ground Jury Member)
- (Germany) Christoph Hess (Ground Jury Member)
- (France) Guy Othéguy (Technical Delegate)

== Events ==
15 events in 7 disciplines were held in Jerez de la Frontera. 2002 was the first year that reining was held at the World Equestrian Games.

Dressage	Driving	Endurance	Eventing	Jumping	Reining	Vaulting
Individual	Individual	Individual	Individual	Individual	Individual	Individual Female
Individual	Individual	Individual	Individual	Individual	Individual	Individual Male
Team	Team	Team	Team	Team	Team	Team

== Medal summary ==
=== Medalists ===
Event	Gold	Silver	Bronze
Individual dressage	Nadine Capellmann on Farbenfroh; Germany	Beatriz Ferrer-Salat on Beauvalais; Spain	Ulla Salzgeber on Rusty; Germany
Team dressage	Germany (GER); Nadine Capellmann on Farbenfroh; Ulla Salzgeber on Rusty; Klaus Husenbeth on Picollino; Ann-Kathrin Linsenhoff on Renoir-Unicef	United States (USA); Debbie McDonald on Brentina; Lisa Wilcox on Relevant; Susan Blinks on Flim Flam; Guenter Seidel on Nikolaus	Spain (ESP); Beatriz Ferrer-Salat on Beauvalais; Rafael Soto on Invasor; Juan Antonio Jimenez on Guizo; Ignacio Rambla on Granadero
Individual driving	Ijsbrand Chardon; Netherlands	Christoph Sandmann; Germany	Tomas Eriksson; Sweden
Team driving	Netherlands (NED); Ijsbrand Chardon; Mark Weusthof; Ton Monhemius	United States (USA); Tucker Johnson; Chester Weber; James Fairclough	Germany (GER); Christoph Sandmann; Rainer Duen; Michael Freund
Individual endurance	Sh. Ahmed bin Mohd al Maktoum on Bowman; United Arab Emirates	Antonio Rosi on Alex Raggio di Sole; Italy	Sunny Demedy on Castlebar Treaty; France
Team endurance	France (FRA); Emmanuelle Bellefroid on Antinea de Nau; Jean-Philippe Frances on Djellab; Sunny Demedy on Castlebar Treaty; Maya Killa Perringerard on Varoussa	Italy (ITA); Roberto Busi on Al Jasir; Antonio Rosi on Alex Raggio di Sole; Fausto Fiorucci on Faris Jabar; Mario Cutolo on Zyad el Asii	Australia (AUS); Kristie McGaffin on Castelbar Macleod; Penelope Toft on Bremervale Justice; Meg Wade on Castelbar Treaty; Susan Crockett on Jonah
Individual eventing	Jean Teulère on Espoir de la Mare; France	Jeanette Brakewell on Over To You; Great Britain	Piia Pantsu on Ypäjä Karuso; Finland
Team eventing	United States (USA); John Williams on Carrick; Kimberly Vinoski on Winsome Adante; David O'Connor on Giltedge; Amy Tryon on Poggio II	France (FRA); Cédric Lyard on Fine Merveille; Jean Teulère on Espoir de la Mare; Jean-Luc Force on Crocus Jacob; Didier Courrèges on Free Style	Great Britain (GBR); Jeanette Brakewell on Over To You; Pippa Funnell on Supreme Rock; William Fox-Pitt on Tamarillo; Leslie Law on Shear H2O
Individual jumping	Dermott Lennon on Liscalgot; Ireland	Eric Navet on Dollar du Murier Hits de Seine; France	Peter Wylde on Fein Cera; United States
Team jumping	France (FRA); Eric Levallois on Diamont de Semilly Ecolit; Reynald Angot on Tlaloc; Gilles Bertrán de Balanda on Crocus Graverie; Eric Navet on Dollar du Murier Hits de Seine	Sweden (SWE); Peter Eriksson on VDL Cardento; Royne Zetterman on Richmont Park; Helena Lundbäck on Utfors Mynta; Malin Baryard on H&M Butterfly Flip	Belgium (BEL); Philippe Lejeune on Nabab de Reve; Stanny van Paesschen on O da Pomme; Peter Postelmans on Oleander; Jos Lansink on AK Caridor Z
Individual reining	Shawn Flarida on San Jo Freckless; United States	Tom McCutcheon on Conquistador Whiz; United States	Shawna Sapergia on Pretty Much Eagle; Canada
Team reining	United States (USA); Tom McCutcheon on Conquistador Whiz; Scott McCutcheon on Inwhizable; Shawn Flarida on San Jo Freckless; Craig Schmersal on Tidal Wave Jack	Canada (CAN); François Gauthier on Ghost Buster Baby; Jason Grimshaw on Listo Pollito Lena; Shawna Sapergia on Pretty Much Eagle; Patrice St-Onge on Slip Me Another Kiss	Italy (ITA); Dario Carmignani on Frozen Sailor; Adriano Meacci on Jodi Tamara; Nic Cordioli on RS Little Red Jaba; Marco Manzi on Spanish Snapper
Men's vaulting	Matthias Lang on Farceur Breceen; France	Gero Meyer on Kolumbus; Germany	Devon Maitozo on Abu Dhabi; United States
Women's vaulting	Nadia Zulow on Rubins Universe; Germany	Rikke Laumann on Milano; Denmark	Ines Juckstow on Dallmers Little Foot; Germany
Squad vaulting	Germany (GER)	Switzerland (SUI)	Sweden (SWE)

=== Medal count ===
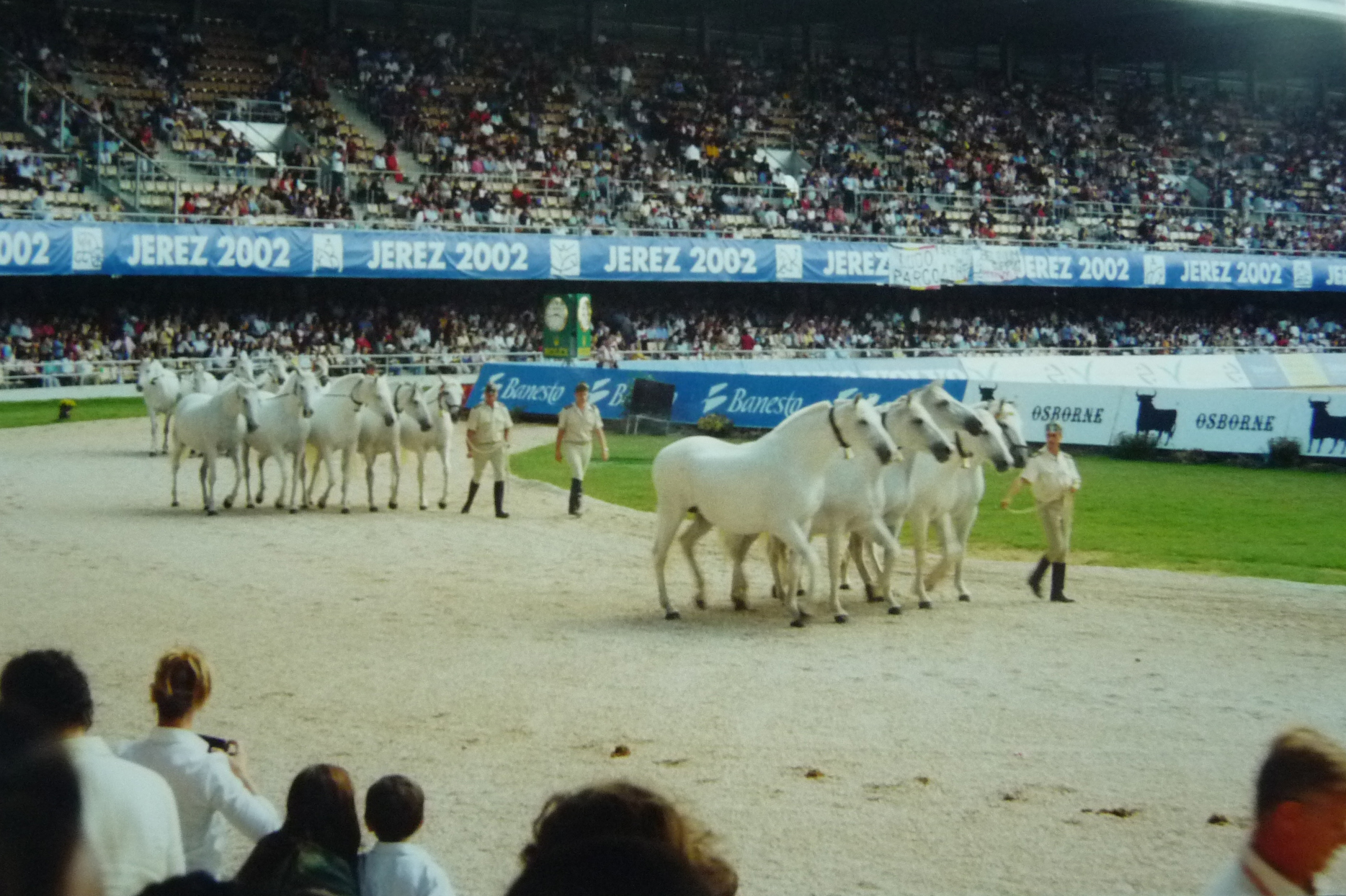
Estadio de Chapín

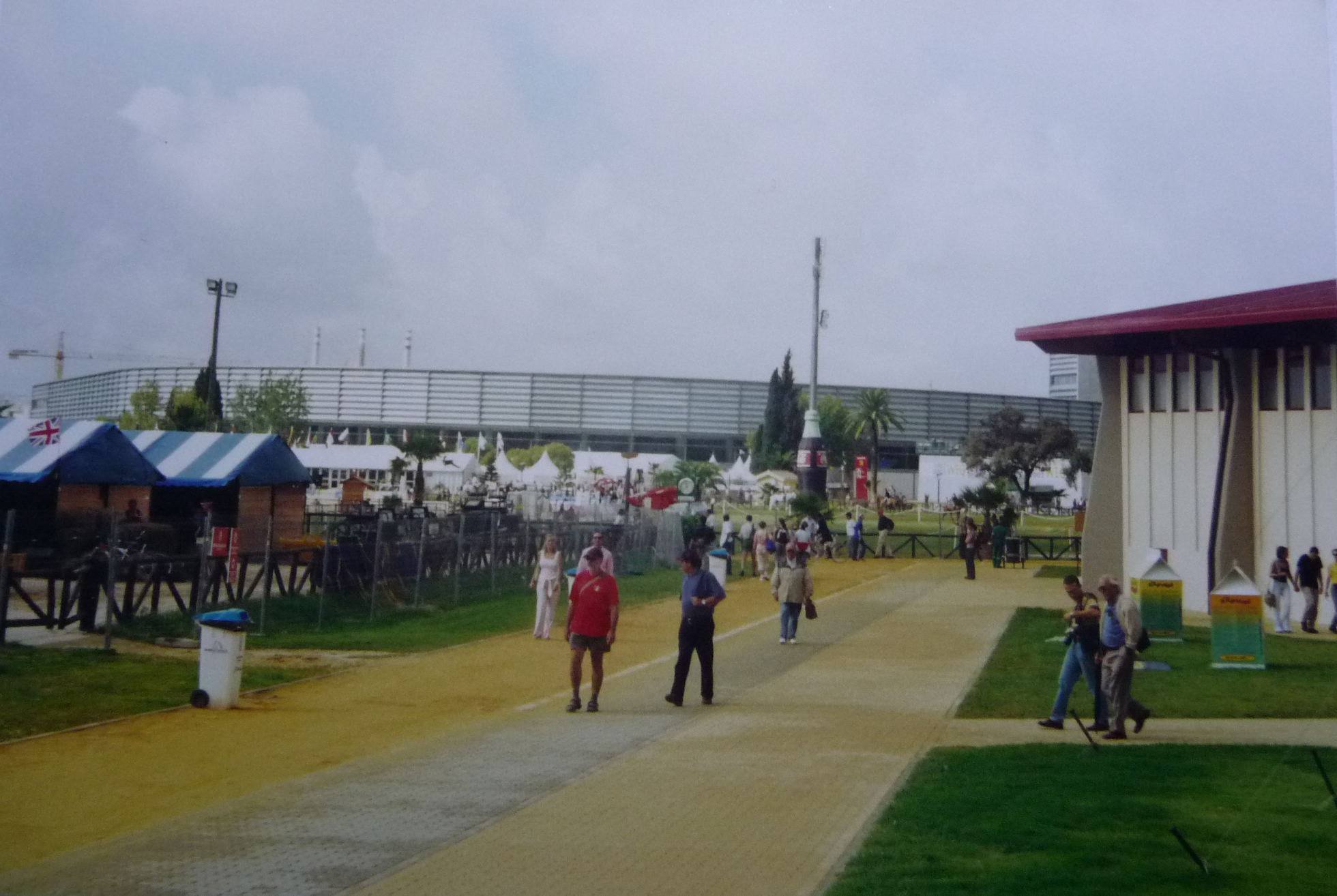
Estadio de Chapín

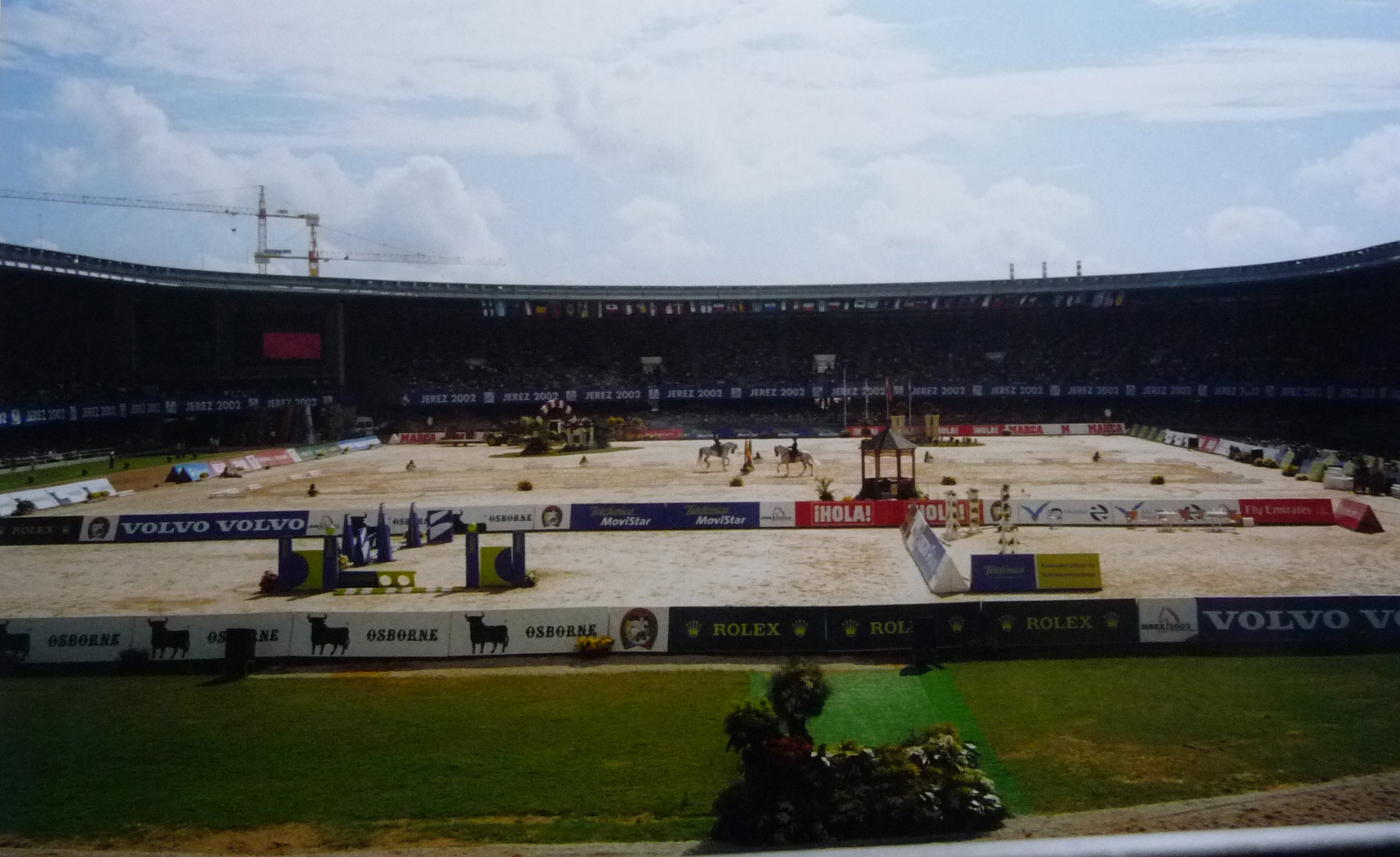
Estadio de Chapín

* Host nation (Spain)

Rank	Nation	Gold	Silver	Bronze	Total
1	Germany (GER)	4	2	3	9
2	France (FRA)	4	2	1	7
3	United States (USA)	3	3	2	8
4	Netherlands (NED)	2	0	0	2
5	Ireland (IRL)	1	0	0	1
5	United Arab Emirates (UAE)	1	0	0	1
7	Italy (ITA)	0	2	1	3
8	Sweden (SWE)	0	1	2	3
9	Canada (CAN)	0	1	1	2
9	Great Britain (GBR)	0	1	1	2
9	Spain (ESP)*	0	1	1	2
12	Denmark (DEN)	0	1	0	1
12	Switzerland (SUI)	0	1	0	1
14	Australia (AUS)	0	0	1	1
14	Belgium (BEL)	0	0	1	1
14	Finland (FIN)	0	0	1	1
Totals (16 entries)		15	15	15	45
