= Nadine Capellmann =

German equestrian

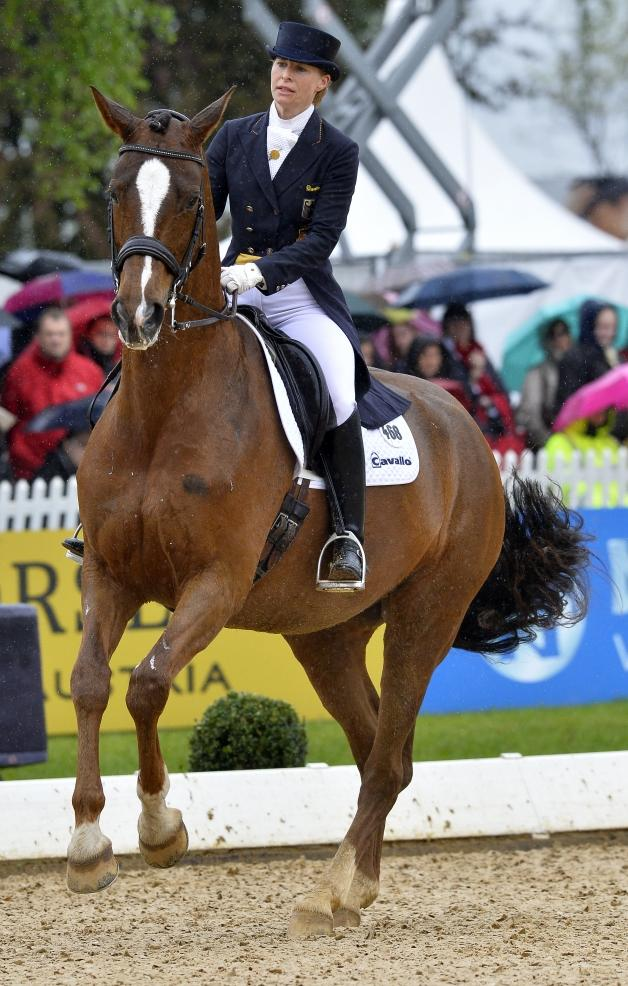
- Capellmann and Girasol (2013)

Personal information
- Born: 9 July 1965 (age 60); Würselen, West Germany

Website
- nadine-capellmann.de
Medal record
Equestrian
Representing Germany
Olympic Games
Gold medal – first place	2000 Sydney	Team dressage
Gold medal – first place	2008 Beijing	Team dressage
World Championships
Gold medal – first place	1998 Rome	Team dressage
Gold medal – first place	2002 Jerez	Individual dressage
Gold medal – first place	2002 Jerez	Team dressage
Gold medal – first place	2006 Aachen	Team dressage
European Championships
Gold medal – first place	1997 Verden	Team dressage
Gold medal – first place	1999 Arnhem	Team dressage
Gold medal – first place	2001 Verden	Team dressage
Silver medal – second place	2007 La Mandria	Team dressage
Bronze medal – third place	2001 Verden	Individual dressage

Nadine Capellmann (born 9 July 1965 in Würselen) is a German equestrian who has won been a part of two gold medalist teams in Team dressage. The first was at the 2000 Summer Olympics and the second at the 2008 Summer Olympics.
