= Elisabet Ehrnrooth =

Finnish equestrian

Personal information
- Full name: Filippa Josefin Elisabet Ehrnrooth
- Nationality: Finnish
- Discipline: Dressage
- Born: 2 May 1967 (age 57); Nyköping, Sweden

Filippa Josefin Elisabet Ehrnrooth (born 2 May 1967) is a Finnish equestrian. She competed in the individual dressage event at the 2000 Summer Olympics.

In 2024 she was first reserve for the Finnish dressage team at the 2024 Summer Olympics in Paris, France.
