= Lisa Wilcox (equestrian) =

American equestrian

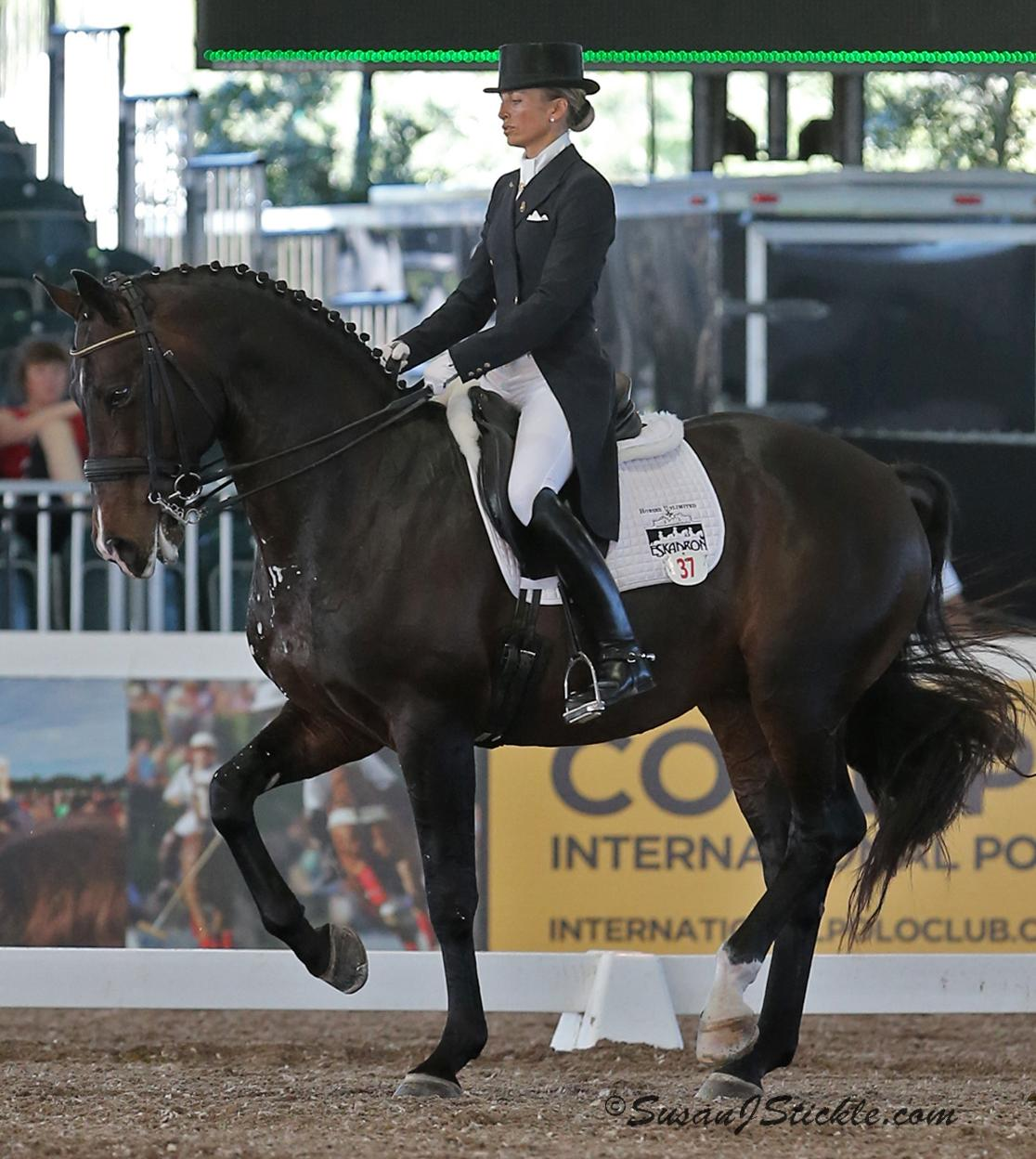
- Lisa Wilcox riding Pikko del Cerro (2013)

Personal information
- Born: September 8, 1966 (age 59)
Medal record
Equestrian
Representing United States
Olympic Games
Bronze medal – third place	2004 Athens	Team dressage
World Championships
Silver medal – second place	2002 Jerez	Team dressage

Lisa Margrit Wilcox (born September 8, 1966 in Thousand Oaks, California) is an equestrian riding instructor best known for her success in dressage. Lisa has won ribbons in approximately 660 competitions, including the team silver medal at the FEI World Equestrian Games in 2002 and a bronze medal in team dressage in the 2004 summer olympics.

Though Wilcox is originally from Colorado, in 1994 she moved to Germany to train under Herbert Rehbein and has spent the majority of her time living and riding in Europe since then. In addition to riding, Wilcox has also appeared as a model for the European fashion boutique A'Dashi.

In 2006, Wilcox worked with Rick Rockefeller-Silvia and two of his stallions at the Raleigh CDI, as well as at a Pas de deux exhibition in Florida. One stallion, Lullaby, became the United States Equestrian Team's alternate for the Young Horse World Championships in 2006.
