= Rick Rockefeller-Silvia =

Richard Rockefeller-Silvia (born September 9, 1984) is an American equestrian, humanitarian, and travel writer. A descendant of the Rockefeller family, he is best known for founding Dream Street Stallions, Inc., a prominent U.S. dressage operation known for importing and promoting European sport horses.

Rockefeller-Silvia trained in Europe as a young adult and competed internationally before returning to the United States, where he became the youngest owner in history to win the Grand Championship at the Devon Horse Show in 2008—a record that still stands. He is also a United States Dressage Federation (USDF) Gold Medalist, with a competition career that includes multiple national placements at the FEI and Grand Prix levels.

== Philanthropy and community involvement ==
Rockefeller-Silvia has been active in philanthropic efforts within the equestrian and broader Palm Beach communities. He founded Dressage Under the Stars, a Wellington-based charity gala that combined equestrian performances with community fundraising, benefiting cancer research and youth outreach programs. He also performed at the 2015 American Equestrians Got Talent fundraiser, which was covered by the Sun Sentinel. In 2019, he served as Junior Gentleman Co-Chair of the American Red Cross Gala held at Mar-a-Lago, one of the organization’s premier Palm Beach events.

== Current work ==
Rockefeller-Silvia currently resides in Southeast Asia. Through his website, RickSilvia.com, he documents his experiences living abroad, with a focus on mindful exploration, cultural immersion, and volunteer work throughout the region.
