= Per Sandgaard =

Danish equestrian

Personal information
- Nationality: Danish, Swedish
- Born: 13 March 1967 (age 59)

Sport
- Sport: Equestrian
Medal record
Equestrian
Representing Sweden
European Championships
Bronze medal – third place	2007 La Mandria	Team dressage

Per Sandgaard (born 13 March 1967) is a Danish-Swedish equestrian. He competed in two events at the 2004 Summer Olympics.
