= Nicola McGivern =

British equestrian

Personal information
- Born: 7 December 1966 (age 59) Stirling, Scotland

Sport
- Sport: Equestrian
Medal record
Equestrian
Representing Great Britain
European Championships
Bronze medal – third place	2003 Hickstead	Team dressage

Nicola McGivern (born 7 December 1966) is a British equestrian. She competed in two events at the 2004 Summer Olympics.
