= Alexandra Simons de Ridder =

German equestrian

Medal record

Equestrian

Representing Germany

Olympic Games
Gold medal – first place	2000 Sydney	Dressage, team

Alexandra Simons de Ridder (born 29 October 1963) is a German equestrian and Olympic champion. She won a gold medal in team dressage at the 2000 Summer Olympics in Sydney with the team from Germany.
