= Stefan Peter (equestrian) =

Austrian equestrian

Personal information
- Nationality: Austrian
- Born: 10 April 1975 (age 51) Bregenz, Austria

Sport
- Sport: Equestrian

Stefan Peter (born 10 April 1975) is an Austrian equestrian. He competed in the individual dressage event at the 2000 Summer Olympics.
