= Marlies van Baalen =

Dutch dressage rider

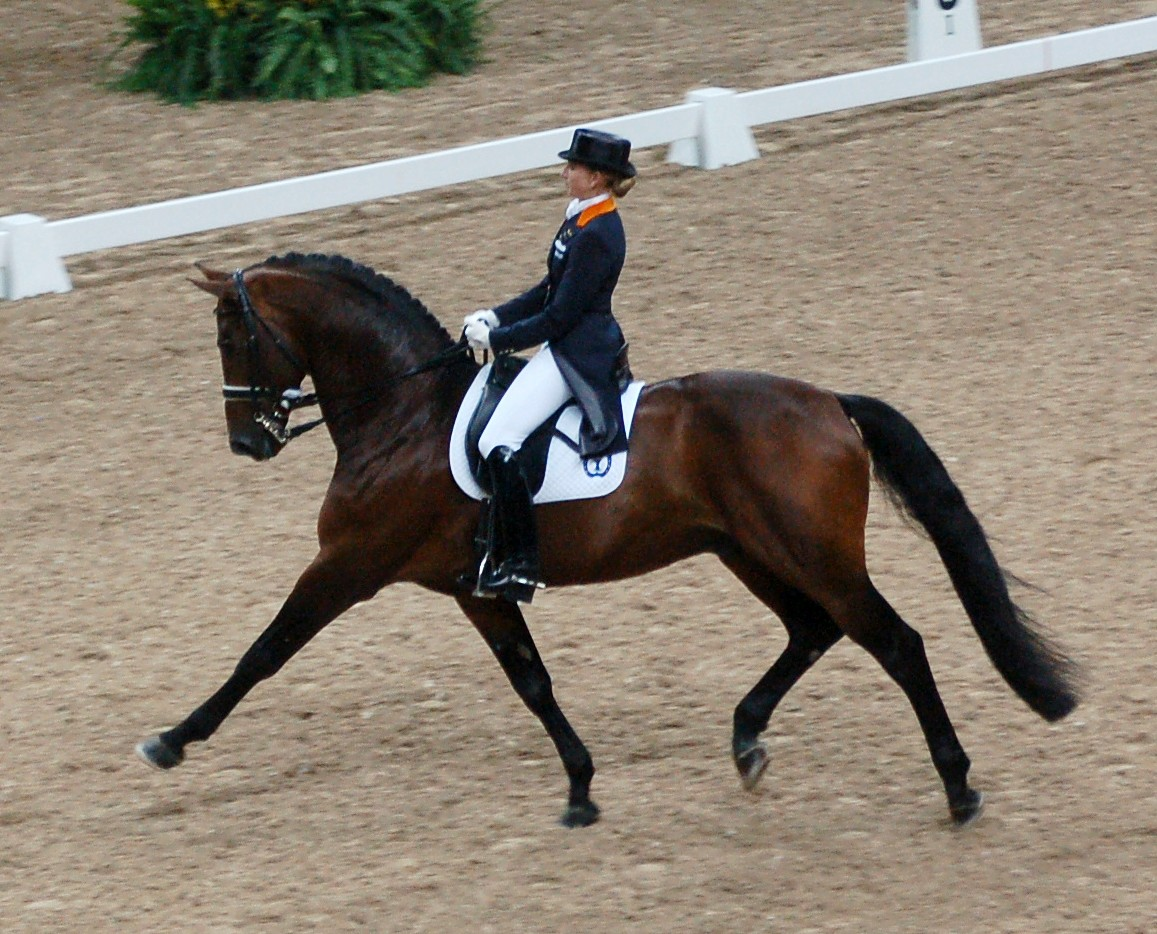
- Marlies van Baalen riding Kigali (2007)

Personal information
- Nationality: Dutch
- Born: Marlies Anne van Baalen; 30 August 1980 (age 45) Den Bosch, Netherlands
- Website: www.dressuurstalvanbaalen.nl

Sport
- Country: Netherlands
- Sport: Dressage
- Coached by: Coby van Baalen, Nicole Werner

Achievements and titles
- Olympic finals: Athens 2004, Tokyo 2020

Marlies Anne van Baalen (born 30 August 1980 in Den Bosch, North Brabant) is a Dutch Dressage equestrian. She is Coby van Baalen's daughter.

Van Baalen represented the Netherlands at the 2004 Summer Olympics where she finished in 43rd position in the individual rankings. With the Dutch dressage team, in which she featured with Anky van Grunsven, Sven Rothenberger and Imke Bartels, she finished just outside the medal spots with the fourth place.

She was the first reserve for the Dutch team during the European Championships in Rotterdam 2011. In 2021, she represented The Netherlands at the Olympic Games in Tokyo with her horse Go Legend, finishing 20th in both Grand Prix and Grand Prix Special.

== Dressage results ==
=== Olympic Games ===
Event	Team	Individual	Freestyle	Horse
(Greece) Athens 2004	4th	43rd	—	Idocus
(Japan) Tokyo 2020	5th	20th	—	Go Legend

=== European Championships ===
Event	Team	Individual	Freestyle	Horse
(Germany) 2021 Hagen	5th	26rd	—	Go Legend
(Germany) 2023 Riesenbeck	5th	17th	15th	Habibi DVB

=== World Cup ===
==== Final ====
Event	Rank	Horse
(Sweden) 2003 Gothenburg	10th	Idocus
(Germany) 2004 Düsseldorf	7th	Idocus
(United States) 2007 Las Vegas	9th	Kigali
(Sweden) 2013 Gothenburg	12th	Miciano
