= Christine Traurig =

American equestrian

Personal information
- Born: 13 March 1957 (age 69) Nienburg, Lower Saxony, Germany
Medal record
Equestrian
Representing the United States
Olympic Games
Bronze medal – third place	2000 Sydney	Team dressage

Christine Traurig (born 13 March 1957) is an American equestrian. She was born in Nienburg, Lower Saxony, Germany. She won a bronze medal in team dressage at the 2000 Summer Olympics in Sydney, together with Robert Dover, Susan Blinks and Guenter Seidel.
