= Markopoulo Olympic Equestrian Centre =

Sports venue in Athens, Greece

Coordinates: 37°52′40″N 23°58′19″E

The Markopoulo Olympic Equestrian Centre hosted the equestrian events at the 2004 Summer Olympics in Athens, Greece. The venue is located at Markópoulo on the outskirts of the Athens suburbs. It was completed in December 2003 and officially opened on 12 August 2004, shortly before the beginning of the competition. The capacity of the venue is 10,000 for the Jumping Event, 8,100 seats for the Dressage and 15,000 seats for the Cross-Country Event.

In June 2007, Markopoulo Equestrian Centre held the three super special stages of the 54th Acropolis Rally. The site is also home to horse racing competitions and hosted the FEI European Jumping Championship for Children in June 2008.
