= Fritz Gaulhofer =

Austrian equestrian

Personal information
- Nationality: Austrian
- Born: 25 February 1966 (age 59); Weiz, Austria

Sport
- Sport: Equestrian

Fritz Gaulhofer (born 25 February 1966) is an Austrian former equestrian. He competed in two events at the 2004 Summer Olympics.
