= Patricia Bottani =

Swiss equestrian

Personal information
- Nationality: Swiss
- Born: 17 November 1974 (age 50); Zürich, Switzerland

Sport
- Sport: Equestrian

Patricia Bottani (born 17 November 1974) is a Swiss equestrian. She competed in two events at the 2000 Summer Olympics.
