= Lluis Lucio =

Spanish equestrian

Personal information
- Nationality: Spanish
- Born: 3 June 1958 (age 66); Barcelona, Spain

Sport
- Sport: Equestrian

Lluis Lucio (born 3 June 1958) is a Spanish equestrian. He competed in two events at the 2000 Summer Olympics.
