= Pether Markne =

Swedish equestrian

Personal information
- Nationality: Swedish
- Born: 27 July 1962 (age 62); Stockholm, Sweden

Sport
- Sport: Equestrian

Pether Markne (born 27 July 1962) is a Swedish equestrian. He competed in two events at the 2000 Summer Olympics.
