= Elena Sidneva =

Russian dressage rider

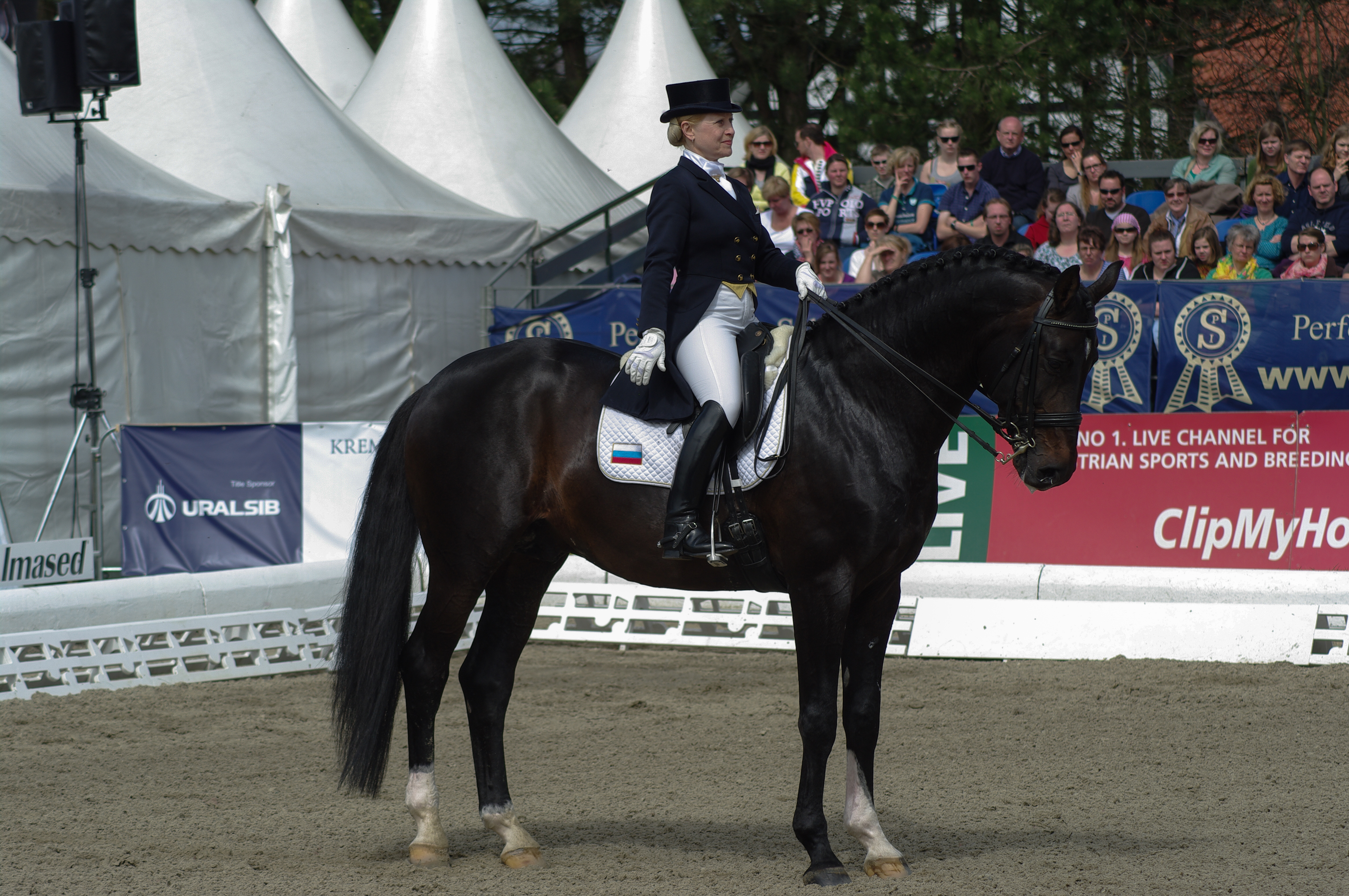

Personal information
- Born: 31 December 1964 (age 61) Moscow, Russia

Elena Sidneva (Russian: Елена Сиднева; born 31 December 1964) is a Russian dressage rider. She is a two-time Olympian. Her best Olympic result came in 2000 when she placed 24th in the individual dressage competition.

She received a wild card for the 2014 Dressage World Cup Final in Lyon after Denmark's Lars Petersen withdrew. At the final held in Lyon's Euroexpo she finished 13th. She also competed at the following World Cup final in 2015 held in Las Vegas, Nevada, where she finished 17th.
