= Kirsty Mepham =

British equestrian

Personal information
- Nationality: British
- Born: 13 August 1969 (age 55); Tonbridge, England

Sport
- Sport: Equestrian

Kirsty Mepham (born 13 August 1969) is a British equestrian. She competed in two events at the 2000 Summer Olympics.
