= Françoise Cantamessa =

Swiss equestrian

Personal information
- Nationality: Swiss
- Born: 12 November 1968 (age 56); Zug, Switzerland

Sport
- Sport: Equestrian

Françoise Cantamessa (born 12 November 1968) is a Swiss equestrian. She competed in two events at the 2000 Summer Olympics.
