= Kennedy (horse) =

American Standardbred horse owned by the US Army

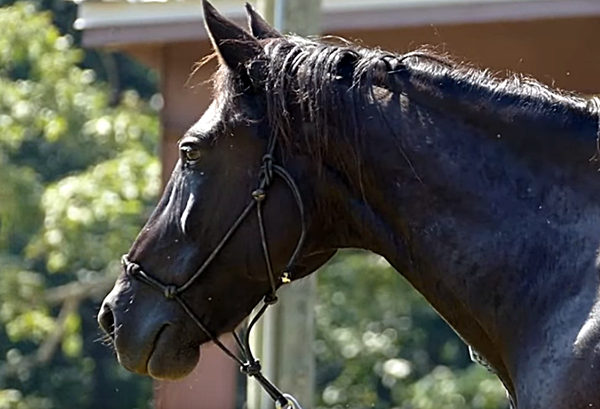
Kennedy pictured in 2016

Kennedy is an American Standardbred horse who was owned by the United States Army.

Foaled in about 2001, the gelding was posted to the Military District of Washington where he was assigned to the caisson platoon of the 3rd Infantry Regiment, serving as a caparisoned horse. Kennedy was ultimately relieved of his duties due to attitude issues and, in 2016, dismissed from military service as a result of persistent disciplinary problems. He was adopted by a former caisson platoon soldier and relocated to his ranch in Texas.
