= Debbie McDonald =

American equestrian (born 1954)

Medal record

Equestrian

Representing the United States

Olympic Games
Bronze medal – third place	2004 Athens	Team dressage

World Championships
Silver medal – second place	2002 Jerez	Team dressage
Bronze medal – third place	2006 Aachen	Team dressage

Pan American Games
Gold medal – first place	1999 Winnipeg	Team dressage
Gold medal – first place	1999 Winnipeg	Individual dressage

Debbie McDonald (born August 27, 1954) is an American dressage rider who has competed in the Olympics and many international competitions. She now lives in Hailey, Idaho, with her husband Bob, a hunter/jumper trainer. Debbie trains and teaches riders on Peggy and E. Parry Thomas's River Grove Farm in Sun Valley, Idaho.

McDonald's first mount was an $800 pony. She agreed that she would pay for board if her parents bought it for her. Shortly thereafter Debbie managed to find a gaited horse trainer near her hometown who allowed her to groom horses and clean stalls in exchange for board. At age 14, when Debbie went to turn her pony out, she discovered a strange man in his stall, beating him. She went running for help and ran into a young trainer and her future husband, Bob McDonald, who ran a hunter/jumper farm and hired her as a stable hand. It was at this facility that she began her career.

McDonald began her career in show jumping. However, she switched to dressage after a serious fall in which her horse somersaulted over her breaking ribs, rupturing her spleen, and fracturing a vertebra in her neck, She first met Parry and Peggy Thomas when she got a catch ride at a dressage show in Las Vegas on one of their horses whose rider was not available.

The Thomases also became the owners of Brentina, a chestnut Hanoverian mare that became McDonald's primary mount. McDonald and her husband obtained the mare at an auction in Germany in 1994. Brentina, foaled in 1991, had a suitable temperament to respect McDonald, who is only five feet tall, and the team established a partnership that took them to the Olympics. McDonald and Brentina began by winning the Individual and Team Gold medals at the 1999 Pan American Games. In recognition of this accomplishment, McDonald was named the 1999 Equestrian of the Year by the United States Equestrian Federation and the United States Olympic Committee (USOC) Female Equestrian Athlete of the Year. In 2003, McDonald become the first American rider to win the Dressage World Cup, and the pair placed third at the 2005 World Cup. As members of the United States Equestrian Team they won a team silver and team bronze at the 2002 and 2006 World Equestrian Games. At the 2004 Athens Olympics, the pair won the team bronze and were individually fourth overall, and McDonald was dubbed "First Lady of American Dressage."

Brentina was named the 2005 Farnam/Platform USEF Horse of the Year. After the 2008 Olympics, where the mare had an uncharacteristically poor performance, she was retired to the Thomas' farm. While McDonald went on to compete with other horses, Brentina developed an impaction in early 2009 and underwent colic surgery to remove a fecalith from her small colon. She has since recovered and attended a retirement ceremony at the 2009 FEI World Cup Dressage Finals in Las Vegas.

On January 22, 2010 McDonald was named the U.S. Equestrian Federation's Developing Dressage Coach, a role designed to identify and cultivate future US Dressage stars.
