= Ulla Salzgeber =

German equestrian

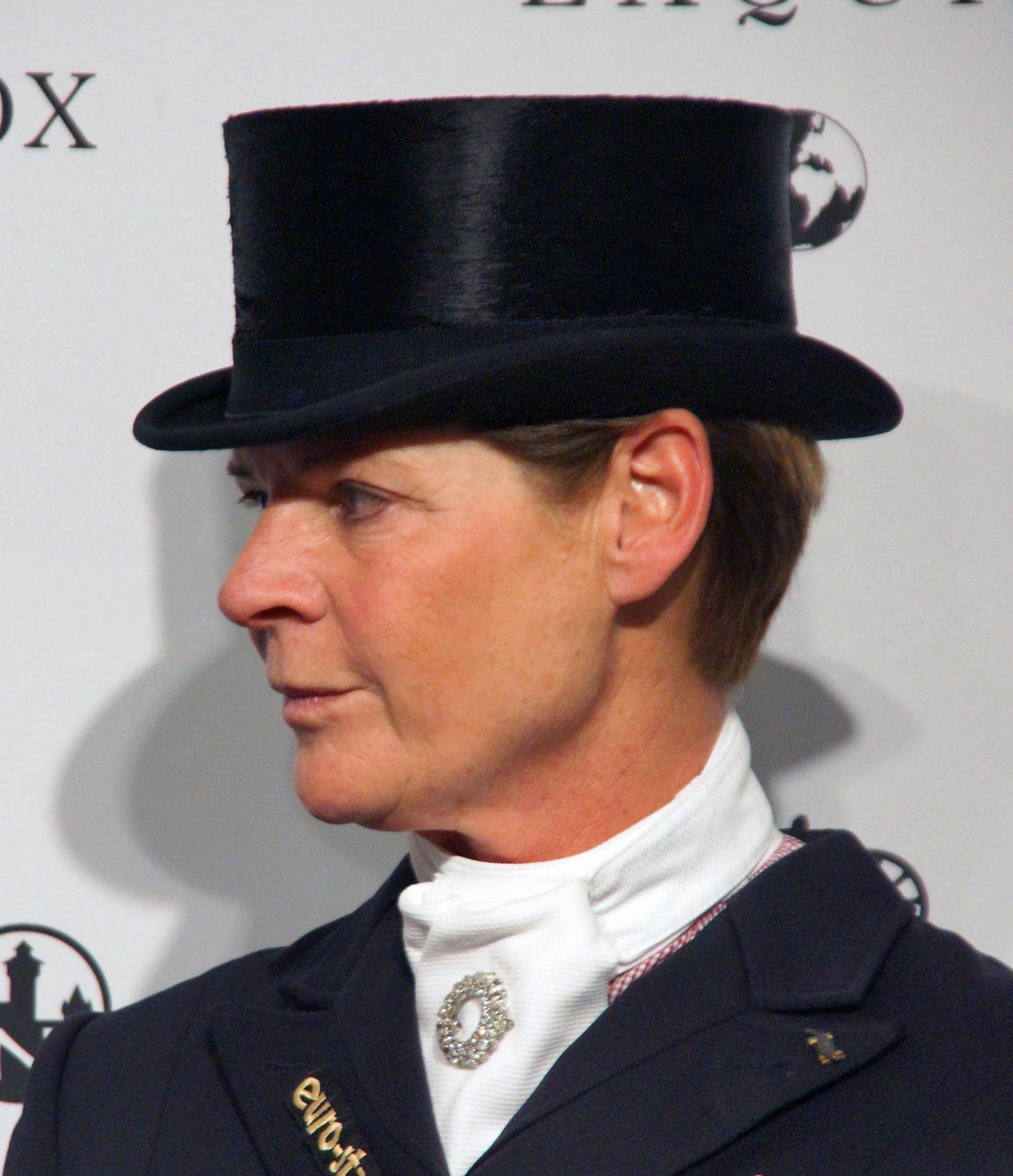

Personal information
- Nationality: German
- Born: 5 August 1958 (age 67) Oberhausen, West Germany
- Website: www.ulla-salzgeber.de

Sport
- Country: Germany
- Sport: Equestrian

Achievements and titles
- Olympic finals: 2000, 2004
Medal record
Equestrian
Representing Germany
Olympic Games
Gold medal – first place	2000 Sydney	Team dressage
Gold medal – first place	2004 Athens	Team dressage
Silver medal – second place	2004 Athens	Individual dressage
Bronze medal – third place	2000 Sydney	Individual dressage
World Championships
Gold medal – first place	1998 Rome	Team dressage
Gold medal – first place	2002 Jerez	Team dressage
Bronze medal – third place	1998 Rome	Individual dressage
Bronze medal – third place	2002 Jerez	Individual dressage
European Championships
Gold medal – first place	1997 Verden	Team dressage
Gold medal – first place	1999 Arnhem	Team dressage
Gold medal – first place	2001 Verden	Team dressage
Gold medal – first place	2001 Verden	Individual dressage
Gold medal – first place	2003 Hickstead	Team dressage
Gold medal – first place	2003 Hickstead	Individual dressage
Silver medal – second place	1999 Arnhem	Individual dressage
World Cup
Gold medal – first place	2001 Aarhus	Individual dressage
Gold medal – first place	2002 Den Bosch	Individual dressage
Bronze medal – third place	2011 Leipzig	Individual dressage

Ulla Salzgeber (born 5 August 1958 in Oberhausen) is a German equestrian and Olympic champion who competes in the sport of dressage. Competing in the 2000 and 2004 Summer Olympics, she won two team gold medals, one individual silver and one individual bronze. She also won numerous medals at the World Equestrian Games, Dressage World Cup and European Dressage Championships. After the retirement of her Olympic horse, Rusty, after the 2004 Games, and unexpected death of her second international-level mount in 2005, Salzgeber struggled to find a new Grand Prix-level horse.

In 2005, she took time from competition to act as the dressage training adviser to the Australian national equestrian team, but resigned from that position in late 2006. In 2008, she began riding Herzruf's Erbe at major events, but the horse has been plagued by injuries that have required him to miss many competitions. Salzgeber announced a change in her training base in July 2016, moving to new stables in Ettringen, Bavaria. In 2013, after returning Herzruf's Erbe to competition, Salzgeber was again named to the German equestrian squad's A-team.

== Personal life ==
Born 5 August 1958 in Oberhausen as Ulla Helbing, Salzgeber began riding at age 10, competing in the sport of vaulting. In 1977, at age 19, she was the Young Riders European Championships. She attended college, graduating from law school before building a training stable in Bad Wörishofen, Germany, that focuses on dressage. Salzgeber is married to Sebastian Salzgeber, and has one daughter, Kim.

== Career ==
Salzgeber rode the same horse to all of her Olympic, World Equestrian Games and European Championship medals. Rusty 47, nicknamed Rusty, was a Latvian warmblood gelding who was named Rotors when he was purchased by Salzgeber from a German show jumping barn. The pair came to international attention at the 1997 European Championships, with a sixth place individual finish and a team gold. They repeated team gold at the 1998 World Equestrian Games, while also taking a bronze medal in individual competition. The German team, with Salzgeber, rode to another team gold at the 1999 European Championships, and Salzgeber and Rusty also took individual silver. After Gigolo, a horse ridden by Isabell Werth, was retired in 2000, Salzgeber and Rusty became the top dressage pair in Germany. At the 2000 Summer Olympics, she won the bronze medal in the individual dressage competition. She also rode as part of the gold-medal winning German team, but as the lowest-scoring member, her score was not used to determine the team's standing. During the finals, in her musical kur performance, Salzgeber's selected music stopped playing, but she continued riding and finished the event. The music to which the pair performed, Carmina Burana, was used by Salzgeber and Rusty in all their competitions and became "tightly linked to the horse with its signature pirouettes and to date still best one-tempi changes ever."

The 2001 and 2003 European Championships brought four gold medals in team and individual competition, while the 2001 and 2002 Dressage World Cup competitions brought two additional golds. The 2002 World Equestrian Games brought a repeat of 1998, with team gold and individual bronze medals. In 2003, however, Salzgeber became mired in doping charges after Rusty tested positive for testosterone propionate at the 2003 World Cup finals, losing what would have been a third successive gold. Rusty's veterinarian claimed the drug was given to him to treat a hormonal imbalance, but the pair was banned from competition for two months by the German Equestrian Federation. An exception was made for the 2004 German Dressage Championships, which allowed them to qualify for the 2004 Olympic Games. She was not allowed to compete in qualifying events for the 2004 World Cup, and she did not ride in the event. At the 2004 Summer Olympics, she improved her individual performance to win a silver medal, and rode with the German team to a second successive gold in the team competition. Rusty was retired soon after the 2004 Olympics, and was euthanized in 2013 at the age of 25. Months before his death, it was announced that Rusty had been cloned, resulting in two young stallions, nicknamed "Rusty Clone 1" and "Rusty Clone 2".

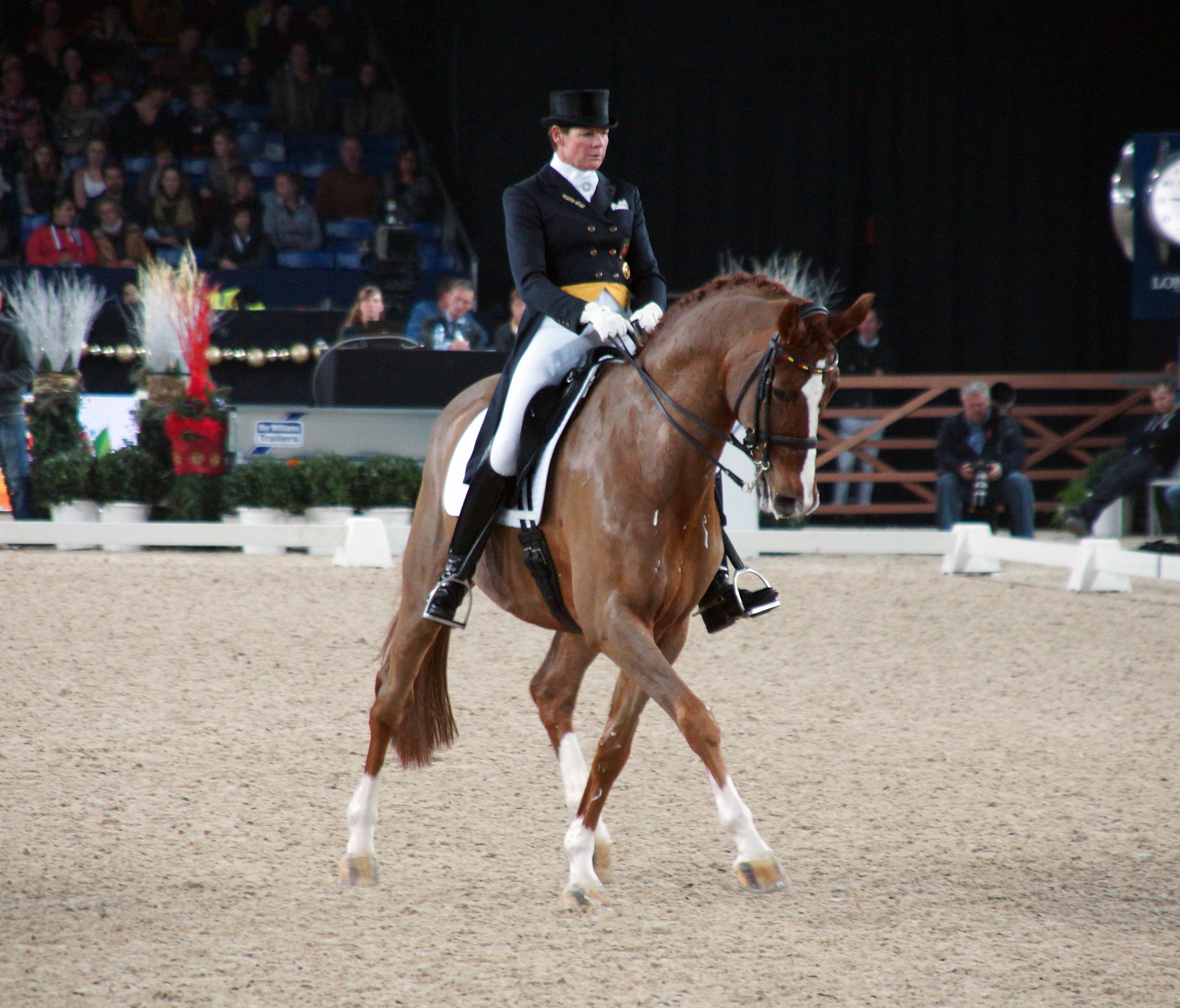
Salzgeber and Herzruf's Erbe in 2013

In mid-2005, Salzgeber's then-current Grand Prix mount, Wall Street, was euthanized following an episode of colic. This, combined with the recent retirement of Rusty, left her with no Grand Prix-level horses. Wall Street, while a relatively successful dressage horse, had suffered health problems and had never been able to compete with Rusty as Salzgeber's top horse. In 2008, Salzgeber again began competing at the Grand Prix level on Herzruf's Erbe, who would develop into one of her top international horses. In that year, the pair won the Otto Lorke Prize, given each year to the best German Grand Prix horse under 10 years old. During 2008, Salzgeber and Herzruf's Erbe had won 10 Grand Prix competitions. In 2009, the pair were expected to compete at the European Dressage Championships, but were not chosen for the German team after Herzruf's Erbe sustained an injury at a competition in July. The immediate diagnosis was a severely pulled tendon, although a later diagnosis was that the horse had strained a suspensory muscle, expected to heal in about three months. By early 2010, the horse was again able to be ridden, but was still not in top condition.

In June 2011, Salzgeber announced that she would be selling one of her top-level horses, Wakana, to a student, leaving Herzruf's Erbe as her only horse prepared to compete at the international level. Later that month, Salzgeber removed herself from consideration for competition at the 2011 CHIO Aachen and European Dressage Championships. She announced that she had decided to take a break from competition and focus more on training and her personal life. In 2012, she announced that she would not be seeking a spot on the German team for the 2012 Summer Olympics, saying that her training duties had not given her time to properly prepare Herzruf's Erbe. She had ridden the horse at competitions during the 2011-2012 winter, and stated that she planned to compete at additional competitions during the winter of 2012-2013. However, in late 2012, the horse was put into a one-year rest period to help him recover from the injuries that had troubled him throughout his career. In October 2013, Salzgeber brought Herzruf's Erbe back into competition, winning a national show in Germany. The pair was successful at subsequent competitions, and in December 2013, it was announced that they had been returned to the German equestrian squad's A-team.

=== Coaching and training ===
In 2005, Salzgeber was named as the new dressage training adviser to the Australian national equestrian team. In the role, Salzgeber held training camps, approved team members' training programs and helped choose team members for international competitions. In late 2006, she resigned, citing a mix of training duties at home in Europe and disagreements with the Equestrian Federation of Australia. Under her tenure, however, the Australian team made their best-ever placing at the 2006 World Equestrian Games, finishing 9th.

In early 2010, Salzgeber announced that she would be moving her base of training from the stables in Bad Wörishofen where she had been located since she graduated from college. The new facilities, nearby in Blonhofen, Bavaria, offered more room and extensive natural therapy facilities, including aquatherapy, acupuncture, osteopathy, and homeopathics. Salzgeber said the new, larger, base would allow her to give more training clinics and accept more students.
