= Beatriz Ferrer-Salat =

Spanish equestrian

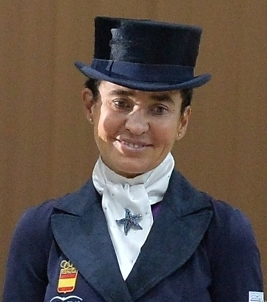
- Beatriz Ferrer-Salat (2016)

Medal record

Equestrian

Representing Spain

Olympic Games
Silver medal – second place	2004 Athens	Team dressage
Bronze medal – third place	2004 Athens	Individual dressage

World Championships
Silver medal – second place	2002 Jerez	Individual dressage
Bronze medal – third place	2002 Jerez	Team dressage

European Championships
Silver medal – second place	2003 Hickstead	Team dressage
Bronze medal – third place	2003 Hickstead	Individual dressage
Bronze medal – third place	2005 Hagen	Team dressage
Bronze medal – third place	2015 Aachen	Freestyle dressage

Beatriz Ferrer-Salat Serra de Migui (born March 11, 1966) is an equestrian from Spain who competes internationally in the sport of dressage. She won two Olympic medals, a silver and a bronze, at the 2004 Games, and also competed at the 1996 Summer Olympics, 2000 Summer Olympics, 2016 Summer Olympics and 2020 Summer Olympics. She began riding in international competitions in 1995, and has since competed in the 2002 World Equestrian Games, winning individual silver and team bronze, and in several European Dressage Championships, where she has won several additional individual and team medals. Based in Spain, Ferrer-Salat continues to compete internationally, as well as acting as the chair of the board for the Spanish Dressage Riders Club.

== Early life ==
Ferrer-Salat was born March 11, 1966, in Barcelona, Spain. She is the daughter of Carlos Ferrer, a tennis player who played for Spain in the Davis Cup in 1953, and in 1986 was president of the Spanish Olympic Committee during Barcelona's selection as the host city for the 1992 Summer Olympics. At age 15, she began riding, and soon began training seriously in dressage. The 1986 selection of Barcelona to host the 1992 Summer Games inspired her to become a professional in the sport. Ferrer-Salat moved to Germany in 1990 to train with several coaches.

== Competitive career ==
At the 1995 European Championships, Ferrer-Salat, riding Vital Robert Worislaw, helped the Spanish team to a sixth-place finish. This qualified the Spanish dressage team for an Olympic berth for the first time in history. At the 1996 Summer Olympics, riding Vital Robert Brilliant, she came in 32nd individually and the Spanish team finished in seventh place. In 1997, Ferrer-Salat moved back to Spain after the death of her trainer, and took Jan Bemelmans, the Spanish team trainer, as her coach. At this point, she began riding Beauvalais, with whom she became a top rider at the international level. At the 2002 World Equestrian Games, the pair took silver individually and helped the Spanish team to win a bronze, and at the European Championships in 2003 took an individual bronze and team silver. At the 2005 European Championships, Ferrer-Salat again assisted the Spanish team to win a bronze. At the 2000 Games, riding Beauvalais, her placings improved substantially, and she came in tenth individually, with the Spanish team finishing in fifth place. Both individual and team performance continued to improve, and at the 2004 Summer Olympics, again riding Beauvalais, Ferrer-Salat earned a bronze medal in the individual competition, and helped the Spanish team to win a silver. She missed the 2006 World Equestrian Games due to an injury suffered by Beauvalias.

In 2007, Beauvalais was retired, and Ferrer-Salat began competing internationally with two new horses, Fabergé and Peter Pan. In the run-up to the 2008 Summer Olympics, she was on the short-list for the Spanish team, but had to withdraw after Fabergé was injured and Peter Pan was evaluated as too inexperienced to compete. This withdrawal left Spain with only two riders, removing the country from the team competition. In 2009, she began competing with Delgado, who quickly became her top horse. Continuing the plague of injuries, she was scheduled to compete in the 2012 Summer Olympics, but was forced to withdraw after Delgado suffered an injury to his hoof. The horse, although capable of producing high scores, was prone to injury, and also caused Ferrer-Salat to withdraw from the 2010 World Equestrian Games and the 2011 European Championships. Despite these setbacks, she is known as the "most successful dressage rider" in Spanish history. She currently is working with at least two new horses, Edgar Wallace and Sir Radjah, who she introduced to international competition in early 2013.

Ferrer-Salat trains with Ton de Ridder, a Dutchman based in Germany, who has been her coach since February 2010, and bases her activities from her barn in Gualba, Spain. In 2013, Ferrer-Salat was announced as the chair of the board of the newly created Spanish Dressage Riders Club, a national organization for dressage in Spain.
