= Lone Castrup Jørgensen =

Danish equestrian

Personal information
- Nationality: Danish, Australian
- Born: 23 April 1962 (age 64) Copenhagen, Denmark

Sport
- Sport: Equestrian
Medal record
Equestrian
Representing Denmark
European Championships
| Bronze medal – third place | 1999 Arnhem | Team dressage |
| Bronze medal – third place | 2001 Verden | Team dressage |

Lone Castrup Jørgensen (born 23 April 1962) is a Danish-born equestrian, who has been representing Australia since 2019. She competed at the 2000 Summer Olympics and the 2004 Summer Olympics.
