= Jon Pedersen =

Danish equestrian (born 1957)

Personal information
- Nationality: Danish
- Born: Jon Dalgaard Pedersen; 18 June 1957 (age 69) Silkeborg, Denmark

Sport
- Sport: Equestrian
Medal record
Equestrian
Representing Denmark
European Championships
Bronze medal – third place	1999 Arnhem	Team dressage
Bronze medal – third place	2001 Verden	Team dressage

Jon Dalgaard Pedersen (born 18 June 1957) is a Danish equestrian. He competed at the 2000 Summer Olympics and the 2004 Summer Olympics.

In a documentary from 1997 Jon Pedersen was caught abusing horses. For instance by hitting a horse in the eye with the hard end of a whip, then continuing to hit the horse with the hard end of the whip 5-6 more times, then whipping the horse for another 30 minutes. In a documentary from 2026, he was again caught on tape abusing horses while employed at Dalumgaard Rideklub (riding club).
