= Mary Hanna =

Australian equestrian

Personal information
- Nationality: Australian
- Born: 1 December 1954 (age 71) Melbourne, Australia
- Height: 173 cm (68 in) (2012)
- Weight: 63 kg (139 lb) (2012)

Sport
- Country: Australia
- Sport: Equestrian
- Event: Dressage
- College team: Dressage Geelong

Mary Hanna (née Sutherland) (born 1 December 1954) is an Australian equestrian. She has represented Australia at six Olympic Games in the equestrian discipline of dressage (Atlanta 1996 with Mosaic, Sydney 2000 and Athens 2004 with Limbo, London 2012 with Sancette, Rio 2016 with Boogie Woogie and Tokyo 2020 with Calanta).

== Personal ==
Hanna was born on 1 December 1954 in Melbourne, Australia. She attended Macarthur State School in Victoria before going to high school at Presbyterian Ladies' College. She has a Bachelor of Arts degree. Her husband is Rob Hanna, Equestrian Australia chef d'equipe.

== Equestrian ==
Hanna is an equestrian dressage competitor. She has been coached by Kyra Kyrklund and Clemens Dierks. Currently she is coached by Patrik Kittel. Her primary training base is in Gisborne, Victoria, Australia.

Hanna competed at the 1996, 2000, 2004, 2012 Summer Olympics, 2016 Summer Olympics and 2020 Summer Olympics. In 1996, she finished twenty-fourth in the individual event. In 2000, she finished thirty-fourth in the individual event and sixth in the team event. In 2004, she finished thirty-ninth in the individual event. In 2012, she finished forty-third in the individual event and ninth in the team event. She was the last Australian competitor to qualify for the 2012 Summer Olympics. She was the oldest Australian equestrian competitor at the Games. She rode Sancette.

Hanna finished 3rd at the 2011 CDI3 Grand Prix held in Biarritz, France. She finished 7th at the 2012 CDI3 Grand Prix held in Compiegne, France. She finished 12th at the 2012 CDI4 Grand Prix held in Hamburg, Germany. She finished 19th at the 2012 CDI3 Grand Prix held in Mannheim, Germany. She finished 7th at the 2012 CDI3 Grand Prix held in Viduaban, France.

She has qualified for the 2014 FEI World Cup Dressage Final in Lyon, France, where she finished 15th. At the 2014 World Equestrian Games held in Normandy, Hanna finished 10th in team dressage and 29th in individual dressage.

In 2016, Hanna qualified once again for the World Cup finals in Gothenburg, Sweden, where she finished 15th. Later that year she competed at the 2016 Summer Olympics held in Rio de Janeiro, Brazil. She placed 9th in the team and 39th in the individual dressage competitions. At age of 61, she became the oldest Australian athlete ever to compete at the Olympics, surpassing a fellow equestrian and multiple medalist Bill Roycroft.
