= Susan Blinks =

American equestrian

Personal information
- Born: October 5, 1957 (age 68) Washington, D.C.
Medal record
Equestrian
Representing the United States
Olympic Games
Bronze medal – third place	2000 Sydney	Team dressage
World Championships
Silver medal – second place	2002 Jerez	Team dressage

Susan M. "Sue" Blinks (born October 5, 1957) is an American dressage rider and trainer. She was best known for riding her Olympic Grand Prix mount Flim Flam. Having represented the United States in an Olympics and two World Equestrian Games, she helped the US Team earn an Olympic bronze medal in Sydney, Australia and competed in the 1998 and 2002 World Equestrian Games.

Blinks spent her teens training with Marianne Ludwig. She worked as Equestrian Director at the University of Massachusetts and later trained with Walter Christenson in Germany. She also trained with Isabell Werth and Uwe Schulten-Baumer in Germany.

Until 2016, Sue resided in San Diego, CA, riding for Leatherdale Farm. She has since relocated to Florida, where she continues riding and training.
