= Glossary of carriage and driving terminology =

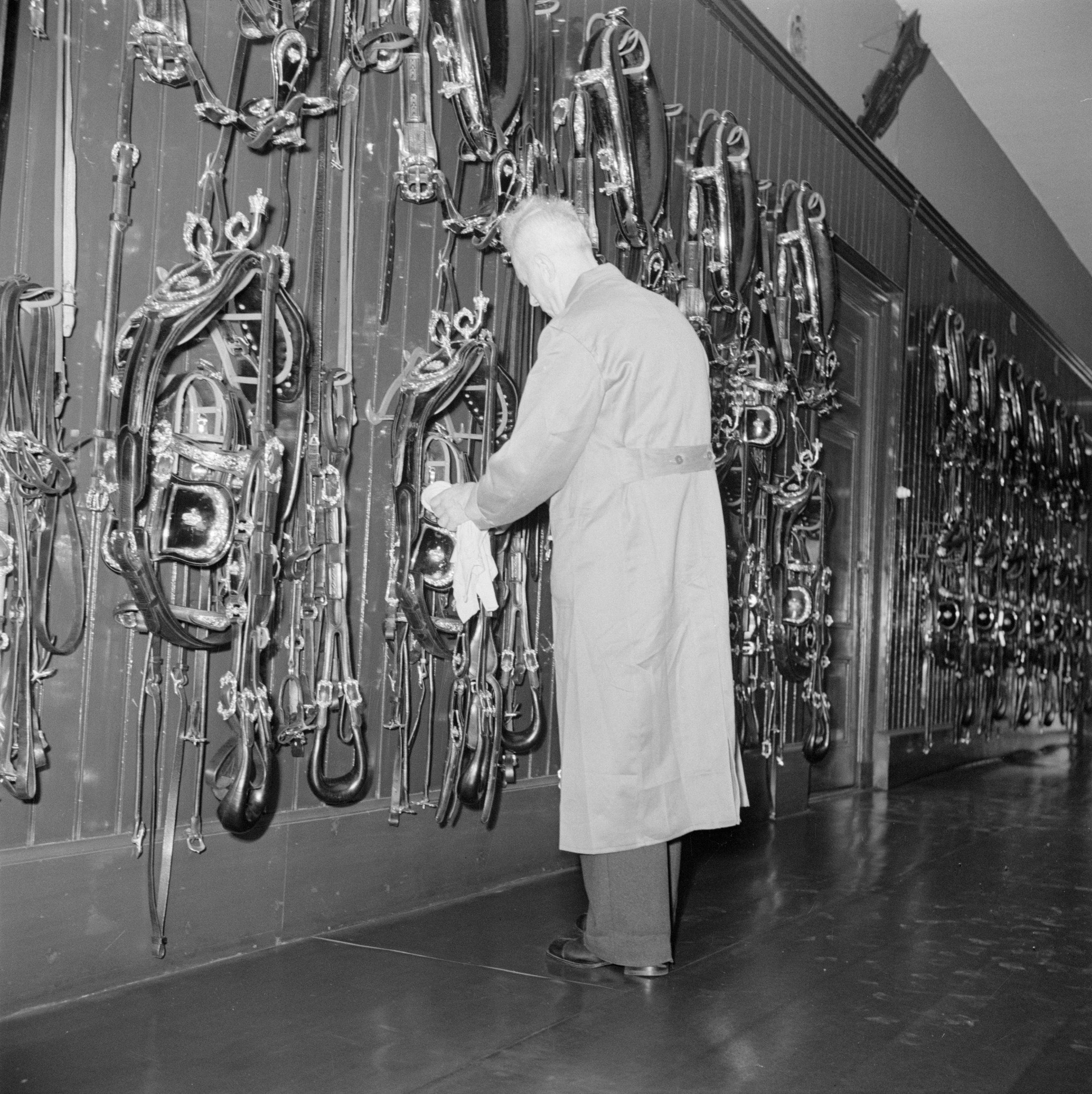
Harness room at the Royal Stables in the Netherlands, 1948

This glossary of carriage and driving terminology provides definitions of historical and contemporary terms used in the design, construction, operation, and cultural use of carriages and related horse-drawn vehicles. It includes vocabulary associated with vehicle types, carriage parts, driving techniques, occupations, harnesses, and equipment used in traditional and modern horse driving practices.

For French carriage terminology used in English-language texts, see the section French-to-English terminology below.

== A ==
à la Daumont
A carriage or coach that was arranged without a driver's seat and intended for guidance by postilion, had à la Daumont appended, such as "coach à la Daumont". Daumont is a corruption of the French d'Aumont from the 8th Duke of Aumont who preferred this manner of travel.
amateur
Refers to those who took up driving horse-drawn vehicles ordinarily driven by professional coachmen. Usually refers to those of the wealthy classes. It became a popular sport in England, France and the United States where exclusive driving clubs were formed.
apron
A drape worn by a carriage driver and tied around the waist, or attached to the vehicle. The purpose is to keep the driver warm and dry, and keep the reins, leather grease, and other dirt off the driver's clothes. Compare lap robe.
axle tree
Original name for an axle.

== B ==
back strap
A strap running from the crupper to the saddle. It also holds the breeching support straps in position, or trace hangers in lieu of breeching.
bearing rein
An optional piece of harness to prevent a horse from lowering its head beyond a certain point. A bearing rein runs from the harness saddle, splits and runs on each side of the neck, then through metal loops on the bridle beside its ears, then down the side of the face to connect to the bit. Bearing reins are fairly common in modern carriage driving styles. Compare overcheck.
bit
Metal in the horse's mouth to control or steer a horse. See driving bit.
boot
A wooden box on a carriage or coach. It might be under a seat or in the front or rear. Shape and location depend on the carriage style.
bow
Strip of bent wood. Three or more are used to support a carriage or wagon top. Originally called "hoop stick". See also hoop.
box seat, box
The "box seat" is a raised and forward seat structure for a coachman plus one passenger to sit on when driving a carriage or coach. The "box" is the seat designated for the driver, usually on the right, and is often slightly raised or angled so the driver is more upright than a sitting position.
break, brake
Originally a heavy, bodiless carriage frame used for training and breaking horses to harness; later applied to various large, open passenger vehicles built along similar lines.
breast collar, breastcollar
A padded strap running across the front of the horse's chest in lieu of a full collar. Breast collars do not require close fitting for each horse. They should be used with a swingletree at the carriage to avoid rubbing the horse's shoulders during movement
breeching
Part of a harness with the purpose of keeping a wheeled-vehicle from bumping the rear of the horse. The purpose is so the horse can slow or stop a vehicle, and to "hold back" a vehicle on a downward slope. May also be pronounced britchin.

== C ==
carriage
A two-wheeled or four-wheeled vehicle drawn by horses, and used for carrying people.
carriage dog, coach dog
A Dalmatian dog was traditionally used to accompany a under a coach, running under the carriage between the wheels and guard parcels.
carriage house (USA), coach house (UK)
A building used to keep carriages and harness.
carriagemaker
A builder of complete passenger carriages, combining multiple trades to produce the finished vehicle.
carriage trade
1. Equivalent to "carriage industry" during the horse-drawn era, encompassing the trades of coachbuilders, wheelwrights, painters, trimmers, blacksmiths, suppliers, and other integral specialties.
2. (slang) Affluent clientele; a holdover from the time when only the wealthy had their own carriages.
cart
A two-wheeled vehicle pulled by one or more horses.
carter
A person whose occupation is driving or managing a cart for heavy haulage, usually with a horse or team of horses in tandem. In some forms of carting, the carter walked beside the wheel horse rather than riding in the cart.
carting
The transport of heavy loads by cart, especially goods such as coal. In some forms of carting, tandem teams were used, with the carter standing beside the wheel horse and controlling the horses with the reins or a jerk line..
cee-spring, c-spring
A metal spring for carriage suspension shaped like the letter "C".
chariot
1. A cut-down coach, a four-wheeled vehicle seating two passengers facing forward. Pulled by a pair of horses, driven from a front driver's seat with a hammercloth, and with two footmen on a rear dummy board. See Chariot (carriage).
2. (antiquity) A fast and light open two-wheeled vehicle drawn by two or more horses hitched side by side; no seats, the driver and passengers remain standing. An early form of horse-drawn vehicle, developed in antiquity. Today seen in reenactments and some niche racing. See Chariot.
coach
An enclosed carriage, usually drawn by two or more horses.
coachbuilder
A craftsperson or firm that designs and constructs carriage bodies, including the woodwork, metalwork, and finish.
coach horse, coacher
A strong horse, heavier than a riding horse and lighter than a heavy draft horse, bred for drawing coaches, sometimes stylish.
coach house
See carriage house.
coaching
The sport or practice of driving a four-horse coach for pleasure or competition, using traditional vehicles, harness, and turnout styles derived from 18th-19th-century road coaching. Modern coaching emphasizes skilled handling of a four-in-hand of horses, correct presentation, and adherence to historical standards.
coachman
A professional driver responsible for operating a carriage or coach, and driving the horses.
cockhorse, cock horse
An extra horse used to assist a team in pulling a heavy load up a hill. The cockhorse was outfitted in a harness and a riding saddle, and was always ridden when put to service. Its traces were run to a bar, and thence a rope ran between the leaders of the team and attached to the front of the pole to help pull the load.
collar, horse collar, full collar
A large padded loop fitted closely around the horse's neck and resting on its shoulders. Must be correctly sized for each individual horse. Used for heavier pulling than a breast collar.
combined driving
A driving competition that goes up to the international level. Individual events are offered for single horses, pairs, and teams. The competition incorporates three phases: dressage, cross-country marathon, and obstacle cone driving.
crupper
A padded strap fitted high under the horse's tail with straps running along the back to the saddle. It helps keep the harness saddle from slipping forward.

== D ==
dashboard, dash-board, dash
An upright board or panel at the front of a carriage to block dirt flung up from the horse's hooves; made of wood or leather on an iron frame. See also Dashboard § Etymology.
dickey, dickey seat
A seat for a coachman constructed in front of a carriage or coach body. Formerly, the servant's seat behind the body.
draft horse (US), draught horse (UK)
Type of large muscular horse developed as heavy-pulling work horses.
driving
Guiding and controlling one or more horses from behind, such as from a wheeled vehicle, agricultural implement, or when pulling logs, boats or other loads. Guidance is by long reins and voice, often using traditional or regional voice commands.

== E ==
elliptic spring
A metal leaf spring used as support and suspension in carriages, coaches, carts, and wagons.
equipage
A term used to indicate the entirety of horses, vehicle, attendants, and other accoutrements all together. Usually used for aristocratic or royal retinues. Contemporarily, and more commonly, called a turnout.

== F ==
false martingale
A strap in harness passing from the collar, through the horse's legs to the belly band, to hold the collar down into position.
fender
See splashboard.
fifth wheel
A single or pair of metal discs laying horizontal, located between the body of a four-wheeled vehicle and the front axle, through which the king bolt runs and allows the front axle to turn.
footboard
Angled piece for the driver's feet; some vehicles may not have a dashboard attached to it. Earlier, the footboard was a platform for the rear attendants to stand on.
footman
A liveried servant who attended a carriage, often riding on a rear seat (rumble) or platform. Duties included assisting passengers, opening doors, and managing safety in traffic.
four-in-hand
A team of four horses.

== G ==
groom
A person, often liveried, responsible for caring for horses, assisting the driver, and managing harnessing and turnout. In contemporary sport driving, a person or persons accompanying the driver whose primary purpose is to handle the horses; usually one groom for a pair and two grooms for a team of four.
ground driving
Driving a horse while walking behind or to the side of it. Also called long-reining, long-lining, and line driving.

== H ==
hammercloth
A decorative cloth covering the box seat on a carriage or coach, often richly fringed or embroidered.
hames
A pair of rigid metal or wooden pieces that lay in the groove of collar and provide attachment points for the traces. They take the full force of the horse's pull which is spread across the entire padded collar.
hame-plate
A hame-plate is a decorative item, usually brass, which attaches to the hame strap.
hame strap
A strap used to fasten the tops of the hames together over the collar.
harness

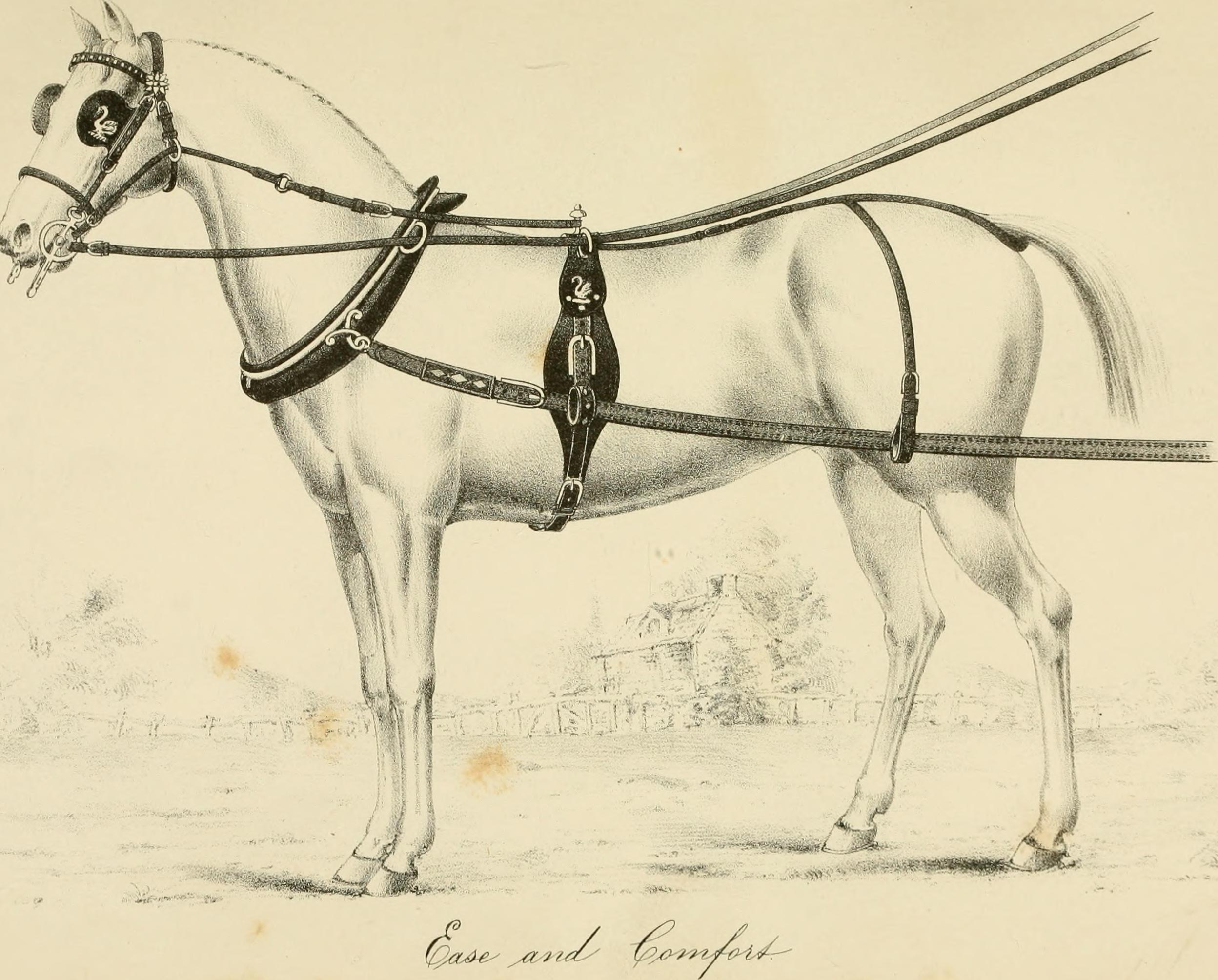
Harness

1. Straps, padding, and hardware placed on a horse in order to hitch it to a vehicle or load.
2. To harness a horse is to put the harness on the horse.
hitch
1. To attach a horse or horses, already harnessed, to a vehicle. Mainly US; compare putting to (UK).
2. A hitch is US term for a turnout.
hoop
1. Arched supporting ribs (usually bent wood) forming the framework for a canvas cover over a wagon or carriage. May be mounted upright or sloping. Also called a bow.
2. A regional term for an iron tyre of a wheel.
horsecar
A horse-drawn rail vehicle operating on fixed tracks, used for urban passenger transport.
horse-drawn
Describes any vehicle or implement pulled by horses, including passenger carriages, wagons, carts, rail cars, boats, farm equipment, and sleighs. See also Horse-drawn vehicle.
horse logging
See Horse logging.
hub
See nave.

== I ==
imperial
A light luggage rack or platform mounted on the roof of a coach, used for carrying baggage.

== J ==
jerk line
A single line when driving multiple freight horses. The jerk line runs past all the horses to the lead horse's left bit ring. A single pull means to turn left; a series of light jerks means to turn right. In some cases, each [left] horse in line has its own jerk line.

== K ==
kicking strap
For a single horse in shafts, a strap running over the horse's croup and attaching to the shafts on each side. When the horse attempts to kick or lift its hindquarters, the strap tightens and lifts the shafts, preventing the horse from getting a leg over the shafts or traces. It also limits upward movement of the quarters because of the weight of the shafts, discouraging kicking or bucking and reducing the risk of a wreck. Usually only used for horses inclined to kick or buck in harness.
king bolt, king pin, perch bolt
The bolt which runs through the fifth wheel in the front axle assembly, and which is the pivot point for the front axle in a four-wheeled vehicle.

== L ==
lamp
A carriage lantern to illuminate the road at night. Early lamps were oil-burning, but candles were cleaner and easier to handle, and so became the norm. They were commonly made of brass or a white metal, glass panes, and a reflective surface behind the candle.
lap robe, lap rug, lap blanket
A blanket or covering used by carriage passengers to protect the legs and feet from cold, wind, or dirt. Should reach from the waist to the floor. Compare apron.
leader
Each horse in the front pair of horses in a driving team, positioned ahead of the pole or shafts. Leaders pull the vehicle via their traces but cannot slow or hold it back; that function belongs to the wheelers.
livery
Distinctive clothing worn by coachmen, footmen, grooms or other servants, often in the colors of the household they served.
livery stable
A commercial stable that boarded horses, rented horses and vehicles, and provided services such as feeding, grooming, and harnessing.

== M ==
mews
A row or courtyard of stables or coach houses, usually with living quarters for staff.

== N ==
nave
The central hub of a wooden wheel into which the spokes are fitted.
nose bag
A small feed bag placed over a horse's muzzle so it can eat grain while standing harnessed or tied.

== O ==
omnibus
A large vehicle for multiple passengers.
outrider
A mounted attendant who rode alongside or ahead of a carriage or coach to clear the way, provide security, or assist in emergencies.
overcheck
An optional piece of harness to prevent a horse from lowering its head beyond a fixed point and usually to keep the head raised higher than natural. An overcheck runs from the harness saddle, passes over the horse's head between its ears, down the front of the face, and connects to the bit. Overchecks are common in harness racing, and for certain driving classes at American breed shows. Compare bearing rein.

== P ==
pair
Two horses harnessed side-by-side as a unit. A pair may pull a vehicle alone or form part of a larger team. Compare team.
panel
The flat or curved pieces which fill the framing of the body between pillars. Panels can include the door, side panels, quarter panels, and back panels.
perch
The central longitudinal beam connecting the front and rear axles of a four-wheeled carriage, forming part of the undercarriage structure. Also called a reach.
peirameter
A device used by coachbuilders to evaluate forces needed to move various horse-drawn vehicles over different surfaces.
pick axe
A driving arrangement with three horses in front of two horses.
pillar
An upright structural member of a coach body which supports the roof, doors, or panels. Compare standard.
pole
A single rigid bar extending from the front of a horse-drawn vehicle, positioned between a pair of horses, and harnessed to them. Allows the horses to steer and slow the vehicle; pulling is done through the traces. Compare shafts.
pole cap
Metal fitting at the front end of a pole to which harness chains or straps are connected.
porte-cochère
A covered entrance on a building, large enough for a carriage to pass, and allowing passengers to alight under shelter. Originally, porte-cochère was a term for a large doorway/passageway into a court, but has become the term for a projecting canopy structure.
postboy
See postilion.
postilion
A rider who mounted one of the horses in a pair or team, and guided the carriage from horseback rather than from a box seat. Common on royal or ceremonial coaches and on early long distance posting routes. Sometimes called a postboy.
posting
A form of long-distance travel in which a traveler hired fresh horses and a post-boy from post-houses along the road. Posting was more expensive than stagecoach travel but offered privacy, since the traveler rode in a hired post-chaise or in their own carriage while only the horses and post-boys were supplied by the post-house.
putting to
Attaching a horse or horses, already harnessed, to a vehicle. Mainly UK; compare hitch (US).

== Q ==
quarter panel
A side panel of a carriage body, typically between the door and the corner pillar.

== R ==
randem
A driving arrangement with three horses in single file: leader in front, wheeler in back, and a horse between them. Compare tandem.
reach
Same as a perch.
rein rail
A rail or bar on the dashboard used to rest the reins or organize them when the vehicle is stopped.
rumble
A seat behind the main body of the carriage for a guard, groom or footman.

== S ==
saddle
The part of a driving harness that sits on the horse's back, supporting the shafts through the tugs and providing attachment points for other harness components.
shafts
A pair of rigid bars extending from the front of a horse-drawn vehicle, one on each side of a single horse. Shafts allow the horse to steer and slow a vehicle. In a two-wheeled vehicle, shafts hold the vehicle level. Used for a single horse, for the rearmost horse in a tandem, or occasionally as side-poles in a troika). Compare pole.
sleigh
A horse‑drawn vehicle mounted on runners instead of wheels, used on snow or ice.
splashboard
1. Guards built onto the sides of a vehicle to protect passengers from water and mud, constructed of wood or an iron frame covered by leather. Called a fender in the US.
2. A dashboard on a sleigh is sometimes called a splashboard.

See also Dashboard § Etymology.

splinter bar
A crossbar at the front of a carriage's undercarriage to which the traces are attached.
stagecoach
A large horse-drawn public transport coach, typically pulled by four or more horses and changed for fresh teams at regular "stages" along the route.
standard
1. Generally, any upright post or vertical support in vehicle construction used to hold a seat, rail, roof, or other structural element in position.
2. An upright member holding a canopy top such as on a surrey.
state chariot
An elaborately decorated ceremonial chariot-style vehicle, often with a glass front panel or windscreen. Used for formal occasions and also called a gala chariot or dress chariot.
state coach, state carriage
A highly ornate ceremonial coach used by a monarch or head of state, drawn at a walk by multiple matched horses, and driven by postilions (riders) or a coachman (driver). The term may also refer to a formal town coach used by nobility for important occasions.
sulky
A very lightweight two-wheeled cart for one person and pulled by a single horse. Now primarily associated with harness racing and built with extremely light materials.

== T ==
Tally-Ho
1. Name used on several fast stagecoach services between London and Birmingham, England in the 1800s.
2. Name of an 1875 coach owned and driven by DeLancey Astor Kane and now in a New York carriage museum.
3. Colloquial term for "a fast coach".
tandem
A harness arrangement with two or more horses in single file, the rearmost horse (the wheeler) working in shafts.
team
1. (US) A pair of horses hitched abreast to a vehicle.
2. (UK) Four horses hitched to a vehicle in two pairs; leaders in front and wheelers behind. Also called a four-in-hand.
teamster
An older term for a person who drove a team of horses, especially for freight or heavy hauling.
thoroughbraces, braces
Heavy leather straps or stays used for suspension or structural support either in place of, or in addition to, steel spring suspension systems.
tilt
1. A tent-like covering for a wagon or carriage. May refer to the canvas itself or, by extension, the complete covered structure including its supporting hoops.
2. Sometimes used as a synonym for the supports, hoops.
traces
The two straps or chains which take the pull from the breast collar or hames to the vehicle or load.
troika
A traditional Russian driving arrangement of three horses abreast pulling a sleigh or wheeled vehicle. The center horse is between shafts, and the outboard horses are to each side with their heads turned further outward.
turnout
A general term for the complete presentation of horses, vehicle, harness, and equipment; essentially the same as an equipage.

== U ==
undercarriage
The structural framework beneath a carriage body, including axles, springs, perch, and running gear.
unicorn
A driving arrangement with three horses: a pair behind and a single leader in front.

== V ==
vehicle
Any two- or four-wheeled vehicle or sled-runner vehicle pulled by a horse. See horse-drawn vehicle.

== W ==
wagon, waggon (UK)
A four-wheeled vehicle pulled by one or more horses. Usually used for carrying loads.
wainwright
A maker of wagons, carts, drays, and other load‑carrying, utilitarian vehicles.
wheeler
One of the pair of horses closest to the vehicle. Wheelers are the only horses in a team able to slow or hold back the vehicle by pulling back on the pole. In a tandem, the wheeler is the rearmost horse working in shafts. Compare leader.
wheelwright
A craftsperson who builds and repairs wheels for carriages, wagons, and carts, including the hub, spokes, and rim; traditionally a separate trade from a coachbuilder.
whip
1. The driver of a coach or carriage.
2. A long, flexible implement used to signal and guide the horses without striking them.

== Y ==
yoke
A wooden or metal crosspiece used to connect a pair of horses at the pole, keeping them aligned and distributing the load.

== French-to-English terminology ==
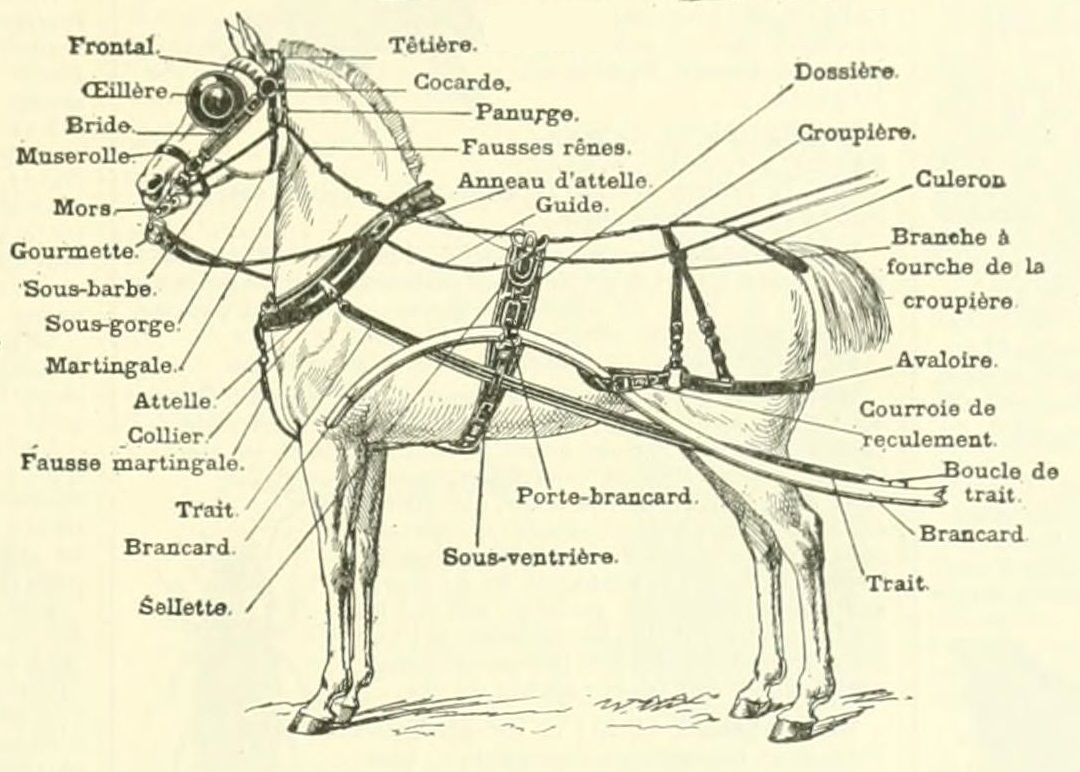
Parts of horse harness (in French, 1898)

This section lists French driving harness, carriage and coachbuilding terms including rare, archaic, and specialist terms commonly seen in period catalogs, museum inventories, coachbuilder archives, and technical literature.

- à 1 cheval: for one horse
- à 1 ou 2 chevaux: convertible for single or pair
- à 2 chevaux: for two horses (a pair)
- abeille (lampe): small side lamp
- aile: wing, fender
- ais de fond: floorboards
- à la Daumont: driven by postilion
- anneau d'attelle: hames ring, terret
- antenne: light pole or shaft extension
- arçon: saddle tree, sometimes an arched structural bow
- arrière train: rear running gear
- assommoir: headboard, front panel
- attelage: harnessing, hitching
- attelle: hames
- avaloire: breeching
- avant train: front running gear, fore-carriage
- bâche: tarpaulin, cover
- banc: seat, bench
- banquette: bench seat
- barre d'attelage: crossbar for hitching
- berline: Berlin (a large enclosed carriage)
- berlinoise: light Berlin style carriage
- bête de somme: packhorse
- bois laqué: lacquered wood
- bois verni: varnished wood
- botte: boot, trunk compartment
- boucle de trait: trace buckle
- brancardier: shaft support (when unhitched)
- brancards: shafts
- branche à fourche de la croupière: hip straps, forked straps supporting the crupper
- break: see break
- bricole: breast collar
- bride: bridle
- caisse relaquée: re-lacquered body
- caisse: body of carriage or coach
- capote en toile: canvas hood
- capote: folding top, hood
- carrosse: coach
- carrossier: coachbuilder
- chaise: a light two-wheeled carriage
- chaise de poste: post chaise, a long distance carriage
- charrette anglaise: English cart, gig
- charrette: cart, usually two wheeled
- châssis: frame, chassis
- cocarde: rosette
- cocher: coachman
- coffre: trunk, storage box
- collier: collar
- coupé: a fore-shortened coach
- coupé dormeuse: sleeping coupé, has a convertible interior
- courroie de reculement: holdback strap
- croupière: crupper strap leading to the crupper piece
- cuir verni: patent leather
- cuir: leather
- culeron: crupper piece (under the tail)
- dais: canopy
- diligence: a French style of stagecoach
- dog cart: dogcart
- dormeuse: sleeper carriage with a reclining interior
- dossière: back strap running from saddle to crupper
- échelle: step ladder, mounting step
- élan: forward rebound or springing motion of the carriage caused by the suspension
- élançons: spring hangers
- équipage: carriage + horses + servants; the whole turnout
- essieu: axle
- fausse martingale: false martingale
- fausses rênes: bearing reins
- ferrures: metal fittings
- flèche: pole for a pair of horses
- frontal: browband
- fronteau: front panel, dashboard
- garde crotte: mudguard
- garniture: upholstery, interior trim
- gourmette: curb chain
- guide: rein
- guides: reins
- impériale: roof seat (on large coaches)
- jante: wheel rim
- landau: a convertible folding-top carriage
- landaulet: small landau with rear folding top
- lanternes: lamps
- limonière: a single central shaft for single horse hitching, not the same connection points as a pole
- malle poste: mail coach
- marchepied: step, footboard
- montants: pillar, upright vertical supports of a coach body
- mors: bit
- muserolle: noseband
- nacelle: a basket style body
- œillères: blinders
- omnibus: horsecar
- panneau: panels
- panurge: bearing rein drop or holder
- phaéton: phaeton an owner-driven open carriage
- porte bagages: luggage rack
- porte cochère: same as the English usage porte cochère
- porte lanterne: lamp bracket
- porte voix: speaking tube from coach interior to driver
- porte-brancard: shaft tugs
- ressorts à lames: leaf springs
- ressorts à pincettes: pincette springs
- ressorts elliptiques: elliptical springs
- ressorts: springs
- roue: wheel
- sellerie: upholstery, saddlery
- sellette: harness saddle
- siège du cocher: driver's seat, box seat
- sous-barbe: chin strap
- sous-gorge: throatlatch
- sous-ventrière: belly band, girth
- suspension à soupente: strap suspension, leather thoroughbraces
- tapissier, tapissière: an upholsterer
- tapissière: a light covered utility wagon (formerly used by tapissières)
- têtière: crownpiece of bridle
- timon: front section of a pole, often reinforced with metal and including a pole cap
- toile: canvas
- train arrière: rear running gear
- train avant: front running gear
- trait: trace
- travail: work harness, working gear
- vis à vis: face to face seating carriage, see Vis-à-vis (carriage)
- voiture de maître: gentleman's carriage, private carriage
- voiturette: small light carriage
- volée: a pivoting bar for traces, see swingletree and whippletree

== Further glossaries ==
Additional glossaries of carriage and driving terminology appear in the following published works.

- Felton, William (1996) [1796]. "Glossary and Index". A Treatise on Carriages (Reprint of both volumes). Astragal Press. pp. Volume II, pages 181-200. ISBN 1879335700. OL 21753408M. (18th century terms)
- Ryder, Tom (1983) [1969]. "Glossary". On the Box Seat: A Manual of Driving (4th ed.). Salem, New Jersey: The Carriage Journal. pp. 176–178. OCLC 10886033. OL 58654121M.
- Smith, D.J.M. (1988). "Glossary of Parts and Gears". A Dictionary of Horse Drawn Vehicles. J. A. Allen & Co. Ltd. pp. 183–189. ISBN 0851314686. OL 11597864M.

In addition, several works formatted alphabetically in dictionary or encyclopedia style include Berkebile (1978), Smith (1988), and Walrond (1979).

== See also ==
- Bibliography of carriages and driving
