= Bibliography of carriages and driving =

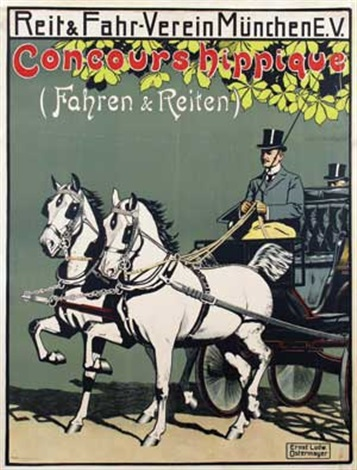
An 1895 magazine cover for the Munich Riding and Driving Club

The bibliography of carriages and driving lists major works on horse-drawn vehicles, carriage construction, coachbuilding, harness, and the practice of driving. The field includes historical manuals, technical dictionaries, periodicals, museum catalogs, commercial catalogs, and modern scholarship. Many of these works are sources for terminology, construction methods, and vehicle types, and they form a core literature used in the study, restoration, and documentation of horse-drawn transport.

Scope: This bibliography emphasizes carriage and driving works that can be read online through Open Library, Archive.org, and similar repositories. It is a curated selection rather than a complete list of all works in the field.

== Dictionaries and terminology ==
These references define the specialized vocabulary of carriage construction, driving, and vehicle classification. They are essential for understanding historical texts, identifying vehicle types, and maintaining consistent terminology.

- Berkebile, Donald H. (1978). Carriage Terminology: An Historical Dictionary. Smithsonian Institution Scholarly Press. ISBN 9781935623434. OL 4534466M.
- Smith, D.J.M. (1988). A Dictionary of Horse Drawn Vehicles. J. A. Allen & Co. Ltd. ISBN 0851314686. OL 11597864M.
- Walrond, Sallie (1979). The Encyclopaedia of Driving. Country Life Books. ISBN 0600331822. OL 4175648M.

== Contemporary works ==
This section includes modern works of historical studies and analyses of horse-drawn vehicles, modern driving practices, and related subjects for contemporary audiences.

- Arnold, James (1979). All drawn by horses. David & Charles. ISBN 0715376829. OL 4489383M.
- Berkebile, Donald H. (1977). American Carriages, Sleighs, Sulkies, and Carts: 168 illustrations from Victorian sources. Dover Publications. ISBN 0486233286. OL 4886678M.
- Berkebile, Donald H. (1989). Horse-drawn Commercial Vehicles. Dover Publications. ISBN 0486260208. OL 2209008M.
- Hart, Edward (1981). The Harness Horse. Shire Publications. ISBN 0852635044. OL 11603460M.
- Hart, Edward (1992). The Heavy Horse. Shire Publications. ISBN 0852634528. OL 11603447M.
- Lessiter, Frank (1977). Horse Power. Reiman Publications. OL 4900757M.
- Libourel, Jean-Louis (2005). Voitures hippomobiles : vocabulaire typologique et technique [Horse-drawn vehicles: Typological and technical vocabulary] (411 pages) (in French). Monum, Éditions du patrimoine. ISBN 2-85822-798-5.
- Nockolds, Harold, ed. (1977). The Coachmakers: A History of the Worshipful Company of Coachmakers and Coach Harness Makers, 1677-1977. JA Allen. ISBN 0851312705. OL 26258137M.
- Parry, David (1979). English Horse Drawn Vehicles. Frederick Warne & Co. ISBN 0723221723. OL 4485663M.
- Smith, D. J. (1974). Discovering Horse Drawn Carriages. Shire Publications Ltd. ISBN 085263286X. OL 32721875M.
- Smith, D. J. (1985). Discovering Horse-drawn Commercial Vehicles (2nd ed.). Shire Publications Ltd. ISBN 0852637217. OL 17357519M.
- Thompson, John (1977). Horse-drawn Trade Vehicles. ISBN 0950577510. OL 4477363M.
- Vince, John (1989) [1987]. Discovering Carts and Wagons (3rd ed.). Shire Publications Ltd. ISBN 0-85263-885-X. OL 17414160M.
- Walrond, Sallie (1980). Looking at Carriages. Pelham Books. ISBN 0720712823. OL 3828623M.
- "The Carriage Journal (1963–2021)" (digital editions). Carriage Association of America.

== Driving manuals ==
These contemporary and historical works focus on the practice of driving and coaching. They include instructional manuals, sporting guides, and treatises on etiquette, technique, and the operation of horse-drawn vehicles.

- Beach, Belle (1912). Riding and Driving for Women. Charles Scribner's Sons. OL 6548093M.
- Beaufort, Henry Charles FitzRoy Somerset (Duke of Beaufort) (1901). Driving. London: Longmans, Green and Company. OL 22878921M.
- Belmont, Oliver H. P. (1901). "Coaching". In Patten, William (ed.). The Book of Sport. New York: J.F. Taylor & Co. OL 24131749M.
- HRH the Duke of Edinburgh (2005). 30 Years On and Off the Box Seat. J. A. Allen. ISBN 0851318983. OL 11598049M.
- Rogers, Fairman (1899). Manual of Coaching. J. B. Lippincott Company. OL 20478464M.
- Ryder, Tom (1983) [1969]. On the Box Seat: A Manual of Driving (4th ed.). Salem, New Jersey: The Carriage Journal. OCLC 10886033. OL 58654121M.
- Underhill, Francis T (1896). Driving for Pleasure; or, The harness stable and its appointments. D. Appleton & Company. OL 7038031M.
- Walrond, Sallie (1977). A Guide to Driving Horses. Pelham Books. ISBN 072071009X. OL 4477889M.
- Walrond, Sallie (1995). Driving Questions Answered. Kenilworth Press. ISBN 1872082807. OL 8652287M.
- Ware, Francis M (1902). Our Noblest Friend the Horse. L.C. Page. OL 6921929M.
- Ware, Francis M (1903). Driving. Doubleday, Page & Company. LCCN 03032159. OL 16779173M.

== Museum works ==
Publications in this section accompany museum collections or exhibitions of horse-drawn vehicles and accessories. They often include authoritative descriptions, provenance information, technical drawings, and high-quality photographs of historically significant carriages.

- Carlisle, Lilian Baker (1956). The Carriages at Shelburne Museum. Shelburne Museum. OL 6215577M.
- D'Amato, Michael P. (2004). Horse-drawn Funeral Vehicles. Carriage Museum of America. ISBN 1880499142. OL 15572789M.
- Mackay-Smith, Alexander; Druesedow, Jean R.; Ryder, Thomas (1984). Man and the Horse: An Illustrated History of Equestrian Apparel. Metropolitan Museum of Art. ISBN 0870994115. OL 2859979M.
- Museums at Stony Brook (1987). 19th Century American Carriages: Their Manufacture, Decoration and Use. Museums at Stony Brook. ISBN 0943924103. OL 27939222M.
- The Royal Mews: Buckingham Palace. London: Pitkin Pictorials. 1972. ISBN 0853720673. OL 24943303M.

== General histories ==
Works in this section provide broad overviews of horse-drawn vehicles, their development, and their cultural or technological context. These sources survey multiple carriage types and often trace the evolution of transport, road systems, and coachbuilding traditions.

- Adams, William Bridges (1837). English Pleasure Carriages; their origin, history, varieties, materials, construction, defects, improvements, and capabilities. Charles Knight & Co. OL 7004487M.
- Damase, Jacques (1968). Carriages. G. P. Putnam's Sons. OL 5604950M.
- Gilbey, Sir Walter (1903). Early Carriages and Roads. London: Vinton & Co. OL 6933350M.
- Gilbey, Sir Walter (1905). Modern Carriages. London: Vinton & Co. OL 23619083M.
- Huggett, Frank E. (1980) [1979]. Carriages at Eight: Horse-drawn Society in Victorian and Edwardian Times. Charles Scribner's Sons. ISBN 0684164213. OL 4431686M.
- Straus, Ralph (1912). Carriages & Coaches: Their History & Their Evolution. Martin Secker. OL 7060904M. (eBook downloads at Project Gutenberg)
- Tarr, László (1969). The History of the Carriage. New York: Arco Publishing Company. ISBN 0668018712. OL 5682797M.
- Thrupp, George Athelstane (1877). The History of Coaches. London: Kerby & Endean. OL 21852659M.

== Coachbuilding manuals ==
These works document the craft of coachbuilding, wheelmaking, harness making, and carriage painting. Many are primary sources written by 18th–20th century tradespeople and provide detailed information on construction methods, materials, tools, and workshop practices.

- Burgess, James W (1881). A Practical Treatise on Coach-building : Historical and descriptive. Crosby Lockwood and Co. OL 22890382M.
- Felton, William (1996) [1796]. A Treatise on Carriages (Reprint of both volumes). Astragal Press. ISBN 1879335700. OL 21753408M.
- Fitz-Gerald, William N. (1875). The Harness Makers' Illustrated Manual. New York. OL 24600299M.
- Fitz-Gerald, William N. (1878). Harness and Carriage Journal Almanac 1878. New York, NY: William N. Fitz-Gerald. OL 25225355M.
- Hillick, Mayton Clarence (1903). Practical Carriage and Wagon Painting. Press of the Western Painter. OL 6953771M.
- Carriage Museum of America (1996). Peloubet, Don (ed.). Wheelmaking : Wooden Wheel Design and Construction. Astragal Press. ISBN 1879335735. OL 1023069M.
- Stratton, Ezra M. (1858). The New York Coach-maker's Magazine. E.M. Stratton. OCLC 31120349. OL 25480560M.
- Stratton, Ezra M. (1878). The World on Wheels; on Carriages, with their historical associations from the earliest to the present time. New York: The author. OCLC 3570369. OL 7004294M.
- Webster, Thomas (1861). "Book XXIII Carriages". An Encyclopædia of Domestic Economy (New ed.). Longman, Green, Longman, and Roberts. pp. 1103–1127. OL 33089220M.

== Commercial catalogs ==
Commercial catalogs are primary sources produced by carriage manufacturers, wheelwrights, and harness makers. They illustrate the range of vehicles available for purchase, provide period terminology, and document stylistic and technological trends.

- Brewster & Baldwin (1869). Brewster & Baldwin's Illustrated Catalogue of Carriages. LCCN unk81021200. OL 25207750M.
- Delin Carriage Company (1911). Vehicles, Harness, Saddles: Direct to you - on approval. (catalog). Cincinnati: n.p. OL 26197453M.
- S. D. Kimbark Co. (1876). Illustrated Catalogue. Chicago: S. D. Kimbark. OL 24598506M.
- S. D. Kimbark Co. (1903). Catalogue: Half Century Edition. S. D. Kimbark Co. OL 6931484M.
- Lawrence, Bradley & Pardee (1998). Carriages and Sleighs: 200 illustrations from the 1862 Lawrence, Bradley, and Pardee catalog. Dover Publications. ISBN 0486402193. OL 347903M.

== Related works ==
These publications contain material relevant to the study of horse-drawn transport, including stable management, equine history, military logistics, and genealogies of prominent coachbuilding families.

- Garland, James Albert (1903). The Private Stable : Its establishment, management and appointments. Little, Brown, and Company. OL 23327262M.
- Haajanen, Lennart W. (2007). Illustrated Dictionary of Automobile Body Styles. McFarland & Company. ISBN 9780786437375. OL 9550033M.
- Harper, Merritt W. (1915) [1913]. Management and Breeding of Horses. New York: Orange Judd Company. OL 24168673M.
- Jones, Emma C Brewster (1908). The Brewster Genealogy, 1566-1907. LCCN 09012408. OL 7007780M.
- Shaw, Vero (1909). The Encyclopaedia of the Stable. George Routledge & Sons, Limited. OCLC 3806740. OL 23297448M.
- Wilhelm, Thomas (1881). A Military Dictionary and Gazetteer (Revised ed.). Philadelphia: L. R. Hamersley & Co. OL 6576438M.

== Bibliographies in published works ==
Extensive bibliography lists can be found in the following books.

- Beaufort, Henry Charles FitzRoy Somerset (Duke of Beaufort) (1901). "The Bibliography of Driving". Driving. London: Longmans, Green and Company. pp. 390–396. OL 22878921M.
- Berkebile, Donald H. (1978). "Selected Bibliography". Carriage Terminology: An Historical Dictionary. Smithsonian Institution Scholarly Press. pp. 483–487. ISBN 9781935623434. OL 4534466M.
- Ryder, Tom (1983) [1969]. "Bibliography". On the Box Seat: A Manual of Driving (4th ed.). Salem, New Jersey: The Carriage Journal. p. 174-175. OCLC 10886033. OL 58654121M.
- Walrond, Sallie (1979). "Bibliography". The Encyclopaedia of Driving. Country Life Books. pp. 301–302. ISBN 0600331822. OL 4175648M.

== See also ==
- Glossary of carriage and driving terminology
- History of horse-drawn transport
- List of carriage museums
