= Vis-à-vis (carriage) =

Four-wheeled horse-drawn vehicle

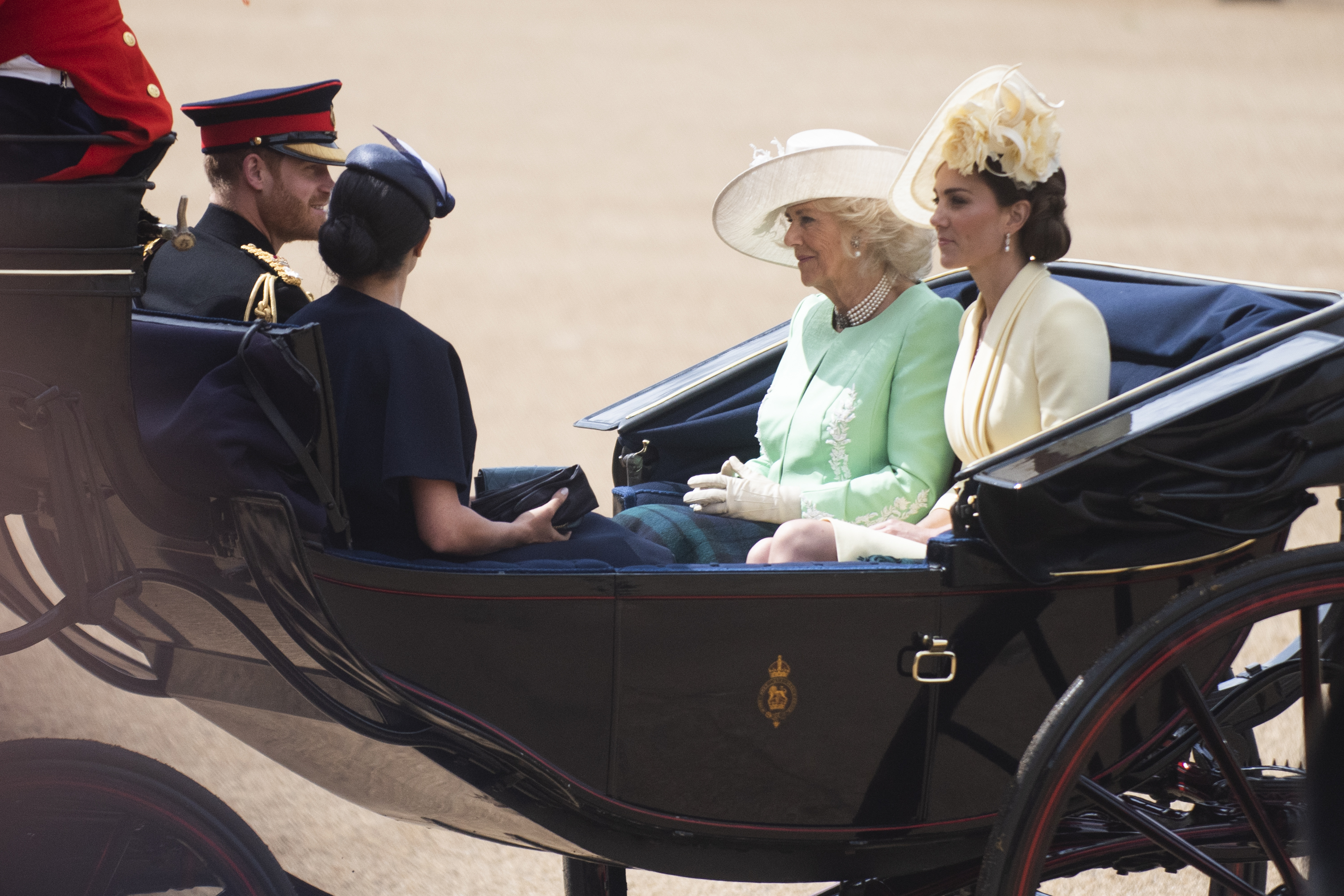
Passengers sitting vis-à-vis

Vis-à-vis has two meanings in carriage driving: a general seating arrangement with passengers sitting face-to-face, and a specific narrow carriage for just two passengers.

== Carriage seating arrangement ==
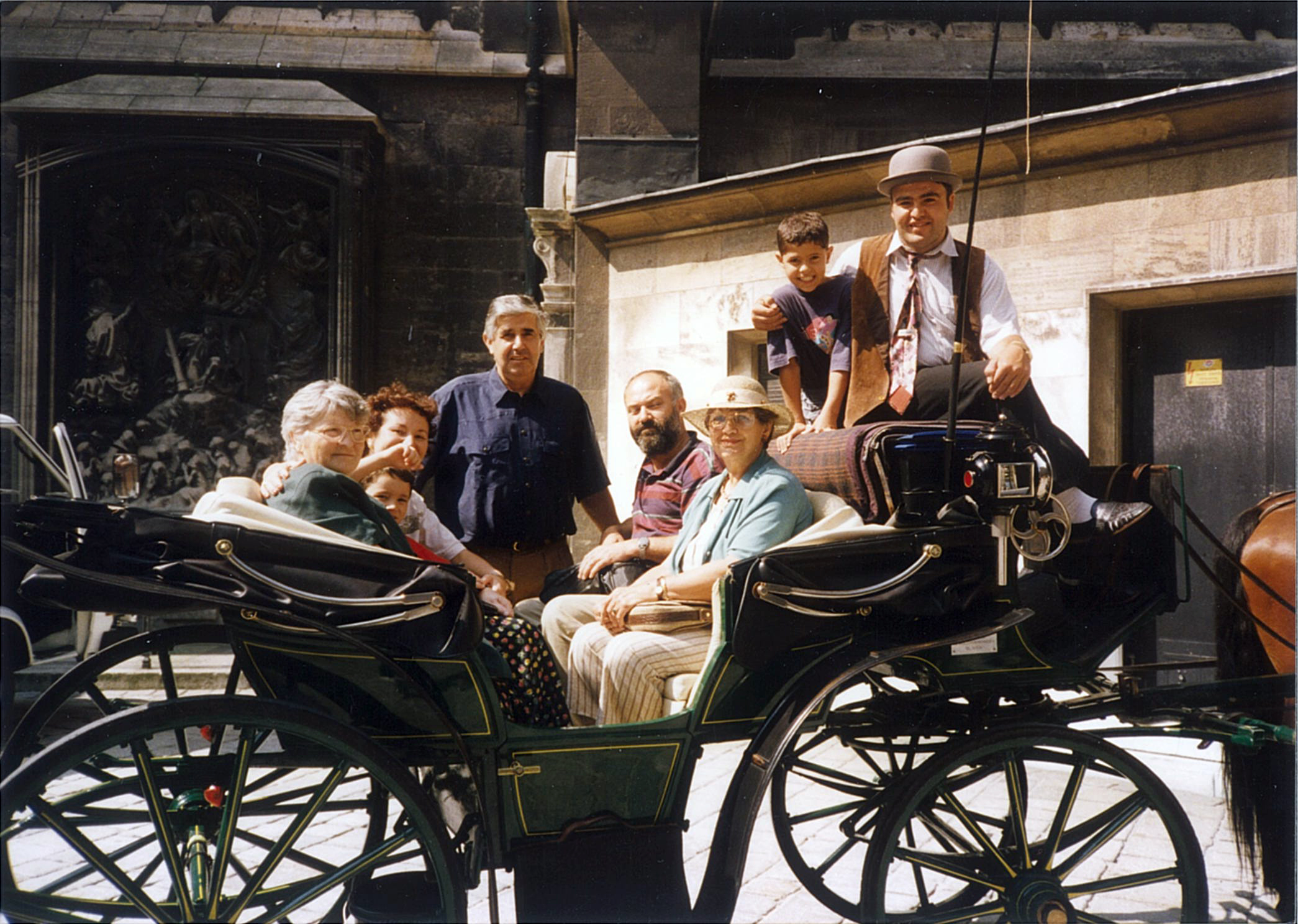
Vis-à-vis seating arrangement in a tourist carriage, Vienna 2005

Vis-à-vis is one of the five seating arrangements of carriages. (Note: The five seating arrangements are (1) two transverse seats, both facing forward, (2) two transverse seats, passengers face-to-face, (3) two transverse seats, passengers back-to-back, (4) longitudinal seats, back-to-back, (5) longitudinal seats, face-to-face.) Vis-à-vis is French for "face to face", and these carriages are four-wheeled and hold four passengers. There are two crosswise seats in the body, with two people seated in the rear facing forward, and two seated in the front facing rearward, so that passengers sit face-to-face with each other. Such a seating arrangement is the most common seen in tourist carriages, regardless of actual carriage type, because they carry many passengers in a social setting, with easy entry, a good view, and independent seating for the coachman up front. In the wagonette seating arrangement, passengers also sit face-to-face, but the seating is longitudinal instead of crosswise (passengers travel sideways), and it is not called a vis-à-vis.

Several carriage types have vis-à-vis seating arrangements, such as the Barouche, Karozzin, Landau, and Sociable. All coaches have vis-à-vis seating arrangements; examples include the Berlin and Clarence.

== The vis-à-vis carriage ==
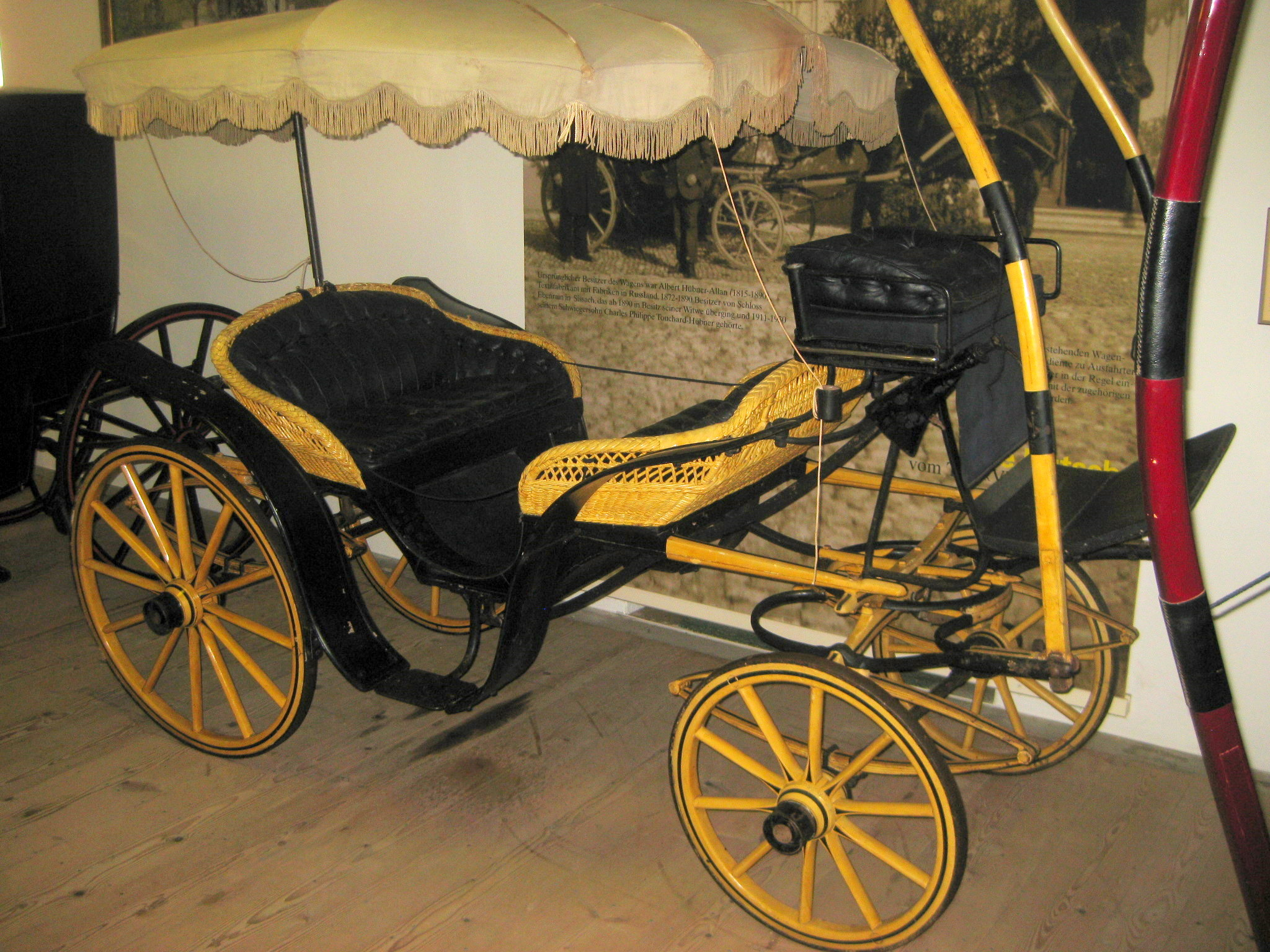
An example of a narrow vis-à-vis horse-drawn carriage for just two passengers

The original vis-à-vis carriage carried only two passengers. It is a longitudinal "halving" of a carriage body, narrowing the carriage to where there is only one passenger seated facing forward and another passenger facing rearward. It was driven by a coachman.

Walrond states that the term vis-à-vis became used for "any carriage of questionable identity, providing that the passengers sit face-to-face", whereas Smith in 1974 opines that the use of "vis-à-vis" for anything other than the original carriage of two single seats facing each other is "wrongly used".

== Vis-à-vis automobiles ==
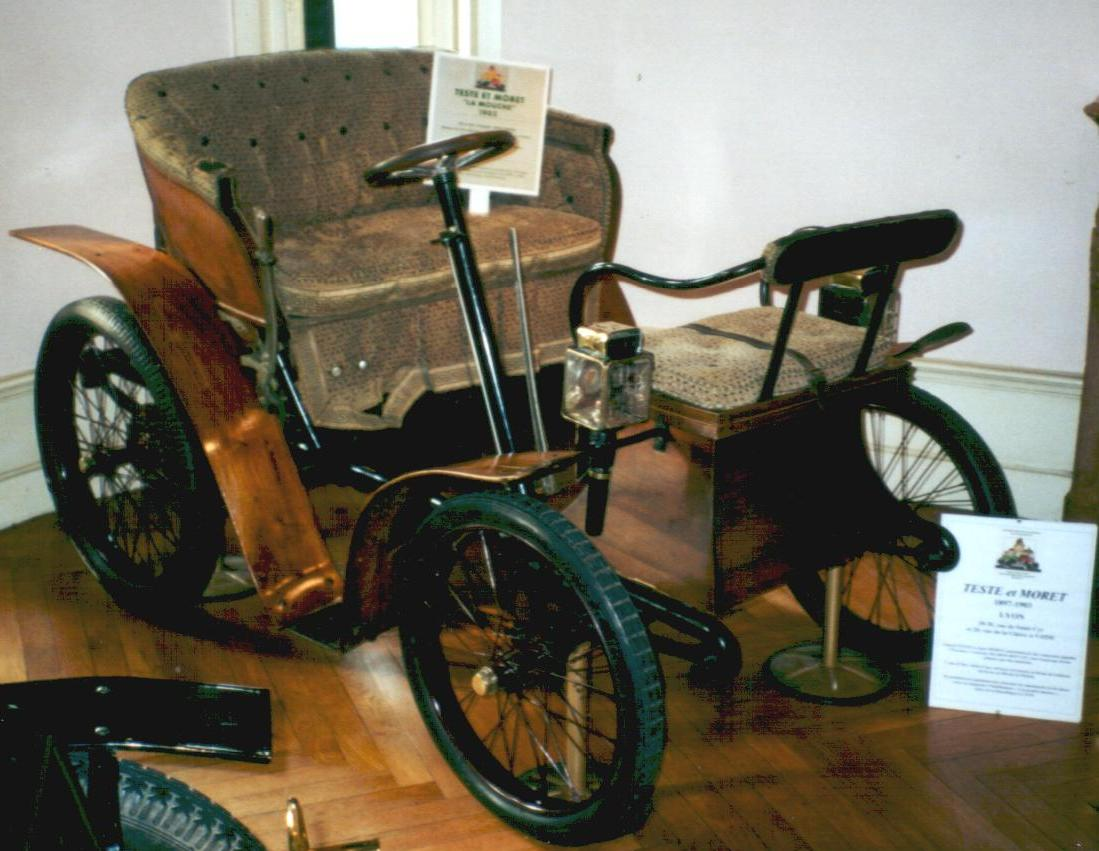
1902 Test & Moret Vis-à-vis automobile

There were vis-à-vis automobiles in the early history of motoring. These were driven from the forward-facing rear seat, with front passengers sitting ahead of the steering controls and facing the driver. Passengers in the front seat would obstruct the vision of the driver in the rear seat, and the style fell out of favour before 1905.

== See also ==
- Horse-drawn vehicle
- History of horse-drawn transport
