= Marathon carriage =

Modern competition carriage

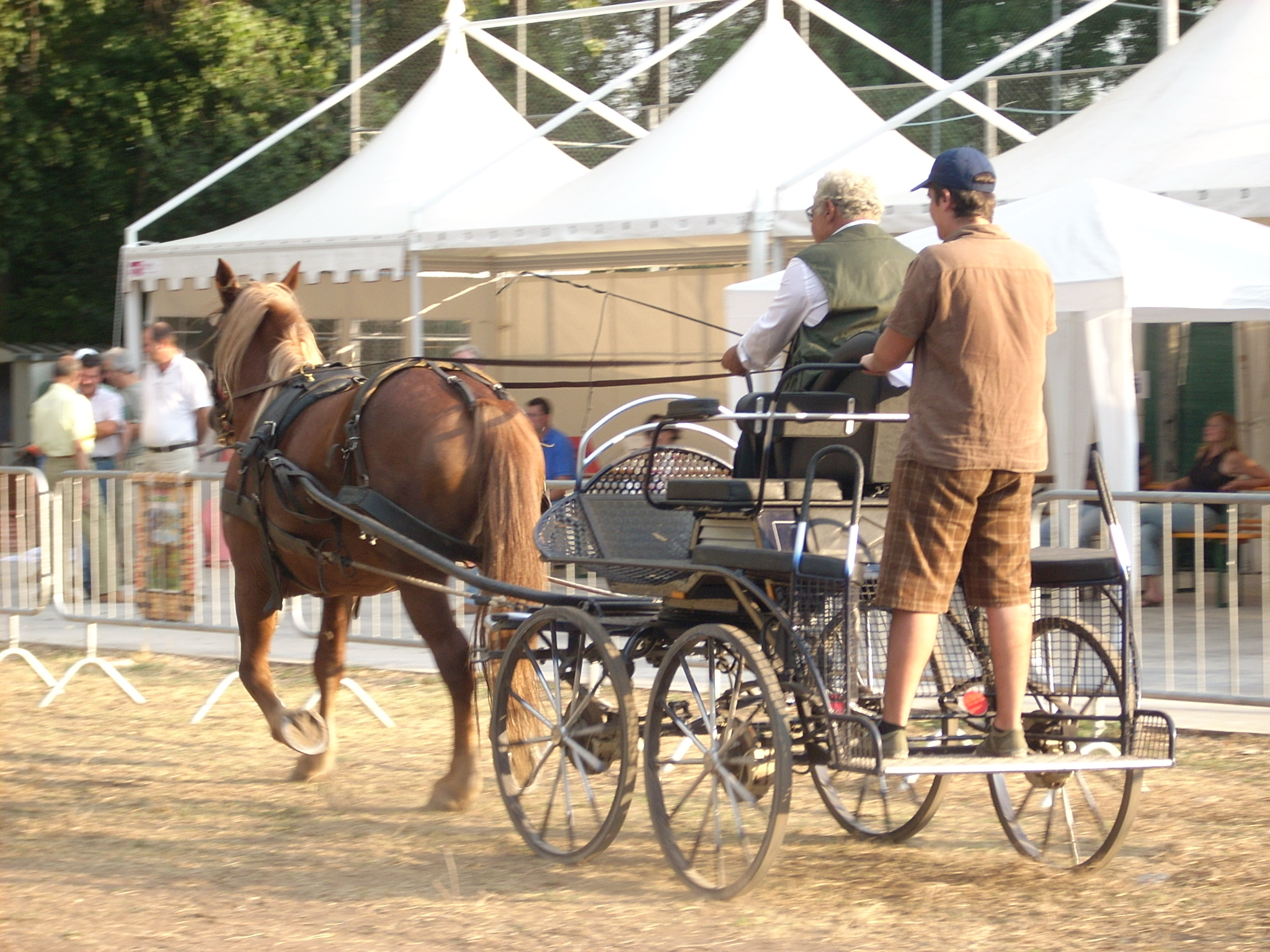
Metal marathon carriage

Marathon carriage in action

A marathon carriage is a modern metal carriage that is used for driving competitions, especially combined driving. It is named after the cross-country phase of a combined driving event which, though inaccurate, became known as the "marathon" phase. The carriage is designed for safety and carries a driver plus one or two assistants, called grooms. Drivers direct the horses while grooms counterbalance the carriage on tight turns, and are available for assistance with the horses in case of an overturn or collision, or equipment malfunction.

In the marathon phase of combined driving, competitors navigate a series of obstacles designed to test the agility, speed, and control of the horses and carriages. These obstacles often include water crossings, tight turns around posts, steep inclines, and narrow passages. Each obstacle is constructed to challenge the driver's precision, the horses' obedience, and the groom's ability to counterbalance the carriage. Clearances are tight and posts are often placed to require sharp tight turns. The course layout demands quick decision-making, making the design features of the marathon carriage—such as cambered wheels, bumper bars, and low centers of gravity—essential for safe and successful maneuvering.

== Design ==
A marathon carriage is made of steel or aluminum, with non-slip surfaces and wide fenders (mud guards) because it may be travelling through water and mud during competition. They are constructed for safety with a low center of gravity, and a very small turning radius, both of which help reduce the chance of overturning. A low platform for the groom at the rear allows a crouching groom to further lower the center of gravity. They usually include hydraulic disc brakes, suspension (either air or spring), and plenty of handholds for the grooms. Many of these vehicles are made with adjustable-width axles to conform with requirements for minimum track widths in certain competitions.

Shafts for single-horse carriages are shortened to terminate at the harness saddle instead of reaching the horse's point of shoulder. The driver's seat is usually raised with high sides to keep the driver in position. Many teams have the groom holding a belt around the driver's hips to keep the driver secure during maneuvers, but if the carriage overturns, the driver will not be pinned as he might with a locked in seat belt.

Wheels have metal spokes, welded at the hub, which can tolerate sideways forces. Hubs are constructed flat; traditional wooden wheels have protruding hubs which have caused difficulties in the marathon obstacles. Some vehicles are designed with cambered wheels to reduce sideways sliding. Marathon vehicles are constructed with horizontal guard rails (bumper bars) to deflect the carriage from posts and small trees and keep from getting caught on them. A bowed rail across the front protects the front wheels, and rails running down each side over the wheels keeps from getting a post caught between the front and rear wheels when turning sharply around a post. The open back design makes for easier, quicker and safer entry and exit of a groom, who previously entered from the side between the wheels. Looking quite different from traditional carriages, they acquired the nickname "battle wagons".

Since a marathon carriage is built with the front axle pivoting on a turntable (usually called a fifth-wheel), the front wheels can rotate until one wheel is fully under the body of the carriage. During such tight turns, the carriage operates like a three-wheeled vehicle (one wheel in front), and the entire carriage can easily tip over if not careful, risking severe injury to the occupants.

Design features

High-sided seat and groom holding belt around driver's hips

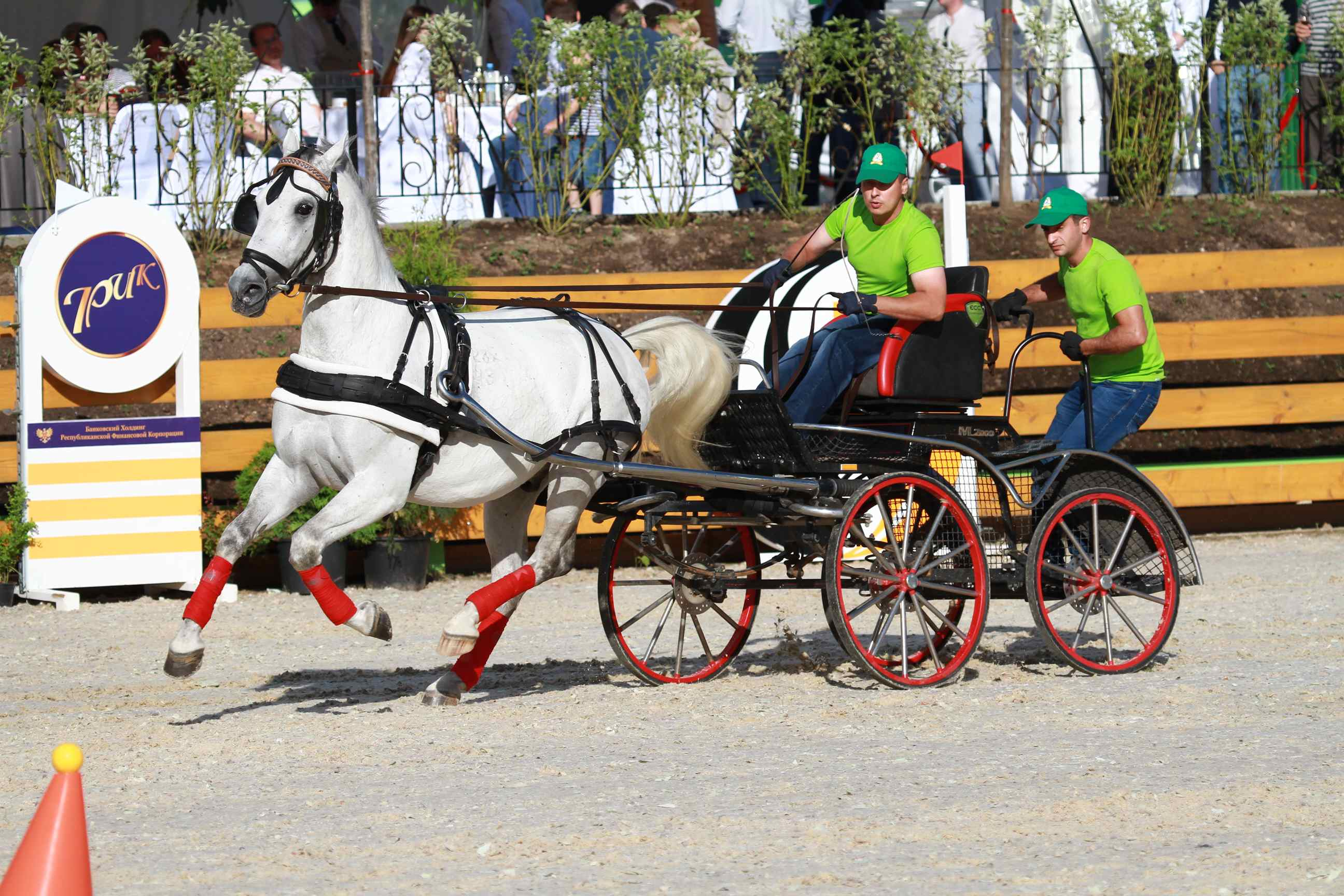
Shortened shafts

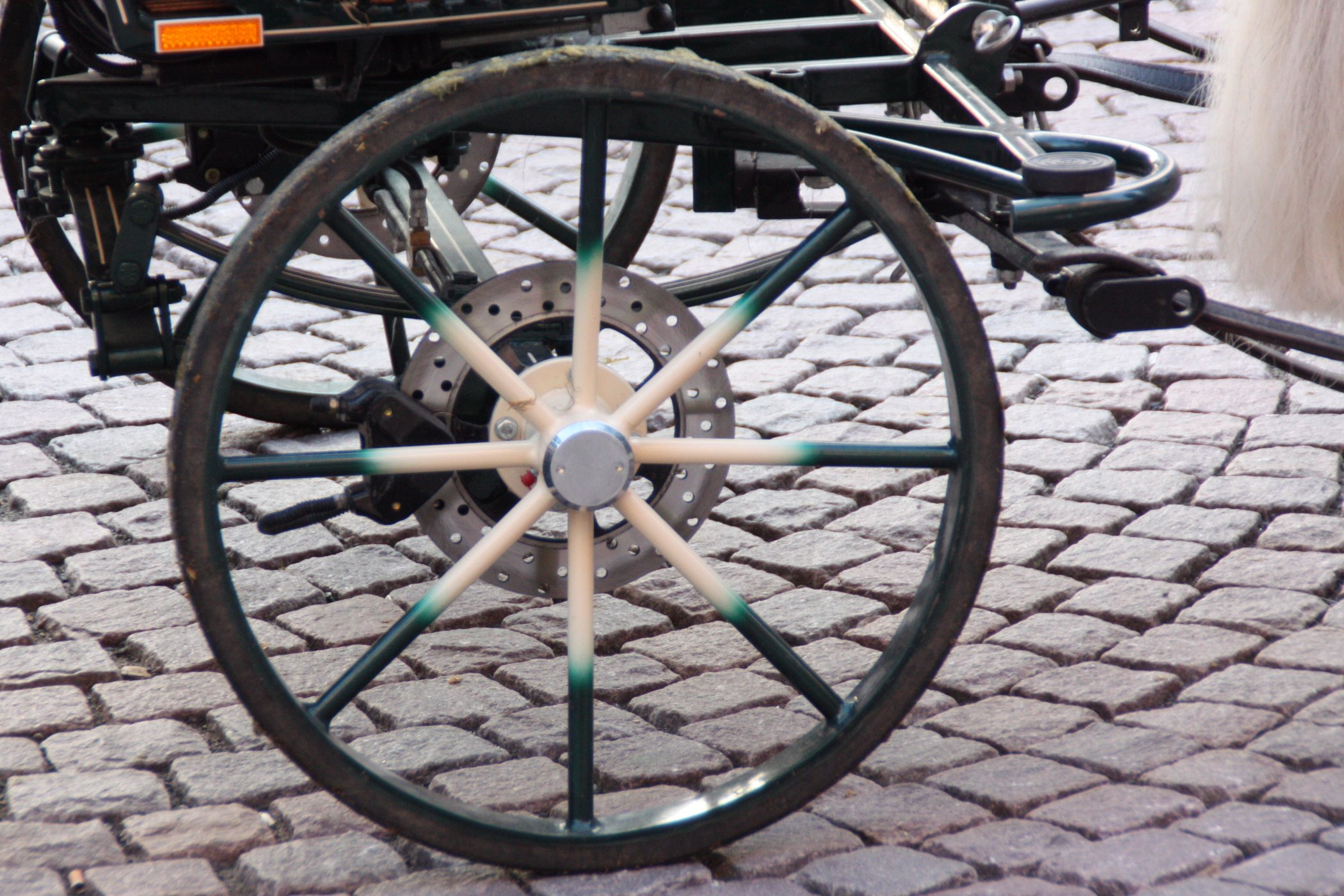
Disc brakes

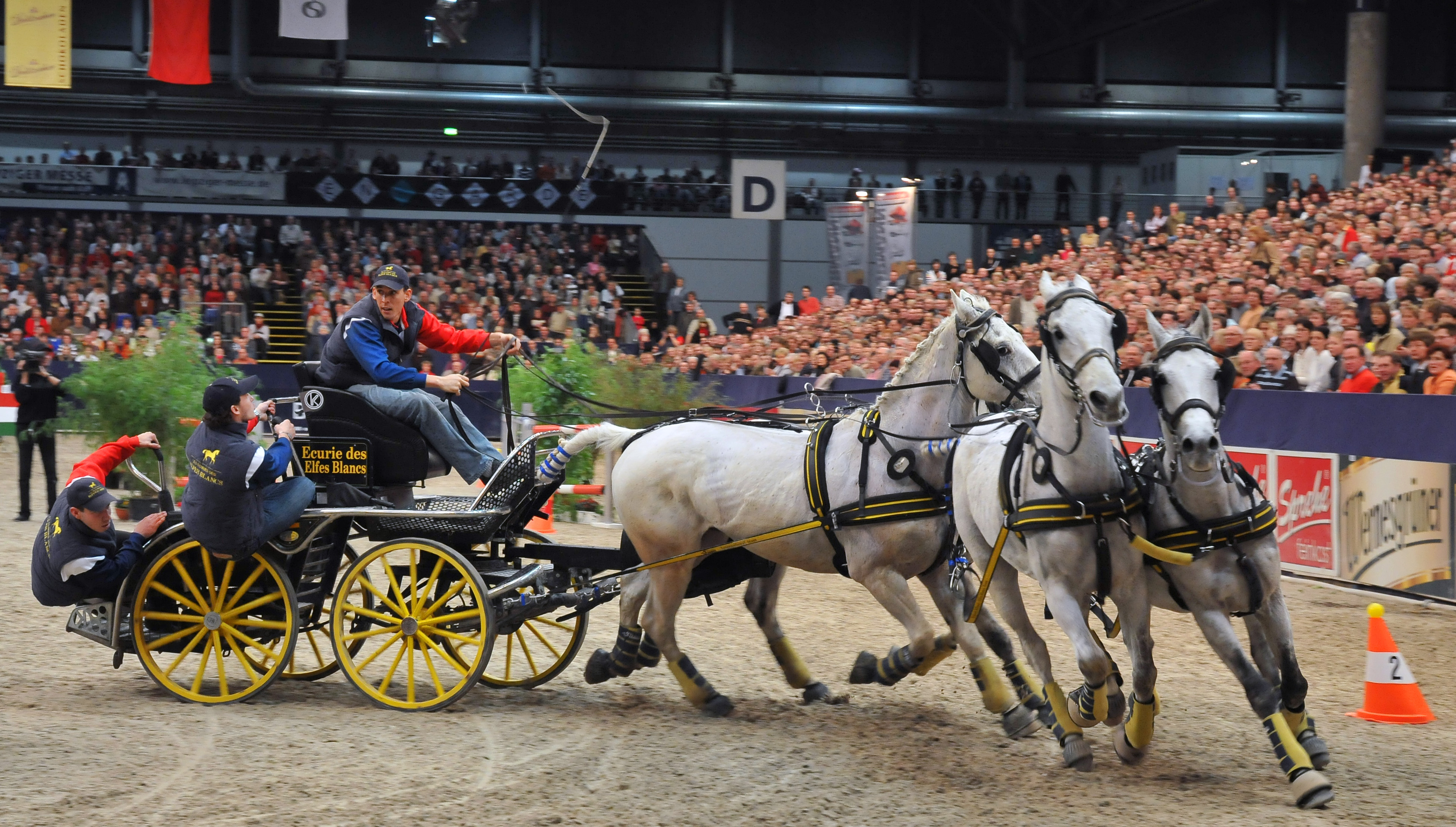
Some extreme counterbalancing on this highspeed tight turn

== Historical context ==
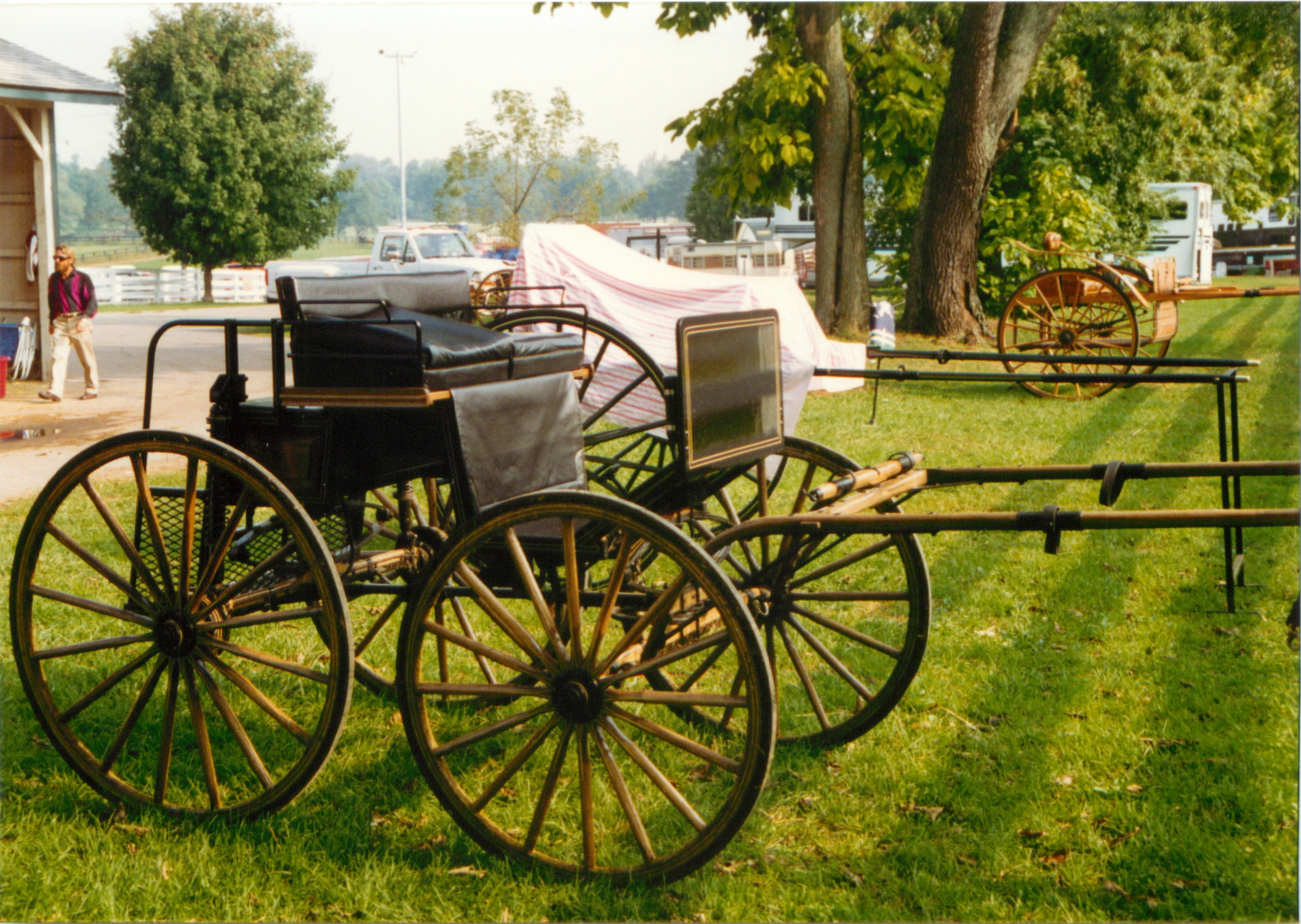
A Bird-in-hand Flyer, a typical marathon carriage in 1990s USA

Prince Philip, Duke of Edinburgh popularized sport carriage driving in England in the 1970s, and helped standardize competition rules through the FEI. Having access to many old carriages of the royal stables, he soon discovered they were not up to the rigors of maneuvering in marathon obstacles, and several carriages were damaged or destroyed. Drivers looked to contemporary carriage makers, such as the Amish in the US, to make sturdier wooden vehicles appropriate for sport driving, followed by more innovative designers and the invention of the all-metal carriages.

== Modern usage ==
In FEI driving competitions, marathon carriages are the only style of carriage allowed for the marathon portion of a combined driving competition, and are allowed in driven dressage which previously required a traditional carriage. Minimum widths and weights of the carriage are also regulated. Except at the lowest levels of competition, the tyres of the wheels must be solid metal or rubber.

== See also ==
- Combined driving
