= Berlin (carriage) =

Type of horse-drawn carriage

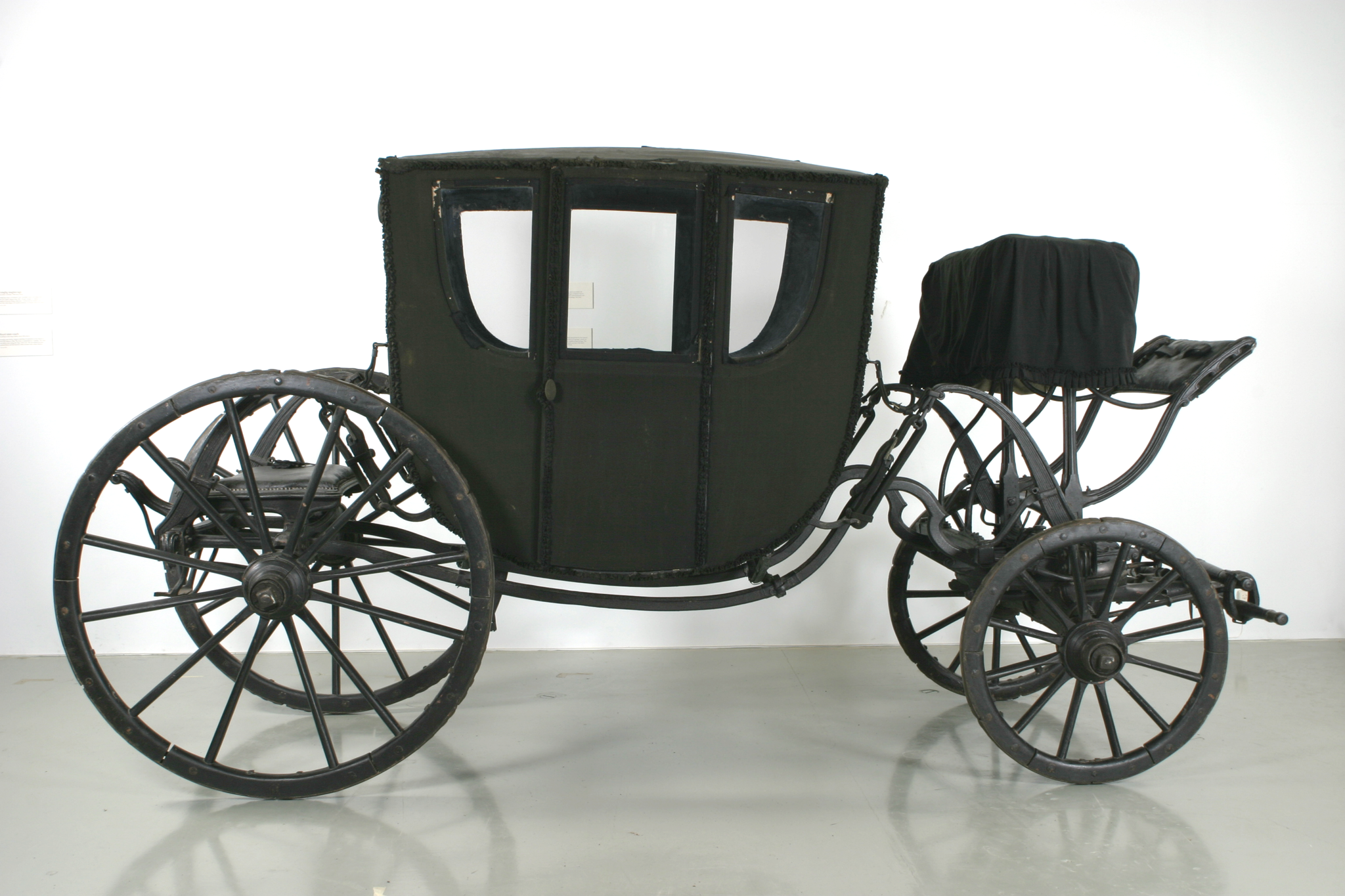
Black berline

A Berlin, or Berline, carriage is a type of enclosed four-wheeled coach. The word "Berlin" was initially applied to the new style of undercarriage using two perch rails and having the body suspended by leather straps, called thoroughbraces. The Berlin-undercarriage could be used with any number of carriage or coach styles, but the Berlin eventually became known as a particular coach-body style and shape.

In his book Voitures hippomobiles: vocabulaire typologique et technique, carriage historian Jean‑Louis Libourel describes the berline as follows:

Berline: A carriage with a closed body, with two ends and two doors, containing two seats facing each other for four people. Throughout the eighteenth century, Berlines are distinguished from coaches, although they share the same decorative richness, by their running gear, which is characterized by two parallel poles, called the brancards de train (double perch). —Jean‑Louis Libourel

== History ==
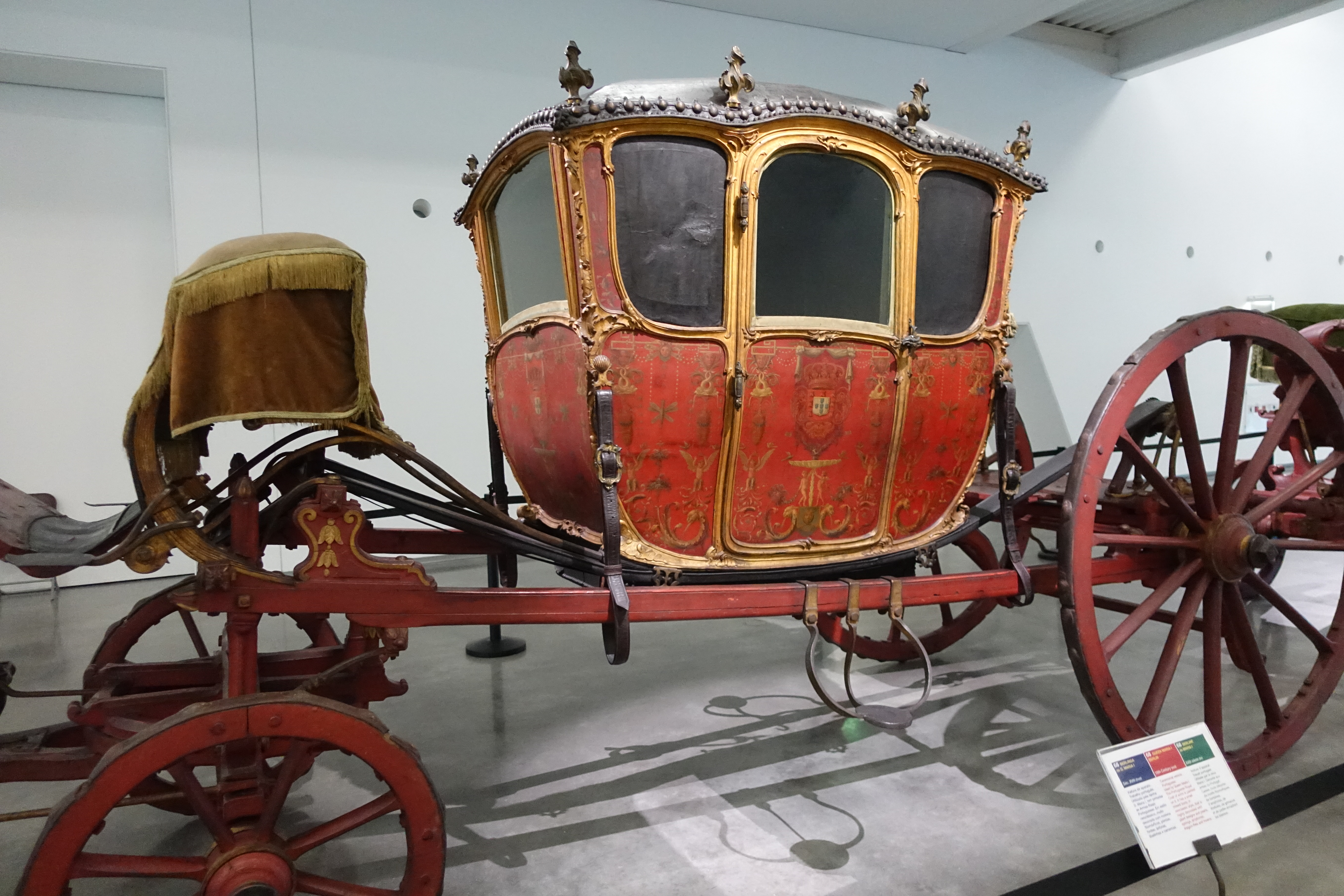
Early Berlin showing the double perch and leather brace system

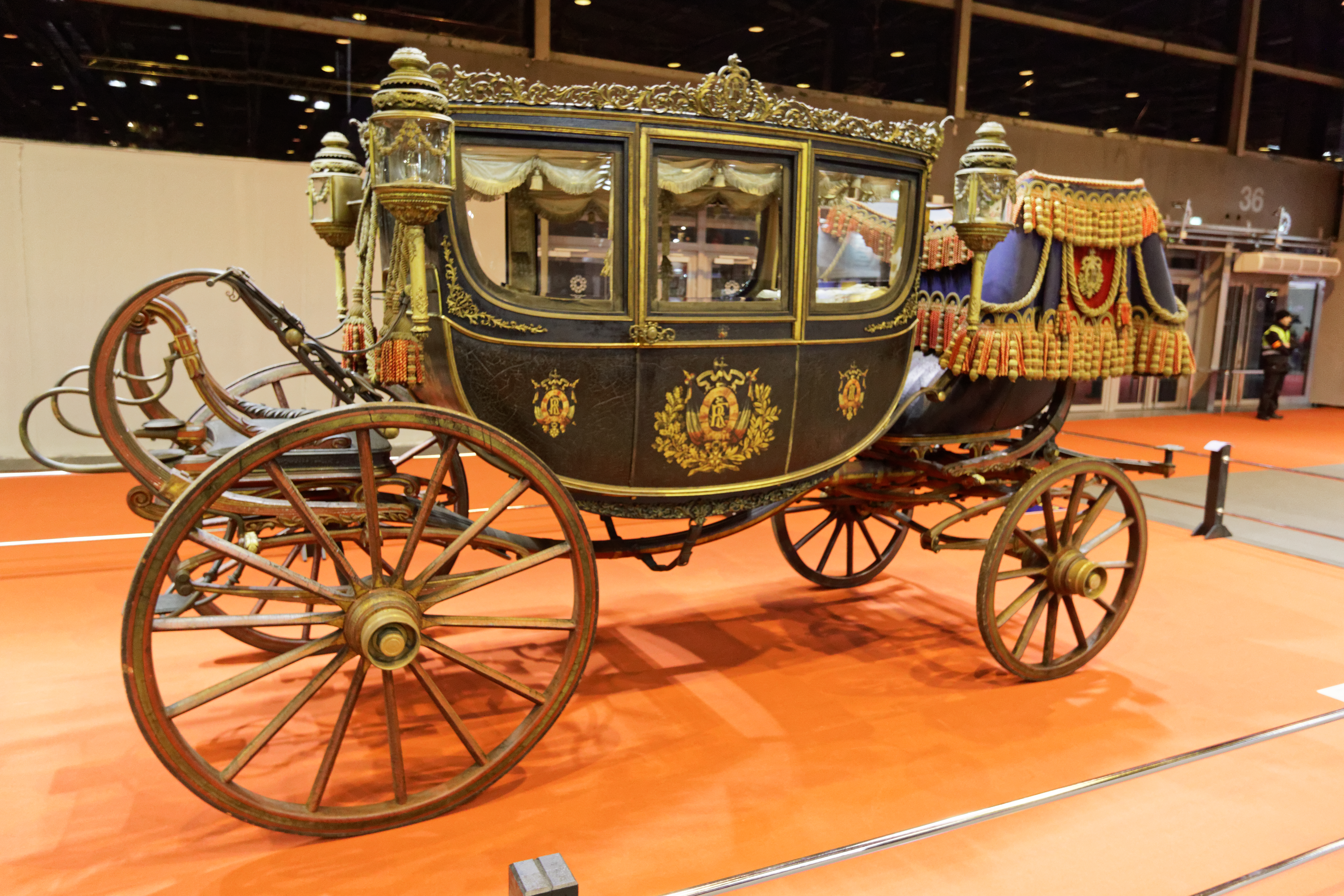
Later Berlin showing a single undercarriage perch and 4 additional elliptical steel springs

The carriage was designed around 1660 or 1670 by a Piedmontese architect commissioned by the General quartermaster to Frederick William, Elector of Brandenburg, who used the carriage to travel 1,054 km (654.9 mi) from Berlin to Paris, where his carriage created a sensation.

While some heavy-duty vehicles had used double perches before, passenger vehicles had normally used a single perch. The elegant but durable style was widely copied and named "berline" after the city from which the carriage had come. It was more convenient than other carriages of the time, being lighter and less likely to overturn. The berline began to supplant the less practical and less comfortable state coaches and gala coaches in the 17th century.

In the 18th century, steel springs became widely used in carriage suspensions, supplanting the berline's twin-strap suspension system. The term "berline" survived as a description of the formal or ceremonial body style with two bench seats facing each other in an enclosed carriage.

== Berlin coupé ==
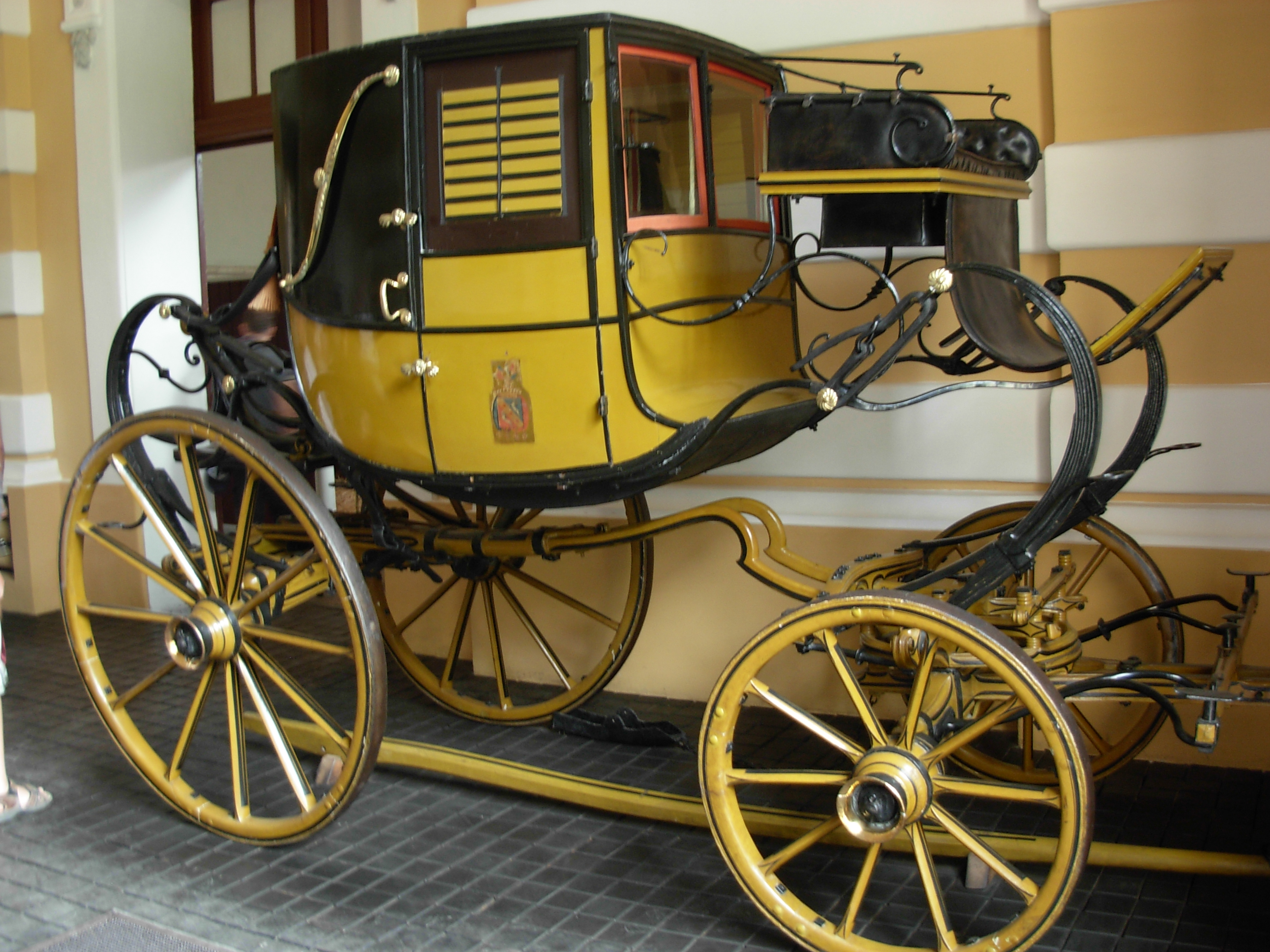
Berlin coupé

Smaller carriages were developed from the berline by removing the rear-facing front seat, keeping a single forward-facing seat, and shortening the body. Sometimes a very small fold-down seat was installed to accommodate young children in the carriage. This style was known as the berline coupé (cut berline) in French, halbberline (half berlin) in German, and also berlinet or berlinette. Berlin coupé was often shortened to coupé.

== Automobile ==
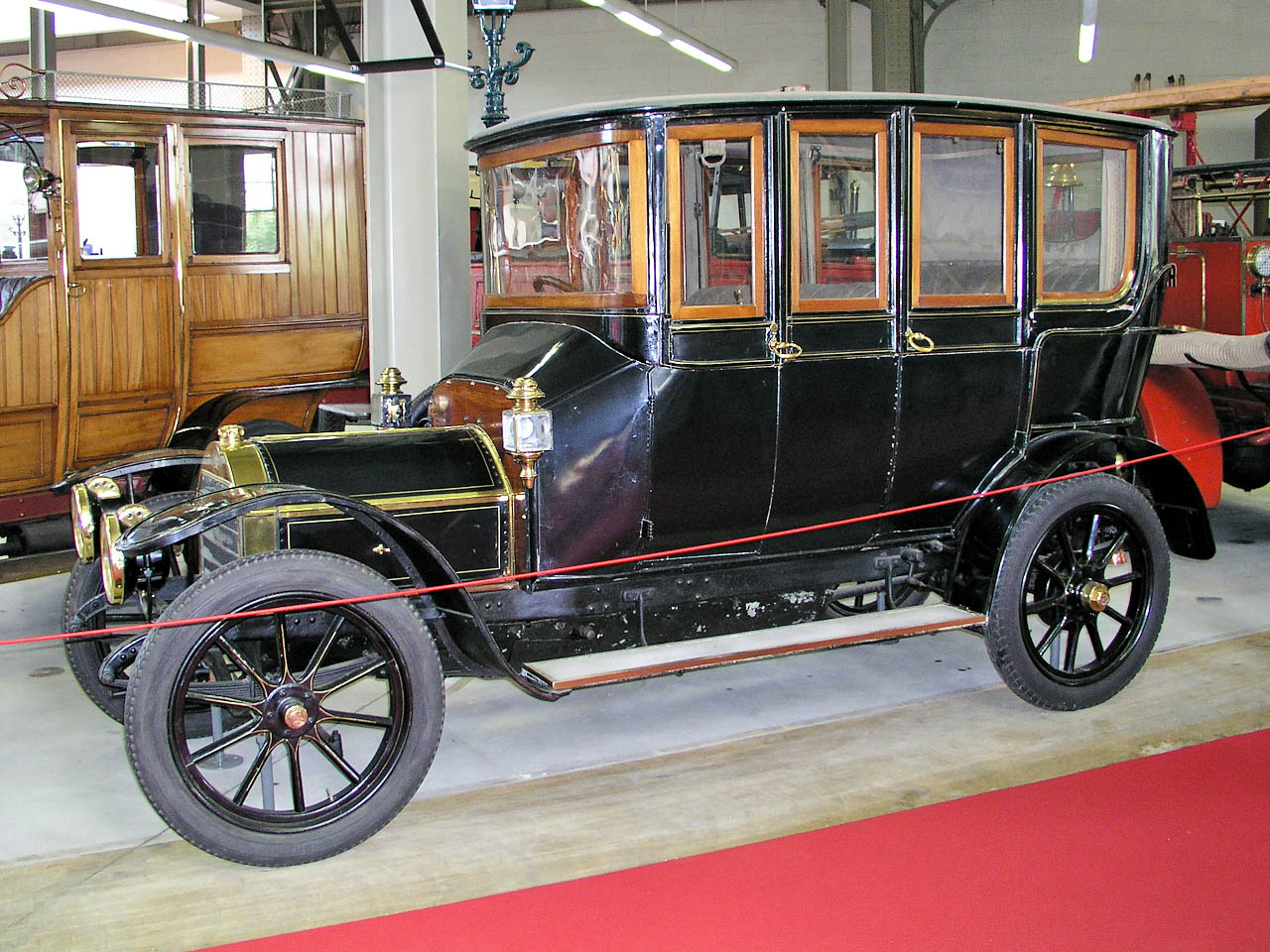
1908 FN 2000 berline with fully enclosed cabin

The berline body style initially carried over from the carriage to the automobile with the chauffeur in the open at the front and an enclosure behind with two seats facing each other as opposed to facing forward. As with the coupé and the brougham, the term evolved with the movement of the driver and controls into an enlarged enclosure, which resulted in turning the front seat to face forward. The term berline is now the French term for the saloon, or sedan.
