= Carriage =

Generally horse-drawn means of transport

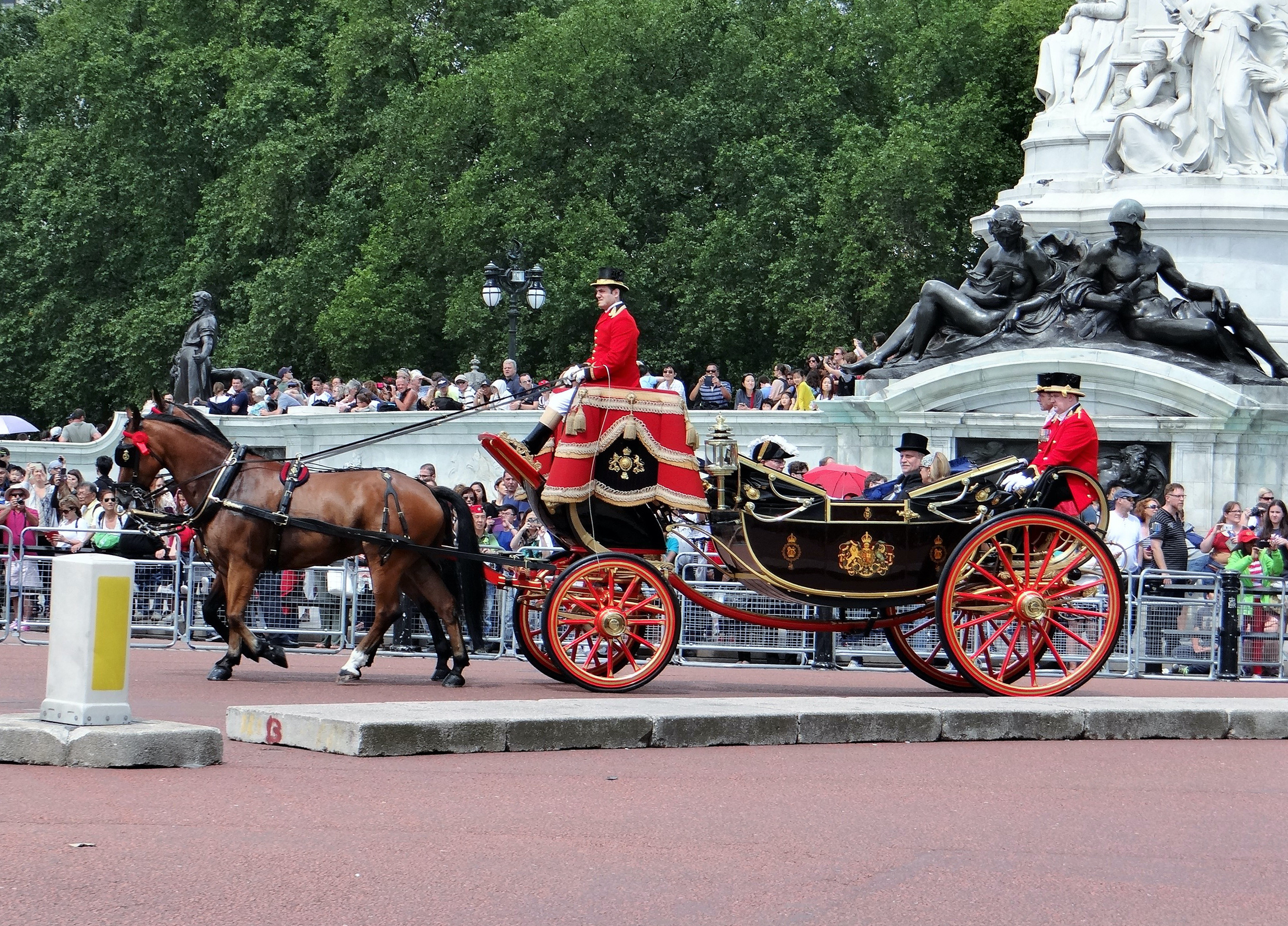
A royal landau outside Buckingham Palace, London

Competitive driving in France

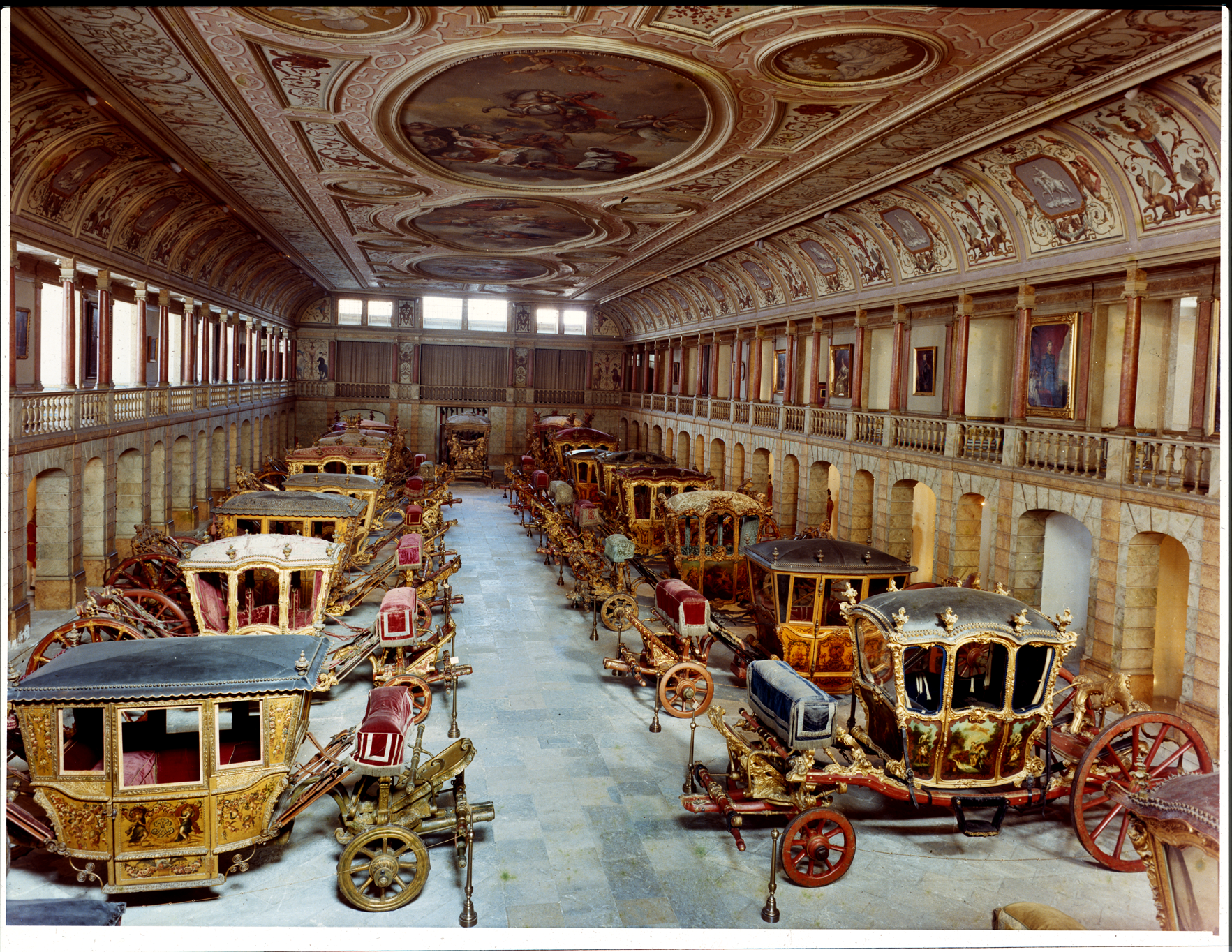
The National Coach Museum in Lisbon, Portugal

A carriage is a two- or four-wheeled horse-drawn vehicle for passengers. Coaches are a special category within carriages; they are enclosed carriages with four corner posts and a fixed roof. From the early modern period until the rise of railways and motor vehicles, carriages were a principal means of road transport, with models ranging from simple vehicles to elaborate ceremonial coaches used by royalty. Although largely replaced by mechanized transport, carriages remain in use for ceremonial occasions, tourism, equestrian sport, and in some communities as everyday transport. Modern carriages have been redesigned and manufactured for sports such as combined driving and for tourist transport.

== Etymology ==
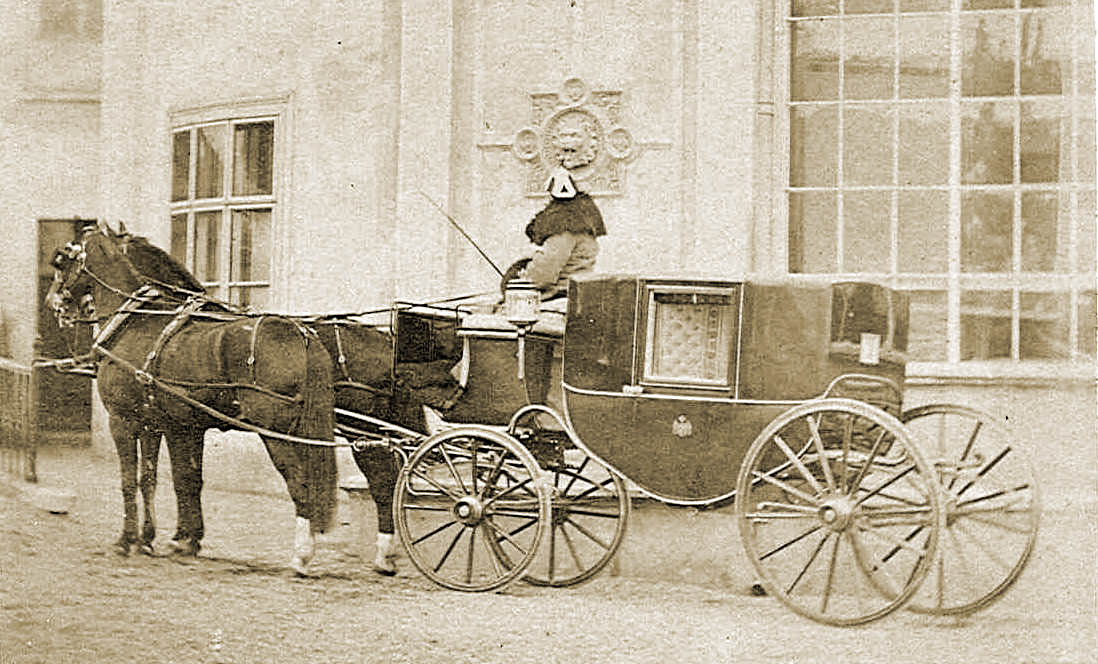
Coach of a noble family, c. 1870

The word carriage is from Old Northern French cariage, to carry in a vehicle. The word car, then meaning a kind of two-wheeled cart for goods, also came from Old Northern French about the beginning of the 14th century (probably derived from the Late Latin carro, a car); it is also used for railway carriages and in the US around the end of the 19th century, early cars (automobiles) were briefly called horseless carriages.

== History ==
From antiquity, wheeled vehicles such as wagons and chariots were used across Eurasia, with archaeological evidence for four-wheeled wagons in Bronze Age Europe and for chariots in China by the late second millennium BCE. These early vehicles established the basic principles of wheel and undercarriage construction that later carriage design would build upon.

By the late medieval period, technical improvements such as the pivoting front axle and suspension on chains made four-wheeled vehicles more maneuverable and more comfortable. Carriages became associated with royalty and aristocrats, often elaborately decorated and drawn by teams of two to four horses.

The development of the coach in the 15th and 16th centuries introduced a lighter, faster form of carriage, most famously associated with the Hungarian town of Kocs. By the late 16th century the coach had spread across Europe and became a standard vehicle for aristocratic and long-distance travel.

From the 17th to the 19th centuries, carriage design incorporated major innovations including steel springs, glazing, and improved steering systems such as the fifth wheel and the principles later formalized as Ackermann steering. These changes made coaches more comfortable, safer, and better suited to long-distance travel.

Carriage use declined rapidly in the 19th century with the spread of railways and later motor vehicles, which displaced horse-drawn transport on both urban and long-distance routes. Carriages remain in limited use for ceremonial purposes, tourism, and by communities that maintain traditional horse-drawn transport.

== Carriage terminology ==
A carriage driver is traditionally called a whip. A professional driver who operates a coach or carriage is known as a coachman. Formal carriages are often attended by those wearing livery, including grooms and footmen, who assist passengers and manage safety while riding on a rear platform or seat. An outrider is someone who rides ahead or alongside a carriage to clear the way or provide security.

A lap robe is a covering to protect the legs and feet of passengers from the weather, while the driver wears an apron to keep grease from the reins off his clothes. A coach horse is heavier than a riding horse, and elegant for driving carriages. Certain dogs, especially Dalmatians, sometimes serve as carriage dogs, running beside or beneath a vehicle to guard parcels and accompany the equipage.

Buildings and facilities associated with carriages include the porte-cochère, a covered entrance allowing passengers to alight under shelter; the carriage house or coach house, used for storing vehicles and harness; and the livery stable, a commercial establishment that boards horses and rents vehicles. A mews is a group of stables and coach houses arranged around a courtyard or street, often with living quarters for staff.

The term carriage trade historically refers to the industries involved in building and maintaining horse-drawn vehicles, including coachbuilders, wheelwrights, trimmers, blacksmiths, and other specialists. In slang usage, carriage trade came to mean affluent people, reflecting the association between wealth and the ownership of private carriages.

== Construction ==
=== Body ===
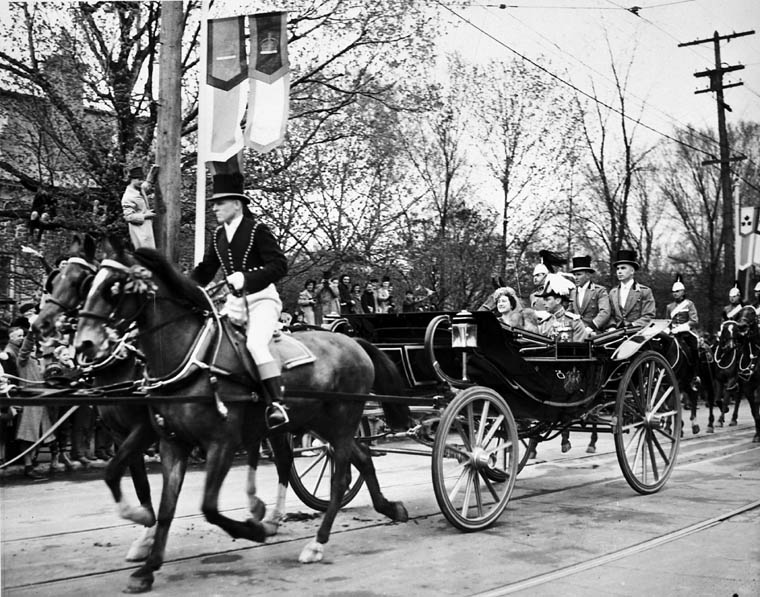
George VI and Queen Elizabeth in a landau with footmen and a postilion, riding on the near wheel horse, controlling two horses. Canada, 1939

Carriages may be enclosed or open, depending on the type. The top cover for the body of a carriage is called the head or hood, and is sometimes flexible and designed to be folded back when desired. Such a folding top is called a bellows top or calash. A hoopstick forms a light framing member for this kind of hood. The top, roof or second-story compartment of a coach was called an imperial. A closed carriage may have side windows called quarter lights (British) as well as windows in the doors, hence a "glass coach". On the forepart of an open carriage, a screen of wood or leather called a dashboard intercepts water, mud or snow thrown up by the heels of the horses. The dashboard or carriage top sometimes has a projecting sidepiece called a wing (British). A foot iron or footplate may serve as a carriage step.

The drivers seat for a coachman was in front of the carriage body, while footmen stood on a footboard or sat on a seat behind the body. If either seat was raised on an iron frame and not built as part of the carriage body, it was given the name of dickey-seat. Originally, the dickey was in the rear, but by the early 1900s the front seat was being called a dickey. A boot was a place for luggage or other storage, and was sometimes built under a driver's or footman's seat, unlike the raised dickey seats. The earliest boots were projections wherein passengers put their feet, hence the name boot. The modern terms for the seat upon which the driver sits are box and box seat, even when the carriage style is owner-driven (Note: "Owner-driven" refers to a carriage style where the driver sits within the main passenger compartment, whereas "coachman-driven" refers to those with a seat located outside of the main passenger compartment, usually in front.) rather than coachman-driven.

Passenger seating in carriages include the following terminology and arrangements:

- A crosswise or transverse seat-board is aligned from the left to right sides of the vehicle; passengers face forward or backwards.
- A longitudinal seat runs lengthwise, front to back.
- The phaeton method arranges crosswise seats for all passengers to face forward. An example is the Surrey.
- The vis-à-vis method of seating has crosswise seats arranged for passengers in the forward seat to face those in the rear seat (face-to-face). Examples includes all coaches, the Landau, and the Vis-à-vis.
- A dos-à-dos seating arrangement has crosswise seats for passengers to sit back-to-back. An example is the Dogcart.
- The jaunting car method has two longitudinal seats placed back-to-back where the passengers face outward. An example is the Jaunting car outside car.
- The wagonette method has two longitudinal seats placed to the outer edge of the vehicle's body so passengers face each other; entry is usually from the rear of the vehicle. Examples include the Wagonette and the Governess cart.

A holdback, consisting of an iron catch on the shafts with a looped strap, enables a horse to back or hold back the vehicle. The end of the tongue of a carriage is suspended from the collars of the harness by a bar called the yoke. At the end of a trace, a loop called a cockeye attaches to the carriage.

In some carriage types, the body is suspended by several leather straps called thoroughbraces or braces which serve as springs.

=== Undercarriage ===
Beneath the carriage body is the undergear or undercarriage (or simply carriage), consisting of the running gear and chassis. The wheels and axles, in distinction from the body, are the running gear. The wheels revolve upon bearings or a spindle at the ends of a bar or beam called an axle or axletree. Most carriages have either one or two axles. On a four-wheeled vehicle, the forward part of the running gear, or forecarriage, is arranged to permit the front axle to turn independently of the fixed rear axle. In some carriages a dropped axle, bent twice at a right angle near the ends, allows for a low body with large wheels. A guard called a dirtboard keeps dirt from the axle arm.

Several structural members form parts of the chassis supporting the carriage body. The fore axletree and the splinter bar above it (supporting the springs) are united by a piece of wood or metal called a futchel, which forms a socket for the pole that extends from the front axle. For strength and support, a rod called the backstay may extend from either end of the rear axle to the reach, the pole or rod joining the hind axle to the forward bolster above the front axle.

A skid called a drag, dragshoe, shoe or skidpan retards the motion of the wheels. A London patent of 1841 describes one such apparatus: "An iron-shod beam, slightly longer than the radius of the wheel, is hinged under the axle so that when it is released to strike the ground the forward momentum of the vehicle wedges it against the axle". The original feature of this modification was that instead of the usual practice of having to stop the carriage to retract the beam and so lose useful momentum the chain holding it in place is released (from the driver's position) so that it is allowed to rotate further in its backwards direction, releasing the axle. A system of "pendant-levers" and straps then allows the beam to return to its first position and be ready for further use.

A catch or block called a trigger may be used to hold a wheel on an incline.

A horizontal wheel or segment of a wheel called a fifth wheel sometimes forms an extended support to prevent the carriage from tipping; it consists of two parts rotating on each other about the kingbolt or perchbolt above the fore axle and beneath the body. A block of wood called a headblock might be placed between the fifth wheel and the forward spring.

=== Wheels ===
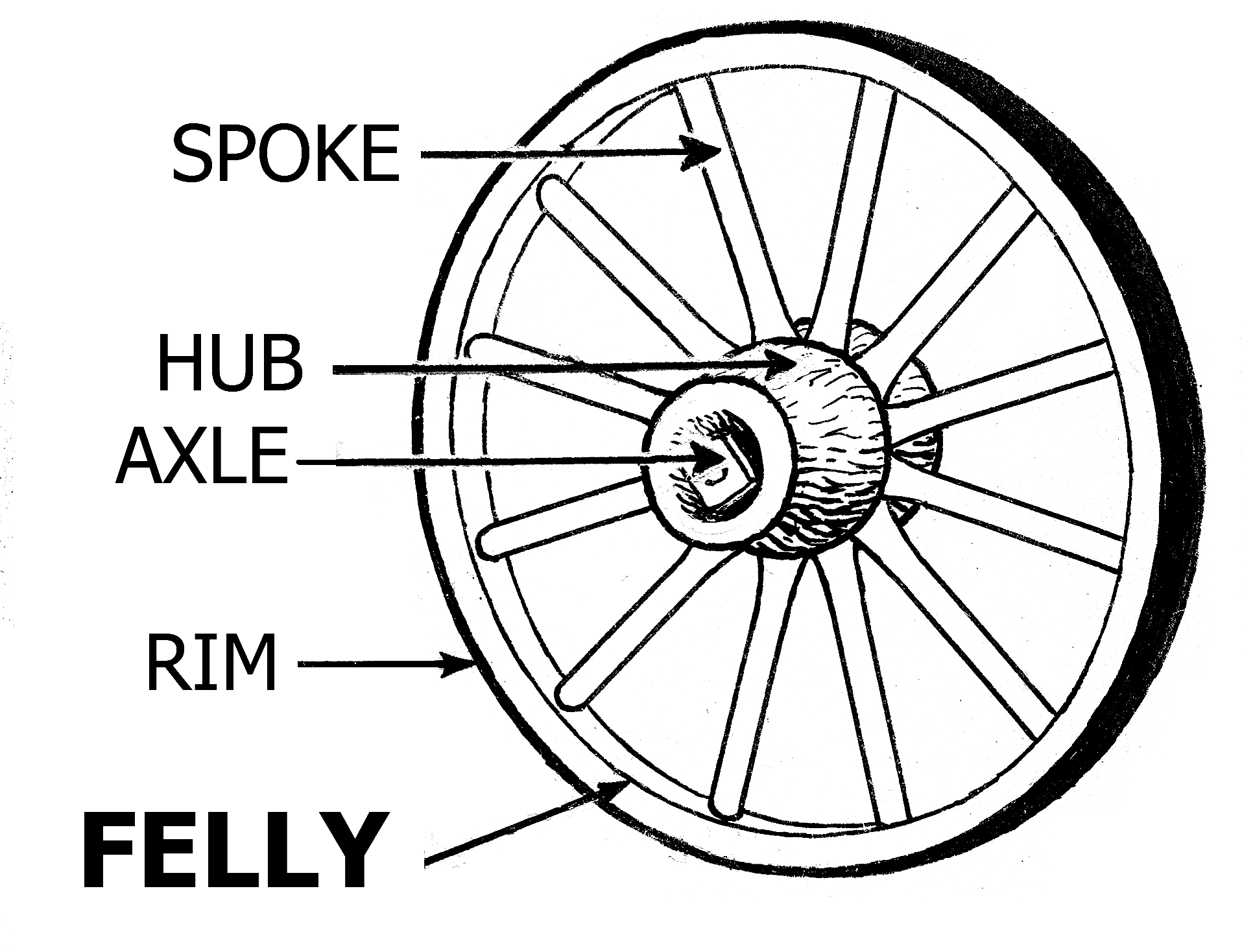
Parts of a wheel

Historically, carriages had wooden wheels. Modern sport carriages such as the marathon carriage have metal wheels with solid rubber tires. Some lightweight carriages, such as horse show sulkies, have wire "bicycle spokes" and pneumatic tires.

The basic parts of a wooden wheel are nave, spokes, felloes, and tyre (tire). The nave is the central block and acts as the hub. Spokes are the pieces that fit into the nave, radiate outwards, and join into the felloes at the outer edge. The felloe is made of several curved segments of wood, pieced together to make the outer circle of the wheel; sometimes spelled "felly". The tyre or tire is a protective strip that goes outside the felloe. The rim is the outer edge of a wheel not counting the tyre, although some refer to the tyre itself as the rim.

=== Fittings, furnishings and appointments ===
Originally, the word fittings referred to metal elements such as bolts and brackets, furnishings leaned more to leatherwork and upholstery or referred to metal buckles on harness, and appointments were things brought to a carriage but not part of it, however all of these words have blended together over time and are often used interchangeably to mean the smaller components or parts of a carriage or equipment. All the shiny metal fittings on a vehicle should be one color, such as brass (yellow) or nickel (white), and should match the buckle color of any harness used with the vehicle. Early bodies of horseless carriages were constructed by coachmakers using the same parts used in carriages and coaches, and some horse carriage terminology has survived in modern automobiles.

"We must not forget that the early railway carriages were basically mail-coaches on iron wheels, and the early motor-cars differed from the horse-drawn wagonette or coupe only in so far that there was no horse tied to it." —László Tarr in The History of the Carriage

- Upholstery: Seats might be upholstered using leather, broadcloth, or plush fabrics. Elegant carriages might have upholstery-lined walls and ceilings, and button-tucked velvet seats trimmed with gold braid.
- Carriage lamps: First used around 1700, oil-powered lamps were used throughout the 1800s, though abandoned in favor of candles in the late 1800s, as oil was messy. Lamps are mounted on lamp brackets and are removable for storage, daily wick trimming, or during daylight hours.
- Boot: Any of several box-like parts of a carriage used for storage of small items. A boot may be found under the coachman's seat, under the passenger's seat, or behind the body of the carriage between the rear wheels. This led to the use of the term boot in British English for the main storage compartment of an automobile.
- Whip socket: Tubular holder for a whip usually mounted on the dashboard or to the right of the driver.
- Whip: A long whip composed of a stiff stick (called the stock), a long flexible thong, and a short lash. The length should be appropriate for the distance from the driver (who is also called a Whip) to the shoulder of the forwardmost horse. With a small pony and cart a whip of overall length of 7 or 8 feet might be appropriate, whereas driving a team of four horses might require an overall length of 17 feet. Driving whips are not "cracked" to make noise, but are a communication aid used by touching the lash on or near the shoulder of the horse.

== Competitive driving ==
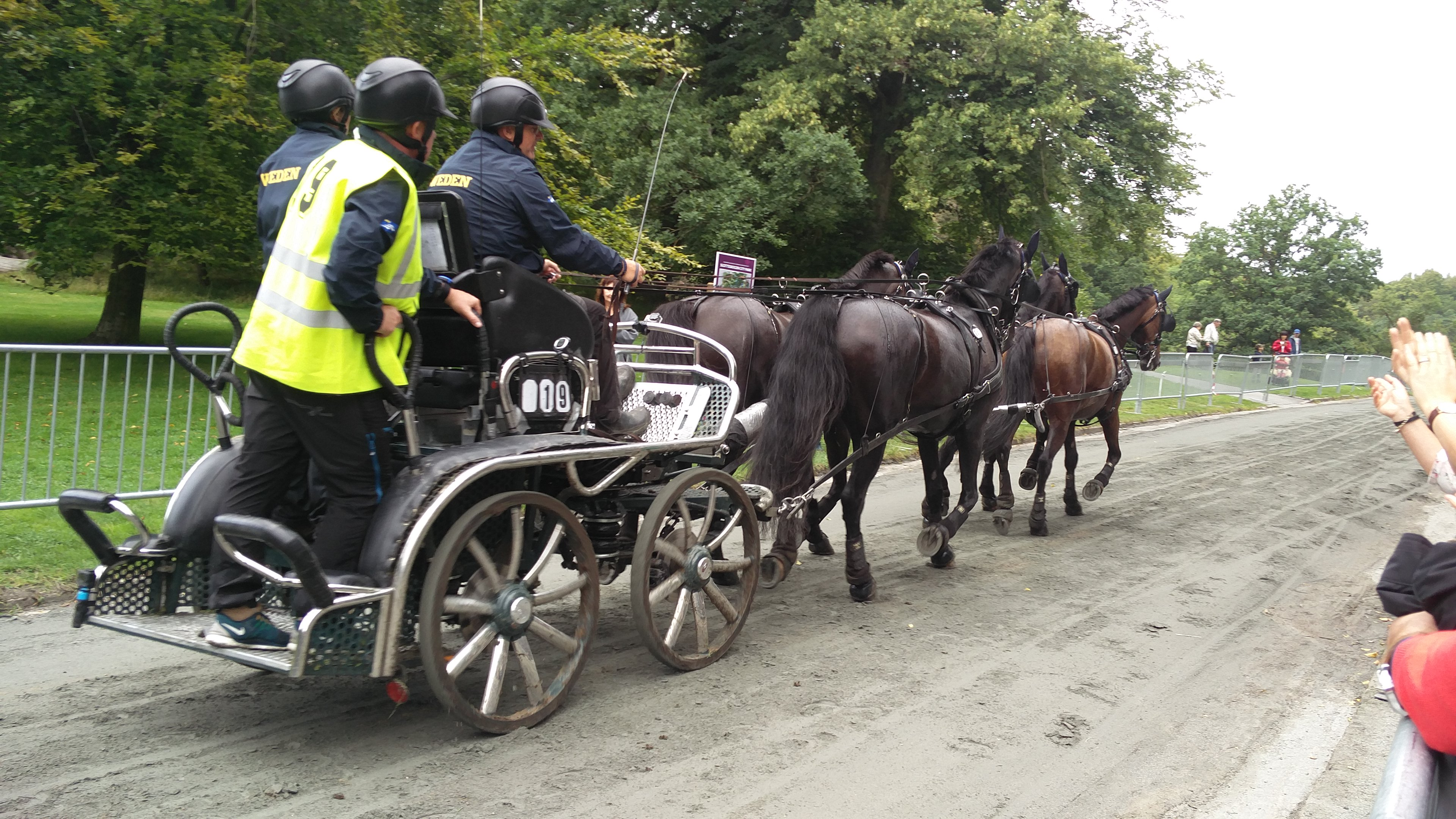
A marathon carriage at the 2017 FEI European Championships

Driving is a competitive equestrian sport. Many horse shows have driving competitions for a particular style of driving, breed of horse, or type of vehicle. Show vehicles are usually carriages, carts, or buggies and, occasionally, sulkies or wagons. Modern high-technology carriages are made purely for competition, often called marathon carriages.

Internationally, there is intense competition in the all-round test of driving called combined driving or horse-driving trials, an equestrian discipline regulated by the International Federation for Equestrian Sports (FEI) with national organizations representing each member country. World championships are conducted in alternate years, including single-horse, horse pairs and four-in-hand championships. The World Equestrian Games, held at four-year intervals, also includes a four-in-hand competition. For pony drivers, the World Combined Pony Championships are held every two years and include singles, pairs and four-in-hand events.

== Types of horse-drawn carriages ==
Numerous varieties of horse-drawn carriages existed, Arthur Ingram's Horse Drawn Vehicles since 1760 in Colour lists 325 types with a short description of each. By the early 19th century one's choice of carriage was only in part based on practicality and performance; it was also a status statement and subject to changing fashions.

Examples of carriages

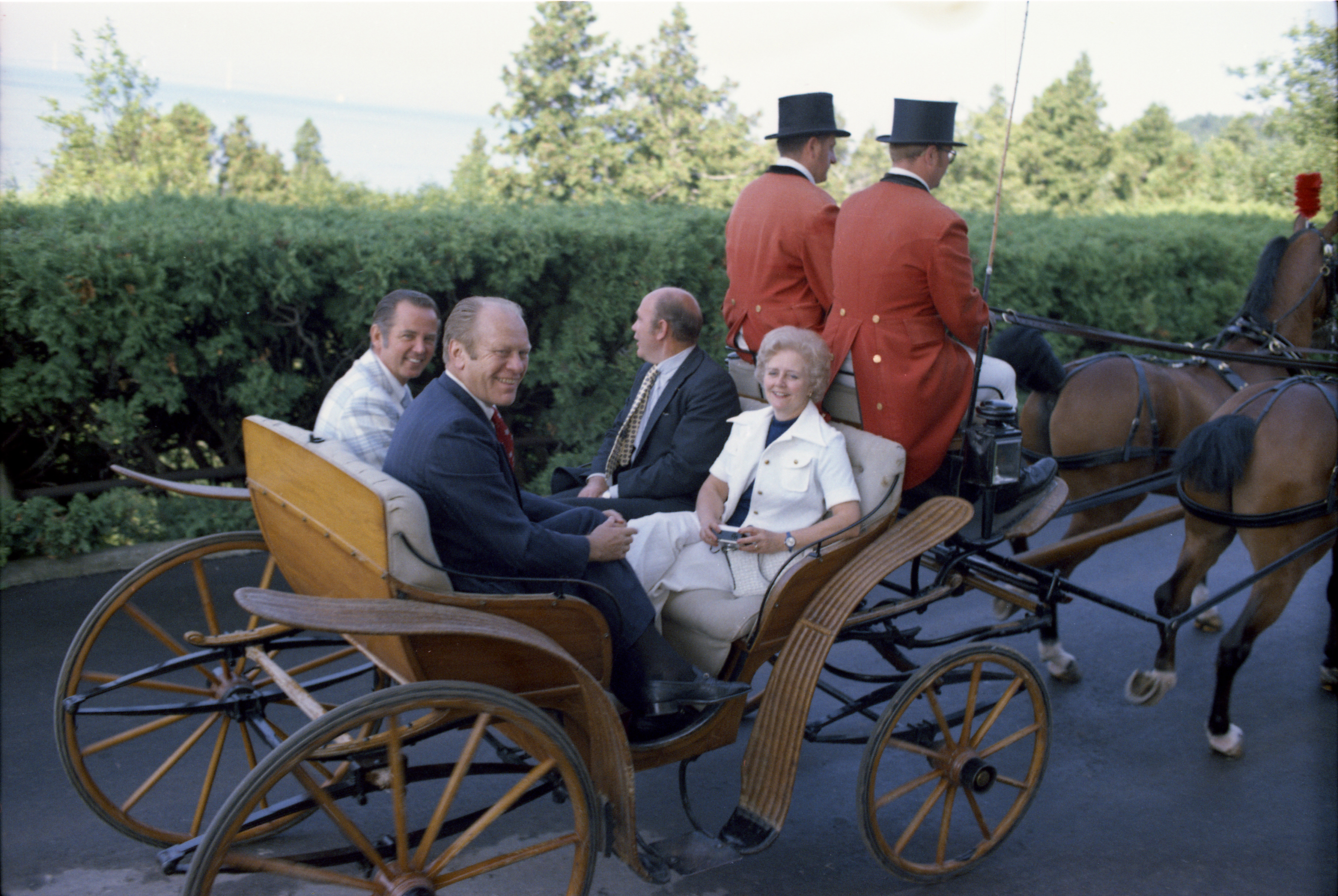
Carriages on Mackinac Island

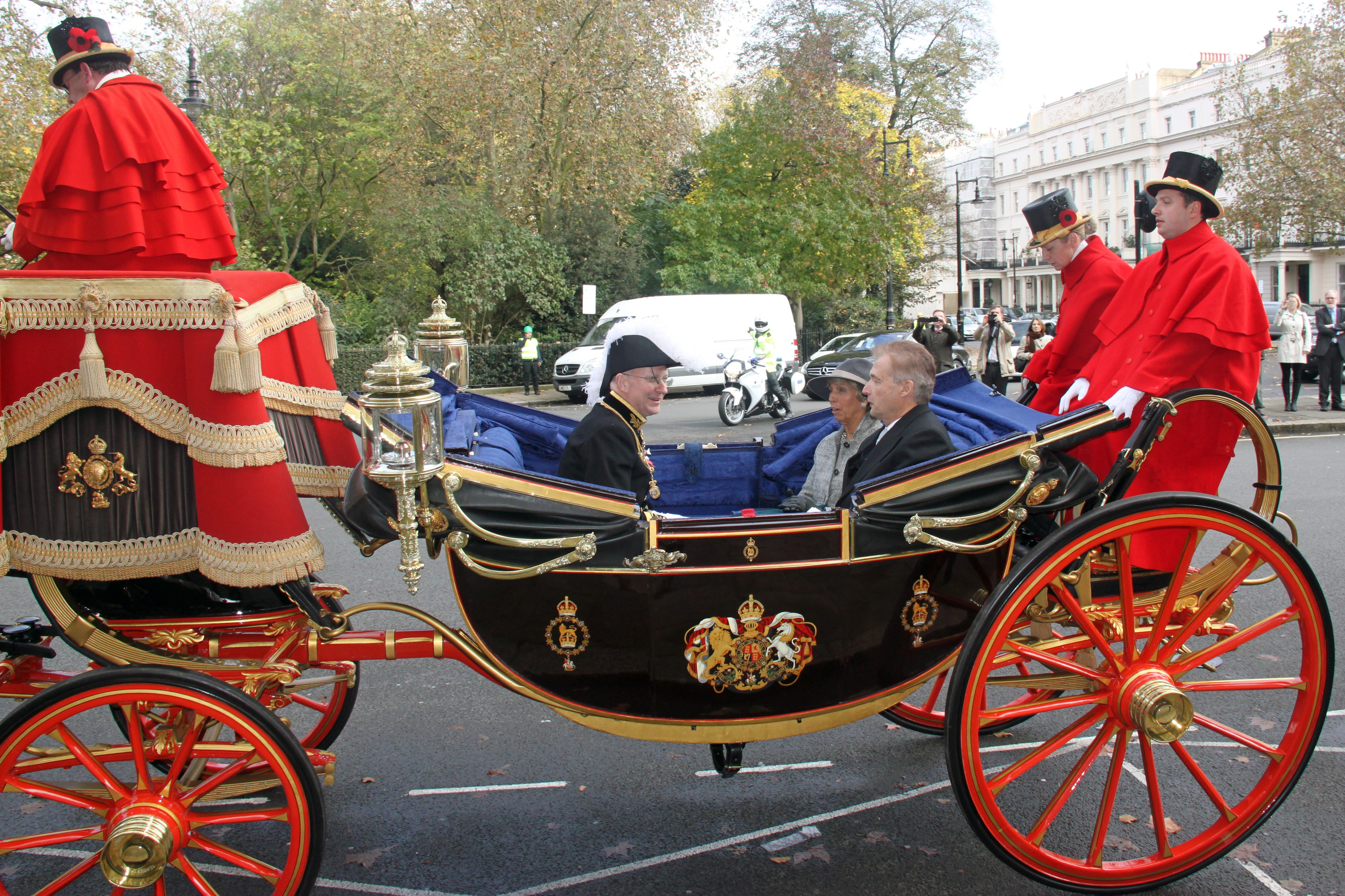
A royal carriage with VIPs

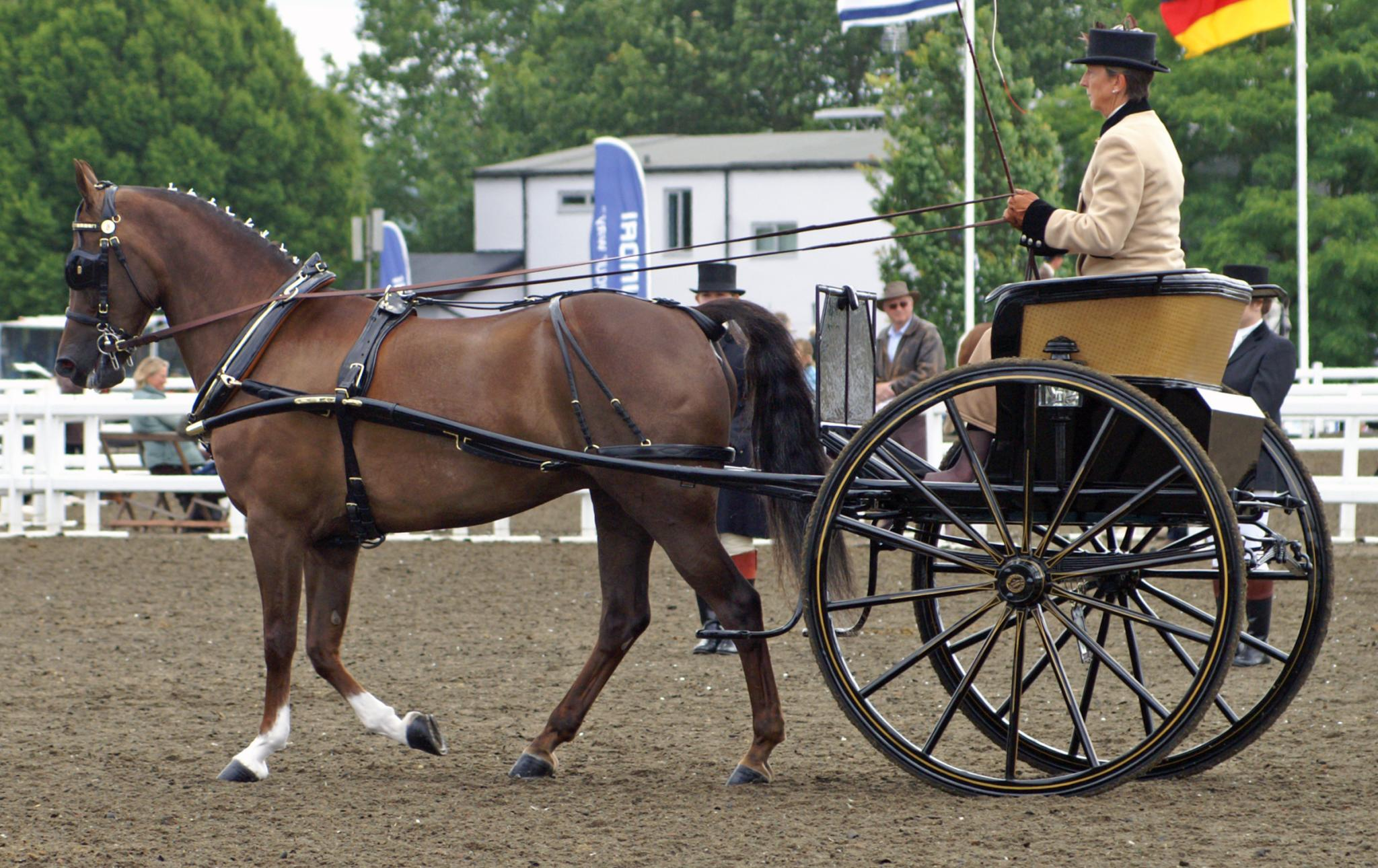
A private carriage at a horse show

== See also ==
- Carriage museums
- Driving (horse)
- Horse harness
- Horse-drawn vehicle
- Glossary of carriage and driving terminology
- Bibliography of carriages and driving
- Glossary of Russian carriages
- Horseless carriage (term for early automobiles)
