= Carriage Association of America =

Horse driving and vehicles

- Location within Kentucky Location within the United States
- Abbreviation: CAA
- Formation: 1960; 66 years ago
- Type: Nonprofit
- Headquarters: 4075 Iron Works Parkway (Building D), Lexington, KY 40511
- Coordinates: 38°09′N 84°31′W
- Services: Memberships, demonstrations, seminars, symposia, competitions, carriage museum tours, research archives
- Publication: The Carriage Journal
- Affiliations: Chapter driving clubs (60 in 2023)
- Website: carriageassociationofamerica.com

The Carriage Association of America (CAA) is a nonprofit organization dedicated to the history and traditions of carriage driving, and the preservation and restoration of horse-drawn carriages and sleighs. It is headquartered at the Kentucky Horse Park along with its sister organization, the Carriage Museum of America (CMA).

== Carriage Association of America ==
CAA is a membership organization for those interested in carriages and horse-drawn vehicles. The CAA maintains directories of carriage collections, carriage museums, museums with carriage collections, and driving and carriage clubs. They organize tours, driving events, educational seminars, and symposia. Since 1963 the association has published the magazine The Carriage Journal approximately five times a year. They maintain a video library on driving, training, carriages, horses, and related events.

== Carriage Museum of America ==
CMA was started in 1978 as a nonprofit educational institution. As of 2023, the organization functioned as a non-circulating research library, preserving the history of the carriage era and serving as an authoritative resource about animal-drawn vehicles. They maintained a collection of around 1,500 historic and contemporary books, periodicals, trade journals, collections of photographs, carriage company catalogs, carriage blueprints, and business records. The CMA maintained a carriage collection of rare and unusual vehicles, preserved in original condition for research purposes, but which were not on display.

CMA published many books, historical and contemporary. For example, its book Conservation and Restoration of Horse-Drawn Vehicles (2007) is a practical manual that covers such subjects as varnishes, wheels, upholstery, and tools for restoring or conserving "irreplaceable historical artifacts".

=== Dissolution of CMA ===
CMA had been operating as a sister organization to CAA, operating out of the same building and with the same personnel. In 2022, the Carriage Association of America Foundation (CAAF) was created to be a 509(a)(3) supporting organization for CAA, and to receive the assets of the CMA. CMA's library and research programs were transferred to CAA.

== History ==
With the advent of the automobile, private carriage driving declined and driving clubs closed down. Though some pleasure driving continued at the National Horse Show, World War II effectively marked the end of carriage driving. Mrs. Lilian Baker Carlisle, who worked with the carriage collection at Shelburne Museum, had contacted Ward Melville, a collector who started the Long Island Museum of American Art, History, and Carriages about forming an organization for collectors and enthusiasts. In 1960, Melville invited twelve other carriage collectors to meet in New York, and the Carriage Association of America was founded "to save what relics remained of the horse-drawn era" and "to preserve the techniques of driving and the proper use of horses in harness". Melville was named pro tem president, and in 1962 CAA incorporated with Sidney Lathem elected as president.

Early CAA publications included The Jung Carriage Lamp and The Coachman's Horn. The Carriage Journal was first published in 1963 as a quarterly magazine and remains the CAA's journal today. The first CAA offices were in Maine, later at John Seabrook's farm in New Jersey, and in 2005 moved to the Kentucky Horse Park.

== Select works ==
- Carriage & Harness Identification Manual. Carriage Association of America. 2000. OCLC 54680789.
- Conservation and Restoration of Horse-Drawn Vehicles. Carriage Museum of America. 2007. OCLC 953230380.
- The Coson Carriage Collection at Beechdale. Carriage Association of America. 1989. OCLC 21311481.
- Working Drawings of Horse-drawn Vehicles: From the collection of the Carriage Museum of America. Carriage Museum of America. 1998. ISBN 9781880499061.
- World on Wheels: Studies in the Manufacture, History, Use, Conservation, and Restoration of Horse-drawn Vehicles. Carriage Association of America. 2009. OCLC 879573785.

== See also ==
- Driving club
- List of carriage museums
