= Driving (horse) =

Use of horses to pull vehicles or equipment

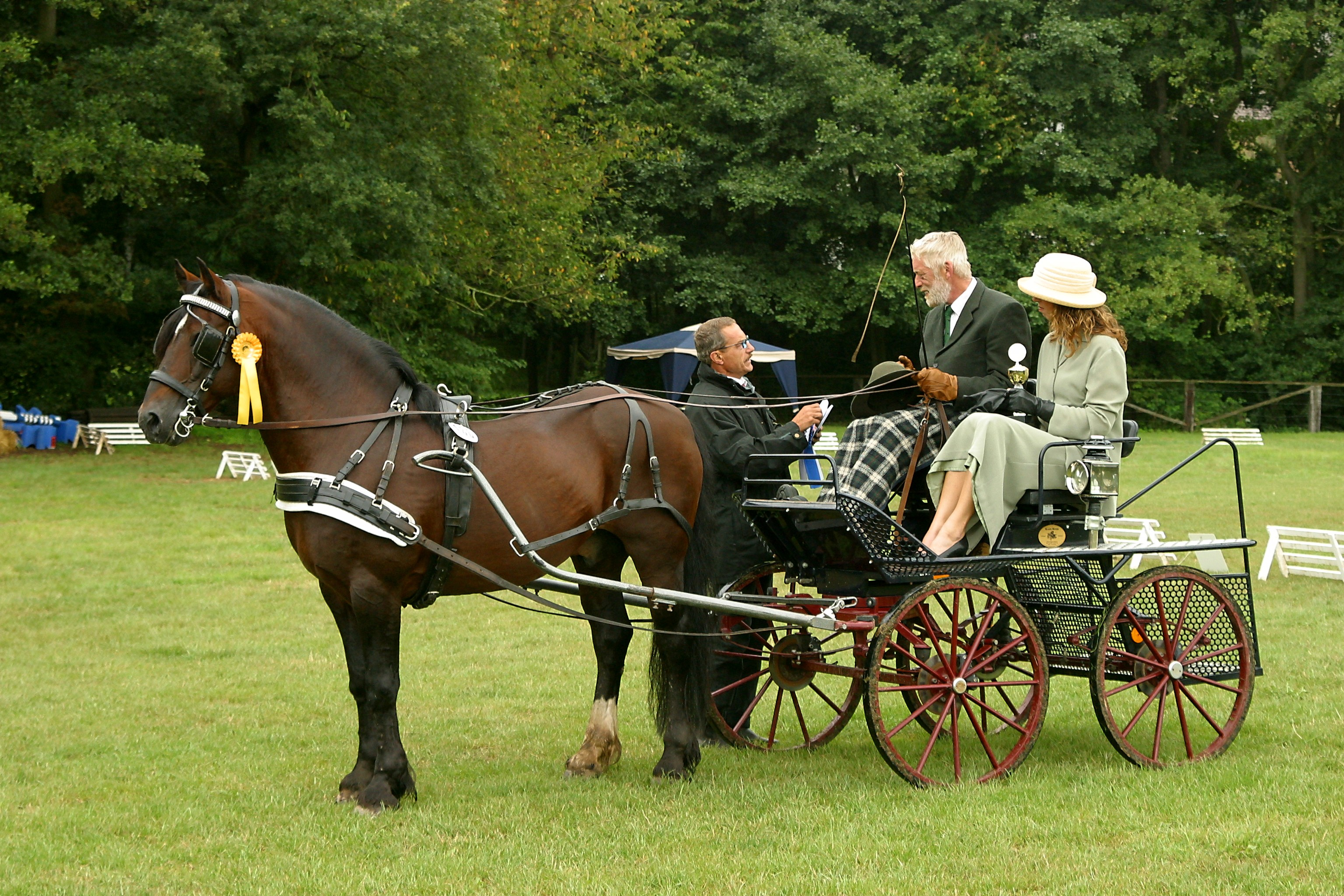
A horse in harness with a modern sport carriage

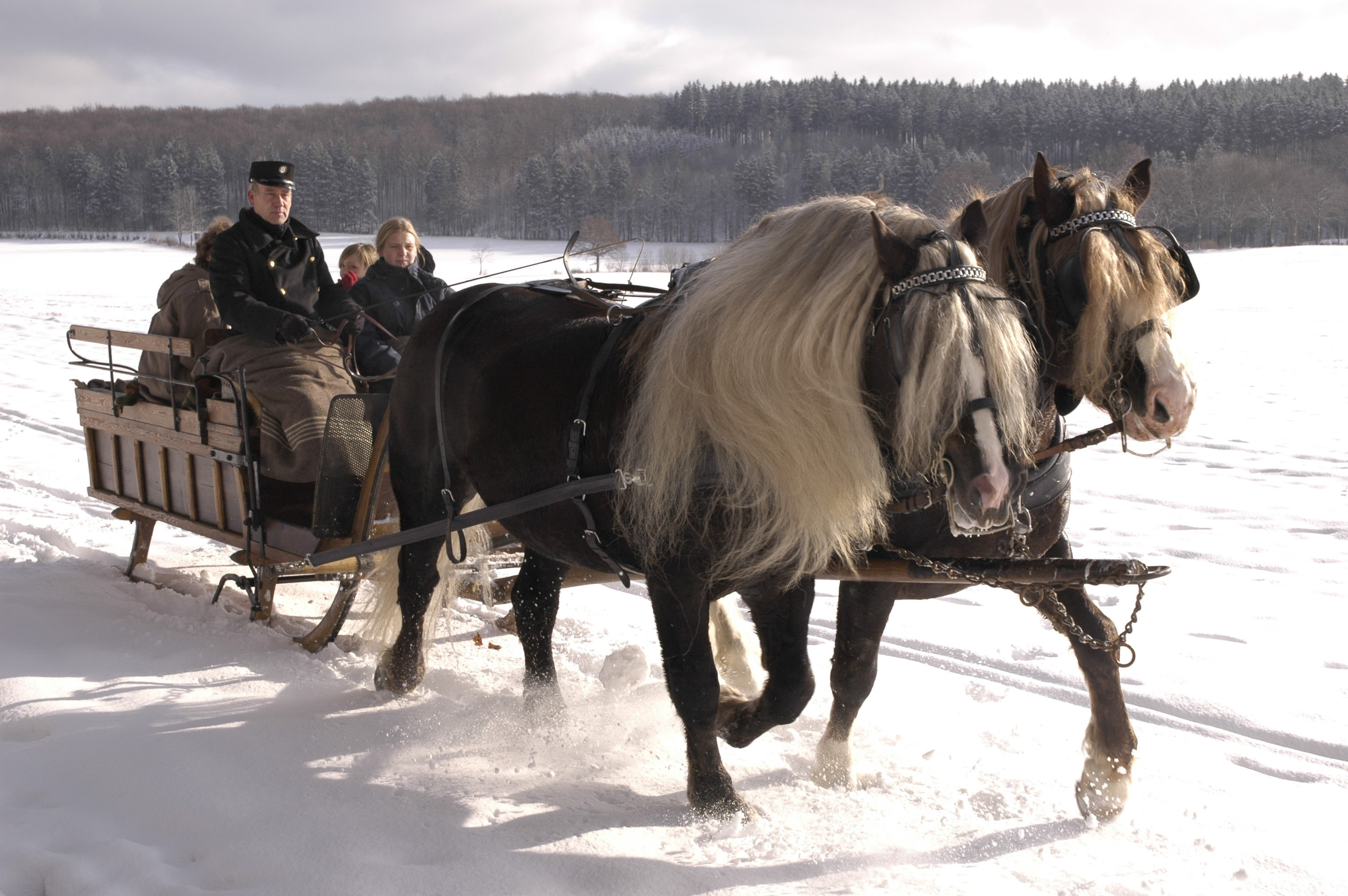
Driving two horses to a sleigh

Driving is the practice of guiding a horse or other draft animal in harness to pull a load. Horses may draw vehicles such as wagons, carts, carriages, coaches, and sleighs, as well as farm implements or other equipment. They are driven for transportation, ceremonial and tourist uses, pleasure, sport, and a variety of working tasks including logging, plowing, and towing boats. Training for driving often begins with ground driving, in which a handler works the animal from behind or alongside.

== Driving configurations ==
Horses are hitched (US) or put to (UK) a vehicle in various configurations which are given names such as single, pair, tandem, unicorn, four-in-hand, team, etc. A hitch (US) or a turnout (UK) are used to describe the entire horse-plus-vehicle arrangement.

The most common arrangements are single, pair and team.

- Single: One horse in shafts
- Pair: Two horses side by side (sometimes called a team in US agricultural style driving)
- Team or four-in-hand: A pair with a second pair in front
Common driving arrangements

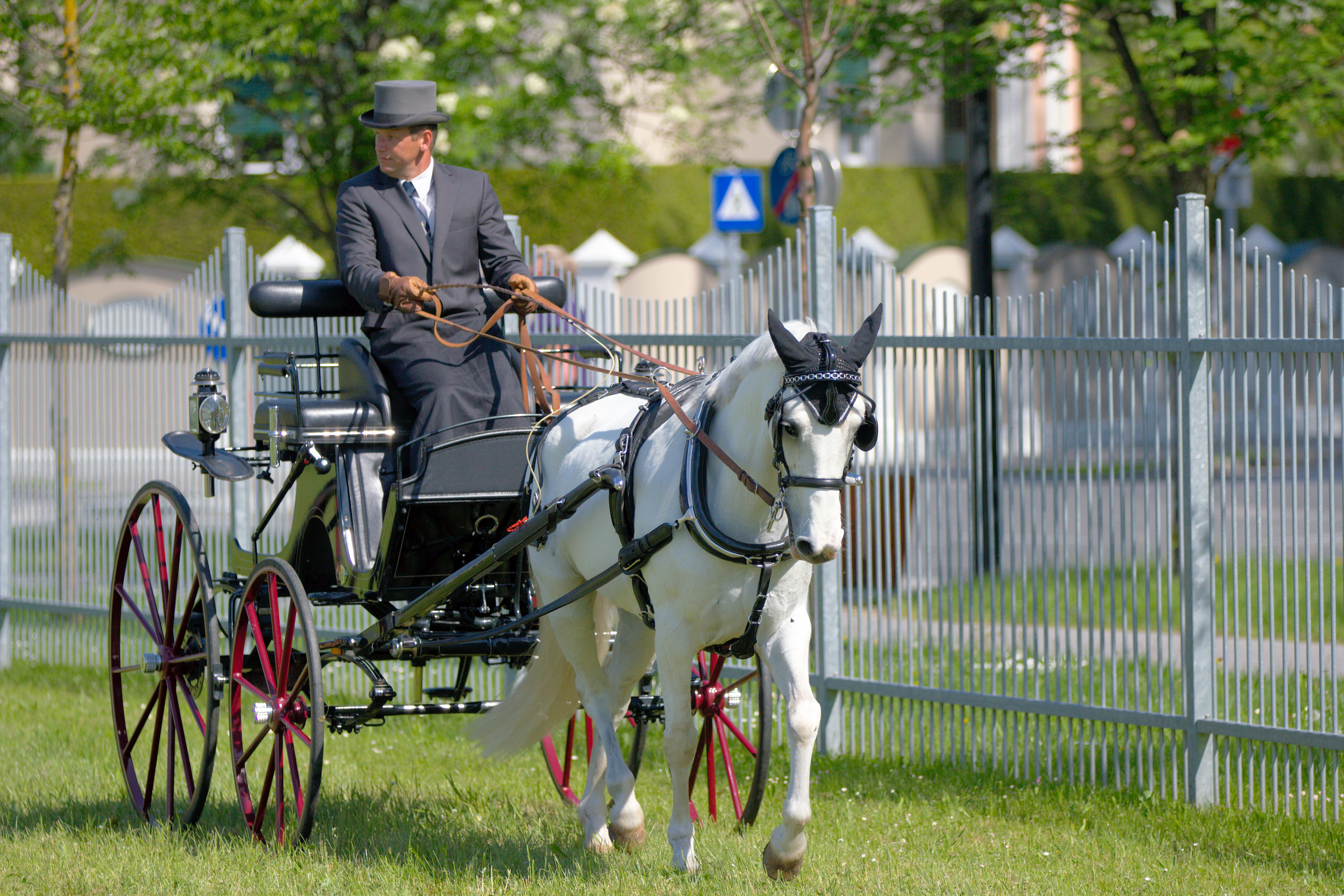
Single

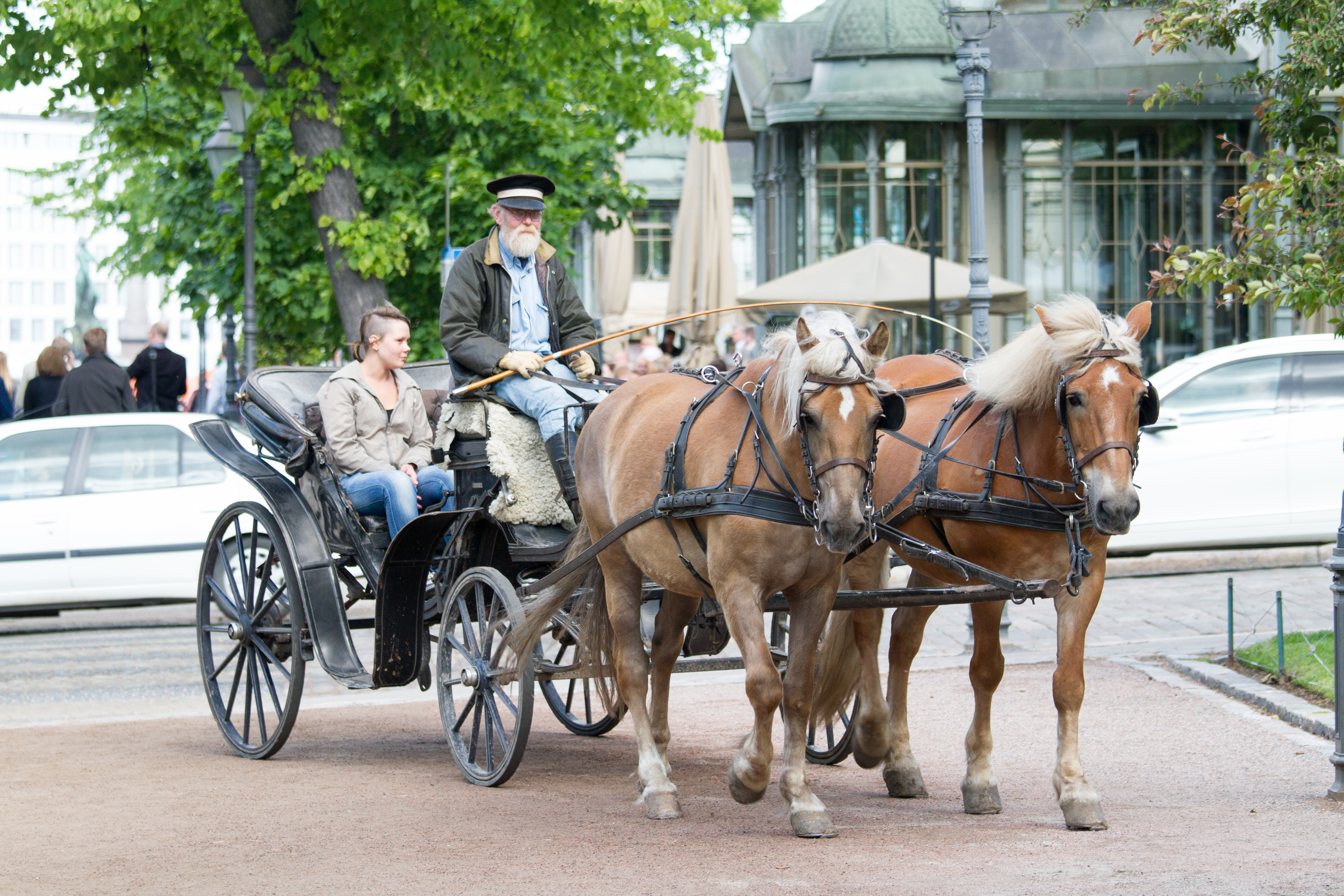
Pair

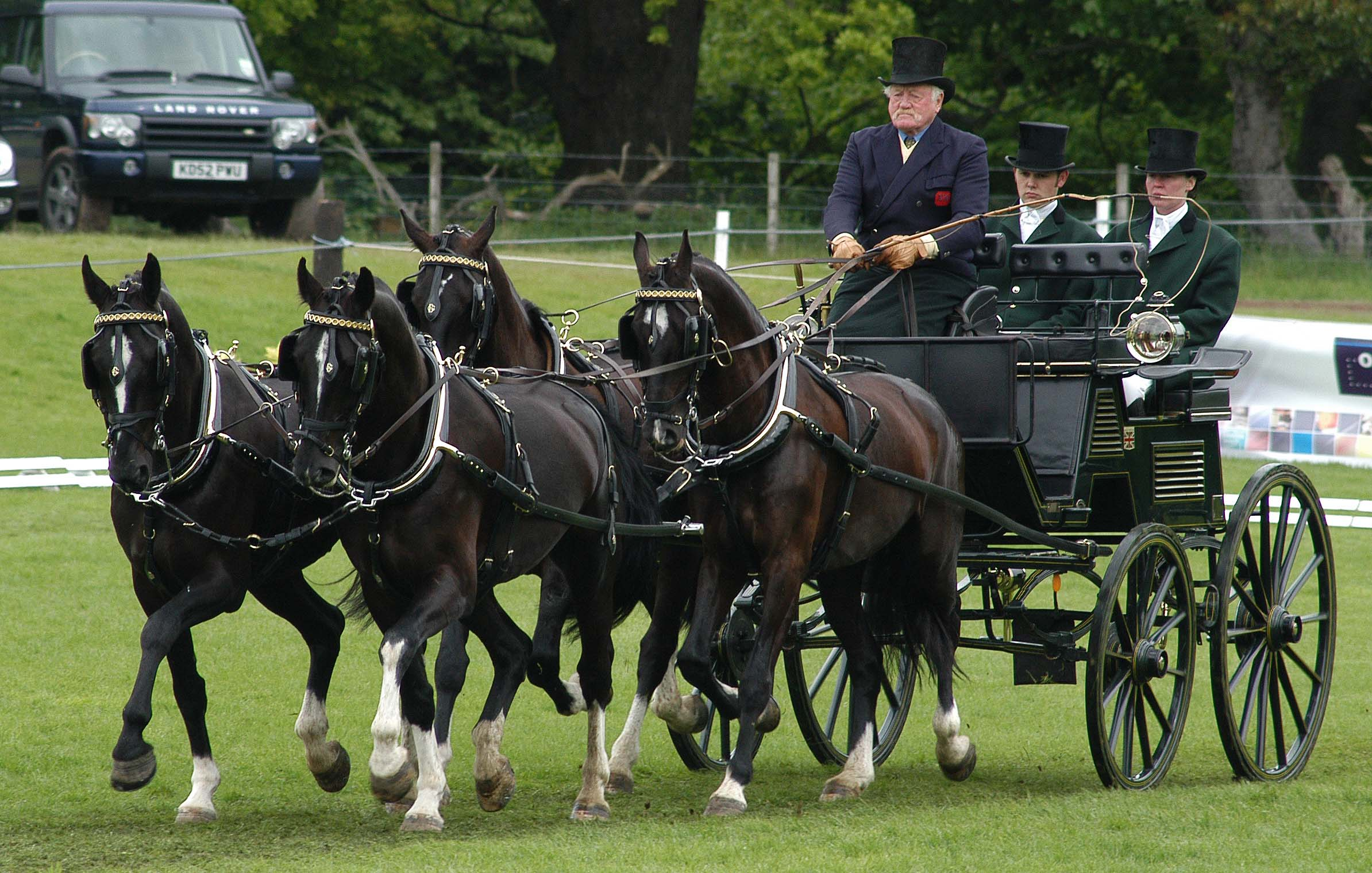
Four-in-hand

Less common arrangements include:

- Tandem: Two horses in single file
- Randem: Three horses in single file
- Trandem or three abreast: Three horses side by side
- Unicorn: A pair with a third horse in front
- Pick axe: A pair of horses with three abreast in front
- Six-horses, eight-horses, and more: Any number of pairs of horses, each pair in front of the other. For heavier loads, more pairs can be added in front to make 6, 8, 10, or even more horses in a hitch, such as the eight-horse hitches of the Budweiser Clydesdales and the Twenty-mule teams of Death Valley.
Other driving arrangements

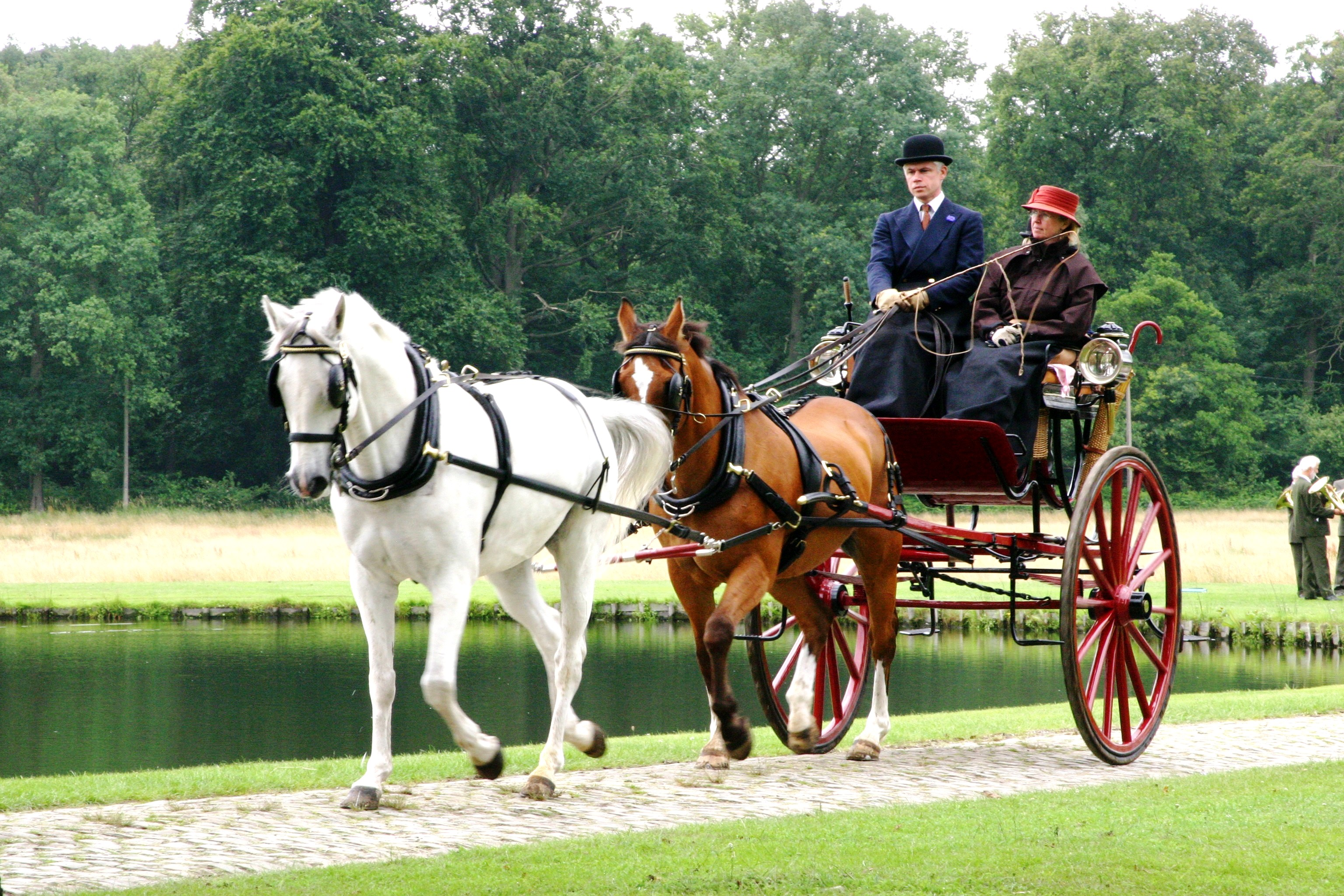
Tandem

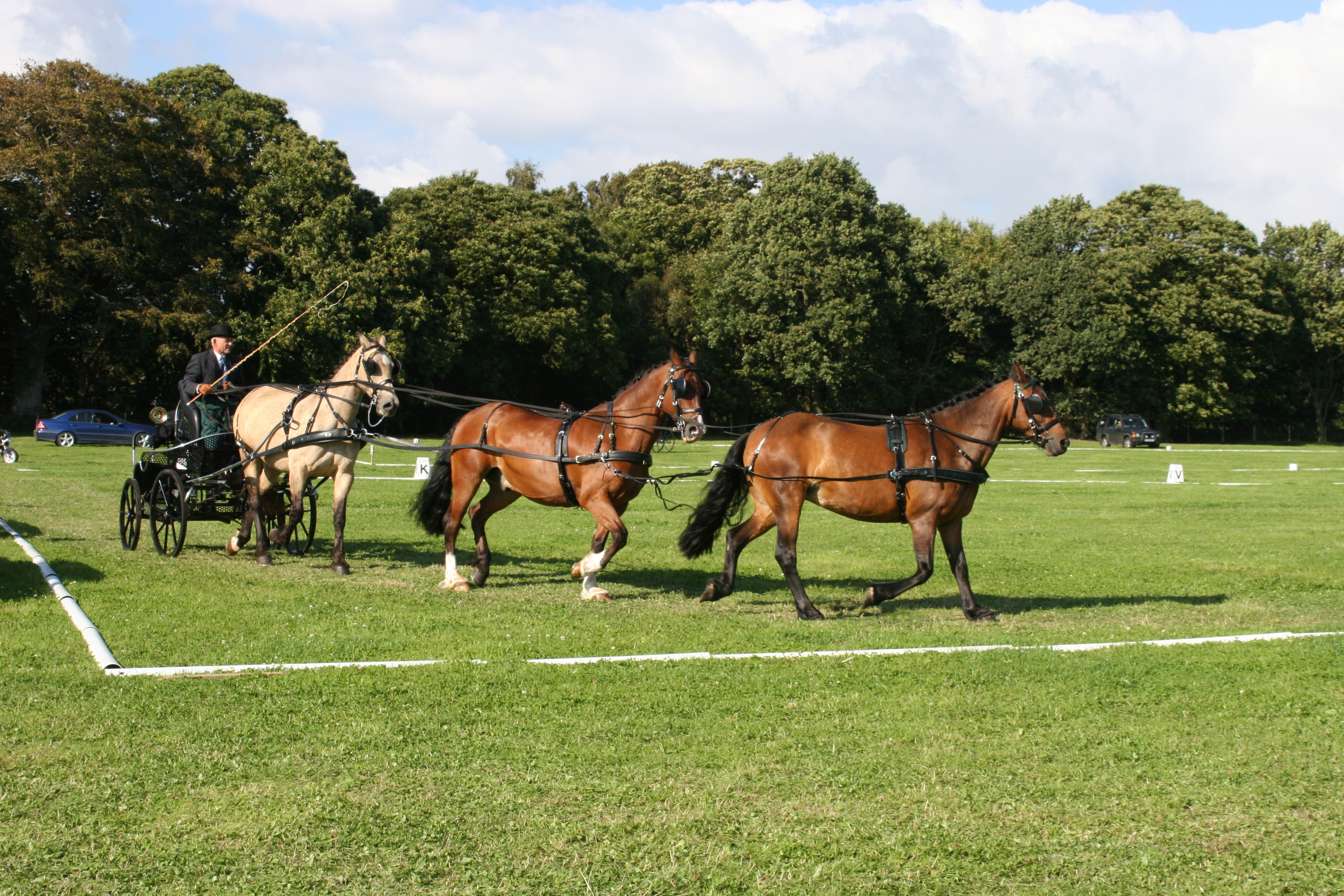
Randem

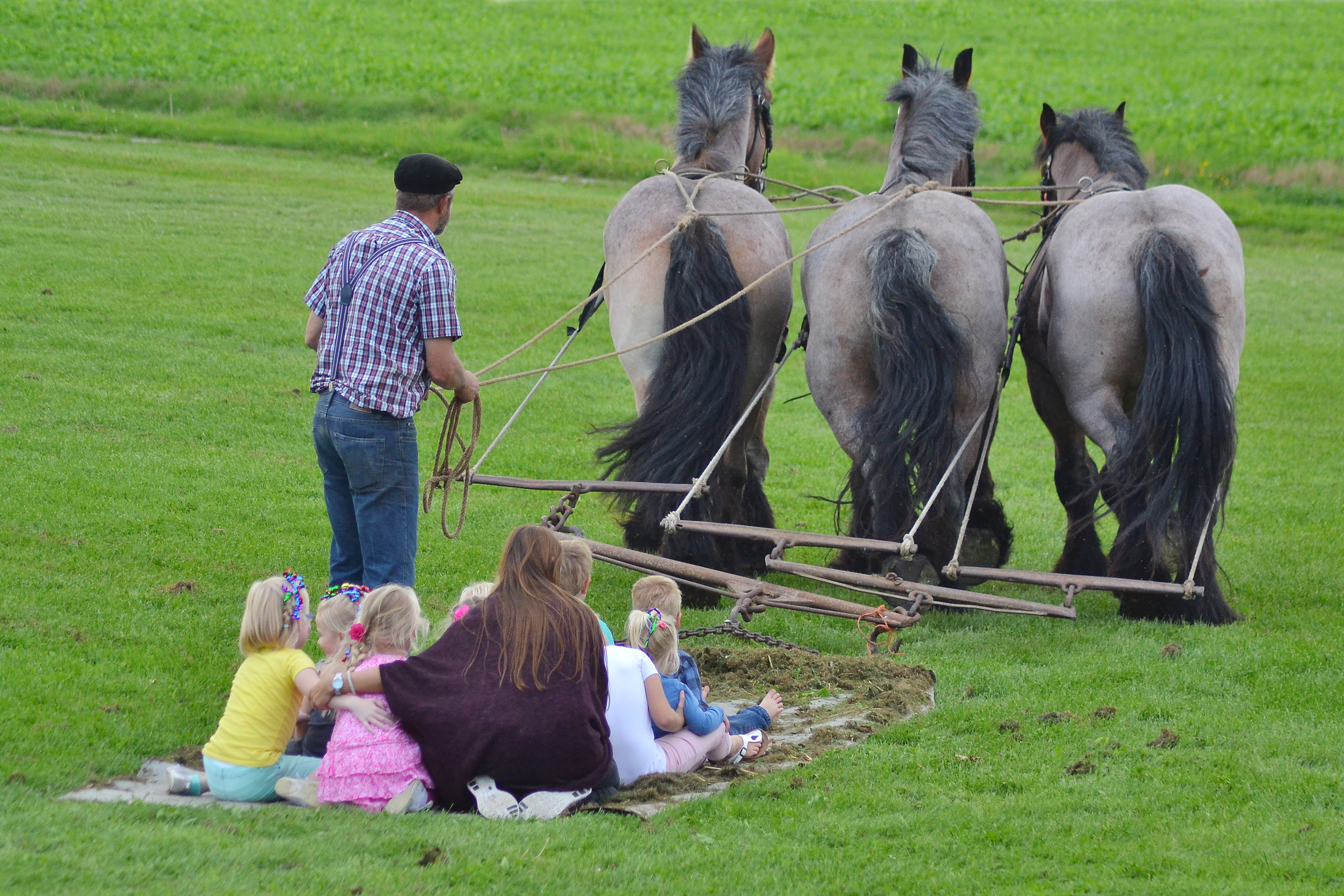
Three abreast

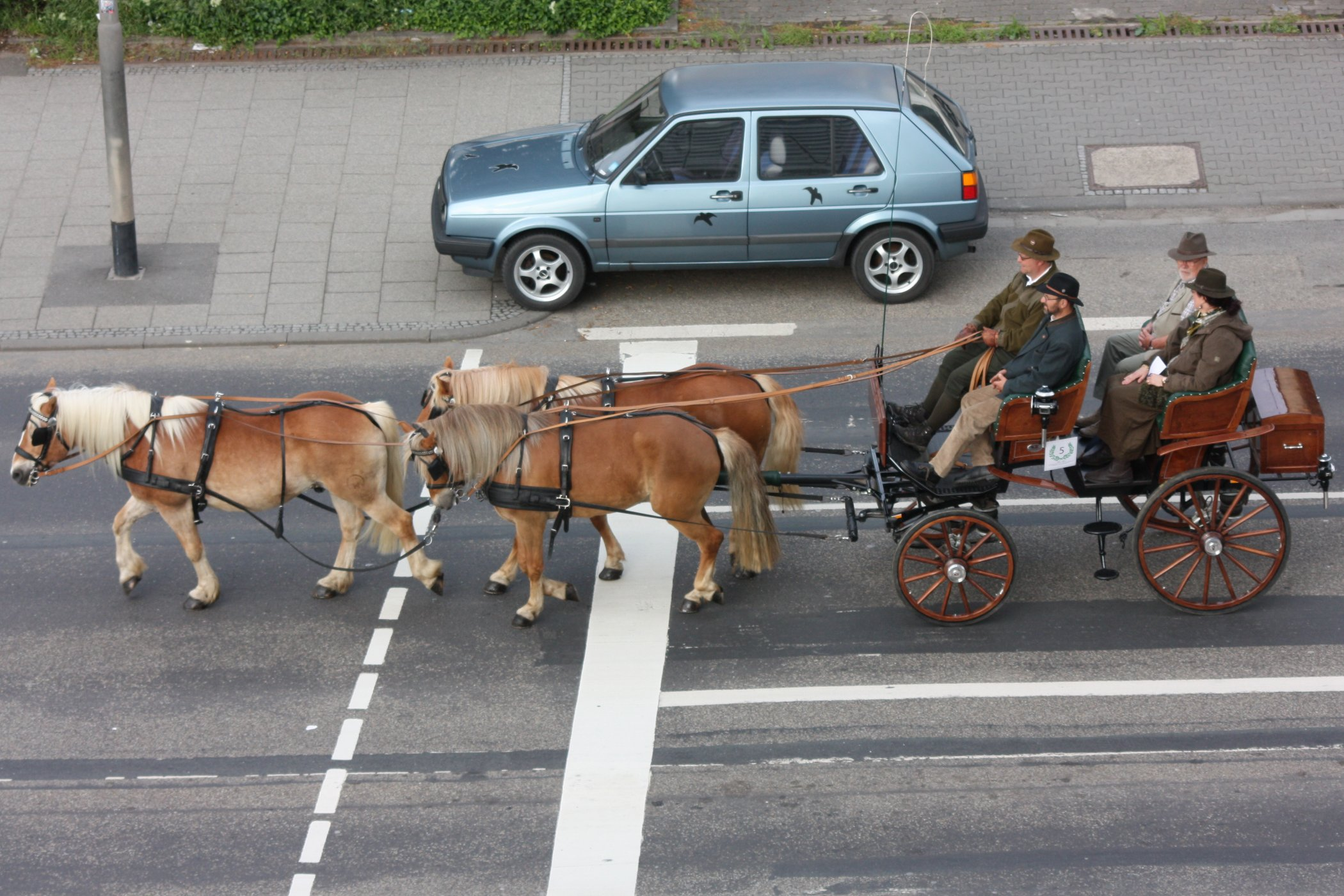
Unicorn

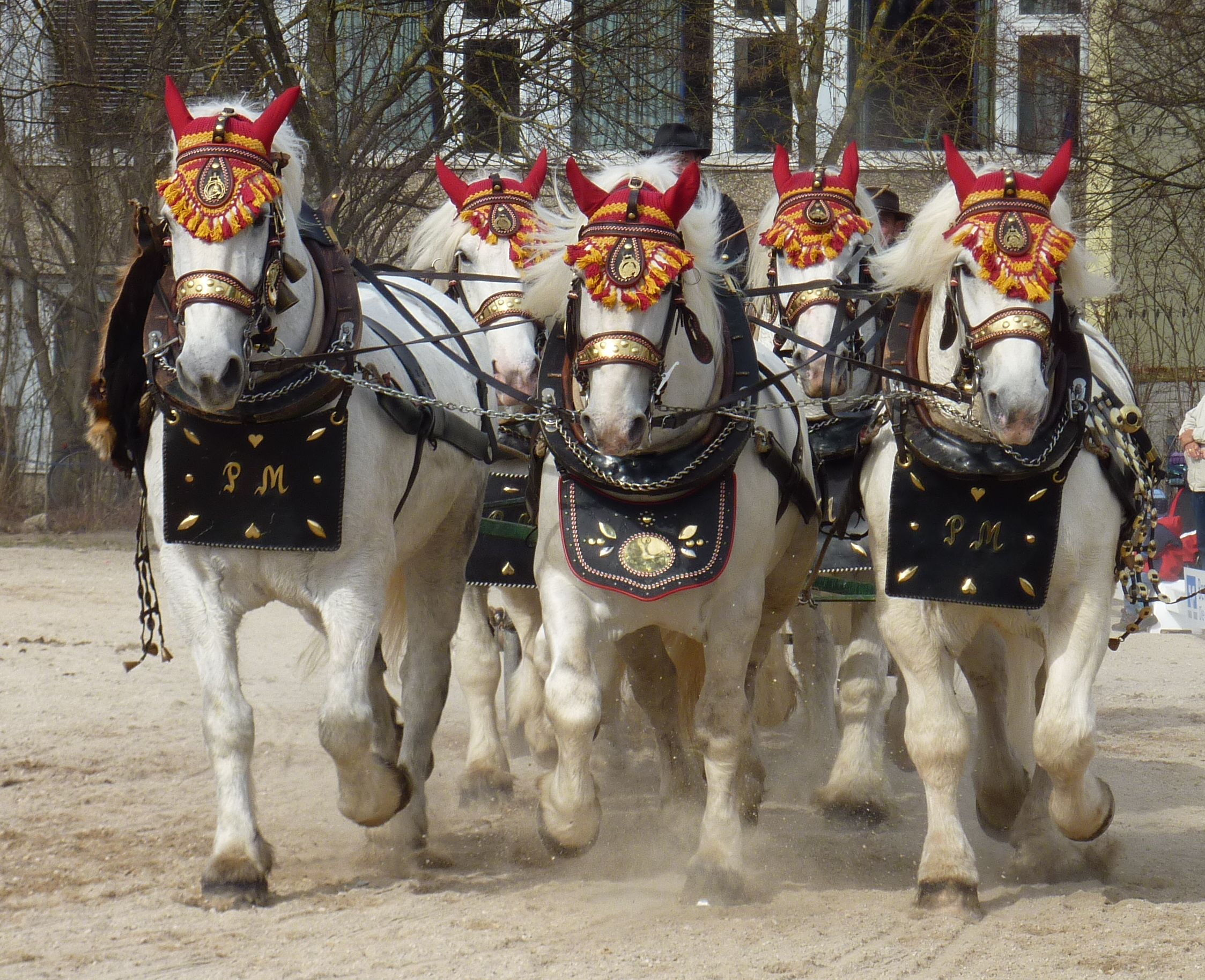
Pickaxe

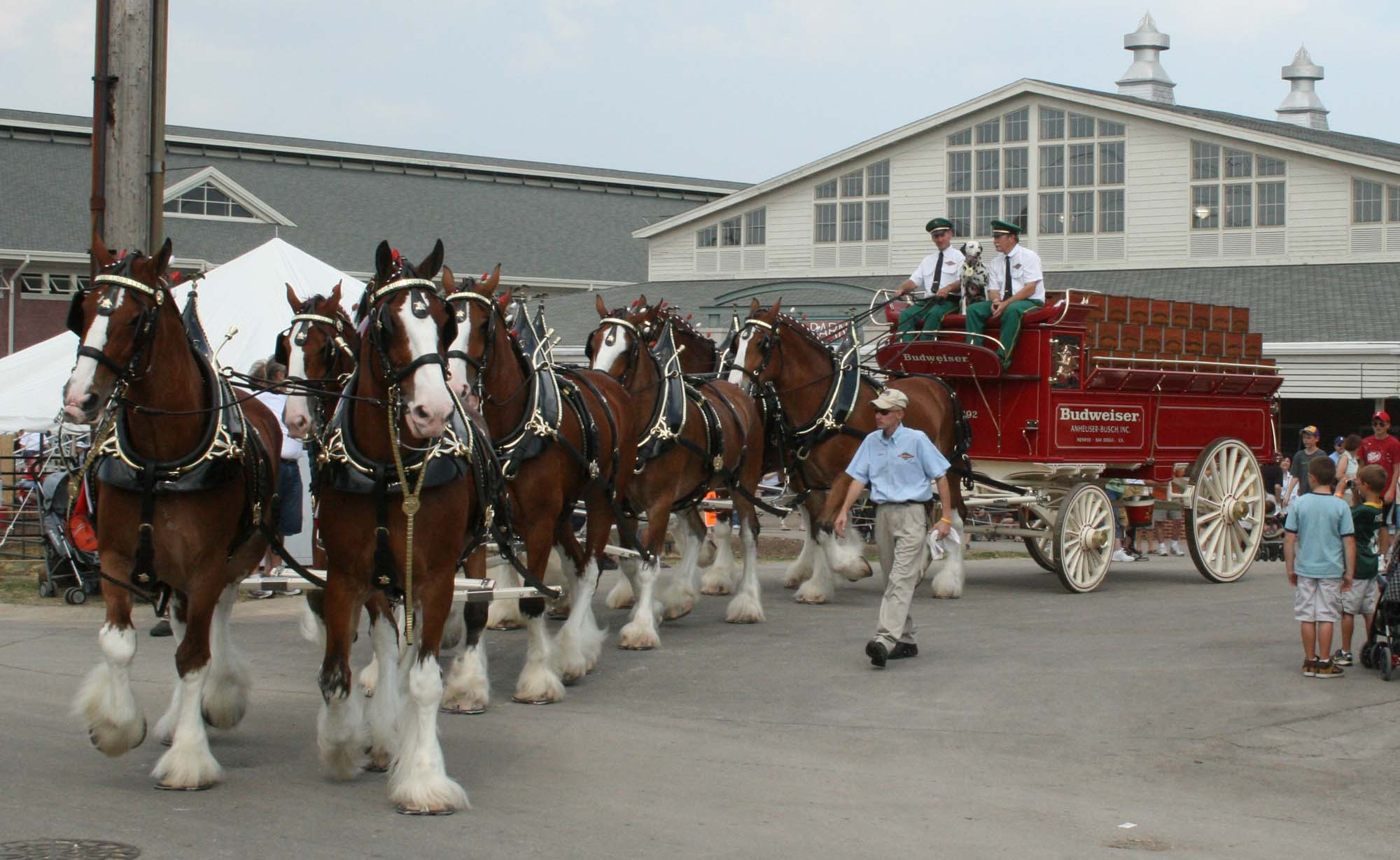
Eight-horse hitch

A rearmost single horse is placed in shafts, whereas the rearmost pair of horses has a pole between them. Shafts and poles are part of the structure of the vehicle and are used for turning the vehicle. The foremost horses are called leaders. The rearmost horses are called wheelers which are responsible for turning, slowing, and stopping the vehicle; horses in front of them are for pulling only.

With pairs, the reins are branched so that the driver holds just two reins: one rein leads to the left of both horses, and the other leads to the right of both horses. When more pairs are added to the hitch, each pair adds another two reins to hold. For example, the driver of a six-horse hitch holds six reins.

Wheelers and leaders in a team usually have somewhat different harness: wheelers usually have breeching so they can pull back on the shafts or pole; leaders do not need breeching, nor do animals pulling a dragged load such as a plow. Wheelers may not need breeching in very light vehicles or those with efficient brakes. Historically, very heavy loads were sometimes controlled downhill by additional pairs hitched behind the vehicle. Such additional pairs were often hired to passing vehicles to help them up or down a particularly steep hill.

=== Four-in-hand driving ===
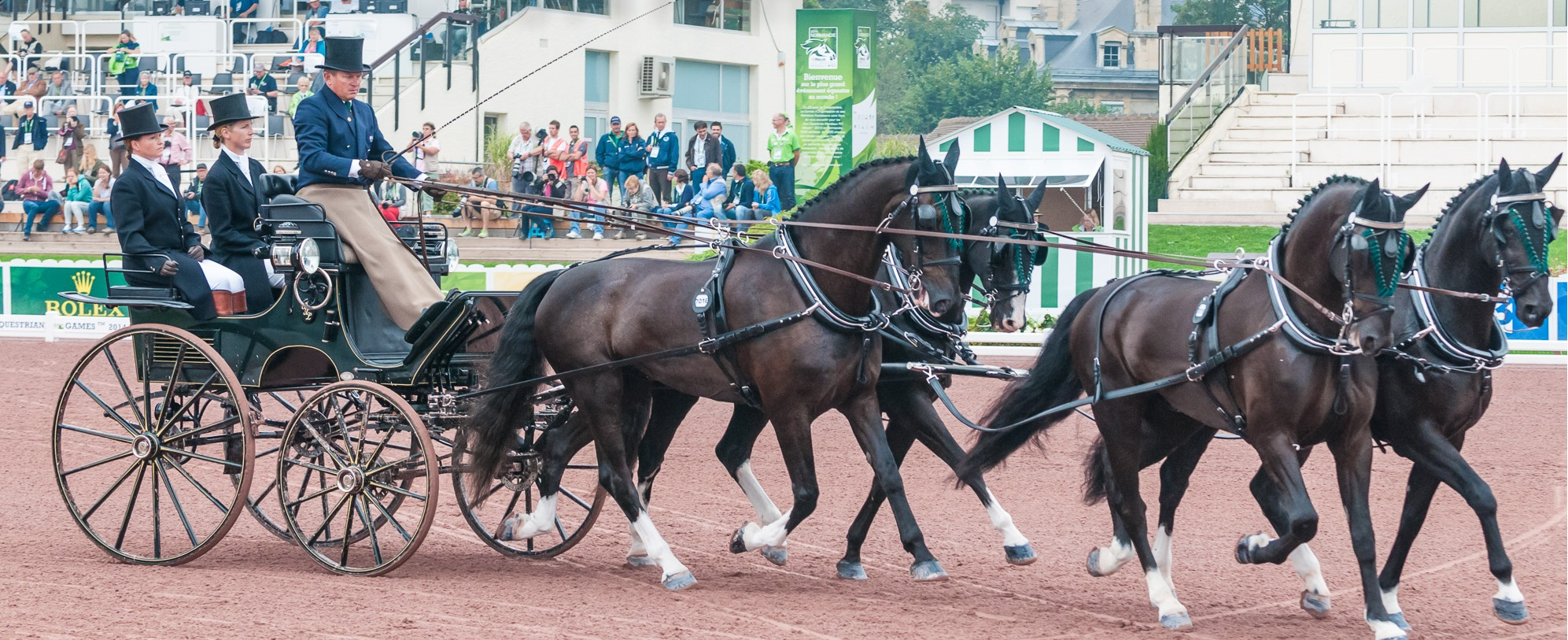
Boyd Exell driving the dressage phase at the 2014 FEI World Equestrian Games combined driving event

A four-in-hand is a team of four horses pulling a carriage, coach or other horse-drawn vehicle. Today, four-in-hand driving is the top division of combined driving in equestrian sports; other divisions are for a single horse or a pair. One of the international events featuring only four-in-hand teams is the FEI World Cup Driving series.

== Competitive sports ==
=== Racing ===
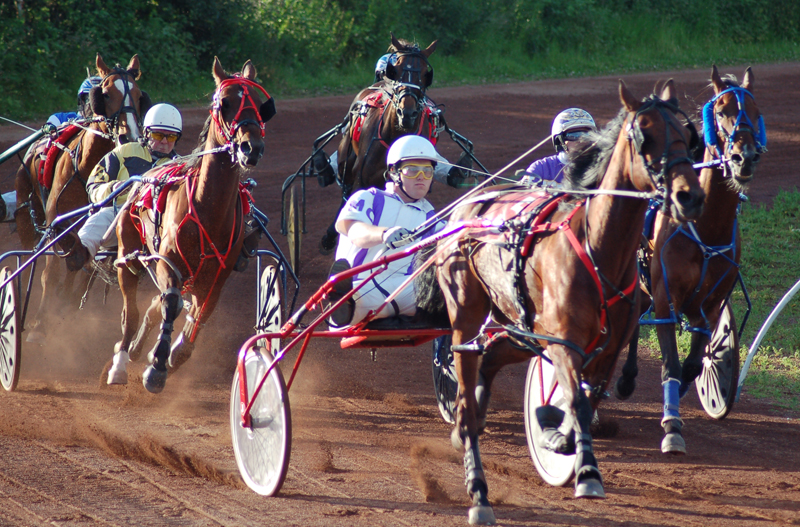
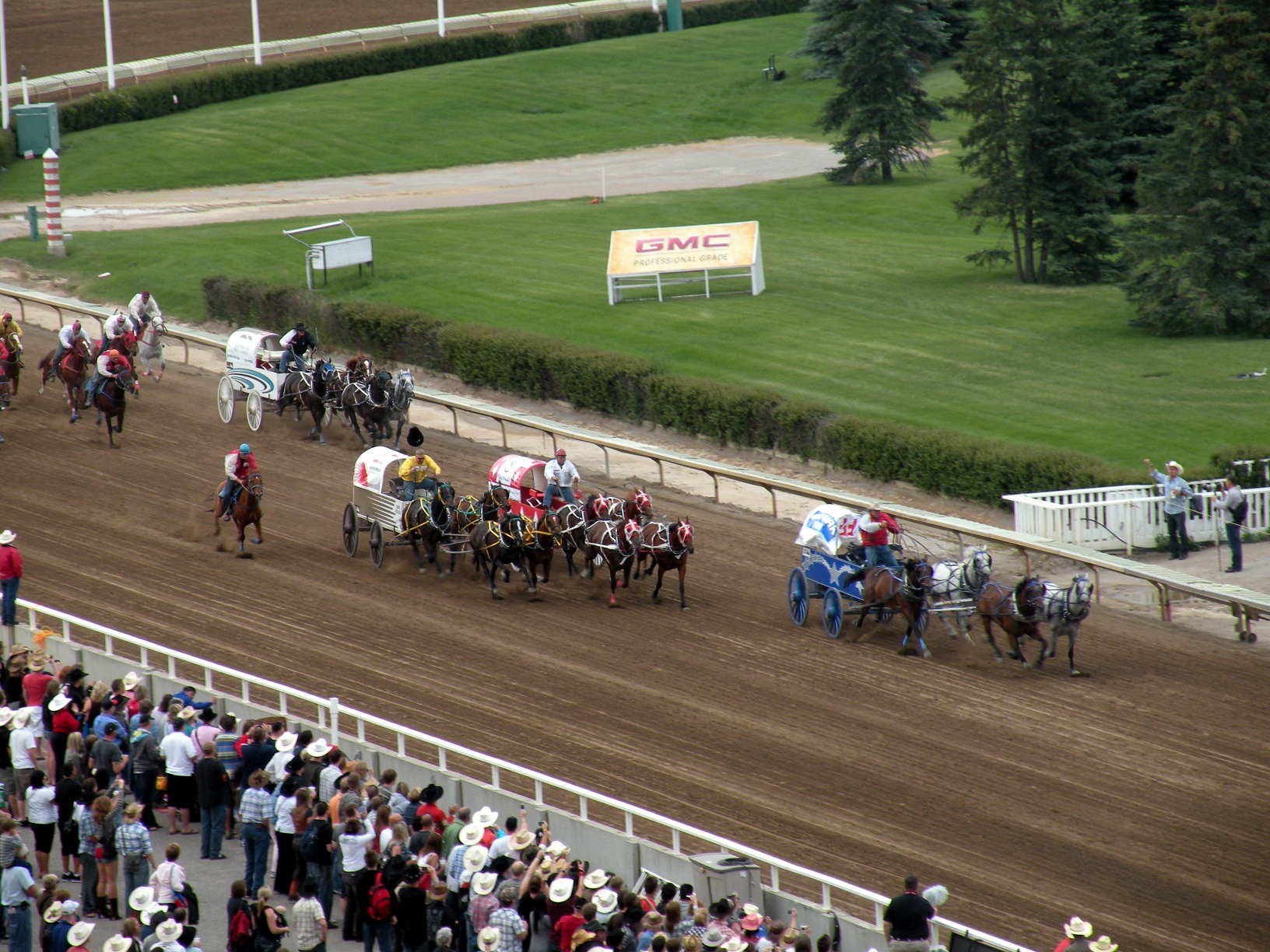
Harness racing (left), chuckwagon racing (right)

Harness racing is a speed sport at racetracks where horses pull a lightweight one-person two-wheeled cart known as a sulky.

Chuckwagon racing involves several teams racing to the finish. Each team consists of a driver, four horses pulling a covered wagon, and several outriders. Each team starts by loading the wagon (breaking camp), and then all must race together and cross the finish line.

=== Speed and accuracy ===
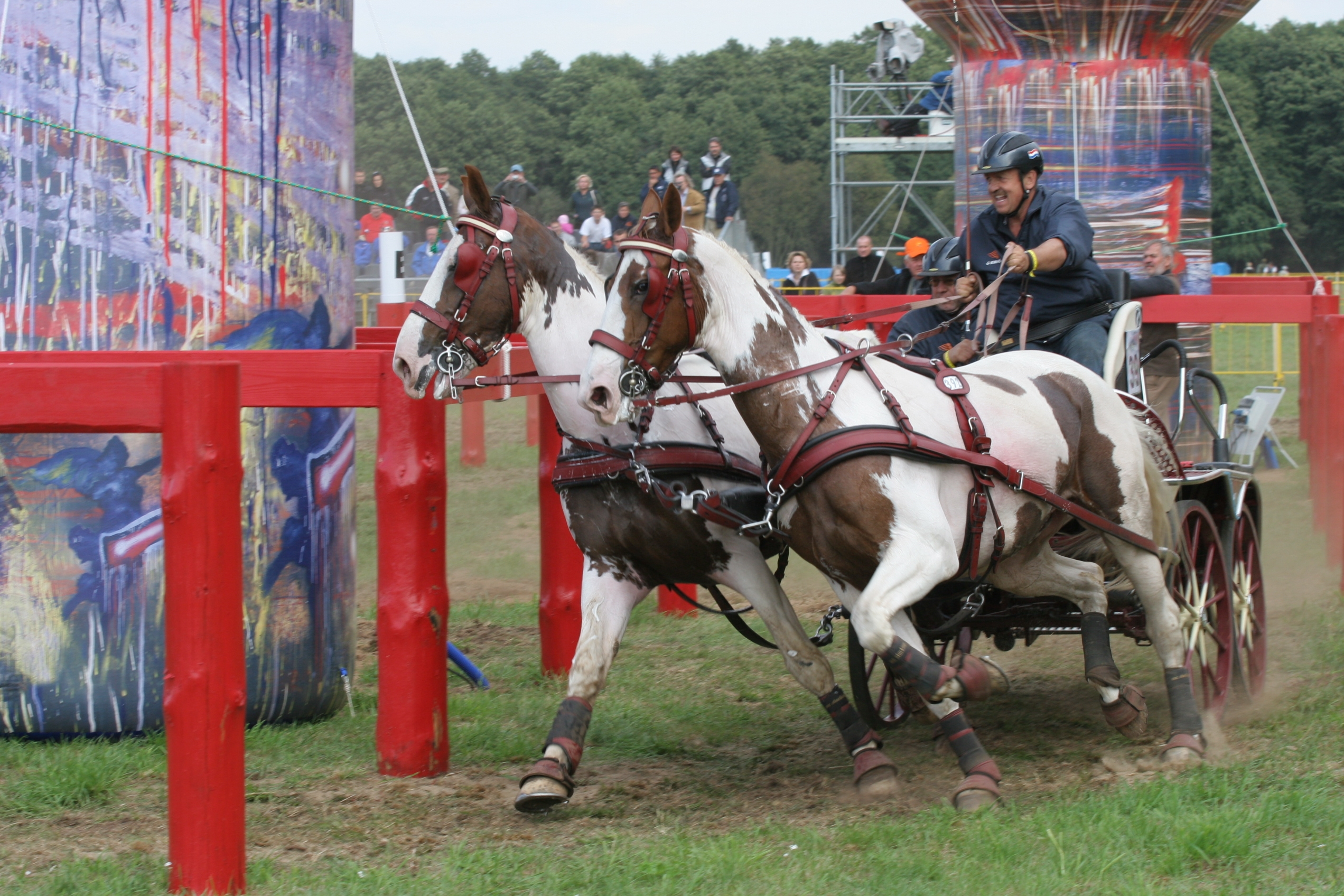
Combined driving

Combined driving is an internationally recognized FEI competition where horses compete in one, two, and four-horse teams, pulling appropriately designed light carriages or carts. They are expected to perform an arena-based dressage test where precision and control are emphasized, a cross-country "marathon" section that emphasizes fitness and endurance, and an arena obstacle course.

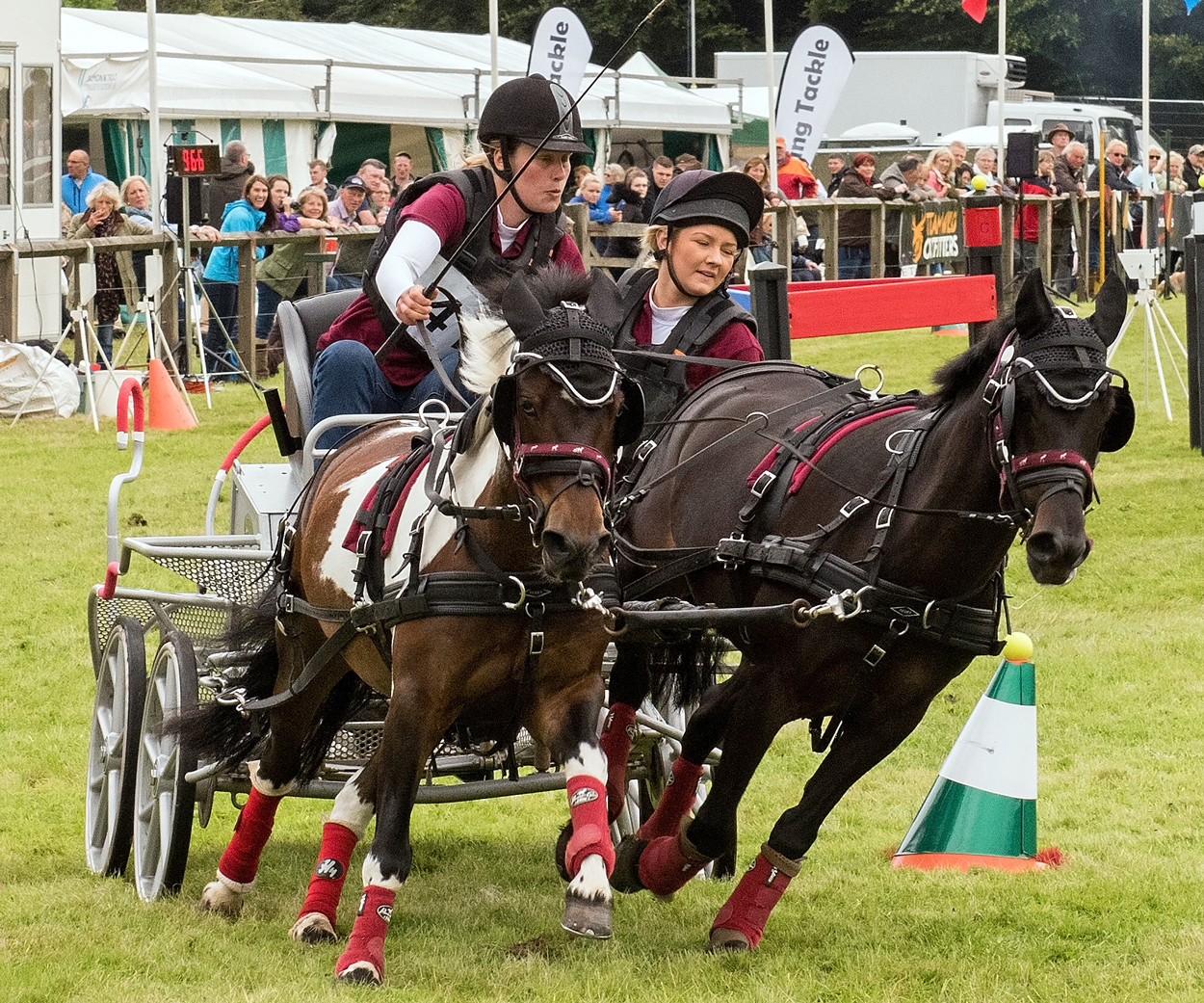
Scurry driving

Scurry driving is a speed competition in which competitors drive ponies around a course of cones, usually at a gallop. The cones are set up in pairs spaced 170 cm apart, with balls on top of each cone, and 10 to 18 pairs per course. Competitors run the course one at a time and must be accurate to navigate between the cones and avoid knocking off any balls, which incurs a time penalty. The fastest time wins. Scurry driving was developed in the UK in the 1960s as a modification of chuckwagon racing. The sport was first administered by the British Horse Society, then the British Horse Driving Trials Association, and in 2001 the Scurry Driving Association was formed and took over the organisation of events.

=== Show classes ===
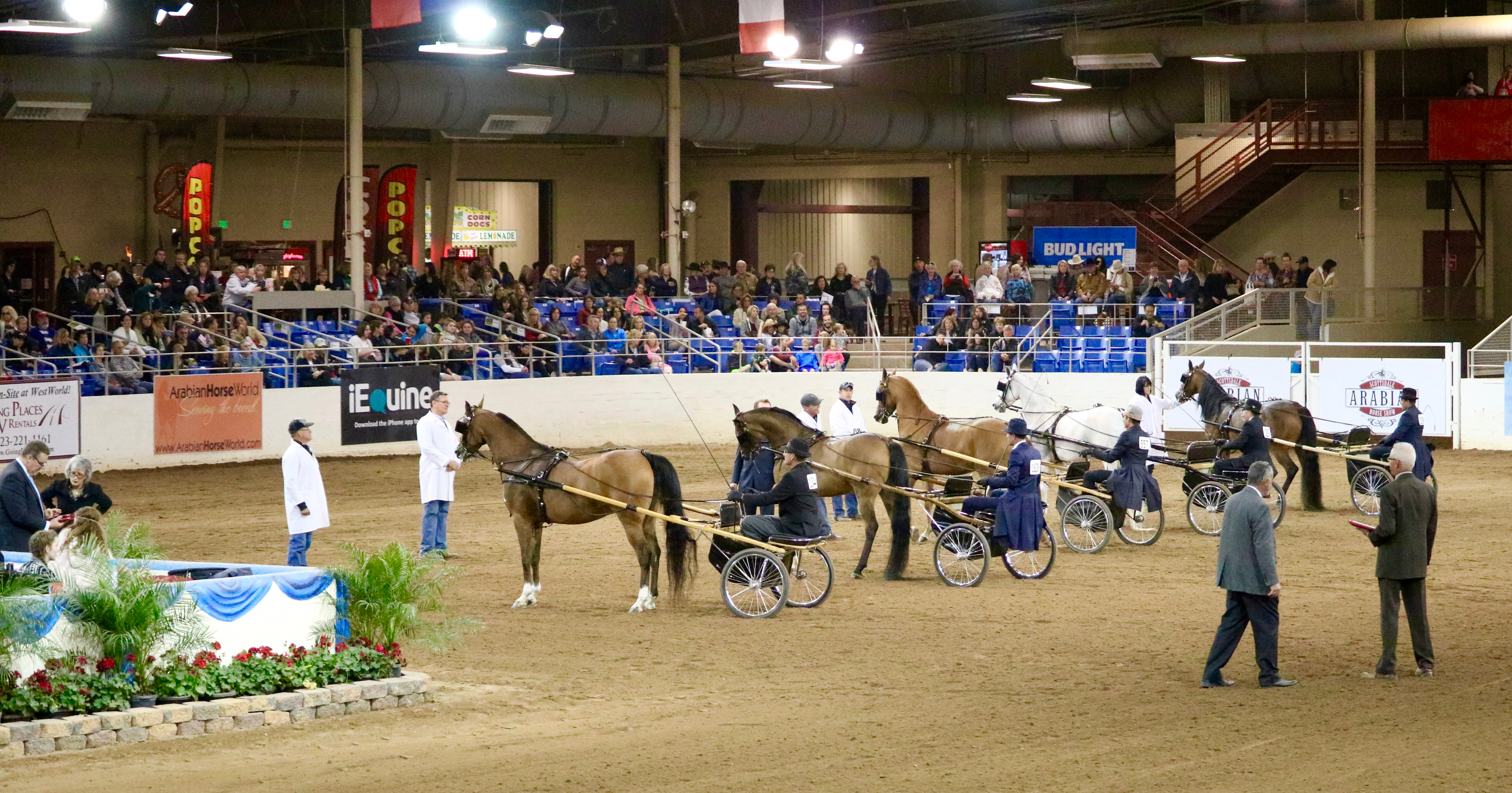
Arena horse show class for driving horses

In horse show competition, the following arena classes are seen:

- Carriage driving, using somewhat larger two or four wheeled carriages, often restored antiques, pulled by a single horse, a tandem or four-in-hand team. Pleasure competitions are judged on the turnout/neatness or suitability of horse and carriage.
- Pleasure driving, sometimes called carriage driving in some nations: Horses and ponies are usually hitched to a light, two-wheeled cart (four-wheeled fine harness carts are also seen, particularly at the highest levels of competition), and shown at a walk and two speeds of trot, with an emphasis on manners. Nearly any breed of horse can be trained for pleasure driving.
- Fine harness: Also called formal driving. Horses are hitched to a light four-wheeled cart and shown in a manner that emphasizes flashy action and dramatic performance. Refined pony breeds and certain light saddle horse breeds noted for their action are most often seen in fine harness. Most fine harness competition requires horses to perform a bit of a walk, and two types of a high-action "park" trot, a slow trot with more controlled but elegant action, and a faster, flashier trot where the horse exhibits the most animation possible, often announced by the command "show your horses" (or "show your ponies" in the case of pony shows).
- Roadster: A horse show competition, usually for ponies, (a few light horse breeds also offer roadster classes), where exhibitors wear racing silks and ride in a sulky in a style akin to harness racing, only without actually racing, but rather focusing on manners and performance. Roadsters are shown at two types of trot, known as road gait and at speed.
- Draft horse showing: Most draft horse performance competition is done in harness. Draft horses compete in both single and multiple hitches, judged on manners and performance.

=== Pulling competitions ===
Some draft horses compete in horse pulling competitions, where single or teams of horses and their drivers vie to determine who can pull the most weight for a short distance. There are also plowing competitions.

== History ==
Horses have been driven for thousands of years, with the earliest evidence of horse-drawn vehicles appearing in the ancient Near East and Eurasian steppe. Chariots, carts, and early wagons were used for transport, warfare, and ceremonial purposes across many ancient civilizations.

Over time, improvements in harness design, vehicle construction, and the breeding of larger, stronger horses allowed horses to pull heavier loads and travel more efficiently. By the medieval and early modern periods, horse-drawn vehicles were essential for agriculture, commerce, and passenger travel.

The widespread adoption of motor vehicles in the 20th century greatly reduced the practical need for driving horses. However, driving has continued as a competitive and recreational activity, supported by horse shows, harness racing, and the development of the modern sport of combined driving.

Driving clubs and coaching societies also helped preserve traditional driving skills, particularly the techniques of driving pairs and four-in-hand.

== Driving clubs ==
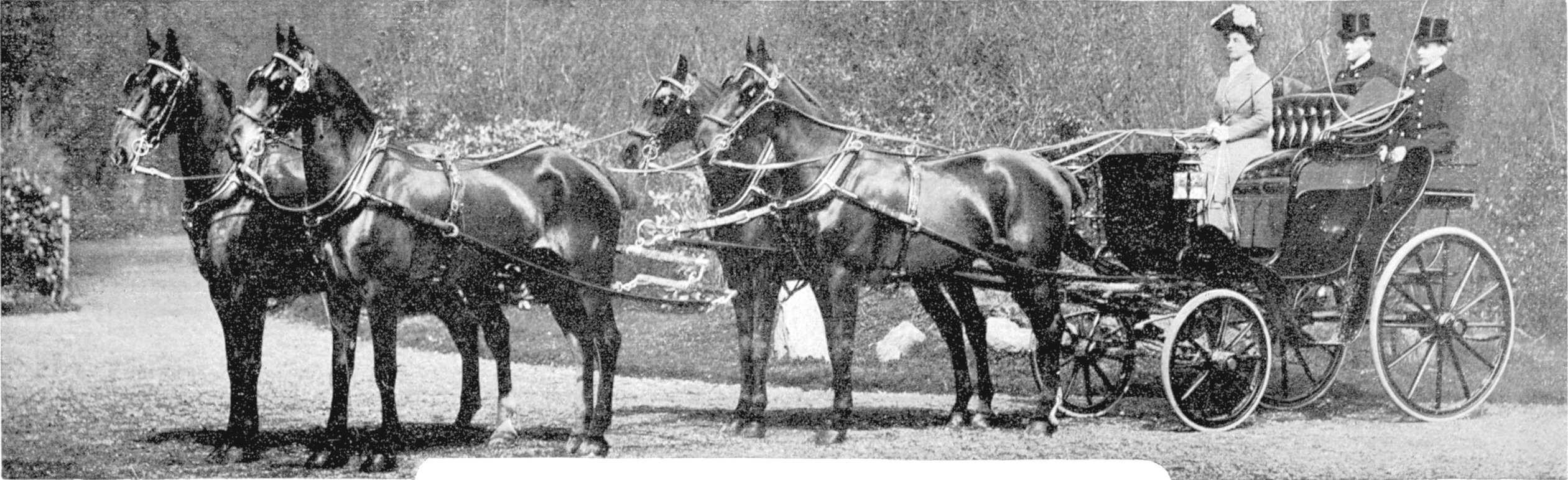
A woman driving four-in-hand in Paris (1905)

In Europe, after mail coaches and public post coaches were largely supplanted by railroad travel, (Note: In England, public coach travel was quickly replaced by rail travel in the 1830s and 1840s.) driving large private coaches drawn by four horses became a popular sporting activity of the rich, and driving clubs were formed. England's Four-In-Hand Driving Club was formed in 1856. Membership was limited to thirty and they drove private coaches known as drags made on the pattern of the old Post Office mail coaches but luxuriously finished and outfitted. A new group called the Coaching Club was formed in 1870 for those unable to join the club of 30. Other enthusiasts revived old coaching routes and took paying passengers. Alfred Gwynne Vanderbilt championed coaching in America, and he and several other of his contemporaries engaged in public coaching for hire in America and England. T. Bigelow Lawrence of Boston owned America's first locally built park drag in 1860. Leonard Jerome took to driving coaches with six and eight horse teams to go to watch horse races. New York's Coaching Club was formed in 1875.

== See also ==
- Draft horse
- Horse harness
- Glossary of carriage and driving terminology
- Bibliography of carriages and driving
