= Driving club =

Membership club for carriage driving

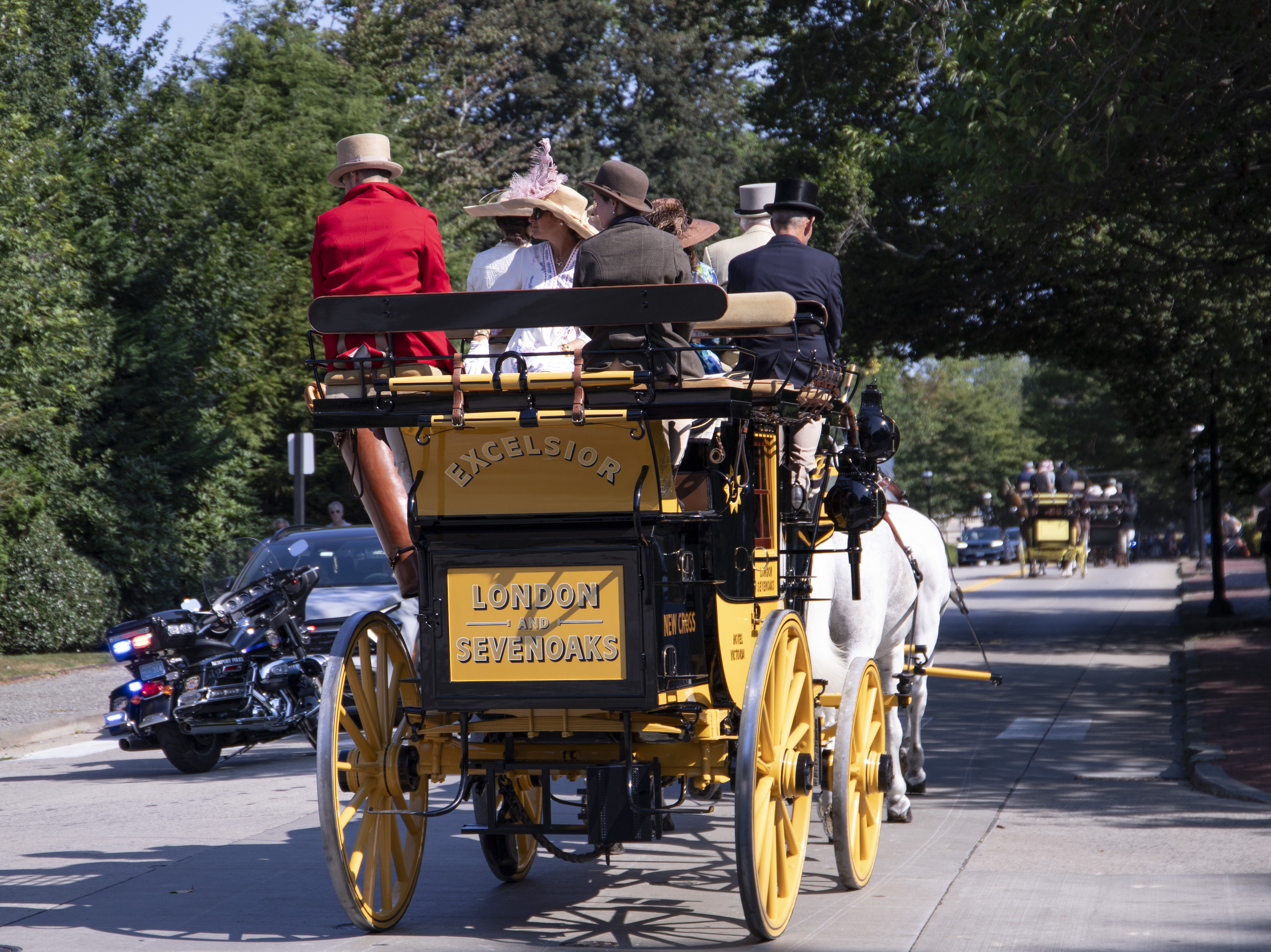
At a coaching weekend, Coaching Club of New York, 2025

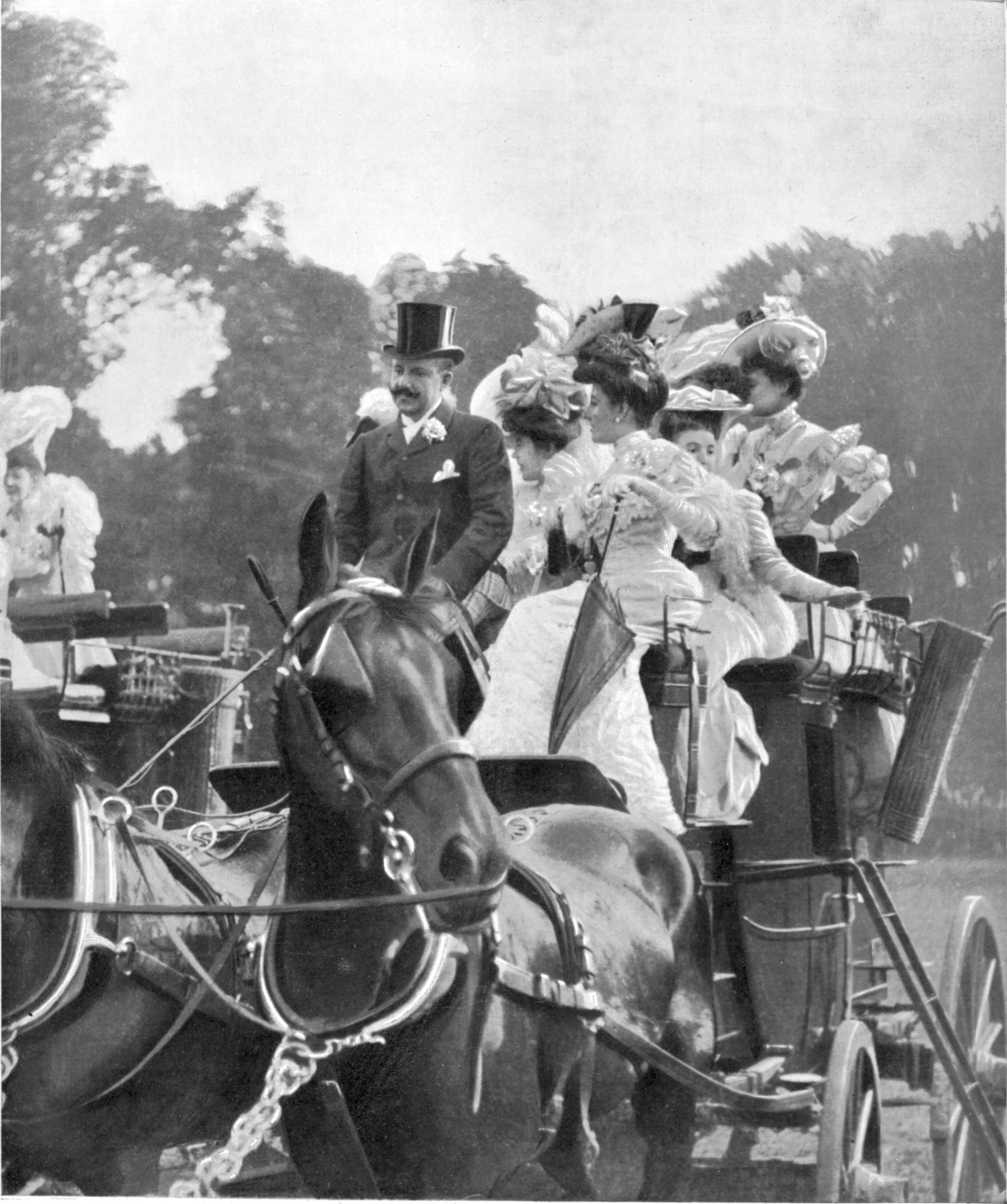
Société des Guides, a French coaching and road-driving club, 1906

A driving club is a membership club for activities of driving horses. Originating in the 19th century, they were organized for the social and recreational practice of driving carriages and coaches, and they coordinated outings and established equipment standards. In early 1800s Britain, driving clubs established rules for vehicles, harnesses, attire, and group processions, and became fixtures of elite leisure culture. By the mid-1800s, similar organizations emerged in the United States which conducted long distance drives and public demonstrations. Driving clubs have persisted into the twentieth and twenty-first centuries in many forms including for recreational driving and competitive horse-driving sports such as combined driving.

== 19th century British clubs ==
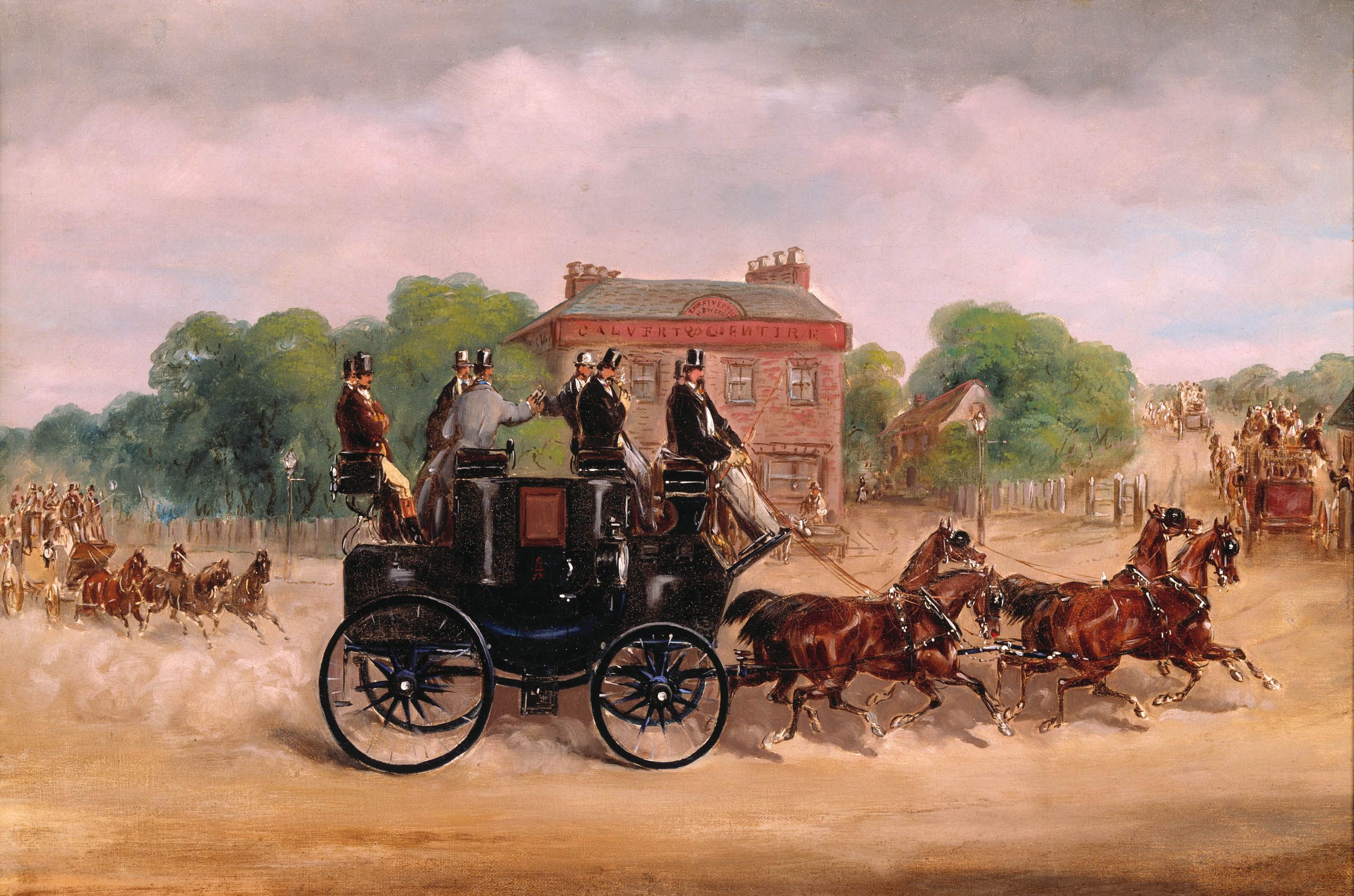
Drags of the Four-in-Hand Club by Samuel Henry Alken

The Bensington Driving Club was founded in 1807 at Bensington, Oxfordshire, later known as the Benson Driving Club when the village name changed, later still as the Bedfont Driving Club, and commonly referred to as the "B.D.C." Its membership was limited to twenty-five. It met first at the White Hart and later at the Black Dog in Bedfont, giving rise to the nickname "the Black and White Club". The club was disbanded in 1854.

The Four Horse Club was founded in 1808, prompted by the B.D.C.'s membership limit of twenty-five. It was founded by Charles Buxton, inventor of the Buxton bit. Its members drove barouches and adopted distinctive carriage and harness specifications, along with a formal dress code for drivers. The club made regular group drives to Salt Hill, and underwent a brief revival in 1822 before dissolving in 1826.

The Richmond Driving Club was founded in 1838 by George Stanhope, 6th Earl of Chesterfield. It only lasted until 1845. It used to meet at Lord Chesterfield's house, and drive in procession to dinner at the Castle Hotel in Richmond. One member was Mr Angerstein, a particularly reckless driver whose reputation led no-one to want to ride with him. An anecdote relates that once someone unwittingly climbed into his carriage after dinner for the ride home. Angerstein, so excited that someone had actually chosen to ride with him, set off immediately without waiting for the rest of the procession. Once the passenger realized whose carriage he was on, jumped straight off into the road.

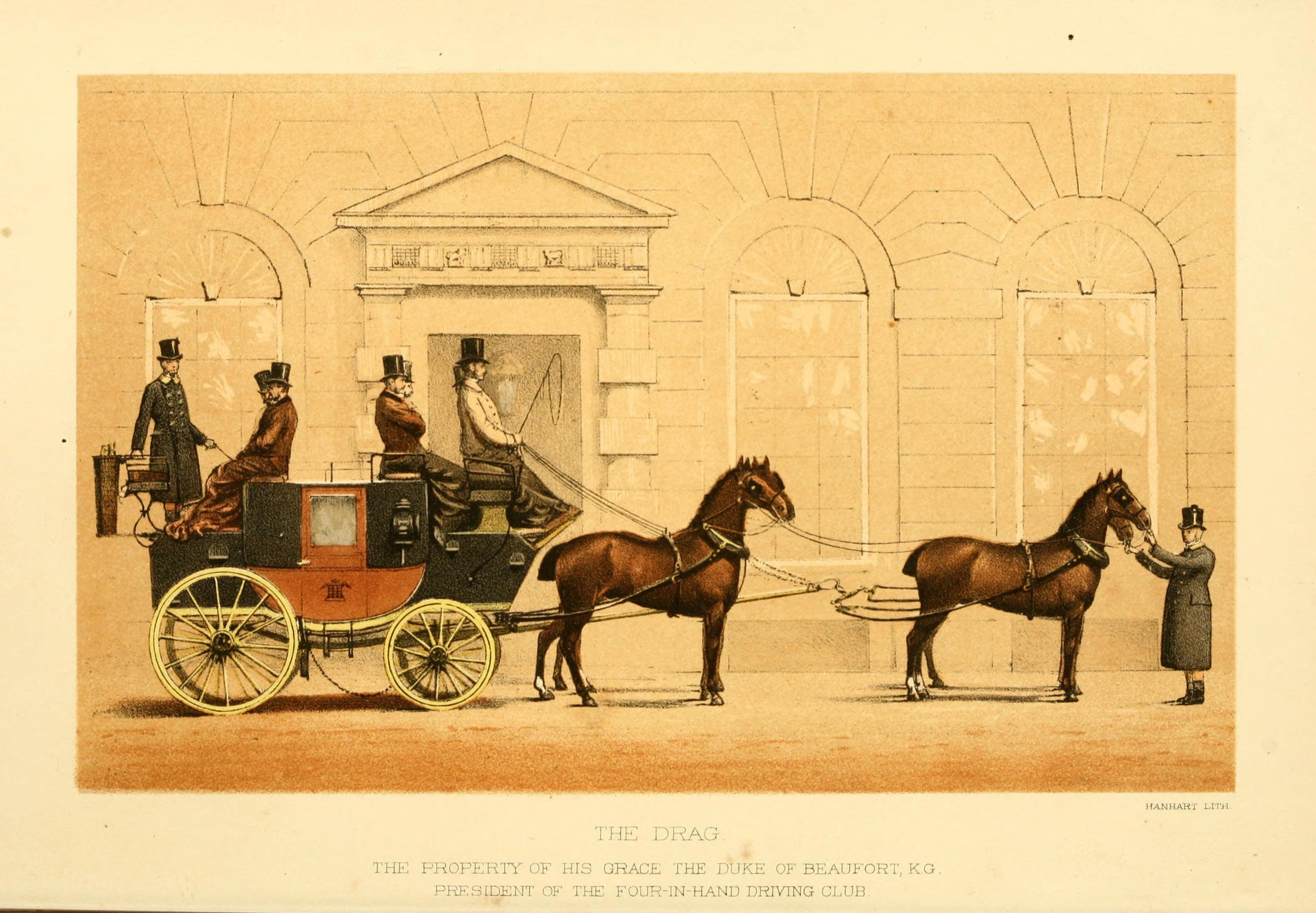
Drag of His Grace the Duke of Beaufort, president of the Four-in-Hand Driving Club

The Four-In-Hand Driving Club (FHDC) was founded in 1856 by William Morritt, patterned after the earlier clubs; limited to 30 members (later 55). Notable founding members included many titled aristocrats, including the Duke of Beaufort who became its president, and later authored the book Driving.

The Four-In-Hand Coaching Club was created in 1870 to be a less exclusive "sister club" to the FHDC. Originally limited to 50 members, it soon grew to 120. It held its first meet in 1871 at the Marble Arch in London. The Duke of Beaufort was president.

== 19th century American clubs ==
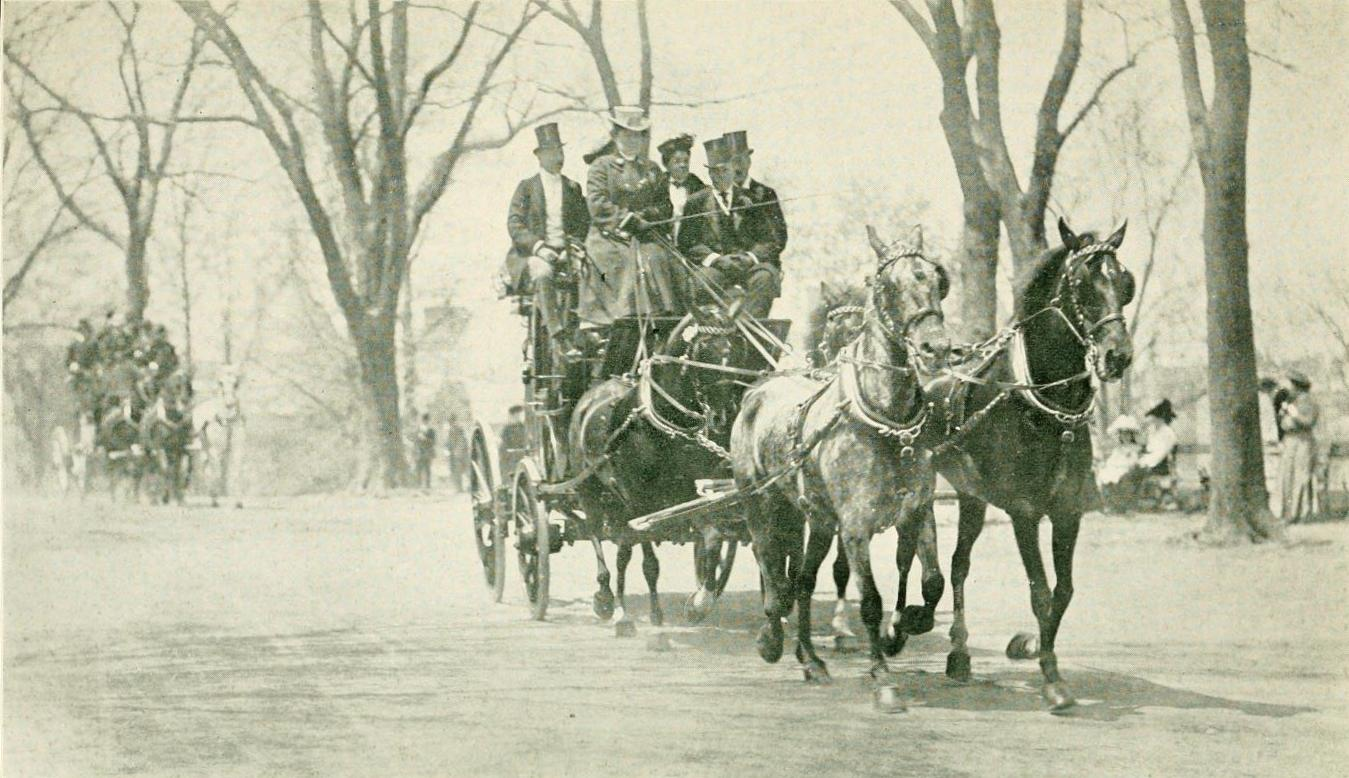
Ladies' Four-in-Hand Driving Club meet, 1906

The Four-in-hand Club of New York was the earliest coaching club in the US. Active in the 1860s, they drove to Jerome Park Racetrack each year to watch the horse racing.

The Coaching Club of New York was established in 1875. They organized annual long distance drives, the first in 1878 between New York and Philadelphia, 98 miles each way. Other drives were organized to cities around New York state, as well as to Connecticut, Massachusetts, and Vermont. The club's membership operated 46 drags, and the club itself owned the coach Pioneer which made daily runs between Holland House and Ardsley, New York for three years. Several members introduced the sport in France, organizing the Reunion Road Club of Paris.

The Four-in-hand Club of Philadelphia was established in 1890.

The Ladies' Four-in-Hand Driving Club was formed in 1901 by society women, and flourished until automobile traffic made coaching impossible, some time after 1910.

In the late 19th century, enthusiasts in Boston, Massachusetts formed several trotting associations—also known as "gentlemen's driving clubs" or Standardbred driving clubs. These clubs held amateur races at the Readville Race Course, the Riverside Riding Park in Allston (later Beacon Park), and the South End Driving Park. As of 2026, the United States Trotting Association lists 15 amateur Standardbred driving clubs across eight states. These clubs hold amateur races at their home tracks, before the regular racecard.

== Contemporary driving organizations ==
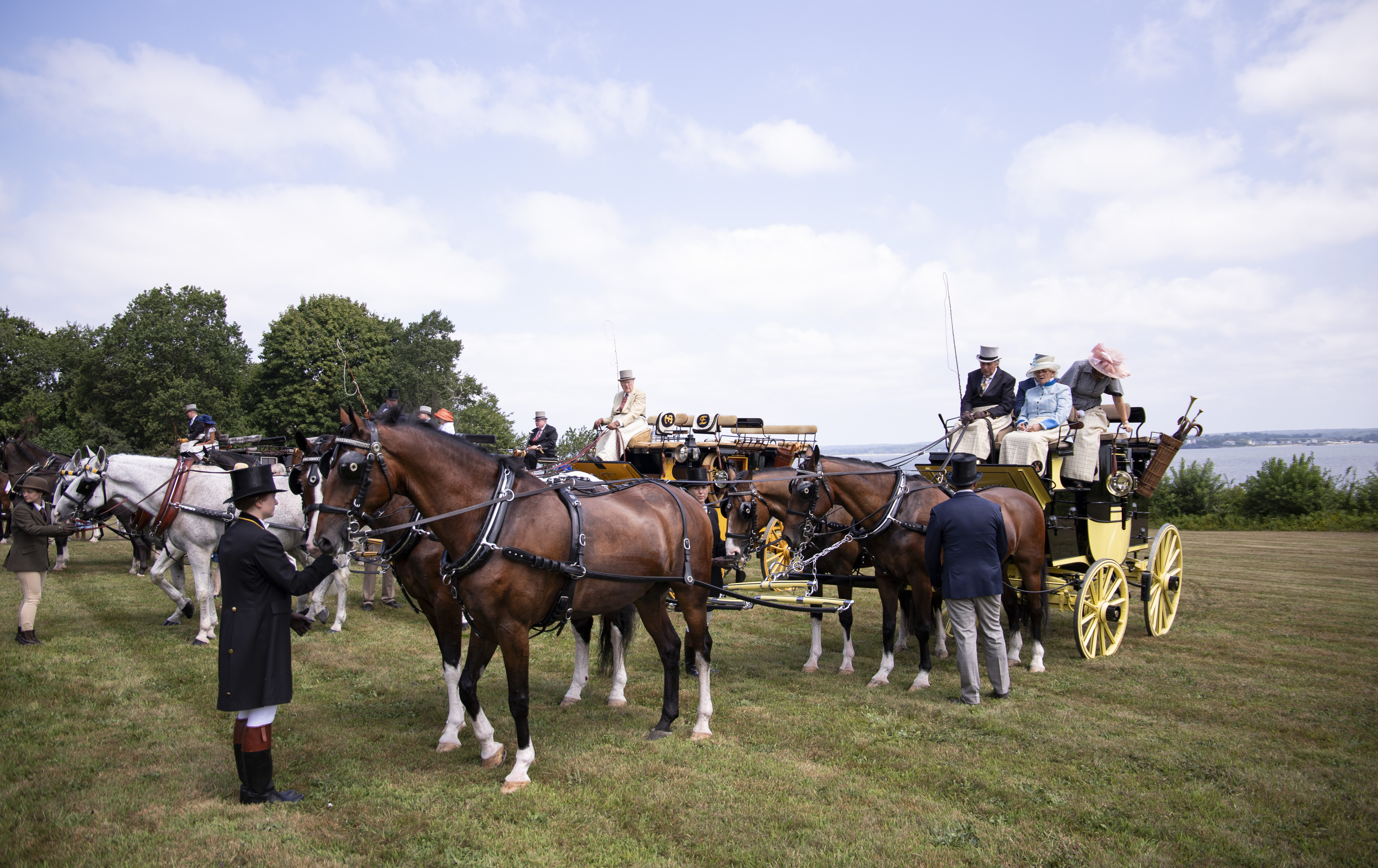
Gathering of coaches, 2025

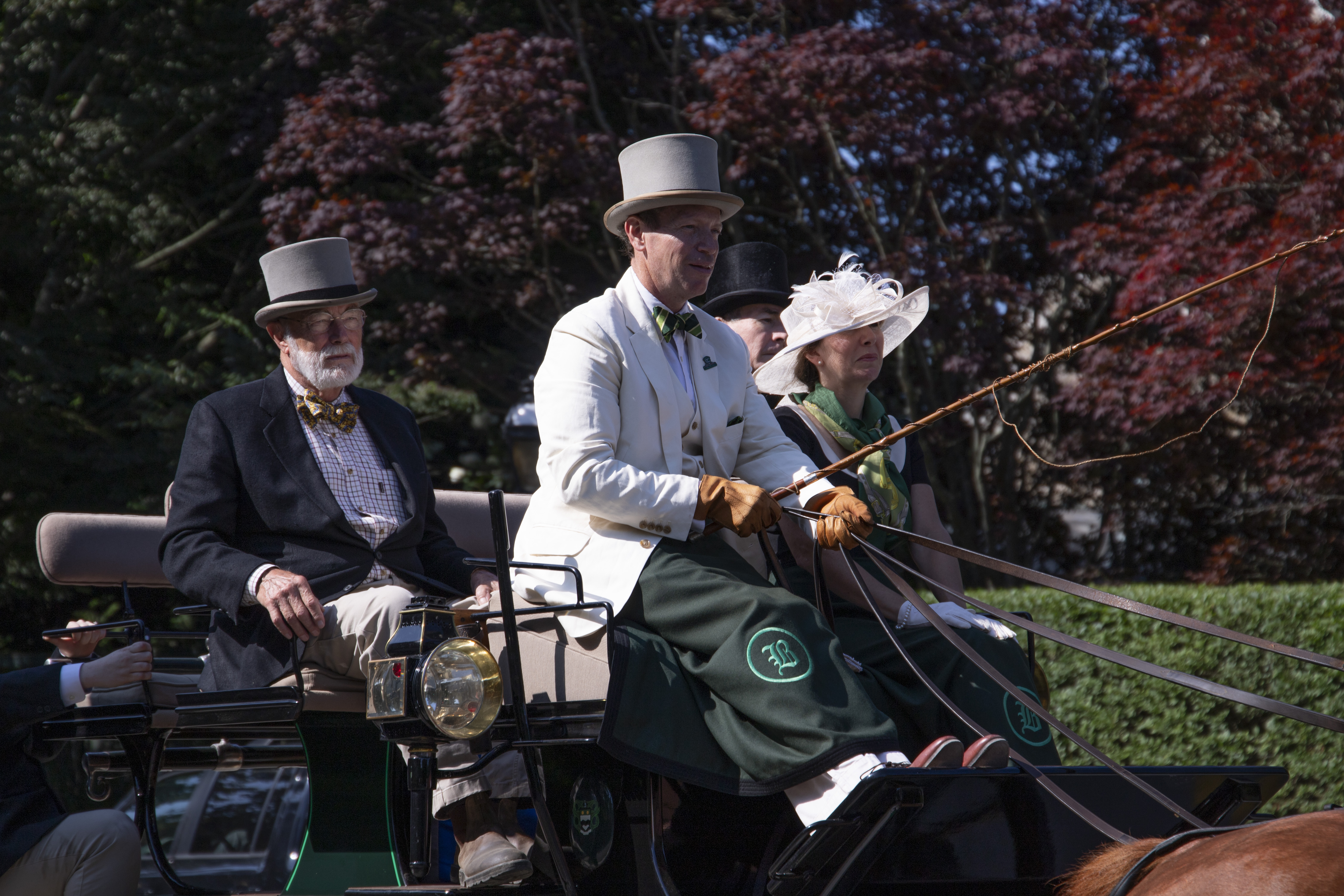
Contemporary social coaching attire, 2025

Contemporary driving clubs and organizations provide sport governance, maintain rule systems and training pathways, support preservation standards, and organize events.

The Fédération Équestre Internationale (FEI) is the international governing body for combined driving worldwide. It maintains competition rules, licenses officials, and sanctions World Championships and World Cup events.

National federations administer domestic combined driving rules, national championships, and driver development programs. As of 2026, there are 135 national federations affiliated with the FEI.

- British Carriagedriving (BC) — National governing body for combined driving in the United Kingdom; administers national championships and driver development programs. Formerly known as British Horse Driving Trials Association (BHDTA).
- Horse Sport Ireland (HSI) Carriage Driving Section — the national body administering carriage driving in Ireland, overseeing dressage, marathon, and obstacle driving competition and providing membership, guidance, and discipline support under the HSI affiliate structure.
- American Driving Society (ADS) — Primary North American governing body that maintains carriage driving rules, training systems, licensed officials, and event standards; supports regional driving clubs and competitions.
- Equestrian Canada (EC) — Administers the FEI driving discipline in Canada; coordinates with regional driving clubs and ADS-aligned activities.
- Australian Carriage Driving Society — National carriage driving organization covering all driving disciplines including pleasure and competition.

Heritage and preservation bodies support carriage conservation, museum collaboration, and technical and historical documentation.

- Carriage Association of America (CAA) — Devoted to carriage preservation and driving education; publishes The Carriage Journal; provides technical guidance and proficiency programs; organizes learning weekends, driving weekends, the biennial International Carriage Symposium, and member trips to carriage collections and driving events.
- Carriage Foundation UK — a carriage history and preservation group that maintains a public vehicle register, provides educational resources and study tours, publishes newsletters and journals.

Pleasure driving and sport associations coordinate recreational drives, events, turnout standards, and safety programs.

- World Coaching Club — a women's-only coaching club limited to 25 members who own and drive a four-in-hand road coach or park drag; WCC plans drives in the US and Europe.
- British Driving Society — Pleasure driving association organizing recreational drives, turnout standards, and safety programs.
- Indoor Carriage Driving (ICD UK) — a national organization coordinating a winter season of precision-and-paces, cones, and obstacle competitions across multiple regions, operating over 120 volunteer-run events and an annual three-day championship, with participation ranging from beginner to international drivers.
- Germany has numerous local and regional driving clubs (Fahrvereine) affiliated with the German Equestrian Federation which support recreational and competitive driving.
