= British Horse Industry Confederation =

Trade association in the UK

The British Horse Industry Confederation (or BHIC) was a representative umbrella organisation for both professional and amateur involvement in equestrian activities in Great Britain. The organisation was formed of the British Equestrian Federation (or BEF), the Thoroughbred Breeders Association and the British Horseracing Authority. It also had representation from the British Horse Society and the British Equestrian Trade Association (both members of the BEF) and from the British Equine Veterinary Association.

In 2018, the BHIC, together with the Equine Sector Council for Health & Welfare, was replaced by the British Horse Council.

== Activities ==
The organisation represented the interests of the equestrian industry in dealings and reports with government.

In 2005, the BHIC published the first national strategy for the horse industry in England and Wales, in partnership with the government departments from Defra and the Department for Culture, Media and Sport.
