= British Equestrian Vaulting =

British sport governing body

British Equestrian Vaulting is the governing body for the sport of equestrian vaulting in Great Britain, responsible for all aspects of coaching and development. The organisation also selects competitors for Team GBR. It is one of the 16 organisations which form part of the British Equestrian Federation.
