= British Eventing =

British governing body in an equestrian sport

British Eventing (BE) is the Great Britain governing body for the equestrian sport of eventing, which combines a single rider and horse pairing competing in dressage, showjumping and cross country. The organisation both regulates the sport and organises nearly 200 affiliated events across the country. In Great Britain, the eventing season runs from March to October every year, weather conditions permitting. There are all sorts of different levels from BE80 (80 cm) to 5* eventing. In 2019 the existing 4* events were changed to 5* events which include Badminton and Burghley.

British Eventing is responsible for Team GB selection for the Olympics and other international events. It forms part of the national umbrella body, the British Equestrian Federation. Based at Stoneleigh in Warwickshire, it has over 11,000 members.

== History ==
Formerly known as the British Horse Trials Association (BHTA), the organisation changed its name at the start of 2001, as the term 'horse trials' was gradually being replaced across the globe. Eventing combines three phases: dressage, showjumping and cross country.

== Governance ==
BE has a Board and Committee responsible for such areas as major events, rules, training, safety, and team selection. The current chairman is Mark Sartori and the CEO is Rosie Williams OBE.
