= British Equestrian =

UK governing body for equestrian sport

- Formation: 1972
- Type: Sport governing body
- Headquarters: Kenilworth
- Location: United Kingdom
- Members: 15 full and 4 associate member organisations representing 280,000 members between them
- Official language: English
- Chair: Fields Wicker-Miurin OBE FKC
- Patron: Queen Camilla
- Key people: Jim Eyre, Chief Executive
- Staff: 25
- Website: britishequestrian.org.uk
- Formerly called: British Equestrian Federation

British Equestrian (previously the British Equestrian Federation), founded 1972 is the national governing body of equestrian sport in Great Britain and represents the country at the International Federation for Equestrian Sports (FEI). The Queen is the organisation's patron.

== Remit ==
As an umbrella body, the purpose of the federation is the steering of equestrianism in Britain.

Together with the British Horseracing Authority and the Thoroughbred Breeders Association, the federation forms the British Horse Industry Confederation. As of 2024, the body has 829 officials, 2081 registered athletes and 4572 registered horses.

== Leadership ==
The leaderships stands for a period of four years, with a maximum of two terms. The chair is Fields Wicker-Miurin as of 2024, with previous chairmen including Badminton Horse Trials organiser Hugh Thomas.

== Membership ==
British Equestrian is formed of twenty (fourteen full, six associate) independent member bodies who represent the various equestrian sports.

- Association of British Riding Schools
- British Carriagedriving
- British Dressage
- British Equestrian Trade Association
- British Equestrian Vaulting
- British Eventing
- British Grooms Association
- British Horseball Association
- British Horseback Archery Association
- British Reining
- British Showjumping
- Endurance GB
- Mounted Games Association of Great Britain
- Riding for the Disabled Association
- The British Horse Society
- The Pony Club
- The Showing Council
- UK Polocrosse Association
- World Horse Welfare
- Horsescotland
