= Coach (carriage) =

Large four-wheeled closed carriage

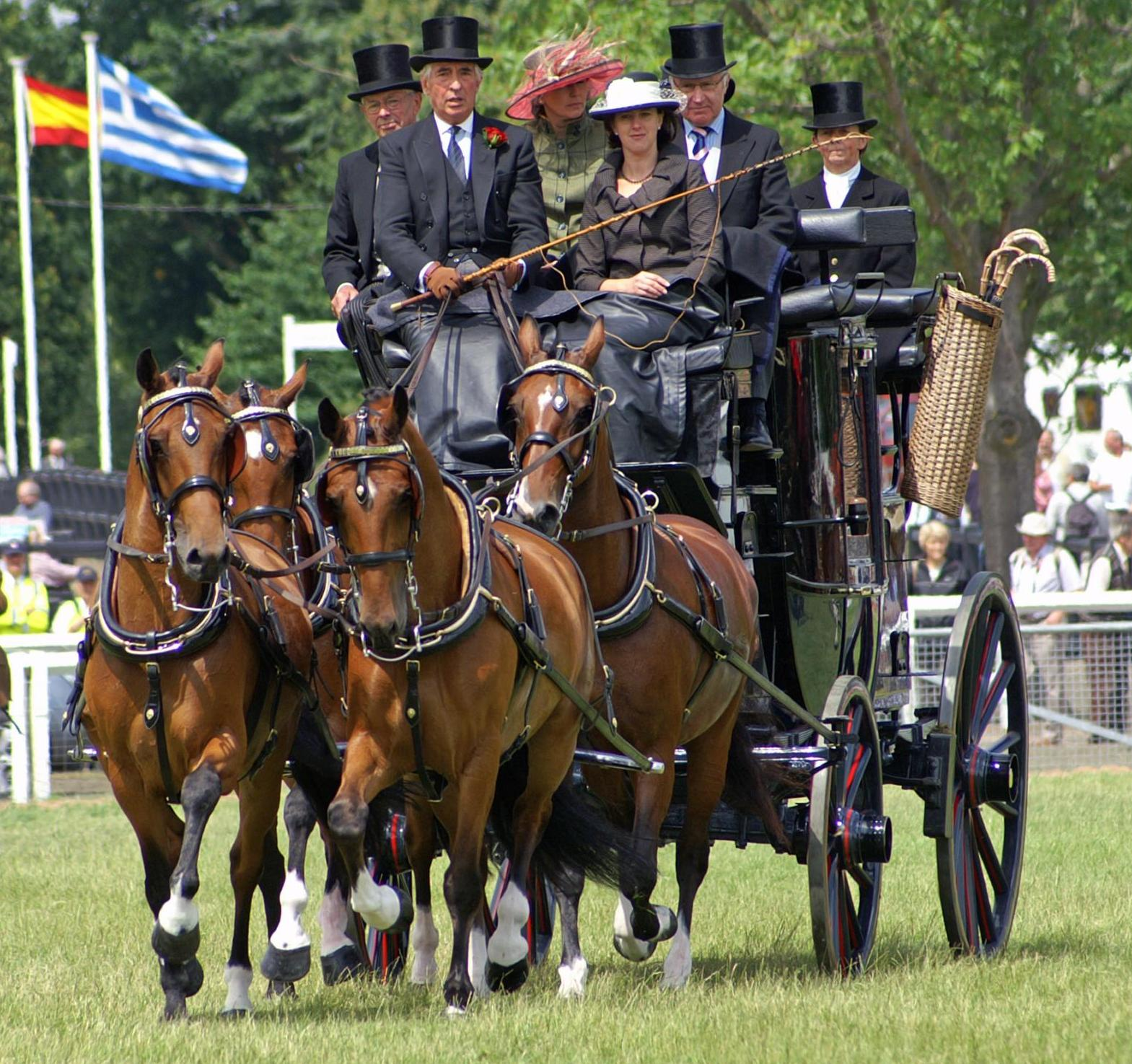
A park drag coach in a coaching competition (2009)

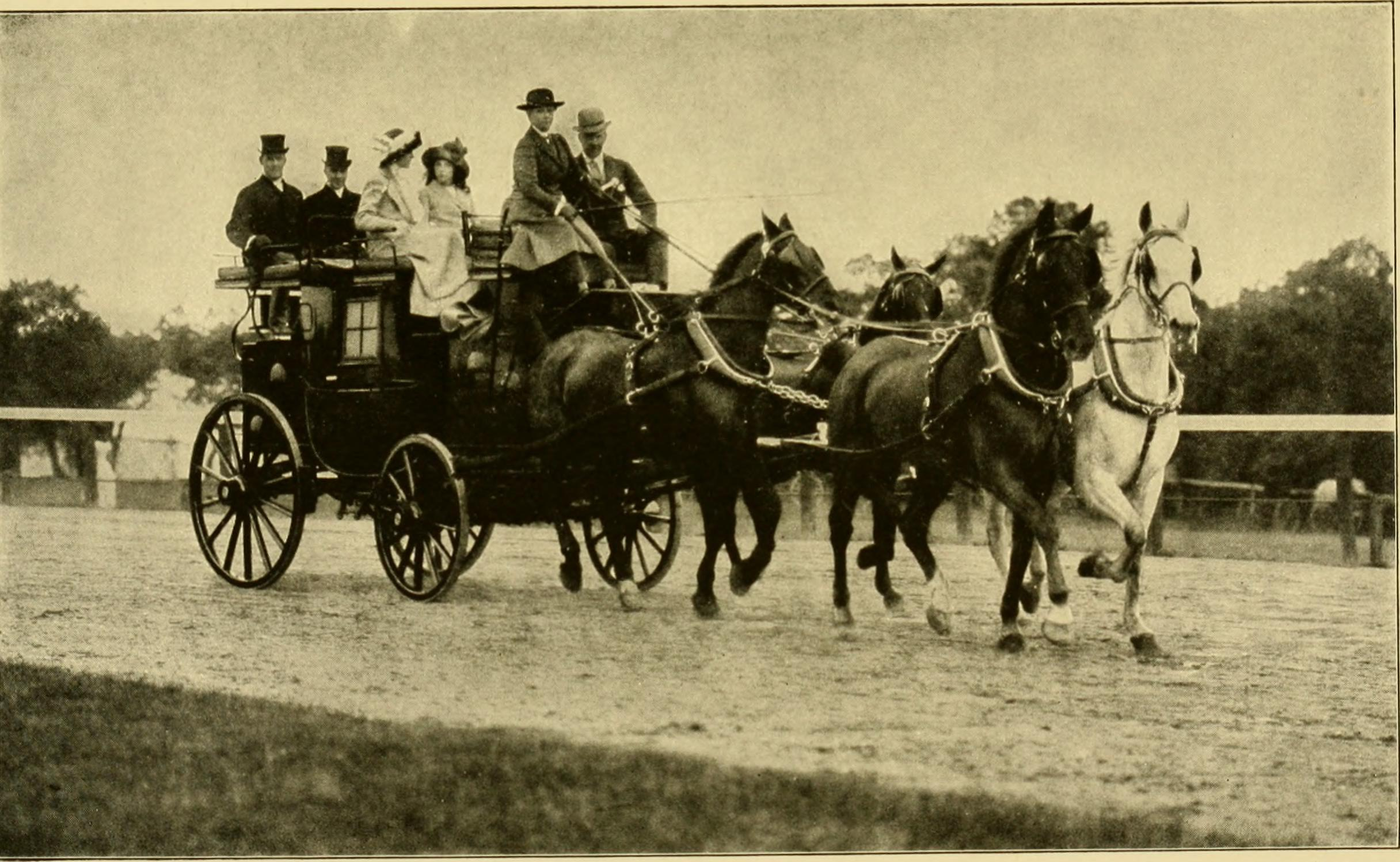
Coach driving (1912)

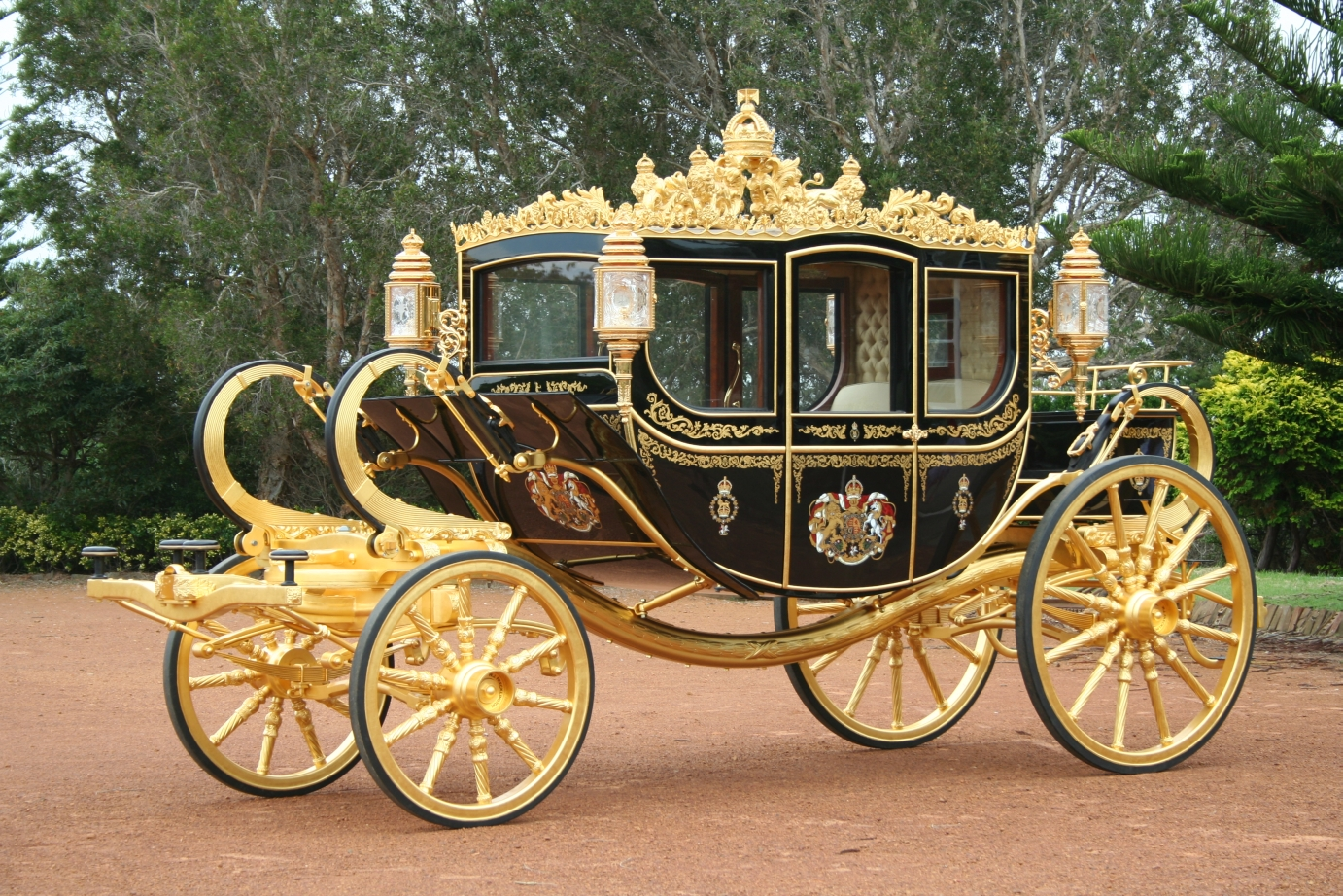
The Diamond Jubilee, a state coach built in 2014

Coaches are horse-drawn carriages which are large, enclosed, four-wheeled, pulled by two or more horses, and controlled by a coachman or postilion (riders). If driven by a coachman, there is a raised seat in front for a coachman called a box, box seat, or coach box. A coach body typically has a door on each side, a forward facing seat, and frequently another seat facing it. Coaches were built for specific purposes which included transporting mail or travelers, privately owned coaches, and elaborate coaches for state occasions.

== Types ==
Coaches were constructed for specific purposes. Below is a list of general types of coaches and their purposes.

- Private coach: Privately owned, usually by a noble family or high-ranking official.
- Public coach: Used in public service to carry mail, passengers, and parcels.
- Mail coach or post coach: A public coach contracted to carry mail along established routes, but also carried premium-fare passengers. The first mail coach in Britain traveled from London to Edinburgh in about 1785, and to Glasgow in 1788.
- Stage coach: A public coach for transporting passengers on a given road to a regular schedule, driving from stage to stage where horses were quickly changed and the coach continued to the next stage.
- Road coach: Used at first as a term for the public mail and stage coaches. After the railways took over the mail routes, some of the retired coaches were purchased by gentlemen or syndicates who ran some of the old routes for passenger travel. The term was later used to indicate these same types of coaches owned privately and driven for pleasure or show.
- Drag: A private coach used as a sporting pleasure vehicle, usually used during driving club activities and painted in dark somber colors. It is constructed lighter than the robust mail and stage coaches which preceded them. (Note: Quotation, page 239: "the term now recognized as properly descriptive of a coach for private driving is 'drag.'") (Note: John M. Seabrook shows his park drag made by F & R Shanks (at 8:50-10:00 minutes), and Thomas Ryder explains the difference between a park drag and a road coach (at 10:00-12:15 minutes))
- State coach: An ornate or elegant coach used to carry very important persons, like visiting heads of state, royalty and high nobility. Some state coaches are used today for ceremonies and state occasions.
- Hackney coach: A public coach for hire in a similar manner to contemporary taxicabs. The use of these in England began in 1625.
- Cab: A for-hire public convenience; may be a carriage or a coach. Often these were purchased used from gentlemen when their coaches were worn out or no longer in style.

Others in the traditional coach family include:

- Berlin or Berline
- Brougham
- Clarence
- Concord
- Diligence
- Stagecoach
- Stage wagon or mud wagon (US)

The Barouche and Landau are considered in the coach family because they are built on a coach undercarriage and with the lower body of a coach, though they have falling hoods (folding tops). The chariot is also considered part of the coach family even though it is a shortened version (seats only two). The horse-drawn omnibus, a long-bodied public vehicle used to transport many passengers in cities, is classified as a wagonette and not as a coach because passengers enter from the rear and seating is arranged lengthwise.

Individual coaches that operated on regular posting and staging routes in England were often given names. "Tally-Ho" was originally the name used on several fast services in England in the early 19th century. Because of this, the term "Tally-Ho" became associated with road coaches in general. In the United States, the term spread further after DeLancey Astor Kane named his imported 1875 road coach Tally-Ho, reinforcing its use as a generic term for a large or fast coach. (Note: Quotation from pages 236 & 239, "A curious error into which people generally have fallen is that of calling the four-in-hand coach a Tally-ho. Even the lexicographers have perpetuated it, and so I suppose it will stand, although it may be interesting to point it out. De Lancey Kane named the four-in-hand road coach which he drove between New York and Pelham, a quarter of a century ago, the Tally-ho. It was merely the name of the vehicle, given according to English usage to the coaches which rumbled over their highways, for convenience in advertising and in conversation, the same as the name of a sea-going vessel.")

Types of coaches

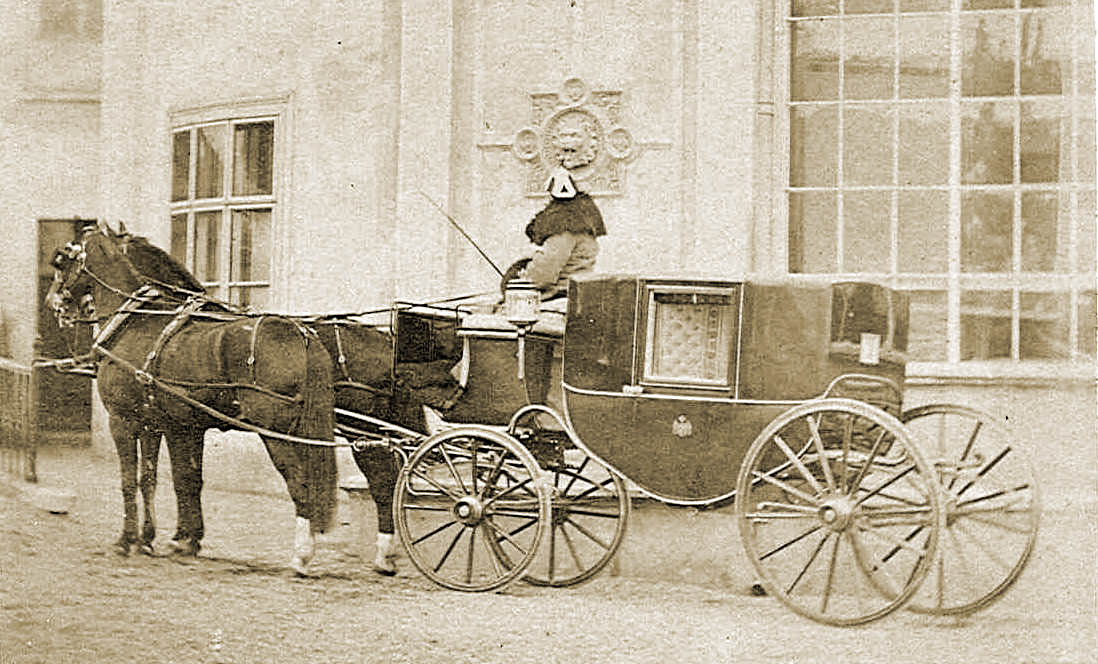
A private coach

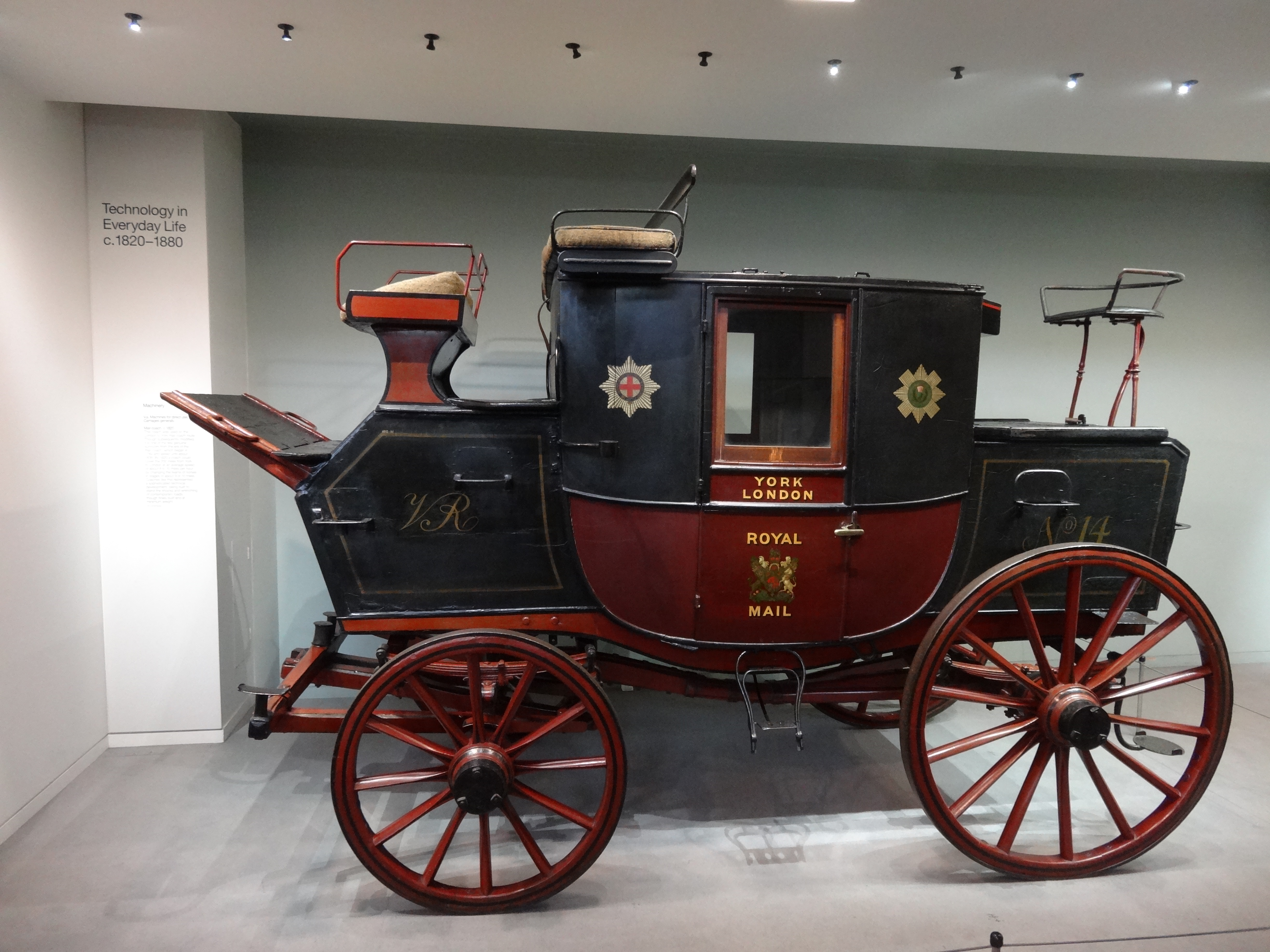
A mail coach

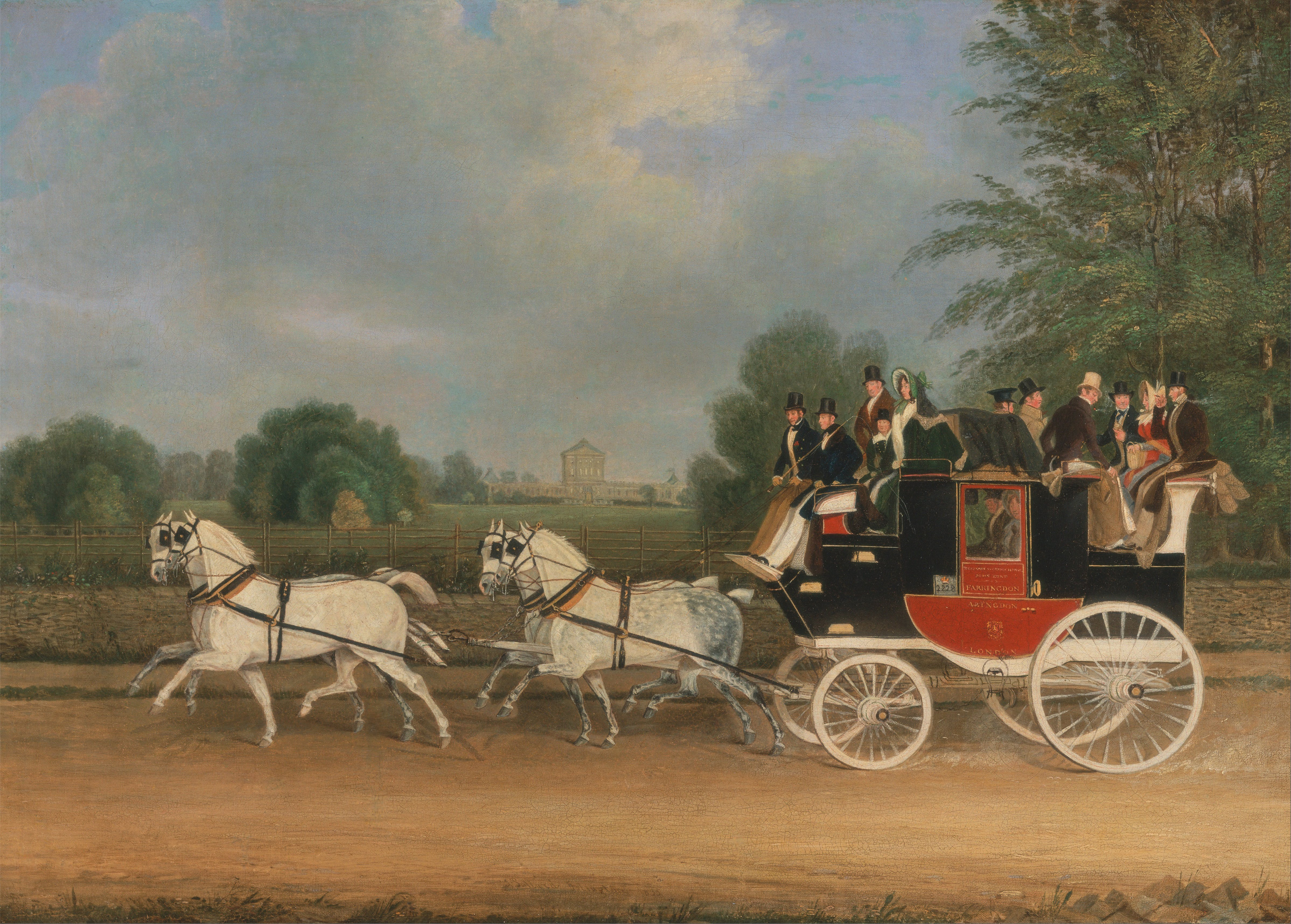
A road coach

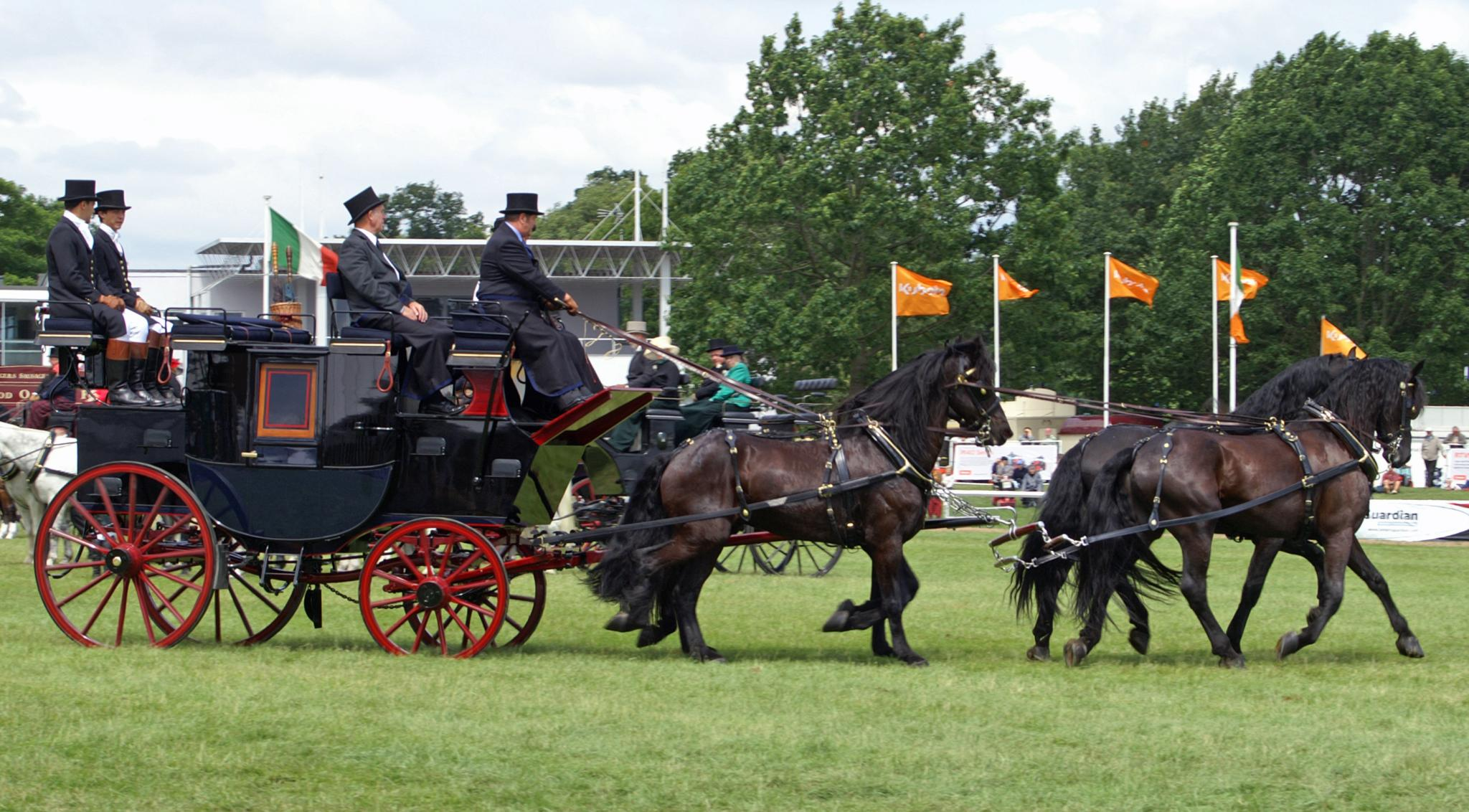
A drag

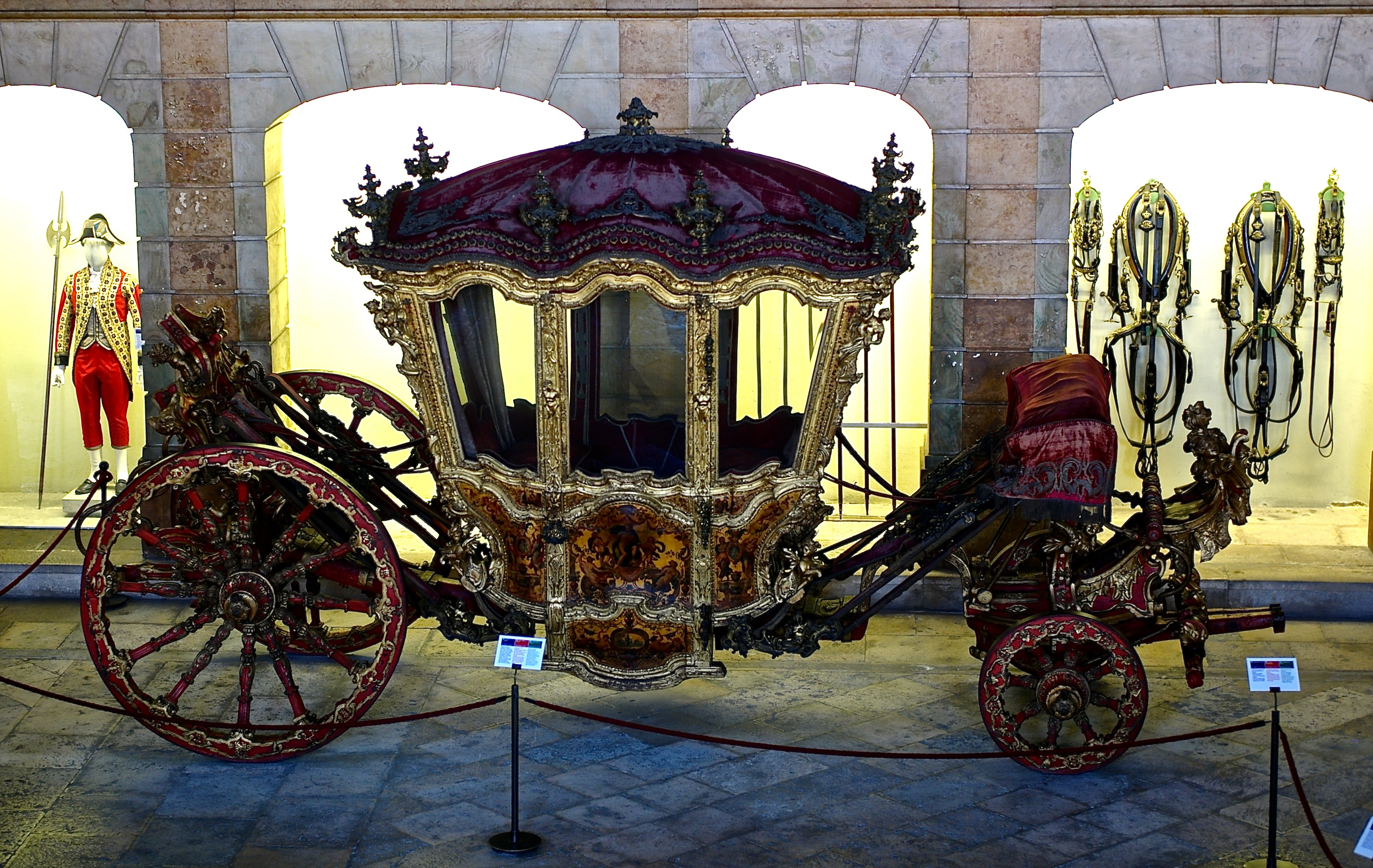
An early 18th century state coach

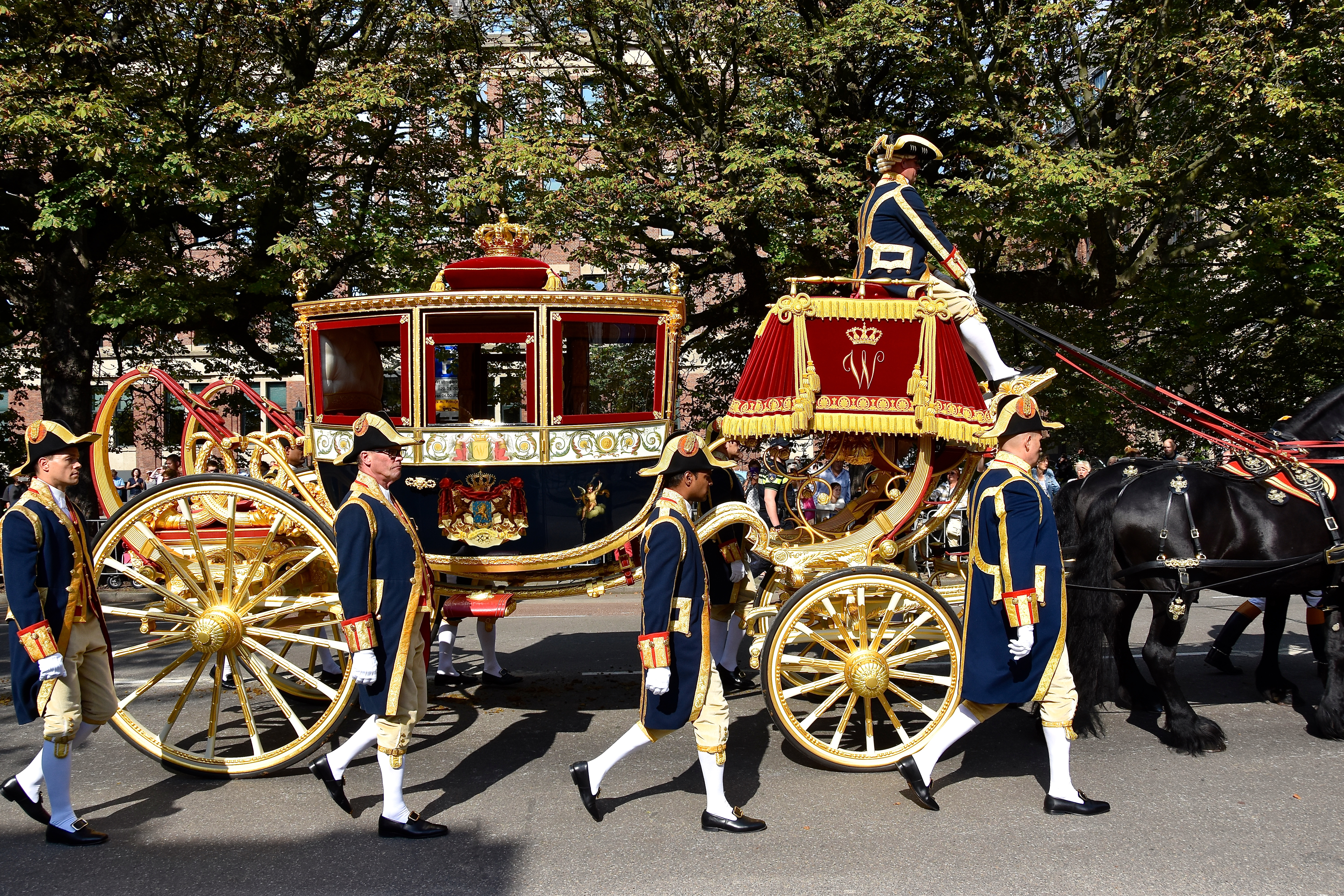
An 1820s state coach still in use today

== History ==
The coach was developed in Europe during the 15th and 16th centuries, with early examples associated with the Hungarian town of Kocs. By the late 16th century coaches had spread across the continent and were adopted in England, where they became a standard vehicle for aristocratic travel.

Early coaches were suspended on leather straps called thoroughbraces, but from the 17th century onward a variety of steel-spring systems were introduced, improving vehicle stability and passenger comfort. By the 18th century, coaches were widely used for both private and public travel, including long-distance stagecoach services. In the 19th century, the term "coach" was also applied to railway carriages, and later to motorcoaches, reflecting the decline of horse-drawn vehicles with the rise of rail and road transport.

As commercial road-coaching declined in the 19th century, aristocratic drivers adopted the style and techniques of the old mail coach and road coaches for sport, purchasing the decommissioned vehicles and leading to the development of the private drag, a lighter coach built for recreational outings and driven four-in-hand.

== Terminology ==
Kocs was the Hungarian post town in the 15th century onwards that gave its name to a fast light vehicle, which later spread across Europe. Therefore, the English word coach, the Spanish and Portuguese coche, the German Kutsche, the Slovak koč, Czech kočár, and Slovene kočija all probably derive from the Hungarian word "Kocsi", literally meaning "of Kocs".

Traveling by coach, or pleasure driving in a coach, is called coaching. The business of a coachman is to expertly direct and take all responsibility for a coach or carriage and its horses, their stabling, feeding and maintenance and the associated staff. A coachman holds a coachwhip with a long lash, and he might wear a box coat, a heavy overcoat with or without shoulder capes, in inclement weather. If driving a state coach, the coachman's seat would be covered with an ornamented fabric called a hammercloth. A guard on a horse-drawn coach is called a shooter. Instead of a coachman, a coach might be guided by postilion riders.

A coach might have a built-in compartment called a boot, used originally as a seat for the coachman and later for storage. A luggage case for the top of a coach is called an imperial; the top, roof or second-story compartment of a coach is also known as an imperial. The front and rear axles were connected by a main shaft called the perch or reach. A crossbar known as a splinter bar supported the springs.

A coach with four horses is a coach-and-four. A coach together with the horses, harness and attendants is a turnout. A cockhorse is an extra horse led behind a coach to be added to the hitch when an extra horse is needed in steep or hilly terrain.

A coach house is a special building for sheltering coaches, and a coaching inn or coaching house provided accommodation for travelers, and usually provided a change of horses and offered stabling.

== Coach-building ==
Coach-building had reached a high degree of specialization in Britain by the middle of the 19th century. Separate branches of the trade dealt with the timber, iron, leather, brass and other materials used. And there were many minor specialists within each of these categories. The "body-makers" produced the body or vehicle itself, while the "carriage-makers" made the stronger timbers beneath and around the body. The timbers used included ash, beech, elm, oak, mahogany, pine, birch and larch. The tools and processes were similar to those used in cabinet-making, plus others specific to coach-making. Making the curved woodwork alone called for considerable skill. Making the iron axles, springs and other metal used was the work of the "coach-smith," one of the most highly paid classes of workmen in London. Lining the interior of the coach with leather and painting, trimming, and decorating the exterior required the work of specialist tradesmen. Building carts and wagons involved similar skills, but of a coarser kind.

== Coach horses ==
A coach horse or coacher bred for drawing a coach is typically heavier than a saddle horse and exhibits good style and action. Breeds have included:

- Cleveland Bay
- Postier Breton: The lighter of the two subtypes of Breton
- German coach: large, rather coarse, harness horse; bay, brown or black in color.
- Hanoverian: developed by crossing heavy cold-blooded German horses with Thoroughbreds
- Holsteiner
- Oldenburger
- Percheron
- Yorkshire Coach Horse: large, strong, bay or brown; dark legs, mane and tail; derived largely from crossing Cleveland Bay horses with Thoroughbreds

== See also ==
- List of state coaches
- Horse-drawn vehicle
- Driving (horse)
- Glossary of carriage and driving terminology
- Bibliography of carriages and driving
