= Mounted Games Association of Great Britain =

Equestrian organisation

The Mounted Games Association of Great Britain is the governing body for mounted games in Great Britain. It was formed to allow riders to compete in mounted games past The Pony Club upper age limit of 14 years old. The association is one of the 16 organisations which form part of the British Equestrian Federation.

== History ==
Mounted games were the inspiration of Prince Philip, Duke of Edinburgh and were first played at the 1957 Horse of the Year Show. Rules of The Pony Club, which organised the events, stated that riders could be no older than 14

In 1984, Norman Patrick, chair of the Pony Club committee decided to form a group for riders wishing to participate in older age groups.

The popularity in the UK led to the formation of the International Mounted Games Association.
