= British Reining =

British Reining is the Great Britain governing body for the equestrian sport of reining. Reining is a recognised sport under the International Federation for Equestrian Sports and British Reining is responsible for selecting participants for Team GBR.

British Reining is one of the 16 organisations which form part of the British Equestrian Federation.

The BEF encourages members of other western riding sports to affiliate through BR.
