= Endurance GB =

UK governing body for equestrian endurance sport

Endurance GB is the governing body for endurance riding in Great Britain as well as organising over 100 affiliated events per year. It is one of the 16 organisations which form part of the British Equestrian Federation.
