= British Horseball Association =

The British Horseball Association is the governing body and organising organisation for the equestrian sport of horseball. The association is a member of the Federation of International Horseball and in the UK is one of the 16 organisations which form part of the British Equestrian Federation.

== Governance ==
The association was formed in the UK in 1991 as a limited company with a volunteer management.
