= British Equestrian Trade Association =

The British Equestrian Trade Association (BETA) is a membership organisation in the United Kingdom which represents manufacturers, wholesalers and retailers of goods for, and other businesses connected with, the equestrian market. It is one of the 16 organisations which form part of the British Equestrian Federation.

== History and scope ==
The association was formed in 1979 and currently has over 800 member companies.

== Governance ==
BETA is a company limited by guarantee, with member companies in six categories. From the member companies, the organisation is run by a council of 22, with representation from each category. The headquarters are situated west of Wetherby, off the A661, in Spofforth with Stockeld in North Yorkshire.

The categories of membership are:

- Retail - Shop premises or distance selling
- Trade - manufacturers and distributors
- Equine - dealers, equestrian establishments
- Agent - Third-party representatives
- Associate - Not directly equestrian related, but with close links to industry
- Overseas - Retail and Trade

== Research activity ==
BETA conducts regular research on behalf of its members, including on areas such as the number of riders in the United Kingdom and attitudes of riders towards spend in the sector.
