= British Carriagedriving =

Governing body for the sport of Horse Driving Trials

- Predecessor: British Horse Driving Trials Association
- Formation: 5 November 1996; 28 years ago
- Type: Sports governing body
- Affiliations: British Equestrian
- Website: britishcarriagedriving.co.uk

British Carriagedriving (BC), formerly known as British Horse Driving Trials Association (BHDTA), is the governing body for the sport of Horse Driving Trials in Great Britain. The association is responsible for the selection of Team GBR competitors to represent Great Britain at the World Carriage Driving Championships. It is one of the 18 organisations which form part of the British Equestrian Federation.

== History ==
The organization was incorporated on 5 November 1996 as the British Horse Driving Trials Association. The name was change in April 2013 to British Carriagedriving to align with the naming conventions of the other equine disciplines under British Equestrian.

== Administration ==
British Carriagedriving (BC) is administered by a council, consisting of a chairman, vice-chairman and nine elected Council members. These members serve for a period of three years, with the chair and vice-chair elected annually.

BC also appoints officials to run the day-to-day business of the association, including company secretary, executive officer, treasurer, bookkeeper, child protection officer and lead welfare officer.

The chairman and council also appoint a number of committees to facilitate operations within the organisation, with each of the committees being chaired by a council member. The committees are: finance & general purposes, competitions, rules, judges, training, and safety.

The company annual general meeting is held in October. It is combined with a one-day members' conference, where council officials present reports on the running and performance of the company and its financial status. This is followed by an open forum discussion.

== Notable members ==
Former members of the association include the Prince Philip, Duke of Edinburgh.

== See also ==
- British Equestrian
- International Federation for Equestrian Sports (FEI)
