= Individual driving at the 2014 FEI World Equestrian Games =

The individual combined driving at the 2014 World Equestrian Games in Normandy was held at La Prairie Race Course in Caen from 4 to 7 September.

Australia's Boyd Exell won gold medal, the country's only medal at the games. Chester Weber from the United States won silver while the bronze went to Theo Timmerman representing the Netherlands.

== Competition format ==
The team and individual driving competitions used the same scores. Driving consisted of dressage, marathon and obstacle-cone stages. Penalties from all of the stages were added up to determine the final results.

== Schedule ==
All times are Central European Summer Time (UTC+2)

Date	Time	Round
Thursday, 4 September 2014	09:00	Dressage (Day 1)
Friday, 5 September 2014	09:00	Dressage (Day 2)
Saturday, 6 September 2014	09:30	Marathon
Sunday, 7 September 2014	08:00	Obstacle Cone

== Results ==
=== Standings after dressage ===
Rank	Rider	Nation	Dressage	Total
1	Chester Weber	United States	32.21	32.21
2	Boyd Exell	Australia	35.51	35.51
3	Theo Timermann	Netherlands	37.28	37.28
4	IJsbrand Chardon	Netherlands	42.12	42.12
5	Koos de Ronde	Netherlands	46.25	46.25
6	Jószef Dobrowitz	Hungary	46.78	46.78
7	Christoph Sandmann	Germany	47.13	47.13
8	Zoltán Lázár	Hungary	47.84	47.84
9	Gert Schrijverse	Belgium	50.61	50.61
10	Michael Brauchle	Germany	50.85	50.85
11	Georg von Stein	Germany	50.91	50.91
12	Fredik Persson	Sweden	51.74	51.74
13	Stephane Chouzenoux	France	52.33	52.33
14	Ernesto Colman Mena	Uruguay	53.21	53.21
15	Edouard Simonet	Belgium	53.98	53.98
16	Werner Ulrich	Switzerland	54.39	54.39
17	Wilf-Bowman Ripley	Great Britain	54.80	54.80
18	Georgina Hunt	Great Britain	54.92	54.92
19	Benjamin Aillaud	France	55.16	55.16
20	Tomas Eriksson	Sweden	55.75	55.75
21	Alison Stroud	United States	56.10	56.10
22	Jiri Nesvacil Jr.	Czech Republic	56.51	56.51
23	Jószef Dobrowitz Jr.	Hungary	57.10	57.10
24	Glenn Geerts	Belgium	57.22	57.22
24	Juan Antonio Real Garcia	Spain	57.93	57.93
26	Misdee Wrigley-Miller	United States	58.05	58.05
27	Fabrice Martin	France	59.23	59.23
28	Francois Vogel	France	59.35	59.35
29	Sebastien Vincent	France	60.64	60.64
30	Toni Stofer	Switzerland	60.76	60.76
31	Thibault Coudry	France	61.06	61.06
32	Piotr Mazurek	Poland	62.18	62.18
33	Gavin Robson	Australia	62.36	62.36
34	Axel Olin	Sweden	62.89	62.89
35	Dick Lane	Great Britain	65.84	65.84
36	Jiri Nesvacil	Czech Republic	66.25	66.25
37	Manuel Campilho	Portugal	66.43	66.43
38	José Barranco Reyes	Spain	66.49	66.49
39	Miroslav Matuska	Slovakia	67.72	67.72
40	Juan Robles Marchena	Spain	68.08	68.08
41	Radek Nesvacil	Czech Republic	68.20	68.20
41	Ana Cristina Guerreiro	Portugal	68.20	68.20
43	Sebastien Mourier	France	69.14	69.14
44	Ireneusz Kozlowski	Poland	69.20	69.20
45	Carlo Mascheroni	Italy	71.21	71.21
46	Anthony Horde	France	72.50	72.50

=== Standings after Marathon ===
Rank	Rider	Nation	Dressage	Marathon	Total
1	Boyd Exell	Australia	35.51	90.32	125.83
2	Chester Weber	United States	32.21	96.39	128.60
3	Theo Timermann	Netherlands	37.28	96.60	133.88
4	IJsbrand Chardon	Netherlands	42.12	92.26	134.38
5	Christoph Sandmann	Germany	47.13	89.30	136.43
6	Koos de Ronde	Netherlands	46.25	91.53	137.78
7	Jószef Dobrowitz	Hungary	46.78	92.30	139.08
8	Georg von Stein	Germany	50.91	90.28	141.19
9	Michael Brauchle	Germany	50.85	94.67	145.52
10	Zoltán Lázár	Hungary	47.84	98.60	146.44
11	Fredik Persson	Sweden	51.74	97.11	148.85
12	Edouard Simonet	Belgium	53.98	95.56	149.54
13	Tomas Eriksson	Sweden	55.75	94.47	150.22
14	Gert Schrijverse	Belgium	50.61	102.53	153.14
15	Glenn Geerts	Belgium	57.22	95.93	153.15
16	Benjamin Aillaud	France	55.16	98.56	153.72
17	Jószef Dobrowitz Jr.	Hungary	57.10	96.71	153.81
18	Wilf-Bowman Ripley	Great Britain	54.80	99.71	154.51
19	Juan Antonio Real Garcia	Spain	57.93	102.52	160.45
20	Sebastien Mourier	France	69.14	91.87	161.01
21	Georgina Hunt	Great Britain	54.92	107.10	162.02
22	Thibault Coudry	France	61.06	102.29	163.35
23	Alison Stroud	United States	56.10	107.58	163.68
24	Stephane Chouzenoux	France	52.33	112.56	164.89
25	Sebastien Vincent	France	60.64	104.44	165.08
26	Axel Olin	Sweden	62.89	102.57	165.46
27	Ernesto Colman Mena	Uruguay	53.21	114.26	167.47
28	Jiri Nesvacil Jr.	Czech Republic	56.51	112.06	168.57
29	Francois Vogel	France	59.35	110.64	169.99
30	Piotr Mazurek	Poland	62.18	111.38	173.56
31	Fabrice Martin	France	59.23	115.09	174.32
32	Toni Stofer	Switzerland	60.76	115.80	176.56
33	Jiri Nesvacil	Czech Republic	66.25	112.75	179.00
34	Dick Lane	Great Britain	65.84	114.34	180.18
35	Anthony Horde	France	72.50	110.14	182.64
36	Ireneusz Kozlowski	Poland	69.20	114.78	183.98
37	José Barranco Reyes	Spain	66.49	120.57	187.06
38	Misdee Wrigley-Miller	United States	58.05	130.33	188.38
39	Gavin Robson	Australia	62.36	129.31	191.67
40	Juan Robles Marchena	Spain	68.08	133.77	201.85
41	Ana Cristina Guerreiro	Portugal	68.20	136.66	204.86
42	Carlo Mascheroni	Italy	71.21	144.64	215.85
43	Manuel Campilho	Portugal	66.43	156.49	222.92
-	Werner Ulrich	Switzerland	54.39	Eliminated	
-	Miroslav Matuska	Slovakia	67.72	Eliminated	
-	Radek Nesvacil	Czech Republic	68.20	Retired	

=== Final results ===
Rank	Rider	Nation	Dressage	Marathon	Obstacle-Cone	Total
1st place, gold medalist(s)	Boyd Exell	Australia	35.51	90.32	0.00	125.83
2nd place, silver medalist(s)	Chester Weber	United States	32.21	96.39	0.00	128.60
3rd place, bronze medalist(s)	Theo Timermann	Netherlands	37.28	96.60	0.00	133.88
4	IJsbrand Chardon	Netherlands	42.12	92.26	0.00	134.38
5	Christoph Sandmann	Germany	47.13	89.30	3.27	139.70
6	Koos de Ronde	Netherlands	46.25	91.53	2.25	140.03
7	Jószef Dobrowitz	Hungary	46.78	92.30	3.66	142.74
8	Georg von Stein	Germany	50.91	90.28	3.00	144.19
9	Michael Brauchle	Germany	50.85	94.67	3.00	148.52
10	Fredik Persson	Sweden	51.74	97.11	0.21	149.06
11	Edouard Simonet	Belgium	53.98	95.56	0.00	149.54
12	Zoltán Lázár	Hungary	47.84	98.60	3.95	150.39
13	Tomas Eriksson	Sweden	55.75	94.47	3.00	153.22
14	Jószef Dobrowitz Jr.	Hungary	57.10	96.71	0.00	153.81
15	Wilf-Bowman Ripley	Great Britain	54.80	99.71	0.00	154.51
16	Gert Schrijverse	Belgium	50.61	102.53	3.46	156.60
17	Benjamin Aillaud	France	55.16	98.56	3.07	156.79
18	Glenn Geerts	Belgium	57.22	95.93	7.97	161.12
19	Thibault Coudry	France	61.06	102.29	0.00	163.35
20	Juan Antonio Real Garcia	Spain	57.93	102.52	3.00	163.45
21	Sebastien Mourier	France	69.14	91.87	3.92	164.93
22	Stephane Chouzenoux	France	52.33	112.56	1.25	166.14
23	Jiri Nesvacil Jr.	Czech Republic	56.51	112.06	0.00	168.57
24	Georgina Hunt	Great Britain	54.92	107.10	6.79	168.81
25	Sebastien Vincent	France	60.64	104.44	5.13	170.21
26	Axel Olin	Sweden	62.89	102.57	6.95	172.41
27	Francois Vogel	France	59.35	110.64	3.08	173.07
28	Alison Stroud	United States	56.10	107.58	11.85	175.53
29	Fabrice Martin	France	59.23	115.09	6.00	180.32
30	Ernesto Colman Mena	Uruguay	53.21	114.26	13.12	180.59
31	Toni Stofer	Switzerland	60.76	115.80	6.31	182.87
32	Dick Lane	Great Britain	65.84	114.34	3.06	183.24
33	Anthony Horde	France	72.50	110.14	3.00	185.64
34	Jiri Nesvacil	Czech Republic	66.25	112.75	8.55	187.55
35	Piotr Mazurek	Poland	62.18	111.38	17.36	190.92
36	Ireneusz Kozlowski	Poland	69.20	114.78	8.17	192.15
37	Misdee Wrigley-Miller	United States	58.05	130.33	6.20	194.58
38	Gavin Robson	Australia	62.36	129.31	15.64	207.31
39	José Barranco Reyes	Spain	66.49	120.57	20.85	207.91
40	Juan Robles Marchena	Spain	68.08	133.77	8.73	210.58
41	Ana Cristina Guerreiro	Portugal	68.20	136.66	8.97	213.83
42	Carlo Mascheroni	Italy	71.21	144.64	14.14	229.99
43	Manuel Campilho	Portugal	66.43	156.49	13.53	236.45
