= 2022 FEI World Cup Finals (show jumping and dressage) =

Horse sport competition

- Host city: Leipzig, Germany
- Date(s): 6 April - 10 April, 2022
- Main stadium: Leipzig Trade Fair
- Level: Senior
- Type: Indoor
- Events: 2

The 2022 FEI World Cup Finals for both dressage and show jumping are scheduled to be held April 6-10, 2022 in Leipzig, Germany. The event is set to be held in the Leipzig Trade Fair and will mark the conclusion of the 2021-22 Dressage and Show jumping World Cup Seasons.

== Overview ==
Due to the COVID-19 pandemic, the 2020 FEI World Cup Finals in Las Vegas got cancelled. It was the first time that the FEI World Cup Finals got cancelled since their inclusion in 1978 for show jumping, and 1985 for dressage. The World Cup Finals were set to return the following year in Gothenburg, Sweden, however they also got cancelled on short notice, following the EHV-1 outbreak in Europe.

As with the previous season, the COVID-19 pandemic affected the 2021-22 World Cup Seasons in both dressage and jumping, with several qualifying events getting cancelled during the season. Amidst the event cancellations, FEI revised the World Cup Finals qualification rules in February 2022, allowing athletes to qualify with fewer number of results attained. The rule change controversially allowed Helen Langehanenberg to qualify over Frederic Wandres at the end of the Western European League for dressage. Wandres was the season's leader until the number of counting results was reduced from four to three.

Leipzig previously hosted the 2011 FEI World Cup Finals.

== Winners ==
=== Dressage Grand Prix Freestyle ===
Rank	Rider	Horse	GPF score	Notes
1st place, gold medalist(s)	(Germany) Jessica von Bredow-Werndl	TSF Dalera	90.836%	
2nd place, silver medalist(s)	(Denmark) Cathrine Dufour	Vamos Amigos	86.164%	
3rd place, bronze medalist(s)	(Germany) Isabell Werth	Weihegold OLD	85.921%	

=== Show jumping Final ===
Rank	Rider	Horse	Points
1st place, gold medalist(s)	(Switzerland) Martin Fuchs	Chaplin	65.11
2nd place, silver medalist(s)	(Austria) Max Kühner	Elektric Blue P	66.19
3rd place, bronze medalist(s)	(Republic of Ireland) Conor Swail	Count Me In	67.06

=== Driving ===
Rank	Rider	Horses	R1 Pen	R1 Time	R2 Pen	R2 Time	Total
1st place, gold medalist(s)	(Netherlands) Bram Chardon	Kendi; Favory Farao; Dreef Inca; Dreef Kapitany	4.000	132.330	4.000	118.390	258.720
2nd place, silver medalist(s)	(Australia) Boyd Exell	Bajnok; Neapolitano Nimrod; Barny 68; Rocket 123	0.000	132.420	4.000	122.620	262.820
3rd place, bronze medalist(s)	(Belgium) Glenn Geerts	Birckhouse Billie; De Solist; Erdball; Zeron	0.000	148.890	18.000	146.570	323.730

=== Vaulting Individual Female ===
Rank	Rider	Horse	R1 Score	R2 Score	Total
1st place, gold medalist(s)	(France) Manon Moutinho	Saitiri	8.237	8.624	8.431
2nd place, silver medalist(s)	(Germany) Janika Derks	Rockemotion	7.888	8.630	8.257
3rd place, bronze medalist(s)	(United States) Kimberly Palmer	Rosenstolz 99	7.644	8.373	8.009

=== Vaulting Individual Male ===
Rank	Rider	Horse	R1 Score	R2 Score	Total
1st place, gold medalist(s)	(Italy) Lorenzo Lupacchini	Rosenstolz 99	8.489	9.101	8.795
2nd place, silver medalist(s)	(France) Lambert Leclezio	Saitiri	8.785	8.471	8.628
3rd place, bronze medalist(s)	(Germany) Jannik Heiland	Rockemotion	7.442	8.595	8.019

=== Vaulting Pas-de-Deux ===
Rank	Riders	Horse	R1 Score	R2 Score	Total
1st place, gold medalist(s)	(Germany) Janika Derks / Johannes Kay	Humphrey Bogart Old	8.754	8.918	8.836
2nd place, silver medalist(s)	(Austria) Romana Hinter / Eva Nagiller	Dr. Grunow	7.577	8.455	8.016
3rd place, bronze medalist(s)	(Germany) Chiara Congia / Justin Van Gerven	Calidor 10	7.873	8.047	7.960
