= List of World Champions in Driving (horse) =

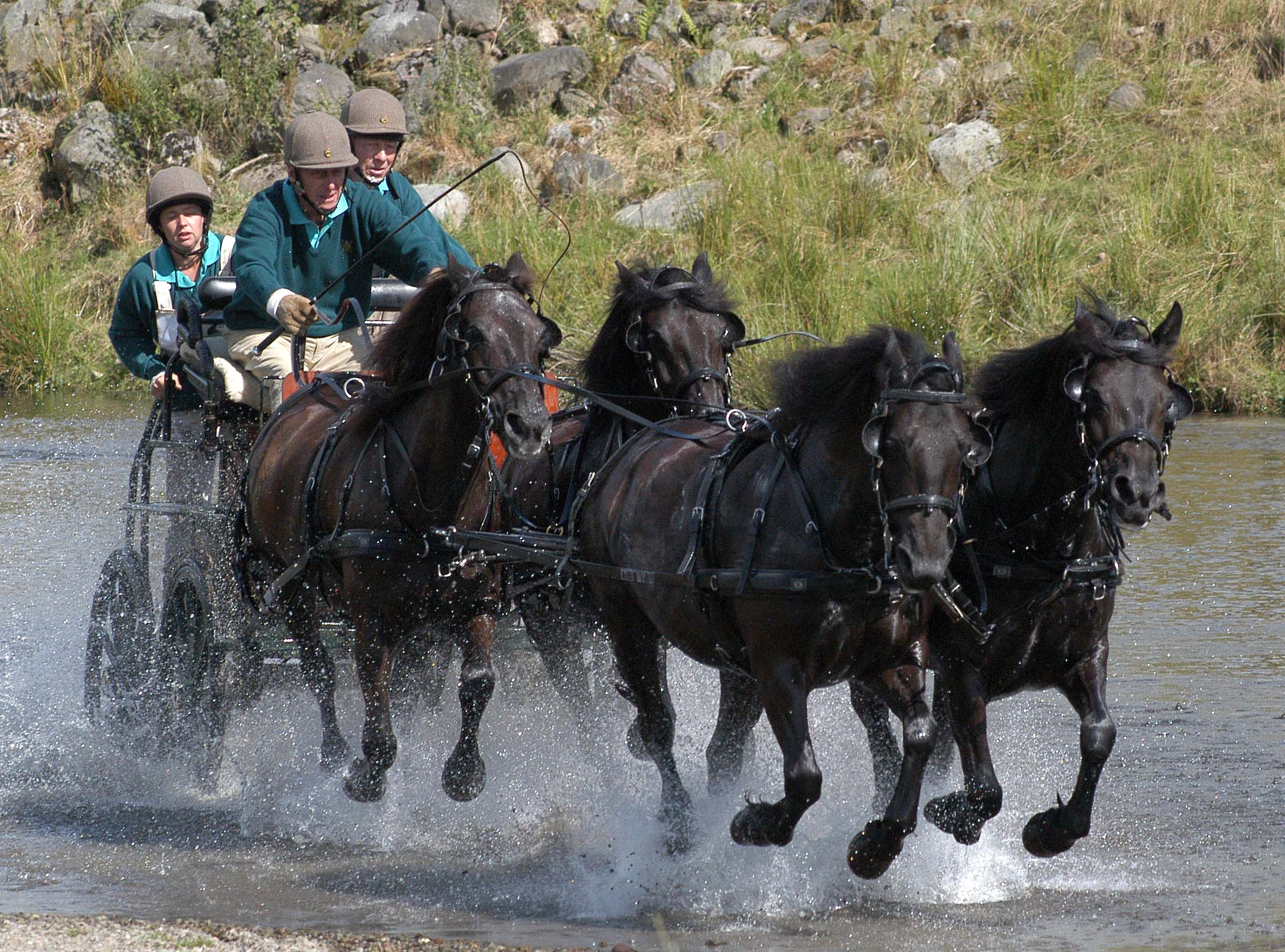
Prince Philip, part of the 1980 British four-in-hand gold medal-winning team

This List of World Champions in Driving includes Singles-, Pairs- and Four-in-Hand. Pony World driving Championships are mentioned as well.

== Four-in-Hand World Championships ==
The World Driving Championships for four-in-hand driving take place every two years. There will be an individual competition and a team competition for the national teams.

Year	Location	Winning team	Individual (Winner)	Individual (Second place)	Individual (Third place)
2026	Aachen, Germany	Netherlands	Boyd Exell (AUS)	Dries Degrieck (BEL)	Chester Weber (USA)
2024	Szilvasvarad, Hungary	Netherlands	Boyd Exell (AUS)	Bram Chardon (NED)	Chester Weber (USA)
2022	Pratoni del Vivaro, Italy	Netherlands	Boyd Exell (AUS)	IJsbrand Chardon (NED)	Michael Brauchle (GER)
2020	Kronenberg, Netherlands	Competition was canceled due to COVID-19			
WEG 2018	Tyron, NC, USA	United States	Boyd Exell (AUS)	Chester Weber (USA)	Edouard Simonet (BEL)
2016	Breda, Netherlands	Netherlands	Boyd Exell (AUS)	IJsbrand Chardon (NED)	Koos de Ronde (NED)
WEG 2014	Caen, France	Netherlands	Boyd Exell (AUS)	Chester Weber (USA)	Theo Timmerman (NED)
2012	Riesenbeck, Germany	Netherlands	Boyd Exell (AUS)	Chester Weber (USA)	IJsbrand Chardon (NED)
WEG 2010	Kentucky, USA	Netherlands	Boyd Exell (AUS)	IJsbrand Chardon (NED)	Tucker Johnson (USA)
2008	Beesd, Netherlands	Netherlands	IJsbrand Chardon (NED)	Chester Weber (USA)	Boyd Exell (AUS)
WEG 2006	Aachen, Germany	Germany	Félix-Marie Brasseur (BEL)	IJsbrand Chardon (NED)	Christoph Sandmann (GER)
2004	Kecskemet, Hungary	Hungary	Zoltán Lázár (HUN)	IJsbrand Chardon (NED)	Félix-Marie Brasseur (BEL)
WEG 2002	Jerez, Spain	Netherlands	IJsbrand Chardon (NED)	Christoph Sandmann (GER)	Tomas Eriksson (SWE)
2000	Wolfsburg, Germany	Sweden	Tomas Eriksson (SWE)	IJsbrand Chardon (NED)	Michael Freund (GER)
WEG 1998	Pratoni del Vivaro, Italy	Netherlands	Werner Ulrich (SUI)	Michael Freund (GER)	Ton Monhemius (NED)
1996	Waregem, Belgium	Belgium	Félix-Marie Brasseur (BEL)	George Bowman (GBR)	József Bozsik (HUN)
WEG 1994	The Hague, Netherlands	Germany	Michael Freund (GER)	George Bowman (GBR)	IJsbrand Chardon (NED)
1992	Riesenbeck, Germany	Germany	IJsbrand Chardon (NED)	Hanspeter Rüschlin (SUI)	Christoph Sandmann (GER)
WEG 1990	Stockholm, Sweden	Sweden	Tomas Eriksson (SWE)	József Bozsik (HUN)	IJsbrand Chardon (NED)
1988	Apeldoorn, Netherlands	Netherlands	IJsbrand Chardon (NED)	Christer Pålsson (SWE)	József Bozsik (HUN)
1986	Ascot, UK	Netherlands	Tjeerd Velstra (NED)	IJsbrand Chardon (NED)	Laszlo Juhasz (HUN)
1984	Szilvasvarad, Hungary	Hungary	Laszlo Juhasz (HUN)	Gyorgy Bardos (HUN)	M. Balint (HUN)
1982	Apeldoorn, Netherlands	Netherlands	Tjeerd Velstra (NED)	Gyorgy Bardos (HUN)	Laszlo Juhasz (HUN)
1980	Windsor, UK	United Kingdom	Gyorgy Bardos (HUN)	George Bowman (GBR)	Tjeerd Velstra (NED)
1978	Kecskemet, Hungary	Hungary	Gyorgy Bardos (HUN)	Sandor Fulop (HUN)	Ferenc Muity (HUN)
1976	Apeldoorn, Netherlands	Hungary	Imre Abonyi (HUN)	Emil-Bernhard Jung (GER)	Zygmunt Waliszewski (POL)
1974	Frauenfeld, Switzerland	United Kingdom	Sandor Fulop (HUN)	Cristian Iseli (SUI)	George Bowman (GBR)
1972	Münster, Germany	United Kingdom	Auguste Dubey (SUI)	John Miller (GBR)	Douglas Nicholson (GBR)

== Pairs World Championships ==
The World Driving Championships for pairs take place every two years. There is an individual competition and a team competition for the national teams.

Year	Location	Winning team	Individual (Winner)	Individual (Second place)	Individual (Third place)
2025	Beekbergen, Netherlands	Hungary	Martin Hölle (HUN)	Roger Campbell (GBR)	Stan van Eijk (NED)
2023	Le Pin-au-Haras, France	Hungary	Martin Hölle (HUN)	Marcel Luder (SUI)	Erik Evers (NED)
2021	Kronenberg, Netherlands	Hungary	Martin Hölle (HUN)	Franck Grimonprez (FRA)	Anna Sandmann (GER)
2019	Drebkau, Germany	Hungary	Martin Hölle (HUN)	Sandro Koalick (GER)	Stan van Eijk (NED)
2017	Lipica, Slovenia	Hungary	Martin Hölle (HUN)	Sebastian Warneck (GER)	Beat Schenk (SUI)
2015	Fábiánsebestyén, Hungary	Hungary	Vilmos Lázár (HUN)	Zoltán Lázár (HUN)	Jozsef Dibak (ITA)
2013	Topoľčianky, Slovakia	Hungary	Vilmos Lázár (HUN)	Sebastian Warneck (GER)	Zoltán Lázár (HUN)
2011	Conty, France	Netherlands	Carola Diener (GER)	Stéphane Chouzenoux (FRA)	Tom Engbers (NED)
2009	Kecskemet, Hungary	Netherlands	Harrie Verstappen (NED)	Beat Schenk (SUI)	Zoltán Lázár (HUN)
2007	Warka, Poland	Germany	Vilmos Lázár (HUN)	Sebastian Warneck (GER)	Károly Hódi (HUN)
2005	Wals-Salzburg, Austria	Austria	Rainer Pointl (AUT)	Károly Hódi (HUN)	Vilmos Lázár (HUN)
2003	Haras de Jardy, France	Hungary	Riny Rutjens (NED)	Pierre Jung (FRA)	Roman Kusz (POL)
2001	Riesenbeck, Germany	Hungary	Vilmos Lázár (HUN)	Frederico de Beck (POR)	Zoltan Nyul (HUN)
1999	Kecskemet, Hungary	Hungary	Vilmos Lázár (HUN)	Zoltán Lázár (HUN)	Zoltan Nyul (HUN)
1997	Riesenbeck, Germany	United Kingdom	Zoltán Lázár (HUN)	Riny Rutjens (NED)	Matthias Jürgen (GER)
1995	Poznań, Poland	France	Mieke van Tergouw (NED)	Schepper Horst (GER)	Patrick Greffer (FRA)
1993	Gladstone, New Jersey, USA	Austria	Georg Moser (AUT)	Vilmos Lázár (HUN)	Horst Schepper (GER)
1991	Zwettl, Austria	United States	Werner Ulrich (SUI)	Eckhard Meyer (GER)	Roman Kutz (POL)
1989	Balatonfenyves, Hungary	Hungary	Udo Hochgeschurz (CAN)	Werner Ulrich (SUI)	Feher Mihaly (HUN)
1987	Riesenbeck, Germany	Germany	Laszlo Kecskemeti (HUN)	Rajmund Wodkowski (POL)	Ekkert Meinecke (GER)
1985	Sandringham, UK	Switzerland	Ekkert Meinecke (GER)	Merk Heiner (SUI)	de Leewn (NED)

== Singles World Championships ==
The singles World Championships take place every second year. There is an individual and a team competition.

Year	Location	Winning team	Individual (Winner)	Individual (Second place)	Individual (Third place)
2024	Le Pin-au-Haras, France	France	Mario Gandolfo (SUI)	Marion Vignaud (FRA)	Stefan Ulrich (SUI)
2022	Le Pin-au-Haras, France	France	Saskia Siebers (NED)	Marion Vignaud (FRA)	Kelly Bruder (CAN)
2020	Pau, France	Netherlands	Saskia Siebers (NED)	Kelly Houtapples-Bruder (CAN)	Bartlomiej Kwiatek (POL)
2018	Kronenberg, Netherlands	Netherlands	Bartlomiej Kwiatek (POL)	Saskia Siebers (NED)	Marion Vignaud (FRA)
2016	Piber, Austria	Germany	Dieter Lauterbach (GER)	Weronika Kwiatek (POL)	Saskia Siebers (NED)
2014	Izsák, Hungary	Germany	Wilbron Van Den Broek (NED)	Claudia Lauterbach (GER)	Marlen Fallak (GER)
2012	Companhia das Lezírias, Portugal	Germany	Christoph Dieker (GER)	Michael Barbey (SUI)	Wilbrord van den Broek (NED)
2010	Pratoni del Vivaro, Italy	Germany	Thorsten Zarembowicz (NED)	Bartek Kwiatek (POL)	Cristiano Cividini (ITA)
2008	Jarantow, Poland	France	Jan van den Broek (NED)	Anne-Violaine Brisou (FRA)	Jan Moonen (NED)
2006	Pratoni del Vivaro, Italy	United Kingdom	Paul Sidwell (GBR)	Cecilia Qvarnstrom (SWE)	Dieter Lauterbach (GER)
2004	Åstorp, Sweden	Sweden	Marie Kahrle (SWE)	Jan van den Broek (NED)	Ben Simonsen (FIN)
2002	Conty, France	Sweden	Stéphane Chouzenoux (FRA)	Marie Kahrle (SWE)	Fred Merriam (USA)
2000	Gladstone, New Jersey, USA	The competition was cancelled because of a viral disease			
1998	Fohlenhof Ebbs, Austria	Sweden	Arja Mikkonen (FIN)	Cecilia Qvarnstrom (SWE)	Rudolf Pirhofer (AUT)

== Pony World Championships ==
The Pony World Driving Championships take place every two years. There are individual competitions for singles, pairs and four-in-hand. The teams from the various categories are evaluated together for the team ranking. Two single, two pair and two four-in-hand results per nation are included in the ranking.

Year	Location	Winning team	Singles (Winner)	Pairs (Winner)	Four-in-Hand (Winner)
2025	Le Pin-au-Haras, France	Netherlands	Tobias Bücker (GER)	Rodinde Rutjens (NED)	Marijke Hammink (NED)
2023	Oirschot, Netherlands	Netherlands	Cedric Scherrer (SUI)	Rodinde Rutjens (NED)	Marijke Hammink (NED)
2021	Le Pin-au-Haras, France	Netherlands	Cédric Scherrer (SUI)	Rodinde Rutjens (NED)	Marijke Hammink (NED)
2019	Kisbér-Ászár, Hungary	Germany	Katja Berlage (GER)	Rodinde Rutjens (NED)	Steffen Brauchle (GER)
2017	Minden, Germany	Germany	Marlena Brenner (GER)	Tara Wilkinson (GBR)	Michael Bügener (GER)
2015	Breda, Netherlands	Netherlands	Fabian Ganshirt (GER)	Anna Grayston (GBR)	Bram Chardon (NED)
2013	Pau, France	Netherlands	Martin Holle (HUN)	Ewoud Boom (NED)	Bram Chardon (NED)
2011	Lipica, Slovenia	Germany	Kristina Klindt (DEN)	Dieter Baackmann (GER)	Bram Chardon (NED)
2009	Greven-Bockholt, Germany	Germany	Melanie Becker (NED)	Daniel Schneiders (GER)	Tobias Bücker (GER)
2007	Dorthealyst, Denmark	Germany	Peter Koux (DEN)	Miranda Cadwell (USA)	Jan de Boer (NED)
2005	Catton, United Kingdom	Germany	Suzy Stafford (USA)	Steffen Abicht (GER)	Dirk Gerkens (GER)
2003	Karlstetten, Austria	Germany	Tobias Bücker (GER)	Steffen Abicht (GER)	Dirk Gerkens (GER)

== See also ==
- Combined driving § FEI World Cup
