= 2011 FEI World Cup Finals =

Horse sport competition

The 2011 FEI World Cup Finals in Leipzig, Germany were the Final of four World Cups in different Equestrian sports. They were held in the exhibition halls 1 and 3 at the new Leipzig Trade Fair from April 27 to May 1, 2011.

First time ever four horse sport World Cup Finals was held at the same place.

== Horse sport in Leipzig ==
Since 1998 the new Leipzig Trade Fair is the location of “Partner Pferd“, a trade fair around the horse and a horse show with show jumping and dressage competitions.

First time in 2008 Vaulting competitions are part of the “Partner Pferd“. From 2001 to 2007 also Reining horse show, called “ L.E. Grand Open”, are part of the “Partner Pferd“ Leipzig.

Trade fair and horse show held usually each year in January. In 2011 these events were moved to the end of April.

== Disciplines at the World Cup Finals ==
Competitions in four equestrian disciplines are part of the FEI World Cup Finals 2011. The finals of the following international series are part of this horse show:

- Dressage:
  - Reem Acra FEI World Cup Dressage 2010/2011
- Show jumping:
  - Rolex FEI World Cup Jumping 2010/2011
  - European Youngster Cup, series for show jumpers up to the age of 25
- Four-in-hand driving:
  - FEI World Cup Driving 2010/2011
- Vaulting:
  - FEI World Cup Vaulting 2010/2011

At the same time held an international show jumping horse show (CSI 3*) and finals of national series at the “Partner Pferd“ 2011.

== Winners ==
=== Dressage Grand Prix ===
At the evening of April 28, 2011 the Grand Prix de Dressage was held. It was the first competition of the Dressage World Cup final.

Placings	Rider	Horse	Percentage
1	(Netherlands) Adelinde Cornelissen	Parzival	80.957 %
2	(Denmark) Nathalie of Sayn-Wittgenstein-Berleburg	Digby	76.884 %
3	(Germany) Ulla Salzgeber	Herzruf´s Erbe	76.216 %

=== Dressage Grand Prix Freestyle (Final) ===
The second competition of the Dressage World Cup final is the Grand Prix Freestyle, held at the evening of Saturday, April 30. The winner of the Grand Prix Freestyle will be the World Cup Champion of the 2010/2011 season.

Placings	Rider	Horse	Percentage
1	(Netherlands) Adelinde Cornelissen	Parzival	84,804 %
2	(Denmark) Nathalie of Sayn-Wittgenstein-Berleburg	Digby	80,036 %
3	(Germany) Ulla Salzgeber	Herzruf´s Erbe	78,821 %

=== Show jumping final I ===
The first competition of the Show Jumping World Cup Final, a speed and handiness competition, was held at Thursday afternoon (April 28, 2011). The result of this competition was converted into faults for the World Cup Final standings.

Placings	Rider	Horse	Time	World Cup Points (only from the World Cup Final)
1	(Germany) Marco Kutscher	Cash	63.55 s + 0 Penalty s. = 63.55	44
2	(Germany) Marcus Ehning	Sabrina	63.79 s + 0 Penalty s. = 63.79	42
3	(Germany) Christian Ahlmann	Taloubet Z	64.03 s + 0 Penalty s. = 64.03	41

=== Show jumping final II ===
At April 29 afternoon the second competition of the Show Jumping World Cup Final, a show jumping competition with one jump-off, was held. After the second round, the World Cup Points were converted in Penalties for the Final III.

Placings	Rider	Horse	Round 1		Jump-off		World Cup Points (only from the World Cup Final)
Placings	Rider	Horse	Penalties	Time (s)	Penalties	Time (s)	World Cup Points (only from the World Cup Final)
1	(Canada) Eric Lamaze	Hickstead	0	-	0	40.68	44
2	(Germany) Christian Ahlmann	Taloubet Z	0	-	0	40.86	42
3	(Netherlands) Gerco Schröder	New Orleans	0	-	0	44.77	41

=== Show jumping final III ===
The third competition of this final was held at May 1, 2011 afternoon. It was a competition over two different rounds, both not against the clock. Here only the 30 best placed riders have the chance to start in this competition.

Placings	Rider	Horse	Round 1	Round 2	Total
Placings	Rider	Horse	Penalties	Penalties	Penalties
1	(United States) Beezie Madden	Coral Reef Via Volo	0	0	0
1	(Netherlands) Jeroen Dubbeldam	Simon	0	0	0
3	(United States) Margie Engle	Indigo	0	4	4
3	(United States) McLain Ward	Antares F	0	4	4
3	(Switzerland) Pius Schwizer	Carlina	4	0	4
3	(France) Kevin Staut	Silvana	4	0	4
3	(Canada) Eric Lamaze	Hickstead	0	4	4
3	(Germany) Christian Ahlmann	Taloubet Z	4	0	4

=== Show jumping final standings ===
The competitor with the smallest number of faults in the World Cup Final standings will be the World Cup Champion of the 2010/2011 season.

Placings	Rider	Horse/ Horses	Final I	Final II	World Cup Points (only from Final I and Final II) TOTAL	World Cup Points, converted in Penalties	Final III		Penalties (Total)
Placings	Rider	Horse/ Horses	World Cup Points	World Cup Points	World Cup Points (only from Final I and Final II) TOTAL	World Cup Points, converted in Penalties	Penalties	Penalties	Penalties (Total)
1	(Germany) Christian Ahlmann	Taloubet Z	41	42	83	0	4	0	4
2	(Canada) Eric Lamaze	Hickstead	27	44	71	6	0	4	10
3	(Netherlands) Jeroen Dubbeldam	Simon	37	24	61	11	0	0	11

=== European Youngster Cup-Super Final (show jumping) ===
At Friday morning (April 29, 2011) the “Super Final“ of the European Youngster Cup (EY-Cup) season 2010 was held. It was a show jumping competition with one jump-off for riders up to the age of 26. The chance to start in this final had:

- the best riders of the regular Final of the European Youngster Cup 2010 at the CSI 4* Frankfurt
- the four most successful riders of qualifying competitions in the United States
- the Winner of the Grand Prix of the “Salut-Festival” Aachen (one of the most important show jumping event for young riders in Germany)

Placings	Rider	Horse	Round 1		Jump-off	
Placings	Rider	Horse	Penalties	Time (s)	Penalties	Time (s)
1	(Germany) Marie Lütgenau	Strolchi	0	-	0	39.30
2	(Germany) Tim Brüggemann	Corio Star	0	-	0	40.19
3	(Luxembourg) Charlotte Bettendorf	Kiwi du Gibet	0	-	0	41.47

=== Show jumping Grand Prix (CSI 3*) ===
Also a CSI 3* are held at the “Partner Pferd“ 2011. The Grand Prix of this show jumping horse show was held at the afternoon of Saturday, April 30, 2011. It was a show jumping competition with one jump-off. The fences was up to 1.55 meters.

Placings	Rider	Horse	Round 1		Jump-off	
Placings	Rider	Horse	Penalties	Time (s)	Penalties	Time (s)
1	(Republic of Ireland) Denis Lynch	All Inclusive NRW	0	-	0	38.10
2	(Republic of Ireland) Billy Twomey	Romanov	0	-	0	38.24
3	(United States) McLain Ward	Rothchild	0	-	0	38.37

=== Driving ===
After several World Cup competitions several drivers had the chance to start in the World Cup Final: The last time the Driving World Cup Final was held in Leipzig was in 2008.

First competition

The first competition of the Driving World Cup final was held on April 29, 2011 and was a timed obstacle driving competition.

Placings	Driver	Time (s)
1	(Australia) Boyd Exell	125.63
2	(Sweden) Tomas Eriksson	129.53
3	(Netherlands) Koos de Ronde	140.08

Second competition

The second competition of the Four-in-hand Driving World Cup final was held on May 1, 2011 and was a timed obstacle driving with two rounds. The winner of this second competition, Boyd Exell, was the World Cup Champion of the 2010/2011 season.

Placings	Driver	Time (s) round 1	Time (s) total
1	(Australia) Boyd Exell	-	242.12
2	(Hungary) József Dobrovitz	-	247.52
3	(Netherlands) IJsbrand Chardon	-	254.88

=== Vaulting ===
The 2010/2011 Vaulting World Cup season was a test season, the first World Cup season ever in Vaulting history.

The World Cup Final consists of two freestyle competitions. Both competitions was held separated by gender. The first competition was held at Friday midday (April 29, 2011), the second competition at Saturday midday (April 30, 2011). The vaulter with the best average of both competition results is the World Cup Champion of the 2010/2011 season.

Women's vaulting results

	Vaulter Longeur	Horse	Percentage round 1	Percentage round 2	Total percentage
1	(Germany) Simone Wiegele; Agnes Werhahn	Arkansas	8.320	8.613	8.467
2	(Germany) Antje Hill; Agnes Werhahn	Arkansas	8.246	8.233	8.240
3	(Italy) Anna Cavallaro; Nelson Vidoni	Harley	7.533		7.623

Men's vaulting results

	Vaulter Longeur	Horse	Percentage round 1	Percentage round 2	Total percentage
1	(Switzerland) Patric Looser; Alexandra Knauf	Record RS von der Wintermühle	8.626	8.793	8.710
2	(France) Nicolas Andréani; Maina Jooten Dupont	Idefix de Braize	8.780	8.246	8.513
3	(Germany) Viktor Brüsewitz; Irina Lenkert	Airbus	8,080		8.017
