= Carlo Mascheroni =

Italian equestrian and sportsman (born 1940)

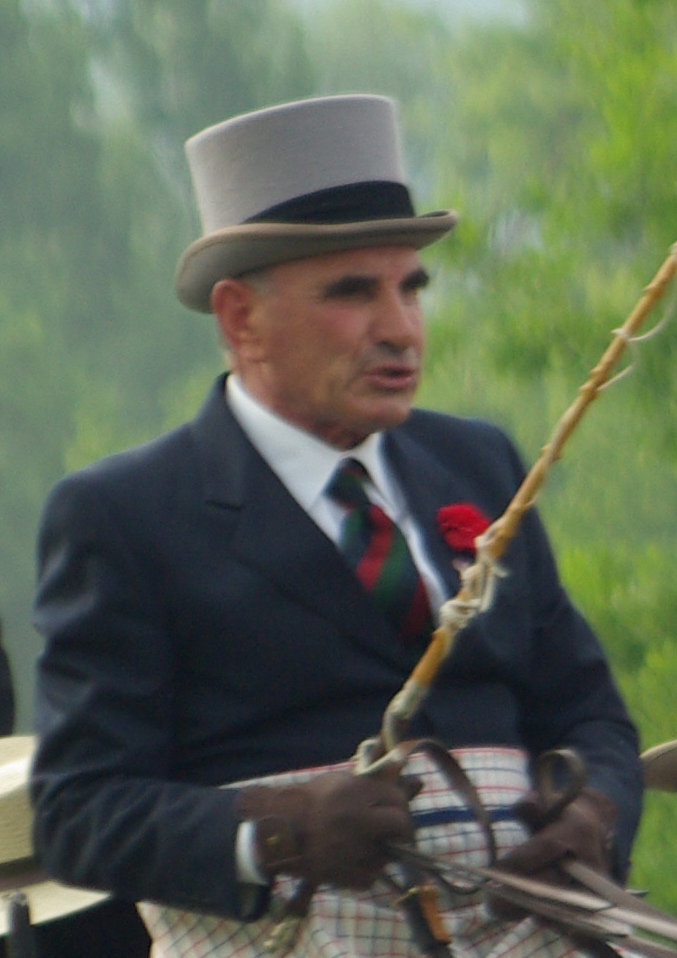

Personal information
- Nationality: Italy
- Discipline: Horse Driving
- Born: 7 June 1940 (age 86)

Carlo Mascheroni (born 7 June 1940 in Giussano) is an Italian equestrian and sportsman who competes at the international level in horse-driving (single, pairs and four-in-hand).

== Biography ==
Mascheroni was born in Giussano into a family of saddlers. Since 1898, his grandfather Carlo and his father Ugo have produced handcrafted leather harnesses and goods.

Nine-time Italian champion in driving, Mascheroni represented Italy at the World Equestrian Games (WEG) in four-in-hand driving several times, including 1994 in the Netherlands, 1998 in Italy, 2002 in Spain, and 2006 in Germany. He won his first international driving competition in Rome at the 1982 CSIO Passo Corese.

Based in Giussano (near Milan), Italy, Mascheroni owns a saddlery and collects antique carriages, leather harnesses, harness goods and accessories.

== Awards ==
Gold medals at the Italian Championship in driving pairs:

- 1977 Parco di Monza
- 1980 Crema (Crema)
- 1986 Cislago (Varese)
- 1992 Soiano (Bergamo), Cigliano (BG) and Oreno di Vimercate
- 2002 Oreno di Vimercate (Mi)
- 2004 San Rossore (Pisa)
- 2005 Pratoni del Vivaro (Rome)

Mascheroni began competing in combined driving in 1984, and has competed every year since with pairs and teams. He has participated in every World Pairs Championship from 1985 to 2001, and in every World Teams Championship since 1994. In the Coupe Danube, he represented Italian driving for the rest of Europe. Mascheroni uses a Kühnle Sport Phaeton carriage.

== International results ==
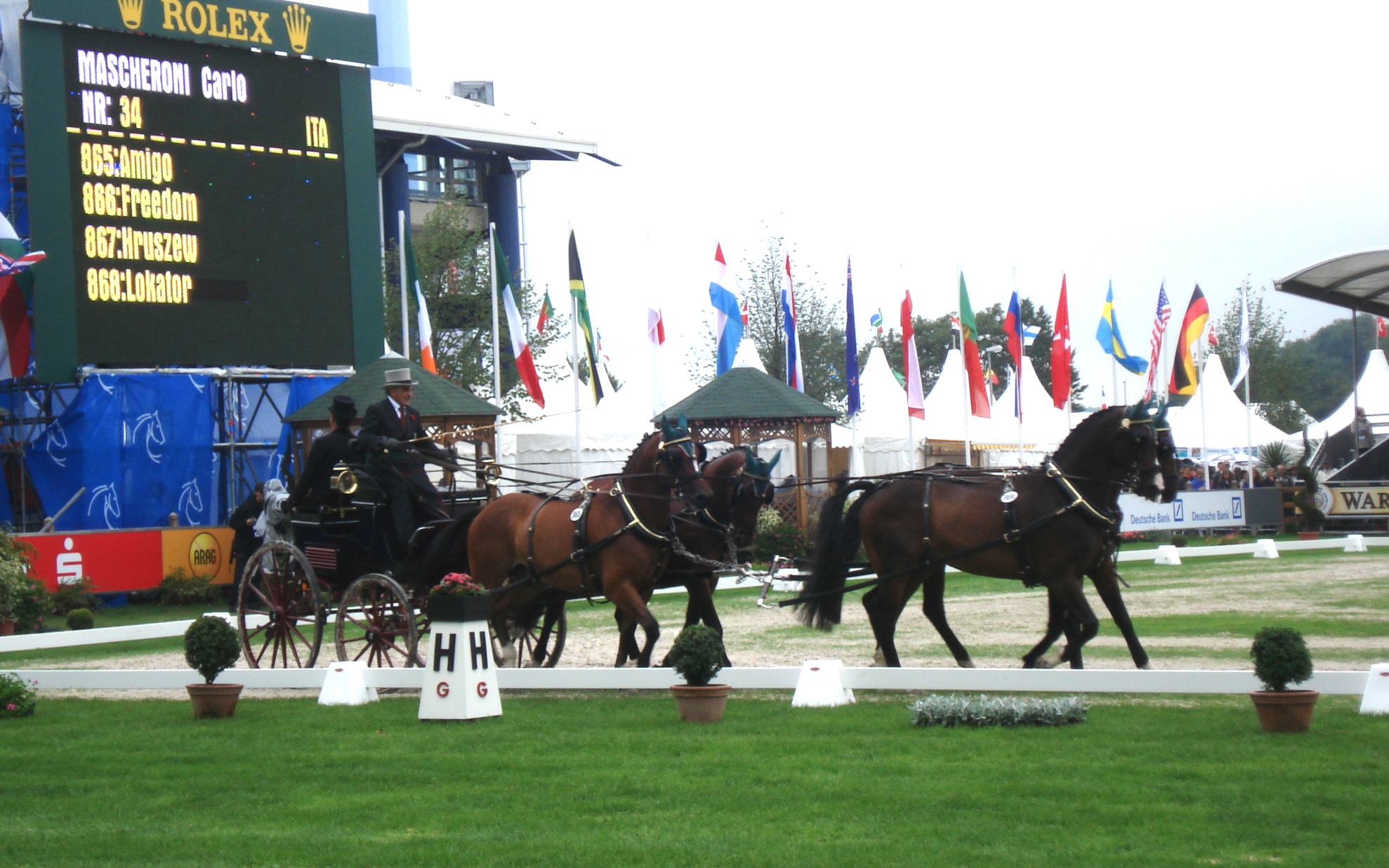
Mascheroni at Aachen

- 2006 CAI-A/B/CAIP- München-Riem ‘06 (Ger) 4 2 3 6 with horse team
- 2006 CAI-A Altenfelden ‘06 (Aut) 12 9 13 13 with horse team
- 2005 CAI-A/CAIP-A Weer ‘05 (Aut) 26 26 29 22 with horse pair
- 2005 CAI-A Conty ‘05 (Fra) 11 19 8 7 with horse pair
- 2004 CAI-A Nebanice ‘04 (Cze) - 6 - - with horse team
- 2004 CAI-A Weer ‘04 (Aut) 2 1 2 3 with horse team
- 2004 CAI-A Altenfelden ‘04 (Aut) 12 7 12 2 with horse team
- 2003 CAI-B Oreno di Vimercate ‘03 (Ita) 7 4 3 14 with horse pair
- 2003 CAI-A Weer ‘03 (Aut) 5 11 7 2 with horse pair
- 2003 CAI-A Altenfelden ‘03 (Aut) 18 18 30 14 with horse pair
- 2002 CAI-A Karlstetten ‘02 (Aut) - 43 EL 43 with horse pair
- 2002 CAI-A Riesenbeck ‘02 (Ger) 25 25 26 22 with horse team
- 2002 CAI-A/CAIP-A Weer ‘02 (Aut) 6 6 7 1 with horse team
- 2002 CAI-A Altenfelden ‘02 (Aut) 9 9 AB 5 with horse team
- 2001 CAI-A 1/2 Verona ’01 (Ita) 6 13 with horse pair
- 2000 CAI-B Aosta '00 (Ita) 1 1 1 1 (only competitor)
- 1999 CAI St. Gallen ‘99 (Sui) - AB with horse team
- 1998 CAI Riesenbeck ‘98 (Ger) 30 with horse team
- 1998 CAI Compiegne ‘98 (Fra) - with horse team
- 2005 Wals-Siezenheim ‘05 (Aut) 52 67 39 30
- 2004 Kecskemét ‘04 (Hun) - 39 - 47
- 2002 Jerez de la Frontera ‘02 (Esp) - 43 39 EL with horse team
- 2001 Riesenbeck '01 (Ger) 57 58 - 57-member Italian team (19th place)
- 2000 Wolfsburg '00 (Ger) 48 50 47 with horse team
- 1998 Rome ‘98 (Ita) 35 with horse team
- 1996 Waregem ‘96 (Bel) 34-member Italian team (10th place)
- 1994 The Hague ‘94 (Ned) EL

World Championship horse team:

- Hruszew 15 (Polish gelding)
- Lokator 12 (Polish gelding)
- Mayor 13 (gelding)
- Lisander 11 (NN gelding)
- Amigo 11 (GBR gelding)
- Freedom 10 Hanoverian stallion)

== Bibliography ==
- Paolo Manili, Carlo Mascheroni: l'uomo dei cavalli e delle carrozze

== Sources ==
- "Athlete Performance"
- "And the oldest athlete at #WEG2014 is a 74-year-old driver, Carlo Mascheroni from Italy"
- "In carrozza alla corte di «re Carlo» - ilGiornale.it"
- "Cronaca Archives - Il Cittadino di Monza e Brianza"
- "Mascheroni si prepara con il suo tiro a quattro"
- "Person Detail"
- "Regione Lombardia"
- "Regione Lombardia"
- "Premio “Negozi storici”: riconoscimenti anche a 4 realtà brianzole"
- "Mascheroni riceve Premio Attività Storica da Regione Lombardia"
- "Negozi storici in Lombardia, ecco gli esercizi premiati in ogni provincia"
- "Moda, sport e equitazione: Mascheroni eccellenza lombarda 'doc'"
