= Christoph Sandmann =

German equestrian

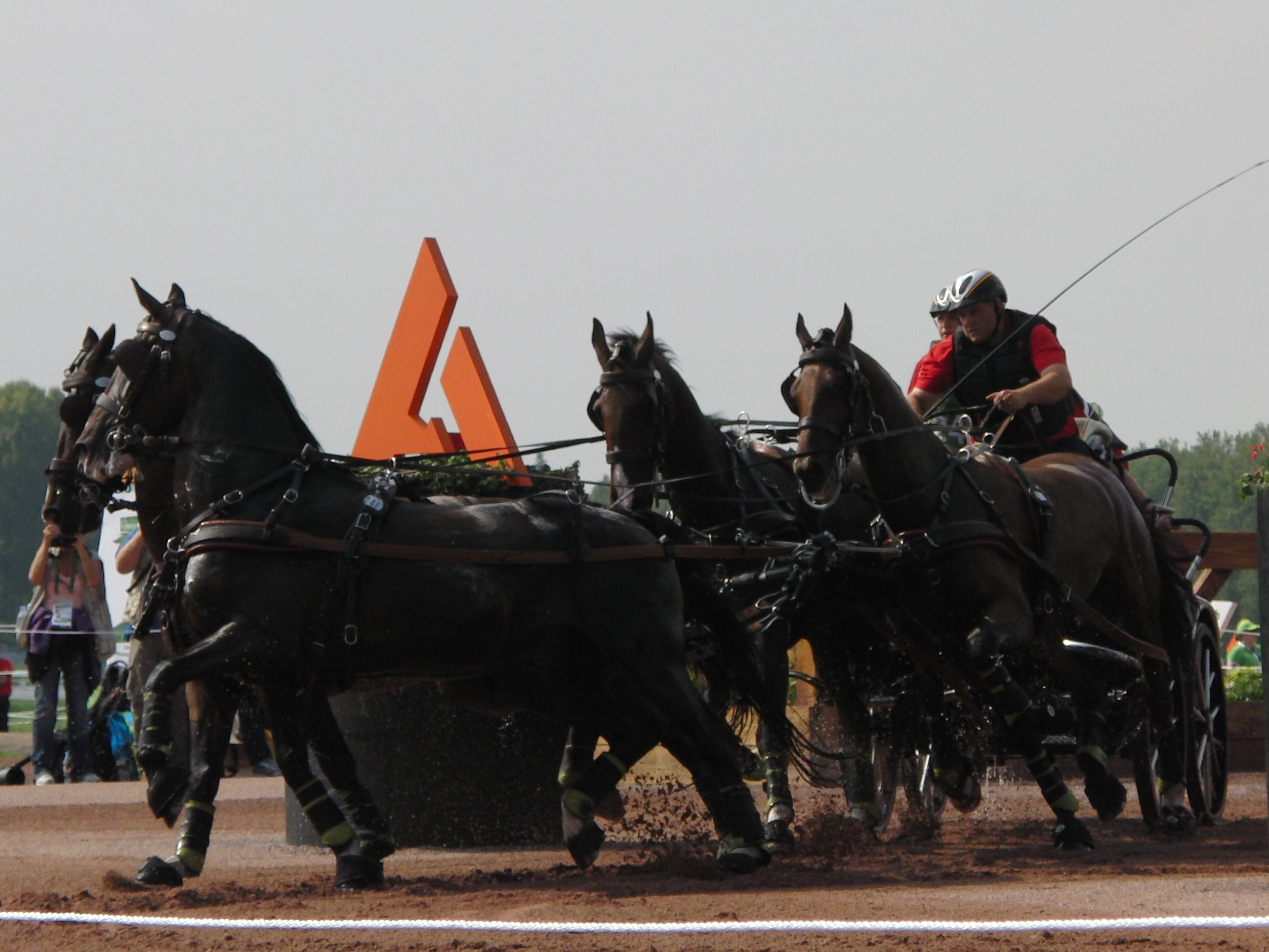
Christoph Sandmann at the World Equestrian Games 2014 in Caen

Christoph Sandmann (born 24 May 1967) is a German equestrian and multiple World Champion at the World Equestrian Games.

Sandmann competes in the driving disciplines and became World Champion for the first time in 1992, when he won the gold medal in the team event in Riesenbeck of the Four-in-Hand World Championships.

He is married to Karin Sandmann. The couple has a daughter Anna Sandmann, born 14 September 1995, who also competes in combined driving with a pair of horses.

== Career highlights ==
World Championships
1992 – Riesenbeck, Driving, (bronze) 3rd at individual competition
1992 – Riesenbeck, Driving, (gold) 1st at team competition
1994 – The Hague, Driving, (gold) 1st at team competition
1996 – Waregem, Driving, (silver) 2nd at team competition
1998 – Rome, Driving, (silver) 2nd at team competition
2002 – Jerez de la Frontera, Driving, (silver) 2nd at individual competition
2002 – Jerez de la Frontera, Driving, (bronze) 3rd at team competition
2006 – Aachen, Driving, (bronze) 3rd at individual competition
2006 – Aachen, Driving, (gold) 1st at team competition
2008 – Beesd (Nederlands), Driving, (silver) 2nd at team competition
2010 - Lexington, Driving, (bronze) 3rd at team competition
2012 - Riesenbeck, Driving, (silver) 2nd at team competition
2014 - Caen, Combined Driving, (silver) 2nd at team competition
2016 Breda (Nederlands), Driving, (bronze) 3rd at team competition

(1994, 1998, 2002, 2006, 2010, 2014 World Championships as part of the FEI World Equestrian Games)

FEI World Cup Driving
2001/02 – Driving, (bronze) 3rd
2002/03 – Driving, (bronze) 3rd
2003/04 – Driving, (bronze) 3rd
2006/07 – Driving, (bronze) 3rd
2007/08 – Driving, (gold) 1st

European Championships
2015 Aachen, Combined Driving, (silver) 2nd at team competition
2001 Breda (Nederlands), Combined Driving, (bronze) 3rd at team competition

National Championships
1990 – Driving, (silver) 2nd
1991 – Driving, (silver) 2nd
1992 – Driving, (silver) 2nd
1993 – Driving, (bronze) 3rd
1994 – Driving, (silver) 2nd
1996 – Driving, (bronze) 3rd
1999 – Driving, (gold) 1st
2000 – Driving, (gold) 1st
2001 – Driving, (silver) 2nd
2002 – Driving, (silver) 2nd
2003 – Driving, (silver) 2nd
2006 – Driving, (bronze) 3rd
2007 – Driving, (gold) 1st
2009 - Riesenbeck, Combined Driving, (gold) 1st
2010 - Lähden, Combined Driving, (gold) 1st
2012 - Lähden, Combined Driving, (gold) 1st
2013 - Donaueschingen, Combined Driving, (gold) 1st
2014 - Riesenbeck, Combined Driving, (silver) 2nd
2016 - Lähden, Combined Driving, (bronze) 3rd

Awards
2002 – FEI Top Driver Award
