= Combined driving =

Sport involving horses pulling carriages

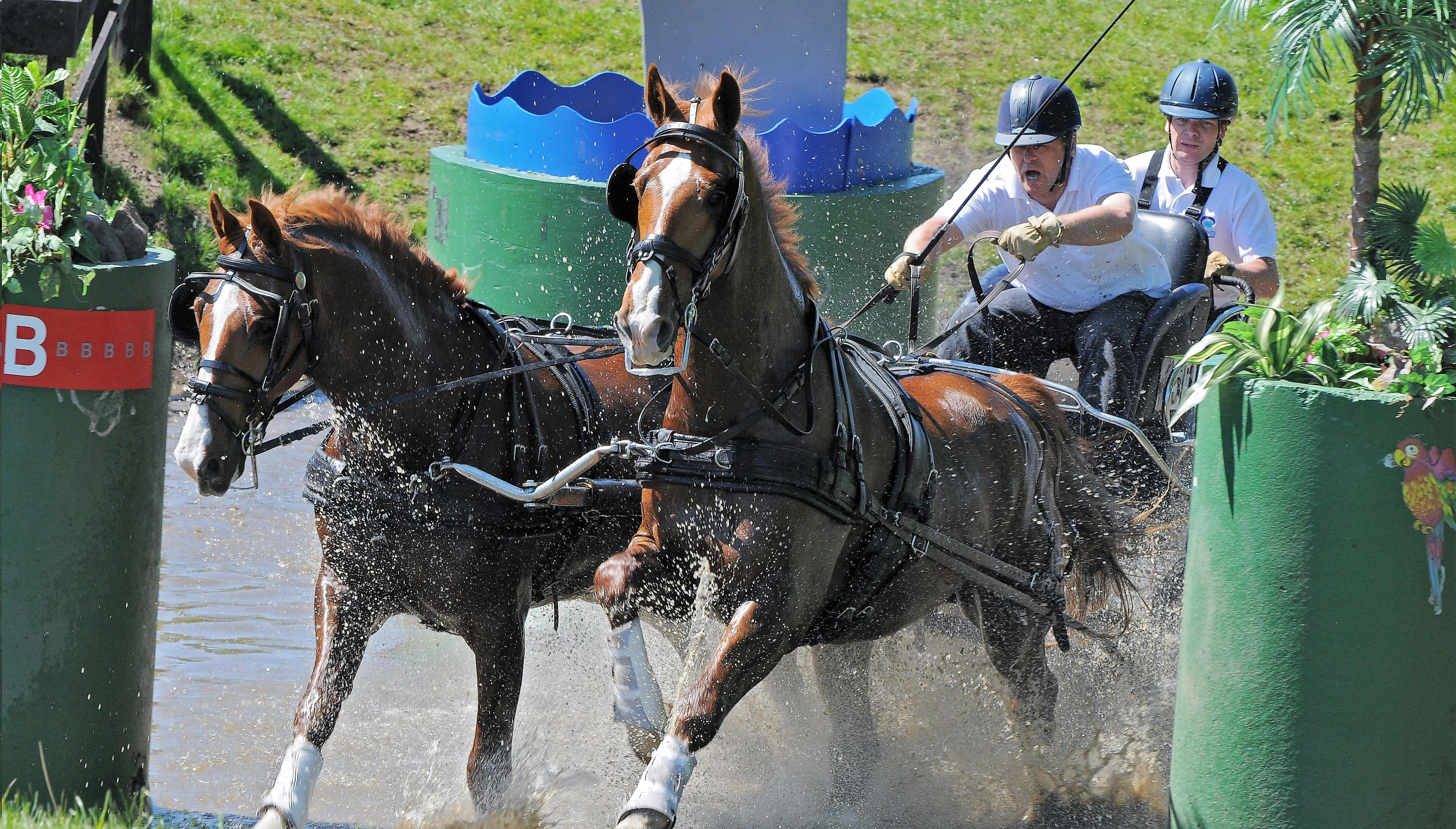
- Horse pair crossing water obstacle
- Highest governing body: International Federation for Equestrian Sports (FEI)

Characteristics
- Team members: Individual competitors at all levels. Additionally, at international levels there are teams of three national competitors .
- Type: Equine sport
- Equipment: Horse, carriage, harness

Presence
- Country or region: Worldwide

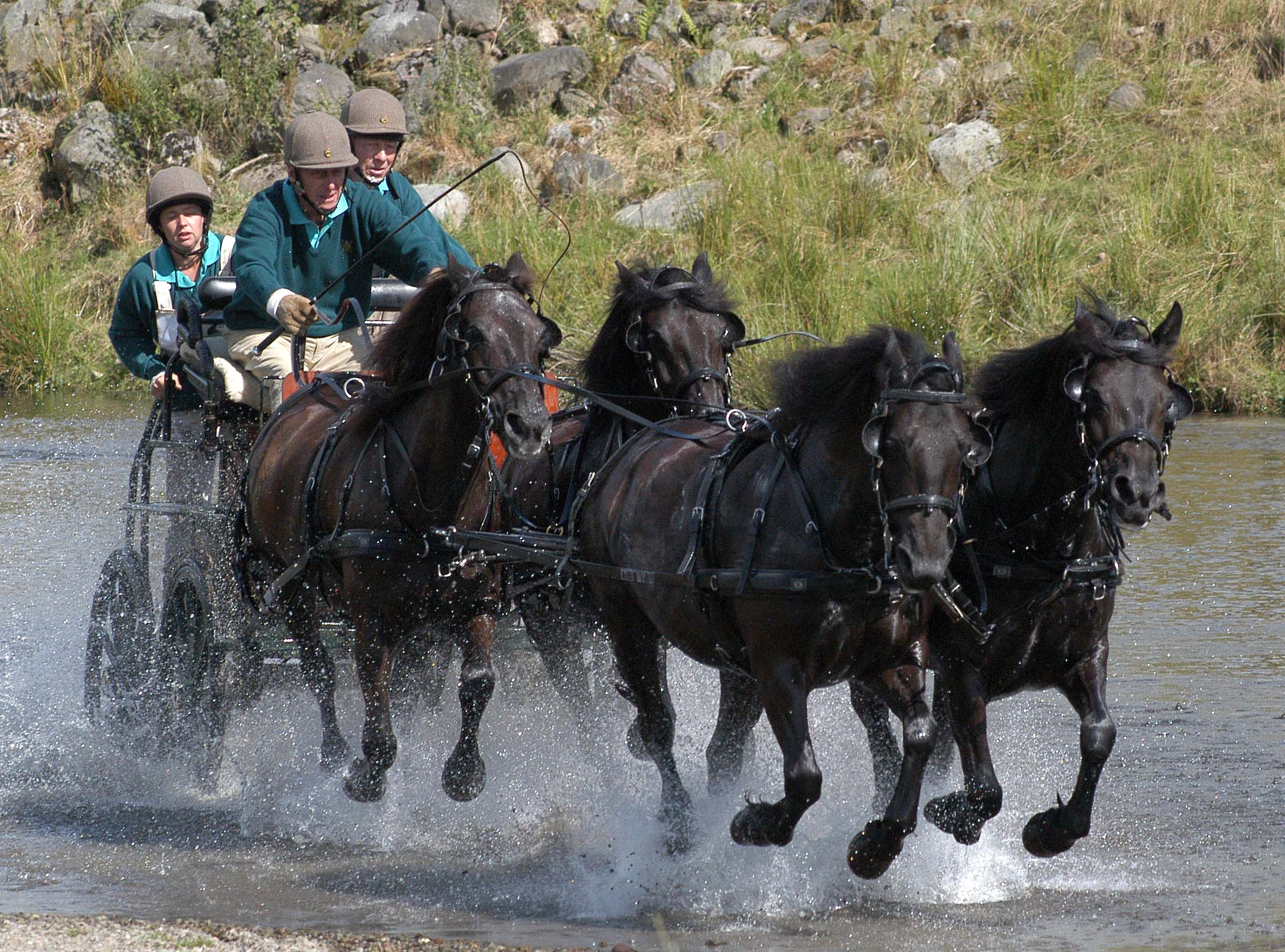
Prince Philip, Duke of Edinburgh competing in 2005

Combined driving (also known as horse driving trials) is an equestrian sport involving carriage driving. In this discipline, the driver sits on a vehicle drawn by a single horse, a pair or a team of four. The sport has three phases: dressage, cross-country marathon and obstacle cone driving — patterned after the mounted equestrian sport of eventing. It is one of the ten international equestrian sport horse disciplines recognized by the Fédération Équestre Internationale (FEI). Combined driving became an FEI discipline in 1970 when Prince Philip, Duke of Edinburgh, the then-president of FEI, produced the first rule book.

== Competitor ==
=== Driver ===
The driver controls the horse or horses through the reins, whip and voice. Although there is a seat next to the driver on some sport carriages — jokingly called the suicide seat — it is not generally occupied in competition if there is a stand or seat behind the driver for attendants. The driver is the official competitor.

=== Navigator and groom ===
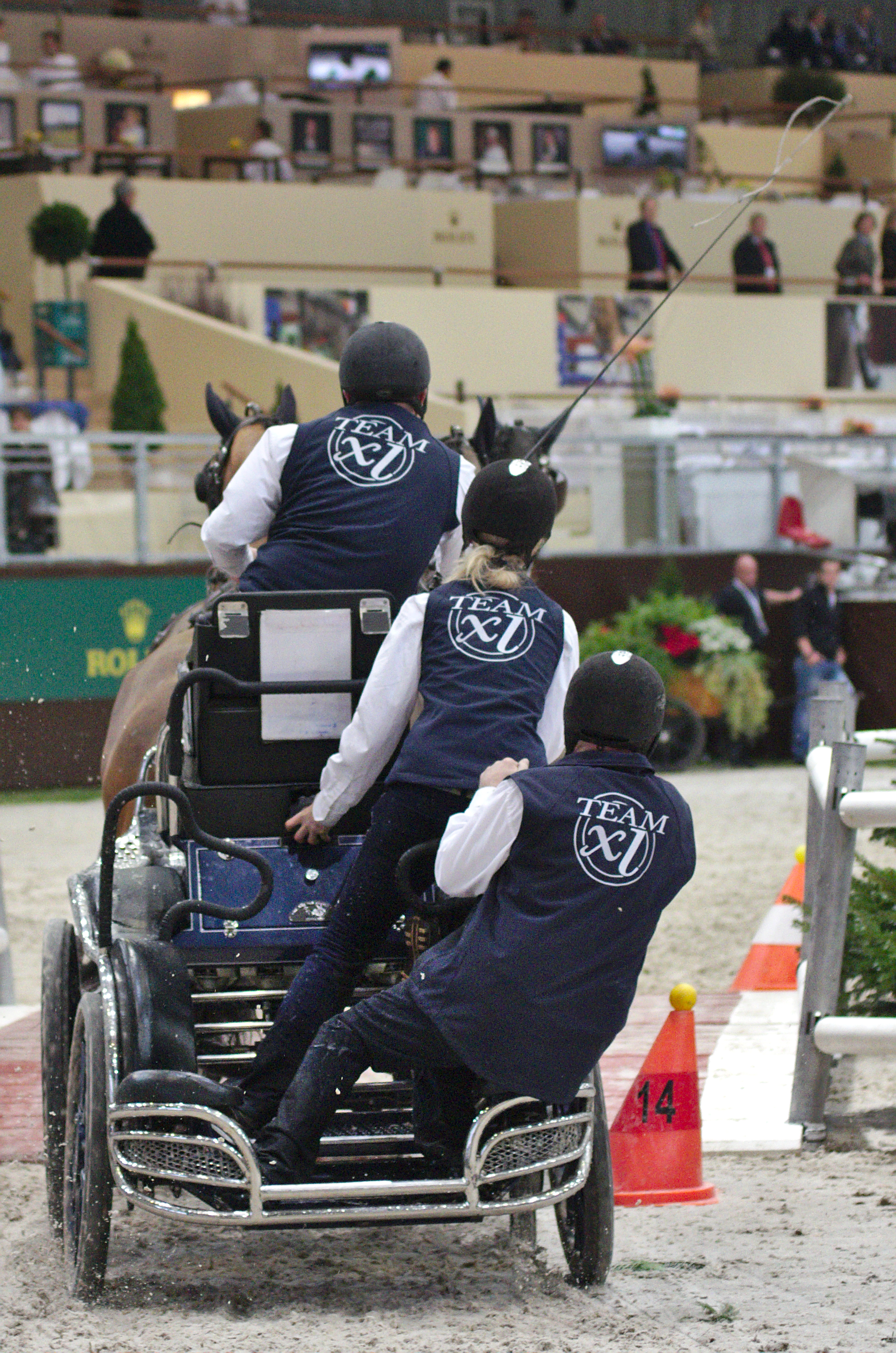
World champion four-in-hand driver Boyd Exell and his grooms

When driving a four-in-hand, a driver and two attendants (called grooms) are required on the carriage. Driving a pair requires one groom, and for driving a single horse a groom is optional. A groom may also have the job of navigator, who stands behind the driver and can give verbal directions to the driver. The navigator may also help keep time with a stopwatch and tell the driver if he is going too slow or too fast in timed events. If there is a second groom, they will stand behind the navigator and help with ballast and balance during fast maneuvers. Steps on the carriage behind the driver are called the backstep and the grooms are also called backsteppers.

Grooms are required for safety reasons because the driver must stay on the carriage at all times, holding the reins and controlling the horses. A groom will hitch the horse to the carriage and will adjust harness or correct problems if needed. However, if a groom falls off or exits the carriage during competition there will be penalty points assessed. If there is a collision with an object or a horse falls, the grooms are needed to hold horses and help untangle harness.

=== Horse ===
Driving horses or ponies may be of any breed, although warmbloods are often seen at the highest levels of competition. If multiple horses are used together, they should be of similar height, build, and movement, and preferably similar color. Horses closest to the driver are called wheelers, and those in the front are called leaders.

=== Carriage and harness ===
Competitors may use either 2-wheeled or 4-wheeled vehicles, but 4-wheelers are most often used in modern competition, with two-wheelers used mainly at the beginning levels or with smaller ponies. Some competitors use two carriages at competition: a sturdy sport carriage for the marathon phase, and a more traditional looking carriage for dressage and obstacle phases. Most marathon carriages are of a modern design, built from steel or aluminum, with hydraulic disc brakes, a low centre of gravity, and a very small turning radius. The harness used with a marathon carriage is often made from synthetic materials, whereas an attractive presentation harness is usually made of leather and is used for the dressage and obstacles portions of the competition.

"Three-phase" carriages are popular, especially at entry levels, as drivers need only one vehicle. These carriages have extending axles to make the rear wheels the required width for the dressage and obstacles phases (currently 138 cm minimum for all pony, single horse, and tandem horse classes). All carriages for the marathon phase are 125 cm minimum track width, measured on the ground and on the rear wheels. For Indoor driving trials, carriages should be a minimum width of 125 cm for all phases.

== Phases of competition ==
=== Phase A1: Presentation ===
The judge grades on the turnout, safety, cleanliness, general condition and impression of the horses, harness, and vehicle, the matching of the horses or ponies, and the attire of the driver and grooms. For newcomer or novice classes, presentation is inspected and marked by a judge at a stand-still before dressage. For more advanced classes, presentation is judged on-the-move as part of the driven dressage test. Pre-novice and novice drivers are judged primarily on safety and fit of the harness and vehicle and a three-phase or marathon vehicle and harness is acceptable. Presentation carries a maximum of ten penalties.

- Driver, grooms and passengers should be clean and smartly dressed. The livery of the grooms should fit and match if there is more than one groom. The whip should be the correct length based on the number of horses used. Drivers and grooms should wear brown gloves, as well as a driving hat, and the driver wears an apron.
- Horses should be clean and well-conditioned. If there are several horses, they should be of similar size and type (build), although the wheelers may be larger than the leaders. Matching color is secondary to matching type and size. Manes may or may not be braided, but should be level. Tails should not be braided.
- Harness should be sound, clean, and fit correctly. Harness, if more than one horse is used, should match, although different bits may be used. The overall harness should also match. Martingales other than false martingales are not permitted. Harness straps should not be buckled on the last hole so that adjustment may be made should a piece of harness break.
- Carriages should be the correct size and weight for the horse, as should the height and length of the poles for pairs and fours. Lamps are required at the advanced level, but only required at the training, preliminary, and intermediate levels and only if the carriage has lamp brackets. A set of spare tools and harness pieces should be carried on the vehicle in case of emergency: a spare trace of the correct size, a rein splice, a hole punch, and similar items are traditionally included. These may be inspected by the judge and the groom will be expected to know how to use them.
- Overall impression is judged on dress and position of driver and grooms, and suitability of horses and harness to the carriage.

=== Phase A2: Dressage ===
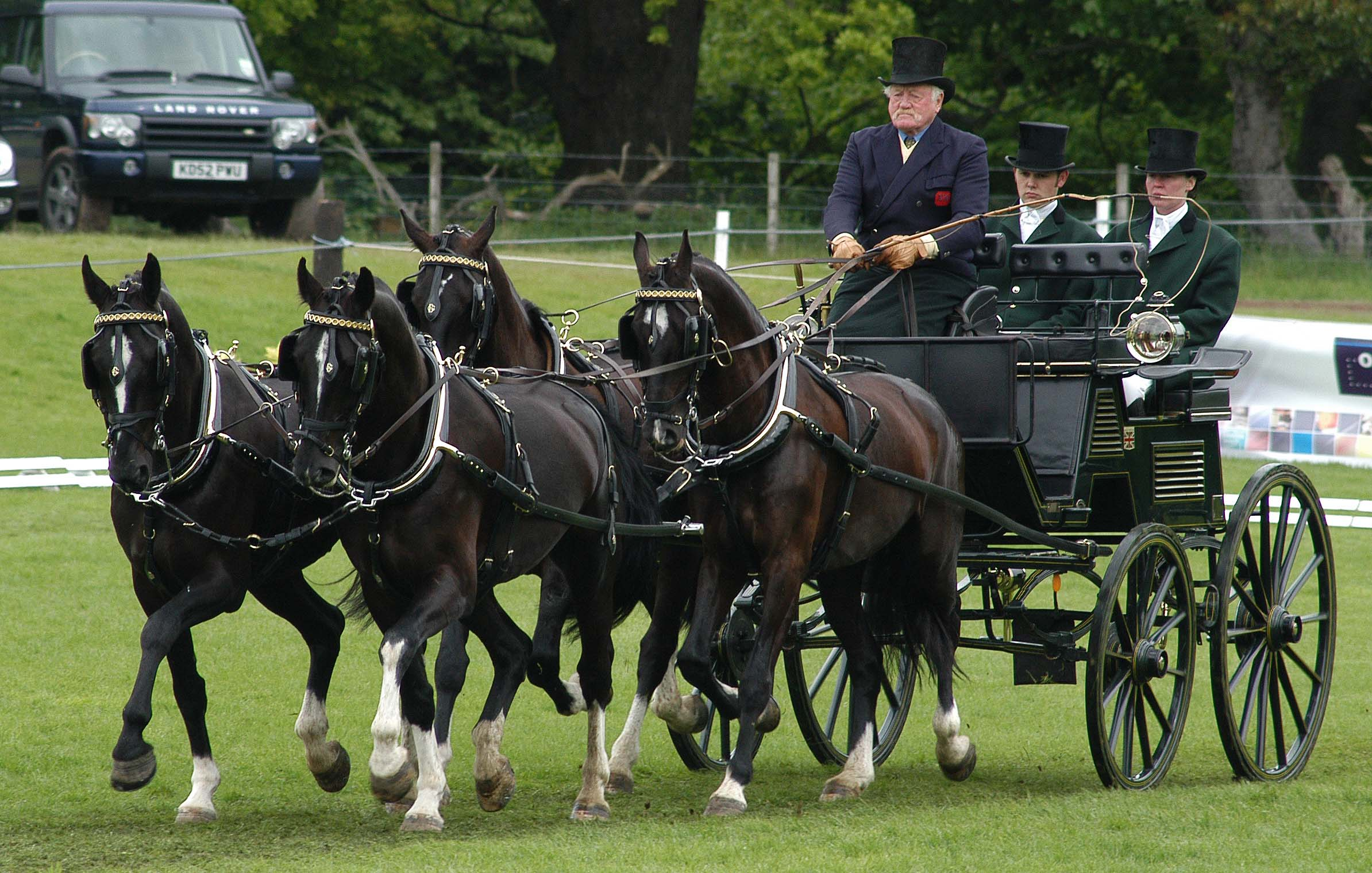
The dressage phase

The dressage test is somewhat similar to dressage under saddle. The test is performed in a 40 by 80 or 40 by 100 metre arena with letter markers, where transitions in speed and gait are to take place. The judge scores each movement on a scale of 0–10, with a 10 being the highest mark possible. The difficulty of the test increases with each subsequent level of competition. At the lower levels, only one judge will normally be positioned at C (the centre of the short side of the arena) and the Test may have 16 movements. At higher levels, three judges may be used and at International competitions and World Championships there may be up to five judges, with the Championship Test having 25 movements. The judges' marks are averaged to generate the score.

Dressage movements may include circles, figures of eight, and crossing the diagonal and all paces – walk, working trot, collected trot, extended trot, canter, a halt, and a rein back. Multiple horses are judged on ability to move in harmony and ideally will have similar conformation, action, and movement. Horses are to remain on the bit throughout the test, maintaining impulsion, elasticity, rhythm, and forward movement. The goal is to make the test look effortless, and an obedient and responsive horse is essential for a good dressage test.

Unlike a ridden dressage test, a driven test allows the use of the voice as an aid. At international level, dressage tests are prepared by the Fédération Equestre Internationale (F.E.I.) which is the governing body of competitive carriage driving.

=== Phase B: Marathon ===
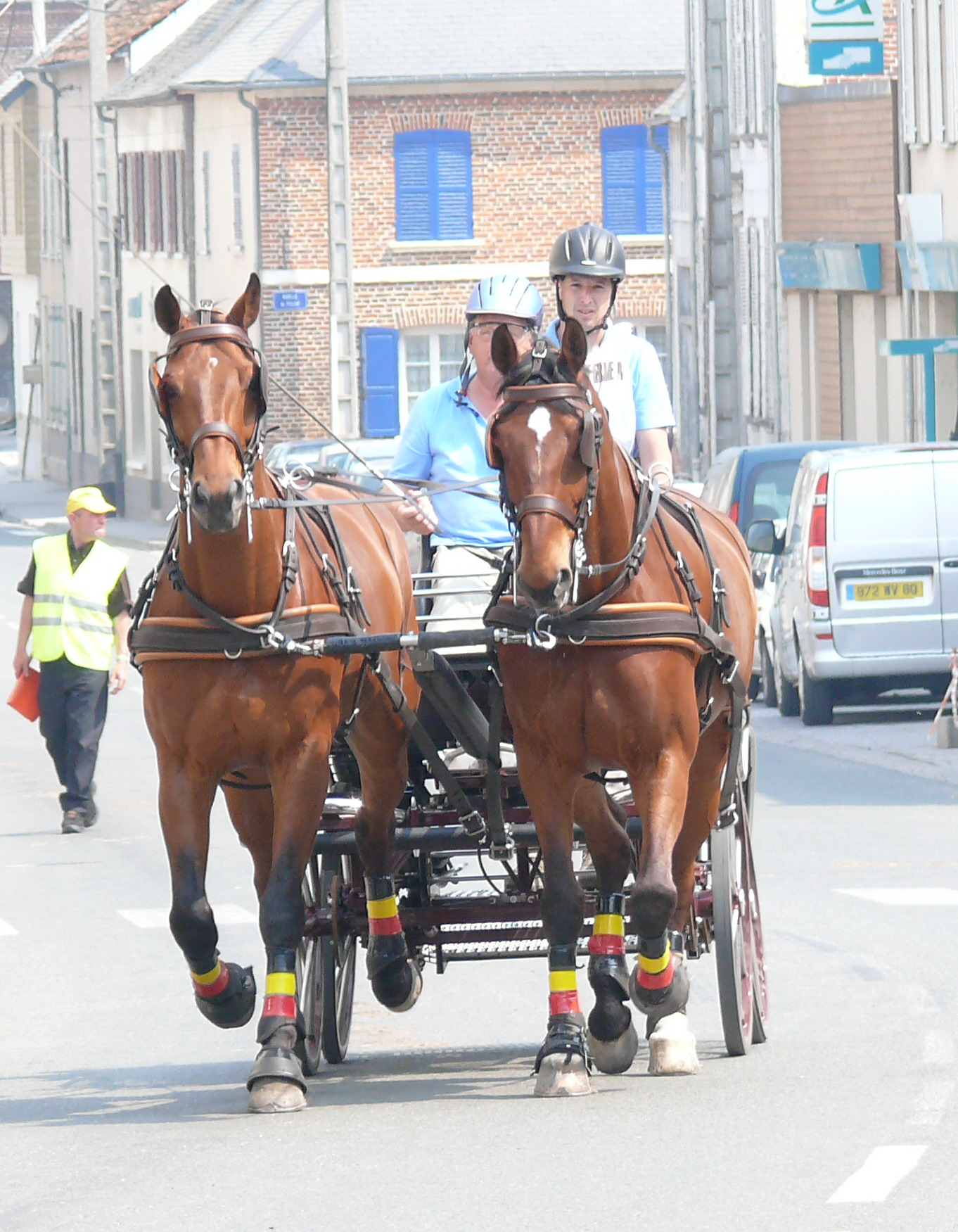
Marathon phase

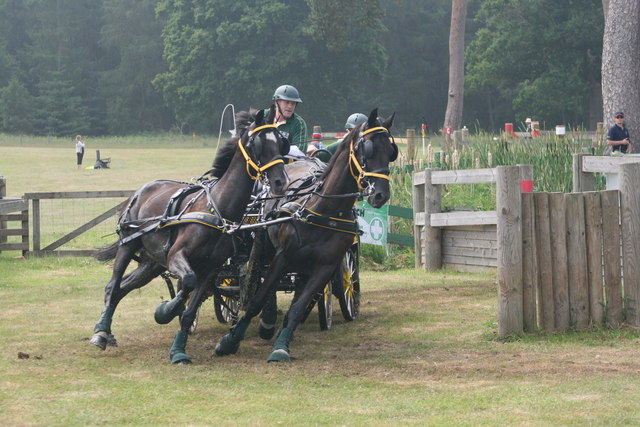
Marathon phase, Sandringham, England

The marathon is similar to the second phase of eventing, the speed and endurance. It tests the fitness and stamina of the horses, as well as the driver's knowledge of pace, over a 10–22 km course, divided into 3 or 5 sections. The marathon is the most thrilling phase to watch, and often draws the largest crowds.

Section "E" of the marathon is similar to the cross-country phase of eventing. It has obstacles or "hazards" throughout the course to test the speed and agility of the horses, and the driving ability of the whip. Obstacles may include water, tight twists through trees or man-made obstacles, steep hills, or fences and pens. Drivers are scored on how quickly they can negotiate the obstacle, and must find the fastest route through each. Penalty points are given if too much time is spent in an obstacle, or if the team comes in off the optimum time for the whole course.

==== Marathon sections ====
The marathon phase has three sections in international competition. Sections A and B may be driven at any pace, but normally will be at a trot. The transfer section is designed to get the competitors from the end of A to the start of B and enough time is given to complete this section at a walking pace. There is a compulsory rest halt at the end of the Transfer section, which may include a veterinary check. The marathon is not a race for speed. Each section has a maximum and a minimum time allowed, giving a two to three minute "window". If a competitor finishes outside this window (depending on which section is being driven), penalty points will be awarded. A competitor may also receive penalty points for not driving a section at the required pace.

Throughout the marathon and in the obstacles the groom can speak to the driver and assist using their weight and balance to keep the carriage upright or to bounce it off the obstacle uprights. The groom also helps to keep the correct pace by checking the kilometer markers on the course against calculated timings for each section, allowing for ground conditions and the horse's fitness.

The three sections and their maximum lengths and speeds, as specified in the FEI rulebook, are:

Section	Max. distance	Pace	Speed
A	8000 m	Any pace	15 km/h
Transfer	800 – 1000 m	Any pace	7 km/h
B	9000 m	Any pace	14 km/h

Section B includes up to eight obstacles, to be driven in sequence. The last designated 300 to 500 m must be driven at walk or trot, with no stopping for any reason.

A time window – a minimum and a maximum time – is calculated for each section according to the length of the section, the average speed of the carriage and whether it is pulled by horses or ponies. After the walk section there is a ten-minute halt, where the horses can be cooled and watered. A veterinary check may follow the Transfer section to ensure that the horses are fit to continue.

At club events, the rules may often be relaxed somewhat with, for instance, a "short marathon" which usually means only section B and (some of) the obstacles are driven. This is usually a class designed to encourage drivers of small ponies and young ponies and horses or for inexperienced and junior drivers. It enables newcomers to gain experience and confidence.

==== Marathon obstacles ====
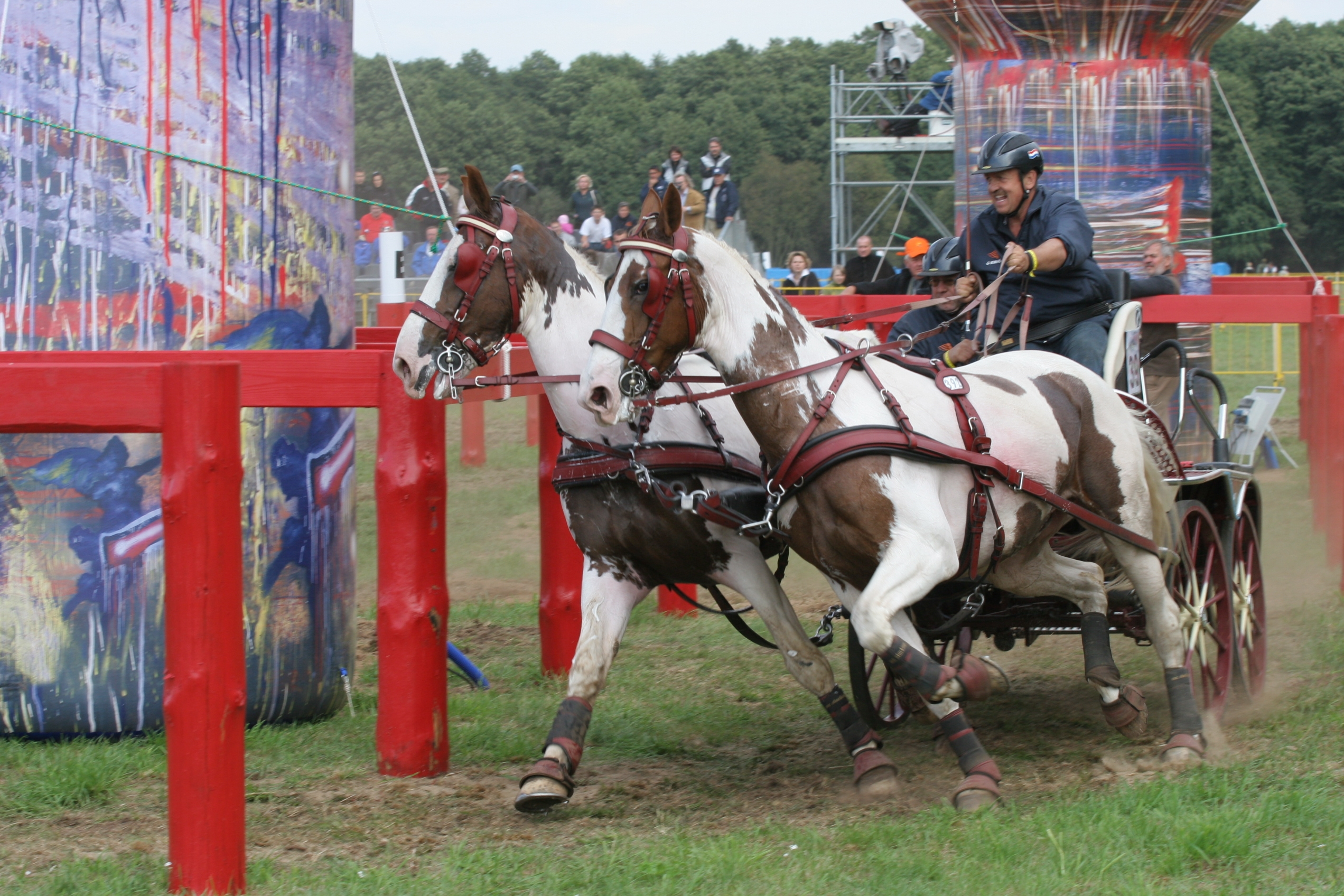
Negotiating an obstacle at speed

Marathon obstacles, sometimes known as hazards, frequently take advantage of natural features, being sited around trees and on slopes, but are typically solidly-built sections of posts and rails. National events have decorated and/or brightly painted obstacles which are more exciting to the eye, however many clubs have venues where the obstacles are permanent and these are more likely to be imaginatively dressed than sites where the obstacles are built specially for each event.

Driving any horse or pony and carriage around an obstacle at speed requires practice and a rapport between driver, animal(s) and groom(s). Timing starts as the horse's nose crosses the start line and ends when his nose crosses the finish line, frequently the same markers.

=== Phase C: Obstacle cone driving ===
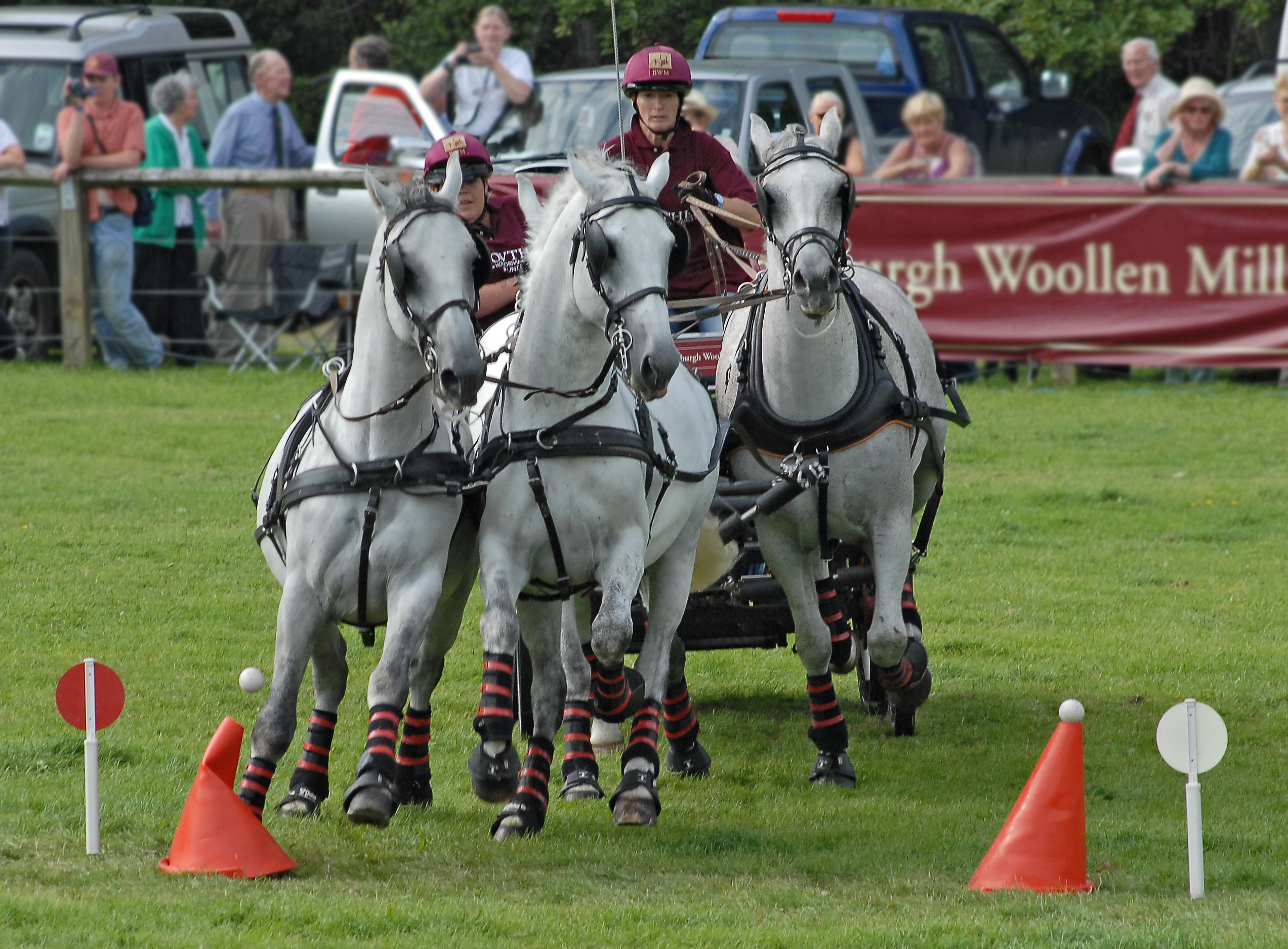
A ball is dislodged from the top of a cone.

The obstacle cone driving phase is a test of accuracy, speed and obedience, equivalent to the show jumping phase of eventing. Competitors walk the cones course before they drive it. The driver negotiates a course of up to 20 pairs of cones, each cone having a ball balanced on top. The cones are only a few centimeters wider than the wheels of the carriage, depending on the level of the class and the type of turnout (from 50 cm at the lower levels, to only 22 cm at the advanced singles level). Knocking over one or both of a pair of cones adds three penalties to the driver's score. The course may also include obstacles made of raised rails in a U or right angle, and a wooden bridge. The cones section is timed and going over the time set for the driver's class leads to penalties. Circling before an obstacle and refusals are also assessed penalty points.

== Scoring ==
Scores and times are converted into "penalty points", and scores from all three phases are combined to give a final result. The competitor with the lowest penalty score is the winner.

In the dressage phase, each movement is marked by the judges from 0 to 10 points. There may be 25 movements in the test. The marks are added together and, if there is more than one judge, they are divided by the number of judges to get an average. The total is then subtracted from the maximum possible mark to give a penalty score for the dressage. For example, if there are 16 movements, the total marks will be subtracted from 160 to get a penalty score.

In the marathon, time penalties are assessed at the end of each section for the amount of time a competitor finishes either under or over the permitted time window for that section. If the driver finishes within the allowed time window, he does not receive any penalties. In addition, in each obstacle, penalties are assessed for the length of time the driver spends negotiating the obstacle (the time from crossing the start line to crossing the finish line). These penalties are added to any section time penalties. Further penalties may be given for infringements such as dislodging a part of the obstacle (a knock down element), the groom dismounting the carriage or even for the carriage overturning.

In the obstacle cone driving, time penalties are assessed for exceeding the time allowed to complete the cones course, which is calculated by taking the measured distance of the course and dividing it by the speed allowed. Penalty points also accrue for knocking down a ball from any of the cones on the course.

In all phases of the competition, a number of other infringements may also incur penalties, for example the driver or groom dismounting the vehicle, breaking of pace where a certain pace is prescribed, not carrying a whip in the dressage or cones, errors of course in the dressage, marathon obstacles or cones. Some infringements, such as an uncorrected error of course will cause the competitor to be eliminated.

All the possible penalties are described in the rule books, published by the FEI and National Federations. Calculation of results can be complex and there are software programs available to record the data and calculate results.

== The levels and divisions of combined driving ==
International driving competitions, which fall under FEI rules, are divided into the following categories:

- Single horse – only one animal is used to pull the carriage
- Pair of horses – two animals are harnessed to the carriage, side by side
- Four-in-Hand (sometimes known as a "team") – four horses, one pair being in front of the other pair

Competitions are further divided into horses and ponies. Driving ponies must not exceed 148 cm in height; all others are classified as horses.

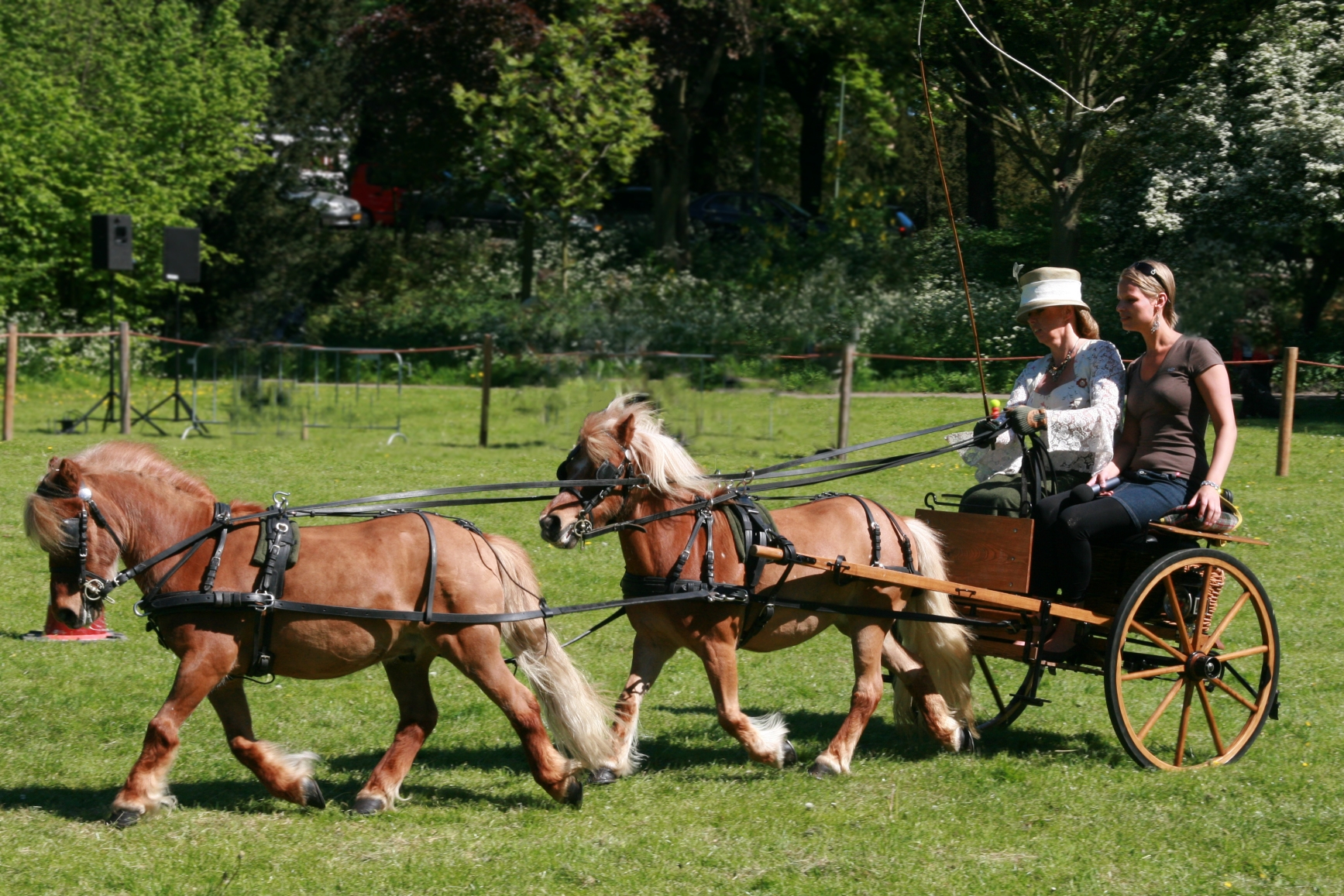
Two ponies harnessed in tandem

Some competitions (usually not international) may use other arrangements, for example:

- Tandem – one horse or pony in front of the other
- Randem – three horses in-line, one in the front, one in the middle and one at the rear
- Unicorn – two horses at the back, one at the front
- Pickaxe – one horse at the back, two at the front
- Troika – three horses side by side

At National and Club level, further division is made according to the ability and experience of the driver. In the United States, the levels of combined driving are: Training, Preliminary, Intermediate, and Advanced. In the UK, where the sport is known as Horse Driving Trials, the levels of progression from Club to National competition are: Pre-novice, Novice, Intermediate, Open, and Advanced. In New Zealand the sport is known as Combined Driving Trials (CDT), and the levels of competition are: Novice, Intermediate, and Open.

The driver qualifies for the class usually by successfully competing in a lower class for a set period of time or a number of wins. Most people start driving with a single pony or horse. Many clubs run special classes for the smallest ponies.

A 'training division' is for a novice horse; the driver may be of any level, including a seasoned driver.

Classes are frequently split by height divisions, such as tiny pony, small pony, large pony and horse. Multiples (pairs, tandems, teams, etc.) are driven in their height class.

== Indoor driving ==
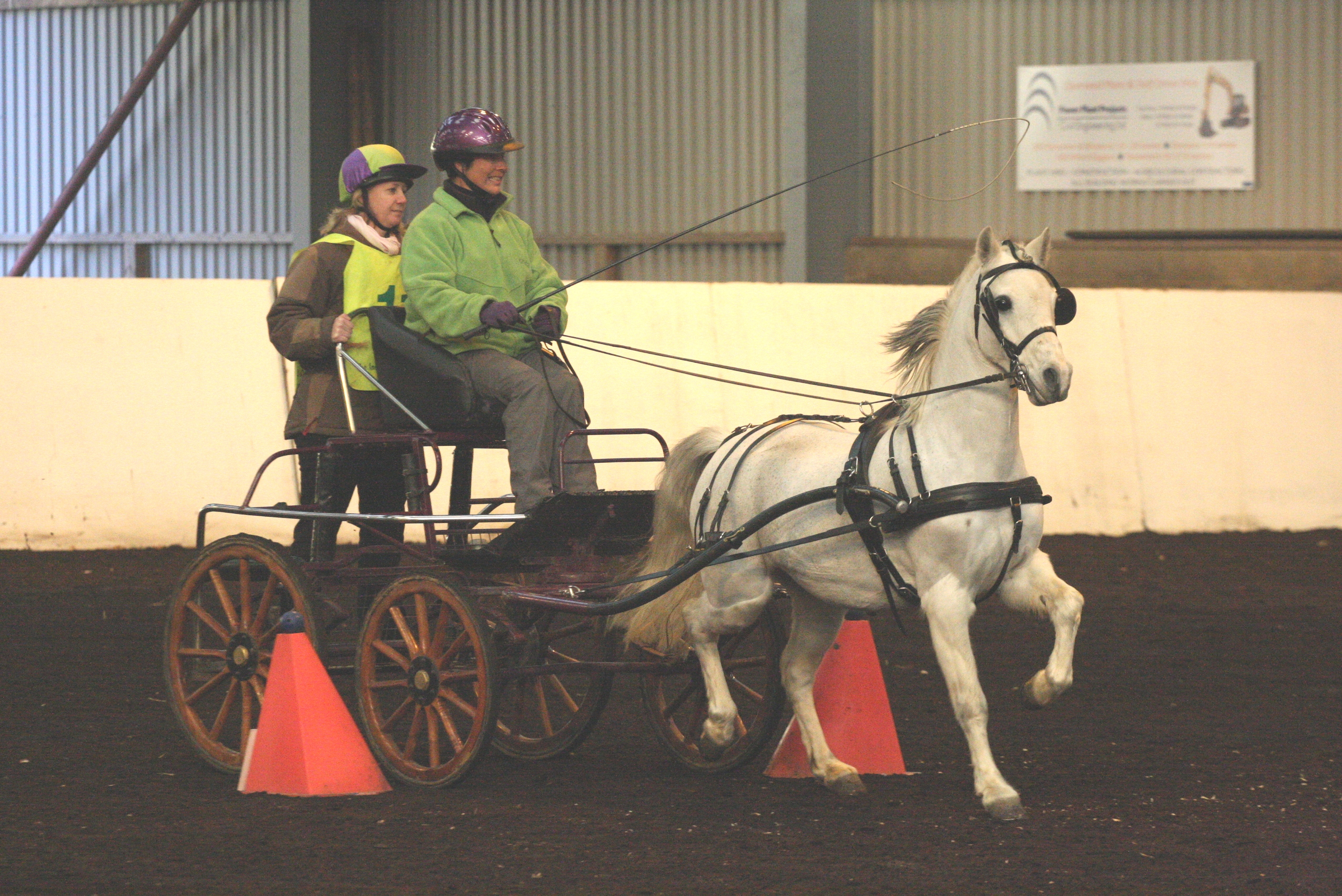
Indoor driving rules in the UK allow the groom to stand on the backstep for all phases

In 1998 a group of enthusiasts in Sussex, England, started a series of winter one-day competitions, based on the three phases of driving trials, but modified to take place in an indoor arena. They called it Indoor Driving Trials.

Starting with the dressage in a marked dressage arena of only 20 by 50 metres, the drivers perform a dressage test called Precision and Paces (P&P). This takes five minutes to drive and is marked by two judges, one judging only the paces and one judging the precision and accuracy of the figures. Each judge has a scorer close by who holds up the judge's mark for each of the ten movements in the test so the event scorer (and audience) can see it.

After P&P, the arena is cleared and a cones course of ten pairs of cones is set out. Everyone walks the course and an optimum time is set, based on the length of the course and a speed of 220m/minute. Completing the course too fast or too slow means the competitor is assessed penalty points for each second over or under the optimum time. Knocking a ball down off a cone adds a further five penalties.

After the cones phase, two obstacles are built in the arena and the drivers and grooms walk them, choosing the best route for their turnout. The drivers come back into the arena one-at-a-time in their class, in reverse order of their score placing – best goes last – and drive the two obstacles as fast as possible. Then they drive them a second time. The drivers with the lowest score in their class are the winners.

In early 2013 Indoor Horse Driving Trials UK renamed itself Indoor Carriage Driving UK in line with the re-branding of the British Horse Driving Trials to British Carriagedriving.

== FEI World Cup ==
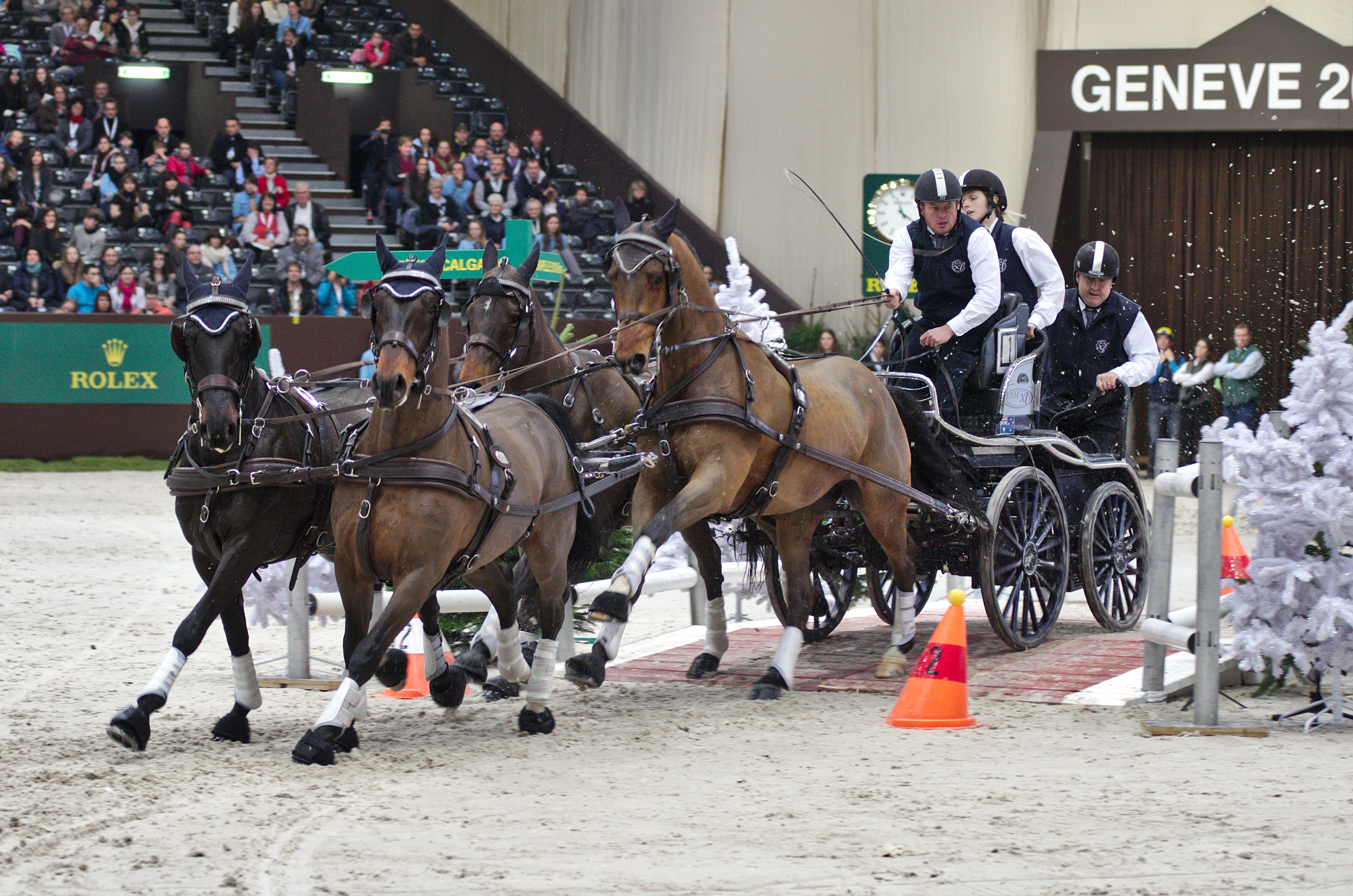
Boyd Exell competing at the 2013 CHI Genève World Cup Driving competition

In 2001 the FEI introduced a new World Cup series, alongside World Cup Jumping and World Cup Dressage. Called The FEI World Cup Driving, it is a series of competitions for four-in-hand drivers, that provides an innovative and exciting style of competition in an indoor arena. These take place at venues throughout Europe, alongside other World Cup competitions, during the months of October to March.

Drivers qualify to take part in the World Cup at a number of designated qualifying outdoor events during the preceding summer season. The top ten drivers in the qualifying table go forward to compete in the World Cup. There are 6 or 7 events in the World Cup series, plus a Final. Of the 10 qualified drivers, 5 compete in each event. In addition, the home nation which is staging the event may nominate up to 3 "wildcard" drivers to take part. Two rounds are driven in each World Cup competition, usually on subsequent days. The warm-up round is first and the placing of drivers after this round determines the starting order for the World Cup competition proper.

The World Cup Driving course combines elements from marathon obstacles and cones driving phases of outdoor driving competitions. Two obstacles are built, one at each end of the arena, with a number of cones between them. These all have to be driven in the correct sequence and at the fastest possible speed, without dislodging any of the knock-down elements. The course will also include a "bridge".

Drivers are awarded points according to their placings in each round. After the 6 or 7 World Cup competitions, the five highest placed drivers go forward to the Final. At the Final, all drivers start from scratch. The top 3 drivers after the first round will then have a drive off over the same course, with their scores carried forward into the drive off.

In 2023, Australian driver Boyd Exell won his 10th World Cup Driving Final. At his prior win, the final qualifier in Leipzig, Germany the announcer declared him "number one in the world, more titles than any other driver in history."

World Cup Driving Final winners
Year	1st	2nd	3rd
2025–2026	Dries Degrieck (BEL)	Bram Chardon (NED)	Boyd Exell (AUS)
2024–2025	Boyd Exell (AUS)	Degrieck Dries (BEL)	Koos de Ronde (NED)
2023–2024	Bram Chardon (NED)	Boyd Exell (AUS)	IJsbrand Chardon (NED)
2022–2023	Boyd Exell (AUS)	Bram Chardon (NED)	IJsbrand Chardon (NED)
2021-2022	Bram Chardon (NED)	Boyd Exell (AUS)	Glenn Geerts (BEL)
2020–2021	Cancelled †		
2019-2020	Boyd Exell (AUS)	Koos de Ronde (NED)	IJsbrand Chardon (NED)
2018-2019	Bram Chardon (NED)	Koos de Ronde (NED)	Glenn Geerts (BEL)
2017-2018	Boyd Exell (AUS)	Jérôme Voutz (SUI)	Koos de Ronde (NED)
2016-2017	Boyd Exell (AUS)	Jérôme Voutaz (SUI)	Koos de Ronde (NED)
2015-2016	IJsbrand Chardon (NED)	Boyd Exell (AUS)	Koos de Ronde (NED)
2014-2015	Boyd Exell (AUS)	Christoph Sandmann (GER)	IJsbrand Chardon (NED)
2013-2014	Boyd Exell (AUS)	Daniel Schneiders (GER)	Koos de Ronde (NED)
2012-2013	Koos de Ronde (NED)	Boyd Exell (AUS)	IJsbrand Chardon (NED)
2011-2012	Boyd Exell (AUS)	IJsbrand Chardon (NED)	Koos de Ronde (NED)
2010-2011	Boyd Exell (AUS)	József Dobrovitz (HUN)	IJsbrand Chardon (NED)
2009–2010	Boyd Exell (AUS)	Koos de Ronde (NED)	IJsbrand Chardon (NED)
2008–2009	Boyd Exell (AUS)	IJsbrand Chardon (NED)	Koos de Ronde (NED)
2007–2008	Christoph Sandmann (GER)	Benjamin Aillaud (FRA)	IJsbrand Chardon (NED)
2006–2007	Michael Freund (GER)	IJsbrand Chardon (NED)	Christoph Sandmann (GER)
2005–2006	IJsbrand Chardon (NED)	Michael Freund (GER)	Werner Ulrich (SUI)
2004–2005	IJsbrand Chardon (NED)	Michael Freund (GER)	Werner Ulrich (SUI)
2003–2004	Michael Freund (GER)	Boyd Exell (AUS)	Christoph Sandmann (GER)
2002–2003	Michael Freund (GER)	Boyd Exell (AUS)	Christoph Sandmann (GER)
2001–2002	Michael Freund (GER)	Chester Weber (USA)	Christoph Sandmann (GER)

† The 2020-2021 season was interrupted due to the COVID-19 pandemic.

== World Championships ==
The World Championships are international competitions where national teams compete against each other. Individual competitors compete against each other at the same time. In 1972, the first World Driving Championships were only for four-in-hand teams. In 1985, a pairs championship was added, and in 1998 a singles championship. Pony divisions were added in 2003.

=== Four-in-Hand World Championships ===
Since 1972, the World Driving Championships for four-in-hand driving have taken place every two years. Prizes are awarded for national teams and individuals. Winners have included:

- 2026: Netherlands (team), Boyd Exell (individual)
- 2024: Netherlands (team), Boyd Exell (individual)
- 2022: Netherlands (team), Boyd Exell (individual)
- 2020: canceled due to COVID-19 pandemic
- 2018: United States (team), Boyd Exell (individual)
- 2016: Netherlands (team), Boyd Exell (individual)
- 2014: Netherlands (team), Boyd Exell (individual)
- 2012: Netherlands (team), Boyd Exell (individual)
- 2010: Netherlands (team), Boyd Exell (individual)
- 2008: Netherlands (team), IJsbrand Chardon (individual)
- 2006: Germany (team), Felix Marie Brasseur (individual)
- 2004: Hungary (team), Zoltán Lázár (individual)
- 2002: Netherlands (team), IJsbrand Chardon (individual)
- 2000: Sweden (team), Tomas Eriksson (individual)
- 1998: Netherlands (team), Werner Ulrich (individual)
- 1996: Belgium (team), Felix Marie Brasseur (individual)
- 1994: Germany (team), Michael Freund (individual)
- 1992: Germany (team), IJsbrand Chardon (individual)
- 1990: Sweden (team), Tomas Eriksson (individual)
- 1988: Netherlands (team), IJsbrand Chardon (individual)
- 1986: Netherlands (team), Tjeerd Velstra (individual)
- 1984: Hungary (team), Laszlo Juhasz (individual)
- 1982: Netherlands (team), Tjeerd Velstra (individual)
- 1980: United Kingdom (team), Gyorgy Bardos (individual)
- 1978: Hungary (team), Gyorgy Bardos (individual)
- 1976: Hungary (team), Imre Abonyi (individual)
- 1974: United Kingdom (team), Sandor Fulop (individual)
- 1972: United Kingdom (team), Auguste Dubey (individual)

=== Pairs World Championships ===
Since 1985, the World Driving Championships for pairs have taken place every two years. Prizes are awarded for national teams and individuals. Winners have included:

- 2023: Hungary (team), Martin Hölle (individual)
- 2021: Hungary (team), Martin Hölle (individual)
- 2019: Hungary (team), Martin Hölle (individual)
- 2017: Hungary (team), Martin Hölle (individual)
- 2015: Hungary (team), Lázár Vilmos (individual)
- 2013: Hungary (team), Lázár Vilmos (individual)
- 2011: Netherlands (team), Carola Diener (individual)
- 2009: Netherlands (team), Harrie Verstappen (individual)
- 2007: Germany (team), Lázár Vilmos (individual)
- 2005: Austria (team), Rainer Pointl (individual)
- 2003: Hungary (team), Riny Rutjens (individual)
- 2001: Hungary (team), Lázár Vilmos (individual)
- 1999: Hungary (team), Lázár Vilmos (individual)
- 1997: United Kingdom (team), Zoltán Lázár (individual)
- 1995: France (team), Mieke van Tergouw (individual)
- 1993: Austria (team), Georg Moser (individual)
- 1991: United States (team), Werner Ulrich (individual)
- 1989: Hungary (team), Udo Hochgeschurz (individual)
- 1987: Germany (team), Laszlo Kecskemeti (individual)
- 1985: Switzerland (team), Ekkert Meineche (individual)

=== Singles World Championships ===
Since 1998, the World Singles Championships have taken place every second year. Prizes are awarded for national teams and individuals. Winners have included:

- 2022: France (team), Saskia Siebers (individual)
- 2020: Netherlands (team), Saskia Siebers
- 2018: Netherlands (team), Bartlomiej Kwiatek
- 2016: Germany (team), Dieter Lauterbach (individual)
- 2014: Germany (team), Wilbron Van Den Broek (individual)
- 2012: Germany (team), Christoph Dieker (individual)
- 2010: Germany (team), Thorsten Zarembowicz (individual)
- 2008: France (team), Jan van den Broek (individual)
- 2006: United Kingdom (team), Paul Sidwell (individual)
- 2004: Sweden (team), Marie Kahrle (individual)
- 2002: Sweden (team), Stéphane Chouzenoux (individual)
- 2000: cancelled due to West Nile virus outbreak
- 1998: Sweden (team), Arja Mikkonen (individual)

=== Pony World Driving Championships ===
Since 2003, the Pony World Driving Championships have taken place every two years. There are individual competitions for singles, pairs and four-in-hand. The teams from the various categories are evaluated together for the team ranking. Two single, two pair and two four-in-hand results per nation are included in the ranking.

== Para-driving ==
Para-driving is combined driving for disabled people.

== FEI classification system ==
The FEI encodes driving competitions with "CA", for the French Concours d'Attelage, and adds a letter for a national competition (CAN) or international (CAI). A national event is limited to competitors of that nation, who take part according to the regulations of their national federation, however foreign athletes may take part by invitation. An international event must be organised under FEI Statutes, General Regulations and Sport Rules, and may be open to competitors of all national federations. CAI competitions are primarily for individual athletes. However, at World Championships, competitions for national teams of three or four competitors run concurrently with the individual competition.

There are two categories of international competitions – CAI-A and CAI-B. The CAI-A category denotes a higher level of organisation and facilities provided.

Normally, it is assumed that a CA classified competition is for horses. If pony classes are involved, the letter P is added to the classification (e.g. CAIP-A). Numbers denote the arrangement of horses in the class (e.g. CAI-A 2 is a competition for horse pairs, whereas CAIP-B 1/2/4 is a Category B competition for ponies, with classes for singles, pairs and four-in-hands).

World championships are denoted as Champion at du Monde Attelage (CH-M-A). There are three World Championships for horses – Singles, Pairs and Four-in-Hand. These are held every two years, with Single Horse (CH-M-A 1) and Four-in-Hand (CH-M-A 4) Championships in an even-numbered year, and Horse Pairs (CH-M-A 2) every odd year. In addition, a World Combined Pony Championships (CH-M-AP, which include singles, pairs and four-in-hand) are held every odd-numbered year.

FEI World Cup Driving, is a series of competitions for four-in-hand horse teams. Introduced in 2001, it provides an exciting style of competition which takes place in an indoor arena. The course combines marathon and cone driving obstacles. Five or six drivers, each with a team of four horses take turns to drive the course against the clock. World Cup Driving events are classified as CAI-W and take place throughout the winter months (Nov to April).

Competitions for drivers with disabilities are classified as CPEAI (Paralympic Equestrian) and the championships (CH-M-PE-A) are held in every odd-numbered year.

At the National level (CAN) the sport is governed by each country's National Federation, sometimes through a governing body, which will have rules based on the FEI Rulebook, but maybe with some variations. Most countries hold their own National Championships.

Most people will start driving by joining a local organisation or club, who organise training sessions and one- or two-day competitions. Keen drivers can qualify to take part in national events from which they may put themselves forward to be selected to represent their country at international competitions or World Championships. Because a driver always needs a groom (backstepper or navigator), it's possible to take part as such and to enjoy the competition as much as the driver.

== See also ==
- List of World Champions in Driving (horse)
