= Georgina Hunt =

English artist (1922-2012

- Born: 15 June 1922; Reading, Berkshire, England
- Died: 16 April 2012 (aged 89)
- Resting place: Highgate Cemetery
- Education: Slade School of Fine Art
- Known for: Abstract painting

Georgina Hunt (15 June 1922 – 16 April 2012) was an English abstract painter and artist.

== Biography ==
Hunt was born in Reading, Berkshire, one of seven children to a local builder. She attended a local convent school where, among other achievements, she won a prize in the annual Royal Drawing Society exhibition. Hunt trained to become a teacher but after a health scare gave up that profession and enrolled at the Slade School of Art in London in 1945, where she was taught by William Coldstream. Before leaving the Slade in 1950, Hunt met and married a fellow student, Peter Atkins. Atkins was a sculpture student who became an assistant in Henry Moore's studio in Hertfordshire.

In 1953 Hunt and Atkins moved to the Natal when he took a post at the Ndaleni art school near Pietermaritzburg. The art school was the only one in the country for black South Africans but refused to admit women students. Hunt was restricted in the amount of teaching she could undertake but was active in the successful campaign to get the school to admit female students. Hunt returned to Britain in 1959 and in her art adapted a powerful abstract style, which often seemed to suggest plant forms and growth. She had a number of well reviewed exhibitions, including several at the Drian Gallery in London. From 1970 to 1972 Hunt was based in New York City, with a studio space in Manhattan. She met many of the most important artists active in the city at that time, most notably Jules Olitski who, like other proponents of Color Field painting, had a great influence on her work. Hunt began painting large canvases dominated by luminous veils of colour. She began using spray-guns, rather than brushes, to apply paint and create abstract works with a sense of mystery and calmness. A large exhibition of these works was held at the Camden Arts Centre in 1982. A series of four solo exhibitions were held at the Space Studios in London between 1974 and 1978. Other solo exhibitions took place at the Barbican Centre in 1998 and at Winchester Cathedral in 1999. In 1998, Hunt was recognized at the Osaka Triennale when she was awarded the Osaka 21st Century Association Prize.

Hunt and Atkins divorced after her return from New York and she eventually began a relationship with the artist Alistair Ewen who remained her partner for the rest of her life. Her ashes are interred on the eastern side of Highgate Cemetery. Shortly after her death in 2012, a retrospective exhibition was held at the Cello Factory gallery in London.
