= Boyd Exell =

Australian carriage driving competitor

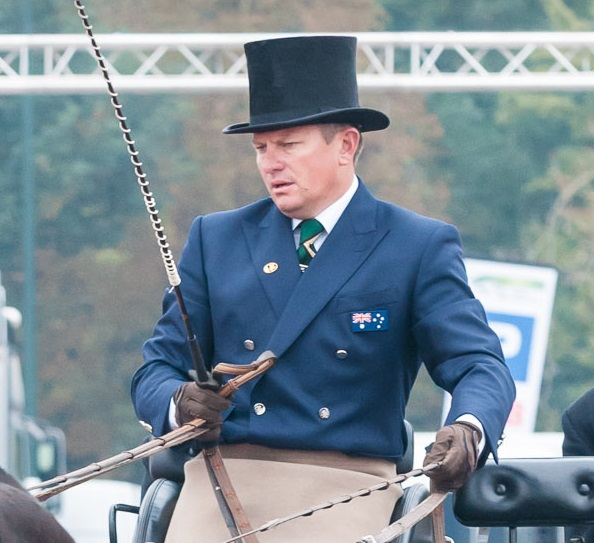
- Boyd Exell in 2014

Personal information
- Born: 29 July 1972 (age 54)
- Website: boydexell.com

Sport
- Country: Australia
- Sport: Equestrianism
- Events: Carriage driving, combined driving
Medal record
Representing Australia
World Championship
Bronze medal – third place	2008 Netherlands	Individual driving
Gold medal – first place	2012 Germany	Individual driving
Gold medal – first place	2016 Netherlands	Individual driving
Gold medal – first place	2022 Italy	Individual driving
Gold medal – first place	2024 Hungary	Individual driving
Bronze medal – third place	2024 Hungary	Team driving
Gold medal – first place	2026 Germany	Individual driving
Silver medal – second place	2026 Germany	Team driving
FEI World Equestrian Games (Note: WEG format was discontinued in 2018.)
Gold medal – first place	2010 USA	Individual driving
Gold medal – first place	2014 France	Individual driving
Gold medal – first place	2018 USA	Individual driving
FEI World Cup Final
Gold medal – first place	2009 Sweden	Individual driving
Gold medal – first place	2010 Switzerland	Individual driving
Gold medal – first place	2011 Germany	Individual driving
Gold medal – first place	2012 France	Individual driving
Silver medal – second place	2013 France	Individual driving
Gold medal – first place	2014 France	Individual driving
Gold medal – first place	2015 France	Individual driving
Silver medal – second place	2016 France	Individual driving
Gold medal – first place	2017 Sweden	Individual driving
Gold medal – first place	2018 France	Individual driving
Gold medal – first place	2020 France	Individual driving
Silver medal – second place	2022 Germany	Individual driving
Gold medal – first place	2023 France	Individual driving
Silver medal – second place	2024 France	Individual driving
Gold medal – first place	2025 France	Individual driving
Bronze medal – third place	2026 France	Individual driving

Boyd Exell (born 29 July 1972) is an Australian horse driver, trainer, judge and horse owner who specialises in competing with four-in-hand teams in the combined driving sport. He has won the World Cup indoor driving finals eleven times and won eight world champion titles. As of August 2026, Exell is ranked number one in the world for his sport. Stationed in the Netherlands since 2015, he travels to Australia, the United States and around Europe holding events to train drivers.

== Career ==
Along with competing in four-in-hand driving sports, Exell has been active in breaking, training, buying and selling horses. He has trained drivers in America and across Europe, and sought talented drivers to mentor. He has provided horses and carriages for weddings and funerals, and driven coaches for sponsors and owners.

The nice thing about carriage driving is that we can host our sponsors and owners and we can take them to Royal Ascot on a coach (an English Park Drag) with a team of horses. We can take 10 to 12 guests and we can have three days of racing. We set off from the Royal Mews in Windsor Castle, head down through Windsor Great Park, spend the day racing, have lunch and take the guests home. That is one of the upsides of driving, to be able to host your owners and your sponsors in that way.

— Boyd Exell (2020)

Exell was a judge for the Fédération Équestre Internationale (FEI) from 2010 to 2020, and Deputy Chair of the FEI Driving Committee from 2012 to 2014.

Annually, he hosts the Driving Valkenswaard International combined driving competition at his farm in the Netherlands. Exell trains other drivers at his farm and travels internationally to hold seminars on driving.

== Competitions ==
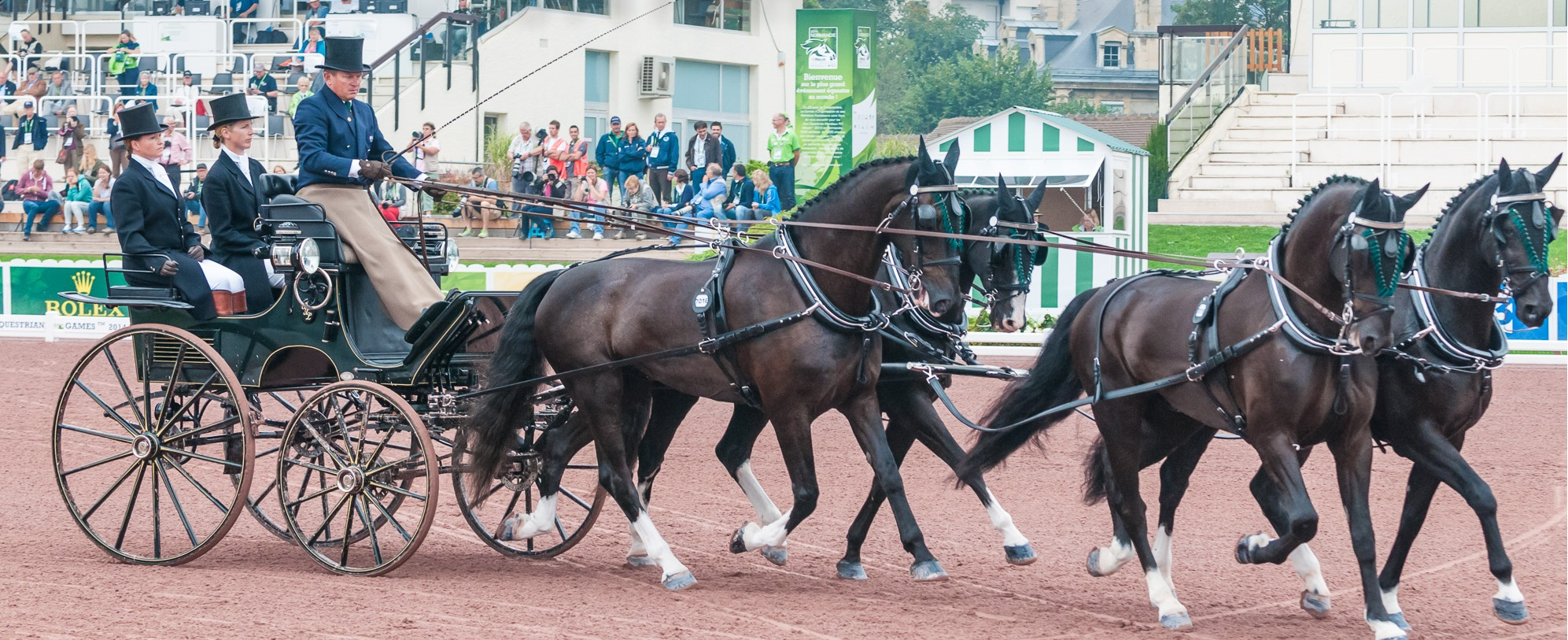
Exell performing driven dressage at the 2014 World Equestrian Games

Boyd Exell has won 74% of his FEI competitions, with 187 wins out of 254 starts. (Note: Statistics counted from 1 January 2010 to 31 August 2026.) As of August 2026, FEI ranked Boyd Exell number 1 worldwide for Driving World Cup Standings and Driving World Ranking - Four-in-Hand, and second for Driving World Cup Qualification Standings. He won world championship competitions in 2010, 2012, 2014, 2016, 2018, 2022, 2024 and 2026, and placed third in 2008. He won the World Cup indoor driving competition eleven times (2009, 2010, 2011, 2012, 2014, 2015, 2017, 2018, 2020, 2023, 2025), placed second four times (2013, 2016, 2022, 2024), and placed third in 2026.

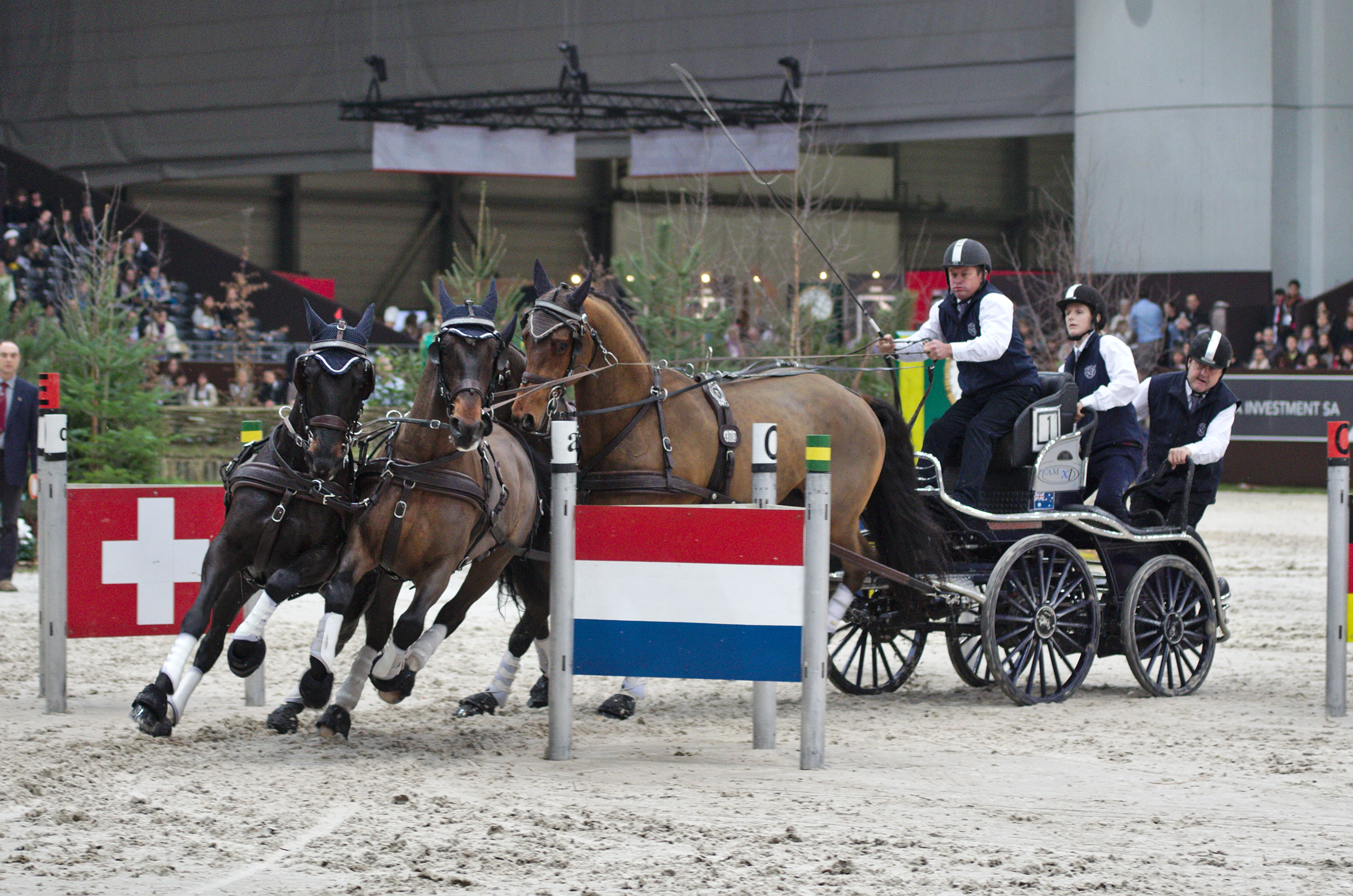
Exell during the 2013 World Cup series in Geneva, Switzerland

Boyd Exell became the individual world champion for the first time at the 2010 World Equestrian Games in Kentucky, and repeated this success at the 2012 World Championships in Germany with the same team.

In August 2013, Bill 22, Exell's best lead (Note: "Leaders" are the two horses at the front of a team of four. The two horses at the rear are called "wheelers".) horse, died at the age of 21. Bill was an Orlov Trotter born in 1992, previously driven by Michael Freund with whom he won five consecutive World Cup Finals, beginning with a 2002 victory in Sweden. Exell started driving Bill in 2007, and won a bronze medal with him at the World Championships in the Netherlands in 2008. They went on to win four consecutive World Cup Finals, from 2009 to 2012. According to Exell, "Bill taught me that you could trust him at top speed through the obstacles and he could still be careful and responsive."

Exell at the 2014 World Cup finals in Bordeaux, France

In 2014, Exell won the title of individual world champion in France. He repeated his win in the Netherlands in 2016, in North Carolina in 2018, in Italy in 2022, in Hungary in 2024, and in Germany in 2026.

Exell was British National Champion eight times, and won the driving competition at CHIO Aachen twelve times (2003, 2009-2013, 2016, 2017, 2019, 2022, 2023, 2024).

In 2023, Boyd Exell won his 10th World Cup Finals, and in 2025 he won his eleventh. In January 2023, the announcer declared Exell "number one in the world... more titles than any other driver in history."

== Accolades ==
Boyd Exell was awarded an Order of Australia in the 2014 Queen's Birthday Honours list for services to equestrian sports. In 2017, Exell was inducted into the Equestrian Australia Hall of Fame for his achievements in driving. Equestrian Australia named him the International Athlete of the Year in 2010, 2013, 2014, 2015, and 2016. In 2015, the FEI honored Exell with the Reem Acra Best Athlete award. (Note: Fashion designer Reem Acra is a patron and sponsor of numerous FEI awards and events.)

In 2014, his team of horses was named IRT International Horse of the Year. (Note: IRT is an international horse transport company, and the sponsor of the award.) The team of five geldings were aged 7 to 20 years old; two were Dutch Warmbloods (KWPN).

"It's hard to find reliable leaders who are honest and forward. Horses at the back need to be honest, reliable powerful and hard-working – but the ones at the front that need to be brave and independent are harder to get... chasing the perfect team is like chasing the pot of the gold at the end of the rainbow." —Boyd Exell

In a 2021 presentation of his competition career, FEI said of Exell, "Behind Boyd's success lies his genuine love of horses and a deep sense of connection with his animals, and it's this mutual understanding between Exell and his horses that has made them a formidable partnership on the international carriage driving stage, and truly an equestrian icon".

== Personal life ==
Boyd Exell was born 29 July 1972, in Bega, Australia, where he and his siblings were raised. His father was a civil engineer and his mother was a schoolteacher. Exell is married, has two children, and enjoys boating and water skiing. Boyd always loved horses. He and his brother Kent learned to drive horses early on and competed as young boys. At 16, Boyd started to compete seriously in driving competitions in Australia and won the Australian National Championships with a Hackney Pony pair. As a backup to a career with horses, and due to pressure from his mother, he apprenticed with a local engineering firm.

When he was 21, he travelled to the United States, then settled in England near London to learn more about horse sports and carriage driving, and to improve his riding and driving talent. He stayed in England for 20 years before moving to Valkenswaard, Netherlands in 2015.
