= IJsbrand Chardon =

Dutch equestrian (born 1961)

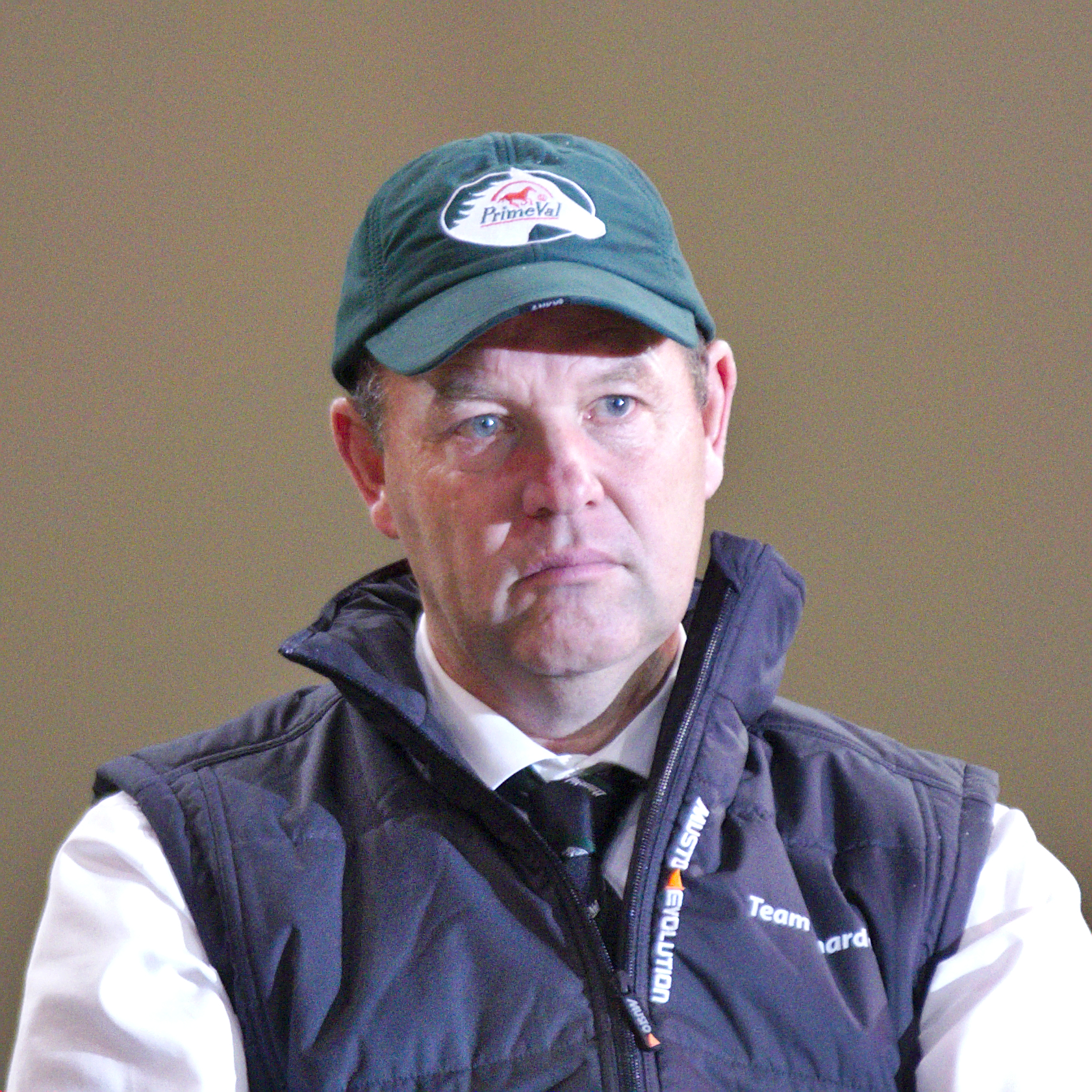
- IJsbrand Chardon (2013)

Personal information
- Born: 2 January 1961 (age 65)
Medal record
Equestrian
Representing the Netherlands
FEI World Equestrian Games
| Bronze medal – third place | 1990 Stockholm | Individual driving |
| Silver medal – second place | 1990 Stockholm | Team driving |
| Bronze medal – third place | 1994 The Hague | Individual driving |
| Bronze medal – third place | 1994 The Hague | Team driving |
| Gold medal – first place | 1998 Rome | Team driving |
| Gold medal – first place | 2002 Jerez | Individual driving |
| Gold medal – first place | 2002 Jerez | Team driving |
| Silver medal – second place | 2006 Aachen | Individual driving |
| Bronze medal – third place | 2006 Aachen | Team driving |
| Silver medal – second place | 2010 Kentucky | Individual driving |
| Gold medal – first place | 2010 Kentucky | Team driving |
| Gold medal – first place | 2014 Normandy | Team driving |
FEI World Driving Championships
| Gold medal – first place | 2026 Aachen | Team driving |

IJsbrand Chardon, Round 1 at World Cup Driving Final 2014 in Bordeaux.

IJsbrand Chardon (born 2 January 1961) is a Dutch equestrian and multiple World Champion at the World Equestrian Games.

Chardon competes in the driving disciplines and became World Champion for the first time in 1988, when he won the gold medal in the individual event in Apeldoorn. Two years later he added his second world title, this time in the team event in Stockholm 1990. In Riesenbeck, Germany another two years later he won his second individual gold, this time in the Four-in-Hand World Championships.

In his own country during the 1994 World Equestrian Games in The Hague, he added two bronze medals from both the team and individual disciplines. In Rome 1998 he was unable to equal his individual bronze, finishing fourth, but with his team mates he won yet another World title, his third in his career. He went on to succeed in the sport when he added two silver medals to his tally at the 2000 Four-in-Hand World Championships in Wolfsburg.

His best career achievement came in 2002 when he won two World Championships titles in one season, winning both the team and individual events at the 2002 World Equestrian Games in Jerez de la Frontera. Four years later in 2006 he could not defend his titles, but won a silver medal as an individual and a bronze with his team. Prior to that result he had won a silver in the team and bronze medal in the individual race at the Four-in-Hand World Championships in Kecskemét 2004.

Chardon also won 19 Dutch national titles (1983, 1986, 1988 to 2000, 2002, 2003, 2005, 2006), two FEI World Cups (2004–05, 2005–06) and two times the FEI Top Driver Award (1997, 2003, 2nd in 2004).
