= Tally Ho =

Tally-ho is a phrase used in hunting.

Tally Ho and Tallyho may refer to:

== Places ==
=== United States ===
- Tally Ho Township, Granville County, North Carolina
- Tallyho, West Virginia, a community
- Tally-Ho Plantation House, a mansion in Louisiana, on the National Register of Historic Places

=== Australia ===
- Tally Ho, Victoria, a locality within the suburb of Burwood East, Victoria

== Music ==
- Tally Ho! (album), a 1998 album by Luke Vibert under the alias Wagon Christ
- "Tally Ho!", the 1981 debut single by The Clean
- "Tally Ho", a single released in 2020 by Australian psychedelic rock band Psychedelic Porn Crumpets, also a track on the album Shyga! The Sunlight Mound

== Business ==
- Aladdin (hotel and casino), opened in 1962 as the Tallyho Hotel
- The Tally Ho, Finchley, London, a public house
- Tally-Ho (rolling papers), a brand of cigarette rolling paper sold in Australia
- Tally Ho, a product line of the United States Playing Card Company
- Tally Ho, a seasonal barley win produced by Adnams, an English regional brewery

== Other uses ==
- Tally-Ho (coach), a common name for fast stagecoach services in 19th century Britain, and a particular American road coach
- Tally Ho (yacht), a British yacht
- HMS Tally-Ho, a British submarine which was built and served in the Second World War
- Tally-Ho, nickname of Lord James Blears (1923–2016), British-American professional wrestler, ring announcer, promoter and actor
- Tally-Ho! Open Tennis Championships, a former clay court tennis tournament held at the Tally Ho Lawn Tennis Club, Edgbaston, Birmingham, England
- The Tally Ho, the fictional daily newspaper featured in the UK television series The Prisoner

== See also ==
- Cookstown/Tally-Ho Field Aerodrome, near Cookstown, Ontario, Canada
