= Tally-Ho (coach) =

Fast coaches from the 1800s

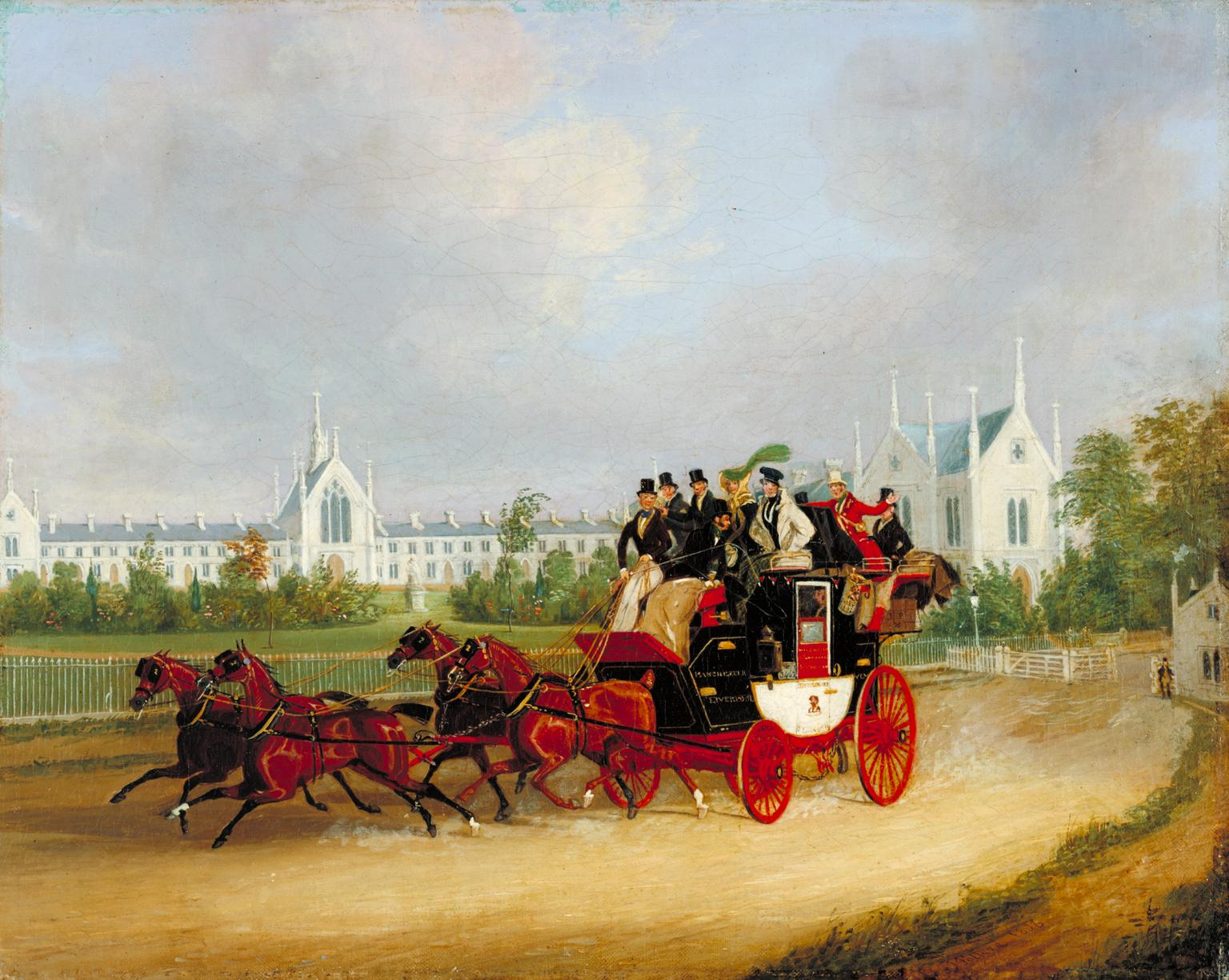
1836 painting of Tally-Ho by James Pollard

Tally-Ho was a name applied to a series of fast stagecoach services operating in early 19th-century Britain. The name was later adopted by the American DeLancey Kane for his coach which became a symbol of the Gilded Age revival of road coaching. "Tally-Ho" eventually became a general term for large or rapid coaches.

== British stagecoach services ==
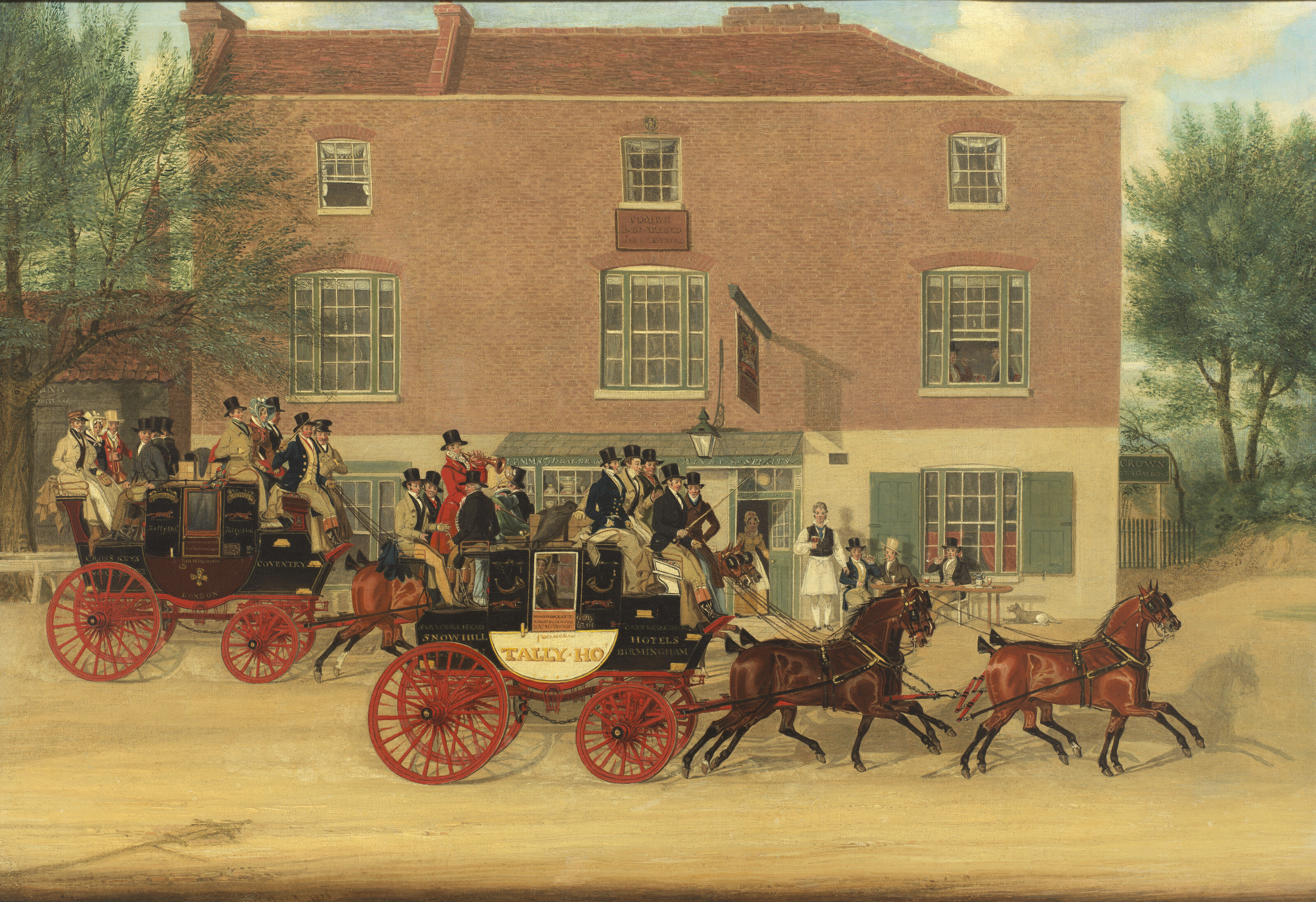
James Pollard's 1826 painting depicting two of the numerous Tally-Ho branded coaches of the day

Sarah Mountain, who operated a coaching inn and coach factory in London, launched the first fast day-coach service between London and Birmingham in 1823. Known as Mountain's Tally-Ho, it covered the 109 miles (175 km) route in 11 hours. Mountain built coaches and rented them out to other proprietors who drove the route.

William Horne, a shrewd business competitor, opened his Independent Tally-Ho! service shortly thereafter, poaching Mountain's customers by departing an hour earlier each morning. Soon, many other "Tally-Ho!" services were operated simultaneously. On May 8, 1830, the Independent Tally-Ho! traveled the 109 miles in just 7 hours 39 minutes, recorded using 6 separate proprietors and 7 legs of the journey. According to Oliver Belmont in 1901, "This was 'the' record which stands for the best time ever made, I believe, when coaching was at its zenith in England."

== The American Tally-Ho coach ==
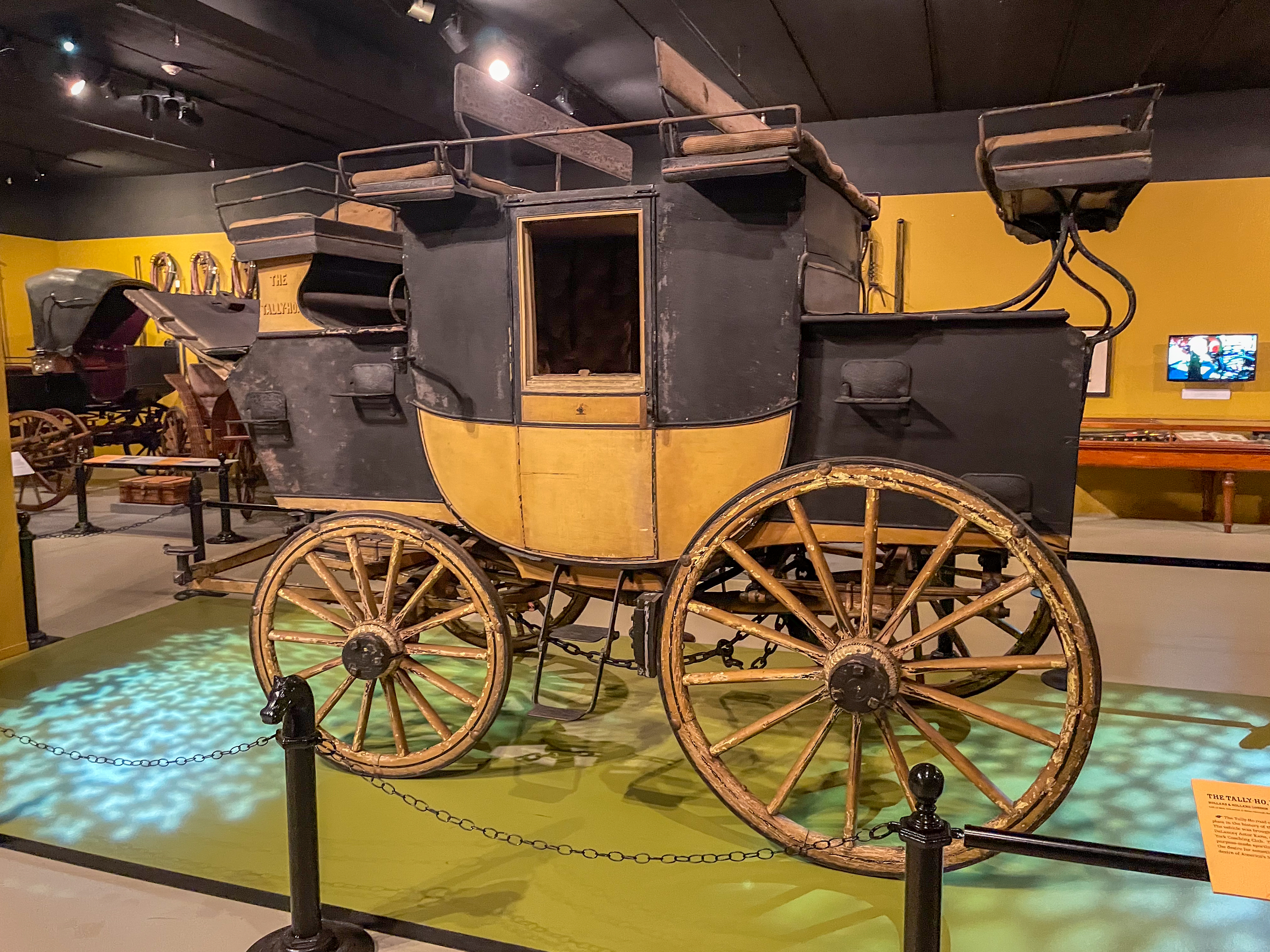
Kane's coach at Long Island Museum of American Art, History, and Carriages (2025)

Kane's coach in 1876

The American DeLancey Astor Kane purchased one of these coaches, a yellow and black 1875 model by Holland & Holland coachbuilders, which he imported from England in 1876, and named Tally-Ho!. He and other members of the Coaching Club of New York routinely drove this coach as a private pleasure road coach, which was widely covered in the news in the 1870s and 80s.

Per one writer in 1893,

This coach was the first public coach ever run in America on the English plain...the word 'Tallyho' has become a part of the American language, and is the commonly used word in America for an English coach and a coaching trip is invariably referred to in the newspapers and novels of the day as a 'tallyho party'.

In 1933, Kane's widow donated the Tally-Ho! coach to the Museum of the City of New York. In 2008 it was transferred to the Long Island Museum of American Art, History, and Carriages, which put the coach on display and began a project to conserve it.

== Coaches inspired by Kane's Tally-Ho ==
Following the popularity of Kane's Tally-Ho! coach, several of his contemporaries commissioned similar vehicles from the Abbot-Downing Company—known for their construction of Concord coaches, not English coaches. Archived Abbot-Downing order forms referred to these as "tally-ho" coaches, although carriage historians classify them as road coaches or park drags. The Carriage Journal documents four such coaches.

These coaches were built and delivered in the late nineteenth century, though the fates of some remain uncertain. James Vanderburgh Parker of New York received a "Kanes Style English Coach" in 1877, but its whereabouts are now unknown. Colonel Ely Ely-Goddard of Rhode Island acquired another coach in 1882, which was later sold to Frank Jones of New Hampshire, though its present location is likewise lost. A further park drag dating to around 1886 survives only through a contemporaneous photograph taken by Abbot-Downing, as they routinely photographed their finished vehicles accompanied by a large plaque.

The fourth and best-documented example is the 1879 sight-seeing coach built for Frank A. Philbrick of New Hampshire, known then as the Farragut Tally-Ho. Used for excursions and transporting hotel guests, it featured French-windows (side-lights flanking the door) typical of Concord coaches rather than the usual park drag style of none. The coach was shipped to the Henry Ford Museum in 1930, was damaged in a 1970s fire, (Note: The Carriage Journal article says 1979, however it was probably destroyed in the widely-publicized 1970 fire.) and its remains were sold at auction in 1990. Joel E. Brown of Oregon reconstructed the coach from the iron work and the original design, making a few modifications for modern driving, and restorations were completed for Mr. and Mrs. John Landan of Pennsylvania. Renamed the Farragut Coach, it appeared at the Devon Horse Show in 1991, where it earned third place in the appointments class.

These vehicles illustrate how the name 'tally-ho' was applied loosely in the United States to a variety of four-in-hand coaches inspired by Kane's example.

== Colloquial usage ==
The term "Tally-Ho!" became a colloquialism for "a fast coach" in England, and for a four-in-hand pleasure coach in the USA. However, according to coaching-expert Fairman Rogers and carriage historian Donald Berkebile, the usage of "tally-ho" as a popular American term for a road coach came from Kane's popular road coach, whereas the use as a generic term for all coaches is "entirely incorrect" and was perpetuated by the Century Dictionary in 1891.

== See also ==
- Coach (carriage)
- Posting and staging
- Stagecoach
- Coaching Club of New York
- Driving club
- Tally-ho – Traditional English hunting cry
