= Berguer =

Berguer is a surname. Notable people with the surname include:

- David Berguer (born 1939), British local historian and author
- Ramon Berguer, American professor of vascular surgery

== See also ==
- Berger
