= James Vanderburgh Parker =

American heir and social leader

- Born: December 15, 1830; Troy, New York, U.S.
- Died: January 11, 1917 (aged 86); New York City, New York, U.S.
- Education: Heidelberg University
- Parent(s): Charles Maverick Parker; Cornelia Vanderburgh Parker

James Vanderburgh Parker (December 15, 1830 – January 11, 1917) was an American heir and social leader who was prominent in New York society during the Gilded Age.

== Early life ==
Parker was born on December 15, 1830, in Troy, New York, and grew up "in the old Parker home at the southwest corner of Fifth Avenue and Fifteenth Street" near Stuyvesant Square. He was the third child born to Charles Maverick Parker (1797–1872) and Cornelia (née Vanderburgh) Parker (1807–1886), who married in Troy, New York, in 1826. Of the four children, he was the only to live to maturity.

His paternal grandparents were John Parker and Elizabeth (née Phillips) Parker of the "noted old Parker family of Boston" and his maternal grandparents were James Vanderburgh, the Town Clerk of Schodack and brother of Henry Vanderburgh, and Martha (née Strong) Vanderburgh of the old "Knickerbocker Dutch" Vanderburgh family of Albany.

== Career ==
Parker received his education in France and at Heidelberg University in Heidelberg, Baden-Württemberg, which is Germany's oldest university. After his return from Germany, he became a member of many clubs and was reportedly an "expert amateur billiard player, whist player, pigeon shot and whip, and when the Coaching Club was organized by Col. William Jay, DeLancey Kane and others, Mr. Parker was one of its most enthusiastic members, turning out many smart teams for the club's annual parades."

== Personal life ==
Parker, a "fashionable bachelor of Mrs. Astor's entourage", who never married, inherited a large share of the fortune which has enabled him to be a lifelong man of leisure. In 1892, Parker was included in Ward McAllister's "Four Hundred", purported to be an index of New York's best families, published in The New York Times. Conveniently, 400 was the number of people that could fit into Mrs. Astor's ballroom. Parker was noted as a "wit and a linguist" with a striking personal appearance due to his tall, military bearing and white hair. "He spoke French like a native and had the manners of a king."

He owned a cottage in Newport, Rhode Island, known as "Sans Souci" and located on Merton Road where he was generally one of the first summer residents to open his cottage and one of the last to leave. In 1897, he publicly challenged the Newport Assessors to "come into court and show before a Judge that their valuation is fair and reasonable" as he felt the tax assessment was overvalued. In Newport, he was a member of the Newport Reading Room, where he socialized with August Belmont, C.C. Baldwin, and General Prescott Lawrence (who donated the land to build the Groton School). At the time of his death, he was considered one of Newport's oldest summer residents.

Parker died at his home, 253 Madison Avenue in New York City, on January 11, 1917, at the age of 86, leaving an estate worth $2,000,000. In his will, he left his Newport estate to Mrs. Evelyn Kimball Richmond, the wife of Harold A. Richmond of Provincetown, Massachusetts. His relatives contested the validity of the will as he later tore out the page of the will where he left the Newport home to Mrs. Richmond. After his death, Ogden Codman, the Boston architect and interior decorator, leased Sans Souci for the summer.
