= David Berguer =

British local historian and author (1939–2024)

David Ian Berguer (25 October 1939 – 17 September 2024) was a British local historian and author, and the chairman of the Friern Barnet and District Local History Society. His books include The Friern Hospital Story (2012), the story of the former Colney Hatch Asylum.

== Writing ==
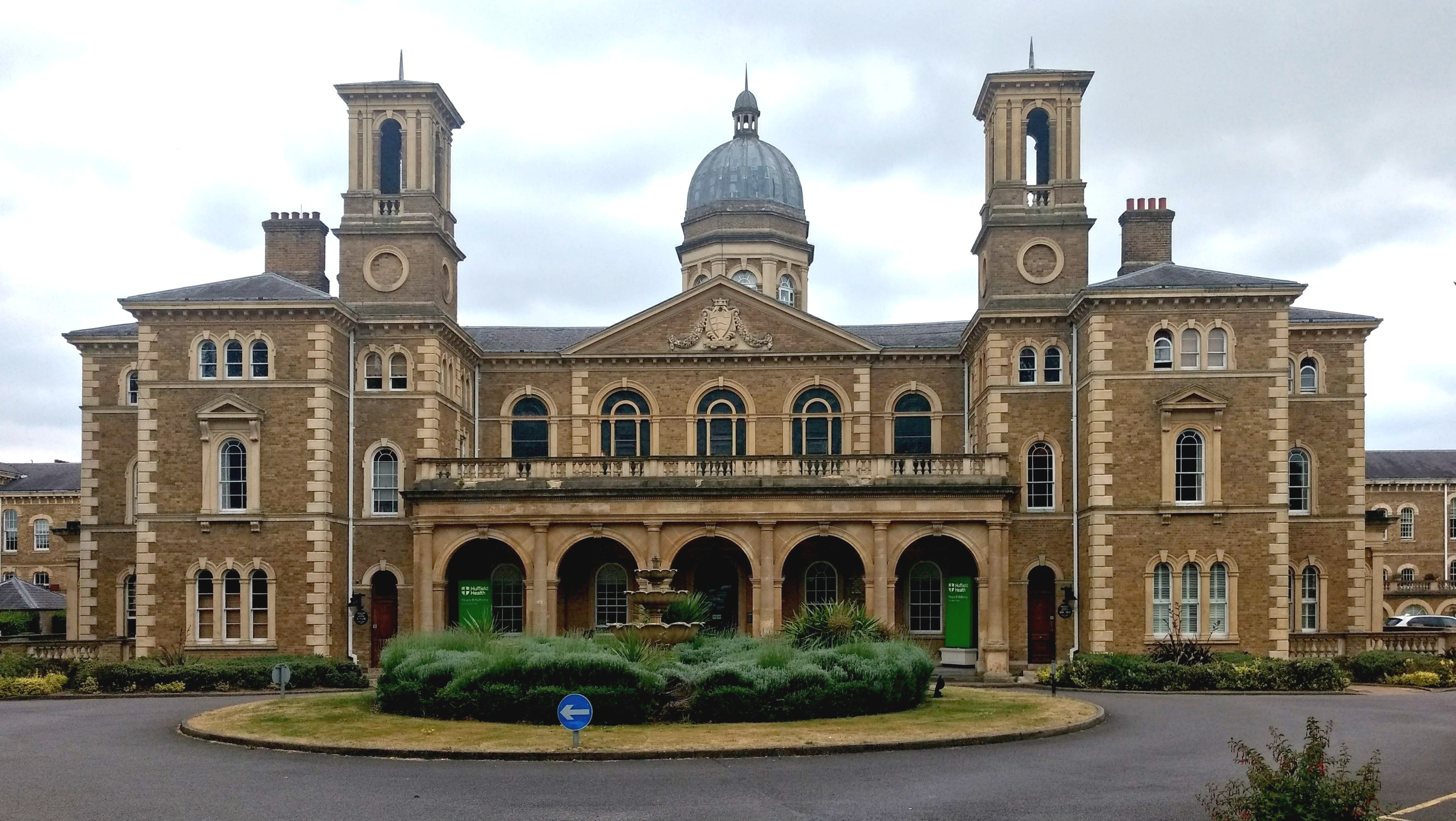
Friern Hospital, the subject of Berguer's major work.

His career was in media management in the advertising industry. He retired in 2000 and at that time was one of the founders of the Friern Barnet and District Local History Society. His first book was Under the Wires at Tally Ho, an examination of the trams and trolleybuses that once served the area of Finchley in north London.

This was followed by The Friern Hospital Story, which examined the complete history of the former Colney Hatch Asylum, later known as Friern Hospital, from its design and opening in 1851 to its closure in 1993, and subsequent conversion to flats known as Princess Park Manor. In 2014 the book was named by the London & Middlesex Archaeological Society the best single topic publication written by a member of their 55 affiliated local history societies.

In 2014, Berguer produced All over by Christmas, an examination of conditions on the home front in Barnet during the First World War for which he and a team trawled local newspapers from the wartime period to extract the source material. He originally thought the book would be short but there was so much information available that the final work was nearly 300 pages long. In 2016, he produced Whetstone Revealed with John Heathfield.

Berguer died on 17 September 2024, at the age of 84

== Selected publications ==
- Under the Wires at Tally Ho: Trams and Trolleybuses of North London, 1905-1962. The History Press, Stroud, 2011. ISBN 978-0752458755
- The Friern Hospital Story. Chaville Press, London, 2012. ISBN 978-0-9569344-4-4
- All over by Christmas. Chaville Press, London, 2014. ISBN 978-0-95693449-9
- Whetstone Revealed. Chaville Press, London, 2016. (With John Heathfield) ISBN 978-0993006333

== See also ==
- The Tally Ho, Finchley
