= Coaching Club of New York =

Social club in New York City

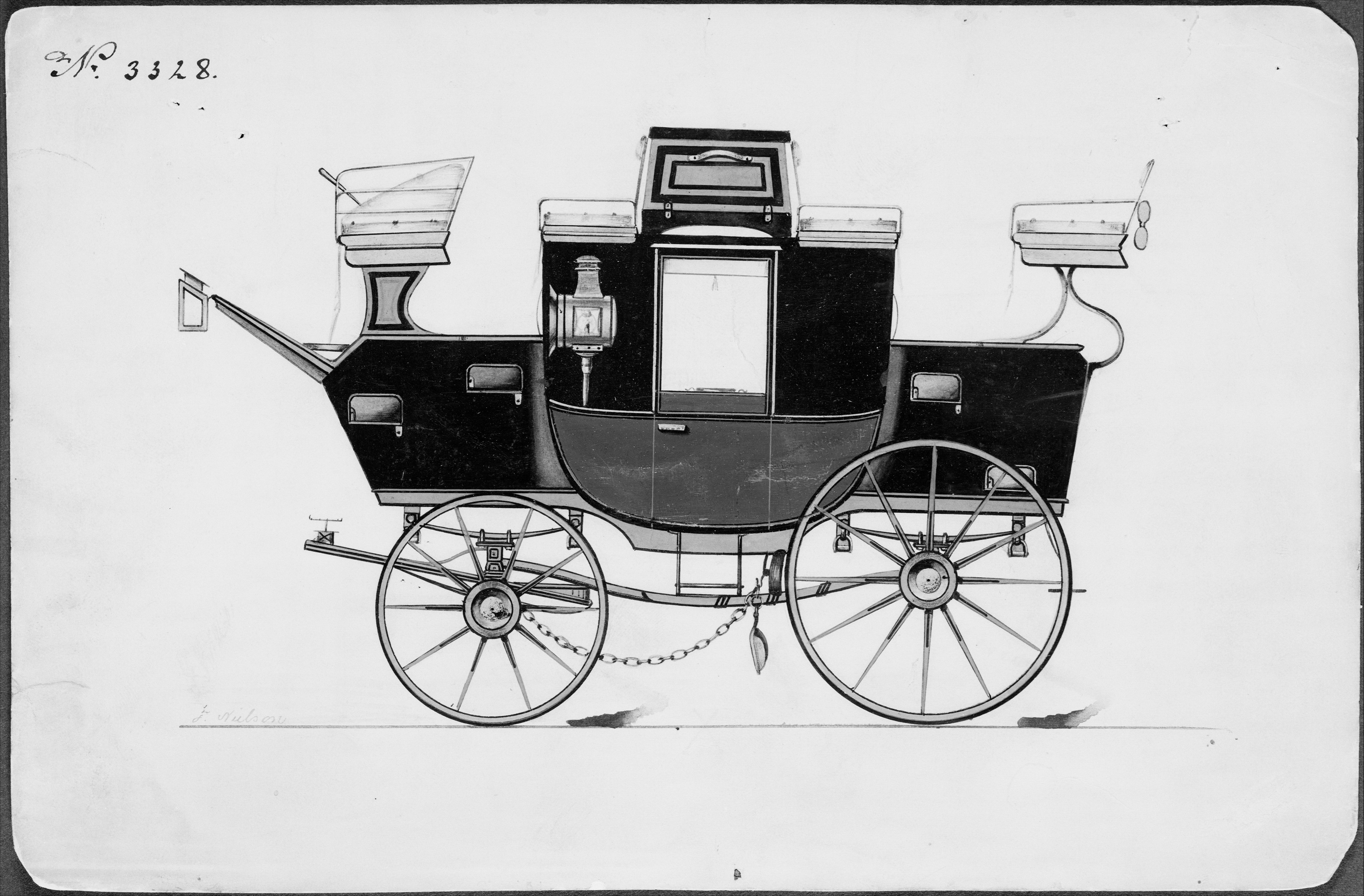
A Brewster design for a park drag

The Coaching Club (also known as The Coaching Club of New York, New York Coaching Club, and Coaching Club of America) was formed in New York City in 1875 to encourage four-in-hand driving in America. "Requisite for membership was the ability to handle a coach and four horses with a single group of reins."

== History ==
Initiated by Colonels DeLancey Kane and William Jay, the club had its first official meeting at the Knickerbocker Club on Fifth Avenue on December 3, 1875. The Knickerbocker Club became its headquarters. Later some activities were moved nearer Central Park to the Metropolitan Club, nine members of which were founders of the Coaching Club.

== Activities ==
There were regular events, dinners and annual parades through Central Park.

The annual meet of the New York Coaching Club ... was a thrilling and colorful event. About fifteen drags usually assembled at the Brunswick Hotel in Twenty-sixth Street, and drove up to and around Central Park, and back in time for dinner at the hotel. The prettiest women in town, in crisp summer gowns and leghorn hats, with bouquets of cornflowers, daisies or buttercups, flowers to match the racing colors of the host, sat atop the coaches. The men wore the Coaching Club uniforms, green coats with gray top hats, and boutonnieres. Even the horses were dressed, with flower rosettes behind their ears. —Florence Jaffray Harriman

Typical of their coaching meets, in 1901 twenty-six coaches gathered in Hyde Park, New York and set off for an outing.

In 1917, the Coaching Club inaugurated the Coaching Club Handicap, a stakes race for 3-year-old fillies at Belmont Park. Today it is a Grade I race at Saratoga Race Course called the Coaching Club American Oaks.

== Membership ==
Qualification for membership: "the ability to drive four horses with grace and skill". Driving four-in-hand requires the whip (driver) to hold the reins of all four horses in one fist.

Coaching was a very expensive pursuit and membership, at first restricted to fifty then thirty people at any one time, was limited to those owners and drivers of coaches drawn by four horses that had no involvement in racing, hunting or polo. It became difficult to keep a full membership and from 1925 members were allowed those associations.

=== Pioneer road coach ===
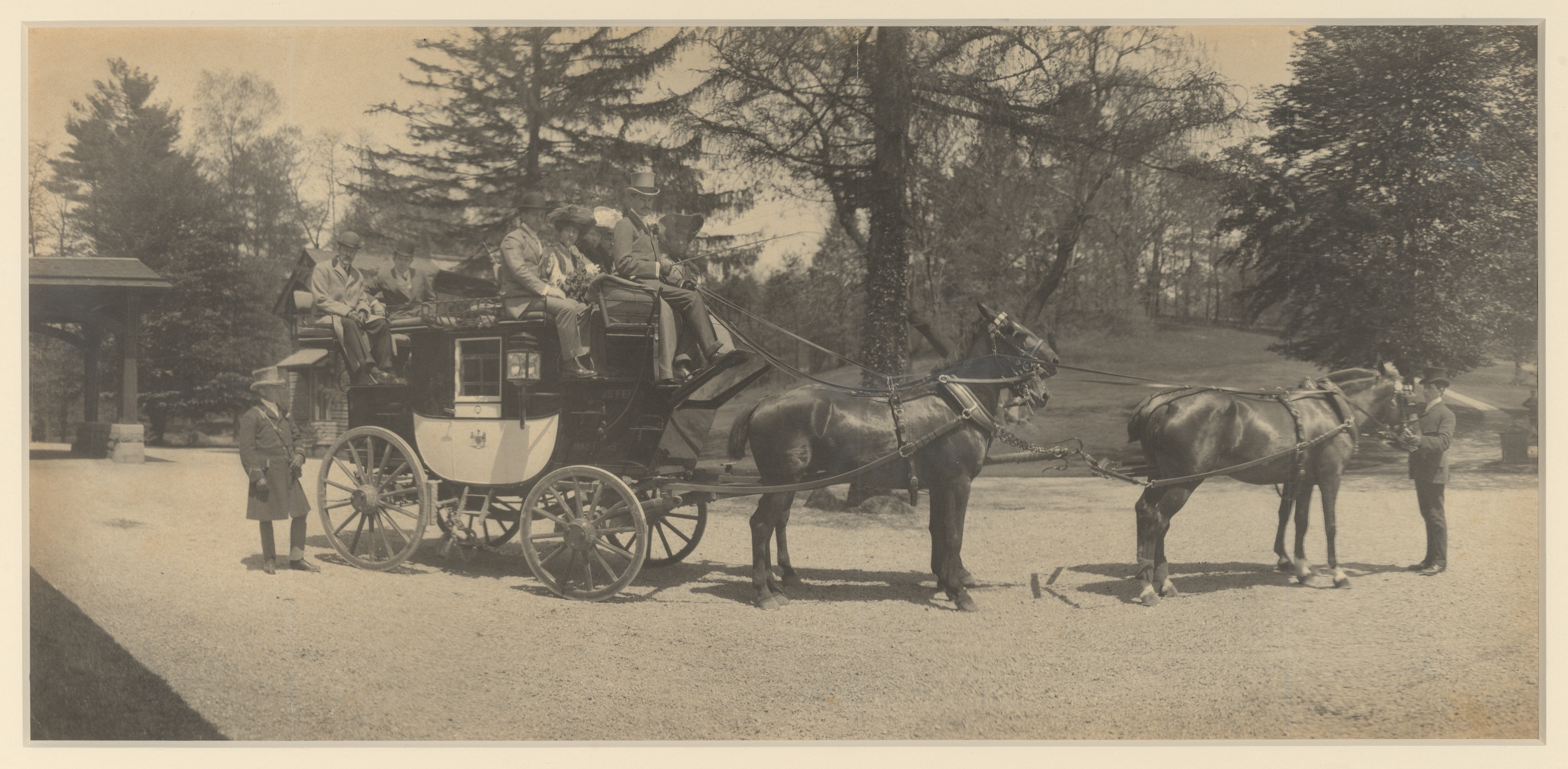
Alfred Vanderbilt driving Pioneer

The club owned its own coach, named Pioneer, which made daily runs between Holland House and Ardsley, New York for three years, a distance of 54 miles round trip.

The general public could buy seats in members' coaches and be driven about by the club members. When it was pointed out the result was New York's aristocracy carried common citizens, members responded that some of the English aristocracy had driven scheduled public services for some time.

=== Tally-Ho road coach ===
One of the original Coaching Club coaches was named Tally-Ho. Built in 1875 by Holland & Holland coachbuilders in London, it was purchased by Colonel Kane and brought to New York in 1876. It became so well known that any coach-and-four was called a tally-ho by the general public. Kane's Tally-ho was donated to the Museum of the City of New York in 1933, and is now in the carriage collection at the Long Island Museum of American Art, History, and Carriages in Stony Brook, New York.

"This coach was the first public coach ever run in America on the English plain... the word 'Tallyho' has become a part of the American language, and is the commonly used word in America for an English coach and a coaching trip is invariably referred to in the newspapers and novels of the day as a 'tallyho party.' —Rider and Driver Journal, 1893

== Similar clubs in America ==
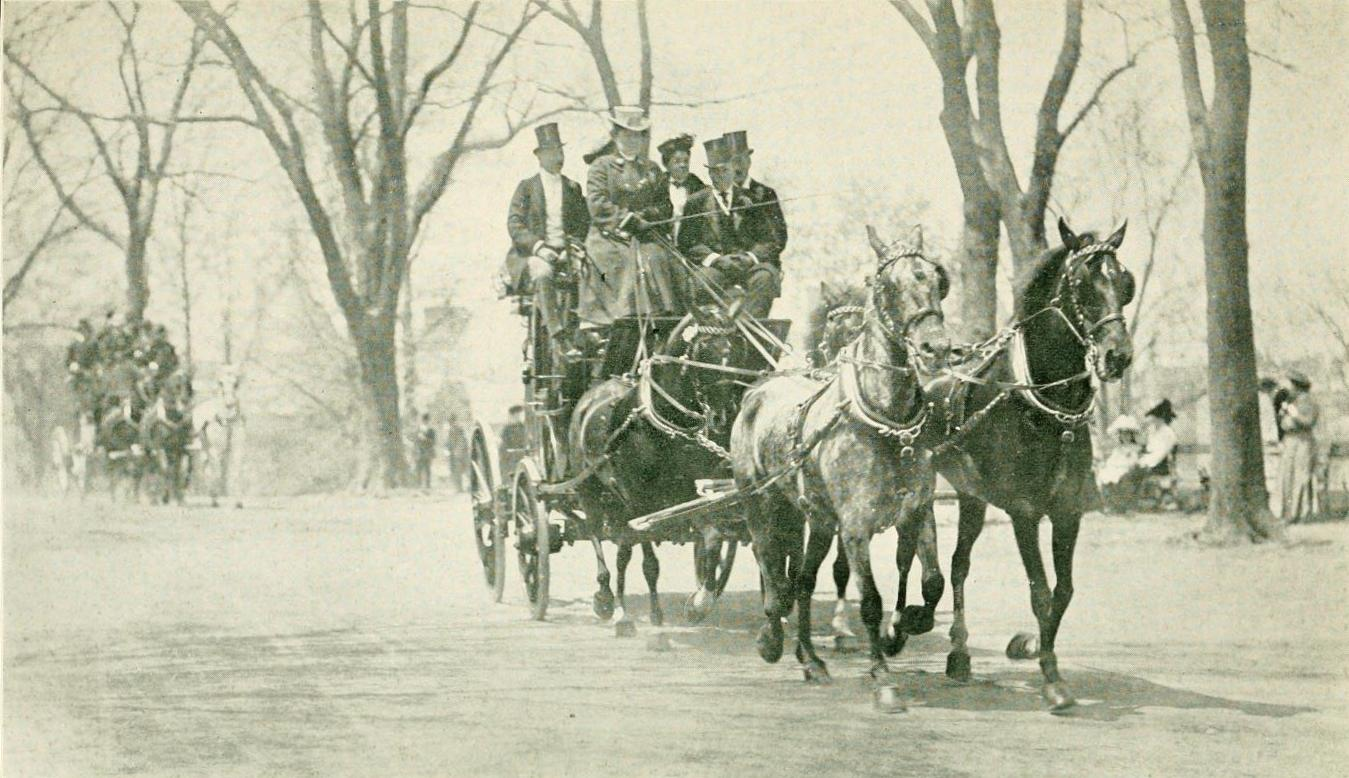
Ladies' Four-in-Hand Driving Club meet, 1906

- Four-in-hand Club of New York
- Four-in-hand Club of Philadelphia
- Ladies Four-in-Hand Driving Club
- Stamford Coaching Club
- World Coaching Club

== See also ==
- Driving club
- The Fairman Rogers Four-in-Hand (a painting)
