= Long Island Museum of American Art, History, and Carriages =

Museum in Stony Brook, New York

Coordinates: 40°54′43″N 73°8′30″W

The Long Island Museum of American Art, History, and Carriages
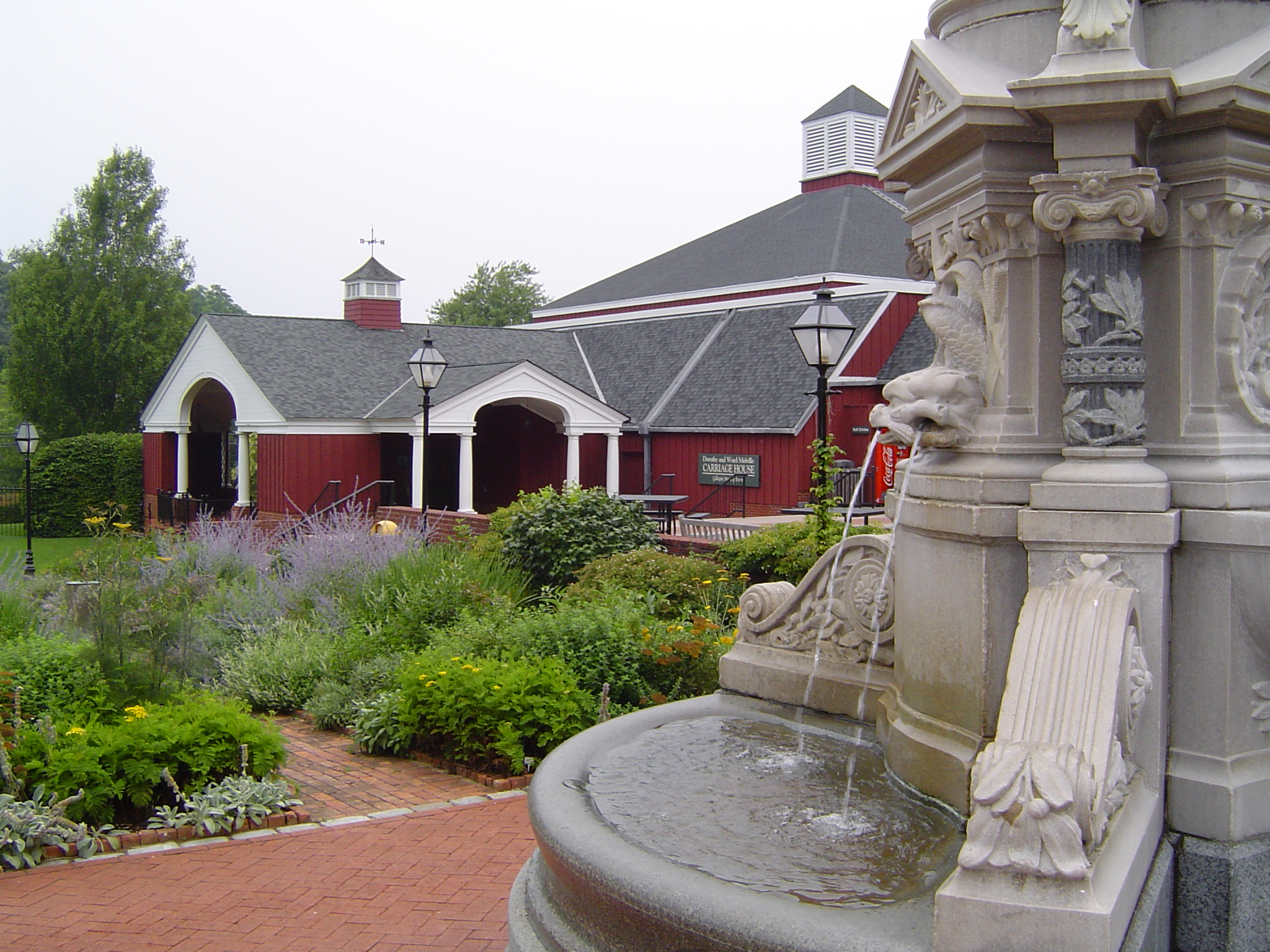
- Established: 1939
- Location: 1200 Route 25A; Stony Brook, New York, 11790
- Type: art museum, local history museum, transport museum
- Founder: Ward Melville
- Website: longislandmuseum.org

The Long Island Museum of American Art, History, and Carriages, known as the Long Island Museum (LIM), is a nine-acre museum located in Stony Brook, New York. The LIM serves the Long Island community by preserving and displaying its collection of art, historical artifacts, and carriages; providing educational and public programming; and collaborating with a variety of other arts and cultural organizations.

== Mission statement ==
The Long Island Museum inspires and engages visitors of diverse ages, backgrounds, and abilities by connecting them with the region’s art and history, a world-class carriage collection, and energizing programs that foster a creative and inclusive community.

== Vision Statement ==
The Long Island Museum (LIM) is committed to creating a community where commonalities and differences are better understood, a free exchange of ideas is encouraged, and all are welcome. We strive to help our visitors and our neighbors deepen their understanding and appreciation of where we live, who we are, and who we are becoming. Through our captivating exhibitions and engaging programming for all, the LIM collects, preserves, interprets, and celebrates Long Island’s richly diverse past and its storied role in our nation’s history. And through the unique treasures of our horse-drawn vehicle collection, we explore an important chapter in the nation’s transportation past. We aim to be a place where people can return repeatedly for unique and enlightening experiences.

== History ==
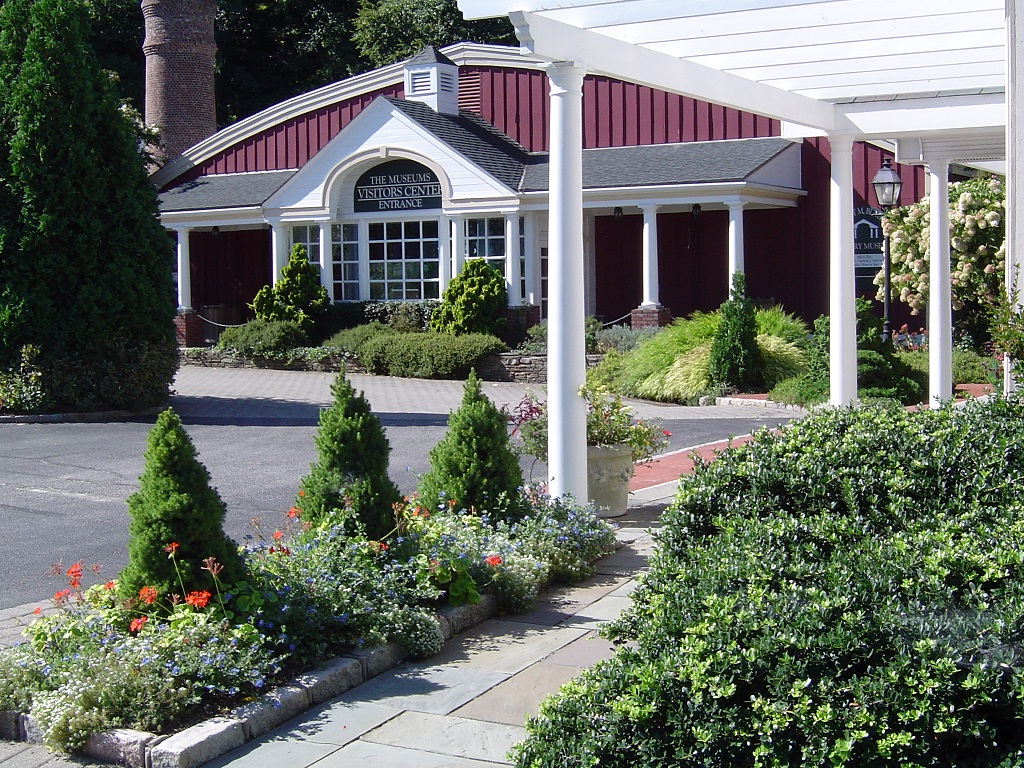
The Long Island's Visitor Center

The Long Island Museum was founded in 1939 as the Suffolk Museum by local philanthropist Ward Melville, who was an active community and corporate leader. Melville established the museum with the help of his wife, Dorothy Bigelow Melville; prominent naturalist Robert Cushman Murphy; a well-regarded local doctor Winifred Curtis; and insurance broker O.C. Lempfert. The concept for a museum in Stony Brook originated when O.C. Lempfert, avid hunter and taxidermist, displayed his hunting trophies and specimens at friend Archie Rayner's home. He called his collection Suffolk County Museum of Natural History. In 1935, Winifred Curtis began bringing the neighborhood children to see Mr. Lempfert's collection. When the Rayner home was sold in 1939, Curtis appealed for help from Mrs. Ward Melville to find a new location for the collection. Persuaded by Mrs. Melville, the collection was moved to an empty building known as the Stone Jug, owned by local pharmacist Charles J. Zimmerlein. The Little Museum in the Jug as it came to be called, was formally incorporated as the Suffolk Museum on December 28, 1939.

In 1948, Ward Melville purchased the Stony Brook Hotel and its surrounding property. This allowed for the expansion of the museum and its growing collections that correlated with his goals of renovating Stony Brook into a more historic-looking village. The purchase and subsequent renovations allowed the "Little Museum in the Jug" to move to a more sustainable, viable space. The expanded space also accommodated Ward Melville's interest in horses and pleasure driving with the construction of the Carriage House. Containing eighty vehicles and related artwork, the Carriage House opened to visitors on July 7, 1951.

During the 1950s a number of period buildings were moved to the museum's grounds including the late nineteenth-century Samuel H. West Blacksmith Shop located in Setauket, Long Island. The shop was owned by Samuel H. West (1853–1938) and was fully operational until his death in 1938.

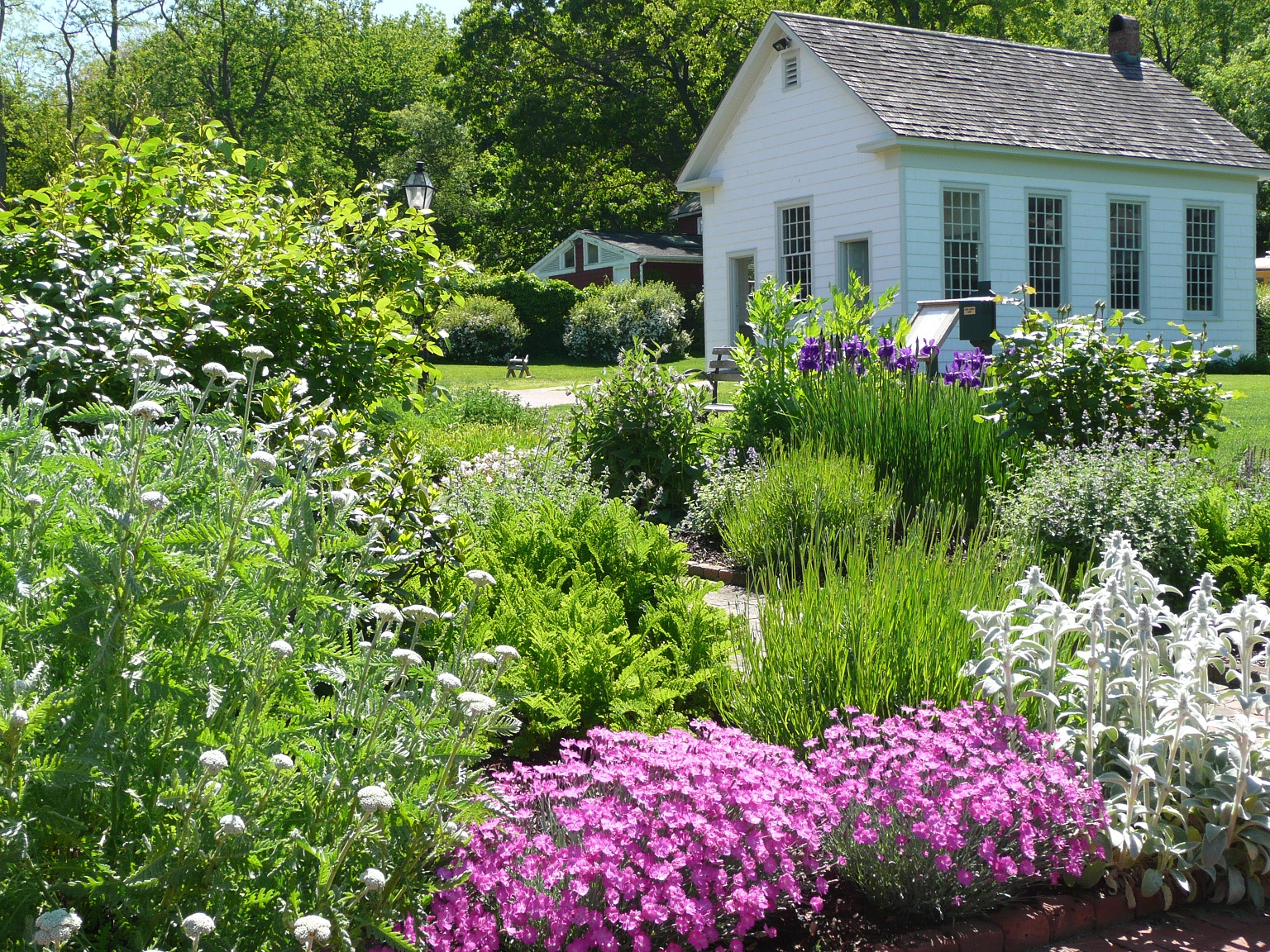
Nassakeag Schoolhouse, built in 1877, LIM Grounds

In 1956, the one room Nassakeag Schoolhouse was acquired and relocated to the museum grounds. The schoolhouse was built by Frederick A. Smith in 1877 and was actively used until 1910. Also in 1956, the Ploch-Williamson Barn was donated and moved to the museum's grounds. Built in 1794 by Jedidiah Williamson, the Ploch-Williamson Barn is a significant structure to local and agricultural history. It originally stood on 30 acres of farmland in Stony Brook. The barn was donated and moved to the museum in 1956. Like the Nassakeag Schoolhouse and the Samuel H. West Blacksmith Shop, museum educators conduct programs throughout the school year for students within and around the barn.

After receiving its accreditation by American Alliance of Museums in May 1973, the Board of Trustees approved a new name and concept for the Suffolk Museum. The Museums at Stony Brook was adopted as the new name for the museum which had grown to be recognized by its three distinct collections – art, history, and carriages.

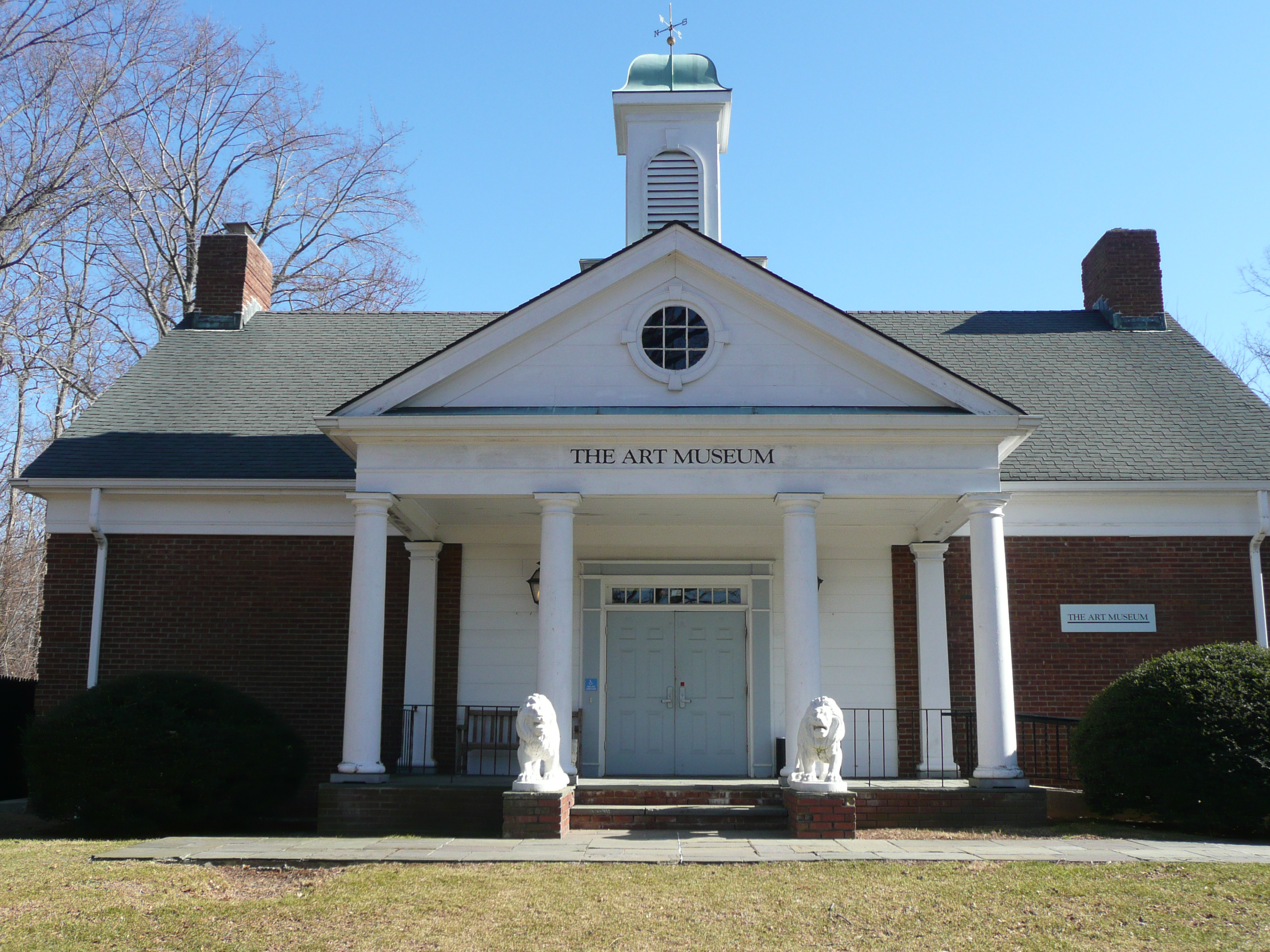
Art Museum, built in 1973

The 1970s also brought an expansion of collection housing and exhibition space, with the original space now too small to accommodate the ever-growing collection and needs of the museum. In 1973, this desire led to the completion of the Art Museum, which was designed by Becker & Arelt to be located on the east end of the grounds. Becker & Arelt also designed the renovations of the old D. T. Bayles Lumber Mill across Route 25A as the new facility for the history collection. The renovations would be completed in 1977 thus establishing the History Museum. The 1980s saw a demand for an increase in exhibition/storage space for the growing carriage collection with the Carriage House no longer fit to accommodate the museum's needs. It was demolished in 1985, with the exception of a wing converted to administrative offices and educational space. The new Carriage Museum opened in 1987 and provided much needed storage and exhibition space.

In 2000, the Museums at Stony Brook officially re-branded itself the Long Island Museum of American Art, History, and Carriages.

Today, the museum grounds are spread across both the north and south sides of Route 25A. The complex is home to seven buildings, which include the Art Museum, the History Museum/Visitors Center, the Carriage Museum, multiple storage sheds, and administrative offices. The grounds also feature outdoor sculpture (both permanent and temporary), a cemetery, gardens, outhouse, and a Beaux Arts horse fountain that once resided at the intersection of Madison Avenue and 23rd Street in New York City.

== Permanent collections ==
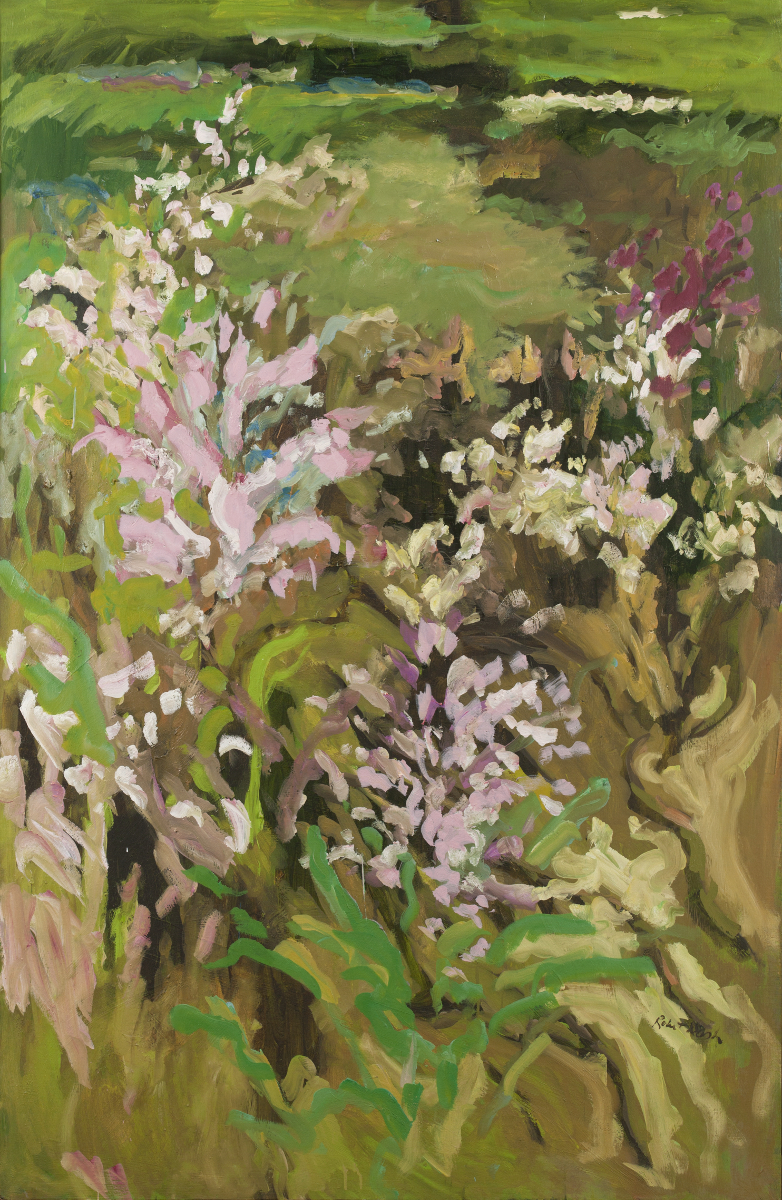
Garden Scene, oil on canvas, Robert Dash, 1921

The Long Island Museum serves its purposes through the acquisition and preservation of objects relevant to its collecting interests through exhibition, research, publication, and other educational programs related to its collections.

LIM's collection of more than 60,000 artifacts is subdivided into three categories – art and archives, history, and carriage.

== Art and archives collection ==
The museum's art collection, which consists of nearly 450 paintings, 2,000 works on paper, and 40 sculptural works, continues to grow through acquisitions and donations. Nationally known New York artists in the collection include William Sidney Mount, William Merritt Chase, Louis Comfort Tiffany, Charles Henry Miller, George Constant, Fairfield Porter, Jane Wilson, and Lumen Martin Winter. The museum's extensive archives, housed in the Kate Strong Historical Library, contain letters, diaries/journals, ledgers, and other assorted paper artifacts that tell the history of the region and the people that lived and worked in it. Informational resources are readily available to support the work of its staff and meet the research needs of scholars and the general public.

=== William Sidney Mount ===
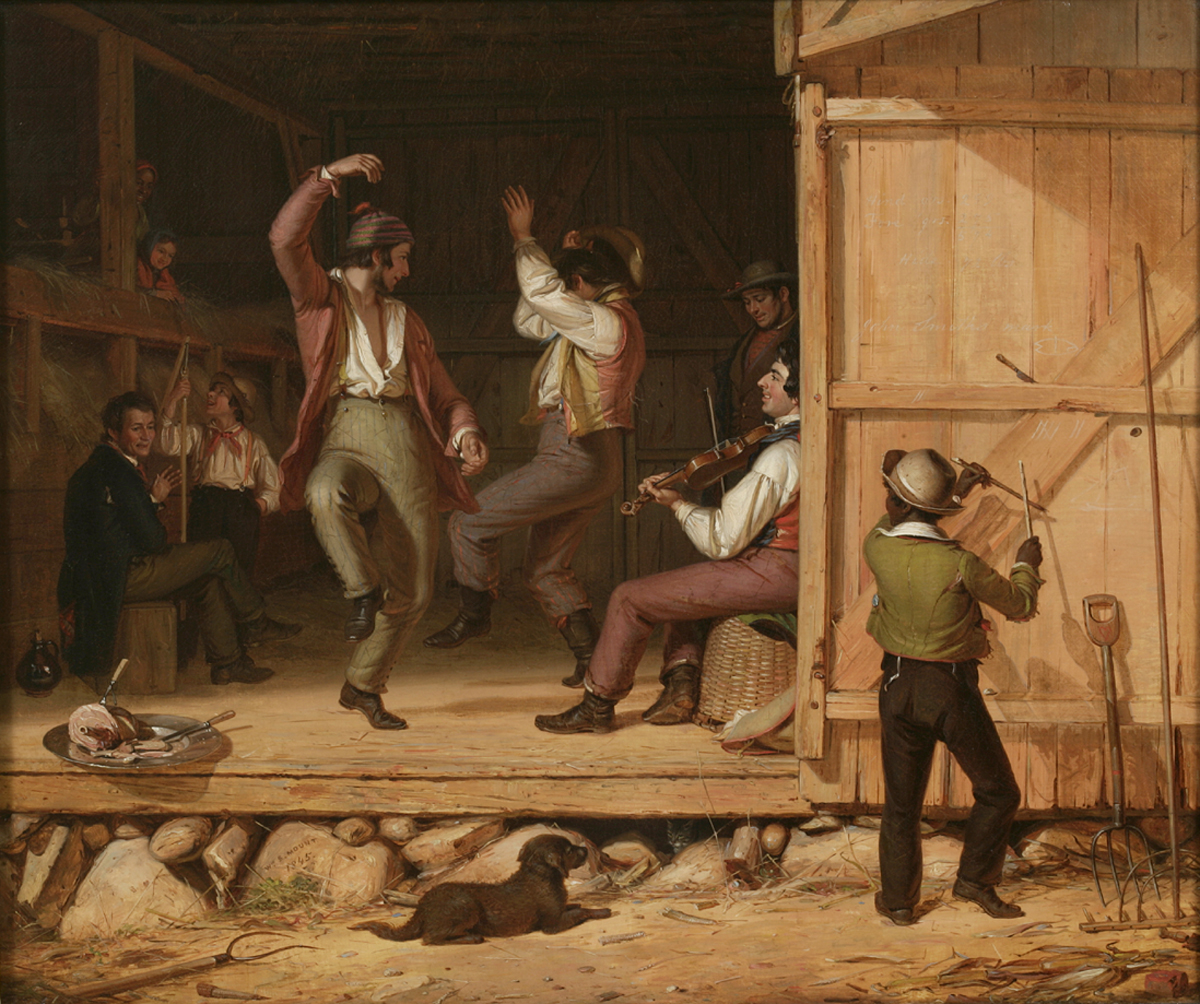
Dance of the Haymakers, William Sidney Mount, 1845

LIM holds the largest collection of William Sidney Mount (1807–1868) artwork, consisting of oil paintings, oil studies, watercolors, drawings, and an extensive archive, including personal and family papers and artifacts. The Mount Collection also consists of artwork from other gifted family members including his brother Shepard Alonzo Mount (1804–1868) and niece Evelina Mount (1837–1920). William Sidney Mount was one of the most popular and sought-after artists in America during his lifetime and was one of the first American artists to have his work widely distributed abroad. Today, Mount is still considered one of the most important American artists of the nineteenth century.

Dance of the Haymakers (1845), Farmers Nooning (1836), and The Banjo Player (1855) are just three of the more notable Mount paintings in the museum's extensive collection.

== History collection ==
Dress, nylon, sateen, silk, designed by Philip Hulitar, c. 1955

The museum's history collection contains a variety of artifacts that represent 19th- through late 20th-century material culture, emphasizing Long Island history. Its holdings include over 2,500 household artifacts, nearly 1,200 decorative and applied art including ceramics and glass, late 18th- to late 19th-century Long Island indigenous furniture, locally made bird decoys, and an array of textiles/costumes from the 1700s to the present.

=== Mary and Philip Hulitar Textile Collection ===
Roothead Heron, c.1935, carved by Eugene Cuffee, Shinnecock Native American

Part of LIM's history collection is its large clothing and textile subcollection. Its holdings include over 10,000 historic textiles from the eighteenth century to present and features men's, women's, and children's clothing. The focus is largely on East Coast American-made apparel with many notable New York merchants, dressmakers, tailors, and designers as well as representation for prominent European designers, such as Emilio Pucci and Jean Patou. Designers of this collection include Rudolph "Rudi" Gernreich, Bonnie Cashin, and Philip Hulitar. The collection includes undergarments, sleepwear, lounge wear, formal wear, military/work uniforms, and accessories such as hats, scarves, gloves, purses, and shoes. The largest concentration of textiles is in women's apparel, which contains numerous dinner gowns, outerwear, tops, bottoms, bathing suits, dusters, day/evening dresses, suits, work uniforms, jerseys, etc. Along with the costume collection, LIM has a small collection of quilts, coverlets, and samplers.

=== Decoy collection ===
Since its early beginnings, visitors have flocked to LIM for its impressive Long Island decoy collection. The collection holds over 210 folk art wildfowl decoys made by Long Island craftsmen and other noted eastern carvers.

== Carriage collection ==
The carriage collection is internationally renowned. The collection comprises nearly 200 horse-drawn vehicles, the majority of which are in original condition; over 25,000 non-vehicular artifacts, including the contents of the only known example of a fully equipped nineteenth-century American carriage manufacturer to have survived in its entirety; carriage and harness making tools; harnesses; and other related accouterments. The collection also is composed of over 225 carriage-related clothing items including hunting, leisure, and competition attire. The vehicles, which Ward Melville began collecting in the early 1940s, range from phaetons to sleighs to fire-fighting vehicles. The collection includes not only vehicles that originated in America, but European-style vehicles as well. The European gallery showcases carriages from parts of Bavaria, Italy, France, and England.

The Dr. Charles W. Gerstenberg Carriage Reference Library, which is located in the Carriage Museum, is a rich resource of historic prints, photographs, and rare books on every subject relating to the carriage era. The 700-square-foot library is open by appointment to researchers.

The Tally-ho Road Coach (1875) was given to the museum by the Museum of the City of New York in 2008. Made by Holland & Holland, of London, the carriage was purchased and brought to the United States by Col. Delancey Astor Kane (1844–1915), a wealthy founder of New York's Coaching Club. A canary-yellow and beautifully proportioned road coach, the Tally-Ho was driven four-in-hand style from Manhattan to Pelham, NY (and later, New Rochelle, NY) by Kane, beginning in 1876 and periodically each season into the early 1880s. The vehicle became nationally famous, providing excursions to New Yorkers of all backgrounds and was covered widely by prominent publications of the day.

Grace Darling omnibus, c. 1880

The Grace Darling Omnibus (c. 1880) was gifted to the museum in 1952 by St. Paul's School located in Concord, New Hampshire. This type of large horse-drawn omnibus, sometimes called a "barge" was used primarily in New England for excursions. Many of these vehicles were named for famous people or locations; this particular omnibus is named after Grace Darling, a popular maritime heroine who was responsible for the dramatic rescue of survivors from a shipwreck off the coast of England in 1838. This omnibus was operated by the Huntress family who owned a livery business in South Berwick, Maine from the 1860s to 1904 before being acquired by the St. Paul's school to transport athletic teams to sporting events.

Wells Fargo Wagon, c. 1870

The Wells Fargo Wagon (c. 1870) was gifted to the museum by the Railway Express Agency in 1959. The Wells Fargo Overland Express Company figured prominently in America's westward expansion by providing coach transportation for passengers and mail and operated banking offices throughout the West. This particular heavy type of mud wagon was manufactured by Abbot-Downing Company and painted in the Wells Fargo standard red and yellow while being devoid of any decoration and luxury components.

Bavarian State Coach, c. 1850

Four Bavarian State Coaches (c. 1850) from the Nymphenburg Palace in Munich, Germany were gifted to the museum by Dieter Holterbosch in 1967. A state coach was a formal vehicle used by royalty or high officials in processions on state business. These four state coaches belonged to Prince Albert of Bavaria (1818–1875), the youngest son of King Ludwig I of Wittlsbasch Dynasty.

The Gypsy Wagon (1860–1885) was accessioned into the collection in 1955. Gypsy wagons, sometimes called vardos, were used for traveling, for fortune-telling, and as residences. This particular vardo (Romani wagon) belonged to Mrs. Phoebe Broadway Stanley, sometimes known as the Gypsy Queen Phoebe, a resident of East Natick, Massachusetts. This partially restored vehicle is intricately decorated with landscapes and figurative paintings, half-spindles, beaded molding, painted gold four-leaf clovers, etched frosted glass, painted scroll work and much more.

== Education ==
A cornerstone of the museum's mission is education. In addition to the LIM's permanent and changing exhibitions, a range of educational programs provide life-long learning opportunities including workshops, family festivals, and lectures.

== Public programs ==
In conjunction with the school programs, the Education Department offers a number of public programming geared towards community members of all ages. Public programs include informative lectures, musical programs, and workshops throughout the year that tie in with our current exhibitions.

In the Moment is a program of art engagement for people with Alzheimer's disease and other forms of memory loss. The Education Department collaborates with facilities that work with this population in an interactive exhibition experience that sparks imagination and encourages participation.

Senior Tuesday runs one Tuesday each month, when the museum is normally closed to the public, where seniors 62 and older are invited to enjoy a free, self-guided tour of one exhibition.

Music@LIM is a music performance series which presents on-site concerts featuring diverse musical offerings through existing and new community collaborations, such as North Shore Pro Musica, the Greater Port Jefferson-Northern Brookhaven Arts Council and WUSB-FM Sunday Street Concert Series, Bluegrass Club of Long Island, and the annual LIM concert featuring high-profile artists.

== Publications ==
The museum has published publications including the following:

- Cassedy, David and Gail Shrott (1983) William Sidney Mount, Works in the Collection of the Museums at Stony Brook ISBN 0943924057 OL 3504186M
- Johnson, Deborah J. (1988) Shephard Alonzo Mount, His Life and Art
- The Long Island Museum (2014) 75@75 Treasures from the Collection
- The Museums at Stony Brook (1984) Catching the Tune, Music and William Sidney Mount
- The Museums at Stony Brook (1982) Highlights of the Collection
- The Museums at Stony Brook (1986) The Carriage Collection
- The Museums at Stony Brook (1987) The Carriage Museum
- The Museums at Stony Brook (1987) 19th Century American Carriages, Their Manufacture, Decoration and Use ISBN 0943924103 OL 27939222M
- Pike, Martha V. and Janice Gray Armstrong (1980) A Time to Mourn, Expressions of Grief in Nineteenth Century America
- Pisano, Ronald G. (1999) The Tile Club and the Aesthetic Movement in America
- Ruff, Joshua (2015) Gliding the Coasts: Art & Design of Long Island's Great Estates
- Townsend, E. Jane (1979) Gunners Paradise: Wildfowling and Decoys on Long Island
