= Tallyho, West Virginia =

Tallyho
- Unincorporated community
- Location within the state of West Virginia Tallyho (the United States)
- Coordinates: 39°16′51″N 81°26′22″W
- Country: United States
- State: West Virginia
- County: Wood
- Elevation: 666 ft (203 m)
- Time zone: UTC-5 (Eastern (EST))
  - Summer (DST): UTC-4 (EDT)
- GNIS ID: 1555777

Tallyho is an unincorporated community in Wood County, West Virginia, United States.
