= Tally-ho =

Traditional English hunting cry

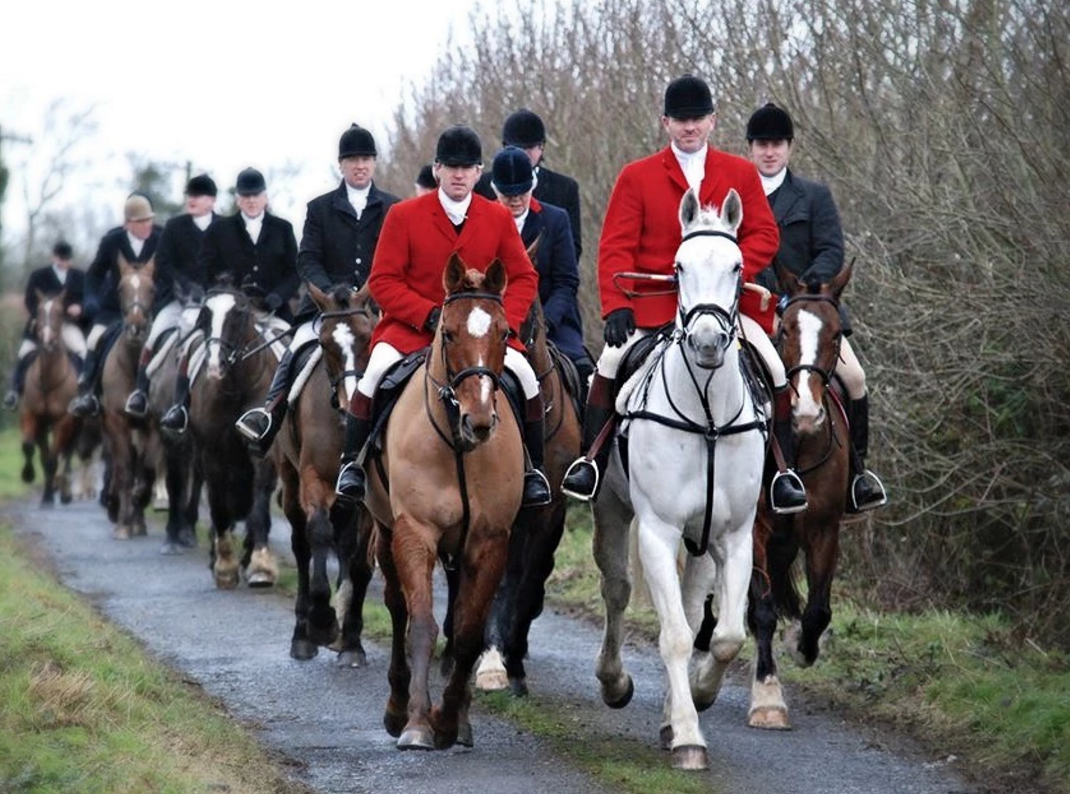
Huntsman and Master leading the Tipperary foxhounds between draws

"Tally-ho" is the traditional cry made by the huntsman to tell others the quarry has been sighted. It may also be used with directions, including "away" and "back".

First used in fox-hunting, it was adapted in the 19th century to describe some horse-drawn vehicles and in the 20th century to advise of enemy aircraft and space junk.

== Etymology ==
Tally-ho dates from around 1772, and is probably derived from the French taïaut, a cry used to excite hounds when hunting deer.

Taïaut may have originated in the second half of the 13th century by the concatenation of a two-word war-cry: taille haut, where "taille" is the cutting edge of a sword and "haut" means high or 'raised up'. So the original meaning might be something close to "Swords up!".

== Usage ==
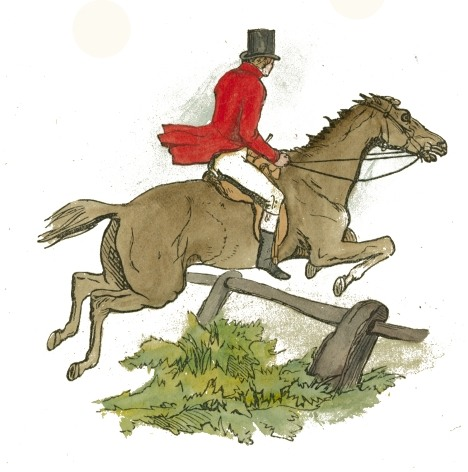

=== Fox-hunting ===
The cry was made by the huntsman on catching sight of the fox to alert other members of the hunt. It has been used in similar circumstances for quite different quarries:

=== Dog Sports ===
In lure coursing AKC events, a cry of "tallyho!" signals the beginning of the chase. After hearing the "T" in "tallyho," a handler is permitted to release the dog.

=== Royal Air Force ===
It was used by RAF fighter pilots in the Second World War to tell their controller they were about to engage enemy aircraft.

It was also used to announce to the squadron leader (or other person of command in the flight) the spotting of an enemy aircraft.

=== Royal Navy ===
The British T-class submarine HMS Tally-Ho was named after the hunting cry. It is the only vessel to bear the name. It was launched in 1942 and scrapped in 1967.

=== NASA ===
"Tally-ho" is also used by NASA astronauts in audio transmissions to signify sightings of other spacecraft, space stations, and unidentified objects.

=== Horse-drawn coaches ===
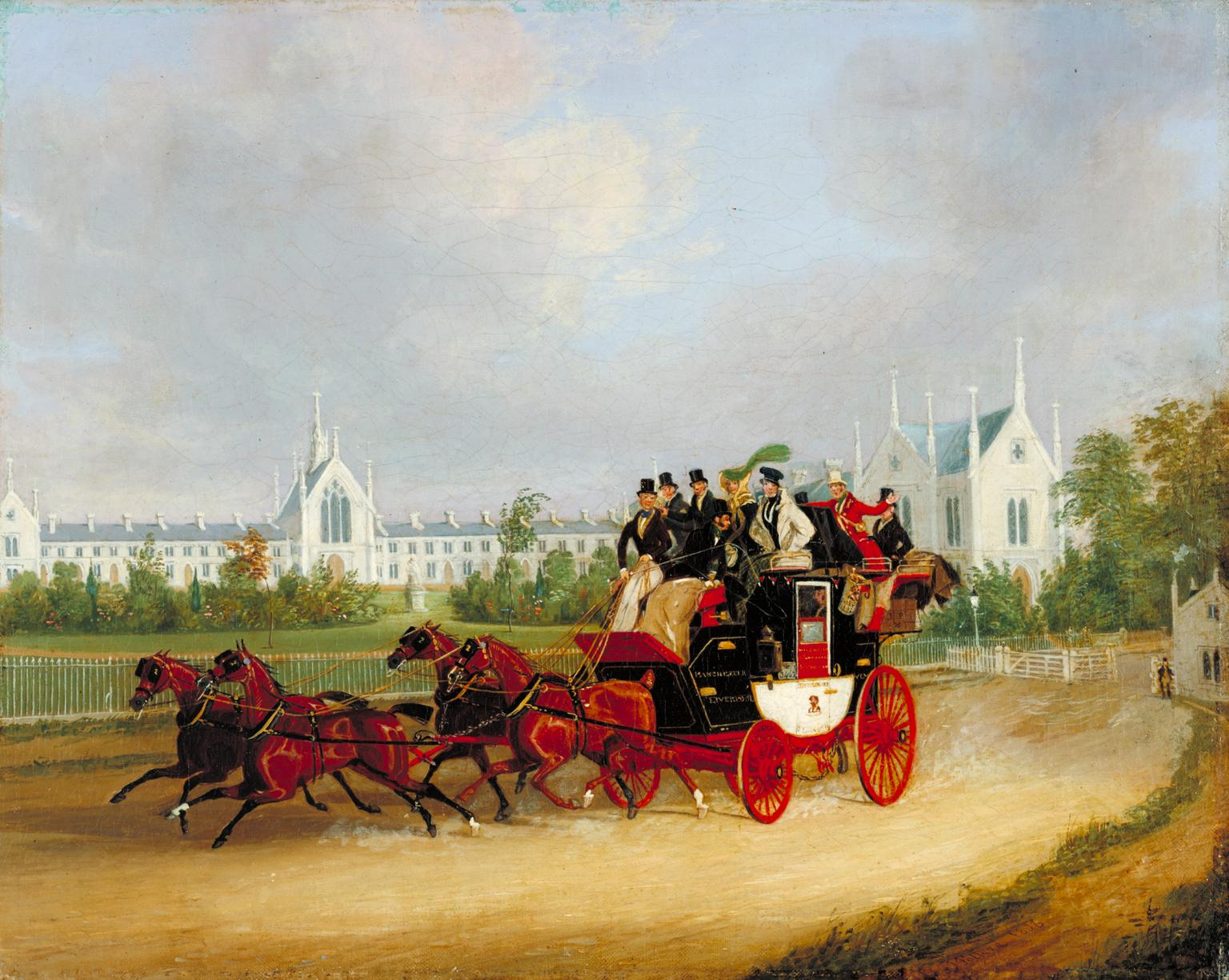
1836 painting of Tally-Ho by James Pollard

Tally-Ho was a name applied to a series of fast stagecoach services operating in early 19th-century Britain. The name was later adopted by the American DeLancey Kane for his coach which became a symbol of the Gilded Age revival of road coaching. "Tally-Ho" eventually became a general term for large or rapid coaches.
