= The Tally Ho, Finchley =

Public house in north Finchley, London

Coordinates: 51.6141°N 0.1765°W

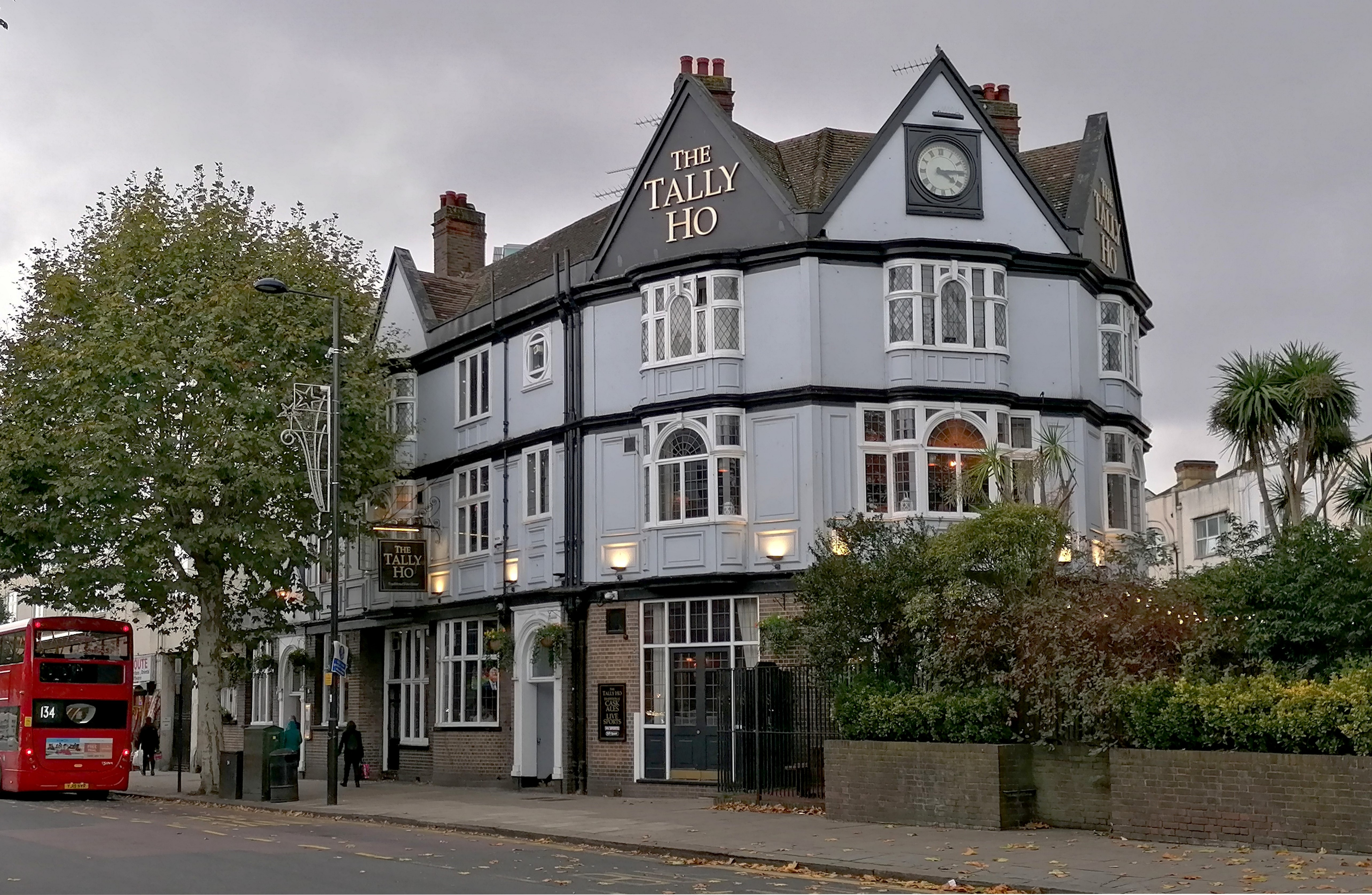
The Tally Ho, east side, October 2019

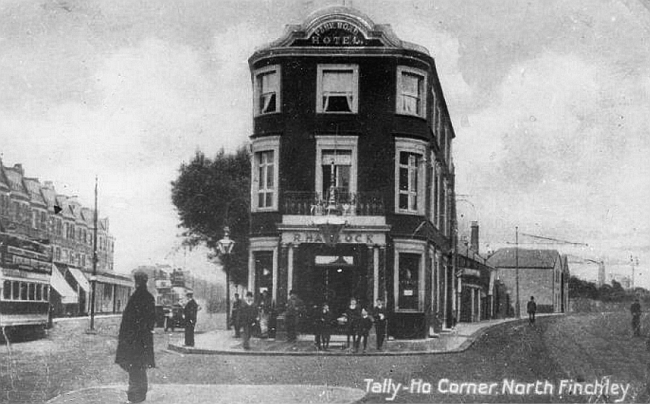
Park Road Hotel c. 1920

The Tally Ho is a public house in north Finchley, north London, under the management of the Stonegate Pub Company.

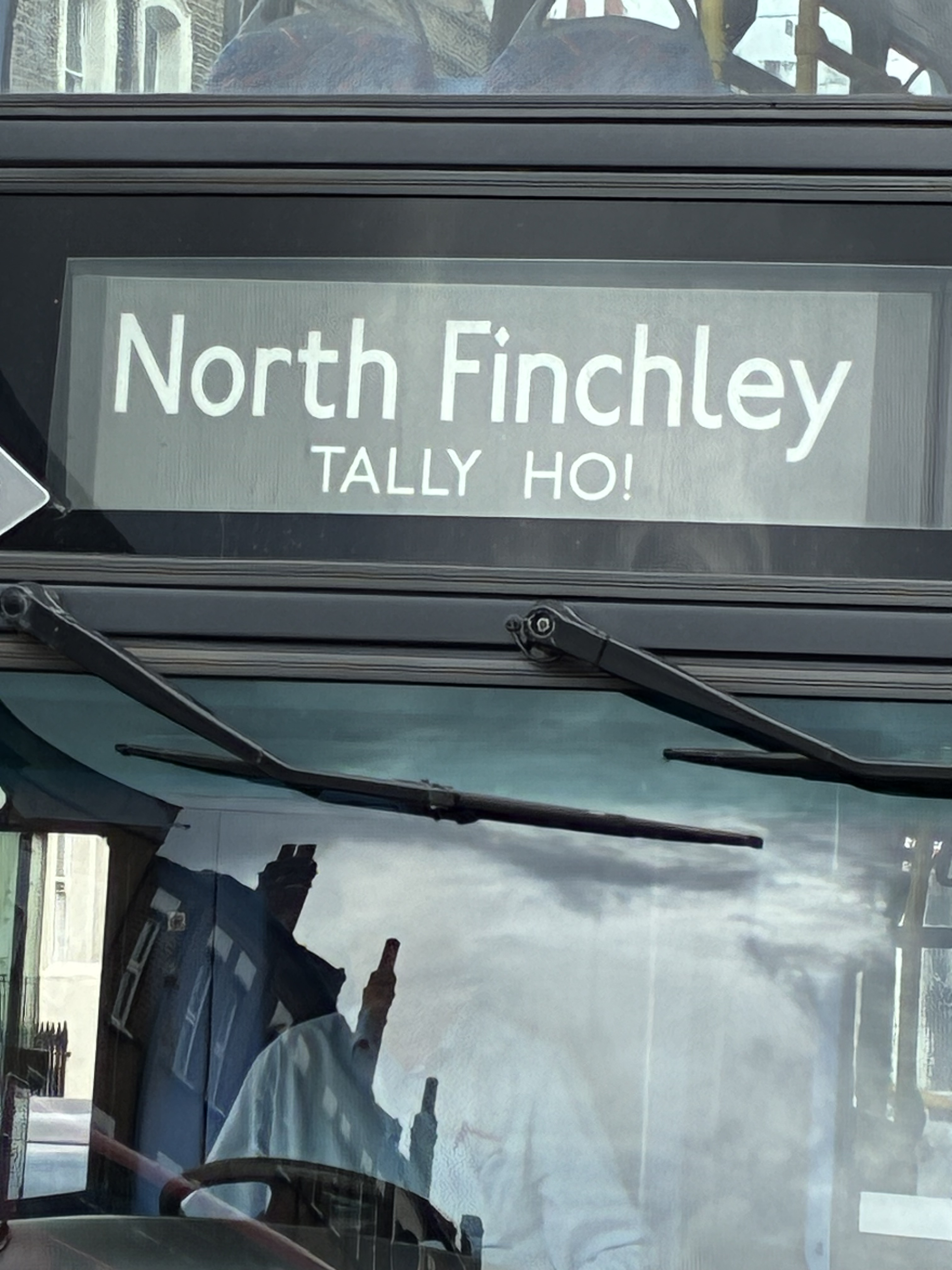
London bus showing the Tally Ho! bus stop

== History ==
The pub was built in 1927 on a wedge-shaped plot where Ballards Lane in the west meets the High Road (Great North Road) in the east. It replaced the Park Road Hotel on the same site and was originally under the management of Charrington Brewery. The design is gabled all round with Shavian Ipswich windows. It was named after nearby Tally Ho Corner where in the 1820s and 30s the Tally Ho Coach Company kept horses that were used for the first change of horses for the Birmingham mail coach.

In May 2016, it was announced that the pub, which was under the management of J.D. Wetherspoons, was for sale. The lease was taken over by the Stonegate Pub Company. The pub serves as a stop for London buses (see photo).
