= Holland & Holland coachbuilders =

London firm of coachbuilders

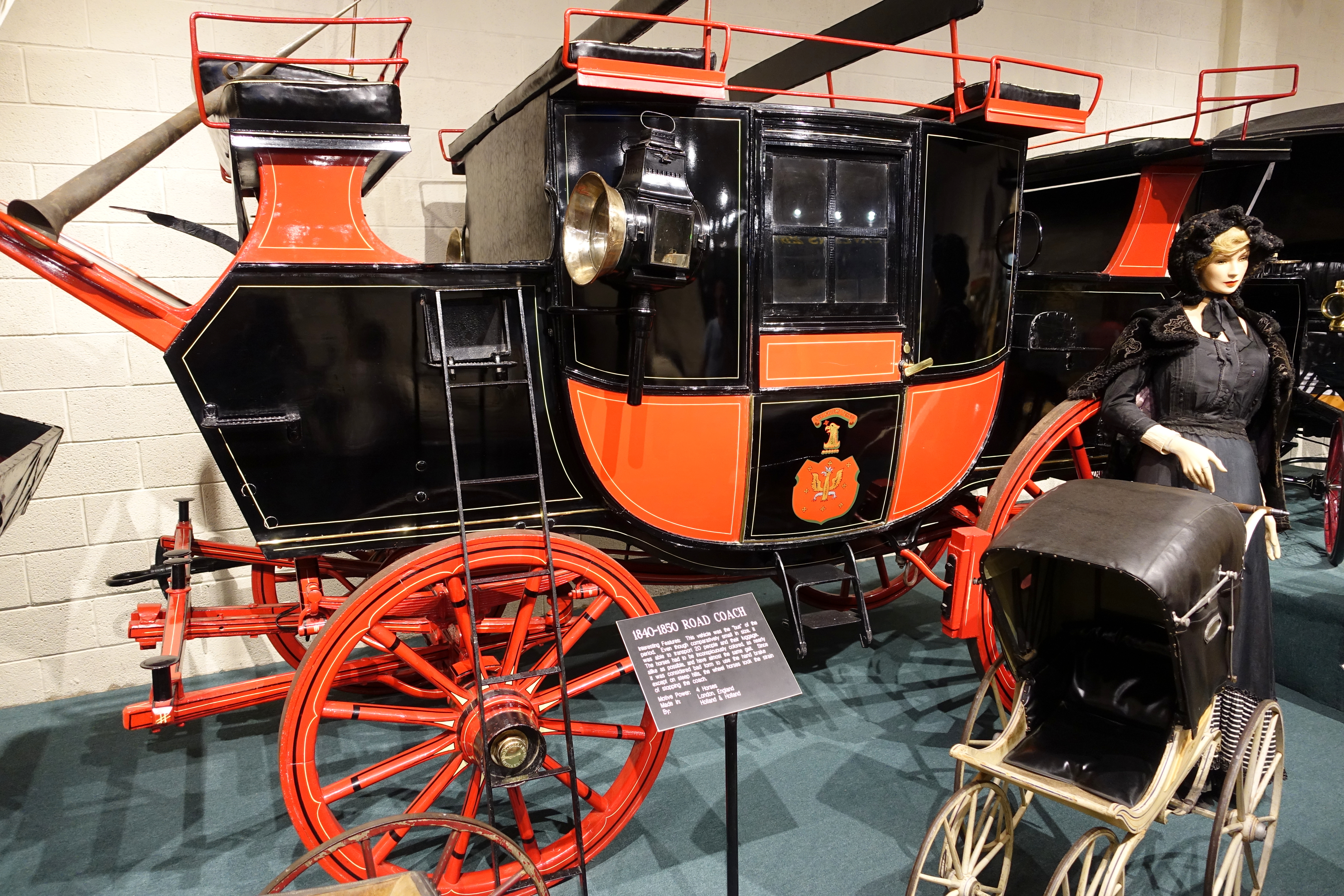
Road Coach by Holland & Holland, 1850s

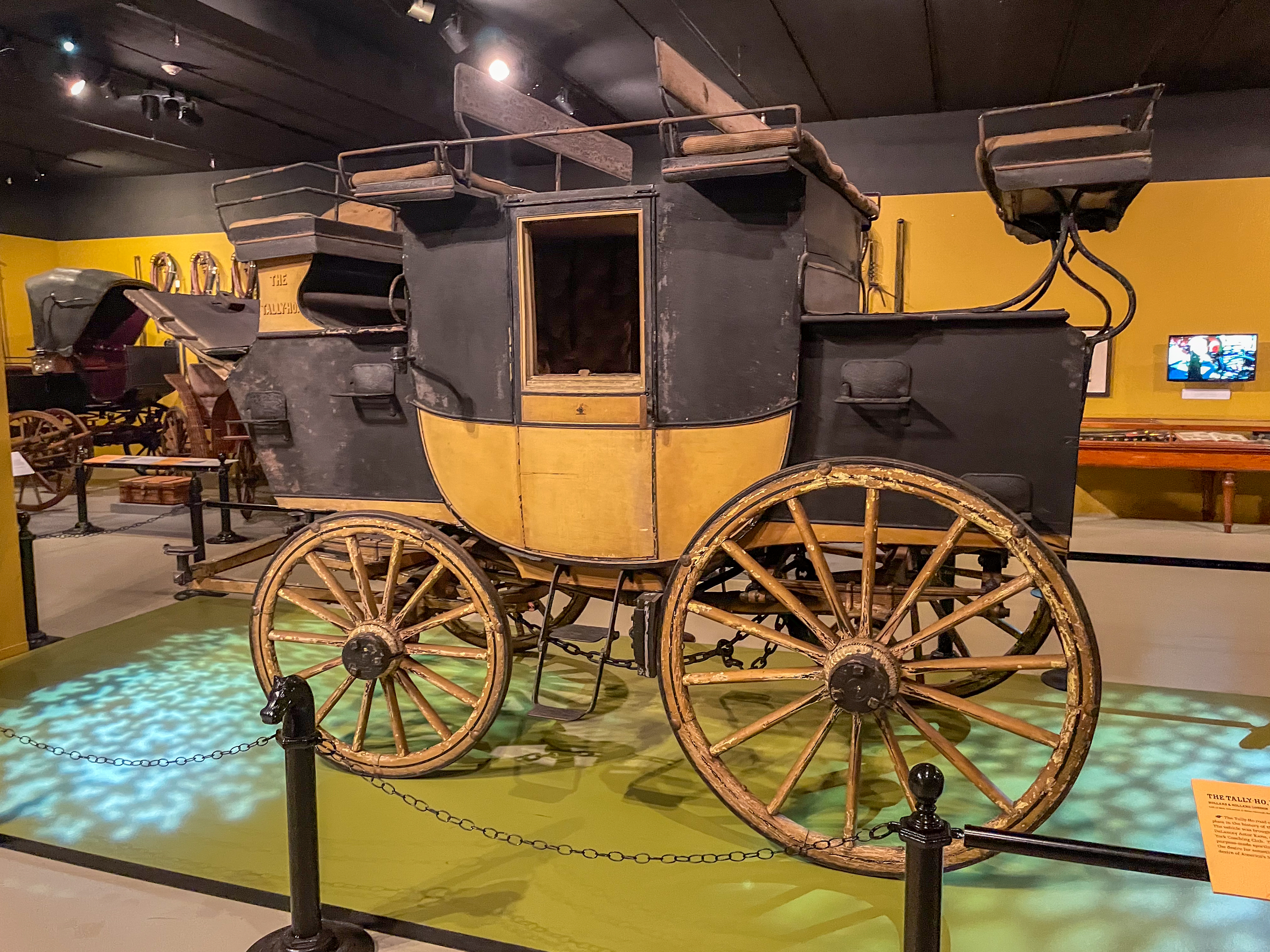
The Tally-Ho, a private road coach built in 1875 by Holland & Holland (unrestored)

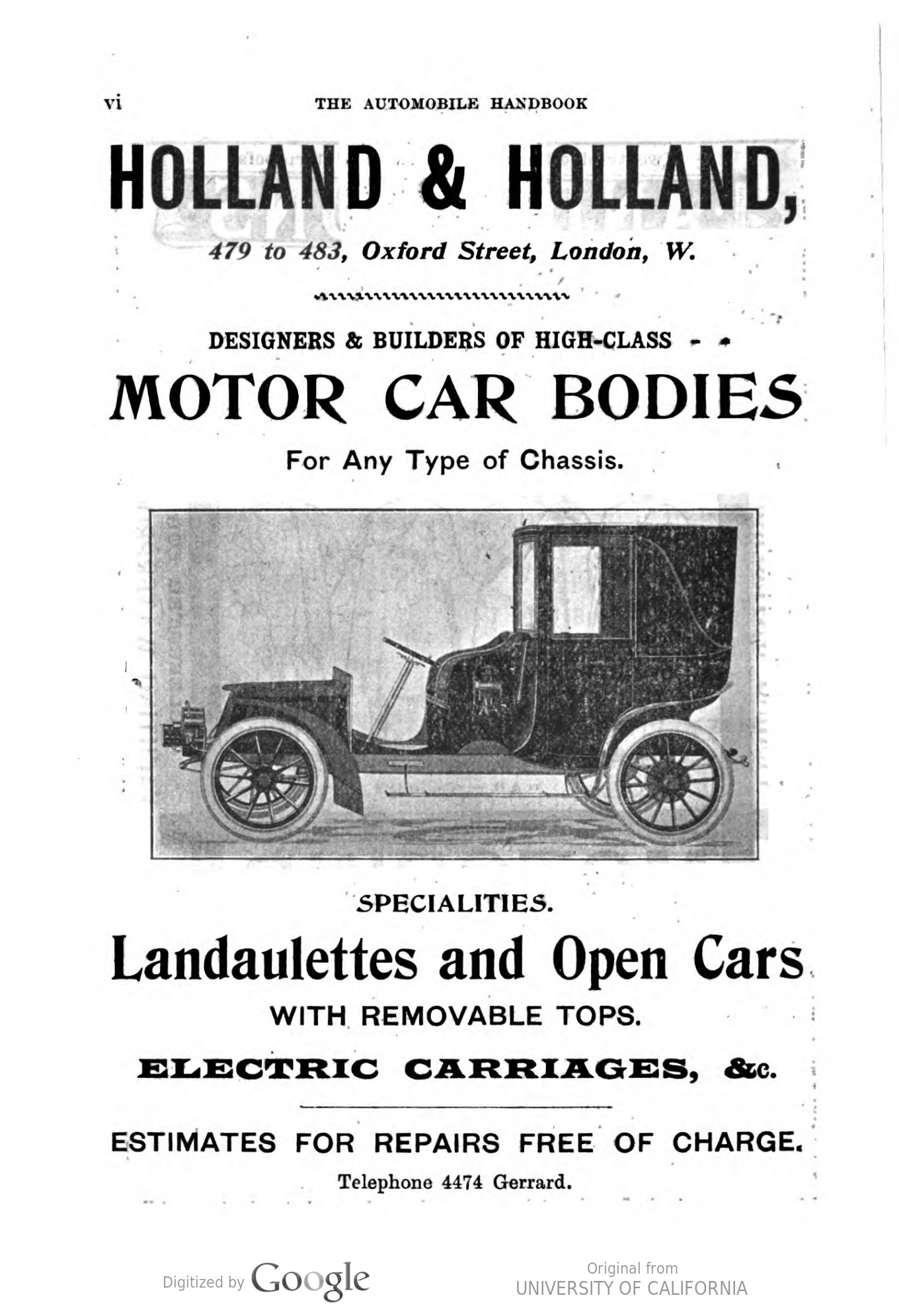
A 1904 advertisement

Holland & Holland were a London firm of coachbuilders active over the century before the First World War. Their showroom was at 254 Oxford Street West and their works at 10, 25 to 27 and 45 North Row between Grosvenor Square and Oxford Street.

After railways replaced horse-drawn coaches for carrying passengers and mail, it became fashionable for young men to buy the out-of-use coaches to drive for sport, and enthusiasts then began having new coaches built for the purpose. Holland & Holland developed a reputation for the manufacture of park drags and private road coaches for rich sporting clientele—those gentlemen who wished to drive their own four-in-hand teams for pleasure, usually participating in exclusive driving clubs. According to the Carriage Association of America, "Holland & Holland was one of the world's most highly respected manufacturers of coaches and drags", and according to Ken Wheeling, "Holland & Holland coaches were highly desirable then and very much prized today".

In 1873 John Holland, one of the firm's owners, was a master of the Worshipful Company of Coachmakers and Coach Harness Makers. In 1888 the company was bought by Kesterton, a firm of Long Acre, which kept the Holland & Holland name, and in 1912 it was bought by Thrupp & Maberly.

In the early 20th century they were listed as electric carriage builders.

Many Holland & Holland coaches can be seen in carriage museums around the world. Surviving Holland & Holland coaches are still used in Europe. At the 2019 coaching outing held around the Iffezheim racecourse near Baden-Baden, Germany, two Holland & Holland vehicles took part: a private drag, still in its original vermilion paint, and a private road coach owned by collector Heinz Scheidel that had previously belonged to Edwin Howlett.
